= List of metropolitan areas of Kentucky =

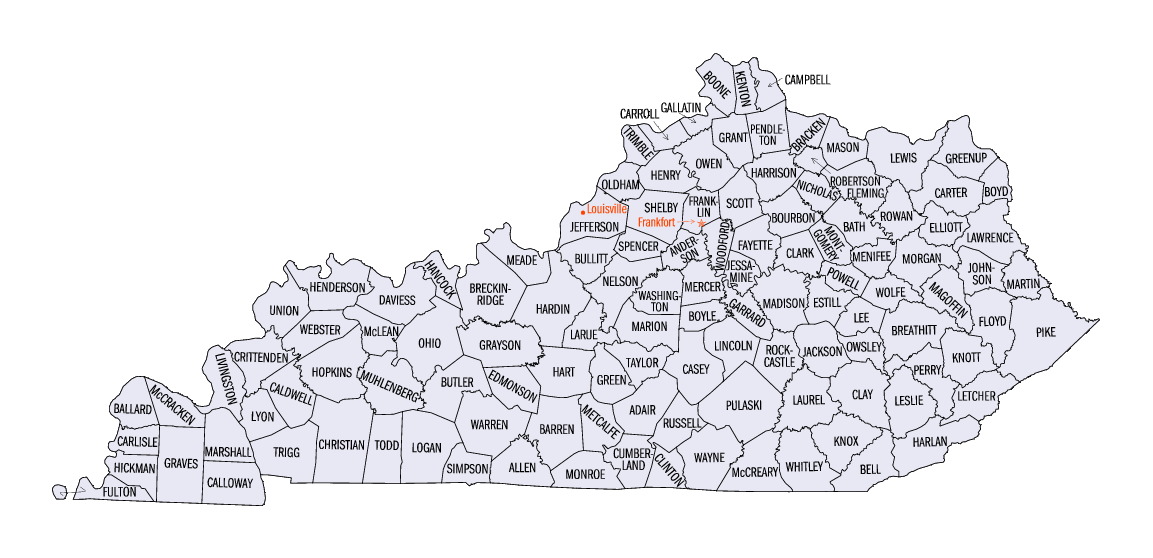
An enlargeable map of the 120 counties of the Commonwealth of Kentucky.

The metropolitan areas of the Commonwealth of Kentucky include the urban statistical areas that are defined by the United States Office of Management and Budget and regions of urban population in which are defined by other organizations.

== Metropolitan statistical areas ==
The following tables list population figures for the metropolitan statistical areas of Kentucky, in rank of population.

Metropolitan area	2021 Population		
Metropolitan area	2021 Population	Bowling Green, KY MSA	182,594
Cincinnati-Middletown, OH-KY-IN MSA	471,903^{a}		
Clarksville-Hopkinsville, TN-KY MSA	86,418^{a}		
Elizabethtown-Fort Knox, KY MSA	156,766		
Evansville, IN-KY MSA	59,871^{a}		
Huntington-Ashland, WV-KY-OH MSA	109,960^{a}		
Lexington-Fayette, KY MSA	517,846		
Louisville-Jefferson County, KY-IN MSA	1,126,442^{a}		
Owensboro, KY MSA	121,227		

- ^{a}Only Kentucky portion of MSA population shown

The following table describes these areas with the following information:

1. The name of the county
2. The population of the county as of July 1, 2009, as estimated by the United States Census Bureau
3. The county population as of April 1, 2000, as counted by the United States Census 2000, and
4. The percent county population change from April 1, 2000, to July 1, 2009, as estimated by the United States Census Bureau.

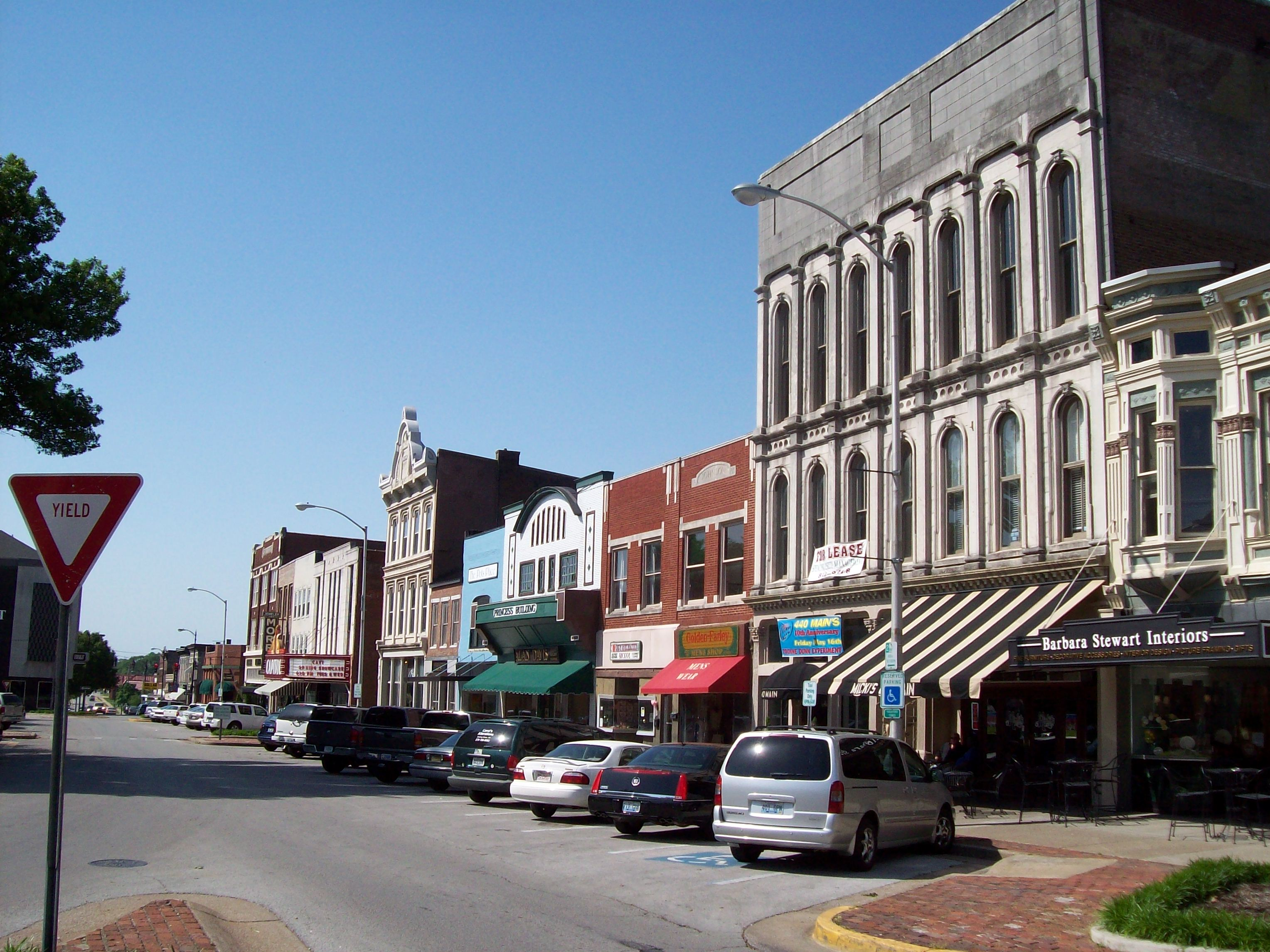
Bowling Green, third largest city and metropolitan area

=== Bowling Green, KY MSA ===
Bowling Green, KY MSA
County	2009 Pop	2000 Pop	Change
Edmonson County, Kentucky	11,926	11,644	+2.42%
Warren County, Kentucky	108,669	92,552	+17.41%
Total	120,595	104,166	+15.77%

=== Cincinnati-Middletown, OH-KY-IN MSA ===
Covington

Cincinnati-Middletown, OH-KY-IN MSA
County	2009 Pop	2000 Pop	Change
Hamilton County, Ohio	855,062	845,303	+1.15%
Butler County, Ohio	363,184	332,807	+9.13%
Warren County, Ohio	210,712	158,383	+33.04%
Clermont County, Ohio	196,364	177,977	+10.33%
Kenton County, Kentucky	158,729	151,464	+4.80%
Boone County, Kentucky	118,576	85,991	+37.89%
Campbell County, Kentucky	88,423	88,616	−0.22%
Dearborn County, Indiana	50,502	46,109	+9.53%
Brown County, Ohio	44,003	42,285	+4.06%
Grant County, Kentucky	25,542	22,384	+14.11%
Franklin County, Indiana	23,148	22,151	+4.50%
Pendleton County, Kentucky	14,887	14,390	+3.45%
Bracken County, Kentucky	8,653	8,279	+4.52%
Gallatin County, Kentucky	8,202	7,870	+4.22%
Ohio County, Indiana	5,909	5,623	+5.09%
Kentucky Total	423,012	378,994	+11.61%
Total	2,171,896	2,009,632	+8.07%

=== Clarksville-Hopkinsville, TN-KY MSA ===
Clarksville-Hopkinsville, TN-KY MSA
County	2009 Pop	2000 Pop	Change
Montgomery County, Tennessee	160,978	134,768	+19.45%
Christian County, Kentucky	80,938	72,265	+12.00%
Trigg County, Kentucky	13,290	12,597	+5.50%
Stewart County, Tennessee	13,340	12,370	+7.84%
Kentucky Total	94,228	84,862	+11.04%
Total	268,546	232,000	+15.75%

=== Elizabethtown, KY MSA ===
Elizabethtown, KY MSA
County	2009 Pop	2000 Pop	Change
Hardin County, Kentucky	99,770	94,174	+5.94%
LaRue County, Kentucky	13,663	13,373	+2.17%
Total	113,443	107,547	+5.48%

=== Evansville, IN-KY MSA ===
Evansville, IN-KY MSA
County	2009 Pop	2000 Pop	Change
Vanderburgh County, Indiana	175,434	171,922	+2.04%
Warrick County, Indiana	58,521	52,383	+11.72%
Henderson County, Kentucky	45,496	44,829	+1.49%
Gibson County, Indiana	32,750	32,500	+0.77%
Posey County, Indiana	26,004	27,061	−3.91%
Webster County, Kentucky	13,706	14,120	−2.93%
Kentucky Total	59,202	58,949	+0.43%
Total	351,911	342,815	+2.65%

=== Huntington-Ashland, WV-KY-OH MSA ===
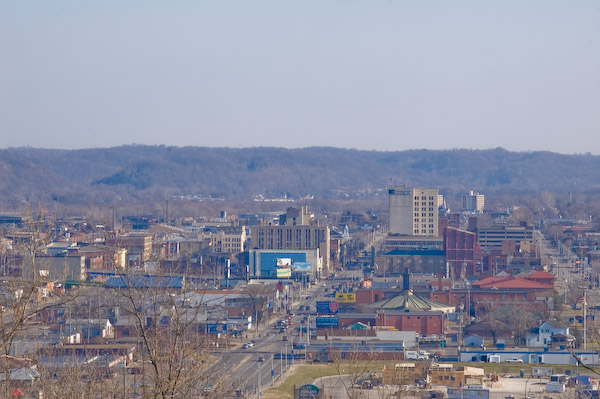
Ashland

Huntington-Ashland, WV-KY-OH MSA
County	2009 Pop	2000 Pop	Change
Cabell County, West Virginia	95,214	96,784	−1.62%
Lawrence County, Ohio	62,774	62,319	+0.73%
Boyd County, Kentucky	48,527	49,752	−2.46%
Wayne County, West Virginia	41,119	42,903	−4.16%
Greenup County, Kentucky	38,020	36,891	+3.06%
Kentucky Total	86,549	86,643	−0.11%
Total	285,624	288,649	−1.05%

=== Lexington-Fayette, KY MSA ===
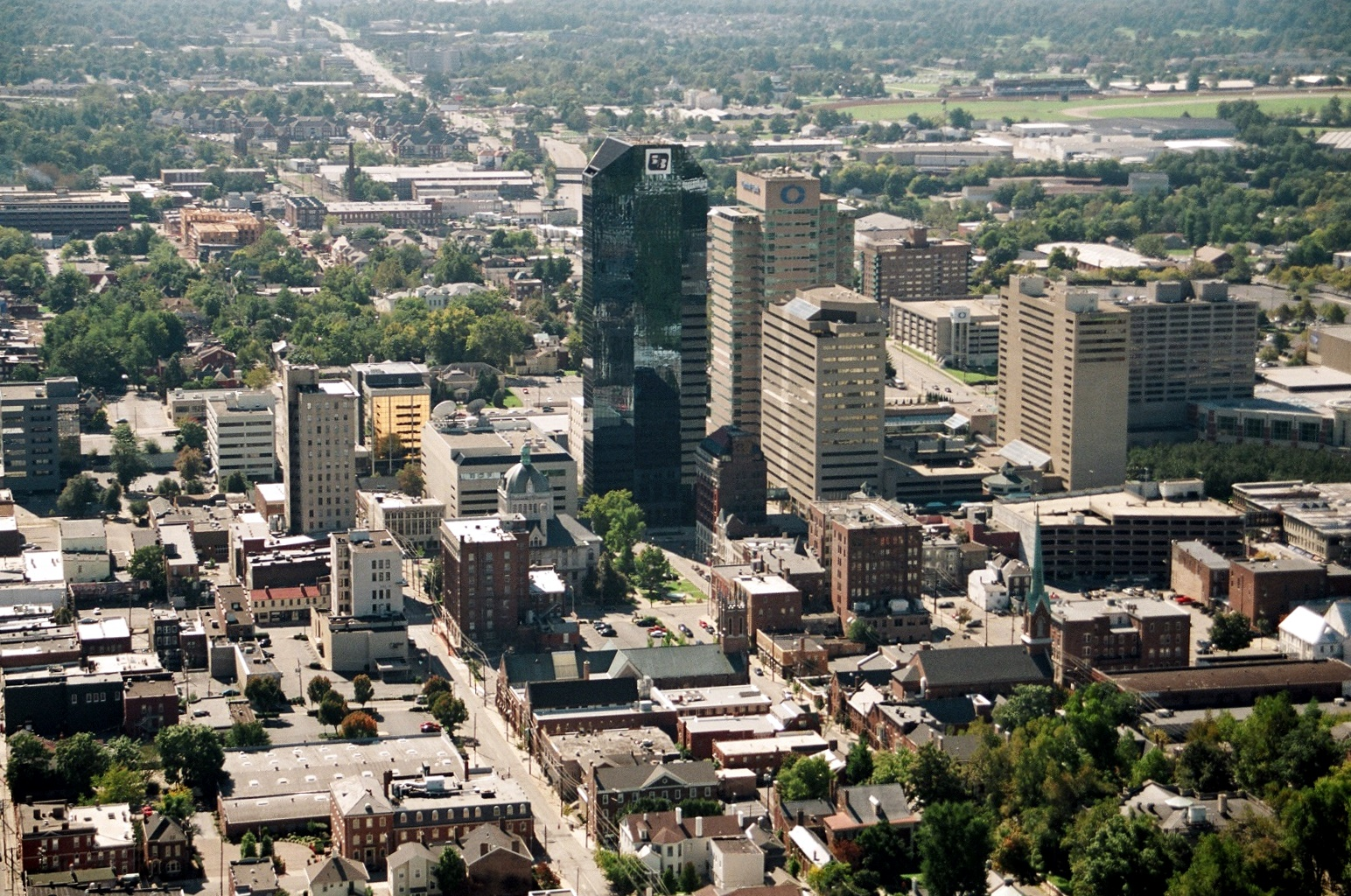
Lexington, second largest city and metropolitan area

Lexington-Fayette, KY MSA
County	2009 Pop	2000 Pop	Change
Fayette County, Kentucky	296,545	260,512	+13.83%
Jessamine County, Kentucky	47,589	39,041	+21.89%
Scott County, Kentucky	45,841	33,061	+38.66%
Clark County, Kentucky	36,159	33,061	+9.37%
Woodford County, Kentucky	24,986	23,208	+7.66%
Bourbon County, Kentucky	19,729	19,360	+1.91%
Total	470,849	408,326	+15.31%

=== Louisville-Jefferson County, KY-IN MSA ===
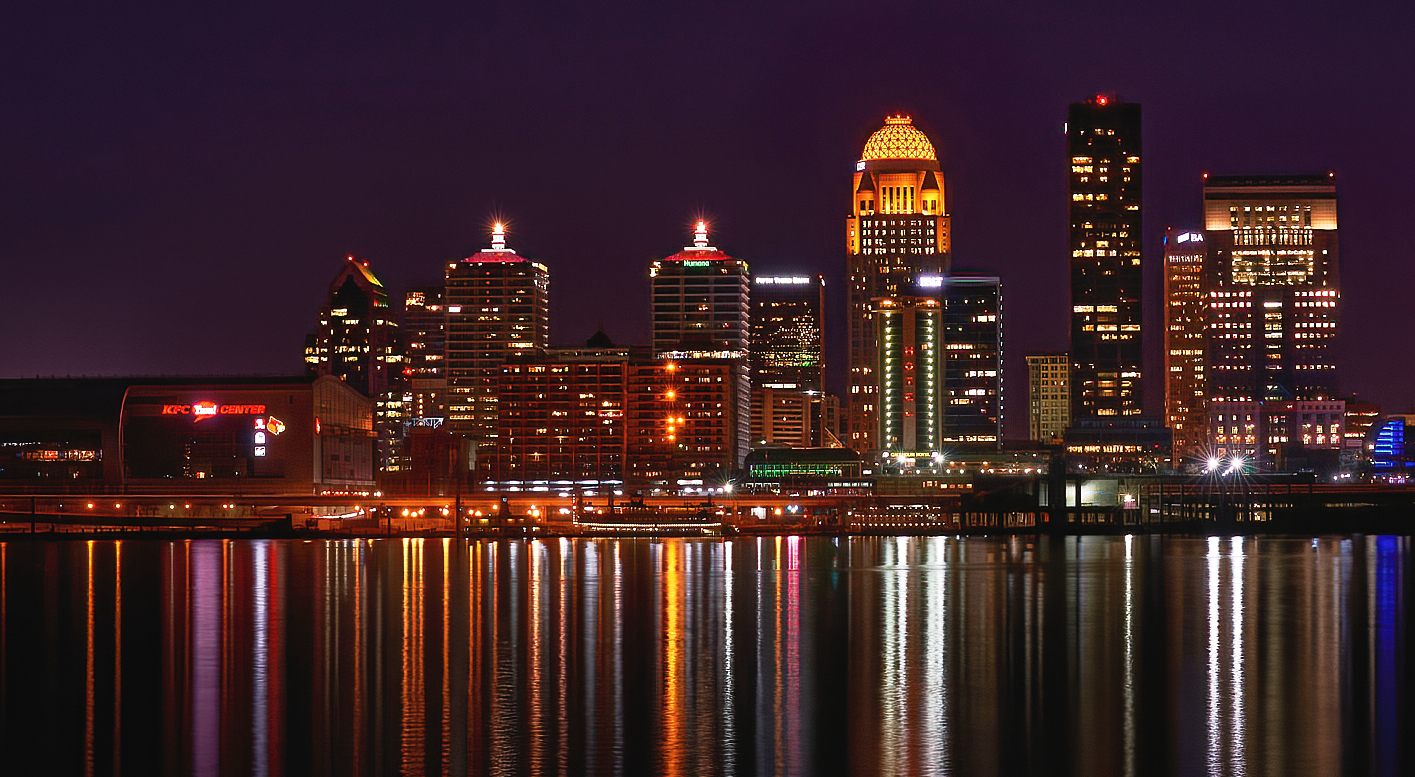
Louisville, largest city and metropolitan area

Louisville-Jefferson County, KY-IN MSA
County	2009 Pop	2000 Pop	Change
Jefferson County, Kentucky	721,594	693,604	+4.04%
Clark County, Indiana	108,634	96,472	+12.61%
Bullitt County, Kentucky	75,653	61,236	+23.54%
Floyd County, Indiana	74,426	70,823	+5.09%
Oldham County, Kentucky	58,095	46,178	+25.81%
Nelson County, Kentucky	43,550	37,477	+16.20%
Shelby County, Kentucky	42,078	33,337	+26.22%
Harrison County, Indiana	37,562	34,325	+9.43%
Washington County, Indiana	27,729	27,223	+1.86%
Meade County, Kentucky	26,501	26,349	+0.58%
Spencer County, Kentucky	17,737	11,766	+50.75%
Henry County, Kentucky	16,060	15,060	+6.64%
Trimble County, Kentucky	8,958	8,125	+10.25%
Kentucky Total	1,010,226	933,132	+8.26%
Total	1,258,577	1,161,975	+8.31%

=== Owensboro, KY MSA ===
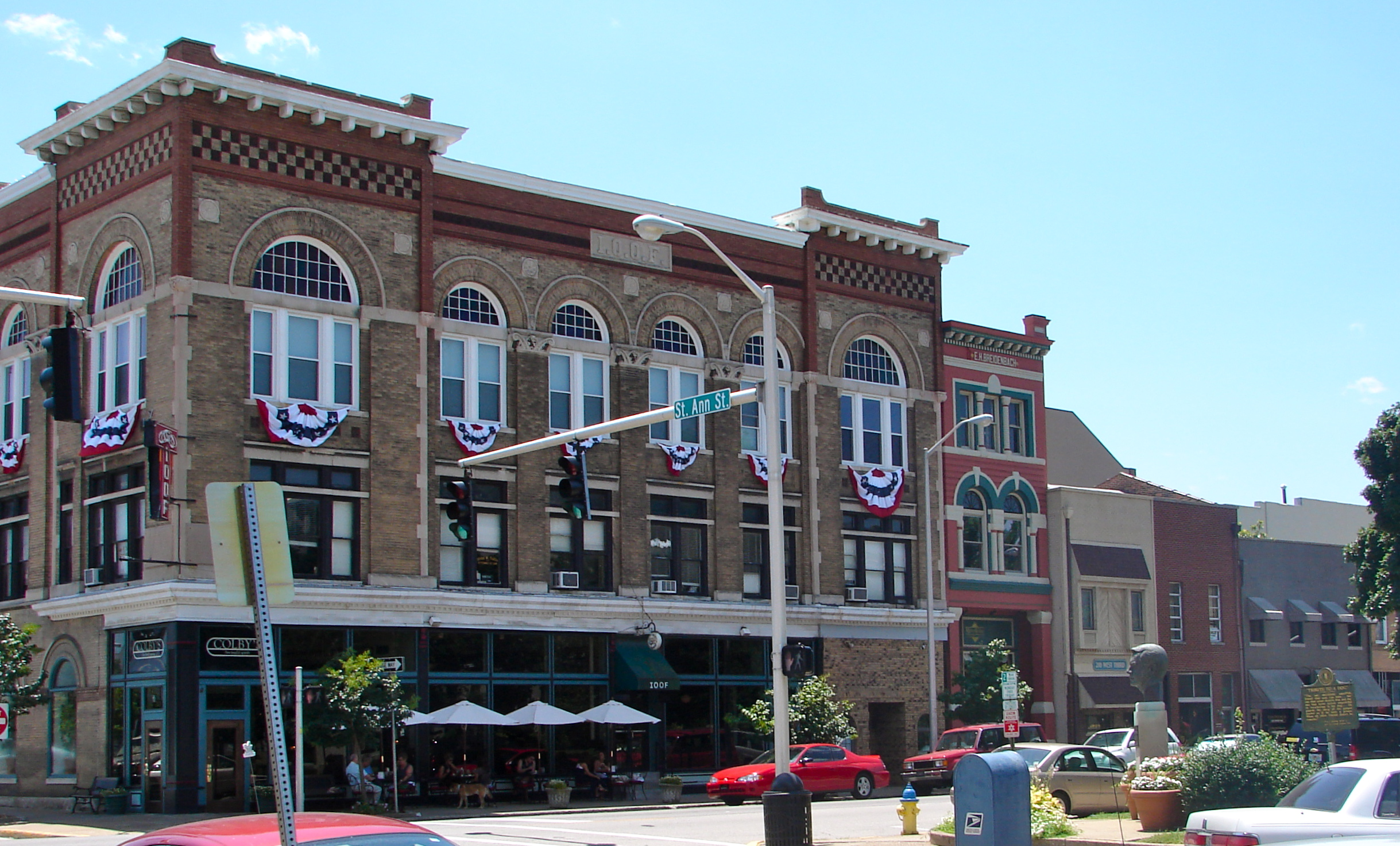
Owensboro

Owensboro, KY MSA
County	2009 Pop	2000 Pop	Change
Daviess County, Kentucky	95,394	91,545	+4.20%
McLean County, Kentucky	9,607	9,938	−3.33%
Hancock County, Kentucky	8,635	8,392	+2.90%
Total	113,636	109,875	+3.42%

== See also ==
- State of Kentucky
  - Demographics of Kentucky
  - Geography of Kentucky
- United States
  - United States Census Bureau
    - Table of United States Combined Statistical Areas (CSA)
    - Table of United States Core Based Statistical Areas (CBSA)
    - Table of United States Metropolitan Statistical Areas (MSA)
    - Table of United States Micropolitan Statistical Areas (μSA)
    - Table of United States primary census statistical areas (PCSA)
