= Kentucky statistical areas =

Coordinates: 37.5347°N 85.3021°W

The United States Commonwealth of Kentucky currently has 32 statistical areas that have been delineated by the Office of Management and Budget (OMB). On July 21, 2023, the OMB delineated 8 combined statistical areas, 9 metropolitan statistical areas, and 15 micropolitan statistical areas in Kentucky. As of 2025, the largest of these is the Louisville/Jefferson County–Elizabethtown, KY-IN CSA, comprising greater Louisville, Kentucky's largest city.

== Statistical areas ==
The Office of Management and Budget (OMB) has designated more than 1,000 statistical areas for the United States and Puerto Rico. These statistical areas are important geographic delineations of population clusters used by the OMB, the United States Census Bureau, planning organizations, and federal, state, and local government entities.

The OMB defines a core-based statistical area (commonly referred to as a CBSA) as the county or counties (or county-equivalents) surrounding at least one densely-settled core of at least 10,000 population, "plus adjacent counties having a high degree of social and economic integration with the core as measured through commuting ties with the counties containing the core". The OMB further divides core-based statistical areas based on population into metropolitan statistical areas (MSAs) for those with at least 50,000 and micropolitan statistical areas (μSAs) for those with 10,000 to 49,999 people.

The OMB defines a combined statistical area (CSA) as two or more adjacent core-based statistical areas where the employment interchange rate (% commuting from A to B plus % commuting from B to A) is at least 15%. The primary statistical areas (PSAs) include all combined statistical areas and any core-based statistical area that is not a constituent of a combined statistical area.

The 32 United States statistical areas and 120 counties of the Commonwealth of Kentucky (Note: An out-of-state area and its population are displayed in green. An area that extends into more than one state is displayed in purple. A purple population number over a black population number show the total population versus the in-state population. The state's abbreviation is also shown next to the in-state total.)
Combined statistical area	2025 population (est.)	Core-based statistical area	2025 population (est.)	County	2025 population (est.)
Louisville/Jefferson County–Elizabethtown, KY-IN CSA	1,531,175; 1,219,052 (KY)	Louisville/Jefferson County, KY-IN MSA	1,402,509; 1,090,386 (KY)	Jefferson County, Kentucky	795,222
Louisville/Jefferson County–Elizabethtown, KY-IN CSA	1,531,175; 1,219,052 (KY)	Louisville/Jefferson County, KY-IN MSA	1,402,509; 1,090,386 (KY)	Clark County, Indiana	130,451
Louisville/Jefferson County–Elizabethtown, KY-IN CSA	1,531,175; 1,219,052 (KY)	Louisville/Jefferson County, KY-IN MSA	1,402,509; 1,090,386 (KY)	Bullitt County, Kentucky	86,454
Louisville/Jefferson County–Elizabethtown, KY-IN CSA	1,531,175; 1,219,052 (KY)	Louisville/Jefferson County, KY-IN MSA	1,402,509; 1,090,386 (KY)	Floyd County, Indiana	82,153
Louisville/Jefferson County–Elizabethtown, KY-IN CSA	1,531,175; 1,219,052 (KY)	Louisville/Jefferson County, KY-IN MSA	1,402,509; 1,090,386 (KY)	Oldham County, Kentucky	70,986
Louisville/Jefferson County–Elizabethtown, KY-IN CSA	1,531,175; 1,219,052 (KY)	Louisville/Jefferson County, KY-IN MSA	1,402,509; 1,090,386 (KY)	Shelby County, Kentucky	51,243
Louisville/Jefferson County–Elizabethtown, KY-IN CSA	1,531,175; 1,219,052 (KY)	Louisville/Jefferson County, KY-IN MSA	1,402,509; 1,090,386 (KY)	Nelson County, Kentucky	49,036
Louisville/Jefferson County–Elizabethtown, KY-IN CSA	1,531,175; 1,219,052 (KY)	Louisville/Jefferson County, KY-IN MSA	1,402,509; 1,090,386 (KY)	Harrison County, Indiana	40,437
Louisville/Jefferson County–Elizabethtown, KY-IN CSA	1,531,175; 1,219,052 (KY)	Louisville/Jefferson County, KY-IN MSA	1,402,509; 1,090,386 (KY)	Meade County, Kentucky	30,699
Louisville/Jefferson County–Elizabethtown, KY-IN CSA	1,531,175; 1,219,052 (KY)	Louisville/Jefferson County, KY-IN MSA	1,402,509; 1,090,386 (KY)	Washington County, Indiana	28,383
Louisville/Jefferson County–Elizabethtown, KY-IN CSA	1,531,175; 1,219,052 (KY)	Louisville/Jefferson County, KY-IN MSA	1,402,509; 1,090,386 (KY)	Spencer County, Kentucky	20,998
Louisville/Jefferson County–Elizabethtown, KY-IN CSA	1,531,175; 1,219,052 (KY)	Louisville/Jefferson County, KY-IN MSA	1,402,509; 1,090,386 (KY)	Henry County, Kentucky	16,447
Louisville/Jefferson County–Elizabethtown, KY-IN CSA	1,531,175; 1,219,052 (KY)	Elizabethtown, KY MSA	128,666	Hardin County, Kentucky	113,482
Louisville/Jefferson County–Elizabethtown, KY-IN CSA	1,531,175; 1,219,052 (KY)	Elizabethtown, KY MSA	128,666	LaRue County, Kentucky	15,184
Lexington-Fayette–Richmond–Frankfort, KY CSA	793,282	Lexington-Fayette, KY MSA	535,174	Fayette County, Kentucky	329,751
Lexington-Fayette–Richmond–Frankfort, KY CSA	793,282	Lexington-Fayette, KY MSA	535,174	Scott County, Kentucky	62,262
Lexington-Fayette–Richmond–Frankfort, KY CSA	793,282	Lexington-Fayette, KY MSA	535,174	Jessamine County, Kentucky	57,147
Lexington-Fayette–Richmond–Frankfort, KY CSA	793,282	Lexington-Fayette, KY MSA	535,174	Clark County, Kentucky	37,888
Lexington-Fayette–Richmond–Frankfort, KY CSA	793,282	Lexington-Fayette, KY MSA	535,174	Woodford County, Kentucky	27,883
Lexington-Fayette–Richmond–Frankfort, KY CSA	793,282	Lexington-Fayette, KY MSA	535,174	Bourbon County, Kentucky	20,243
Lexington-Fayette–Richmond–Frankfort, KY CSA	793,282	Richmond–Berea, KY μSA	131,806	Madison County, Kentucky	101,696
Lexington-Fayette–Richmond–Frankfort, KY CSA	793,282	Richmond–Berea, KY μSA	131,806	Rockcastle County, Kentucky	16,148
Lexington-Fayette–Richmond–Frankfort, KY CSA	793,282	Richmond–Berea, KY μSA	131,806	Estill County, Kentucky	13,962
Lexington-Fayette–Richmond–Frankfort, KY CSA	793,282	Frankfort, KY μSA	77,874	Franklin County, Kentucky	52,649
Lexington-Fayette–Richmond–Frankfort, KY CSA	793,282	Frankfort, KY μSA	77,874	Anderson County, Kentucky	25,225
Lexington-Fayette–Richmond–Frankfort, KY CSA	793,282	Mount Sterling, KY μSA	48,428	Montgomery County, Kentucky	28,822
Lexington-Fayette–Richmond–Frankfort, KY CSA	793,282	Mount Sterling, KY μSA	48,428	Bath County, Kentucky	13,176
Lexington-Fayette–Richmond–Frankfort, KY CSA	793,282	Mount Sterling, KY μSA	48,428	Menifee County, Kentucky	6,430
Cincinnati–Wilmington, OH-KY-IN CSA	2,355,159; 474,868 (KY)	Cincinnati, OH-KY-IN MSA	2,312,858; 474,868 (KY)	Hamilton County, Ohio	838,418
Cincinnati–Wilmington, OH-KY-IN CSA	2,355,159; 474,868 (KY)	Cincinnati, OH-KY-IN MSA	2,312,858; 474,868 (KY)	Butler County, Ohio	400,128
Cincinnati–Wilmington, OH-KY-IN CSA	2,355,159; 474,868 (KY)	Cincinnati, OH-KY-IN MSA	2,312,858; 474,868 (KY)	Warren County, Ohio	257,181
Cincinnati–Wilmington, OH-KY-IN CSA	2,355,159; 474,868 (KY)	Cincinnati, OH-KY-IN MSA	2,312,858; 474,868 (KY)	Clermont County, Ohio	216,977
Cincinnati–Wilmington, OH-KY-IN CSA	2,355,159; 474,868 (KY)	Cincinnati, OH-KY-IN MSA	2,312,858; 474,868 (KY)	Kenton County, Kentucky	175,779
Cincinnati–Wilmington, OH-KY-IN CSA	2,355,159; 474,868 (KY)	Cincinnati, OH-KY-IN MSA	2,312,858; 474,868 (KY)	Boone County, Kentucky	145,316
Cincinnati–Wilmington, OH-KY-IN CSA	2,355,159; 474,868 (KY)	Cincinnati, OH-KY-IN MSA	2,312,858; 474,868 (KY)	Campbell County, Kentucky	95,441
Cincinnati–Wilmington, OH-KY-IN CSA	2,355,159; 474,868 (KY)	Cincinnati, OH-KY-IN MSA	2,312,858; 474,868 (KY)	Dearborn County, Indiana	51,609
Cincinnati–Wilmington, OH-KY-IN CSA	2,355,159; 474,868 (KY)	Cincinnati, OH-KY-IN MSA	2,312,858; 474,868 (KY)	Brown County, Ohio	44,397
Cincinnati–Wilmington, OH-KY-IN CSA	2,355,159; 474,868 (KY)	Cincinnati, OH-KY-IN MSA	2,312,858; 474,868 (KY)	Grant County, Kentucky	26,181
Cincinnati–Wilmington, OH-KY-IN CSA	2,355,159; 474,868 (KY)	Cincinnati, OH-KY-IN MSA	2,312,858; 474,868 (KY)	Franklin County, Indiana	23,286
Cincinnati–Wilmington, OH-KY-IN CSA	2,355,159; 474,868 (KY)	Cincinnati, OH-KY-IN MSA	2,312,858; 474,868 (KY)	Pendleton County, Kentucky	14,800
Cincinnati–Wilmington, OH-KY-IN CSA	2,355,159; 474,868 (KY)	Cincinnati, OH-KY-IN MSA	2,312,858; 474,868 (KY)	Gallatin County, Kentucky	8,840
Cincinnati–Wilmington, OH-KY-IN CSA	2,355,159; 474,868 (KY)	Cincinnati, OH-KY-IN MSA	2,312,858; 474,868 (KY)	Bracken County, Kentucky	8,511
Cincinnati–Wilmington, OH-KY-IN CSA	2,355,159; 474,868 (KY)	Cincinnati, OH-KY-IN MSA	2,312,858; 474,868 (KY)	Ohio County, Indiana	5,994
Cincinnati–Wilmington, OH-KY-IN CSA	2,355,159; 474,868 (KY)	Wilmington, OH μSA	42,301	Clinton County, Ohio	42,301
Bowling Green–Glasgow, KY CSA	274,192	Bowling Green, KY MSA	197,180	Warren County, Kentucky	149,375
Bowling Green–Glasgow, KY CSA	274,192	Bowling Green, KY MSA	197,180	Allen County, Kentucky	22,536
Bowling Green–Glasgow, KY CSA	274,192	Bowling Green, KY MSA	197,180	Edmonson County, Kentucky	12,749
Bowling Green–Glasgow, KY CSA	274,192	Bowling Green, KY MSA	197,180	Butler County, Kentucky	12,520
Bowling Green–Glasgow, KY CSA	274,192	Glasgow, KY μSA	56,224	Barren County, Kentucky	45,641
Bowling Green–Glasgow, KY CSA	274,192	Glasgow, KY μSA	56,224	Metcalfe County, Kentucky	10,583
Bowling Green–Glasgow, KY CSA	274,192	Franklin, KY μSA	20,788	Simpson County, Kentucky	20,788
Middlesborough–Corbin, KY CSA	172,869	Corbin, KY μSA	150,040	Laurel County, Kentucky	63,746
Middlesborough–Corbin, KY CSA	172,869	Corbin, KY μSA	150,040	Whitley County, Kentucky	37,297
Middlesborough–Corbin, KY CSA	172,869	Corbin, KY μSA	150,040	Knox County, Kentucky	29,532
Middlesborough–Corbin, KY CSA	172,869	Corbin, KY μSA	150,040	Clay County, Kentucky	19,465
Middlesborough–Corbin, KY CSA	172,869	Middlesborough, KY μSA	22,829	Bell County, Kentucky	22,829
Charleston–Huntington–Ashland, WV-OH-KY CSA	637,500; 124,878 (KY)	Huntington–Ashland, WV-KY-OH MSA	365,965; 124,878 (KY)	Cabell County, West Virginia	91,183
Charleston–Huntington–Ashland, WV-OH-KY CSA	637,500; 124,878 (KY)	Huntington–Ashland, WV-KY-OH MSA	365,965; 124,878 (KY)	Putnam County, West Virginia	56,885
Charleston–Huntington–Ashland, WV-OH-KY CSA	637,500; 124,878 (KY)	Huntington–Ashland, WV-KY-OH MSA	365,965; 124,878 (KY)	Lawrence County, Ohio	55,710
Charleston–Huntington–Ashland, WV-OH-KY CSA	637,500; 124,878 (KY)	Huntington–Ashland, WV-KY-OH MSA	365,965; 124,878 (KY)	Boyd County, Kentucky	47,751
Charleston–Huntington–Ashland, WV-OH-KY CSA	637,500; 124,878 (KY)	Huntington–Ashland, WV-KY-OH MSA	365,965; 124,878 (KY)	Wayne County, West Virginia	37,309
Charleston–Huntington–Ashland, WV-OH-KY CSA	637,500; 124,878 (KY)	Huntington–Ashland, WV-KY-OH MSA	365,965; 124,878 (KY)	Greenup County, Kentucky	35,213
Charleston–Huntington–Ashland, WV-OH-KY CSA	637,500; 124,878 (KY)	Huntington–Ashland, WV-KY-OH MSA	365,965; 124,878 (KY)	Carter County, Kentucky	26,149
Charleston–Huntington–Ashland, WV-OH-KY CSA	637,500; 124,878 (KY)	Huntington–Ashland, WV-KY-OH MSA	365,965; 124,878 (KY)	Lawrence County, Kentucky	15,765
Charleston–Huntington–Ashland, WV-OH-KY CSA	637,500; 124,878 (KY)	Charleston, WV MSA	200,170	Kanawha County, West Virginia	172,381
Charleston–Huntington–Ashland, WV-OH-KY CSA	637,500; 124,878 (KY)	Charleston, WV MSA	200,170	Boone County, West Virginia	20,251
Charleston–Huntington–Ashland, WV-OH-KY CSA	637,500; 124,878 (KY)	Charleston, WV MSA	200,170	Clay County, West Virginia	7,538
Charleston–Huntington–Ashland, WV-OH-KY CSA	637,500; 124,878 (KY)	Portsmouth, OH μSA	71,365	Scioto County, Ohio	71,365
Paducah–Mayfield, KY-IL CSA	139,309; 125,807 (KY)	Paducah, KY-IL MSA	102,259; 88,757 (KY)	McCracken County, Kentucky	67,553
Paducah–Mayfield, KY-IL CSA	139,309; 125,807 (KY)	Paducah, KY-IL MSA	102,259; 88,757 (KY)	Massac County, Illinois	13,502
Paducah–Mayfield, KY-IL CSA	139,309; 125,807 (KY)	Paducah, KY-IL MSA	102,259; 88,757 (KY)	Livingston County, Kentucky	8,863
Paducah–Mayfield, KY-IL CSA	139,309; 125,807 (KY)	Paducah, KY-IL MSA	102,259; 88,757 (KY)	Ballard County, Kentucky	7,594
Paducah–Mayfield, KY-IL CSA	139,309; 125,807 (KY)	Paducah, KY-IL MSA	102,259; 88,757 (KY)	Carlisle County, Kentucky	4,747
Paducah–Mayfield, KY-IL CSA	139,309; 125,807 (KY)	Mayfield, KY μSA	37,050	Graves County, Kentucky	37,050
none		Owensboro, KY MSA	123,012	Daviess County, Kentucky	104,898
none		Owensboro, KY MSA	123,012	McLean County, Kentucky	9,064
none		Pikeville, KY μSA	89,122	Pike County, Kentucky	54,721
none		Pikeville, KY μSA	89,122	Floyd County, Kentucky	34,401
none		Clarksville, TN-KY MSA	349,001; 84,627 (KY)	Montgomery County, Tennessee	249,935
none		Clarksville, TN-KY MSA	349,001; 84,627 (KY)	Christian County, Kentucky	70,115
none		Clarksville, TN-KY MSA	349,001; 84,627 (KY)	Trigg County, Kentucky	14,512
none		Clarksville, TN-KY MSA	349,001; 84,627 (KY)	Stewart County, Tennessee	14,439
none		Somerset, KY μSA	67,384	Pulaski County, Kentucky	67,384
Evansville–Henderson, IN-KY CSA	330,970; 57,184 (KY)	Evansville, IN MSA	270,717	Vanderburgh County, Indiana	181,995
Evansville–Henderson, IN-KY CSA	330,970; 57,184 (KY)	Evansville, IN MSA	270,717	Warrick County, Indiana	66,803
Evansville–Henderson, IN-KY CSA	330,970; 57,184 (KY)	Evansville, IN MSA	270,717	Posey County, Indiana	24,988
Evansville–Henderson, IN-KY CSA	330,970; 57,184 (KY)	Henderson, KY μSA	57,184	Henderson County, Kentucky	44,255
Evansville–Henderson, IN-KY CSA	330,970; 57,184 (KY)	Henderson, KY μSA	57,184	Webster County, Kentucky	12,929
none		Danville, KY μSA	56,985	Boyle County, Kentucky	31,632
none		Danville, KY μSA	56,985	Lincoln County, Kentucky	25,353
none		Madisonville, KY μSA	45,127	Hopkins County, Kentucky	45,127
none		Murray, KY μSA	39,421	Calloway County, Kentucky	39,421
none		Campbellsville, KY μSA	38,407	Taylor County, Kentucky	26,763
none		Campbellsville, KY μSA	38,407	Green County, Kentucky	11,644
none		none		Marshall County, Kentucky	31,659
none		none		Muhlenberg County, Kentucky	30,634
none		none		Logan County, Kentucky	28,669
none		none		Perry County, Kentucky	26,555
none		none		Grayson County, Kentucky	27,406
none		none		Harlan County, Kentucky	24,725
none		none		Rowan County, Kentucky	24,476
none		none		Ohio County, Kentucky	23,934
none		none		Mercer County, Kentucky	23,733
none		none		Johnson County, Kentucky	22,051
none		none		Breckinridge County, Kentucky	21,503
none		none		Letcher County, Kentucky	19,952
none		none		Marion County, Kentucky	20,115
none		none		Hart County, Kentucky	20,117
none		none		Wayne County, Kentucky	19,597
none		none		Harrison County, Kentucky	19,627
none		none		Adair County, Kentucky	19,423
none		none		Russell County, Kentucky	18,608
none		none		Garrard County, Kentucky	18,207
none		none		McCreary County, Kentucky	17,124
none		none		Mason County, Kentucky	16,936
none		none		Casey County, Kentucky	16,205
none		none		Fleming County, Kentucky	15,787
none		none		Morgan County, Kentucky	14,415
none		none		Knott County, Kentucky	13,321
none		none		Union County, Kentucky	12,839
none		none		Jackson County, Kentucky	13,325
none		none		Lewis County, Kentucky	12,901
none		none		Powell County, Kentucky	12,812
none		none		Breathitt County, Kentucky	12,558
none		none		Caldwell County, Kentucky	12,609
none		none		Todd County, Kentucky	12,972
none		none		Washington County, Kentucky	12,368
none		none		Owen County, Kentucky	11,601
none		none		Monroe County, Kentucky	11,191
none		none		Magoffin County, Kentucky	11,110
none		none		Carroll County, Kentucky	11,141
none		none		Martin County, Kentucky	10,697
none		none		Leslie County, Kentucky	9,627
none		none		Lyon County, Kentucky	9,123
none		none		Clinton County, Kentucky	9,139
none		none		Crittenden County, Kentucky	8,807
none		none		Hancock County, Kentucky	9,050
none		none		Trimble County, Kentucky	8,701
none		none		Nicholas County, Kentucky	7,949
none		none		Lee County, Kentucky	7,297
none		none		Elliott County, Kentucky	7,265
none		none		Fulton County, Kentucky	6,218
none		none		Wolfe County, Kentucky	6,298
none		none		Cumberland County, Kentucky	5,992
none		none		Hickman County, Kentucky	4,372
none		none		Owsley County, Kentucky	3,932
none		none		Robertson County, Kentucky	2,325
Commonwealth of Kentucky					4,606,864

The 24 core-based statistical areas of the Commonwealth of Kentucky (Note: For CBSAs comprising populations from multiple states, they are listed twice to show both their intrastate population within that CBSA as well as the CBSA's total population. Only the intrastate population is ranked.)
2025 rank	Core-based statistical area	Population				
2025 rank	Core-based statistical area	2025 estimate	Change	2020 Census	Change	2010 Census
1	Louisville/Jefferson County, KY-IN MSA (KY)	1,090,386	−0.22%	1,092,767	+6.89%	1,022,321
2	Lexington-Fayette, KY MSA	535,174	+3.55%	516,811	+12.79%	458,216
3	Cincinnati, OH-KY-IN MSA (KY)	474,868	+4.42%	454,783	+6.89%	425,483
4	Bowling Green, KY MSA	197,180	+9.76%	179,639	+13.27%	158,599
5	Corbin, KY μSA	150,040	+0.12%	149,863	+1.19%	148,099
6	Elizabethtown, KY MSA	128,666	+2.47%	125,569	+4.87%	119,736
7	Richmond–Berea, KY μSA	131,806	+7.25%	122,901	+7.20%	114,644
8	Huntington–Ashland, WV-KY-OH MSA (KY)	124,878	−1.78%	127,143	−2.22%	130,032
9	Owensboro, KY MSA	123,012	+9.38%	112,464	+5.91%	106,187
10	Pikeville, KY μSA	89,122	−5.80%	94,611	−9.44%	104,475
11	Paducah, KY-IL MSA (KY)	88,757	−0.63%	89,317	+1.00%	88,437
12	Clarksville, TN-KY MSA (KY)	84,627	−2.63%	86,909	−1.57%	88,294
13	Frankfort, KY μSA	77,874	+3.29%	75,393	+6.63%	70,706
14	Somerset, KY μSA	67,384	+3.61%	65,034	+3.08%	63,093
15	Henderson, KY μSA	57,184	−1.08%	57,810	−3.44%	59,871
16	Danville, KY μSA	56,985	+3.82%	54,889	+3.23%	53,174
17	Glasgow, KY μSA	56,224	+2.65%	54,771	+4.78%	52,272
18	Mount Sterling, KY μSA	48,428	+3.09%	46,977	+5.81%	44,396
19	Madisonville, KY μSA	45,127	−0.65%	45,423	−3.19%	46,920
20	Murray, KY μSA	39,421	+6.25%	37,103	−0.24%	37,191
21	Campbellsville, KY μSA	38,407	+3.44%	37,130	+3.80%	35,770
22	Mayfield, KY μSA	37,050	+1.09%	36,649	−1.27%	37,121
23	Middlesborough, KY μSA	22,829	−5.26%	24,097	−16.01%	28,691
24	Franklin, KY μSA	20,788	+6.09%	19,594	+13.08%	17,327
	Cincinnati, OH-KY-IN MSA	2,312,858	+2.80%	2,249,797	+5.62%	2,130,151
	Clarksville, TN-KY MSA	349,001	+8.88%	320,535	+17.01%	273,949
	Huntington–Ashland, WV-KY-OH MSA	365,965	−2.71%	376,155	−2.74%	386,768
	Louisville/Jefferson County, KY-IN MSA	1,402,509	+2.96%	1,362,180	+6.86%	1,274,757
	Paducah, KY-IL MSA	102,259	−1.19%	103,486	−0.37%	103,866

The eight combined statistical areas of the Commonwealth of Kentucky (Note: For CSAs comprising populations from multiple states, they are listed twice to show both their intrastate population within that CSA as well as the CSA's total population. Only the intrastate population is ranked.)
2025 rank	Combined statistical area	Population				
2025 rank	Combined statistical area	2025 estimate	Change	2020 Census	Change	2010 Census
1	Louisville/Jefferson County–Elizabethtown, KY-IN CSA (KY)	1,219,052	+0.06%	1,218,336	+6.68%	1,142,057
2	Lexington-Fayette–Richmond–Frankfort, KY CSA	793,282	+4.09%	762,082	+10.77%	687,962
3	Cincinnati–Wilmington, OH-KY-IN CSA (KY)	474,868	+4.42%	454,783	+6.89%	425,483
4	Bowling Green–Glasgow–Franklin, KY CSA	274,192	+7.95%	254,004	+11.31%	228,198
5	Middlesborough–Corbin, KY CSA	172,869	−0.63%	173,960	−1.60%	176,790
6	Paducah–Mayfield, KY-IL CSA (KY)	125,807	−0.13%	125,966	+0.32%	125,558
7	Charleston–Huntington-Ashland, WV-OH-KY CSA (KY)	124,878	−1.78%	127,143	−2.22%	130,032
8	Evansville–Henderson, IN-KY CSA (KY)	57,184	−1.08%	57,810	−3.44%	59,871
	Charleston–Huntington–Ashland, WV-OH-KY CSA	637,500	−3.52%	660,768	−4.70%	693,345
	Cincinnati–Wilmington, OH-KY-IN CSA	2,355,159	+2.76%	2,291,815	+5.51%	2,172,191
	Evansville–Henderson, IN-KY CSA	330,970	+1.19%	327,066	+0.58%	325,173
	Louisville/Jefferson County–Elizabethtown, KY-IN CSA	1,531,175	+2.92%	1,487,749	+6.69%	1,394,493
	Paducah–Mayfield, KY-IL CSA	139,309	−0.59%	140,135	−0.60%	140,987

== See also ==
- Geography of Kentucky
  - Demographics of Kentucky
