= Kentuckiana =

Coordinates: 38.959°N 83.979°W

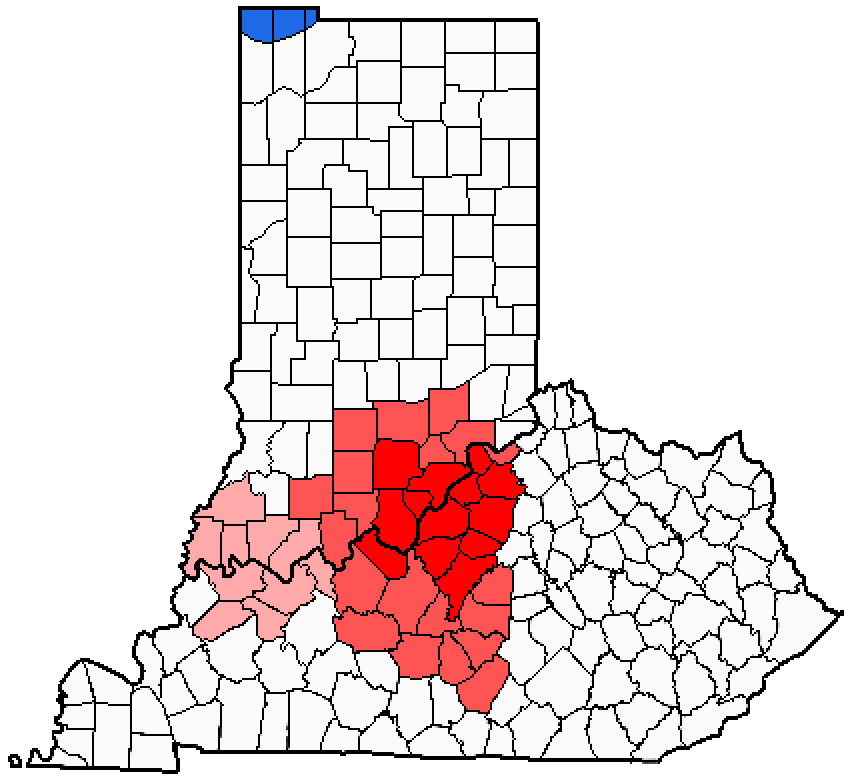
- Louisville metropolitan area Additional areas considered a part of Kentuckiana Evansville Metropolitan area and Owensboro Metropolitan area, not commonly considered a part of Kentuckiana
- Country: United States
- States: Kentucky; Indiana
- Largest city: Louisville
- Time zone: UTC−5 (EST)
  - Summer (DST): UTC−4 (EDT)

Kentuckiana, a portmanteau of Kentucky and Indiana, is the area in the Upland South region of the United States containing metropolitan areas with counties in both Kentucky and Indiana. Kentuckiana is primarily the Louisville metropolitan area, including nine counties in Kentucky (Jefferson, Bullitt, Hardin, Oldham, Meade, Shelby, Trimble, Henry, and Spencer) and five counties in Southern Indiana (Clark, Floyd, Harrison, Scott, and Washington). This area "is regularly referred to as Kentuckiana".

One other area that could lay claim to using the name is the combined metros of Evansville, Indiana and Owensboro, Kentucky, though that region identifies more on its own as "The Tri-State Area" combined. Dearborn, Ohio and Franklin Counties in Indiana make up the western portion of the Cincinnati metropolitan area and make no claims to the Kentuckiana name on their own.

== Etymology ==
The original meaning of the term Kentuckiana dates back to the 19th century as a collection of items from or relating to Kentucky. The modern meaning of term as a geographical area was coined by The Louisville Courier-Journal and The Louisville Times sometime during the 1930s. This second definition originally referred to only Jefferson County, Kentucky and Clark and Floyd Counties in Indiana- this referring to the geographic center of the Louisville metropolitan area. Since the 1980s the term has expanded to include more counties on both sides of the Ohio River. Today it refers to an indefinitely large region where Kentucky and Indiana meet, usually centered on Louisville, Kentucky.
