= Southwestern Indiana =

Coordinates: 38°30′N 87°0′W

- Region
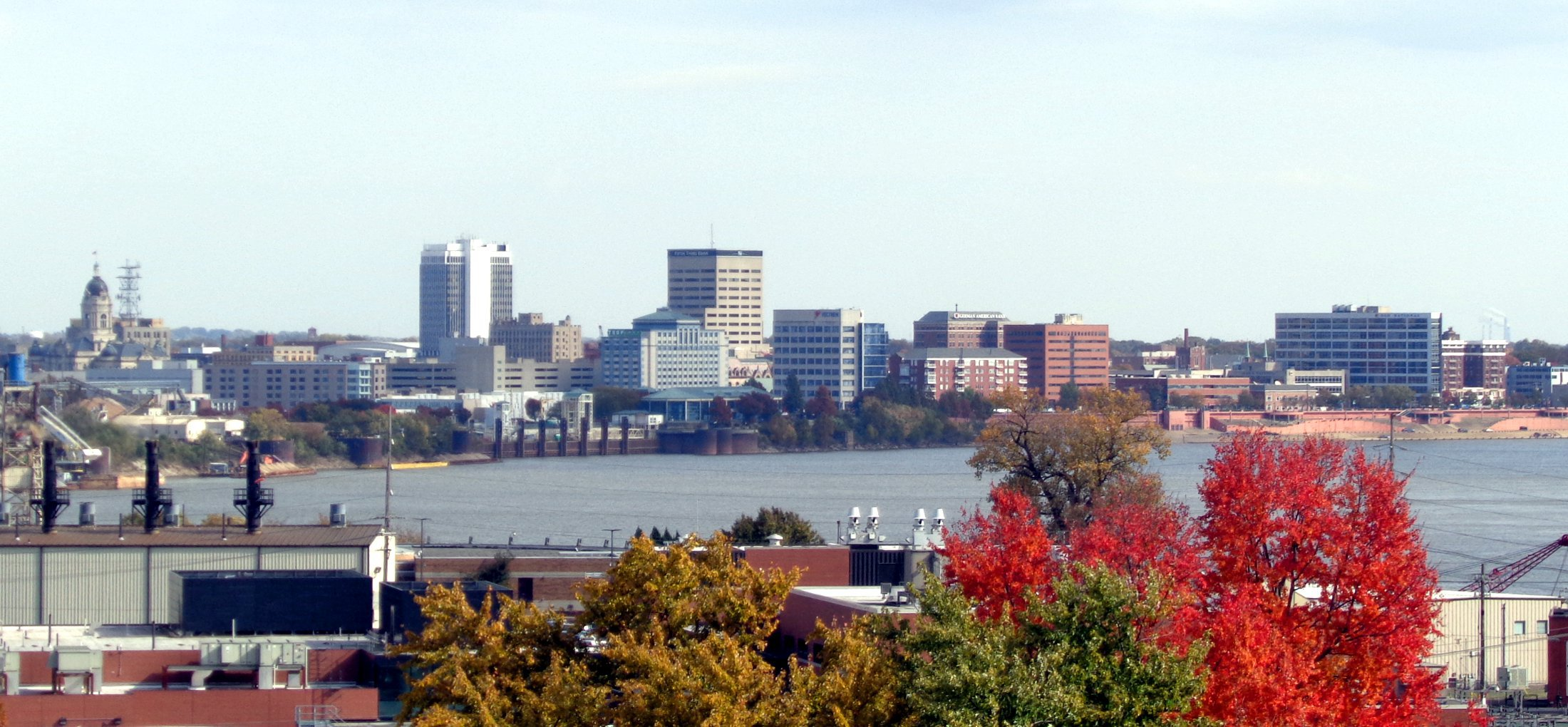
- Evansville skyline

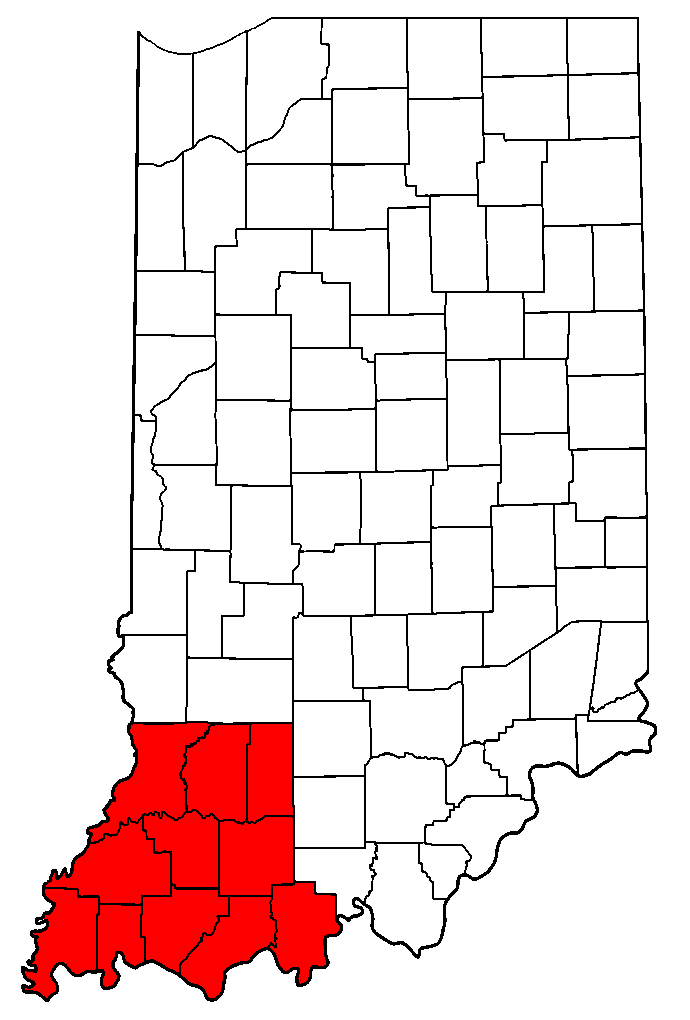
- Counties of Southwestern Indiana
- Country: United States
- State: Indiana
- Largest city: Evansville

Population
  - Total: 474,251

Southwestern Indiana is an 11-county region of southern Indiana, United States located at the southernmost and westernmost part of the state. As of the 2010 census, the region's combined population is 474,251. Evansville, Indiana's third-largest city, is the primary hub for the region, as well as the primary regional hub for a tri-state area that includes Kentucky and Illinois. Other regional hubs include Jasper, Vincennes, and Washington. Although part of a Midwestern state, certain parts of the region, largely along the Ohio River, may reflect some similarities with the neighboring Upland South (such as Kentucky or Tennessee), rather than the rest of the Midwest; the area is Midwest with occasional Southern influence, rather than Southern with a Midwest influence.

== Geography ==
Southwestern Indiana's topography is considerably more varied and complex than most of Indiana, from large tracts of forest, marshes, rolling fields, large flat valleys in the west and south, to several chains of low mountains, high hills, and sharp valleys towards the north and east. Every county in Southwestern Indiana is bounded by a river at one point, whether it be the Wabash River along the west, the Ohio River along the south, the White River, dividing the six northern counties between its two forks, or other smaller rivers. More than 50% of the boundaries of Daviess, Knox, Perry, Posey, and Spencer Counties are dictated by a river or a creek. Just under 50% of Gibson and Pike counties are dictated by a river. About 80% Knox County's boundaries are dictated by either the Wabash or the White River and its West Fork, essentially making the county a river peninsula. Additionally, over half of the area is located within the Wabash Valley seismic zone along with neighboring Southeastern Illinois.

Southwestern Indiana has clusters of separate towns of varying sizes and layouts. Vincennes is laid out in the French quadrangular, while Jasper and Princeton are laid out in a standard grid. Evansville is laid out in both modes of survey, with its downtown being mapped out from the river and the rest of the city being laid out in the standard grid.

Southwestern Indiana, like most of Southern Indiana as a whole contains several of the oldest counties in Indiana, including Knox County, the state's oldest county. In addition, four other area counties; Gibson, Perry, Posey, and Warrick, predate Indiana's statehood and the area also contains Pike County, the first county created after statehood. The youngest county, Martin, was created in January, 1820, was the state's 30th county overall of the states's 92 counties.

== Organizational definition ==
In addition to various media definitions, Southwestern Indiana is also defined by most Indiana state agencies, as well as various commercial and economic regions, as an entire area. All of Southwestern Indiana's counties are in Indiana's 8th Congressional District as of 2013. Most of Southwestern Indiana is in the Roman Catholic Diocese of Evansville except that Perry County, and Spencer County's Harrison Township – home to Saint Meinrad Archabbey – are in the Archdiocese of Indianapolis. Southwestern Indiana makes up realtor region 12 in Indiana, while nine of the counties make up Economic Growth Region 11 with Daviess and Martin in Region 8.

In addition, the southern third of Southwestern Indiana exists within the Ohio River Valley American Viticultural Area, the second-largest wine appellation in the United States. The Ohio River Valley AVA occupies all of Perry, Posey, Spencer, Vanderburgh, and Warrick Counties, nearly 90% of Gibson County, and portions of Pike and Dubois Counties in Southwestern Indiana.

== Counties ==
| IN No. | County name | Establishment date (SW Indiana) (history) (statehood) | County seat | Time zone | Population (2015) (rank) | Area sq mi (km^{2}) (Rank) | Twps | ZIP code Prefix(es) | % of Boundary by water |
|---|---|---|---|---|---|---|---|---|---|
| 14 | Daviess | February 2, 1818 (10) (29) (14) | Washington | Eastern | 32,906 (6) | 437 mi^{2} (1,130 km^{2}) (3) | 10 | 475 | 55% |
| 19 | Dubois | December 20, 1817 (7) (20) (4) | Jasper | Eastern | 42,461 (3) | 435 mi^{2} (1,130 km^{2}) (4) | 12 | 475 | 24% |
| 26 | Gibson | April 1, 1813 (2) (8) (T) | Princeton | Central | 33,775 (5) | 526 mi^{2} (1,360 km^{2}) (1) | 10 | 475/476 | 59% |
| 42 | Knox | June 6, 1790 (1) (1) (T) | Vincennes | Eastern | 37,927 (4) | 516 mi^{2} (1,340 km^{2}) (2) | 10 | 475/478 | 84% |
| 51 | Martin | January 7, 1820 (11) (33) (18) | Shoals | Eastern | 10,226 (11) | 341 mi^{2} (880 km^{2}) (10) | 6 | 475 | 18% |
| 62 | Perry | November 1, 1814 (4) (12) (T) | Tell City | Central | 19,347 (9) | 386 mi^{2} (1,000 km^{2}) (8) | 7 | 474/475 | 52% |
| 63 | Pike | December 21, 1816 (6) (16) (1) | Petersburg | Eastern | 12,594 (10) | 342 mi^{2} (890 km^{2}) (9) | 9 | 475/476 | 35% |
| 65 | Posey | November 11, 1814 (5) (13) (T) | Mt. Vernon | Central | 25,512 (7) | 429 mi^{2} (1,110 km^{2}) (5) | 10 | 476 | 63% |
| 74 | Spencer | January 10, 1818 (9) (24) (9) | Rockport | Central | 20,715 (8) | 401 mi^{2} (1,040 km^{2}) (7) | 9 | 475/476 | 73% |
| 82 | Vanderburgh | January 7, 1818 (8) (22) (7) | Evansville | Central | 181,877 (1) | 236 mi^{2} (610 km^{2}) (11) | 8 | 476/477 | 26% |
| 87 | Warrick | April 30, 1813 (3) (9) (T) | Boonville | Central | 61,897 (2) | 424 mi^{2} (1,100 km^{2}) (6) | 10 | 475/476/477 | 19% |

(T) - Establishment Date - Indiana Territory County

== Metropolitan and micropolitan areas ==
=== Metropolitan area ===
| Name | Primary city or cities | State or states | County or counties | Non-area county or counties influenced | Area | 2005 Population |
|---|---|---|---|---|---|---|
| Evansville, IN-KY; Metropolitan Statistical Area | Evansville; Henderson; Princeton | Indiana; Kentucky | IN: Gibson, Posey; Vanderburgh, Warrick; KY: Henderson, Webster | Illinois: Wabash, White; Indiana: Spencer; Kentucky: Union | 2,367 sq mi 6,130 km^{2} | 352,943 |

=== Micropolitan areas ===
| Name | Primary city | State or states | County or counties | Area | 2005 Population |
|---|---|---|---|---|---|
| Jasper, IN; Micropolitan Statistical Area | Jasper | Indiana | Dubois; Pike | 776 sq mi 2010 km^{2} | 53,211 |
| Vincennes, IN-IL; Micropolitan Statistical Area | Lawrenceville; Vincennes | Illinois; Indiana | Knox; Lawrence | 898 sq mi 2,330 km^{2} | 54,332 |
| Washington, IN; Micropolitan Statistical Area | Washington | Indiana | Daviess | 437 sq mi 1,130 km^{2} | 32,200 |

== Political status ==
- As of 2013, all of Southwestern Indiana is in the 8th Congressional District.

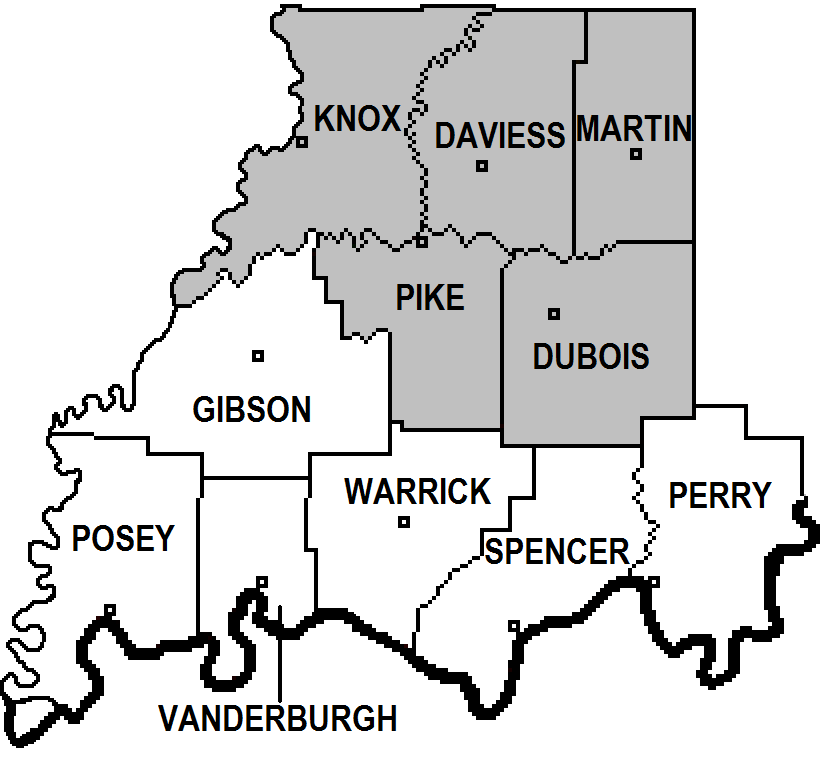
Closeup of Southwestern Indiana: White counties are on Central Time, gray counties are on Eastern Time.

| County | House District(s) | Senate District(s) | US House District |
|---|---|---|---|
| 14 Daviess | 45th 63rd 64th | 39th 48th | 8th |
| 19 Dubois | 63rd 73rd 74th | 47th 48th | 8th |
| 26 Gibson | 64th 74th 75th | 48th 49th | 8th |
| 42 Knox | 45th 64th | 39th 48th | 8th |
| 51 Martin | 62nd 63rd | 48th | 8th |
| 62 Perry | 73rd 74th | 47th | 8th |
| 63 Pike | 63rd 64th | 48th | 8th |
| 65 Posey | 76th | 49th | 8th |
| 74 Spencer | 74th 78th | 47th | 8th |
| 82 Vanderburgh | 75th 76th 77th 78th | 49th 50th | 8th |
| 87 Warrick | 75th 77th 78th | 47th 50th | 8th |
| Southwestern Indiana | 45th 62nd 63rd 64th 73rd 74th 75th 76th 77th 78th | 39th 47th 48th 49th 50th | 8th |

== Highways ==
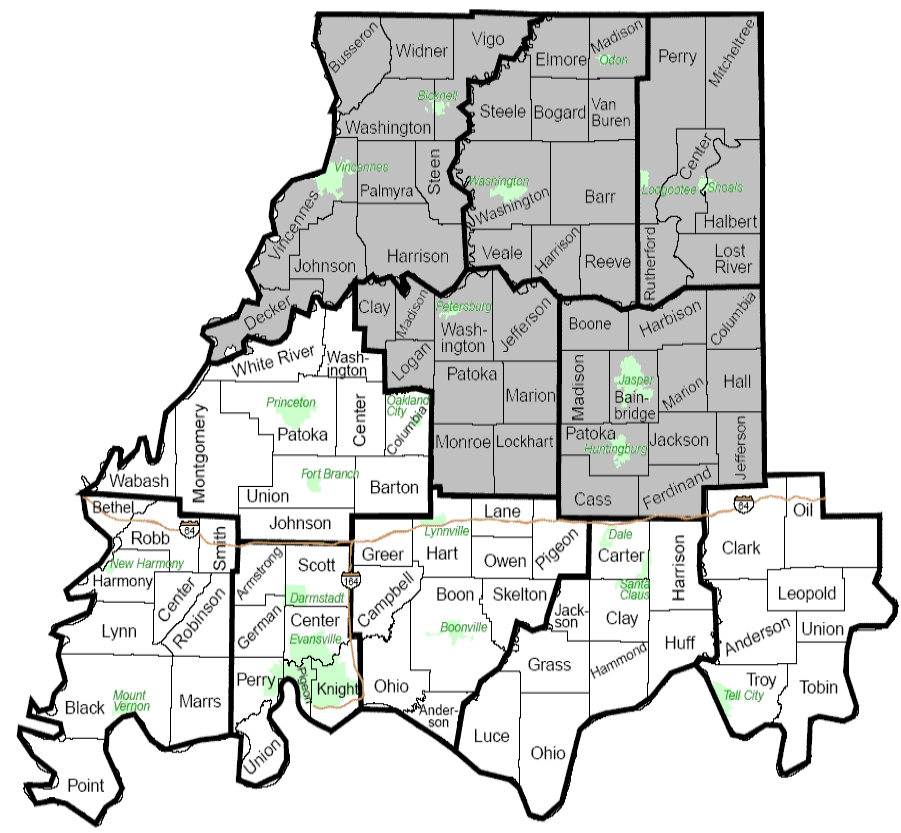
The Townships of Southwestern Indiana

=== Interstate highways ===
Interstate 64

The older interstate in the region, this stretch of I-64 has been the primary artery of east–west traffic since entering service around 1983. While relatively flat in Posey, Vanderburgh, and Gibson counties, its terrain becomes hillier as it passes through the 25.5-mile (41.0 km) stretch in Warrick County. By the time it approaches U.S. 231, the hills and valleys are sharper, transitioning into the low mountainous conditions found in Perry County as the highway leaves into Crawford County.

Interstate 69

The newer interstate in the region, this stretch of I-69 provides interstate access to Bloomington and Indianapolis. Like I-64, the terrain around Evansville is relatively flat, but becomes hillier in northeastern Gibson County, and becomes progressively hillier through Pike County. The stretch of I-69 in Daviess County between Washington and Elnora is actually flatter than the stretch in Vanderburgh County, while containing some hilly sections south of Washington, but becomes very hilly northeast of Elnora as the highway approaches Crane and leaves the area into Greene County.

=== U.S. highways ===
U.S. Route 41
US 41 extends from Miami, Florida to the Upper Peninsula of Michigan. This four-lane highway serves the western half of the region. US 41 goes through the city of Evansville, becoming six lanes between the Lloyd Expressway and Diamond Avenue. It bypasses Princeton and Vincennes before continuing north towards Terre Haute.

U.S. Route 50
US 50 extends from Baltimore, Maryland, to Sacramento, California. It is a winding two-lane road in the eastern half of the region which becomes a four-lane road in the western half, near Washington, before joining US 41 in the bypass around Vincennes. It intersects with I-69 just east of Washington. It leaves Indiana on the Red Skelton Bridge.

U.S. Route 150
Coterminous with US 50 from Vincennnes to Shoals, it breaks off and heads eastward while US 50 continues northeast.

U.S. Route 231
This now mostly new four-lane road serves the eastern half of the region. The route is in a process of relocation, as a new four-lane road is under construction from Rockport to Greene County, where it will intersect with Interstate 69.

== Culture ==
=== Annual festivals and celebrations ===
- April
  - Perry County Dogwood Tour - Perry County, Indiana
- May
  - Gastoff Spring Festival - Montgomery, Indiana
  - Historic Newburgh Wine and Arts Festival - Newburgh, Indiana
  - Spirit of Vincennes Rendezvous - Vincennes, Indiana
- June
  - Spencer County Fair - Grandview, Indiana
  - Haubstadt Somerfest - Haubstadt, Indiana
  - Evansville Freedom Festival - Evansville, Indiana
- July
  - Germania Männerchor Volksfest - Evansville, Indiana
  - Thunder on the Ohio - Evansville, Indiana
  - 4 July Festival - Otwell, Indiana
  - Gibson County Fair - Princeton, Indiana
  - Cedar Valley Bluegrass Festival - Derby, Indiana
  - Owensville Watermelon Festival - Owensville, Indiana
  - St. Wendel Bierstube - St. Wendel, Indiana
- August
  - Strassenfest - Jasper, Indiana
  - Oakland City Sweetcorn Festival - Oakland City, Indiana
  - Buffalo Trace Festival - Petersburg, Indiana
  - Tell City Schweizer Fest - Tell City, Indiana
  - Knox County Watermelon Festival - Bicknell, Indiana
  - Warrick County Fair - Boonville, Indiana
  - Vanderburgh County Fair - Darmstadt, Indiana
- September
  - Princeton Labor Day Celebration Princeton, Indiana
  - Golden Heritage Days - Princeton, Indiana
  - Dale Fall Festival - Dale, Indiana
  - Spirit of Vincennes Civil War Days - Vincennes, Indiana
  - Fort Branch Fall Days - Fort Branch, Indiana
  - Bear Hollow Fall Fest & Dasholz - St. Croix, Indiana
  - Gastoff Fall Festival - Montgomery, Indiana
  - Kunstfest - New Harmony, Indiana
  - Poseyville Autumnfest - Poseyville, Indiana
- October
  - West Side Nut Club Fall Festival - Evansville, Indiana
  - Troy Pioneer Days - Troy, Indiana
  - Spencer County Fair Octoberfest - Grandview, Indiana
  - Hoosier Heritage Fall Tour - Perry County, Indiana
  - Cannelton Heritage Festival - Cannelton, Indiana
  - Rome Courthouse Days - Rome, Indiana
  - Historic Newburgh Ghost Walks - Newburgh, Indiana
  - Old Courthouse Catacombs - Old Vanderburgh County Courthouse
  - Golden Heritage Days - Princeton, Indiana
- November and December
  - Muster on the Wabash (November) - Vincennes, Indiana (Fort Knox II)
  - Santa Claus Christmas Celebration (December) - Santa Claus, Indiana
  - Numerous Communities have Thanksgiving and Christmas Parades in November and December. There are also numerous Basketball Tournaments that occur in December, including the Gibson County Toyota Teamwork Classic.

== Central Time vs. Eastern Time ==
From 1966 to 2006, the five southwesternmost counties—Gibson, Posey, Spencer, Vanderburgh, and Warrick—observed Central Daylight Time. The six northern and eastern counties—Daviess, Dubois, Knox, Martin, Perry, and Pike, since 1982—observed year-round Eastern Standard Time as did much of the rest of the state.

In 2006, Indiana Governor Mitch Daniels pushed through legislation for all Indiana counties to observe Daylight Timeon Eastern Time onto Eastern Daylight Time. This action threw both Southwestern and Northwestern Indiana into chaos as counties started to debate whether to return to the Central Time Zone or remain in the Eastern Time Zone and start observing daylight time. This resulted, on April 2, 2006, in all of Southwestern Indiana being in the Central Time Zone.

Not even a month after the change, people began to complain about some of the same problems that people who lived in the original Central Daylight Time counties had been complaining about for years. Most prevalent was the complaint that the Crane Naval Surface Warfare Center had become a "time island". The workers' union of the base subsequently petitioned the Martin County Commissioners to repetition for a change back to Eastern Time. The resulting chain reaction resulted in all of the former Eastern Time counties, along with two Central Time counties, Gibson and Spencer, petitioning for a change to Eastern Time.

On September 20, 2007, after only 15 months and only one winter on Central Time, the DOT returned only five of the eight applicants to the Eastern Time Zone. Gibson, Perry, and Spencer counties did not have enough support to be placed there. However, three of the five counties, Daviess, Knox, and Pike, had little support either, but "convenience of commerce" was given as the reason for their time changes, despite commute patterns into Evansville and the Toyota Motor Manufacturing Indiana plant in Gibson County, the region's largest employer. In Dubois County, a heated disagreement between Huntingburg and Jasper occurred over the topic. Most of Huntingburg's industry and economy is geared towards the Central Time Zone, where Owensboro, Kentucky, and Spencer County, and the Huntingburg area's largest employers, AK Steel and Holiday World, are located. Jasper, though, stated that the majority of its business activity is aimed at the Eastern Seaboard and that returning to the Eastern Time Zone would be in the best interest of the county. The final result was that Daviess, Dubois, Knox, Martin, and Pike counties returned to the Eastern Time Zone on November 4, 2007, once again dividing Southwestern Indiana.
