= Corbin, KY Micropolitan Statistical Area =

Map highlighting the Corbin Micropolitan Statistical Area.

The Corbin Micropolitan Statistical Area, as defined by the United States Census Bureau, is an area consisting of Whitley County, Kentucky, anchored by the Whitley County portion of the city of Corbin. As of the 2000 census, the μSA had a population of 35,865 (though a July 1, 2009 estimate placed the population at 38,813).

The Corbin Micropolitan Statistical Area is part of the Corbin-London, KY Combined Statistical Area, which also contains London, KY and Clay County, KY.

== County ==
- Whitley County, Kentucky

== Communities ==
=== Incorporated places ===
- Corbin (part; principal city)
  - About 20% of the population of Corbin lives in Knox County, which is outside the statistical area.
- Williamsburg

=== Unincorporated places ===
- Wofford
- Woodbine

== Demographics ==
As of the census of 2000, there were 35,865 people, 13,780 households, and 9,894 families residing in the μSA. There were 15,288 housing units at an average density of 35 per square mile (14/km^{2}). The racial makeup of the μSA was 98.37% White, 0.34% Black or African American, 0.23% Native American, 0.20% Asian, 0.01% Pacific Islander, 0.09% from other races, and 0.76% from two or more races. 0.69% of the population were Hispanics or Latinos of any race.

The median income for a household in the μSA was $22,075, and the median income for a family was $27,871. Males had a median income of $26,518 versus $17,001 for females. The per capita income for the μSA was $12,777.

== See also ==
- Kentucky census statistical areas
