= Illinois–Indiana–Kentucky tri-state area =

Tri-state region of the United States

Coordinates: 38.0°N 87.4°W

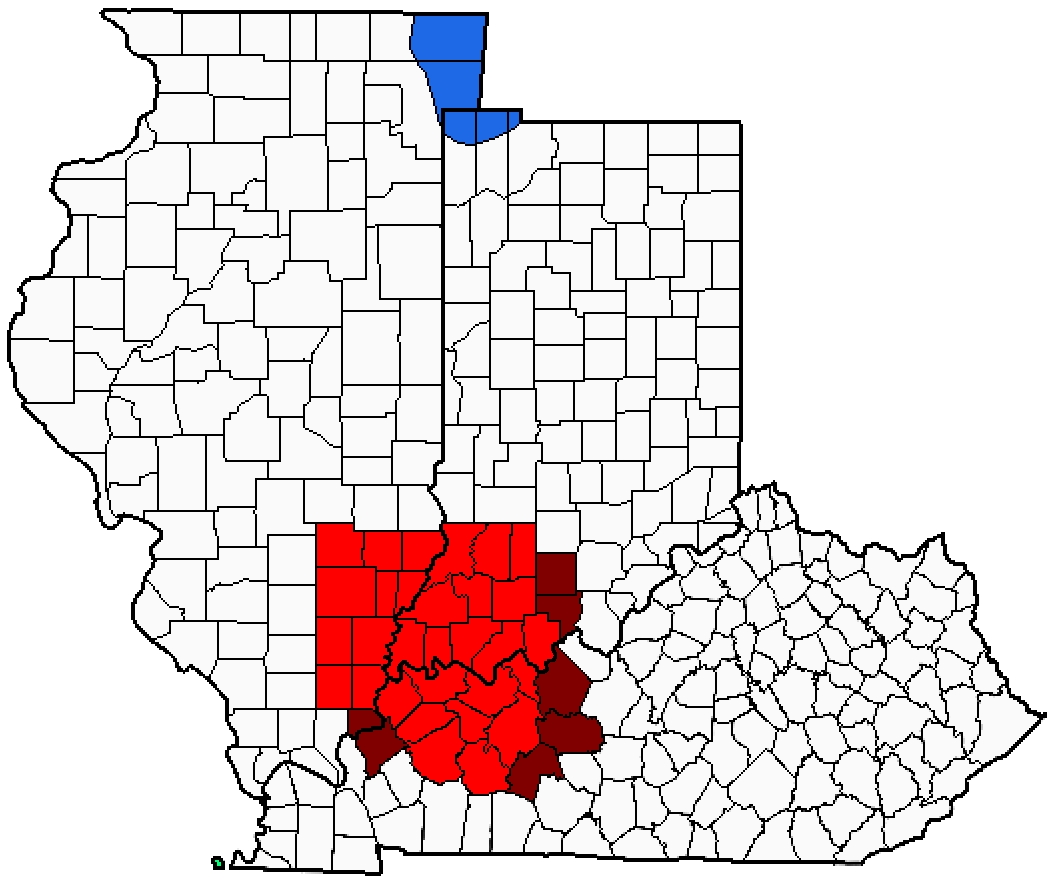
The Illinois–Indiana–Kentucky tri-state area within their states. Dark shaded counties were included only by WTVW prior to the rollout of digital television.

The Illinois–Indiana–Kentucky tri-state area is a tri-state area where the U.S. states of Illinois, Indiana, and Kentucky intersect, and a region of the Midwest and Upland South. The area is defined mainly by the television viewing area and consists of ten Illinois counties, eleven Indiana counties, and nine Kentucky counties, centered upon the Ohio and Wabash Rivers.

The 2010 population estimate of the 30-county core region is 911,613 people. With approximately 118,000 people, Evansville, Indiana, is the largest city and the principal hub for both the Evansville Metropolitan Area and Southwestern Indiana. Owensboro, Kentucky, with approximately 60,000 people, is the second-largest city and the secondary hub and the hub for the Owensboro Metropolitan Area. The other six cities with 10,000 or more people include Harrisburg, Illinois; Henderson, Kentucky; Madisonville, Kentucky; Vincennes, Indiana; Washington, Indiana; and Jasper, Indiana. The dissecting point of the three states is the confluence of the Wabash and Ohio Rivers, near the tripoint of Gallatin County, Illinois, Posey County, Indiana, and Union County, Kentucky.

Some counties along the edges may or may not consider themselves part of the area. One of the Evansville TV stations (CW 7 WTVW) also includes Hardin and Saline Counties of Illinois; Crawford and Orange Counties of Indiana; Breckinridge, Crittenden and Grayson Counties of Kentucky as part of its viewing area as well as the below-mentioned counties because, prior to the advent of digital television, the station broadcast on the VHF band (it now broadcasts on RF channel 28, in the UHF band). This was also due to its transmitter being located near Chandler, Indiana, in Warrick County, as opposed to Henderson County, like the other stations. (See map on right.)

In addition, the counties on the eastern edge of the area are included in Kentuckiana, the northern edge counties are included in the Terre Haute viewing area and the western edge counties are either included in the Paducah–Carbondale–Cape Girardeau or the St. Louis viewing areas and the southern edge are included in the Nashville–Clarksville viewing area.

== The counties ==
Note: Italicized counties were included by only WTVW prior to DTV. See above map.

Illinois:

- Clay
- Edwards
- Gallatin
- Hamilton
- Hardin
- Lawrence
- Richland
- Saline
- Wabash
- Wayne
- White

Indiana:

- Crawford
- Daviess
- Dubois
- Gibson
- Knox
- Martin
- Orange
- Perry
- Pike
- Posey
- Spencer
- Vanderburgh
- Warrick

Kentucky:

- Breckinridge
- Crittenden
- Daviess
- Grayson
- Hancock
- Henderson
- Hopkins
- McLean
- Muhlenberg
- Ohio
- Union
- Webster

== Media ==
Major local broadcast television stations are:

- WTVW Channel 7.1 CW / 7.2 (Bounce) / 7.3 (Mystery) / 7.4 (Ion) Evansville, IN
- WNIN Channel 9.1 PBS / 9.2 (Create) Evansville, IN
- WFIE Channel 14.1 NBC / 14.2 (MeTV) / 14.3 (Circle) / 14.4 (Grit) / 14.5 (Dabl) / 14.6 (True Crime Network) / 14.7 (Defy TV) Evansville, IN
- WEHT Channel 25.1 ABC / 25.2 (Laff) / 25.3 (Cozi) / 25.4 (Rewind TV) Henderson, KY
- WKOH Channel 31.1 PBS/KET / 31.2 (PBS Encore/KET2) / 31.3 (KY Channel) / 31.4 (PBS Kids) Owensboro, KY
- WEVV Channel 44.1 CBS / 44.2 (FOX/MNTV) Evansville, IN

Other area broadcast television stations are:

- WSIL-TV Channel 3.1 ABC / 3.2 (H&I) / 3.3 (Crime) / 3.4 (Court TV) / 3.5 (Ion) Harrisburg, IL – not part of the "Tri-State" viewing area; one of the principal stations of the Paducah–Carbondale–Cape Girardeau TV market
- WZDS-LD Channel 5.1 H&I / 5.2 (Start TV) / 5.3 (Movies!) / 5.4 (Decades) / 5.5 (Story) Evansville, IN
- WYYW-CD Channel 15.1 TMD / 15.2 (FAM) / 15.3 (RTV) Evansville, IN
- WJTS-CD Channel 18.1 YTA Jasper, IN
- WTSN-CD Channel 20.1 ANT / 20.2 (TFC) Evansville, IN
- WVUT Channel 22.1 PBS / 22.2 (Create) / 22.3 (PBS Kids) Vincennes, IN
- W23BV-D Channel 23.1 3ABN / 23.2 (3ABN Proclaim) / 23.3 (3ABN Dare to Dream) / 23.4 (3ABN Latino) Evansville, IN
- WDLH-LD Channel 24.1 Azteca America Evansville, IN
- WELW-LD Channel 30.1 Court TV / 30.2 (Defy TV) / 30.3 (TrueReal) / 30.4 (Scripps News) Evansville, IN
- WEIN-LD Channel 40.1 beIN Sports Xtra / 40.2 (beIN Sports Xtra en Español) / 40.3/4/5 (Ads) Evansville, IN

The major local broadcast FM radio stations are:

- 88.3 WNIN Evansville, IN
- 89.1 WVJC Mount Carmel, IL
- 89.5 WKPB Henderson, KY
- 91.1 WVUB Vincennes, IN
- 91.5 WUEV Evansville, IN
- 92.5 WBKR Owensboro, KY
- 93.5 WLYD Evansville, IN
- 93.9 WKTG Madisonville, KY
- 94.9 WYNG Mount Carmel, IL
- 96.1 WSTO Owensboro, KY / Evansville, IN
- 96.5 WSON Henderson, KY
- 98.1 WRAY Princeton, IN
- 99.5 WKDQ Henderson, KY
- 100.5 WSJD Mount Carmel, IL
- 101.9 WEKV Central City, KY / Owensboro, KY
- 103.1 WGBF Evansville, IN / Henderson, KY
- 104.1 WIKY Evansville, IN
- 105.3 WJLT Evansville, IN
- 106.1 WDKS Newburgh, IN
- 107.1 WJPS Boonville, IN / Evansville, IN
- 107.5 WABX Evansville, IN

== Fifteen largest cities ==
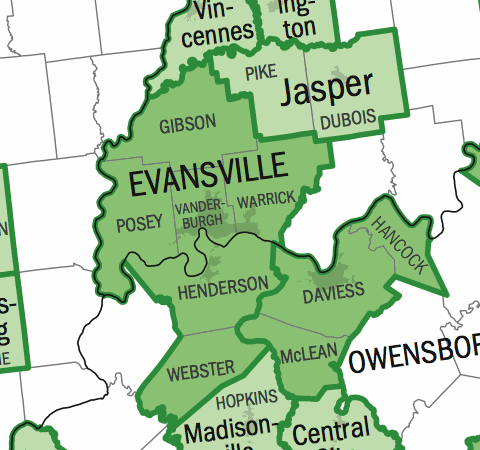
The Metropolitan and Micropolitan Areas of the Tri-State Area

Population Rank	City	State	Population 2020	County	Region
1	Evansville	Indiana	117,298	Vanderburgh	Southwestern; Indiana
2	Owensboro	Kentucky	60,183	Daviess	Pennyrile
3	Henderson	Kentucky	27,981	Henderson	Pennyrile
4	Madisonville	Kentucky	19,542	Hopkins	Pennyrile
5	Vincennes	Indiana	16,759	Knox	Southwestern; Indiana
6	Jasper	Indiana	16,703	Dubois	Southwestern; Indiana
7	Washington	Indiana	12,017	Daviess	Southwestern; Indiana
8	Olney	Illinois	8,701	Richland	Eastern Little Egypt
9	Princeton	Indiana	8,301	Gibson	Southwestern; Indiana
10	Harrisburg	Illinois	8,219	Saline	Eastern Little Egypt
11	Tell City	Indiana	7,506	Perry	Southwestern; Indiana
12	Mount Carmel	Illinois	7,015	Wabash	Eastern Little Egypt
13	Boonville	Indiana	6,712	Warrick	Southwestern; Indiana
14	Mount Vernon	Indiana	6,493	Posey	Southwestern; Indiana
15	Huntingburg	Indiana	6,362	Dubois	Southwestern; Indiana

- All of the cities on the list are county seats of their respective counties except Huntingburg, Indiana.
- Newburgh is currently debating annexation plans that would incorporate many of the surrounding developments, which would increase the population to as many as 12,000 people. If successful this would place the town behind Jasper on the above list. Newburgh would become the only town on the list.

== Metropolitan and micropolitan areas ==
=== Metropolitan areas ===
Name	Primary City or Cities	State or States	County or Counties	Non-Area County or Counties Influenced	Area	2020 Population
Evansville, IN-KY; Metropolitan Statistical Area	Evansville; Henderson; Princeton	Indiana; Kentucky	Gibson, Posey; Vanderburgh, Warrick; Henderson, Webster	Illinois: Wabash, White; Indiana: Pike, Spencer; Kentucky: Union	2,367 sq mi 6,130 km^{2}	314,049
Owensboro, KY; Metropolitan Statistical Area	Owensboro	Kentucky	Daviess, Hancock; McLean	Indiana: Perry, Spencer; Kentucky: Breckinridge, Ohio	931 sq mi 2,410 km^{2}	121,559

=== Micropolitan areas ===
Name	Primary City	State or States	County or Counties	Area	2020 Population
Central City, KY; Micropolitan Area	Central City; Greenville	Kentucky	Muhlenberg	479 sq mi 1,241 km^{2}	30,928
Harrisburg, IL; Micropolitan Area	Harrisburg	Illinois	Saline	387 sq mi 1,002 km^{2}	23,768
Jasper, IN; Micropolitan Area	Jasper	Indiana	Dubois; Pike	776 sq mi 2010 km^{2}	55,887
Madisonville, KY; Micropolitan Area	Madisonville	Kentucky	Hopkins	554 sq mi 1,430 km^{2}	45,423
Vincennes, IN; Micropolitan Area	Vincennes	Indiana	Knox	524 sq mi 1,357 km^{2}	36,282
Washington, IN; Micropolitan Area	Washington	Indiana	Daviess	437 sq mi 1,130 km^{2}	33,381

== Core counties ==
=== Eastern Little Egypt (Illinois) ===
Population Total: 128,750

County Name	County Seat	Population (2020)	Area
Clay	Louisville	13,288	437 mi^{2} (1,130 km^{2})
Edwards	Albion	6,245	223 mi^{2} (580 km^{2})
Gallatin	Shawneetown	4,946	328 mi^{2} (850 km^{2})
Hamilton	McLeansboro	7,993	436 mi^{2} (1,130 km^{2})
Lawrence	Lawrenceville	15,280	374 mi^{2} (970 km^{2})
Richland	Olney	15,813	362 mi^{2} (940 km^{2})
Saline	Harrisburg	23,768	387 mi^{2} (1,000 km^{2})
Wabash	Mt. Carmel	11,361	232 mi^{2} (600 km^{2})
Wayne	Fairfield	16,179	716 mi^{2} (1,850 km^{2})
White	Carmi	13,877	502 mi^{2} (1,300 km^{2})

=== Southwestern Indiana ===
Population Total: 477,056

County Name	County Seat	Population (2020)	Area
Daviess	Washington	33,381	437 mi^{2} (1,130 km^{2})
Dubois	Jasper	43,637	435 mi^{2} (1,130 km^{2})
Gibson	Princeton	33,011	526 mi^{2} (1,360 km^{2})
Knox	Vincennes	36,282	524 mi^{2} (1,360 km^{2})
Martin	Shoals	10,327	341 mi^{2} (880 km^{2})
Perry	Tell City	19,102	386 mi^{2} (1,000 km^{2})
Pike	Petersburg	12,250	342 mi^{2} (890 km^{2})
Posey	Mt. Vernon	25,222	429 mi^{2} (1,110 km^{2})
Spencer	Rockport	19,810	401 mi^{2} (1,040 km^{2})
Vanderburgh	Evansville	180,136	236 mi^{2} (610 km^{2})
Warrick	Boonville	63,898	424 mi^{2} (1,100 km^{2})

=== Western Coal Fields (Kentucky) ===
Population Total: 293,160

County Name	County Seat	Population (2020)	Area
Daviess	Owensboro	103,312	476 mi^{2} (1,230 km^{2})
Hancock	Hawesville	9,095	199 mi^{2} (520 km^{2})
Henderson	Henderson	44,793	467 mi^{2} (1,210 km^{2})
Hopkins	Madisonville	45,423	554 mi^{2} (1,430 km^{2})
McLean	Calhoun	9,152	256 mi^{2} (660 km^{2})
Muhlenberg	Greenville	30,928	479 mi^{2} (1,240 km^{2})
Ohio	Hartford	23,772	597 mi^{2} (1,550 km^{2})
Union	Morganfield	13,668	363 mi^{2} (940 km^{2})
Webster	Dixon	13,017	336 mi^{2} (870 km^{2})

== Daviess County ==
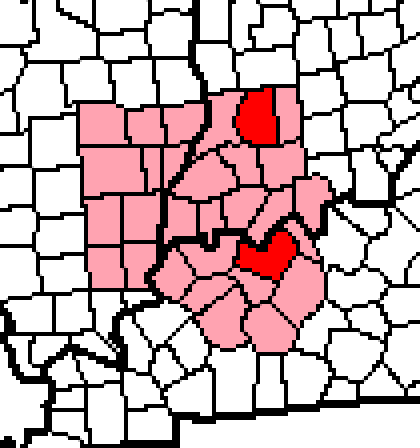
The Two Daviess Counties within the Tri-State Area.

There are two counties named Daviess in the Tri-State Area, Daviess County, Indiana (/ˈdeɪviːz/), and Daviess County, Kentucky (/ˈdeɪvɪs/). Both counties are named for Maj. Joseph Hamilton Daveiss, U.S. District Attorney for Kentucky who prosecuted Aaron Burr.

== See also ==
- Evansville Metropolitan Area
- Owensboro Metropolitan Area
- Jasper Micropolitan Area
- Southwestern Indiana
- Southern Illinois
