= Daviess County =

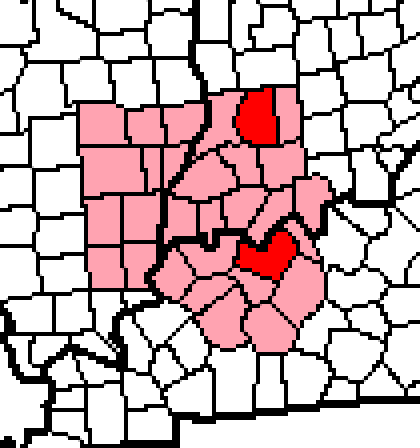
Two of the Daviess Counties are within the Illinois-Indiana-Kentucky tri-state area.

Daviess County is the name of several counties in the United States (all named for Joseph Hamilton Daveiss):

- Daviess County, Indiana
- Daviess County, Kentucky
- Daviess County, Missouri

== See also ==
- Jo Daviess County, Illinois
