= Owensboro metropolitan area =

Coordinates: 37°45′N 87°05′W

Owensboro Metro, Tri-State Area
- Metropolitan Statistical Area
- Owensboro, KY (- IN) Metropolitan Statistical Area
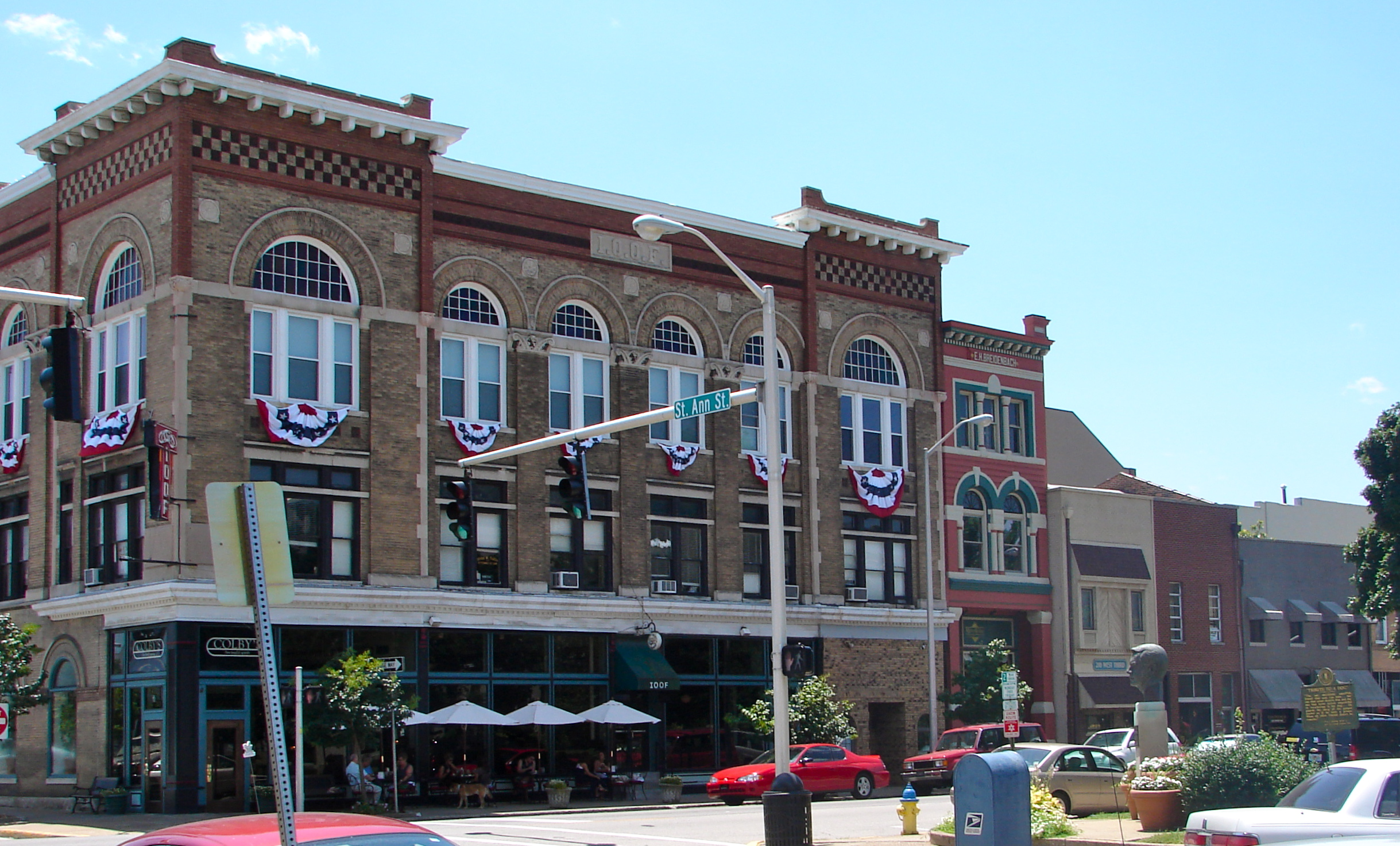
- Corner of West 3rd and St. Ann Streets in Owensboro
Interactive Map of Owensboro, KY MSA
Owenboro, KY MSA
City of Owensboro
Santa Claus-Rockport, μSA
Town of Santa Claus
Town of Rockport
- Country: United States
- State: Kentucky
- Largest city: Owensboro
- Other cities: Hawesville; Lewisport; Livermore; Calhoun; Sacramento; Island; Whitesville

Area
  - Total: 931 sq mi (2,410 km^{2})
- Highest elevation: 574 ft (175 m)
- Lowest elevation: 358 ft (109 m)

Population
  - Total: 114,752 (2,010)
  - Rank: in the U.S.

The Owensboro Metropolitan Statistical Area, as defined by the United States Census Bureau, is an area consisting of three counties in Kentucky, anchored by the city of Owensboro. As of the 2000 census, the MSA had a population of 109,875. In the 2010 Census the population was 114,752. Owensboro is part of the Illinois–Indiana–Kentucky tri-state area and sometimes, albeit seldom, referred to as Kentuckiana.

== Counties ==
- Daviess
- Hancock
- McLean
- Spencer (future)

== Communities ==
=== Incorporated places ===
- Calhoun
- Hawesville
- Island
- Lewisport
- Livermore
- Owensboro (Principal city)
- Rockport
- Sacramento
- Santa Claus
- Whitesville

=== Census-designated places ===
Note: census-designated places are unincorporated.

- Masonville

== Demographics ==
As of the census of 2000, there were 109,875 people, 43,232 households, and 30,142 families residing within the MSA. The racial makeup of the MSA was 94.46% White, 3.72% African American, 0.15% Native American, 0.37% Asian, 0.02% Pacific Islander, 0.41% from other races, and 0.87% from two or more races. Hispanic or Latino of any race were 0.90% of the population.

The median income for a household in the MSA was $34,467, and the median income for a family was $41,240. Males had a median income of $33,012 versus $21,659 for females. The per capita income for the MSA was $17,136.

== See also ==
- Evansville metropolitan area
- Kentucky statistical areas
