= Evansville metropolitan area =

Evansville Metro, Tri-state area
- Metropolitan Statistical Area
- Evansville–Henderson, IN–KY, Combined Statistical Area
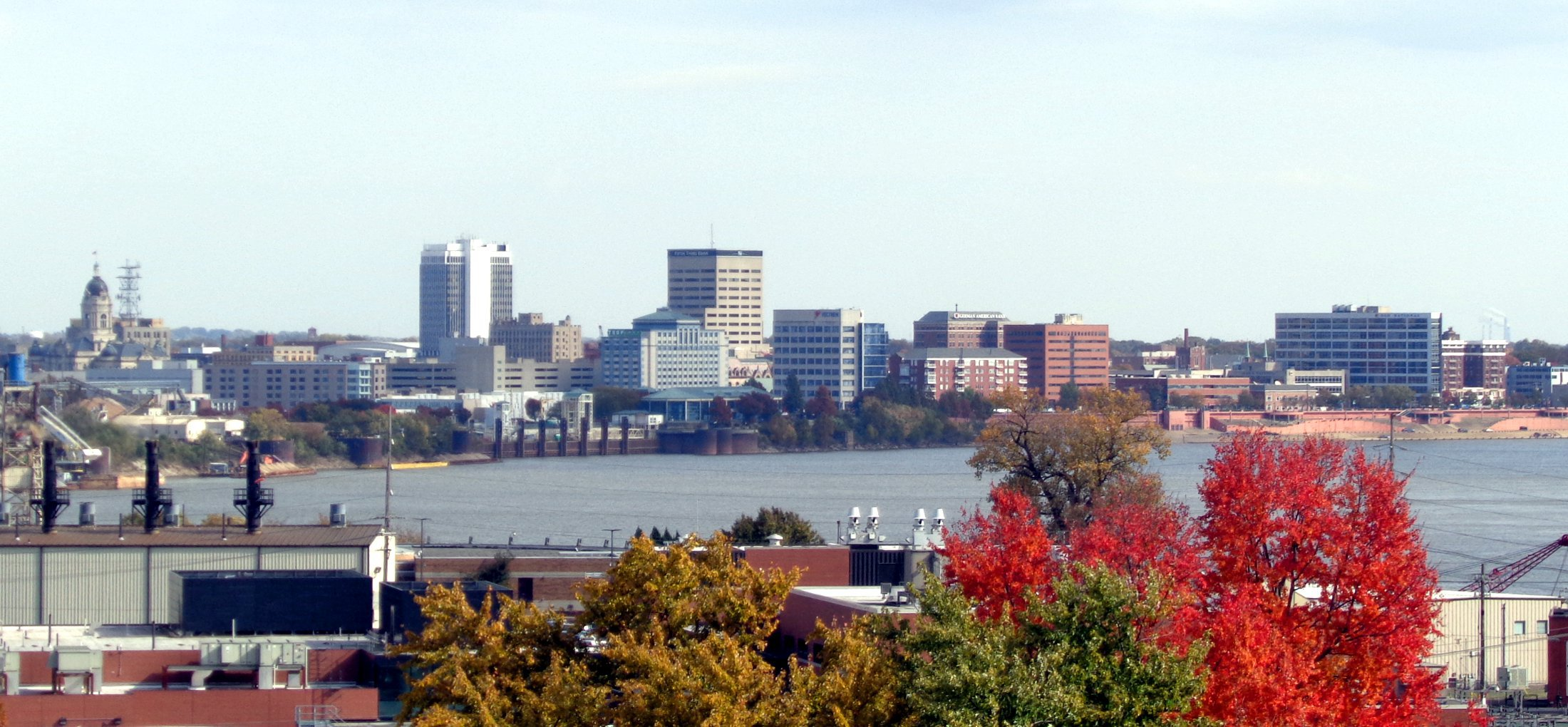
- Downtown Evansville skyline from Dreier Boulevard
Map of Evansville–Henderson, IN–KY CSA
Evansville, IN MSA
Henderson, KY µSA
City of Evansville
City of Henderson
- Country: United States
- State: Indiana; Kentucky
- Largest city: Evansville, Indiana
- Other cities: – Boonville, IN – Henderson, KY – Newburgh, IN – Princeton, IN – Mount Vernon, IN

Area
  - Total: 2,367 sq mi (6,130 km^{2})
- Highest elevation: 594 ft (181 m)
- Lowest elevation: 322 ft (98 m)

Population
  - Total: 358,676
  - Rank: 160th in the U.S.
  - Density: 150/sq mi (59/km^{2})

GDP
  - Total: $25.278 billion (2022)
- Time zone: UTC−6 (CST)
  - Summer (DST): UTC−5 (CDT)

The Evansville metropolitan area is the 164th largest metropolitan statistical area (MSA) in the United States. The primary city is Evansville, Indiana, the third most populous city in Indiana and the most populous city in Southern Indiana as well as the hub for Southwestern Indiana. Other Indiana cities include Boonville, Mount Vernon, Jasper, Oakland City, Princeton, and Vincennes. Large towns in Indiana include Chandler, Fort Branch, McCutchanville, and Newburgh. Cities in Kentucky include Henderson, Sebree, Providence, and Robards. It currently covers an area of 2,367 mi^{2} (6,130 km^{2}). It is the primary metropolitan area in the Illinois–Indiana–Kentucky Tri-State Area.

== History ==
It was originally designated the Evansville, Indiana, standard metropolitan area and was formed by the United States Census Bureau in 1950, consisting solely of Vanderburgh County, Indiana. As surrounding counties saw an increase in their population densities and the number of residents employed within Vanderburgh County, they met Census criteria to be added to the MSA. Four Indiana counties and two Kentucky counties are now a part of this MSA.

Because it includes counties in both Indiana and Kentucky, the Evansville metropolitan area is sometimes referred to as "Kentuckiana". The entire region is usually referred to as the Tri-State because of Illinois bordering Posey County less than 20 miles west of Evansville and to distinguish it from the Louisville metropolitan area.

== Major employers ==
=== Healthcare ===
- Deaconess Health System, Evansville and Newburgh
- St. Vincent Health, Evansville.

Also including: Henderson county Ky, Webster county Ky, Hopkins county Ky.

=== Industrial ===
- Toyota Motor Manufacturing Indiana
  Gibson County
- Alcoa
  Warrick County
- SABIC, formerly GE Plastics
  Posey County
- CenterPoint Energy, formerly Vectren, Operates three power plants in the area in Posey and Warrick Counties.
- Duke Energy Indiana, Operates a power plant in Gibson County.

== Current populations ==
Geographic Area	2010 Census	2000 Census	1990 Census	1980 Census	1970 Census	1960 Census	1950 Census
Evansville MSA	358,676	342,815	324,858	309,408	232,775	199,313	160,422
Gibson County, Indiana	33,503	32,580	30,159	29,233¹	28,799¹	28,567¹	27,777¹
Posey County, Indiana	25,910	27,061	25,968	26,414	21,740¹	19,214¹	19,818¹
Vanderburgh County, Indiana	179,703	171,922	165,058	167,515	168,772	165,794	160,422
Warrick County, Indiana	59,689	52,383	44,920	41,474	27,972	23,577¹	21,527¹
Henderson County, Kentucky	46,250	44,829	43,044	40,849	36,031	33,519	30,715¹
Webster County, Kentucky	13,621	14,120	13,955	14,832¹	13,282¹	14,244¹	15,555¹

¹ County was not a part of Evansville MSA at the time of this Census and the county's population is not included in MSA total.

== See also ==
- Southwestern Indiana
- Owensboro metropolitan area
- Illinois–Indiana–Kentucky tri-state area
