= Spirit of Vincennes, Inc =

Spirit of Vincennes, Inc is a non-profit organization dedicated to historic preservation and education in Vincennes and Knox County, Indiana, US. The group awards scholarships to graduates from each of the Knox County high schools, and presents a "Long Knife" award to individuals who help promote the history of Knox County.

Spirit of Vincennes, Inc coordinates reenactors for local history events and meetings. It hosts two reenactment events each year.

- The Spirit of Vincennes Rendezvous is an annual reenactment held on Memorial Day weekend at the French Commons, adjacent to the George Rogers Clark National Historical Park in Vincennes. It is also hosted by the Northwest Territory Alliance (NWTA), and the George Rogers Clark National Historical Park. The event was started in the 1970s, and is intended to introduce visitors to life along the frontier in late 18th and early 19th century Vincennes, particularly during the American Revolution. According to its webpage, the rendezvous may attract 400 to 500 reenactors and 35,000 visitors.
- The Muster on the Wabash is an 1812 reenactment held in November at Fort Knox II. It is sponsored by the Indiana State Museum, Vincennes State Historic Sites. The Muster has a special emphasis on the year 1811, when Governor William Henry Harrison gathered his forces at Fort Knox II to meet Tecumseh's growing band at the Battle of Tippecanoe.
