= Demographics of Kentucky =

Historical population
Census	Pop.	Note	%±
1790	73,677		—
1800	220,955		199.9%
1810	406,511		84.0%
1820	564,317		38.8%
1830	687,917		21.9%
1840	779,828		13.4%
1850	982,405		26.0%
1860	1,155,684		17.6%
1870	1,321,011		14.3%
1880	1,648,690		24.8%
1890	1,858,635		12.7%
1900	2,147,174		15.5%
1910	2,289,905		6.6%
1920	2,416,630		5.5%
1930	2,614,589		8.2%
1940	2,845,627		8.8%
1950	2,944,806		3.5%
1960	3,038,156		3.2%
1970	3,218,706		5.9%
1980	3,660,777		13.7%
1990	3,685,296		0.7%
2000	4,041,769		9.7%
2010	4,339,367		7.4%
2020	4,505,836		3.8%
2025 (est.)	4,606,864		2.2%
Source: 1790-2000, 1910–2020, 2025

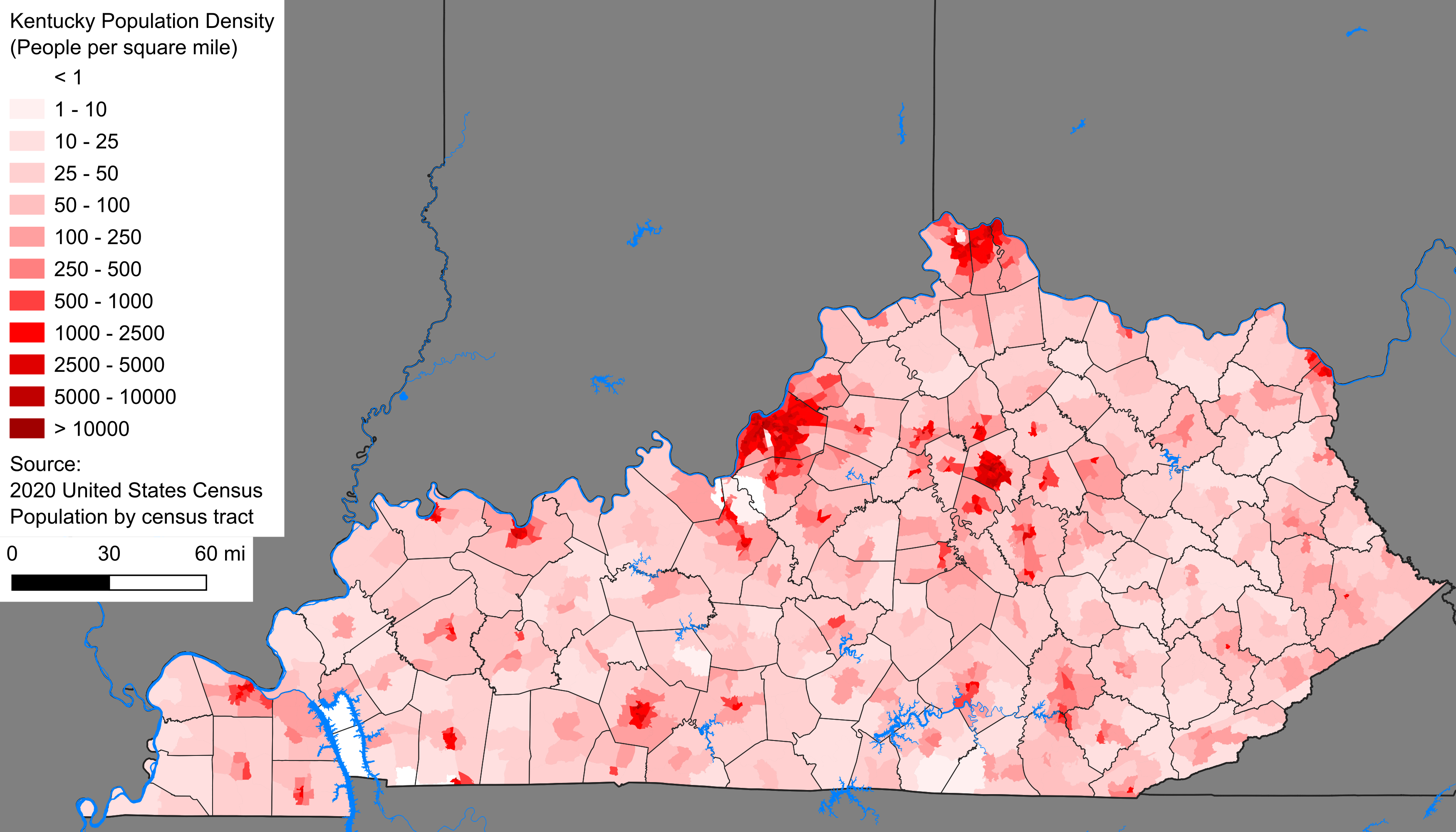
Kentucky population density map.

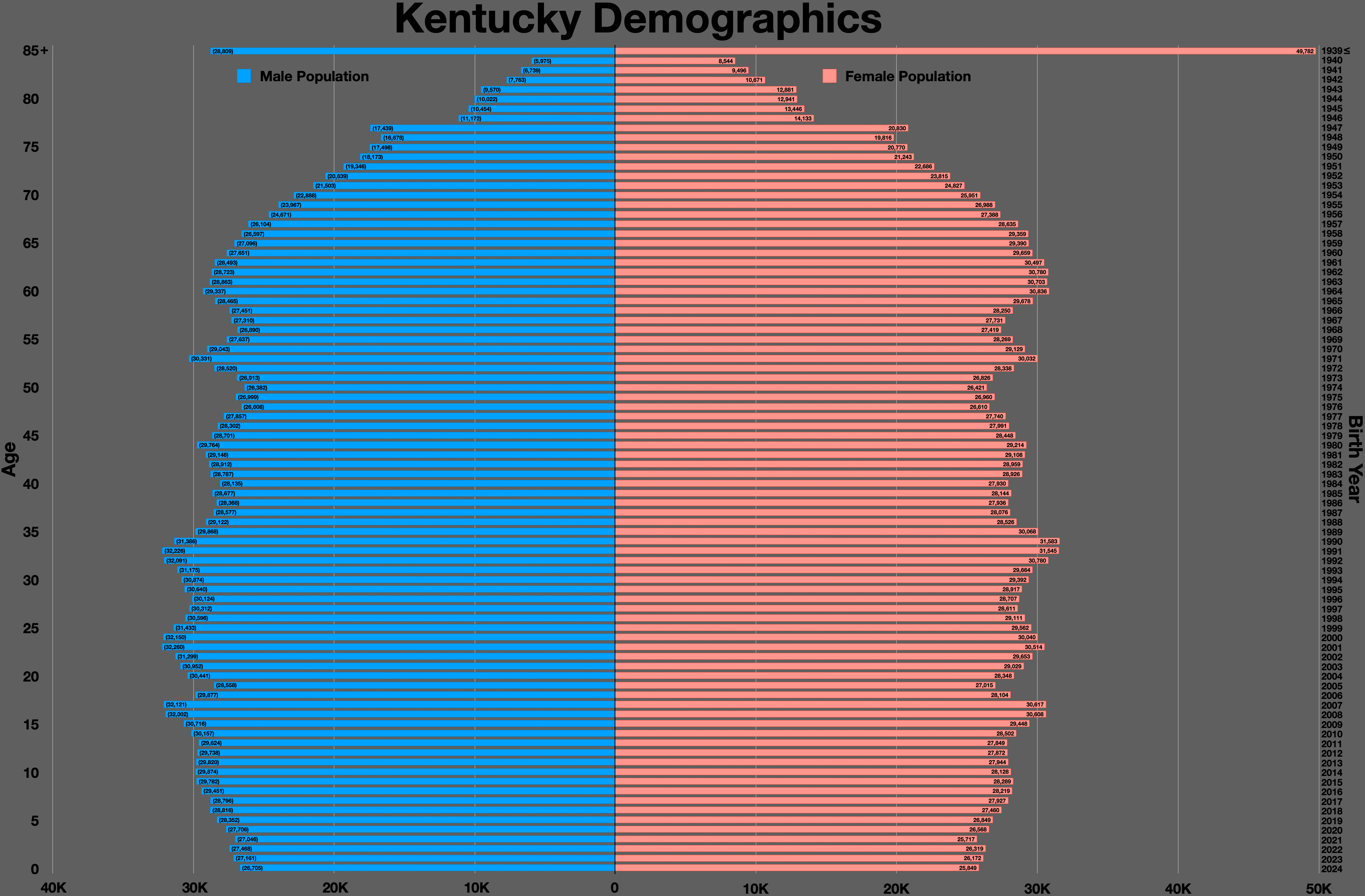
Kentucky population pyramid

As of the 2010 census, the United States Commonwealth of Kentucky had an estimated population of 4,339,367, which is an increase of 297,174, or 7.4%, since the year 2000. Approximately 4.4% of Kentucky's population was foreign-born as of 2010. The population density of the state is 107.4 people per square mile.

Kentucky's total population has grown during every decade since records began. However, during most decades of the 20th century there was also net out-migration from Kentucky. Since 1900, rural Kentucky counties have experienced a net loss of over 1 million people from migration, while urban areas have experienced a slight net gain.

The center of population of Kentucky is located in Washington County, in the city of Willisburg.

== Ancestry ==
The Commonwealth of Kentucky has an overwhelmingly Anglo-Celtic ancestral origin, according to the US Census Bureau official statistics the largest ancestry is American totalling 20.2%, an ancestral identification used by Old Stock English and Scots-Irish Americans in the Upland South whose families have been in the United States for hundreds of years. The other main ancestries were: German (14,5%), Irish (12,2%), English (10,1%) and Scottish (1.9%). In Christian County and Fulton County, African American is the largest reported ancestry. As of the 1980s the only counties in the United States where over half of the population cited "English" as their only ancestry group were all in the hills of eastern Kentucky (and made up virtually every county in this region).

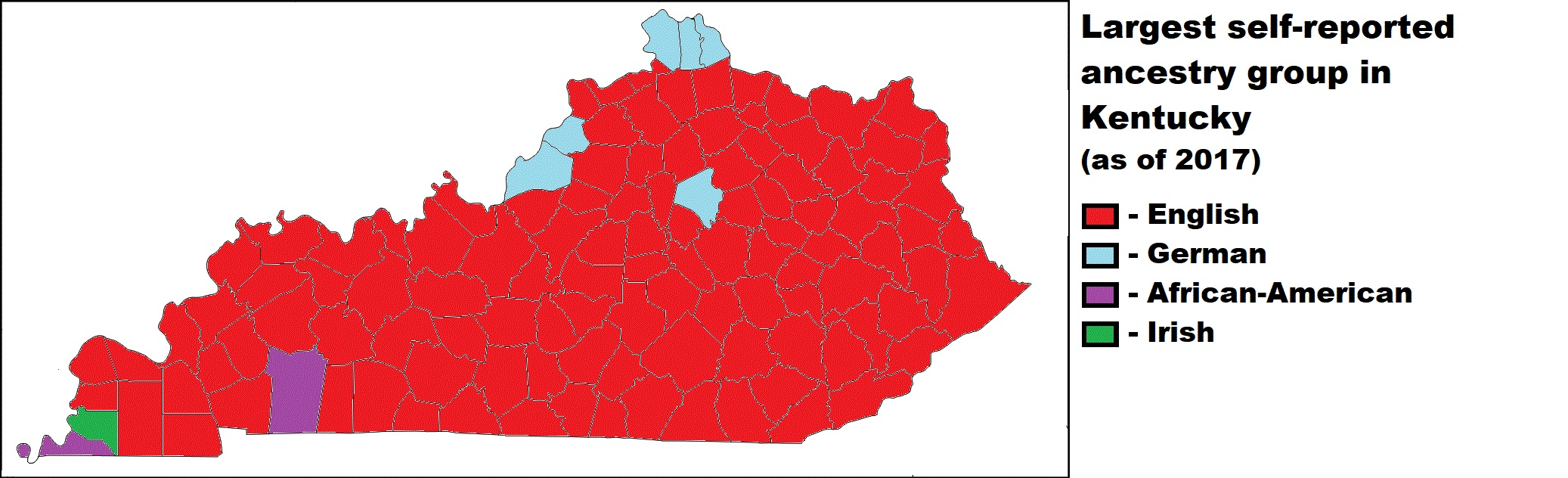
Largest ancestry group by county in Kentucky, as of 2017

In 1790, historians estimate Kentucky's population was English (52%), Scots-Irish or Scots (25%), Irish (9%), Welsh, (7%), German (5%), French (2%), Dutch (1%), and Swedish (0.2%) in ethnicity.

In the 1980 census 1,267,079 Kentuckians out of a total population of 3,660,777 cited that they were of English ancestry making them 31 percent of the state at that time.

Mexican is the most prevalent Hispanic ancestry in Kentucky.

African Americans, who made up one-fourth of Kentucky's population prior to the Civil War, declined in number as many moved to the industrial North in the Great Migration. Today 44.2% of Kentucky's African American population is in Jefferson County and 52% are in the Louisville Metro Area. Other areas with high concentrations, besides Christian and Fulton Counties, are the city of Paducah, the Bluegrass, and the city of Lexington.

Demographics of Kentucky (csv)
By race	White	Black	AIAN*	Asian	NHPI*
2000 (total population)	91.53%	7.76%	0.61%	0.92%	0.08%
2000 (Hispanic only)	1.35%	0.10%	0.04%	0.02%	0.01%
2005 (total population)	91.27%	7.98%	0.58%	1.10%	0.08%
2005 (Hispanic only)	1.80%	0.12%	0.04%	0.03%	0.01%
Growth 2000–05 (total population)	2.97%	6.16%	-2.21%	23.46%	9.78%
Growth 2000–05 (non-Hispanic only)	2.44%	5.94%	-3.28%	23.07%	7.98%
Growth 2000–05 (Hispanic only)	37.97%	22.34%	13.51%	38.48%	19.80%
* AIAN is American Indian or Alaskan Native; NHPI is Native Hawaiian or Pacific Islander

=== Ancestries ===
Ancestry	Number	%
Afghan	726	
Albanian	116	

== Vital statistics ==
Year	Population	Live births	Deaths	Natural change	Crude birth rate (per 1,000)	Crude death rate (per 1,000)	Natural change (per 1,000)	Crude migration change (per 1,000)
2000	4,049,021	56,029	39,504	16,525	13.8	9.8	4.0	
2001	4,068,132	54,658	39,861	14,797	13.4	9.8	3.6	1.1
2002	4,089,875	54,233	40,697	13,536	13.3	10.0	3.3	2.0
2003	4,117,170	55,236	40,241	14,995	13.4	9.8	3.6	3.0
2004	4,146,101	55,720	38,646	17,074	13.4	9.3	4.1	2.9
2005	4,182,742	56,444	40,223	16,221	13.5	9.6	3.9	4.9
2006	4,219,239	58,250	40,102	18,148	13.8	9.5	4.3	4.3
2007	4,256,672	59,368	40,090	19,278	13.9	9.4	4.5	4.3
2008	4,289,878	58,375	41,329	17,046	13.6	9.6	4.0	3.8
2009	4,317,074	57,551	41,380	16,171	13.3	9.6	3.7	2.6
2010	4,349,159	55,784	41,983	13,801	12.8	9.7	3.1	4.2
2011	4,374,302	55,370	42,626	12,744	12.7	9.7	3.0	2.8
2012	4,394,147	55,758	43,664	12,094	12.7	9.9	2.8	1.8
2013	4,415,978	55,686	43,759	11,927	12.6	9.9	2.7	2.2
2014	4,428,854	56,170	44,838	11,332	12.7	10.1	2.6	0.3
2015	4,443,778	55,971	46,564	9,407	12.6	10.5	2.1	1.2
2016	4,457,755	55,449	47,827	7,622	12.4	10.7	1.7	1.4
2017	4,475,829	54,752	48,212	6,540	12.2	10.8	1.4	2.6
2018	4,487,302	53,922	48,707	5,215	12.0	10.9	1.1	1.4
2019	4,498,163	53,069	48,990	4,079	11.8	10.9	0.9	1.5
2020	4,508,271	51,668	55,880	-4,212	11.5	12.4	-0.9	3.2
2021	4,508,348	52,214	60,303	-8,089	11.6	13.4	-1.8	1.8
2022	4,521,238	52,315	57,053	-4,738	11.6	12.6	-1.0	3.9
2023	4,549,953	51,984	53,044	-1,060	11.4	11.7	-0.3	6.5
2024	4,584,046	52,913	52,387	526	11.5	11.4	0.1	7.3
2025	4,606,864	52,737	52,794	-57	11.4	11.5	-0.1	5.0

== Birth data ==
Note: Births in table don't add up, because Hispanics are counted both by their ethnicity and by their race, giving a higher overall number.

Live Births by Single Race/Ethnicity of Mother
Race	2014	2015	2016	2017	2018	2019	2020	2021	2022	2023	2024
White	46,701 (83.1%)	46,344 (82.8%)	45,146 (81.4%)	44,280 (80.9%)	43,317 (80.3%)	42,215 (79.5%)	40,726 (78.8%)	41,061 (78.6%)	40,484 (77.4%)	39,667 (76.3%)	39,603 (74.8%)
Black	5,571 (9.9%)	5,507 (9.8%)	4,902 (8.8%)	5,006 (9.1%)	4,950 (9.2%)	5,034 (9.5%)	5,154 (10.0%)	5,124 (9.8%)	5,043 (9.6%)	4,936 (9.5%)	4,829 (9.1%)
Asian	1,275 (2.3%)	1,315 (2.3%)	1,182 (2.1%)	1,173 (2.1%)	1,144 (2.1%)	1,078 (2.0%)	1,099 (2.1%)	1,058 (2.0%)	1,151 (2.2%)	1,136 (2.2%)	1,091 (2.1%)
Pacific Islander	...	...	67 (0.1%)	68 (0.1%)	79 (0.1%)	69 (0.1%)	75 (0.1%)	82 (0.1%)	92 (0.2%)	100 (0.2%)	113 (0.2%)
Hispanic (any race)	2,819 (5.0%)	3,000 (5.3%)	3,137 (5.6%)	3,162 (5.8%)	3,226 (6.0%)	3,450 (6.5%)	3,472 (6.7%)	3,737 (7.1%)	4,291 (8.2%)	4,852 (9.3%)	5,660 (10.7%)
Total	56,170 (100%)	55,971 (100%)	55,449 (100%)	54,752 (100%)	53,922 (100%)	53,069 (100%)	51,668 (100%)	52,214 (100%)	52,315 (100%)	51,984 (100%)	52,913 (100%)

- Since 2016, data for births of White Hispanic origin are not collected, but included in one Hispanic group; persons of Hispanic origin may be of any race.

== Religion ==
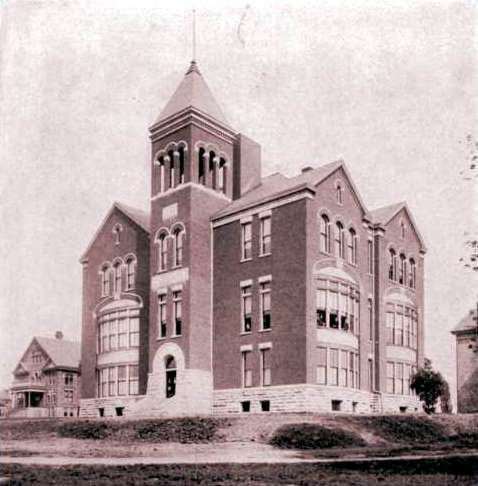
Lexington Theological Seminary (then College of the Bible), 1904.

In 2000, The Association of Religion Data Archives reported that of Kentucky's 4,041,769 residents:

- 33.68% were members of evangelical Protestant churches
  - Southern Baptist Convention (979,994 members, 24.25%)
  - Christian churches and churches of Christ (106,638 members, 2.64%)
  - Church of Christ (58,602 members, 1.45%)
- 10.05% were Roman Catholics
- 8.77% belonged to mainline Protestant churches
  - United Methodist Church (208,720 members, 5.16%)
  - Christian Church (Disciples of Christ) (67,611 members, 1.67%)
- 0.05% were members of orthodox churches
- 0.88% were affiliated with other theologies
- 46.57% were not affiliated with any church.

Today Kentucky is home to several seminaries. Southern Baptist Theological Seminary in Louisville is the principal seminary for the Southern Baptist Convention. Louisville is also the home of the Louisville Presbyterian Theological Seminary. Lexington has two seminaries, Lexington Theological Seminary, and the Baptist Seminary of Kentucky. Asbury Theological Seminary is located in nearby Wilmore. In addition to seminaries, there are several colleges affiliated with denominations. Transylvania in Lexington is affiliated with the Disciples of Christ. In Louisville, Bellarmine and Spalding are affiliated with the Roman Catholic Church. In Owensboro, Kentucky, Kentucky Wesleyan College is associated with the Methodist Church and Brescia University is associated with the Roman Catholic Church. Louisville is also home to the headquarters of the Presbyterian Church (USA) and their printing press. Louisville is also home to a sizable Muslim and Jewish population.

Religious movements were important in the early history of Kentucky. Perhaps the most famous event was the interdenominational revival in August 1801 at the Cane Ridge Meeting House in Bourbon County. As part of what is now known as the "Western Revival", thousands began meeting around a Presbyterian communion service on August 6, 1801, and ended six days later on August 12, 1801, when both humans and horses ran out of food. Some claim that the Cane Ridge Revival was propagated from an earlier camp meeting at Red River Meeting House in Logan County.
