= Louisville metropolitan area =

Geographic region in Kentucky and southern Indiana, US

- Metropolitan statistical area
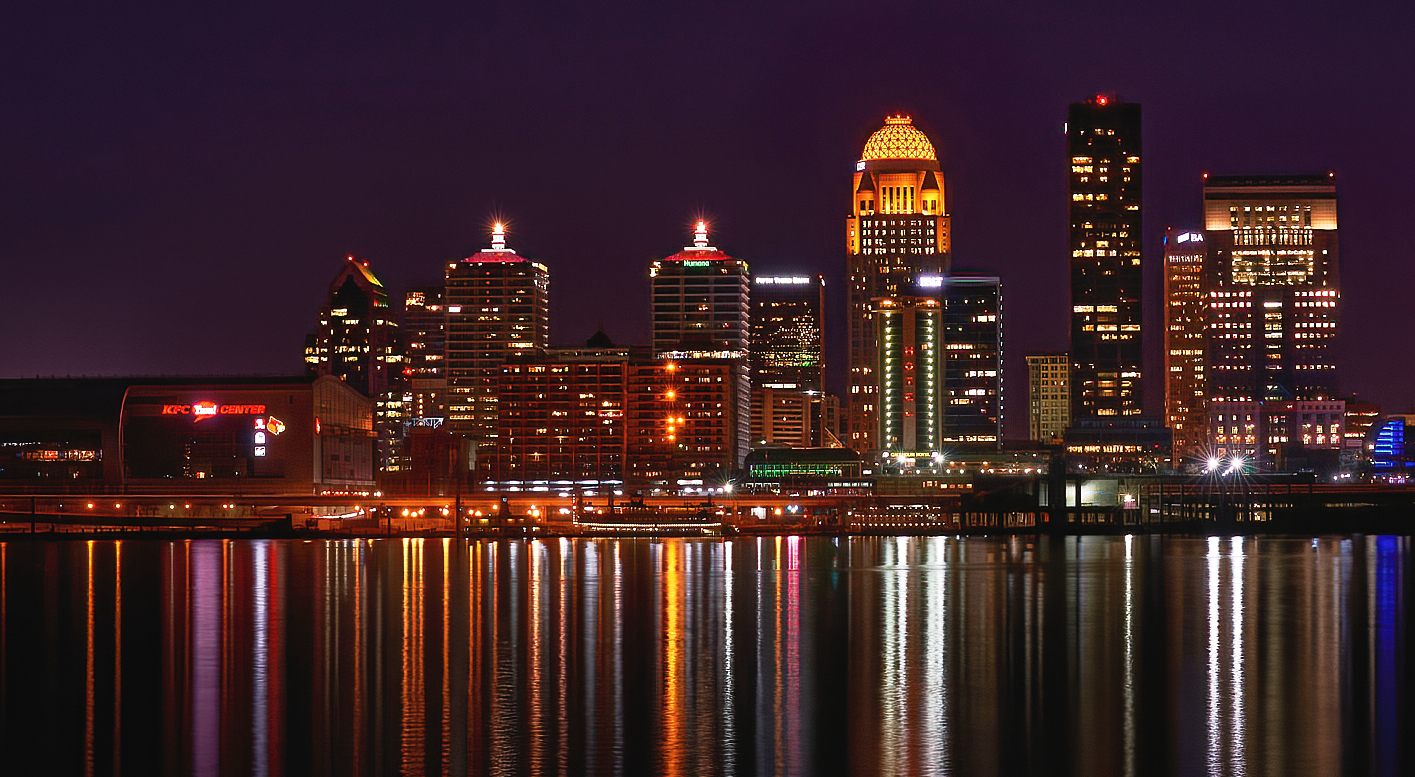
Louisville/Jefferson County–Elizabethtown, KY–IN CSA
Louisville/Jefferson County (balance), KY
Louisville/Jefferson County, KY–IN MSA
Elizabethtown, KY MSA
- Country: United States
- States: Kentucky; Indiana
- Principal city: Louisville

Area
  - Urban: 477.2 sq mi (1,236 km^{2})
  - MSA: 4,135.4 sq mi (10,711 km^{2})

Population (2020)
  - Urban: 974,397 (US: 48th)
  - Urban density: 2,147.9/sq mi (829.3/km^{2})
  - MSA: 1,362,180 (US: 43rd (Note: The United States MSA table excludes the San Juan, Puerto Rico MSA which has a higher population than Louisville.))
  - CSA: 1,512,133 (US: 38th)

GDP
  - MSA: $90.836 billion (2022)
- Time zone: UTC−5 (EST)
  - Summer (DST): UTC−4 (EDT)

The Louisville metropolitan area is the 43rd largest metropolitan statistical area (MSA) in the United States. It had a population of 1,395,855 in 2020 according to the latest official census, and its principal city is Louisville, Kentucky.

The metropolitan area was originally formed by the United States Census Bureau in 1950 and consisted of the Kentucky county of Jefferson and the Indiana counties of Clark and Floyd. As surrounding counties saw an increase in their population densities and the number of their residents employed within Jefferson County, they met Census criteria to be added to the MSA. Jefferson County, Kentucky, plus eleven outlying counties – seven in Kentucky and four in Southern Indiana – are now a part of this MSA. Two other counties, one each in Kentucky and Indiana, were part of the MSA in the 2000 and 2010 U.S. Censuses, but were spun off by the Census Bureau into their own Micropolitan Statistical Areas (μSA) in 2013 and 2018 respectively.

The formal name given to the area by the Census Bureau is the Louisville/Jefferson County, Kentucky–Indiana, metropolitan statistical area, though it is regularly referred to as Kentuckiana. It is now the primary MSA of the Louisville/Jefferson County–Elizabethtown, KY-IN Combined Statistical Area, as defined by the United States Bureau of the Census in 2000 and recently redefined in 2018. The combined statistical area (CSA) adds the counties of Hardin County, Kentucky, and LaRue County, Kentucky. In 2020, the Census Bureau measured the combined statistical area's population at 1,601,309.

Before the 2023 definitions were released, the CSA had two additional micropolitan statistical areas, Bardstown, Kentucky μSA and Scottsburg, Indiana μSA. In 2023, the Bardstown μSA was dissolved with Nelson County being added to the Louisville MSA and Scottsburg, Indiana μSA was dissolved, no longer considered a statistical area by the OMB. In addition, Meade County, which was part of the Elizabethtown MSA, was detached and added to the Louisville MSA. Trimble County, on the northeastern edge of the Louisville MSA, was detached in 2023.

== Definitions ==
As of 2023, the U.S. Office of Management and Budget defines the Louisville–Jefferson County MSA as including Bullitt, Henry, Jefferson, Meade, Nelson, Oldham, and Shelby Counties in Kentucky and Clark, Floyd, Harrison, and Washington Counties in Indiana. The larger Louisville/Jefferson County–Elizabethtown CSA adds the Elizabethtown, Kentucky, MSA, consisting of Hardin and LaRue Counties.

=== Counties ===
Louisville–Jefferson County MSA

- Bullitt County, Kentucky (80,246)
- Clark County, Indiana (116,973)
- Floyd County, Indiana (77,071)
- Harrison County, Indiana (39,898)
- Henry County, Kentucky (16,006)
- Jefferson County, Kentucky (771,158)
- Meade County, Kentucky (28,154)
- Nelson County, Kentucky (45,640)
- Oldham County, Kentucky (66,415)
- Shelby County, Kentucky (47,421)
- Spencer County, Kentucky (18,507)
- Washington County, Indiana (27,827)

Elizabethtown–Fort Knox, Kentucky MSA

- Hardin County, Kentucky (108,071)
- LaRue County, Kentucky (14,205)

=== Municipalities ===
Principal city

- Louisville, Kentucky

In 2003, the Jefferson County government merged with that of its largest city and county seat, Louisville, forming a new entity, the Louisville–Jefferson County Metro Government (official long form) or Louisville Metro (official short form). All small cities within Jefferson County became part of the new Louisville Metro government while retaining their city governments. For statistical and ranking purposes, the United States Census Bureau uses the statistical entity Louisville–Jefferson County metro government (balance), Kentucky, to represent the portion of the consolidated city-county of Louisville–Jefferson County that does not include any of the 83 separate incorporated places (municipalities) located within the city and county.

Louisville Metro (771,158)
Louisville–Jefferson County (balance) (621,349)

Municipalities with more than 25,000 people

- Jeffersontown, Kentucky*
- Jeffersonville, Indiana
- New Albany, Indiana

Municipalities with 10,000 to 25,000 people

- Clarksville, Indiana
- Lyndon, Kentucky*
- Mount Washington, Kentucky
- St. Matthews, Kentucky*
- Shelbyville, Kentucky
- Shepherdsville, Kentucky
- Shively, Kentucky*

Municipalities with fewer than 10,000 people

- Anchorage*
- Audubon Park*
- Bancroft*
- Barbourmeade*
- Beechwood Village*
- Bellemeade*
- Bellewood*
- Blue Ridge Manor*
- Borden
- Brandenburg
- Briarwood*
- Broeck Pointe*
- Brownsboro Farm*
- Brownsboro Village*
- Cambridge*
- Campbellsburg
- Charlestown
- Clarksville
- Coldstream*
- Corydon
- Crandall
- Creekside*
- Crestwood
- Crossgate*
- Douglass Hills*
- Druid Hills*
- Ekron
- Elizabeth
- Eminence
- Fincastle*
- Forest Hills*
- Fox Chase
- Fredericksburg
- Georgetown
- Glenview Hills*
- Glenview Manor*
- Glenview*
- Goose Creek*
- Goshen
- Graymoor-Devondale*
- Green Spring*
- Greenville
- Hardinsburg
- Hebron Estates
- Heritage Creek*
- Hickory Hill*
- Hills and Dales*
- Hillview
- Hollow Creek*
- Hollyvilla*
- Houston Acres*
- Hunters Hollow
- Hurstbourne Acres*
- Hurstbourne*
- Indian Hills*
- Kingsley*
- La Grange
- Laconia
- Lanesville
- Langdon Place*
- Lebanon Junction
- Lincolnshire*
- Little York
- Livonia
- Lynnview*
- Manor Creek*
- Maryhill Estates*
- Mauckport
- Meadow Vale*
- Meadowbrook Farm*
- Meadowview Estates*
- Middletown*
- Milltown
- Mockingbird Valley*
- Moorland*
- Muldraugh
- Murray Hill*
- New Amsterdam
- New Castle
- New Middletown
- New Pekin
- Norbourne Estates*
- Northfield*
- Norwood*
- Old Brownsboro Place*
- Orchard Grass Hills
- Palmyra
- Parkway Village*
- Pewee Valley
- Pioneer Village
- Plantation*
- Pleasureville
- Poplar Hills*
- Prospect*‡
- Richlawn*
- River Bluff
- Riverwood*
- Rolling Fields*
- Rolling Hills*
- Saltillo
- Sellersburg
- Seneca Gardens*
- Simpsonville
- Smithfield
- South Park View*
- Spring Mill*
- Spring Valley*
- St. Regis Park*
- Strathmoor Manor*
- Strathmoor Village*
- Sycamore*
- Taylorsville
- Ten Broeck*
- Thornhill*
- Utica
- Vine Grove
- Watterson Park*
- Wellington*
- West Buechel*
- West Point
- Westwood*
- Wildwood*
- Windy Hills*
- Woodland Hills*
- Woodlawn Park*
- Worthington Hills*

*Part of Louisville Metro
‡Prospect lies in both Jefferson and Oldham Counties. The portion within Jefferson County is part of Louisville Metro.

== Historical statistics ==
=== Metropolitan statistical area ===
Geographic area	2020 Census	2010 Census	2000 Census	1990 Census	1980 Census	1970 Census	1960 Census	1950 Census
Louisville–Jefferson County, Kentucky–Indiana, MSA (Note: Named Louisville, KY-IN Standard Metropolitan Area (SMA) in 1950, Louisville, KY-IN Standard Metropolitan Statistical Area (SMSA) from 1960 to 1981, and Louisville, KY-IN Metropolitan Statistical Area (MSA) from 1983 to 2003.)	1,395,855	1,307,647	1,161,975	962,851	906,152	826,553	725,139	576,900
Clark County, Indiana	121,093	110,232	96,472	87,777	88,838	75,876	62,795	48,330
Floyd County, Indiana	80,484	74,478	70,823	64,404	61,169	55,622	51,397	43,955
Harrison County, Indiana	39,654	39,364	34,325	29,890	27,276 (Note: County was not a part of Louisville, KY-IN MSA at the time of this Census and the county's population is not included in MSA total.)	20,423	19,207	17,858
Scott County, Indiana	24,384	24,181	22,960	20,991	20,422	17,144	14,463	11,519
Washington County, Indiana	28,182	28,262	27,223	23,717	21,932	19,278	17,819	16,520
Bullitt County, Kentucky	82,217	74,319	61,236	47,567	43,346	26,090	15,726	11,349
Henry County, Kentucky	15,678	15,416	15,060	12,823	12,740	10,910	10,987	11,394
Jefferson County, Kentucky	782,969	741,096	693,604	664,937	685,004	695,055	610,947	484,615
Meade County, Kentucky	30,003	28,602	26,349	24,170	22,854	17,796	18,898	9,422
Nelson County, Kentucky (Note: County is no longer included in the MSA as of 2016.)	46,738	43,437	37,477	29,710	27,584	23,477	22,168	19,521
Oldham County, Kentucky	67,607	60,316	46,178	43,455	27,795	14,687	13,388	11,018
Shelby County, Kentucky	49,024	42,074	33,337	24,824	23,328	18,999	18,493	17,912
Spencer County, Kentucky	19,351	17,061	11,766	6,801	5,929	5,488	5,680	6,157
Trimble County, Kentucky	8,471	8,809	8,125	6,090	6,253	5,349	5,102	5,148

Notes

- Populations are based upon published estimates by the United States Bureau of the Census.

=== Combined statistical area ===
Geographic Area	2020 Census	2010 Census	2000 Census	1990 Census
Louisville/Jefferson County–Elizabethtown–Madison, Kentucky–Indiana CSA (Note: Named Louisville–Elizabethtown–Scottsburg, KY-IN CSA from 2000 to 2003, and Louisville/Jefferson County–Elizabethtown–Scottsburg, KY-IN CSA from 2003 to 2013.)	1,601,309	1,451,564	1,292,482	1,177,883 (Note: Census defined area did not exist during this Census. Population totals are for counties included in 2000 Census MSA or CSA estimates. Population is shown for comparison purposes only and should not be used as a reference.)
Louisville/Jefferson County, Kentucky–Indiana, MSA	1,395,855	1,307,647	1,161,975	952,662
Clark County, Indiana	121,093	110,232	96,472	87,777
Floyd County, Indiana	80,484	74,478	70,823	64,404
Harrison County, Indiana	39,654	39,364	34,325	29,890
Washington County, Indiana	28,182	28,262	27,223	23,717 (Note: County was not a part of Louisville, KY-IN MSA at the time of this Census and the county's population is not included in MSA total.)
Bullitt County, Kentucky	82,217	74,319	61,236	47,567
Henry County, Kentucky	15,678	15,416	15,060	12,823
Jefferson County, Kentucky	782,969	741,096	693,604	664,937
Meade County, Kentucky	30,003	28,602	26,349	24,170
Oldham County, Kentucky	67,607	60,316	46,178	33,263
Shelby County, Kentucky	48,065	42,074	33,337	24,824
Spencer County, Kentucky	19,490	17,061	11,766	6,801
Trimble County, Kentucky	8,474	8,809	8,125	6,090
Elizabethtown–Fort Knox, KY MSA (Note: Named Elizabethtown, KY MSA from 2000 to 2013.)	125,569	119,736	107,547	100,919
Hardin County, Kentucky	110,702	105,543	94,174	89,240
LaRue County, Kentucky	14,867	14,193	13,373	11,679
Bardstown, KY μSA	46,738	43,437	37,477	29,710
Nelson County, Kentucky	46,738	43,437 (Note: This county was part of the Louisville MSA in the 2000 and 2010 Censuses, but has since been spun off into its own statistical area. Its population is included in the MSA total for those censuses only.)	37,477	29,710
Madison, IN μSA	33,147	32,458	32,428	32,000
Jefferson County, Indiana	33,147	32,458	32,428	32,000

Notes

- Populations are based upon published estimates by the United States Bureau of the Census.

== See also ==
- Geography of Louisville, Kentucky
- Table of United States Combined Statistical Areas
