= WEHT =

Television station in Evansville, Indiana

- Evansville, Indiana; Henderson–Owensboro, Kentucky; United States
- City: Evansville, Indiana
- Channels: Digital: 12 (VHF); Virtual: 25
- Branding: ABC 25; Eyewitness News

Programming
- Affiliations: 25.1: ABC; for others, see § Subchannels

Ownership
- Owner: Nexstar Media Group; (Nexstar Media Inc.)
- Sister stations: WTVW

History
- First air date: September 27, 1953
- Former channel numbers: Analog: 50 (UHF, 1953–1964), 25 (UHF, 1964–2009); Digital: 59 (UHF, 2002–2009), 7 (VHF, 2009–2020)
- Former affiliations: CBS (1953–1995); ABC (secondary, 1953–1956)
- Call sign meaning: "Watch Evansville–Henderson Television"

Technical information
- Licensing authority: FCC
- Facility ID: 24215
- ERP: 14 kW
- HAAT: 314.7 m (1,032 ft)
- Transmitter coordinates: 37°51′57″N 87°34′4″W

Links
- Public license information: Public file; LMS
- Website: www.tristatehomepage.com

WEHT (channel 25) is a television station in Evansville, Indiana, United States, affiliated with ABC. It is owned by Nexstar Media Group and operated alongside CW outlet WTVW (channel 7). The two stations share studios on Marywood Drive in Henderson, Kentucky, where WEHT's transmitter is also located.

== History ==
The station signed on September 27, 1953, as the first television station in the Tri-State area. It aired an analog signal on UHF channel 50 and was a primary CBS affiliate with a secondary affiliation with ABC. Although the station was licensed to Evansville, the studios have always been located across the Ohio River in Henderson, which made the station the first UHF station to broadcast in Kentucky. Then-Henderson mayor Hecht Lackey was the station's first general manager. WEHT was originally owned by the Malco Theater Corporation of Memphis, Tennessee; minority interest was held by several Henderson businessmen for the first year. It would drop ABC when WTVW (channel 7) launched in August 1956. Cincinnati meatpacker Henry S. Hilberg bought the station from Malco in 1957.

The Gilmore Broadcasting Corporation, owned by former Kalamazoo, Michigan, mayor and businessman James Gilmore Jr., bought WEHT and sister station KGUN in Tucson, Arizona, from Hilberg in 1964. In September 1966, the station activated its current 988-foot (301 m) tower. On the same day the new tower came into service, it moved to the stronger channel 25. The move allowed WEHT to boast of reaching an additional 70,000 families in the area, with improved picture quality for its total audience of 250,000 households.

In mid-1995, WTVW was sold to Petracom Broadcasting, and as part of the deal, that station announced it was switching its affiliation from ABC to Fox. The result brought about a network scramble in Evansville with WEHT quickly joining ABC and WEVV-TV (channel 44, the original Fox affiliate) switching to CBS. The final switch for all three stations was made on December 3, 1995, although some programming was swapped between the stations prior to the date of the actual change.

Logo used from 2011 to 2019, under the WEHT Local branding.

WEHT was the last station owned by Gilmore Broadcasting, which has been in the hands of James Gilmore, Jr.'s family since his death in a 2000 auto accident. At its height, Gilmore owned five television stations, nine radio stations and nineteen cable television systems in nine states. Among WEHT's former sisters were WSVA-AM-FM-TV in Harrisonburg, Virginia, KODE-AM-TV in Joplin, Missouri, and WREX-TV in Rockford, Illinois. On August 8, 2011, Gilmore announced it would sell WEHT to Nexstar Broadcasting Group, the owner of WTVW (which had lost its affiliation with Fox to a digital subchannel of WEVV-TV one month earlier). As part of the deal, WTVW would be sold to Mission Broadcasting, with WEHT taking over its operations as the senior partner through shared services and joint sales agreements. The Nexstar acquisition of WEHT reunited it with KODE-TV, which is owned by Mission Broadcasting and managed by Nexstar. The transaction, which received Federal Communications Commission (FCC) approval on October 12, was completed on December 1, 2011; at that point, the station rebranded from News 25 to WEHT Local.

On April 24, 2013, Communications Corporation of America (owner of WEVV) announced the sale of its entire group to Nexstar. Since there are fewer than eight full-power stations in the Evansville market, Nexstar and its partner company Mission, cannot legally buy WEVV. So WEVV was to be sold to a female-controlled company called Rocky Creek Communications. Nexstar would have operated the station under a shared services agreement, forming a virtual triopoly with sister stations WEHT and WTVW. However, on August 4, 2014, Nexstar Broadcasting Group announced that it would instead sell WEVV to Bayou City Broadcasting for $18.6 million. The sale was completed on January 1, 2015.

On June 15, 2016, Nexstar announced that it has entered into an affiliation agreement with Katz Broadcasting for the Escape, Laff, Grit, and Bounce TV networks (the last one of which is owned by Bounce Media LLC, whose COO Jonathan Katz is president/CEO of Katz Broadcasting), bringing one or more of the four networks to 81 stations owned and/or operated by Nexstar, including WEHT and WTVW. (WTVW already carries Bounce TV on its DT2 subchannel, and Grit is already available in Evansville on WFIE-DT3.)

== News operation ==
The station currently carries 24 1/2 hours of local newscasts per week (with 4 1/2 hours each weekday and one hour each on Saturdays and Sundays); unlike most ABC affiliates, WEHT does not broadcast an early evening newscast on Sundays, and it has also not aired a midday newscast during the week since dropping a half-hour 11:30 a.m. newscast in 2007. In addition to its main studios, WEHT also operates a news bureau in Owensboro. The station operates its own Doppler weather radar across the street from its Henderson facility.

In the early-2000s through a news share agreement, WEHT produced the market's second prime time newscast at 9 on then-WB affiliate WAZE-TV (owned by Roberts Broadcasting). The broadcast was eventually canceled due to low ratings and inconsistent viewership being unable to compete with then-Fox affiliate WTVW. It was the first station to enter into the afternoon local news race on September 10 of that year after debuting a thirty-minute broadcast at 4:30. Three years later in the same month, this would be expanded to a full hour. WEHT began having its first competitor in the time slot on September 12, 2011, when WFIE debuted a 4 p.m. newscast.

Originally, WEHT-DT2 simulcast live news from the main channel in addition to offering repeats of those shows as well as local weather. This programming was dropped with the addition of RTV. The service would bring back a prime time broadcast at 9 on June 10, 2009. Soon after in September, WFIE introduced its own newscast in the time slot (on its own second digital subchannel) offering a third alternative of late news an hour earlier. With the decision to switch WEHT-DT2 to a sports channel in July 2010, the 9 o'clock broadcast was canceled.

In April 2009, the station's weekday morning news anchors started voicing updates for several Townsquare Media-owned radio stations. The stations also air weather updates from Eyewitness News meteorologists as part of the "First Warning Doppler Radio Network" and will simulcast the television station's audio feed whenever severe weather necessitates wall-to-wall coverage. The Townsquare Media stations include WKDQ-FM, WGBF-FM, WJLT-FM, WDKS-FM, WGBF-AM, WBKR-FM, and WOMI-AM. In addition to the Townsquare stations, WRAY-FM and WBNL-AM, which are owned by local companies, are also part of the radio network.

Pending approval of the sale to Nexstar, WEHT and WTVW would have their operations merged and be based in the WEHT facility in Henderson; all personnel of WEHT would then have to re-apply for their current positions starting in late September 2011. On November 7, 2011, Nexstar announced the layoff of 45 staffers effective November 30; news staffers laid off include weekday morning anchor Whitney Ray, sports director Mark McVicar, sports reporters Aaron Hancock and Sean Clark-Weis, and reporter Nick LaGrange. In addition, WTVW no longer airs newscasts in timeslots in which WEHT offers newscasts (5–7 a.m. on weekday mornings and 6–6:30 p.m. Monday-Saturdays); on December 1, 2011, the two stations' combined news operation debuted as Eyewitness News, the title WTVW had used from 1974 until its 1995 switch from ABC to Fox.

As a result of the consolidation of WTVW and WEHT's news operations, this left the Evansville market with only two local news operations amongst three stations, the other belonging to NBC affiliate WFIE (CBS affiliate WEVV-TV, which began running newscasts starting in 1992, had shut down its news operation in 2001, only to relaunch it in 2015). On August 13, 2012, WEHT began broadcasting its local newscasts in high definition, with a new news set, HD cameras and forecasting equipment. With the upgrade, the newscasts on WTVW are also broadcast in high definition.

=== Notable former on-air staff ===
- Nischelle Turner
- Bill Weber
- Lloyd Winnecke

== Technical information ==
=== Subchannels ===
The station's signal is multiplexed:

Subchannels of WEHT
Subchannel	Res.	Short name	Programming
25.1	720p	WEHT-HD	ABC
25.2	480i	Laff	Laff
25.3	480i	Cozi	Cozi TV
25.4	480i	Oxygen	Oxygen

=== Analog-to-digital conversion ===
WEHT began broadcasting a digital signal on channel 59 in 2002. The station ended regular programming on its analog signal, over UHF channel 25, on June 12, 2009, the official date on which full-power television stations in the United States transitioned from analog to digital broadcasts under federal mandate. The station's digital signal relocated from its pre-transition UHF channel 59, which was among the high band UHF channels (52–69) that were removed from broadcasting use as a result of the transition, to VHF channel 7 (used by WTVW for its analog operations), using virtual channel 25.

On August 25, 2008, the station began airing programming from Retro Television Network (RTV) on its second digital subchannel. This lasted until July 31, 2010, when WEHT-DT2 became the third affiliate of the Wazoo Sports Network which launched in late 2009 on WHAS-TV in Louisville and WLEX in Lexington. WEHT-DT2 branded it locally as the "News 25 Sports Channel" and the service had digital cable carriage. The regional sports television network was dedicated to carrying live coverage of sporting events as well as classic coverage of past high school and college events. There were also locally produced shows, the first being After Further Review, a sports talk show which aired each weeknight at 9 p.m. Central (10 p.m. Eastern). Following Nexstar's purchase of WEHT, the Sports Channel was taken off the air at approximately 12:30 a.m. CDT on December 1, 2011; at the time, Nexstar carried subchannels only when a netlet subchannel was required in a market. This eventually hastened Wazoo's demise, as the network's other affiliates ended carriage of it by December 31 and the network declared bankruptcy days later.
