= WBKR =

Country music radio station in Owensboro, Kentucky, United States

- Owensboro, Kentucky; United States
- Broadcast area: Owensboro metropolitan area; Evansville, Indiana
- Frequency: 92.5 MHz
- Branding: 92.5 WBKR

Programming
- Format: Country
- Affiliations: Compass Media Networks; Performance Racing Network

Ownership
- Owner: Townsquare Media; (Townsquare Media of Evansville/Owensboro, Inc.)
- Sister stations: WDKS; WGBF; WGBF-FM; WJLT; WKDQ; WOMI

History
- First air date: 1948
- Former call signs: WOMI-FM (1948–1975)
- Call sign meaning: "Big Kountry Radio"

Technical information
- Facility ID: 67778
- Class: C
- ERP: 95,000 watts; 100,000 with beam tilt
- HAAT: 320 meters (1,050 ft)
- Transmitter coordinates: 37.608°N 87.054°W

Links
- Webcast: Listen live
- Website: www.wbkr.com

WBKR (92.5 FM) is an American radio station broadcasting a country music format. The station is licensed to Owensboro, Kentucky. Its powerful 100,000-watt signal covers much of northwest Kentucky and southwest Indiana, including the Evansville metropolitan area. The station is owned by Townsquare Media. The station transmits from a tower located near Utica on Kentucky Route 140. The studios are located at 3301 Frederica Street in Owensboro.

== History ==
In November 1945, the Federal Communications Commission issued a construction permit to the Hager family, who were also the owners of WOMI (1490 AM) and the Owensboro Messenger-Inquirer daily newspaper, for an FM radio station in Owensboro, Kentucky. The permit was filed under licensee Owensboro Broadcasting Company. It originally intended to broadcast at 92.3 MHz, but in 1947, the construction permit was modified to allow the station to instead broadcast at 92.5 MHz. The station began operations in 1948 under special temporary authority as WOMI-FM, simulcasting WOMI AM on a 425-foot (130 m) tower with 60,000 watts of power. Its first official license was granted on April 15, 1949.

WOMI-FM continued to simulcast the AM station until 1975, when the station's call sign was changed to WBKR and it became a separate operation with an automated country music format. Through the ensuing years, little by little, it gradually moved away from automation with a live morning show, and eventually an afternoon show. By 1989, the station began operating with live deejays 24-hours-a-day. WBKR was capturing about 33% of Owensboro's radio audience by the early 1990s.

Both WOMI and WBKR remained in the hands of the heirs of the Hager family, the original owners, until 1993, when both stations were sold to Evansville, Indiana–based Brill Media. Brill Media operated WOMI and WBKR and also bought the cross-town competition and longtime rival stations, WVJS and WSTO three years later. Brill Media declared bankruptcy in 2002, and the stations were placed in the hands of a chapter 11 bankruptcy trustee who sold them. WOMI and WBKR were acquired by Regent Broadcasting Corporation of Covington, Kentucky, the forerunner of Townsquare Media. WSTO was purchased by South Central Communications Corporation of Evansville, which also operated WIKY-FM; that company would eventually relocate WSTO's studio operations to Evansville. WVJS was purchased by the Cromwell Group, Inc., of Nashville, Tennessee, which also operated Philpot-licensed WBIO.

== Programming and format ==
In addition to its country music format, WBKR is the Owensboro-area home to the Performance Racing Network, as well as the UK Sports Radio Network broadcasts of Kentucky Wildcats football and men's basketball games.

The WBKR morning team of Chad Benefield and Angel Welsh is known as The Morning Drive on 92-5. One of the former hosts, Moon Mullins, died in 2017, and was an inductee of the Country Radio Hall of Fame.

=== Special broadcasts ===
WBKR is known for its annual Telephone Pioneers Christmas Wish. This program involves monetary donations to needy families (who might not otherwise have much of a Christmas), and listeners can participate in a program where they pick a family to buy Christmas presents for.
