= WJWA =

Coordinates: 37.973°N 87.530°W

- Evansville, Indiana; United States
- Frequency: 91.5 MHz (HD Radio)
- Branding: WAY-FM

Programming
- Format: Christian adult contemporary
- Subchannels: HD2: Spanish Christian adult contemporary HD3: Christian preaching

Ownership
- Owner: WAY-FM Network; (Hope Media Group)

History
- Former call signs: WEVC (1951–1977); WUEV (1977–2019)
- Call sign meaning: "Way" (branding)

Technical information
- Facility ID: 69106
- Class: B1
- ERP: 6,100 watts
- HAAT: 46 meters (151 ft)
- Translators: HD2: 100.1 W261CW (Evansville); HD3: 91.9 W220DV (Evansville)

Links
- Webcast: Listen Live (HD3)
- Website: wayfm.com/evansville vidaunida.com (HD2) pureradio.org (HD3)

WJWA (91.5 FM) is a radio station in Evansville, Indiana. It is a noncommercial station owned and operated by Hope Media Group, broadcasting their WAY-FM Network programming. The station was previously 91.5 WUEV, known as the “Students’ Radio Station” and also “Evansville’s Radio Station”, which the University of Evansville sold in a controversial decision protested by students, alumni, and community in 2018–2019.

== History ==
Occupying Room 301 in Olmsted Administration Building for its entire run, WJWA was first known as WEVC when it was built in 1950. Before that time, Evansville College maintained a radio broadcasting program through an agreement with 1280 WGBF, a local radio station. On March 31, 1951, WEVC went onto the air for the first time at 10 watts, monaural, at 91.5 MHz. It ran programming two hours a day, five days a week. By 1975, stereo equipment was purchased by a benefit held at Mesker Amphitheatre in Evansville featuring Ted Nugent.

On January 1, 1977, WEVC became WUEV to reflect the new University of Evansville name (The Buzzard (aka) "Skipper T." Spence, along with, then, director; Dr. Gil Clardy announced the change at midnight). By 1984, WUEV had increased power from 3000 to 6100 watts and was renovated in 1988. Programming shifted over the years to reflect a more progressive format, and the station continued to serve the needs of the Evansville community and UE students.

Through the help of an Ameritech Innovations grant in the winter of 1996, Len Clark and Phil Bailey, then the General Manager and Chief Engineer at WUEV respectively, established the Internet Center at WUEV to stream the terrestrial signal heard in Evansville to the world. A Xing Streamworks encoder and server were procured and installed, and the audio lines from the control studio were run into a little-used back corner of the WUEV newsroom. WUEV simulcasted for the first time on January 16, 1996.

On July 30, 1997, WUEV opened the Harlaxton Bureau at Harlaxton College, Lincolnshire, England. Shortly thereafter, Harlaxton Bureau correspondents covered the death of Princess Diana and were subsequently recognized by the Indiana Society of Professional Journalists.

The bureau also made the University of Evansville the first American university project with a student-run news bureau on a foreign campus.

By the fall of 1998, WUEV had purchased and installed additional streaming equipment and started research into branding and educational uses for streaming media technology. On hand in the fall of 1998 were:

- A Windows NT server, "RealAudio", to encode and stream the RealAudio stream.
- A Windows NT server, "Xing", formerly used for the Streamworks encoding, then used to stream the Microsoft Netshow (now Windows Media Technologies) stream.
- A Telos Audioactive encoder for the Microsoft stream.
- An Oak server loaded with UNIX for serving the Xing Streamworks stream, used for dead storage and experimentation with Linux/UNIX streaming protocols.
- A DR-10 telephone switcher used for switching audio signals.
- Various compression, limiting, and gating terminals.

The Internet gave WUEV great opportunities to share many things to the world. WUEV carried the World Radio Network signal from WRN-1, North America, during the early morning hours and into the early afternoon. Before the noon news, the station operator at the time would spool up one of several pre-recorded syndicated shows. After the noon news, on-air talent would take over until 1 or 2 a.m., when the station operator would switch back to WRN-1. Thus, anyone listening to WUEV in the late 1990s could hear anything from progressive rock to metal, from jazz to hip-hop, news to sports, anywhere in the world.

Before the launch of the Internet Center, the only source for University of Evansville Men's basketball coverage was local sources inside Evansville, particularly Adam Alexander on WKDQ. Evansville basketball was not broadcast anywhere outside of the area. WUEV did not air UE basketball through their terrestrial signal at that time, either. But, they could carry basketball on the internet. A DR-10 telephone switcher was purchased and wired into the Internet Center by Bailey, so that Clark and the field broadcast team could call the UE toll-free number, reach the proper extension, and switch the internet broadcast signal from the control room's input line to a Marti or Comdex input line. Listeners could now "tune in" to the internet broadcast. When the game was over, someone would call back and switch the signal back to the terrestrial feed.

With WUEV's new foray into the world of internet radio, Clark made a key partnership with the Missouri Valley Conference to offer a sports broadcasting workshop in conjunction with the annual conference Men's Basketball Tournament in St. Louis, Missouri. Students from the MVC schools would do the play-by-play and color while their teams were on the floor at the tournament.

At the same time, WUEV engineers investigated new ways of bringing the experience to the Internet listener. Webcams were purchased and taken to every home basketball game. It was little more than a half-court shot of the action due to the bandwidth, but it was progress towards something new. A Diamond Rio MP3 player was purchased and taken to every remote broadcast, and once the signal was switched from terrestrial to remote feed, Clark or the field engineer would run the commercial breaks live in the field. It became possible to run an entire broadcast from the field without the assistance of the control booth or the station.

Roughly around the spring of 2000, WUEV began to experiment with the Icecast streaming technology for the terrestrial signal by using a testbed of MP3 songs on the local server. As early as 1999, student producers at the station were using MP3 encoded songs during live sessions in the on-air studio, and attempts were made to create playlists using MusicMatch and a computer for automation. However, much was not known about the technology and hardware constraints severely limited automation until the new automation system was installed.

According to the WUEV website, broadcast facilities were upgraded from analog to digital in 2003. A full automation system was installed, and more sports broadcast equipment was purchased. By 2004, WUEV had fully moved into offering Shoutcast streaming capability and had adopted a Dell rack mount system.

WUEV was in jeopardy early in 2006 when the University of Evansville administration were recipients of an offer to buy out the station by an undisclosed bidder. The receipt of the offer was announced on 31 January 2006 in AceNotes (the university's daily email to its students, staff, faculty and other members of the university community) along with a request for reader input. This prompted concerned alumni and students to a major grassroots campaign to protest the sale of the station and its operating bandwidth. According to local sources, including the University Crescent, over 400 letters were received on the subject, with an overwhelming majority against the proposed sale. In fact, according to every news report, the University of Evansville never offered one letter that supported the sale nor provided an example of anyone stating they were in favor of the sale.

On 9 February 2006, President Stephen Jennings announced that the offer would be rejected, giving administration time to evaluate and change the way that WUEV has been managed on campus. After an unspecified time, the station would be re-evaluated for viability and options would again be considered.

In January 2009, WUEV moved from its original location in Olmsted 301 to a new home on the second floor in the new Ridgway University Center. The new station included a much larger productions studio, storage, and "The Fishbowl", the DJ booth with a large window for passers-by to view the inside of the studio. With more room, the station planned on hosting more in-studio interviews and live performances.

The station's musical format was dayparted. Overnights and daytime hours were devoted to jazz, branded as "JazzFlight." In the early evenings, current pop music was played. Later, the station went to rock or dance. On Saturdays, WUEV aired blues, and Sundays it ran Christian music. UE students program much of the broadcast day.

== Sale of WUEV to WAY-FM ==
On May 17, 2019, the University of Evansville made what members of the Evansville community claimed to be a controversial decision to sell the students' station to WAY-FM, a non-profit nationwide network that plays contemporary Christian music.

The issue was brought to light in September 2018 when a group of University of Evansville alumni, community, and students began to uncover information that the University of Evansville previously had kept from the public as reported by WEHT News 25.

While it seemed to the University of Evansville and Vice President for Enrollment & Marketing Dr. Shane Davidson continued to deny that a potential sale was being strongly considered in 2018, the university later admitted in 2019 the decision was made over a two-year study since 2016 which they previously never mentioned.

UE President Chris M. Pietruszkiewicz was said to have refused to meet with UE students who objected to the sale. This was an accusation made and observed publicly a number of times and never refuted by the President nor University.

The community of Evansville and WUEV supporters rallied behind keeping WUEV through protests on campus and letter writing campaign.

Students, alumni, and supporters also made a case that student DJs had been censored by the University of Evansville from speaking about the sale on the airwaves at WUEV to garner support from the community.

The University of Evansville went so far as in October 2018 to refute WUEV on-air claims of sale to the public with a press release. Earlier that fall in September 2018, an email from the University of Evansville Michael Austin was circulated email within the University of Evansville specifically saying that WUEV had already been sold. This email from Michael August was reported by both Courier & Press and InsideRadio.com.

According to a report from NPR, Tamara Wandel, a journalism professor at the University of Evansville, criticized the decision to sell WUEV, stating that it was made without input from the university's radio and television department.

Transparency and communication with students, staff, and faculty were highly criticized on the WUEV issue. "The sale of WUEV to Way-FM was not done with transparency or proper communication with students, staff, or faculty. The decision was made without input from the radio and television department," Tristan Richard, senior and general manager of WUEV told NPR.

Inside Higher Ed, the Washington, D.C.–based publisher covering higher education stories, reported that the proposed sale of WUEV would negatively impact the university's media and communications programs and reduce opportunities for hands-on learning.

Christopher M. Pietruszkiewicz, the president of the University of Evansville, told The New York Times in a February 25, 2019 article that he believed that U.E. could do without owning a radio station.

The FCC finalized the transfer of WUEV's license to WAY-FM on November 25, 2019. The terrestrial signal went silent at 11 p.m. CST. The final song played on WUEV was "Closing Time" by Semisonic. The station began broadcasting WAY-FM programming on November 26, 2019, and changed its call sign to WJWA on December 4, 2019.

Supporters of WUEV brought forth arguments that the University of Evansville had not followed proper FCC procedure with regard to the sale.

== Notable WUEV alumni and staff ==
- Len Clark, who was the General Manager for roughly ten years. Len was named the 2001 Indiana Sportscaster of the Year by the National Sportscasters and Sportswriters Association, and won the Powerade Sports Broadcast Package of the Year, that same year, for his package on the Notre Dame-USC Football Rivalry. He was also a named a Sagamore of the Wabash.
- Tom Fischer of Tripodder.com and several other Evansville media outlets is a WUEV alumnus. Tom's coverage of the 2006 buyout offer on Tripodder was the most substantial, helping those alumni outside of the Evansville area keep up to date with the status of the station.
- Rick Daniels, who was a non-student teamed up with UE grad Rachael Chambliss to start the Rick and Rachael show on the "Today's Best Music" format on WUEV. It won the NSBA show of the year in 2003. Rick went on to work at several radio stations (WLBC-FM, WSTO, WQXQ, WXXC, WKDQ, WSCH & others), and is current at KIZN in Boise, ID. Rachael went on to work for WFIE-TV in Evansville, IN and currently is a reporter for a FOX affiliate in Florida.
- Lou Pickney, former Sports Director, was producing the "Bubba The Love Sponge" Show in Tampa, FL, before going to work for a family business. Lou led the "Baseball Sounds Better on the FM Dial" promotion during the time when WGBF-AM was competing for the radio rights for Aces Baseball. Lou also worked the Harlaxton Bureau for a semester.
- Jim Zekis, Matt Woodruff, and Mike Selby continue their shenanigans from "The Other Side", WUEV's metal show, under the name Attention Deficit Theater, a radio sketch comedy routine heard on independent Internet sources.

Djuan Lambert (JuanStarr of Partylights, now Juan Hustle) got his start in radio while interning under Partylighs director Brian Smith. Djuan has gone on to work in various markets around the United States as a radio personality.

== Previous logo ==
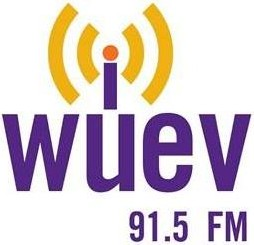
