= WGBF =

WGBF may refer to:

- WGBF-FM, a radio station (103.1 FM) licensed to Henderson, Kentucky, United States
- WGBF (AM), a radio station (1280 AM) licensed to Evansville, Indiana, United States
