= South Central Communications =

South Central Communications, d.b.a. South Central Incorporated, is a privately owned company based in Evansville, Indiana. It is owned and operated by the Engelbrecht family, which includes John D. Engelbrecht (President and CEO), JP Engelbrecht (VP & COO), and Bettie G. Engelbrecht (Director Emeritus).

== History ==
It was announced on May 28, 2014, that Midwest Communications was to purchase nine of the ten stations owned by South Central Communications. With this purchase, Midwest Communications expanded its portfolio of stations to Evansville, Knoxville and Nashville. WEJK, which was owned by Boonville Broadcasting and operated by South Central Communications, was not involved in the sale as it would not fit under the ownership cap for Midwest. It was grandfathered in for South Central under previous ownership rules. It was stated at the time that it was likely that Boonville Broadcasting would take back operations of WEJK before or after the sale of South Central Communications other stations were finalized. It was then announced on August 18, 2014, that South Central Communications will be turning the operations of WEJK over to The Original Company, as Boonville Broadcasting will continue to own the station. Once approved by the FCC, The Original Company will take over the operations of WEJK and would operate the station via a time brokerage agreement. The changeover was completed on September 1. The sale of the nine former South Central Communications radio stations to Midwest Communications were also finalized on September 1.

== Current station ==
Media market	Station	Channel	Owned since	Network affiliation
Louisville, Kentucky	WBNM-LD	50	(Note: Owned by Evangel World Prayer Center of Kentucky and operated by South Central.)	Buzzr

== Former stations ==
Media market	State	Station	Purchased	Sold	Notes
Evansville	Indiana	WABX	—N/a	2014	
Evansville	Indiana	WAZE-TV	1997	2006	(Note: Known as WWAZ-TV prior to 2000.)
Evansville	Indiana	WAZE-LP	1998	2006	(Note: Known as WWAZ-LP prior to 2000.) (Note: Satellite of WAZE-TV.)
Evansville	Indiana	WEJK	—N/a	2014	
Evansville	Indiana	WEOA	1981	2009	
Evansville	Indiana	WIKY	1946	1981	
Evansville	Indiana	WIKY-FM	1948	2014	
Evansville	Indiana	WIKY-LP	1998	2006	
Evansville	Indiana	WJPS-LP	1998	2006	
Evansville	Indiana	WLFW	—N/a	2014	
Evansville	Indiana	WSTO	2002	2014	
Knoxville	Tennessee	WDKW	1999	2014	
Knoxville	Tennessee	WIMZ-FM	—N/a	2014	
Knoxville	Tennessee	WJXB-FM	—N/a	2014	
Knoxville	Tennessee	WKXT-TV	1988	1992	
Knoxville	Tennessee	WLYT	—N/a	2014	
Knoxville	Tennessee	WMAK-TV	2004	2009	
Knoxville	Tennessee	WNFZ	—N/a	2014	
Knoxville	Tennessee	WTVK-TV	1954	1988	
Nashville	Tennessee	WCJK	—N/a	2014	
Nashville	Tennessee	WGAP-LP	1998	2006	
Nashville	Tennessee	WJDE-LD	1986	2012	
Nashville	Tennessee	WJXA	—N/a	2014	
Nashville	Tennessee	WRMX-LP	1988	2013	

=== Other ===
- South Central owned a full-service digital advertising and marketing agency headquartered in Nashville, Tennessee and operated throughout the U.S. under the South Central Digital Banner until 2016, when South Central sold it and the agency was renamed 16DIGITAL.
