= WOMI =

Radio station in Owensboro, Kentucky

- Owensboro, Kentucky; United States
- Broadcast area: Owensboro metropolitan area; Evansville, Indiana
- Frequency: 1490 kHz
- Branding: Newstalk 1490

Programming
- Format: News-talk
- Affiliations: Fox News Radio; NBC News Radio; Compass Media Networks; Genesis Communications Network; Premiere Networks; USA Radio Network; Westwood One

Ownership
- Owner: Townsquare Media; (Townsquare Media of Evansville/Owensboro, Inc.)
- Sister stations: WBKR; WDKS; WGBF; WGBF-FM; WJLT; WKDQ

History
- First air date: February 7, 1938
- Former frequencies: 1500 kHz (1938–1941)
- Call sign meaning: Owensboro Messenger-Inquirer

Technical information
- Licensing authority: FCC
- Facility ID: 67777
- Class: C
- Power: 830 watts unlimited
- Transmitter coordinates: 37°44′29″N 87°6′58″W
- Translator: 99.1 W256CF (Owensboro)

Links
- Public license information: Public file; LMS
- Webcast: Listen live
- Website: womiowensboro.com

WOMI (1490 AM) is a radio station broadcasting a news-talk format. Licensed to Owensboro, Kentucky, United States, the station serves the Owensboro metropolitan area. The station is owned by Townsquare Media and features programming from Fox News Radio, NBC News Radio, Compass Media Networks, Genesis Communications Network, Premiere Networks, USA Radio Network, and Westwood One.

== History ==
WOMI made its debut at 7:00 pm on the evening of Monday, February 7, 1938, becoming the seventh radio station in the state of Kentucky, with a live celebratory broadcast from the Hotel Owensboro. The station began with 250 watts of daytime power and 100 watts at night at 1500 kilohertz. Owensboro Messenger-Inquirer publisher Lawrence Hager formed Owensboro Broadcasting Company as owner and operator of the station. A modern two-story art deco building had been constructed on Frederica Street, just south of Byers Avenue, to house the new broadcast operation. Lyell Ludwig was hired as WOMI's first general manager, but Hager replaced Ludwig in 1939, with the newspaper's city editor Hugh Potter. Potter's wife, Cliffordean, became the station's program director and the couple moved into the station's second floor apartment where they remained until their retirement in 1972.

On March 29, 1941, WOMI moved to 1490 kilohertz as part of the North American Regional Broadcasting Agreement which reallocated frequencies for some 1,300 AM stations. WOMI had no network affiliation until it joined the Mutual Broadcasting System in 1944, just in time for the network's coverage of the D-Day Normandy invasion of World War II. WOMI stayed with Mutual until 1959, when the station became a CBS Radio Network affiliate.

WOMI had primarily been a full-service station during the Potter years of 1939 to 1972. The station experimented with various formats following the departure of the Potters. The station's post-Potter banner years were the mid-to-late 1970s when a well-executed Top 40 format drew big audience numbers for the station. WOMI joined NBC Radio in 1979, and then, it joined that network's "TalkNet" in 1985, and soon found its niche as the city's news-talk outlet.

In 1993, the station was sold to Evansville, Indiana-based Brill Broadcasting. In 2002, the station was sold to Regent Communications, the forerunner of Townsquare Media.
