= WJLT =

- Evansville, Indiana; United States
- Frequency: 105.3 MHz
- Branding: My 105.3

Programming
- Format: Adult contemporary

Ownership
- Owner: Townsquare Media; (Townsquare Media of Evansville/Owensboro, Inc.)
- Sister stations: WDKS, WGBF, WGBF-FM, WKDQ

History
- First air date: December 22, 1964
- Former call signs: WVHI-FM (1964–1982); WYNG (1982–2003)

Technical information
- Licensing authority: FCC
- Facility ID: 36946
- Class: B
- ERP: 50,000 watts
- HAAT: 150 meters
- Transmitter coordinates: 38.079°N 87.610°W

Links
- Public license information: Public file; LMS
- Webcast: Listen Live
- Website: my1053wjlt.com

WJLT (105.3 FM, "My 105.3") is a radio station in Evansville, Indiana, United States. Owned by Townsquare Media, it broadcasts an adult contemporary format.

== History ==
The station started as WVHI-FM on December 22, 1964, a religious station.

In 1982, the owners decided to compete with WBKR and changed to a country music format. The station became WYNG (Wing 105).

WYNG was successful through the 1980s, but then things began to sour. The first blow came when WBKR started to target Evansville, IN a little more (it was primarily targeting Owensboro, Kentucky, but had a 100 kW signal that was received in Evansville). The second blow came in 1992 when WKDQ dumped its Adult Contemporary/Oldies hybrid format in favor of country, immediately taking numbers from WYNG. A third blow came when, in a desperate move, WYNG dumped its Wing 105 moniker and started calling itself Y105 and trying to target younger listeners.

WYNG was later acquired by Cumulus Media (along with WGBF-FM/AM, WDKS, and WTRI) and later spun to Clear Channel Communications (now known as iHeartMedia). Clear Channel elected to move WYNG to the 94.9 frequency which was a 50 kW facility, but the transmitter was further north in Mount Carmel, Illinois, and ratings plummeted. Eventually the 94.9 frequency was sold to W. Russ Withers Jr.

Meanwhile, Clear Channel decided to compete with Evansville's adult contemporary powerhouse and consistent ratings leader WIKY-FM. With a callsign change to WJLT, Lite 105.3 took to the air, but the ratings plummeted for 105.3 in the new AC format. When Clear Channel spun off its Evansville cluster to Regent Communications (now Townsquare Media), Regent flipped WJLT to oldies.

WJLT saw much success with that format, with respectable ratings among the top five or six stations in Evansville.

A large part of that success was credited by listeners to the fact that Regent was able to lure Joe Blair, a popular local morning DJ who had previously built up a loyal audience at WIKY and later at WJPS-FM (now WLYD, to take on the station's morning show.

As an oldies station, WJLT branded itself as "Superhits 105.3" and aired numerous television commercials. The station also simulcasted audio of local television station WEHT when severe weather was in the area and WEHT carried wall-to-wall weather coverage.

=== ESPN Evansville ===
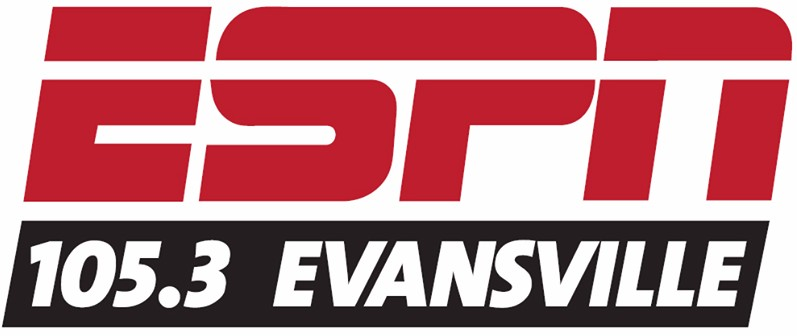
Logo as ESPN Evansville, 2014-16

On May 27, 2014, WJLT announced it would flip to sports talk on July 9; with the announcement, WJLT would release their entire airstaff, running jockless until the flip took place. WJLT took the ESPN Radio affiliation, then heard on rimshot WYFX, with the change. The change took place at 3PM that day; the last song on Superhits 105.3 WJLT was "It's the End of the World as We Know It (and I Feel Fine)'" by R.E.M, and ESPN 105.3 launched with the premiere of Ford & O'Bryan, the only local show on 105.3. WJLT became an affiliate of the Chicago Cubs Radio Network starting with the 2015 season.

=== My 105.3 WJLT ===
Logo until 2017

On December 5, 2016, WJLT dropped ESPN Radio and began playing Christmas music as "My 105.3 WJLT", with a flip to adult contemporary to follow on the 26th. Under the AC format, 105.3 will go up against market powerhouse WIKY-FM.
