= WSWI =

- Evansville, Indiana; United States
- Frequency: 820 kHz
- Branding: 95.7 The Spin

Programming
- Format: Alternative rock
- Affiliations: AP Radio

Ownership
- Owner: University of Southern Indiana Board of Trustees

History
- First air date: August 3, 1947
- Former call signs: WIKY (1947–1981)
- Call sign meaning: "Southwestern Indiana"

Technical information
- Licensing authority: FCC
- Facility ID: 68924
- Class: D
- Power: 250 watts (daytime only)
- Transmitter coordinates: 37°57′53″N 87°40′6″W
- Translator: 95.7 W239CI (Evansville)
- Repeater: 90.7 WPSR-HD2 (Evansville)

Links
- Public license information: Public file; LMS
- Webcast: Listen live
- Website: 957thespin.com

WSWI (820 AM) is a non-commercial educational radio station licensed to Evansville, Indiana, United States, carrying an alternative rock format known as "95.7 The Spin". Owned by the Board of Trustees of the University of Southern Indiana (USI), the campus radio station has studios and a transmitter site located on the USI campus in Evansville. WSWI operates during the daytime hours only, thus in addition to a standard analog transmission, the station's format is broadcast continuously via a simulcast over the HD2 digital subchannel of WPSR and a relay over low-power analog translator W239CI (95.7 FM), along with being available online.

It was established in 1947 as WIKY, the first station owned by Evansville-based South Central Broadcasting. The WIKY stations were successful, broadcasting mostly easy listening music. However, as music listenership shifted to FM, in 1981 South Central opted to buy a more successful AM station and donated the 820 kHz facility to the university, which relaunched it as a student-run station serving its communications program.

== History ==
=== WIKY ===
On July 20, 1946, the South Central Broadcasting Company filed with the Federal Communications Commission (FCC) to build a new radio station on 820 kHz, with 250 watts of power to operate during daylight hours only. The FCC granted the permit on October 17. Work began in early 1947 to clear a tract of land at Mt. Auburn Road and Bismark Avenue, then outside the city limits. Further, South Central obtained a permit to set up an FM station at the same time.

WIKY began broadcasting on August 3, 1947, with a dedication ceremony, followed by regular programs the next day. It did not have a network affiliation and presented news, sports, music, and local service programs such as the "Lost and Found Column of the Air". The next year, WIKY-FM 104.1 debuted, providing full-time service to accompany the daytime-only radio station.

In the early 1950s, WIKY lobbied vigorously for a VHF television channel to be allocated to Evansville. By October 1951, not only did it have an application awaiting processing, but a TV studio was under construction at the Auburn Heights complex, and president John Englebrecht claimed that it could be on the air in six weeks if it were granted a station. At one point, as many as five applicants sought VHF channel 7, but the hearings turned into a four-way battle. However, after its attorney suffered a mental breakdown, South Central withdrew from contention in February 1954. Many of its hearing exhibits had been ruled inadmissible, and the application had already been called "ill-starred". It instead opted to expand into television elsewhere, buying WTSK-TV in Knoxville, Tennessee, in 1954.

WIKY AM and FM simulcast during daylight hours, carrying an easy listening format. However, in 1976, the FCC expanded the FM Non-Duplication Rule to cover stations in smaller markets. By this time, WIKY was also seeing listeners tune in primarily on the FM frequency. As a result, South Central began to chart a new course for the AM outlet, which was rumored to become a country music station to compete with WROZ (1400 AM). Instead, WIKY went to a format that would later be called hot adult contemporary, aimed at an 18–34 age group. By the start of the 1980s, however, the format had been dropped for a slightly more contemporary version of the FM format.

=== WSWI ===
In 1981, South Central entered into an agreement to buy WROZ from Fuqua Industries. FCC rules of the time did not permit the ownership of multiple AM or FM stations in the same market; as a result, to acquire WROZ—a station that could broadcast day and night and was a higher-performing country station—WIKY AM had to be divested. An agreement was reached with Indiana State University–Evansville (ISUE), which already had a communications major with 100 students and on-campus studios, to donate the facility to the school; ISUE had attempted for several years to obtain a permit for an FM station but faced difficulties finding a suitable frequency. To prepare to take over the station, the university had to acquire additional tape recorders, a newswire service, and equipment to connect to the transmitter at the WIKY site. South Central also donated some equipment and engineering assistance. John Englebrecht appraised the value of the station being donated at slightly under $300,000.

On November 3, 1981, South Central took over operations of WROZ, and ISUE took over the former WIKY AM with the new call sign WSWI and a format consisting of local news, classical music, and jazz. The station also aired some sports broadcasts, though its ability to broadcast basketball games was severely curtailed by its daytime-only status. (WIKY would return to the AM band in 1986 when the Non-Duplication Rule was dropped as a replacement for WROZ's country format.)

For its first year, WSWI used the WIKY AM tower site. However, in 1982, the tower collapsed, and the station was forced to use a 300-foot (91 m) improvised antenna. It had already been planned for ISUE to build its own tower within five years, and as a result of the collapse, this was accelerated, with Englebrecht loaning $300,000 to the university to finance construction of an on-campus transmitter facility; meanwhile, funds were raised from the community to build a satellite receiver to allow the station to access satellite-delivered news and music programming. The tower was erected in 1983 after the FCC granted approval to the university. In 1985, ISUE was separated from Indiana State University in Terre Haute and became the University of Southern Indiana. Beginning in 1988, USI partnered with WPSR (90.7 FM), owned by the Evansville Vanderburgh School Corporation, to permit evening broadcasts of its athletics events. In 1997, the transmitter was replaced after the 1950s unit donated by South Central broke down in a summer heat wave.

In 1999, WSWI moved to a new liberal arts center on the USI campus, and student interest increased. To provide more air time for students, two longtime specialty shows featuring classical and big band music ended their runs on the station. The station began streaming on the internet in 2002, which also enabled nighttime programming and thus coverage of more USI sporting events.

WSWI, then known as "The Edge", and WPSR deepened their partnership in 2010 when WSWI's programming debuted as an HD2 subchannel of the latter station. In 2016, an analog FM signal was added when translator W239CI was put into service, the culmination of efforts dating to the early 1990s to put WSWI on FM; the FM translator is broadcast from the WIKY tower site. As a result, all USI sports broadcasts previously on WPSR moved to WSWI, though WSWI would continue producing high school sports broadcasts for WPSR. The station then rebranded as The Spin in time for the fall semester after press coverage of the FM launch led to a trademark concern; to remain "The Edge", WSWI would have had to pay an annual fee.
