= WIKY =

WIKY may refer to:

- WIKY-FM, a radio station (104.1 FM) licensed to Evansville, Indiana, United States
- WIKY-LP, a defunct low-power television station (channel 5) licensed to Evansville, Indiana
