= WPCO =

WPCO may refer to:

- WPCO (AM), a radio station (840 AM) licensed to serve Stroudsburg, Pennsylvania, United States
- WPCO (South Carolina), a radio station (1230 AM) licensed to serve Columbia, South Carolina, United States, which held the call sign from 2018 to 2023
- WPIW, a radio station (1590 AM) licensed to serve Mount Vernon, Indiana, United States, which held the call sign WPCO from 1955 to 1999
