= Christopher M. Pietruszkiewicz =

American university president

24th President of the University of Evansville
- Incumbent
- Assumed office July 1, 2018

Dean of Stetson University College of Law
- In office 2012–2018

Christopher M. Pietruszkiewicz (/ˌpɛtrəˈskɛvɪtʃ/ PET-rəs-KEV-itch) is an American college administrator and currently the president of the University of Evansville in Evansville, Indiana. Prior to becoming president of the University of Evansville, Pietruszkiewicz served as dean of Stetson University College of Law.

== Career ==
Prior to entering academia, Pietruszkiewicz served as a trial attorney in the United States Department of Justice Tax Division from 1997 to 2001, receiving the Outstanding Attorney Award in 2000. He also served as an attorney and adviser in the United States Department of Education from 1992 to 1997, receiving the Assistant Secretary's Award for Team Distinction and the Deputy Secretary's Award for Service.

Pietruszkiewicz began his academic career at the George Mason University School of Law, where he was an adjunct professor. He joined the faculty of Louisiana State University Paul M. Hebert Law Center in 2001, and became vice chancellor for business and financial affairs in 2007.

In 2018, he was named president of the University of Evansville in Evansville, Indiana.

== Controversies occurring during Pietruszkiewicz's presidency of University of Evansville ==
On May 17, 2019, the University of Evansville made what members of the Evansville community claimed to be a controversial decision to sell the students' station WUEV to WAY-FM, a non-profit nationwide network that plays contemporary Christian music. Pietruszkiewicz was said to have refused to meet with UE students who objected to the sale.

In 2020, the faculty of the university voted "no confidence" in Pietruszkiewicz amid a study of the university's future. Later that year, during the COVID-19 pandemic, Pietruszkiewicz and the university board of trustees threatened to eliminate 3 departments and 17 majors due to proposed cuts. This was protested heavily and most majors were kept.

In 2022, the University of Evansville students protested the cancellation of the annual"Bike Race," a 60-year-old tradition. Lambda Chi Alpha President Dylan Mofield started an online petition, "Save UE Bike Race," which quickly gained over 1,500 signatures. Responding to the outcry, university officials announced that the event would indeed take place on April 9. Supporters of the online petition said the decision to actually cancel Bike Race exemplified the disconnect between the student body and the current UE administration and president. The decision to cancel the event was not made by Pietruszkiewicz, but other members of university administration.

In 2023, students at the University of Evansville held a march and protest in response to racial slurs allegedly used at an off-campus party. The Black Student Union (BSU) led the protest, seeking changes to prevent similar incidents and demanding the administration use more urgency in addressing hate crimes and racial issues. They also called for safe spaces for students of color and increased diversity training.
