= WEOA =

Radio station in Evansville, Indiana

Coordinates: 37°56′17″N 87°31′40″W

- Evansville, Indiana; United States
- Broadcast area: Evansville, Indiana
- Frequency: 1400 kHz
- Branding: 98.5 WEOA

Programming
- Format: Urban contemporary
- Affiliations: Premiere Networks

Ownership
- Owner: BLS Entertainment Inc.

History
- First air date: 1936
- Former call signs: WEOA (1936–1961); WROZ (1961–1986); WIKY (1986–1992); WJPS (1992–1997)
- Call sign meaning: "Evansville On the Air"

Technical information
- Licensing authority: FCC
- Facility ID: 61042
- Class: C
- Power: 1,000 watts
- Translators: 98.5 W253BF (Evansville); 100.7 W264DM (Evansville)

Links
- Public license information: Public file; LMS
- Webcast: Listen live
- Website: www.weoa985.com

WEOA (1400 AM) is a radio station licensed to and serving the Evansville, Indiana, market. The transmitter is located near the interchange of I-69 and Weinbach Avenue in Evansville.

== History ==
WEOA (Evansville On the Air) went on the air in 1936; it changed to WROZ in 1961. WROZ was a Top 40 station in the 1960s with top personalities such as Charlie Shoe, Jack Etzel, Mark Clark, Steve Walling, and Johnny Carr, and country music in the 1970s and 1980s with top personalities: Tiny Hughes and Jim Embry. After WROZ left, 1400 became a simulcast of WJPS-FM 93.5.

In 1997, a group of African American investors approached South Central Communications about leasing the frequency for an urban contemporary format. South Central agreed. For 10 years, WEOA would be the only urban station in the Evansville area until August 2007 when CHR/Pop WDKS shifted to urban. The local marketing agreement with BLS Entertainment lasted until 2009, when BLS bought the station outright for $175,000.

On March 19, 2018, WEOA changed its format from urban adult contemporary to urban contemporary, branded as "98.5 WEOA".
