= WPSR =

WPSR may refer to:

- Wisconsin Public Service Resources Corp, an energy company
- WPSR (FM), a non-commercial station located at 90.7 FM, licensed to service the Evansville, Indiana area
