= WJPS =

Radio station in Boonville, Indiana, US

- Boonville, Indiana; United States
- Broadcast area: Evansville, Indiana
- Frequency: 107.1 MHz
- Branding: Classic Hits 107.1

Programming
- Format: Classic hits
- Affiliations: ABC Radio

Ownership
- Owner: Mark and Saundra Lange; (The Original Company, Inc.)
- Sister stations: WMVI, WPIW

History
- First air date: 1967 (as WBNL-FM)
- Former call signs: WBNL-FM (1967–2001); WYXY (2001–2005); WEJK (2005–2014)

Technical information
- Licensing authority: FCC
- Facility ID: 6424
- Class: A
- ERP: 1,600 watts
- HAAT: 195 meters
- Transmitter coordinates: 37°59′13.00″N 87°16′11.00″W

Links
- Public license information: Public file; LMS
- Webcast: Listen Live

WJPS (107.1 FM) is an American radio station broadcasting a classic hits format. Licensed to Boonville, Indiana, United States, the station serves the Evansville area. The station is currently owned by Mark and Saundra Lange, through licensee The Original Company, Inc., and features programming from ABC Radio.

== History ==
The station went on the air as WBNL-FM on March 22, 1979. On May 15, 2001, the station changed its call sign to WYXY; on November 11, 2005, it changed to WEJK, and on October 9, 2014, it changed to the current WJPS.

From the late 1990s to the fall of 2003, the station was known as "Y 107 - Classic Hits." In November 2003, South Central Communications, the station operator switched WYXY to Christmas music. On December 26, 2003, the station became "107.1 WYXY - Today's Christian Music." This was the Salem Radio Network's format that was based out of Nashville, Tennessee, and broadcast on the FISH stations across the country. On October 7, 2005, at 12:00 PM, the station left the Contemporary Christian format and became "107.1 JACK-FM." JACK is the format that originated in Canada in 2002. It plays a shuffle of music from the 1970s, 1980s, 1990s, and a few of today's hits.

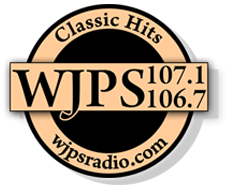
Previous Logo from WJPS-WYFX simulcast

South Central Communications would sell the station separately in 2014 from a deal it made with Midwest Communications for most of its stations, due to grandfathered sale restrictions that would not allow WEJK to be sold with its sister stations. It was first brokered to Vincennes-based The Original Company on September 1, at which time 107.1 flipped back to classic hits as Classic Hits 107.1. The station was sold to TOC on October 9, 2014, for $350,000, with its calls changing to WJPS the same day.

== History of call letters ==
The call letters WJPS were previously assigned to an AM station in Evansville. An ABC affiliate, it began broadcasting October 30, 1948, on 1330 kHz with power of 5 KW (daytime) and 1 KW (night). It was considered one of the finest "Top 40" small-market stations in the nation during the 1960s and 1970s.
