= WABX =

Radio station in Evansville, Indiana

Coordinates: 37.989°N 87.597°W

Evansville, Indiana; United States
- Broadcast area: Evansville, Indiana
- Frequency: 107.5 MHz
- Branding: WABX 107.5

Programming
- Format: Classic rock

Ownership
- Owner: Midwest Communications; (Midwest Communications, Inc.)
- Sister stations: WIKY-FM, WLYD, WSTO

History
- First air date: 1997

Technical information
- Facility ID: 61055
- Class: A
- ERP: 2,000 watts
- HAAT: 171 meters (561 ft)

Links
- Webcast: Listen Live
- Website: wabx.net

WABX (107.5 FM) is a radio station in Evansville, Indiana, owned by Midwest Communications, through licensee Midwest Communications, Inc. The station has aired a classic rock format since 1997.

== Former WABX ==
From 1960 to 1984, WABX ("The station that glows in the dark") was the call sign of a widely influential freeform/progressive rock radio station in Detroit, Michigan. In 1985, WABX's former consultant, Paul Christy, purchased WCFX/95.3 in Clare, Michigan, and subsequently parked the WABX calls on WCFX's sister station, 990 AM. WABX/990 ceased operations in 1988. The current 107.5 WABX logo is substantially similar to the Detroit WABX logo used during that station's 1970s' heyday. The former Detroit WABX now broadcasts a country format as WYCD.

== Sale to Midwest Communications ==
It was announced on May 28, 2014, that Midwest Communications will purchase 9 of the 10 stations owned by South Central Communications. (This includes the Evansville Cluster which include WABX along with sister stations WIKY-FM, WLFW & WSTO.) With this purchase, Midwest Communications will expand its portfolio of stations to Evansville, Knoxville and Nashville. The sale was finalized on September 2, 2014, at a price of $72 million.
