= University of Evansville =

Liberal arts university in Evansville, Indiana, US

- Former names: Moores Hill Male and Female Collegiate Institute (1854–1887); Moores Hill College (1887–1919); Evansville College (1919–1967)
- Motto: Changing Lives. Changing the World
- Type: Private university
- Established: 1854; 172 years ago
- Religious affiliation: United Methodist Church
- Academic affiliations: Space-grant
- Endowment: $157 million (2022)
- President: Christopher M. Pietruszkiewicz
- Students: 2,109 (fall 2023)
- Undergraduates: 1,741 (fall 2023)
- Postgraduates: 368 (fall 2023)
- Location: Evansville, Indiana, U.S.
- Campus: Urban, 100 acres (40 ha)
- Colors: Purple, white, and orange
- Nickname: Purple Aces
- Sporting affiliations: NCAA Division I – Missouri Valley
- Mascot: Ace Purple
- Website: evansville.edu

The University of Evansville (UE) is a private university in Evansville, Indiana, United States. It was founded in 1854 as Moores Hill College. The university operates a satellite center, Harlaxton College, in Grantham, England. UE offers more than 80 different majors and areas of study, each housed within three colleges and one school within the university: the Schroeder School of Business, the College of Education and Health Sciences, the College of Engineering and Computer Science, and the William L. Ridgway College of Arts and Sciences. The school is affiliated with the United Methodist Church.

Total enrollment (including full and part-time, undergraduate, adult, graduate, and UE students at Harlaxton) is 2,443 students, although full-time undergraduate and Doctor of Physical Therapy enrollment is 1,976 students. The student body represents 55 countries and 44 states with international students comprising 16% of the undergraduate student population. UE athletic teams participate in Division I of the NCAA and are known as the Purple Aces. Evansville is a member of the Missouri Valley Conference.

== History ==
The University of Evansville was founded in 1854. The institution struggled financially during its time in Moores Hill, and a fire destroyed Moore Hall in 1915. The institution continued to operate in a second building, Carnegie Hall, until the move to Evansville. The former campus in Moores Hill continued operation as an elementary and high school. Carnegie Hall is now maintained as a museum.

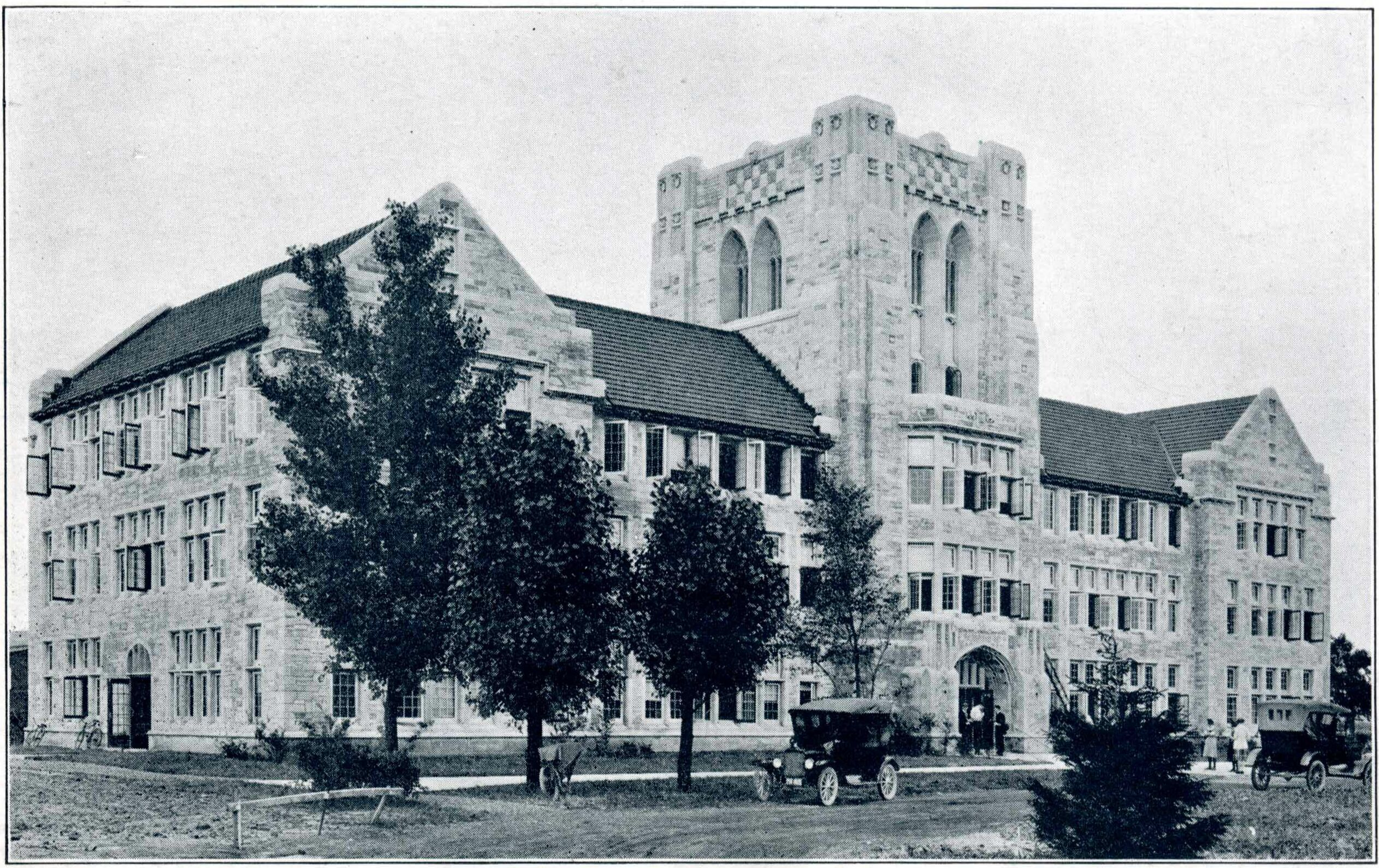
Olmsted Hall, c. 1924

In 1919, the school moved to Evansville and its name was changed to Evansville College. It operated in temporary quarters in downtown Evansville until Administration Hall (now Olmsted Hall) was completed in 1922. This is the only building remaining on campus from before World War II.

In the period from World War II to 1960, Evansville College grew significantly. Enrollment grew from about 400 during the Great Depression to 1,500 in 1946. Also following the war, the Science and Engineering Building and Alumni Memorial Union were commissioned. The Clifford Memorial Library was completed in 1957. Five residence halls were built between 1958 and 1967, along with a fitness center, dining hall, and an art building. In 1967, the school was renamed to the University of Evansville. Also in 1967, a new theater building, Hyde Hall, housing Shanklin Theater was finished.

In 2010, the University of Evansville completed early its Endowment Campaign to raise $80 million after having raised an additional $60 million five years previous to the new campaign. On July 1, 2018, Christopher M. Pietruszkiewicz became the University of Evansville's 24th president.

The University of Evansville faced significant criticism from the Evansville community over its handling of the sale of approximately 42 acres of land near Wesselman Woods. In January 2019, UE announced plans to sell this off-campus property to fund the construction of a new campus health and wellness center. This proposal alarmed supporters of Wesselman Woods Nature Preserve, who feared that selling the land for commercial development would remove a valuable buffer zone between urban development and the preserve's old-growth forest, potentially harming its delicate ecosystem. Critics accused the administration of prioritizing financial gain over environmental and community concerns, which further damaged the university's reputation. UE sold the property to Wesselman Woods in 2023 for $2 million.

== Academics ==
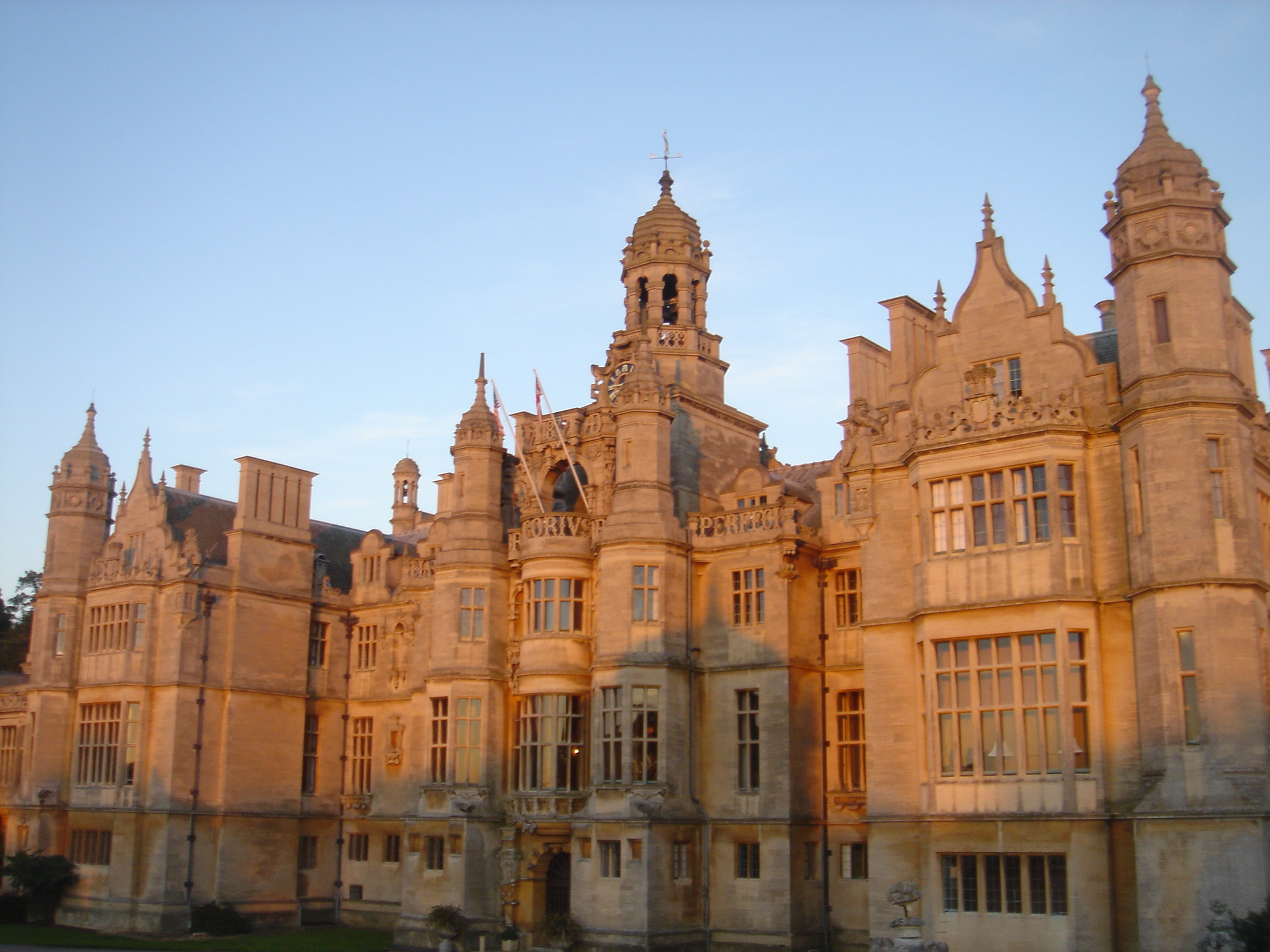
Harlaxton Manor in 2005

The University of Evansville is academically organized into three colleges and three schools:

- William L. Ridgway College of Arts & Sciences
- College of Education & Health Sciences
  - School of Education
  - School of Public Health
- College of Engineering & Computer Science
- Schroeder Family School of Business Administration

=== Accreditation ===
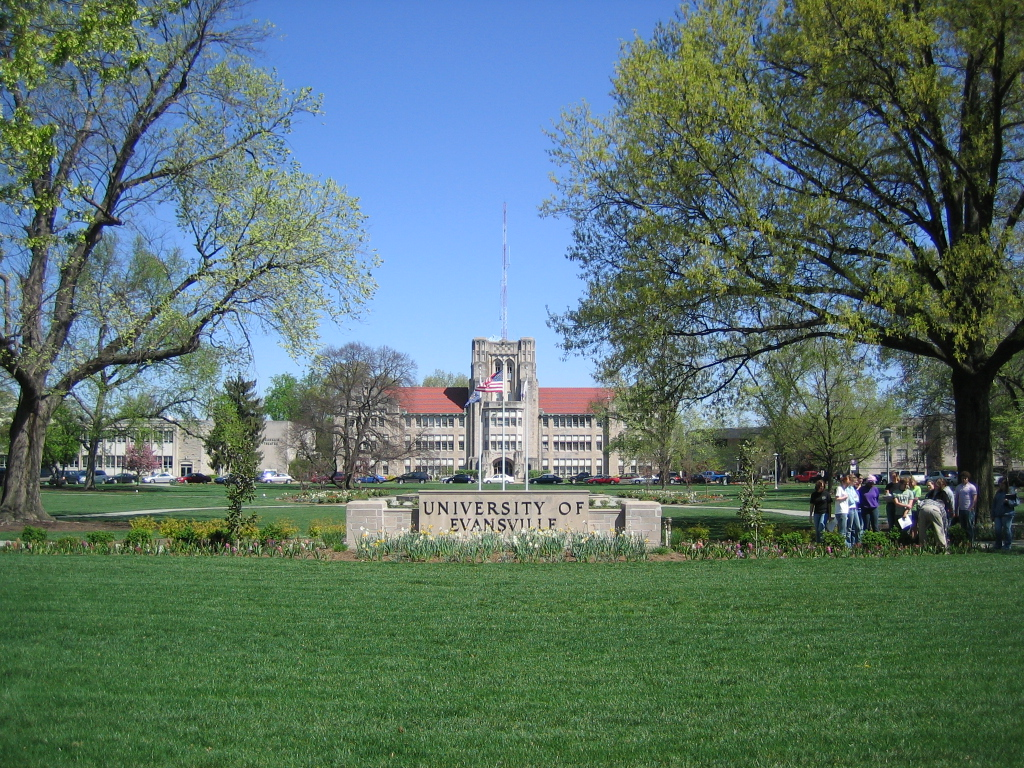
Front Oval in the Spring of 2005

The electrical and mechanical engineering programs have been continuously accredited by ABET (the Accreditation Board for Engineering and Technology) since 1970, and the civil engineering and computer engineering programs since 1997. The School of Business Administration is accredited by the Association to Advance Collegiate Schools of Business and provides a variety of professional programs in accounting, economics, finance, global business, management or marketing. The Department of Music is accredited by the National Association of Schools of Music (NASM). The Exercise Science major is endorsed by the American College of Sports Medicine (ACSM) and the National Strength and Conditioning Association (NSCA). The Dunigan Family Department of Nursing is accredited by the Indiana State Board of Nursing and the Accreditation Commission for Education in Nursing, Inc.

=== Rankings ===
In 2022, U.S. News & World Report ranked the University of Evansville against other regional Midwest universities, awarding it #7 overall, #3 for veterans, and #12 for value. It called the school's admissions policy "more selective."

=== Harlaxton College ===
In addition to studying in the city of Evansville, the university's students can choose to study abroad in England at Harlaxton College, "The British Campus of the University of Evansville". The college was formed and controlled by Stanford University prior to its passing to The University of Evansville. The college is located at Harlaxton Manor, about 115 miles north of London in Lincolnshire, a few miles away from the town of Grantham, England (home of Sir Isaac Newton and Margaret Thatcher and Thomas Paine). The study abroad program at the University of Evansville has consistently been rated as one of the best study abroad programs in the nation, ranked #1 in Europe and #7 globally.

==== Harlaxton Bureau at Harlaxton College ====
On July 30, 1997, the now-closed student radio station 91.5 FM WUEV opened the former Harlaxton Bureau at Harlaxton College, Lincolnshire, England. Shortly thereafter, Harlaxton Bureau correspondents covered the death of Princess Diana and were subsequently recognized by the Indiana Society of Professional Journalists. This made the University of Evansville the first American to have a student-run news bureau on a foreign campus.

==== The Haunting, 1999 movie filmed at Harlaxton ====
While the manor is a popular location for filming for both exterior and interior shots have featured in a variety of TV shows and films, The Haunting, (1999), starring Lili Taylor, Liam Neeson, Catherine Zeta-Jones, and Owen Wilson, was one of the most popular using Harlaxton Manor in Grantham, Lincolnshire. The manor was used as the exterior location for 'Hill House.' For the film, a 'carport' porch entrance was added, and the carved lettering on the building was blanked out. Although most interior scenes were created on soundstages in Florida, some scenes were filmed at Harlaxton Manor, including those in the carved wood-panel Great Hall, which served as the 'Billiard Room' in the movie.

=== Theatre department ===
The UE theatre department operates at Shanklin Theatre, which features a 482-seat thrust stage design extending into the audience on three sides. UE's alumni include Ron Glass, Jack McBrayer, Rutina Wesley, Crista Flanagan, Kelli Giddish, Carrie Preston, Rami Malek (winner of the Academy Award, Golden Globe Award, Screen Actors Guild Award, and British Academy Film Award for Best Actor), and Deirdre Lovejoy.

== Campus ==
The university campus is characterized by its grassy open spaces and tree cover. The university landscape is well maintained, and many students take advantage of the spacious lawns and large shade trees. The campus is bounded on the north by the Lloyd Expressway, the south by Lincoln Avenue, west by Rotherwood Avenue, and on the east by Weinbach Avenue. Walnut Street bisects the campus. Sesquicentennial Oval, the ceremonial entrance to campus, opens off of Lincoln Avenue. The oval was named in 2004 in commemoration of the university's 150th anniversary. The Schroeder Family School of Business, McCurdy Alumni Memorial Union, Sampson Hall / Mann Health Center, Hyde Hall, Olmsted Administration Hall, Clifford Memorial Library, and Koch (pronounced Cook) Center for Science and Engineering (all sectors of the original and later additional science/engineering buildings) surround Sesquicentennial Oval. Most of the buildings follow an old limestone motif, and renovations generally emulate the rest of the building.

- Evansville College
- U.S. National Register of Historic Places
- Location within Indiana Location within the United States
- Location: 1800 Lincoln Ave., Evansville, Indiana
- Coordinates: 37°58′17″N 87°31′54″W
- Area: 7 acres (2.8 ha)
- Built: 1921
- Architect: Miller, Fullenwider, & Dowling; Anderson & Veatch
- Architectural style: Collegiate Gothic
- NRHP reference No.: 83000106
- Added to NRHP: February 3, 1983

The Administration Hall and the President's House and Circle were named to the National Register of Historic Places in 1983.

Koch Center was originally named the Engineering and Science Building when it was built in 1947. The motivation for the new building stemmed from WWII, after which UE expected a greater number of students to enroll with the intent of getting industrial degrees. After renovations in the late 1970s, the building was renamed in November 1984 in honor of Robert Louis Koch who had been a member of the UE Board of Trustees since 1968; Koch had recently given a donation to the university's New Century Capital Campaign that was being used to build a new library. (Not to be confused with the Kochs, Robert L. Koch was the chairman of the board of George Koch Sons, Inc.—an industrial company in Evansville—and son of Louis J. Koch, founder of the Holiday World amusement park.) Koch Center experienced another renovation, including a large new addition on its south side, in 2001.

In 2016, the Peters-Margedant House museum was moved to campus and then opened for tours in 2017.

== Athletics ==
The University of Evansville athletic teams have the nickname the Purple Aces (originally the "Pioneers"). Both men's and women's varsity sports play at the NCAA Division I level and compete in the Missouri Valley Conference, except for the men's swimming and diving teams which compete in the Mid-American Conference

== Media ==
WUEV started in 1951, was a noncommercial, 6100-watt FM Radio station located at 91.5 MHz, owned and operated by the University of Evansville. WUEV also streamed online and became the first internet radio station in Indiana in 1996. The station was operated entirely by a student staff.

On May 17, 2019, the University of Evansville made what members of the Evansville community claimed to be a controversial decision to sell the students' station to WAY-FM, a non-profit nationwide network that plays contemporary Christian music.

While the story garnered national media attention from major media outlets and public scrutiny in support of the students and WUEV, the issue was brought to light in September 2018 when a group of University of Evansville alumni, community, and students began to uncover information that the University of Evansville previously had kept from the public as reported by WEHT News 25. The university later admitted in 2019 the decision was made over a two-year study since 2016 which they previously never mentioned.

The FCC finalized the transfer of WUEV's license to WAY-FM on November 25, 2019. The terrestrial signal went silent at 11 p.m. CST. The final song played on WUEV was "Closing Time" by Semisonic. The station began broadcasting WAY-FM programming on November 26, 2019, and changed its call sign to WJWA on December 4, 2019.

== Notable alumni ==
Alumni include numerous prominent entertainers, sports stars, writers, and scientists. Among them are:

- Richard Harbert Smith, professor and researcher of aeronautical engineering
- Matt Williams, TV producer and writer
- Rami Malek, actor
- Jack McBrayer, actor
- John B. Conaway, United States Air Force officer
- Jerry Sloan, basketball player and coach
- David Weir, Scottish international soccer player
- Marilyn Durham, novelist
- Deirdre Lovejoy, actress
- Lisel Mueller, poet
- Jim Michaels, TV producer
- Ron Glass, actor
- Carrie Preston, actress
- Toby Onwumere, actor
- Andy Benes, baseball player
- Kyle Freeland, baseball player
- Kelli Giddish, actor
- Crista Flanagan, actor and comedian
- Jeff Galfer, actor, producer, and writer
- Kent Parker, business executive and investor
- Craig R Tooley, American engineer at NASA

== Bibliography ==
- Klinger, George; "We Face the Future Unafraid" (Evansville, Ind; University of Evansville Press, 2003). ISBN 978-0-930982-56-0
