= House Mountain (Knox County, Tennessee) =

Mountain in the U.S. state of Tennessee

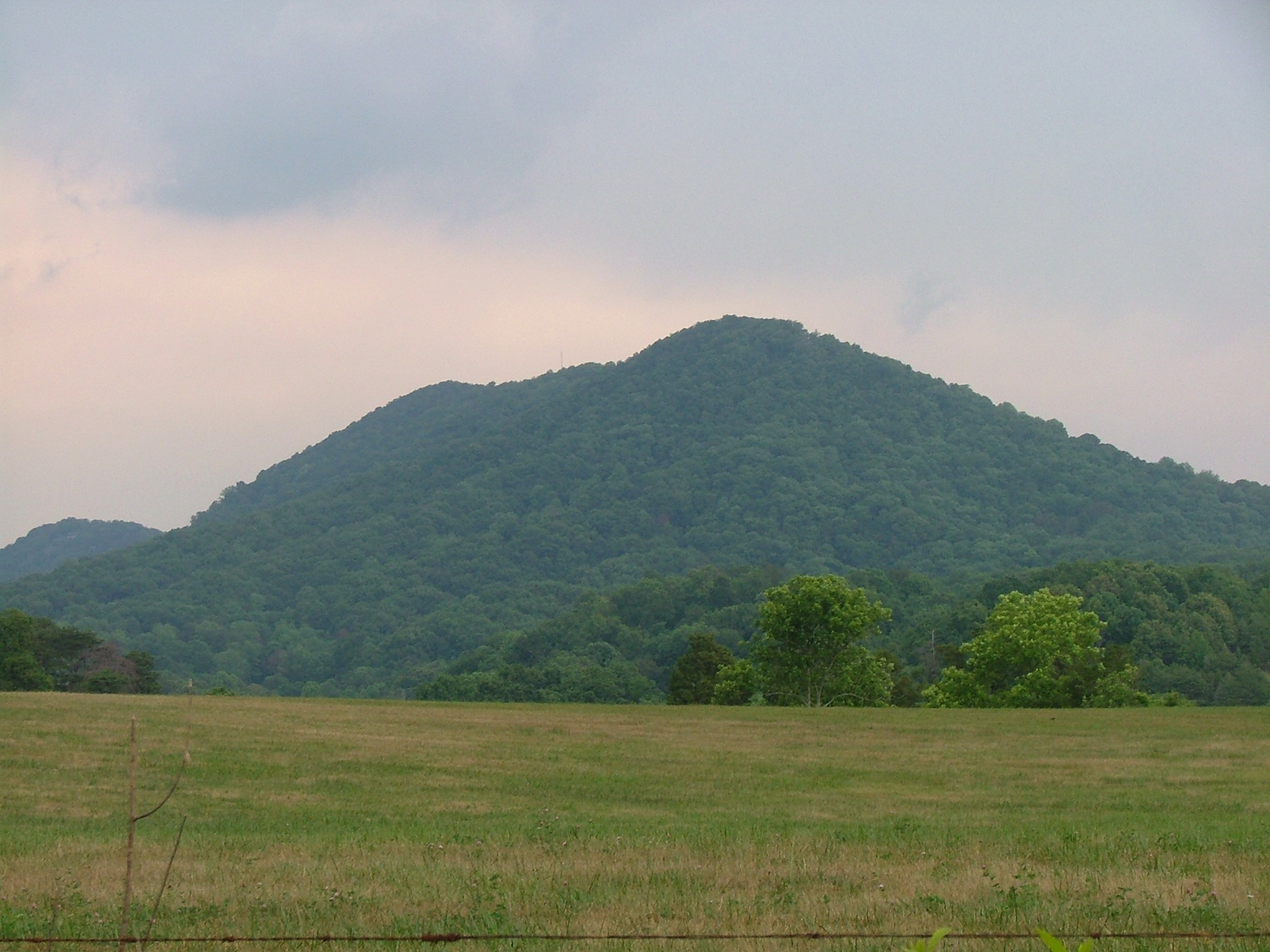
- View from the northwest, looking to the east-southeast. The tower barely visible between the two peaks is not on top of the mountain itself, but rather, about 50 feet (15 m) down the north slope, on the western end.

Highest point
- Elevation: 2,064 ft (629 m)
- Coordinates: 36°06′42″N 83°46′00″W

Geography
- Location: Knox County, Tennessee, U.S.
- Parent range: Ridge-and-valley Appalachians
- Topo map: USGS John Sevier

House Mountain is a mountain located in Corryton, Tennessee, United States, about 8 miles (13 km) northeast of Knoxville. Rising to an elevation of 2,064 feet (629 m) above sea level, House Mountain is the highest point in Knox County.

The House Mountain State Natural Area— designated in 1987— consists of 527 acres (2.13 km^{2}), mostly on the south side of the mountain. House Mountain is known for its huge sandstone boulders, its wide variety of bird and plant life, and for the views from its two peaks. On a clear day, the Great Smoky Mountains and the upper Unaka Range are visible to the south and east, the Cumberland Plateau is visible to the west, and Powell Mountain and Clinch Mountain are visible to the north and northeast.

The origin of the mountain's name is unknown, though a local legend suggests early settlers thought the mountain was shaped like the roof of a house.

== Geographical and natural setting ==
House Mountain rises from a large plain in eastern Knox County, about 3 miles (4.8 km) southwest of the southern terminus of Clinch Mountain and immediately north of McAnnally Ridge. House, McAnnally, and Clinch are all part of the Appalachian Ridge-and-Valley Province, which consists of a series of narrow, elongate ridges stretching in a northeast-to-southwest direction between the main Appalachian crest to the east and the Cumberland Plateau to the west. These ridges are typically flanked by fertile river valleys that are part of the upper Tennessee River watershed.

House Mountain stretches for just over 3 miles (4.8 km) from its southwestern base along Hogskin Branch to its northeastern base along Flat Creek, and covers approximately 2,500 acres (10 km^{2}). The mountain's crest is crowned by two main peaks— one rising southwest of the center of the mountain and one rising on the mountain's northeastern end. The southwest peak is the true summit, although both peaks rise above 2000 feet.

Geologically, House Mountain is a "synclinal outlier" of Clinch Mountain. Erosion by Flat Creek— which lies halfway between House and Clinch— separated the two mountains in ancient times. Like all of the Ridge-and-Valleys, House Mountain was created approximately 250 million years ago during the Alleghenian orogeny mountain-building epoch. House Mountain's base is covered with a mesophytic forest consisting chiefly of maple, tulip poplar, ash, and buckeye. Chestnut oak and table mountain pine dominate the mountain's steeper slopes and upper elevations.

== Broadcasting history ==
Located about a half mile east of House Mountain on much lower Zachary Ridge (behind House Mountain in the picture) is a 1,751-foot (534 m) broadcasting tower, formerly owned and used by WBIR-TV, Channel 10, Knoxville. The tall tower was actually built in 1963 because the former owners of WBIR— seeking to expand their broadcast coverage in the early 1960s— were unable to purchase private property atop House Mountain to build a new, much shorter tower for their antenna.

In a 1983 interview with PM Magazine, John Reece, former WATE-TV program director and former shareholder in the station's ownership, told the intriguing story of how House Mountain contributed a small part to Knoxville's broadcasting history. According to Reece, WBIR— WATE's VHF rival in Knoxville— had long wanted to move from its original 800-foot (240 m) tower on Sharp's Ridge in downtown Knoxville (which is still standing), to a much higher site atop House Mountain. If a new WBIR tower had been built atop House Mountain 15 miles (24 km) away as the station's owners had planned, the tower would have only needed to be about 600 to 700 feet (210 m) to reach the 1,800-foot (550 m) allowable height above average terrain (HAAT) the Federal Communications Commission (FCC) had already approved for the station. According to Reece, so sure was WBIR of moving to House Mountain, the station had concrete piers staked off in 1962, and had already drilled through some of the rocky escarpment on the mountain's apex. Some of those are visible rock outcroppings today.

Reece said his former co-investors, Mountcastle Broadcasting, the then-owners of WATE, who had been anticipating a WBIR House Mountain tower and its wide broadcasting coverage area, quickly purchased that property, which happened to be the only property for sale on the mountaintop that could be used as a tower base. The WATE owners then convinced the adjoining property owners not to sell their property atop House Mountain, citing aesthetic reasons. Thus, WBIR was forced to spend millions of dollars in 1963 to build a taller tower for its broadcasting antenna in the surrounding valley below. The resulting 1,751-foot (534 m) tower, now owned by South Central Communications and used by its local station, WIMZ-FM 103.5, was and still is the tallest man-made structure in the state of Tennessee. After WBIR was forced to build the tall tower, WATE then sold its newly acquired House Mountain property to a private owner.

Eventually, WBIR-TV moved to a shorter tower (1,504 ft) back on Sharp's Ridge near downtown Knoxville, built right next to its original 800-foot (240 m) tower. Ironically, WATE-TV now operates an adjacent tower on Sharp's Ridge, which is 20 feet (6.1 m) higher than WBIR-TV's.

== House Mountain State Natural Area ==
The House Mountain State Natural Area consists of 527 acres (2.13 km^{2}) managed by the Tennessee Department of Environment and Conservation and Knox County Parks & Recreation. The Trust for Public Land purchased the plot in 1985 and sold it to the state of Tennessee in 1987. An interpretive kiosk, picnic facilities, and approximately 5 miles (8.0 km) of trails were constructed in the early 1990s. According to signs posted, users can enjoy from sunrise to sunset.

== Photo gallery ==
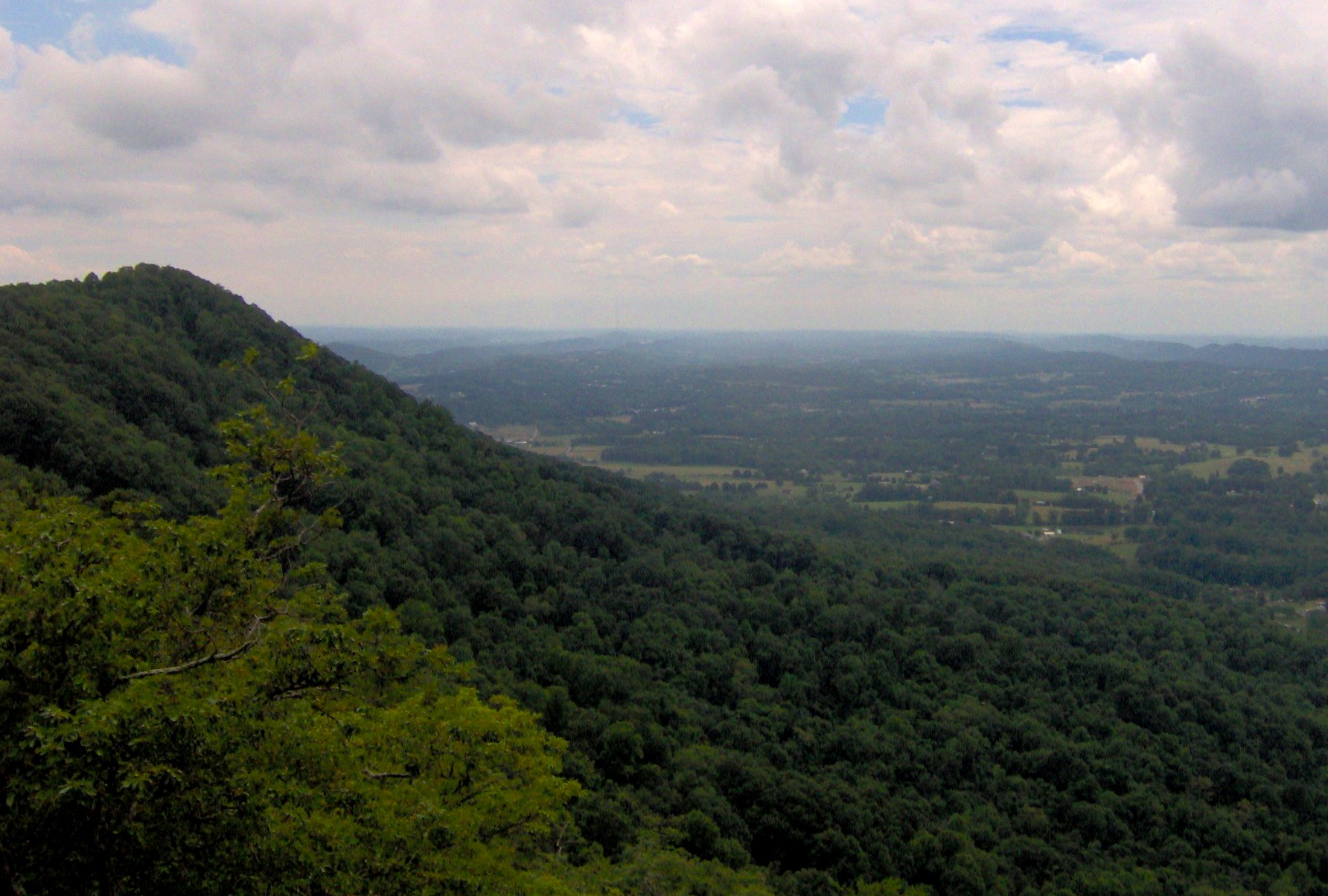
Looking southwest across the crest of House Mountain

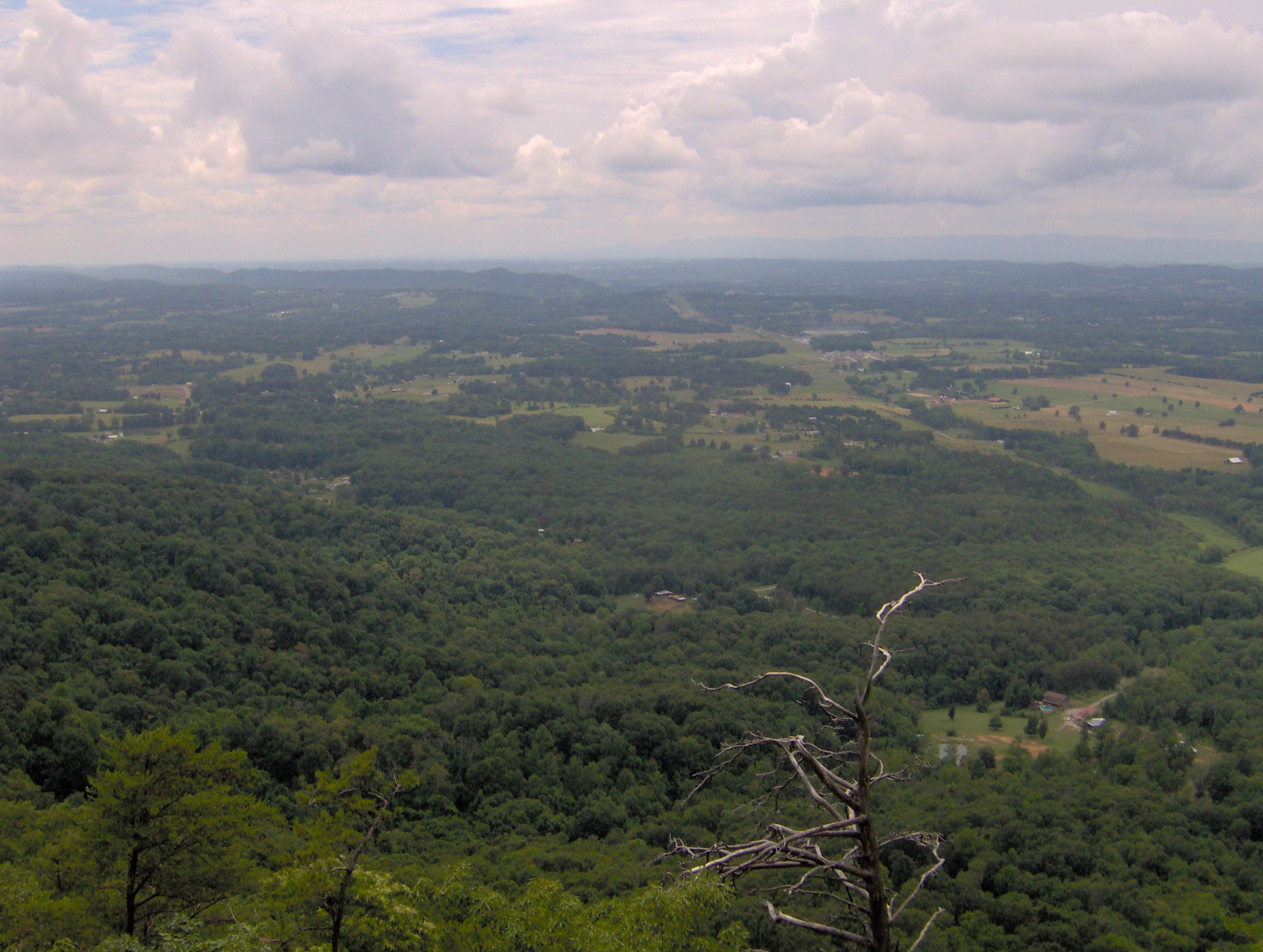
Looking west across north Knox County

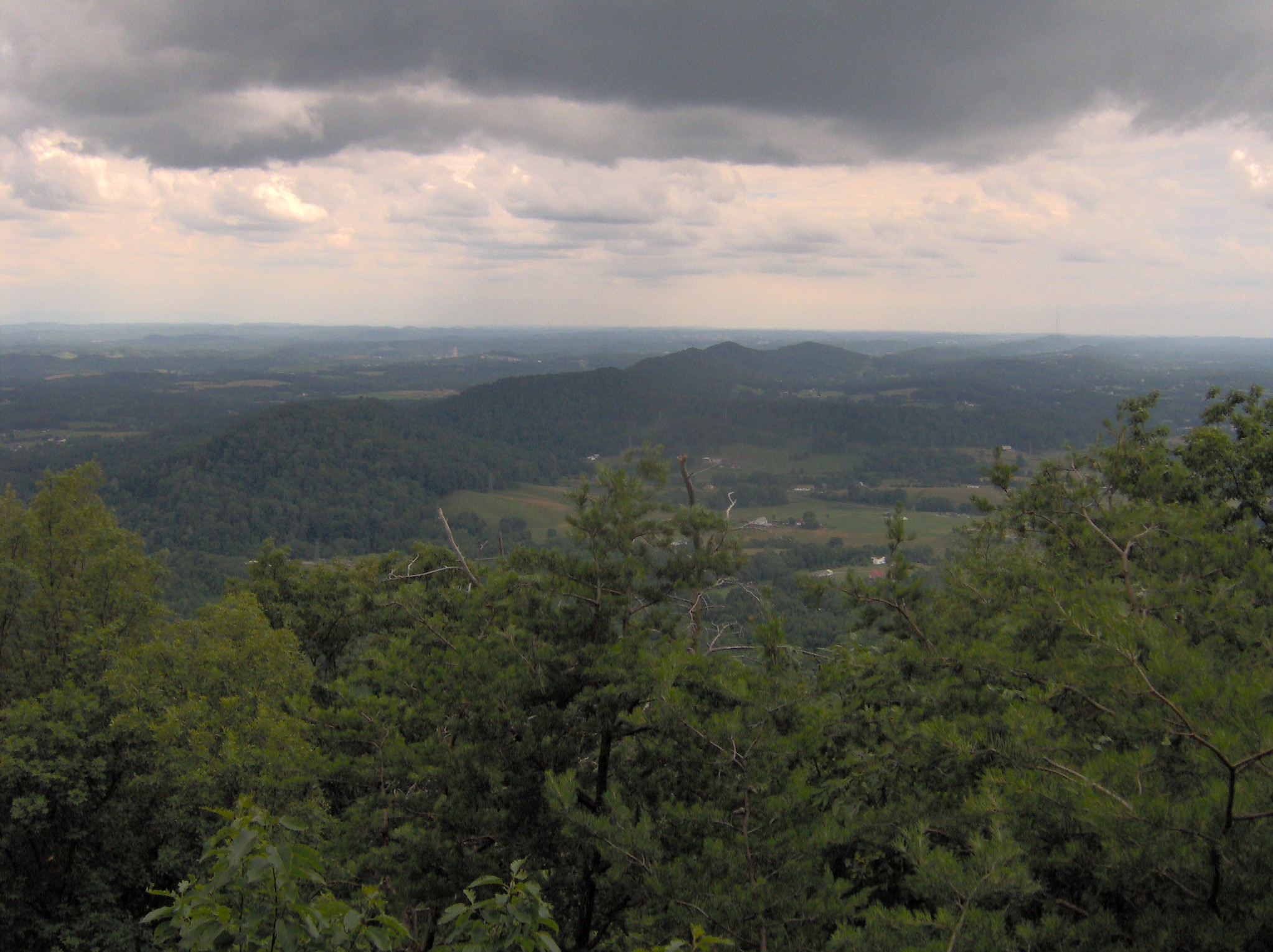
Looking southwest from the West Overlook; McAnnally Ridge is below

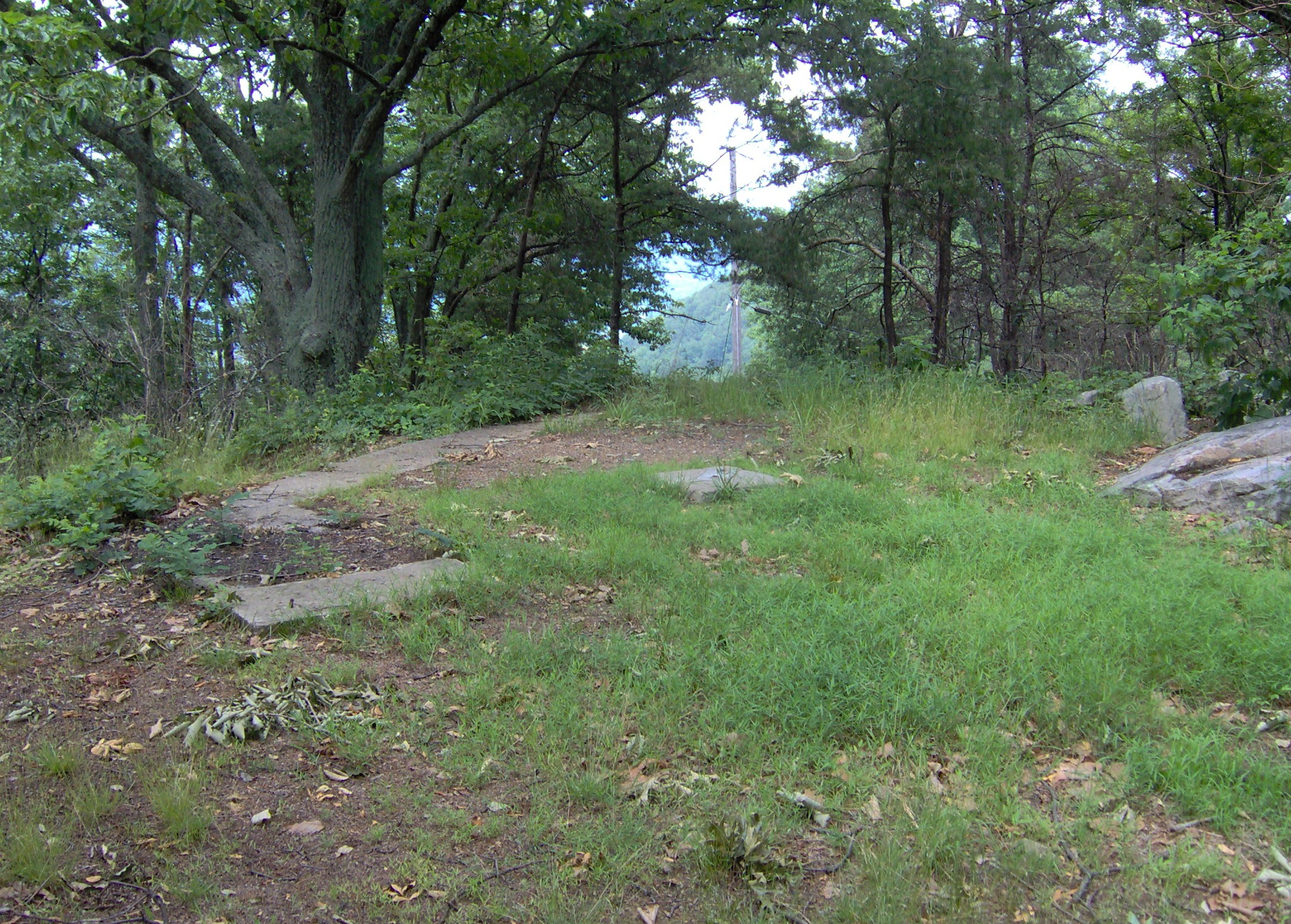
The summit of House Mountain

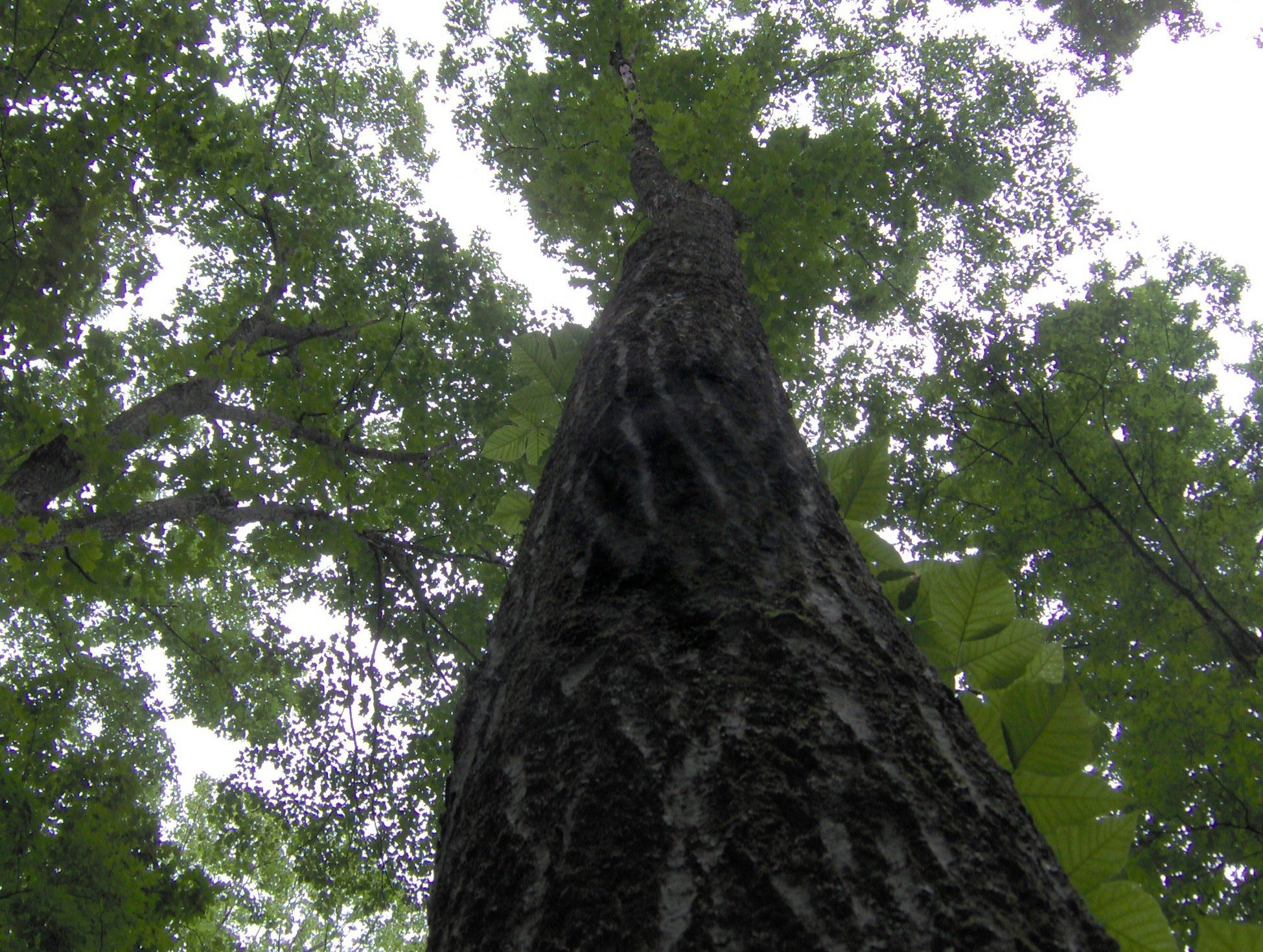
Red Oak tree along the Right Sawmill Trail

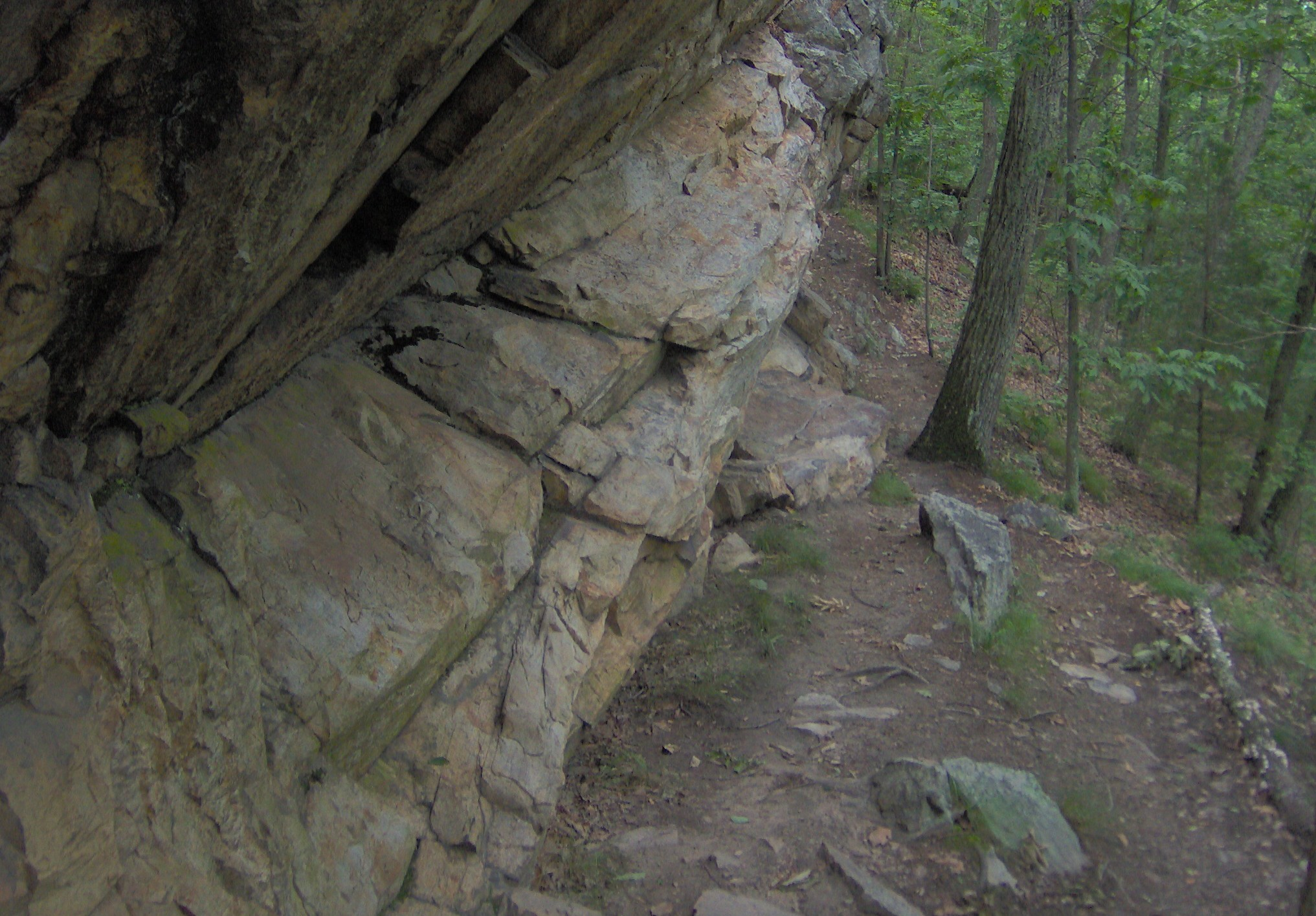
Sandstone outcropping along the West Overlook Trail
