= WIMZ-FM =

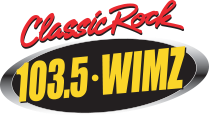
- Knoxville, Tennessee; United States
- Broadcast area: East Tennessee
- Frequency: 103.5 MHz (HD Radio)
- Branding: 103.5 WIMZ

Programming
- Format: Classic rock
- Affiliations: Compass Media Networks; Premiere Networks; United Stations Radio Networks

Ownership
- Owner: Midwest Communications; (Midwest Communications, Inc.)
- Sister stations: WJXB-FM; WDKW; WNFZ

History
- First air date: September 25, 1949
- Former call signs: WBIR-FM (1949–1980)

Technical information
- Licensing authority: FCC
- Facility ID: 61046
- Class: C
- ERP: 79,000 watts
- HAAT: 525 meters (1,722 ft)
- Transmitter coordinates: 36°8′6.3″N 83°43′28.6″W

Links
- Public license information: Public file; LMS
- Webcast: Listen live; Listen live (via iHeartRadio)
- Website: www.wimz.com

WIMZ-FM (103.5 MHz) is a commercial radio station in Knoxville, Tennessee, serving East Tennessee. It is owned by Midwest Communications and broadcasts a classic rock radio format. The studios and offices are on Sharps Ridge Memorial Park Drive in Knoxville.

Weekday mornings begin with The John Boy and Billy Show syndicated by Premiere Networks from WRFX in Charlotte. Local DJs are heard the rest of the day. On weekends, WIMZ carries The House of Hair with Dee Snider and Time Warp with Bill St. James. The station is heard on the iHeartRadio website and app.

== Tower ==
The WIMZ tower is 534 meters (1,752 ft) tall. It is a guy-wired aerial mast, designed for broadcasting Channel 10 WBIR-TV, originally the CBS Network affiliate for Knoxville (geographical coordinates: 36°8′6″N 83°43′29″W). The tower was completed during September 1963 and at the time was the tallest structure in the world. It is currently owned by South Central Communications.

WIMZ has an effective radiated power (ERP) of 79,000 watts, among the most powerful radio stations in East Tennessee. Its signal can be received in parts of Kentucky, Virginia, North Carolina, Georgia and South Carolina.

While the tower was on one of the tallest peaks in the area, WBIR-TV's signal was shielded by mountains from some communities west of Knoxville, including Farragut, Oak Ridge, and Lenoir City. To improve its signal in those towns, Channel 10 relocated to Sharp's Ridge near downtown Knoxville during the 1970s, and the FM station remained on the original tower. To maintain coverage, WIMZ's antenna is located 525 meters (1,722 ft) in height above average terrain (HAAT), about 9 meters (30 ft) below the top of the tower.

Before the tall WBIR-TV mast was built in 1963, the owner of the television station had planned the tower to be erected on nearby House Mountain, the tallest point in Knox County, Tennessee. But WBIR's main competitor WATE-TV Channel 6 ended that idea by purchasing all the property on top of House Mountain, forcing the WBIR owners to build a taller tower on nearby Zachary Ridge at Blaine, Tennessee.

== History ==
=== WBIR-FM ===
The station first signed on the air on September 25, 1949. The original call sign was WBIR-FM, mostly simulcasting its AM counterpart, WBIR 1240 AM (later WIFA). The studios were on Gay Street in Knoxville. Television station WBIR-TV Channel 10 was added in 1956. WBIR-AM-FM-TV were owned by a consortium headed by J. Lindsay Nunn and his son, Gilmore Nunn.

WBIR-AM-FM were network affiliates of ABC, carrying its dramas, comedies, news and sports during the "Golden Age of Radio". As network programming moved to television, WBIR-AM-FM switched to a full service, middle of the road format of popular adult music, news, talk and sports. In the late 1960s, WBIR-FM separated its programming from the AM station, airing an automated country music format.

=== Rock station WIMZ ===
In 1979, the station flipped to album-oriented rock (AOR). The last song played on WBIR-FM's country format was "Waltz Across Texas" by Ernest Tubb. In the middle of the song, the turntable was switched off until the song spun to a stop. There was brief moment of silence and then a voice was broadcast that said, "WBIR FM, Rock 104. We Believe In Rock." At that point, Led Zeppelin's "Stairway To Heaven" began playing. Not long after, the call letters were changed to WIMZ-FM, with the station calling itself "Rock 104".

At the start of 1983, WIMZ altered its format to add more new wave and heavy metal music acts and reduce much of the 1960s and early 70s classic rock. It also stopped using the name Rock 104 and began identifying as "103.5 WIMZ", with a new logo modeled after MTV.

During 1982, co-owned WHEL 1240 AM dropped its adult standards sound and began simulcasting WIMZ-FM's programming. It switched its call letters to WIMZ, while the FM side continued as WIMZ-FM. This simulcast on AM continued for much of the 1980s. The AM station later switched to sports talk and then Christian talk and teaching station WIFA.

During the 1980s and 1990s, WIMZ-FM had a popular morning program hosted by Phil Williams, Billy Kidd, and Colvin Idol (later replaced by David Henley).

=== Sale to Midwest Communications ===
On May 28, 2014, Midwest Communications announced that it would purchase nine of the ten stations owned by South Central Communications, including WIMZ-FM along with sister stations WJXB-FM and WVRX. With this purchase, Midwest Communications expanded its portfolio of stations to Knoxville, Evansville and Nashville. The sale was finalized on September 2, 2014, at a price of $72 million.

As of 2010, The John Boy and Billy Show airs in morning drive time. John Boy Isley was a popular local radio personality in Knoxville during the late 1970s on WRJZ. Their show is syndicated on dozens of stations around the South and Midwest. During recent years, WIMZ's format has changed from consisting the late 1960s through the 1980s rock rotation, focusing more on 1970s hard rock and 1980s hair metal mostly, as of 2020, the station has leaned in on playing a more mainstream rock approach of classic rock that plays more 1990's alternative, grunge and metal and a very small few early 2000's hard rock artists. WIMZ's slogan remained "Classic rock that really rocks" for more than a decade. The station since calls itself "Knoxville's Classic Rock."

== See also ==
- List of masts
- House Mountain

Records
Preceded by WTVM/WRBL-TV & WVRK-FM Tower	World's tallest structure 1,752 ft (534.01 m); 1963	Succeeded by KVLY-TV mast
