= WJXB-FM =

Radio station in Knoxville, Tennessee

Knoxville, Tennessee; United States
- Broadcast area: Knoxville Metropolitan Area
- Frequency: 97.5 MHz
- Branding: B97.5

Programming
- Format: Adult contemporary
- Affiliations: Premiere Networks; United Stations Radio Networks

Ownership
- Owner: Midwest Communications; (Midwest Communications, Inc.)
- Sister stations: WIMZ-FM; WDKW; WNFZ

History
- First air date: April 10, 1967
- Former call signs: WEZK (1967–1993); WEZJ-FM (1993–1994); WJXB (1994–2002)
- Call sign meaning: Sister station of Nashville's WJXA in both name and format, along with station's bee mascot

Technical information
- Licensing authority: FCC
- Facility ID: 61040
- Class: C
- ERP: 100,000 watts
- HAAT: 395 meters (1,296 ft)
- Transmitter coordinates: 36°0′36.2″N 83°55′56.6″W
- Translator: 107.3 W297AX (Knoxville)

Links
- Public license information: Public file; LMS
- Webcast: Listen live
- Website: www.b975.com

WJXB-FM (97.5 MHz, "B97.5") is a commercial radio station in Knoxville, Tennessee, airing an adult contemporary radio format. It is owned by Midwest Communications. B97.5 carries the nationally syndicated call-in and dedication show Delilah in evenings. The studios, offices and transmitter are on Sharp's Ridge Memorial Park Drive in North Knoxville.

WJXB-FM has an effective radiated power (ERP) of 100,000 watts, the maximum for most U.S. radio stations. Programming is also heard on 250-watt FM translator W297AX at 107.3 FM, which helps improve reception in some parts of Knoxville.

== History ==
The station signed on the air on April 10, 1967. It had a beautiful music format. The original call sign was WEZK, which stood for "Easy Listening in Knoxville". WEZK played quarter-hour sweeps of mostly instrumental soft music, especially cover versions of popular adult songs along with Broadway and Hollywood show tunes, with limited commercials and chatter.

The station was assigned the WJXB-FM call letters by the Federal Communications Commission on January 21, 2002. This was to tie into the success of its long-time sister station in Nashville, WJXA (92.9). WJXA was a similar easy listening station in its early years switching to adult contemporary, and like WJXB, has long lead the market in listenership and is similarly-operated. They both use a bee as their mascot.

Management announced on May 28, 2014, that Midwest Communications would purchase nine of the ten radio stations owned by South Central Communications, including WJXB-FM. With this purchase, Midwest Communications expanded its portfolio of stations to Evansville, Knoxville and Nashville. The sale was finalized on September 2, 2014, at a price of $72 million.

== Translator ==
WJXB-FM programming is also carried on an additional broadcast translator station, which due to the area's topography, is used to provide a better signal to listeners and tourists in Sevier County at the edge of the Great Smoky Mountains National Park.

Broadcast translator for WJXB-FM
Call sign	Frequency	City of license	FID	ERP (W)	Class	Transmitter coordinates	FCC info
W297AX	107.3 FM	Knoxville, Tennessee	17782	250	D	35°48′41.3″N 83°40′7.6″W	LMS
