= WDKW =

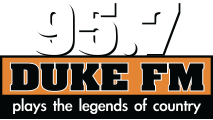
- Maryville, Tennessee; United States
- Broadcast area: Knoxville, Tennessee
- Frequency: 95.7 MHz
- Branding: 95.7 Duke FM

Programming
- Format: Classic Country

Ownership
- Owner: Midwest Communications; (Midwest Communications, Inc.)
- Sister stations: WIMZ-FM, WJXB-FM, WNFZ

History
- First air date: 1990 (as WGAP-FM)
- Former call signs: WYNQ (1988–1990, CP); WGAP-FM (1990–1999); WTXM (1999–2000); WTXM-FM (2000–2005); WQJK (2005–2013); WVRX (2013–2015)
- Call sign meaning: W DuKe W

Technical information
- Licensing authority: FCC
- Facility ID: 23332
- Class: A
- Power: 6,000 watts
- HAAT: 98 meters (322 ft)
- Transmitter coordinates: 35°49′53.0″N 84°01′25.0″W

Links
- Public license information: Public file; LMS
- Webcast: Listen Live
- Website: theduke.fm

WDKW (95.7 FM) is a broadcast radio station licensed to Maryville, Tennessee, serving Knoxville, Tennessee. WDKW is owned and operated by Midwest Communications, Inc. Owner is Duke Wright and current General Manager Michael Brody.

== History ==
This station received its original construction permit from the Federal Communications Commission on August 11, 1988. The new station was assigned the call sign WYNQ by the FCC on August 18, 1988. The station, still under construction, applied for a new call sign as was granted WGAP-FM on January 11, 1990. WGAP-FM received its license to cover from the FCC on December 21, 1990.

In November 1996, Gateway Broadcasting Corporation reached an agreement to sell this station to WGAP Broadcasting Corporation. The deal was approved by the FCC on December 2, 1996, and the transaction was consummated on January 1, 1997.

In January 1999, WGAP Broadcasting Corporation reached an agreement to sell this station to Sounth Central Communications Corporation. The deal was approved by the FCC on January 29, 1999, and the transaction was consummated on February 25, 1999. The new owners had the FCC change the call sign to WTXM on April 16, 1999, and again to WTXM-FM on August 23, 2000. To accompany a format change to adult hits and a "Jack FM" branding, the station's call sign was changed to WQJK on October 28, 2005. WRJK simulcast WQJK until 2012. On August 13, 2012, WQJK flipped to Top 40 as "95.7 Power FM"

logo as 95.7 The X, 2013-2015

At midnight EDT on October 14, 2013, WQJK became WVRX and picked up the active rock format formerly on WNFZ, branding itself as "95-7 The X". WVRX simulcasted on WNFZ until November 1. On November 1, ownership of WNFZ was returned to John W. Pirkle and that station switched to News/Talk.

It was announced on May 28, 2014, that Midwest Communications will purchase 9 of the 10 stations owned by South Central Communications. (This includes WVRX along with sister stations WIMZ-FM & WJXB-FM) With this purchase, Midwest Communications will expand its portfolio of stations to Evansville, Knoxville and Nashville. The sale was finalized on September 2, 2014, at a price of $72 million.

On May 7, 2015 at 3 p.m., after firing the entire air staff, WVRX flipped to classic country as "95.7 Duke FM". On May 19, 2015, WVRX changed callsigns to WDKW.
