= WYNG (FM) =

- Mount Carmel, Illinois; United States
- Broadcast area: Evansville, Indiana
- Frequency: 94.9 MHz

Programming
- Format: CCM
- Network: K-Love

Ownership
- Owner: Educational Media Foundation

History
- Former call signs: WYER-FM (1979–1989); WRBT (1989–1996); WTRI-FM (1996–2001); WKRI (2001–2003)

Technical information
- Licensing authority: FCC
- Facility ID: 56560
- Class: B
- ERP: 50,000 watts
- HAAT: 128.0 meters
- Transmitter coordinates: 38°23′57.00″N 87°47′18.00″W

Links
- Public license information: Public file; LMS

WYNG is a radio station licensed to Mount Carmel, Illinois and serving the Evansville, Indiana market at 94.9 FM. The current format is Educational Media Foundation's Christian contemporary K-Love.

== History ==
WYNG acquired the 94.9 frequency in 2003 when the Regent Broadcasting changed frequencies and adopted a Country format. After stations WBKR and WKDQ were acquired from Clear Channel Communications by Regent Broadcasting, Regent decided to change WYNG's programming to an all Sports format – primarily using ESPN Radio syndicated programming.

On August 25, 2006, Regent sold WYNG to Withers Broadcasting Companies, a Mount Vernon, Illinois company that operates multiple radio/television stations in several states, including Kentucky, West Virginia, and Missouri.

ESPN's format was dropped as of January 1, 2007 and the ESPN affiliation moved to WYFX 106.7. Long time WGBF/WYNG sportscaster Dan Egierski is now Vice President of Evansville Sports Programming Inc., which is active in sales for WYFX.

WVMC (AM) has been added to their line-up of stations.

On January 11, 2016, WYNG, LLC. sold WYNG to EMF Broadcasting for $450,000 along with Iowa stations KOKX-FM and KRNQ; EMF flipped the station to its K-Love network upon the sale's closure on March 18, 2016.

== Non-music operations ==
WYNG has an extensive news department providing news at the top of the hour between 6 A.M. and 6 P.M. However, most of the updates are not live. The transcript of the report is posted on their website daily. WYNG is a part of the St. Louis Cardinals radio network.

== Previous logos ==
WYNG logo as an ESPN Radio affiliate, prior to 2007.

WYNG logo prior to the EMF purchase.
