= WKDQ =

Coordinates: 37.883°N 87.541°W

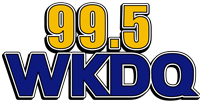
- Henderson, Kentucky; United States
- Broadcast area: Evansville, Indiana
- Frequency: 99.5 MHz
- Branding: 99.5 WKDQ

Programming
- Format: Country
- Affiliations: Compass Media Networks

Ownership
- Owner: Townsquare Media; (Townsquare Media of Evansville/Owensboro, Inc.)
- Sister stations: WDKS, WGBF, WGBF-FM, WJLT

Technical information
- Licensing authority: FCC
- Facility ID: 6871
- Class: C0
- ERP: 100,000 watts
- HAAT: 300 meters (980 ft)

Links
- Public license information: Public file; LMS
- Webcast: Listen Live
- Website: wkdq.com

WKDQ (99.5 FM) is a country music formatted radio station in Henderson, Kentucky radio market, broadcasting to Evansville, Indiana. The owner is Townsquare Media.

== History ==
Begun by Hecht Lackey, owner of WSON (860 AM), the station received the call-letters WSON-FM when it signed on the air in 1947, and most of the FM station's programming in the early years was simulcast from the AM station. In 1971, the FM station switched to a rock format, and the call letters were changed to WKDQ. By the early 1980s, its rock formula was dropped for CHR.

In September 1986, WKDQ dropped Top 40 and switched to an adult contemporary format (which sometimes the station also includes an oldies hybrid a few years later), and was known on-air as "KQ99." While it did reasonably well, management saw more significant opportunities in challenging "WYNG 105" (now WJLT, 105.3 FM) and WBKR (92.5 FM). So in late 1992, WKDQ flipped to country.

The station instantly became a success, surpassing WYNG and WBKR in ratings. Eventually, WYNG's country format was eliminated and eventually those call letters moved to 94.9 FM in Mt. Carmel, Illinois. WKDQ is currently the highest rated country station in the Evansville market and a close second to WIKY (104.1 FM) among all stations in the market.

== Other facts ==
During severe weather situations, the audio of ABC television affiliate WEHT News25's weather coverage is aired on WKDQ until the severe weather has moved out of the listening area.

== On-air personalities ==
5-10am - Q Crew Morning Show with Ryan and Leslie 10am-3pm - Jess on the Job 3pm-7pm - Afternoons with Travis Sams 7pm-Mid - Taste of County Nights
