= WMVI (FM) =

Coordinates: 37.9342°N 87.9264°W

- Mount Vernon, Indiana; United States
- Broadcast area: Posey County, Indiana
- Frequency: 106.7 MHz
- Branding: 106.7 WMVI

Programming
- Format: Adult contemporary
- Affiliations: Fox News Radio

Ownership
- Owner: The Original Company, Inc.
- Operator: Posey County Radio
- Sister stations: WPIW

History
- First air date: 1992 (as WBLZ)
- Former call signs: WBLZ (1992–1996); WBLZ-FM (1996–1999); WYFX (1999–2022)

Technical information
- Licensing authority: FCC
- Facility ID: 53089
- Class: A
- ERP: 3,000 watts
- HAAT: 90 meters (300 ft)

Links
- Public license information: Public file; LMS
- Webcast: Listen Live
- Website: www.poseycountyradio.com

WMVI (106.7 FM) is a Class A radio station licensed to Mount Vernon, Indiana, serving the Posey County, Indiana market. The format became ESPN Radio on January 1, 2007. The station is owned by The Original Company, based in Vincennes, Indiana. It used to air Indiana Pacers basketball, Indianapolis Colts football, and St. Louis Cardinals baseball, as well as Indiana University football and basketball. The station now only has affiliations with Indiana University men's football and basketball. The primary sports coverage is now Mount Vernon Wildcats Athletics including football and boys varsity basketball.

== History ==
The station began broadcasting as WBLZ in 1992, when the FCC granted a license to cover. It was operated from the same building as WPCO in Mount Vernon and broadcast from the same tower site. At various times, the two stations have broadcast the same programming.

WBLZ was purchased from the Posey County Broadcasting Company by The Original Company in May 1999, and the call sign was changed to WYFX. The station picked up ABC Radio Networks' ABC AC format later that year. Later, the simulcast with 1590 would return as WYFX began broadcasting ABC's Real Country format. This lasted until January 1, 2007, when the station picked up ESPN Radio after the all-sports format was dropped by WYNG.

WYFX began a local sports program featuring former WYNG personality Dan Egerski in December 2007.

On May 31, 2014, WYFX's contract to carry ESPN Radio expired; the station continued to carry the St. Louis Cardinals, Blues and local sports broadcasts. On June 4, 2014, WYFX changed their format to news/talk.

As of January 2016, WYFX flipped to a simulcast of classic hits-formatted sister station WJPS 107.1 FM.

On December 19, 2016, WYFX dropped its simulcast with WJPS and returned to a sports format, branded as "Fox Sports 106.7", with programming from Fox Sports Radio.

On July 25, 2022, WYFX changed its format from sports to gold-based adult contemporary, branded as "106.7 WMVI". The station changed its call letters to WMVI on September 12, 2022.

== Previous logos ==
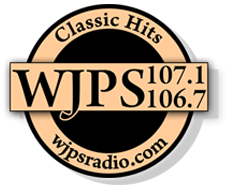
