= WSTO =

Radio station in Owensboro, Kentucky

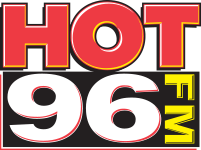
- Owensboro, Kentucky; United States
- Broadcast area: Henderson–Evansville, Indiana (IN-KY-IL Tri-State area)
- Frequency: 96.1 MHz
- Branding: Hot 96

Programming
- Format: Top 40 (CHR)

Ownership
- Owner: Midwest Communications; (Midwest Communications, Inc.)
- Sister stations: WABX; WIKY-FM; WLYD

History
- First air date: June 2, 1948
- Former call signs: WVJS-FM (1948–1962)
- Call sign meaning: "Stereo"

Technical information
- Class: C
- ERP: 100,000 watts
- HAAT: 305 meters (1,001 ft)
- Transmitter coordinates: 37.772°N 87.358°W

Links
- Website: www.hot96.com

WSTO (96.1 FM, "Hot 96") is a Top 40 radio station that serves the Evansville, Indiana; Owensboro, Kentucky; and Henderson, Kentucky, markets with a contemporary hit radio format. It is licensed to Owensboro and broadcasts from a 1,000-foot tower located midway between these cities in the Kentucky town of Hebbardsville. WSTO's studio is located at the Midwest Communications offices on Mount Auburn Road in Evansville, near the studios of WFIE.

== History ==
The Federal Communications Commission granted an application by AM radio station WVJS for a new FM radio station in Owensboro on March 24, 1947. The frequency of 96.1 MHz was assigned, and Owensboro got its first FM station on June 2, 1948, originally operating more than 18 hours a day and duplicating the AM station's output. Aside from occasional splits for specific programs, WVJS-FM continued in this role until the end of 1962, when the call letters were changed to WSTO on December 14; the station went off for equipment changes and returned on March 1, 1963, with stereo broadcasts. In September 1964, a fire tore through the portion of the WVJS-WSTO building housing all of the newly added stereo equipment; WSTO was out of service for two and a half months.

In 1980, Owensboro on the Air, the licensee of WVJS, requested to build a new tower for WSTO in Hebbardsville, which would increase the station's coverage area. Henderson County officials objected, claiming the site was too close to a proposed airport; Owensboro on the Air sued. A judge approved the tower that August and also proceeded to invalidate every zoning law Henderson County had passed dating to 1971; the chairman of the county adjustment board resigned.

The format was shifted from easy listening, used since 1963, to adult contemporary that December; when the new facility was activated in June 1982, WSTO—which claimed to be the first station to put a Grade A signal into both Owensboro and Evansville—shifted to contemporary hit radio, a format that was predicted to reach a younger and more desirable audience to advertisers. It worked: ratings increased, and in 1987, the station rated with a commanding 31.5 share among persons 12 and older, unseating Evansville's WIKY-FM as the market leader.

After V. J. Steele died, his children sold WVJS and WSTO, along with the co-owned Owensboro Cablevision cable system, to Century Communications in 1983. The radio stations were Century's first. However, Century was part-owned by Sentry Insurance, which already owned the maximum of radio properties for the time in other ventures in the Northeast, and Sentry's other partner in Century Communications, Leonard Tow, ended up owning the stations outright until Century could repurchase them in 1987.

In 1996, WSTO and its sister AM station were acquired by Brill Media, which also owned Owensboro stations WOMI and WBKR; operations began under a time brokerage agreement on December 1 until the sale closed. WBKR, a country outlet, had taken over the ratings lead in the Owensboro area specifically, leaving WSTO in second. Ratings continued to decline in the wake of the Brill purchase, as the station shifted to hot adult contemporary as "Mix 96STO".

Just as WSTO faced a challenge from WDKS, a hot AC station that retooled, Brill Media faced major financial problems. At the start of 2002, some of its bondholders filed a petition to place the company in involuntary bankruptcy. Brill then filed itself and sold WSTO to South Central Communications, the Evansville-based owner of WIKY, as a "tactical move", with Brill Media owner Alan Brill declaring that he expected to keep control of the station; this was possible because Alan Brill owned WSTO outright and not through the bankrupt company. That never occurred; Brill attempted to reorganize the company, but a federal bankruptcy judge accepted a bid by Regent Communications for the company's other 13 broadcast properties.

In 2004, the station rebranded as "Hot 96" and ultimately regained a significant market lead over WDKS. By 2020, the station had a five-share lead over its CHR competitor.

It was announced on May 28, 2014, that Midwest Communications would purchase all but one of South Central's 10 radio stations, including its Evansville–Owensboro cluster. The transaction marked the entry of Midwest Communications into the markets of Evansville, Knoxville and Nashville. The sale was finalized on September 2, 2014, at a price of $72 million.

== Personalities ==
Clay Roth & Makenzie Hart, Sarah Pepper, Tyler Foxx, R Dubb, Jay Mac, Kane Jones, Drake Meredith
