= WPSR (FM) =

Radio station in Evansville, Indiana

- Evansville, Indiana; United States
- Broadcast area: Southwestern Indiana
- Frequency: 90.7 MHz (HD Radio)
- Branding: Mix 90.7

Programming
- Format: Variety
- Subchannels: HD2: Simulcast of WSWI (alternative rock)

Ownership
- Owner: Evansville Vanderburgh School Corporation

History
- First air date: 1957
- Call sign meaning: Public Service Radio

Technical information
- Licensing authority: FCC
- Facility ID: 20032
- Class: B1
- ERP: 14,000 watts
- HAAT: 50 meters (160 ft)
- Transmitter coordinates: 38°1′45″N 87°34′42″W

Links
- Public license information: Public file; LMS
- Webcast: Listen live
- Website: www.wpsrhd.com

WPSR (90.7 FM) is a non-commercial radio station broadcasting a variety format. Licensed to Evansville, Indiana, the station is owned by the Evansville Vanderburgh School Corporation as a high school radio station. The station is also broadcast in HD Radio.

WPSR initially only broadcast from 6:45 a.m.–2:45 p.m. on school days when it went on the air in the 1950s. In the 1990s, broadcasts were expanded until midnight every night. During the non-school hours, the station would play automated 1980s music. Originally located in Evansville Central High School, the station is now a full 24/7 service broadcasting from the Southern Indiana Career & Technical Center in Evansville, Indiana.
