= WNFZ =

- Powell, Tennessee; United States
- Broadcast area: Knoxville metropolitan area
- Frequency: 94.3 MHz
- Branding: 94.3 Jack FM

Programming
- Format: Adult hits

Ownership
- Owner: Midwest Communications; (Midwest Communications, Inc.)
- Sister stations: WDKW; WIMZ-FM; WJXB-FM

History
- First air date: February 1967
- Former call signs: WATO-FM (1967–1972); WUUU (1972–1980); WETQ (1980–1985); WKNF-FM (1985–1994)
- Call sign meaning: "Ninety Four Z"

Technical information
- Licensing authority: FCC
- Facility ID: 31837
- Class: A
- ERP: 2,950 watts
- HAAT: 144 meters (472 ft)
- Transmitter coordinates: 35°57′58″N 84°04′6″W

Links
- Public license information: Public file; LMS
- Webcast: Listen Live; Listen live (via iHeartRadio)
- Website: jackfmknoxville.com

WNFZ (94.3 FM) is a commercial radio station licensed to Powell, Tennessee, and serving the Knoxville metropolitan area. WNFZ is owned by Midwest Communications. It airs an adult hits radio format, subscribing to the nationally syndicated Jack FM service.

The studios and offices are on Sharps Ridge Memorial Park Drive in Knoxville. The transmitter is on the west side of Knoxville, off Sands Road.

== History ==
=== Rock WATO-FM ===
In February 1967, the station signed on as WATO-FM. The station's city of license was originally Oak Ridge, Tennessee. At first, it simulcast co-owned WATO (1290 AM). By the late 1960s, WATO-FM began carrying a progressive rock format.

=== Easy listening, oldies, country and alternative ===
The station later changed to an easy listening format as WUUU. The slogan was "The Station For You". It was off the air for a short time until January 18, 1982, when it switched its call sign to WETQ. It carried a country music format known as "Q-94FM".

On March 25, 1985, the station changed to WKNF-FM and became "Magic 94", flipping to an oldies sound. In April 1993, it became a classic country station as "K-94".

In September 1993, the station shifted to CHR/Top 40 and changed the on-air position to "94Z". On July 1, 1994, WKNF-FM switched to WNFZ to reflect the "94Z" branding, and became an alternative rock station. Then in 2008, WNFZ refocused, becoming an active rock outlet. Between 1994 and 2013 the station was branded variously "94Z", "The Planet", "94.3 Extreme Radio" and "94-3 The X".

=== Talk and Jack FM ===
WNFZ simulcast former sister station 95.7 WVRX until October 31, 2013. At that point, The X alternative rock format moved to 95.7. At Midnight on November 1, WNFZ flipped to a talk format, formerly broadcast on WNOX. The ownership switched to Oak Ridge FM, Inc. under the branding, "KnoxTalkRadio 94.3 WNFZ". At noon on October 21, 2015, WNFZ returned to alternative rock and the "94Z" branding.

On March 21, 2019, WNFZ was sold to Midwest Communications and changed its format from alternative rock to adult hits, branded as "94.3 Jack FM". The sale closed on June 4, 2019, at a price of $2 million.
