= WLYD =

- Chandler, Indiana; United States
- Broadcast area: Evansville, Indiana
- Frequency: 93.5 MHz
- Branding: 93-5 The Lloyd

Programming
- Format: Country

Ownership
- Owner: Midwest Communications; (Midwest Communications, Inc.)
- Sister stations: WABX; WIKY-FM; WSTO

History
- First air date: 1994 (as WNTC)
- Former call signs: WNTC (1993–1996); WJPS-FM (1996–2005); WLFW (2005–2018)
- Call sign meaning: "Lloyd", from both the Lloyd Expressway and Russell G. Lloyd Sr.

Technical information
- Facility ID: 73350
- Class: A
- ERP: 3,200 watts
- HAAT: 136 meters (446 ft)
- Transmitter coordinates: 38°1′27″N 87°21′43″W

Links
- Webcast: Listen live
- Website: 935thelloyd.com

WLYD (93.5 FM) is a radio station broadcasting a country music format. Licensed to Chandler, Indiana, United States, the station serves the Evansville metropolitan area. WLYD is owned by Midwest Communications, Inc.

== History ==
As WJPS-FM, the station broadcast an oldies format until February 2005, when South Central Communications, looking to capitalize on Regent Broadcasting's change of WYNG to sports talk, converted the station to a country music format, and changed the call letters to WLFW.

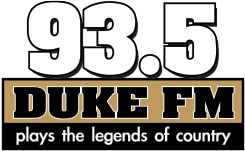
Logo as "93.5 Duke FM"

It was announced on May 28, 2014, that Midwest Communications would purchase nine of the 10 stations owned by South Central Communications, including WLFW. The sale was finalized on September 2, 2014, at a price of $72 million. On January 26, 2015, WLFW changed its format to classic country, branded as "93.5 Duke FM".

On October 2, 2018, WLFW flipped back to a more contemporary country presentation as WLYD, "93.5 The Lloyd". The station took its name from the Lloyd Expressway that runs through downtown Evansville, which itself was named after former Evansville mayor Russell G. Lloyd Sr.
