= WDKS =

Coordinates: 37°52′57″N 87°32′28″W

- Newburgh, Indiana; United States
- Broadcast area: Evansville, Indiana
- Frequency: 106.1 MHz (HD Radio)
- Branding: KISS 106

Programming
- Format: Top 40 (CHR)
- Affiliations: Compass Media Networks; Premiere Networks

Ownership
- Owner: Townsquare Media; (Townsquare Media of Evansville/Owensboro, Inc.)
- Sister stations: WBKR, WGBF, WGBF-FM, WJLT, WKDQ, WOMI

History
- First air date: November 1, 1990
- Call sign meaning: InDiana KisS

Technical information
- Licensing authority: FCC
- Facility ID: 48710
- Class: A
- ERP: 6,000 watts
- HAAT: 100 meters (330 ft)

Links
- Public license information: Public file; LMS
- Webcast: Listen Live
- Website: 1061evansville.com

WDKS (106.1 FM) is a Class A radio station licensed to Newburgh, Indiana and serving Evansville, Indiana. They are owned by Townsquare Media, which acquired the station from Clear Channel Communications in 2003.

WDKS broadcasts in HD.

== History ==
WDKS first signed on the air on November 1, 1990, as WEKX and later changed call letters to WSYZ in 1991 and WJPS in 1992. Originally an FM Talk station, they eventually switched to an Adult Top 40 format with the call letters WDKS in 1997.

Under the ownership of then-parent Clear Channel, and the direction of Program Director Jeremy 'Thompson' Fenech, WDKS switched formats to Top 40 Mainstream and was rebranded as 106.1 Kiss FM in 2001, putting them in direct competition with the more established rival WSTO. Rick Dees in the Morning replaced Bob & Sheri when Kiss 106 became KISS-FM. After Clear Channel spun WDKS and its sister stations to Regent Communications (now Townsquare Media) in 2003, Regent retained WDKS's format and the "KISS-FM" trademark.

On February 12, 2007, WDKS' musical direction initially leaned more Rhythmic, but after a month into the new direction the Pop/Rock product once again showed up on the station, only to once again move back toward a Rhythmic direction the following August. The shift to Rhythmic resulted in WDKS filling this format void in Evansville. But by March 2008, WDKS returned to a Top 40/CHR direction. The station added Kidd Kraddick's morning show in May 2008. In 2012 the Kidd Kraddick morning show was dropped, and now The Robs Radio Show with Kat Mykals runs every morning from 6 to 10AM.

Notable personalities on KISS include The Rob, Kat Mykals, Chandelle, Ryan O' Bryan, Melissa Awesome, and Nino InCognito.

== Previous logos ==
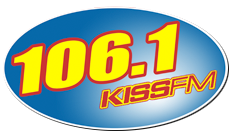
