= WPIW =

- Mount Vernon, Indiana; United States
- Broadcast area: Evansville, Indiana
- Frequency: 1590 kHz
- Branding: 98.9 WPIW

Programming
- Format: Classic country
- Affiliations: Fox News Radio

Ownership
- Owner: The Original Company, Inc
- Operator: Posey Country Radio
- Sister stations: WMVI

History
- First air date: 1955 (as WPCO)
- Former call signs: WPCO (1955–1999); WRCY (1999–2022)

Technical information
- Licensing authority: FCC
- Facility ID: 53088
- Class: D
- Power: 500 watts day 35 watts night
- Transmitter coordinates: 37°56′3.00″N 87°55′42.00″W
- Translator: 98.9 W255DQ (Poseyville)

Links
- Public license information: Public file; LMS
- Webcast: Listen Live
- Website: www.poseycountyradio.com

WPIW (1590 AM) is a radio station broadcasting a classic country format. Licensed to Mount Vernon, Indiana, United States, the station serves the Posey County area. The station is currently owned by The Original Company, Inc.

WPIW runs several sporting events, including North Posey High School football and basketball. WPIW began broadcasting in 1955 as WPCO.

On December 19, 2016, WRCY changed its format from country to sports, with programming from Fox Sports Radio.

On July 25, 2022, WRCY changed its format from sports to classic country, branded as "AM 1590 & FM 98.9 WPIW". The station changed its call letters to WPIW on September 12, 2022.
