= WGBF-FM =

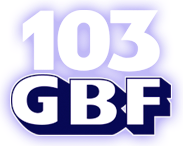
- Henderson, Kentucky; United States
- Broadcast area: Evansville metropolitan area
- Frequency: 103.1 MHz (HD Radio)
- Branding: 103 GBF

Programming
- Format: Mainstream rock

Ownership
- Owner: Townsquare Media; (Townsquare Media of Evansville/Owensboro, Inc.)
- Sister stations: WDKS; WGBF; WJLT; WKDQ

History
- First air date: December 1971
- Former call signs: WGBF-FM (1971–1979); WHKC (1979–1986)
- Call sign meaning: Taken from WGBF

Technical information
- Licensing authority: FCC
- Facility ID: 659
- Class: A
- ERP: 3,200 watts
- HAAT: 138 meters (453 ft)
- Transmitter coordinates: 37°46′54″N 87°37′24″W

Links
- Public license information: Public file; LMS
- Webcast: Listen live
- Website: www.103gbfrocks.com

WGBF-FM (103.1 FM) is a commercial radio station licensed to Henderson, Kentucky, United States, and serving the Evansville metropolitan area of Indiana and Kentucky. Owned by Townsquare Media, it carries a mainstream rock format, with studios on NW 3rd Street in Evansville.

WGBF-FM broadcasts in HD radio.

== History ==
WGBF-FM signed on the air in December 1971. In 1979, the station's call letters were changed to WHKC, calling itself "KC103". By 1984, WHKC broadcast a Top 40 (CHR) format.

The station returned to the WGBF-FM call letters in 1986 and switched to a mainstream rock format, which it still broadcasts today.

Under the ownership of Larry Aiken from 1987 to 1996, WGBF-FM was one of the first stations to broadcast the syndicated Bob & Tom Show outside of their home base of Indianapolis.
