= WIKY-FM =

Coordinates: 37.989°N 87.597°W

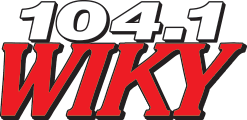
- Evansville, Indiana; United States
- Broadcast area: Evansville, Indiana
- Frequency: 104.1 MHz
- Branding: 104.1 WIKY

Programming
- Format: Adult contemporary
- Affiliations: Premiere Networks

Ownership
- Owner: Midwest Communications; (Midwest Communications, Inc.)
- Sister stations: WABX; WLYD; WSTO

History
- First air date: August 4, 1948
- Call sign meaning: Indiana, Kentucky

Technical information
- Licensing authority: FCC
- Facility ID: 61014
- Class: B
- ERP: 39,000 watts
- HAAT: 174 meters (571 ft)

Links
- Public license information: Public file; LMS
- Webcast: Listen live
- Website: www.wiky.com

WIKY-FM (104.1 MHz) is a full-service adult contemporary music radio station serving the Evansville, Indiana, radio market.

== History ==
The call letters WIKY debuted in 1948, when John A. Engelbrecht gained the Federal Communications Commission license for 820 AM. WIKY-FM signed on August 4, 1948. The studios were on the west side of Evansville, in a unique building with the studios in the basement and the Engelbrecht residence upstairs. In 1953, Engelbrecht obtained one of the first FM licenses available, at 104.1 MHz. The 820 AM frequency was sold to the University of Southern Indiana in 1981, and continues operation as WSWI. Over the next 66 years, the Engelbrecht family maintained ownership of WIKY through their company South Central Communications, which owned five stations in Evansville, as well as radio stations in Nashville and Knoxville, Tennessee, and a Muzak provider (South Central Sound).

In the most recent Arbitron ratings report, WIKY was the most-listened-to radio station in the Evansville metro survey area. WIKY has been named "Best Radio Station" by the Evansville Courier & Press "Reader's Choice" Awards the past two years, and was named "AC Station of the Year" (2008 - Markets 101+) by Radio and Records magazine.

It was announced on May 28, 2014, that Midwest Communications would purchase nine of the 10 stations owned by South Central Communications, including WIKY-FM. The sale was finalized on September 2, 2014, at a price of $72 million.
