= WGBF (AM) =

Currently silent
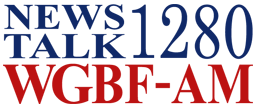
- Evansville, Indiana; United States
- Broadcast area: Evansville metropolitan area
- Frequency: 1280 kHz
- Branding: Newstalk 1280

Programming
- Format: Talk radio
- Network: Fox News Radio
- Affiliations: Compass Media Networks; Premiere Networks; Radio America; Westwood One

Ownership
- Owner: Townsquare Media; (Townsquare Media of Evansville/Owensboro, Inc.)
- Sister stations: WDKS; WGBF-FM; WJLT; WKDQ

History
- First air date: November 22, 1923
- Former call signs: WWOK (1989–1995)
- Call sign meaning: randomly assigned from a sequential list

Technical information
- Licensing authority: FCC
- Facility ID: 660
- Class: B
- Power: 5,000 watts (days); 1,000 watts (nights)
- Transmitter coordinates: 37°59′45.00″N 87°28′36.00″W

Links
- Public license information: Public file; LMS
- Webcast: Listen live
- Website: newstalk1280.com

WGBF (1280 AM) is a commercial radio station in Evansville, Indiana. The station is owned by Townsquare Media with studios on NW 3rd Street in Evansville. Until going silent in 2025, WGBF broadcast a news/talk format.

By day, WGBF is powered at 5,000 watts. To protect other stations on 1280 AM from interference, WGBF reduced power at night to 1,000 watts, using a directional antenna. It broadcast from a two-tower array near the intersection of Morgan Avenue and Burkhardt Road in Evansville. Only one tower was used for daytime non-directional operation.

== Programming ==
Most programs on WGBF were nationally syndicated shows. Weekdays on WGBF began with The Ramsey Show with Dave Ramsey. That was followed by The Glenn Beck Radio Program, The Clay Travis and Buck Sexton Show, The Sean Hannity Show, The Mark Levin Show, America at Night with Rich Valdés and Coast to Coast AM with George Noory.

The Purdue Boilermakers, Indianapolis Colts and local high school football broadcasts could also be found on WGBF. Most hours began with an update from Fox News Radio.

== History ==
WGBF signed on the air on November 22, 1923. It was owned by the Finke Furniture Company. and became a licensed facility in 1925. It was the first station in the Evansville metropolitan area.

On November 11, 1928, with the adoption of the Federal Radio Commission's General Order 40, WGBF was assigned to 630 kHz. On this new frequency it was limited to 500 watts, a fraction of its later output, and also had to share this assignment with two Missouri stations: WOS in Jefferson City (which was deleted in 1936), and KFRU in Columbia, taking turns on broadcasting programs. The studios were at 519 Vine Street. In 1940, WGBF moved to 1250 kHz, and the following March, with the implementation of the North American Regional Broadcasting Agreement (NARBA), WGBF moved to its final dial position of 1280 kHz. That allowed it to broadcast at all times, no longer sharing the frequency.

The station became an affiliate of the NBC Red Network, carrying its dramas, comedies, news and sports during the "Golden Age of Radio". It was acquired by the Leich family in the 1940s. The station was purchased by Metro Radio of Evansville, headed by Vernon Nolte, who converted the station into a Top 40 outlet in 1975.

The station changed its call sign to WWOK on October 23, 1989, following the station's purchase by Aiken Communications. Then, on August 28, 1995, the station returned to its original WGBF call letters.

In December 2025, it was announced that WGBF would be taken silent at the end of the year. The station's towers were taken down in May 2026.
