= WMEI (Puerto Rico) =

Television station in Arecibo, Puerto Rico (1997–2017)

- Arecibo; Puerto Rico
- Channels: Digital: 14 (UHF); Virtual: 14

Ownership
- Owner: Corporate Media Consultants Group, LLC; (CMCG Puerto Rico, LLC)
- Sister stations: WOST

History
- Founded: 1997
- First air date: January 1997
- Last air date: August 31, 2017
- Former channel numbers: Analog: 60 (UHF, 1997–2009); Virtual: 60 (2009–2010)
- Former affiliations: Telefe Internacional (1997–2007); Independent (2007–2009); Silent (2006–2007); AccuWeather (2009, 2011–2013); Mega TV (2009–2011); TeLe-Romántica (2013–2014); PBJ (2014–2016); Tuff TV (2014–2016); The Family Channel (2016–2017); The Action Channel (2016–2017); Retro TV (2016–2017)

Technical information
- Facility ID: 26676
- ERP: 315 kW
- HAAT: 802 m (2,631 ft)
- Transmitter coordinates: 18°09′17.1″N 66°33′16.4″W
- Translator(s): See § Satellite stations

WMEI (channel 14), branded WMEI 14 and TeleMar, was a television station licensed to Arecibo, Puerto Rico. The station was owned by Corporate Media Consultants Group, of which 51% is owned by Power Television International and 49% is owned by Max Media. WMEI's studios were located in Puerta del Condado in San Juan, with an additional studio in Yauco. The station's transmitter was located at Cerro Maravilla in Ponce. WMEI signed off the air at midnight on August 31, 2017.

== History ==
Former WMEI logo as a MegaTV affiliate between 2009 and 2011.

WMEI was founded on February 28, 1990 by locally owned Arecibo Broadcasting Systems, managed by Hector Negroni Cartagena.

On December 28, 1994, WMEI launched WWKQ-LP (channel 26), a low-power TV station in Quebradillas owned by Signal Broadcasting.

WMEI signed on as a test signal on Channel 60 in 1997 operated by Signal Broadcasting and transmitted programming from Telefe Internacional and infomercials.

WMEI also began operations for WQQZ-CA (channel 33), another channel owned by Signal Broadcasting, in Ponce on February 12, 1999.

WMEI began its regular programming in November 2006 as an affiliate of Telefe Internacional branded as Mi 60. It remained a Telefe affiliate from 2006 to 2007, showing informercials from 4 p.m. to midnight.

WMEI officially launched as an independent station on March 20, 2007 at 6:25 a.m. It was branded as TeleMar Puerto Rico from 2007 to 2009, from 2011 to 2013, and since May 11, 2014.

In March 2007, WMEI launched its digital satellite station, WOST (channel 16), in Mayagüez.

On November 23, 2009, WMEI switched its affiliation to Spanish Broadcasting System's Mega TV. Prior to this, WMEI had carried a Spanish-language version of The Local AccuWeather Channel.

WMEI, along with its satellite stations, went off the air for several months in early 2009 due to their shutting down analog signals in January 2009 in preparation for the nationwide digital transition. However, due to the transition date being delayed until June 12, 2009 (from its original February 17 date) and WTIN and WNJX-TV opting to retain their analog signals on WMEI and WOST's post transition channels until June, WMEI and WOST could not begin digital broadcasts until WTIN and WNJX terminated their analog signals in June 2009.

WMEI became an affiliate once again in February 2013, this time with TeLe-Romántica, whose programming included telenovelas, movies, series and documentaries. TeLe-Romántica resumed operations in August 2014 due to the station's website failure and moved its programming to WSJU-TV channel 31.2.

In November 2013, Power Television International acquired the non-license assets of WMEI and its satellite stations from Corporate Media Consultants Group for $18 million.

WMEI was affiliated with PBJ from 2014 to 2016.

On May 13, 2015, WQQZ-CA changed its call letters to WQQZ-CD after switching from analog to digital operation.

On January 12, 2016, WMEI, WOST and its satellite stations sold their spectrum and participated in the 2016 FCC Spectrum auction (originally scheduled for sometime in 2015, then pushed back a year). The executive officers said that once the auction was complete, the station would either go off the air or move to another channel.

On April 1, 2016, WMEI changed its branding to reflect the station's digital channel number. It was now known as WMEI 14. The station switched its affiliation to Retro Television Network and broadcast daily from 5 a.m. to 6 p.m. No programming changes were expected, and WMEI remained a Tuff TV affiliate. The station also affiliated with Gun TV upon that network's launch the same day. Gun TV broadcast from 12AM to 5AM daily.

WMEI was most recently an affiliate of Tuff TV and The Family Channel, while WOST remained an affiliate of the Spanish version of The Local AccuWeather Channel.

On October 18, 2016, WOST went off the air. Station engineers had determined that one of the station's power amplifiers had been damaged during a thunderstorm. The station was awaiting the delivery of parts to complete the repair to the power supply. It was expected that it might be another couple of weeks before the repairs were to be completed.

The licensee requested Special Temporary Authority pursuant to FCC Rule 73.1635(a)(4), as the circumstances of the storm were beyond the control of the licensee and it was acting diligently to repair the station and restore operations but had to wait on vendors to deliver equipment. The licensee also requested a one-day waiver of the 30-day filing deadline to request silent authority. The 30th day for filing the silent STA request was miscalculated. The LMS form would not allow the proper date to be checked that the station went off the air.

On November 11, 2016, licensed as a digital operation, WWKQ-LP changed its callsign to WWKQ-LD.

On December 5, 2016, WQQZ-CD went off the air because of a malfunction with its Ktech receiver. It was repaired over the next few weeks. On December 8, 2016, WQQZ-CD returned to the air broadcasting the full Retro TV and Action Channel programming.

In April 2017, WMEI announced that it would shut down on August 31 following the Federal Communications Commission (FCC)'s incentive auction. The station sold its spectrum for $9,696,619. Also, WOST would move their channel positions to channel 20, and WQQZ-CD to channel 16.

On May 2, 2017, WOST resumed broadcasting operations with a reduced power of 2 kW.

Due to the passage of Hurricane Irma across Puerto Rico, the license for WMEI was cancelled on September 12, 2017. The WMEI unit was moved to WOST and satellite stations.

== Subchannels ==
The station's digital signal was multiplexed:

Subchannels of WMEI
Channel	Res.	Short name	Programming
14.1	480i	WMEI-DT	Main WMEI programming / Retro TV (5 a.m.–6 p.m.) / The Action Channel (6 p.m.–5 a.m.) (4:3)
14.2	480i	WMEI-DT2	The Family Channel (4:3)

== Satellite stations ==
WMEI was rebroadcast on the following stations:

Station	City of license	Channels TV (RF)	First air date	ERP	HAAT	Facility ID	Transmitter Coordinates
WOST	Mayagüez	20 (14)	March 20, 2007	95 kW	606.7 m	60357	18°18′51″N 67°11′24″W
WWKQ-LD	Quebradillas	14 (19)	December 28, 1994	2.48 kW	163.7 m	60369	18°28′53″N 66°55′36″W
WQQZ-CD	Ponce	14 (24)	February 12, 1999	0.75 kW	613 m	32142	18°04′50″N 66°44′47″W
