= WOST =

Television station in Mayagüez, Puerto Rico

- Mayagüez; Puerto Rico
- Channels: Digital: 20 (UHF); Virtual: 14

Programming
- Affiliations: see § Subchannels

Ownership
- Owner: Innovate Corp.; (HC2 Station Group, Inc.)
- Sister stations: W20EJ-D

History
- First air date: March 20, 2007
- Former channel numbers: Digital: 22 (UHF, 2007–2018); Virtual: 16 (2009–2010)
- Former affiliations: Independent (2007–2009, satellite of WMEI); AccuWeather (2009, 2011–2013); MegaTV (2009–2011); TeLe-Romántica (2013–2014); PBJ (2014–2016); Tuff TV (2014–2016); Gun TV (2016−2017); Retro TV (2016–2018); The Action Channel (2016–2018); Azteca America (2018–2022); ShopHQ (2021–2025); Infomercials (2025)

Technical information
- Licensing authority: FCC
- Facility ID: 60357
- ERP: 95.1 kW
- HAAT: 606.7 m (1,990 ft)
- Transmitter coordinates: 18°18′51″N 67°11′24″W
- Translator(s): see § Satellite stations

Links
- Public license information: Public file; LMS

WOST (channel 14) is a television station licensed to Mayagüez, Puerto Rico. Owned by Innovate Corp., the station maintains studios in Puerta del Condado in San Juan, with additional studios in Yauco. The transmitter is situated in Monte del Estado in Maricao.

The station's signal is relayed throughout Puerto Rico through low-power translators WWKQ-LD (digital channel 34, virtual channel 14) in Quebradillas, WQQZ-CD (digital channel 24, virtual channel 14) in Ponce and W27DZ-D (digital channel 27, virtual channel 14) in Mayaguez.

Until August 31, 2017, the station was a satellite of the now-defunct WMEI in Arecibo. The station was previously owned by Corporate Media Consultants Group, LLC, which 51% was owned by Power Television International and 49% was owned by Max Media. On August 29, 2018, the station was purchased by HC2 Holdings for $2,850,000. The sale was completed on January 22, 2019. Upon completion of the sale, the station became an Azteca owned and operated station. On September 1, 2021, WOST and its satellite stations switched to with home shopping network ShopHQ.

== History ==
In March 2007, WOST signed on the air as a digital-only television station in Mayagüez, and served as a satellite station of WMEI in Arecibo.

WOST switched affiliations becoming an affiliate of Spanish Broadcasting System's Mega TV on November 23, 2009; the Mega TV affiliation was previously on WSJU-TV. Prior to this, WOST had carried a Spanish-language version of The Local AccuWeather Channel.

WOST, along with WMEI and its satellite stations, was off the air for several months in early 2009. This was due to WMEI and WOST having shut down their analog signals in January 2009 to prepare for the digital transition. However, due to the transition date being delayed until June 12, 2009 (from its original February 17 date) and WTIN and WNJX-TV opting to retain their analog signals on WMEI and WOST's post transition channels until June, WMEI and WOST could not begin digital broadcasts until WTIN and WNJX terminated their analog signals.

WOST became affiliated once again in February 2013, this time with TeLe-Romántica. The network resumed operations in August 2014 due to the station's website failure, and moved its programming to WSJU-TV channel 31.2.

In November 2013, Power Television International acquired the non-license assets of WMEI & its Satellite Stations from Corporate Media Consultants Group for $18 million.

WOST was affiliated with PBJ from 2014 to 2016.

On January 12, 2016, WMEI, WOST and its satellite stations sold its spectrum, and participated in the 2016 FCC Spectrum auction (originally scheduled for sometime in 2015, then pushed back a year). The officers said that once the auction is complete, the station would go off the air, or moving to another channel.

On April 1, 2016, WOST changed its branding, reflecting on the station's digital channel number. Also, WOST switched affiliations to Retro Television Network, and broadcast daily from 5 a.m. to 6 p.m. No programming changes were expected, and WOST retained as a Tuff TV affiliate. Also, the station affiliated with Gun TV upon that network's launch the same day. Gun TV broadcast from midnight to 5 a.m. daily.

WMEI was most recently an affiliate of Tuff TV & The Family Channel, while WOST remained an affiliate of the Spanish version of The Local AccuWeather Channel.

On October 18, 2016, WOST went off the air as stated in the form. Station engineers had determined that one of the station’s power amplifiers was damaged during a thunder storm. The station was awaiting the delivery of parts to complete the repair to the power supply. It was expected that it might be another couple of weeks before the repairs were to be completed.

The licensee respectfully requested Special Temporary Authority pursuant to FCC Rule 73.1635(a)(4). The circumstances of the storm were beyond the control of the licensee. It was acting diligently to repair the station to restore operations but had to wait on vendors to deliver equipment.

The licensee also requested a one-day waiver of the 30-day filing deadline to request silent authority. The 30th day for filing the silent STA request was miscalculated. The LMS form would not allow the proper date to be checked that the station went off the air.

On November 11, 2016, WWKQ-LP changed its callsign to WWKQ-LD licensed, as digital operation.

In April 2017, WMEI announced that it would shut down on August 31, following the Federal Communications Commission (FCC)'s incentive auction. The station sold its spectrum for $9,696,619. Also, WOST would move their channel positions to channel 20, and WQQZ-CD to channel 16.

On May 2, 2017, WOST resumed broadcasting operations with a reduced power of 2 kW.

On September 12, 2017, the WMEI license was cancelled. The WMEI intellectual unit was moved to WOST and satellite stations. Also, the station switched with Azteca America on August 1, 2018. On September 1, 2021, WOST and its satellite stations switched to ShopHQ. The Azteca America affiliation moved to the second digital subchannel. Upon ShopHQ's shutdown on April 17, the station switched to paid programming. Then the station flipped to Aqui TV.

== Technical information ==
=== Subchannels ===
The station's signal is multiplexed:

Subchannels of WOST, WWKQ-LD, W27DZ-D, and WQQZ-CD
Subchannel	Res.	Short name	Programming
14.1	720p	WOST-DT	Aqui TV
14.2	480i	WOST-DT	Infomercials
14.3	480i	WOST-DT	Infomercials
14.4	480i	WOST-DT	Infomercials
14.5	480i	WOST-DT	Infomercials
14.6	QVC en Español	WOST-DT	

== Translators ==
WOST rebroadcasts on the following stations:

Station	City of license	Channel; TV (RF)	Facility ID	ERP	HAAT	Transmitter Coordinates	First air date
WWKQ-LD	Quebradillas	34 (14)	60369	2.5 kW	64 m (210 ft)	18°28′45.7″N 66°55′34.6″W	December 28, 1994
WQQZ-CD	Ponce	24 (14)	32142	15 kW	203.2 m (667 ft)	18°4′38.8″N 66°45′1.6″W	February 12, 1999
W20EJ-D	San Juan	20 (26)	125192	15 kW	277.6 m (911 ft)	18°16′25″N 66°5′40″W	May 26, 2006
W27DZ-D	Mayaguez	27 (14)	125245	1 kW	149.1 m (489 ft)	18°13′39.1″N 67°6′35.2″W	December 14, 2006
