= WNIN =

WNIN may refer to:

- WNIN (TV), a television station (channel 9 digital) licensed to Evansville, Indiana, United States
- WNIN-FM, a radio station (88.3 FM) licensed to Evansville, Indiana, United States
