= K30RF-D =

Television station in Wichita, Kansas

- Wichita, Kansas; United States
- Channels: Digital: 30 (UHF); Virtual: 30

Programming
- Affiliations: 30.1: Heartland; for others, see § Subchannels

Ownership
- Owner: Get After It Media; (Digital Networks–Wichita, LLC)
- Operator: Great Plains Television

History
- First air date: 1992
- Former call signs: K51DN (1990–1995); KSMI-LP (1995–2010); KSMI-LD (2010–2026)
- Former channel numbers: Analog: 51 (UHF, 1990–2010); Digital: 51 (UHF, 2010–2013)
- Former affiliations: Telemundo; Azteca América

Technical information
- Licensing authority: FCC
- Facility ID: 56518
- Class: LD
- ERP: 15 kW
- HAAT: 272.5 m (894 ft)
- Transmitter coordinates: 37°48′0.7″N 97°31′30.2″W

Links
- Public license information: LMS
- Website: www.kagwtv.com

K30RF-D (channel 30) is a low-power television station in Wichita, Kansas, United States, affiliated with several digital multicast networks. It is owned by Get After It Media and operated by Great Plains Television alongside KAGW-CD (channel 26). The two stations share offices on South Greenwood Street in Wichita; K30RF-D's transmitter is located in rural northwestern Sedgwick County (north-northeast of Colwich).

== History ==
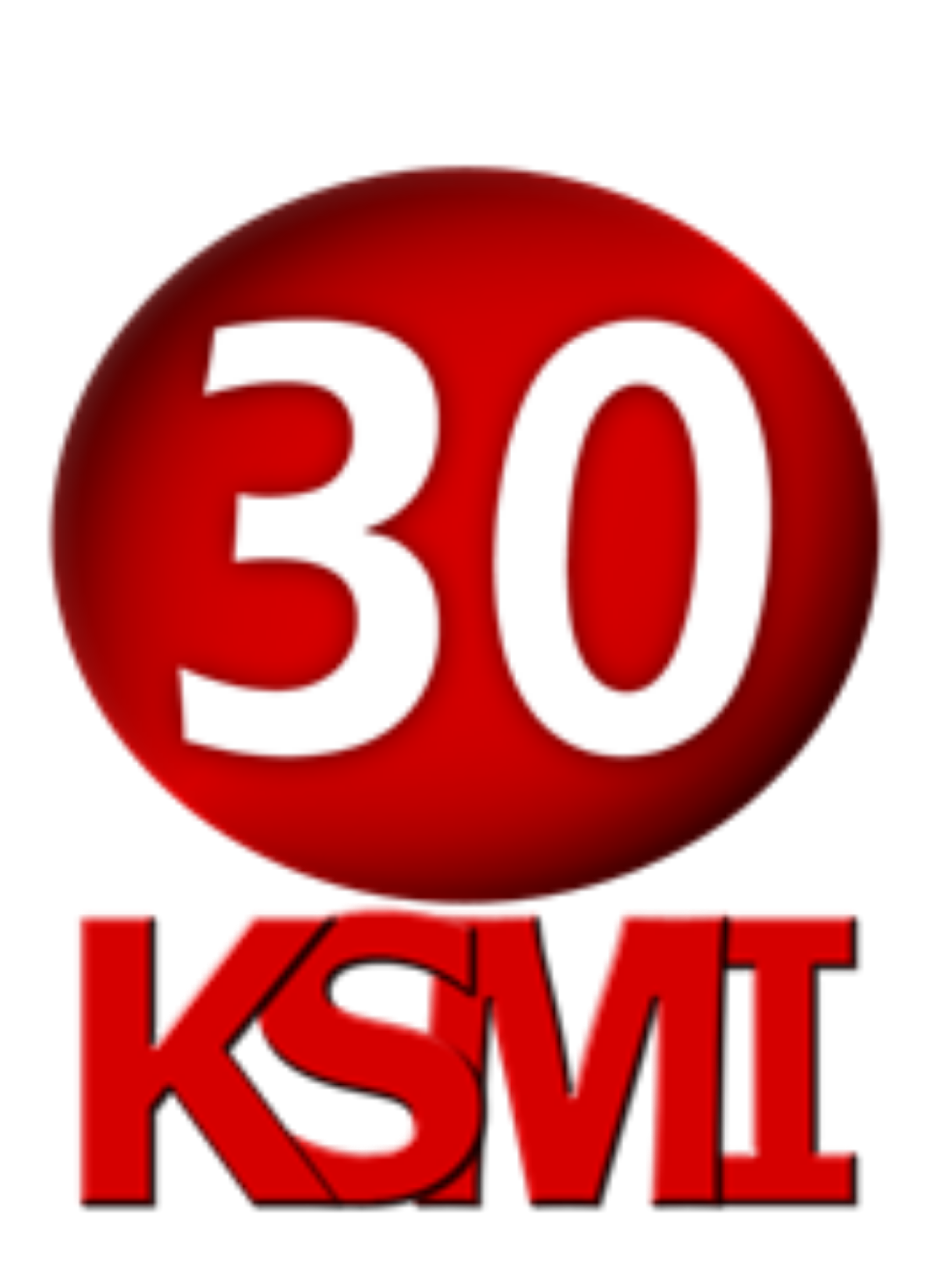
Former KSMI-LD logo used from 2013 until 2018.

Channel 51 first signed on in the Wichita area as K51DN "KDN-TV" in late 1992. It was one of two low-power TV stations started by Wichita-based River City Broadcasting (the other station being KCTU-LP) and served as an over-the-air subscription TV station for the Playboy Channel. During the daytime hours, the Cable Video Store movie service was added. On June 14, 1993, it added a separate pay service: the Sci-Fi Channel, a national cable service that was not being carried by Wichita's cable system, replacing Cable Video Store. By this time, there were 200 Playboy subscribers.

In the early 2000s, KSMI-LP became an affiliate of the Spanish-language network Telemundo after previously airing Bloomberg Television, World Harvest Television, and the America One Television Network; it switched to the Hispanic Television Network in 2001, and after that network filed for bankruptcy, KSMI affiliated in 2002 with Azteca América. The next year, it introduced a local newscast, Hechos Wichita—the first Spanish-language local news in the market.

Luken Communications purchased the station in 2010 and entered into a local marketing agreement with Great Plains Television Network, LLC to manage the station; that year, the station flash cut its digital signal into operation on UHF channel 51. Luken also began providing the station with affiliations from the company's various networks.

On October 17, 2013, KSMI-LP began transmitting its digital signal (which moved to UHF channel 30) from a new, taller tower near Colwich and increased its effective radiated power to 15 kilowatts.

On February 23, 2026, an FCC rule change required stations licensed as broadcast translators and not low-power TV stations, including this one, to be assigned translator-type call signs. As a result, this station was changed to K30RF-D.

== Subchannels ==
The station's signal is multiplexed:

Subchannels of K30RF-D
Subchannel	Res.	Short name	Programming
30.1	720p	HRTLAND	Heartland
30.2	480i	RTV	Retro TV (4:3)
30.3	480i	Hasbro	Hasbro Legends
30.4	480i	REVACT	Rev'n Action (4:3)
30.5	480i	Family	The Family Channel (4:3)
30.6	480i	Revival	Revival TV (4:3)
30.7	480i	GLTVii	Greater Love TV (4:3)
