= WOOT-LD =

Television station in Chattanooga, Tennessee

- Chattanooga, Tennessee; United States
- Channels: Digital: 19 (UHF); Virtual: 6

Programming
- Affiliations: 6.1: Heartland; for others, see § Subchannels

Ownership
- Owner: Get After It Media; (Digital Networks-Southeast, LLC)

History
- Founded: January 16, 1981
- First air date: May 25, 1987
- Former call signs: W67BD (1985–1988); W06BG (1988–2000); WOOT-LP (2000–2015)
- Former channel numbers: Analog: 67 (UHF, 1985–1988), 6 (VHF, 1988–2011); Digital: 31 (UHF, 2011−2012), 38 (UHF, 2013−2019)
- Former affiliations: Independent (via WFLI-TV, 1987−1995); UPN (via WFLI-TV 1995−2000); Dark (2000−2007); Retro TV (January−December 2012; now on 6.2)

Technical information
- Licensing authority: FCC
- Facility ID: 31862
- Class: LD
- ERP: 15 kW
- HAAT: 269.1 m (883 ft)
- Transmitter coordinates: 35°12′26″N 85°16′52″W

Links
- Public license information: LMS

WOOT-LD (channel 6) is a low-power television station in Chattanooga, Tennessee, United States. The station is the flagship of the Get After It Media group.

== History ==
WOOT was a translator of WFLI-TV until it went silent in 2000 due to technical issues. Afterwards, UPN was picked up part-time by WYHB-CA (later a full-time America One affiliate), then by CBS affiliate WDEF-TV in 2004 as a secondary affiliation.

While WOOT-LP was still silent, its license was upgraded to Class A status. The station apparently returned to the air in late-2007.

Chattanooga-based Luken Communications acquired WOOT-LP from its previous owner, Tiger Eye Broadcasting Corporation, in 2010.

Luken took the analog channel 6 signal off the air on November 2, 2011, so that it could flash-cut it to digital on channel 31. The digital channel took the call sign WOOT-LD on December 19, 2011, and signed on in early 2012 via special temporary authority (STA) as Chattanooga's new Retro Television Network (RTV) owned-and-operated station (prior to the beginning of 2012, WRCB-DT2 served as Chattanooga's RTV affiliate until it dropped RTV in favor of a competing retro network, Antenna TV). It added five subchannels–all carrying networks that are at least partially owned by Luken.

WOOT's license was initially canceled on December 5, 2012, after its analog signal was dark for over a year. However, Luken filed a petition for reconsideration, stating that its digital signal has been in operation since January 2012. As a result, the WOOT license was reinstated. In addition, Luken requested, and was granted, a request to surrender the station's Class A status; therefore, it has reverted to low-power status. It also had a construction permit to move its digital signal, which formerly operated on RF channel 31 under STA, to RF channel 38.

== Subchannels ==
The station's signal is multiplexed:

Subchannels of WOOT-LD
Subchannel	Res.	Short name	Programming
6.1	720p	WOOT-LD	Heartland
6.2	480i	RTV	Retro TV (4:3)
6.3	480i	Hasbro	Hasbro Legends (4:3)
6.4	480i	REVACT	Rev'n Action (4:3)
6.5	480i	Family	The Family Channel (4:3)
6.6	1080i	Revival	Revival TV
6.7	720p	GLTVii	Greater Love TV
