= Willard Carpenter House =

Historic house in Indiana, United States

- U.S. National Register of Historic Places
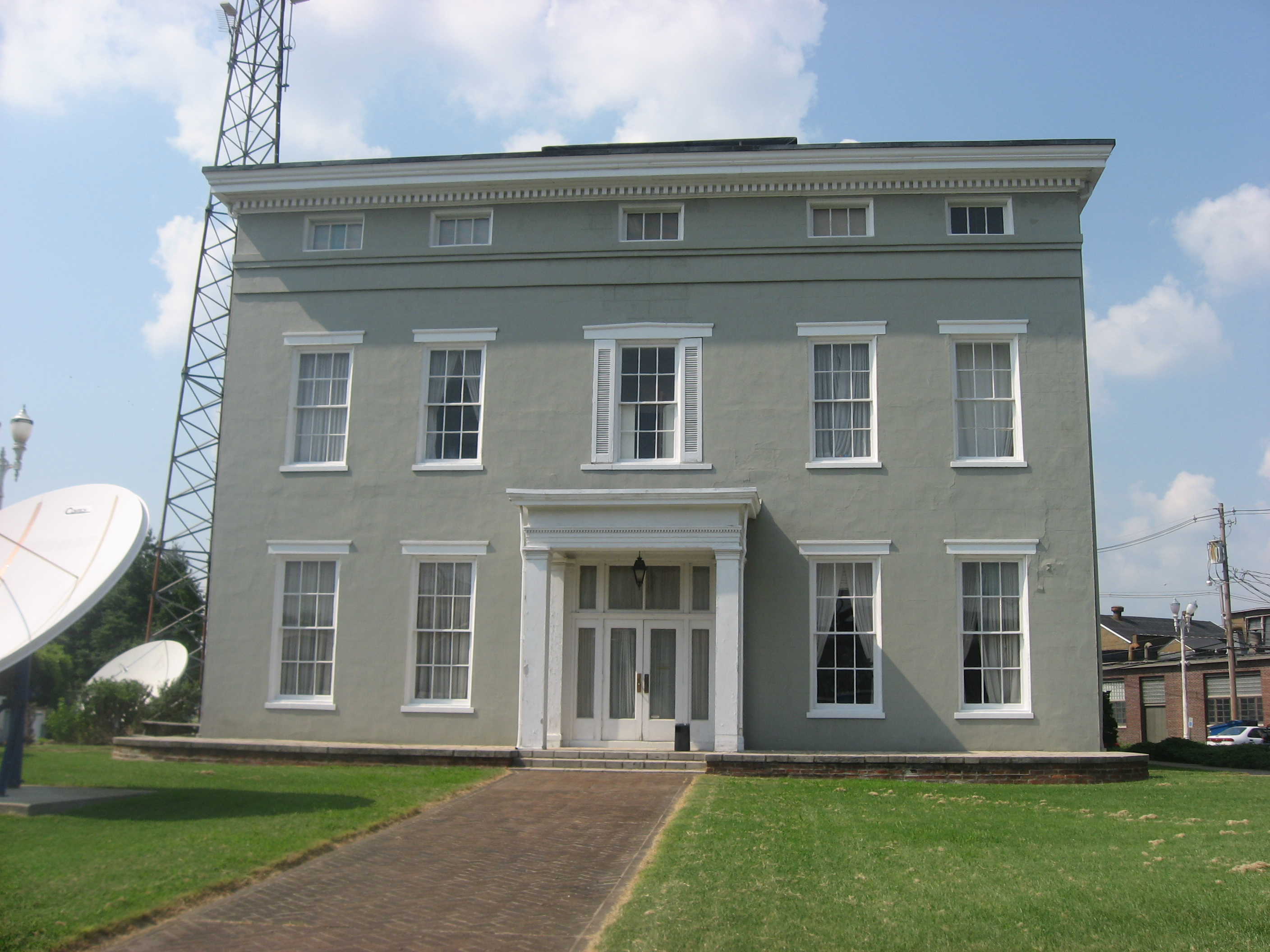
- Willard Carpenter House, July 2011

- Location within Indiana Location within the United States
- Location: 405 Carpenter St., Evansville, Indiana
- Coordinates: 37°58′30″N 87°34′32″W
- Area: 1 acre (0.40 ha)
- Built: 1848
- Architectural style: Greek Revival
- NRHP reference No.: 78000057
- Added to NRHP: February 10, 1978

The Willard Carpenter House, located at 405 Carpenter Street in downtown Evansville, Indiana, is one of two landmarks recognized as memorials to one of the city's most influential pioneers, philanthropist Willard Carpenter. The other is Willard Library, which he built, endowed and gave to the people of the area. Willard Carpenter, born on March 15, 1803, at Strafford, Orange County, Vermont, was a son of Willard Sr. and Polly (Bacon) Carpenter, and a descendant of the Rehoboth Carpenter family.

Construction on Willard Carpenter's house began in 1848 and was completed in 1849. It was built in the Greek Revival style.

The home passed from Carpenter ownership during the Great Depression to Funkhouser American Legion Post. In 1956, they sold the property to WTVW. Medco purchased the mansion in 1974 and restored the home to as close to original condition as possible. Medco stayed in the home until 1985, when it was purchased by WNIN (TV). It now also houses the offices of WNIN-FM.

It was added to the National Register of Historic Places in 1978.
