= KGPT =

KGPT may refer to:

- KAGW-CD, a television station (channel 24, virtual 26) licensed to Wichita, Kansas, United States, which held the call sign KGPT-LD or KGPT-CD from 2012 to 2021
- the ICAO code for Gulfport–Biloxi International Airport
