= WTSN-CD =

Television station in Evansville, Indiana

- Evansville, Indiana; United States
- Channels: Digital: 20 (UHF); Virtual: 20

Programming
- Affiliations: 20.1: Antenna TV; 20.2: Heartland

Ownership
- Owner: Three Sisters Broadcasting, LLC
- Sister stations: WYYW-CD

History
- Founded: September 22, 2011
- First air date: November 2011
- Former call signs: WYYW-LD (September 2011−April 2012); WYYW-CD (April−December 2012)
- Former affiliations: MeTV (November 2011–2014); Heroes & Icons (2014−2019)

Technical information
- Licensing authority: FCC
- Facility ID: 189735
- Class: CD
- ERP: 15 kW
- HAAT: 160.8 m (528 ft)
- Transmitter coordinates: 37°59′13″N 87°16′11″W

Links
- Public license information: Public file; LMS
- Website: www.wtsn-tristate.com/wtsn-cd/

WTSN-CD (channel 20) is a low-power, Class A television station in Evansville, Indiana, United States, affiliated with Antenna TV. The station is owned by Three Sisters Broadcasting alongside Telemundo affiliate WYYW-CD (channel 15).

== History ==
WAZE-TV originally broadcast its digital signal on UHF channel 20 just before that station shut down permanently in 2011.

The low-power channel 20 was founded on September 22, 2011, as WYYW-CD, and became a MeTV affiliate two months later. This happened three weeks after CBS affiliate WEVV-TV began broadcasting Fox network programming on its second digital subchannel.

On December 12, 2012, WYYW-CD and WTSN-CD swapped call signs. The original WTSN-CD became WYYW-CD, while the original WYYW-CD became WTSN-CD.

The station became a Heroes & Icons (H&I) affiliate on October 23, 2014, while MeTV relocated to WFIE-DT3; five days later, MeTV moved to WFIE-DT2. Then on January 17, 2015, WTSN replaced its H&I affiliation with Heartland's E/I programming repeats from its sister station on Saturday mornings because of its Sunday religious and local programming up until the Heartland affiliation with WYYW-CD ended.

On October 25, 2019, WTSN dropped the H&I affiliation, replacing it with Antenna TV.

== Subchannels ==
The station's signal is multiplexed:

Subchannels of WTSN-CD
Subchannel	Res.	Short name	Programming
20.1	480i	WTSN-1	Antenna TV (4:3)
20.2	480i	WTSN-2	Heartland (4:3)
