= Hasbro Legends =

American over-the-air television network

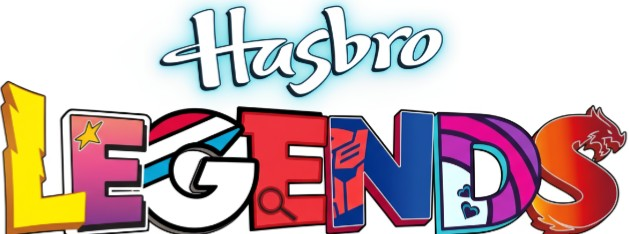
- Type: Digital broadcast television network
- Country: United States
- Broadcast area: Nationwide, via OTA digital TV (coverage 50.28%)
- Headquarters: Chattanooga, Tennessee

Programming
- Language: English
- Picture format: 1080p (HDTV master feed); (otherwise 480i SDTV widescreen on subchannel affiliates)

Ownership
- Owner: Get After It Media
- Parent: Get After It Media
- Sister channels: Heartland; Retro TV; The Family Channel; Rev'n Action

History
- Launched: July 13, 2026; 2 months ago

Links
- Webcast: Watch live

Hasbro Legends is an American digital broadcast television network and FAST channel owned by Get After It Media with programming from Hasbro Entertainment.

== History ==
On October 7, 2025, Hasbro Entertainment announced plans to expand their free ad-supported streaming television lineup with several new channels. One of them, named Hasbro Legends, was intended to showcase a variety of the company's properties, with a focus on "classic TV and anime-inspired content". The channel was intended to debut in the fourth quarter of that year, with it launching on Plex in December and Amazon Prime Video in January.

Hasbro announced a partnership with Get After It Media on April 13, 2026, to launch the service as a digital broadcast television network. Get After It would manage distribution and ad sales, while Hasbro would provide programming. Upon launch, Get After It claimed Hasbro Legends would be available in over 70 million households, with additional distribution through the company's then upcoming Heartland+ streaming portal.

After soft-launching on Get After It's owned stations in late June and upon Heartland+'s debut on July 2, Hasbro Legends officially launched as a broadcast network on July 13, 2026. The formal launch coincided with the network gaining affiliate carriage on stations owned by HC2 Holdings.

== Programming ==
Hasbro Legends' schedule consists of a collection of film and television content from the Hasbro Entertainment library, including various entries from the Duel Masters, G.I. Joe (including G.I. Joe: The Movie), My Little Pony (including the first generation series, My Little Pony: The Movie from 1986 and My Little Pony Tales), Power Rangers (including the Mighty Morphin Power Rangers: Once & Always special) and Transformers franchises.

== See also ==
- Discovery Family - a cable television channel co-owned by Warner Bros. Discovery Global Linear Networks and Hasbro Entertainment
- PBJ - a similar digital broadcast television network operated by what is now Get After It Media in conjunction with Classic Media
