= Health Beauty Life =

Lifestyle media outlet

- Industry: Lifestyle media
- Founded: 2010 in Oceanside, United States
- Founder: Patrick Dockry

Health Beauty Life is a lifestyle media outlet that offers print, video, online, and emerging media with content about health, beauty, fashion, fitness, travel, and non-profit charity organizations, as well as other topics of interest. Founded by Publisher, Executive Producer, and Host Patrick Dockry, Health Beauty Life was established in 2010 in Oceanside, California.

== Magazine ==
Health Beauty Life Magazine is a quarterly lifestyle magazine that's nationally distributed in print and available globally through HealthBeautyLife.com. The print magazine has a distribution of 80,000, with 50,000 certified direct mail, and 30,000 hand delivered nationwide. It is distributed to salons, spas and medical professional waiting rooms nationwide, and can be found on the newsstands of various national retailers such as Barnes & Noble and Books-A-Million. The print magazine features interactive QR coded articles that correspond with television episodes and video elements on HealthBeautyLife.com. The magazine's total reach is over 10 million readers. Past issues of the publication can be found online at ISSUU on the Health Beauty Life Magazine page.

Issue	Cover
Fall 2010	Style Stars
Winter 2011	Brande Roderick
Summer 2011	Gretchen Christine Rossi
Winter 2011	Nicole Scherzinger
Spring 2012	Fran Drescher
Summer 2012	Mario Lopez
Winter 2013	Kathy Ireland
Summer 2013	Lilly Ghalichi
Fall 2013	Tony Horton
Winter 2014	Ed Begley Jr.
Spring 2014	Adrienne Janic & Eugenia Kuzmina
Summer 2014	Carol Alt
Fall 2014	Kelly Emberg
Spring 2015	Karina Smirnoff

== Online ==
HealthBeautyLife.com is the companion site to Health Beauty Life Magazine, and network series, Health Beauty Life with Patrick Dockry.

== Television ==
Health Beauty Life with Patrick Dockry is a television series featuring a mix of celebrity interviews, getaway travel, healthy cooking, fitness, beauty, fashion, and lifestyle segments, all hosted by Producer, Patrick Dockry. This 13-episode, ½-hour weekly series formerly aired on WE tv and Tuff TV, and can now be found on the Family Channel. Local listing can be found at TV Guide.

Season	Original Air Date
Season 1	September 2012
Season 2	September 2013
Season 3	January 2014
