= WTVW =

Television station in Evansville, Indiana

- Evansville, Indiana; Henderson–Owensboro, Kentucky; United States
- City: Evansville, Indiana
- Channels: Digital: 22 (UHF); Virtual: 7
- Branding: CW7 Evansville; Eyewitness News

Programming
- Affiliations: 7.1: The CW; for others, see § Subchannels

Ownership
- Owner: Mission Broadcasting, Inc.
- Operator: Nexstar Media Group
- Sister stations: WEHT

History
- First air date: August 21, 1956
- Former channel numbers: Analog: 7 (VHF, 1956–2009); Digital: 28 (UHF, 2001–2019)
- Former affiliations: ABC (1956–1995); Fox (1995–2011); Independent (2011–2013); MeTV (secondary, 2011–2013)
- Call sign meaning: No meaning

Technical information
- Licensing authority: FCC
- Facility ID: 3661
- ERP: 1,000 kW
- HAAT: 300.5 m (986 ft)
- Transmitter coordinates: 38°1′26.8″N 87°21′43.3″W

Links
- Public license information: Public file; LMS
- Website: www.tristatehomepage.com

WTVW (channel 7) is a television station in Evansville, Indiana, United States, airing programming from The CW. It is owned by Mission Broadcasting and operated by Nexstar Media Group alongside ABC affiliate WEHT (channel 25). The two stations share studios and transmitter locations on Marywood Drive in Henderson, Kentucky.

Before joining The CW, WTVW was the market's Fox affiliate from December 3, 1995, to June 30, 2011 (serving as an independent station after disaffiliating from the network until January 30, 2013); before that, it served as Evansville's original ABC affiliate from its August 21, 1956, sign-on to December 2, 1995.

== History ==
=== As an ABC affiliate ===
WTVW began operations on August 21, 1956, as an ABC affiliate locally owned by Evansville Television, Inc. and operating on VHF channel 7. It was Evansville's third television station, and the first on the VHF band. In its early years on the air, WTVW fought an attempt by the Federal Communications Commission (FCC) to deintermix the market, which would have moved the station to UHF channel 31 (which would have resulted in Evansville having only one VHF allocation on channel 9; its rivals, WEHT and WFIE, had operated on UHF since their inceptions in 1953) and reallocated channel 7 to Louisville, Kentucky. The station's original studio facilities were located on Carpenter Street in downtown Evansville.

Evansville Television went into bankruptcy in 1959, putting WTVW in the hands of a trustee; in 1962, the station was acquired by Polaris Corporation, which merged with Natco Corp., a subsidiary of Fuqua Industries, in 1966. Fuqua decided to leave broadcasting in 1979; the following year, WTVW was purchased by Charles Woods, owner of WTVY-FM-TV in Dothan, Alabama. Banam Broadcasting, a subsidiary of BankAmerica, assumed ownership of the station in 1993.

=== Switch to Fox ===
Banam sold WTVW to Petracom Broadcasting in May 1995. A 20-percent equity stake in Petracom was purchased by Fox soon afterward, eventually leading to a three-way affiliation swap in which WTVW ended its 39-year affiliation with ABC and joined Fox on December 3, 1995, with ABC moving to former CBS affiliate WEHT and CBS moving to former Fox affiliate WEVV-TV. The affiliation switch made WTVW one of three original ABC affiliates in the state of Indiana to have switched affiliation to Fox, the other two being WAWV-TV in Terre Haute and WSJV in South Bend.

Petracom sold its stations to Quorum Broadcasting in 1997. Quorum attempted to sell WTVW to GNS Media in 2003; GNS was owned by former Liberty Corporation executive Neil Smith, and if the deal went through WTVW would have been operated under a joint sales agreement by Liberty-owned WFIE. In the meantime, on December 31, 2003, Quorum merged with Nexstar Broadcasting, which announced in January 2004 that the sale to GNS had fallen through.

=== Post-Fox affiliation ===
Logo used from 2011 to 2019, under the WTVW Local 7 branding. The CW logo was added in 2013.

On May 11, 2011, Fox announced that it would drop its affiliation with WTVW and affiliate with a subchannel of WEVV-TV that already carried programming from MyNetworkTV, effective July 1 (WEVV's main channel remained with CBS)—in effect, resulting in Fox returning to its original affiliate in Evansville. The move came as Fox aggressively sought a higher share of retransmission consent earnings gained by its affiliates as part of affiliation agreements, an approach that openly irked WTVW owner Nexstar Broadcasting Group. Nexstar would subsequently be stripped of its Fox affiliations in Springfield, Missouri (KSFX-TV), and Fort Wayne (WFFT-TV) as well, and Nexstar decided to drop the Fox affiliation from its Terre Haute affiliate (WFXW), which would regain its former ABC affiliation under the new callsign WAWV-TV.

WTVW became an independent station on July 1, 2011, as WEVV-DT2 took the Fox affiliation; rebranded as Local 7, the station replaced Fox prime time shows with syndicated programming on weeknights, westerns on Saturdays and movies on Sundays. WTVW would also introduce increased local programming, including coverage of local high school and college sports. The shift made Evansville one of the only television markets in the United States with only four out of the six broadcast networks (ABC, CBS, NBC and The CW) having primary affiliations in a five-station market, with the remaining two (Fox and MyNetworkTV) as digital multicast channels, along with one of the few markets where an analog-era VHF station had no network affiliation while all the market's UHF stations did.

The Western programming, as well as other classic television programs that were part of the overnight schedule, were provided by Weigel Broadcasting's MeTV, which mainly airs on digital subchannels in most of the network's markets, though WTVW ran programming recorded from the network's national feed to be aired later in the station's schedule to compensate for current-day syndication rights. Although WTSN-CD became a full MeTV affiliate in November 2011, WTVW continued to air these programs until January 31, 2013 (though the amount of MeTV programming seen on the station was reduced in September 2012), and MeTV continues to list WTVW as carrying a partial schedule.

On August 8, 2011, Nexstar announced it would purchase WEHT from Gilmore Broadcasting Corporation while selling WTVW to Nexstar's sister company Mission Broadcasting (which then began operating WTVW under a shared services agreement), effectively placing WTVW under the co-management of the station that accepted the ABC affiliation that WTVW formerly carried prior to affiliating with Fox. As a result, Nexstar moved WTVW's operations into the WEHT studios in Henderson, Kentucky. Under the SSA, FCC filings by Nexstar placed a limit on the amount of news programming seen on WTVW's overall schedule to 15% (equivalent to 25 hours per week). News amounted to 21% of the station's schedule due to the expansions of its weekday morning and weekend 6 p.m. newscasts, WTVW eliminated newscasts seen in time periods where WEHT aired their own newscasts in order to comply. The transactions were completed on December 1, 2011.

=== CW affiliation ===
On January 28, 2013, Mission Broadcasting announced that WTVW would become the new CW affiliate for the Tri-State area effective January 31. The affiliation came nearly a month after Roberts Broadcasting closed down WAZE-LP, WJPS-LP and WIKY-LP, which served as translators for Evansville's original CW affiliate WAZE-TV (the full-power WAZE signal shut down in early 2012, leaving the translators to carry its programming until they ceased operations). This makes Evansville one of the very few markets where an analog-era VHF station has an affiliation with a minor network, while all three of the currently operating analog-era UHF stations have affiliations with larger networks. WTVW began carrying The CW's daytime and prime time schedule on that date; however, the Saturday morning Vortexx children's block did not begin airing for another two months, on April 6, 2013, due to contractual obligations with paid programming providers through the end of March for their purchased Saturday morning timeslots, along with the station's existing E/I programs purchased through the syndication market. The syndicated E/I programs moved to Sunday afternoons on April 7.

On April 24, 2013, Communications Corporation of America (owner of WEVV) announced the sale of its entire group to Nexstar. Since there are fewer than eight full-power stations in the Evansville market, Nexstar and its partner company Mission were legally unable to purchase WEVV. WEVV was thus planned to be sold to a female-controlled company called Rocky Creek Communications. Nexstar would have operated the station under a shared service agreement, forming a virtual triopoly with sister stations WEHT and WTVW. August 4, 2014, Nexstar Broadcasting Group instead announced that it would sell WEVV to Bayou City Broadcasting for $18.6 million. The sale was completed on January 1, 2015. By coincidence, WEVV purchased WTVW's former Carpenter Street facility in 2014 and remodeled it to relaunch their news operation in August 2015.

== Programming ==
=== Sports programming ===
WTVW broadcasts National Football League preseason games involving three different NFL teams during the month of August. They include the Indianapolis Colts, the Tennessee Titans, and the Chicago Bears. Some of them are broadcast on tape-delay.

Starting in 1996, for the benefit of college sports fans in the Kentucky section of the station's coverage area, WTVW was the Evansville area's outlet for Southeastern Conference men's basketball games supplied by Jefferson Pilot Sports (later Lincoln Financial Sports, now Raycom Sports) until Raycom lost the rights at the end of the 2008–09 basketball season. That syndicator's SEC football broadcasts were also aired by the station from 1996 until 2008. WTVW carried the SEC TV syndication package from ESPN Plus from 2009 until 2014, when the cable- and satellite-exclusive SEC Network was launched, and the inception of that channel was responsible for the shut down of the syndicated SEC TV package. Raycom's ACC Network syndication service, which provides Atlantic Coast Conference football and basketball games, moved to WTVW from WFIE-DT2 in 2016.

=== News operation ===
The station currently carries 23 hours of local newscasts per week (with five hours each weekday and 1 1/2 hours each on Saturdays and Sundays); in addition to its main studios, WTVW (through WEHT) also operates a news bureau based in Owensboro. Both stations utilize a Doppler weather radar across the street from the Henderson facility.

Throughout its history, the station has always carried local news programming. Branded for years as Eyewitness News from 1974 to 1995, its newscasts were retitled as Fox 7 News from 1995 to 1998 following the affiliation switch to Fox. When WTVW joined Fox, news programming on the station was expanded to two hours on weekday mornings, along with the addition of a 5 p.m. newscast. Newscasts came and went, with the midday news being cancelled in the late 1990s, later followed by the 5 p.m. and finally, the morning news. This eventually left only the 6 and 9 p.m. newscasts (the 10 p.m. news had earlier been moved into the 9 p.m. slot and expanded to an hour); however, the morning and midday newscasts returned in March 2002. In 2006, the weekday morning newscast expanded to three hours, the midday newscast moved to noon and a 6:30 p.m. weeknight newscast was added to the schedule.

The news branding changed a number of times as well, as Fox 7 First News from 1998 to 2000, Fox 7 News again from 2000 to 2004, WTVW NewsChannel 7 from 2004 to 2005 and finally to Fox 7 WTVW News briefly in 2007, ultimately reverting to Fox 7 News title each time. Just prior to ending its Fox affiliation in June 2011, the station temporarily referred to its newscasts as News 7 in the last weeks aligned with the network, before being changed to Local 7 News on July 1. After becoming an independent station, WTVW expanded its 6 p.m. newscast to seven nights a week on July 9, 2011 (the program previously ran only on Monday through Saturdays, with the Saturday edition extended to one hour with the expansion), later followed on September 19, 2011, by the debut of a one-hour extension of the morning newscast called Local 7 News Lifestyles.

With the sale of WTVW to Mission Broadcasting and WEHT to Nexstar Broadcasting and the consolidation of their news operations at WEHT's studios, WTVW removed the 5–7 a.m. portion of the morning newscast, shortening it down to two hours starting at 7 a.m. (the 8 a.m. hour retained the Lifestyles format until the show moved to the 11 a.m. hour on WEHT in 2015) while the 6 p.m. newscast was shortened to a half-hour at 6:30 p.m. (though the Sunday 6 p.m. newscast remained on WTVW until it was moved to 5:30 p.m. on October 1, 2023, as WEHT airs ABC programming at that time). Existing evening anchors Randy Moore and Julie Dolan were moved to the morning newscasts on both stations (with Dolan also co-hosting Local 7 Lifestyles with Stefanie Martinez and anchoring the noon newscast until leaving WTVW/WEHT in 2012), while WEHT anchor Brad Byrd began anchoring the 6:30 and 9 p.m. newscasts (co-anchoring at 6:30 with Shelley Kirk until her departure); several other on-air staff members from both WEHT and WTVW were retained as part of the news department consolidation.

Both stations rebranded their newscasts as Eyewitness News (returning the title to WTVW after 16 years) on December 1, 2011; as a result of the consolidation of WTVW and WEHT's news operations, the Evansville market had only two local news operations amongst three stations for the next year, the other belonging to NBC affiliate WFIE (CBS affiliate WEVV-TV canceled its newscasts in 2001, after a nine-year run, but relaunched a news department in 2015). On August 13, 2012, WEHT and WTVW began broadcasting their local newscasts in high definition, with a new news set, HD cameras and forecasting equipment.

==== Notable former on-air staff ====
- Nancy Cozean
- David Goodnow – reporter
- Casey Stegall – reporter

== Technical information ==
=== Subchannels ===
The station's signal is multiplexed:

Subchannels of WTVW
Subchannel	Res.	Short name	Programming
7.1	720p	WTVW-HD	The CW
7.2	480i	Bounce	Bounce TV
7.3	480i	Escape	Ion Mystery
7.4	480i	Ion	Ion

On December 2, 2013, Nexstar Broadcasting announced an affiliation agreement with Bounce TV to carry the digital network on subchannels of WTVW and Fort Wayne sister station WFFT. Both stations began carrying Bounce TV on January 1, 2014. WTVW carries the network over-the-air on digital subchannel 7.2; in addition to airing Bounce TV programming, the subchannel also airs specialized editions of Eyewitness News.

On June 15, 2016, Nexstar announced that it had entered into an affiliation agreement with Katz Broadcasting for the Escape, Laff, Grit, and Bounce TV networks, bringing one or more of the networks to 81 stations owned and/or operated by Nexstar, including WTVW and WEHT. As a result, WTVW renewed its Bounce TV affiliation and added a DT3 subchannel carrying Laff, while WEHT added a DT2 subchannel carrying Escape (Grit was already available in Evansville on WFIE-DT3).

=== Analog-to-digital conversion ===
WTVW discontinued regular programming on its analog signal, over VHF channel 7, on June 12, 2009, the official date on which full-power television in the United States transitioned from analog to digital broadcasts under federal mandate. The station's digital signal remained on its pre-transition UHF channel 28, using virtual channel 7.
