= WFIE =

Television station in Evansville, Indiana

- Evansville, Indiana; Henderson–Owensboro, Kentucky; United States
- City: Evansville, Indiana
- Channels: Digital: 26 (UHF); Virtual: 14
- Branding: 14 WFIE; 14 News; MeTV Tri-State (14.2)

Programming
- Affiliations: 14.1: NBC; for others, see § Subchannels

Ownership
- Owner: Gray Media; (Gray Television Licensee, LLC)
- Sister stations: WEVV-TV, WEEV-LD

History
- First air date: November 15, 1953
- Former call signs: WFIE-TV (1953–2003)
- Former channel numbers: Analog: 62 (UHF, 1953–1957), 14 (UHF, 1957–2009); Digital: 46 (UHF, 2001–2019)
- Former affiliations: All secondary: DuMont (1953–1956); ABC (1953–1956)
- Call sign meaning: "We're First in Evansville"; -or-; Fine family (founding owners)

Technical information
- Licensing authority: FCC
- Facility ID: 13991
- ERP: 200 kW
- HAAT: 310 m (1,017 ft)
- Transmitter coordinates: 37°53′14.2″N 87°31′7″W

Links
- Public license information: Public file; LMS
- Website: www.14news.com

WFIE (channel 14) is a television station in Evansville, Indiana, United States, affiliated with NBC. It is owned by Gray Media alongside CBS/Fox/MyNetworkTV affiliate WEVV-TV (channel 44). WFIE's studios are located on Mount Auburn Road in Evansville, and its transmitter is located in the Wolf Hills section of Henderson, Kentucky.

== History ==
WFIE was granted a construction permit on June 10, 1953, and began broadcasting on November 15, 1953, on analog UHF channel 62. The station, Indiana's sixth, was originally co-owned by Jesse, Isadore, and Oscar Fine. WFIE was the second station in the Tri-State, but the first to be based in Evansville proper. WEHT (channel 25), while licensed to Evansville and having launched over a month before WFIE, has always had its studio located across the Ohio River in Henderson.

WFIE has always been an NBC affiliate, but originally carried secondary affiliations with ABC (shared with WEHT) and DuMont. Both of those networks were dropped in August 1956 with the launch of WTVW (which took ABC) and the shutdown of DuMont. It is the only station in the market never to have changed its primary affiliation; as such, WFIE has the distinction of being the longest-tenured NBC affiliate in the state of Indiana. Also in 1956, WFIE became the area's first station to telecast color programming (by virtue of its NBC affiliation).

The Fine family sold the station to the George Norton family of Louisville, Kentucky (owners of fellow NBC affiliate WAVE-TV) in 1956. The Nortons' broadcasting holdings would eventually become known as Orion Broadcasting. With FCC approval, it moved to the stronger channel 14 in 1957. It was the first station in Evansville to telecast live and local color programs beginning on March 10, 1966.

In October 1981, Orion merged with Cosmos Broadcasting Corporation, a subsidiary of insurance and broadcasting conglomerate Liberty Corporation. WFIE became the first television station in the market to broadcast in stereo in September 1985. Liberty bowed out of the insurance business in 2000, bringing WFIE directly under the company banner. In May 2002, the station began broadcasting digitally on channel 46.

On February 1, 2006, Liberty Corporation merged with Raycom Media, with ownership remaining steady for over 12 years.

=== Sale to Gray Television ===
On June 25, 2018, Atlanta-based Gray Television announced it had reached an agreement with Raycom to merge their respective broadcasting assets (consisting of Raycom's 63 existing owned-and/or-operated television stations, including WFIE, and Gray's 93 television stations) under the former's corporate umbrella. The cash-and-stock merger transaction valued at $3.6 billion—in which Gray shareholders acquired preferred stock then held by Raycom—resulted in WFIE gaining sister stations in nearby markets, including fellow NBC affiliate WNDU in South Bend (at the time Gray's only Indiana station) and ABC/Fox affiliate WBKO in adjacent Bowling Green, Kentucky, in addition to its current Raycom sister stations. The sale was approved on December 20 and completed on January 2, 2019. WFIE gained a new sister station in the market when Gray acquired WEVV-TV on May 1, 2026.

== WFIE-DT2 ==
WFIE-DT2 is the MeTV-affiliated second digital subchannel of WFIE, broadcasting in widescreen standard definition on channel 14.2.

=== History ===
==== As an NBC Weather Plus outlet ====
WFIE-DT2 was launched in fall 2005 as an affiliate of the NBC Weather Plus service, a 24-hour weather channel that provided regional and national weather information forecasts on a continuous basis, along with cut-ins of local weather forecasts from WFIE's weather forecasting team. WFIE's weather team provided the cut-ins for WFIE-DT2 during the entire existence of NBC Weather Plus. The channel's original branding was "First Alert Weather Now".

==== As "14Xtra" ====
In 2008, when the NBC Weather Plus was shut down and discontinued, it became a locally oriented weather channel until it was replaced by a local news-oriented format in the late quarter of 2008. It became an independent TV channel devoted to local news, weather, and sports in the Evansville media market. The channel was branded as "14Xtra". WFIE-DT2 also broadcast a prime time newscast weeknights at 9 pm, which competed with CW affiliate WTVW's hour-long newscast.

==== MeTV affiliation ====
MeTV was first carried as a secondary affiliation of WTVW after that station lost their Fox network affiliation to WEVV-DT2, thereby becoming an independent station in 2011. MeTV programming was only shown during the overnight hours, and during time slots where specific programming was not scheduled to air. WTVW dropped the partial MeTV schedule when that station became the Evansville market's new affiliate of The CW in January 2013. MeTV was carried in full by WTSN-CD and WYYW-CD from November 2011 until the former station dropped that network in favor of a new network called Heroes & Icons on October 23, 2014. WYYW also switched to Heroes & Icons in February 2014.

MeTV replaced the Movies! network on WFIE-DT3 (channel 14.3) for five days until it was replaced by a new movie network, Grit, a multicast network that specifically targets men in the 25–54 age group. To make room for the new Grit network, and for MeTV to remain available in the Evansville market, the full MeTV programming lineup was moved up to WFIE-DT2 at noon CT on October 28, 2014, after Grit made its Evansville debut on WFIE-DT3. After the switch, 14Xtra was no more.

=== Programming ===
WFIE-DT2 clears all of MeTV's programming since the subchannel switched to MeTV from a local news-formatted channel in 2014. Until 2016, the only other programming besides the full MeTV schedule was the syndicated Atlantic Coast Conference (ACC) football and men's basketball provided by the ACC Network that is operated by Raycom Media's sports syndication division, Raycom Sports. This is due in part of University of Notre Dame's sports programs (with the exception of the football team) joining the ACC that year. WTVW took over local rights to the ACC Network in 2016.

== News operation ==
WFIE currently carries 32 hours of local newscasts per week (with six hours each weekday and one hour each on Saturdays and Sundays); in addition, the station produces a half-hour weeknight-only newscast for its second digital subchannel, bringing the total amount to 34 1/2 hours per week. As a result of the merger of the news operations of WTVW and WEHT on December 1, 2011, WFIE and CBS affiliate WEVV-TV (channel 44) are now the only independent local news operations in the Evansville market.

In August 1977, the station became the first in Evansville to remotely broadcast local news, sports, and weather outside its studios. It was the second station in Indiana (first in Evansville) to build its own Doppler weather radar system (located adjacent to the studios) in February 1988.

On April 16, 2007, WFIE introduced "Dual Doppler" to the market with the debut of a second weather radar in Owensboro, Kentucky, atop the Owensboro Medical Health System Hospital main building on East Parrish Avenue (KY 54). In addition to its main studios, the station operates Western Kentucky newsrooms in Owensboro and Madisonville. It is the only station in the market to have a weekday morning show that begins at 4:30 am. WFIE-DT2 also airs a prime time newscast weeknights at 9 pm, which competes with an hour-long show on CW affiliate WTVW.

On July 11, 2011, WFIE began broadcasting its local newscasts in high definition during the station's 5 p.m. newscast, becoming the first station in the Evansville market to begin offering local newscasts in high definition. On September 12, 2011, WFIE debuted a 4 p.m. newscast that competes against the 4 p.m. show on ABC affiliate WEHT; Jackie Monroe served as anchor of the new late-afternoon newscast, which still airs on WFIE.

WFIE maintains a "sister-station" relationship with a television station in the western Ukraine city of Ternopil.

== Technical information ==
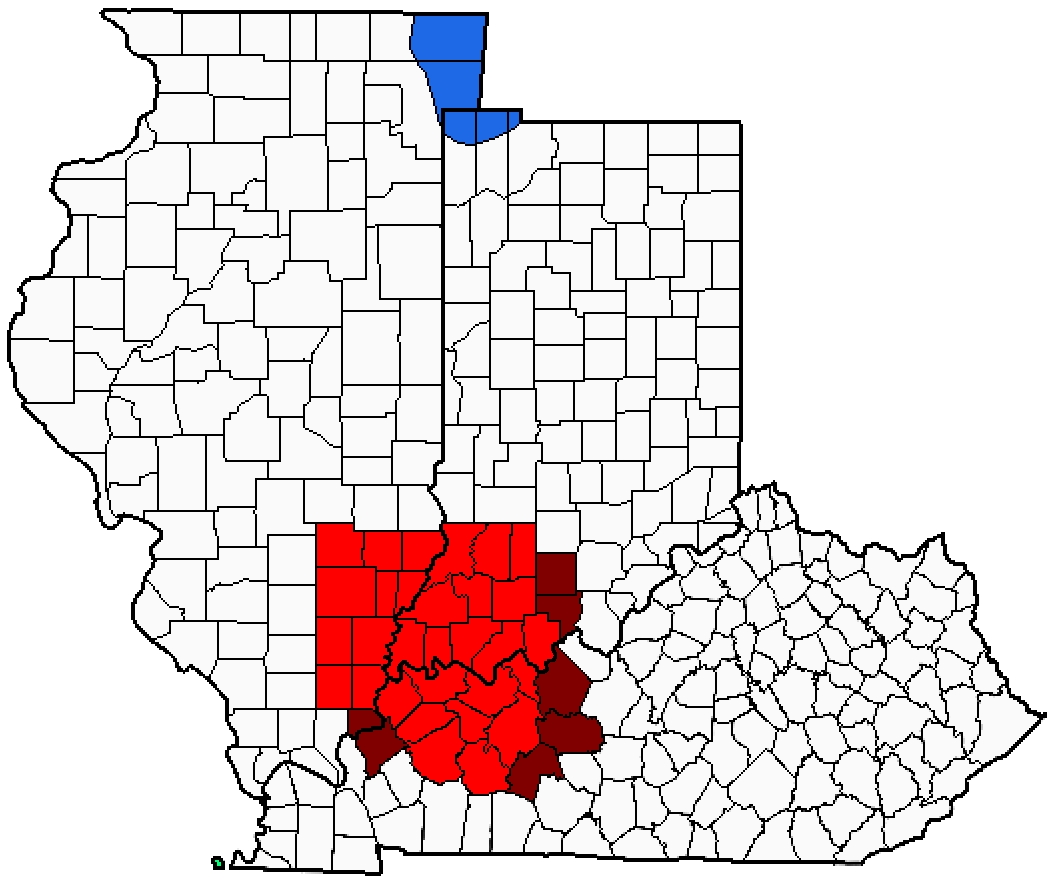
The WFIE viewing area; counties where the station's signal reaches either over-the-air, on cable or satellite are shown in light red.

=== Subchannels ===
The station's signal is multiplexed:

Subchannels of WFIE
Subchannel	Res.	Short name	Programming
14.1	1080i	WFIE-DT	NBC
14.2	720p	MeTV	MeTV
14.3	480i	Outlaw	Outlaw
14.4	480i	Grit	Grit
14.5	480i	365BLK	365BLK
14.6	480i	TruCrim	True Crime Network
14.7	480i	IONPlus	Ion Plus

=== Analog-to-digital conversion ===
WFIE ended regular programming on its analog signal, over UHF channel 14, on June 12, 2009, the official date when full-power television stations in the United States transitioned from analog to digital broadcasts under federal mandate. The station's digital signal remained on its pre-transition UHF channel 46, using virtual channel 14.
