= KAGW-CD =

Television station in Wichita, Kansas

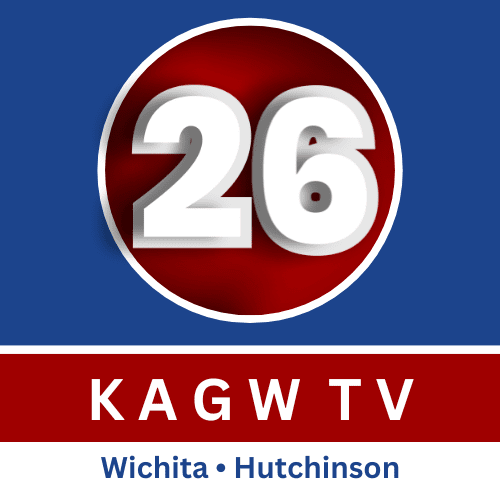

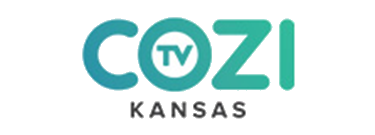
- Wichita, Kansas; United States
- Channels: Digital: 24 (UHF); Virtual: 26
- Branding: KAGW 26 (general); Cozi TV Kansas

Programming
- Affiliations: 26.1: Cozi TV; for others, see § Subchannels

Ownership
- Owner: Great Plains Television; (Urban Investment Broadcasting, LLC)
- Sister stations: K30RF-D

History
- Founded: Current license: March 27, 2012
- First air date: Former license: June 6, 1998; Current license: August 6, 2013
- Last air date: Former license: August 5, 2013
- Former call signs: Former license: K53EO (1998); KTQW-LP (1998–2004); KTQW-CA (2004–2007); KGPT-CA (2007–2013); Current license: KGPT-LD (2012–2013); KGPT-CD (2013–2021)
- Former channel number: Analog: 53 (UHF, 1998–2004), 49 (UHF, 2004–2013)
- Former affiliations: America's Voice; TLN; UATV; Sportsman Channel; Faith TV; DrTV; ZDTV (1998–2000); TechTV (2000–?)
- Call sign meaning: Keep America Great Wichita

Technical information
- Licensing authority: FCC
- Facility ID: 190120
- Class: CD
- ERP: 15 kW
- HAAT: 248.5 m (815 ft)
- Transmitter coordinates: 37°48′0.7″N 97°31′30.2″W

Links
- Public license information: Public file; LMS
- Website: kagwtv.com

KAGW-CD (channel 26) is a low-power, Class A television station in Wichita, Kansas, United States, affiliated with several digital multicast networks, including Cozi TV on its main channel. It is owned by Great Plains Television and operated alongside K30RF-D (channel 30). The two stations share offices on South Greenwood Street in Wichita; KAGW-CD's transmitter is located in rural northwestern Sedgwick County (north-northeast of Colwich).

== History ==
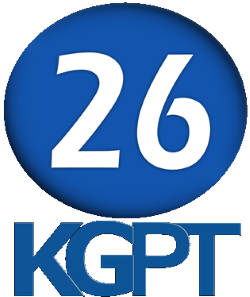
KAGW-CD's logo branded as KGPT 26 used from 2013 until 2018.

The station first signed on the air on June 6, 1998, as K53EO, broadcasting on UHF channel 53. It was originally an affiliate of both America's Voice and ZDTV. On November 16, 1998, the station's call letters were changed to KTQW-LP, in reference to its slogan "Total Quality Wichita". At first, it was the sole broadcast affiliate of the otherwise cable and satellite network that evolved into TechTV, carrying the network's programming 20 hours a day, with the remaining four hours allocated to locally produced programs. By 2003, The Sportsman Channel had replaced TechTV on weekends. The station relocated its signal to UHF channel 49 on June 10, 2004, and upgraded its license to Class A status, modifying its call sign to KTQW-CA.

In 2006, Knowledge LC sold the station to Great Plains Television Network, LLC; the sale was approved by the Federal Communications Commission (FCC) on December 14, 2006, and was completed one week later on December 21. On January 8, 2007, the station's call letters were officially changed to KGPT-CA to match the name of the company, Kansas Great Plains Television Network. The station has applied to increase its effective radiated power from 4.8 to 13.91 kilowatts.

On August 6, 2013, at 1:30 pm, the station moved its signal to UHF channel 26 and began operating its digital signal from a newly constructed transmission tower located north-northeast of Colwich; the station also increased its effective radiated power to 15 kilowatts, resulting in a significant increase in the station's coverage area.

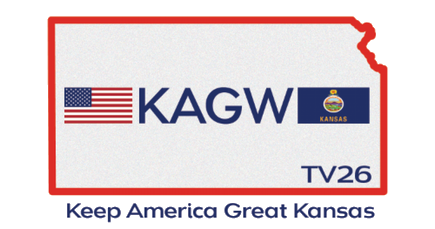
KAGW-CD's logo used from 2021 until 2026.

A Kansas court ordered the station into receivership in December 2020 after former owner Urban Investment Broadcasting sued, claiming GPTN had failed to meet the terms of the promissory note it had used to acquire the station; Tyler Brown was appointed as receiver. On July 1, 2021, the call sign changed to KAGW-CD. On July 4, the station rebranded to KAGW 26 (KAGW stands for Keep America Great Wichita, while their slogan is actually Keep America Great Kansas).

The station slogan is a variation of the "Keep America Great" slogan used in Donald Trump's campaign during the 2020 presidential election.

== Programming ==
In addition to carrying programming from eight networks on its digital subchannels, the station formerly produced locally produced programs (such as WichitaLiberty.TV and Ascension Café).

=== Yellow Ribbons from Home ===
KAGW also produced a special saluting U.S. military personnel and their families titled Yellow Ribbons From Home, which aired on July 4, 2007. The special included video greetings to the military members from their families, then-Governor Kathleen Sebelius, Senators Pat Roberts and Sam Brownback and all four of Kansas' Congressional representatives, as well as former Senator Bob Dole and Wichita mayor Carl Brewer. Country musicians including Darryl Worley, Blake Shelton, Emerson Drive, Terri Clark and Heartland also sent greetings and provided special performances. The special was also streamed and later offered on-demand on the station's website, allowing its viewing by members of the military stationed elsewhere around the world. On June 22, 2007, Governor Sebelius proclaimed July as Yellow Ribbons From Home Month, in commemoration of the special.

== Technical information ==
=== Subchannels ===
The station's signal is multiplexed:

Subchannels of KAGW-CD
| Subchannel | Res. | Short name | Programming |
|---|---|---|---|
| 26.1 | 480i | KAGW CD | Cozi TV (4:3) |
| 26.2 | 480i | JTV | Jewelry TV (4:3) |
| 26.3 | 480i | CBN | CBN News (4:3) |
| 26.4 | 480i | TRUCRMZ | NBC True CRMZ (4:3) |
| 26.5 | 480i | BIZ TV | Biz TV |
| 26.6 | 480i | BUZZR | Buzzr (4:3) |
| 26.7 | 480i | NEWSMAX | Newsmax2 (4:3) |
| 26.8 | 480i | OAN | One America Plus (4:3) |
| 26.9 | 720p | RAV | Real America's Voice (4:3) |
| 26.10 | 480i | WTHRNAT | WeatherNation TV (4:3) |
| 26.11 | 480i | DIYA | Diya TV |
| 26.12 | 480i | SPURS | SilverSpur TV (4:3) |
| 26.14 | 480i | QUINLEY | Quinnly TV |

Subchannel broadcast with MPEG-4 video
