= WNIN (TV) =

Television station in Evansville, Indiana

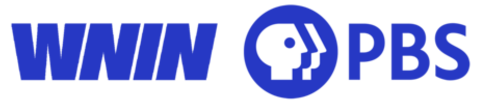
- Evansville, Indiana; Henderson–Owensboro, Kentucky; United States
- Channels: Digital: 9 (VHF); Virtual: 9
- Branding: WNIN PBS

Programming
- Affiliations: 9.1: PBS; 9.2: PBS Kids

Ownership
- Owner: WNIN Tri-State Public Media, Inc.
- Sister stations: WNIN-FM

History
- First air date: March 5, 1970
- Former channel numbers: Analog: 9 (VHF, 1970–2009); Digital: 12 (VHF, 2003–2009)
- Former affiliations: NET (March–October 1970); Dark (1973)
- Call sign meaning: Channel Nine

Technical information
- Licensing authority: FCC
- Facility ID: 67802
- ERP: 27 kW
- HAAT: 305.1 m (1,001 ft)
- Transmitter coordinates: 37°59′1″N 87°16′13″W

Links
- Public license information: Public file; LMS
- Website: www.wnin.org

WNIN (channel 9) is a PBS member television station in Evansville, Indiana, United States. It is owned by WNIN Tri-State Public Media alongside NPR member station WNIN-FM (88.3 MHz). The two outlets share studios at the WNIN Public Media Center on Two Main Street, near Riverside Drive, in downtown Evansville and transmitter facilities south of Boonville, Indiana, on New Hope Road.

Channel 9 was originally allocated as a commercial channel to the Illinois–Indiana–Kentucky tri-state area in 1953 for Hatfield, Indiana, opposite the Ohio River from Owensboro, Kentucky. It was fought over by two commercial groups, but the proceeding was voided when the Federal Communications Commission reallocated the channel for non-commercial use in Evansville. Educational television programming in Evansville had been broadcast by WTVW beginning in 1958, but the commercial station was anxious to begin full-time commercial service and ceased airing programs for schools in 1967. Delays in funding and equipment meant that Evansville had no educational station of its own until WNIN began broadcasting on March 15, 1970, from studios in the McCutchanville School. It was originally owned by the Evansville Vanderburgh School Corporation and was nearly immediately a drain on its finances. The school board looked for a new operator for channel 9 in 1972 and spun it out the next year to a new community licensee, Southwest Indiana Public Television, in an effort backed by the University of Evansville. WNIN began broadcasting in color and in the years that followed began local program production. In 1982, the television station spawned WNIN-FM, the tri-state's first public radio station.

After three separate attempts in a seven-year span to acquire and renovate a new location in downtown Evansville failed to materialize, WNIN moved into the historic Willard Carpenter House in 1986; an annex was built to house a production studio for the station. In 2017, the station moved into its present studio building, which was built for broadcasting use by WEVV-TV in 1990. WNIN produces local programming on Tri-State and Southwest Indiana issues.

== Channel 9: From Owensboro to Evansville ==
Owensboro on the Air, Inc., owner of the WVJS stations in Owensboro, Kentucky, petitioned the Federal Communications Commission (FCC) in October 1953 to assign VHF channel 9 to Hatfield, Indiana—across the Ohio River, 12 miles (19 km) northwest of Owensboro and 17 miles (27 km) east of Evansville, Indiana—for use by a potential WVJS television station. At the time, only UHF channel 14 was allocated to Owensboro, and two groups sought it: WVJS and the Owensboro Publishing Company, publisher of the Messenger and Inquirer newspapers and owner of WOMI. WVJS's application was rejected in October 1952 as too early, and the group refiled it in June 1953, at the earliest opportunity given by the FCC. While the petition was pending, WVJS's channel 14 application was granted on August 20, 1953, after the Publishing Company withdrew. However, both parties instead filed for the new channel 9 when the FCC granted WVJS's petition the next month. After a federal court denied a Logansport, Indiana, group's bid for alternate channel assignments, the way was cleared for the FCC to determine which of Owensboro on the Air or the Owensboro Publishing Company should get the channel. Hearings opened in Washington in December 1954.

The Hatfield channel 9 hearings factored into the larger television picture in Evansville. Evansville had been assigned one VHF channel, 7, but by the time a decision had been made as to who should receive it, two UHF stations were on the air: WFIE and WEHT. The two UHF stations wanted all commercial broadcasting in the Evansville area to be on UHF for parity reasons. The process of petitioning the FCC to add, remove, or reserve for non-commercial use one or more channel allocations in a specific market, such that all commercial allocations ended up on the same band, became known as deintermixture. The three applicants for channel 7 at Evansville and the two applicants for channel 9 at Hatfield jointly petitioned the FCC not to adopt the UHF stations' proposal, which would have eliminated channel 9 from the area; reserved channel 7 as non-commercial educational; and added a third UHF commercial assignment to Evansville as a substitute. The commission denied their petition, and similar deintermixture petitions in other cities, in November 1955, but it reversed course and began moving to implement deintermixture in June 1956, making changes in Evansville but not Hatfield.

The February 11, 1957, edition of Broadcasting•Telecasting magazine reported that a majority of commissioners had voted to deintermix Evansville. It would do so by moving channel 7 to Louisville, Kentucky, and reserving Hatfield's channel 9. Days later, FCC hearing examiner Thomas Donahue finally rendered an initial decision on channel 9. He found both applicants' records "mediocre" but picked Owensboro on the Air because it owned fewer mass media than Owensboro Publishing Company. He also recognized that channel 9 would be reliant on Evansville for personnel and revenue. It was a decision on a channel that was about to go away. The FCC announced its intention to deintermix Evansville on February 27, proposing to move channel 7 (WTVW) to channel 31 and move channel 9 to Evansville for educational use. Both Owensboro firms appealed the FCC's ruling but lost in the United States Court of Appeals for the District of Columbia Circuit in December 1958. John A. Danaher's majority opinion held that the companies had failed to show specifically how the deintermixture decision injured them. They appealed to the Supreme Court of the United States, which in June 1959 refused to review the order. The FCC dismissed the applications in February 1960.

== History ==
=== Educational television in Evansville: Prehistory ===
In March 1958, the Evansville school board pledged support for a new organization, the Southwestern Indiana Educational Television Council (SWIETVC), joining regional school systems to provide educational television to classrooms. On September 3, 1958, some 11,000 students began receiving school instruction broadcast over WTVW, which offered morning airtime to the group. With interest from schools beyond the original region including in Kentucky and Illinois, regional educational television served 24,000 students the next year and 35,000 students in 1960–61.

Originally based out of offices in the former Carpenter School, the educational television operation moved into WTVW's studios next door in 1961, when the school was demolished as part of an urban renewal program. In spite of declining funding from the Ford Foundation, which subsidized the program's early years, the service became self-supporting by 1962–63. Classes presented included conversational Spanish, American history, and junior high school science. In 1962, Evansville's school system was consolidated with that of surrounding Vanderburgh County to form the Evansville Vanderburgh School Corporation (EVSC).

=== Evansville Vanderburgh School Corporation ownership ===
In December 1966, WTVW announced it would donate equipment it was taking out of use to make the activation of educational channel 9 at Evansville possible. The station was building a new tower at Chandler, Indiana, and WTVW was interested in beginning morning commercial telecasting when it went into service. The EVSC was requested to make the application for channel 9 to the FCC, and selected the old McCutchanville School as a studio site, since its former gym was the newest part of the campus and ideal for studio use.

The application was made on June 30, 1967, but educational television in Evansville found itself in a lurch. Under pressure from its network, ABC, WTVW took back its airtime to begin morning commercial telecasting, and the federal government moved slower than expected to award money to finance channel 9's construction, leaving no station on which to broadcast the programs. At the time, Vincennes University was building WVUT (channel 22), an educational TV station, on its campus. To fill the gap, school officials resorted to broadcasting the programming over WRAY-FM in Princeton, Indiana. WVUT sent out its first test pattern in January 1968 after several delays, but reception was not as clear as had been desired or as had been the case with WTVW. A translator was added to rebroadcast the station into the Evansville area on channel 70. In the meantime, the federal money was not coming in: all of the funds allocated by Congress in 1967 were awarded, and a new law restricted the maximum award to a single state per year, forcing the schools to reduce their ask.

In May 1969, Indiana state superintendent of public instruction Richard Wells approved the channel 9 funding request—a step Wells called equivalent to receiving the funds, as the Department of Health, Education, and Welfare had never gone against any of his recommendations. The FCC awarded the construction permit on June 18, and the school board—having already bid out for equipment—moved to begin construction. After the funding delays, the station lost equipment amid a railroad strike, further delaying the station's start. WNIN began broadcasting on March 15, 1970, with a dedication and programming from National Educational Television (NET). Its call sign came from the word "nine". NET was replaced as the public television network with PBS in October 1970.

WNIN nearly immediately ran into financial trouble. The decision that the EVSC should run the station put channel 9's entire budget under one system instead of distributing costs across the 16 Indiana school systems using its programming. It also dissuaded some smaller systems from taking part in the operation. The Vanderburgh County Tax Adjustment Board slashed $60,000 from the school board's budget for 1971, but the school board was successful in appealing most of that cut, allowing the station to stay on the air for 1971–72 and meet obligations to the other school systems. The proposed station operations for the school year, however, still projected a deficit. At the start of 1972, it changed its evening offerings from a Monday–Friday schedule to a Sunday–Wednesday schedule, not because of money issues but because it received PBS programming from Kentucky Educational Television (KET), which changed its schedule.

By July 1972, the school board was starting to look for another operator to take over WNIN. It only had plans to keep the station on the air through the first week of August 1973. By March, the University of Evansville was leading an effort to form a community licensee to acquire the station and keep it operating. It pledged $100,000 toward the effort, which incorporated in April as Southwest Indiana Public Television, Inc. WNIN ceased night programming on June 6 and left the air entirely on August 3, having broadcast exclusively in black and white in its three years of school board operation. The school corporation retained its radio station, WPSR, which continued to broadcast from the McCutchanville site into the early 1980s.

=== Public ownership and public radio ===
On September 30, 1973, WNIN returned to air—in color, for the first time—with a preview of the forthcoming season's PBS programming ahead of an October 1 start of regular afternoon and evening programming. Southwest Indiana Public Television leased the station to the University of Evansville for two years. The new station was reliant on community support, holding its first on-air auction in May 1974. Local program production commenced that year, but it was not until 1976 that the station could produce local shows in color; in 1976, it produced its first major local series, the 13-part astrology program Natural Way. WNIN had the highest weekly audience share of any public television station in Indiana by 1977, by which time it had expanded its weekly broadcasting from 37 hours to 80 and tripled its budget. Manager Vince Saele originated the idea of airing a marathon of programming as part of a fundraising idea; after the concept had been rejected in his previous job at WNED-TV in Buffalo, New York, WNIN tried the idea in 1976. It was successful enough that PBS began conducting a national version, called Festival, the next year.

Saele resigned in 1980 to take the same role at WYES-TV in New Orleans. He was replaced at WNIN by Arthur Paul, a businessman and former leader of KVIE in Sacramento, California. He found the station in need of financial discipline and worked to make fund drives more efficient, moving the auction to a larger venue. The local programming budget was cut from $55,000 to $10,000, and the station slashed morning broadcasting, changing its sign-on time from 11 a.m. to 3 p.m. The station was reorganized from seven departments to four with an eye to increasing the station's for-profit production activity. After losing money in WNIN, the station made money in 1982 and 1983. Paul resigned in September 1984.

WNIN began pursuing the development of a local public radio station in 1977; at the time, Vincennes and Carbondale, Illinois, had the nearest such stations. The group changed its name to Southwest Indiana Public Broadcasting to reflect its wider scope. (Note: It became Tri-State Public Teleplex in 1993 and Tri-State Public Media in 2008.) It received a grant from the Corporation for Public Broadcasting (CPB) and filed to build the station on 88.3 MHz. The firm that was to build the FM station defaulted midway through construction, but WNIN-FM began broadcasting on February 1, 1982, with classical music, fine arts programming, and NPR programs. Much like channel 9, WNIN-FM struggled financially in its first year, to the point that the board of Southwest Indiana Public Broadcasting sought a potential sale within nine months of its start. The library board, two local universities, and two Christian groups all expressed interest. The library opted not to buy the station due to predicted declines in property taxes, and the station recovered financially and stabilized by 1985.

=== Relocation to downtown Evansville ===
Also in 1977, WNIN began the process of looking for a new home that was larger and more centrally located than the McCutchanville School. It sought to buy a 26,000-square-foot (2,400 m^{2}) former funeral home on Fifth Street; struggled to finance the project amid high interest rates and unexpectedly high costs; moved to purchase a former Eagles lodge belonging to Lockyear College, across the street, that it deemed a better fit than the funeral home; postponed the move owing to falling membership and proposed cuts to public TV after a change in management to reduce expenses; and moved to lease the former building of the bankrupt Central Turners social club, only to struggle with financing and divert the funds to buying a direly needed new transmitter for channel 9.

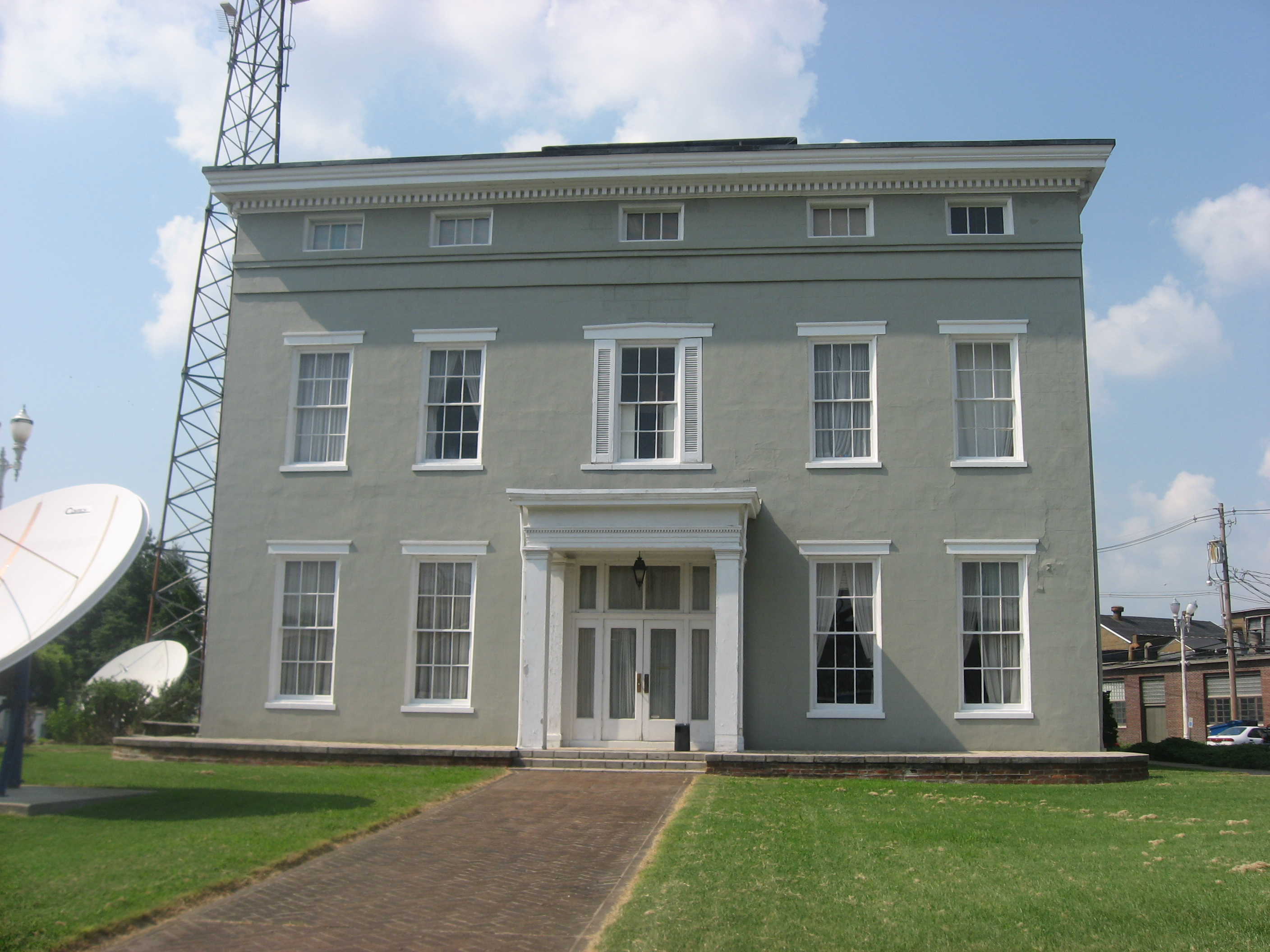
The Willard Carpenter House housed WNIN radio and television from 1987 to 2017.

After evaluating two downtown sites and the campus of the University of Southern Indiana as future homes, the station bought the 137-year-old Willard Carpenter House in November 1985, after its owner reduced the price in half. WNIN became the second television station to broadcast from the Carpenter home—listed on the National Register of Historic Places—after WTVW, which started in the building before constructing new quarters next door. WNIN built an annex behind the home to serve as the television studio; administrative and radio staff moved into the home portion before funds were raised to complete the studios, which opened by 1988.

=== The Dial era ===
Arthur Paul was replaced as general manager by David L. Dial, who had previously served as WNIN's director of broadcasting. Under Dial, WNIN resumed morning broadcasting in 1985, after a three-year hiatus.

In 1991, two new public-access television cable channels were set up in Vanderburgh County. The channels, reserved for the EVSC, were operated in cooperation with WNIN. They provided school information and recorded education programs for classrooms and, beginning in 1993, Indiana telecourses. Beginning in 1999, one of the channels was devoted to 24-hour PBS children's programming.

For the digital television conversion, WNIN built its own tower south of Boonville, which was twice as tall as the leased tower it replaced. The antenna on the new mast did not initially perform to design, leading WNIN to have the entire part replaced and shipped back to Dielectric in Maine. Also on the new tower was WNIN's digital facility, which came into use on May 1, 2003. In 2004, WNIN began televising Vanderburgh County Commission meetings on one of the access channels, with delayed repeats on WNIN.

WNIN completed its digital transition in 2009, with its digital signal moving from channel 12 to channel 9 for post-transition operations. Later that year, WNIN was the first station to launch the Indiana Channel, a statewide programming service; programming aired in afternoons on the station's second digital subchannel.

=== Move to 44 Main and rescissions cutbacks ===
David Dial retired in 2013 and was replaced by Brad Kimmel, who had produced the TV series My Classic Car as well as other automotive programs. The next year, WNIN debuted a new local series, Top 9; it produced five episodes and then started a crowdfunding campaign to finance the production costs of five more.

With the aid of a donor, WNIN acquired the building at 44 Main Street, formerly home to WEVV-TV, in 2017. It sought to relocate because the historic Carpenter house had high upkeep costs and was in a less accessible area of downtown. Unlike the house, 44 Main had been built for broadcasting by WEVV in 1990. The site previously used by the WEVV news studio was converted into a 50-seat public theater for screening PBS programs and events. The Carpenter house was left nearly abandoned until it was purchased in 2023 to house a real estate firm.

Kimmel left in 2020 for the same position at WFIU–WTIU at Indiana University Bloomington. In 2025, Congress rescinded funding for CPB, at the same time that Indiana lawmakers defunded public media in the state. At the time, nearly 35 percent of WNIN's revenue came from the corporation. In response, WNIN laid off five employees, ceased carriage of 15 weekend programs, and reformatted its local TV shows to prioritize digital distribution.

== Local programming ==
Local programs include the series Lawmakers, which reports on the activities of local legislators, and WNIN Newsmakers. The station also airs Two Main Street with David James, a radio and television interview show, and the political commentary series Shively & Shoulders.

== Subchannels ==
WNIN broadcasts from a transmitter south of Boonville, Indiana, on New Hope Road. The station's signal is multiplexed:

Subchannels of WNIN
Subchannel	Res.	Short name	Programming
9.1	1080i	WNIN-HD	PBS
9.2	480i	WNIN-SD	PBS Kids
