= PBJ (TV network) =

American television network (2011–2016)

- Country: United States

Ownership
- Owner: Luken Communications and DreamWorks Classics (NBCUniversal)
- Sister channels: Retro TV; Heartland; Rev'n; Tuff TV; The Family Channel

History
- Launched: August 1, 2011; 15 years ago
- Closed: March 31, 2016; 10 years ago

PBJ was an American digital broadcast children's television network originally a joint venture between Luken Communications (now Get After It Media) and Classic Media (now DreamWorks Classics). PBJ launched on August 1, 2011, and had nineteen broadcast affiliates. The channel quietly closed at the end of March 2016.

== Programming ==
PBJ aired programs from the DreamWorks Classics library including The Archie Show, Mr. Magoo, Sabrina the Teenage Witch, The Lone Ranger, Gumby, The Harveytoons Show, The Secrets of Isis, The New Adventures of Zorro, Shazam!, and Lassie.

PBJ also aired automotive programming from Tuff TV in non-prime midday and late night timeslots, along with paid programming and acquired series like Aqua Kids Adventures and Ethelbert the Tiger.

Original logo used during the first year of broadcast
