= WYYW-CD =

Television station in Evansville, Indiana

- Evansville, Indiana; United States
- Channels: Digital: 15 (UHF); Virtual: 15
- Branding: Telemundo 15 Evansville

Programming
- Affiliations: 15.1: Telemundo; 15.2: The Family Channel; 15.3: Retro TV

Ownership
- Owner: Three Sisters Broadcasting, LLC
- Sister stations: WTSN-CD

History
- Founded: Former license: November 29, 1991; Current license: August 22, 1995
- First air date: Former license: November 8, 1993; Current license: September 15, 1997
- Last air date: Former license: June 1, 2009
- Former call signs: Former license: W63BT (1991–1996); WTSN-LP (1996–February 2009); WYYW-LP (February–June 1, 2009); Current license: W56DN (1995–2007); W36DF (2007–January 2009); WYYW-LP (January–February 2009); WTSN-LP (February–July 15, 2009); WTSN-LD (July 15, 2009); WTSN-CD (July 15, 2009–2012)
- Former channel numbers: Analog: Former license: 63 (UHF, 1993–2000), 58 (UHF, 2000–2004), 41 (UHF, 2004–2009); Current license: 56 (UHF, 1997–2007), 36 (UHF, 2007–2009); Digital: 36 (UHF, 2009–2012)
- Former affiliations: Independent (1993−1998); Pax TV (1998−2003); UPN (secondary 1998−2003; primary 2003–2006); MyNetworkTV (2006−2009); America One (2009−2011); MeTV (2011−2014); Heartland (2014−2015)

Technical information
- Licensing authority: FCC
- Facility ID: 17742
- Class: CD
- ERP: 15 kW
- HAAT: 160.8 m (528 ft)
- Transmitter coordinates: 37°59′13″N 87°16′11″W

Links
- Public license information: Public file; LMS
- Website: www.wtsn-tristate.com/wyyw-cd/

WYYW-CD (channel 15) is a low-power, Class A television station in Evansville, Indiana, United States, affiliated with the Spanish-language network Telemundo. The station is owned by Three Sisters Broadcasting alongside Antenna TV affiliate WTSN-CD (channel 20).

== History ==
Logo used 2009-2012 under the WTSN callsign and when the station was branded as The Total Sports Network.

Until 2009, WYYW-CD was co-owned by the Evansville Low Power Partnership and Comcorp, as a sister station to Evansville CBS affiliate WEVV-TV.

On May 19, 2009, the then-WTSN-LP ceased broadcasting My44 and MyNetworkTV programming, and on June 1, the station flash cut to digital as WTSN-LD and changed its affiliation to America One. WEVV now carries MyNetworkTV as a secondary affiliation on digital channel 44.2.

In August 2010, both WTSN-LD and WYYW-LP were granted Class A status by the Federal Communications Commission (FCC). The Class A designation protects them from being relocated to another channel by a full-power station.

In November 2011, WTSN-CD and WYYW-LP became affiliates of the classic programming network MeTV.

On December 12, 2012, WTSN-CD and WYYW-CD swapped call signs. The original WTSN-CD became WYYW-CD, while the original WYYW-CD became WTSN-CD.

On February 25, 2014, WYYW-CD dropped MeTV and took on the Heartland affiliation. The station also added a second digital subchannel to carry The Family Channel on 15.2 on that same date. MeTV was still seen on WTSN-CD until October 23. Then on January 17, 2015, WTSN-CD aired repeats of Heartland's E/I programming on Saturday mornings, replacing its Heroes & Icons affiliation at that time during the weekend with these programs because of its religious programming on Sunday mornings until the affiliation with WYYW-CD ended. Then, in July of that year, WYYW-CD started to affiliate with the Spanish–language network Telemundo with Retro TV airing on 15.3.

== Subchannels ==
The station's signal is multiplexed:

Subchannels of WYYW-CD
Subchannel	Res.	Short name	Programming
15.1	1080i	WYYW-1	Telemundo
15.2	480i	WYYW-2	The Family Channel
15.3	480i	WYYW-3	Retro TV
