= WNIN-FM =

Public radio station in Evansville, Indiana, United States

- Evansville, Indiana; United States
- Broadcast area: Evansville metropolitan area
- Frequency: 88.3 MHz (HD Radio)
- Branding: WNIN 88.3

Programming
- Format: Public radio; talk; classical
- Affiliations: American Public Media; NPR

Ownership
- Owner: WNIN Tri-State Public Media, Inc.
- Sister stations: WNIN (TV)

History
- First air date: February 1, 1982
- Call sign meaning: from sister station WNIN television (channel 9)

Technical information
- Licensing authority: FCC
- Facility ID: 67801
- Class: B
- ERP: 17,000 watts
- HAAT: 256 meters (840 ft)
- Transmitter coordinates: 37°59′1″N 87°16′13″W

Links
- Public license information: Public file; LMS
- Webcast: Listen live
- Website: www.wnin.org

WNIN-FM (88.3 MHz FM) is the NPR member station in Evansville, Indiana, United States, serving the Illinois–Indiana–Kentucky tri-state area. It is owned by WNIN Tri-State Public Media alongside WNIN television (channel 9), with studios and offices on Two Main Street near Riverside Drive in downtown Evansville. It broadcasts from a transmitter on New Hope Road, south of Boonville, and streams on its website.

== History ==
In 1977, Evansville, Indiana, public television station WNIN (channel 9) began studying the possibility of bringing a public radio station to the city. The nearest such stations to Evansville were in Vincennes and Carbondale, Illinois. In March, the group conducted a search for an available frequency, a search fruitful enough to lead the station to apply for a grant from the Corporation for Public Broadcasting. On September 26, 1977, Southwest Indiana Public Television—renamed Southwest Indiana Public Broadcasting to reflect its wider scope—applied to the Federal Communications Commission (FCC) for approval of a new station on 88.3 MHz, being granted a construction permit on September 28, 1978. At the time, it was planned that WNIN-FM would begin broadcasting in 1979.

The arrival of public radio to Evansville was wrapped up in the parallel process of trying to find a new, downtown home for WNIN. The station had been located in the McCutchanville School and explored a former funeral home, for which it struggled to refinance renovations, and a former Eagles lodge before new station management postponed the move, owing to falling membership and proposed cuts to public broadcasting. It also considered changing the call sign from WNIN-FM so as to give the radio station its own identity. Because of the limited available budget, the new station would not qualify to be an NPR member immediately.

Construction of WNIN-FM began in 1981, but it hit a snag when Electronics Services of Bloomington defaulted on its contract to install the antenna, having already built the transmitter building at the tower at Chandler. As a result, the job was bid out to another company. WNIN-FM began broadcasting on February 1, 1982, with classical music, fine arts programming, and NPR programs. Dete Hultmark, who helped sign on WNIN-FM, recalled that the studio building had wasp and bird nests and that crickets could be heard behind announcers' voices on air.

Much like channel 9, WNIN-FM struggled financially in its first year, to the point that the board of Southwest Indiana Public Broadcasting sought a potential sale within nine months of its start. The Evansville Vanderburgh Public Library board, two local universities, and two Christian groups all expressed interest. The library opted not to buy the station due to predicted declines in property taxes, leaving one last avenue to keep it going. Hundreds of supporters pledged their own money to keep WNIN on the air, hoping the library would reconsider. It did not, but the support convinced Southwest Indiana Public Broadcasting to keep the station going. By 1985, WNIN-FM had turned a corner. To correct reception issues caused by sharing a satellite dish with television, a separate dish was built at the studio. The station grew large enough to qualify for Corporation for Public Broadcasting funding and started broadcasting a local radio reading service.

The WNIN stations finally moved downtown after Southwest Indiana Public Broadcasting acquired the historic Willard Carpenter House in 1985. WNIN built an annex behind the home to serve as the television studio; administrative and radio staff moved into the home portion. In 1993, WNIN-FM began 24-hour broadcasting by taking the national Music Through the Night service, using equipment it purchased with a federal grant.

By 2010, WNIN-FM aired talk programs through the day on weekdays, with classical music airing at night. Research showed that the station's listeners sought more news and talk programming, leading to an expansion of local news.

With the aid of a donor, WNIN acquired the building at 44 Main Street, formerly home to WEVV-TV, in 2017. It sought to relocate because the historic Carpenter house had high upkeep costs and was in a less accessible area of downtown. Unlike the house, 44 Main had been built for broadcasting by WEVV in 1990. The site previously used by the WEVV news studio was converted into a 50-seat public theater for screening PBS programs and events. The Carpenter house was left nearly abandoned until it was purchased in 2023 to house a real estate firm.

WNIN-FM received a national Edward R. Murrow Award in 2020 for its bilingual program ¿Qué Pasa Midwest?. In 2025, Congress rescinded funding for the Corporation for Public Broadcasting, at the same time that Indiana lawmakers defunded public media in the state. At the time, nearly 35 percent of WNIN's revenue came from the corporation. In response, WNIN laid off five employees, but most of the on-air cuts were made to television, not radio.

== Local programming ==
WNIN produces a variety of local programs and podcasts. Two Main Street with David James is an interview series, and Inside the Music covers arts and culture including the Evansville Philharmonic Orchestra. WNIN-FM is also the home of the Philharmonic's concerts. Overnight, the station airs Classical Noyes, recordings of classical music programs hosted by former WNIN executive Jean Noyes which were digitized in 2023.

== Notable presenters ==
- Walter Wangerin Jr. — host of The Daily Reader, 1990
