= WEVV-TV =

Television station in Evansville, Indiana

- Evansville, Indiana; United States
- Channels: Digital: 28 (UHF); Virtual: 44
- Branding: 44.1: CBS44; 44.2: Fox44

Programming
- Affiliations: 44.1: CBS; 44.2: Fox/MyNetworkTV; for others, see § Subchannels

Ownership
- Owner: Gray Media; (Gray Television Licensee, LLC)
- Sister stations: WFIE

History
- First air date: November 17, 1983
- Former channel numbers: Analog: 44 (UHF, 1983–2009); Digital: 45 (UHF, 2006–2019)
- Former affiliations: Independent (1983–1986); Fox (1986–1995)
- Call sign meaning: Evansville ("EVV" is also the IATA code for Evansville Regional Airport)

Technical information
- Licensing authority: FCC
- Facility ID: 72041
- ERP: 243 kW
- HAAT: 310.7 m (1,019 ft)
- Transmitter coordinates: 37°53′17.2″N 87°32′37″W
- Translator(s): WEEV-LD 47.1 Evansville (relays 44.2)

Links
- Public license information: Public file; LMS

WEVV-TV (channel 44) is a television station in Evansville, Indiana, United States, affiliated with CBS, Fox, and MyNetworkTV. It is owned by Gray Media alongside NBC affiliate WFIE (channel 14). WEVV-TV's studios are located on Carpenter and Bond streets in downtown Evansville, and its transmitter is at John James Audubon State Park in Henderson, Kentucky.

WEVV-TV began broadcasting on November 17, 1983, as an independent station. Put on the air by local investors, it was owned from 1985 to 1999 by Ralph C. Wilson Industries. The station became affiliated with Fox in 1986, moved to new downtown studio facilities in 1990, and launched a local news department in 1992, initially providing the market's first 9 p.m. local newscast. In 1995, a three-station affiliation switch resulted in WEVV becoming a CBS affiliate. Wilson sold the station to Communications Corporation of America (ComCorp) in 1999; it was ComCorp's only broadcast property outside of Texas and Louisiana. The news department was shuttered due to low ratings in July 2001.

In 2011, an affiliation dispute led to WEVV becoming the Fox affiliate again, this time on its 44.2 subchannel. After Bayou City Broadcasting acquired WEVV in 2014, it moved the station into its present facilities and relaunched local news in August 2015. The station was sold to Allen Media Group in 2019 and to Gray Media in 2026.

== Early years ==
=== Construction and launch ===
South Central Broadcasting, the owner of Evansville radio station WIKY, applied to the Federal Communications Commission (FCC) in November 1978 for authority to build a new commercial TV station in Evansville on channel 44. South Central planned an independent station heavy on sports coverage and possibly featuring a news department. However, as the owner of an existing radio station, South Central needed a waiver to own a UHF TV station and a radio station in the same market. At the deadline in May 1979, Family TV, Inc. applied for the channel. They proposed a family-oriented station emphasizing programming free of sex and violence as well as sports. Though one of its organizers was a reverend, the proposed Family TV station would not be religious in character. Believing it would have a hard time at comparative hearing because of its need to seek a waiver in a costly proceeding, South Central withdrew its application in November 1980.

Family TV had not built the station by July 1982, when Dick Shively was hired to help start the operation. Shively's extensive experience in broadcasting, including in Evansville, was deemed necessary because lenders were unwilling to lend capital to the company due to its lack of track record. In early 1983, Shively and two other investors acquired 49 percent of the construction permit, which then bore the call sign WAFV ("American Family Viewing"). With its new investors, channel 44 secured the rights to telecast Evansville Purple Aces athletic events, beating out NBC affiliate WFIE (channel 14) by offering to air more basketball games. Shively also arranged for the call sign to be changed to WEVV, over the objections of WEHT. The transfer of partial ownership and a loan agreement were not timely notified to the FCC, resulting in a fine assessed in 1984.

After the first attempt to sign on November 10 was scrapped due to moisture in the transmission line, WEVV debuted on November 17, 1983. It had offices in the Executive Inn in Evansville and a transmitter site south of the Ohio River five miles (8.0 km) east of U.S. 41 in Henderson, Kentucky. Its programming consisted of cartoons, syndicated programs, and movies.

=== Ralph Wilson ownership, Fox affiliation and news launch ===
After receiving several offers, ownership sold WEVV to Ralph C. Wilson Industries of Detroit, the owner of the Buffalo Bills of the NFL, for $4.36 million in a deal announced in 1985. After Wilson closed on the purchase in February 1986, the station began airing newer movies and updated its image alongside acquiring new equipment. However, that same year, WEVV lost the bidding for Purple Aces athletics to WFIE. The station affiliated with the Fox network upon its October 1986 launch.

From the moment Wilson purchased WEVV, the company sought to build studios in a high-visibility area of Evansville to raise channel 44's profile alongside increased community involvement. The company scouted several sites before choosing a downtown property at Main Street and Riverside Drive. Plans were approved in February 1989, in spite of a consultant report that riverfront development be more engaging with the waterfront than WEVV planned. The station moved into the studios at 44 Main Street in January 1990. Station management hoped that the new, 14,000-square-foot (1,300 m^{2}) facility would help the station capture more commercial production business.

The new studio facility was also home to a major expansion. General manager Skip Simms, who had desired to add news since he assumed the position in 1989 and had tried to do so sooner, announced in October 1991 that the station would produce an hour-long 9 p.m. local newscast on weeknights. At the time, nearby large-market Fox affiliates in Indianapolis (WXIN) and Louisville (WDRB) had both started newscasts in recent years. Fox 44 News at 9 debuted on February 23, 1992. WEVV, with the first new local news department in Evansville since WTVW (channel 7) began broadcasting in 1956, aimed to deliver longer-form, more detail-oriented stories on local news and issues. In April 1993, WEVV expanded to Sunday night news; the 30-minute program was higher-rated, leading the station to change its weeknight newscasts to a half-hour two months later.

WEVV expanded in 1993 by starting a new low-power TV station with programming focused on sports: W63BT "TSN", specializing in sports programming.

== As a CBS affiliate ==
=== Switch to CBS ===
In May 1995, Banam Broadcasting, a subsidiary of BankAmerica, sold WTVW to Petracom Broadcasting. Fox then acquired a 20% equity stake in Petracom. Even though WEVV's Fox affiliation agreement did not expire until December 1998, an affiliation switch was underway. WEHT, the CBS affiliate, moved to acquire the ABC affiliation vacated by WTVW. That left CBS without an affiliate in the market until it signed an affiliation agreement with WEVV at the end of June.

The switch took place December 4, 1995. However, some CBS programs moved to channel 44 earlier as WEHT dropped them to pick up ABC programming dropped by WTVW. Programs including The Price Is Right, The Late Late Show, and CBS This Morning moved to channel 44 earlier than other CBS shows. Many syndicated programs channel 44 no longer had time to air with its commitments to CBS's larger program lineup were moved to TSN.

Switching to CBS also brought changes to the news department. The station did not air a 6 p.m. newscast, presenting an early report at 5 p.m. and counterprogramming the other stations with reruns of The Simpsons. The early news-and-interviews program, known as 44 at 5, fared poorly in the ratings and was converted to a regular 5 p.m. newscast in July 1996. From 1995 to 1998, WEVV and Owensboro, Kentucky–based Century Communications collaborated on a 9 p.m., cable-only newscast covering Owensboro news.

=== ComCorp ownership and news department shutdown ===
With a market bearing high prices for television stations, Ralph C. Wilson hired a broker to analyze the sale of WEVV in September 1998. Communications Corporation of America (ComCorp) acquired the station in February 1999 for $27.5 million, marking the company's only broadcast holding outside the states of Texas and Louisiana.

WEVV-TV shut down its news department on the afternoon of July 17, 2001. ComCorp management found that the ratings performance for news had fallen below the entertainment programming the station offered: ComCorp spokesman Tim Lynch told the Evansville Courier & Press, "It was just a decision we made, and it's kind of a situation where the viewing public in Evansville has said that they love our entertainment programming. They did not like our news." Forty employees were dismissed, some of them having an inkling that the news department was receiving fewer and fewer resources.

ComCorp put its stations on the market in 2005 ahead of filing for Chapter 11 bankruptcy protection the next year, unable to reach debt repayment deals with its lenders. That August, WEVV began broadcasting a digital high-definition signal. WTSN-LP, which became a MyNetworkTV affiliate, was broadcast as subchannel 44.2. WTSN and WEVV parted ways in 2009, with the former becoming an America One affiliate.

WEVV-TV ended regular programming on its analog signal, over UHF channel 44, on June 12, 2009, the official digital television transition date. The station's digital signal remained on its pre-transition UHF channel 45.

== As a dual affiliate ==
WEVV-DT2's first logo as "Fox 44", used from July 1, 2011, to July 1, 2015.

In 2010, Fox and Nexstar Broadcasting Group, owner of WTVW, entered into a dispute over affiliation fees. Nexstar and Fox were in negotiations for nearly a year as Fox sought further fees to give it a share of stations' retransmission consent earnings, a practice to which some station groups objected. On May 11, 2011, Fox announced it had signed a new affiliation agreement to move its programming to the 44.2 subchannel of WEVV effective July 1. To provide a high-definition feed of the 44.2 subchannel to antenna viewers in Evansville, Henderson, and Owensboro, as well as cable and satellite providers, WEVV-TV activated low-power station W47EE-D ahead of the affiliation switch. What had been known as My44 became Fox44 with the switch, though MyNetworkTV programming simply moved from 7–9 p.m. to 9–11 p.m.

=== Bayou City Broadcasting ownership and news relaunch ===
On April 24, 2013, Communications Corporation of America announced the sale of its stations to Nexstar, which now owned WEHT and operated WTVW, for $270 million. Under FCC rules, duopolies were not permissible in a market with fewer than eight full-power TV stations. Instead, Nexstar originally opted to sell WEVV to Rocky Creek Communications, Inc. a company founded by Shirley Green; Nexstar would have operated the station under a shared services agreement (SSA), bringing it under common operation with WEHT and WTVW. However, the deal came as the FCC began closely scrutinizing sharing agreements between two or more television stations within the same market. With the ComCorp sale still pending, Nexstar changed tack. It announced on August 4, 2014, that it would instead sell WEVV to The Woodlands, Texas–based Bayou City Broadcasting (owned by DuJuan McCoy, who is African American) for $18.6 million. Bayou City assumed control at the start of January 2015 and within a week entered into a carriage dispute with Dish Network over retransmission consent fees which lasted for nearly a month.

Bayou City ownership brought major changes to WEVV. It moved out of the Main Street studio and to WTVW's former studios on Carpenter Street, which had sat vacant since that station merged into WEHT; the Main Street facility is now occupied by public broadcasting WNIN-FM and WNIN TV, which moved in during 2017. The move coincided with the return of local news to channel 44. Before taking control, McCoy announced his intention to restore newscasts for the first time since 2001. The newscasts premiered on August 3, 2015, consisting of morning news (4:30 to 7 a.m. on CBS and Fox and 7 to 9 a.m. on Fox alone) plus half-hour noon, 5 p.m., 6 p.m., and 10 p.m. broadcasts on CBS and an hour-long 9 p.m. newscast on Fox.

=== Allen Media Group and Gray Media ownership ===
On May 6, 2019, it was announced that Los Angeles–based Entertainment Studios, headed by entertainment entrepreneur Byron Allen, would purchase the Bayou City stations for $165 million. The sale was completed on July 31, 2019.

On January 17, 2025, Allen Media Group announced plans to cut local meteorologist/weather forecaster positions from its stations, including WEVV, and replacing them with a "weather hub" produced by The Weather Channel, which the company also owns. The decision was reversed within a week by management in response to "viewer and advertiser reaction". Amid financial woes and rising debt, Allen Media Group announced on June 1 that it would explore strategic options, such as a sale of its television stations. On August 8, it was announced that AMG would sell a package of stations including WEVV and WEEV-LD to Gray Media for $171 million; in the Evansville market, this would create a duopoly with WFIE, the second duopoly in this market after the WTVW-WEHT duopoly. The sale was completed on May 1, 2026.

== Notable former on-air staff ==
- Adam Alexander – sportscaster, late 1990s

== Subchannels ==
WEVV-TV's transmitter is located at John James Audubon State Park in Henderson, Kentucky. The station's signal is multiplexed:

Subchannels of WEVV-TV
Subchannel	Res.	Short name	Programming
44.1	1080i	CBS44	CBS
44.2	720p	FOX44	Fox & MyNetworkTV
44.3	480i	QVC	QVC
44.4	480i	HSN	HSN
44.5	480i	SHOPLC	Shop LC

WEEV-LD carries the Fox subchannel on a standalone basis:

Subchannel of WEEV-LD
Subchannel	Res.	Short name	Programming
47.1	720p	FOX44	Fox & MyNetworkTV
