= Gun TV =

- Country: United States
- Broadcast area: Nationwide (via cable TV)
- Headquarters: Coachella Valley, California

Programming
- Language: English

Ownership
- Owner: Social Responsibility Network, LLC

History
- Launched: April 1, 2016; 10 years ago
- Closed: January 9, 2017; 9 years ago

Links
- Website: guntv.tv

Gun TV was a short-lived American shopping channel that allowed buyers to purchase firearms through the traditional home shopping television format. By coincidence and with some accompanying criticism, the network's launch announcement came out around the same time as the San Bernardino shootings occurred.

The network mainly operated through a website live stream, along with an overnight over-the-air feed carried by networks such as the American Sports Network's 24/7 service, Tuff TV, Pursuit Channel and FightTV. However, the concept proved to be unsuccessful, and the network ended operations on January 9, 2017, only nine months after its April 1, 2016 launch. Gun TV would continue to air hour-long paid programming blocks overnights on Pursuit Channel after that date until mid-April 2017, when the company's social media accounts went dormant, with its website following soon after.

== Business model ==
Unlike other shopping channels, Gun TV would not ship any products directly to customers in order to comply with Bureau of Alcohol, Tobacco, Firearms and Explosives regulations; instead, the customer would pick up their purchase at the nearest federally licensed dealer, which completed the necessary NICS background checks and paperwork. The firearms were shipped to the dealer via Louisiana-based wholesaler Sports South.

As it is illegal to fire a weapon inside a studio in California, Gun TV featured inactive weapons and unloaded firearms in the studio, combined with out-of-studio demonstrations of the firearms with former law enforcement and military personnel, along with popular markspersons, such as ex-Olympic shooters and contestants from the History competitive shooting series Top Shot among those showing off the features of the offered weaponry.

== Links ==
- Gun TV official website
- Gun TV out of ammo after less than year on air // USA Today, Jan 12, 2017
