= Get After It Media =

American television broadcast company

Get After It Media LLC
- Formerly: Luken Communications (2008–2019); Reach High Media Group (2019–2021)
- Type: Private
- Industry: Broadcast television
- Founded: 2008; 18 years ago
- Founder: Henry Luken III
- Headquarters: Chattanooga, Tennessee, U.S.
- Area served: Nationwide
- Key people: Joel Wertman
- Products: Television stations; Digital broadcast television networks
- Owner: Henry Luken III
- Number of employees: 50 (2010)
- Subsidiaries: Heartland; Hasbro Legends; Retro TV; The Family Channel; Rev'n Action
- Website: getafteritmedia.com

Get After It Media LLC, formerly known as Luken Communications and Reach High Media Group, is a privately owned American broadcast holding company, based in Chattanooga, Tennessee, which owns or operates around 80 television stations in the United States and five digital television multicast networks. The flagship station of the company is located in Chattanooga with the low-power station, WOOT-LD.

== History ==
Luken Communications was formed in 2008 by Henry Luken III, formerly president and CEO of Equity Media Holdings. Luken Communications agreed to purchase six TV stations from Equity Media for $17.5 million and paid a $5 million installment with the rest pending on regulatory approval. In June 2008, Equity sold to Luken Retro Television Network for $18.5 million and $8.05 million Equity warrants for $1.5 million.

On January 4, 2009, a contract conflict between Equity and Luken Communications interrupted RTN programming on many of its affiliates with Luken alleging that Equity had left many obligations to RTN's creditors, including programming suppliers, unpaid. As a result, Luken restored a national feed of the network from its Chattanooga headquarters. As a result of this dispute, Luken pulled out of a deal to purchase Equity's stations in southwestern Florida.

In June 2009, Luken and Seals Entertainment Company LLC launched the male-oriented digital multicast channel Tuff TV. On March 22, 2011, Luken became part-owners of My Family TV in a joint venture with existing owner ValCom (the network later rebranded as The Family Channel after ValCom and Luken Communications ended their partnership). In June 2011, Luken Communications announced the purchase of 78 low-power translator stations from the Minority Media and Telecommunications Council for $390,000; the purchase was made in order to expand coverage of its ten existing and planned digital multicast networks with hopes to eventually acquire 400 low-power stations. In late summer 2011, Luken and Classic Media launched PBJ, featuring classic children's programs from the Classic Media library. With Frost Cutlery's shopping network and outdoor shows, Luken launched in 2011 the Frost Great Outdoors network.

On April 16, 2012, Luken Communications and Jim Owens Entertainment announced that the companies had teamed to relaunch The Nashville Network as a digital broadcast television network set for a late summer 2012 launch (TNN previously existed as a cable channel started by Gaylord Entertainment Company in 1983). The network was rebranded the next year as Heartland.

On June 21, 2013, an Arkansas jury awarded a $47.4 million verdict against Luken Communications for a claim of fraudulent transfer of the ownership of RTV six years prior. In order to appeal, Luken Communications filed for Chapter 11 bankruptcy as a protection measure. The appeal spanned more than a year but was ultimately successful, and in October 2014, the company announced it was emerging from bankruptcy protection and continued to grow and expand its network offerings. In December 2014, Luken Communications launched a new digital network, Rev'n, with a focus on automotive enthusiasts.

In December 2019, Luken Communications rebranded as Reach High Media Group, as Joel Wertman had by then taken over as president and CEO of the company from Luken. It again rebranded in early 2021 to Get After It Media, with Wertman remaining as president; in March 2021, the company launched a new streaming platform known as It's Real Good TV.

On April 13, 2026, Hasbro Entertainment announced a partnership with Get After It Media to launch Hasbro Legends, a new digital and FAST channel focused on series from its legacy franchises, such as G.I. Joe, My Little Pony, Power Rangers, and Transformers.

On April 22, 2026, it was announced that The Action Channel and Rev'n would be merged to form Rev'n Action. The relaunch took effect on May 4.

== Assets owned by Get After It Media ==
=== Digital multicast networks ===
- Heartland, formerly The Nashville Network
- Hasbro Legends
- Retro TV
- The Family Channel
- Rev'n Action

=== Broadcast television stations ===
List of stations owned by Get After It Media (d/b/a Digital Networks, LLC)
City of license / Market	State	Station	VC	Subchannels	FID
Birmingham	Alabama	WSWH-LD	22.1; 22.2; 22.3; 22.4; 22.5; 22.6; 22.7	Heartland; Retro TV; Hasbro Legends; Rev'n Action; The Family Channel; Revival Ministries; Greater Love TV	1008
Huntsville	Alabama	WNAL-LD	27.1; 27.2; 27.3; 27.4; 27.5; 27.6; 27.7	Heartland; Retro TV; Hasbro Legends; Rev'n Action; The Family Channel; Revival Ministries; Greater Love TV	67953
Phoenix	Arizona	K23PL-D	23	Silent	68020
Little Rock	Arkansas	WPYM-LD	38.1	Jewelry TV	129503
Chico–Redding	California	KXCH-LD	19.1; 19.2; 19.3; 19.4; 19.5; 19.6; 19.7	Heartland; Retro TV; Hasbro Legends; Rev'n Action; The Family Channel; Revival Ministries; Greater Love TV	68097
Denver	Colorado	KAVC-LD	48.1; 48.2; 48.3; 48.4; 48.5; 48.6; 48.7	Heartland; Retro TV; Hasbro Legends; Rev'n Action; The Family Channel; Revival Ministries; Greater Love TV	68077
Gainesville	Florida	WFGZ-LD	22.1; 22.2; 22.3; 22.4; 22.5; 22.6; 22.7	Heartland; Retro TV; Hasbro Legends; Rev'n Action; The Family Channel; Revival Ministries; Greater Love TV	189670
Jacksonville	Florida	WJVF-LD	23.1; 23.2; 23.3; 23.4; 23.5; 23.6; 23.7	Heartland; Retro TV; Hasbro Legends; Rev'n Action; The Family Channel; Revival Ministries; Greater Love TV	190202
Tampa	Florida	WDNP-LD	36.1; 36.2; 36.3; 36.4; 36.5; 36.6; 36.7	Heartland; Retro TV; Hasbro Legends; Rev'n Action; The Family Channel; Revival Ministries; Greater Love TV	67986
Columbus	Georgia	WXVK-LD	30.1; 30.2; 30.3; 30.4; 30.5; 30.6; 30.7	Heartland; Retro TV; Hasbro Legends; Rev'n Action; The Family Channel; Revival Ministries; Greater Love TV	58773
Savannah	Georgia	WSVG-LD	23.1; 23.2; 23.3; 23.4; 23.5; 23.6; 23.7	Heartland; Retro TV; Hasbro Legends; Rev'n Action; The Family Channel; Revival Ministries; Greater Love TV	129370
Idaho Falls–Pocatello	Idaho	KPTO-LD	41.1; 41.2; 41.3; 41.4; 41.5; 41.6; 41.7	Heartland; Retro TV; Hasbro Legends; Rev'n Action; The Family Channel; Revival Ministries; Greater Love TV	67918
Peoria–Bloomington	Illinois	WSIO-LD	51.1; 51.2; 51.3; 51.4; 51.5; 51.6; 51.7	Heartland; Retro TV; Hasbro Legends; Rev'n Action; The Family Channel; Revival Ministries; Greater Love TV	1013
Indianapolis	Indiana	W20FE-D	21.1; 21.2; 21.3; 21.4; 21.5; 21.6; 21.7	Heartland; Retro TV; Hasbro Legends; Rev'n Action; The Family Channel; Revival Ministries; Greater Love TV	68035
Davenport	Iowa	W35DY-D	19	Silent	1006
Des Moines	Iowa	K31PO-D	44	Silent	67879
Wichita	Kansas	K30RF-D	30.1; 30.2; 30.3; 30.4; 30.5; 30.6; 30.7	Heartland; Retro TV; Hasbro Legends; Rev'n Action; The Family Channel; Revival Ministries; Greater Love TV	56518
Baton Rouge	Louisiana	WRUG-LD	50.1; 50.2; 50.3; 50.4; 50.5; 50.6; 50.7	Heartland; Retro TV; Hasbro Legends; Rev'n Action; The Family Channel; Revival Ministries; Greater Love TV	190207
Shreveport	Louisiana	KVPO-LD	30.1; 30.2; 30.3; 30.4; 30.5; 30.6; 30.7	Heartland; Retro TV; Hasbro Legends; Rev'n Action; The Family Channel; Revival Ministries; Greater Love TV	60814
Minneapolis	Minnesota	KKTW-LD	19.1; 19.2; 19.3; 19.4; 19.5; 19.6; 19.7	Heartland; Retro TV; Hasbro Legends; Rev'n Action; The Family Channel; Revival Ministries; Greater Love TV	68054
Rochester	Minnesota	K27OW-D	40	Silent	129454
Columbus–Tupelo	Mississippi	WLMS-LD	25.1; 25.2; 25.3; 25.4; 25.5; 25.6; 25.7	Heartland; Retro TV; Hasbro Legends; Rev'n Action; The Family Channel; Revival Ministries; Greater Love TV	68080
Joplin	Missouri	KJLN-LD	50.1; 50.2; 50.3; 50.4; 50.5; 50.6; 50.7	Heartland; Retro TV; Hasbro Legends; Rev'n Action; The Family Channel; Revival Ministries; Greater Love TV	190289
Kansas City	Missouri	K26PI-D	15	Silent	68040
Springfield	Missouri	K29OM-D	41.1; 41.2; 41.3; 41.4; 41.5; 41.6; 41.7	Heartland; Retro TV; Hasbro Legends; Rev'n Action; The Family Channel; Revival Ministries; Greater Love TV	68046
Las Vegas	Nevada	KVGA-LD	51.1; 51.2; 51.3; 51.4; 51.5; 51.6; 51.7	Heartland; Retro TV; Hasbro Legends; Rev'n Action; The Family Channel; Revival Ministries; Greater Love TV	67974
Albuquerque–Santa Fe	New Mexico	KWHY-LD	36	Silent	129009
Albuquerque–Santa Fe	New Mexico	K33OB-D	50	Silent	129875
Buffalo	New York	WBUO-LD	30.1; 30.2; 30.3; 30.4; 30.5; 30.6; 30.7	Heartland; Retro TV; Hasbro Legends; Rev'n Action; The Family Channel; Revival Ministries; Greater Love TV	68012
Greenville	North Carolina	WJGC-LD	33.1; 33.2; 33.3; 33.4; 33.5; 33.6; 33.7	Heartland; Retro TV; Hasbro Legends; Rev'n Action; The Family Channel; Revival Ministries; Greater Love TV	189742
Raleigh–Durham	North Carolina	WDRH-LD	16.1; 16.2; 16.3; 16.4; 16.5; 16.6; 16.7	Heartland; Retro TV; Hasbro Legends; Rev'n Action; The Family Channel; Revival Ministries; Greater Love TV	67783
Fargo–Valley City	North Dakota	KFGX-LD	35.1; 35.2; 35.3; 35.4; 35.5; 35.6; 35.7	Heartland; Retro TV; Hasbro Legends; Rev'n Action; The Family Channel; Revival Ministries; Greater Love TV	68013
Minot	North Dakota	K21GQ-D	21	Silent	129668
Minot	North Dakota	K28QQ-D	40	Silent	68087
Omaha	Nebraska	K36QD-D	21	Silent	68018
Zanesville	Ohio	WOOH-LD	29.1; 29.2; 29.3; 29.4; 29.5; 29.6; 29.7	Heartland; Retro TV; Hasbro Legends; Rev'n Action; The Family Channel; Revival Ministries; Greater Love TV	190268
Oklahoma City	Oklahoma	K34RL-D	33.1; 33.2; 33.3; 33.4; 33.5; 33.6; 33.7	Heartland; Retro TV; Hasbro Legends; Rev'n Action; The Family Channel; Revival Ministries; Greater Love TV	68085
Tulsa	Oklahoma	KTUO-LD	22.1; 22.2; 22.3; 22.4; 22.5; 22.6; 22.7	Heartland; Retro TV; Hasbro Legends; Rev'n Action; The Family Channel; Revival Ministries; Greater Love TV	190113
Scranton	Pennsylvania	WSRG-LD	59.1; 59.2; 59.3; 59.4; 59.5; 59.6; 59.7	Heartland; Retro TV; Hasbro Legends; Rev'n Action; The Family Channel; Revival Ministries; Greater Love TV	68090
Charleston	South Carolina	WLOW-LD	19.1; 19.2; 19.3; 19.4; 19.5; 19.6; 19.7	Heartland; Retro TV; Hasbro Legends; Rev'n Action; The Family Channel; Revival Ministries; Greater Love TV	190344
Spartanburg–Greenville	South Carolina	WASV-LD	50.1; 50.2; 50.3; 50.4; 50.5; 50.6; 50.7	Heartland; Retro TV; Hasbro Legends; Rev'n Action; The Family Channel; Revival Ministries; Greater Love TV	47722
Spartanburg–Greenville	South Carolina	WNGS-LD	50.1; 50.2; 50.3; 50.4; 50.5; 50.6; 50.7	Heartland; Retro TV; Hasbro Legends; Rev'n Action; The Family Channel; Revival Ministries; Greater Love TV	190222
Rapid City	South Dakota	KRPC-LP	33.1; 33.2; 33.3; 33.4; 33.5; 33.6; 33.7	Heartland; Retro TV; Hasbro Legends; Rev'n Action; The Family Channel; Revival Ministries; Greater Love TV	68066
Sioux Falls	South Dakota	KSXF-LD	56.1; 56.2; 56.3; 56.4; 56.5; 56.6; 56.7	Heartland; Retro TV; Hasbro Legends; Rev'n Action; The Family Channel; Revival Ministries; Greater Love TV	67998
Chattanooga	Tennessee	WOOT-LD	6.1; 6.2; 6.3; 6.4; 6.5; 6.6; 6.7	Heartland; Retro TV; Hasbro Legends; Rev'n Action; The Family Channel; Revival Ministries; Greater Love TV	31862
Knoxville	Tennessee	WKXT-LD	34.1; 34.2; 34.3; 34.4; 34.5; 34.6; 34.7	Heartland; Retro TV; Hasbro Legends; Rev'n Action; The Family Channel; Revival Ministries; Greater Love TV	67926
Nashville	Tennessee	WWHL-LD	27.1; 27.2; 27.3; 27.4; 27.5; 27.6; 27.7	Heartland; Retro TV; Hasbro Legends; Rev'n Action; The Family Channel; Revival Ministries; Greater Love TV	995
San Antonio	Texas	K24OJ-D	15	Silent	68042
San Antonio	Texas	K20PG-D	20.1; 20.2; 20.3; 20.4; 20.5; 20.6; 20.7	Heartland; Retro TV; Hasbro Legends; Rev'n Action; The Family Channel; Revival Ministries; Greater Love TV	68095
Wichita Falls	Texas	K16OF-D	49	Silent	67912
Charleston–Huntington	West Virginia	WHWV-LD	45.1; 45.2; 45.3; 45.4; 45.5; 45.6; 45.7	Heartland; Retro TV; Hasbro Legends; Rev'n Action; The Family Channel; Revival Ministries; Greater Love TV	68037
Green Bay	Wisconsin	W21EF-D	8	Silent	67935
Wausau–Rhinelander	Wisconsin	K18NQ-D	32	Silent	129701
