= Heartland (TV network) =

American country music-oriented digital broadcast television network

- Headquarters: Chattanooga–Nashville, Tennessee

Ownership
- Owner: Get After It Media

History
- Launched: November 1, 2012; 13 years ago
- Former names: The Nashville Network (2012–2013)

Links
- Website: watchheartlandtv.com

Heartland is an American country music-oriented digital broadcast television network owned by Get After It Media and broadcast out of Chattanooga, Tennessee. Launched on April 16, 2012, the network began as a revival of The Nashville Network (TNN); the original incarnation (now known as Paramount Network) existed as a basic cable and satellite television network from March 7, 1983, to September 24, 2000.

== History ==
On April 16, 2012, Luken Communications (now known as Reach High Media Group) and Jim Owens Entertainment announced a joint venture to relaunch The Nashville Network as a digital broadcast television network on November 1, 2012 with the network to carry much of the original TNN's programming, including Music City Tonight, Crook & Chase, Yesteryear and (in cooperation with the Country Music Hall of Fame) Nashville Now, as well as new and original programming.

In October 2013, the partnership between Jim Owens Entertainment and Luken Communications ended and the network was rebranded as Heartland, carrying much of the same programming and format.

== Programming ==
Programming that aired on the new Nashville Network included shows such as Nashville Now, Crook & Chase, Music City Tonight, The Rick and Bubba Show, and Larry's Country Diner. Much of the same programming continued to air after the rebrand to Heartland. New series added to the network include Rise Up Country with John Ritter, Reflections, Positively Paula (hosted by Paula Deen), the Canadian drama series Heartland, reruns of Canadian sketch comedy The Red Green Show (added September 2018), More Than the Music, The Unseen World, and Morning Beats, a soft news magazine which replaced Coffee, Country & Cody from WSM Radio in Nashville. Country music videos air when no other programs are scheduled; both contemporary videos and classic country performances are offered, usually presented in blocks by VJs. Coincidentally the network carries the Canadian series Heartland in repeats, with the only connection between the two a shared name.

Heartland's national feed contains no infomercials except for a regularly scheduled presentation brokered by Time-Life Home Video.

== Distribution ==
Heartland is distributed through digital subchannel affiliations. The network is also distributed freely over the Internet; some of the network's programming (including Jim Owens entertainment shows and programming made available online elsewhere behind a paywall) is not available online and is replaced with reruns of programs scheduled at other times. Since 2019, the online feed has operated a full schedule.

== Affiliates ==
List of Heartland affiliates
Media market	State/District	Station	Channel
Alexander City	Alabama	WAXC-LD	31.1
Dothan	Alabama	WJJN-LD	49.3
Tuscaloosa	Alabama	WSWH-LD	22.1
Scottsboro	Alabama	WNAL-LD	27.1
Phoenix	Arizona	KFPB-LD	31.5
Fayetteville	Arkansas	K28NT-D	48.1
Little Rock	Arkansas	KLRA-CD	20.8
Texarkana	Arkansas	KLFI-CD	35.4
Chico–Redding	California	KXCH-LD	19.1
Chico–Redding	California	KKRM-LD	x.9
Los Angeles	California	KWHY	63.2
Lucerne Valley	California	KVVB-LD	33.4
San Diego	California	KSDY-LD	50.5
San Francisco	California	KUKR-LD	x.9
Cortez	Colorado	K21LC-D	21.3
Denver	Colorado	KAVC-LD	48.1
Hartford, CT	Connecticut	WHNH-CD	2.2
Washington	District of Columbia	WMDE	36.3
Gainesville	Florida	WFGZ-LD	22.1
Jacksonville	Florida	WJVF-LD	23.1
Jacksonville	Florida	WQXT-CD	22.4
Orlando	Florida	WZXZ-CD	36.4
St. Petersburg–Tampa	Florida	WDNP-LD	36.1
Atlanta	Georgia	WDNV-LD	12.4
Columbus	Georgia	WXVK-LD	30.1
Savannah	Georgia	W31FE-D	23.1
Pocatello–Twin Falls	Idaho	KPTO-LD	41.1
Champaign–Urbana	Illinois	WBXC-CD	18.1
Chicago	Illinois	WJYS	62.4
Evansville	Indiana	WTSN-CD	20.2
Indianapolis	Indiana	WSWY-LD	21.1
Des Moines	Iowa	WBXF-CD	28.1
Topeka	Kansas	WROB-LD	25.9
Wichita	Kansas	KSMI-LD	30.1
Louisville	Kentucky	WBON-LD	9.3
Louisville	Kentucky	WRLW-CD	17.1
Baton Rouge	Louisiana	WRUG-LD	50.1
Lake Charles	Louisiana	K21OB-D	21.6
Shreveport	Louisiana	KVPO-LD	30.1
Salisbury	Maryland	W14DK-D	14.7
Boston	Massachusetts	WWDP	46.6
Detroit	Michigan	WHPS-CD	15.5
Flint	Michigan	WXON-LD	9.7
Minneapolis–Saint Paul	Minnesota	KKTW-LD	19.1
Redwood Falls	Minnesota	K16MV-D	16.2
Willmar	Minnesota	K35NR-D	35.1
Joplin	Missouri	KJLN-LD	50.1
Kansas City	Missouri	KCKS-LD	25.9
Springfield	Missouri	KSFZ-LD	41.1
St. Louis	Missouri	KEFN-CD	20.6
Las Vegas	Nevada	KVGA-LD	51.1
Albuquerque	New Mexico	KNMQ-LD	20.1
Albuquerque	New Mexico	KYNM-LD	21.4
Albany	New York	WYBN-LD	14.2
New York City	New York	WZME	43.9
Syracuse	New York	WBLZ-LD	33.6
Utica	New York	WVVC-LD	40.3
Jacksonville–Greenville	North Carolina	WJGC-LD	33.1
Myrtle Beach	North Carolina	WTNG-CD	7.2
Raleigh	North Carolina	WDRH-LD	16.1
Cleveland	Ohio	WIVM-LD	39.6
Zanesville	Ohio	WOOH-LD	29.1
Oklahoma City	Oklahoma	KWRW-LD	33.1
Tulsa	Oklahoma	KTUO-LD	22.1
Cottage Grove	Oregon	K30OC-D	44.5
Kingston	Pennsylvania	WRLD-LD	30.11
Philadelphia	Pennsylvania	WMCN-TV	44.4
Pittsburgh	Pennsylvania	WPTG-CD	69.6
Scranton	Pennsylvania	WSRG-LD	59.1
Charleston	South Carolina	WLOW-LD	19.1
Greenville–Spartanburg	South Carolina	WASV-LD	50.1
Greenville–Spartanburg	South Carolina	WNGS-LD	50.1
Rapid City	South Dakota	KRPC-LP	33.1
Chattanooga	Tennessee	WOOT-LD	6.1
Chattanooga	Tennessee	WDGA-CD	43.1
Chattanooga	Tennessee	WUWT-LD	26.2
Knoxville	Tennessee	WKXT-LD	34.1
Nashville	Tennessee	WWHL-LD	27.1
Nashville	Tennessee	WLLC-LD	42.4
Corpus Christi	Texas	KQSY-LD	30.7
Fort Worth–Dallas	Texas	KFWD	52.2
Houston	Texas	KVQT-LD	21.6
San Antonio	Texas	KRTX-LD	20.1
Salt Lake City	Utah	KPNZ	24.7
Seattle–Tacoma	Washington	KYMU-LD	6.5
Milwaukee	Wisconsin	WTAS-LD	23.5

== See also ==
- Great American Country
- RFD-TV
- Country Music Television
- The Country Network
