= Tuff TV =

American digital broadcast network

- Type: Digital broadcast television network
- Branding: TUFF TV
- Country: United States
- Availability: 33% of US households
- Broadcast area: United States
- Owner: TUFF TV, Inc.; (Seals Media Company)
- Key people: Lou Seals; John Bonner
- Launch date: June 30, 2009
- Dissolved: August 26, 2018

Tuff TV was an American digital broadcast television network targeted at men owned by the Tuff TV, Inc. division of Seals Media Company. Tuff TV launched on June 30, 2009, and ceased operations August 26, 2018.

Tuff TV carried a mixture of sports (combat, motor and some team sport), lifestyle (outdoors, cooking), automotive, dramas, movies and talk show programming geared mainly at a young male audience. The network carried 3 hours of weekly E/I children's programming to comply with federal broadcasting regulations. Stations affiliating with Tuff received five minutes of local advertising per hour.

== History ==
Tuff TV was launched in 2009 as a joint venture between Luken Communications and TUFF TV Media Group LLC. By July 2011, the network's main affiliate base were the Morris Family Broadcasting and NJR TV station groups. In mid-July 2014, Tuff TV started crowdfunding equity on SparkMarket.com to raise Investment capital, but was limited to those living in the state of Georgia.

Tuff agreed to carry some games from the first season of the Fall Experimental Football League in October and November 2014. Tuff relocated their offices to the GPB Media Building in Atlanta on June 8, 2016. On July 15, 2016, Tuff took over its distribution feed from Luken Communications earlier than planned.

In 2017, Tuff TV lost a case in civil court for Fair Labor Standards brought by a former employee.

Tuff TV, along with its parent company Seals Media Company, ceased operations without announcement on August 26, 2018. The company eventually acknowledged the shutdown months later and indicated that they hoped to relaunch the channel by March 31, 2019; that date passed without a relaunch or any further news, and the site has only featured text indicating the network would be 'coming soon' with no set launch date. The network later claimed it would relaunch in 2022 and 2025, but no details about any new affiliation agreements or distribution details (be it as a broadcast subchannel or streaming network) have ever been made public outside of statements teasing those unrealized relaunches.
