= The Family Channel (American TV network, founded 2008) =

American television network

- Type: Broadcast television network
- Country: United States
- Broadcast area: Nationwide via OTA digital television (covering 21% of the U.S.)
- Headquarters: Chattanooga, Tennessee

Programming
- Language: English

Ownership
- Owner: ValCom; Get After It Media

History
- Launched: December 15, 2008; 17 years ago (as My Family TV); December 2013; 12 years ago (as The Family Channel)
- Replaced: Faith TV
- Former names: My Family TV; Faith TV

Links
- Website: www.getafteritmedia.com/fam

The Family Channel is an American general entertainment television network owned by Get After It Media (formerly Luken Communications and Reach High Media Group), and based in Chattanooga, Tennessee.

== History ==
In September 2008, ValCom announced that they would purchase the assets of Faith TV, relaunching it as a more broadly-distributed family television network. On December 15, 2008, ValCom deal to purchase Faith TV closed and they relaunched Faith TV as My Family TV. On October 1, 2009, ValCom completed the purchase of the network after making its final $250,000 payment.

On March 22, 2011, ValCom announced that My Family TV would become a joint venture with Luken Communications. Many of the programs seen on My Family TV, such as Route 66, Lassie, Highway to Heaven and Daniel Boone also aired on sister network RTV.

In December 2013, Luken Communications rebranded MyFamilyTV as The Family Channel. "The Family Channel" name was formerly used by the cable channel owned by Christian Broadcasting Network that became Freeform (now owned by Disney 15 years later) in January 2016; outside of some shared public domain programming once aired in the CBN/Family Channel era of Freeform, the two networks have no relation to each other.

== Affiliates ==
List of The Family Channel affiliates
| Media market | State | Station | Channel |
|---|---|---|---|
| Berry | Alabama | WSFG-LD | 51.5 |
| Birmingham | Alabama | WSWH-LD | 22.5 |
| Dothan | Alabama | WJJN-LD | 49.5 |
| Fayette | Alabama | WSSF-LD | 51.5 |
| Scottsboro | Alabama | WNAL-LD | 27.5 |
| Bentonville | Arkansas | K28NT-D | 48.4 |
| Phoenix | Arizona | KFPB-LD | 31.6 |
| Chico | California | KXCH-LD | 19.5 |
| San Francisco | California | KURK-LD | 27.6 |
| San Rafael | California | KQSL-LD | 27.6 |
| Santa Rosa | California | KUKR-LD | 27.6 |
| Visalia | California | KKDJ-CD | 33.2 |
| Cortez | Colorado | K26CI-D | 27.3 |
| Denver | Colorado | KAVC-LD | 48.5 |
| Dove Creek | Colorado | K32EY-D | 27.3 |
| Jacksonville | Florida | WJVF-LD | 23.5 |
| Lake City | Florida | WFGZ-LD | 22.5 |
| Orlando | Florida | WZXZ-CD | 36.2 |
| Pensacola | Florida | WBQP-CD | 12.4 |
| St. Petersburg | Florida | WDNP-LD | 36.5 |
| Vero Beach | Florida | WMMF-LD | 19.12 |
| Atlanta | Georgia | WDNV-LD | 12.6 |
| Columbus | Georgia | WXVK-LD | 30.5 |
| Savannah | Georgia | W31FE-D | 23.5 |
| Pocatello | Idaho | KPTO-LD | 41.5 |
| Galesburg | Illinois | WSIO-LD | 51.5 |
| Evansville | Indiana | WYYW-CD | 15.2 |
| Indianapolis | Indiana | WSWY-LD | 21.5 |
| Wichita | Kansas | KSMI-LD | 30.5 |
| Louisville | Kentucky | WBNM-LD | 50.10 |
| Baton Rouge | Louisiana | WRUG-LD | 50.5 |
| Shreveport | Louisiana | KVPO-LD | 30.5 |
| Flint | Michigan | WXON-LD | 9.5 |
| Minneapolis | Minnesota | KKTW-LD | 19.5 |
| Willmar | Minnesota | K35NR-D | 35.4 |
| Joplin | Missouri | KJLN-LD | 50.5 |
| Springfield | Missouri | KSFZ-LD | 41.5 |
| Asheville | North Carolina | WASV-LD | 50.5 |
| Jacksonville | North Carolina | WJGC-LD | 33.5 |
| Raleigh | North Carolina | WDRH-LD | 16.5 |
| Atlantic City | New Jersey | WACP | 4.6 |
| Albuquerque | New Mexico | KYNM-CD | 21.1 |
| Las Vegas | Nevada | KVGA-LD | 51.5 |
| Zanesville | Ohio | WOOH-LD | 29.5 |
| Oklahoma City | Oklahoma | KWRW-LD | 33.5 |
| Tulsa | Oklahoma | KTUO-LD | 22.5 |
| Cottage Grove | Oregon | K30OC-D | 44.4 |
| Pittsburgh | Pennsylvania | WBPA-LD | 12.3 |
| Scranton–Wilkes-Barre | Pennsylvania | WSRG-LD | 59.5 |
| Charleston | South Carolina | WLOW-LD | 19.5 |
| Greenville | South Carolina | WNGS-LD | 50.5 |
| Rapid City | South Dakota | KRPC-LP | 33.5 |
| Chattanooga | Tennessee | WOOT-LD | 6.5 |
| Knoxville | Tennessee | WKXT-LD | 34.5 |
| Nashville | Tennessee | WDHC-LD | 11.1 |
| Lufkin | Texas | KLNM-LD | 42.5 |
| San Antonio | Texas | KRTX-LD | 20.5 |
| Wichita Falls | Texas | K30LD-D | 30.1 |
| Wichita Falls | Texas | K24HH-D | 24.3 |
| Logan | Utah | K11XG-D | 15.2 |
| Waukesha | Wisconsin | WTAS-LD | 23.4 |
