= Mayoral elections in Evansville, Indiana =

Elections are held in Evansville, Indiana to elect the city's mayor. Currently, such elections are regularly scheduled to be held every four years, in the year immediately preceding that of United States presidential elections.

== 1934 ==
1934 Evansville, Indiana mayoral election
| Candidate | William H. Dress | Alvan V. Burch |
| Party | Democratic | Republican |
| Popular vote | 22,367 | 18,720 |
| Percentage | 54.44% | 45.56% |
Mayor before election
Frank W. Griese
Elected mayor
William H. Dress
Democratic

The 1934 Evansville, Indiana mayoral election saw the election of Democratic nominee William H. Dress.

1934 Evansville, Indiana mayoral election
| Party | Candidate | Votes | % |
|---|---|---|---|
| Democratic | William H. Dress | 22,367 | 54.44 |
| Republican | Alvan V. Burch | 18,720 | 45.56 |
| Total votes | | 41,087 | 100 |

== 1937 ==
1937 Evansville, Indiana mayoral election
| Candidate | William H. Dress | Alvan V. Burch |
| Party | Democratic | Republican |
| Popular vote | 24,387 | 15,680 |
| Percentage | 70.87% | 39.13% |
Mayor before election
William H. Dress
Democratic
Elected mayor
William H. Dress
Democratic

The 1937 Evansville, Indiana mayoral election saw the reelection of Democratic incumbent William H. Dress.

1937 Evansville, Indiana mayoral election
| Party | Candidate | Votes | % |
|---|---|---|---|
| Democratic | William H. Dress (incumbent) | 24,387 | 70.87 |
| Republican | Alvan V. Burch | 15,680 | 39.13 |
| Total votes | | 40,067 | 100 |

== 1942 ==
1942 Evansville, Indiana mayoral election
| Candidate | Mason Reichert | William H. Dress |
| Party | Republican | Democratic |
| Popular vote | 17,088 | 15,743 |
| Percentage | 52.05% | 47.95% |
Mayor before election
William H. Dress
Democratic
Elected mayor
Mason Reichert
Republican

The 1942 Evansville, Indiana mayoral election saw the election of Republican nominee Mason Reichert, unseating Democratic incumbent William H. Dress.

1942 Evansville, Indiana mayoral election
| Party | Candidate | Votes | % |
|---|---|---|---|
| Republican | Manson Reichert | 17,088 | 52.05 |
| Democratic | William H. Dress (incumbent) | 15,743 | 47.95 |
| Total votes | | 32,831 | 100 |

== 1947 ==
1947 Evansville, Indiana mayoral election
- November 4, 1947
| Candidate | William H. Dress | Manson Reichert |
| Party | Democratic | Republican |
| Popular vote | 22,176 | 17,629 |
| Percentage | 55.71 % | 44.29% |
Mayor before election
Manson Reichert
Republican
Elected mayor
William H. Dress
Democratic

The 1947 Evansville, Indiana mayoral election was held on November 4, 1947, and saw the election of Democrat William H. Dress returned to office for a third nonconsecutive term, unseating Republican incumbent Manson Reichert. Dress was only the second individual in the city's history to win three mayoral elections.

Due to a change in state election law after the previous election, the election was moved to 1947. As a result, the preceding term of incumbent Reichert was extended to 1948, giving him an unprecedented five-year term as mayor before this election.

1947 Evansville, Indiana mayoral election
| Party | Candidate | Votes | % |
|---|---|---|---|
| Democratic | William H. Dress | 22,176 | 55.71 |
| Republican | Manson Reichert (incumbent) | 17,629 | 44.29 |
| Total votes | | 39,805 | 100 |

== 1951 ==
1951 Evansville, Indiana mayoral election
- November 6, 1951
| Candidate | Henry O. Roberts | Edwin F. Diekman |
| Party | Republican | Democratic |
| Popular vote | 24,208 | 17,063 |
| Percentage | 58.66% | 41.34% |
Mayor before election
Edwin F. Diekmann
Democratic
Elected mayor
Henry O. Roberts
Republican

The 1951 Evansville, Indiana mayoral election was held on November 6, 1951, and saw the election of Republican nominee Henry O. Roberts. Roberts defeated Democratic incumbent Edwin F. Diekmann, who had been appointed as mayor following the November 1949 death in office of William H. Dress.

1951 Evansville, Indiana mayoral election
| Party | Candidate | Votes | % |
|---|---|---|---|
| Republican | Henry O. Roberts | 24,208 | 58.66 |
| Democratic | Edwin F. Diekmann (incumbent) | 17,063 | 41.34 |
| Total votes | | 41,271 | 100 |

== 1955 ==
1955 Evansville, Indiana mayoral election
- November 8, 1955
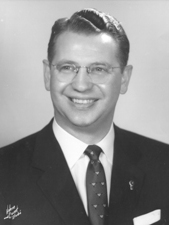

| Candidate | Vance Hartke | Curtis E. Huber |
| Party | Democratic | Republican |
| Popular vote | 25,862 | 21,699 |
| Percentage | 54.12% | 45.40% |
Mayor before election
Henry O. Roberts
Republican
Elected mayor
Vance Hartke
Democratic

The 1955 Evansville, Indiana mayoral election was held on November 8, 1955, and saw the election of Democratic nominee Vance Hartke.

Hartke, the chairman of the Vanderburgh County Democratic Party organization, had faced city recreation director James R. Newcom in the Democratic primary election. The primary was competitive.

In early June, during the general election, thirteen supporters of Hartke's vanquished primary election opponent, Newcom, filed a complaint under Indiana's Corrupt Practices Act of 1945. The complaint related to $8,000 that had been raised by a Jefferson–Jackson Day dinner, which these supporters of Newcom alleged was used to assist Hartke's candidacy, but should instead have been used to assist the Democratic Party in general. The lawsuit alleged that Hartke's campaign manager, Sheriff Frank McDonald, had therefore misused the proceeds from the dinner banquet. The lawsuit was dismissed in late August, after the plaintiffs refused to post a $500 cost bond.

Republican nominee Curtis Huber was a real estate man, who found himself in conflict with the local county Republican Party organization.

The general election campaign between Hartke and Huber was considered to be one of the harshest up to that point in the city's history.

In the coinciding city council election, Hartke's Democratic Party won seven seats, capturing all but two seats (with those two seats coming from wards that were considered to be overwhelmingly Republican-leaning ). The Democratic nominee also won the city clerk race and a race for city judge. At the time, Vanderburgh County (which had voted for the national winner of every previous United States presidential election going back to 1892) was regarded as a political barometer, thus, attention was paid to the Democratic Party landslide in Evansville, the county seat of Vanderburgh County. Ultimately, however, Vanderburgh County, and the nation, would end up voting for the Republican ticket in the subsequent 1956 United States presidential election.

1955 Evansville, Indiana mayoral election
| Party | Candidate | Votes | % |
|---|---|---|---|
| Democratic | R. Vance Hartke | 25,862 | 54.12 |
| Republican | Curtis E. Huber | 21,699 | 45.40 |
| Prohibition | William C. Christmas | 230 | 0.48 |
| Total votes | | 47,791 | 100 |

== 1959 ==
1959 Evansville, Indiana mayoral election
- November 3, 1959
| Candidate | Frank F. McDonald | Donald B. Ingle |
| Party | Democratic | Republican |
| Popular vote | 25,445 | 21,434 |
| Percentage | 54.03% | 45.51% |
Mayor before election
Vance Hartke
Democratic
Elected mayor
Frank F. McDonald
Democratic

The 1959 Evansville, Indiana mayoral election was held on November 3, 1959, and saw the election of Democratic nominee Frank F. McDonald.

1959 Evansville, Indiana mayoral election
| Party | Candidate | Votes | % |
|---|---|---|---|
| Democratic | Frank F. McDonald | 25,445 | 54.03 |
| Republican | Donald B. Ingle | 21,434 | 45.51 |
| Prohibition | J. C. Kelly | 214 | 0.45 |
| Total votes | | 47,093 | 100 |

== 1963 ==
1963 Evansville, Indiana mayoral election
- November 5, 1963
| Nominee | Frank F. McDonald | Henry O. Roberts |
| Party | Democratic | Republican |
| Popular vote | 27,333 | 22,564 |
| Percentage | 54.78% | 45.22% |
Mayor before election
Frank F. McDonald
Democratic
Elected mayor
Frank F. McDonald
Democratic

The 1963 Evansville, Indiana mayoral election was held on November 5, 1963, and saw the reelection of Democratic incumbent Frank F. McDonald. He defeated former mayor Henry O. Roberts, the Republican nominee.

1963 Evansville, Indiana mayoral election
| Party | Candidate | Votes | % |
|---|---|---|---|
| Democratic | Frank F. McDonald (incumbent) | 27,333 | 54.78 |
| Republican | H. O. Roberts | 22,564 | 45.22 |
| Total votes | | 49,897 | 100 |

== 1967 ==
1967 Evansville, Indiana mayoral election
- November 7, 1967
| Nominee | Frank F. McDonald | Henry O. Roberts |
| Party | Democratic | Republican |
| Popular vote | 30,133 | 22,882 |
| Percentage | 56.84 % | 43.16% |
Mayor before election
Frank F. McDonald
Democratic
Elected mayor
Frank F. McDonald
Democratic

The 1967 Evansville, Indiana mayoral election was held on November 7, 1967, and saw the reelection of Democratic incumbent Frank F. McDonald to a third consecutive term. This made him the first mayor to win a third consecutive term in the city's history.

=== Primaries ===
In the May 2 primary elections, incumbent mayor Frank F. McDonald ran unopposed in the Democratic primary, and John Lavens ran unopposed in the Republican primary.

=== General election ===
1963 Evansville, Indiana mayoral election
| Party | Candidate | Votes | % |
|---|---|---|---|
| Democratic | Frank F. McDonald (incumbent) | 30,133 | 56.84 |
| Republican | H. O. Roberts | 22,882 | 43.16 |
| Total votes | | 53,015 | 100 |

== 1971 ==
1971 Evansville, Indiana mayoral election
- November 2, 1971
- Turnout: 70%
| Nominee | Russell G. Lloyd Sr. | William L. Brooks |
| Party | Republican | Democratic |
| Popular vote | 33,063 | 23,905 |
| Percentage | 58.04% | 47.81% |
Mayor before election
Frank F. McDonald
Democratic
Elected mayor
Russell G. Lloyd Sr.
Republican

The 1971 Evansville, Indiana mayoral election was held on November 2, 1971, and saw the election of Republican nominee Russell G. Lloyd Sr.

Incumbent Democrat Frank F. McDonald did not seek reelection to what would have been a fifth term.

=== Primaries ===
Primary elections were held on May 4.

==== Democratic primary ====
City Council president William L. Brooks defeated William Arendell, a former coroner, in the Democratic Party primary. Brooks had boasted the endorsement of outgoing mayor Frank F. McDonald, and was considered the front-runner in the primary.

==== Republican primary ====
Russell G. Lloyd Sr. won the Republican Party primary against a single opponent. Lloyd entered the primary with the support of the local Republican organization.

=== General election ===
At 70%, turnout was considered to be high.

Lloyd's victory, with a 9,158, was considered impressive and surpisingly large. His victory came amid a bad municipal election year for Indiana's Republican Party. Along with the Indianapolis mayoral election, Evansville's election marked one of only two Republican mayoral victories in the state's larger municipal areas with Democrats winning the elections in East Chicago, Fort Wayne, Gary, Hammond, South Bend, and Terre Haute.

In the coinciding city council election, Republicans won 8 seats, and Democrats won one.

The strong Democratic performance came despite outgoing mayor McDonald having been seen, prior to the election, as having established one of the strong city and county Democratic organizations in the state.

1971 Evansville, Indiana mayoral election
| Party | Candidate | Votes | % |
|---|---|---|---|
| Republican | Russell G. Lloyd Sr. | 33,063 | 58.04 |
| Democratic | William L. Brooks | 23,905 | 47.81 |
| Turnout | | 56,968 | 70 |

== 1975 ==
1975 Evansville, Indiana mayoral election
- November 4, 1975

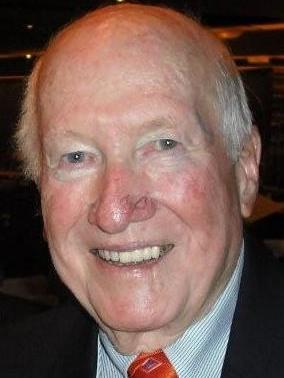
| Nominee | Russell G. Lloyd Sr. | J. Jeff Hays |
| Party | Republican | Democratic |
| Popular vote | 27,350 | 19,890 |
| Percentage | 57.90% | 42.10% |
Mayor before election
Russell G. Lloyd Sr.
Republican
Elected mayor
Russell G. Lloyd Sr.
Republican

The 1975 Evansville, Indiana mayoral election was held on November 4, 1975, and saw the reelection of Republican incumbent Russell G. Lloyd Sr.

=== Primaries ===
Primary elections were held on May 6.

==== Democratic primary ====
The Democratic primary was won the Indiana state representative J. Jeff Hays. The Democratic primary was largely predicted to be a toss-up between Hays and Jerry Linzy, the director of development for the University of Evansville. The third candidate was city sewage department employee Jack Roll.

==== Republican primary ====
The Republican primary was won by incumbent mayor Russell G. Lloyd Sr., who was unopposed in the primary.

=== General election ===
Lloyd became the first Republican mayor to win reelection in Evansville since 1895.

1975 Evansville, Indiana mayoral election
| Party | Candidate | Votes | % |
|---|---|---|---|
| Republican | Russell G. Lloyd Sr. (incumbent) | 27,350 | 57.90 |
| Democratic | J. Jeff Hays | 19,890 | 42.10 |
| Total votes | | 47,240 | 100 |

== 1979 ==
1979 Evansville, Indiana mayoral election
- November 6, 1979
| Nominee | Michael Vandeveer | Randall T. Shepard |
| Party | Democratic | Republican |
| Popular vote | 22,739 | 19,808 |
| Percentage | 53.44% | 46.56% |
Mayor before election
Russell G. Lloyd Sr.
Republican
Elected mayor
Michael Vandeveer
Democratic

The 1979 Evansville, Indiana mayoral election was held on November 6, 1979, and saw the election of Democratic nominee Michael Vandeveer.

Incumbent Republican mayor Russell G. Lloyd Sr., frustrated by tax and spending controls imposed by the state, did not seek reelection to a third term.

=== Primaries ===
Primary elections were held on May 8.

==== Democratic primary ====
City councilman Michael Vandeveer won the Democratic primary. Vandeveer defeated Vanderburgh County assessor James Angermeier. Vandeveer was considered the front-runner in the primary.

==== Republican primary ====
Randall T. Shepard, an administrative assistant to incumbent Republican mayor Russell G. Lloyd Sr., won the Republican primary. Lloyd defeated Bradley Ten Barge, a musician and retail worker. Shephard was the frontrunner for the nomination, and had been endorsed by the local Republican Party organization's slating committee.

=== General election ===
Ahead of election day, race was considered one of the most competitive mayoral races in the state of Indiana that year.

1979 Evansville, Indiana mayoral election
| Party | Candidate | Votes | % |
|---|---|---|---|
| Democratic | Michael D. Vandeveer | 22,739 | 53.44 |
| Republican | Randall T. Shepard | 19,808 | 46.56 |
| Total votes | | 42,547 | 100 |

== 1983 ==
1983 Evansville, Indiana mayoral election
- November 8, 1983
| Nominee | Michael Vandeveer | David A. Koelher |
| Party | Democratic | Republican |
| Popular vote | 28,016 | 12,570 |
| Percentage | 69.03% | 30.9% |
Mayor before election
Michael Vandeveer
Democratic
Elected mayor
Michael Vandeveer
Democratic

The 1983 Evansville, Indiana mayoral election was held on November 8, 1983, and saw the reelection of Democratic incumbent Michael Vandeveer.

=== Primaries ===
Primary elections were held on May 3.

==== Democratic primary ====
Incumbent mayor Michael Vandeveer faced token opposition from two challengers. While neither opponent were seen as posing a strong challenge to Vandeveer, more serious of the two candidates running against Vandeveer in the primary was Berta Hammerseen, a former university professor and former member of the Evansville Housing Authority. Hammerstein criticized Vandeveer for the financial troubles of the city, and for shortcomings in regards to economic development in the city. Mark R. Chellgren of the Associated Press wrote shortly before the day of the primary, "the tone of her attacks has put off some party regulars, who give her little chance to unseat Vandeveer". Vandeveer's other challenger was Larry Williams, who did not do much in regards to campaigning.

==== Republican primary ====
Four-term city councilman and high school teacher David Koehler won the Republican nomination. Running against him in the Republican primary was and former two-term Vanderburgh County sheriff James DeGroote.

Koehler had the backing of the local Republican Party organization, which provided his campaign with organizational and financial support. DeGroote dedicated himself as a full-time campaigner.

Both candidates argued that economic development should be the first priority of Evansville's mayor. The campaign between them was not focused on issues, but rather on personality. Also effecting the race was debate over the influence of the county Republican chairman, Bob Whitehouse.

Koehler worked to soften his public image. Despite being seen as a good manager, Mark R. Chellgren of the Associated Press wrote that he was seen as having, "little regard for the people side of government".

DeGroote ran, in large part, on both his record as sheriff, and on presenting himself with a friendly image.

=== General election ===
Early into the campaign, the Republican Party had hopes that its nominee might be able to unseat Vendeveer. However, Koehler's candidacy failed to create momentum.

Koehler alleged that Vandeveer was guilty of "fiscal mismanagement", often pointing to a financial crisis that the city government had faced in 1981. Koehler also accused Vandeveer of subjecting residents to too many new fees, while also alleging that Vandeveer did not make the best use of the revenues generated by these fees. Koehler also attacked Vandeveer for his shortcomings in attracting economic development.

Vandeveer insisted that the city's economic issues were largely attributable to the ongoing early 1980s recession, and predicted that the city would see improved economic fortunes by the end of the decade.

Both nominees were in agreement that the state of Indiana should pass legislation to establish a new local option income tax, as well as provide additional new methods for city's such as Evansville to generate more revenue.

1983 Evansville, Indiana mayoral election
| Party | Candidate | Votes | % |
|---|---|---|---|
| Democratic | Michael D. Vandeveer (incumbent) | 28,016 | 69.03 |
| Republican | David A. Koelher | 12,570 | 30.97 |
| Total votes | | 40,586 | 100 |

== 1987 ==
1987 Evansville, Indiana mayoral election
- November 3, 1987
| Nominee | Frank F. McDonald II | Al Folz |
| Party | Democratic | Republican |
| Popular vote | 21,974 | 12,567 |
| Percentage | 63.62% | 36.38% |
Mayor before election
Frank F. McDonald II (interim)
Democratic
Elected mayor
Frank F. McDonald II
Democratic

The 1987 Evansville, Indiana mayoral election was held on November 3, 1987, and saw the reelection of Democratic incumbent Frank F. McDonald II, a city councilman who had been serving as interim mayor since May (having been appointed interim mayor on May 23, 1987, by the city council after mayor Michael Vandeveer resigned in order to accept a lobbyist job).

=== Primaries ===
Primary elections were held on May 5.

==== Democratic primary ====
Days before announcing his plans to resign, incumbent Michael Vandeveer was renominated by his party. He had been unopposed for the nomination. After Vanderveer announced his resignation, Frank F. McDonald II was selected by Democratic leaders to fill his place. McDonald was also appointed by the city council to serve as interim mayor until the winner of the election would take office.

==== Republican primary ====
Al Folz won the Republican nomination.

=== General election ===
Folz was seen as running too weak of a campaign organization to stand a strong chance at winning the Democratic-leaning city.

1987 Evansville, Indiana mayoral election
| Party | Candidate | Votes | % |
|---|---|---|---|
| Democratic | Frank F. McDonald II (incumbent) | 21,974 | 63.62 |
| Republican | Al Folz | 12,567 | 36.38 |
| Total votes | | 34,541 | 100 |

== 1991 ==
1991 Evansville, Indiana mayoral election
- November 5, 1991
| Nominee | Frank F. McDonald II | Vaneta G. Becker |
| Party | Democratic | Republican |
| Popular vote | 20,713 | 18,266 |
| Percentage | 53.14% | 46.86% |
Mayor before election
Frank F. McDonald II
Democratic
Elected mayor
Frank F. McDonald II
Democratic

The 1991 Evansville, Indiana mayoral election was held on November 5, 1991, and saw the reelection of Democratic incumbent Frank F. McDonald II.

=== Primaries ===
Primary elections were held on May 8.

==== Democratic primary ====
Incumbent mayor Frank F. McDonald II won renomination unopposed.

==== Republican primary ====
1991 Evansville, Indiana Republican mayoral primary
| Party | Candidate | Votes | % |
|---|---|---|---|
| Republican | Vaneta Becker | 5,584 | 72.16 |
| Republican | Robert Whitehouse | 2,154 | 27.84 |
| Total votes | | 7,738 | 100 |

=== General election ===
1991 Evansville, Indiana mayoral election
| Party | Candidate | Votes | % |
|---|---|---|---|
| Democratic | Frank F. McDonald II (incumbent) | 20,713 | 53.14 |
| Republican | Vaneta G. Becker | 18,266 | 46.86 |
| Total votes | | 38,979 | 100 |

== 1995 ==
1995 Evansville, Indiana mayoral election
- November 7, 1995
| Candidate | Frank F. McDonald II | Lori Frary |
| Party | Democratic | Republican |
| Popular vote | 19,162 | 9,565 |
| Percentage | 66.70 % | 33.30% |
Mayor before election
Frank F. McDonald II
Democratic
Elected mayor
Frank F. McDonald II
Democratic

The 1995 Evansville, Indiana mayoral election was held on November 7, 1995, and saw the reelection of Democratic incumbent Frank McDonald II.

=== Primaries ===
Primary elections were held on May 2.

==== Democratic primary ====
Incumbent Frank McDonald II was renominated, defeating challengers Frank Fuquay and Kerry Longest.

==== Republican primary ====
Business owner Lori Frary won the Republican nomination over David Coker, Jack Groshands, and Doug DeGroot.

=== General election ===
The election was considered a low-key race. Discussion largely centered upon the city's upcoming riverboat casino, which would open the month after the election.

1995 Evansville, Indiana mayoral election
| Party | Candidate | Votes | % |
|---|---|---|---|
| Democratic | Frank McDonald II (incumbent) | 19,162 | 66.70 |
| Republican | Lori Frary | 9,565 | 33.30 |
| Total votes | | 28,727 | 100 |

== 1999 ==
1999 Evansville, Indiana mayoral election
- November 2, 1999
- Turnout: 36%
| Candidate | Russell G. Lloyd Jr. | Rick Borris |
| Party | Republican | Democratic |
| Popular vote | 15,980 | 15,461 |
| Percentage | 50.83% | 49.18% |
Mayor before election
Frank F. McDonald II
Democratic
Elected mayor
Russell G. Lloyd Jr.
Republican

The 1999 Evansville, Indiana mayoral election was held on November 2, 1999, and saw the election of Republican nominee Russell G. Lloyd Jr.

Incumbent Democrat Frank F. McDonald II did not seek reelection.

=== Nominations ===
==== Democratic primary ====
1999 Evansville, Indiana Democratic mayoral primary
| Party | Candidate | Votes | % |
|---|---|---|---|
| Democratic | Richard J. "Rick" Borries | 4,850 | 44.19 |
| Democratic | Gail C. Riecken | 3,964 | 36.12 |
| Democratic | Phil Hoy | 2,015 | 18.36 |
| Democratic | Lawrence Hall | 147 | 1.34 |
| Total votes | | 10,976 | 100 |

==== Republican primary ====
1999 Evansville, Indiana Republican mayoral primary
| Party | Candidate | Votes | % |
|---|---|---|---|
| Republican | Russell G. Lloyd, Jr. | 4,559 | 86.87 |
| Republican | David Woll | 689 | 13.13 |
| Total votes | | 5,248 | 100 |

=== General election ===
1999 Evansville, Indiana mayoral election
| Party | Candidate | Votes | % |
|---|---|---|---|
| Republican | Russell G. Lloyd, Jr. | 15,980 | 50.83 |
| Democratic | Richard J. "Rick" Borries | 15,461 | 49.18 |
| Turnout | | 31,441 | 36 |

== 2003 ==
2003 Evansville, Indiana mayoral election
- November 4, 2003
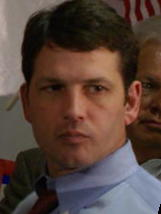

| Candidate | Jonathan Weinzapfel | Russell G. Lloyd Jr. |
| Party | Democratic | Republican |
| Popular vote | 19,089 | 10,063 |
| Percentage | 63.58% | 33.51% |
Mayor before election
Russell G. Lloyd Jr.
Republican
Elected mayor
Jonathan Weinzapfel
Democratic

The 2003 Evansville, Indiana mayoral election was held on November 4, 2003, and saw the election of Democratic nominee Jonathan Weinzapfel, who unseated incumbent Republican mayor Russell G. Lloyd Jr.

=== Nominations ===
==== Democratic primary ====
2003 Evansville, Indiana Democratic mayoral primary
| Party | Candidate | Votes | % |
|---|---|---|---|
| Democratic | Jonathan Weinzapfel | 4,117 | 100 |
| Total votes | | 4,117 | 100 |

==== Republican primary ====
Incumbent Russell G. Lloyd was challenged by Douglas DeGroot, who ran a frugal campaign. DeGroot's performance in the vote was regarded as surprisingly strong.

2003 Evansville, Indiana Republican mayoral primary
| Party | Candidate | Votes | % |
|---|---|---|---|
| Republican | Russell G. Lloyd, Jr. (incumbent) | 1,616 | 66.45 |
| Republican | Douglas DeGroot | 816 | 33.55 |
| Total votes | | 2,432 | 100 |

==== Independent candidates ====
Jack Groshans, Jr. ran as an independent candidate.

=== General election ===
Weinzapfel defeated Lloyd.

2003 was a good year for Democrats in Indiana's mayoral elections, with the party winning control of the mayoralties of all of the state's top seven most populous cities for the first time since 1959. The Democratic Party also won control of the mayoralties in twenty of the state's thirty cities with populations above 25,000. Additionally, in 2003, Democrats won more than 56% of partisan mayoral races in Indiana.

During the general election, Vanderburgh County, where Evansville is located, saw voter turnout of 25% in its various elections.

2003 Evnasville, Indiana mayoral election
| Party | Candidate | Votes | % |
|---|---|---|---|
| Democratic | Jonathan Weinzapfel | 19,089 | 63.58 |
| Republican | Russell G. Lloyd Jr. (incumbent) | 10,063 | 33.51 |
| Independent | Jack Groshans, Jr. | 874 | 2.91 |
| Total votes | | 30,026 | 100 |

== 2007 ==
2007 Evansville, Indiana mayoral election
- November 6, 2007
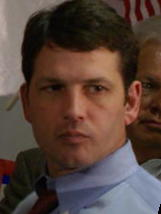

| Candidate | Jonathan Weinzapfel | David J. Nixon |
| Party | Democratic | Republican |
| Popular vote | 13,097 | 2,268 |
| Percentage | 85.24% | 14.76% |
Mayor before election
Jonathan Weinzapfel
Democratic
Elected mayor
Jonathan Weinzapfel
Democratic

The 2007 Evansville, Indiana mayoral election was held on November 6, 2007, and saw the reelection of Democratic incumbent Jonathan Weinzapfel.

=== Nominations ===
Primary elections were held May 8.

During the primary elections, the voter turnout in Vanderburgh County, in which Evansville is located, was 6.12%.

==== Democratic primary ====
2007 Evansville, Indiana Democratic mayoral primary
| Party | Candidate | Votes | % |
|---|---|---|---|
| Democratic | Jonathan Weinzapfel (incumbent) | 3,251 | 100 |
| Total votes | | 3,251 | 100 |

==== Republican primary ====
2007 Evansville, Indiana Republican mayoral primary
| Party | Candidate | Votes | % |
|---|---|---|---|
| Republican | David J. Nixon | 652 | 59.27 |
| Republican | Aaron M. Ridlen | 448 | 40.73 |
| Total votes | | 1,100 | 100 |

=== General election ===
Voter turnout in Vanderburgh County during the November elections was 19.42%.

2007 Evansville, Indiana mayoral election
| Party | Candidate | Votes | % |
|---|---|---|---|
| Democratic | Jonathan Weinzapfel (incumbent) | 13,097 | 85.24 |
| Republican | David J. Nixon | 2,268 | 14.76 |
| Total votes | | 15,365 | 100 |

== 2011 ==
2011 Evansville, Indiana mayoral election
- November 8, 2011
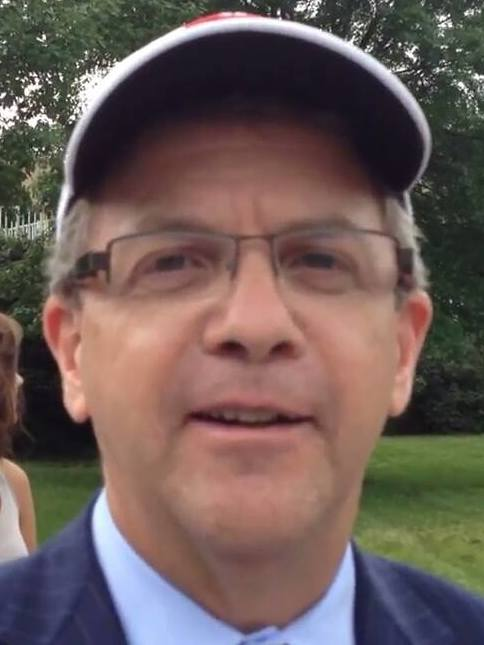

| Candidate | Lloyd Winnecke | Rick A. Davis |
| Party | Republican | Democratic |
| Popular vote | 11,664 | 10,009 |
| Percentage | 53.82% | 46.18% |
Mayor before election
Jonathan Weinzapfel
Democratic
Elected mayor
Lloyd Winnecke
Republican

The 2011 Evansville, Indiana mayoral election was held on November 8, 2011, and saw the election of Rerpublican nominee Lloyd Winnecke.'

Incumbent Democrat Jonathan Weinzapfel did not seek reelection.

=== Nominations ===
Primary elections were held May 3.

During the primary elections, the voter turnout in Vanderburgh County, in which Evansville is located, was 10.06%.

==== Democratic primary ====
2011 Evansville, Indiana Democratic mayoral primary
| Party | Candidate | Votes | % |
|---|---|---|---|
| Democratic | Rick A. Davis | 3,997 | 58.74 |
| Democratic | Troy Tornatta | 2,808 | 41.26 |
| Total votes | | 6,805 | 100 |

==== Republican primary ====
Businessman Lloyd Winnecke defeated Douglas De Groot. De Groot had previously been a candidate in the 2003 Evansville Republican mayoral primary.

2011 Evansville, Indiana Republican mayoral primary
| Party | Candidate | Votes | % |
|---|---|---|---|
| Republican | Lloyd Winnecke | 2,201 | 92.17 |
| Republican | Douglas De Groot | 187 | 7.83 |
| Total votes | | 2,388 | 100 |

=== General election ===
Voter turnout in Evansville for the municipal general election was 23.64%.

2011 Evansville mayoral election
| Party | Candidate | Votes | % |
|---|---|---|---|
| Republican | Lloyd Winnecke | 11,664 | 53.82 |
| Democratic | Rick A. Davis | 10,009 | 46.18 |
| Total votes | | 21,673 | 100 |

== 2015 ==
2015 Evansville, Indiana mayoral election
- November 3, 2015
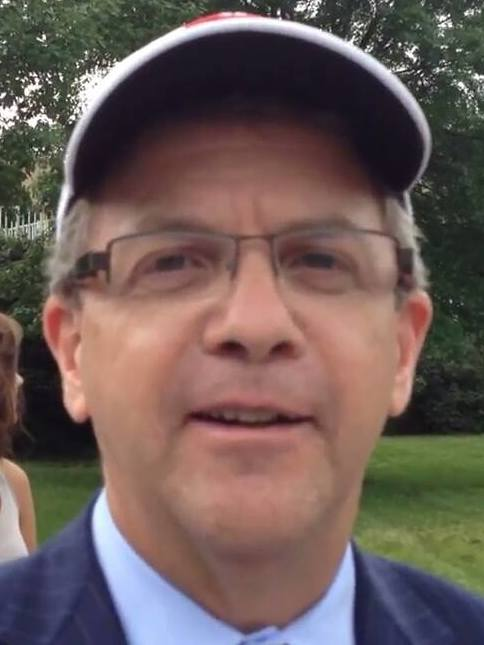

| Candidate | Lloyd Winnecke | Gail Riecken |
| Party | Republican | Democratic |
| Popular vote | 12,309 | 6,723 |
| Percentage | 62.04% | 33.88% |
Mayor before election
Lloyd Winnecke
Republican
Elected mayor
Lloyd Winnecke
Republican

The 2015 Evansville, Indiana mayoral election was held on November 3, 2015, and saw the reelection of Republican Lloyd Winnecke.

=== Nominations ===
Primary elections were held May 5. During the primary elections, turnout in Vanderburgh County, in which Evansville is located, was 6.76%.

==== Democratic primary ====
2015 Evansville, Indiana Democratic mayoral primary
| Party | Candidate | Votes | % |
|---|---|---|---|
| Democratic | Gail Riecken | 3,790 | 100 |
| Total votes | | 3,790 | 100 |

==== Republican primary ====
2015 Evansville, Indiana Republican mayoral primary
| Party | Candidate | Votes | % |
|---|---|---|---|
| Republican | Lloyd Winnecke (incumbent) | 1,723 | 100 |
| Total votes | | 1,723 | 100 |

==== Independent candidates ====
Steve "Woz" Wozniak ran as an independent candidate.

=== General election ===
During the general election, turnout in Vanderburgh County, in which Evansville is located, was 20.70%.

2015 Evansville, Indiana mayoral election
| Party | Candidate | Votes | % |
|---|---|---|---|
| Republican | Lloyd Winnecke (incumbent) | 12,309 | 67.23 |
| Democratic | Gail Riecken | 6,723 | 33.88 |
| Independent | Steve "Woz" Wozniak | 809 | 4.08 |
| Total votes | | 19,841 | 100 |

== 2019 ==
2019 Evansville, Indiana mayoral election
- November 5, 2019
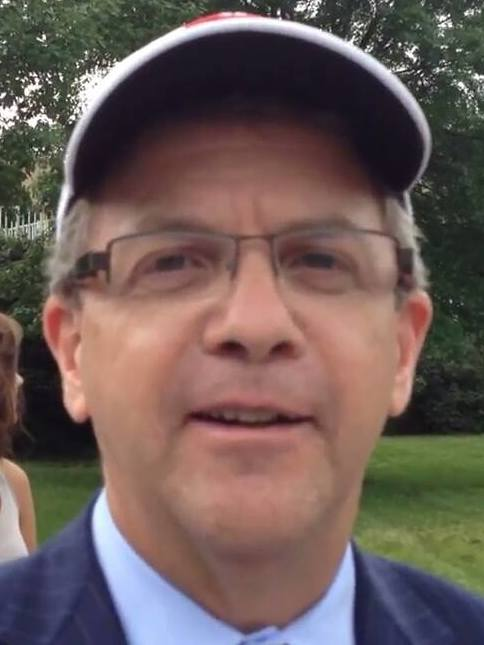

| Candidate | Lloyd Winnecke | Steve Ary |
| Party | Republican | Independent |
| Popular vote | 11,711 | 2,119 |
| Percentage | 80.75% | 14.61% |
Mayor before election
Lloyd Winnecke
Republican
Elected mayor
Lloyd Winnecke
Republican

The 2019 Evansville, Indiana mayoral election was held on November 5, 2019, and saw the reelection of Republican Lloyd Winnecke to a third consecutive term.

=== Nominations ===
Primary elections were held May 7.

==== Democratic primary ====
No candidate ran for the Democratic Party nomination.

For the first time in at least 85 years, the Democratic Party failed to field a candidate in an Evansville mayoral election.

===== Candidates =====
====== Declined to run ======
- Ryan Hatfield, state representative
- Ben Shoulders, Vanderburgh County Commissioner
- Jonathan Weaver, City Councilman

==== Libertarian nomination ====
Bart Gadau was nominated by the Libertarian Party.

==== Republican primary ====
2019 Evansville, Indiana Republican mayoral primary
| Party | Candidate | Votes | % |
|---|---|---|---|
| Republican | Lloyd Winnecke (incumbent) | 1,938 | 88.05 |
| Republican | Connie L. Whitman | 263 | 11.95 |
| Total votes | | 2,201 | 100 |

==== Independent candidates ====
Steve Ary ran as an independent candidate.

=== General election ===
During the general election, turnout in Vanderburgh County, in which Evansville is located, was 19.94%.

Winnecke became the fourth mayor of Evansville to be elected to a third term.

2019 Evansville, Indiana mayoral election
| Party | Candidate | Votes | % |
|---|---|---|---|
| Republican | Lloyd Winnecke (incumbent) | 11,711 | 80.75 |
| Independent | Steve Ary | 2,119 | 14.61 |
| Libertarian | Bart Gadau | 672 | 4.63 |
| Total votes | | 14,502 | 100 |

== 2023 ==
2023 Evansville, Indiana mayoral election
- November 7, 2023
| Candidate | Stephanie Terry | Natalie Rascher | Michael Daugherty |
| Party | Democratic | Republican | Libertarian |
| Popular vote | 8,679 | 7,131 | 2,032 |
| Percentage | 48.64 | 39.96 | 11.4 |
Mayor before election
Lloyd Winnecke
Republican
Elected mayor
Stephanie Terry
Democratic

The 2023 Evansville, Indiana mayoral election was held on November 7, 2023. Party nominees were selected in primary elections on May 2. Incumbent Republican mayor Lloyd Winnecke chose to retire rather than run for re-election to a fourth term in office and was succeeded by Stephanie Terry.

=== Republican primary ===
==== Declared ====
- Cheryl Musgrave, Vanderburgh County commissioner and former Vanderburgh County Assessor
- Natalie Rascher, talent acquisition professional and member of the Vanderburgh County Alcohol Beverage Commission

==== Disqualified ====
- Caine Helmer, store greeter

==== Withdrew ====
- Gabe Whitley, lobbyist

==== Declined ====
- Justin Elpers, city councilor
- Steve Schaefer, deputy mayor
- Lloyd Winnecke, incumbent mayor (endorsed Rascher)

==== Endorsements ====
Cheryl Musgrave

Local officials

- Diana Moers, Vanderburgh County Prosecutor

Organizations

- Evansville Fraternal Order of Police
Natalie Rascher

Local officials

- Lloyd Winnecke, incumbent mayor of Evansville

==== Results ====
Republican primary results
| Party | Candidate | Votes | % |
|---|---|---|---|
| Republican | Natalie Rascher | 3,604 | 63.7% |
| Republican | Cheryl Musgrave | 2,045 | 36.2% |
| Total votes | | 5,649 | 100% |

=== Democratic primary ===
==== Declared ====
- Stephanie Terry, Vanderburgh County councilor and executive director of the Children's Museum of Evansville

==== Disqualified ====
- Brian Alexander, advertising planner

==== Declined ====
- Alex Burton, city councilor
- Ryan Hatfield, Indiana state representative
- Missy Mosby, city councilor
- Phil Smith, Evansville assistant police chief
- Jonathan Weaver, at-large city councilor

==== Endorsements ====
Stephanie Terry

Local officials

- Jonathan Weinzapfel, former mayor of Evansville

=== Libertarian nominee ===
- Michael Daugherty, retired businessman

=== Results ===
2023 Evansville, Indiana mayoral election
| Party | Candidate | Votes | % |
|---|---|---|---|
| Democratic | Stephanie Terry | 8,679 | 48.64 |
| Republican | Natalie Rascher | 7,131 | 39.96 |
| Libertarian | Michael Daugherty | 2,032 | 11.4 |
| Total votes | | 17,842 | 100 |
