= List of mayors of Evansville, Indiana =

The following is a list of mayors of Evansville, Indiana:

#	Image	Mayor	Term start	Term end	Party
1		James G. Jones	1847	1853	
2		John S. Hopkins	1853	1856	
3		John Hewson	1856	1859	
4		William H. Baker	1859	1868	
5		William Hall Walker	1868	1871	
6		Eccles G. Van Riper	1871	1871	
(4)		William H. Baker (2nd term)	1871	1873	
7		Charles H. Butterfield	1873	1874	
8		John Jay Kleiner	1874	1880	Democratic
9		Thomas C. Bridwell	1880	1886	
10		John H. Dannettell	1886	1889	
11		Nicholas Miner Goodlett	1889	1892	
12		Anthony C. "AC" Hawkins	1892	1897	
13		William M. Akin Jr.	1897	1901	Democratic
14		Charles G. Covert	1901	1906	Republican
15		John William Boehne Sr.	1906	1909	Democratic
16		John J. Nolan	1909	1910	Democratic
17		Charles F. Heilman	1910	1914	Republican
18		Benjamin Bosse	1914	1922	Democratic
19		William H. Elmendorf	1922	1926	Democratic
20		Herbert Males	1926	1930	Republican
21		Frank W. Griese	1930	1935	Democratic
22		William H. Dress	1935	1943	Democratic
23		Manson Reichert	1943	1948	Republican
(22)		William H. Dress (2nd term)	1948	1949	Democratic
23		Edwin F. Diekmann	1949	1952	Democratic
24		Henry O. Roberts	1952	1955	Republican
25		Vance Hartke	1955	1958	Democratic
26		J. William Davidson	1958	1960	Democratic
27		Frank F. McDonald	1960	1972	Democratic
28		Russell G. Lloyd Sr.	1972	1980	Republican
29		Michael D. Vandeveer	1980	1987	Democratic
30		Frank F. McDonald II	1987	2000	Democratic
31		Russell G. Lloyd Jr.	2000	2004	Republican
32		Jonathan Weinzapfel	2004	2012	Democratic
33		Lloyd Winnecke	2012	2024	Republican
34		Stephanie Terry	2024	-	Democratic
