= Bob Kercher =

American football player (1919–2004)

No. 18
- Position: End

Personal information
- Born: January 14, 1919; German Township, Indiana, U.S.
- Died: January 4, 2004 (aged 84); Russell, Kansas, U.S.
- Listed height: 6 ft 2 in (1.88 m)
- Listed weight: 196 lb (89 kg)

Career information
- High school: Reitz Memorial (Evansville, Indiana); Scarborough Day School (Briarcliff Manor, New York)
- College: Georgetown (1937–1939)
- NFL draft: 1940: undrafted

Career history
- Paterson Panthers (1940); Philadelphia Eagles (1941–1943)*; → Wilmington Clippers (1941–1942); New York Giants (1944)*; Green Bay Packers (1944)
- * Offseason or practice squad member only

Awards and highlights
- NFL champion (1944)

Career NFL statistics
- Games played: 2
- Stats at Pro Football Reference

Robert Frederick Kercher (January 14, 1919 – January 4, 2004) was an American professional football player. He played college football for the Georgetown Hoyas and later for four seasons professionally as an end. He played in the American Association (AA) for the Paterson Panthers and Wilmington Clippers and in the National Football League (NFL) for the Green Bay Packers. He was also a member of the Philadelphia Eagles and New York Giants.

== Early life ==
Robert Frederick Kercher was born on January 14, 1919, in German Township, Indiana, to Catherine (née Beckerle) and John F. Kercher. He had seven sisters and two brothers; his cousin, Dick Kercher, also played professional football. He attended Reitz Memorial Catholic High School in Evansville, Indiana, where he competed in football, baseball, and track and field. An end in football, he started on championship teams in 1934 and 1935 and was named both all-city and all-state in those years. He was on the 1933, 1934, and 1935 Memorial teams that compiled undefeated records. As a senior in 1935, he was named the city's most outstanding player, and the Evansville Press described him as "probably the best end turned out in a score of years in southern Indiana football".

Kercher graduated from Memorial in 1936. He then played a season at Scarborough Day School in Briarcliff Manor, New York. He played with fellow Memorial alumnus Len Will at Scarborough, and the two scored 81 of the team's 134 points in the 1936 season. Kercher helped Scarborough to an undefeated record that year and also played basketball there.

== College career ==
Kercher enrolled at Georgetown University in Washington, D.C., in 1937. That year, he played for the freshman football team and helped them to an undefeated season. He then made the varsity team in 1938 and Georgetown compiled a perfect record of 8–0. The Washington Evening Star described him as playing a "steady, aggressive game", and he caught both touchdowns in the team's 14–7 win over the Maryland Terrapins in the final game of the season. He played his last season for Georgetown in 1939, and once again his team went undefeated, although Georgetown recorded one tie in the season. Kercher was selected both All-D.C. and All-Eastern in his two seasons with the Georgetown varsity, and he also played two seasons of varsity baseball and basketball. He did not return for his senior year due to academic issues.

== Professional career ==
In 1940, Kercher signed with the Paterson Panthers of the American Association (AA), turning down an offer from the Washington Redskins of the National Football League (NFL). In addition to end, he was also used at times as a placekicker for the Panthers, scoring a game-winning extra point in a 20–19 win against the Providence Steamrollers. He ended up appearing in nine games for the Panthers, recording four extra points made and one field goal while the team compiled a record of 6–4. He signed with the Philadelphia Eagles of the NFL in July 1941. After not making the team, he was optioned to the Wilmington Clippers of the AA in September 1941. He appeared in 13 of the 14 games played by the Clippers (including exhibitions) and scored one touchdown. He played in eight of the team's nine AA games, seven as a starter, and helped the Clippers to a record of 4–3–1 and the league championship title.

Kercher re-signed with the Eagles in 1942 but was released and returned to the Clippers, now an independent team. He appeared in eight games, one as a starter, and helped the team compile an undefeated record of 8–0–1. He was released by the Eagles in August 1943. Kercher later joined the New York Giants in April 1944. In August, he was acquired by the Green Bay Packers. He appeared in two games for the Packers as a backup and was a member of their 1944 NFL championship team. He did not return to the team in 1945, ending his professional career.

== Later life and death ==
During professional football career, Kercher married Marjorie Schaich on January 6, 1942, in Evansville, Indiana. They made their home in Wilmington, Delaware. He worked in the oilfield supply business in Colorado, Wyoming, and Oklahoma before finally moving to Russell, Kansas, where he worked for Bovaird Oil Field Supply and was also a manager for LoMar Bowling Supply Store. Kercher was also an ardent golfer and worked as a golf pro for the Russell Municipal Golf Course.

Marjorie Kercher preceded her husband Bob in death on November 23, 2001, after nearly 60 years of marriage. He died on January 4, 2004, at the age of 84.
