= University Parkway =

University Parkway may refer to:

== Roads ==
- County Road 610 (Florida), known as University Parkway in Manatee and Sarasota counties
- Georgia State Route 316, known as University Parkway
- University Parkway (Evansville), Indiana
- University Parkway (Baltimore), Maryland
- University Parkway (Winston-Salem), Massachusetts
- Utah State Route 265, known as University Parkway

== Other ==
- University District, San Bernardino, often referred to as University Parkway
