= J. Jeff Hays =

American politician

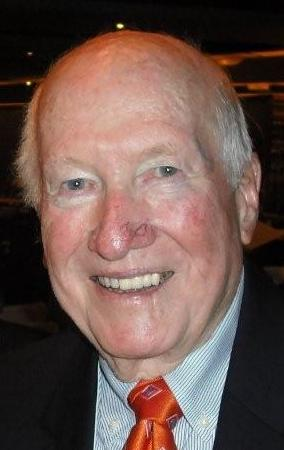
- J. Jeff Hays

Member of the Indiana House of Representatives from the 77th district
- In office November 3, 1982 – November 6, 1996
- Preceded by: Constituency established
- Succeeded by: Brian Hasler

Member of the Indiana House of Representatives from the 71st district
- In office November 6, 1974 – November 3, 1982
- Preceded by: James Richard Harris
- Succeeded by: Richard Bernard Wathen

Member of the Indiana House of Representatives from the 39th district
- In office November 4, 1970 – November 8, 1972
- Preceded by: John Coates Cox
- Succeeded by: William Edward Lapar

Personal details
- Born: December 27, 1929 Archer City, Texas, U.S.
- Died: December 23, 2008 (aged 78)
- Party: Democratic
- Spouse: Mary Lou Hays
- Children: 5
- Education: University of Evansville

Military service
- Allegiance: United States
- Branch/service: United States Army
- Years of service: 1951–1953
- Rank: Sergeant
- Battles/wars: Korean War

John Jefferson "Jeff" Hays (December 27, 1929 – December 23, 2008) was an American politician. Hays was a progressive democrat and long-time member of the Indiana House of Representatives serving from 1970 until his retirement in 1996.

== Early life and education ==
Jeff Hays was born the youngest of four in Archer City, Texas to Joseph Colin and Vera Pruitt Hays. The family moved to Evansville, Indiana during World War II. Hays graduated from Evansville Reitz Memorial High School, class of 1947, a standout player on the school's basketball, football, and baseball teams. In the fall of that year, he entered Evansville College (now University of Evansville) on a football scholarship as a quarterback, later receiving his undergraduate degree with a major in Marketing and a minor in Journalism. Upon canceling college deferments, he was drafted into the U.S. Army in August, 1951. After completing military service, he re-entered the University of Evansville at night completing degree work and graduating in 1955.

== Military service ==
Hays was a veteran of the Korean War, where he was awarded the bronze star for valor. After serving on the front lines, Hays was assigned to the Division Headquarters in the office of Public Information as an Army correspondent, gathering news stories from soldiers for publication in the Division Newspaper, Stars and Stripes, American Newspapers and in the Soldier's Home Town Newspaper. Later he went to Tokyo, Japan to edit the Division Newspaper at an Australian newspaper print shop.

== Indiana State Representative ==
Hays served in the House of Representatives of the Indiana General Assembly from 1970 to 1996, representing Evansville's Central City and Southeastern Vanderburgh County. He was a member of the powerful tax writing Ways and Means Committee, and his involvement shaped state tax and fiscal legislation. He also was Chairman of the House Commerce Committee and became an expert on utility issues.

During Hays' tenure and in large part through his support, Indiana State University at Evansville gained independence from Indiana State University and is now the University of Southern Indiana. Hays was also a major opponent of tax abatements for corporations, stating that they shift the tax burden from corporations to citizens. Hays believed that communities are often forced to offer such abatements to lure corporate investment or to appease corporations when they threaten plant closures or layoffs. His contention was that these tax breaks usually netted little long-term return for the communities that offered them.

Hays supported senator Edward Kennedy for president in 1980 and introduced him at a major speech in Evansville. Hays was a delegate at the 1992 Democratic National Convention in New York City, where future president Bill Clinton was nominated for president. He was a Democratic nominee for mayor of Evansville in 1975, losing to Russell G. Lloyd, Sr. Upon his retirement, Hays commented, "Most of the issues I've seen before. It's time to turn it over to new people. I'm glad I was able to recognize that."

== Non-political career ==
Hays spent ten years as Editor of The Message Newspaper of the Catholic Diocese of Evansville. He also served as Director of Purchasing at the University of Southern Indiana from 1977 to 1992. In 1999, he began work as a lobbyist for five years in the Indiana State Legislature with the Hays Murray Group. An avid writer, he contributed frequently to the local paper, the Evansville Courier & Press, and to The Evansville Boneyard, an online political commentary website. In 2007, Hays wrote a book, My 10 Years in the Boneyard, a compilation of his articles published on the website.

== Death and legacy ==
Hays was preceded in death by his wife, Mary Lou Hays, two sisters, and one brother. Surviving him are his five children: Lisa Hays Murray, Laurie Hays Becher, Lynn (Hays) Cosier, Christine (Hays) Henson, and John Jefferson Hays, II along with 12 grandchildren and 3 great-grandchildren. With his five children present, the former legislator was memorialized in a joint resolution of the Indiana General Assembly on March 3, 2009. The resolution recognizes his contributions to the State House of Representatives and to the State of Indiana.

He is remembered as a political liberal and champion of civil and human rights. Once asked if he wanted to be remembered as a statesman, Hays declined, saying, "I would like to be remembered as a politician. A statesman is thought of as being above the people, while a politician is of the people".
