= Riecken =

Riecken is a German language surname. It stems from the male given name Richard – and may refer to:

- Gail Riecken (1945), former Democratic member of the Indiana House of Representatives
- Henry Riecken (1917–2012), American psychologist
