= Russell G. Lloyd Jr. =

American politician

Russell G. Lloyd Jr. (born c. 1956) is an American Republican politician in Evansville, Indiana.

== Career ==
Lloyd is the former city controller of Evansville, Indiana. He served as mayor from 2000 until 2003, and is also a former city council member. He worked as a certified public accountant.

== Personal life ==
Lloyd is one of six children of Genevieve A. and Russell G. Lloyd Sr., who served as mayor from 1971 until 1979. His father was shot and killed in 1980; his mother died in 2011 after an extended illness. In 2012, his sister Mary M. Lloyd was the Superior Court chief judge for Vanderburgh County.

== Electoral history ==
1999 mayoral

1999 Evansville, Indiana Republican mayoral primary
Party	Candidate	Votes	%
Republican	Russell G. Lloyd, Jr.	4,559	86.87
Republican	David Woll	689	13.13
Total votes		5,248	100

1999 Evansville mayoral election
Party	Candidate	Votes	%
Republican	Russell G. Lloyd, Jr.	15,980	50.83
Democratic	Richard J. "Rick" Borries	15,461	49.18
Total votes		31,441	100

2003 mayoral

2003 Evansville, Indiana Republican mayoral primary
Party	Candidate	Votes	%
Republican	Russell G. Lloyd, Jr. (incumbent)	1,616	66.45
Republican	Douglas DeGroot	816	33.55
Total votes		2,432	100

2003 Evansville, Indiana mayoral election
Party	Candidate	Votes	%
Democratic	Jonathan Weinzapfel	19,089	63.58
Republican	Russell G. Lloyd Jr. (incumbent)	10,063	33.51
Independent	Jack Groshans, Jr.	874	2.91
Total votes		30,026	100

Party political offices
Preceded by Frank F. McDonald II	32nd Mayor of Evansville, Indiana; January 1, 2000 – December 31, 2003	Succeeded by Jonathan Weinzapfel
