= Lloyd Winnecke =

American politician

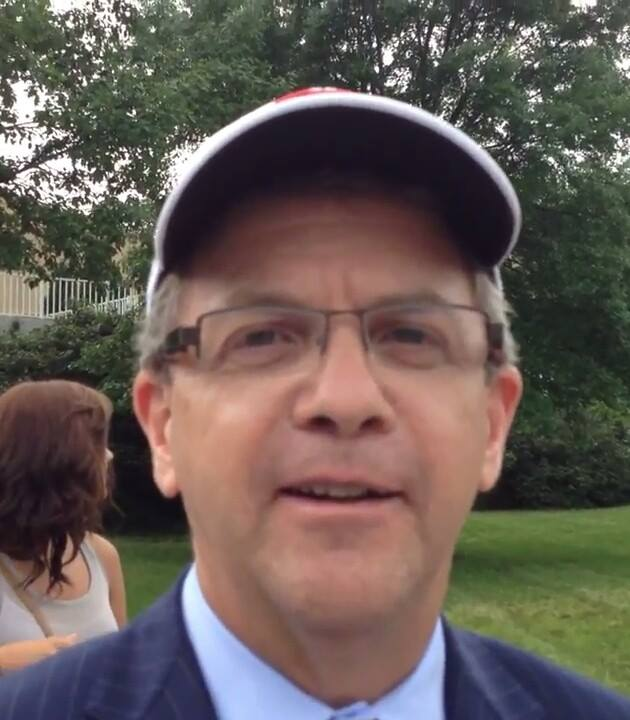

34th Mayor of Evansville
- In office January 1, 2012 – December 31, 2023
- Preceded by: Jonathan Weinzapfel
- Succeeded by: Stephanie Terry

Personal details
- Born: June 6, 1960 (age 66) Evansville, Indiana, U.S.
- Party: Republican
- Spouse: Carolyn McClintock
- Children: 1
- Education: University of Evansville (BA)

Lloyd Winnecke (born June 6, 1960) is an American politician and businessman who was the 34th mayor of Evansville, Indiana. He was elected in November 2011 and his four-year term began January 1, 2012. In November 2015, Winnecke was re-elected for a second term, and, in November 2019, he was elected to a third term. He chose to retire rather than run for re-election to a fourth term in office and was succeeded by Stephanie Terry in 2023.

Winnecke formerly served as news director for WEHT-TV News 25 in Henderson, Kentucky. He also served as president of the Vanderburgh County Commission and was senior vice president and marketing director for Fifth Third Bank.

== Early life and education ==
Lloyd Winnecke was born in Evansville to Ralph and Shirley Winnecke, who were lab technicians at Mead Johnson. Winnecke graduated from Central High School in 1978 and attended the University of Evansville, where he received a Bachelor's degree in communications.

== Career ==
=== Fifth Third Bank and news broadcasting ===
Winnecke worked as senior vice president and marketing director for Fifth Third Bank and was also News Director at WEHT News 25.

=== Mayor of Evansville ===
Winnecke's first term as Evansville mayor began on January 1, 2012. He is the third Republican to head the City of Evansville since 1955. In his first year in office he fought for, and secured, a state-funded full cloverleaf at one of the city's busiest intersections at the Lloyd Expressway and U.S. Route 41.

Winnecke sought to improve city hall's responsiveness through the use of a smartphone app that gives Evansville residents a way to report non-emergency issues to city government.

In an effort to boost downtown development and conventions Winnecke spearheaded a number of related projects. He successfully championed a downtown location for a new interdisciplinary academic health science education and research campus affiliated with the Indiana University School of Medicine - Evansville. In 2013 he also proposed a new 253 room convention hotel adjacent to the Ford Center and Old National Events Plaza. The project included a $7 million subsidy for the hotel and an additional $13 million in public funds for a new parking garage, bridges connecting the hotel, Old National Events Plaza and the Ford Center, and improvements to the Events Plaza. However, in December 2014 Old National withdrew from the project and it was delayed until a revised plan with 240 rooms was approved in 2015.

Winnecke opposed the state's proposed constitutional ban on same-sex marriage and expressed concern over Indiana Senate Bill 101, also known as the Indiana "religious objections" bill, as sending the "wrong message" about the state. On January 9, 2019, Winnecke filed for re-election to seek a third term as mayor.

== Personal life ==
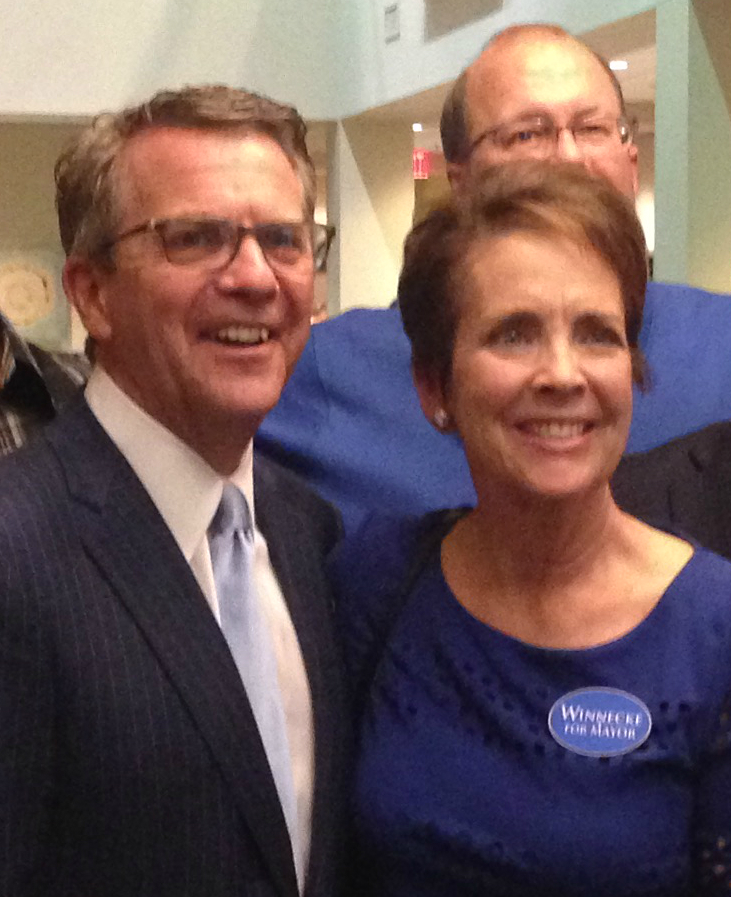
Mayor Winnecke and wife Carol in 2016

Winnecke resides in downtown Evansville, Indiana. He is married to Carolyn McClintock and has a daughter, Danielle. Winnecke is a Catholic and attends St. Mary's Catholic Church.

== Electoral history ==
=== 2011 ===
Evansville mayoral election, 2011: Primary
Party	Candidate	Votes	%
Republican	Lloyd Winnecke	2,201	92.17
Republican	Douglas Degroot	187	7.83
Total votes		2,388	100
Turnout			7

Evansville mayoral election, 2011: General
Party	Candidate	Votes	%
Republican	Lloyd Winnecke	11,664	53.82
Democratic	Rick Davis	10,009	46.18
Total votes		21,673	100.00
Turnout			15
Republican gain from Democratic			

=== 2015 ===
Evansville mayoral election, 2015: Primary
Party	Candidate	Votes	%
Republican	Lloyd Winnecke (incumbent)	1,723	100.00
Total votes		1,723	100.00
Turnout			5

Evansville mayoral election, 2015: General
Party	Candidate	Votes	%
Republican	Lloyd Winnecke (incumbent)	12,309	64.68
Democratic	Gail Riecken	6,723	35.32
Total votes		19,032	100.00
Turnout			13
Republican hold			

=== 2019 ===
Evansville mayoral election, 2019: Primary
Party	Candidate	Votes	%
Republican	Lloyd Winnecke (incumbent)	1,938	88.05
Republican	Connie Whitman	263	11.95
Total votes		2,201	100
Turnout			6

Evansville mayoral election, 2019: General
Party	Candidate	Votes	%
Republican	Lloyd Winnecke (incumbent)	11,711	80.75
Independent	Steve Ary	2,119	14.61
Libertarian	Bart Gadau	672	4.63
Total votes		14,502	100.00
Turnout			15
Republican hold			
