= Reitz Memorial High School =

Catholic high school in Indiana, US

- Memorial
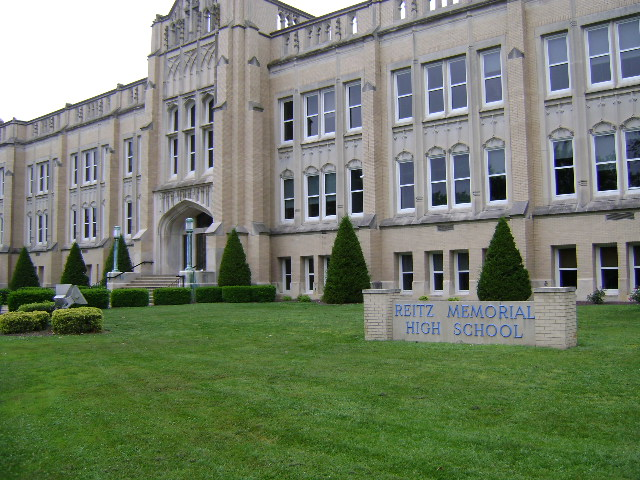

Location
- 1500 East Lincoln Avenue; Evansville, Indiana 47714; United States; 37°58′14″N 87°32′12″W

Information
- Type: Private, Coeducational
- Religious affiliation: Roman Catholic
- Patron saint: St. Joseph
- Established: 1925
- Founder: Francis Joseph Reitz
- Oversight: Diocese of Evansville
- President: Josh Reising
- Principal: Aaron Schmitt
- Chaplain: Zach Etienne
- Grades: 9 – 12
- Enrollment: 603 (2023-24)
- Colors: Royal Blue; White
- Athletics conference: Southern Indiana Athletic Conference
- Nickname: Tigers
- Accreditation: North Central Association of Colleges and Schools
- Newspaper: The View
- Yearbook: The Review
- Tuition: $4,200–$6,600
- Website: www.reitzmemorial.org

Reitz Memorial High School or simply Memorial High School (MHS) is an inter-parochial Catholic high school on the east side of Evansville, Indiana, United States. It sits on land bought with money donated by Francis Joseph Reitz in 1922 in memory of his parents, John Augustus and Gertrude Reitz. The school officially opened its doors on January 5, 1925. It is part of the Diocese of Evansville.

== History ==
In 1922 Francis Joseph Reitz pledged one million dollars for the school to be built, for which he was presented with the insignia of Knight and Knight Commander of the Order of Pope Pius IX. The original, main building was built three stories high of Ohio gray brick and elaborate trimmings of Indiana limestone with a Tudor Gothic design. By New Year's Day, 1925, the school had 18 classrooms, an auditorium that was used as a gymnasium, a cafeteria, library, candy store, parlor and a large recreation room, it was dedicated by Bishop Joseph Chartrand of Indianapolis. Classes began on January 5, 1925, with the Brothers of Holy Cross from the University of Notre Dame teaching the boys and the Sisters of Providence of Saint Mary-of-the-Woods teaching the girls, each on separate floors.

In 1969, a new addition was completed. The new wing extending along Bennighof Avenue came with expanded first and second floors, a new gym, band room, and library. The new gym could hold up to 2,000 people. In 1998, a new addition, costing roughly $5 million was added to the western part of the building. The new wing, also known as "the west wing", added eight more classrooms, two art studios, two science labs, a wrestling room, a second, smaller auxiliary gymnasium, and a new media center. The final renovations increased the student capacity to 900 students.

The Brothers of Holy Cross departed the school gradually beginning in the late 20th century, with the last teacher retiring in 2009. However, upon the school's centennial in 2026, the administrators announced that the school would once again be sponsored by the order's Midwestern Province.

== Athletics ==
To distinguish between two schools named for members of the same family, the IHSAA uses the name Evansville Memorial instead of Evansville Reitz Memorial, and refers to the older EVSC run FJ Reitz High School as Evansville Reitz. Both schools compete in the Southern Indiana Athletic Conference. Their school colors are white and blue. The following IHSAA sanctioned sports are offered:

- Baseball (boys')
  - State champions - 1978, 1989, 1993
- Basketball (boys' and girls')
  - Girls' state champions - 2011
- Cross country (boys' and girls')
- Football (boys')
  - State champions - 2017, 2019
- Golf (boys' and girls')
- Soccer (boys & girls)
  - Boys' state champions - 2007, 2008, 2016, 2017, 2019, 2020, 2024
  - Girls' state champions - 1996, 2008, 2012, 2017, 2021, 2022
- Softball (girls)
  - State champions - 2002
- Swimming (boys' and girls')
- Tennis (boys' and girls')
  - Girls' state champions - 1991, 1993, 1994, 1995, 1996, 2012
- Track (boys' and girls')
- Volleyball (girls')
- Wrestling (boys')

RMHS also competes in the National Archery in the Schools Program, placing 4th, 2nd, 2nd, and 2nd in the 2016-2019 Indiana NASP State Tournaments, as well as placing 1st in the 2018 Centershot Ministries World Tournament.

== Notable alumni ==
=== Athletics ===
- Scott Cannon: Former professional soccer player in Major League Soccer, American Professional Soccer League, National Professional Soccer League, and USL; current Director of Coaching for Black Watch Premier (Rhode Island).
- Branson Combs: NFL linebacker for the Jacksonville Jaguars
- Bob Hargrave: Quarterback of the 1937 Mythical National Championship football team (for Memorial), Honorable mention All-American Quarterback for the University of Notre Dame.
- Billy Hillenbrand: Former All-American halfback for the NCAA Indiana Hoosiers; AAFC football player (1946–48) for the Chicago Rockets and Baltimore Colts (1946 – 1948).
- Dick Kercher, halfback and defensive back for the Detroit Lions (1954).
- Kyle Kuric: Former NCAA basketball player at the University of Louisville (2008 – 2012); professional in the Spanish League.
- Max Lachowecki: Professional soccer player for the Tampa Bay Rowdies of the USL Championship.
- Don Mattingly: Current Interim Manager Philadelphia Phillies; Former MLB New York Yankees first baseman (1982 – 1995) and coach (2004 – 2007); former MLB Los Angeles Dodgers coach (2008 – 2010) and former MLB Miami Marlins manager (2011 – 2022).
- Jeff Schulz: Former MLB outfielder for The Kansas City Royals (1989–90) and Pittsburgh Pirates (1991).
- Larry Stallings: Former NFL St Louis Cardinals linebacker (1963 – 1976); Pro Bowl 1970.

=== Business ===
- William C. Stone: Founder, Chairman and CEO of SS&C Technologies.

=== Entertainment ===
- Philip Lawrence: Songwriter, record producer, entrepreneur, and voice actor best known for his work with the songwriting and production team The Smeezingtons, alongside Bruno Mars.
- Jama Williamson: theater and television actress, she appeared as Wendy Haverford on NBC's Parks and Recreation.

=== Politics ===
- Jeff Hays: member of the Indiana House of Representatives from 1970 to 1996.
- Jonathan Weinzapfel: 33rd mayor of Evansville, Indiana (2004 – 2012); Chancellor of Ivy Tech.

== See also ==
- List of high schools in Indiana
