= Michael Vandeveer =

American politician

Michael D. Vandeveer was the mayor of Evansville, Indiana from 1980 until he resigned in 1987 to take a job in the private sector.

== See also ==
- 1979 Evansville, Indiana mayoral election
- 1983 Evansville, Indiana mayoral election

Preceded by Russell G. Lloyd Sr.	Mayor of Evansville, Indiana; 1980–1987	Succeeded by Frank F. McDonald II
