= Ryan Hatfield =

American politician

Member of the Indiana House of Representatives from the 77th district
- In office November 9, 2016 – November 18, 2024
- Preceded by: Gail Riecken
- Succeeded by: Alex Burton

Personal details
- Born: Ryan David Hatfield; June 8, 1986 (age 40) Evansville, Indiana
- Party: Democratic
- Spouse: Kendra Hatfield
- Education: Purdue University (BA); Southern Illinois University (JD)

Ryan David Hatfield (born June 8, 1986) is an American attorney and politician who has served as a Vanderburgh County Circuit Court judge since 2025. He previously served as the State Representative for Indiana House District 77.

Outside of state politics, Hatfield worked in private practice working at Hatfield Law Office, LLC in Evansville, Indiana. He also worked as an adjunct faculty member at Ivy Tech Community College and as an instructor at the Southwest Indiana Law Enforcement Academy.

== Early life and education ==
Born to Julie Whitehead Hatfield and David Hatfield, Ryan Hatfield was raised in Evansville, Indiana.

Hatfield graduated with Honors from William Henry Harrison High School and earned a Bachelor of Arts from Purdue University. He also studied at Tsinghua University in Beijing, China, and earned a Certificate in Entrepreneurship and Innovation from Purdue’s Krannert School of Management.

Hatfield earned his Juris Doctor from Southern Illinois University School of Law.

While a student, Hatfield became active in both legal and political work interning for the United States District Court for the Southern District of Indiana, U.S. Congressman Joe Donnelly of Indiana, and U.S. Congressman and House Minority Whip Steny Hoyer of Maryland.

== Vanderburgh County Deputy Prosecutor ==
Hatfield served as the Vanderburgh County Deputy Prosecutor from 2013 to 2016.

As a Deputy Prosecutor, Hatfield prosecuted crimes of violence, including homicide, sexual assault, and drug trafficking. He also worked as the Deputy Prosecutor of the Vanderburgh Co. Drug Treatment Court, Veterans Treatment Court, and Juvenile Drug Treatment Court with the goal of successful rehabilitation, recovery, and sober living.

During his tenure, Hatfield prosecuted hundreds of felony cases and was awarded for his work obtaining successful jury verdicts on behalf of victims and their families.

He was also the first prosecutor in Indiana to successfully secure a jury conviction in a case alleging Munchausen Syndrome by proxy.

== Indiana House of Representatives ==
In 2016, Hatfield defeated Republican Johnny Kincaid after receiving 59% of the votes. He replaced Democrat Gail Riecken who did not seek re-election.

Hatfield has championed the causes promised in his campaign announcement as he focuses on protecting the most vulnerable Hoosiers, revitalizing public education, and fighting for fairness and prosperity for working families.

While at the Statehouse, Hatfield has authored and co-authored legislation enacted into law improving the areas of justice, law, judiciary, criminal code, victim rights, health care, utilities, telecommunications, environment, etc.

Hatfield serves in leadership in the Indiana House of Representatives as Assistant Democratic Whip. He currently sits on four standing House committees, and serves as the Ranking Democratic Member on two of them: Ranking Democrat of the Indiana House Judiciary Committee; Ranking Democrat of the Indiana House Employment, Labor and Pensions Committee; Standing Member of the Indiana House Public Health Committee and Standing Member of the Indiana House Utilities, Energy and Telecommunications Committee.

During his legislative tenure, Hatfield has also served as Ranking Democrat of the Committee on Elections and Apportionment and as a Standing Member of the Committee on Courts and Criminal Code.

== Vanderburgh County Circuit Court ==
Hatfield won election to the Vanderburgh County Circuit Court in 2024. He was sworn in on January 2, 2025.

== Professional recognitions ==
- Humane Society of the United States Humane Legislator of the Year Award (2020)
- American Academy of Attorneys Top 40 Under 40 (2019)
- Indiana Farm Bureau Emerging Leader Award (2018)
- Indiana Trial Lawyers Association Legislator of the Year (2018)
- Lawyers of Distinction - Civil Litigation Excellence (2018) (2019)
- National Trial Lawyers Top 40 Under 40 – Civil Plaintiff Lawyer (2017)
- Top 10% of Lawyers in the United States by Lawyers of Distinction (2017)
- Rue's Ratings' Best Attorneys of America (2016)
- Admitted to the Bar in the State of Indiana (2013); U.S. District Court, Southern District of Indiana (2013); U.S. District Court, Northern District of Indiana (2013)

== Elections ==
=== 2016 ===
In December 2015, Ryan Hatfield announced he would seek the Indiana State Representative seat being vacated by Democrat Gail Riecken setting up a contentionus three person primary. On May 3, 2016, Ryan Hatfield defeated Lori Sherman and Brandon Ferguson in the Democratic primary.

Hatfield went on to face popular local radio personality and pastor Johnny Kincaid. On November 8, 2016, Hatfield defeated Kincaid in the general election with 59% of the vote to Kincaid's 40%.

=== 2018 ===
Hatfield ran unopposed in both the primary and general elections.

=== 2020 ===
Hatfield ran unopposed for the Democratic primary. In the general election, he was challenged by Republican nominee and local military veteran Gregory Peete. Hatfield won reelection to a third term, defeating Peete 63%–36%.

=== 2022 ===
Hatfield won the 2022 election.

=== 2024 ===
Hatfield defeated Molly Briles in the 2024 election for Vanderburgh County Circuit Court judge.

== Personal life ==
Hatfield resides in Evansville, Indiana, with his wife Kendra Hatfield. Together, they have two daughters, Olivia and Rose. Kendra is a pediatric nurse at St. Vincent's Evansville. The Hatfields are Roman Catholic and are active on local boards and committees, particularly for the protection and care of children.
