= Alex Burton (politician) =

American politician

Member of the Indiana House of Representatives from the 77th district
- Incumbent
- Assumed office November 19, 2024
- Preceded by: Ryan Hatfield

President of Evansville City Council
- In office January 13, 2020 – November 19, 2024
- Preceded by: James Brinkmeyer
- Succeeded by: Zachary Heronemus

Member of Evansville City Council, Ward 4
- In office January 1, 2020 – November 19, 2024
- Preceded by: Constance Robinson
- Succeeded by: Tanisha Carothers

Personal details
- Born: Alexander Burton Evansville, Indiana
- Party: Democratic
- Education: Indiana State University; Western Kentucky University (BS)

Alex Burton is an American politician serving as a member of the Indiana House of Representatives from the 77th district. He assumed office on November 19, 2024.

== Career ==
Before Burton attended Western Kentucky University he interned with then-mayor of Evansville, Jonathan Weinzapfel. Burton was a city councilor in Evansville.

== Personal life ==
Burton is married to Xavia and they live in Evansville with their child, Arrington, and two dogs.

== Electoral history ==
Evansville City Council Ward 4, 2019
Party	Candidate	Votes	%	±%
Democratic	Alex Burton	1,883	73.4%	+6.29%
Republican	Archie Carter	683	26.6%	+26.6%
Total votes		2,566	100.00%	

Evansville City Council Ward 4, 2023
Party	Candidate	Votes	%	±%
Democratic	Alex Burton	1,898	100.0%	+26.6%
Total votes		1,898	100.00%	

Indiana State House District 77 election, 2024
Party	Candidate	Votes	%	±%
Democratic	Alex Burton	14,395	100.0%	+23.3%
Total votes		14,395	100.00%	
