= Dick Kercher =

American football player (1931–2008)

- Kercher with Tulsa in 1953

No. 43
- Positions: Special teams, halfback, defensive back

Personal information
- Born: March 11, 1932; Evansville, Indiana, U.S.
- Died: November 10, 2024 (aged 92); Rio Rancho, New Mexico, U.S.
- Listed height: 6 ft 2 in (1.88 m)
- Listed weight: 205 lb (93 kg)

Career information
- High school: Reitz Memorial (Evansville)
- College: Tulsa
- NFL draft: 1954: 6th round, 73rd overall pick

Career history
- Detroit Lions (1954); Montreal Alouettes (1959)*
- * Offseason or practice squad member only

Awards and highlights
- All-Missouri Valley Conference (1952)

Career NFL statistics
- Games played: 7
- Starts: 2
- Rushing yards: 1
- Rushing average: 0.3
- Stats at Pro Football Reference

Richard S. Kercher (March 11, 1932 – November 10, 2024) was an American professional football player who played one season with the Detroit Lions of the National Football League. He played collegiately for the University of Tulsa as a left halfback, starting for the top yardage-gaining offense in the country for the 1951 and 1952 seasons.

== Early life ==
Richard S. Kercher was born March 11, 1932, in Evansville, Indiana. He attended Reitz Memorial High School in Evansville, where he was a halfback on the football team, playing both offensively and defensively. He was not a star player during his early high school years, failing to earn a varsity letter as a sophomore and being regarded only as a "promising" reserve left halfback playing out of the single-wing formation as a junior in 1948.

== College career ==
Dick Kercher (L) with his 1953 Tulsa backfield mates, Eddie Hughes (22) and Bill Travnick (23).

Kercher attended the University of Tulsa in Tulsa, Oklahoma.

In 1951 he was part of a Golden Hurricane team which led the nation in total offense and finished second nationally in rushing. In the team's 1951 win against the arch-rival Oklahoma State Cowboys, Kercher turned in two highlight reel-caliber plays — a 70-yard punt return to the house and a wild two-yard touchdown run in which he reversed field all the way back at the 15-yard line to find an opening for the score.

The 1952 Tulsa team was once again an offensive juggernaut, finishing the year with a nation-leading 446.6 yards per game in total offense and 321.5 yards per game rushing. Kercher led the Golden Hurricane in rushing, with 16 carries for 71 yards, but was unable to find the end zone and Tulsa fell to the home team by a score of 14–13.

Following the 1952 season, the Golden Hurricanes were invited to the 1953 Gator Bowl, where they faced the hometown University of Florida Gators. Kercher started for Tulsa at left halfback.

Kercher finished his junior year — the best of his collegiate career — with 120 carries for 684 yards, an average of 5.7 yards per carry. He was named to the All-Missouri Valley Conference team for 1952.

Kercher was hobbled by injury during the 1953 season and did not achieve the numbers put up during the previous year.

He ultimately completed his Bachelor of Arts degree at Tulsa in Industrial Psychology in the spring of 1957.

== Professional career ==
Kercher was selected in the 6th round of the 1954 NFL draft by the Detroit Lions, who made him the 73rd pick of the player lottery. He originally planned to play professionally in Canada, signing a deal with the Ottawa Rough Riders of the Big Four, but ultimately decided to remain in the United States and play with the Lions.

There was little room for him on the offensive side of the ball, however, as the Lions' established left halfback was Hall of Famer Doak Walker. Kercher was formally moved to right halfback but subsequently saw his primary opportunity to play on special teams and the defensive side of the ball.

Kercher played for the Lions in 7 games of the 1954 season, including two starts. His season was short-circuited by a fractured elbow suffered in the November 14 game against the San Francisco 49ers. He was placed on the 30-day injured reserve list by the Lions — effectively ending his season — on November 24.

During his one season in the NFL, Kercher lived in a dilapidated house that he shared with fellow Lions rookies Bill Stits and Bill Bowman — provided gratis by a Lions fan in exchange for a pair of tickets to each home game.

Kercher found the practice schedule in the NFL less difficult than that he experienced at Tulsa, telling one reporter: "I really like this pro ball, but it's nothing like college. At Tulsa we were out knocking heads a couple of times a week — here we scrimmaged only a few times before the exhibition season started in August. Now we never do." He did acknowledge, however, that despite relatively less hitting in practice, "everyone is bigger and everyone is faster than in college."

Although mandatory military service threatened to upend his career in 1955, Kercher told a friendly reporter that "I want to play two or three more years. You make some good business contacts in pro ball. As for where I'll go or what I'll do, I don't know. Just see what develops, I guess."

In January 1955 it was announced that Kercher had indeed been drafted into the U.S. Army, stationed at Fort Riley, Kansas. The 1955 season was therefore lost but hopes were expressed that Kercher would be able to return to the Lions in 1956. This hope was not realized. While Kercher's term of duty ended late in the 1956 season, he ultimately wound up missing that full year as well.

Kercher was able to procure a new contract from the Lions for 1957 Detroit Lions season, however, and he made his way to Lions training camp. After playing with the team throughout the preseason, Kercher fell in the last round of roster cuts, placed on waivers on September 3, his NFL career ended.

== Personal life ==
Kercher's cousin, Bob Kercher, also played in the National Football League, as part of the 1944 roster of the Green Bay Packers.

Kercher died on November 10, 2024, at his home in Rio Rancho, New Mexico.
