= Alvan V. Burch =

American businessperson, public servant, inventor and politician

Alvan Vernon Burch, Sr.
- Alvan V. Burch, Sr. in 1946

Indiana State Auditor
- In office December 1, 1944 – December 1, 1948
- Governor: Henry F. Schricker; Ralph F. Gates
- Preceded by: Richard T. James
- Succeeded by: James M. Propst

Personal details
- Born: May 27, 1886 Crawford County, Illinois, U.S.
- Died: November 21, 1973 (aged 87) Evansville, Indiana, U.S.
- Resting place: Oak Hill Cemetery, Evansville, Indiana, U.S.
- Party: Republican
- Spouse(s): Violet Hadley 1907– Janet Beckhan; Velma Bohier –death
- Occupation: Businessman

Alvan Vernon Burch Sr. (also called A. V. Burch) (May 27, 1886 – November 21, 1973) was an American businessperson, public servant, inventor and politician. He served as chairman of the first Indiana State Highway Commission and was a leader in the development of Highway 40, Highway 50 and the George Rogers Clark Memorial Bridge. Burch served as Indiana State Auditor from 1944 until 1948. As long-time president of Burch Plow Company, he co-invented a rotary wheel hoe.

== Early life and career ==
Alvan Vernon Burch was born in a log cabin in Crawford County, Illinois, on May 27, 1886. As an adult, he would tell people he was born in 1901. His parents were Sarah and Jasper Burch. He had many siblings and the family was very poor. Burch's highest level of education was 8th grade.

Burch held a wide variety of jobs in his early life. When he was seventeen, Burch worked for Kelly Axe Factory in Alexandria, Indiana. He also worked at a coal mine. Burch eventually moved to Indianapolis, Indiana, where he worked in the railroad industry. He was a switchman and a dispatcher. Circa 1907, he worked as a motorman on the Martinsville-Indianapolis Interurban Railway. On November 6, 1907, he married his first wife, Violet Hadley, in Mooresville, Indiana. He met Hadley while he was working as a motorman. The couple had three children: twins Harold and Gerald, and Alvan Jr.

The family moved to Mooresville, Indiana, where he owned a grocery store. Burch also worked in insurance during his early career.

== Career ==
Burch and his family returned to Evansville in the late 1910s or early 1920s to work as a sales manager for Blunt Plow Company. He eventually moved up ranks, and within ten years he became sales manager, vice president and eventually president in 1926. He became the owner, renaming the company Burch Plow Company.

Indiana Governor Warren T. McCray appointed Burch, in 1921, to be vicechairman for the first Indiana State Highway Commission. Burch eventually became chairman. During his tenure, the commission built U.S. Route 40 and U.S. Route 50. He designed U.S. Route 41. He lobbied for the George Rogers Clark Memorial Bridge to be built in 1928-29 and was called "instrumental" at ensuring the bridge was completed and funded by taxpayer money.

In the 1940s, Burch got involved in politics. He served as city comptroller of Evansville. He was a delegate to the 1944 Republican National Convention. That same year, he ran for Indiana State Auditor and won. He held the position from December 1944 until December 1948. After, he unsuccessfully ran for three additional offices: United States Congress, Indiana Governor, and Mayor of Evansville. As of 1949, he was still president of Burch Plow Works. That year, he and John F. Rude received a patent for a rotary hoe wheel.

== Later life and death ==
Burch divorced his first wife, Violet after almost 50 years of marriage for a much younger hairdresser named Janet Beckhan, they divorced some time later and he then married Velma Bohie, who ran the hat shop in the McCurdy Hotel. He was active in numerous service organizations, including Kiwanis, Shriners, Loyal Order of Moose, Benevolent and Protective Order of Elks, the Service Star Legion, and he was a Mason. He co-founded the Evansville Association of the Blind.

He died on November 21, 1973, in Evansville.

== Legacy ==
Burch's papers are held in the collection of the Indiana State Library.

== See also ==
- 1934 Evansville, Indiana mayoral election
- 1937 Evansville, Indiana mayoral election
