= Kyle Kuric =

American-Slovak basketball player (born 1989)

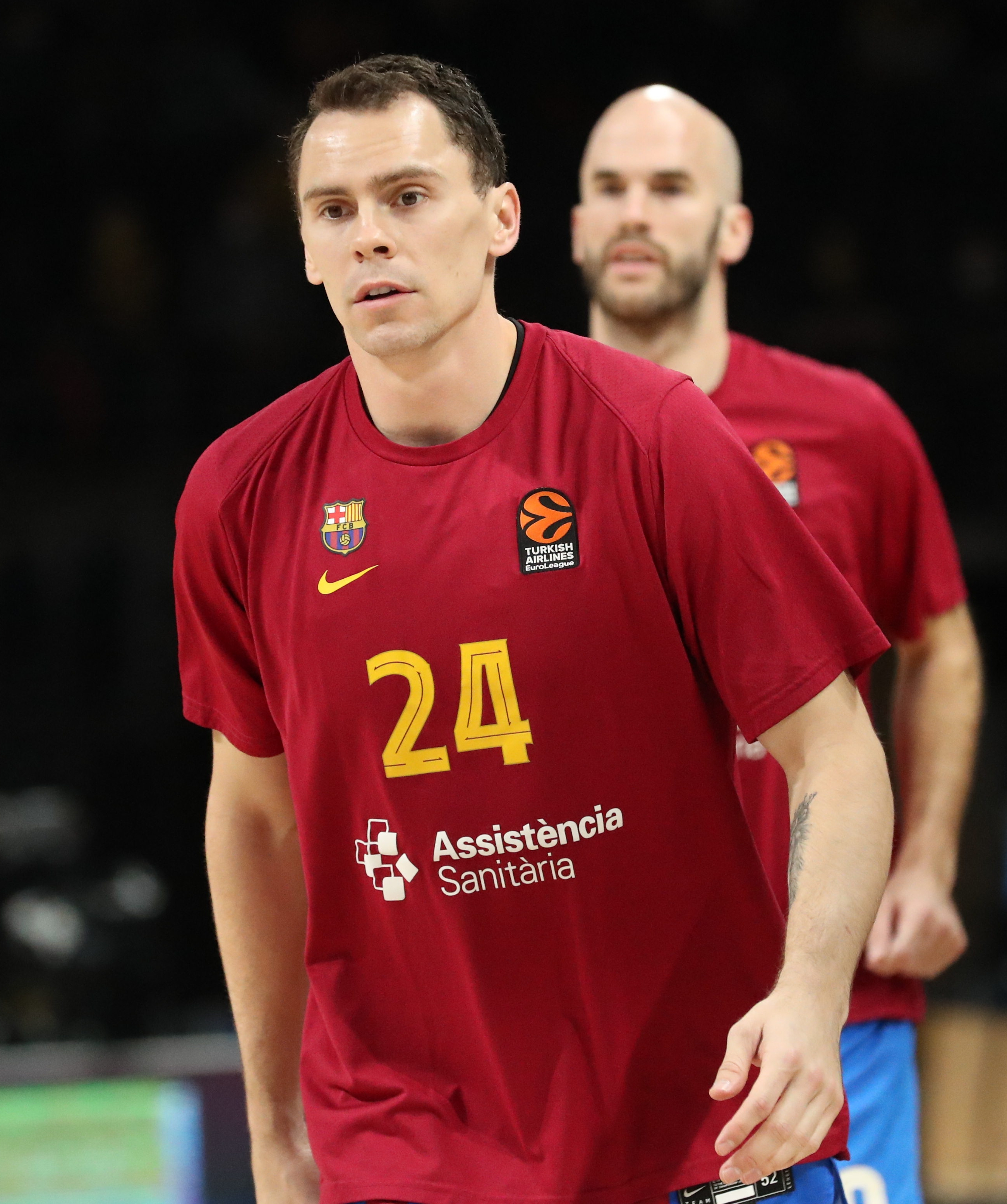
- Kuric with FC Barcelona in 2022

No. 24 – BC Andorra
- Position: Shooting guard
- League: Liga ACB

Personal information
- Born: August 25, 1989 (age 37) Evansville, Indiana, U.S.
- Listed height: 6 ft 4 in (1.93 m)
- Listed weight: 195 lb (88 kg)

Career information
- High school: Memorial (Evansville, Indiana)
- College: Louisville (2008–2012)
- NBA draft: 2012: undrafted
- Playing career: 2012–present

Career history
- 2012–2014: CB Estudiantes
- 2014–2017: Herbalife Gran Canaria
- 2017–2018: Zenit Saint Petersburg
- 2018–2023: FC Barcelona
- 2023–2024: Zenit Saint Petersburg
- 2024–present: BC Andorra

Career highlights
- 2× EuroLeague 50–40–90 club (2021, 2022); 3× All-EuroCup Second Team (2015, 2017, 2018); 2x Liga ACB champion (2021, 20213); 3× Spanish Cup winner (2020, 2021, 2022); Spanish Supercup winner (2016); Spanish Supercup MVP (2016); VTB United League Supercup winner (2023); VTB United League Supercup MVP (2023); All-VTB United League Second Team (2018)
- Stats at Basketball Reference

Kyle Matthew Kuric (born August 25, 1989) is an American-Slovak professional basketball player for BC Andorra of the Liga ACB. Kuric grew up in Evansville, Indiana, and graduated from Memorial High School in 2008. Kuric is most noted for leading the Louisville Cardinals to a win in the last game Louisville played at Freedom Hall, and being named winner of the "2011 Papa John's Dunk of the Year".

== Early life and education ==
Kuric is of Slovak descent, and also has a Slovak passport.

Kuric attended Reitz Memorial High School in Evansville, Indiana, and as a senior averaged 20.8 points, 6.7 rebounds, 1.8 steals and 1.3 blocked shots. That year, he led a senior-heavy team to the school's first sectional championship in 12 years. Memorial was ranked number 1 in class 3A in Indiana for several weeks during the season. Kuric was named the 2008 Evansville Courier & Press All-Metro Player of the Year, a second team AP all-state honoree and was ranked No. 147 in the ESPN 150 listing of the top players in the class of 2008. He was selected to the Indiana All-Star team in 2008.

Following high school he signed a letter of intent to play for the University of Louisville Cardinals.

== College career ==
Kuric saw little playing time his freshman year mainly playing behind Terrence Williams, who was a lottery pick in the 2009 NBA draft. Kuric's most notable game came as a sophomore during Louisville's final game held in Freedom Hall against the then No. 1 ranked Syracuse Orange. He scored 22 points, all in the second half, to lead Louisville to the upset win. Kuric added three rebounds, two assists, a steal, and four dunks while connecting on 9-of-11 field goals (4-of-6 three-pointers). Pat Forde of ESPN called him the "unlikely hero" of that game.

Kuric ended his junior season as the 2nd leading scorer for a Louisville team that overachieved relative to expectations . Preseason predictions had them 8th in the Big East Conference and they did not receive a single vote in the preseason top 25 poll nationally. The Cardinals ended the season with a record of 25–10 and ranked number 11. They placed third in the Big East regular season and reached the final game of the Big East tournament losing to UConn Huskies by 3 points. The Cardinals were seeded 4th in the NCAA tournament, but were upset in the first round by 13th seed Morehead State University. Kuric came on strong in Big East Conference play by averaging a team-high 15.1 points and 5.8 rebounds over the last 13 games, hitting 34-of-74 three-pointers (.459) and 53.8 percent from the field. He was third in the Big East in Three-point field goal percentage (.449, 70-of-156) and was seventh in field goal percentage(.514).

Kuric scored the winning layup on a pass from Preston Knowles with four seconds left to cap a 24–5 run against Marquette Golden Eagles in the last 5:44 of the game. This game has been dubbed the "Miracle on Main Street". Kuric was selected to the Big East Honor Roll on February 14 after averaging 25.5 points, 5.5 rebounds and hitting 62.1 percent from the field—including 9-of-14 three-point goals (.643) – as Louisville split games against Notre Dame and Syracuse.

Kyle Kuric's monster slam dunk in the waning seconds of the first half at Notre Dame was voted as the "2011 Papa John's Dunk of the Year". Kuric's dunk received 45 percent of the votes in a Facebook fan poll to earn the national title. Kuric is also regarded as a fan favorite amongst die-hard Louisville basketball fans. On ranker.com, a site designed to encourage fan engagement, he's listed at #28 on all-time favorite Louisville players.

Kuric was selected a tri-captain of the 2011–12 University of Louisville Men's basketball team along with Peyton Siva and Chris Smith. Kuric was the leading scorer during his senior season. The Cardinals won the Big East tournament and Kuric was named to the Big East All-tournament team. Louisville went to the Final Four after a comeback win over Florida in the Elite Eight game but lost to Kentucky in a highly anticipated national semifinal in New Orleans.

Kuric was crowned Louisville's homecoming king on October 9, 2010, at halftime of the Cards' homecoming football game vs. Memphis Tigers. He is frequently called "King Kyle" because of this selection.

Kuric has some significant off-court accomplishments as well. He has been selected for the Dean's List and AD honor roll at U of L several times. He also served as the student representative on the U of L Athletic Association Board of Directors, the governing body for the Cardinals' athletic department. He was honored as U of L's Most Outstanding Sophomore in April 2010. During his senior year at Louisville, Kuric founded a charity to assist children in the Kentuckiana area. Kyle's Korner for Kids in cooperation with the University of Louisville athletic department collected halloween costumes for the Home for the Innocents and toys for children hospitalized on Christmas at Kosairs Children's Hospital.

=== College honors ===
- 4x Big East Men's Basketball Tournament (2009–2012)
- Big East All Tournament Team 2012
- 4x NCAA Tournament Appearance (2009–2012)
- Final Four 2012
- 2011 Dunk of the Year Winner
- 2012 Capitol One Academic All District 2 Team

== Professional career ==
After playing at Louisville, in the NCAA Division I, Kuric started his pro career in 2012, with the Spanish club Asefa Estudiantes, where he stayed for two seasons, until signing with Herbalife Gran Canaria on 31 July 2014.

Kuric played for the Phoenix Suns' summer team in the 2016 NBA Summer League in Las Vegas. He returned to Herbalife Gran Canaria for the 2016–17 season. Herbalife Gran Canaria won the season's curtain raiser competition, the 2016 Spanish Supercup in September, and Kuric was named the MVP of the tournament.

On July 5, 2017, Kuric signed a two-year deal with Russian club Zenit Saint Petersburg. On July 18, 2018, Kuric signed a two-year deal with FC Barcelona Lassa of the Liga ACB and the EuroLeague after reached an agreement with Zenit Saint Petersburg. He averaged 9.4 points per game in EuroLeague in 2019–20. On July 7, 2020, Kuric officially renewed his contract with the Spanish club through 2023.

On June 29, 2023, Kuric returned to Zenit Saint Petersburg. He returned to the Liga ACB in 2024, signing with MoraBanc Andorra.

== Career statistics ==
Legend
GP	Games played	GS	Games started	MPG	Minutes per game
FG%	Field-goal percentage	3P%	3-point field-goal percentage	FT%	Free-throw percentage
RPG	Rebounds per game	APG	Assists per game	SPG	Steals per game
BPG	Blocks per game	PPG	Points per game	PIR	Performance index rating
**Bold**	Career high

=== EuroLeague ===
*	Led the league

Year	Team	GP	GS	MPG	FG%	3P%	FT%	RPG	APG	SPG	BPG	PPG	PIR
2018–19	Barcelona	34	**14**	19.7	.442	.397	.865	**2.1**	.8	**.8**	**.1**	8.4	7.6
2019–20	Barcelona	27	3	19.4	.471	.443	.892	**2.1**	**.9**	.7	**.1**	**9.4**	**8.9**
2020–21	Barcelona	**39**	1	18.8	**.558**	**.562***	**.961***	1.6	.5	.4	**.1**	8.7	8.2
2021–22	Barcelona	37	12	**20.1**	.455	.400	.912	2.0	.8	.5	.0	7.9	7.3
2022–23	Barcelona	22	5	13.6	.437	.436	.909	1.2	.5	.7	.0	5.0	4.7
Career		159	35	18.7	.476	.448	.912	1.8	.7	.6	.1	8.0	7.5

=== Domestic Leagues ===
Year	Team	League	GP	MPG	FG%	3P%	FT%	RPG	APG	SPG	BPG	PPG
2012–13	CB Estudiantes	Liga ACB	33	21.8	.500	.394	.879	2.0	.9	.7	.1	11.2
2013–14	CB Estudiantes	Liga ACB	34	**28.2**	.437	.401	.875	3.3	1.0	1.1	**.3**	13.5
2014–15	Herbalife Gran Canaria	Liga ACB	34	27.7	.456	.388	.936	2.1	1.1	1.0	.2	12.1
2014–15	Herbalife Gran Canaria	EuroCup	24	26.8	.506	.462	.853	2.5	**1.5**	.9	**.3**	13.8
2015–16	Herbalife Gran Canaria	Liga ACB	10	16.0	.482	.375	**1.000**	2.1	.3	1.0	.1	7.9
2015–16	Herbalife Gran Canaria	EuroCup	3	24.0	.536	.546	.500	2.0	1.3	.0	**.3**	14.7
2016–17	Herbalife Gran Canaria	Liga ACB	32	22.2	.467	.411	.833	2.6	.9	.6	.2	12.5
2016–17	Herbalife Gran Canaria	EuroCup	16	23.4	.507	.500	.878	3.0	.8	.9	.1	15.1
2017–18	Zenit Saint Petersburg	VTB United League	29	25.4	.472	.386	.822	3.4	**1.5**	.9	.2	**16.4**
2017–18	Zenit Saint Petersburg	EuroCup	19	24.7	.452	.433	.877	**3.5**	1.4	.5	.2	15.3
2018–19	FC Barcelona Bàsquet	Liga ACB	30	21.0	.455	.414	.889	2.1	.8	.8	.1	9.4
2019–20	FC Barcelona Bàsquet	Liga ACB	23	20.7	.412	.353	.902	2.2	1.2	.9	.1	8.4
2020–21	FC Barcelona Bàsquet	Liga ACB	**40**	18.6	.524	.458	.906	1.7	.6	.5	.1	9.0
Career		All Leagues	427	22.4	.475	.425	.877	2.4	.9	.7	.2	11.3

== Personal life ==
Kuric was born in Pennsylvania, but grew up in Evansville, Indiana. He has one sister, Katie Kuric (b, 1988 July 10), who was a goalkeeper on the women's soccer team at the University of Louisville. Kuric's father is a neurosurgeon, and his mother is a nurse practitioner. Kuric married Taraneh Momeni Kuric on July 5, 2013. He is the father of twin sons and a daughter.

On 5 November 2015, Kuric had surgery to remove brain tumors that were diagnosed two days before. He eventually underwent two additional surgeries to control brain swelling and to place a skull implant. He made a much anticipated return to the court five months after surgery, making 3 of 4 three point shots in his first game back at Gran Canaria.

On 7 September 2020, Kuric underwent surgical procedure to replace the cranial plate implanted in 2015. The plate had cracked as a result of a collision in practice. He returned to practice with FC Barcelona in October 2020.
