= 2020 Indiana Attorney General election =

- November 3, 2020
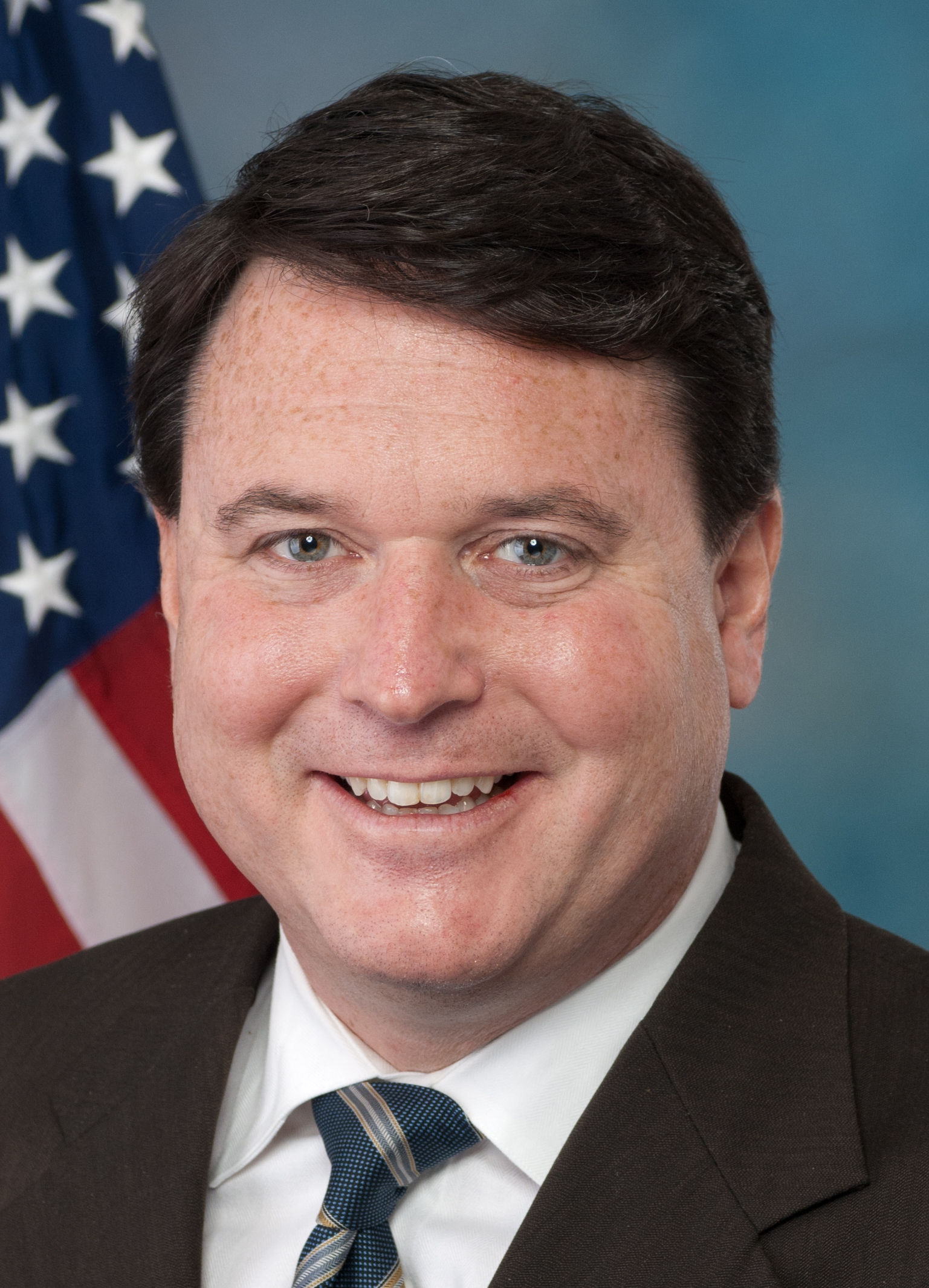

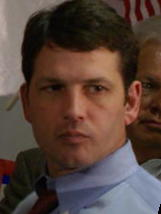
Candidate	Todd Rokita	Jonathan Weinzapfel
Party	Republican	Democratic
Popular vote	1,717,924	1,226,938
Percentage	58.34%	41.66%
- Rokita: 50–60% 60–70% 70–80% 80–90% >90% Weinzapfel: 50–60% 60–70% 70–80% 80–90% >90% Tie: 50% No data
Attorney General before election
Curtis Hill
Republican
Elected Attorney General
Todd Rokita
Republican

The 2020 Indiana Attorney General election was held on November 3, 2020, to elect the attorney general of the U.S. state of Indiana. The Democratic primary convention was scheduled for June 13, 2020. The Republican primary convention was scheduled with a live stream on June 18, 2020, followed by mail-in voting between June 22 and July 9.

Incumbent Attorney General Curtis Hill ran for re-election, but was defeated at the Republican nominating convention by former U.S. Representative Todd Rokita, who eventually won after three rounds of votes. Jonathan Weinzapfel, former mayor of Evansville, narrowly won the Democratic nomination at the party's nominating convention.

In the general election, Rokita defeated Weinzapfel by approximately 500,000 votes, a margin of more than 16 percentage points. Due to a smaller third-party vote, both Rokita and Weinzapfel received a larger percentage of the vote than their party's candidates in the state's presidential and gubernatorial elections. Rokita carried Tippecanoe County, which voted for Democrat Joe Biden in the presidential race, while Weinzapfel carried his home of Vanderburgh County, which voted for Republicans Donald Trump and Eric Holcomb in the presidential and gubernatorial races.

== Republican convention ==
=== Candidates ===
==== Nominee ====
- Todd Rokita, former U.S. representative from Indiana's 4th district

==== Eliminated at convention ====
- Nate Harter, Decatur County prosecutor
- Curtis Hill, incumbent attorney general
- John Westercamp, attorney

==== Withdrawn ====
- Adam Krupp, former Indiana Department of Revenue commissioner (endorsed Harter)

=== Endorsements ===
Nate Harter

State legislators

- Stephen Bartels, state representative
- Michael Crider, state senator
- Mark Messmer, majority leader of the Indiana Senate
- Jeff Raatz, state senator
- Cindy Ziemke, state representative

Individuals

- Adam Krupp, former Indiana Department of Revenue commissioner
Curtis Hill

State officials

- Leslie Rutledge, Arkansas attorney general since 2015

State legislators

- Christy Stutzman, state representative
- Jim Tomes, state senator
Todd Rokita

State legislators

- Michael Aylesworth, state representative
- Karen Engleman, state representative
- Ryan Mishler, state senator
- Rick Niemeyer, state senator
- Heath VanNatter, state representative
- Dennis Zent, state representative
John Westercamp

U.S. representatives

- David M. McIntosh, former U.S. representative for IN-02 (1995–2001)

State legislators

- Eric Bassler, state senator
- Dave Heine, state representative
- Mike Speedy, state representative
- Timothy Wesco, state representative

=== Results ===
Republican convention results
Candidate	Round 1			Round 2			Round 3	
Candidate	Votes	%	Transfer	Votes	%	Transfer	Votes	%
Todd Rokita	479	27.37	+122	601	34.66	+272	873	52.15
Curtis Hill (inc.)	655	37.43	+46	701	40.43	+100	801	47.85
Nate Harter	327	18.69	+105	432	24.91	Eliminated		
John Westercamp	289	16.51	Eliminated					
Active ballots	1,750	100.00		1,734	100.00		1,674	100.00
Exhausted ballots	7	0.40	+16	23	1.31	+60	83	4.72
Total ballots	1,757	100.00		1,757	100.00		1,757	100.00

== Democratic convention ==
=== Candidates ===
==== Nominee ====
- Jonathan Weinzapfel, former mayor of Evansville

==== Eliminated at convention ====
- Karen Tallian, Indiana state senator

=== Results ===
Democratic convention results
Candidate	Round 1	
Candidate	Votes	%
Jonathan Weinzapfel	1,057	51.16
Karen Tallian	1,009	48.84
Total ballots	2,066	100.00

== General election ==
=== Predictions ===
Source	Ranking	As of
The Cook Political Report	Tossup	June 25, 2020

=== Polling ===
Poll source	Date(s) administered	Sample size (Note: Key: A – all adults RV – registered voters LV – likely voters V – unclear)	Margin of error	Todd Rokita (R)	Jonathan Weinzapfel (D)	Undecided
SurveyUSA/Election Twitter	Oct 8–13, 2020	527 (LV)	± 5.2%	48%	35%	17%
Change Research/IndyPolitics/SnydeReport	Sep 3–7, 2020	1,033 (LV)	± 3.1%	49%	34%	18%

Hypothetical polling

Curtis Hill vs. Karen Tallian

Poll source	Date(s) administered	Sample size	Margin of error	Curtis Hill (R)	Karen Tallian (D)	Undecided
Victoria Research/Tallian for Attorney General (Note: This poll is sponsored by Karen Tallian's campaign)	May 21–23, 2020	894 (LV)	± 3.3%	36%	36%	28%

Curtis Hill vs. Jonathan Weinzapfel

Poll source	Date(s) administered	Sample size	Margin of error	Curtis Hill (R)	Jonathan Weinzapfel (D)	Undecided
Victoria Research/Tallian for Attorney General	May 21–23, 2020	894 (LV)	± 3.3%	37%	35%	–
BK Strategies/Eric Holcomb for Governor (Note: Poll sponsored by Eric Holcomb's campaign)	May 20–21, 2020	600 (LV)	± 4%	32%	39%	–

=== Results ===
2020 Indiana attorney general election
Party	Candidate	Votes	%	±%
Republican	Todd Rokita	1,722,007	58.34	▼3.97
Democratic	Jonathan Weinzapfel	1,229,644	41.66	▲3.97
Total votes		2,951,651	100.00	
Republican hold				

==== By county ====
Vote breakdown by county
	Todd Rokita Republican		Jonathan Weinzapfel Democratic		Total
County	Votes	%	Votes	%	Votes
Adams	10,433	75.2%	3,439	24.8%	13,872
Allen	95,651	57.9%	69,691	42.1%	165,342
Bartholomew	22,714	65.1%	12,151	34.9%	34,865
Benton	2,937	72.6%	1,111	27.4%	4,048
Blackford	3,766	72.7%	1,413	27.3%	5,179
Boone	23,915	63.9%	13,506	36.1%	37,421
Brown	5,625	64.2%	3,141	35.8%	8,766
Carroll	7,067	74.7%	2,399	25.3%	9,466
Cass	10,506	70.1%	4,478	29.9%	14,984
Clark	32,918	59.5%	22,416	40.5%	55,334
Clay	8,982	76.5%	2,765	23.5%	11,747
Clinton	9,269	72.9%	3,451	27.1%	12,720
Crawford	3,089	67.4%	1,494	32.6%	4,583
Daviess	8,931	78.3%	2,473	21.7%	11,404
Dearborn	19,565	78.4%	5,401	21.6%	24,966
Decatur	9,118	77.4%	2,665	22.6%	11,783
Dekalb	13,704	73.3%	5,002	26.7%	18,706
Delaware	26,834	57.0%	20,242	43.0%	47,076
Dubois	13,032	61.7%	8,084	38.3%	21,116
Elkhart	48,604	65.9%	25,171	34.1%	73,775
Fayette	7,354	75.8%	2,343	24.2%	9,697
Floyd	23,932	58.6%	16,894	41.4%	40,826
Fountain	6,050	77.0%	1,811	23.0%	7,861
Franklin	9,144	81.2%	2,120	18.8%	11,264
Fulton	6,561	73.2%	2,401	26.8%	8,962
Gibson	9,811	61.6%	6,122	38.4%	15,933
Grant	18,266	69.9%	7,872	30.1%	26,138
Greene	10,578	73.3%	3,859	26.7%	14,437
Hamilton	109,798	58.6%	77,549	41.4%	187,347
Hancock	29,571	70.6%	12,324	29.4%	41,895
Harrison	14,237	72.2%	5,493	27.8%	19,730
Hendricks	55,159	64.2%	30,711	35.8%	85,870
Henry	14,689	70.7%	6,084	29.3%	20,773
Howard	26,399	66.4%	13,369	33.4%	39,768
Huntington	12,806	75.0%	4,258	25.0%	17,064
Jackson	13,884	76.0%	4,374	24.0%	18,258
Jasper	11,265	75.5%	3,658	24.5%	14,923
Jay	6,202	75.1%	2,051	24.9%	8,253
Jefferson	9,291	66.9%	4,591	33.1%	13,882
Jennings	9,016	76.8%	2,731	23.2%	11,747
Johnson	51,302	68.9%	23,159	31.1%	74,461
Knox	10,541	68.4%	4,881	31.6%	15,422
Kosciusko	26,329	76.4%	8,144	23.6%	34,473
Lagrange	7,971	77.7%	2,294	22.3%	10,265
Lake	91,316	42.9%	121,406	57.1%	212,722
LaPorte	25,095	53.1%	22,163	46.9%	47,258
Lawrence	15,164	75.3%	4,975	24.7%	20,139
Madison	30,596	59.9%	20,511	40.1%	51,107
Marion	141,939	36.6%	246,140	63.4%	388,079
Marshall	13,706	71.5%	5,474	28.5%	19,180
Martin	3,645	73.9%	1,290	26.1%	4,935
Miami	10,594	76.3%	3,297	23.7%	13,891
Monroe	23,187	37.6%	38,405	62.4%	61,592
Montgomery	13,018	77.4%	3,795	22.6%	16,813
Morgan	27,058	77.6%	7,826	22.4%	34,884
Newton	4,942	76.8%	1,496	23.2%	6,438
Noble	13,717	74.3%	4,753	25.7%	18,470
Ohio	2,315	75.9%	734	24.1%	3,049
Orange	6,213	73.9%	2,192	26.1%	8,405
Owen	6,921	72.7%	2,597	27.3%	9,518
Parke	5,058	75.2%	1,667	24.8%	6,725
Perry	4,663	55.3%	3,763	44.7%	8,426
Pike	3,948	65.9%	2,043	34.1%	5,991
Porter	46,276	54.1%	39,256	45.9%	85,532
Posey	7,605	57.6%	5,595	42.4%	13,200
Pulaski	4,098	73.8%	1,454	26.2%	5,552
Putnam	12,186	76.4%	4,099	23.6%	16,285
Randolph	7,994	75.5%	2,589	24.5%	10,583
Ripley	11,071	79.6%	2,841	20.4%	13,912
Rush	5,762	75.5%	1,871	24.5%	7,633
Scott	6,496	69.0%	2,915	31.0%	9,411
Shelby	13,889	72.7%	5,207	27.3%	19,096
Spencer	6,138	58.7%	4,314	41.3%	10,452
St. Joseph	53,530	48.6%	56,536	51.4%	110,066
Starke	6,861	70.5%	2,877	29.5%	9,738
Steuben	11,432	72.1%	4,413	27.9%	15,845
Sullivan	6,082	70.0%	2,609	30.0%	8,691
Switzerland	2,967	75.1%	984	24.9%	3,951
Tippecanoe	36,476	51.8%	33,940	48.2%	70,416
Tipton	5,824	74.6%	1,987	25.4%	7,811
Union	2,625	78.7%	711	21.3%	3,336
Vanderburgh	36,681	47.5%	40,531	52.5%	77,212
Vermillion	4,727	66.1%	2,428	33.9%	7,155
Vigo	22,772	56.6%	17,474	43.4%	40,246
Wabash	10,628	75.8%	3,402	24.2%	14,030
Warren	3,397	76.9%	1,019	23.1%	4,416
Warrick	18,735	56.9%	14,194	43.1%	32,929
Washington	8,980	76.0%	2,829	24.0%	11,809
Wayne	17,845	65.7%	9,319	34.3%	27,164
Wells	10,799	78.1%	3,029	21.9%	13,828
White	7,940	73.2%	2,902	26.8%	10,842
Whitley	12,528	74.4%	4,300	25.6%	16,828

Counties that flipped from Republican to Democratic

- St. Joseph (largest municipality: South Bend)
- Vanderburgh (largest city: Evansville)

==== By congressional district ====
Rokita won seven of nine congressional districts.

District	Rokita	Weinzapfel	Representative
1st	46%	54%	Frank J. Mrvan
2nd	61%	39%	Jackie Walorski
3rd	66%	34%	Jim Banks
4th	66%	34%	Jim Baird
5th	54%	46%	Victoria Spartz
6th	70%	30%	Greg Pence
7th	37%	63%	André Carson
8th	60%	40%	Larry Bucshon
9th	62%	38%	Trey Hollingsworth

== See also ==
- 2020 Indiana elections
