= Russell G. Lloyd Sr. =

American politician

28th Mayor of Evansville
- In office January 1, 1972 – January 1, 1980
- Preceded by: Frank F. McDonald
- Succeeded by: Michael Vandeveer

Personal details
- Born: March 29, 1932
- Died: March 21, 1980 (age 47)
- Party: Republican
- Spouse: Genevieve A. "Genna" Lloyd
- Children: 6, including Russell G. Lloyd Jr.

Russell G. Lloyd Sr. (March 29, 1932 – March 21, 1980) was an American politician who served as mayor of Evansville, Indiana from 1972 until 1980. He was assassinated later that year.

== Career ==
Loyd was an alternate delegate from Indiana to the 1972 Republican National Convention. He was the only Republican to be twice elected mayor of Evansville until the 2015 re-election of Lloyd Winnecke. In the 1960s, Lloyd was an attorney for the Legal Aid Society of Vanderburgh County.

== Murder ==
Evansville citizen Julia Van Orden had a history as a "constant complainer" according to city police and had claimed harassment from officials inspecting her home. On March 18, 1980, Van Orden had thrown a brick at a city inspector's vehicle windshield when he came to inspect an addition to her house. The following morning, Van Orden, believing Lloyd was still the mayor (his term had actually expired in January of that year), arrived at his home. She shot Lloyd four times with a handgun, in the head, neck, and shoulders, in a fit of anger after a brief argument. Van Orden fled, and Lloyd was taken to the hospital, where a brain scan indicated brain death. Doctors announced "there is no hope" shortly before turning off Lloyd's medical ventilator.

=== Aftermath ===
Though Van Orden's attorney argued she was too mentally ill to have understood her actions, she was nonetheless convicted and sentenced to between 20 and 40 years in prison. Days before what would have been her release in 2000, she was committed to Logansport State Hospital in Logansport, Indiana, where on August 22, 2006, she allegedly stabbed a hospital employee and was charged with attempted murder. During her trial for the attack, Van Orden was found guilty but mentally ill. Nevertheless, she was sentenced to 50 years in prison for the attack, and she died in the Indiana Women's Prison's medical ward in 2014.

== Personal life ==
Lloyd's son, Russell G. Lloyd Jr., served as mayor of Evansville from 2000 to 2004.

== Offices ==
Political offices
Preceded by Frank F. McDonald	Mayor of Evansville, Indiana; 1972–1980	Succeeded by Michael Vandeveer

== See also ==
- Lloyd Expressway
- List of assassinated American politicians
