= Gail Riecken =

American politician (born 1945)

Member of the Indiana House of Representatives from the 77th district
- In office November 5, 2008 – November 9, 2016
- Preceded by: Phil Hoy
- Succeeded by: Ryan Hatfield

Personal details
- Born: November 9, 1945 (age 80)
- Party: Democratic
- Spouse: Ronald Riecken
- Children: Julia Belle Riecken Langerak and Katie Riecken Parker
- Parent(s): Ed and Mille Engel
- Education: Indiana University
- Alma mater: Benjamin Bosse High School
- Occupation: Real estate broker, corporate relations, riverboat captain

Gail Riecken (née Engel; born November 9, 1945) is a former Democratic member of the Indiana House of Representatives, representing the 77th District. She was a candidate for Mayor of Evansville, the third-largest city in the state, in the 2015 election.

== Biographical Information ==
=== Personal details ===
Gail's parents were named Ed and Mille Engel. Gail Engel graduated from Benjamin Bosse High School in Evansville and earned her BA in Sociology and Social Work from Indiana University. Gail and Ron Riecken were married in 1968 and have two daughters, Julia Belle Riecken Langerak and Katie Riecken Parker. They also have three grandchildren named Joey, Martha, and George.

=== Career ===
She was a real estate broker and riverboat captain prior to her involvement in electoral politics. From 2000 until 2004, Riecken was an Economic Development specialist with the Indiana Department of Workforce Development. In 2004, Mayor Jonathan Weinzapfel appointed Riecken as Director of the City Parks and Recreation Department where she served until December 2007.

== Political career ==
=== Election history ===
Gail Riecken was first elected to the Evansville City Council in 1989 and was elected again at-large in 1991 and 1995. Riecken ran for Congress in 1998 as the Democratic nominee in Indiana's 8th congressional district but lost in the general election to the incumbent Republican John Hostettler. In 1999, she ran for the mayor of Evansville in the Democratic primary but lost to Democrat Rick Borries. In 2008, Gail Riecken first won election to the Indiana House of Representatives in District 77 in an unopposed race. In 2010, Riecken won re-election by narrowly defeating Republican Cheryl Musgrave by a margin of 7,547 to 7,379 (51% to 49%). In 2012, in a district with redrawn lines favoring Democrats, Riecken defeated Republican Alan Leibundguth 64.4% to 35.6%. In 2014 Riecken won re-election by defeating Republican Jeremy Heath 62% to 38%.

Indiana House of Representatives, District 77 General Election, November 2, 2010

Candidate	Affiliation	Support	Outcome
Gail Riecken	Democrat	7,547	51%
Cheryl Musgrave	Republican	7,379	49%

Indiana House of Representatives, District 77 General Election, November 6, 2012

Candidate	Affiliation	Support	Outcome
Gail Riecken	Democrat	14,037	64.4%
Alan Leibundguth	Republican	7,775	35.6%

== Controversies ==
=== 2011 Legislative walkout ===
Riecken and thirty-six other Democratic representatives participated in a legislative walkout on February 22, 2011, in opposition to proposed legislation limiting union powers in Indiana. The Democratic departure left the House void of a quorum, leaving only 58 of the 67 representatives needed to establish a quorum. The Democrats ended the standoff after 36 days, returning on March 28, 2011.

=== Indiana's Religious Freedom Act ===
Riecken was the only southern Indiana legislator to vote against Indiana's proposal of the Religious Freedom Restoration Act. Riecken stated that the law “will allow individuals to ignore any law they choose, simply because they feel it conflicts with their religious beliefs. It will pave the way for intolerance of others.”
