= Lloyd Expressway =

Highway in Indiana

- The Lloyd

Route information
- Maintained by Indiana Department of Transportation
- Length: 14.3 mi (23.0 km)
- Existed: July 19, 1988–present
- Component highways: SR 62 west of US 41; SR 66 east of US 41

Major junctions
- West end: Posey/Vanderburgh county line
- University Parkway in Vanderburgh County; US 41 in Evansville; I-69 in Evansville
- East end: Vanderburgh/Warrick county line

Location
- Country: United States
- State: Indiana
- Counties: Vanderburgh

Highway system
- Indiana State Highway System; Interstate; US; State; Scenic

The Lloyd Expressway is a major east–west traffic artery located in Vanderburgh County, Indiana. The route primarily runs through Evansville, Indiana, reaching from Interstate 69 on the east side of the city to the Posey County line west of the city limits. West of US 41, the expressway is signed as Indiana State Road 62 (SR 62). East of US 41, it is signed as Indiana State Road 66 (SR 66).

== History ==
Before the expressway was built, east–west traffic across Evansville was handled by a pair of streets: Division Street to the east of Main Street, and Pennsylvania Avenue to the west. These roads were congested and dangerous. For a short stretch, Division Street ran in tandem with a busy railroad track. The unacceptable condition of this route necessitated an expressway.

The road was built in stages. The west section of the expressway was completed in the 1950s, ending at Fulton Avenue with plans to continue it further east at a later date. It wasn't until the 1970s and 80s that local officials succeeded in securing federal funding to finish construction. Key to this effort was popular Evansville mayor Russell G. Lloyd, Sr., who was assassinated in 1980 after he had left office. The expressway is named in his honor.

In the spring of 1983, buildings in the expressway's path were demolished, and construction began on July 29, 1983. Five years later, the road finally opened on July 19, 1988. Construction on the eastern phase cost $160 million.

Since opening, the state has made gradual improvements to the road. In 2008, construction began on a $32 million diamond interchange at Fulton Avenue near downtown. This replaced the at-grade signaled intersection that was there previously. In 2014, a $19 million project was started to reconfigure the interchange with US 41 from a partial cloverleaf, with traffic lights on the Lloyd Expressway, into a full cloverleaf with no signals. There have been proposals for similar projects on other high-traffic intersections, such as Burkhardt Road.

== Route description ==
As one travels along the expressway, upon reaching US 41, one state highway — SR 62 if traveling east or SR 66 if traveling west — leaves the expressway while the other joins the expressway. (To the north, SR 62 and SR 66 both run concurrently with US 41 and eventually turn off in opposite directions).

The expressway contains a mix of intersections and interchanges. Because the route includes several at-grade intersections with stoplights, Evansville residents sometimes use the term "expressway" derisively, or drop it altogether and call it "the Lloyd" instead. Nevertheless, the road actually has many characteristics that fit the standard definition of "expressway." Opposing traffic is separated between intersections and interchanges, largely by medians. There are few driveways along the route, with most access made via side roads. Most driveways that do exist are restricted to right-in/right-out access only.

Along much of its route, especially near the downtown area, the expressway is bordered by Division Street along the north side of the road and John Street along the south side of the road. These two streets act as frontage roads for the expressway; many of the on-ramps and off-ramps from the highway connect with Division Street or John Street instead of the road actually labeled on the exit sign. This allows drivers to continue on to other streets that do not have their own exits.

== Major intersections ==
The entire expressway is in Vanderburgh County.

Location	mi	km	Destinations	Notes
Perry Township	0.0	0.0	Posey County Line Road	At-grade, non-signaled intersection
Perry Township	1.1	1.8	McDowell Road	At-grade, non-signaled intersection. Future reduced conflict intersection (RCI)
Perry Township	1.7	2.7	University Parkway	Diamond interchange; access to University of Southern Indiana
Perry Township	2.4	3.9	Schutte Road	At-grade, signal-controlled intersection. Future restricted crossing u-turn
Perry Township	2.6	4.2	Felstead Road	At-grade, non-signaled intersection. Future eastbound only right-in/right-out
Perry Township	2.8	4.5	Middle Mt Vernon Road	At-grade, non-signaled intersection. Future reduced conflict intersection (RCI)
Perry Township	3.5	5.6	Boehne Camp Road	At-grade, signal-controlled intersection
Evansville	4.0	6.4	Red Bank Road	At-grade, signal-controlled intersection. Future dual displaced left turn
Evansville	4.5	7.2	Rosenberger Avenue	At-grade, signal-controlled intersection.
Evansville	4.8	7.7	Dorothy Drive	Former westbound right-in/right-out; closed due to high accident rate
Evansville	5.2	8.4	Ingle Avenue	Right-in/right-out. Slated for closure by 2024-2026
Evansville	5.3	8.5	Corbierre Avenue	Westbound exit only (to Tekoppel Avenue)
Evansville	5.5	8.9	Barker Avenue	Partial cloverleaf interchange utilizing Igleheart Avenue. Future diamond interchange utilizing Igleheart Avenue
Evansville	5.8	9.3	Lemcke Avenue	Westbound access only; right-in/right-out
Evansville	5.9	9.5	Pennsylvania Street	Eastbound entrance only
Evansville	6.0	9.7	St Joseph Avenue	At-grade, signal-controlled intersection.
Evansville	6.1	9.8	12th Avenue	Westbound access only; right-in/right-out. Slated for closure by 2023
Evansville	6.2	10.0	11th Avenue	Eastbound access only; right-in/right-out. Slated for closure by 2023
Evansville	6.3	10.1	10th Avenue	Right-in/right-out. Slated for closure by 2023
Evansville	6.4	10.3	Wabash Avenue of Flags	At-grade, signal-controlled intersection.
Evansville	7.0	11.3	Fulton Avenue	Diamond interchange, signaled on Fulton Avenue
Evansville	7.4	11.9	Division Street at Mary Street	Former westbound entrance; closed with addition of Fulton Avenue interchange
Evansville	7.6	12.2	John Street at 4th Street	Eastbound entrance only
Evansville	8.0	12.9	John Street at Main Street	Eastbound access only
Evansville	8.0	12.9	Division Street at Main Street	Westbound exit only
Evansville	8.6	13.8	John Street at Garvin Street	Eastbound entrance only
Evansville	8.6	13.8	Division Street at Garvin Street	Westbound exit only
Evansville	9.1	14.6	US 41 / SR 62 east / SR 66 west	Cloverleaf interchange; route transition from SR 62 (west of US 41) to SR 66 (east of US 41)
Evansville	9.4	15.1	Division Street at Willow Road	Westbound access only
Evansville	9.9	15.9	Weinbach Avenue	Diamond interchange, signaled on Weinbach Avenue
Evansville	10.4	16.7	Boeke Road	Diamond interchange, signaled on Boeke Road
Evansville	10.9	17.5	Vann Avenue	Right-in/right-out; former at-grade, signal-controlled intersection.
Evansville	11.3	18.2	Stockwell Road	At-grade, signal-controlled intersection. Future displaced left turn/boulevard left turn hybrid
Evansville	11.9	19.2	Green River Road	Single-point urban interchange
Evansville	12.2	19.6	Cullen Avenue	Eastbound access only; right-in/right-out
Evansville	12.3	19.8	Fielding Road	At-grade, signal-controlled intersection.
Evansville	12.5	20.1	Brentwood Drive	At-grade, signal-controlled intersection; only cross-traffic movement permitted is left turn from eastbound Lloyd Expy
Evansville	12.7	20.4	Kimber Lane	Westbound access only; right-in/right-out
Evansville	12.8	20.6	Williamsburg Drive	Eastbound access only; right-in/right-out
Evansville	12.9	20.8	Burkhardt Road	At-grade, signal-controlled intersection. Future dual displaced left turn
Evansville	13.5	21.7	Cross Pointe Boulevard	At-grade, signal-controlled intersection. Future dual displaced left turn
Evansville	14.1	22.7	I-69 – Evansville, Indianapolis	Cloverleaf interchange
1.000 mi = 1.609 km; 1.000 km = 0.621 mi: Closed/former; Incomplete access; Route transition
