= University Parkway (Evansville) =

Road in Indiana, USA

Coordinates: 38°00′8.3″N 87°40′39″W

University Parkway is a four-lane road that links the Lloyd Expressway (Indiana 62) and the University of Southern Indiana with Interstate 64
