= William Baker (Pennsylvania and Indiana politician) =

American politician (1813–1872)

William H. Baker (1813–1872) was an American politician.

Baker served as a Whig in the Pennsylvania House of Representatives for his native Franklin County from 1848 to 1850. He subsequently moved to Evansville, Indiana, where his younger brother Conrad Baker had already settled, and served as mayor of the city from 1859 to 1868. William Baker was succeeded as mayor by William Hall Walker. After Walker died in office, Eccles G. Van Riper was appointed to the office. Baker returned to the mayoralty after winning a special election on 12 November 1870. Baker also died in office, and another special election, won by Charles H. Butterfield, was held on 8 June 1872.
