= Jonathan Weinzapfel =

American politician

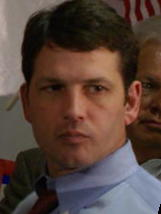

Chancellor of Ivy Tech Community College Southwest
- In office May 12, 2014 – November 30, 2019
- Preceded by: Daniel Schenk
- Succeeded by: Kelly Cozart (interim)

33rd Mayor of Evansville
- In office January 1, 2004 – December 31, 2011
- Preceded by: Russell G. Lloyd Jr.
- Succeeded by: Lloyd Winnecke

Member of the Indiana House of Representatives from the 76th district
- In office January 2, 1999 – January 1, 2004
- Preceded by: Larry Lutz
- Succeeded by: Trent Van Haaften

Personal details
- Born: Jonathan David Weinzapfel; November 16, 1965 (age 60) Evansville, Indiana, U.S.
- Party: Democratic
- Spouse: Patricia Klineman
- Education: Indiana University, Bloomington (BS); Georgetown University (MA); Indiana University, Indianapolis (JD)

Jonathan David Weinzapfel (born November 16, 1965) is an American politician, attorney, businessman, and Democratic nominee for Indiana attorney general in the 2020 election. Weinzapfel formerly served as the 33rd mayor of Evansville, Indiana. He was elected in November 2003 and again in 2007. He did not run for a third term in office, and was succeeded by Lloyd Winnecke. He is a member of the Democratic Party. He most previously served as the chancellor of Ivy Tech Community College's Southwest campus, a position he held from 2014 to 2019.

== Early life and education ==
Born to Ralph and Sylvia Weinzapfel in Evansville, Weinzapfel's father was a member of the Posey County Council and his mother was the executive director of the local YWCA branch. He attended Reitz Memorial High School and earned a Bachelor of Science degree in chemistry from Indiana University. He earned his Master's degree from Georgetown University and Juris Doctor from the Robert H. McKinney School of Law at Indiana University – Purdue University Indianapolis.

== Career ==
In 1996, Weinzapfel ran for the United States House of Representatives in the 8th District of Indiana. He was defeated in a close race by one-term incumbent John Hostettler after narrowly defeating (by a margin of 1%) State Representative Rick McConnell of Princeton, Indiana. In the primary, Weinzapfel carried the more liberal parts of Monroe and Vanderburgh Counties, while McConnell won more conservative parts of the 8th District.

Weinzapfel went on to serve five years in the Indiana House of Representatives for District 76. In this capacity he served as the Chairman of the Courts and Criminal Code Committee, the Environmental Affairs Committee and the Environmental Quality Service Council.

In 2000, he served as attorney for Bowers Harrison LLP. Weinzapfel also served on the Financial Institutions, the Judiciary, and the Public Health committees. His accomplishments include helping to found the Southwestern Indiana Regional Development Commission. He served as the first president of the group. The commission is representative of Gibson, Posey, Vanderburgh, and Warrick counties in order to promote economic development and improve the quality of life in southern Indiana.

=== Mayor of Evansville ===
His first term as Evansville mayor began on January 1, 2004.

In the 2008 presidential campaign, he endorsed Barack Obama.

During his last year as mayor, he oversaw an implementation of an overhaul of the city's accounting information system. An audit of his last year as mayor revealed significant problems with that implementation and the auditors issued a Disclaimer of Opinion.

Due to his popularity in a politically competitive part of the state, there was some speculation of Weinzapfel running for governor in 2008 against incumbent Mitch Daniels and in 2012 when it was an open seat. He did not, however, enter either race. Weinzapfel joined Faegre Baker Daniels LLP as attorney in 2012 and resigned in 2014. There was also speculation that he may run for governor again in 2016; however, he did not.

In 2014, Weinzapfel was selected as chancellor of Ivy Tech Community College Southwest as part of the college's organizational restructure. He served in that position through November 2019, when he left to join the Evansville law firm, Jones Wallace LLC.

=== 2020 Indiana Attorney General election ===
On December 10, 2019, Weinzapfel announced his intention to run for Indiana Attorney General in the 2020 election against incumbent Republican Curtis Hill. On June 13, 2020, during the virtual state convention, delegates formally nominated Weinzapfel to be the Democratic nominee for attorney general, defeating his only primary opponent, state senator Karen Tallian. The final vote tally was 1,057 votes to Weinzapfel and 1,009 votes to Tallian. Weinzapfel went on to lose the general election to former Congressman Todd Rokita (who had unseated Hill at the Republican convention) by a wide margin, though he received a greater percentage of the vote than either Democratic presidential candidate Joe Biden or Democratic gubernatorial candidate Woody Myers.

== Personal life ==
Weinzapfel resides in Evansville, Indiana. He is married to Patricia Weinzapfel and they have three children. Patricia is a former reporter for WFIE Channel 14 Evansville and currently serves as the Executive Director of Family Engagement/Community Schools for the Evansville Vanderburgh School Corporation.

== Electoral history ==
=== 1996 ===
Indiana's 8th congressional district election, 1996
| Party | Candidate | Votes | % |
|---|---|---|---|
| Republican | John Hostettler (incumbent) | 109,860 | 50.0 |
| Democratic | Jonathan Weinzapfel | 106,201 | 48.3 |
| Libertarian | Paul Hager | 3,803 | 1.7 |
| Total votes | | 219,864 | 100.0 |
| Republican hold | | | |

=== 2003 ===
2003 Evansville mayoral election
| Party | Candidate | Votes | % |
|---|---|---|---|
| Democratic | Jonathan Weinzapfel | 19,089 | 63.6 |
| Republican | Russell G. Lloyd Jr. (incumbent) | 10,063 | 33.5 |
| Independent | Jack Groshans Jr. | 874 | 2.9 |
| Total votes | | 30,026 | 100.0 |
| Democratic gain from Republican | | | |

=== 2007 ===
2007 Evansville mayoral election
| Party | Candidate | Votes | % |
|---|---|---|---|
| Democratic | Jonathan Weinzapfel (incumbent) | 13,097 | 85.2 |
| Republican | David J. Nixon | 2,268 | 14.8 |
| Total votes | | 15,365 | 100.0 |
| Democratic hold | | | |

=== 2020 ===
Democratic convention results
| Party | Candidate | Votes | % |
|---|---|---|---|
| Democratic | Jonathan Weinzapfel | 1,057 | 51.2 |
| Democratic | Karen Tallian | 1,009 | 48.8 |
| Total votes | | 2,066 | 100.0 |

Indiana Attorney General election, 2020
| Party | Candidate | Votes | % |
|---|---|---|---|
| Republican | Todd Rokita | 1,721,998 | 58.3 |
| Democratic | Jonathan Weinzapfel | 1,229,626 | 41.7 |
| Total votes | | 2,951,624 | 100.0 |

Party political offices
| Preceded by Lorenzo Arredondo | Democratic nominee for Indiana Attorney General; 2020 | Most recent |
