= Ivy Tech Community College of Indiana =

Community college system in the US state of Indiana

Ivy Tech Community College
- Ivy Tech Community College logo
- Former names: Indiana Vocational Technical College (1963–1995); Ivy Tech State College (1995–2005)
- Motto: Our Communities. Your College.
- Type: Public community college
- Established: 1963; 63 years ago
- President: Martin Pollio
- Students: 110,710 (fall 2024)
- Location: Multiple locations, Indiana, United States
- Website: www.ivytech.edu

Ivy Tech Community College (Ivy Tech) is a public community college system in the U.S. state of Indiana. It is the state's public community college system, and it has more than 41 locations. It enrolled 110,710 students in fall 2024. It is accredited by the Higher Learning Commission.

== History ==
Ivy Tech was founded in 1963 as Indiana's Vocational Technical College in order to provide technical and vocational education for various industries. It was rechartered as a system of vocational technical schools in 2005. The name "Ivy Tech" derives from an initialism (I.V. Tech) of the school's original name. The name was officially changed to Ivy Tech State College in 1995.

In 1999, Ivy Tech entered into a partnership with Vincennes University to form the Community College of Indiana. The partnership ended in 2005 and Ivy Tech was re-chartered as a system of community colleges and renamed Ivy Tech Community College of Indiana. In 2008, the Indiana University system agreed to shift most of its associate (2-year) degrees to the Ivy Tech Community College System.

In 2019, Ivy Tech entered into a partnership with the University of Virginia which will allow Ivy Tech undergraduates to complete their four-year degrees online at that university.

== Academics ==
The college offers more than 70 programs across its campuses and instructional sites, with programs divided across nine different schools:

- School of Business, Logistics and Supply Chain
- School of Public Affairs and Social Services
- School of Information Technology
- School of Arts, Sciences and Education
- School of Health Sciences
- School of Nursing
- School of Advanced Manufacturing, Engineering and Applied Science
- Garatoni School of Entrepreneurship and Innovation
- School of Culinary Arts & Hospitality Management

== Campuses ==
Location of Ivy Tech campuses. Black markers indicate full-service campuses. Red markers indicate satellite campuses.

As of 2024
Campus name	City
Indianapolis Campus	Indianapolis
Plainfield Campus	Plainfield
Lawrence Campus	Lawrence
Lake County Campus - East Chicago	East Chicago
Lake County Campus - Gary	Gary
Lake County Campus - Crown Point	Crown Point
Valparaiso Campus - Michigan City Site	Michigan City
Valparaiso Campus - LaPorte Site	LaPorte
Valparaiso Campus	Valparaiso
South Bend/Elkhart - South Bend	South Bend
South Bend/Elkhart - Elkhart	Goshen
Warsaw Site	Warsaw
North Campus	Fort Wayne
Coliseum Campus	Fort Wayne
Rochester Site	Rochester
White County Instructional Center	Monticello
Logansport Site	Logansport
Peru Instructional Site	Peru
Kokomo Campus	Kokomo
Marion Campus	Marion
Lafayette Campus	Lafayette
Frankfort Instructional Center	Frankfort
Hamilton County Campus	Noblesville
Anderson Campus	Anderson
Muncie Campus	Muncie
Crawfordsville Satellite Location	Crawfordsville
Parke County Learning Center	Rockville
Greencastle Site	Greencastle
Shelbyville Site	Shelbyville
Terre Haute Campus	Terre Haute
Ivy Tech Community College Cooperative	Linton
Bloomington Campus	Bloomington
Columbus Campus	Columbus
Greensburg Community Learning Center	Greensburg
Batesville Site	Batesville
Lawrenceburg Campus - Lakefront	Lawrenceburg
Lawrenceburg Campus - Riverfront	Lawrenceburg
Jackson County Learning Center	Seymour
North Vernon Education & Training Center	North Vernon
Madison Campus	Madison
Mid-America Science Park	Scottsburg
Sellersburg Campus	Sellersburg
Princeton Instructional Site	Princeton
Evansville Campus	Evansville
Tell City Instructional Site	Tell City
