= List of people from Evansville, Indiana =

This is a list of people from Evansville, Indiana. This list includes people who were born in Evansville or lived in or around the city for a period of time.

== Government, law and activism ==
- Bess Abell, presidential aide and White House social secretary
- Anne S. Andrew, environmental attorney and United States Ambassador to Costa Rica
- Albion Fellows Bacon, reformer and writer
- Conrad Baker, 15th governor of Indiana (1867–1873) and 15th lieutenant governor (1861–1867)
- Allen Buchanan, officer in the United States Navy and a Medal of Honor recipient for his role in the United States occupation of Veracruz
- George Washington Buckner, physician, U.S. minister to Liberia
- Larry Bucshon, U.S. representative (2011–2025)
- John B. Conaway, retired United States Air Force officer, chief of the National Guard Bureau 1990–1993
- Suzanne Crouch, former lieutenant governor of Indiana and former Indiana state auditor
- Roger O. DeBruler, justice of the Indiana Supreme Court (1968–1996)
- Charles Denby Jr., U.S. diplomat in China and later in Vienna, Austria
- Charles Harvey Denby, U.S. Union officer in the Civil War; diplomat
- Edwin C. Denby, secretary of the Navy (1921–1924) and notable figure in the Teapot Dome scandal
- Winfield K. Denton, U.S. representative (1949–1953, 1955–1966)
- Brad Ellsworth, U.S. representative (2007–2011), 2010 Democratic nominee for U.S. Senate
- John H. Foster, U.S. representative (1905–1909)
- John W. Foster, U.S. secretary of state (1892–1893)
- James S. Harlan, lawyer and commerce specialist
- John Hostettler, U.S. representative (1995–2007)
- Henry S. Johnston, 7th governor of Oklahoma
- Joseph Lane, general, first governor of Oregon Territory, one of Oregon's first two U.S. senators, and 1860 candidate for vice president on the Democratic Party ticket
- Robert D. Orr, 45th governor of Indiana (1981–1989)
- Gary R. Pfingston, 10th chief master sergeant of the Air Force (1990–1994)
- Randall Shepard, chief justice of the Indiana Supreme Court
- Sallie Wyatt Stewart, former president of the National Association of Colored Women
- Barbara Underwood, attorney general of New York

== Sports and sports-related ==
- Marty Amsler, NFL defensive end
- Chic Anderson, sportscaster
- Aaron Barrett, MLB pitcher
- Alan Benes, MLB pitcher
- Andy Benes, MLB pitcher, member of US Olympic team, #1 draft pick
- Sean Bennett, NFL player, New York Giants
- McKinley Brewer, Negro League baseball player
- Bob Buck, sportscaster and sports director for WIKY AM/FM radio
- Drew Butera, MLB catcher
- Scott Cannon, soccer player
- Ray Cariens, racing driver
- Jamey Carroll, MLB infielder
- Rudy Charles, WWE & former Total Nonstop Action Wrestling referee
- Calbert Cheaney, Harrison High School, Indiana and NBA player
- DeLisa Chinn-Tyler, softball outfielder
- Deke Cooper, North High School, University of Notre Dame, NFL player
- Jerry Dale, MLB umpire
- Phelps Darby, coach of Indiana Hoosiers men's basketball team
- Luke Drone, NFL and AF2 player
- Todd Duffee, UFC fighter, actor
- Jerad Eickhoff, MLB pitcher for Philadelphia Phillies
- Bob Ford, North High School, Purdue basketball player, sportscaster
- Bob Griese, Rex Mundi High School, Purdue and NFL quarterback, All-Pro, Hall of Famer, Super Bowl champion, sportscaster
- Harley Grossman, MLB pitcher
- Bob Hamilton, professional golfer, winner of 1944 PGA Championship
- Kevin Hardy, Harrison High School, University of Illinois, NFL linebacker
- Lilly King, swimmer, gold medalist at 2016 Summer Olympics
- Michael Klueh, swimmer, world champion
- Luke Kruytbosch, sportscaster
- Kyle Kuric, Memorial High School, University of Louisville basketball player, professional basketball player in Spain
- Khristian Lander, Reitz High School, Indiana University and Western Kentucky University basketball player
- Don Mattingly, MLB player for New York Yankees, former manager of Los Angeles Dodgers and Miami Marlins
- Walter McCarty, NBA player, assistant coach for Indiana Pacers and Boston Celtics, former head coach for University of Evansville
- Arad McCutchan, basketball coach
- Dorothy Montgomery, All-American Girls Professional Baseball League player; cytologist at Welborn Clinic
- Jerry Nemer (1912–1980), basketball player and attorney
- Ray Newman, MLB player for Chicago Cubs and Milwaukee Brewers
- Jeff Overton, professional golfer
- Tubby Rohsenberger, NFL player
- Scott Rolen, MLB Hall of Fame third baseman
- Vince Russo, former WWE and Total Nonstop Action Wrestling writer; podcaster for Podcast One
- Dave Schellhase, basketball player, Purdue University
- Dru Smith, Reitz High School, NBA player
- Paul Splittorff, MLB pitcher, Kansas City Royals
- Larry Stallings, NFL linebacker, St Louis Cardinals
- Scott Studwell, NFL player, Minnesota Vikings

== Performing and visual arts ==
=== Actors, actresses and directors ===
- Tom Armstrong, cartoonist creator of Marvin
- Anne Barton, stage, film and television actress
- Billie Bennett, silent-film actress
- Budd Boetticher, film director
- Avery Brooks, actor, known for Star Trek: Deep Space Nine and Spenser: For Hire
- Joe Cook, actor, entertainer, and comedian
- Louise Dresser, Academy Award-nominated actress
- David Emge, actor, known for Dawn of the Dead
- Ron Glass, actor, known for Barney Miller and Firefly
- Phil Goss, actor and TV personality in Poland, voice-over professional for MTV and VH1 in Europe
- Rami Malek, actor, known for Bohemian Rhapsody, attended University of Evansville
- Michael Michele, actress, best known for ER
- Marilyn Miller, singer and dancer of 1920s and 1930s
- Dylan Minnette, actor, known for his roles in 13 Reasons Why, Alexander and the Terrible, Horrible, No Good, Very Bad Day and Goosebumps
- Roger Mobley, child actor of 1960s, later a Christian pastor in Texas
- Venus Raj, actress, model, beauty queen crowned Miss Indiana Teen USA 2006, Miss Indiana USA 2009, Binibining Pilipinas Universe 2010, and 4th runner-up at the Miss Universe 2010
- Jama Williamson, actress, known for playing Principal Mullins in the Nickelodeon series School of Rock and Wendy Haverford in Parks and Recreation

=== Music ===
- Kyle Burns, musician, member of Forever the Sickest Kids
- Sid Catlett, musician, jazz drummer
- John Cowan, singer, bassist John Cowan Band
- Neal Doughty, keyboard player, REO Speedwagon's only remaining founding member
- Jace Everett, country music singer
- Richard Faith, composer, concert pianist, professor of piano, and a published composer of piano pedagogy literature, orchestral and chamber works, opera and most prolifically, song
- Josh Gard, electronic music producer, DJ
- Ernie Haase, Southern gospel tenor vocalist for the Cathedral Quartet and Ernie Haase & Signature Sound
- Joe Hinton, R&B singer; biggest hit "Funny", 1964
- Philip Martin Lawrence II, songwriter, record producer, entrepreneur, and voice actor; best known for his work with The Smeezingtons and teaming with Bruno Mars
- Mock Orange, indie-rock band
- Noncompliant, DJ and record producer
- Dax Riggs, musician
- Fred Rose, musician, Hall of Fame songwriter and music publishing executive
- Ryan Seaton, gospel solo artist formerly of Ernie Haase & Signature Sound (2003–2009)
- Timmy Thomas, singer-songwriter, musician, record producer
- Andy Timmons, guitarist, musical director, and solo artist
- Geno Washington, soul singer

=== Media and artists ===
- Martha Susan Baker, painter, muralist and teacher
- Bruce Blackburn, graphic designer, designer of the NASA logotype
- Gary Hugh Brown, artist, painter, draftsman, and professor emeritus of art at the University of California, Santa Barbara
- Mark Cooper, multimedia artist
- Halston, graduated from Benjamin Bosse High School in 1950, fashion designer
- David Horsey, cartoonist for Los Angeles Times
- Edward McKnight Kauffer, artist and graphic designer, grew up in Evansville
- Barbara Kinney, photojournalist and White House photographer during Clinton administration
- Karl Kae Knecht, cartoonist for Evansville Courier
- William Snyder, four-time Pulitzer Prize-winning photographer
- Casey Stegall, national correspondent for Fox News Channel
- Aaron Tanner, graphic designer and author
- Ansel E. Wallace, photographer and film correspondent for the International News Service in World War I
- Marcia Yockey, impressionist painter, meteorologist
- Louise Zaring, impressionist painter, noted for her vivid use of color

=== Authors, producers, playwrights, writers, and poets ===
- Marilyn Durham, author of The Man Who Loved Cat Dancing
- Laurence Gross, playwright
- Bettiola Heloise Fortson, poet and author
- Annie Fellows Johnston, author of The Little Colonel series
- Edward J. Meeman, journalist and environmental crusader, born in Evansville in 1889
- Molly Newman, playwright and television producer
- Paul Osborn, playwright, screenwriter of East of Eden
- Steven Sater, Broadway lyricist, playwright and poet
- Winifred Sackville Stoner Jr., prolific child author and poet
- Matt Williams, producer of The Cosby Show, Home Improvement, and Roseanne

== Academics ==
- Margaret K. Butler, mathematician
- James C. Coomer, political scientist and emeritus professor of Political Science at Mercer University, and its former senior vice president for Academic Affairs
- Elbert Frank Cox, mathematician
- Linda Donley-Reid, born in Evansville, Indiana, graduated from Evansville Central High School in 1963, museum curator, archaeologist and clinical psychologist
- Stephen A. Fulling, mathematician and mathematical physicist, specializing in the mathematics of quantum theory, general relativity, and the spectral and asymptotic theory of differential operators
- Thomas K. Gaisser, particle physicist, cosmic ray researcher, and a pioneer of astroparticle physics
- Raymond Geuss, philosopher and university professor
- Clark Kimberling, mathematician
- Paul Musgrave, professor and expert in American foreign policy matters
- John Roger Tooley, engineer and former dean of college of engineering at University of Evansville
- Henry Babcock Veatch, philosopher and writer
- Talitha Washington, mathematician
- John D. Wiley, educator
- Lester M. Wolfson, founding chancellor of Indiana University South Bend

== Business ==
- E. S. Babcock, industrialist, tycoon, businessman, and entrepreneur; founder of the Hotel del Coronado
- Chuck Bundrant, billionaire businessman and the co-founder, chairman, and majority owner of Trident Seafoods
- Wallace A. Gaines, businessman, funeral home director
- Charles T. Hinde, businessman, riverboat captain, and original investor of the Hotel del Coronado
- Mary Fendrich Hulman, wife of industrialist Tony Hulman and matriarch of the Hulman-George family
- Edward Mead Johnson, businessman, co-founder of Johnson & Johnson, and founder of Mead Johnson & Co.
- Aaron Patzer, entrepreneur and founder of Mint.com, a personal financial management service
- Francis Joseph Reitz, banker, civic leader, and philanthropist
- John Augustus Reitz, lumber magnate, civic leader, and philanthropist
- Ray Ryan, gambler, oilman, promoter, developer
- Ruth Siems, Stove Top Stuffing creator
- Harry J. Sonneborn, first president and CEO of McDonald's (played by actor B.J. Novak in the film The Founder)
- Cari Tuna, philanthropist

== Religion ==
- Anthony Deydier, French priest, missionary and teacher sent to Evansville in 1837
- Diane Drufenbrock, attended Reitz Memorial High School, religious sister as a member of the Catholic School Sisters of St. Francis
- Mary Simpson, one of the first women ordained a priest by the American Episcopal Church
- John Roach Straton, minister
- Paul E. Waldschmidt, Roman Catholic bishop
- Mike Warnke, Christian comedian, discredited "expert" on Satanism

== Others ==
- Pearl Berg, supercentenarian
