= McCutchanville, Indiana =

- Unincorporated community

- Location within Indiana Location within the United States
- Coordinates: 38°03′51″N 87°31′28″W
- Country: United States
- State: Indiana
- County: Vanderburgh
- Township: Center
- Established: 1845
- Founder: Scottish/ Irish immigrants
- Named for: Samuel McCutchan
- Elevation: 499 ft (152 m)
- Time zone: UTC-6 (Central (CST))
  - Summer (DST): UTC-5 (CDT)
- ZIP code: 47725
- Area codes: 812, 930
- GNIS feature ID: 438847

McCutchanville is an unincorporated community in Center Township, Vanderburgh County, in the U.S. state of Indiana. McCutchanville was established in 1845 and is named for Samuel McCutchan, a Scottish/Irish immigrant who was the first postmaster for the area.

== History ==
McCutchanville was first settled by Scottish and Irish immigrants in the early 19th century. In 1845, Samuel McCutchan became the Post Master of the community's first post office. This led to the community being called McCutchanville. The post office operated from 1850 to 1906.

McCutchanville was also the childhood home to Annie Fellows Johnston, American author of The Little Colonel series. Annie died on October 5, 1931, and is buried at Oak Hill Cemetery in Evansville, Indiana.

== School districts ==
This area, originally part of the Vanderburgh County School Corporation, was served beginning in the mid-1800s by Center Township School #3 (McCutchanville School) on Old Petersburg Rd. In 1918, #7 (Hooker School) and #8 (Kansas School) were closed and consolidated into McCutchanville School, causing students living some distance east and south of McCutchanville to attend. In 1944, a local resident remembered walking six miles each way as a child between McCutchanville School and his home on what is now Hitch-Peters Rd. From 1948 to 1957, students in the district attended Lynch School for grades 1–2 and McCutchanville School for grades 3–8, adding students from the old Lynch School area. Between the growth of subdivisions and the Baby Boom, there was a need for a new school. The new Oak Hill School was opened in 1957 for grades 1 to 5, with grades 6 to 8 attending McCutchanville School. The Oak Hill School 1966 upper grades addition opened the school to all students in grades K to 8, and McCutchanville School was closed.

From 1966 to 1984, all students north of Lynch Road and west of the Vanderburgh/Warrick county line, in an area extending halfway into McCutchanville to the north, attended Oak Hill Elementary School (K-8) and North High School. With the 1984 EVSC middle school redistricting plan, the entire McCutchanville area (along with areas south to St. George Rd, attended Scott Elementary School, Oak Hill Middle School, and North High School. In 2011, another redistricting split Scott School's students again, with the southern part of the district again attending Oak Hill School as it was renovated into an elementary school once again.

In August 2018, the Evansville Vanderburgh School Corporation (EVSC) built a new elementary school near McCutchanville Park. This returned a McCutchanville School to the community for the first time in 50 years. Students from Scott School and Oak Hill School were again put through another redistricting. The current boundaries of the new McCutchanville School are Boonville New Harmony Road to the north, Warrick County line to the east, and US 41 from the west and US 57 to the south. Students for the new school picked the "Mustangs" as their mascot, and incorporated the school colors after colors used by teams at the nearby McCutchanville Park sports fields.

== Notable residents ==
- Albion Fellows Bacon – reformer and writer
- Annie Fellows Johnston – author
