= The Little Colonel =

The Little Colonel may refer to

- The Little Colonel, book series by Annie Fellows Johnston.
- The Little Colonel (1935 film), American film
- The Little Colonel (1960 film), Spanish film
