= Kate Matthews =

American photographer

- Born: August 13, 1870; New Albany, Indiana
- Died: July 5, 1956 (aged 85)
- Known for: Photography

Kate Seston Matthews (August 13, 1870 – July 5, 1956) was an American photographer who depicted tableaux vivants and scenes of everyday life in her community of Pewee Valley, Kentucky, at the turn of the 20th century.

== Early life ==
Kate Seston Matthews was born in New Albany, Indiana, on August 13, 1870. After a childhood illness weakened one of her eyes and left her very frail, Lucien G. and Charlotta Anne Clark Matthews arranged for their youngest daughter to be educated at home while her seven siblings attended school. Sometime between 1880 and 1895, the Matthews family moved to Oldham County, Kentucky, where they eventually bought a fourteen-room Victorian house and roughly twelve acres on Ashwood Avenue in Pewee Valley. Matthews lived in the family home known as Clovercroft until she died on July 5, 1956.

== Photographs ==
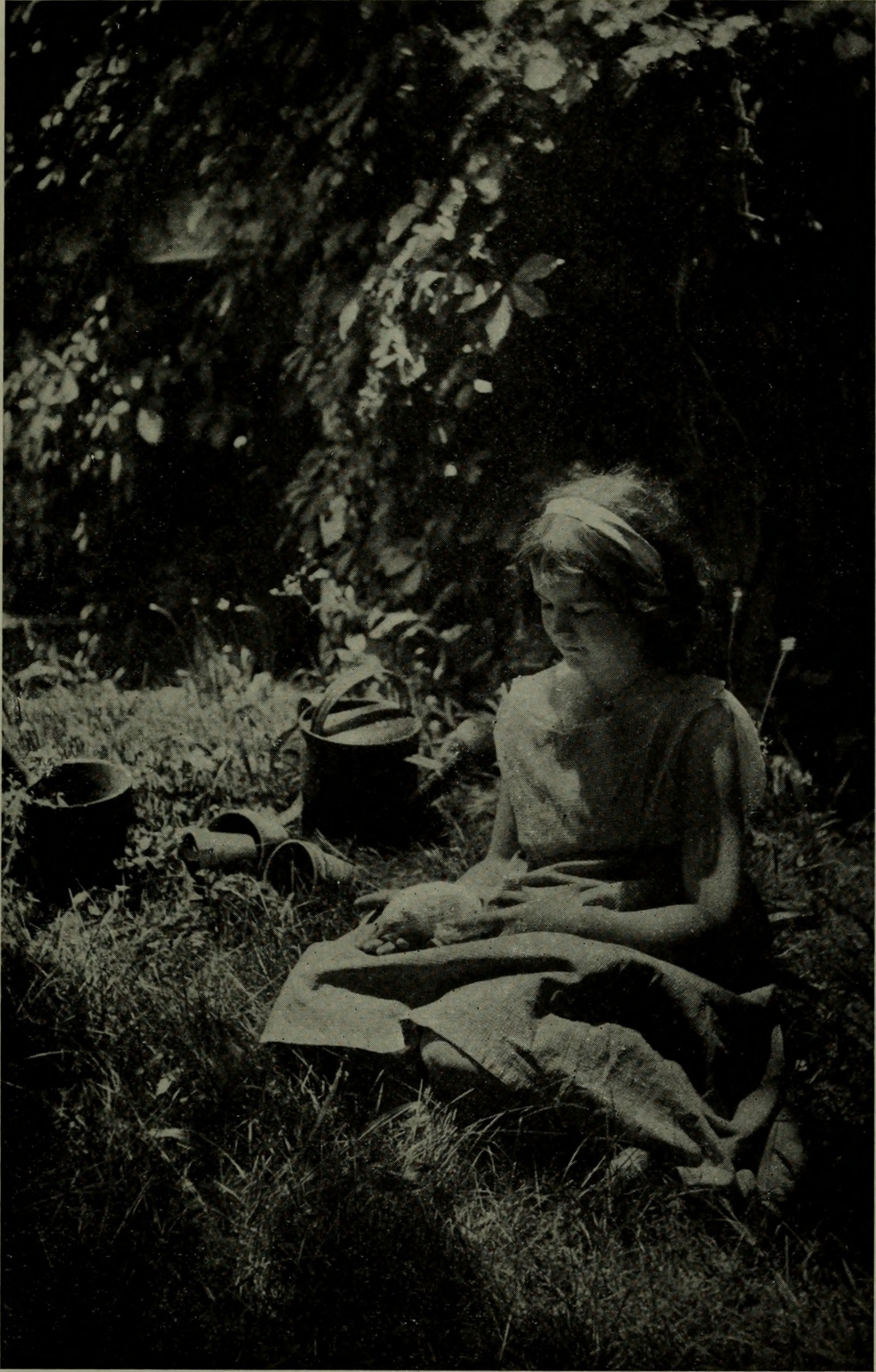
"The Dead Pigeon", published in The American annual of photography (1914)

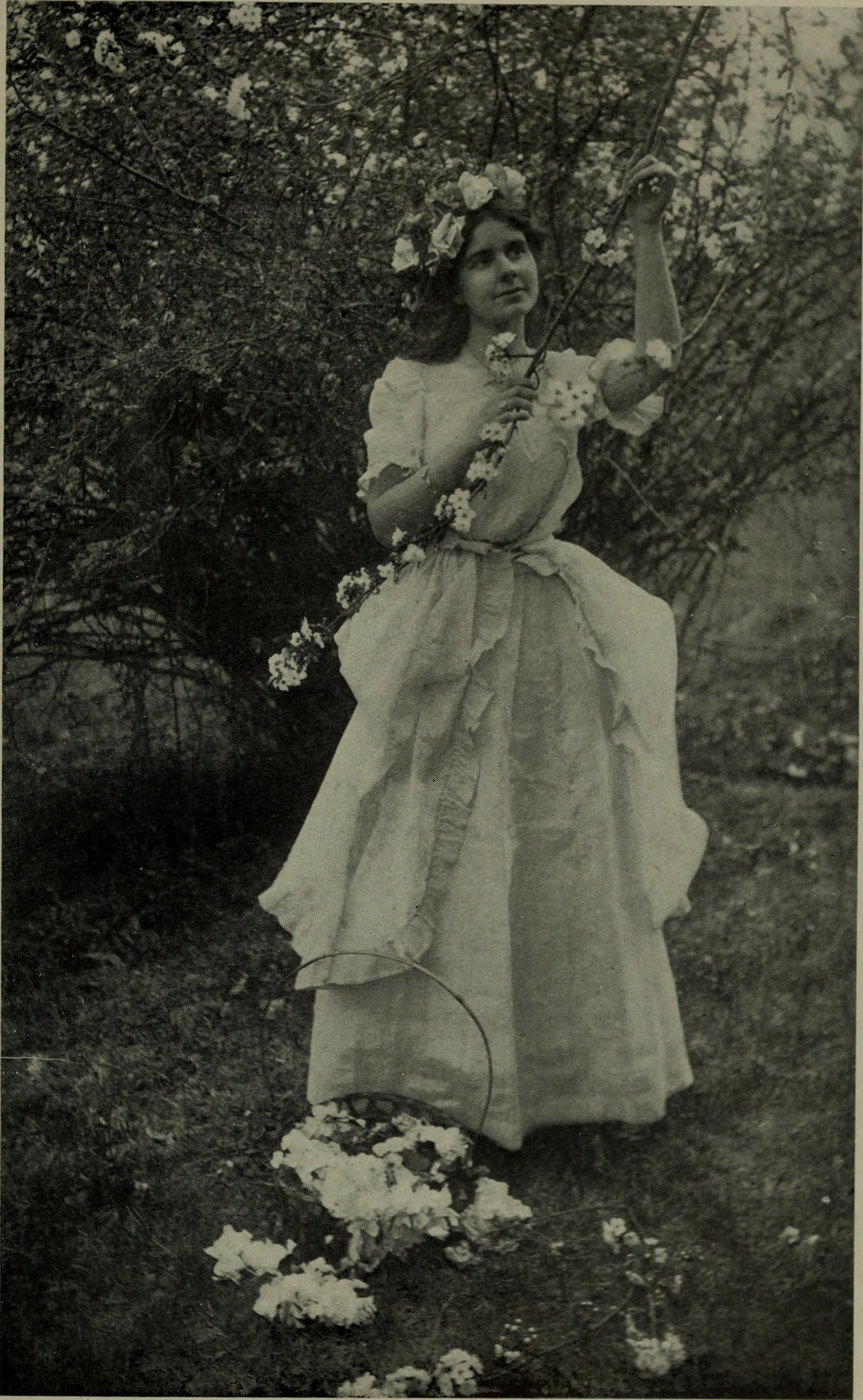
"May Day", published in The American Annual of Photography (1919)

Kate Matthews was introduced to photography by the husband of her oldest sister, Lillian, while she was spending a summer with the couple and their children in Vermont. Charles Barrows Fletcher, a camera enthusiast, noticed that the usually shy and quiet teenager was curious about all aspects of photography. He mentioned Kate's interest in a letter to her father and suggested that it would be nice if she had her own camera. On his next business trip to New York, Lucien Matthews bought his youngest daughter the finest professional camera he could find.

Despite numerous technological advancements in photography over the next several decades, Matthews used that big bellows-style camera with glass plate negatives, black hood, and tripod for the rest of her life. She experimented with cameras that captured snapshots via automatic shutters, but she considered her photography an art and preferred to control light exposure with a lens cap. She also controlled every step of the development process in her own darkroom. She hand-tinted some photographs and frequently gave friends and family signed prints or sent them postcards made from prints.

Matthews' devotion to photography was considered somewhat eccentric in the small, traditional community of Pewee Valley. She would load the large camera, tripod, and costumes into her pony cart along with relatives, neighbors, or visiting children she persuaded to serve as models. Then she would drive to preselected locations where they recreated scenes from fairy tales and story books. Matthews' niece, Lillian Fletcher Brackett, described her aunt as an artist who was extremely focused and somewhat "dreamy" when her "genius was burning." When a writer from the Louisville Courier-Journal asked Matthews about her technique, she said "I am very conscious of light... I watch it from day to day and when it is where I need it, I use it."

In an era when few women ventured into photography, Matthews won prizes at the Kentucky State Fair, in contests in Chicago, Columbus, and Pittsburgh, and in other regional and national competitions. She had photographs published in The American Annual of Photography seventeen times between 1896 and 1923. Her photos also ran in The Youth's Companion, Cosmopolitan, Vogue, Ladies' Home Journal, Good Housekeeping, Illustrated American, The Forward, The Brown Book of Boston and Burr McIntosh Monthly. In 1895, Southern Magazine featured Matthews along with sculptor Enid Yandell, in an article celebrating young women artists. Her photographs were occasionally used in advertising for products such Jersey Cream Toilet Soap and Wolf Pen Mill flour in Kentucky.

Kate Matthews' most recognized photographs are those illustrating The Little Colonel series of books written by her friend and neighbor, Annie Fellows Johnston. The series, about a fictional character named Lloyd Sherman living in Lloydsboro Valley, is based at least in part on real people and places in Pewee Valley, Kentucky. Matthews herself was portrayed as the character Miss Katharine Marks, and she photographed many of the other real-life characters acting as their counterparts. A number of these pictures were published in books and on postcards by L.C. Page & Company.

Matthews seldom ventured far from home, but she found strength and support through her connections with a larger world. She read the best journals and her work reveals knowledge of trends and artistic movements both in the United States and abroad. Unfortunately her papers and most of her prints and negatives were lost in a fire shortly after her death, but she is known to have corresponded with editors of a number of photography journals and to have sought guidance from recognized leaders in the field, including Alfred Stieglitz and Edward Steichen.

While many of her images may be classified as "tableaux vivants" inspired by literature and popular writings of the time, Matthews also photographed real people, architecture, and landscape of Pewee Valley. Her work has been described as sentimental, charming, late Victorian, and an idealistic representation of "the gentle, romantic mood of life in the aristocratic, southern town of Pewee Valley, Kentucky." Critics, however, note that her subjects are seldom smiling and say she appeared to be more interested in costumes, props, and staging than the emotions or humanity of the people she depicted.

Matthews' photographs have been exhibited at the University of Louisville (1956, 1988, and 2007–2008), the Hunt–Morgan House (1956), the Whitney Museum of American Art (1974–1975), the San Francisco Museum of Modern Art (1975), the Lockwood–Mathews Mansion of Norwalk, Connecticut (1987), and Atlanta's High Museum of Art (1996), among other places. Her works are also in permanent collections at the Museum of Modern Art in London, the International Museum of Photography at the George Eastman House in Rochester, and Princeton University. The largest collection of Kate Matthews prints and negatives is housed in the Photographic Archives in Archives and Special Collections at the University of Louisville.

== General references ==
- Brackett, Lillian Fletcher. "A Recollection of Kate Matthews, 1870-1956." Presented to the Oldham County Historical Society (May 31, 1974).
- Campbell, Norma Prendergast. "Kate Matthews, Photographer." Kentucky Review, 1 (Spring 1980): 11–28.
- Cornett, Susanna. "Picturing Times Gone By." The Louisville Courier-Journal Neighborhoods (February 24, 1988): 1–3.
- Courteau, Connie. "As the Years Pass By She Stays in Focus." The Courier-Journal Magazine (September 19, 1954): 53–57.
- Johnston, Annie Fellows. The Land of the Little Colonel: Reminiscence and Autobiography, L. C. Page & Co., Boston, 1929.
- "Kate Matthews and the Little Colonel." Louisville, Ky.: Lithocraft, 1963.
- Peterson, Christian A. Index to the American Annual of Photography, Christian A. Peterson, Minneapolis, 1996.
- "Remembrance of Things Past." The Louisville Times (January 8, 1963): B1.
