= EVSC =

EVSC may refer to:

- Eurovision Song Contest, an annual European television competition
- Evansville Vanderburgh School Corporation, a school district in southern Indiana
