= Albion Fellows Bacon =

American reformer and writer (1865–1933)

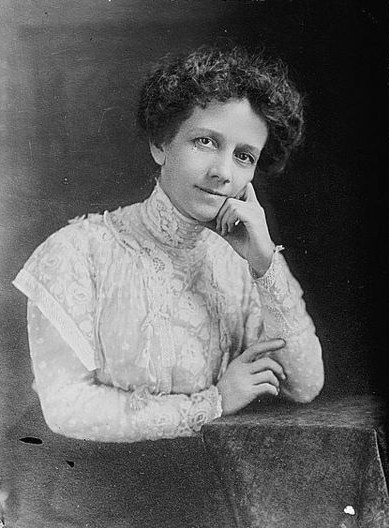
- Bacon circa 1915–1920
- Born: Albion Fellows; October 20, 1865; Evansville, Indiana, US
- Died: December 10, 1933 (aged 68); Evansville, Indiana, US
- Burial place: Oak Hill Cemetery (Evansville, Indiana)
- Known for: Progressive Era social reforms
- Notable work: Beauty for Ashes
- Movement: Housing reform
- Spouse: Hilary Bacon
- Children: 4
- Relatives: Annie Fellows Johnston

Albion Fellows Bacon (April 8, 1865 – December 10, 1933) was an American social reformer and writer from Evansville, Indiana. As Indiana's foremost "municipal housekeeper," a Progressive Era term for women who applied their domestic skills to social problems plaguing their communities, Bacon had a range of reform interests. She is best remembered for her efforts to improve housing standards and her work on tenement reform. A recognized expert in the field of housing reform, Bacon was persistent in her efforts to secure passage of legislative proposals for the issue, which resulted in passage of housing legislation in Indiana in 1909, 1913, and 1917. Bacon earned a national reputation as a social reformer that resulted in her appointment to the President's Conference on Home Building and Home Ownership and served on its standards and objectives committee.

Bacon was an author of several books, pamphlets, and journal articles on tenement reform, among other issues, and wrote published books of devotional materials, poetry, and children's stories. She also worked to improve the lives of Indiana's youth through her involvement in several organizations, including leadership roles in the Indiana Child Welfare Association; the Child Welfare Committee, a part of the Women's Section of the Indiana State Council of Defense; the Indiana Conference of Charities and Corrections, and the Juvenile Advisory Commission of Indiana's Probation Department. Bacon remained active in city planning efforts, especially in Evansville. Following her death, Evansville's newspapers called her the city's "best known and most loved woman."

== Early life and education ==
Albion Fellows was born on April 8, 1865, in Evansville, Indiana. She was the youngest daughter of Reverend Albion and Mary (Erskine) Fellows. Her father, a Methodist minister at Trinity, died a few weeks before her birth, Albion's mother returned to her hometown of McCutchanville, Indiana, where she established a home and raised Albion and her two older sisters. Albion later attributed her early life in a small, rural town as a motivation in her efforts to achieve urban reform.

As a child Albion liked to write poetry and dreamed of going to an art institute, but the family's finances prohibited her from continuing an education beyond high school.

"The Last Day," a poem that Albion wrote in her youth, describes her last day in elementary school at McCutchanville:
Our days at school are almost past,
And this, the brightest, is the last,
The last of all those hours so bright,
Illuminated with sweet wisdom's light.
But still the sun rolls on the same,
Its burning orb of living flame,
Though those who love its cheery light,
Are parted from each other's sight.
The brook still ripples o’er the stone,
Heedless of what Old Time has done,
Though those that wandered by its side,
Will soon be scattered far and wide,
While in the hearts of us alone,
Will live the thoughts of all that's gone.

After graduating from Evansville Central High School, then known as Evansville High School in 1883, Albion worked as a legal secretary and toured Europe with her older sister, Annie Fellows Johnston, who became a professional writer.

== Marriage and family ==
Albion married Hilary Bacon, owner of Woolworth's shop in Evansville, on October 11, 1888. The couple had four children: Margaret, born in 1889; Albion Mary, born in 1892; and twins Joy and Hilary, born in 1901. Over the next few years she settled into a middle-class domestic life with her husband and children in Evansville. Soon after the birth of her second daughter, Bacon became afflicted with an illness, at that time described as "nervous prostration" (possibly clinical depression), that lasted several years. The extended illness may have had an effect, if only perceived, on her creative life.

== Career ==
=== Housing reformer ===
At the turn of the century, Bacon was among many Americans who became concerned about the effects of industrialization and urbanization. She was especially interested in improving living conditions in Evansville, where she volunteered as a "friendly visitor" for local charities. Bacon helped organized a Flower Mission group, an Anti-Tuberculosis League, and a Working Girls' Association. As a member of the Monday Night Club, a group of influential citizens interested in charitable work, Bacon was especially active in the work of its housing committee.

Bacon, who believed that substandard housing was the main cause of social problems in American cities, attempted to have regulations on tenements added to Evansville's building codes, but was unsuccessful. The experience caused Bacon to change her approach by addressing the issue of housing reform at the state level of government. Her goal became passage of a statewide housing law, which she considered essential to achievement of long-term tenement reform.

In 1908 Bacon participated in roundtable discussions on tenement reform in Richmond, Virginia, where she met other activists interested in the issue. Upon her return to Evansville, she began correspondence with several prominent social reformers, such as Jacob Riis, author of How the Other Half Lives (1890), and Lawrence Veiller, author of New York's 1901 tenement law and an expert on the subject. During the summer she began drafting a proposed statewide tenement law for Indiana. Bacon sought support from other groups for her proposal and succeeded in getting the Indianapolis Commercial Club to sponsor the legislation. The Club agreed to sponsor the bill if Bacon agreed to attend sessions of the Indiana General Assembly to help secure its passage, which she did.

Best known for her efforts on behalf of tenement reform in Indiana, Bacon attended every session of the Indiana General Assembly from 1909 to 1917 to secure her goal of a statewide housing law. In addition to her own efforts, Bacon rallied others to support housing reform. As a result of her persistence, the state legislature passed housing reform laws in 1909, 1913, and 1917. During these years Bacon worked as an unpaid lobbyist to secure passage of housing bills in the Indiana legislature.

Bacon made her first appearance before the Indiana General Assembly on January 19, 1909, when she spoke before a joint meeting of the Indiana House and Senate health committees as a supporter of the proposed housing reform bill she drafted. Bacon spent the remainder of the year directing the campaign to secure passage of the bill. In 1909 the Indiana legislature passed an amended housing law based on Bacon's initial proposal; however, the effort fell short of Bacon's goal to achieve statewide housing reform. (The amendments weakened the bill's widespread effectiveness by restricting its application to multifamily housing in Evansville and Indianapolis.) Bacon made a second attempt for a statewide law in 1911. The bill, which Lawrence Veiller wrote, was narrowly defeated. Before making a third attempt, Bacon used her public speaking engagements on the lecture circuit between 1911 and 1913 to educate others on the issue and rally them to her cause. The Indiana Federation of Clubs, a statewide organization of women's clubs, became one of Bacon's allies and was especially active in housing issues. Bacon chaired the organization's housing committee and also helped organize the Indiana Housing Association.

In 1913 Bacon and her associates successfully pushed through a bill of statewide application. Passage of the housing law, which was nearly identical to the 1911 proposal that was defeated, was attributed to the lobbying efforts of Bacon and her supporters, as well as a political climate that favored social reforms. Bacon's autobiography, Beauty for Ashes (1914), documents her 1909, 1911, and 1913 campaigns for statewide housing reform. In 1917 Bacon reached a major milestone in her career as a housing reform activist with the unanimous passage of Indiana's statewide housing law. Sometimes called the "death trap" bill, it allowed for condemning unsafe and unsanitary dwellings.

=== Author ===
As part of Bacon's efforts to secure passage of legislative proposals for housing reform legislation, she authored several books, pamphlets, and journal articles on tenement reform and other social issues. In addition, she wrote religious tracts, pageant materials, poetry, and a book of children's stories.

== Later years ==
Although she had achieved her primary goal of attaining a statewide housing law in 1917, Bacon remained a social welfare activist and continued to work for housing reform throughout her life. Bacon's range of reform interests also included city planning and making improvements to the living conditions of Indiana's youth. In her later years Bacon continued her reform activities with housing associations and delivered lectures around the Midwest on housing and other social-welfare issues. Her reputation as a housing reformer also led to an appointment to the President's Conference on Home Building and Home Ownership. She served on its standards and objectives committee and made several trips to Washington, D.C. to attend meetings related to development of federal legislation and national housing standards. Bacon also made a committee presentation at the conference, which was held on December 3–5, 1931, in Washington, D.C.

Bacon's efforts on behalf of Indiana's youth involved several organizations. In 1917 she became chair of the Child Welfare Committee, a part of the Women's Section of the Indiana State Council of Defense. She continued to work on passage of child labor and school attendance laws and establishing a juvenile probation system. Bacon served as president of Indiana Conference of Charities and Corrections and the Juvenile Advisory Commission of Indiana's Probation Department, a group that oversaw efforts to assess physical and health of preschool children. She was also head of the executive committee of the Indiana Child Welfare Association.

Bacon remained active in city planning efforts, especially in Evansville. In 1921 she helped establish Evansville's City Plan Commission and served as either its president or vice president in the 1920s.

== Death and legacy ==
Bacon died of heart failure on December 10, 1933, at her home in Evansville. Her remains are interred at Evansville's Oak Hill Cemetery.

Following the passage of Indiana's statewide housing law in 1917, author Edith Wood identified Bacon, Jacob Riis, and Lawrence Veiller as the three "magnetic personalities" who were responsible for encouraging housing reform in the United States. Wood attributed Bacon's success in securing a statewide housing law in Indiana to her persistence. After her death, Evansville newspapers referred to Bacon as the city's "best known and most loved woman. " She is recognized as "a symbol of the housing reform movement as well as an expert in this field."

== Honors and tributes ==
Albion Flats, a block of apartments that were built in Evansville about 1910, is named as a tribute to Bacon.

Albion Fellows Bacon Center, located in Evansville and serving eleven counties in southern Indiana today, is named is named in her honor. The center was incorporated in December 1981. With funding provided by a grant through the CBGD, a home was purchased and doors opened on September 10, 1982. The small home boasted enough space for 27 residents with a total of six bedrooms and two bathrooms. By January 1989, the Board of Directors had decided to build a new facility with a Capital Funds Drive. The new facility opened in 1990 with the ability to home 36 residents. In 2022, the facility expanded and added more rooms and an office wing. The organization currently provides residential and non-residential services, two 24/7 crisis hotlines maintained by trained advocates, community outreach and training, primary abuse prevention, legal advocacy, as well as children's and crisis response programs. Albion Fellows Bacon Center currently serves the following counties: Vanderburgh, Posey, Warrick, Spencer, Perry, Dubois, Gibson, Pike, Orange, Crawford, and Harrison. Despite first serving women and children, Albion Center welcomes and serves all individuals regardless of gender, race, language, disability, sexual orientation, immigration status, or background and employs a trauma-informed, survivor centered model of services.

== Selected published works ==
=== Books ===
- Songs Ysame (1897), a collection of poetry (coauthored with her sister, Annie Fellows Johnston).
- What Bad Housing Means to the Community (1910)
- A Tale of the Tenements (1912)
- Beauty for Ashes (1914), her autobiography
- The Soldier's Book of Worship (1917)
- Consolation: A Spiritual Experience (1922)
- The Path to God (1928)
- The Charm String (1929), a children's book

=== Other ===
- "The Housing Problem in Indiana" (1908)
- "The Awakening of a State––Indiana" (1910)
- "The Divine Call: Follow Me" (1912)
- "Housing––Its Relation to Social Work" (1918)
- "Lincoln" (1925), a poem
