= John Reitz =

John Reitz may refer to:

- John Augustus Reitz, American entrepreneur, industrialist and philanthropist
- John T. Reitz, American re-recording mixer
