= FJ Reitz High School =

High school in Evansville, IN

Francis Joseph Reitz High School

Location
- 350 Dreier Boulevard; Evansville, Indiana 47712; United States; 37°58′24″N 87°36′21″W

Information
- Other names: Evansville Reitz High School; Reitz High School
- Type: Public
- Established: September 1918; 107 years ago
- School district: Evansville Vanderburgh School Corporation
- CEEB code: 150960
- Principal: Jeff Dierlam
- Teaching staff: 77.71 (FTE)
- Grades: 9-12
- Enrollment: 1,321 (2023-2024)
- Student to teacher ratio: 17.00
- Campus type: Urban
- Colors: Navy and Gray
- Athletics conference: Southern Indiana Athletic Conference
- Nickname: Panthers
- Rival: Mater Dei High School
- Newspaper: The Mirror
- Yearbook: Reflections
- Website: www.evscschools.com/reitz

Francis Joseph Reitz High School (FJ Reitz High School, FJ Reitz, or simply Reitz) is a public high school on the west side of Evansville, Indiana. It was founded in 1918 following a donation from local philanthropist and banker Francis Joseph Reitz, for whom the school is named. It is the second-oldest high school in the city after Evansville Central High School and is run by the Evansville Vanderburgh School Corporation.

It is known as Evansville Reitz by the Indiana High School Athletic Association to distinguish it from Reitz Memorial High School, also named in FJ Reitz's honor. Memorial is a private Roman Catholic school operated by the Diocese of Evansville.

== History ==
=== Early history and namesake ===
In the early 1900s, the only high school in the city was Evansville High School, which was located downtown. This was problematic for the city's west side residents, as it was too far away to be financially practical. The school board agreed to purchase land on the west side on Forest Hill, then also known as Coal Mine Hill and today known as Reitz Hill. However, economic issues stemming from World War I made the project impractical. Before the project was abandoned, local banker Francis Joseph Reitz generously agreed to fund the entire issue through the sale of bonds.

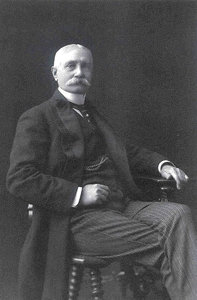
Francis Joseph Reitz c.1920s, the school's namesake.

The school after its completion.

=== Beginnings ===
The cornerstone was laid on November 3, 1917, with the ceremony being presided over by mayor Benjamin Bosse. The original two-story and basement building was opened in September 1918. Evansville High School was renamed Evansville Central to reflect the opening of the new school. Reitz graduated its first senior class in 1921. That same year, the 10,000-seat (now 12,000-seat) Reitz Football Stadium (locally known as the Reitz Bowl) was completed on the side of a natural slope next to the school.

=== Expansions ===
In 1926, the school was expanded for the first time, with a four-story classroom building and gymnasium being added in the style of the original building to its west end. In 1956, a new section containing many new specialty rooms was added which destroyed its original entrance, and in 1957, a five-story classroom wing and a larger gymnasium were added. Also in 1957, an auditorium was added that connected to the Reitz Bowl press box, creating a tunnel (known simply as "the tunnel" by students) where concessions are sold during home athletic events. In 1973, a greenhouse was added, as well as an electric scoreboard for the Reitz Bowl that was donated by the West Side Nut Club. In 1977, an automobile driving range was added off-campus at the nearby Barker Avenue Sports Complex to accommodate the Indiana Driver's Education Department; the driving range is now the practice lot for the school's marching band. In 1988, a fieldhouse was added along with weight training facilities. In 1998, another building (the "new building" as it is called by the students) was added to the school; it is connected to the old building via an elevated passageway known as "the link" that now serves as the school's main entrance. At the same time, the school received a $26 million renovation. In 2009, the football field was replaced with AstroTurf and dedicated the Herman Byers field, Reitz's head football coach from 1942 to 1962 who accumulated a 189–51–15 record and six state championships.

=== School colors ===
The school's original colors were purple and gold. They were changed to navy and gray in 1926 when the school's football jerseys were received in navy and gray. Following a student vote they become the official colors. It is often incorrectly assumed that the colors were given to Lincoln High School (an African-American school at the time, which was later merged into Bosse High School) and changed to navy and gray as the school sits on the Mason–Dixon line, the traditional boundary between slave states and free states.

== Academics ==
13 AP courses are offered at Reitz.

== Demographics ==
The demographic breakdown of the 1,299 students enrolled in 2015–2016 was:

- Male - 49.7%
- Female - 50.3%
- Native American/Alaskan - >0.1%
- Asian/Pacific islanders - 1.3%
- Black - 4.2%
- Hispanic - 1.5%
- White - 87.3%
- Multiracial - 5.7%

40.3% of the students were eligible for free or reduced-cost lunch. FJ Reitz was a Title I school in 2015–2016.

== Sports ==
Reitz Panthers compete in the Southern Indiana Athletic Conference. The school colors are navy and gray. The school's fight song, RHS Boys/Girls, is sung to the tune of On, Wisconsin! "Mighty Panthers" is another popular school song and is played following RHS Boys/Girls by the band. The following IHSAA sanctioned sports are offered:

- Baseball (boys')
- Basketball (boys' and girls')
  - Girls' state champion - 1981
- Cross country (boys' and girls')
- Football (boys')
  - State champions - 2007, 2009
- Golf (boys' and girls')
- Soccer (boys & girls)
- Softball (girls)
- Swimming (boys' and girls')
- Tennis (boys' and girls')
- Track (boys' and girls')
- Volleyball (girls')
- Wrestling (boys' and girls')

== Feeder schools ==
- Perry Heights Middle School
  - Daniel Wertz Elementary School
  - West Terrace Elementary School
- Helfrich Park STEM Academy
  - Cynthia Heights Elementary School
  - Tekoppel Elementary School

== Notable alumni and faculty ==
- Matthew Alan, actor
- Jay Buente, baseball player, pitched for the Purdue University Boilermakers, the Florida Marlins and the Tampa Bay Rays
- Rudy Charles, Total Nonstop Action Wrestling senior referee
- Brian Claybourn, former American football punter and placekicker at Western Kentucky University, and later a player with the Winnipeg Blue Bombers of the Canadian Football League
- Elijah Dunham, baseball player
- Bob Hamilton, professional golfer; 1944 PGA Championship winner
- Don Hansen, played football at Illinois and for 11 seasons in the NFL
- Lilly King, swimmer, gold medalist at 2016 Summer Olympics
- Khristian Lander, Indiana Hoosiers men's basketball and Western Kentucky Hilltoppers men's basketball player
- Paul Musgrave, expert in American foreign policy matters
- Dru Smith, former Evansville Purple Aces men's basketball and Missouri Tigers men's basketball player, current Miami Heat player.
- Matt Williams, producer of The Cosby Show, Home Improvement, and Roseanne

== See also ==
- List of high schools in Indiana
- Refrigerator Bowl, contested at the Reitz Bowl, 1948–1956
