= Academy for Innovative Studies (Evansville) =

Public high school in Evansville, Indiana, US

Coordinates: 37.595500°N 87.331470°W

Academy for Innovative Studies (Diamond)

Location
- 2319 Stringtown Road (Old North High School); Evansville, Indiana; United States

Information
- Type: Public high school
- Established: 2012
- Locale: Mid-size city
- School district: Evansville Vanderburgh School Corporation
- Principal: Hannah Kirkman
- Faculty: 44
- Grades: K-12
- Enrollment: 359
- Color
- Mascot: Phoenix
- Website: ais.evscschools.com

The Academy for Innovative Studies (AIS) is a nontraditional, alternative high school located on Diamond Avenue in Evansville, Indiana. It is a member of the Evansville Vanderburgh School Corporation (EVSC) and serves students requiring specialized or individual educational plans. It occupies the old North High School building.

Prior to 2012, AIS was located solely on First Avenue. The EVSC School Board decided to invest more money in students who are at risk and learn differently from traditional students and opened another AIS campus. The new campus at the old North High School was opened in fall 2012. From 2012 to 2018, the school was split between its two campuses to maximize student flexibility.

In 2018, the EVSC announced the original First Avenue campus would become a separate high school with a different focus, the Harwood Career Preparatory High School. Harwood Prep closed in May 2023, after the school did not meet EVSC expectations. The EVSC announced that instead, each of its five traditional high schools would have its own Harwood Center for students requiring specialized services.

== Details ==
AIS is an alternative school. Open to students in grades 6 to 12, the Academy for Innovative Studies offers a non-traditional learning environment geared to addressing the holistic needs of all students. Prior to enrollment, each student has an Individualized Education Plan or Individualized Service Plan. AIS students have the possibility of graduating with a Core 40 Diploma or earning their GED. With smaller class sizes each student has the opportunity for more individualized attention and instruction. On-site counseling and assessments, provided by community partners, is available to all qualifying students.
