= Ariel Varges =

American newsreel cameraman and war photographer

Ariel Lowe Varges
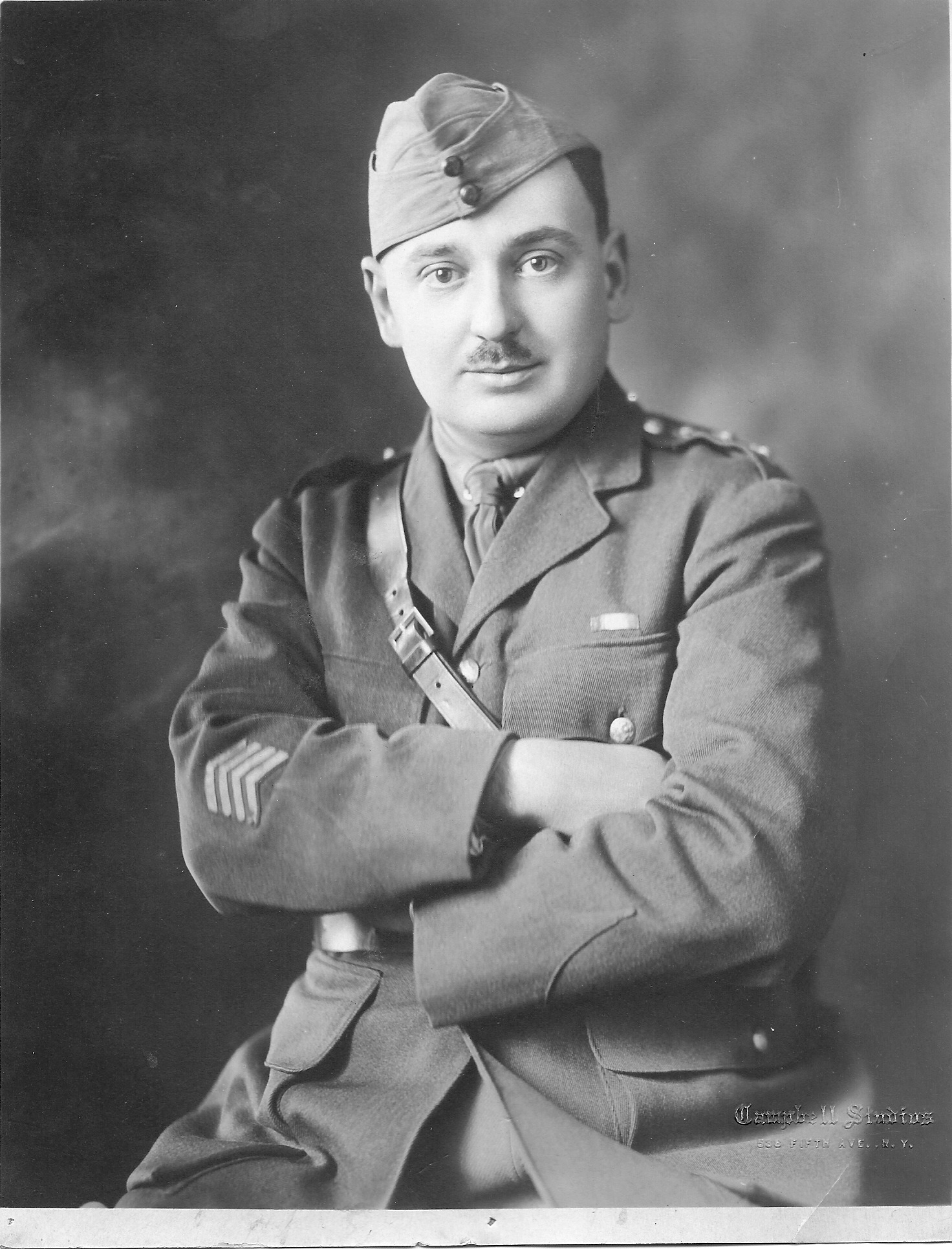
- Born: June 11, 1890; Chicago, Illinois
- Died: December 27, 1972 (aged 82); Norwich, Connecticut
- Occupation: photographer/newsreel cinematographer

Signature
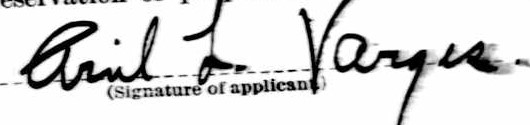

Ariel Lowe Varges (1890–1972) was a photojournalist and pioneering newsreel cameraman for the Hearst media, who covered the First World War extensively.

== Biography ==
Ariel Lowe Varges was born on June 11, 1890, in Chicago, Illinois. His grandfather Charles was born in Germany and emigrated to the United States in the 1850s. Shortly after his graduation from high school Ariel became a photographer for the Chicago Examiner. Around 1911 he moved to New York City and started working for the Hearst newspapers in this city. Varges was one of the first American still photographers who took up a movie camera. He shot his first film in 1914 while covering the Mexican War together with his colleague Ansel Wallace.

Ariel Varges (right) with fellow war photographers near Vera Cruz. From Boston American, 17 May 1914

From 1914, Varges filmed for the Hearst-Selig News Pictorial and he remained a globe trotting war photographer for the Hearst newsreels throughout his career. Varges came to wartime Europe in December 1914. By using his close contacts with Sir Thomas Lipton, he got on a ship for the Serbian front and filmed the war in the Balkans. Varges was by all accounts the first foreign cameraman to film the Great War in Serbia. From 1916, Varges became an official cinematographer for the British Army. He filmed the operations of the Expeditionary Force at Salonika (Thessaloniki), Greece, and later covered the war with the British army in the Middle East and Mesopotamia (Iraq). For his photographic work during World War I Varges was appointed an honorary member of the Most Excellent Order of the British Empire.

Post-war, Ariel Varges' name and reputation became a synonym in the American newspapers for the globetrotting war photographer. He was the first foreign cameraman to film communist leader Trotzky. In the 1920s and 1930s Varges covered wars in China and Ethiopia for the Hearst newsreels. In the 1950s he headed the photographic laboratory of Hearst's newsreel show News of the Day.

Ariel Varges died at the age of 82 on December 27, 1972, in Norwich, Connecticut. He was buried at Preston Cemetery.

== Film work ==
Varges' films taken during the First World War were shown extensively in the American movie theaters. Upon reaching Belgrade he filed his first report for the Hearst-Selig News Pictorial No. 34 which was shown in the American theaters on April 29, 1915. This newsreel has scenes showing Sir Thomas Lipton with Serbian Red Cross officials, as well as the first pictures shown in the U.S. of Crown Prince Alexander I, king regent of Serbia. Varges also took exclusive films of Major Vojislav Tankosić, one of the founders of the Black Hand group which was instrumental in recruiting Gavrilo Princip, the man who killed Austrian Crown Prince Franz Ferdinand at Sarajevo, thus propelling Europe into the First World War.

Varges' newsreels taken with the Serbs have been posted online by the Jugoslavenska Kinoteka on the website of the European Film Gateway. While researching their book American Cinematographers in the Great War, film historians Ron van Dopperen and Cooper C. Graham discovered a large amount of newsreel footage that was shot by Varges during World War I. Apart from films found at the Library of Congress footage shot by Varges was traced through News on Screen, an online database by the British Universities Film & Video Council, that has 47 records of scenes taken by Varges between 1916 and 1919.

The authors also discovered many World War I films taken by Varges in the collection of the Imperial War Museum.

== Works ==
War in the Balkans filmed by Ariel Varges, 1915

Tirailleurs Annamites rest in a military camp near Salonika soon after their arrival in Macedonia, during Macedonian front, May 1916

== Sources ==
- Kevin Brownlow, The War, the West and the Wilderness (London/New York 1979)
- James W. Castellan, Ron van Dopperen, Cooper C. Graham, American Cinematographers in the Great War, 1914-1918 (New Barnet 2014) https://doi.org/10.2307%2Fj.ctt1bmzn8c
- Book review "American Cinematographers in the Great War, 1914-1914" Historical Journal of Film, Radio & Television (2016)
- Weblog on the American Films and Cinematographers of World War I, 2013-2018
- Jane Carmichael, First World War Photographers (London/New York 1989)
- War in the Balkans, filmed by Ariel Varges (newsreel scenes taken with the Serbian army in 1915)
- Movie Trailer "American Cinematographers in the Great War, 1914-1918"
- Newspaper reports on Ariel Varges and his film coverage in World War I with the Serbian army
