= Trinity United Methodist Church (Evansville, Indiana) =

Historic building in Evansville, Indiana

- U.S. National Register of Historic Places
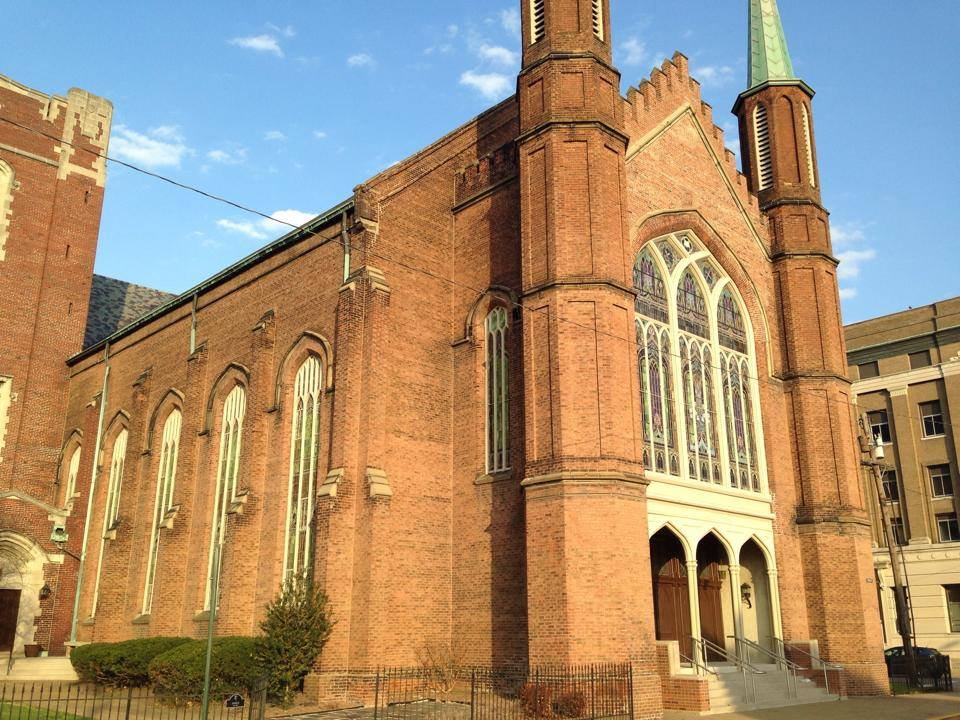

- Location within Indiana Location within the United States
- Location: 216 Third St., Evansville, Indiana
- Coordinates: 37°58′08″N 87°34′13″W
- Area: less than one acre
- Built: 1866
- MPS: Downtown Evansville MRA
- NRHP reference No.: 82005248
- Added to NRHP: July 1, 1982

Trinity United Methodist Church is a historic United Methodist church located in downtown Evansville, Indiana. The congregation began in 1825 as a Methodist class and its Gothic Revival style brick church building was completed in 1866. It was listed on the National Register of Historic Places in 1982.

== Architecture and construction ==
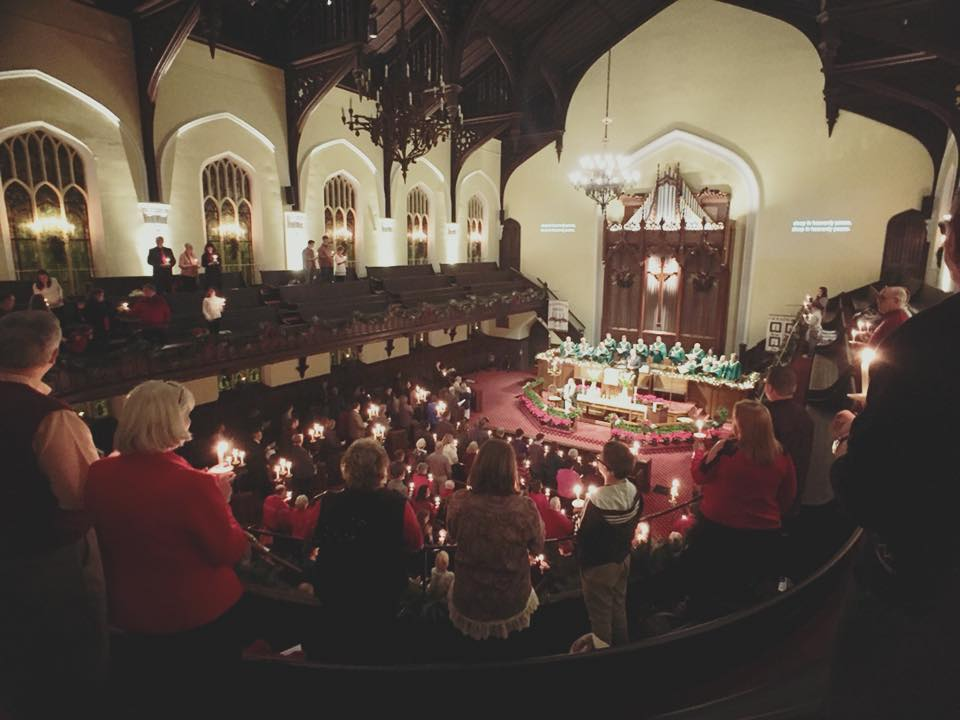
Interior of Trinity UMC during a candle light Christmas service

The architectural firm Mursinna & Boyd designed the church's primary 150-by-76-foot structure, modeling it after St. Paul's M. E. Church in Newark, New Jersey (dedicated in 1856). In 1864 the Evansville Daily Journal reported the church hoped to provide "one of the very handsomest church edifices in the whole western country."

Work on the church began in early 1864 in the midst of the American Civil War, providing substantial challenges since many of the church's congregants fought in the conflict and their families back home dealt with related stress. By June 1865, an upper meeting room later called Craig Hall was completed and housed services until the main sanctuary was finished in spring 1866. The new building was formally dedicated on March 25, 1866. The final construction included approximately 400,000 bricks.

The interior of the original church included a grand auditorium, three classrooms, a minister's study, a trustees' meeting room, and a 36-by-68 foot lecture room on the second floor (later called Craig Hall). In the 1920s Trinity added a Tudor-style wing containing classrooms, offices, a kitchen, and full gymnasium.

Replacing the Greek Revival columns, pediments, and large cornices popular earlier in the nineteenth century, Gothic-style buildings had gained popularity by the 1840s as the Romantic movement in Europe rediscovered heavenward-pointed arches of the Middle Ages. Except for spires and window size, Trinity's exterior is identical to St. Paul's M. E. Church in Newark. Inside there are more significant differences, including the height of the ceiling and the height of the windows, with Trinity's much higher in both cases.

Trinity's facade consists of two towering spires, one on each side extending vertically into the air. Such vertical facades were common among European Gothic churches. In choosing a twin spire facade, the architect separated the design for Trinity from the traditional American (Protestant) Gothic revival church which called for a single frontal spire. Although the church lacks cross-ribbed vaults which are typical of Gothic Revival architecture, Trinity does feature buttresses, pointed arches, and other characteristics giving form to the Gothic beauty, including arched openings and an octagonal steeple.

== History ==
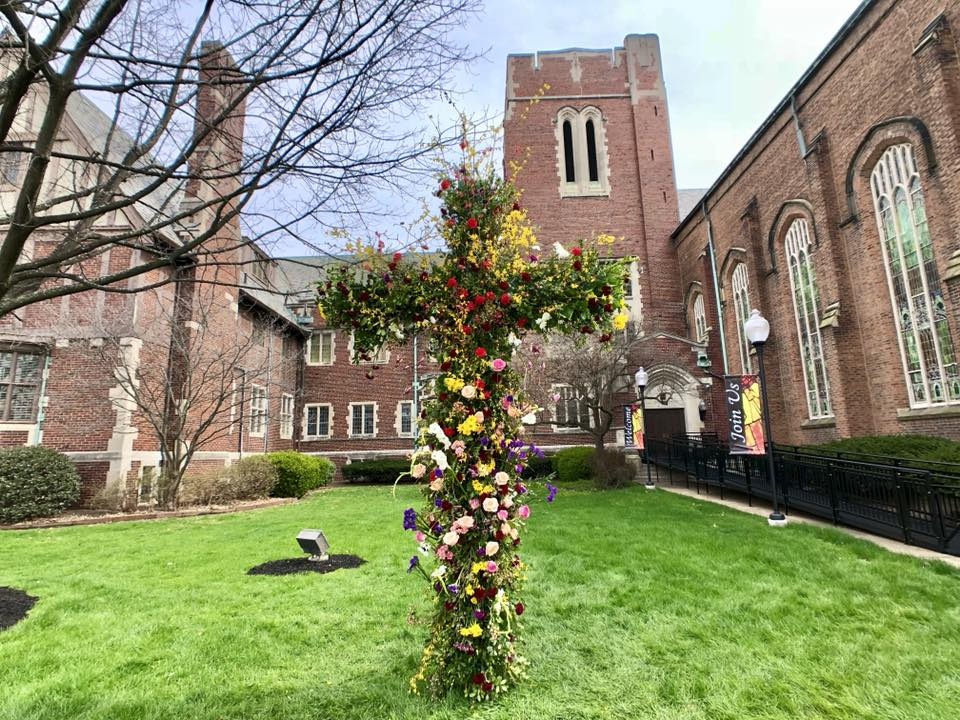
Exterior courtyard of Trinity UMC on Easter Sunday with its "living cross"

Trinity traces its beginning to a Methodist class formed in 1825 by Robert Parrett and 11 other Evansville residents. The group built their first building in 1839 in downtown Evansville between Second and Third Streets and on the south side of Locust Street, naturally calling it the Locust Street Methodist Episcopal Church.

By 1860 Trinity's members began planning their larger structure that exists today. The church's minister during the construction (which coincided with the Civil War) was Rev. Albion Fellows, father to social reformer Albion Fellows Bacon and author Annie Fellows Johnston. Both sisters later married their respective husbands at the church on the same day (October 11, 1888). Due to the church's geographical move away from Locust Street, it needed a new name and the congregation decided upon Trinity Methodist Episcopal Church.

Trinity helped plant most other Methodist churches in the region and also created or helped create many organizations, including the University of Evansville and local chapters of YWCA, Habitat for Humanity, Tri-State Food Bank, soup kitchens, and Meals on Wheels. Throughout its history many of Evansville's most prominent citizens have been members of the church, including the Bacons, the Ingles, the Igleharts, and Congressman Lee H. Hamilton (whose father served as Trinity's pastor from 1943 to 1953).
