= North High School (Indiana) =

- Evansville North High School

Location
- 15331 Highway 41 North; Evansville, Vanderburgh County, Indiana 47725; United States; 38.115237°N 87.551358°W

Information
- Type: Public high school
- Established: 1956
- Locale: Mid-size city
- School district: Evansville Vanderburgh School Corporation
- Principal: Katy Rogers Elmer
- Teaching staff: 93.88 (FTE)
- Grades: 9-12
- Enrollment: 1,643 (2023-2024)
- Student to teacher ratio: 17.50
- Color
- Athletics conference: Southern Indiana Athletic Conference
- Team name: Huskies
- Rival: Evansville Central High School
- Gym Capacity: 3,457
- Website: Evansville North High School

North High School, or Evansville North High School, is a public high school located in Vanderburgh County, Indiana, United States.

== History ==
After the city/county merger in 1958, this district included Vogel, Delaware, Scott, Evans, and Oak Hill Schools, as well as some students from Howard Roosa and Stringtown Schools. This huge district stayed relatively stable through desegregation and a middle school reorganization. The high school, located on Diamond Avenue on the northern side of the city, was almost closed due to low enrollment in 1983. Since the community's successful effort to save the school, the northeastern part of the county has experienced massive population growth. A sixth feeder school was added in 2019 in McCutchanville, replacing the original McCutchanville School that was consolidated into Oak Hill School in 1965.

On November 4, 2008, Vanderburgh County voters approved a $149 million bond issue for the EVSC. A long list of projects included a new $58.2 million high school for 2,000 students and an adjacent $27 million junior high school for 1,000 students. In late November 2008, the EVSC purchased around 80 acres (320,000 m^{2}) near U.S. 41 and Baseline Road, nine miles north of Evansville, for the new campus. The new North High School building opened in January 2012, complete with its first football stadium.

=== North principals ===
- 1956–1967: Adrian Meadows
- 1967-1969: The Brad
- 1969–1981: Harold Buck
- 1981–1999: James Sharp
- 1999–2009: Brenda Weber
- 2009–2026: John Skinner
- 2026-Present: Katy Rogers Elmer

== School District ==
=== Elementary schools (K-6) ===
- Scott Elementary School
- Oak Hill Elementary School
- Vogel Elementary School
- Evans Elementary School
- Delaware Elementary School
- McCutchanville Elementary School

=== Middle schools (7-8) ===
- North Junior High School

== Sports ==
Also see: Sports in Evansville

Evansville North High School IHSAA Athletic Championships
SPORT	TITLES	YEAR(S)
Baseball	1	1962*
Boys' basketball	1	1967
Boys' golf	1	2000
Girls' golf	6	2014, 2015, 2016, 2018, 2020, 2021
Total	8

* Baseball title was won before IHSAA State Tournament was initiated.

North High School competes in the Southern Indiana Athletic Conference, which is a part of the Indiana High School Athletic Association.

== Old North High School ==
The old North High School facility is now used as the Academy for Innovative studies Diamond Branch, though AIS only takes up a small percentage of the school. The auditorium is still host to numerous musicals and plays, such as a 2014 production of Les Misèrables.

== Notable alumni ==
- Chuck Bundrant, billionaire businessman, founder, chairman and majority owner of Trident Seafoods Namesake of Bundrant Stadium on the current campus
- Deke Cooper, NFL player
- Bob Ford, ABA player and television executive
- John C. Martin, former CEO and executive chairman of the board Gilead Sciences
- Brian Merriweather, professional basketball player
- Jeff Overton, PGA Tour player
- Josh Tudela, MLS player
- Dave Schellhase, All-American basketball player, NBA player, longtime college basketball coach
