= Lowell Galloway =

American basketball player

Personal information
- Born: July 7, 1921 Beech Grove, Kentucky
- Died: February 11, 1979 (aged 57) Evansville, Indiana
- Listed height: 6 ft 4 in (1.93 m)
- Listed weight: 210 lb (95 kg)

Career information
- High school: Central (Evansville, Indiana)
- College: Evansville (1940–1943)
- Playing career: 1946–1947
- Position: Forward / center

Career history

Playing
- 1946–1947: Indianapolis Kautskys

Coaching
- 1948–1950: Cannelton HS
- 1950–1953: Fort Branch HS
- 1962–1967: Harrison HS
- 1971–1975: Harrison HS (assistant)

Lowell Newton Galloway (July 7, 1921 – February 11, 1979) was an American professional basketball player. He played for the Indianapolis Kautskys in the National Basketball League and averaged 1.7 points per game during 1946–47. He played college basketball at the University of Evansville.

After his professional career ended, Galloway went into coaching and teaching. He died from a stroke in 1979.
