= Albion Flats =

- U.S. National Register of Historic Places
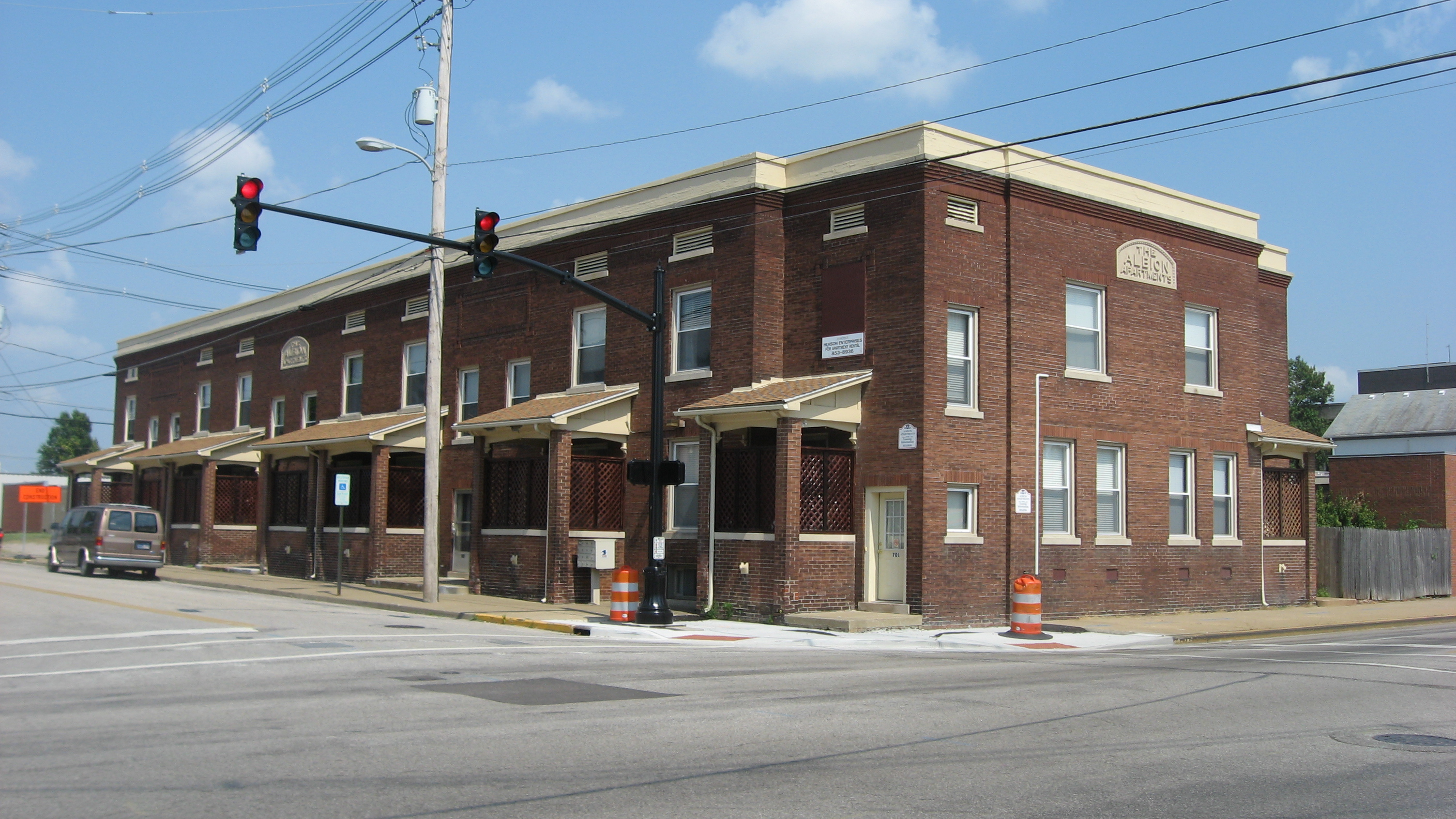
- View from Martin Luther King, Jr. Blvd.

- Location within Indiana Location within the United States
- Location: 701 Court St., Evansville, Indiana
- Coordinates: 37.97574°N 87.56955°W
- Area: less than one acre
- Built: 1911
- Architect: Shopbell & Company
- Architectural style: Prairie School
- MPS: Downtown Evansville MRA
- NRHP reference No.: 82000093
- Added to NRHP: July 1, 1982

Albion Flats (sometimes referred to as Albion Terrace" or simply The Albion) is a housing unit in downtown Evansville, Indiana. Built in 1911, it was designed by the architectural firm Shopbell & Company and was named after reformer Albion Fellows Bacon. It was listed on the National Register of Historic Places in 1982.
