= Brian Claybourn =

American gridiron football player (born 1981)

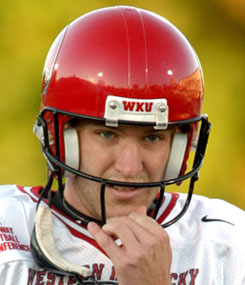

No. 8
- Positions: Punter, placekicker

Personal information
- Born: October 21, 1981; Evansville, Indiana, U.S.

Career information
- College: Western Kentucky

Career history
- 2006: Winnipeg Blue Bombers

Brian Claybourn (born October 21, 1981) is an American former professional football punter and placekicker who played for the Winnipeg Blue Bombers of the Canadian Football League. He played college football at Western Kentucky University.

== Early life ==
Claybourn was a standout punter and kicker at FJ Reitz High School in Evansville, Indiana. As a punter during his senior year, he averaged 37 yards per kick with nine downed inside the 10-yard line. His junior year, he also averaged 37 yards per kick with a long kick of 59 yards. He was named all-state, all-area, all-metro, all-conference, and all-city as a high school punter.

== College career ==
Claybourn elected to play college football at Western Kentucky University (WKU) and finished his career there with the best single-season punting performance in school history with a 43.4 yard average. He finished second all-time at WKU with 9,237 yards, 226 punts, and an average of 40.87 yards per kick. He served as a WKU team captain during the team's Division I Football Championship Subdivision (I-AA) national championship in 2002 season and an 11th ranking in the 2004 final national polls.

Claybourn's performance at WKU drew rave reviews. Head coach Jack Harbaugh said, "He's as instrumental as your quarterback, as instrumental as anybody you have on your team." WKU special teams coach Craig Aukerman said, "When people hear the word 'punter' or 'kicker,' they say that they aren't real athletes. But he's redefined the role as a punter."

Claybourn tallied a number of awards and honors during his college career, including ESPN/USA Today I-AA Special Teams Player of the Week (2004), The Sports Network and AP Third-team All-America Team (2004), Football Gazette I-AA Pre-season All-America team (2004), First-team All-Gateway Football Conference Team (2003-04), Second-team All-Academic Team (2004 -03), GFC Special Teams Player of the Week (2002), and All-Gateway Conference (2001-02).

== Professional career ==
Claybourn attended the San Diego Chargers' training camp in 2005 and attended a Dallas Cowboys' mini-camp in 2006.

In 2006 Claybourn signed with the Winnipeg Blue Bombers of the Canadian Football League. He punted 18 times with a 38.4 yard average during his year with the team.
