= Ansel E. Wallace =

American photojournalist and newsreel cameraman

Ansel. E. Wallace
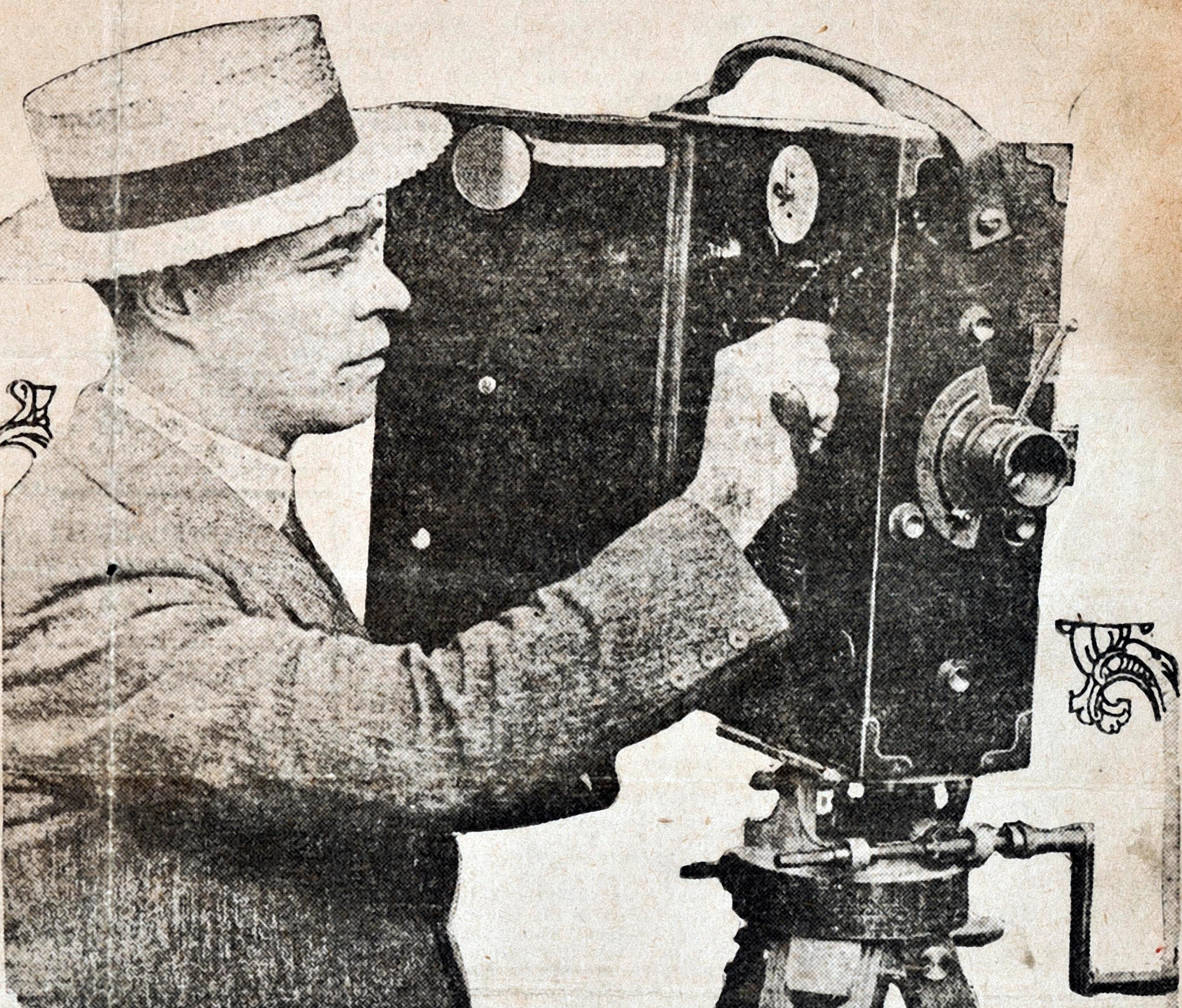
- Ansel Wallace with movie camera, 1915
- Born: October 30, 1884; South Bend, Indiana, US
- Died: December 19, 1941 (aged 57); Evansville, Indiana, US
- Occupation: photographer/newsreel cinematographer
- Spouse: Virginia M. Wallace

Signature
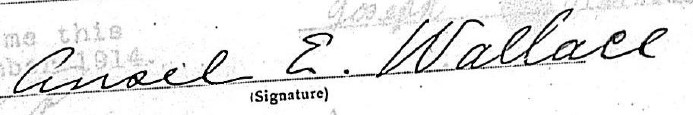

Ansel Earle Wallace (October 30, 1884 – December 19, 1941) was an American photojournalist and newsreel cameraman who gained prominence in 1915 when he covered World War I.

== Early life and career ==
Ansel Earle Wallace was born on October 30, 1884, in South Bend, Indiana. His father and his brother Harry were all photographers. In 1909, Wallace went to New York City where he started working as a press photographer for the newspapers of William Randolph Hearst. He shot his first film in 1914 while covering the Mexican War together with his colleague Ariel Varges.

Sent to Europe in November 1914 by Hearst, Wallace filmed the German offensive on the Eastern Front, was captured by a German submarine when he tried to cross the English Channel and finally made his way to Italy to report on the Italian entry into the war.

One of the first newsreel cameramen in American film history, Wallace had a major scoop in 1915 with his pictures of the new super submarines that were deployed by the German Navy.

Wallace returned to America in July 1915. By 1918 he had left the Hearst news service and for the rest of his life Wallace worked for Wallace and Sons Photography. He died in Evansville, Indiana, on December 19, 1941, and was buried in Oak Hill Cemetery.

== Film work ==
Wallace's films taken during World War I were shown in the Hearst-Selig News Pictorial. Some of these newsreels have been located in the collection of the Library of Congress and the Austrian Film Archives by film historians Cooper C. Graham and Ron van Dopperen while researching their book American Cinematographers in the Great War, 1914-1918, notably scenes taken on the Eastern Front, at a military training camp near Frankfurt, Germany, and a rare scene showing Field Marshal von Hindenburg and his staff.

Cameraman Ansel E. Wallace filming World War I

Field Marshal Von Hindenburg and staff filmed by Ansel Wallace, 1915

Numerous still pictures taken by Wallace at the front have also been identified by the authors.

== Sources ==
- Kevin Brownlow, The War, the West and the Wilderness (London/New York 1979)
- James W. Castellan, Ron van Dopperen, Cooper C. Graham, American Cinematographers in the Great War, 1914-1918 (New Barnet, 2014) https://doi.org/10.2307%2Fj.ctt1bmzn8c
- Book review "American Cinematographers in the Great War, 1914-1914" Historical Journal of Film, Radio & Television (2016)
- Ron van Dopperen and Cooper C. Graham, "Cameraman A.E. Wallace on the Eastern Front (1915)", World War One Illustrated, (Summer 2025), 30-36
- Newspaper reports published in 1920 by A.E. Wallace on his experiences as a war photographer in Mexico and Europe during World War I
- Weblog on the American Films and Cinematographers of World War I, 2013-2018
- Newspaper report by A.E. Wallace on how he covered the new German super submarines for the Hearst media (April 1915)
- Newsreel footage taken by A.E. Wallace, showing the training of German troops in Frankfurt (December 1914)
- Movie Trailer "American Cinematographers in the Great War, 1914-1918"
