= Evansville Vanderburgh School Corporation =

School district in Indiana

Location
- 951 Walnut Street; Evansville, Indiana United States

Students and staff
- Athletic conference: SIAC

Other information
- Website: Official website

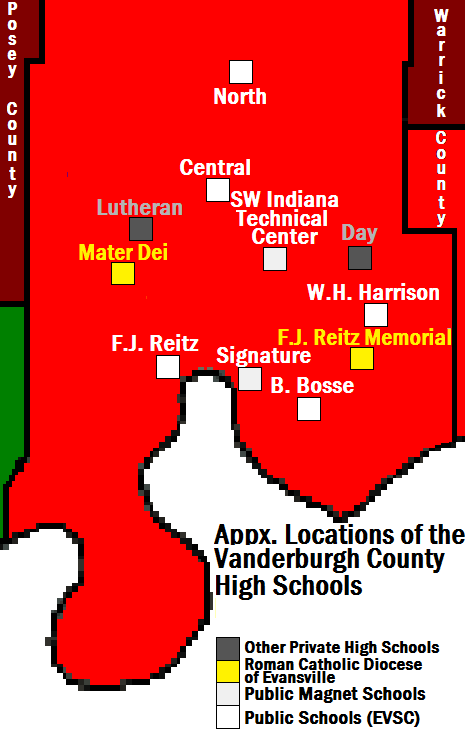
Vanderburgh High School & Charter School Locations EVSC schools are in

Location of Vanderburgh County within Indiana

The Evansville Vanderburgh School Corporation (EVSC) is a public school corporation serving Evansville, Indiana and Vanderburgh County; its boundary includes the entire county. It is the third largest school district in the state of Indiana, behind Indianapolis Public Schools and Fort Wayne Community Schools and the largest in Southern Indiana. The headquarters are located on Walnut Street in downtown Evansville. The school district serves nearly 23,000 students educated by more than 1,600 teachers.

The Evansville Vanderburgh School Corporation comprises 37 different schools – 17 elementary schools, 7 middle schools, 4 K-8 schools, 5 high schools and 4 magnet schools, one of which draws students from 8 other school corporations across 4 other counties.

On November 4, 2008, voters approved a $149 million bond issue for the Evansville Vanderburgh School Corporation, which paid for the new North High school and a list of other projects.

== Elementary, K-8, and Middle Schools ==
=== Elementary schools ===
- Caze Elementary K-5
- Cynthia Heights Elementary K-5
- Daniel Wertz Elementary PK-5
- Delaware School K-6
- Dexter Elementary K-5
- Evans School PK-6
- Fairlawn Elementary K-5
- Harper Elementary K-5
- Hebron Elementary K-5
- Highland Elementary K-5
- McCutchanville Elementary K-6
- Oak Hill School K-6
- Scott School PK-6
- Stockwell Elementary K-5
- Stringtown Elementary K-5
- Tekoppel Elementary K-5
- Vogel School K-6
- West Terrace Elementary K-5

=== K-8 ===
- Cedar Hall Community School PK-8
- Glenwood Leadership Academy
- Lincoln School K-8
- Lodge Community School

=== Middle schools ===
- Helfrich Park STEM Academy
- McGary Middle School
- North Junior High School
- Perry Heights Middle School
- Thompkins Middle School
- Washington Middle School

== High schools ==
School	Type	Enrollment
Central High School	Public	1,237
North High School	Public	1,550
FJ Reitz High School	Public	1,355
Harrison High School	Public	1,166
Benjamin Bosse High School	Public	764
Southern Indiana Career & Technical Center *	Public	788
New Tech Institute	Public	322
Virtual Academy	Public	22
Academy for Innovative Studies (Diamond Ave)	Public	248

*The Southern Indiana Career & Technical Center draws students from eight school districts.
