= Deke Cooper =

American football player (born 1977)

No. 35
- Position: Safety

Personal information
- Born: October 18, 1977 (age 49); Swainsboro, Georgia, U.S.
- Listed height: 6 ft 2 in (1.88 m)
- Listed weight: 210 lb (95 kg)

Career information
- High school: North (Evansville, Indiana)
- College: Notre Dame
- NFL draft: 2000: undrafted

Career history
- Arizona Cardinals (2000–2001)*; → Rhein Fire (2001); Cleveland Browns (2001)*; Carolina Panthers (2002); →Rhein Fire (2002); Jacksonville Jaguars (2003–2005); Miami Dolphins (2006)*; San Francisco 49ers (2006); Carolina Panthers (2007); Atlanta Falcons (2008)*
- * Offseason or practice squad member only

Awards and highlights
- 2× All-NFL Europe (2001-2002); NFL Europe Defensive MVP (2002)

Career NFL statistics
- Total tackles: 218
- Forced fumbles: 3
- Fumble recoveries: 2
- Pass deflections: 15
- Interceptions: 6
- Stats at Pro Football Reference

John Delvicchio "Deke" Cooper (born October 18, 1977) is an American former professional football player who was a safety in the National Football League (NFL). He played college football for the Notre Dame Fighting Irish and was signed by the Arizona Cardinals as an undrafted free agent in 2000.

== Early life ==
Cooper attended North High School in Evansville, Indiana, where he reached the finals of the Indiana High School Athletic Association's State Championship Football Playoffs. Cooper was nominated for the 1995 Mr. Football Award. Cooper also played basketball and was a state meet qualifier in four events (300 Hurdles, Long Jump, High Jump, and 4x100 Relay) in Track and Field.

== College career ==
At the University of Notre Dame, Cooper played in 45 games with 25 starts and totaled 203 tackles, six interceptions, four fumble recoveries, seven forced fumbles and five passes defensed, returning one fumble for a touchdown. Cooper graduated from Notre Dame in 2000 with a degree in sociology.

== Professional career ==
=== Early career (2000–2002) ===
Following the 2000 NFL draft on April 28, 2000, he was signed by the Arizona Cardinals as an undrafted free agent. In the spring of 2001, the Cardinals allocated Cooper to the Rhein Fire of NFL Europe. Earning All-NFL Europe honors, Cooper started 10 games and led NFL Europe with six interceptions in 2001. The Cardinals waived Cooper on September 2, 2001. On September 20, Cooper signed with the Cleveland Browns practice squad before being released on October 9, 2001.

Cooper signed on January 16, 2002, with the Carolina Panthers. That spring, Cooper had his second assignment with the Rhein Fire. Again starting 10 games, Cooper had 54 tackles, five interceptions, and eight passes defended for the Fire and earned Defensive MVP and all-league honors from NFL Europe. In his first season with NFL game appearances, Cooper played in 10 games with two tackles for the Panthers in 2002. The Panthers waived Cooper on August 31, 2003.

=== Jacksonville Jaguars (2003–2005) ===
On September 16, 2003, Cooper signed with the Jacksonville Jaguars. Playing in 14 games with 10 starts at free safety in 2003, Cooper had 60 tackles, one interception, four passes defended, and one fumble recovery. In 2004, Cooper played in all 16 games as a backup, with 38 tackles, one interception, two passes defended, and two forced fumbles. His one interception in 2004 sealed a 22–16 win over the Kansas City Chiefs, as Cooper intercepted a Hail Mary pass by Trent Green on the final play of the game. Cooper returned to a starting role in 2005, this time at strong safety. In 16 games with 12 starts, Cooper had 58 tackles, one interception, five passes defended, and one fumble recovery.

=== Later career (2006–2008) ===
Cooper signed with the Miami Dolphins as an unrestricted free agent on April 6, 2006, but was released on September 2. On December 18 that year, Cooper signed with the San Francisco 49ers, and he appeared in the 49ers' season finale on December 31, a 26–23 win at the Denver Broncos.

On March 26, 2007, he signed with the Panthers for the second time. Again starting at strong safety in 2007, Cooper played in 16 games with 15 starts. Cooper had 59 tackles, a career high three interceptions, four passes defended, and one forced fumble.

On June 18, 2008, he signed with the Atlanta Falcons. Following the preseason, the Falcons released Cooper on August 30.

== NFL career statistics ==
Legend
**Bold**	Career high

=== Regular season ===
Year	Team	Games		Tackles					Interceptions					Fumbles			
Year	Team	GP	GS	Cmb	Solo	Ast	Sck	TFL	Int	Yds	TD	Lng	PD	FF	FR	Yds	TD
2002	CAR	10	0	2	2	0	0.0	0	0	0	0	0	0	0	0	0	0
2003	JAX	14	10	**60**	42	**18**	0.0	**1**	1	12	0	12	4	0	**1**	**10**	0
2004	JAX	**16**	0	38	34	4	**1.0**	0	1	0	0	0	2	**2**	0	0	0
2005	JAX	**16**	12	58	**48**	10	0.0	0	1	0	0	0	**5**	0	**1**	0	0
2006	SFO	1	0	1	1	0	0.0	0	0	0	0	0	0	0	0	0	0
2007	CAR	**16**	**15**	59	46	13	0.0	0	**3**	**19**	0	**19**	4	1	0	0	0
		73	37	218	173	45	1.0	1	6	31	0	19	15	3	2	10	0

=== Playoffs ===
Year	Team	Games		Tackles					Interceptions					Fumbles			
Year	Team	GP	GS	Cmb	Solo	Ast	Sck	TFL	Int	Yds	TD	Lng	PD	FF	FR	Yds	TD
2005	JAX	**1**	0	0	0	0	0.0	0	0	0	0	0	0	0	0	0	0
		1	0	0	0	0	0.0	0	0	0	0	0	0	0	0	0	0

== Personal life ==
Cooper married Gwen Crisp in 2006. They have six children. After retiring from football, Cooper founded Future Leaders Christian Academy, a day care center in the Atlanta area.
