= Evansville Central High School =

Central High School Evansville Central High School
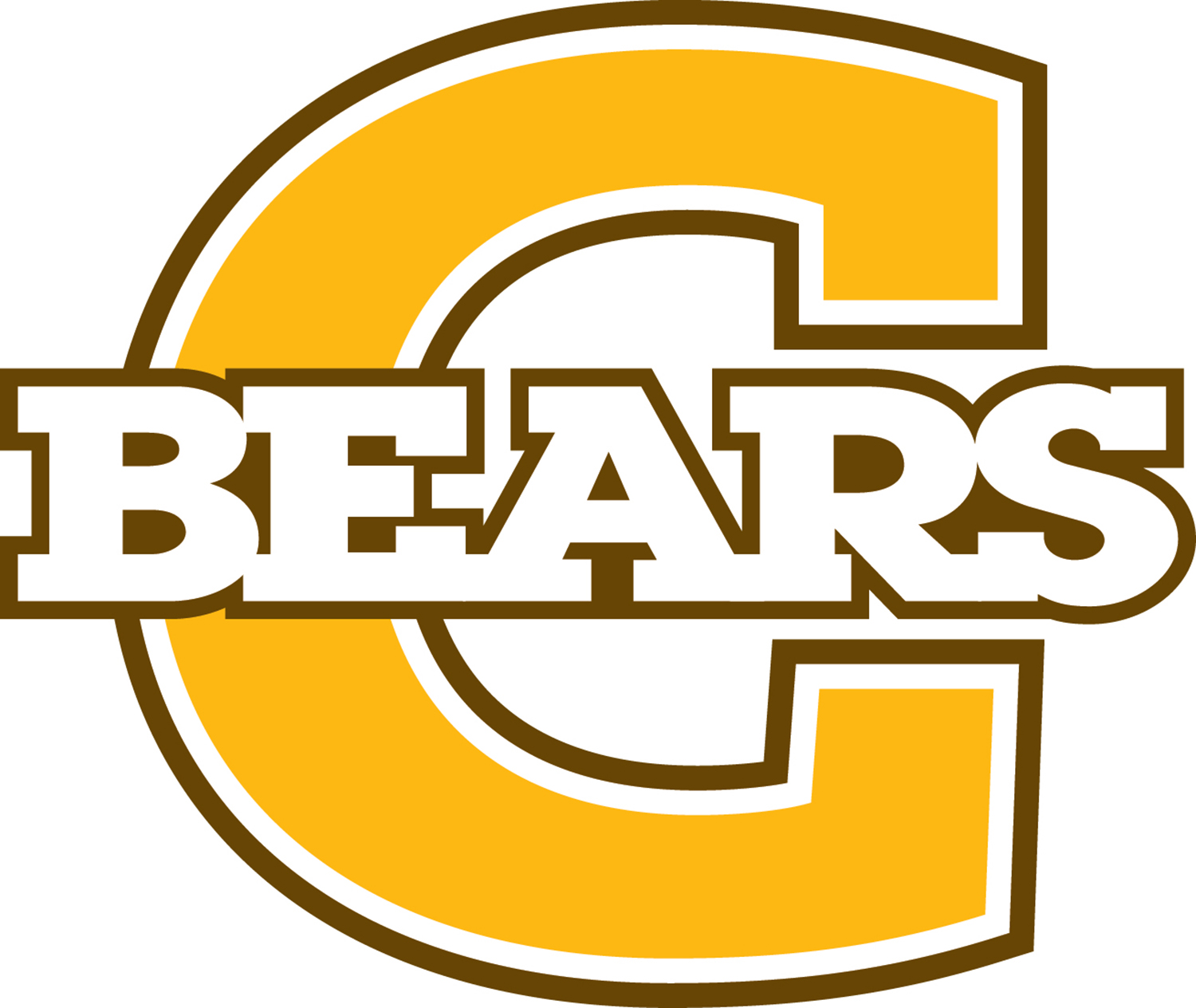

Location
- 5400 North First Avenue; Evansville, Vanderburgh County, Indiana 47710; United States; 38°1′45″N 87°34′45″W

Information
- Type: Public high school
- Established: 1854
- School district: Evansville Vanderburgh School Corporation
- Principal: Andrew Freeman
- Assistant Principals: Chris Jones (Dean's Office); Regina St. Clair (Programming Office)
- Teaching staff: 76.79 (FTE)
- Grades: 9-12
- Enrollment: 1,126 (2023-2024)
- Student to teacher ratio: 14.66
- Color
- Athletics conference: Southern Indiana Athletic Conference
- Team name: Bears
- Rival: North High School
- Gym Capacity: 3,300
- Website: Evansville Central High School

Evansville Central High School, also known as Central High, is a public high school on the north side of Evansville, Indiana. It is the oldest high school in continuous operation west of the Allegheny Mountains. It was established in 1854 as Evansville High School. The name was changed to Central High School in 1918 when FJ Reitz High School was built.

Central moved to its current location on the far north side of Evansville in the early 1970s. It is sometimes called "Vanderburgh Central" because of its location near the geographic center of Vanderburgh County, in addition to its status as the county's oldest high school. For many years, it was the northernmost high school in the Evansville Vanderburgh School Corporation; it was four miles northwest of Evansville North High School. However, with the completion of the new North High School campus in northern Vanderburgh County, geographic correctness was restored to the name.

== Academics ==
Central High School received an "A" as its final letter grade for school accountability.

As of October 2024, Central High School is ranked 62nd in Indiana, and 2nd in the EVSC by USNews. 37% of students participate in an AP course.

== Athletics ==
The Central Bears compete in the Southern Indiana Athletic Conference. The school colors are brown and gold.

As of the 2024–2025 academic year, the following Indiana High School Athletic Association (IHSAA) sanctioned sports were offered:

- Baseball (boys)
- Basketball (girls and boys)
- Cross Country (girls and boys)
- Football (boys)
- Golf (girls and boys)
- Soccer (girls and boys)
- Softball (girls)
- Swimming and diving (girls and boys)
- Tennis (girls and boys)
- Track and field (girls and boys)
- Volleyball (girls)
- Wrestling (girls and boys)

== Notable alumni ==
- Albion Fellows Bacon (1865–1933), housing and social reformer and writer
- Andy Benes (born 1967), Major League Baseball player
- John W. Boehne Jr. (1895–1973), former member of US House of Representatives.
- Winfield K. Denton (1896–1971), lawyer and former member of US House of Representatives and Indiana House of Representatives
- Lowell Galloway (1921–1979), professional basketball player
- Adaline Glasheen (1920–1993), Joyce scholar, author, and college professor
- Lee H. Hamilton (1931–2026), U.S. Democratic Representative, Indiana 9th Congressional District
- Cecilia Hennel Hendricks (1883–1969), Former professor at Indiana University, author
- Arthur Wilbur Henn (1890–1959), ichthyologist and herpetologist, former Curator of Fishes at Carnegie Museum of Natural History
- Chuck Hornbostel (1911–1989), olympic middle-distance runner, president of Financial Executive Institute of New York
- Preston Mattingly (born 1987), baseball player and executive
- Robert D. Orr (1917–2004), former Governor of Indiana from 1981 to 1989
- Aaron Patzer (born 1980), entrepreneur and founder of Mint.com personal financial management service
- Boots Randolph (1927–2007), saxophone player
- Halla Tómasdóttir (born 1968), President of Iceland
- Lloyd Winnecke (born 1960), former Mayor of Evansville

== Academy of Science and Medicine ==
Founded in 2011, Academy of Science and Medicine, also known as ASM, is a public half-day high school program hosted within and sharing faculty with Central High School. The program is open to students in the EVSC, as well as schools in the surrounding area. The program employs roughly 16 teachers and enrolls over 250 students from area schools. ASM was founded as the Medical Professions Academy, or MPA, but was renamed in 2023 to Academy of Science and Medicine. The EVSC purchased a building in downtown Evansville to be used as a future expansion to the program. The goal of the program is to prepare students for college and post-secondary education, with a focus on careers and degrees in medicine and science. The program integrates science, English, and technology into its curriculum. ASM has partnerships with local universities including University of Southern Indiana, University of Evansville, Ivy Tech Community College, Purdue University, IU School of Medicine, Vanderbilt University, Johns Hopkins University, and Lipscomb University. The partnerships offer college visits and scholarships to prospective students.

In a partnership with the EVSC and University of Evansville, ASM announced the Innovation Center for Science and Health, intended to serve as a learning site shared between ASM and UE. Construction had started on June 9, 2025, and was planned to open in 2026. On November 26, 2025, the EVSC terminated the $1.7 million agreement to purchase the site following a unanimous school board vote. The building had fallen into disrepair following the partial demolishing, and would have cost an estimated $25 million to return the building to a usable state.

== See also ==
- List of high schools in Indiana
