= Noncompliant =

American musician

- Birth name: Lisa Smith
- Also known as: DJ Shiva
- Genres: Techno
- Occupation(s): DJ, producer
- Years active: c. 1995–present

Lisa Smith, performing as Noncompliant and formerly known as DJ Shiva, is an American DJ and record producer.

== Life ==
Smith is originally from Evansville, Indiana. She moved to Indianapolis in 1996.

== Career ==
Smith's current stage name is derived from the comic Bitch Planet, in which women who fail to observe patriarchal rules are termed "noncompliant". She adopted the moniker in 2017, and has said that it is "very much based in queerness and feminism". Smith has spoken in favor of equality for women in electronic music.

Smith has performed sets at Berghain's Panorama Bar, on UK radio station Rinse FM, and at Detroit's Movement electronic music festival.

Although primarily a DJ, Smith released an original EP titled More Than Surviving in 2017. A reviewer for Resident Advisor observed that, although described as techno, More Than Surviving has house influences. Smith also contributed a single titled "Femslash" to a 2017 compilation, described as a "loopy acid cut with a sense of humor".

As of 2018, she had been performing as a DJ for approximately 20 years. She purchased her first set of turntables in 1995.

== Discography ==
- More Than Surviving (EP, 2017)
- "Femslash" (single, 2017)
