= Paul Musgrave =

American political science professor

- Education: Georgetown University (Ph.D.); University College Dublin (M.A.); Indiana University (B.A.)
- Occupation: Associate Professor
- Website: paulmusgrave.info

Paul Musgrave is an associate professor of government at Georgetown University in Qatar and an expert in American foreign policy matters. He teaches courses in international relations theory, history and international relations, energy politics, U.S. foreign policy, and politics and science fiction.

Musgrave received a Ph.D. in government from Georgetown University. During that time he served as a visiting assistant professor at Dickinson College and as a research fellow at the Georgetown University School of Foreign Service in Qatar. Prior to that he earned a Master of Arts degree in politics from the University College Dublin and a Bachelor of Arts degree from Indiana University, where he was selected as a Wells Scholar and named one of twelve nationwide recipients of the Mitchell Scholarship. A graduate of FJ Reitz High School, he participated on the speech and debate team where he competed in foreign extemporaneous speaking.

Musgrave's writing and expertise has been featured in The New York Times, The Washington Post, Slate, Comparative Political Studies, American Politics Research, and PS: Political Science & Politics. Previously he served as an assistant editor at Foreign Affairs, the flagship publication of the Council on Foreign Relations. For three years, from 2006 to 2009, he served as a special assistant at the Richard Nixon Presidential Library. From 2015 to 2024 he was a faculty member at University of Massachusetts Amherst.
