= Chuck Bundrant =

American billionaire seafood tycoon (1942–2021)

- Born: Charles Hardin Bundrant; January 31, 1942; Lawrenceburg, Tennessee, U.S.
- Died: October 17, 2021 (aged 79); Edmonds, Washington, U.S.
- Education: North High School (Evansville)
- Alma mater: Middle Tennessee State University (dropped out)
- Occupation: Businessman
- Known for: Founder, chairman, and majority owner of Trident Seafoods
- Spouse: Diane Bundrant
- Children: 3

Charles Hardin Bundrant (January 31, 1942 – October 17, 2021) was an American billionaire businessman and the co-founder, chairman, and majority owner of Trident Seafoods. At his death, his net worth was estimated at US$1.3 billion.

== Early life ==
Charles Hardin Bundrant was born on January 31, 1942, in Lawrenceburg, Tennessee. He graduated from North High School, Evansville, Indiana, in 1960. He spent a short time at Middle Tennessee State University, before dropping out and moving to Alaska.

== Career ==
Bundrant owned 51% of the privately held Trident.

Bundrant Stadium at the Evansville, Indiana, North High School campus is named for him.

== Political activity ==
Together with his spouse, Bundrant contributed $50,000 to Donald Trump's 2020 presidential campaign.

== Personal life ==
Bundrant was married to Diane Bundrant. They had three children and lived in Seattle. His son, Joe Bundrant, has been CEO of Trident since 2013. In 2006, Bundrant was diagnosed with Parkinson's disease.

Bundrant died on October 17, 2021, in Edmonds, Washington.
