= Mark Cooper (artist) =

American multimedia artist

Mark Cooper (born 1950, Evansville, Indiana) is an American multimedia artist based in Boston, Massachusetts working in ceramics and sculptural installation as well as painting. He is best known for his large scale biomorphic fiberglass sculptures.

== Education ==
Cooper attended Harrison High School in Evansville, Indiana.

Cooper received his Bachelor of Science at Indiana University Bloomington in 1972, and his Masters of Fine Arts, from the School of the Museum of Fine Arts, Boston at Tufts University in 1980, Boston, Massachusetts.

== Career ==
Mark Cooper, yu yu tangerine, 2013

Cooper currently teaches ceramics at Boston College.

His paintings and sculptures made with fiberglass pieces, layered with rice paper, paint, silk-screens, and varying images and patterns, "explore dualities of culture and meaning." The Museum of Fine Arts, Boston, Boston College Museum, Capital Children's Museum in Washington, DC, DeCordova Museum and Sculpture Park, and the Whitney Museum of American Art at Philip Morris, New York, New York. He has received various public art commissions and grants from the Boston Medical Center, an Artist Fellowship Grant through the Massachusetts Cultural Council, and a Gund Travel Grant (Bali), and a special commission for the new Comme des Garçon store in New York City.

Recent exhibitions include: James and Audrey Foster Prize Finalists, Institute of Contemporary Art, Boston, Massachusetts (2013); New Blue and White, Foster Gallery, Curated by Emily Zilber Contemporary Decorative Arts, Museum of Fine Arts Boston, Massachusetts (2013); More is More, a solo exhibition at Samsøñ, Boston, Massachusetts. Most recently Cooper exhibited at the Seattle Art Fair in Seattle, Washington, with work representing a collaborative exchange with artists in Vietnam, China, Korea and Seattle. He was also a part of Seattle Art Fair's off-site exhibition at the Living Computer Museum, called A Singularity. Mark Cooper has been represented by Samsøñ since 2012.

== Articles ==
- The First Seattle Art Fair Attracts Local Tech Royalty
- Seattle Art Fair opens to more than 4,000 visitors
- "Mark Cooper - Reviews - Art in America". artinamericamagazine.com. January 7, 2012.
- "Art Galleries: What's on exhibit around Boston - Arts - The Boston Globe". bostonglobe.com.
- "Art review: 'New Blue and White' at the MFA - Arts - The Boston Globe". bostonglobe.com.
