= Oak Hill Cemetery (Evansville, Indiana) =

- U.S. National Register of Historic Places
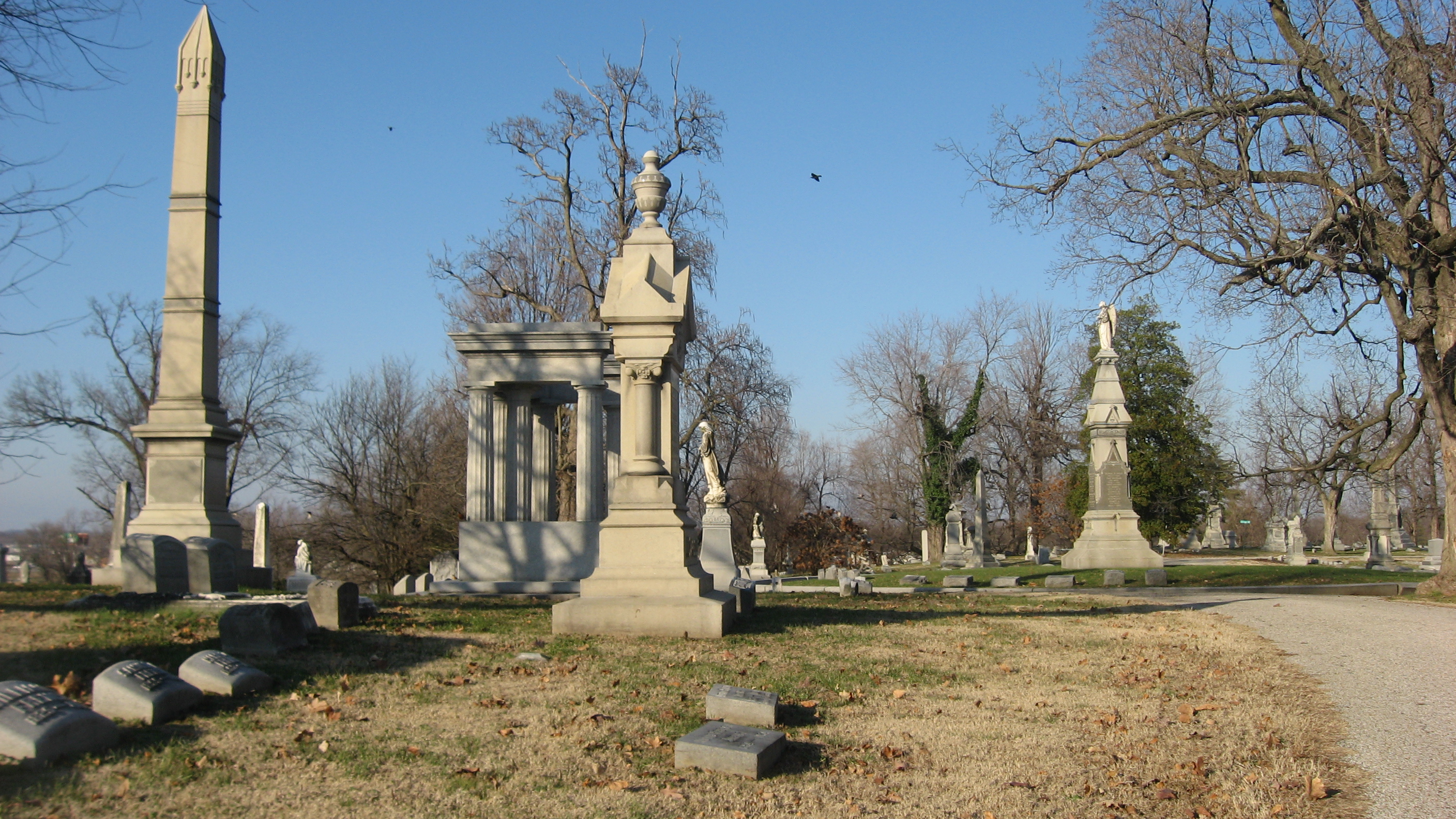
- Oak Hill Cemetery, December 2011
- Location: 1400 E. Virginia St., Evansville, Indiana
- Coordinates: 37°59′17″N 87°32′14″W
- Area: 110 acres (45 ha)
- Built: 1853
- Architects: Harris & Shopbell; Goodge, John S., et al
- Architectural style: Classical Revival, Bungalow/craftsman, et al.
- NRHP reference No.: 04000205
- Added to NRHP: March 22, 2004

Oak Hill Cemetery is a historic rural cemetery located at Evansville, Indiana. It was added to the National Register of Historic Places in 2004.

== History ==
Oak Hill Cemetery traces its roots to 12 August 1850, when the Evansville City Council appointed a committee to search for a new cemetery to replace the first public burying grounds located on the southeast edge of town at Mulberry and Fifth Streets. Within two years they selected a plot of land, then known as "Lost Hill," which was 56-acres of undeveloped land about a mile and half from the then city limits. By February 1853 lots were offered for sale.

By February 1853 lots were offered for sale and the cemetery saw its first burial, Ellen Johnson who died at age 2 on 18 February 1853, just 10 days after the City Council selected “Oak Hill” as the site's official name. Burials from the city's previous cemetery. Later land purchases (up until 1924) gave the Cemetery its present acreage.

The current appearance of the cemetery landscape — particularly its plantings – was primarily nurtured over an 80-year period (1853–1932) during the tenure of two superintendents. For the first four decades of the cemetery's existence (1853–1897), the beautification of the grounds was the responsibility of John S. Goodge. In his obituary (June 1897), he was credited with the "work of making the beautiful place the Oak Hill now is." Some of the more mature plantings are very likely the result of Goodge's endeavors. His successor, William Halbrook (1898–1932), brought to his position his knowledge and experience gained as a florist, and a large portion of Oak Hill's verdancy was the result of his handiwork. Since 1932, some planting has occurred, but not on the scale of the preceding 80 years.

== Design and landscape ==
The cemetery includes the French Renaissance style Administration Building (1899, 1917, 1999); Entry Gate (1901); and classical revival style Receiving Vault (1911) designed by Clifford Shopbell of Harris & Shopbell. The cemetery has a number of notable landscape features in keeping with the 19th century rural cemetery movement including a variety of tree species.

Bordering the site on its western side is Highway 41; on other sides are low-scale, modern-era residential and commercial neighborhoods. In spite of this encroachment, the cemetery has preserved its original pastoral tranquility. The site selected for the cemetery was, according to a contemporary newspaper account, a “hillock, a wilderness of underbrush and briars, and called at that with a mantle of loess, underlain by sandstone." A 1927 topographical map showing the cemetery tract depicted the land of the original 1852 purchase as gradually ascending on the south from the floodplain level of 390 feet to a height of 430 feet. On the north end, there was a sharp drop-off. In profile, as viewed particularly from the east, the contour of the hill looked like the back of a two-humped Bactrian camel with a central Erosional vale. The early burials took place on the southern slope, close to the ridge. Today, interment sites not only blanket the entire prominence, but also cover the flat lands at the foot of the hill on three sides. Although the Cemetery comprises 175 acres, less than 120 have been platted and made available for interments. A tract of about 55 acres across the northern part of the Cemetery bordering Morgan Avenue has been farm-leased.

An intricate tracery of crossing and curving pathways (now asphalted, one-lane drives) formed a lacy network which conjoined with the site's hill and vale topography and natural arborous properties created a picturesque setting for "the sleeping place of our dead," as one 19th century journalist characterized Oak Hill. The collection of trees comprised native Indiana and American specimens as well as ornamental exotics.

In addition to these distinctive plantings and walks, Oak Hill was enhanced by a number of other landscape features. The seclusion which characterizes this burial ground was furthered by the enclosure of its land on three sides by a brick wall and by a single entrance gate located on the south side of the Cemetery. The approach to the main gate was by a 365-foot-long drive which begun at Virginia Street and was bordered on each side by a continuation of the wall. The Mission Revival gateway was also designed by architects Harris and Shopbell in 1901. The overhanging hipped roof was clad with red barrel tiles, and the soffit was coffered. Extensions of the gateway are connected with the brick wall.

Within the cemetery there were two man-made bodies of water—reflecting pools. To the left of the gateway, in the Western Addition, the central attraction was an oblong lake fed by the city water system and containing a small island. Spaced upon the banks of the lake were temple-style mausoleums of stone erected by some of the city's most prominent citizens. The island, connected to the mainland by a stone bridge, was the interment area for the Johnson family whose patriarch, Edward Mead Johnson, founded Johnson & Johnson and later Mead Johnson Nutrition Company, and whose remains were also interred on the island. The round, colonnaded monument of granite was erected for Johnson in 1934. The other pool, also fed artificially, was situated directly behind the administration building and was part of the improvement program undertaken in 1899 which saw the construction of this primary building.

== Notable interments ==
The cemetery is now the resting place for countless notable Evansville residents, as well as an American Civil War burial ground with over 500 Union troops, 24 Confederate soldiers, and 94 civilians who died during Civil War conflicts. In 1868, the city began efforts to secure designation of the Union veterans’ areas as federal property, eventually succeeding with a Congressional appropriation and recognition in 1898. Several years later, in about 1903, the Fitzhugh Lee Chapter of the Daughters of the Confederacy erected a monument in remembrance of the 24 soldiers who died for the South. A larger memorial for local Union dead was added in 1909. The 24 Confederate soldiers buried here were prisoners of war who died in Evansville.

Records indicate the King and Queen of a tribe of Romany Gypsies are buried at the cemetery. Elizabeth Harrison, Queen of the Gypsies, died in November 1895 and her husband Isaac followed on Christmas Eve in 1900. Other notable interments include:

- Conrad Baker (1817–1885), 15th Governor of Indiana
- George Washington Buckner (1855–1943), physician and diplomat
- William Heilman (1824–1890), U.S. Representative
- Charles Harvey Denby (1830–1904), U.S. Union officer in the Civil War and diplomat
- John W. Foster (1836–1917), American diplomat and former U.S. Secretary of State
- Annie Fellows Johnston (1863–1931), American author of The Little Colonel series
- Edward Mead Johnson (1852–1934), American businessman and one of the co-founders of Johnson & Johnson and later Mead Johnson
- William E. Wilson (1870–1948), U.S. Representative
- Roger H. Zion (1921–2019) U.S. Representative
