= Francis Joseph Reitz =

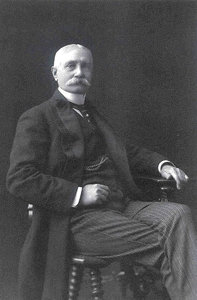
- Reitz, c. 1920's
- Born: July 7, 1841; Evansville, Indiana
- Died: December 11, 1930 (aged 89); Evansville, Indiana
- Occupation: Banking Administration
- Employer: National City Bank
- Known for: Business and Philanthropy
- Parent(s): John Augustus Reitz and Gertrude Frisse

Francis Joseph Reitz (1841–1930) was an American banker, civic leader, and philanthropist in Evansville, Indiana.
