= John Augustus Reitz =

- Born: December 17, 1815; Dorlar, Kingdom of Prussia
- Died: May 13, 1891 (aged 75); Evansville, Indiana
- Known for: Business and philanthropy
- Political party: Democrat
- Spouse: Gertrude Frisse (1820–1893)
- Children: Ten, including Francis Joseph Reitz

John A. Reitz (1815–1891), known as the "Lumber Baron," was an American entrepreneur, industrialist, banker, civic leader, and philanthropist in Evansville, Indiana. Using the wealth generated by his enterprises, he and his family created a lasting legacy of philanthropy in Evansville. Reitz gave millions of dollars to various charities, churches and educational organizations.

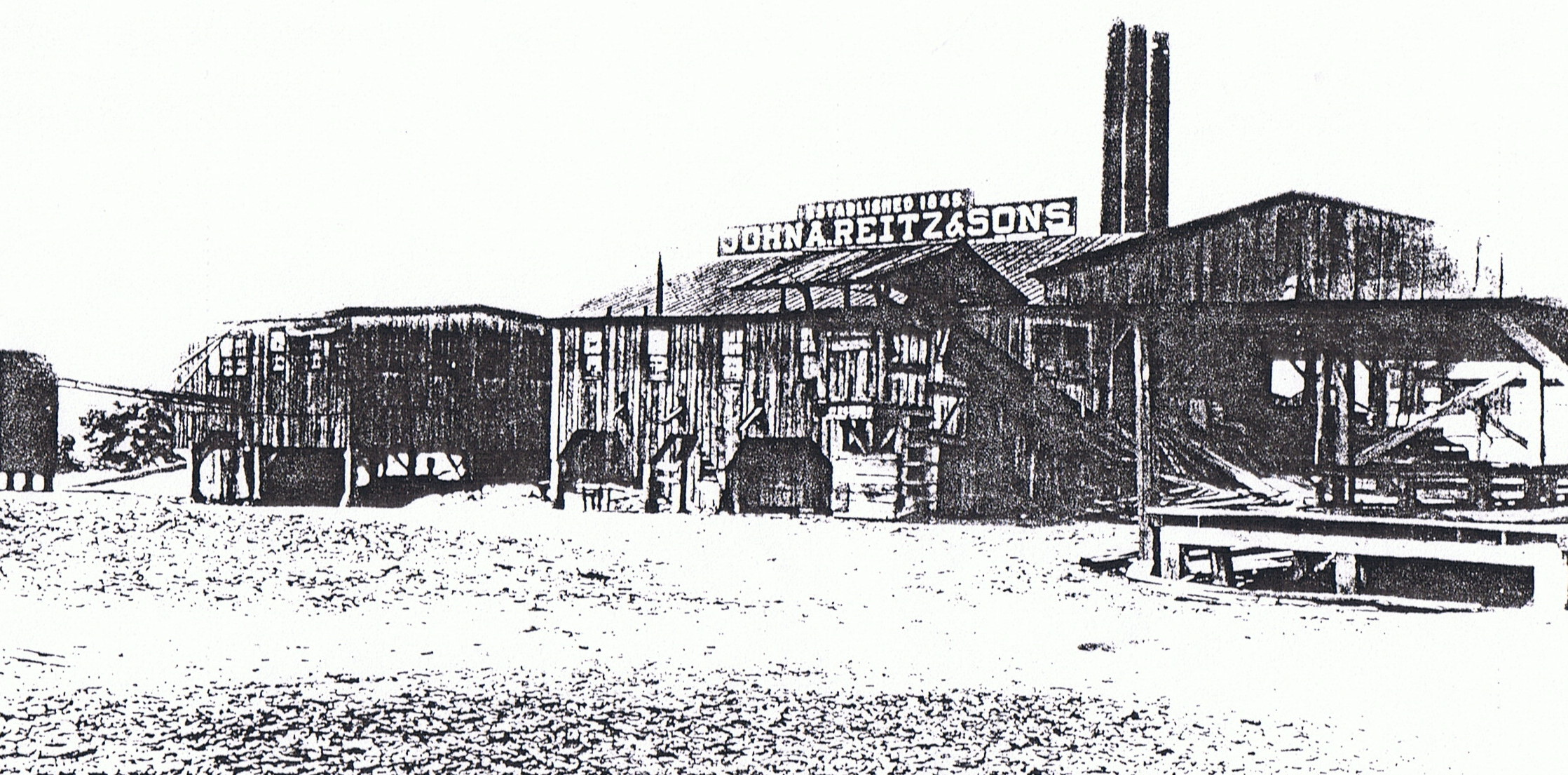
The Reitz family sawmill, which has since been razed

In 1856 Reitz opened his own sawmill on the banks of Pigeon Creek. It operated 22 out of 24 hours a day, six days a week.
