= Trident Seafoods =

Harvesting, processing, and distribution company

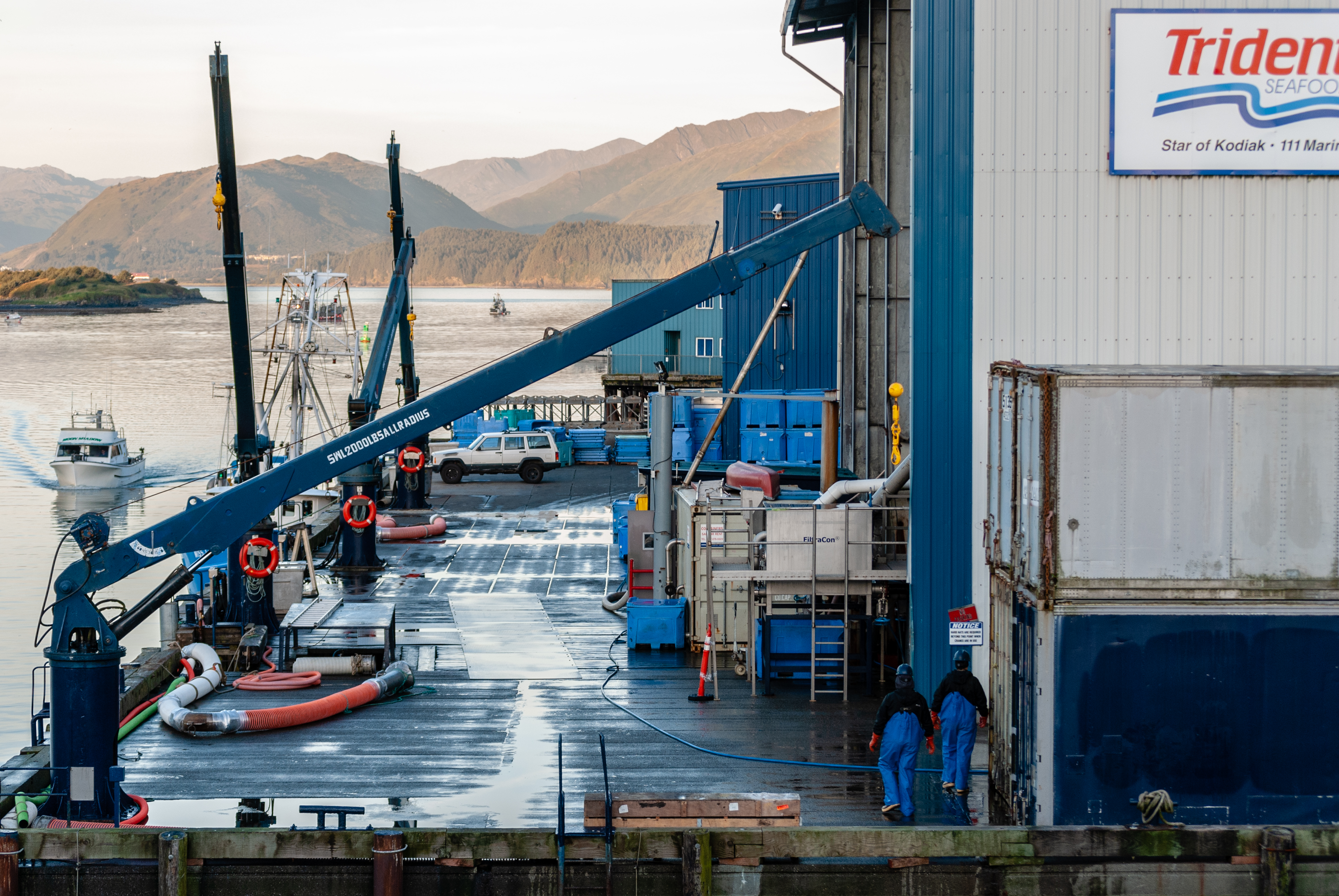
- Type: Private
- Industry: Fishery
- Founded: 1973
- Headquarters: Seattle, Washington
- Key people: Chuck Bundrant, Chairman and Founder; Kaare Ness, Founder; Joe Bundrant, Chief Executive Officer
- Products: Seafood
- Revenue: Unreported – privately– held company
- Number of employees: 9,000
- Website: tridentseafoods.com

Trident Seafoods is a seafood company in the United States, harvesting primarily wild-caught seafood in Alaska.

Trident manages a network of catcher and catcher processor vessels and processing plants across twelve coastal locations in Alaska. The company is headquartered in Seattle, Washington and has several processing plants, two shipyards, an R&D Innovation Center, and sales offices across the United States. The vertically integrated distributorship of its products is supported by global manufacturing and sales locations in Latin America, China, Japan, Germany, France, and the Netherlands. Trident sells frozen, canned, smoked and ready–to–eat seafood products for the wholesale, retail and food service markets under a variety of different brand names in over 55 countries.

== History ==
The company was founded in 1973 by Chuck Bundrant. In 1986, it merged with ConAgra's Northwest Pacific seafood unit, retaining the Trident name, and with ConAgra holding a 45% stake in the new company. In 1995, ConAgra sold most of its interest to Trident's original private owners.

The company has made numerous other acquisitions, including:

- ConAgra (1986 – see above). Along with the merger came ConAgra's Sea Alaska and Lily brands.
- Farwest Fisheries (1992), along with its Faust, Prelate, Rubinstein's, Tulip, and Whitney canned seafood (primarily salmon) brands.
- Sealegs surimi brand (1999) from Nichirei Foods.
- Tyson Seafood Group (1999), along with its Arctic Ice and Pubhouse frozen seafood brands.
- NorQuest Seafoods (2004), along with its Norquest, Silver Lining and Portlock brands of frozen, canned and smoked salmon.
- Royal, Pride and Sno Tip canned salmon brands (2004) from North Pacific Processors]
- ConAgra seafood brands (2006), including Louis Kemp (surimi) and Captain Jac.
- Bear & Wolf Salmon Co. (2008), producer of skinless and boneless canned salmon.
- Kasilof Fish Co. (2010), producer of smoked salmon products.

=== Key people ===
- Joseph L. Bundrant, Chief Executive Officer
- Jessica McNeil–Clapp, Executive Assistant – Chief Executive Officer
- Bob Masching, EVP – Supply Chain
- Erik Anderson, EVP – General Counsel
- Stephanie Moreland, EVP – Public Affairs
- John Score, Chief People Officer
- Terrence Sabol, Chief Financial Officer

=== Exxon Valdez oil spill settlement ===
In 1991, Trident Seafoods and six other Seattle– based fish processors finalized a deal with Exxon over damages from the 1989 Exxon Valdez oil spill in Prince William Sound, Alaska. The agreement between Exxon and the so– called Seattle Seven came to light when Anchorage– based attorney David W. Oesting, the lead plaintiffs' counsel in Exxon Shipping Company, et al. v. Baker, Grant, et al., submitted a preliminary " 'Plan of Allocation' or Damage Matrix" to federal judge H. Russel Holland in February 1997.

The Seattle Seven responded by filing suit against Oesting and other plaintiffs' attorneys. In court it was revealed that the processors had accepted a settlement of between 63.75 and 76 million dollars from Exxon for agreeing to return to Exxon their share of any punitive damages awarded by the court. The processors "agreed to be Exxon's front" in recovering punitive damages and Exxon agreed to pay their ongoing legal fees. Judge Holland accused Exxon of acting as "Jekyll and Hyde ... behaving laudably in public and deplorably in private." Even though they had already settled with Exxon, the Seattle Seven filed $745 million in punitive damage claims to be given back to Exxon. Judge Holland voided the agreement and said that neither Exxon nor the seafood processors would share in the punitive damages.

However, in 2000, a three– judge panel of the Ninth Circuit Court of Appeals overturned Holland's decision and reinstated the agreement. The appeals court ruled that Judge Holland had abused his discretion and characterized the settlement as "an innovative way to encourage settlements in large class-action cases" that was "in the public interest."

== Environmental record ==
In 2011, as part of a consent decree (United States of America v. Trident Seafoods Corporation, Civil Action No. 11-1616), Trident Seafoods agreed to pay $2.5 million to resolve alleged Clean Water Act violations, and to invest more than $30 million to build a fish meal plant at a Naknek salmon plant and reduce discharges at Akutan and three other plants. Dennis McLerran, then the Environmental Protection Agency (EPA) regional administrator in Seattle, called the settlement a “game changer” that would be better for the environment as well as Trident’s bottom line". In February 2019, Trident Seafoods agreed to spend up to $23 million to fix "air pollution issues with its vessels and land-based facilities." The company was fined $900,000 by the EPA for violating the Clean Air Act.

== Philanthropy ==
The privately held company does not disclose the extent of its corporate responsibility and charitable giving initiatives saying only that it focuses on the areas of Environment, Youth and Family, Hunger Relief, and Disease Prevention and Management.

However, it is known that the company has given donations to the victims of the huge earthquake that hit Japan in 2011. Groups who assisted the victims of hurricane Katrina and superstorm Sandy were also supported by Trident. The company supported Ukrainian employees during the Russo-Ukrainian war. A Bundrant Stadium was also built in his high school alma mater in Evansville as well as a Bundrant Media Center. The company is a partner with SeaShare, donating food and meals to several food banks.

== See also ==
- SS Albert M. Boe: The final Liberty ship to be constructed, converted into a floating cannery in 1965 and is now permanently part of Trident's processing facilities in Kodiak, Alaska, under the name "Star of Kodiak".
