= The Little Colonel (1935 film) =

1935 film by David Butler

- Theatrical release poster
- Directed by: David Butler
- Written by: William Conselman
- Based on: The Little Colonel by Annie Fellows Johnston
- Produced by: Buddy G. DeSylva
- Starring: Shirley Temple; Lionel Barrymore; Evelyn Venable; John Lodge; Bill Robinson; Hattie McDaniel
- Cinematography: Arthur Miller
- Music by: Cyril J. Mockridge
- Color process: black & white & Technicolor (one sequence)
- Production company: Fox Film
- Distributed by: Fox Film
- Release date: February 22, 1935
- Running time: 80 minutes
- Country: United States
- Language: English
- Box office: $1.2 million

The Little Colonel is a 1935 American musical comedy drama film directed by David Butler. The screenplay by William Conselman was adapted from the children's novel of the same name by Annie Fellows Johnston, originally published in 1895. It focuses on the reconciliation of an estranged father and daughter in the years following the American Civil War. The film stars Shirley Temple, Lionel Barrymore, Evelyn Venable, John Lodge, Bill Robinson, and Hattie McDaniel.

== Cast ==
- Shirley Temple as Lloyd Sherman
- Lionel Barrymore as Colonel Lloyd
- Evelyn Venable as Elizabeth Lloyd Sherman
- John Lodge as Jack Sherman
- Bill Robinson as Walker
- Sidney Blackmer as Swazey
- Stephen Chase (credited as Alden Chase) as Hull
- William Burress as Dr. Scott
- Frank Darien as Nebler, who delivers a telegram
- Robert Warwick as Colonel Gray
- Hattie McDaniel as Becky "Mom Beck" Porter
- Geneva Williams as Maria
- Avonnie Jackson as May Lily
- Nyanza Potts as Henry Clay
- Lucille Ward as Aunt Sally Tyler (uncredited)
- Charles C. Wilson as Jeremy Higgins, of the Union Pacific Railroad (uncredited)

== Production ==
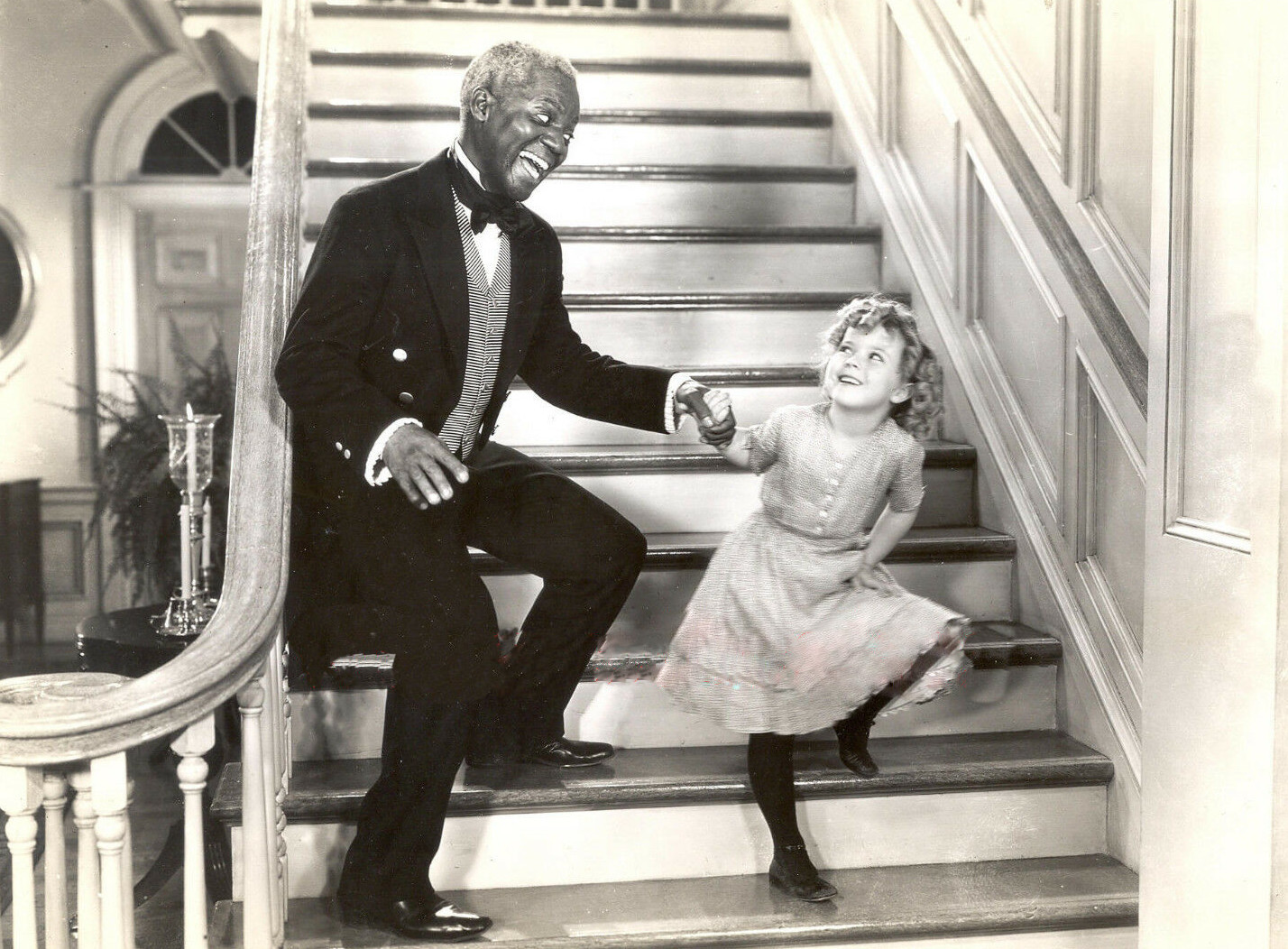
Temple and Robinson in the staircase tap dance

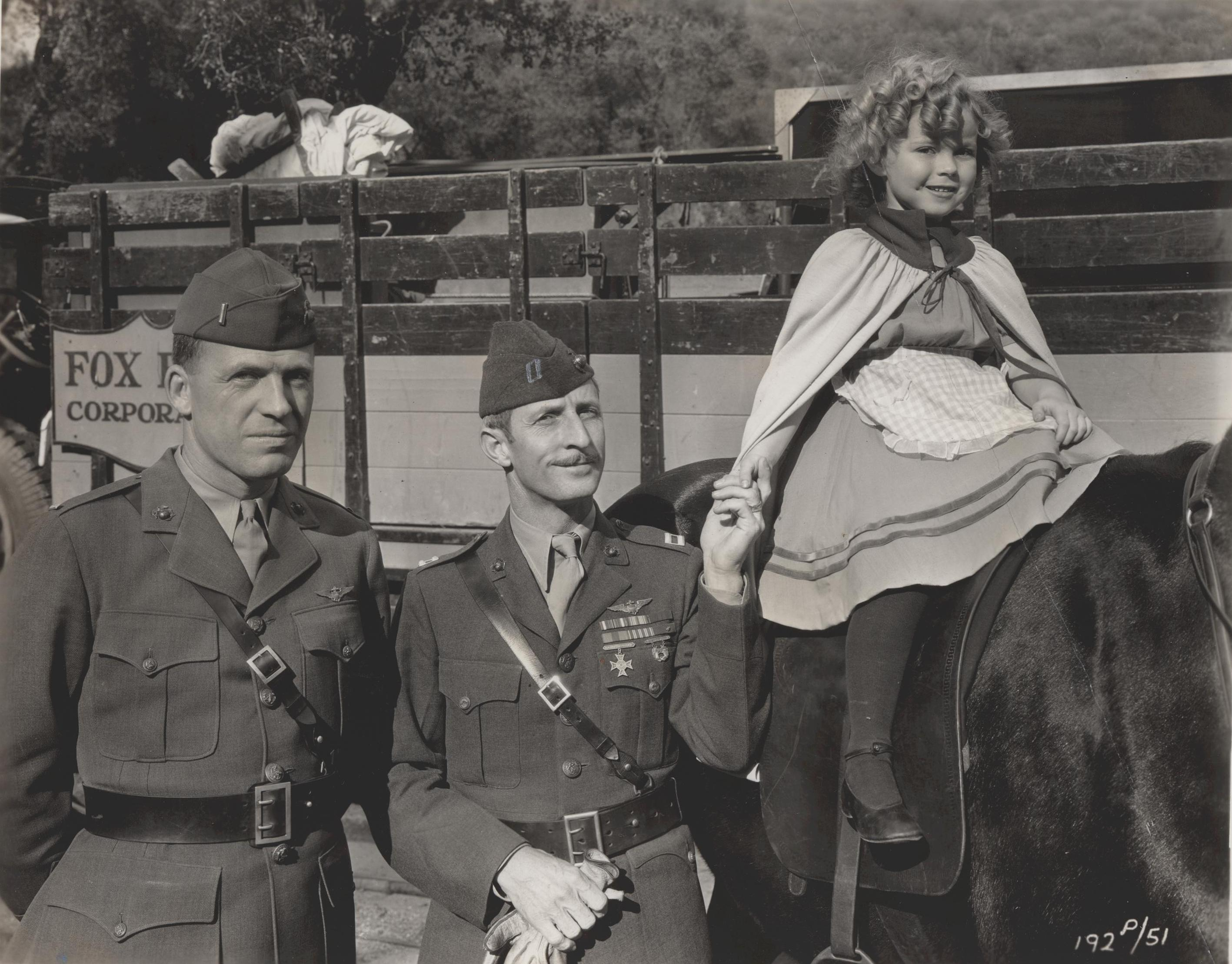
Shirley Temple with U.S. Marines on the set of The Little Colonel (1935)

The Little Colonel is best known for the famous staircase tap dance between Robinson and Temple. It was the first interracial dance pairing in a Hollywood film, and was so controversial that the scene was removed from prints screened in the Southern United States. The idea was actually first proposed by Fox head Winfield Sheehan after a discussion with D. W. Griffith. Sheehan set his sights on Robinson, but, unsure of his ability as an actor, arranged for a contract that would be voided if Robinson failed the dramatic test. Robinson passed the test, and was brought in to star with Temple and teach her tap dancing. They quickly hit it off, as Temple recounted years later:

Robinson walked a step ahead of us, but when he noticed me hurrying to catch up, he shortened his stride to accommodate mine. I kept reaching up for his hand, but he hadn't looked down and seemed unaware. Fannie called his attention to what I was doing, so he stopped short, bent low over me, his eyes wide and rows of brilliant teeth showing in a wide smile. When he took my hand in his, it felt large and cool. For a few moments, we continued walking in silence. "Can I call you Uncle Billy?" I asked. "Why sure you can," he replied... "But then I get to call you darlin′." It was a deal. From then on, whenever we walked together it was hand in hand, and I was always his "darlin′."

During filming, Temple drew the ire of veteran actor Lionel Barrymore when she prompted him for one of his lines after he forgot it, causing him to storm off in a fit of anger. Temple was sent off to apologize to Barrymore, but, instead of directly apologizing, told him she thought he was the best actor in the world and asked for his autograph, defusing the situation and bringing Barrymore back to the set.

The final scene of the film is in Technicolor. The color process available at the time required actors to wear heavy red-hued makeup, so the scene is the only time Temple wore makeup on the set of her Fox films.

== Release ==
For screenings in Southern states, Fox removed the staircase scene where Temple and Robinson touch hands.

The film has been released on VHS and DVD, including versions with colorization, theatrical trailers, and other special features.

== Critical response ==
VHS cover

In his review in the March 22, 1935, edition of The New York Times, Andre Sennwald found The Little Colonel "All adrip with magnolia whimsy and vast, unashamed portions of synthetic Dixie atmosphere". He further wrote that the film was "so ruthless in its exploitation of Miss Temple's great talent for infant charm that it seldom succeeds in being properly lively and gay", and finished his review by noting that the audience applauded for eleven seconds after the final fade-out, and (perhaps sardonically) that the film "ought to bring out the best in every one who sees it".

== See also ==
- Shirley Temple filmography
- Lionel Barrymore filmography
- List of early color feature films
- List of films and television shows about the American Civil War
