= Annie Fellows Johnston =

American novelist (1863–1931)

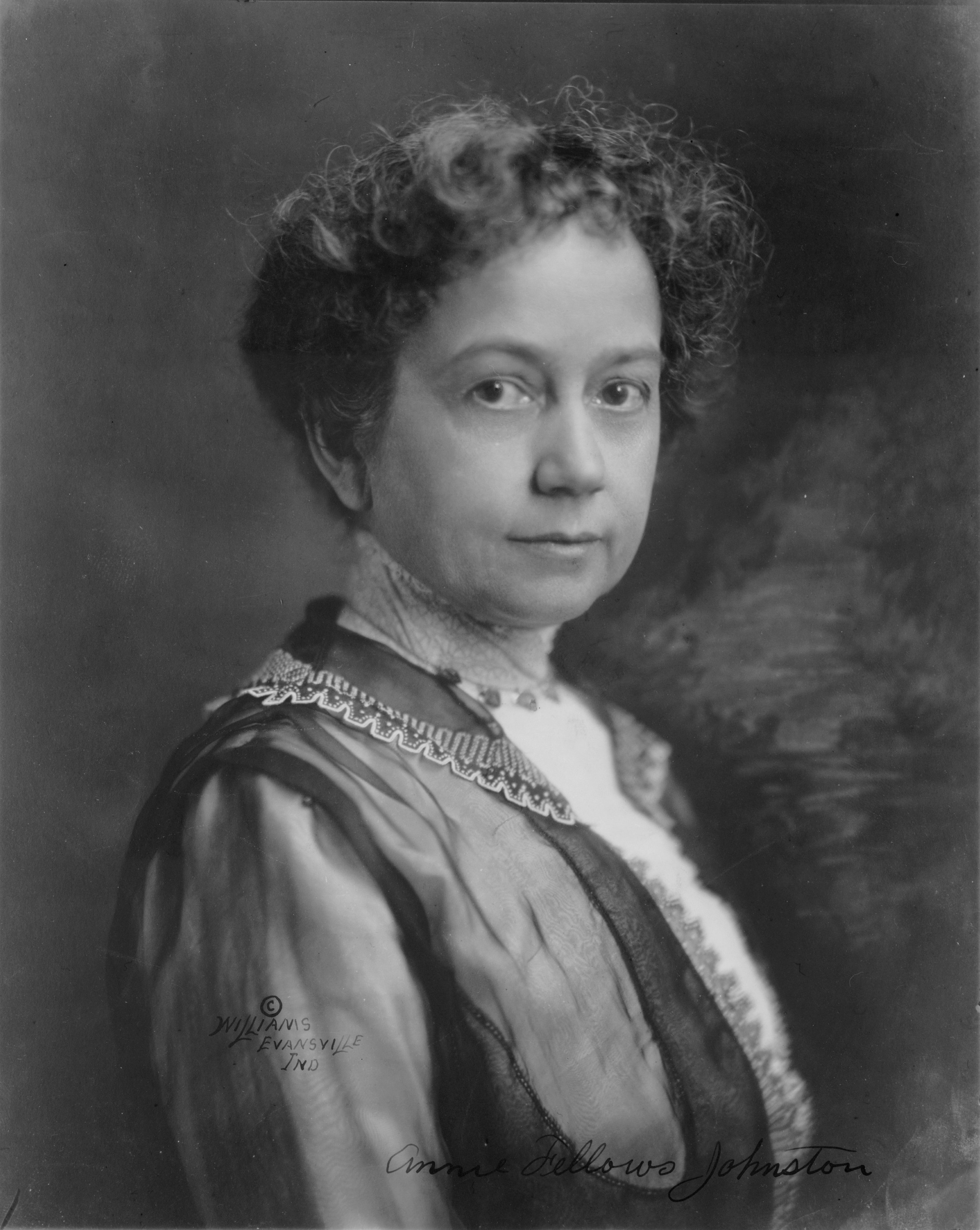
- Born: Annie Julia Fellows; May 15, 1863; McCutchanville, Indiana, U.S.
- Died: October 5, 1931 (aged 68); Pewee Valley, Kentucky, U.S.
- Education: University of Iowa
- Occupation: Author
- Spouse: William Levi Johnston
- Parent(s): Albion Fellows; Mary Erskine Fellows
- Writing career
- Genre: Children's literature

Annie Fellows Johnston (May 15, 1863 – October 5, 1931) was an American author of children's fiction. She wrote the popular The Little Colonel series, which was the basis for the 1935 Shirley Temple film The Little Colonel; many of the books were illustrated by photographer Kate Matthews. She was born and grew up in McCutchanville, Indiana, a small unincorporated town near Evansville, Indiana.

== Biography ==
Johnston was born Annie Julia Fellows on May 15, 1863, the daughter of Albion Fellows, a Methodist minister at Trinity, and Mary Erskine Fellows. She had a brother, Erwin, and two sisters, Lura and Albion. She attended the University of Iowa for one year, returned to Evansville, taught school for three years, then became a private secretary. She married a cousin, William Levi Johnston. He was a widower with three children, Rena, John, and Mary. Rena died in 1899 and John in 1910 or 1911.

Johnston moved to Pewee Valley in 1898, the move becoming permanent in 1911. There, she lived until her death at "The Beeches" with her stepdaughter, artist Mary Gardener Johnston. The Beeches was built in 1901 by "Mamie" Craig Lawton, widow of Gen. Henry Ware Lawton, who was the only general killed during the Spanish–American War. Members of the Craig family inspired 12 characters in the "Little Colonel" stories.

Annie Fellows Johnston died at her home in Pewee Valley on October 5, 1931.

The Little Colonel series was her 13-book collection beginning with The Little Colonel (1895). It was made into a movie starring Shirley Temple in 1935 featuring Lionel Barrymore and "Bojangles" Robinson.

An assessment of her achievements in connection with her induction into the Kentucky Writers Hall of Fame says, "Her work is now considered anachronistic, depicting Reconstruction Era South still transitioning from the Civil War, and must be taken in the context of the times..."

== Works ==
The Little Colonel's Christmas Vacation

- Big Brother (1893)
- Joel, a boy of Galilee (1895)
- The Little Colonel (1895)
- In League with Israel: a Tale of the Chattanooga Conference (1896)
- Ole Mammy's Torment (1897)
- The Gate of the Giant Scissors (1898)
- Two Little Knights of Kentucky (1899)
- The Little Colonel's House Party (1900)
- The Little Colonel's Holiday (1901)
- The Little Colonel's Hero (1902)
- The Little Colonel at Boarding School (1904)
- The Little Colonel in Arizona (1904)
- In The Desert of Waiting (1905)
- The Little Colonel's Christmas Vacation (1905)
- The Three Weavers (1905)
- The Little Colonel: Maid of Honor (1906)
- Travelers Five (1911)
- Legend of the Bleeding Heart (1907)
- Little Colonel's Knight Comes Riding (1907)
- The Little Colonel's Chum: Mary Ware (1908)
- The Rescue of the Princess Winsome (1908)
- Mary Ware in Texas (1910)
- Mary Ware's Promised Land (1912)
- Miss Santa Claus of the Pullman (1913)
- Georgina of the Rainbows (1916)
- Georgina's Service Stars (1918)
