= List of United States tornadoes in March 2023 =

Lists of all tornadoes that happens in March 2023

United States tornadoes in March 2023
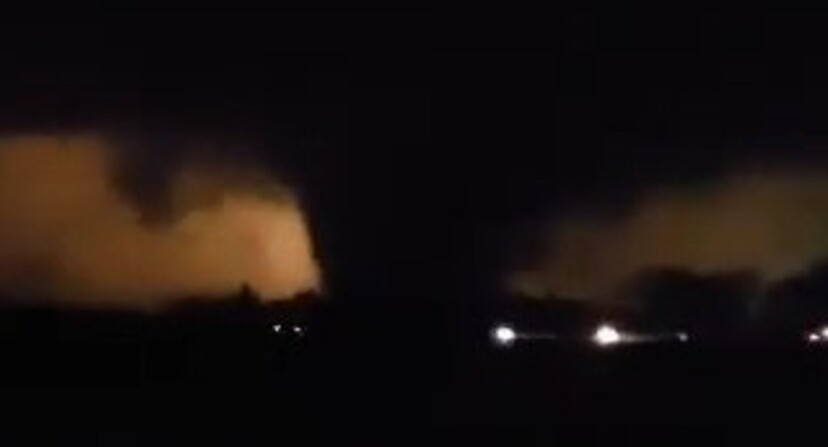
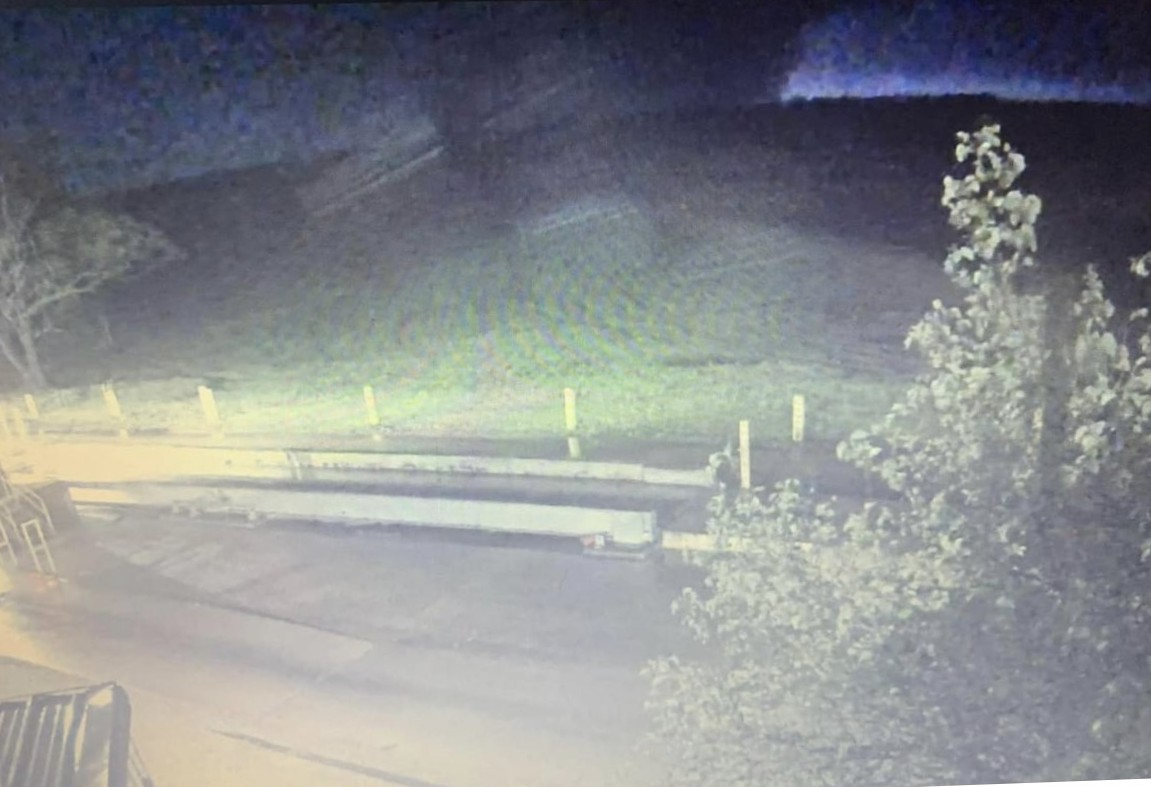
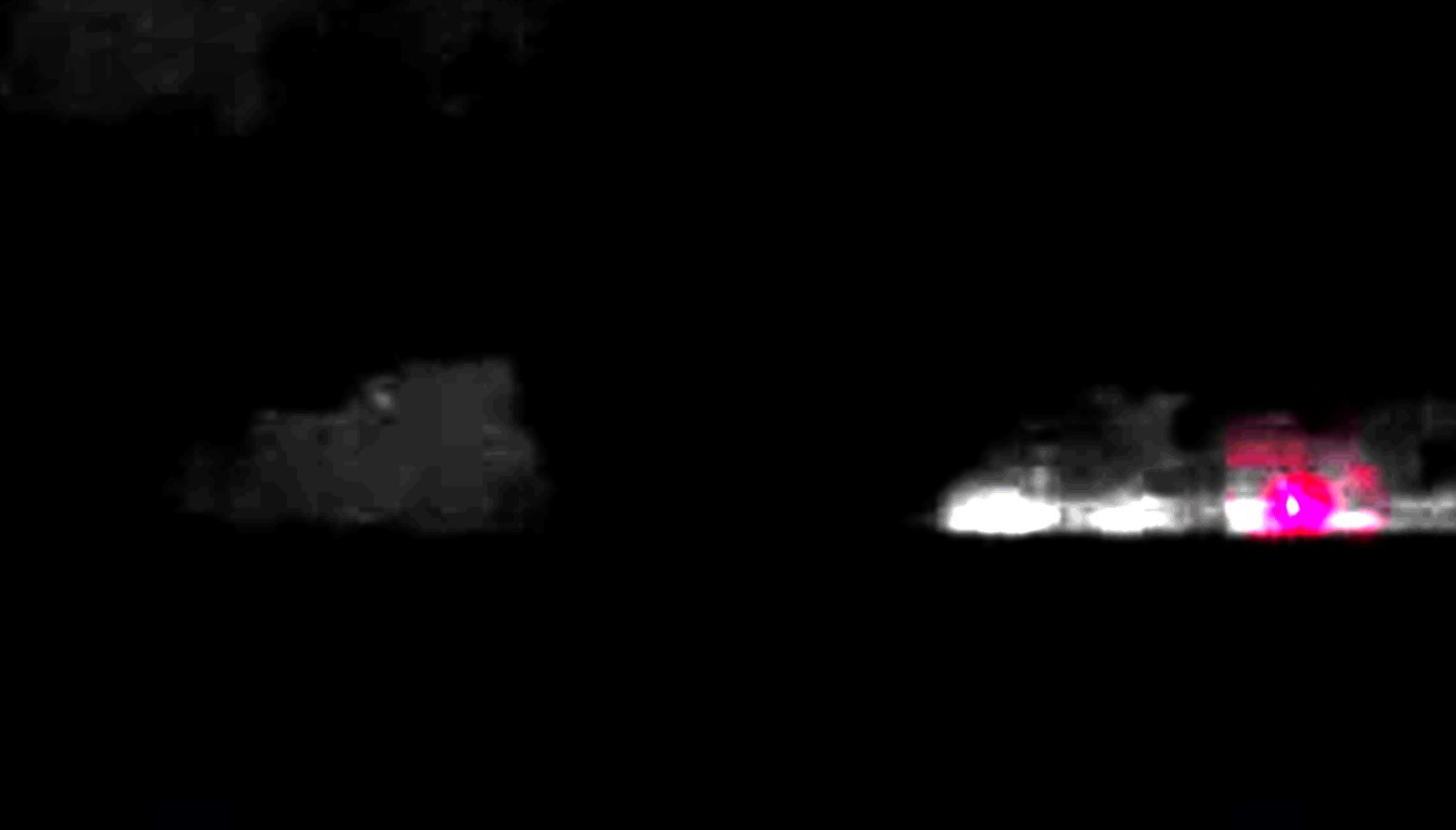
- Clockwise from top: An EF3 tornado near Robinson, Illinois on March 31; A deadly EF3 tornado near Bethel Springs, Tennessee on March 31; an EF3 tornado approaching Amory, Mississippi on March 24
- Timespan: March 1–31
- Maximum rated tornado: EF4 tornado: Rolling Fork, Mississippi on March 24; Keota, Iowa on March 31
- Tornadoes: 198
- Fatalities: 46
- Injuries: 448

This page documents all tornadoes confirmed by various weather forecast offices of the National Weather Service in the United States for March 2023. Tornado counts are considered preliminary until final publication in the database of the National Centers for Environmental Information. Based on the 1991–2020 average, about 80 tornadoes are recorded in March. These tornadoes are commonly focused across the Southern United States due to their proximity to the unstable airmass and warm waters of the Gulf of Mexico, as well as California in association with winter storms, although with the arrival of springtime the activity begins to shift northward especially later in the month.

After a moderately active start to the month, the middle portion of March was quiet in terms of tornadic activity. However, activity increased dramatically late in the month with two major outbreaks, each of which produced a violent tornado and many strong tornadoes. This was the fifth and final consecutive year to include a violent tornado in March, tying the record longest streak of five from 1963 to 1967. The outbreak on the last day of March, which continued into April 1, was especially large with 116 tornadoes, which represented just over 60% of the tornadoes from the entire month. March finished significantly above average as a result, with 197 confirmed tornadoes, making it the fourth most active March on record (behind 2026, 2022 and 2025). There were also 46 tornadic fatalities during the month, which was double the number of tornadic fatalities that occurred throughout all of 2022.

== March ==
Confirmed tornadoes by Enhanced Fujita rating
EFU	EF0	EF1	EF2	EF3	EF4	EF5	Total
10	55	85	34	12	2	0	198

=== March 1 event ===
List of confirmed tornadoes – Wednesday, March 1, 2023 (Note: All dates are based on the local time zone where the tornado touched down; however, all times are in Coordinated Universal Time for consistency.)
EF#	Location	County / parish	State	Start coord.	Time (UTC)	Path length	Max. width
EF1	Shottsville to SW of Pigeye	Marion	AL	34.2608°N 88.1254°W	03:54–04:07	10.1 mi (16.3 km)	500 yd (460 m)
EF1	This tornado touched down in Shottsville where a church sustained exterior damage. Elsewhere, a home sustained damage to its metal roof and numerous trees were snapped or uprooted, one of which fell on a barn.						
EF1	NE of Hazel Green	Madison	AL	34.9504°N 86.5074°W	04:32–04:33	0.14 mi (0.23 km)	25 yd (23 m)
EF1	A very brief and narrow high-end EF1 tornado damaged the roofs of several homes in a subdivision to the northeast of Hazel Green, including one home that had a large portion of its attached garage roof removed, causing a wall to blow out. A pickup truck was tipped over onto its side and a small portion of a fence was knocked down as well.						

=== March 2 event ===
List of confirmed tornadoes – Thursday, March 2, 2023
EF#	Location	County / parish	State	Start coord.	Time (UTC)	Path length	Max. width
EF0	W of Signal Mountain	Marion	TN	35.1014°N 85.4777°W	12:16–12:17	0.26 mi (0.42 km)	100 yd (91 m)
EF0	A brief tornado downed a swath of trees in Prentice Cooper State Forest.						
EF0	W of Georgetown	Hamilton, Meigs	TN	35.288°N 84.9925°W	11:55–11:59	2.21 mi (3.56 km)	100 yd (91 m)
EF0	Homes sustained minor damage, a barn lost its roof, and trees and power lines were downed.						
EF1	Pickton	Hopkins	TX	32.9816°N 95.4209°W	21:20–21:28	8.15 mi (13.12 km)	75 yd (69 m)
EF1	This narrow high-end EF1 tornado caused considerable damage as it moved directly through Pickton, inflicting roof damage to several homes, businesses, and a church. Trees were damaged along the path as well.						
EF0	N of Mount Vernon	Franklin	TX	33.2837°N 95.2662°W	23:00–23:11	5.43 mi (8.74 km)	100 yd (91 m)
EF0	Several tree limbs were downed.						
EF1	WNW of Jefferson	Marion	TX	32.7662°N 94.4203°W	23:05–23:10	3.25 mi (5.23 km)	400 yd (370 m)
EF1	A few outbuildings were damaged or destroyed. Several trees were snapped or uprooted, some of which caused damage to homes and other structures upon falling.						
EF1	NW of McLeod	Cass	TX	32.9747°N 94.1211°W	23:34–23:35	1.22 mi (1.96 km)	475 yd (434 m)
EF1	Many trees were snapped or downed, some of which caused damage to homes and other structures upon falling. A few outbuildings were damaged as well.						
EF1	Southeastern Shreveport	Caddo	LA	32.3627°N 93.7087°W	23:35–23:40	4.76 mi (7.66 km)	100 yd (91 m)
EF1	An EF1 tornado moved through southeastern sections of Shreveport, touching down and lifting several times along an intermittent path. In all, 98 homes sustained damage to their roofs, windows, and chimneys, including one home that had a large section of its roof torn off. Four businesses were also damaged and an apartment building sustained minor damage as well. Additional damage occurred to light poles, signs, fences, trampolines, and basketball hoops. Numerous trees were snapped or uprooted, including on the campus of Louisiana State University Shreveport. Two people sustained minor injuries in a vehicle. Damage totaled $50 million.						
EF1	WSW of Fouke	Miller	AR	33.2277°N 93.9945°W	23:58–00:02	1.82 mi (2.93 km)	475 yd (434 m)
EF1	A high-end EF1 tornado occurred near the Sulphur River Wildlife Management Area, damaging or destroying several outbuildings. Additional homes and other structures were also damaged, mainly from downed tree limbs and trees.						
EF1	NW of Broken Bow	McCurtain	OK	34.0342°N 94.8123°W	03:05–03:11	4.85 mi (7.81 km)	390 yd (360 m)
EF1	Trees were uprooted, some of which caused structural damage upon falling.						
EF2	NNE of Kirby	Pike	AR	34.2542°N 93.6426°W	04:50–04:53	1.8 mi (2.9 km)	300 yd (270 m)
EF2	This high-end EF2 tornado completely destroyed two chicken houses at the beginning of its path. Elsewhere, a frame home had part of its roof torn off and a tied-down mobile home was destroyed after being lofted and tossed 100 ft (30 m) into a wooded area. Many large trees were snapped or uprooted along the path, one of which landed on and destroyed a mobile home. A few other mobile homes were also damaged, one of which was shifted off its foundation blocks. A house sustained minor damage from falling trees shortly before the tornado dissipated. Five people were injured.						
EF1	N of Appleby	Nacogdoches	TX	31.7226°N 94.6396°W	04:51–04:58	3.09 mi (4.97 km)	1,000 yd (910 m)
EF1	Large trees were snapped or uprooted along the path of this large tornado.						

=== March 3 event ===
List of confirmed tornadoes – Friday, March 3, 2023
EF#	Location	County / parish	State	Start coord.	Time (UTC)	Path length	Max. width
EF0	E of Fryeburg	Bienville	LA	32.4124°N 93.2224°W	06:38–06:40	2.4 mi (3.9 km)	50 yd (46 m)
EF0	A high-end EF0 tornado embedded with a larger area of damaging straight-line winds damaged the roof of a manufactured home and snapped or uprooted trees.						
EF0	NW of Carthage to SE of Leola	Dallas	AR	34.0892°N 92.6149°W	06:43-06:47	4.3 mi (6.9 km)	100 yd (91 m)
EF0	A weak tornado broke limbs and downed pine trees.						
EF0	E of Altheimer	Jefferson	AR	34.3046°N 91.7699°W	07:57–07:58	0.7 mi (1.1 km)	50 yd (46 m)
EF0	Trees were damaged by this brief, weak tornado.						
EF1	SE of Kirkville	Itawamba	MS	34.3987°N 88.3913°W	15:30–15:33	2.27 mi (3.65 km)	125 yd (114 m)
EF1	This tornado caused significant damage to pine trees. Three houses and an outbuilding sustained roof damage and numerous metal roof panels were tossed into nearby trees.						
EF2	S of Hendron	McCracken	KY	36.95°N 88.61°W	17:08–17:10	1.49 mi (2.40 km)	175 yd (160 m)
EF2	A strong tornado struck the small community of Fremont, causing significant damage. Multiple homes were damaged and a few had their roofs torn off, one of which sustained some exterior wall loss as well. A large garage structure was heavily damaged along with a church housed in an old school building. Numerous trees and power poles were snapped, multiple outbuildings were completely destroyed, debris was scattered across the ground, and a couple of businesses sustained roof and exterior damage.						
EF1	SE of Sturgis	Union	KY	37.52°N 87.96°W	18:00–18:06	6.73 mi (10.83 km)	100 yd (91 m)
EF1	Three separate, large barns were severely damaged. Several trees were snapped or uprooted and dozens of tree limbs were also downed.						
EF1	SE of Old Shawneetown, IL	Union	KY	37.66°N 88.11°W	18:02–18:03	1.76 mi (2.83 km)	100 yd (91 m)
EF1	A couple of homes sustained minor roof and fascia damage. Parts of roofing and fascia were also ripped from a small convenience store. Additionally, part of the roof was torn off a large outbuilding. Several trees were snapped or damaged.						
EF0	E of Old Shawneetown, IL	Union	KY	37.69°N 88.06°W	18:04–18:08	3.62 mi (5.83 km)	25 yd (23 m)
EF0	Large tree limbs were downed.						
EF1	W of Smith Mills	Henderson	KY	37.77°N 87.78°W	18:17–18:19	2.14 mi (3.44 km)	125 yd (114 m)
EF1	A metal farm outbuilding was destroyed and several trees suffered extensive limb damage.						
EF1	NW of Kasson to Saint Joseph	Vanderburgh	IN	38.03°N 87.65°W	18:38–18:40	2.76 mi (4.44 km)	100 yd (91 m)
EF1	A tornado caused generally minor damage to the roofs and fascia of homes in and around Saint Joseph; however, the roof was completely ripped off of Saint Joseph Catholic Church. Dozens of trees were snapped, uprooted, or had broken limbs as well.						
EF1	Northern Section to N of Dutton	Jackson	AL	34.5891°N 85.9949°W	18:39–18:43	5.04 mi (8.11 km)	105 yd (96 m)
EF1	This tornado touched down in Section and moved to the northeast. A manufactured home was overturned while other manufactured homes suffered damaged to their underpinnings and roofs. A home sustained minor damage, metal roofing was removed from a chicken house, many power lines were downed, and trees were snapped or uprooted as well.						
EF0	N of Darmstadt to S of Stacer	Vanderburgh	IN	38.12°N 87.58°W	18:45–18:47	2.14 mi (3.44 km)	50 yd (46 m)
EF0	A few homes sustained roof and fascia damage. Several large tree limbs were downed.						
EF1	Southeastern Pisgah to W of Rosalie	Jackson	AL	34.6785°N 85.8392°W	18:47–18:50	3.17 mi (5.10 km)	50 yd (46 m)
EF1	This brief tornado formed shortly after the EF1 Section tornado dissipated, touching down at the southeast edge of Pisgah. It uprooted several trees and inflicted minor roof damage to chicken houses before dissipating.						
EF1	E of Dale to NNE of Johnsburg	Spencer, Dubois	IN	38.17°N 86.97°W	19:07–19:15	5.25 mi (8.45 km)	100 yd (91 m)
EF1	A large barn had about half its roof ripped off. A couple of houses sustained roof and fascia damage, including one that had multiple windows blown out as well, while a nearby TV antenna on the property was bent at its base. A semi-trailer was overturned on I-64 and a metal farm building was damaged. Several large trees were snapped, uprooted, or had their limbs downed.						
EF1	Northern Duff to Northwestern Jasper	Dubois	IN	38.329°N 87.027°W	19:11–19:18	7.3 mi (11.7 km)	400 yd (370 m)
EF1	This tornado first touched down at the north edge of the small community of Duff. Multiple homes sustained minor roof and siding damage while barns were heavily damaged or destroyed, including one barn that was left with only one wall standing. Further to the northeast, many trees were snapped or uprooted in the northwestern part of Jasper before the tornado dissipated.						
EF1	N of Sonoraville	Gordon	GA	34.4595°N 84.8336°W	20:08–20:12	3.69 mi (5.94 km)	150 yd (140 m)
EF1	An outbuilding was destroyed, a barn was largely destroyed, and numerous trees were snapped or uprooted. Several power lines were snapped as well.						
EF1	S of Kent	Jefferson	IN	38.703°N 85.557°W	20:29–20:31	1.66 mi (2.67 km)	120 yd (110 m)
EF1	A tornado snapped, uprooted, or twisted numerous trees west of Hanover. Six outbuildings and older barns were significantly damaged or destroyed. A brick home sustained severe roof damage, had windows blown out, and had its TV antenna snapped as well.						
EF0	W of Bethel	Clermont	OH	38.9590°N 84.1280°W	22:05–22:07	1.29 mi (2.08 km)	200 yd (180 m)
EF0	Numerous homes and outbuildings sustained minor siding and fascia damage. Trees were snapped or uprooted as well, including one that fell on a home.						
EF1	NW of Mowrystown to SSE of New Vienna	Highland	OH	39.1159°N 83.8178°W	22:26–22:40	14.16 mi (22.79 km)	400 yd (370 m)
EF1	This tornado caused significant damage to several barns and a mobile home shortly after touching down. After moving to the northeast and causing some minor damage to trees and a few structures, the tornado strengthened again as it struck the Pricetown community, where several homes suffered considerable roof damage, one of which had its attached garage torn off and mostly flattened. The tornado then weakened and may have lifted briefly as it continued north-northeast through mostly open fields, causing only minor tree damage and downing a power pole. The tornado then strengthened again as it crossed US 50, where a church had much of its roof ripped off and some outbuildings were damaged and trees and tree limbs were downed. It then weakened momentarily, but strengthened again as it struck the Willettsville community, inflicting roof damage to numerous homes and outbuildings, and including another home that had its attached garage collapsed. The tornado then weakened for the final time and continued northeastward, causing some additional minor tree and roof damage before dissipating.						
EF0	S of New Vienna	Highland	OH	39.2751°N 83.7166°W	22:35–22:37	0.9 mi (1.4 km)	150 yd (140 m)
EF0	This brief tornado was likely a satellite to the previous tornado. A shed was largely destroyed, a few homes sustained minor roof and siding damage, and some trees were damaged as well.						
EF0	WNW of Frankfort	Ross	OH	39.4107°N 83.2021°W	23:13–23:14	0.85 mi (1.37 km)	50 yd (46 m)
EF0	A brief tornado snapped or uprooted multiple trees. A concession stand sustained minor roof damage and a chain-link fence was damaged as well.						
EF1	NNW of Hickory Tavern to Gray Court to NNW of Cross Anchor	Laurens, Spartanburg	SC	34.589°N 82.226°W	00:14–00:37	21.27 mi (34.23 km)	50 yd (46 m)
EF1	This weak and narrow but long-lived tornado struck the communities of Gray Court and Lanford directly. Damage along its path mainly consisted of dozens of trees being snapped or uprooted, including multiple trees that fell onto homes.						

=== March 11 event ===
List of confirmed tornadoes – Saturday, March 11, 2023
EF#	Location	County / parish	State	Start coord.	Time (UTC)	Path length	Max. width
EF1	NW of Chinese Camp	Tuolumne	CA	37.93°N 120.53°W	22:52–22:53	0.8 mi (1.3 km)	100 yd (91 m)
EF1	A brief low-end EF1 tornado caused extensive damage to oak and pine trees, including some trees that were uprooted. At least two power poles were snapped in half as well. This was the first tornado ever documented in Tuolumne County.						

=== March 12 event ===
List of confirmed tornadoes – Sunday, March 12, 2023
EF#	Location	County / parish	State	Start coord.	Time (UTC)	Path length	Max. width
EF0	SE of Alexander City	Tallapoosa	AL	32.907°N 85.911°W	13:17–13:18	0.59 mi (0.95 km)	100 yd (91 m)
EF0	Several trees and tree limbs were downed by a weak tornado that touched down just north of US 280. A small church sign was blown over in a cemetery as well.						

=== March 13 event ===
List of confirmed tornadoes – Monday, March 13, 2023
EF#	Location	County / parish	State	Start coord.	Time (UTC)	Path length	Max. width
EFU	SSW of Edgar	Putnam	FL	29.57°N 81.96°W	07:32	unknown	unknown
EFU	A tornado produced a TDS on radar.						

=== March 16 event ===
List of confirmed tornadoes – Thursday, March 16, 2023
EF#	Location	County / parish	State	Start coord.	Time (UTC)	Path length	Max. width
EF0	N of Velma	Stephens	OK	34.5613°N 97.67°W	19:57	0.1 mi (0.16 km)	20 yd (18 m)
EF0	Multiple people observed a brief tornado.						
EF0	Las Piedras	Las Piedras	PR	18.1734°N 65.8775°W	19:10–19:16	0.25 mi (0.40 km)	7 yd (6.4 m)
EF0	A landspout tornado was spotted over PR-30 as it moved south-southeast. Business signs and awnings were damaged at a strip mall, a free-standing light pole fell over, and small tree branches were snapped.						
EF1	Northern Grand Prairie to Irving	Dallas	TX	32.8066°N 97.0338°W	21:47–21:55	6.37 mi (10.25 km)	100 yd (91 m)
EF1	This tornado touched down in the northern part of Grand Prairie, where the tornado peeled sections of roofing from a warehouse and caused scattered tree damage. It moved southeast and then east into southern Irving, where it struck an apartment complex and removed portions of the roof. Continuing eastward, the tornado caused intermittent tree damage and light shingle loss across several neighborhoods. Near the end of its path, it produced minor structural damage to a discount store and an adjacent city building before dissipating.						
EF1	Northern Irving	Dallas	TX	32.8375°N 96.9593°W	21:52–21:56	0.71 mi (1.14 km)	100 yd (91 m)
EF1	A brief tornado formed in central Irving near SH 183, where an auto dealership suffered roof and front façade damage and a nearby power pole was pushed over. The tornado then moved northeast through nearby apartment complexes and residential areas, causing scattered tree damage and occasional minor roof impacts. It weakened as it progressed and dissipated near the end of its path.						
EF1	Northern Corsicana	Navarro	TX	32.1319°N 96.495°W	00:58–01:04	2.77 mi (4.46 km)	50 yd (46 m)
EF1	This tornado formed on the northern outskirts of Corsicana, initially producing tree damage across open fields. It then moved southeast into the northern part of the city, where it caused significant damage to a single-family home, removing sections of shingles and roof sheathing and inflicting substantial tree damage. Nearby, a large trailer was rolled multiple times, resulting in serious injuries to two occupants. As the tornado continued southeast, damage became more intermittent and weaker, consisting mainly of tree damage. In its final stage, the tornado turned east, crossed I-45-F, produced another area of more concentrated tree damage, and dissipated shortly before reaching I-45.						

=== March 17 event ===
List of confirmed tornadoes – Friday, March 17, 2023
EF#	Location	County / parish	State	Start coord.	Time (UTC)	Path length	Max. width
EF0	ESE of Grayton Beach	Walton	FL	30.34°N 86.14°W	00:20–00:21	0.12 mi (0.19 km)	25 yd (23 m)
EF0	A brief tornado developed near SR 30A at Grayton Beach State Park, uprooting and snapping several trees in and near a parking area. The tornado then moved into an inaccessible wetland where it dissipated.						
EF0	SE of Ebro	Bay	FL	30.36°N 85.83°W	00:49–00:57	5.2 mi (8.4 km)	25 yd (23 m)
EF0	A tornado caused tree damage around the Panama City airport.						

=== March 21 event ===
List of confirmed tornadoes – Tuesday, March 21, 2023
EF#	Location	County / parish	State	Start coord.	Time (UTC)	Path length	Max. width
EF0	Carpinteria	Santa Barbara	CA	34.4167°N 119.5389°W	00:45–00:47	0.24 mi (0.39 km)	25 yd (23 m)
EF0	A likely waterspout moved onshore as a brief, weak tornado. A total of twenty-six homes in a mobile home park were damaged and trees suffered minor damage. One person was injured.						

=== March 22 event ===
List of confirmed tornadoes – Wednesday, March 22, 2023
EF#	Location	County / parish	State	Start coord.	Time (UTC)	Path length	Max. width
EF1	Montebello	Los Angeles	CA	33.997°N 118.1238°W	18:14–18:18	0.47 mi (0.76 km)	50 yd (46 m)
EF1	This high-end EF1 tornado impacted an industrial area in Montebello, damaging multiple warehouses, some of which had a significant amount of roofing removed. One warehouse sustained almost total collapse of its roof, and an HVAC unit was torn off as well. Skylights were broken, wooden cross beams collapsed, numerous vehicles were damaged by flying debris, and a power pole was snapped with a transformer blown off. A semi-trailer and fences were toppled over, windows were shattered, and signs were damaged or destroyed as well. A healthy pine tree was uprooted, and a few smaller trees were also downed. In total, 17 structures were damaged, 11 of which sustained significant damage. One person was injured. This was the strongest tornado to strike the Greater Los Angeles metro area since March 1983.						

=== March 24 event ===
List of confirmed tornadoes – Friday, March 24, 2023
EF#	Location	County / parish	State	Start coord.	Time (UTC)	Path length	Max. width
EF1	SW of Whitt to NW of Poolville	Parker	TX	32.9467°N 98.0363°W	09:52–09:58	6.73 mi (10.83 km)	75 yd (69 m)
EF1	As the tornado touched down, a large RV was rolled upside down, injuring two people. Elsewhere along the path, the roof of a metal building was damaged and another RV was rolled over. Multiple large trees were snapped along the tornado's path as well.						
EF1	Northwestern Poolville	Parker, Wise	TX	32.9597°N 97.91°W	09:56–10:00	5.47 mi (8.80 km)	100 yd (91 m)
EF1	A few houses sustained roof and siding damage and a metal garage structure was uplifted and overturned. A large, covered pavilion roof was completely collapsed while several outbuildings and multiple manufactured homes were damaged. Extensive damage to trees occurred in and around town as well. Three people were injured.						
EF4	SW of Rolling Fork to Midnight to NE of Silver City	Issaquena, Sharkey, Humphreys, Holmes	MS	32.8414°N 90.9993°W	00:57–02:08	59.41 mi (95.61 km)	1,320 yd (1,210 m)
EF4	17 deaths – See article on this tornado – 165 people were injured.						
EF1	ESE of Eurekaton	Haywood	TN	35.4248°N 89.1976°W	01:19–01:20	0.26 mi (0.42 km)	70 yd (64 m)
EF1	A house, barn, and an outbuilding sustained roof damage as a result of this brief tornado. Numerous trees were snapped or uprooted, including one that fell on a residence and inflicted severe roof damage.						
EF1	E of Crowder to NE of Pope	Panola	MS	34.1625°N 90.0458°W	01:25–01:34	8.39 mi (13.50 km)	100 yd (91 m)
EF1	This tornado touched down to the east of Crowder and moved to the northeast, snapping or uprooting trees. The tornado then moved through Pope, where minor roof damage occurred and additional trees were downed, one of which landed on a house and caused structural damage. The tornado exited Pope and caused minor damage to an outbuilding before dissipating.						
EF1	E of Courtland	Panola	MS	34.2381°N 89.8482°W	01:38–01:44	6.18 mi (9.95 km)	150 yd (140 m)
EF1	Numerous trees were snapped or uprooted and a few utility poles were downed. Homes and outbuildings sustained minor damage as well.						
EF1	W of Burgess	Panola, Lafayette	MS	34.3219°N 89.7309°W	01:47–01:51	3.94 mi (6.34 km)	125 yd (114 m)
EF1	Sporadic but significant tree damage occurred along the path while barns and outbuildings sustained minor structural damage.						
EF3	SW of Black Hawk to Southern Winona to SSW of Lodi	Carroll, Montgomery	MS	33.31°N 90.04°W	02:12–02:42	29.43 mi (47.36 km)	1,250 yd (1,140 m)
EF3	3 deaths – See section on this tornado – Five people were injured.						
EF1	N of Blue Springs	Union	MS	34.4721°N 88.8706°W	02:38–02:39	0.73 mi (1.17 km)	125 yd (114 m)
EF1	A brief low-end EF1 tornado damaged an outbuilding and a patio at a residence and inflicted roof damage to a few other homes. Numerous trees were snapped or uprooted and one man was injured when a tree fell on his vehicle.						
EF1	S of Jug Fork to Southern Guntown to ESE of Baldwyn	Lee	MS	34.4021°N 88.7862°W	02:45–02:57	14.66 mi (23.59 km)	250 yd (230 m)
EF1	A tornado touched down in the rural community of Birmingham and moved to the northeast, snapping or uprooting trees, damaging outbuildings and the roofs of homes, and destroying a carport at one residence. It then struck the south side of Guntown, where more trees were downed, two large sheds were destroyed, and a couple of homes were damaged, one of which had an exterior wall shifted. Additional damage to trees and an outbuilding occurred further along the path before the tornado dissipated.						
EF3	SW of Egypt to Amory to E of Turon	Chickasaw, Monroe, Itawamba	MS	33.8527°N 88.7576°W	03:38–04:09	36.56 mi (58.84 km)	1,600 yd (1,500 m)
EF3	2 deaths – See article on this tornado – 55 people were injured.						
EF2	Northeastern Florence	Lauderdale	AL	34.8086°N 87.6553°W	03:54–04:02	3.82 mi (6.15 km)	300 yd (270 m)
EF2	A strong tornado caused significant damage in the Blackberry Trail Golf Course subdivision where multiple homes were heavily damaged and had large portions of their roofs torn off. A few had damage to exterior walls as well. One home had two rooms with all of its exterior walls collapsed and another residence had its front exterior wall bowed outward.						
EF1	NNW of Anderson	Lauderdale	AL	34.9685°N 87.2904°W	04:14–04:18	4.07 mi (6.55 km)	120 yd (110 m)
EF1	A house sustained roof damage and had its garage destroyed. Trees were uprooted and snapped as well.						
EF1	Northern Bear Creek	Marion	AL	34.2781°N 87.7661°W	04:44−04:49	5.19 mi (8.35 km)	275 yd (251 m)
EF1	A house was heavily damaged by this high-end EF1 tornado and a few others were damaged to a lesser degree. A large barn was destroyed with its debris strewn across a road and some outbuildings were damaged. A pontoon boat and trailer were moved 25 yd (23 m) and numerous trees were snapped or uprooted along the path as well.						
EF2	Fayetteville	Lincoln	TN	35.1454°N 86.5794°W	04:59–05:05	3.96 mi (6.37 km)	300 yd (270 m)
EF2	This low-end EF2 tornado moved directly through Fayetteville. Lincoln Medical Center was hit by the tornado, which had facade and a rooftop HVAC unit torn off and also sustained damage to an exterior wall. Cars in the parking lot were flipped or had windows blown out. At the Lincoln County Fairgrounds, horse stables had reinforced roofing torn off, some warehouse buildings were heavily damaged, and a large shed was completely destroyed with 4x4 wooden anchors snapped off at ground level. A few other outbuilding structures on the property were damaged or destroyed and a horse trailer was rolled 80 yd (73 m). Homes in the city had roofing and siding removed, trees and power poles were snapped, and light poles were knocked over. Some businesses also sustained roof, window, and exterior damage, and pieces of wood were speared into the ground. The tornado exited Fayetteville and continued to the east, downing more trees and damaging or destroying a couple of outbuildings before dissipating.						

=== March 25 event ===
List of confirmed tornadoes – Saturday, March 25, 2023
EF#	Location	County / parish	State	Start coord.	Time (UTC)	Path length	Max. width
EF1	NE of Haleyville	Lawrence	AL	34.34°N 87.473°W	05:00–05:06	2.76 mi (4.44 km)	130 yd (120 m)
EF1	High-resolution satellite imagery revealed an EF1 tornado that uprooted numerous trees in the Bankhead National Forest.						
EF2	WSW of Danville to Northern Hartselle	Lawrence, Morgan	AL	34.4016°N 87.1348°W	05:23–05:29	13.53 mi (21.77 km)	175 yd (160 m)
EF2	1 death – This tornado developed southwest of Danville, causing minor roof damage to chicken houses before moving through town. The scoreboard at the Danville High School football field was partially destroyed, some buildings had metal roofing peeled back, and sporadic tree damage was noted. It moved to the northeast away from Danville, downing countless trees, inflicting considerable damage to homes and outbuildings and destroying a carport. The tornado reached its peak intensity as it moved through the north side of Hartselle, where a well-anchored mobile home was torn off its foundation and destroyed, killing the occupant. Homes had roofing material and carports torn off and many large trees and power poles were snapped in town as well. The tornado dissipated as it moved out of town.						
EF1	W of Estill Springs	Franklin	TN	35.2258°N 86.1708°W	05:24–05:39	15.26 mi (24.56 km)	240 yd (220 m)
EF1	Homes and farm buildings sustained roof damage as a result of this intermittent low-end EF1 tornado. Many trees were snapped or uprooted along the path as well.						
EF2	E of Falkville	Morgan	AL	34.367°N 86.8713°W	05:33–05:36	4.94 mi (7.95 km)	125 yd (114 m)
EF2	A log cabin-style home had part of its roof torn off, power poles were snapped, and countless large trees were snapped or uprooted as this tornado moved through wooded areas. A large and well-anchored pole barn was completely destroyed and 500 lb (230 kg) hay bales were thrown long distances from the structure. Another barn was damaged and a camper was hit by a fallen tree before the tornado moved into a heavily wooded area that was inaccessible to the damage survey team.						
EF1	WNW of Union Grove	Morgan	AL	34.4758°N 86.6003°W	05:47–05:50	2.09 mi (3.36 km)	325 yd (297 m)
EF1	Numerous trees were uprooted and the roofs of chicken houses were damaged.						
EF1	NW of Flat Rock to N of Cartersville	Jackson, DeKalb	AL	34.7856°N 85.7393°W	06:28–06:36	8.51 mi (13.70 km)	250 yd (230 m)
EF1	The tornado touched down north of Flat Rock where multiple chicken houses sustained roof damage and numerous softwood trees were uprooted. In DeKalb County, minor roof damage to a single-family home occurred. More trees were uprooted and power poles were tilted before the tornado lifted. (Note: These reports incorrectly label the tornado as an EF0)						
EF0	N of Ashford to SW of Columbia	Houston	AL	31.2144°N 85.2388°W	14:00–14:10	4.46 mi (7.18 km)	50 yd (46 m)
EF0	A metal outbuilding was destroyed, a wooden storage building collapsed, and several homes sustained minor damage to their roofs and siding. A large but diseased tree fell onto a double-wide manufactured home, significantly damaging the structure.						
EF0	Cadwell	Laurens	GA	32.3410°N 83.0395°W	20:17–20:19	1.5 mi (2.4 km)	100 yd (91 m)
EF0	This weak tornado touched down in Cadwell, where a manufactured home had its porch roof lifted off and a shed was destroyed. The tornado also caused damage to trees. (Note: The 1st report is an incorrect duplication of the 2nd report)						

=== March 26 event ===
List of confirmed tornadoes – Sunday, March 26, 2023
EF#	Location	County / parish	State	Start coord.	Time (UTC)	Path length	Max. width
EF3	NW of West Point to NE of Pine Mountain	Troup, Meriwether	GA	32.8984°N 85.1856°W	10:49–11:19	21.7 mi (34.9 km)	500 yd (460 m)
EF3	See section on this tornado – Five people were injured.						
EF1	Northern Milledgeville	Baldwin	GA	33.0864°N 83.2502°W	11:40–11:50	7 mi (11 km)	250 yd (230 m)
EF1	A tornado developed and moved through the north side of Milledgeville, causing damage to numerous homes, businesses, industrial buildings, and trees. At the Atrium Health Navicent Baldwin Hospital, windows were shattered and a large part of the hospital's roof and covered walkway collapsed. Northside Baptist Church had siding removed and its back wall was partially blown out and an HVAC unit was torn from the structure and thrown into the parking lot. A trailer was thrown into a warehouse, cars were damaged by flying debris, and some semi-trailers were overturned. A billboard was destroyed and many trees were snapped or uprooted in town, some of which landed on homes.						
EF1	SE of Camden (1st tornado)	Wilcox	AL	31.94°N 87.22°W	00:27–00:30	1.17 mi (1.88 km)	500 yd (460 m)
EF1	A high-end EF1 tornado touched down just southeast of a small lake in between several dirt roads. The tornado moved due north on the right side of the lake and dirt road, expanding rapidly in width and uprooting or snapping many softwood and hardwood trees. The tornado started moving northeast after this point, quickly beginning an occlusion to the north and northwest, which was clearly evident with a narrow convergent path of uprooted visible on high-resolution satellite imagery. This was the first of three tornadoes from this cyclical supercell in southern Alabama. It was initially believed to have been one continuous tornado, but a reanalysis concluded that three separate tornadoes touched down.						
EF1	SE of Camden (2nd tornado)	Wilcox	AL	31.95°N 87.21°W	00:30	1.05 mi (1.69 km)	300 yd (270 m)
EF1	This tornado began immediately as the prior tornado above quickly occluded and dissipated off to the northwest, leaving a narrow swath of uprooted trees. It continued to the east before it rapidly began occluding and turned northward, nearly completing a full cyclonic loop back to the southwest before it dissipated. High-resolution satellite imagery which allowed for the distinction of this tornado from the other two tornadoes in its vicinity. This was the second of three tornadoes from this cyclical supercell in southern Alabama. It was initially believed to have been one continuous tornado event, but a reanalysis concluded that three separate tornadoes touched down.						
EF1	SE of Camden (3rd tornado)	Wilcox	AL	31.95°N 87.21°W	00:30–00:32	3.31 mi (5.33 km)	300 yd (270 m)
EF1	This tornado quickly grew in size and intensified as it curved to the north. Based on high-resolution satellite imagery, numerous trees were uprooted and snapped at high-end EF1 intensity. The tornado narrowed as it moved over Pursley Creek and weakened, downing a couple of trees and damaging power lines before lifting. This was last of three tornadoes from this cyclical supercell in southern Alabama. It was initially believed to have been one continuous tornado event, but a reanalysis concluded that three separate tornadoes touched down.						
EF1	N of Fulton	Clarke	AL	31.8318°N 87.7742°W	01:24–01:26	1.67 mi (2.69 km)	340 yd (310 m)
EF1	A well-built house sustained minor damage, a shed had its overhang blown off, and another shed was overturned onto its roof. A ski boat and a trailer were pushed over and blown down a hill, and numerous trees were snapped or uprooted as well.						
EF2	SW of Catherine	Marengo, Wilcox	AL	32.182°N 87.595°W	01:33–01:40	6 mi (9.7 km)	750 yd (690 m)
EF2	Numerous large trees were snapped and uprooted, and two gates were damaged.						
EF0	Western Prattville	Autauga	AL	32.448°N 86.492°W	02:39–02:41	1.03 mi (1.66 km)	200 yd (180 m)
EF0	Trees and limbs were blown down, metal panels were blown off a business, and power poles and lines were downed by falling trees on the west side of Prattville.						
EF1	Lake Martin	Elmore, Tallapoosa	AL	32.7106°N 85.969°W	03:22–03:29	7.47 mi (12.02 km)	1,200 yd (1,100 m)
EF1	This large high-end EF1 tornado touched down in a wooded area in northeastern Elmore County, where it immediately snapped or uprooted many trees. More trees were downed when the tornado crossed a portion of the lake into the Castaway Island area, where several homes and structures were damaged by falling trees. At The Ridge subdivision, three to four homes sustained considerable roof and siding damage, and many surrounding trees were blown down. A couple of concrete electric transmission poles were downed as well. The tornado then crossed an inaccessible and uninhabited island before moving into Tallapoosa County, where only sporadic tree damage occurred in a few neighborhoods before the tornado dissipated.						

=== March 27 event ===
List of confirmed tornadoes – Monday, March 27, 2023
EF#	Location	County / parish	State	Start coord.	Time (UTC)	Path length	Max. width
EF2	WNW of Shorter to Milstead to ENE of Franklin	Macon	AL	32.4103°N 86.008°W	07:41–08:06	15.41 mi (24.80 km)	1,450 yd (1,330 m)
EF2	A large and strong tornado began near Shorter, downing trees and destroying a carport shortly after touching down. The tornado intensified and reached its peak strength as it moved through the small community of Milstead, where a large metal-framed cotton gin warehouse was completely destroyed, and some nearby outbuilding structures were also destroyed. Multiple semi-trucks were flipped onto their sides, the top of a silo was blown off, and many large trees and concrete power poles were snapped in this area. It then damaged buildings at the Auburn University E.V. Smith Research Center, including a farm shed that partially collapsed with its debris scattered across a road. Past Milstead, the tornado weakened and moved eastward through Franklin and surrounding rural areas, downing many trees, overturning a pivot irrigation sprinkler, and inflicting minor damage to a few homes before dissipating.						
EF1	NNE of Durand	Meriwether	GA	32.9637°N 84.7778°W	11:06–11:19	8.7 mi (14.0 km)	150 yd (140 m)
EF1	Hundreds of trees were snapped and uprooted, and several houses were damaged by falling trees, including a mobile home that was largely destroyed. A frame home sustained considerable damage elsewhere along the path, while other homes and an outbuilding sustained more minor roof damage.						
EF0	W of Gordon	Twiggs	GA	32.8794°N 83.4227°W	12:52–12:53	0.32 mi (0.51 km)	50 yd (46 m)
EF0	Trees were snapped and uprooted, and siding was blown off a home.						

=== March 31 event ===
List of confirmed tornadoes – Friday, March 31, 2023
EF#	Location	County / parish	State	Start coord.	Time (UTC)	Path length	Max. width
EF3	Little Rock to Jacksonville to SE of Cabot	Pulaski, Lonoke	AR	34.7251°N 92.4824°W	19:18–19:58	34.23 mi (55.09 km)	800 yd (730 m)
EF3	See article on this tornado – 54 people were injured.						
EFU	SE of Banner	Tazewell	IL	40.4736°N 89.8701°W	19:37–19:38	0.25 mi (0.40 km)	10 yd (9.1 m)
EFU	A brief tornado was observed by weather spotters and caused no damage.						
EF1	NW of Deer Creek	Tazewell	IL	40.63°N 89.35°W	20:15–20:16	0.87 mi (1.40 km)	10 yd (9.1 m)
EF1	A barn was damaged before the tornado dissipated in a field.						
EFU	E of Eureka	Woodford	IL	40.72°N 89.22°W	20:23–20:24	0.59 mi (0.95 km)	20 yd (18 m)
EFU	A storm chaser recorded a tornado that caused no damage through an open field.						
EF3	E of Dahlonega to SW of Keota	Wapello, Keokuk	IA	41.0615°N 92.3334°W	20:36–21:15	26.09 mi (41.99 km)	1,000 yd (910 m)
EF3	A high-end, intense EF3 tornado began northeast of Ottumwa and caused major structural damage, destroying a mobile home and tearing the roof and an exterior wall off a house, with debris failure likely starting at the garage. Two well-anchored hog confinement buildings were completely destroyed. A well-built brick home later in the path received roof and window damage but remained structurally sound. Near the Wapello-Keokuk county line, an older unanchored house was pushed off its foundation and collapsed, while nearby trees and a propane tank showed little damage. As the tornado continued into Keokuk County southeast of Martinsburg and tracked toward IA 92, it produced intense damage to a home and caused additional severe damage to farmsteads and outbuildings before lifting southwest of Keota.						
EF1	WSW of Des Arc	Prairie	AR	34.9457°N 91.6692°W	20:45–20:46	1.1 mi (1.8 km)	100 yd (91 m)
EF1	This tornado began in an open field southwest of AR 86, where it snapped a power pole. It then crossed over a barn and lifted the barn’s roof. As it continued north, the tornado removed shingles from a nearby house before lifting shortly afterward.						
EFU	SE of Malcom	Poweshiek	IA	41.6489°N 92.544°W	20:52–20:57	3.58 mi (5.76 km)	60 yd (55 m)
EFU	A tornado was recorded by local broadcast media as it tracked through fields.						
EFU	N of Pontiac	Livingston	IL	40.9559°N 88.6529°W	21:05–21:06	0.03 mi (0.048 km)	15 yd (14 m)
EFU	This very brief tornado kicked up some dirt and caused no damage.						
EF4	SW of Keota to NW of Amish	Keokuk, Washington, Iowa, Johnson	IA	41.31°N 92.03°W	21:10–21:37	19.9 mi (32.0 km)	700 yd (640 m)
EF4	See section on this tornado – 3 people were injured						
EF1	ENE of Cleves to SW of Aplington	Grundy	IA	42.4931°N 92.9753°W	21:22–21:28	3.53 mi (5.68 km)	80 yd (73 m)
EF1	Several trees and outbuildings were damaged.						
EF1	N of Wellsburg to S of Aplington	Grundy	IA	42.4742°N 92.9402°W	21:22–21:29	4.14 mi (6.66 km)	80 yd (73 m)
EF1	This tornado damaged a grain bin, an outbuilding, multiple trees and power poles.						
EF3	SE of Fair Oaks, AR to Wynne, AR to Southern Gilt Edge, TN to S of Burlison, TN	Cross (AR), Crittenden (AR), Tipton (TN), Mississippi (AR)	AR, TN	35.1818°N 90.9611°W	21:30–22:54	72.55 mi (116.76 km)	1,600 yd (1,500 m)
EF3	4 deaths – See article on this tornado – 26 people were injured.						
EF2	NW of Vinton	Benton	IA	42.18°N 92.09°W	21:36–21:39	1.7 mi (2.7 km)	50 yd (46 m)
EF2	This strong tornado inflicted significant damage to farm buildings, trees, and power poles.						
EF0	SW of Amish to ESE of Windham	Johnson	IA	41.53°N 91.79°W	21:37–21:46	6.1 mi (9.8 km)	50 yd (46 m)
EF0	A few farm outbuildings were damaged.						
EF2	NW of Urbana to ENE of Brandon	Benton, Buchanan	IA	42.26°N 91.93°W	21:47–21:54	4.87 mi (7.84 km)	50 yd (46 m)
EF2	A low-end EF2 tornado caused significant damage to trees, farm buildings, and a house.						
EF2	ESE of Cosgrove to Coralville to Solon	Johnson	IA	41.63°N 91.69°W	21:48–22:08	16.93 mi (27.25 km)	75 yd (69 m)
EF2	This strong tornado formed southwest of Coralville and crossed US 218, damaging a warehouse near US 6 and flipping several trailers and a truck. A nearby retail building lost part of its roof, and multiple vehicles were rolled. The tornado moved into a residential area, snapping and uprooting many trees, with at least two reported injuries. Damage became more scattered before the tornado intensified again as it crossed Coralville Lake. A concentrated damage path began near a campground east of North Liberty and continued toward Solon, where a radio tower collapsed and part of a home’s roof was removed. The tornado then moved into open fields, destroying an outbuilding and lofting debris, including driving a 2×4 into the ground. It entered Solon, uprooting trees, bending street signs, and destroying another outbuilding before dissipating just after exiting the town.						
EF2	Alco to N of Newnata	Stone	AR	35.8855°N 92.3665°W	21:49–21:57	6.8 mi (10.9 km)	125 yd (114 m)
EF2	A low-end EF2 tornado first touched down in Alco, where a couple of homes and outbuildings had roofing blown off. The tornado exited town and reached its peak intensity as a one-story home was pushed off its block foundation and sustained roof and exterior wall loss. Elsewhere, minor damage to a house and an outbuilding occurred, and trees were downed before the tornado dissipated.						
EFU	NW of Urbana	Benton	IA	42.2456°N 91.9223°W	21:51–21:53	1.35 mi (2.17 km)	10 yd (9.1 m)
EFU	A tornado scar was noted in fields using high-resolution satellite imagery.						
EF2	Hills to Southeastern Iowa City to S of Oasis	Johnson	IA	41.54°N 91.56°W	21:53–22:08	14.69 mi (23.64 km)	100 yd (91 m)
EF2	This strong tornado began southwest of Hills and moved northeast, crossing US 218 through the northwest side of town. It destroyed several outbuildings, large trees, and damaged trim and siding on homes. The worst damage occurred in western Hills, where multiple roofs were completely torn off, siding was stripped from several houses, and a large outbuilding was destroyed. The tornado then moved through a wooded area, snapping numerous trees, before continuing northeast and damaging siding and roofs on several homes on the far southeast side of Iowa City. It crossed I-80 and lifted shortly afterward.						
EFU	SE of Rowley	Buchanan	IA	42.3472°N 91.8244°W	22:03–22:05	1.66 mi (2.67 km)	10 yd (9.1 m)
EFU	High-resolution satellite imagery showed a tornado scar in fields.						
EF0	Southern West Branch to S of Cedar Valley	Cedar	IA	41.64°N 91.36°W	22:06–22:16	8.3 mi (13.4 km)	10 yd (9.1 m)
EF0	This weak tornado caused no damage until the end of its path, where some trees were slightly damaged.						
EF2	Northwestern Solon to Southern Mount Vernon	Johnson, Linn	IA	41.81°N 91.51°W	22:06–22:18	8.97 mi (14.44 km)	75 yd (69 m)
EF2	A strong tornado formed and clipped northwest side of Solon as it moved northeast, snapping and uprooting trees and tearing part of a shed roof. A nearby farmstead lost two large outbuildings and grain silos, and power poles were snapped in open fields. As it approached the Johnson-Linn county line, numerous trees were downed and some were rolled into a field, while one house sustained minor shingle damage and broken windows. The tornado crossed into Linn County and continued northeast, causing additional tree, roof, and outbuilding damage before dissipating in the southern part of Mount Vernon.						
EF2	W of Tipton to S of Oxford Mills	Cedar	IA	41.76°N 91.17°W	22:14–22:38	16.42 mi (26.43 km)	250 yd (230 m)
EF2	This strong tornado touched down just west of Tipton, where it tore the roof off a house and uprooted large trees. It moved northeast toward the Clarence area, snapping power poles and causing significant damage to multiple outbuildings. The tornado lifted just south of the Cedar–Jones county line.						
EFU	NW of Bloomfield	Scott	IL	39.66°N 90.58°W	22:15–22:17	0.53 mi (0.85 km)	10 yd (9.1 m)
EFU	A storm spotter observed a tornado moving through the Illinois River bottoms. No damage occurred.						
EF1	SE of Cedar Valley to Southwestern Tipton	Cedar	IA	41.71°N 91.21°W	22:17–22:23	5.2 mi (8.4 km)	100 yd (91 m)
EF1	A high-end EF1 tornado damaged outbuildings and homes.						
EF2	Lime City to NNW of Big Rock	Cedar, Scott, Clinton	IA	41.62°N 91.14°W	22:18–22:40	19.56 mi (31.48 km)	200 yd (180 m)
EF2	This strong tornado touched down north of Atalissa and immediately snapped power poles and large trees along its path. It caused significant damage to two homes southwest of Bennett and flipped a semi-truck on I-80. Several concrete block silos south of Bennett were also damaged. The tornado then continued northeast through rural areas with sporadic tree damage before clipping northwest Scott County, then into Clinton County, where it dissipated south of Wheatland.						
EF1	Manchester	Delaware	IA	42.442°N 91.499°W	22:20–22:28	4.1 mi (6.6 km)	50 yd (46 m)
EF1	A high-end EF1 tornado touched down southwest of Manchester, causing damage to farms and trees. It then moved northeast directly into town, heavily damaging some industrial buildings and destroying a small outbuilding. Large trees were uprooted and power lines were downed as well.						
EFU	E of Chapin	Morgan	IL	39.7671°N 90.3526°W	22:27–22:28	0.73 mi (1.17 km)	10 yd (9.1 m)
EFU	A brief tornado occurred. No damage was noted.						
EF1	SW of Oneida to WNW of Colesburg	Delaware, Clayton	IA	42.525°N 91.372°W	22:32–22:47	11.1 mi (17.9 km)	90 yd (82 m)
EF1	A high-end EF1 tornado formed moved northeast. Along its path, it damaged several farm outbuildings, snapped trees, and left visible scour marks in fields confirmed by high-resolution satellite imagery. The tornado continued northeast to the west of Colesburg before dissipating.						
EF0	N of Jacksonville	Morgan	IL	39.81°N 90.23°W	22:35–22:36	1.06 mi (1.71 km)	30 yd (27 m)
EF0	Minor tree damage occurred.						
EF1	Eastern Wyoming	Jones	IA	42.0541°N 91.0072°W	22:41–22:43	1.37 mi (2.20 km)	50 yd (46 m)
EF1	A tornado touched down south of Wyoming and moved across the east side of town, snapping at least two trees and causing additional tree damage along its path. Pieces of twisted metal were lofted and deposited in the fire department parking lot.						
EF2	Mediapolis	Des Moines	IA	41.0011°N 91.1708°W	22:41–22:43	0.95 mi (1.53 km)	150 yd (140 m)
EF2	This brief but strong tornado moved east across the southern part of Mediapolis, tearing siding and shingles from several homes and businesses. Large tree limbs fell onto mobile homes and frame houses, causing roof and siding damage. Near the center of town, the tornado briefly intensified, producing strong damage by removing the entire roof from one home and snapping several large trees near the base. It quickly weakened and dissipated on the east side of town.						
EF3	NW of Munford to Southern Covington to SE of Belle Eagle	Tipton, Haywood	TN	35.4621°N 89.8323°W	22:48–23:29	39.18 mi (63.05 km)	2,000 yd (1,800 m)
EF3	1 death – See section on this tornado – 28 people were injured.						
EF2	Grand Mound to Charlotte to NW of Goose Lake	Clinton	IA	41.81°N 90.65°W	22:50–23:10	18.02 mi (29.00 km)	350 yd (320 m)
EF2	A strong tornado touched down in Grand Mound, where trees and power poles were snapped, and roof damage occurred. The tornado exited Grand Mount and damaged a few homes as it continued to the northeast, including one house that was almost completely collapsed after being shifted off its foundation. Three occupants were left trapped inside the house, one of whom suffered minor injuries. Multiple barns and farm buildings were also damaged along this segment of the path. The tornado struck the town of Charlotte, where multiple grain bins, garages, and outbuildings were heavily damaged or destroyed. Homes and other structures in town sustained roof damage, and one building had a brick exterior wall blown out. A large propane tank was ruptured, causing a gas leak that prompted the evacuation of half of the town. Additional tree and outbuilding damage occurred to the northeast of Charlotte before the tornado dissipated.						
EF1	NW of Maquoketa to SW of Fulton	Jackson	IA	42.12°N 90.72°W	22:58–23:01	1.24 mi (2.00 km)	50 yd (46 m)
EF1	Outbuildings on two farmsteads were damaged.						
EF0	N of Andrew	Jackson	IA	42.192°N 90.605°W	23:09–23:10	0.17 mi (0.27 km)	15 yd (14 m)
EF0	A brief tornado destroyed the roof and walls of a shed. Tree branches were damaged as well.						
EF2	Northern Sherman to S of Williamsville	Sangamon	IL	39.896°N 89.6206°W	23:12–23:20	5.42 mi (8.72 km)	400 yd (370 m)
EF2	This high-end EF2 tornado moved through the north side of Sherman, causing major damage as multiple homes had their roofs torn off, a couple of which had their exterior walls collapse. Numerous other homes in town had roofing and siding removed, while outbuilding structures and detached garages were severely damaged. Faith Baptist Church was also damaged, tractor-trailers were flipped, and trees and power poles were downed as well. The tornado exited Sherman and moved to the northeast, damaging two large barns at a horse farm. Some additional outbuildings were damaged, and sheet metal was strewn into fields before the tornado dissipated.						
EF1	S of Bellevue, IA	Jackson (IA), Jo Daviess (IL)	IA, IL	42.2422°N 90.4267°W	23:16–23:29	1.87 mi (3.01 km)	100 yd (91 m)
EF1	This tornado developed south of Bellevue and caused damage to an RV park and some cabins, including a few RVs that were flipped. Three people were injured at the RV park, and trees were damaged or uprooted as well. The tornado then crossed the Mississippi River into Illinois before dissipating.						
EF2	Southeastern Riverton to Latham	Sangamon, Logan	IL	39.8448°N 89.5223°W	23:18–23:46	21.01 mi (33.81 km)	200 yd (180 m)
EF2	A tornado touched down at the southeastern outskirts of Riverton and almost immediately reached its peak intensity, completely tearing the roof off of a business and damaging trees. As it passed north of Dawson and moved through rural areas to the northeast, the tornado weakened significantly and caused only minor outbuilding damage. The tornado entered the town of Latham before it dissipated, inflicting roof shingle damage to a few homes in town.						
EF2	Western Geneseo	Henry	IL	41.42°N 90.23°W	23:24–23:28	3.55 mi (5.71 km)	300 yd (270 m)
EF2	This strong tornado formed to the southwest of Geneseo and moved northeastward, damaging or destroying multiple barns and outbuildings. Grain bins and steel storage tanks were thrown, power poles were snapped, and some ground scouring occurred in farm fields. The tornado then intensified to high-end EF2 strength as it struck the west side of town, destroying multiple metal-framed warehouse buildings. Chain-link fencing was destroyed, and a car was tossed in this area as well. Additional cars were moved and damaged in a parking lot, and some apartment buildings in town sustained roof damage before the tornado abruptly dissipated.						
EF2	N of Atkinson	Henry	IL	41.475°N 90.0584°W	23:33–23:37	3.05 mi (4.91 km)	200 yd (180 m)
EF2	This significant tornado touched down north of Atkinson, completely destroying an outbuilding and scattering its debris into a field. Another outbuilding was damaged, and trees were snapped as well.						
EF2	NNE of Atkinson to NW of Thomas	Henry, Bureau	IL	41.46°N 90°W	23:36–23:47	9.32 mi (15.00 km)	440 yd (400 m)
EF2	A strong tornado developed north of Atkinson and tracked northeast toward Hooppole. Early in its path, a home suffered siding and window damage, while a brick grain silo and an outbuilding were damaged. As the tornado continued, numerous barns, outbuildings, and trees were damaged or destroyed. Near Hooppole, a house lost its entire roof, and additional farm structures were damaged. Toward the end of the track, a grain silo collapsed right before the tornado crossed into Bureau County and dissipated shortly thereafter.						
EF2	Northern Kewanee	Henry	IL	41.23°N 90.02°W	23:37–23:43	6.82 mi (10.98 km)	650 yd (590 m)
EF2	A strong multivortex tornado formed to the west of Kewanee, damaging outbuildings, downing trees and power poles, and blowing an empty grain bin off its foundation. As it moved through the northern edge of Kewanee, the tornado snapped many large trees and several power poles, destroyed a shed, and damaged the roofs of a few homes. The tornado then dissipated at the northeastern outskirts of town.						
EF1	S of Mount Carroll	Carroll	IL	42.0489°N 89.9733°W	22:39–22:42	0.98 mi (1.58 km)	50 yd (46 m)
EF1	Damage occurred to powerlines.						
EF0	E of McVey to SE of Farmersville	Macoupin, Montgomery	IL	39.391°N 89.715°W	23:47–23:53	6.33 mi (10.19 km)	150 yd (140 m)
EF0	This weak tornado touched down and initially damaged a farm building, tearing off part of the roof and driving a plank of wood into the roof of a nearby home. It then moved northeast across open fields and wooded areas before entering Montgomery County. After crossing I-55, the tornado produced minor tree damage along a hedgerow and continued northeast. It later struck a small metal machine shed, lofting debris into adjacent fields and a drainage canal before dissipating shortly thereafter.						
EF1	N of Rewey	Iowa	WI	42.8525°N 90.4002°W	23:48–23:50	1.07 mi (1.72 km)	75 yd (69 m)
EF1	Trees were snapped by a brief tornado, and some outbuildings were heavily damaged or destroyed.						
EF1	NW of New Bedford to NW of Ohio	Bureau, Whiteside, Lee	IL	41.55°N 89.77°W	23:48–00:01	13.88 mi (22.34 km)	150 yd (140 m)
EF1	This high-end EF1 tornado began just south of IL 92 in northwest Bureau County and moved northeast into far southeast Whiteside County. Along its path, it damaged or destroyed multiple farm outbuildings, snapped several power poles, and downed dozens of trees. The most severe damage occurred near the Bureau–Whiteside county line, where a large farmstead outbuilding lost its roof and two walls, with debris thrown far into an adjacent field. The tornado continued several more miles into Lee County, causing additional tree and structural damage before dissipating.						
EF1	E of Platteville to N of Belmont	Lafayette	WI	42.729°N 90.4183°W	23:50–23:55	5.5 mi (8.9 km)	75 yd (69 m)
EF1	Several grain bins and farm buildings were damaged or destroyed, including a small outbuilding that was thrown 100 yd (91 m) into the side of a house. Trees and power poles were snapped, and another house sustained minor damage near the end of the path.						
EF1	ESE of Lanark to WNW of Baileyville	Carroll, Ogle, Stephenson	IL	42.08°N 89.75°W	23:50–00:02	11.01 mi (17.72 km)	200 yd (180 m)
EF1	Numerous farm outbuildings and sheds were destroyed as this tornado struck multiple farmsteads. Several trees were downed as well.						
EF1	N of Belmont to W of Mineral Point	Lafayette, Iowa	WI	42.7964°N 90.3195°W	23:55–00:00	6.59 mi (10.61 km)	75 yd (69 m)
EF1	This tornado formed immediately after the previous tornado dissipated. Multiple barns and farm buildings were damaged or destroyed, and trees were snapped along the path.						
EFU	N of Lexa	Phillips	AR	34.6089°N 90.7929°W	00:03–00:06	2.76 mi (4.44 km)	100 yd (91 m)
EFU	An emergency manager, along with several public weather spotters, observed a tornado that touched down over open fields and crossed AR 1. Although some damage was observed, it was determined that it occurred from straight-line winds and the storm's rear-flank downdraft rather than from the tornado itself. A rating could not be determined as a result.						
EF0	NW of Palmer	Christian	IL	39.4804°N 89.4917°W	00:06–00:08	4.08 mi (6.57 km)	20 yd (18 m)
EF0	A weak tornado damaged the roof of a farm outbuilding and blew a couple of empty grain bins into fields.						
EF2	S of Amboy to NNW of West Brooklyn	Lee	IL	41.6508°N 89.3128°W	00:08–00:18	9.29 mi (14.95 km)	350 yd (320 m)
EF2	A low-end EF2 tornado began in the Woodhaven Lakes campground and damaged multiple campers, including at least two that were rolled. A mobile home was rolled and heavily damaged as well. Large trees were snapped or uprooted, including some that landed on outbuildings and mobile homes. Northeast of the campground, many additional large trees were snapped and stripped of their branches, including two trees that were downed onto a homestead which was largely destroyed, while outbuildings on the property were destroyed as well. A large garage at another residence was also completely demolished by falling trees, and a house lost a large part of its roof. Additional trees and some power poles were downed elsewhere along the path, and a barn was damaged before the tornado dissipated.						
EF1	Southern Sublette to West Brooklyn to WNW of The Burg	Lee	IL	41.6381°N 89.2287°W	00:13–00:21	7.75 mi (12.47 km)	75 yd (69 m)
EF1	This tornado snapped several power poles as it crossed US 52 at the southern edge of Sublette. In rural areas northeast of Sublette, trees were damaged, and an open-air farm building had part of its metal roof torn off, with debris strewn up to 3/4 mi (1.2 km) away. An empty grain bin was pushed off its foundation before the tornado struck West Brooklyn, where a 120 ft (37 m) tall tower was bent in half, and the roof of a bank was blown off, with one of the wooden beams from the roof impaling the roof of a nearby garage. A frail masonry building collapsed, and some trees and power poles were snapped. The tornado then weakened and dissipated northeast of town.						
EF1	S of Taylorville	Christian	IL	39.5°N 89.31°W	19:13–19:14	1.74 mi (2.80 km)	30 yd (27 m)
EF1	Thirty power poles were snapped by this tornado.						
EF0	ESE of Twin Grove to SSW of Juda	Green	WI	42.5229°N 89.5279°W	00:16–00:20	2.95 mi (4.75 km)	75 yd (69 m)
EF0	Many trees branches were snapped, a few trees were uprooted, and a house sustained minor fascia damage. Barns and outbuildings were damaged as well, and pieces of sheet metal were thrown out into farm fields.						
EF1	NW of Oakley to S of Albany	Green	WI	42.5376°N 89.4888°W	00:20–00:29	10.17 mi (16.37 km)	50 yd (46 m)
EF1	Many outbuildings were damaged and some were destroyed, with roofing material blown upwards of 300 yd (270 m) away. A hay cart was rolled about 50 yd (46 m), a grain bin was destroyed, fencing was blown over, and four power poles were snapped. A couple of homes had minor damage, and many trees were also snapped or uprooted.						
EF1	Davis Junction to Belvidere to E of Russellville	Ogle, Winnebago, Boone	IL	42.0723°N 89.1497°W	00:24–00:50	27.51 mi (44.27 km)	600 yd (550 m)
EF1	1 death – This weak but long-tracked tornado developed southeast of Stillman Valley and moved northeastward through Davis Junction, where multiple homes had their roofs damaged, trees were damaged, fencing was downed, and a small building was destroyed at a park. The tornado then tracked to the northeast and moved through the centre of Belvidere and struck the historic Apollo Theatre, which had a large portion of its roof lifted and thrown across the street. Additionally, another part of the theatre's roof collapsed into the interior of the venue, which was hosting a sold-out concert with 260 people for Morbid Angel, Revocation, and Skeletal Remains at the time. At least 40 people were injured, and one person was killed, prompting a mass casualty incident declaration. Other buildings in the downtown area had parts of their brick exteriors damaged, and some outbuilding structures were damaged or destroyed. Trees and light poles were downed, and some homes in town had roofing, siding, and gutters torn off as well. The tornado then exited the city and moved through rural areas, causing additional minor tree damage before dissipating.						
EF0	NW of Brodhead to E of Albany	Green, Rock	WI	42.6368°N 89.4121°W	00:26–00:33	5.75 mi (9.25 km)	75 yd (69 m)
EF0	Multiple trees and outbuildings were damaged, and a house sustained fascia damage.						
EF2	NE of Tunica to NW of Nesbit	Tunica, DeSoto	MS	34.7066°N 90.3381°W	00:31–01:02	22.73 mi (36.58 km)	1,200 yd (1,100 m)
EF2	This tornado formed near Tunica and moved to the northeast, damaging or destroying many sheds and outbuildings, and tearing roofing and siding from numerous houses and mobile homes. A car was flipped, and a carport roof was torn off. A small area of high-end EF2 damage occurred west of Hernando, where a house sustained loss of its roof and had multiple exterior walls knocked down before the tornado moved to the northeast and dissipated. Many large hardwood trees and several power poles were snapped along the path.						
EF1	Rockford	Winnebago	IL	42.258°N 89.0796°W	00:31–00:38	5.79 mi (9.32 km)	300 yd (270 m)
EF1	A tornado began in Rockford and moved northeastward through residential areas of the city, downing numerous trees and tree limbs, including some uprooted trees that fell onto homes. Multiple homes also had minor roof damage, and a few power poles were snapped as well.						
EF1	Northern Rockford to Machesney Park to Roscoe	Winnebago	IL	42.3239°N 89.1053°W	00:33–00:42	8.63 mi (13.89 km)	300 yd (270 m)
EF1	This tornado touched down at the north edge of Rockford, causing minor tree, power pole, and outbuilding damage. It then moved northeastward along the Rock River and passed through Machesney Park, where many homes suffered roof damage, including several homes that had large sections of their roofs removed. Many trees were snapped or uprooted in town, and a couple of garden sheds were destroyed. The tornado downed a few more trees in Roscoe before it dissipated.						
EF1	SSW of Dewey to SSE of Ludlow	Champaign	IL	40.2804°N 88.2907°W	00:39–00:48	10.83 mi (17.43 km)	500 yd (460 m)
EF1	A high-end EF1 tornado demolished an agricultural cooperative due west of Rantoul and just south of Dewey, causing an anhydrous ammonia leak. Passing north of Rantoul, it snapped more than a mile of power lines and blew cars off the roadway along I-57 near Ludlow, flipping a tanker truck as well as a tour bus carrying 32 people, two of which were injured. As a result, I-57 was closed from Rantoul north to Paxton and US 136 was closed for approximately a mile west of Rantoul. Multiple outbuilding structures were completely destroyed along the path as well.						
EF1	Southeastern Caledonia, IL to Sharon to Delavan Lake, WI	Boone (IL), Walworth (WI)	IL, WI	42.3489°N 88.9027°W	00:44–01:01	17.32 mi (27.87 km)	300 yd (270 m)
EF1	This tornado touched down southwest of Caledonia and tracked northeast through mostly farmland, destroying numerous outbuildings, heavily damaging a silo, and collapsing a grain bin. As it moved into the Candlewick Lake neighborhood, several homes sustained roof and siding damage, and multiple trees were damaged. The tornado then crossed Wisconsin, where it continued for several more miles, primarily damaging barns and trees. It eventually weakened and lifted after causing additional rural structural and tree damage.						
EF0	Beloit	Rock	WI	42.5141°N 89.0258°W	00:48–00:54	3.56 mi (5.73 km)	100 yd (91 m)
EF0	Numerous trees were uprooted in Beloit as a result of this weak tornado.						
EF1	Hanerville to SSW of Utica	Dane	WI	42.8744°N 89.1682°W	00:49–00:59	4.75 mi (7.64 km)	75 yd (69 m)
EF1	Two power poles were snapped, a few outbuildings were damaged or destroyed, sheet metal was tossed 400 yd (370 m), and trees were snapped or uprooted.						
EF0	Montgomery to Southern Aurora	Kendall, Kane	IL	41.7124°N 88.3913°W	00:55–01:01	5.6 mi (9.0 km)	200 yd (180 m)
EF0	A weak tornado moved through Montgomery and Aurora, downing multiple trees and tree limbs, a few of which landed on houses. Fencing was blown over, a few homes had roof shingles removed, and one house had one of its windows broken.						
EF1	SSW of Rankin to NNW of Wellington	Vermilion, Iroquois	IL	40.405°N 87.9245°W	00:57–01:15	16.53 mi (26.60 km)	300 yd (270 m)
EF1	Trees were uprooted, while sheds and outbuildings at multiple farmsteads were damaged or destroyed, with their debris scattered into fields. Semi-trailers and pieces of farming equipment were damaged or destroyed as well, and a house sustained roof damage.						
EF0	ESE of Sharon to Eastern Delavan	Walworth	WI	42.4942°N 88.6972°W	01:00–01:09	10.62 mi (17.09 km)	100 yd (91 m)
EF0	Roofing panels were ripped from some farm outbuildings and large trees were toppled.						
EF0	Batavia	Kane	IL	41.8414°N 88.3321°W	01:00–01:02	1.6 mi (2.6 km)	225 yd (206 m)
EF0	A high-end EF0 tornado touched down in Batavia, where it uprooted trees, downed fences and power lines, peeled roof shingles off of homes, and toppled a chimney at a business. A church sign was damaged, and a building had siding torn off as well.						
EF0	Northern St. Charles	Kane	IL	41.9149°N 88.3339°W	01:01–01:03	1.66 mi (2.67 km)	150 yd (140 m)
EF0	Several trees were uprooted, power lines were downed, and roof shingles were peeled off of homes on the north side of St. Charles. A HVAC unit on the roof of a construction facility was also damaged.						
EF0	Southern Plainfield	Kendall, Will	IL	41.5395°N 88.2935°W	01:03–01:08	4.72 mi (7.60 km)	250 yd (230 m)
EF0	A high-end EF0 tornado damaged trees and blew roof shingles and siding off of several homes, including one house that had its chimney collapse. A trampoline was lofted into a tree as well.						
EF0	SE of Walworth to S of Lake Geneva	Walworth	WI	42.4965°N 88.5681°W	01:05–01:09	7 mi (11 km)	50 yd (46 m)
EF0	A barn and a shed were damaged, while sixteen power lines were snapped.						
EF0	Northern Plainfield	Will	IL	41.6366°N 88.2351°W	01:05–01:07	1.58 mi (2.54 km)	125 yd (114 m)
EF0	A brief tornado removed roof shingles and siding from homes, damaged multiple trees and fencing, and tossed trash dumpsters 150 yd (140 m).						
EF0	Lake Ripley	Jefferson	WI	42.995°N 89.0033°W	01:07–01:10	1.45 mi (2.33 km)	75 yd (69 m)
EF0	Multiple houses sustained damage to their roof shingles, siding, and fascia. A small shed was destroyed, a fence was damaged, and trees were snapped or uprooted.						
EF0	E of Richmond	Walworth	WI	42.6814°N 88.7495°W	01:08–01:15	5.39 mi (8.67 km)	50 yd (46 m)
EF0	A house sustained minor fascia damage, and many trees were snapped or uprooted. Metal roofing was torn off a farm building as well.						
EF0	WNW of Como to Eastern Elkhorn	Walworth	WI	42.6049°N 88.5176°W	01:10–01:17	6.04 mi (9.72 km)	150 yd (140 m)
EF0	This tornado touched down at the Geneva National Golf Club and moved north through the east side of Elkhorn. A storage facility had a significant amount of its roofing blown off, and trees were uprooted.						
EF1	Southern Salem	Marion	IL	38.6021°N 88.998°W	01:11–01:18	5.95 mi (9.58 km)	250 yd (230 m)
EF1	This tornado moved through the south side of Salem, where multiple homes had parts of their roofs torn off and one house was shifted off its foundation. Some commercial buildings in town had sections of their roofs and exterior walls torn off, an apartment building had siding removed, and some outbuildings were destroyed. A garage and a few more outbuildings were destroyed outside of town, and numerous trees were damaged or downed along the path as well.						
EF1	Northern Lombard to Addison	DuPage	IL	41.9072°N 88.0178°W	01:17–01:19	1.57 mi (2.53 km)	175 yd (160 m)
EF1	This tornado, which was embedded within the northern part of a much larger area of damaging straight-line winds, damaged several warehouses and office buildings as it moved from the northern part of Lombard into Addison. One brick warehouse had its roof and garage door damaged and had one of its exterior walls blown out. Trees and tree limbs were downed, a few of which landed on homes. Some power poles were leaned over as well.						
EF1	S of Stockland	Iroquois	IL	40.572°N 87.6122°W	01:20–01:24	4.84 mi (7.79 km)	300 yd (270 m)
EF1	A small outbuilding was destroyed, and trees and power poles were damaged.						
EF1	SE of Palmyra	Jefferson, Waukesha	WI	42.8588°N 88.5748°W	01:26–01:30	2.79 mi (4.49 km)	50 yd (46 m)
EF1	A tornado heavily damaged a house that was under construction and lofted debris for several hundred yards, some of which was embedded into the ground. Multiple trees were snapped as well.						
EF1	S of Mount Pleasant to S of Early Grove	Marshall	MS	34.9168°N 89.5176°W	01:27–01:37	8.11 mi (13.05 km)	100 yd (91 m)
EF1	Many trees were snapped and uprooted, including one tree that fell on and damaged the roof of a house.						
EF2	WNW of Oxford to NW of Badger Grove	Benton, White	IN	40.533°N 87.283°W	01:33–01:47	15.16 mi (24.40 km)	500 yd (460 m)
EF2	Two homes sustained significant damage, one of which had a section of its second story destroyed. Some other homes were damaged to a lesser degree, including one that had part of a silo thrown into it. Many trees and power poles were downed, and farm outbuildings were damaged or destroyed as well.						
EF2	S of Fowler to S of Remington	Benton	IN	40.578°N 87.3237°W	01:33–01:42	11.53 mi (18.56 km)	400 yd (370 m)
EF2	A strong tornado struck a wind farm, damaging several wind turbines, including one that was snapped and toppled to the ground. A blade from one of the turbines was found 600 yd (550 m) away from where it originated. Trees and power poles were downed, a house had part of its roof torn off, and grain bins were blown over. Sheds, barns, and outbuildings were also destroyed with debris strewn across fields.						
EF1	N of Wadena to ENE of Remington	Benton, Jasper	IN	40.7125°N 87.2775°W	01:41–01:50	10.22 mi (16.45 km)	500 yd (460 m)
EF1	Trees were downed, power poles were snapped, and several farm outbuildings were damaged or destroyed.						
EF1	Merrillville	Lake	IN	41.4779°N 87.3562°W	01:53–01:56	3.22 mi (5.18 km)	325 yd (297 m)
EF1	This tornado moved through Merrillville, where a few residences had their attached garages heavily damaged or destroyed. Multiple other homes sustained considerable roof damage and had windows blown out. Several trees and power lines were damaged as well.						
EF0	WSW of Smithson	White	IN	40.7151°N 86.8893°W	01:55–01:58	1.29 mi (2.08 km)	125 yd (114 m)
EF0	A short-lived tornado damaged a pole barn and tossed two empty silos. A wind turbine had one of its blades torn off.						
EF2	NW of Saulsbury to WSW of Hornsby	Hardeman	TN	35.0767°N 89.1092°W	01:55–02:09	12.78 mi (20.57 km)	450 yd (410 m)
EF2	This low-end EF2 tornado snapped or uprooted hundreds of large trees as it moved through wooded areas. A house had significant roof damage, and a few other residences sustained more minor damage.						
EF3	SW of Ste. Marie, IL to Southern Robinson, IL to Sullivan, IN	Jasper (IL), Crawford (IL), Sullivan (IN)	IL, IN	38.9018°N 88.0604°W	01:58–02:33	40.89 mi (65.81 km)	700 yd (640 m)
EF3	6 deaths – See article on this tornado – At least nine people were injured.						
EF0	SE of Hobart	Porter	IN	41.4853°N 87.1956°W	02:01–02:02	0.62 mi (1.00 km)	125 yd (114 m)
EF0	A brief, weak tornado caused damage to trees, outbuildings, and farm equipment.						
EF1	NNW of Lake Cicott to SW of Royal Center	Cass	IN	40.815°N 86.5572°W	02:13–02:16	1.73 mi (2.78 km)	300 yd (270 m)
EF1	A brief tornado damaged or destroyed multiple barns and power poles. A house was unroofed, the back garage portion of another home was damaged, and a fuel tank was rolled into a field.						
EF2	Southern Bethel Springs to Northern Adamsville to SSW of Lebanon	McNairy, Hardin	TN	35.2128°N 88.6067°W	02:30–02:51	18.91 mi (30.43 km)	800 yd (730 m)
EF2	A low-end EF2 tornado began on the south side of Bethel Springs, causing minor damage there before moving to the northeast and intensifying. A double-wide mobile home was destroyed, a church sustained significant roof damage and the collapse of an exterior wall, and several homes sustained extensive damage and had large portions of their roofs torn off. Many trees were downed, wooden power poles were snapped, and metal electrical transmission poles were bent to the ground. A fifth-wheel camper was rolled, and a few outbuildings were damaged or destroyed. Less than two hours later, a stronger and more destructive EF3 tornado moved through southern Bethel Springs, impacting the same area where this tornado touched down.						
EF0	SE of Bowers to S of Colfax	Montgomery, Boone	IN	40.1378°N 86.6963°W	02:43–02:45	1.77 mi (2.85 km)	50 yd (46 m)
EF0	This high-end EF0 tornado partially destroyed a barn with debris from the structure thrown up to 0.25 mi (0.40 km) away. Another older barn was shifted off its foundation and trees were damaged as well.						
EF2	E of Bowers to E of Manson	Montgomery, Boone, Clinton	IN	40.154°N 86.7171°W	02:43–02:53	10.55 mi (16.98 km)	100 yd (91 m)
EF2	Several farmsteads were damaged near Colfax, including one where a house was severely damaged. Two other homes sustained roof loss and some power poles were snapped. Many trees were snapped or uprooted, a few barns and silos were destroyed, and sheet metal debris was wrapped around trees. A large radio tower was toppled to the ground as well.						
EF3	ENE of Spencer to NNE of Mount Tabor	Owen, Monroe	IN	39.2978°N 86.7282°W	03:01–03:09	5.92 mi (9.53 km)	400 yd (370 m)
EF3	2 deaths – A strong tornado touched down in McCormick's Creek State Park and moved east-northeastward, snapping many hardwood trees and destroying numerous camper trailers, killing two people. The tornado reached its peak intensity of EF3 after exiting the park, severely damaging or destroying several frame homes. Some houses had total roof and exterior wall loss, a block foundation home was completely leveled, and multiple mobile homes and farm buildings were obliterated. Cars were tossed and mangled and pieces of farm machinery were thrown, including a 12-ton combine and a tractor that were lofted through the air. A few metal truss electrical transmission towers were blown over, and many large trees were snapped, stripped of their branches, and partially debarked. Some additional less intense roof and tree damage farther along the path before the tornado dissipated. In addition to the fatalities, two people were injured.						
EF0	NE of McLemoresville	Carroll	TN	36.0098°N 88.5391°W	03:10–03:11	1.33 mi (2.14 km)	50 yd (46 m)
EF0	Two houses had minor roof damage, and a small metal outbuilding had its roof panels torn off. Large tree branches were downed as well.						
EF0	S of Russiaville	Howard	IN	40.3967°N 86.2742°W	03:11–03:12	0.86 mi (1.38 km)	80 yd (73 m)
EF0	A brief tornado damaged a house, a barn, and some trees.						
EF2	Southern Martinsville to NW of Morgantown	Morgan	IN	39.3865°N 86.4618°W	03:12–03:22	8.6 mi (13.8 km)	200 yd (180 m)
EF2	A strong tornado impacted the southern edge of Martinsville immediately after touching down, partially to completely unroofing several homes in a subdivision near I-69, while other homes had shingles and siding torn off. A grain bin, a silo, and an outbuilding were also destroyed along the initial part of the path, and several trees were snapped. Near the end of its damage path, the tornado destroyed the second story of a house and damaged the roofs of several other homes. A pontoon boat was lofted from a small lake in this area and tossed roughly 440 yd (400 m) into a home, and a race car trailer was thrown 200 yd (180 m). Trees were snapped or damaged along the path as well.						
EF0	ENE of Russiaville	Howard	IN	40.4254°N 86.1946°W	03:15–03:17	0.14 mi (0.23 km)	10 yd (9.1 m)
EF0	A couple of homes sustained roof damage, one of which sustained extensive damage to its attached garage. A car was turned, a playground set was tossed, and pieces of wood were driven into siding or trees. Trees were damaged and a few small sheds were destroyed.						
EF1	E of Hemlock to E of Greentown	Howard	IN	40.419°N 86.0237°W	03:20–03:27	6.41 mi (10.32 km)	25 yd (23 m)
EF1	A high-end EF1 tornado destroyed a small barn and an adjacent manufactured home immediately after touching down, causing one serious injury. A car was flipped nearby, while a farmhouse and a larger barn had less severe damage. The tornado then continued to the northeast, damaging or destroying several other barns and outbuildings, snapping trees, and damaging homes, including one that sustained roof loss. Additional tree and roof damage occurred in a subdivision near Greentown before the tornado dissipated.						
EF0	S of Bargersville	Johnson	IN	39.4955°N 86.1738°W	03:27–03:31	1.93 mi (3.11 km)	25 yd (23 m)
EF0	Trees and power lines were damaged, and the metal roofing of a barn was peeled back.						
EF0	NE of Bruceton	Benton	TN	36.0984°N 88.1905°W	03:29–03:30	0.62 mi (1.00 km)	50 yd (46 m)
EF0	A brief, high-end EF0 tornado struck a metal outbuilding, ripping off most of its roof and collapsing its walls. Metal debris from the structure was lofted into trees, and a couple of tree branches were downed.						
EF2	Swayzee	Grant	IN	40.5062°N 85.8434°W	03:33–03:38	3.09 mi (4.97 km)	150 yd (140 m)
EF2	This strong tornado moved through downtown Swayzee, where a few brick businesses sustained collapse of their upper floor exterior walls, while other businesses and a church sustained roof damage. Numerous houses sustained considerable roof and exterior damage in residential areas, including one home that was shifted off its foundation. Swayzee Elementary School also had roof damage and mobile homes were pushed off their blocks, one of which was crushed and destroyed by a large tree. Multiple storage sheds were also destroyed, a car was moved, and a large metal silo at a grain facility in town was badly damaged as well. The tornado also impacted a couple of farmsteads just outside of town, where some barns and garages were damaged or destroyed and a house had minor roof damage. Numerous large trees and power poles were snapped along the path.						
EF3	Whiteland	Johnson	IN	39.5363°N 86.1042°W	03:33–03:41	5.48 mi (8.82 km)	316 yd (289 m)
EF3	This intense tornado moved directly through Whiteland, causing major damage to numerous homes, some of which were unroofed and had multiple exterior walls knocked down. A few homes were shifted off their foundations, one was left with a single wall standing, and a poorly anchored house was swept away with only its foundation remaining. Garages were destroyed while a cell tower, a library, and the Whiteland Fire Department were also damaged, and many trees were snapped or uprooted in town. The tornado reached its peak intensity just east of the town, where a large warehouse building that housed NFI Industries was largely destroyed. Debris from the building was strewn across I-65, and multiple nearby semi-trailers were tossed and destroyed. The tornado abruptly weakened and dissipated after crossing the interstate.						
EF2	Northeastern Fort Wayne to E of Cuba	Allen	IN	41.109°N 85.0286°W	03:36–03:43	7.86 mi (12.65 km)	400 yd (370 m)
EF2	A strong tornado touched down in the northeastern part of Fort Wayne, where many homes had roofing and siding torn off and numerous trees were snapped or uprooted, a few of which landed on houses. Fences and power lines were also downed, and a carpeting business was partially destroyed. A church had a portion of its roof removed, and some self-storage buildings sustained minor damage. The tornado reached its peak strength as it exited Fort Wayne and continued to the northeast, unroofing a few homes and a construction supply company. Barns, garages, and livestock buildings were completely destroyed with their debris strewn across fields. Significant tree damage occurred in rural areas as well, and many power poles were snapped to the south of Harlan before the tornado dissipated.						
EF3	Southeastern Gas City to N of Upland	Grant	IN	40.4811°N 85.5929°W	03:42–03:47	6.35 mi (10.22 km)	200 yd (180 m)
EF3	This intense tornado first touched down at the southeast edge of Gas City, initially causing minimal damage to a Walmart distribution center, trees, and power lines. Continuing to the northeast of town, the tornado reached its peak intensity as several houses were significantly damaged, some had roofs and exterior walls removed, and two poorly anchored homes collapsed. Multiple cars and RV trailers were tossed and rolled, while many large trees were snapped and twisted. Power poles were also snapped, while barns, sheds, and garages were destroyed. The tornado damaged a few more homes towards the end of its path, one of which had its roof removed. The top of a silo was blown off, and some additional garages and outbuildings were destroyed before the tornado dissipated.						
EF0	E of Harlan	Allen	IN	41.1961°N 84.9000°W	03:44–03:45	1.14 mi (1.83 km)	75 yd (69 m)
EF0	A brief tornado was confirmed, forming within a microburst shortly after the Fort Wayne EF2 tornado dissipated. Minor damage to homes and a barn was noted, with debris being thrown into nearby fields. Some tree damage occurred as well.						
EF0	NE of Antwerp	Paulding	OH	41.2016°N 84.6876°W	03:53–03:55	0.82 mi (1.32 km)	150 yd (140 m)
EF0	A brief tornado caused minor roof and siding damage to a few homes, and downed several trees.						
EF3	S of Hornsby to Southern Bethel Springs to Northern Adamsville to SE of Gordonsburg	Hardeman, McNairy, Hardin, Wayne, Lewis	TN	35.1559°N 88.8175°W	04:04–05:37	86.01 mi (138.42 km)	1,400 yd (1,300 m)
EF3	9 deaths – See article on this tornado – 23 people were injured.						
EF0	N of Salamonia	Jay	IN	40.3931°N 84.8827°W	04:19–04:22	1.54 mi (2.48 km)	175 yd (160 m)
EF0	Multiple empty grain bins were pushed over, blown off their foundations, or damaged by flying debris. Three newer barns were also damaged.						
EF0	NE of Portland to SW of Westchester	Jay	IN	40.4677°N 84.9436°W	04:20–04:23	2.44 mi (3.93 km)	100 yd (91 m)
EF0	Two barns sustained roof and wall damage, and sheet metal debris was lofted into trees. Power poles and trees were snapped as well.						
EF1	Eastern Louisville	Jefferson, Shelby	KY	38.2696°N 85.4967°W	04:30–04:34	3.98 mi (6.41 km)	130 yd (120 m)
EF1	A low-end EF1 tornado touched down in the eastern outskirts of Louisville, northeast of Middletown. It first struck a warehouse, peeling back a small part of the building and removing insulation. Elsewhere, a plastic surgery center sustained considerable roof damage, while some apartments and office buildings had minimal damage. A few street signs and light poles were bent over, and homes had minor shingle and gutter damage. Fencing was blown over, and dozens of trees were snapped or uprooted. The tornado crossed into Shelby County, causing sporadic tree damage at the Persimmon Ridge Golf Club before dissipating.						
EF0	NNW of St. Marys to WSW of Kossuth	Auglaize	OH	40.5952°N 84.4442°W	04:45–04:49	4.53 mi (7.29 km)	250 yd (230 m)
EF0	Shingles were ripped off a house and tree damage occurred. A grain bin, multiple hog barns, and outbuildings were destroyed.						
EF0	N of Osgood to Minster	Mercer, Auglaize	OH	40.3652°N 84.5002°W	04:45–04:53	8.36 mi (13.45 km)	200 yd (180 m)
EF0	This tornado touched down and moved to the northeast, damaging or destroying several barns and inflicting minor damage to a house. The tornado caused some minor damage to trees and structures in the northern part of Minster before it dissipated.						
EF0	ENE of New Paris to W of Hamburg	Preble	OH	39.8617°N 84.7751°W	04:47–04:49	2.61 mi (4.20 km)	150 yd (140 m)
EF0	A high-end EF0 tornado damaged several barns, including some barns that multiple walls knocked down. A home sustained minor damage and some trees were uprooted.						
EF1	Southeastern Wapakoneta to NNE of Waynesfield	Auglaize	OH	40.5345°N 84.2253°W	04:54–05:07	17.17 mi (27.63 km)	300 yd (270 m)
EF1	This tornado first touched down to the southwest of Wapakoneta, initially downing a few trees and destroying a barn. It then reached high-end EF1 intensity as it struck the southeast edge of town, where a large commercial greenhouse was leveled and a couple of industrial buildings were heavily damaged, one of which sustained collapse of an exterior wall. A truck stop was also significantly damaged and several semi-trailers were overturned at that location, while multiple RVs were tossed around at a nearby campground, injuring seven people. A large meeting hall building at the campground had its roof removed, and trees were downed. Light posts were also knocked over, and several power poles were snapped in this area as well. The tornado continued into rural areas outside of Wapakoneta and passed near Uniopolis before it dissipated farther to the northeast, destroying a couple of barns and an old historic brick schoolhouse. Several homes were also damaged, one of which had a large part of its roof torn off.						

== See also ==
- Tornadoes of 2023
- List of United States tornadoes from January to February 2023
- List of United States tornadoes from April to May 2023
