= Early-March 2023 North American storm complex =

Tornado outbreak in the Southern United States

Early March 2023 North American storm complex

Meteorological history
- Formed: March 1, 2023
- Dissipated: March 4, 2023

Tornado outbreak
- Tornadoes: 35
- Max. rating: EF2 tornado
- Highest gusts: Tornadic – 135 mph (217 km/h) (EF2 Kirby, Arkansas tornado); Non-tornadic – 95 mph (153 km/h) (Marshall, Texas (March 2) and Fryeburg, Louisiana (March 3) straight-line winds)
- Largest hail: 4 in (10 cm)

Winter storm
- Max. snowfall: 31 in (79 cm), 2 miles (3.2 km) WSW of Downtown Flagstaff, Arizona

Overall effects
- Casualties: 13 non-tornadic, 17+ injuries (9 tornadic)
- Damage: $5.8 billion (2023 USD)
- Areas affected: Southwestern United States, Southeastern United States, Northeastern United States
- Power outages: >1,500,000
- Part of the tornadoes and tornado outbreaks of 2023 and 2022–23 North American winter

An intense low-pressure system produced widespread impacts across the United States in early March 2023. Additionally, an outbreak of 35 tornadoes affected 12 states from the Southern United States to the Great Lakes. In all, the storm system killed 13 people due to flooding and strong winds. At least 17 other people were injured.

== Impact ==
Map plotting the storm's track and intensity, according to the Saffir–Simpson scale Map key Saffir–Simpson scale Tropical depression (≤38 mph, ≤62 km/h) Tropical storm (39–73 mph, 63–118 km/h) Category 1 (74–95 mph, 119–153 km/h) Category 2 (96–110 mph, 154–177 km/h) Category 3 (111–129 mph, 178–208 km/h) Category 4 (130–156 mph, 209–251 km/h) Category 5 (≥157 mph, ≥252 km/h) Unknown Storm type Tropical cyclone Subtropical cyclone Extratropical cyclone, remnant low, tropical disturbance, or monsoon depression

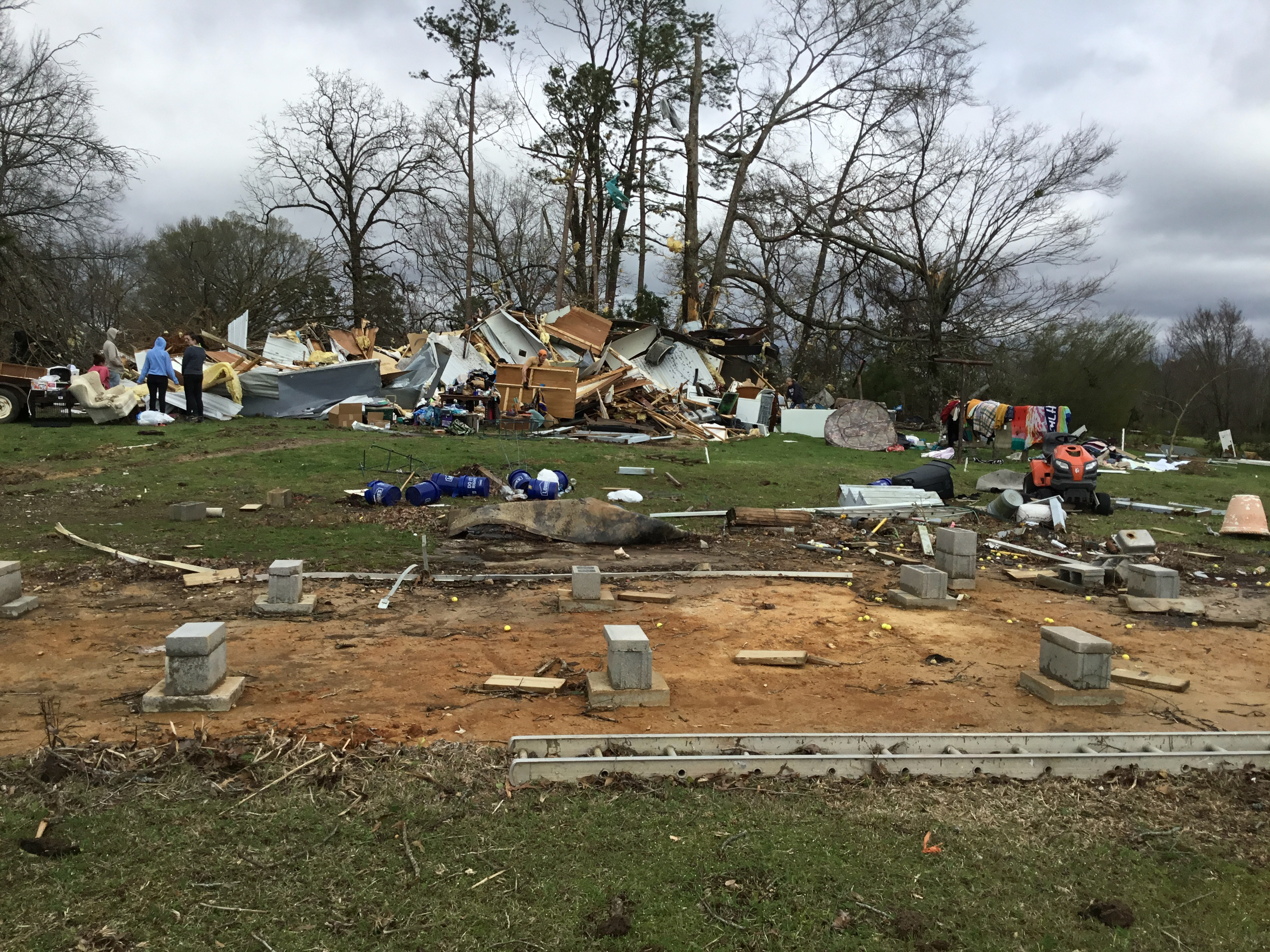
A mobile home that was destroyed by a high-end EF2 tornado near Kirby, Arkansas.

=== Western United States ===
On March 1, the snowstorm in Arizona led to many pileups, and several roads such as I-40, I-17, and US 93 closed. In addition, I-80 closed from Applegate, California to the Nevada state line. In Nevada, portions of US 93, I-11 and I-15 were shut down as well, as well as several state highways. On March 1, the Northern Arizona University cancelled all in person classes. Joshua Tree National Park temporarily closed due to the inclement weather, and the San Bernardino National Forest shut down for two weeks. All park roads in Mojave National Preserve were shut down, and partial closures also occurred in Redwood National Park, Sequoia National Park, Kings Canyon National Park and Death Valley National Park. A supermarket in Crestline, California collapsed due to the snow. One person was killed due to the storm in California. Further east, I-40 westbound lanes was also shut down in Gallup, New Mexico. In the state of Idaho, portions of US 20 were shut down as well.

=== Southern United States ===
On March 1, hail fell in north Texas, some of which were up to half-dollar size. Hail fell in Dilley, Texas, causing damage to windows and cars, as well as a severe thunderstorm warning for softball sized hail in Pearsall, Texas. On March 2, severe storms led to a ground stop at Dallas Fort Worth International Airport. On March 3, the storm led to the lowest pressure on record in Louisville and Bowling Green, Kentucky. Mammoth Caves National Park was shut down on March 4 due to storm damage. Nearly 400,000 residents in Kentucky alone lost power, with over 1800 being placed under boil water advisories. The storm resulted in five people being killed in Kentucky, three in Alabama, two in Tennessee, one in Mississippi, and one in Arkansas.

=== Eastern United States ===
On March 3, snow led to many snow emergencies in the Albany, New York metropolitan area and near Pittsfield, Massachusetts. Ultimately, 7.8 in (20 cm) of snow fell in Albany. 72,700 customers in eastern New York lost power due to the winter storm. On the night of March 3, WestJet cancelled all flights out of Toronto Pearson Airport due to the snow. The snowstorm also shut down Detroit Metro Airport on the night of March 3, and a ground stop was imposed at Atlanta Hartsfield-Jackson International Airport due to severe weather. Over 100 flights were cancelled due to the storm at Boston Logan International Airport. The Maine Turnpike had a speed restriction as a result of the storm. Between March 3 and 4, up to 1.49 in (38 mm) of rain fell in Newark, New Jersey, with 1.14 in (29 mm) of rain falling in New York City.

== Tornado outbreak ==
=== March 1 ===
While confidence for a widespread severe weather outbreak increased for March 2, an enhanced risk for severe weather, including the possibility for a few strong/EF2+ tornadoes, was issued for March 1. A large capping inversion, placed along northern Louisiana, was expected to contain the atmosphere from initiating convective activity, but the presence of moisture, daytime heating in the area, and steep mid-level lapse rates, made the environment favorable for severe weather, including the possibility for supercells capable of all hazards. Given the favorable parameters in place, the Storm Prediction Center (SPC) issued a large corridor, extending from extreme northeastern Texas, most of central Arkansas, northwestern Mississippi, and southwestern Tennessee, were the highest probabilities for tornadoes were located. A slight risk, lined with a 5% risk for tornadoes, was issued around the main area of concern, and extended into central Tennessee, and northern Alabama. A large, 30% risk for strong, damaging wind gusts was also placed along central and eastern portions of Arkansas, extending into northwest Mississippi and southwest Tennessee, as was a hatched corridor for very large hail was also introduced for this corridor.

=== March 2 ===
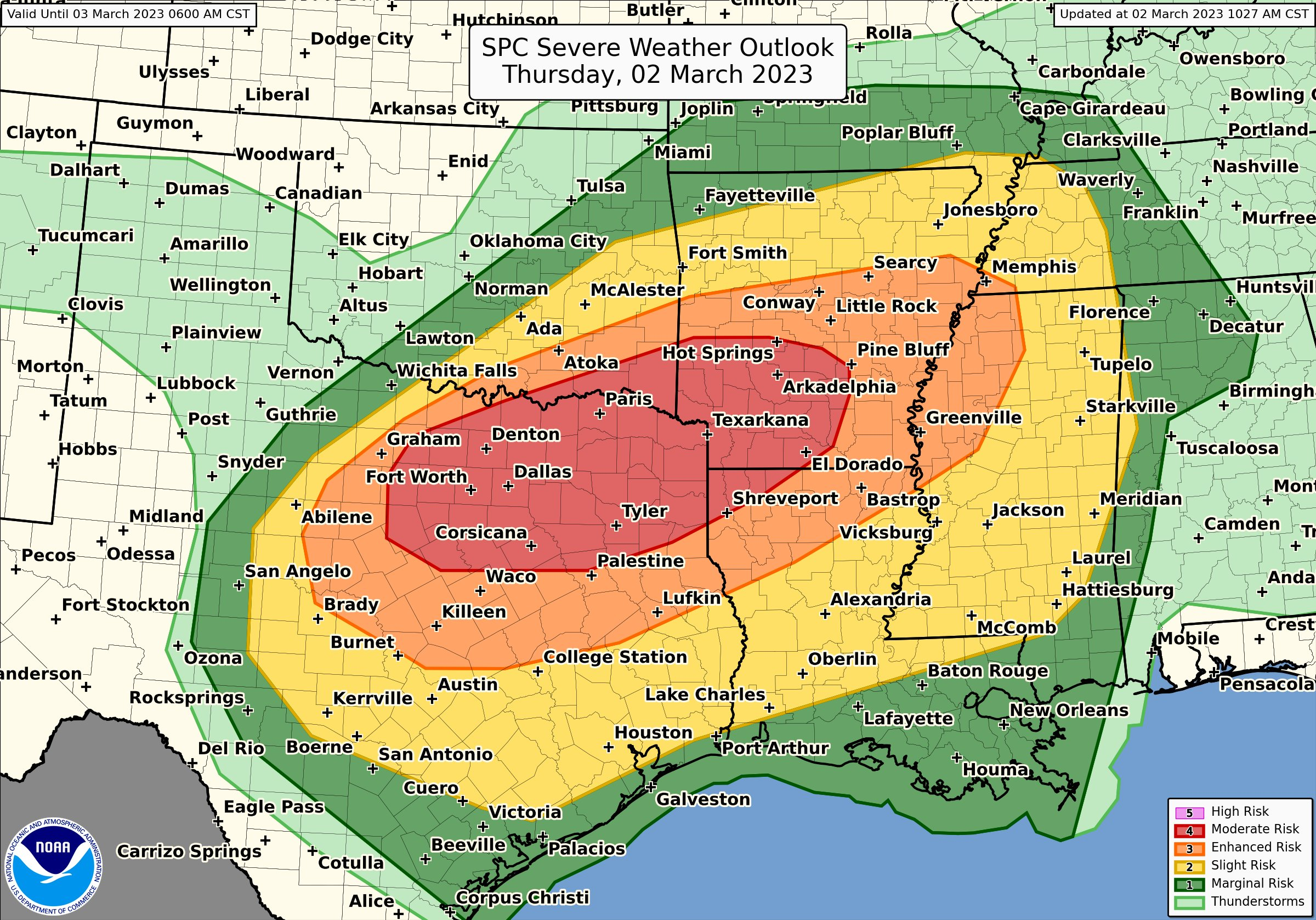
The Storm Prediction Center's Severe Weather Outlook for March 2, 2023

As a large, widespread, and damaging storm complex event was occurring throughout the Great Plains, which unleashed powerful damaging winds and tornadoes across Texas, Oklahoma, and Kansas, the SPC highlighted a potential area for the risk of severe weather in the following days, with the main, 30% area for severe weather centered around eastern Texas, northern Louisiana, southern Arkansas, middle portions of Mississippi, and western Alabama, as conditions were expected to be very favorable for the development of thunderstorms capable of all severe weather hazards.

After introducing a massive level 3/enhanced risk for March 2 on February 28, which now included portions of southeastern Oklahoma, the SPC upped the threat to a level 4/moderate risk, throughout a corridor centered along the Ark-La-Tex region, clipping into extreme southeastern Oklahoma, on March 1. Throughout the risk area, the environmentally favorable conditions for severe weather were set in motion due to the presence of abundant moisture, instability that was expected ahead of a cold front starting from north-central Texas, and intense wind shear prevalent across the entire region. With this setup, a linear cluster of discrete supercell thunderstorms was expected to develop, and given the favorable wind and instability patterns, a 15%, hatched risk for strong/EF2+ tornadoes was placed along the moderate risk area, while a large, surrounding 10% hatched risk for strong tornadoes was placed and extended into central portions of Arkansas, and all the way into northwestern Mississippi. At the 1630 UTC update on March 2, however, the 15% hatched area was removed due to lingering uncertainty about the timing of the most favorable wind shear for tornadoes versus the convective mode of the ongoing storms. Despite this, a moderate risk remained due to a 45% hatched risk for damaging winds and 45% hatched area for large hail that had also been issued.

=== March 3 ===
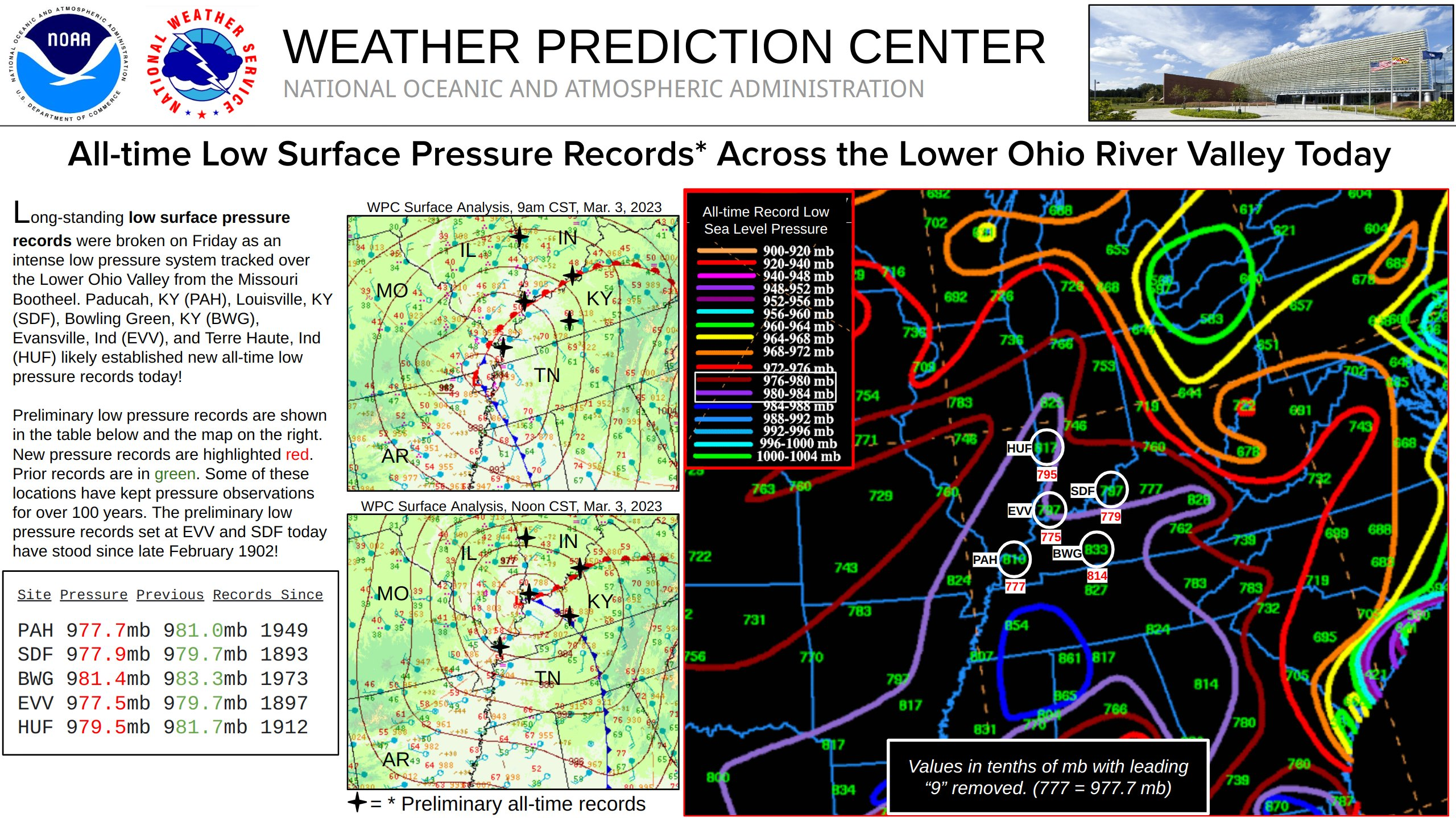
March 3, 2023, Record Low Pressure

== Confirmed tornadoes ==
Confirmed tornadoes by Enhanced Fujita rating
EFU	EF0	EF1	EF2	EF3	EF4	EF5	Total
0	11	22	2	0	0	0	35

=== March 1 event ===
List of confirmed tornadoes – Wednesday, March 1, 2023 (Note: All dates are based on the local time zone where the tornado touched down; however, all times are in Coordinated Universal Time for consistency.)
EF#	Location	County / parish	State	Start coord.	Time (UTC)	Path length	Max. width
EF1	Shottsville to SW of Pigeye	Marion	AL	34.2608°N 88.1254°W	03:54–04:07	10.1 mi (16.3 km)	500 yd (460 m)
EF1	This tornado touched down in Shottsville where a church sustained exterior damage. Elsewhere, a home sustained damage to its metal roof and numerous trees were snapped or uprooted, one of which fell on a barn.						
EF1	NE of Hazel Green	Madison	AL	34.9504°N 86.5074°W	04:32–04:33	0.14 mi (0.23 km)	25 yd (23 m)
EF1	A very brief and narrow high-end EF1 tornado damaged the roofs of several homes in a subdivision to the northeast of Hazel Green, including one home that had a large portion of its attached garage roof removed, causing a wall to blow out. A pickup truck was tipped over onto its side and a small portion of a fence was knocked down as well.						

=== March 2 event ===
List of confirmed tornadoes – Thursday, March 2, 2023
EF#	Location	County / parish	State	Start coord.	Time (UTC)	Path length	Max. width
EF0	W of Signal Mountain	Marion	TN	35.1014°N 85.4777°W	12:16–12:17	0.26 mi (0.42 km)	100 yd (91 m)
EF0	A brief tornado downed a swath of trees in Prentice Cooper State Forest.						
EF0	W of Georgetown	Hamilton, Meigs	TN	35.288°N 84.9925°W	11:55–11:59	2.21 mi (3.56 km)	100 yd (91 m)
EF0	Homes sustained minor damage, a barn lost its roof, and trees and power lines were downed.						
EF1	Pickton	Hopkins	TX	32.9816°N 95.4209°W	21:20–21:28	8.15 mi (13.12 km)	75 yd (69 m)
EF1	This narrow high-end EF1 tornado caused considerable damage as it moved directly through Pickton, inflicting roof damage to several homes, businesses, and a church. Trees were damaged along the path as well.						
EF0	N of Mount Vernon	Franklin	TX	33.2837°N 95.2662°W	23:00–23:11	5.43 mi (8.74 km)	100 yd (91 m)
EF0	Several tree limbs were downed.						
EF1	WNW of Jefferson	Marion	TX	32.7662°N 94.4203°W	23:05–23:10	3.25 mi (5.23 km)	400 yd (370 m)
EF1	A few outbuildings were damaged or destroyed. Several trees were snapped or uprooted, some of which caused damage to homes and other structures upon falling.						
EF1	NW of McLeod	Cass	TX	32.9747°N 94.1211°W	23:34–23:35	1.22 mi (1.96 km)	475 yd (434 m)
EF1	Many trees were snapped or downed, some of which caused damage to homes and other structures upon falling. A few outbuildings were damaged as well.						
EF1	Southeastern Shreveport	Caddo	LA	32.3627°N 93.7087°W	23:35–23:40	4.76 mi (7.66 km)	100 yd (91 m)
EF1	An EF1 tornado moved through southeastern sections of Shreveport, touching down and lifting several times along an intermittent path. In all, 98 homes sustained damage to their roofs, windows, and chimneys, including one home that had a large section of its roof torn off. Four businesses were also damaged and an apartment building sustained minor damage as well. Additional damage occurred to light poles, signs, fences, trampolines, and basketball hoops. Numerous trees were snapped or uprooted, including on the campus of Louisiana State University Shreveport. Two people sustained minor injuries in a vehicle. Damage totaled $50 million.						
EF1	WSW of Fouke	Miller	AR	33.2277°N 93.9945°W	23:58–00:02	1.82 mi (2.93 km)	475 yd (434 m)
EF1	A high-end EF1 tornado occurred near the Sulphur River Wildlife Management Area, damaging or destroying several outbuildings. Additional homes and other structures were also damaged, mainly from downed tree limbs and trees.						
EF1	NW of Broken Bow	McCurtain	OK	34.0342°N 94.8123°W	03:05–03:11	4.85 mi (7.81 km)	390 yd (360 m)
EF1	Trees were uprooted, some of which caused structural damage upon falling.						
EF2	NNE of Kirby	Pike	AR	34.2542°N 93.6426°W	04:50–04:53	1.8 mi (2.9 km)	300 yd (270 m)
EF2	This high-end EF2 tornado completely destroyed two chicken houses at the beginning of its path. Elsewhere, a frame home had part of its roof torn off and a tied-down mobile home was destroyed after being lofted and tossed 100 ft (30 m) into a wooded area. Many large trees were snapped or uprooted along the path, one of which landed on and destroyed a mobile home. A few other mobile homes were also damaged, one of which was shifted off its foundation blocks. A house sustained minor damage from falling trees shortly before the tornado dissipated. Five people were injured.						
EF1	N of Appleby	Nacogdoches	TX	31.7226°N 94.6396°W	04:51–04:58	3.09 mi (4.97 km)	1,000 yd (910 m)
EF1	Large trees were snapped or uprooted along the path of this large tornado.						

=== March 3 event ===
List of confirmed tornadoes – Friday, March 3, 2023
EF#	Location	County / parish	State	Start coord.	Time (UTC)	Path length	Max. width
EF0	E of Fryeburg	Bienville	LA	32.4124°N 93.2224°W	06:38–06:40	2.4 mi (3.9 km)	50 yd (46 m)
EF0	A high-end EF0 tornado embedded with a larger area of damaging straight-line winds damaged the roof of a manufactured home and snapped or uprooted trees.						
EF0	NW of Carthage to SE of Leola	Dallas	AR	34.0892°N 92.6149°W	06:43-06:47	4.3 mi (6.9 km)	100 yd (91 m)
EF0	A weak tornado broke limbs and downed pine trees.						
EF0	E of Altheimer	Jefferson	AR	34.3046°N 91.7699°W	07:57–07:58	0.7 mi (1.1 km)	50 yd (46 m)
EF0	Trees were damaged by this brief, weak tornado.						
EF1	SE of Kirkville	Itawamba	MS	34.3987°N 88.3913°W	15:30–15:33	2.27 mi (3.65 km)	125 yd (114 m)
EF1	This tornado caused significant damage to pine trees. Three houses and an outbuilding sustained roof damage and numerous metal roof panels were tossed into nearby trees.						
EF2	S of Hendron	McCracken	KY	36.95°N 88.61°W	17:08–17:10	1.49 mi (2.40 km)	175 yd (160 m)
EF2	A strong tornado struck the small community of Fremont, causing significant damage. Multiple homes were damaged and a few had their roofs torn off, one of which sustained some exterior wall loss as well. A large garage structure was heavily damaged along with a church housed in an old school building. Numerous trees and power poles were snapped, multiple outbuildings were completely destroyed, debris was scattered across the ground, and a couple of businesses sustained roof and exterior damage.						
EF1	SE of Sturgis	Union	KY	37.52°N 87.96°W	18:00–18:06	6.73 mi (10.83 km)	100 yd (91 m)
EF1	Three separate, large barns were severely damaged. Several trees were snapped or uprooted and dozens of tree limbs were also downed.						
EF1	SE of Old Shawneetown, IL	Union	KY	37.66°N 88.11°W	18:02–18:03	1.76 mi (2.83 km)	100 yd (91 m)
EF1	A couple of homes sustained minor roof and fascia damage. Parts of roofing and fascia were also ripped from a small convenience store. Additionally, part of the roof was torn off a large outbuilding. Several trees were snapped or damaged.						
EF0	E of Old Shawneetown, IL	Union	KY	37.69°N 88.06°W	18:04–18:08	3.62 mi (5.83 km)	25 yd (23 m)
EF0	Large tree limbs were downed.						
EF1	W of Smith Mills	Henderson	KY	37.77°N 87.78°W	18:17–18:19	2.14 mi (3.44 km)	125 yd (114 m)
EF1	A metal farm outbuilding was destroyed and several trees suffered extensive limb damage.						
EF1	NW of Kasson to Saint Joseph	Vanderburgh	IN	38.03°N 87.65°W	18:38–18:40	2.76 mi (4.44 km)	100 yd (91 m)
EF1	A tornado caused generally minor damage to the roofs and fascia of homes in and around Saint Joseph; however, the roof was completely ripped off of Saint Joseph Catholic Church. Dozens of trees were snapped, uprooted, or had broken limbs as well.						
EF1	Northern Section to N of Dutton	Jackson	AL	34.5891°N 85.9949°W	18:39–18:43	5.04 mi (8.11 km)	105 yd (96 m)
EF1	This tornado touched down in Section and moved to the northeast. A manufactured home was overturned while other manufactured homes suffered damaged to their underpinnings and roofs. A home sustained minor damage, metal roofing was removed from a chicken house, many power lines were downed, and trees were snapped or uprooted as well.						
EF0	N of Darmstadt to S of Stacer	Vanderburgh	IN	38.12°N 87.58°W	18:45–18:47	2.14 mi (3.44 km)	50 yd (46 m)
EF0	A few homes sustained roof and fascia damage. Several large tree limbs were downed.						
EF1	Southeastern Pisgah to W of Rosalie	Jackson	AL	34.6785°N 85.8392°W	18:47–18:50	3.17 mi (5.10 km)	50 yd (46 m)
EF1	This brief tornado formed shortly after the EF1 Section tornado dissipated, touching down at the southeast edge of Pisgah. It uprooted several trees and inflicted minor roof damage to chicken houses before dissipating.						
EF1	E of Dale to NNE of Johnsburg	Spencer, Dubois	IN	38.17°N 86.97°W	19:07–19:15	5.25 mi (8.45 km)	100 yd (91 m)
EF1	A large barn had about half its roof ripped off. A couple of houses sustained roof and fascia damage, including one that had multiple windows blown out as well, while a nearby TV antenna on the property was bent at its base. A semi-trailer was overturned on I-64 and a metal farm building was damaged. Several large trees were snapped, uprooted, or had their limbs downed.						
EF1	Northern Duff to Northwestern Jasper	Dubois	IN	38.329°N 87.027°W	19:11–19:18	7.3 mi (11.7 km)	400 yd (370 m)
EF1	This tornado first touched down at the north edge of the small community of Duff. Multiple homes sustained minor roof and siding damage while barns were heavily damaged or destroyed, including one barn that was left with only one wall standing. Further to the northeast, many trees were snapped or uprooted in the northwestern part of Jasper before the tornado dissipated.						
EF1	N of Sonoraville	Gordon	GA	34.4595°N 84.8336°W	20:08–20:12	3.69 mi (5.94 km)	150 yd (140 m)
EF1	An outbuilding was destroyed, a barn was largely destroyed, and numerous trees were snapped or uprooted. Several power lines were snapped as well.						
EF1	S of Kent	Jefferson	IN	38.703°N 85.557°W	20:29–20:31	1.66 mi (2.67 km)	120 yd (110 m)
EF1	A tornado snapped, uprooted, or twisted numerous trees west of Hanover. Six outbuildings and older barns were significantly damaged or destroyed. A brick home sustained severe roof damage, had windows blown out, and had its TV antenna snapped as well.						
EF0	W of Bethel	Clermont	OH	38.9590°N 84.1280°W	22:05–22:07	1.29 mi (2.08 km)	200 yd (180 m)
EF0	Numerous homes and outbuildings sustained minor siding and fascia damage. Trees were snapped or uprooted as well, including one that fell on a home.						
EF1	NW of Mowrystown to SSE of New Vienna	Highland	OH	39.1159°N 83.8178°W	22:26–22:40	14.16 mi (22.79 km)	400 yd (370 m)
EF1	This tornado caused significant damage to several barns and a mobile home shortly after touching down. After moving to the northeast and causing some minor damage to trees and a few structures, the tornado strengthened again as it struck the Pricetown community, where several homes suffered considerable roof damage, one of which had its attached garage torn off and mostly flattened. The tornado then weakened and may have lifted briefly as it continued north-northeast through mostly open fields, causing only minor tree damage and downing a power pole. The tornado then strengthened again as it crossed US 50, where a church had much of its roof ripped off and some outbuildings were damaged and trees and tree limbs were downed. It then weakened momentarily, but strengthened again as it struck the Willettsville community, inflicting roof damage to numerous homes and outbuildings, and including another home that had its attached garage collapsed. The tornado then weakened for the final time and continued northeastward, causing some additional minor tree and roof damage before dissipating.						
EF0	S of New Vienna	Highland	OH	39.2751°N 83.7166°W	22:35–22:37	0.9 mi (1.4 km)	150 yd (140 m)
EF0	This brief tornado was likely a satellite to the previous tornado. A shed was largely destroyed, a few homes sustained minor roof and siding damage, and some trees were damaged as well.						
EF0	WNW of Frankfort	Ross	OH	39.4107°N 83.2021°W	23:13–23:14	0.85 mi (1.37 km)	50 yd (46 m)
EF0	A brief tornado snapped or uprooted multiple trees. A concession stand sustained minor roof damage and a chain-link fence was damaged as well.						
EF1	NNW of Hickory Tavern to Gray Court to NNW of Cross Anchor	Laurens, Spartanburg	SC	34.589°N 82.226°W	00:14–00:37	21.27 mi (34.23 km)	50 yd (46 m)
EF1	This weak and narrow but long-lived tornado struck the communities of Gray Court and Lanford directly. Damage along its path mainly consisted of dozens of trees being snapped or uprooted, including multiple trees that fell onto homes.						

== See also ==
- Weather of 2023
- List of North American tornadoes and tornado outbreaks
