= McLeod High School =

Location
- 19395 West FM 125; McLeod, Texas 75556; United States; 32.945097°N 94.083554°W

Information
- School type: Public high school
- School district: McLeod Independent School District
- Principal: Jenifer Lance
- Teaching staff: 9.86 (FTE)
- Grades: 9-12
- Enrollment: 428 (2023–2024)
- Student to teacher ratio: 11.05
- Colors: Maroon & Gold
- Athletics conference: UIL Class AA
- Mascot: Longhorn
- Yearbook: Longhorn
- Website: McLeod High School

McLeod High School is a public high school located in the unincorporated community of McLeod, Texas and classified as a 2A school by the UIL. It is a part of the McLeod Independent School District located in southeastern Cass County. For the 2021-2022 school year, the school was given an "A" by the Texas Education Agency.

== Athletics ==
The McLeod Longhorns compete in these sports -

- Baseball
- Basketball
- Cross Country
- Golf
- Softball
- Tennis
- Track and Field
