= Kasson =

Kasson may refer to:

== People ==
- Burt Z. Kasson (1877–1943), New York politician
- John A. Kasson (1822–1910), Iowa politician and lawyer
- Kasson Crooker, electronic music composer from Boston, Massachusetts
- Jabez Hyde Kasson (1820-1891), The City of Kasson, Minnesota was named after Jabez Hyde Kasson who was the owner of the original town site

== Places in the United States ==
- Kasson, Indiana
- Kasson, Minnesota
- Kasson, West Virginia
- Kasson Brook, Pennsylvania
- Kasson Township, Michigan
