= Bogus Springs, Texas =

Unincorporated community in Texas, US

Coordinates: 32.945085°N 94.087325°W

Bogus Springs, also known as Baugus Springs, is a ghost town in Cass County, Texas, United States. It is located approximately 1 mile (1.6 km) from McLeod. The settlement was abandoned by 1986.
