= McLeod Independent School District =

School district in Texas

Address
- 19395 Farm Rd 125 McLeod, Texas, 75565-0350; United States

District information
- Type: Public
- Grades: PK–12
- Superintendent: Jennifer Lance
- Governing agency: Texas Education Agency
- Schools: 3
- NCES District ID: 4829910

Students and staff
- Enrollment: 414 (2022–2023)
- Teachers: 35.97 (on an FTE basis)
- Student–teacher ratio: 11.51

Other information
- Website: www.mcleodisd.net

McLeod Independent School District is a public school district based in the community of McLeod, Texas (USA).

The district has three sections consisting of three wings on a single campus.

- McLeod High School (Grades 9–12)
- McLeod Middle (Grades 6–8)
- McLeod Elementary (Grades PK-6), 2023 National Blue Ribbon School

In 2009, the school district was rated "recognized" by the Texas Education Agency.
