= German Township, Vanderburgh County, Indiana =

German Township Vanderburgh County
- Township
- Location in Vanderburgh County
- Coordinates: 38°02′36″N 87°38′38″W
- Country: United States
- State: Indiana
- County: Vanderburgh

Government
  - Type: Indiana township

Area
  - Total: 28.84 sq mi (74.7 km^{2})
  - Land: 28.56 sq mi (74.0 km^{2})
  - Water: 0.28 sq mi (0.73 km^{2}) 0.97%
- Elevation: 479 ft (146 m)

Population (2020)
  - Total: 7,167
  - Density: 260.6/sq mi (100.6/km^{2})
- ZIP codes: 47712, 47720
- GNIS feature ID: 453328

German Township is one of eight townships in Vanderburgh County, Indiana, United States. As of the 2010 census, its population was 7,441 and it contained 2,909 housing units.

German Township was organized in 1845.

== Geography ==
According to the 2010 census, the township has a total area of 28.84 square miles (74.7 km^{2}), of which 28.56 square miles (74.0 km^{2}) (or 99.03%) is land and 0.28 square miles (0.73 km^{2}) (or 0.97%) is water.

=== Cities and towns ===
- Darmstadt (far west edge)

=== Unincorporated towns ===
- Kasson
- Saint Joseph

=== Adjacent townships ===
- Vanderburgh County
  - Armstrong Township (North)
  - Scott Township (Northeast)
  - Center Township (East)
  - Perry Township (South)
- Posey County
  - Robinson Township (West)
  - Marrs Township (Single Point)

=== Cemeteries ===
The township contains these cemeteries: Higinbottom, Huber, Richter, Saint Peters, St. Joseph, and St. Paul's.

== School districts ==
- Evansville-Vanderburgh School Corporation

== Political districts ==
- Indiana's 8th congressional district
- State House District 76
- State Senate District 49
