= Saint Joseph, Vanderburgh County, Indiana =

Saint Joseph
- Unincorporated community
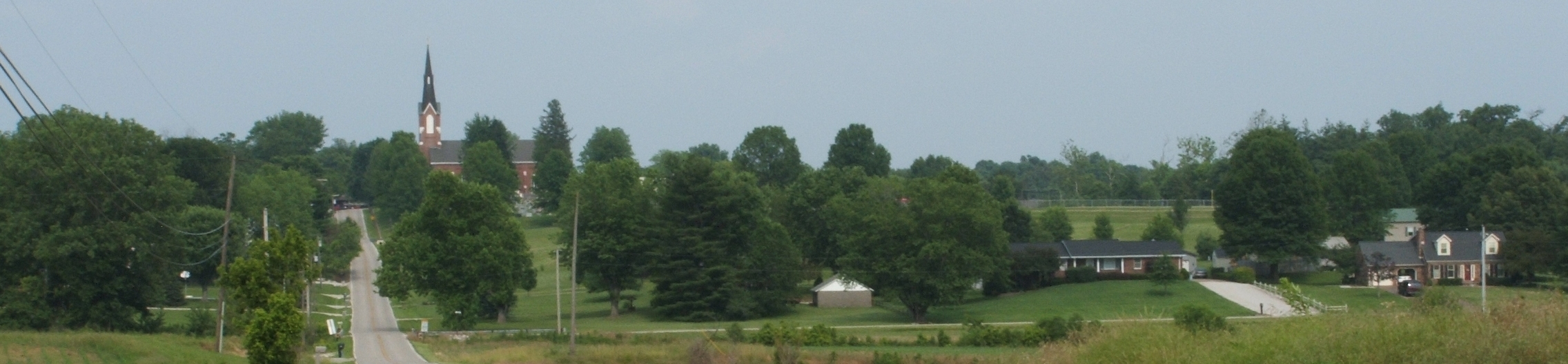
- Nickname: St. Joe County
- Location within Indiana Location within the United States
- Coordinates: 38°03′58″N 87°38′49″W
- Country: United States
- State: Indiana
- County: Vanderburgh
- Township: German
- Saint Joseph: 1867
- Founder: German immigrants, 1841
- Named for: St. Joseph Catholic Church
- Elevation: 545 ft (166 m)
- Time zone: UTC-6 (CST)
  - Summer (DST): UTC-5 (CDT)
- ZIP code: 47720
- Area code: 812
- GNIS feature ID: 442618

Saint Joseph, affectionately called St. Joe County by locals, is an unincorporated community in German Township, Vanderburgh County, Indiana, United States and centered on St. Joseph Catholic Church. Along with that of Darmstadt, its colonization marked the beginning of German-American immigration to southern Indiana. The area was chosen as a settlement for its rich farmland.

== Name ==
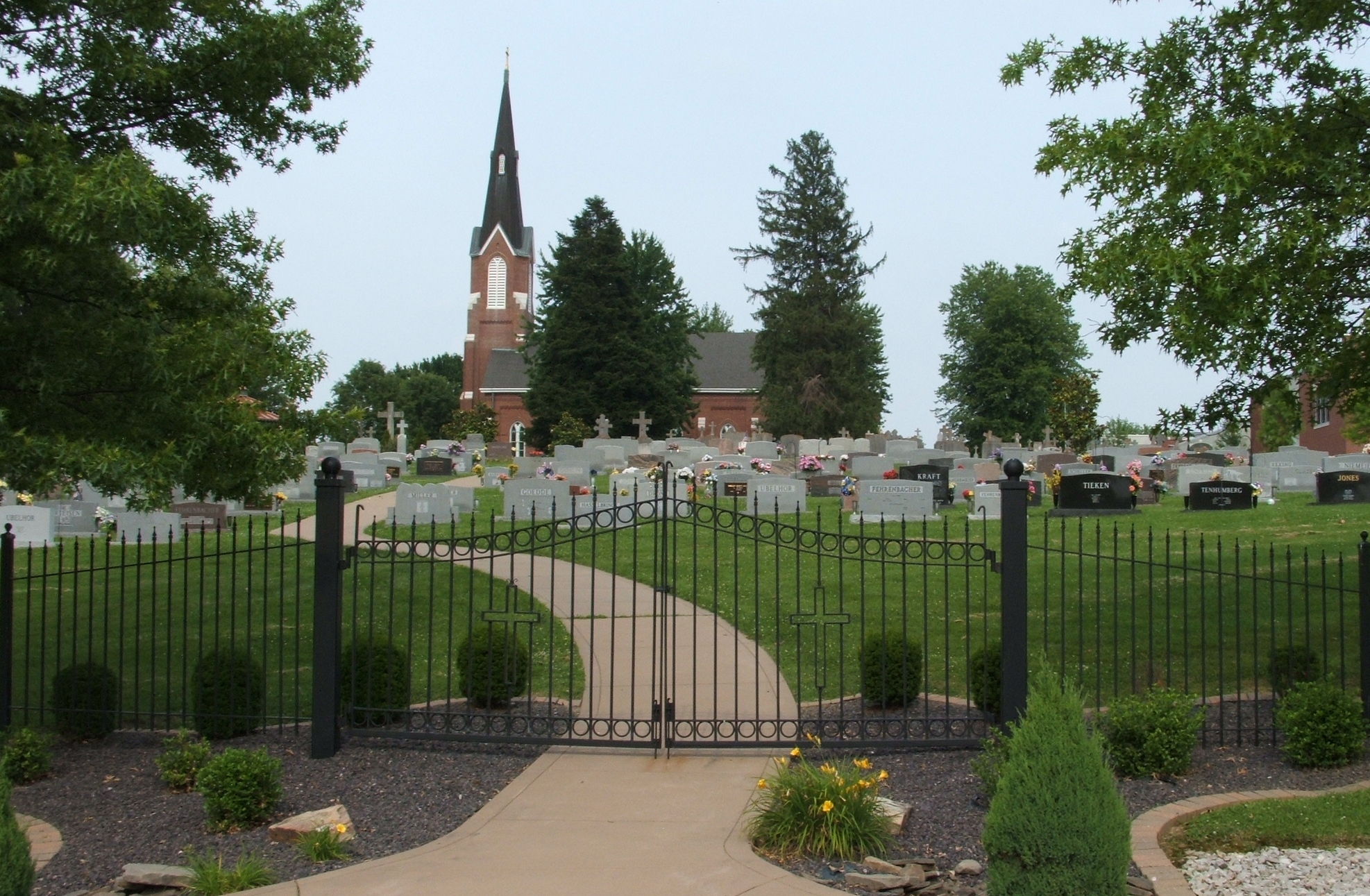
St. Joseph Catholic Church, after which the town is named.

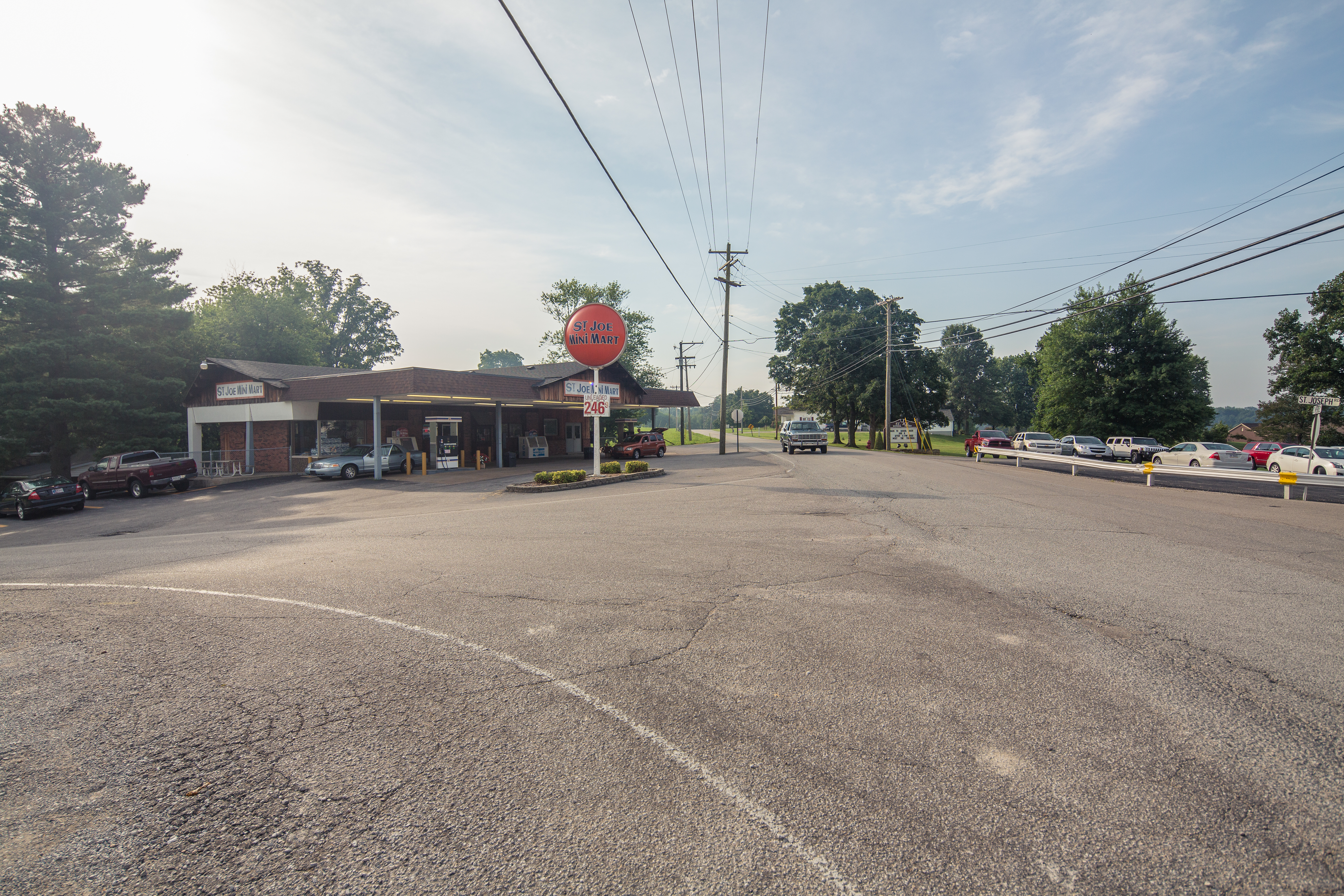
Saint Joseph, Indiana

The town is named after the church in its center, St. Joseph Catholic Church. The church is named for the Saint Joseph the Carpenter, the father of Jesus. Unlike most other local communities, St. Joseph has never had a railway station.

The nickname "St. Joe County" originates from the fact that there are multiple churches by the name of St. Joseph in the Roman Catholic Diocese of Evansville and Vincennes, and different names were needed to distinguish one from the next in conversation and on paperwork. The church is referred to as "St. Joe in the County", referring to the fact that the other St. Joseph Catholic Churches are located in Evansville ("St. Joe [in the] City") and Jasper "St. Joe [in] Jasper"). The name is frequently truncated to "St. Joe County", and members of the diocese have come to know the town as "St. Joe County".
