= Fryeburg, Louisiana =

- Unincorporated community
- Location within Louisiana Location within the United States
- Coordinates: 32°24′47″N 93°14′04″W
- Country: United States
- State: Louisiana
- Parish: Bienville
- Elevation: 259 ft (79 m)
- Time zone: UTC-6 (Central (CST))
  - Summer (DST): UTC-5 (CDT)
- Area code: 318
- GNIS feature ID: 554493

Fryeburg is an unincorporated community in Bienville Parish, Louisiana, United States.
