= Pickton, Texas =

Unincorporated community in Texas, US

Coordinates: 33°01′41″N 95°23′35″W

Pickton is an unincorporated community in Hopkins County, Texas, United States. Despite being unincorporated, Pickton has its own post office, with the ZIP code 75471.

== Education ==
Public education in the community of Pickton is provided by the Como-Pickton Consolidated Independent School District.
