= Kirkville, Itawamba County, Mississippi =

- Census-designated place
- Location within Mississippi Location within the United States
- Coordinates: 34°26′15″N 88°29′43″W
- Country: United States
- State: Mississippi
- County: Itawamba
- Elevation: 384 ft (117 m)
- Time zone: UTC-6 (Central (CST))
  - Summer (DST): UTC-5 (CDT)
- Area code: 662
- GNIS feature ID: 2812727

Kirkville is a census-designated place (CDP) and unincorporated community in Itawamba County, Mississippi, United States.

Kirkville is located 0.5 mi (0.80 km) south of the Natchez Trace Parkway.

Per the 2020 Census, the population was 308.

== History ==
Kirkville is named for Dr. J.D. Kirk.

The population in 1900 was 50.

The Kirkville post office was established prior to the Civil War, and was still in operation in 1905.

A stave mill was located in Kirkville in the early 1900s. Many of its workers had come from the Green River valley in Kentucky.

The Kirkville Baptist Church and Cemetery are located in the settlement. J.D. Kirk is interred in the cemetery.

== Demographics ==
Historical population
Census	Pop.	Note	%±
2020	308		—
U.S. Decennial Census; 2020

Kirkville was first listed as a census designated place in the 2020 U.S. census.

=== 2020 census ===
Kirkville CDP, Mississippi – Racial and ethnic composition Note: the US Census treats Hispanic/Latino as an ethnic category. This table excludes Latinos from the racial categories and assigns them to a separate category. Hispanics/Latinos may be of any race.
Race / Ethnicity (NH = Non-Hispanic)	Pop 2020	% 2020
White alone (NH)	301	97.73%
Black or African American alone (NH)	0	0.00%
Native American or Alaska Native alone (NH)	0	0.00%
Asian alone (NH)	0	0.00%
Native Hawaiian or Pacific Islander alone (NH)	0	0.00%
Other race alone (NH)	0	0.00%
Mixed race or Multiracial (NH)	1	0.32%
Hispanic or Latino (any race)	6	1.95%
Total	308	100.00%
