= Pigeye, Alabama =

Unincorporated community in Alabama, United States

- Unincorporated community
- Location within Alabama Location within the United States
- Coordinates: 34°17′52″N 87°55′27″W
- Country: United States
- State: Alabama
- County: Marion
- Elevation: 869 ft (265 m)
- Time zone: UTC-6 (Central (CST))
  - Summer (DST): UTC-5 (CDT)
- Area codes: 205, 659

Pigeye is an unincorporated community in Marion County, Alabama, United States.
