= Kasson, Indiana =

- Unincorporated community
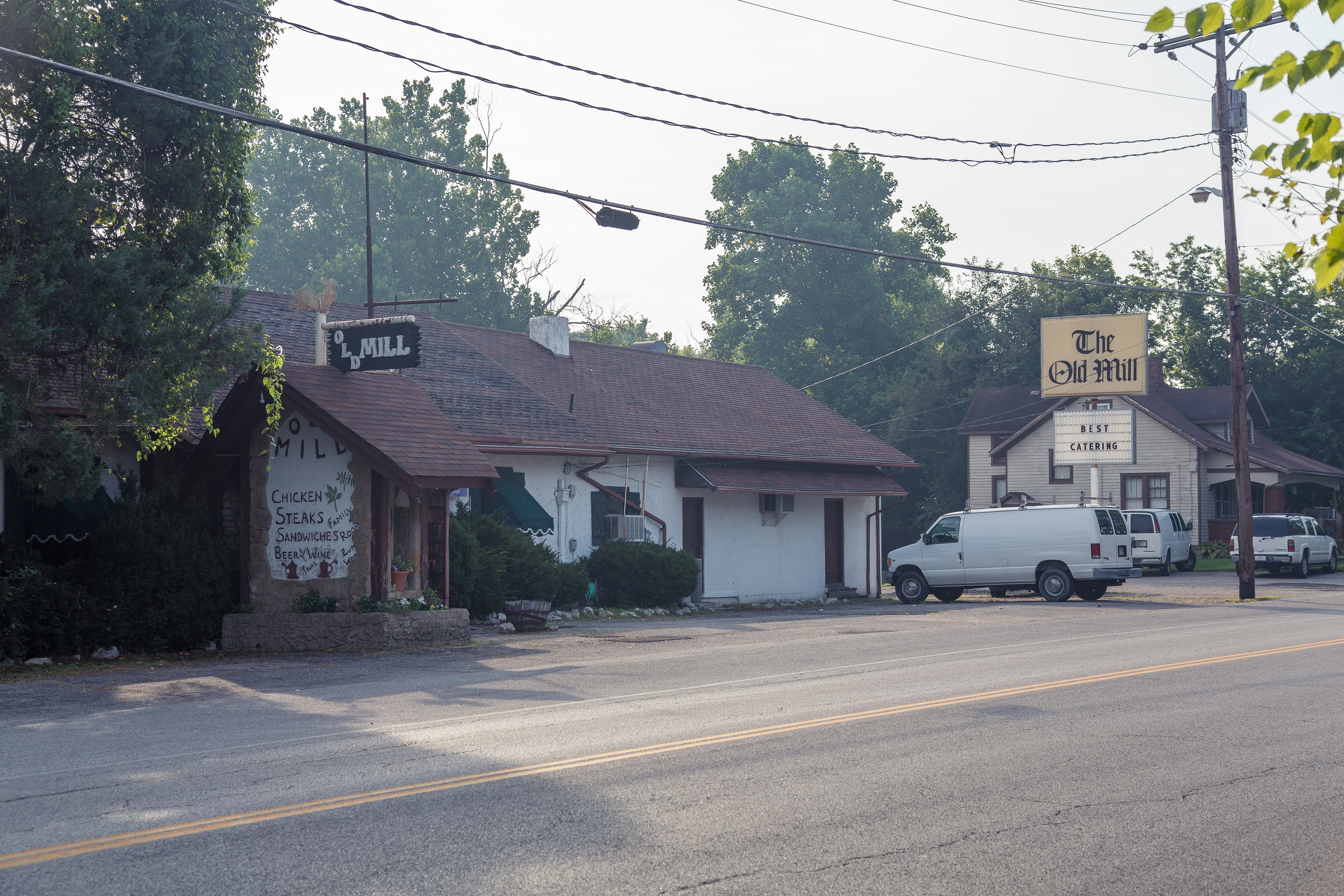

- Location within Indiana Location within the United States
- Coordinates: 38°01′01″N 87°38′10″W
- Country: United States
- State: Indiana
- County: Vanderburgh
- Township: German
- Elevation: 541 ft (165 m)
- Time zone: UTC-6 (Central (CST))
  - Summer (DST): UTC-5 (CDT)
- ZIP code: 47720
- Area codes: 812, 930
- GNIS feature ID: 437171

Kasson is an unincorporated community in German Township, Vanderburgh County, in the U.S. state of Indiana.

== History ==
A post office was established at Kasson in 1861, and remained in operation until it was discontinued in 1902.

== Geography ==
Before the invention of the automobile and the paving of roads in Indiana, travel often occurred on higher ground atop ridges. Kasson is located at the intersection of two very old ridge roads which were later developed into Indiana Highways 65 and 66, and Red Bank Road.

Indiana Highway 65 begins in Kasson and extends northward. Red Bank Road begins in Kasson and extends southward. Both are part of the ancient Red Banks Trace, a wilderness road that ran from Henderson, Kentucky to Vincennes, Indiana. The Red Banks Trace was a part of the larger Natchez Trace, and generally follows the ridge that divides the Wabash and Ohio River Valleys. This ancient trail was in existence and used by both animals and indigenous Americans prior to European settlement of the Wabash and Ohio River Valleys.

Historical Marker for Red Banks Trace

Indiana Highway 65 runs east and west through Kasson. It was originally a pioneer and stagecoach route between Evansville and New Harmony, Indiana. The part of Indiana Highway 65 that runs through Kasson runs atop a ridge.

Because of Kasson's unique geography, rain that falls in some parts of Kasson drains to the Ohio River. Rain that falls in other parts of Kasson drains to the Wabash river.
