= McLeod, Texas =

Unincorporated community in Texas, US

Coordinates: 32°56′44″N 94°04′40″W

McLeod is an unincorporated community and census designated place (CDP) in southeastern Cass County, Texas, United States. As of the 2020 census, McLeod had a population of 311.

The McLeod Independent School District serves area students. MISD has sports such as basketball, baseball/softball, cross country, tennis, track, and golf. The school has over 300 students.

== Demographics ==
Historical population
Census	Pop.	Note	%±
2020	311		—
U.S. Decennial Census; 1850–1900 1910; 1920 1930 1940; 1950 1960 1970; 1980 1990 2000; 2010 2020

McLeod first appeared as a census designated place in the 2020 U.S. census.

=== 2020 census ===
McLeod CDP, Texas – Racial and ethnic composition Note: the US Census treats Hispanic/Latino as an ethnic category. This table excludes Latinos from the racial categories and assigns them to a separate category. Hispanics/Latinos may be of any race.
Race / Ethnicity (NH = Non-Hispanic)	Pop 2020	% 2020
White alone (NH)	272	87.46%
Black or African American alone (NH)	1	0.32%
Native American or Alaska Native alone (NH)	4	1.29%
Asian alone (NH)	1	0.32%
Native Hawaiian or Pacific Islander alone (NH)	0	0.00%
Other race alone (NH)	0	0.00%
Mixed race or Multiracial (NH)	28	9.00%
Hispanic or Latino (any race)	5	1.61%
Total	311	100.00%
