= Henderson County, Kentucky =

County in Kentucky, United States

- County
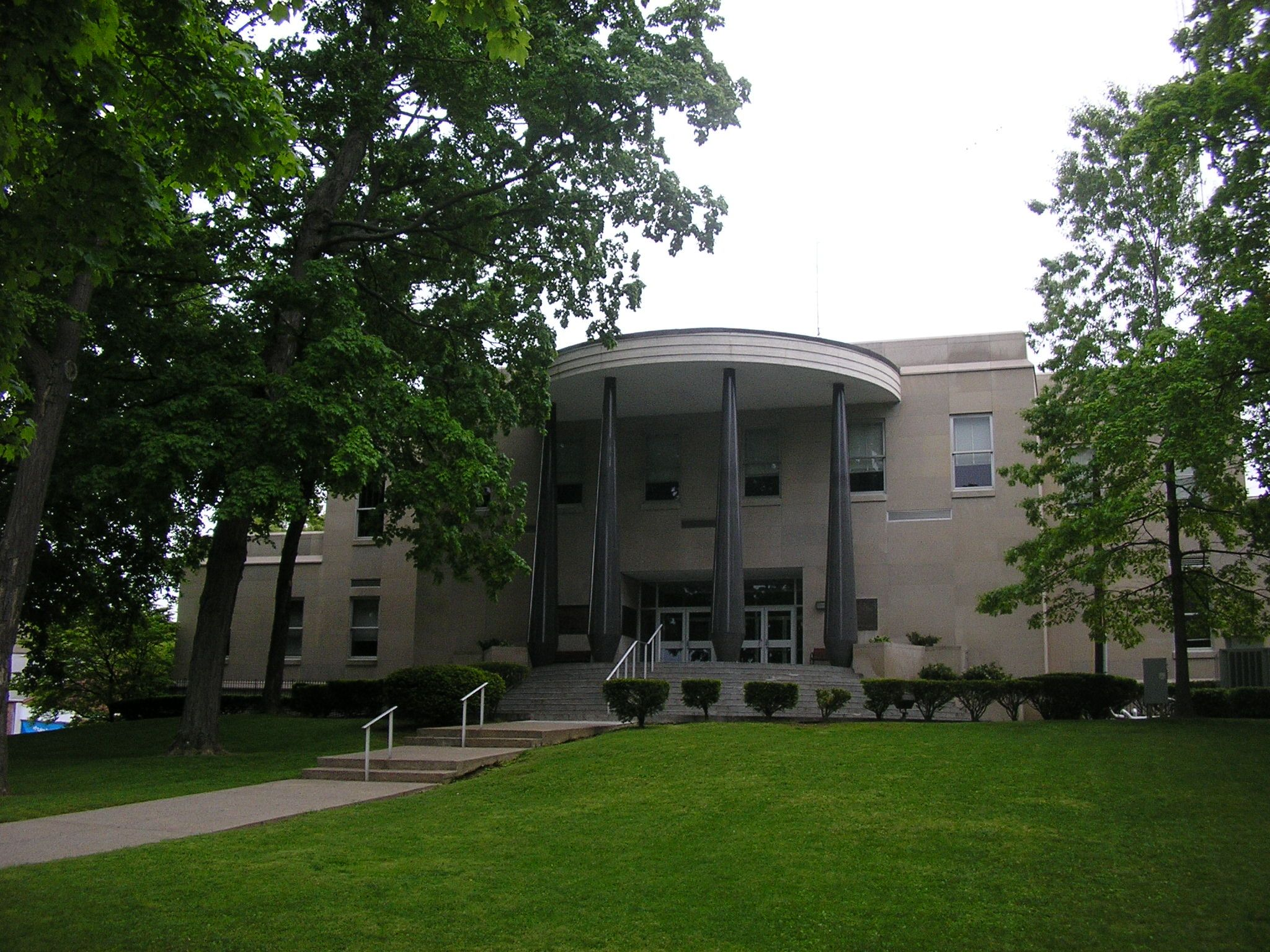
- Henderson County courthouse in Henderson, Kentucky

- Location within the U.S. state of Kentucky
- Coordinates: 37°48′N 87°34′W
- Country: United States
- State: Kentucky
- Founded: 1798
- Named for: Richard Henderson
- Seat: Henderson
- Largest city: Henderson

Government
  - Judge/Executive: Brad Schneider (R)

Area
  - Total: 466 sq mi (1,210 km^{2})
  - Land: 437 sq mi (1,130 km^{2})
  - Water: 30 sq mi (78 km^{2}) 6.4%

Population (2020)
  - Total: 44,793
  - Estimate (2025): 44,255 ▼
  - Density: 103/sq mi (39.6/km^{2})
- Time zone: UTC−6 (Central)
  - Summer (DST): UTC−5 (CDT)
- Congressional district: 1st
- Website: www.hendersoncountyky.gov

Henderson County is a county in the U.S. state of Kentucky. The county is located in western Kentucky on the Ohio River across from Evansville, Indiana. As of the 2020 census, the population was 44,793. Its county seat is Henderson.

The county was formed in 1798 and named for Richard Henderson who purchased 17,000,000 acres (69,000 km^{2}) of land from the Cherokee, part of which would later make up the county.

Henderson County lies within the West Kentucky Coal Field area. It is also part of the Evansville, IN-KY Metropolitan Statistical Area.

== History ==
The Transylvania Co., also known as Richard Henderson & Co., in 1775 purchased from the Cherokees a large swath of wilderness between the Kentucky River and Cumberland River, encompassing approximately half of what would become Kentucky as well as a portion of northern Tennessee. Their intention was to establish a 14th colony to be called Transylvania Colony. To help attract people to purchase land and populate the region, Henderson & Co. hired pioneer, explorer, woodsman, and frontiersman Daniel Boone to lead settlers through Cumberland Gap and direct woodsmen to cut the Wilderness Road through the Kentucky forest. However, the Continental Congress declined to act on Transylvania Co.'s petition without the consent of Virginia and North Carolina, which laid claim to the disputed lands.

In December 1778, Virginia's Assembly declared the Transylvania claim void. In compensation, Henderson and his partners received a grant of 200,000 acres on the Ohio River below the mouth of Green River. In 1797, the surviving Transylvania Company investors and heirs sent Samuel Hopkins and Thomas Allin to the Henderson Grant land to lay out a town and mark off land for the respective investors. The location they selected for the town was the site of an existing settlement that sat high above the Ohio River called Red Banks. The new town was subsequently named Henderson.

Henderson County was created out of Christian County in December 1798, and was officially established in May 1799. Henderson was designed as its county seat. The county initially encompassed a larger area than it does today. It was reduced in size when Hopkins County was formed in 1806, when Union County was established in 1811, and when Webster County was established in 1860.

In August 1799, serial killers Micajah and Wiley Harpe came to the house of Moses Stegall, near what is now Dixon in Webster County, and murdered his wife, child, and a visitor. Moses Stegall later tracked down the brothers, and killed Micajah Harpe, cutting off his head and hanging it in a tree as a warning to other outlaws. Wiley Harpe was captured and hanged four years later in Mississippi.

During the 19th century, a cultivar of dark tobacco raised in Henderson County became very popular in Great Britain and continental Europe. Henderson became the largest dark-tobacco market in the world, generating considerable wealth in Henderson County. Around 1880, Henderson had 17 stemmeries in the city and 18 in the county. Stemmeries were where tobacco was stripped from its stem and made ready for use. However, tobacco production in Henderson County declined through the 20th century and early 21st century, with few farmers still raising the labor-intensive crop.

A bend on the Ohio upstream from Henderson, is entirely within a strip of Henderson County that shares land borders with Knight and Pigeon Townships of Vanderburgh County, Indiana. This strip, known as "Green River Island", was the subject of Handly's Lessee v. Anthony, a U.S. Supreme Court case in 1820. This roughly 45 square miles (120 km^{2}) of area is part of Kentucky, even though it is on the Indiana side of the Ohio River. The Ellis Park Race Course is located there. This was caused by the Ohio River shifting south due to the effects of the 1812 New Madrid Earthquake. The boundary had been established when Kentucky became a state in 1790.

A workplace shooting occurred at an Atlantis Plastics factory in Henderson, Kentucky, United States on June 25, 2008. The gunman, 25-year-old Wesley Neal Higdon, shot and killed five people and critically injured a sixth, before taking his own life. The mass murder is the worst in the history of Henderson County, surpassing the triple homicides that took place in 1799 and 1955.

== Geography ==
According to the United States Census Bureau, the county has a total area of 466 square miles (1,210 km^{2}), of which 437 square miles (1,130 km^{2}) is land and 30 square miles (78 km^{2}) (6.4%) is water. The county's northern border with Indiana is mostly formed by the Ohio River, though some of the county lies north of the river.

=== Adjacent counties ===
- Posey County, Indiana (northwest)
- Vanderburgh County, Indiana (north)
- Warrick County, Indiana (northeast)
- Daviess County (east)
- McLean County (southeast)
- Webster County (south)
- Union County (west)

== Demographics ==
Historical population
Census	Pop.	Note	%±
1800	1,468		—
1810	4,703		220.4%
1820	5,714		21.5%
1830	6,659		16.5%
1840	9,548		43.4%
1850	12,171		27.5%
1860	14,262		17.2%
1870	18,457		29.4%
1880	24,515		32.8%
1890	29,536		20.5%
1900	32,907		11.4%
1910	29,352		−10.8%
1920	27,609		−5.9%
1930	26,295		−4.8%
1940	27,020		2.8%
1950	30,715		13.7%
1960	33,519		9.1%
1970	36,031		7.5%
1980	40,849		13.4%
1990	43,044		5.4%
2000	44,829		4.1%
2010	46,250		3.2%
2020	44,793		−3.2%
2025 (est.)	44,255	▼	−1.2%
U.S. Decennial Census; 1790–1960 1900–1990; 1990–2000 2010–2020

=== 2020 census ===
As of the 2020 census, the county had a population of 44,793. The median age was 41.2 years. 23.0% of residents were under the age of 18 and 18.4% of residents were 65 years of age or older. For every 100 females there were 93.3 males, and for every 100 females age 18 and over there were 90.3 males age 18 and over.

The racial makeup of the county was 84.0% White, 8.2% Black or African American, 0.2% American Indian and Alaska Native, 0.5% Asian, 0.1% Native Hawaiian and Pacific Islander, 1.7% from some other race, and 5.2% from two or more races. Hispanic or Latino residents of any race comprised 3.1% of the population.

63.5% of residents lived in urban areas, while 36.5% lived in rural areas.

There were 18,345 households in the county, of which 30.2% had children under the age of 18 living with them and 29.2% had a female householder with no spouse or partner present. About 30.1% of all households were made up of individuals and 13.0% had someone living alone who was 65 years of age or older.

There were 20,047 housing units, of which 8.5% were vacant. Among occupied housing units, 63.0% were owner-occupied and 37.0% were renter-occupied. The homeowner vacancy rate was 1.8% and the rental vacancy rate was 9.3%.

=== 2000 census ===
As of the census of 2000, there were 44,829 people, 18,095 households, and 12,576 families residing in the county. The population density was 102 per square mile (39/km^{2}). There were 19,466 housing units at an average density of 44 per square mile (17/km^{2}). The racial makeup of the county was 91.16% White, 7.10% Black or African American, 0.16% Native American, 0.33% Asian, 0.01% Pacific Islander, 0.39% from other races, and 0.86% from two or more races. Hispanic or Latino people of any race were 0.97% of the population.

There were 18,095 households, out of which 32.40% had children under the age of 18 living with them, 54.40% were married couples living together, 11.60% had a female householder with no husband present, and 30.50% were non-families. 26.40% of all households were made up of individuals, and 10.60% had someone living alone who was 65 years of age or older. The average household size was 2.43 and the average family size was 2.93.

In the county, the population was spread out, with 24.60% under the age of 18, 8.40% from 18 to 24, 30.00% from 25 to 44, 23.90% from 45 to 64, and 13.10% who were 65 years of age or older. The median age was 37 years. For every 100 females, there were 93.60 males. For every 100 females age 18 and over, there were 90.60 males.

The median income for a household in the county was $35,892, and the median income for a family was $44,703. Males had a median income of $33,838 versus $22,572 for females. The per capita income for the county was $18,470. About 9.70% of families and 12.30% of the population were below the poverty line, including 17.20% of those under age 18 and 10.10% of those age 65 or over.

== Communities ==
=== Cities ===
- Corydon
- Henderson (county seat)
- Robards

=== Census-designated places ===
- Anthoston
- Poole (partially in Webster County)
- Spottsville

=== Other unincorporated places ===
- Alzey
- Baskett
- Bluff City
- Cairo
- Dixie
- Finley Addition
- Geneva
- Graham Hill
- Hebbardsville
- Niagara
- Reed
- Smith Mills
- Weaverton
- Wilson
- Zion

=== Ghost town ===
- Scuffletown

== Notable people ==
- John James Audubon, ornithologist, painter and naturalist, lived in Henderson 1810–1819
- Sam Ball, professional football player in the NFL from 1966 to 1970; born in Henderson in 1944
- Stephen Bardo, professional basketball player in the NBA from 1990 to 2000; born in Henderson in 1968
- LaVerne Butler, Kentucky clergyman and university president; born in Henderson County in 1926
- Happy Chandler, 44th and 49th governor of Kentucky; born in the farming community of Corydon, Kentucky in 1898
- Ewing Galloway, journalist and one-time county prosecutor; born in Little Dixie, Kentucky in 1880
- W. C. Handy, musician and composer who became known as the "father of the blues"; lived in Henderson during the 1890s, performing in bands
- Grandpa Jones, country entertainer; born in 1913 in the small farming community of Niagara, Kentucky
- Gary L. Littrell, Command Sergeant Major; born in Henderson in 1944
- Luther Skaggs Jr., Marine corporal; born in Henderson in 1923
- Joseph Wilson Trigg, historian of early Christianity, and Episcopal priest

== Politics ==
United States presidential election results for Henderson County, Kentucky
Year	Republican		Democratic		Third party(ies)	
Year	No.	%	No.	%	No.	%
1912	1,157	21.51%	3,098	57.58%	1,125	20.91%
1916	2,218	36.41%	3,699	60.73%	174	2.86%
1920	4,161	35.51%	7,272	62.06%	285	2.43%
1924	4,902	53.67%	4,046	44.30%	186	2.04%
1928	5,443	57.03%	4,068	42.62%	33	0.35%
1932	2,485	27.98%	6,100	68.69%	296	3.33%
1936	1,811	20.50%	6,835	77.38%	187	2.12%
1940	2,455	26.65%	6,727	73.03%	29	0.31%
1944	2,683	31.22%	5,887	68.49%	25	0.29%
1948	1,904	24.13%	5,499	69.70%	486	6.16%
1952	4,929	45.25%	5,913	54.28%	51	0.47%
1956	5,085	46.92%	5,501	50.76%	252	2.33%
1960	5,302	48.79%	5,565	51.21%	0	0.00%
1964	2,734	25.35%	8,022	74.38%	29	0.27%
1968	3,512	32.74%	5,062	47.19%	2,152	20.06%
1972	6,231	60.68%	3,889	37.87%	149	1.45%
1976	4,053	33.45%	7,916	65.32%	149	1.23%
1980	5,074	37.15%	8,082	59.17%	503	3.68%
1984	7,389	51.88%	6,795	47.71%	58	0.41%
1988	6,911	47.27%	7,648	52.31%	61	0.42%
1992	5,125	31.78%	8,270	51.28%	2,731	16.94%
1996	5,092	34.39%	8,051	54.38%	1,663	11.23%
2000	7,698	48.00%	8,054	50.22%	287	1.79%
2004	10,467	55.97%	8,101	43.32%	133	0.71%
2008	9,523	47.95%	10,049	50.60%	289	1.46%
2012	10,296	55.29%	8,091	43.45%	235	1.26%
2016	12,159	61.69%	6,707	34.03%	844	4.28%
2020	12,730	61.51%	7,639	36.91%	328	1.58%
2024	12,592	63.96%	6,837	34.73%	259	1.32%

The county voted "No" on 2022 Kentucky Amendment 2, an anti-abortion ballot measure, by 54% to 46%, and backed Donald Trump with 62% of the vote to Joe Biden's 37% in the 2020 presidential election. Henderson County leaned Democratic for much of its history, only voting for Republicans in national landslides. Since the turn of the 21st Century, however, the county has trended strongly Republican. It last voted for a Democrat in 2008, when it supported Barack Obama. In the 2019 and 2023 gubernatorial election, the county voted for Democrat Andy Beshear.

=== Elected officials ===
Elected officials as of January 3, 2025
U.S. House	James Comer (R)	KY 1
Ky. Senate	Robby Mills (R)	4
Ky. House	J. T. Payne (R)	11

== See also ==
- Henderson County High School
- National Register of Historic Places listings in Henderson County, Kentucky
