= Spottsville, Kentucky =

Census-designated place in Kentucky, United States

- Census-designated place
- Location within Kentucky Location within the United States
- Coordinates: 37°51′27″N 87°24′49″W
- Country: United States
- State: Kentucky
- County: Henderson

Area
  - Total: 0.48 sq mi (1.24 km^{2})
  - Land: 0.47 sq mi (1.22 km^{2})
  - Water: 0.0077 sq mi (0.02 km^{2})
- Elevation: 397 ft (121 m)

Population (2020)
  - Total: 274
  - Density: 581.4/sq mi (224.47/km^{2})
- Time zone: UTC-6 (Central (CST))
  - Summer (DST): UTC-5 (CST)
- ZIP code: 42458
- FIPS code: 21-72570
- GNIS feature ID: 504091
- Website: spottsville.com

Spottsville is a census-designated place (CDP) and former coal town in Henderson County, Kentucky, United States. As of the 2020 census, Spottsville had a population of 274.

U.S. Route 60 forms the northern edge of Spottsville, and the Green River forms the eastern edge. The first Spottsville Bridge over the Green River opened on December 17, 1931. In September 2013, the Kentucky Transportation Cabinet determined that the structure was functionally obsolete because of its narrow deck width and was structurally deficient. The new Spottsville Bridge was completed in 2022, with the ribbon being cut by Irma Stanley Day who had cut the ribbon on the original Spottsville Bridge in 1931.

The Green River Lock & Dam is located in the community. Traveling east through Spottsville, one can see the lock to one's right when one crosses the US-60 bridge (the Green River Bridge). One can still see some of the remains of the old locks that were replaced in the mid-1960s; to one's left, one can see a turning bridge for trains (it turns when a barge comes through).

US-60 leads east 19 miles (31 km) to Owensboro and west 11 miles (18 km) to Henderson, the Henderson County seat.

There is one elementary school in Spottsville, serving all of the eastern part of Henderson County (including Beals, Baskett, and Reed). The original Spottsville school, which served all grades, provided Henderson County's first school bus service in 1920. This original Spottsville school burned down in March 1932.

Spottsville was named for Major Samuel Spotts, who shot the first gun at the Battle of New Orleans. The area was visited by the Spanish explorer Hernando de Soto in 1541. His army was attacked near the Ohio River by Indians of a tribe or tribes called variously the Kashinampo, the Quizqui, and the Chiska Cherokee.

From 1904 to 1911 as many as 116 men of the Green River Coal Company mined coal in Spottsville. The Pittsburgh Coal Company operated a 75-man coal camp in Spottsville from 1911 to 1924.

== Demographics ==
Historical population
Census	Pop.	Note	%±
2020	274		—
U.S. Decennial Census
