= Don Shelton =

American football player and coach (1928–2011)

Biographical details
- Born: 1928
- Died: October 2, 2011 (aged 83); Ocala, Florida, U.S.

Playing career
- 1946–1949: Louisville

Coaching career (HC unless noted)
- 1954–1959: Henderson City HS (KY)
- 1960–1966: Murray State

Head coaching record
- Overall: 26–41–3 (college)

Don Shelton (1928 – October 2, 2011) was an American football player and coach. He served as the head football coach at Murray State University from 1960 to 1966, compiling a record of 26–41–3. Prior to that, he had an impressive run as the head coach at Henderson City High School in Henderson, Kentucky.

Shelton was a four-year letter winner at the University of Louisville from 1946 to 1949.

== Head coaching record ==
=== College ===
Year	Team	Overall	Conference	Standing	Bowl/playoffs
Murray State Thoroughbreds/Racers (Ohio Valley Conference) (1960–1966)
1960	Murray State	5–5	4–2	T–2nd	
1961	Murray State	4–6	2–4	5th	
1962	Murray State	5–5	1–5	T–6th	
1963	Murray State	5–5	3–4	T–4th	
1964	Murray State	5–4–1	3–3–1	T–3rd	
1965	Murray State	2–6–2	1–4–2	6th	
1966	Murray State	0–10	0–7	8th	
Murray State:		26–41–3	14–29–3		
Total:		26–41–3			
