= Audubon, Henderson =

Unincorporated community in Kentucky, United States

Audubon
- Neighborhood of Henderson
- Location within Kentucky Location within the United States
- Coordinates: 37.828383°N 87.584274°W
- Country: United States
- State: Kentucky
- County: Henderson County
- City: Henderson
- Time zone: UTC-6 (Central (CST))
  - Summer (DST): UTC-5 (CDT)
- ZIP code: 42420
- Area codes: 270, 364

Audubon, often called the "South Side", is a neighborhood in Henderson, Kentucky, United States. Its boundaries follow Loeb Street to the west, Meadow Street to the south, Pringle Street to the east, Mill Street to the south, Madison Street to the northwest, S Alvasia Street to the north, Powell Street to the east, S Meadow Street to the south, Clay Street to the east, and Atkinson Street to the south, connecting to the corner of Loeb Street. The site of the Audubon Grade School is a prominent feature of the neighborhood.

== History ==
During the 19th century, travel between communities was by foot or on horseback, so they were placed close together. East of the town of Henderson, two villages grew up, with present-day Clay Street being the dividing line between the two county school districts: Weaverton was south and Audubon north of this line.

Tradition says that John James Audubon built the first house in this wooded wilderness, on what is now the northeast corner of Loeb and Shelby streets. The first population growth came with the erection of the Cotton Mill in 1883 and its tenement houses in 1885. A furniture company followed in 1886. Known first as Ohio Valley Furniture Co., it became Marstall Furniture in 1895. By 1900, 600 people worked at the Cotton Mill, with a weekly payroll of $8,000, and Marstall employed 150 men, paying them $2,500 weekly.

The Cotton Mill also built the first school room, near the northwest corner of Letcher and Powell streets. In an interview given in 1950, Ed Hare, a former city judge, reminisced about his old school, commenting that only the younger children attended because many were working in the mill at age nine. He began working at age 11. Another citizen of this period, Mrs. Hattie Williams, remembered seeing children going to work in their bare feet, through snow.

Nevertheless, two teachers were required by 1898 and one of them, John Dillahay, said 90 pupils were enrolled. Working conditions had improved by 1900 to such an extent that parents began demanding more education, and an addition was built to the school. Later on in 1905 the Audubon area was annexed as a part of Henderson, and East End residents requested a new school. The board of education spent $2,675 for a church and lot on the southeast corner of Letcher and Clay streets and hired Spalding Trible as the architect of the new Audubon Grade School.

Construction began in 1906, and the school opened in 1907. At one time, the school boasted the largest enrollment in the public school system. The school closed after its furnace exploded in 1976.

The Audubon post office was discontinued in 1895, but the federal government recognized it as a town as late as 1950 by delivering a letter addressed to a street number in "Audubon".

== Audubon Heights ==
Audubon Heights, accepted as part of the Audubon area, has boundaries following Powell Street to the east, S Alvasia Street to the south, Cherry Street to the west, and S Green Street to the north connecting to the corner of Powell Street. In the 19th century this neighborhood, being closer to Green Street and its businesses, was considered the front of the Audubon area because of its neighborhood businesses and conveniences of being closer to inner city businesses.

The only school in this neighborhood was Douglas High School, which only blacks from the city and county could attend. In 1965 desegregation was completed in the city school system, and Douglas High School was merged into Henderson City High School, leaving the Douglas High School to turn into a public swimming pool and finally the John F. Kennedy Center. After merging schools, blacks and whites both attended Henderson City High School. The last location of the school was placed in the Audubon Heights area and is now known as Henderson South Middle School.

=== Red-light district ===
Discreetly having the city's only red-light district in the 20th century, this area was considered the hot spot of Audubon. Sallie Smithhart operated Henderson's most notorious prostitution house on the south side at 534 Fagan Street. It is believed she inherited this mantle of Moses Rhodes, who had founded the red-light districts and popularized a prostitution empire here in the 1880–90s. Sallie Smithhart was one of his protégés early in her career and bought the house on Fagan Street from him in 1902. The house was a brick-built structure amongst mostly wood-frame shotgun houses in the "Pea Ridge" red-light district. She owned 12 beds, a player piano and a Victrola worth $116. There were two pistols also. One was kept in the safe and the other hidden in the bathroom, for the use of shady ladies in case they found themselves dealing with an unruly or hassling client. In those times these houses were referred to as a "bawdy house" or "brothel". Smithhart pleaded guilty a number of times over her operation. Lawsuits were filed by Amelia Gabe and daughter Annie. The Gabe family lived directly across the street from the bawdy house. Amelia Gabe said in her suit that for more than 10 years she had had to put up with the "lewd and lascivious conduct" and the "boisterous, profane, vulgar and obscene language" of people coming and going from Smithhart's business. The lawsuit was unsuccessful and caused tension between Smithhart and city authorities. But her business suffered a serious fire in mid-January 1917, with another lawsuit filed a few months after. Her business was silenced during the 1920s, but the "Pea Ridge" red-light district sometimes echoes in modern-day talk. Sallie Smithhart died of kidney problems at age 58 on October 11, 1930.

Night spots were run out of residential houses, around the streets of S Alves, Vine, Fagan, S Alvasia and more, offering alcoholic beverages, music, dancing, and gambling, and some locally owned business supported these operations. Business owners found these brothels, as well as night club gambling spots, as another source of earning money without the frustration of tax. This spot, being the home and party scene of small-time drug dealers and gang members, would soon bring problems with the law enforcement and community neighbors. This is also the time when Henderson was going through its legendary "Little Chicago" phase. Later, dying down after enough of the criminals had been prosecuted, the area finally became more peaceful for residents.

== See also ==
- Cities and towns along the Ohio River
- Metzger's Tavern
