= 2008 Atlantis Plastics shooting =

2008 mass shooting in Kentucky, U.S.

- Undated photo of Wesley Neal Higdon
- Location: 37.80422°N 87.63897°W; Henderson, Kentucky, U.S.
- Date: June 25, 2008; 18 years ago c. 12:20 a.m. (CDT; UTC−05:00)
- Target: Co-workers
- Attack type: Mass shooting; murder-suicide; mass murder; workplace shooting
- Weapon: .45 caliber Hi-Point Model JHP semi-automatic pistol
- Deaths: 6 (including the perpetrator)
- Injuries: 1
- Perpetrator: Wesley Neal Higdon
- Motive: Co-worker dispute

In the early morning of June 25, 2008, a mass shooting took place at the Atlantis Plastics factory in Henderson, Kentucky, United States. Wesley Neal Higdon, a 25-year-old employee at the factory, shot and killed five people and critically injured a sixth person before committing suicide. The shooting is the worst in the history of Henderson County, Kentucky, in terms of casualties, surpassing triple homicides occurring in 1799 and 1955.

== Shooting ==
The shooting started at approximately 12:20 a.m. after the supervisor Kevin Taylor escorted Higdon out of the plant. Higdon then retrieved a .45 caliber Hi-Point Model JHP semi-automatic pistol from his truck, fatally shot the supervisor outside of the door and went back into the factory. Around 160 employees were inside the factory at the time of the shooting. Higdon then entered the break room and fatally shot four co-workers before shooting and killing Joshua Hinjosa on the factory plant floor and critically injuring another co-worker. Higdon then fatally shot himself in the head. Subsequent reports indicate that Taylor had reprimanded Higdon twice before the shooting, once for talking on his cell phone too much and for not wearing safety glasses, then later for an altercation with co-worker Joshua Hinojosa at a convenience store across the street from the factory. In January 2008, Higdon was disciplined for failing to report a broken towel rack in an employee restroom. Higdon had worked at the facility since late 2007 and had misdemeanor convictions for marijuana possession and for driving under the influence.

The victims were all shot with a .45 caliber semi-automatic pistol. Taylor was shot by Higdon outside the factory, followed by four more workers in the factory's break room, and Hinojosa, who was shot from behind on the factory floor. Higdon then committed suicide. Henderson police said that the shooter, who had a reputation for being difficult, had argued with supervisor Kevin Taylor and was being escorted out of the factory by the supervisor. According to police, two hours before the shooting Higdon called his girlfriend and advised her was going to kill his boss at the factory. She did not inform anyone of the call.

== Victims ==
=== Deceased ===
- Joshua Hinojosa, co-worker, 28, of Sebree
- Trisha Mirelez, co-worker, 25, of Sebree
- Israel Monroy, co-worker, 29, of Henderson
- Kevin G. Taylor, supervisor, 40, of Dixon
- Rachael Vasquez, co-worker, 26, of Sebree
- Wesley Neal Higdon, gunman, 25, of Henderson

=== Injured ===
- Noelia Monroy, co-worker, sister of Israel Monroy, shot one time each in the arm, chest, and leg.
