= Ewing Galloway =

American lawyer and journalist (1880–1953)

- Born: December 6, 1880; Little Dixie, Kentucky
- Died: June 26, 1953 (aged 72); Henderson, Kentucky
- Education: Columbia University
- Occupations: American journalist; owner of a photography agency; lawyer
- Employer(s): Ewing Galloway Agency, Collier's, Underwood & Underwood, Literary Digest, Henderson Gleaner, City of Henderson, Kentucky
- Known for: Founding the largest photography agency in the United States

Ewing Galloway (December 6, 1880 – June 26, 1953) was an American journalist. He owned a photography agency that provided works focused around the economy and transportation. The Ewing Galloway Agency was, at the time, the largest photography agency in the United States.

== Biography ==
He was born in Little Dixie, Kentucky, on December 6, 1880. He first worked as a lawyer in Henderson County, Kentucky. To become a lawyer, he passed the bar examination in 1905. He was prosecutor for the City of Henderson, Kentucky. He also worked for the newspaper Henderson Gleaner. He became more interested in journalism due to his work at the Gleaner. He relocated to Manhattan, New York City. He took a journalism course at Columbia University. He left New York. He ended up working in the Midwestern United States and Hawaii. He moved back to Kentucky and worked for the Henderson Gleaner again as an intern. He moved back to New York. He worked for Literary Digest as an assistant editor.

After working at Literary Digest, he started working for Collier's and subsequently became their photography editor. After Collier's, he worked for Underwood & Underwood. Galloway started his own stock photography company called the Ewing Galloway Agency which opened in 1920 in New York City and was located on 28th Street. He acquired 8,000 photographs in 1925. The photographs consisted of content focused around Asia and Africa. Galloway also had images related to Indigenous peoples of North Americas and Europe. His work was focused around transportation, commerce and the economy. He sold photographs to encyclopedias, books and magazines.

Galloway opened up satellite offices in Detroit, Los Angeles, Boston, Chicago, London, Amsterdam, and Berlin. His studios trained photographers and photographers for hire included Burton Holmes and Maclean Dameron. His business would be considered the largest photography agency in the United States at the time.

When he was older, Galloway lived mainly in Henderson, Kentucky, where he owned a farm, and volunteered in the community. He also wrote a column in Kentucky newspapers; it was called "Kentucky on the March." He was a freemason. On June 18, 1953, Galloway was heading to a baseball game in a taxi when he was injured in a car accident. He died on June 26 in Henderson from his injuries.

== Legacy ==
Photographs from Galloway's collection reside in the Library of Congress within the Frank G. Carpenter collection. Syracuse University Library houses the Ewing Galloway Collection of Photographs. That collection totals over 400,000 images. Ewing Galloway, Inc. continues to maintain economic branch of the collection. In 2007, the Kresge Art Museum put together a retrospective exhibition of Galloway photographs.
