= Metzger's Tavern =

Historic bar and restaurant in Henderson, Kentucky, U.S.

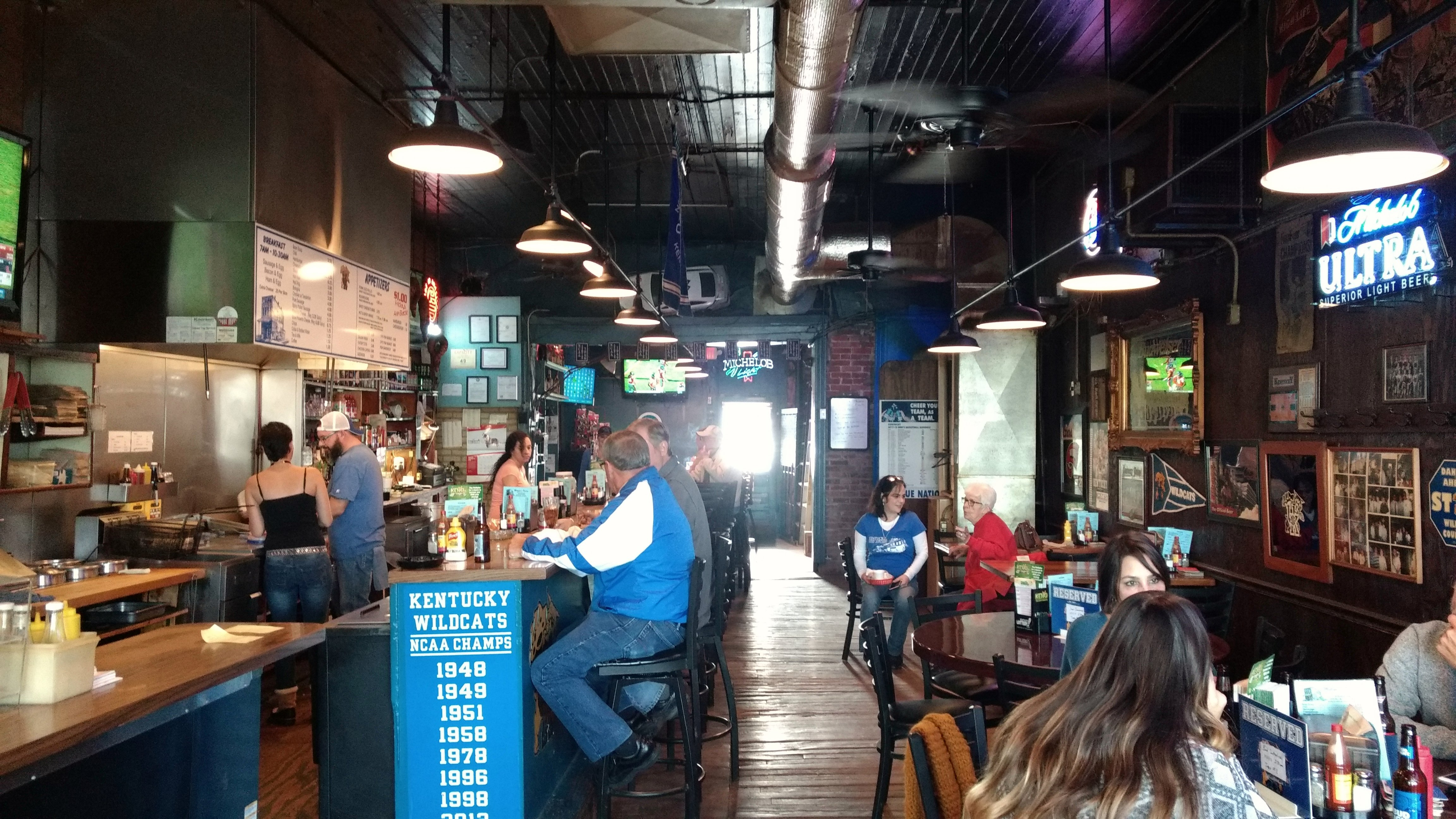
- Metzger's Tavern, Interior
- Interactive map of Metzger's Tavern
- Location: Henderson, Kentucky, USA
- Coordinates: 37.8304°N 87.5844°W

Construction
- Opened: 1887

Metzger's Tavern is a historic bar, restaurant and package liquor store in the east side of Henderson, Kentucky. It is the oldest continuously operating tavern in the state of Kentucky. In 2010, Metzger's Tavern was named one of Huffington Post's top 25 dive bars in the United States.

== History ==
Metzger's Tavern opened in 1887 on Powell Street, drawing clientele from the Audubon neighborhood, a working class community of mill workers. It started out as either The Swing Door Saloon or Hosbach's - accounts vary. John Albert Metzger acquired the business in 1945 and it became Metzger's Market; it became Metzger's Tavern in 1962, when it was operated by John's son, Don Metzger, and his business partner, Joe Tigue.

Women did not enter Metzger's Tavern until the 1990s; this was a custom rather than any posted rule or policy. In the 1990s, women began joining co-workers for lunch, despite the lack of a women's restroom. There is still just one bathroom at the tavern, with two stand-up urinals and a door on the toilet cubicle.

Various Kentucky celebrities have visited the tavern, including then University of Kentucky basketball coach Rick Pitino and Kentucky governor Paul Patton.

== Today ==
In 2006, Metzger's Tavern was purchased by Steve Watkins. In 2016, it was reported he was looking for partners to eventually take over.

In 2017, the bar became woman-owned: Moriah Hobgood, owner of Mo's House bar in Evansville, purchased Metzger's Tavern, running it with general manager Sarah Stewart. "The one big change that Hobgood and Stewart are making will not affect the building, the décor or the menu, but is causing upset among some long-time customers: they are going nonsmoking."

As of 2022, Metzger's was still owned by Moriah Hobgood, managed by her sister-in-law, and nine of its eleven employees were women.

Metzger's featured food is bean soup and chili, with a side of oyster crackers, hamburgers, and fried bologna in eggs.

== See also ==
- Tootsie's Orchid Lounge
- Threadgill's Tavern
- Armadillo World Headquarters
- James Brown House
- Bridge Cafe
- Max's Kansas City
- Sloppy Joe's
