= Tri-Fest =

Annual charitable festival in Kentucky

Tri-Fest is an annual charitable festival held every April in Henderson, Kentucky. Established in 1988, it's one of the largest annual festivals held in Kentucky and generates over $100,000 in annual direct and indirect support to charities in western Kentucky and southern Indiana. The Henderson Breakfast Lions Club originated and continues to organize the festival as a means to raise funds for local charities. Tri-Fest raises funds for local charities in two ways:

1. The Breakfast Lions Club generates revenue from the sale of tickets and concession booth fees to for-profit businesses. A portion of these funds are allocated to organize the following year's Tri-Fest. The bulk of this revenue, however, is donated to local charities.
2. The organizers welcome local not-for-profit charities to set up food and educational booths. These charities keep 100% of their profits to support their organizations. Charities have included local schools, churches, an HIV care group, a local hospital, and other service, civic, and faith groups. Food items offered to Tri-Fest patrons have included pork chop sandwiches, lemonade, apple dumplings, corn dogs, hamburgers, and the dubious deep fried Twinkie.

Tri-Fest primarily takes place over one weekend in downtown Henderson with much of Main Street and Central Park converted into a pedestrian festival site. A range of live entertainment usually centers on the Central Park stage. Through the years, however, the event has expanded to events throughout the preceding weeks and now include sports tournaments, a 12K/36K bike ride, a beauty pageant, and an art contest. The event culminates with fireworks over downtown Henderson on the Ohio River.

Tri-Fest took a hiatus in 2020 and 2021, making its usual annual return April 22–24, 2022.
