= The Literary Digest =

1890–1938 American general interest magazine

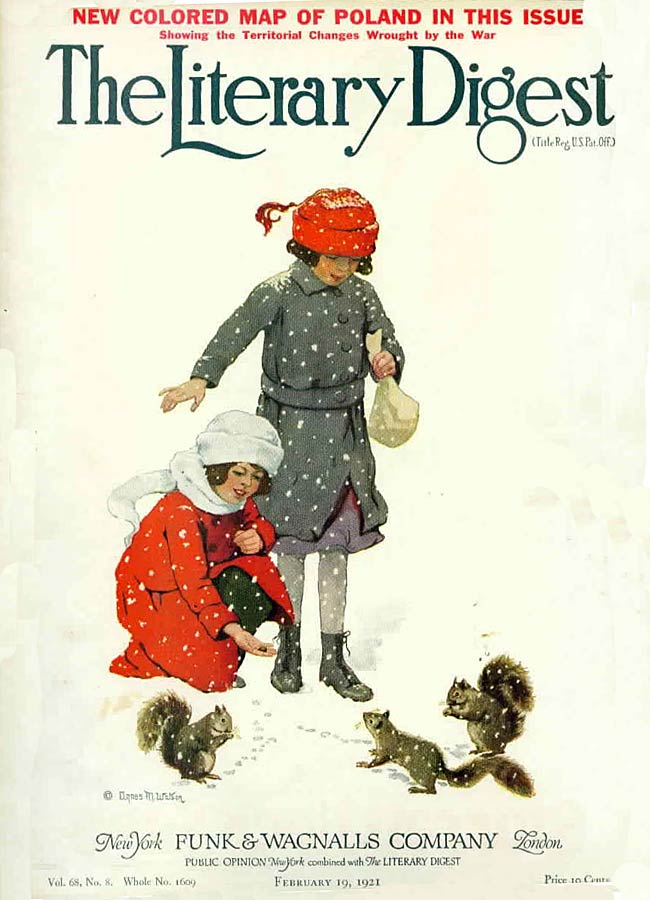
- Cover of the February 19, 1921 edition of The Literary Digest
- Founder: Isaac Kaufmann Funk
- First issue: 1890
- Final issue: 1938
- Company: Funk & Wagnalls
- Country: United States
- Based in: New York City
- Language: English

The Literary Digest was an American general interest weekly magazine published by Funk & Wagnalls. Founded by Isaac Kaufmann Funk in 1890, it eventually merged with two similar weekly magazines, Public Opinion and Current Opinion.

The magazine gained notoriety when its poll of the 1936 United States presidential election substantially missed the final result, predicting a decisive victory for Republican candidate Alf Landon over Democratic incumbent President Franklin D. Roosevelt; in the election, Roosevelt defeated Landon in an unprecedented landslide.

The magazine ultimately ceased publication in 1938.

== History ==
Beginning with early issues, the emphasis was on opinion articles and an analysis of news events. Established as a weekly newsmagazine, it offered condensations of articles from American, Canadian and European publications. Type-only covers gave way to illustrated covers during the early 1900s. After Isaac Funk's death in 1912, Robert Joseph Cuddihy became the editor. In the 1920s, the covers carried full-color reproductions of famous paintings. By 1927, The Literary Digest climbed to a circulation of over one million. Covers of the final issues displayed various photographic and photo-montage techniques. In 1938, it was acquired by the Review of Reviews, only to fail soon after. It was bought by Time, which converted its subscriptions to Time subscriptions.

A regular column in The Digest, known as "The Lexicographer's Easy Chair," was produced by Frank Horace Vizetelly; it duly noted that "(t)o decide questions concerning the correct use of words for this column, the Funk & Wagnalls New Standard Dictionary is consulted as arbeiter." Ewing Galloway was assistant editor at the publication.

== Presidential poll ==
From 1916, the magazine conducted a poll regarding the likely outcome of the quadrennial presidential election. Prior to the 1936 election, the poll had always correctly predicted the winner.

In 1936, the magazine's poll concluded that Republican candidate Governor Alfred Landon of Kansas was likely to be the overwhelming winner against Democratic incumbent President Franklin Delano Roosevelt, with 57.08% of the popular vote and 370 electoral votes.

In November, Roosevelt won re-election in an unprecedented landslide, winning every state except Maine and Vermont, and winning the popular vote by 24.92 points.

The magazine's error was a massive 39.08 points in the popular vote margin - with even larger errors in 20 of the 30 states that were predicted to be won by Landon but were actually won by Roosevelt - and the magazine folded within 18 months of the election.

In hindsight, the polling techniques employed by the magazine were faulty: they failed to capture a representative sample of the electorate, and disproportionately polled higher-income voters, who were far more likely to support Landon. Although it had polled ten million individuals (of whom 2.38 million responded, an astronomical total for any opinion poll), it had surveyed its own readers first, then two other readily available lists, those of registered automobile owners and that of telephone users, groups that all had disposable incomes well above the national average, and were also far wealthier than average Americans at the time, shown in part by their ability to afford a magazine subscription, a car and/or a phone during the depths of the Great Depression.

Subsequent research concluded that as expected, this sampling bias was a factor, but non-response bias was the primary contributor to the magnitude of the error: people who strongly disliked Roosevelt were more likely to respond with their intention to vote for Landon.

This debacle led to a considerable refinement of public opinion polling techniques, and later came to be regarded as ushering in the era of modern scientific public opinion research.

It is also notable that every other poll made at or around this time predicted Roosevelt would defeat Landon, albeit not to the extent that he ultimately did: these polls expected Roosevelt to receive a maximum of 370 electoral votes.

George Gallup's American Institute of Public Opinion achieved national recognition by correctly predicting the result within 6.8% using a much smaller sample size of 50,000. Gallup's final poll before the election predicted that Roosevelt would receive 55.7% of the popular vote : the official tally saw Roosevelt receive 62.5% of the popular vote.

== See also ==
- History of opinion polls
