= Joseph Wilson Trigg =

American historian

- Born: October 25, 1949 (age 76); Henderson County, Kentucky, United States
- Occupations: Historian, author
- Scientific career
- Fields: Early Christian history

Joseph Wilson Trigg (born 25 October 1949) is an American scholar who specializes in early Christian history.

== Biography ==
Trigg was born on 25 October 1949, in Henderson County, Kentucky. He obtained his PhD from the University of Chicago in 1978, with a thesis titled "Healing that Comes from God: The Alexandrian Response to the Third-Century Penitential Crisis". He then taught at Ohio Wesleyan University and was a research fellow at Rice University.

He later became an Episcopal priest, and was the Rector of Christ Church, Port Tobacco, Maryland. As of 2020, he had retired from Episcopal ministry, and was living with his wife in Louisville, Kentucky.

== Selected works ==
- Trigg, Joseph W. (1983). Origen: The Bible and Philosophy in the Third-Century Church. John Knox Press. ISBN 9780804209458.
- Trigg, Joseph W.; Sachs, William L. (1986). Of One Body: Renewal Movements in the Church. John Knox Press. ISBN 9780804206778.
- Trigg, Joseph W. (1988). Biblical Interpretation. Michael Glazier. ISBN 9780894533495.
- Trigg, Joseph W. (1998). Origen. Psychology Press (now Routledge). ISBN 9780415118361.
- Trigg, Joseph W. (2021). Homilies on the Psalms: Codex Monacensis Graecus 314. The Catholic University of America Press. ISBN 9780813233192.
- Burns, J. Patout; Trigg, Joseph W. (2023). Theological Anthropology: Revised and Expanded Edition. Fortress Press. ISBN 9781506449401.
- Trigg, Joseph W.; Young, Robin Darling, eds. (2025). Teacher of the Logos: Essays on Origen's Rediscovered Last Work. The Catholic University of America Press. ISBN 9780813239668.

== See also ==
- Celsus
- Origen
- Origenist crises
