= Dak Pek Camp =

Former U.S. Army base near Kon Tum, Vietnam

Dak Pek Camp
- Kon Tum, Central Highlands in Vietnam
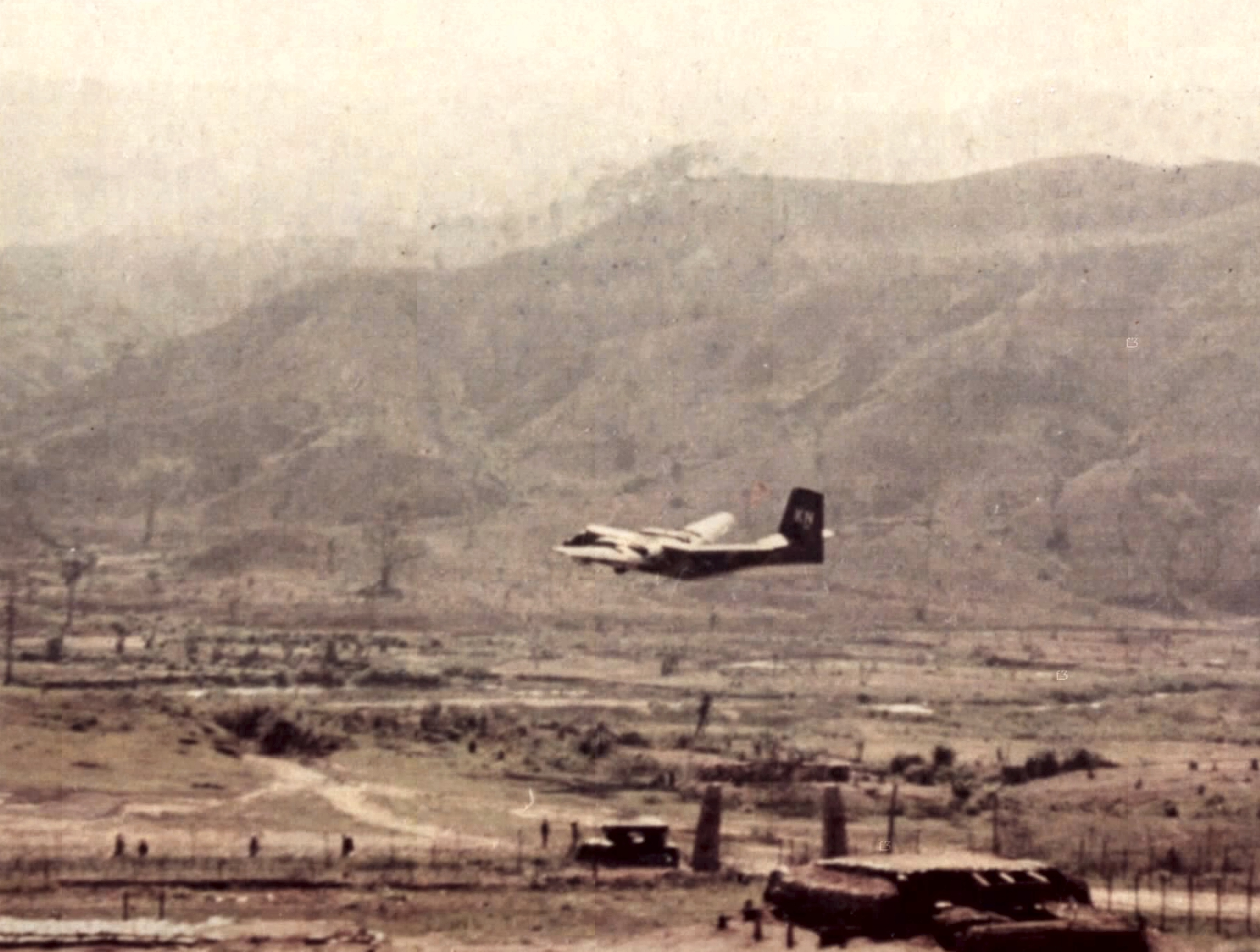
- A C-7A Caribou over Dak Pek Camp, 18 May 1970

Site information
- Operator: Army of the Republic of Vietnam (ARVN); United States Army (US Army)
- Condition: Abandoned

Location
- Shown within Vietnam
- Coordinates: 15°04′30″N 107°44′20″E

Site history
- Built: 1962
- In use: 1962-1973
- Battles/wars: Vietnam War; Battle of Dak To

Garrison information
- Garrison: 5th Special Forces Group

Airfield information
- Elevation: 2,297 feet (700 m) AMSL
Runways
Direction	Length and surface
00/00	1,500 feet (457 m) Laterite

Dak Pek Camp (also known as Dak Pek Special Forces Camp) is a former U.S. Army and Army of the Republic of Vietnam (ARVN) base northwest of Kon Tum in the Central Highlands of Vietnam.

== History ==
The 5th Special Forces Group first established a base at here in December 1962 to monitor communist infiltration along the Ho Chi Minh Trail. The base was located 14 km from the Laos border, 40 km south of Khâm Đức and approximately 85 km northwest of Kon Tum.

5th Special Forces Detachment A-749 was based here in October 1963, Detachment A-5 was based here in December 1964, Detachment A-211 was based here in 1965 and Detachment A-242 from October 1966. The base was also used as a launch site for MACV-SOG operations into Laos.

On 29 May 1968 a de Havilland Canada C-7B Caribou #62-4189 was hit by mortar fire as it landed at Dak Pek causing the right wing to separate, there were no casualties.

On 12 April 1970 a People's Army of Vietnam (PAVN) force estimated at two battalions attacked the camp. Sappers attacked many of the bunkers and the defenders were forced back to a small fighting position before air support forced the PAVN back. The siege of Dak Pek last until early May when the PAVN withdrew. Total losses were 34 CIDG and 420 PAVN killed. The PAVN simultaneously attacked the nearby Dak Seang Camp.

Other units based at Dak Pek included:

- 6th Battalion, 29th Artillery
- 57th Assault Helicopter Company (Bell AH-1G HueyCobra)
- 1st Battalion, 92nd Artillery

The base was transferred to 88th Border Rangers on 30 November 1970. In April 1972 Fairchild AC-119 AC-119K Stinger gunships killed 98 PAVN around Dak Pek.

In fighting near the camp on 27 April 1974, a document was captured indicating that an attack to capture Dak Pek was imminent. In early May, Ranger patrols detected the presence of a PAVN regiment near the camp and discovered a cache of 60 105mm artillery rounds. Unknown to the Rangers, the PAVN 29th Regiment, 324B Division had been trucked 75 miles (121 km) south from the A Sầu Valley. The Rangers had a series of encounters with PAVN patrols beginning on 10 May. Two days later, following artillery, rocket, and mortar bombardments, the PAVN attacked the outpost and subsector headquarters. The defenders were able to hold the PAVN infantry at bay until the morning of the 16th, when, following an intense concentration of fire support, the 29th Regiment, supported by tanks, closed in on the camp and subsector. RVNAF aircraft flew over 70 bombing and strafing sorties during the morning and destroyed at least one tank, despite PAVN 37mm antiaircraft fire. At midday on 16 May the PAVN captured the camp.

== Current use ==
The base has been turned over to forestry and housing and sits adjacent to the Ho Chi Minh Highway.
