= Gary B. Beikirch =

United States Army Medal of Honor recipient (1947–2021)

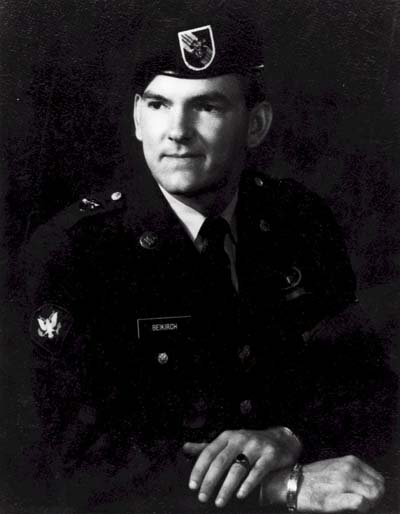
- Born: August 29, 1947; Rochester, New York
- Died: December 26, 2021 (aged 74); Rochester, New York
- Burial place: White Haven Memorial Park, Pittsford, New York
- Military career
- Allegiance: United States
- Branch: United States Army
- Service years: 1967–1971
- Rank: Sergeant
- Unit: 5th Special Forces Group
- Conflicts: Vietnam War
- Awards: Medal of Honor; Silver Star; Bronze Star Medal; Purple Heart (2); Cross of Gallantry (Vietnam)

Gary Burnell Beikirch (August 29, 1947 – December 26, 2021) was a United States Army soldier who received the United States military's highest decoration, the Medal of Honor, for his actions during the Vietnam War. A combat medic, Beikirch was awarded the medal for exposing himself to intense fire in order to rescue and treat the wounded, and for continuing to provide medical care despite his own serious wounds, during a battle at Dak Seang Camp.

== Early life ==
Beikirch was born on August 29, 1947, in Rochester, New York.

== Military service ==
Beikirch joined the United States Army in August 1967, just after finishing his second year of college in upstate New York. He was interested in becoming a Green Beret from the very beginning. He completed basic training at Fort Dix, New Jersey, and then went on to Fort Benning, Georgia, for jump school. He completed jump school, passed the Special Forces test and went on to training at Fort Bragg, North Carolina. After finishing phase one special forces training, he completed training to become a combat medic. During his time in the army, Beikirch served with the 3rd, 5th and 10th Special Forces Groups as a Light Weapons and Medical Specialist. He was sent to Vietnam in July 1969.

While serving as a sergeant with Company B of the 5th Special Forces Group, 1st Special Forces, Beikirch was stationed at Dak Seang Camp, home to Montagnard villagers and fighters, in the Central Highlands province of Kon Tum. On April 1, 1970, the camp was attacked by a numerically superior North Vietnamese force. While his Montagnard assistants treated the wounded, Beikirch fought back with a 4.2 inch mortar and, after that weapon was disabled by hostile fire, a machine gun. Learning that a fellow American soldier was wounded and lying in an exposed position, he ran through heavy fire to rescue the man. He was hit by shrapnel in the process, including one fragment which struck near his spine and partially paralyzed him. For the remainder of the battle he had his Montagnard assistants carry him from one position to another as he treated the injured. He was wounded in the side while giving mouth-to-mouth resuscitation to a Montagnard fighter and was then shot in the stomach. Despite this, he continued to provide medical care and fire his weapon from his stretcher until losing consciousness. He was evacuated by helicopter and spent six months recovering at Valley Forge Medical Center.

For his actions at Dak Seang, Beikirch was awarded the Medal of Honor. The medal was formally presented to him by President Richard Nixon on October 15, 1973.

== Later life and death ==
After his military service, Beikirch attended White Mountain Seminary in New Hampshire, graduating in 1975. He planned to go back to Vietnam and work in a missionary hospital in Kon Tum Province, where he had served in the army; however, the country fell to North Vietnamese forces before he could return. He instead worked as a pastor and received a master's degree in counseling. Since the mid-1980s he had worked as a school counselor at Greece Arcadia Middle School in his native Rochester, New York.

On September 22, 2012, the Second Battalion of the Fifth Special Forces Group (Airborne) dedicated a new battalion operations complex. The complex, formerly called "The Legion", was named Beikirch Hall in tribute to the former member of the unit.

He died from complications of prostate and pancreatic cancer in Greece, New York, on December 26, 2021, at the age of 74.

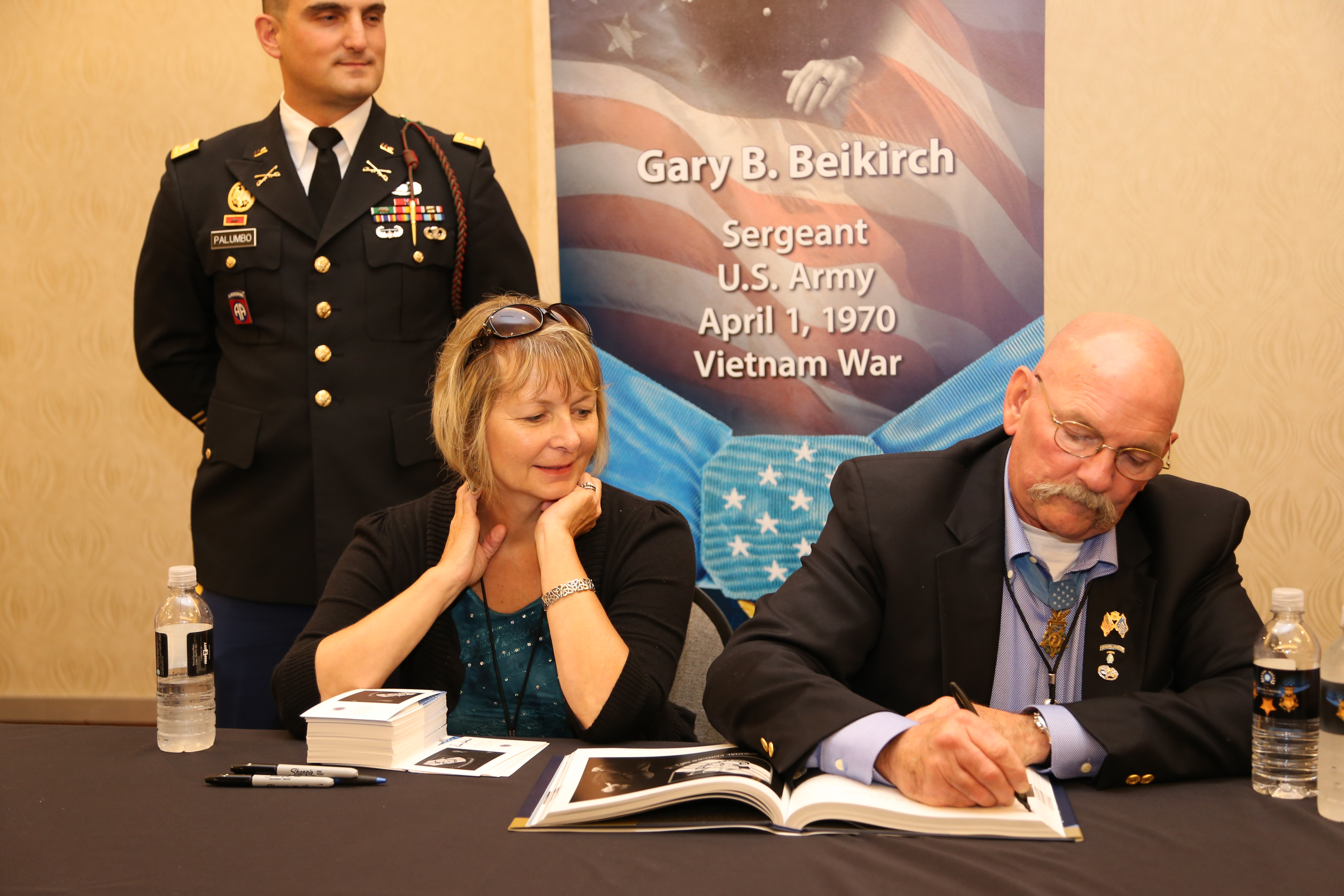
Beikirch in 2014

In addition to his wife and children, Gary Beikirch is survived by one brother, Larry Scott Beikirch of Cherokee County, Georgia.

== Military awards ==
Beikirch's military decorations and awards include:

- Medal of Honor
- Distinguished Service Cross (upgraded to the Medal of Honor)
- Silver Star
- Bronze Star Medal
- Purple Heart with oak leaf cluster
- National Defense Service Medal
- Vietnam Service Medal
- Vietnamese Cross of Gallantry with Silver Star
- Republic of Vietnam Campaign Medal
- Combat Infantryman Badge
- Parachutist Badge
- Special Forces Tab

=== Medal of Honor citation ===
Beikirch's official Medal of Honor citation reads:

OFFICIAL CITATION

The President of the United States of America, authorized by Act of Congress, March 3,

1863, has awarded in the name of Congress the Medal of Honor to

Sergeant Gary Burnell Beikirch

United States Army

For conspicuous gallantry and intrepidity in action at the risk of his life above and beyond the call of duty. Sgt. Beikirch, medical aidman, Detachment B-24, Company B, distinguished himself during the defense of Camp Dak Seang. The allied defenders suffered a number of casualties as a result of an intense, devastating attack launched by the enemy from well-concealed positions surrounding the camp. Sgt. Beikirch, with complete disregard for his personal safety, moved unhesitatingly through the withering enemy fire to his fallen comrades, applied first aid to their wounds and assisted them to the medical aid station. When informed that a seriously injured American officer was lying in an exposed position, Sgt. Beikirch ran immediately through the hail of fire. Although he was wounded seriously by fragments from an exploding enemy mortar shell, Sgt. Beikirch carried the officer to a medical aid station. Ignoring his own serious injuries, Sgt. Beikirch left the relative safety of the medical bunker to search for and evacuate other men who had been injured. He was again wounded as he dragged a critically injured Vietnamese soldier to the medical bunker while simultaneously applying mouth-to-mouth resuscitation to sustain his life. Sgt. Beikirch again refused treatment and continued his search for other casualties until he collapsed. Only then did he permit himself to be treated. Sgt. Beikirch's complete devotion to the welfare of his comrades, at the risk of his life are in keeping with the highest traditions of the military service and reflect great credit on him, his unit, and the U.S. Army.

== See also ==
- List of Medal of Honor recipients for the Vietnam War
