= Dixie, Henderson County, Kentucky =

Unincorporated community in Kentucky, United States

- Unincorporated community
- Location within Kentucky Location within the United States
- Coordinates: 37°40′47″N 87°41′09″W
- Country: United States
- State: Kentucky
- County: Henderson
- Elevation: 463 ft (141 m)
- Time zone: UTC-6 (Central (CST))
  - Summer (DST): UTC-5 (CDT)
- Area code: 270
- GNIS feature ID: 490918

Dixie (also Little Dixie) is an unincorporated community in Henderson County, Kentucky, United States.
