= Reed, Kentucky =

Unincorporated community in Kentucky, United States

- Unincorporated community
- Location within Kentucky Location within the United States
- Coordinates: 37°51′4″N 87°21′15″W
- Country: United States
- State: Kentucky
- County: Henderson
- Elevation: 377 ft (115 m)
- Time zone: UTC-6 (Central (CST))
  - Summer (DST): UTC-5 (CST)
- ZIP codes: 42451
- GNIS feature ID: 501690

Reed is an unincorporated community in Henderson County, Kentucky, United States, mostly along US Highway 60. It is 14 miles driving distance from the downtown of the city of Henderson to the East and 19.3 miles driving distance from the downtown of the city of Owensboro to the West.

A post office was opened in Reed 1891 and continues to operate.

Reed has an all volunteer fire station.

Reed Consolidated School opened in 1936 and served students until 1955, when it closed and students were sent to the highschool in Spottsville.

There are five cemeteries in Reed:

- Saint Augustine Catholic Church Cemetery
- Mount Zion General Baptist Church Cemetery
- Fulton Cemetery
- Birk Cemetery
- Remole Cemetery
