= Weaverton, Henderson County, Kentucky =

Unincorporated community in Kentucky, United States

Weaverton
- Neighborhood of Henderson, Kentucky
- Location within Kentucky Location within the United States
- Coordinates: 37°48′56″N 87°35′2″W
- Country: United States
- State: Kentucky
- County: Henderson
- Elevation: 397 ft (121 m)
- Time zone: UTC-6 (Central (CST))
  - Summer (DST): UTC-5 (CST)
- GNIS feature ID: 506322

Weaverton is an unincorporated community and coal town located in Henderson, Kentucky, United States. This neighborhood is often referred to as the East End of the South Side of town today. Its boundaries are Loeb St to the east, Atkison St to the south, Madison St to the west, Mill St to the north, Pringle St to the west, Meadow St to the north connecting to the corner of Loeb St. Weaverton High School, now Weaverton Apartments, being the remaining site of this old unincorporated place is the territorial feature of this neighborhood area.

== History ==
Although East End residents are vague as to geographic lines that separate Audubon, Audubon Heights and Weaverton, farmers from the southern portion of the county knew Weaverton well from the 1870s until relatively recent times.

George Vogel started a general merchandise business in 1871; had a watering trough for the horses and refreshment for the farmer. In later years, two coal mines were opened, corn bins and a stockyard were built, so the farmer could exchange produce for necessities. Many times the "trip to town" stopped in Weaverton.

The Weaverton Milling Co. was formed in 1911 and in 1913 the Weaverton Lumber Company succeeded Ambrose Lumber Yards. The Kleymeyer Brickyards (1868) might be considered part of Weaverton, if Clay Street is accepted as the boundary, although Henry Kleymeyer's house was on a hill overlooking Audubon.

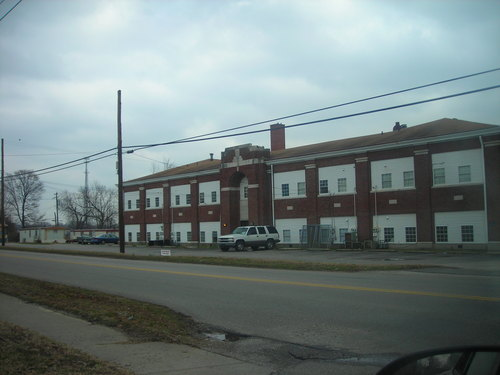
Weaverton Grade School

The old Weaverton grade school (east of Atkinson Street, off Pringle) existed as far back as 1889 and was torn down in 1916 or 1918. Both it and the old Audubon School were in the county system. In 1957, schools serving the neighborhood were desegregated. It is said that three young black males, James W. Clancey Jr., Shane Dunise Bushrod and Alvin Eugene Barnes, from the Brookstown neighborhood on US 60 at the west city limits, stepped forward to test whether the Declaration of Independence really meant that part about all men being treated equal. The three signed up to attend Weaverton Elementary School, being the first local black students ever to register to attend classes as equals with white students. The matter kicked off the incident where 570 White children walked out of Weaverton Elementary School protesting the enrollment of five Negro pupils. About half of the 872 children remained in class.

In 1903 the Coquillard Wagon Works moved from South Bend, IN to its new plant in Weaverton, built right over the swimming hole the Vogel boys had been using. When local merchants and others bought stock, the name was changed to Henderson Wagon Works and 600 horse-drawn wagons were produced annually, until the money panic of 1913–14 caused Sears, Roebuck Co. to stop buying them. Later it was used by Heinz Cannery and Atlas Tack Co. The factory (near the north boundary of the Weaverton area) was destroyed by a massive fire during the summer of 1978. Witnesses reported that smoke and flame could be seen 10–15 miles to the west of the site on U.S. 60.
