= Dak Seang Camp =

Former US Army and Army of the Republic of Vietnam base in Vietnam

Dak Seang Camp (Dak Seang Airfield)
- Kon Tum, Central Highlands in Vietnam
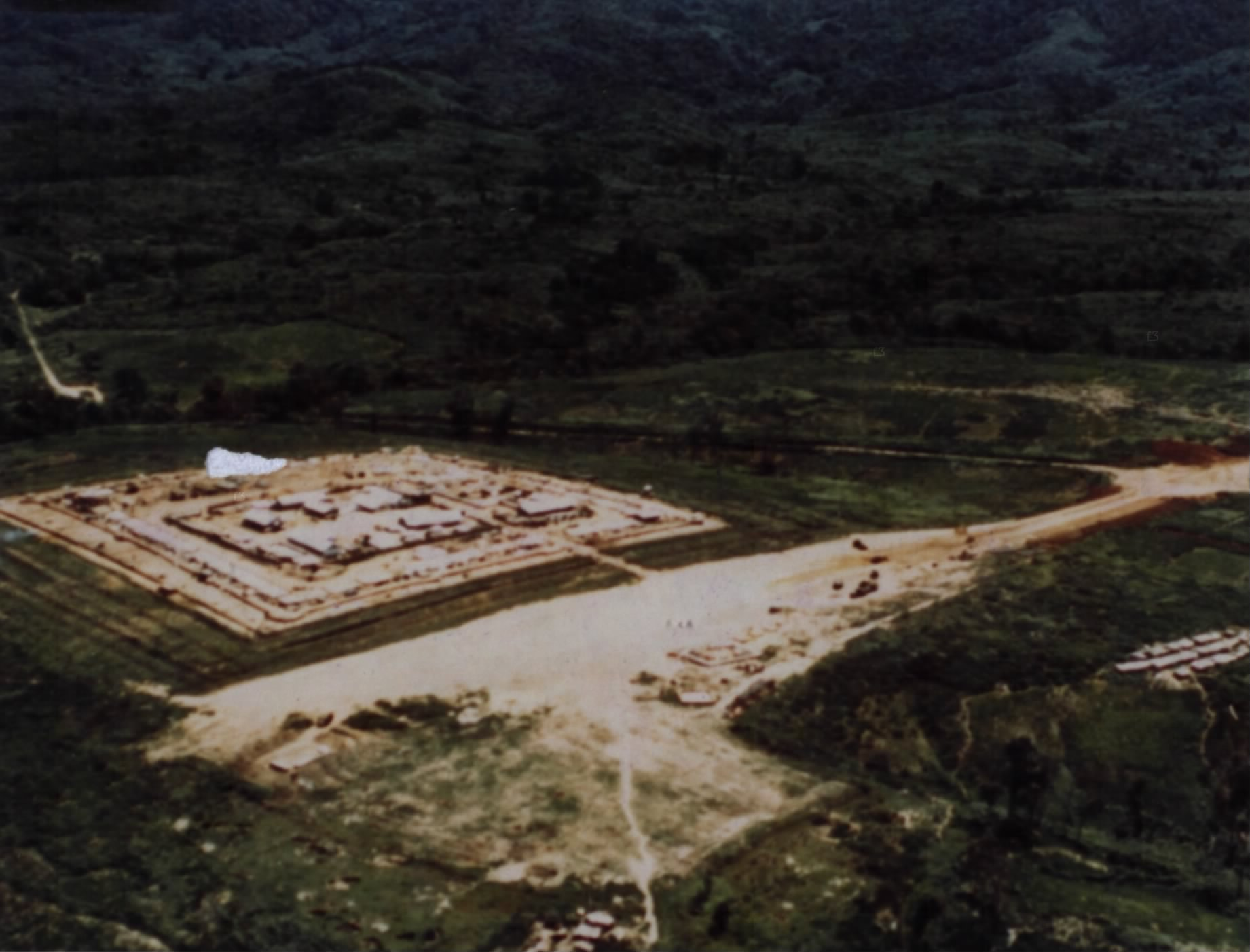
- Dak Seang Camp, 19 July 1968

Site information
- Type: Army Base
- Operator: Army of the Republic of Vietnam (ARVN); United States Army (U.S. Army)
- Condition: Abandoned

Location
- Shown within Vietnam
- Coordinates: 14.826°N 107.686°E

Site history
- Built: 1964
- In use: 1964-1972
- Battles/wars: Vietnam War; Battle of Dak To

Garrison information
- Garrison: 5th Special Forces Group

Airfield information
- Elevation: 2,156 feet (657 m) AMSL
Runways
Direction	Length and surface
00/00	1,400 feet (427 m) Clay

Dak Seang Camp (also known as Dak Seang Special Forces Camp) is a former US Army and Army of the Republic of Vietnam (ARVN) base northwest of Kon Tum in the Central Highlands of Vietnam.

== History ==
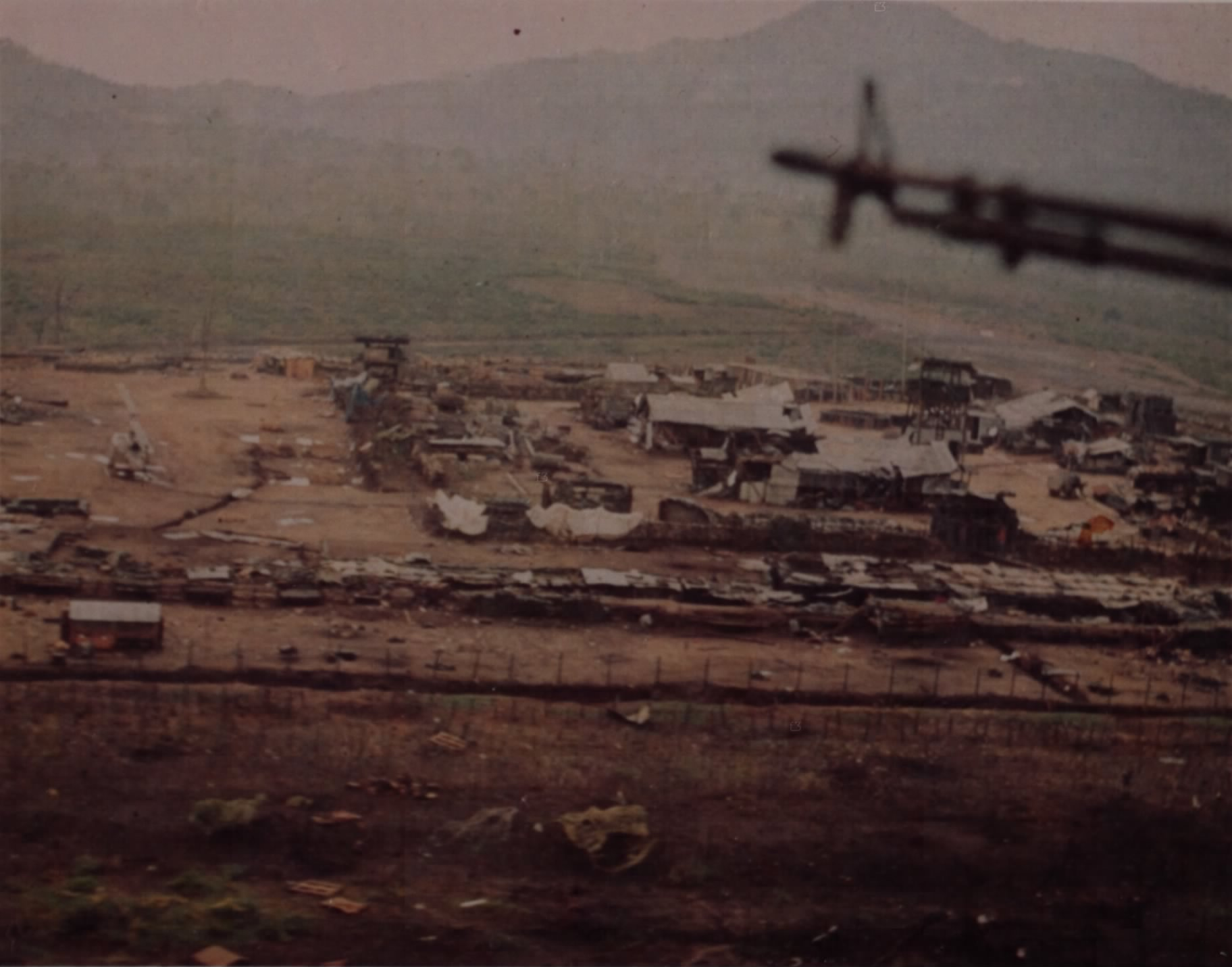
Dak Seang Camp, 9 May 1970

The 5th Special Forces Group and CIDG forces first established a base at here in 1964 to monitor communist infiltration along the Ho Chi Minh Trail. The base was located 10 km from the Laotian border, 23 km northwest of Đắk Tô and approximately 64 km northwest of Kon Tum.

5th Special Forces Detachment A-245 was based here in October 1966.

On 18 August 1968 the People's Army of Vietnam (PAVN) 101D Regiment, supported by artillery attacked the camp. The attack was beaten back with small arms and artillery fire.

On 1 April 1970 the PAVN attacked the camp starting a siege that lasted until 8 May. At the same time the PAVN attacked the Dak Pek Camp. On 15 April 1970 the 170th Assault Helicopter Company dropped the 3rd Battalion, 42nd ARVN Regiment into a landing zone near Dak Seang, resulting in the loss of two helicopters. Sergeant Gary B. Beikirch a 5th Special Forces Group medic would be awarded the Medal of Honor for his actions during the siege. SFC Gary L. Littrell would be awarded the Medal of Honor for his actions during the siege as an advisor to the ARVN 23rd Battalion, 2nd Ranger Group.

On 29 October 1972, following a 1,000+ round artillery barrage, the PAVN attacked the camp forcing its 300 Ranger defenders to abandon it by nightfall.

== Shootdowns ==
- 2 April 1970: de Havilland Canada C-7A Caribou #61-2406 was shot down while dropping supplies, killing all three crew
- 4 April 1970: C-7B Caribou #62-4180 was shot down while dropping supplies, killing all three crew
- 6 April 1970: C-7B Caribou #63-9746 was shot down while dropping supplies, killing all three crew
- 15 April 1970: Bell UH-1H Huey #68-16203 was shot down while landing ARVN troops, resulting in two US and two ARVN killed
- 15 April 1970: Sikorsky HH-3E Jolly Green Giant #66-13280 of the 37th Aerospace Rescue and Recovery Squadron was shot down while trying to rescue the crew of UH-1H #68-16203, resulting in one crewman killed

== Current use ==
The base has been turned over to forest and housing adjacent to the Ho Chi Minh Highway.
