= Henderson County High School =

Coordinates: 37°49′38″N 87°33′36″W

Location
- 2424 Zion Road; Henderson, Kentucky 42420; United States

Information
- Type: High school
- Motto: Colonels are committed, caring, and confident. #Live Long and Charge On
- Established: 1954
- School district: Henderson County Schools
- Principal: Amber Thomas
- Faculty: 143
- Teaching staff: 117.00 (FTE)
- Enrollment: 1,928 (2023–2024)
- Student to teacher ratio: 16.48
- Color
- Mascot: Colonel
- Website: hchs.henderson.kyschools.us

Henderson County High School (HCHS) is the only high school in Henderson County, Kentucky and is among the largest high schools in Kentucky, with roughly 2,000 students enrolled in grades 9–12 each year.

== History ==
Henderson County High School was established in 1954, per the merger of various individual high schools outside of the Henderson city limits. Its first home was at 1707 Second Street in Henderson. It relocated to its current premises on 2424 Zion Road (which is actually further down the same road as its previous home) in 1969.

Over the years, other high schools in rural areas of the county, such as Corydon High School, closed and the students moved to Henderson County High School.

In 1976, the last other high school in Henderson County, Henderson City High School, closed, and all of its students moved to Henderson County High School.

North Middle School is located on the old High School grounds at 1707 Second Street.

== Structure ==
The school is divided into four student units that cut across all grade levels; red, green, blue and the career and technical unit which act somewhat as separately functioning high schools. Students from different units can have classes outside their home unit. Every unit has its own set of principals and guidance counselors equipped to meet each student's needs. All the units also share a coordinating principal with overall control for the school. There is also a technology education unit in the school.

== Sports ==
- Boys' sports teams at HCHS include:

- Baseball
- Basketball
- Football
- Golf
- Soccer
- Tennis
- Swimming
- Track
- Wrestling
- Bowling

- Girls' sports teams at HCHS include:

- Basketball
- Golf
- Soccer
- Softball
- Tennis
- Swimming
- Track
- Volleyball
- Cheerleading

- Co-ed teams

- Archery
- Academic Team
- Bowling

- Separate Fall Sports

- Marching band

== Notable alumni ==
- Sam Ball
- Rebecca Broussard
- Gregg Hale
