= Henderson Gleaner =

Daily American newspaper

The Henderson Gleaner
- Type: Daily newspaper
- Owner: USA Today Co.
- Founder: Clarence Christian (C .C.) Givens
- Founded: 1883
- Language: English
- Headquarters: Henderson, Kentucky
- Circulation: 8, 612 Daily; 9,692 Sunday (as of March 2013)
- Sister newspapers: Evansville Courier & Press
- Website: thegleaner.com

The Henderson Gleaner (also known as The Gleaner) is the daily newspaper in Henderson, Kentucky. The newspaper is published Tuesday through Sunday mornings. It has not been published on Mondays since it was founded in the 1880s.

The Gleaner was locally owned for more than a century, but was purchased by A. H. Belo in March 1997, before being acquired by the E. W. Scripps Company on October 31, 2000, becoming part of the Evansville Courier & Press. Scripps later divested their newspaper holdings, and on April 1, 2015, the Journal Media Group took over as owners of the paper. In April 2016, Gannett acquired Journal Media Group, including The Gleaner.

== History ==
The Gleaner was founded by Clarence Christian Givens in 1883 in Providence, Kentucky, approximately 35 miles south of Henderson. Givens remained there for six months, then moved his newspaper farther south to Madisonville, Kentucky. In July 1885, Givens relocated the newspaper to Henderson. It became a daily publication in 1888, with the exception that it produced no Monday edition, and was published as the Henderson Morning Gleaner.

The Gleaner was not the city's first newspaper; The Columbian was first published in 1823, and the Henderson Reporter was in print from 1853 to 1885. At least a dozen other newspapers have also operated in Henderson at various times, but few copies of those papers have survived.

The Henderson Morning Gleaner competed with the Henderson Evening Journal for several years. By 1909, the Evening Journal was losing $500 a week and had been taken over by its bank. Leigh Harris of Illinois, bought the Journal, and his first editorial consisted of the single sentence: "I have come to Henderson to run a newspaper". In around 1920, Harris and the Givens family negotiated a merger of the Gleaner and Journal, creating the Henderson Gleaner and Journal. The word "Journal" was dropped from the masthead in 1973. Harris later bought out C. C. Givens altogether, becoming the city's sole newspaper publisher. Harris chaired numerous Henderson causes and committees, including serving as chairman of the local American Red Cross chapter during the Ohio River flood of 1937. Henderson was one of the few cities along the Ohio River that escaped the floodwaters of 1937, owing to its position on a bluff well above the river. Harris noted in the newspaper that Henderson was "on the Ohio but never in it", using that as a marketing tool as he and other prominent citizens worked to attract new industries to the city.

After Harris' death in 1955, his family leased the newspaper to J. Albert Dear of Jersey City, New Jersey. His company, Dear Publication and Radio Inc., bought the newspaper outright two years later. In 1960, the Dear family sent a son, Walter Dear II, to Henderson to serve as promotions manager. He became editor in 1963 and later served as publisher. Dear promoted the community, and was among the city's primary fundraisers for community improvements such as a new YMCA building, a Fine Arts Center on the Henderson Community College campus, a new Salvation Army center and other projects.

When the newspaper dropped the word "Journal" from its masthead on April 27, 1973, it also changed the print to lower case, as "the gleaner". It renamed so until August 10, 1997, when the name returned to upper case, as "The Gleaner."

The newspaper constructed a new office and printing plant at 455 Klutey Park Plaza in the city suburbs, relocating there in 1976. In 1986, Walt and Martha Dear and their children bought The Gleaner, several other western Kentucky weekly newspapers, and a small radio station in Franklin, Kentucky, from the rest of their family. They later also acquired the Union County Advocate in Morganfield, Kentucky.

In 1997, the Dear family sold The Gleaner and other media holdings to the A. H. Belo Corp., a Texas media company that owns The Dallas Morning News. Belo had purchased The Messenger-Inquirer in nearby Owensboro a year earlier. Belo subsequently decided that the two Kentucky newspapers were not core to their business of operating newspapers and television stations in larger high-growth markets, particularly in the Southwest and Pacific Northwest.

Belo sold The Gleaner to Scripps in 2000, making it a sister paper to the Evansville Courier & Press. Like Belo, the Courier and E. W. Scripps left The Gleaner editorially independent, although Henderson readers later criticized the decision to merge The Gleaner and Courier & Press classified advertising. The Gleaner's website is merged into a separate section on the Courier & Press Website.

In 2015, Scripps withdrew from the newspaper business to focus on broadcasting. It sold its newspapers, including The Gleaner, to the newly formed Journal Media Group on April 1, 2015.

Gannett acquired Journal Media Group effective April 8, 2016. Gleaner staff-written stories are now labeled as being associated with the USA TODAY Network, which references Gannett's flagship newspaper, USA Today.

The Gleaner's last office in Henderson, Kentucky was at 455 Klutey Park Plaza Drive. The building is now home to a nonprofit service youth with mental health issues. Reporters and photographers whose work is published in The Gleaner are now based out of offices in Evansville, Indiana.

== Notable people ==
- Three former Gleaner photojournalists went on to receive the Pulitzer Prize for their work at other newspapers.
  - Henderson native William Snyder has won or shared in three Pulitzers (in 1986, 1991 and 1993) for his work at The Dallas Morning News, and in 2006 as director of photography of the newspaper, eight members of his staff won a Pulitzer.
  - Keith Williams, also a native of Henderson, shared in a 1976 Pulitzer with The Courier-Journal in Louisville, Kentucky.
  - J. Scott Applewhite has shared two Pulitzers (in 1993 and 1999) for his work with The Associated Press.
- Both former Gleaner publisher and owner Walt Dear and retired editor Ron Jenkins were inducted into the Kentucky Journalism Hall of Fame at the University of Kentucky's School of Journalism and Telecommunications. Dear was inducted in 1999. Jenkins was inducted in April 2007.
- In 2016, longtime Gleaner reporters and columnists Chuck and Donna Stinnett were also inducted into the Kentucky Journalism Hall of Fame. They are the second husband/wife duo from the Gleaner to be so honored. Columnist Judy Jenkins was posthumously inducted into the Hall of Fame in 2015, joining her husband, Ron.
- Journalist and photo agency owner Ewing Galloway was a reporter for the Gleaner.

== Bibliography ==
- "Newspaper takes on new name, building". (May 13, 1979). The Gleaner, p. 34.
- Armstrong, Francele Harris, Leigh and Jane—A Love Story. (The Carlton Press, 1974)
- "E.W. Scripps to buy Gleaner," (October 6, 2000). The Gleaner, p. A-1
- "A newspaper's history (A capsule history of The Gleaner)," (October 6, 2000). The Gleaner, p. A-1.
- Letters to the Editor concerning classified ad changes, (March 24, 2001); (March 31, 2001); and (April 4, 2001). The Gleaner, p. A-4.
- "Change is an unsettling thing" column by Gleaner Editor Ron Jenkins, (March 18, 2001). The Gleaner, p. A-4.
