= Carl D. Melton =

American politician

Carl Melton

Member of the Kentucky House of Representatives from the 14th district
- In office January 1, 1954 – January 1, 1958
- Preceded by: Thomas R. Duncan
- Succeeded by: John Alves Clore

Personal details
- Born: October 14, 1927 Henderson, Kentucky, U.S.
- Died: August 17, 2016 (aged 88) Louisville, Kentucky, U.S.
- Party: Democratic
- Education: University of Louisville (LLB)

Military service
- Branch/service: United States Army
- Unit: United States Army Air Forces
- Battles/wars: World War II

Carl D. Melton (October 14, 1927 – August 17, 2016) was an American attorney, judge, and politician.

== Early life and education ==
A native of Henderson, Kentucky, Melton served in the United States Army Air Forces during World War II. In 1951, he received his law degree from the University of Louisville School of Law.

== Career ==
Melton worked as a commonwealth's attorney and county attorney. Melton was also a member of the Kentucky House of Representatives from 1954 to 1958 as a Democrat. He later served as a judge on the Kentucky Circuit Court.

== Death ==
Melton died at Baptist Health Louisville in Louisville, Kentucky.
