= Gary L. Littrell =

United States Army Medal of Honor recipient (born 1944)

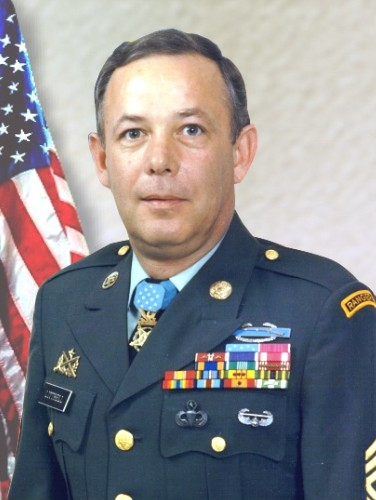
- Born: October 26, 1944 (age 81); Henderson, Kentucky, U.S.
- Military career
- Allegiance: United States
- Branch: United States Army
- Service years: 1961–1985
- Rank: Command Sergeant Major
- Conflicts: Vietnam War
- Awards: Medal of Honor; Legion of Merit; Bronze Star Medal (3); Purple Heart; Meritorious Service Medal; Air Medal; Army Commendation Medal; Cross of Gallantry (Vietnam)
- Other work: President, Congressional Medal of Honor Society

Gary Lee Littrell (born October 26, 1944) is a retired United States Army command sergeant major who, while serving as an adviser to Army of the Republic of Vietnam's Ranger units during the Vietnam War, acted with extraordinary courage during a four-day siege on his battalion, for which he was awarded the Medal of Honor.

== Medal of Honor action ==
Between April 4 and April 8, 1970, while serving on Advisory Team 21 of I Corps Advisory Group, in Kontum Province, Republic of Vietnam, Sergeant First Class Littrell was a Light Weapons Infantry Advisor with the 23rd Battalion, 2nd Ranger Group. The battalion was under intense mortar attack — one advisor was killed and all except Littrell were severely wounded. Unrelentingly, over four days, Littrell kept the battalion inspired, while he directed artillery and air support, distributed ammunition, strengthened faltering defenses, cared for the wounded, and shouted encouragement to the Vietnamese in their own language. For his "sustained extraordinary courage and selflessness", he was awarded the Medal of Honor.

The Medal of Honor was presented to Littrell in a White House ceremony by President Richard Nixon on October 15, 1973.

== Medal of Honor citation ==
Medal of Honor

The President of the United States of America, authorized by Act of Congress, March 3, 1863, has awarded in the name of The Congress the Medal of Honor to

SERGEANT FIRST CLASS GARY L. LITTRELL
UNITED STATES ARMY

For conspicuous gallantry and intrepidity in action at the risk of his life above and beyond the call of duty. Sfc. Littrell, U.S. Military Assistance Command, Vietnam, Advisory Team 21, distinguished himself while serving as a Light Weapons Infantry Advisor with the 23d Battalion, 2nd Ranger Group, Republic of Vietnam Army, near Dak Seang. After establishing a defensive perimeter on a hill on April 4, the battalion was subjected to an intense enemy mortar attack which killed the Vietnamese commander, one adviser, and seriously wounded all the advisors except Sfc. Littrell. During the ensuing 4 days, Sfc. Littrell exhibited near superhuman endurance as he singlehandedly bolstered the besieged battalion. Repeatedly abandoning positions of relative safety, he directed artillery and air support by day and marked the unit's location by night, despite the heavy, concentrated enemy fire. His dauntless will instilled in the men of the 23d Battalion a deep desire to resist. Assault after assault was repulsed as the battalion responded to the extraordinary leadership and personal example exhibited by Sfc. Littrell as he continuously moved to those points most seriously threatened by the enemy, redistributed ammunition, strengthened faltering defenses, cared for the wounded and shouted encouragement to the Vietnamese in their own language. When the beleaguered battalion was finally ordered to withdraw, numerous ambushes were encountered. Sfc. Littrell repeatedly prevented widespread disorder by directing air strikes to within 50 meters of their position. Through his indomitable courage and complete disregard for his safety, he averted excessive loss of life and injury to the members of the battalion. The sustained extraordinary courage and selflessness displayed by Sfc. Littrell over an extended period of time were in keeping with the highest traditions of the military service and reflect great credit on him and the U.S. Army.

== Honors ==
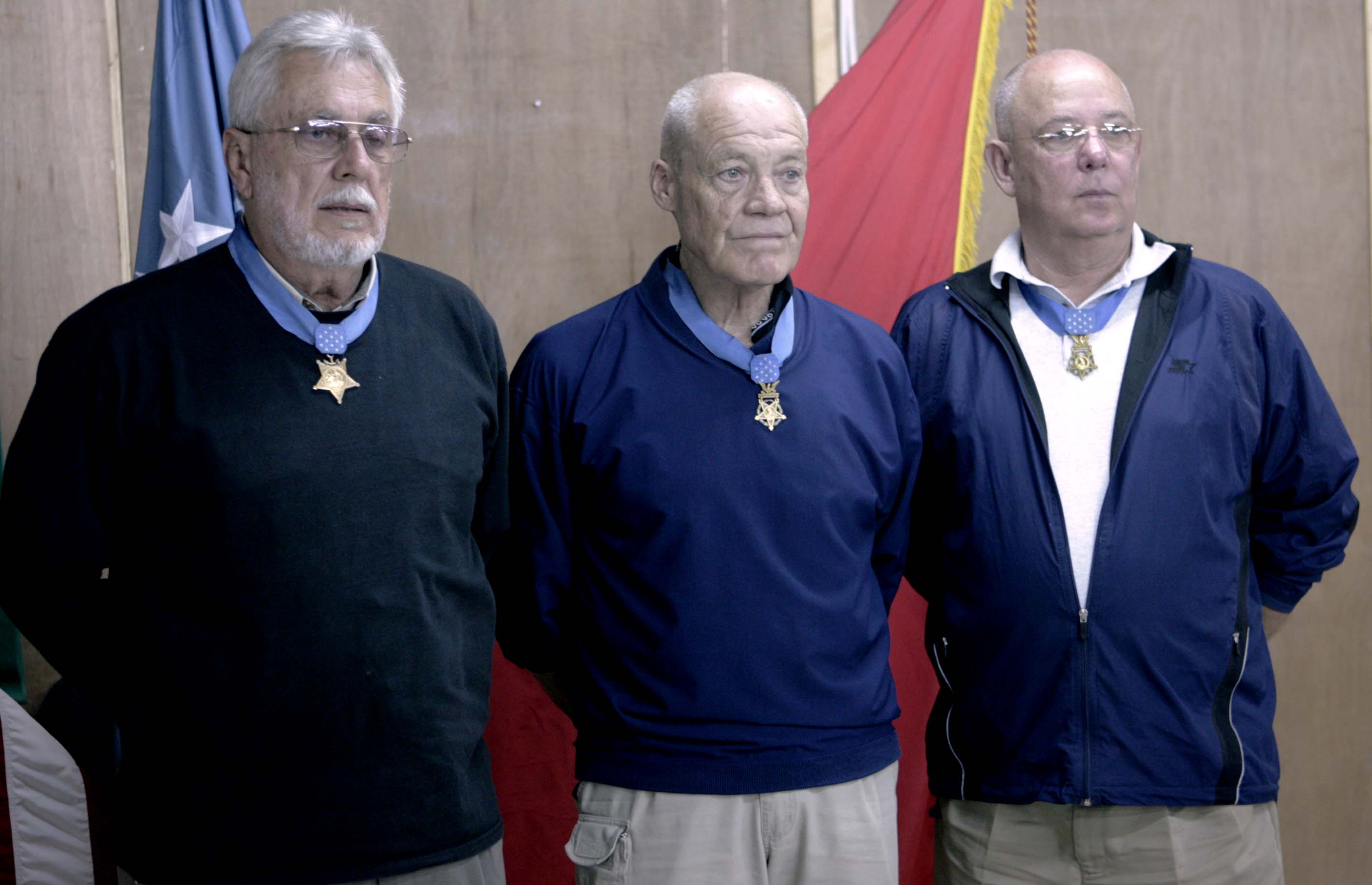
Capt. John J. McGinty, III (left), Col. Robert L. Howard (center), and CSM Gary L. Littrell (right) at Camp Taqaddum, Iraq on November 11, 2006.

In 1993, Littrell was inducted into the Ranger Hall of Fame, which serves to "honor and preserve the contributions of the most extraordinary U.S. Rangers in American history, to identify and highlight individuals as role models for current era Rangers, and to educate the public on the culture of the U.S. Army Rangers."

== In later years ==
Littrell retired from the army in 1985 as a command sergeant major.

As of October 1987, Littrell resides in St. Pete Beach, Florida. He used to participate in the Medal of Honor Foundation's Character Development Program as a speaker. Currently, he speaks to students through his own foundation, Tribute To Valor, where he promotes the six core values of The Medal of Honor: courage, sacrifice, patriotism, citizenship, integrity, and commitment. When addressing high school students in the area, he emphasizes the significance of leading a virtuous life, highlighting that "Integrity is the most important word in the world."

In October 2024, Littrell joined 15 other Medal of Honor recipients in publicly endorsing Donald Trump for president.

== See also ==
- List of Medal of Honor recipients for the Vietnam War
