= Sam Ball =

American football player (1944–2023)

- Sam Ball, 1970

No. 73
- Position: Offensive tackle

Personal information
- Born: June 1, 1944; Henderson, Kentucky, U.S.
- Died: October 30, 2023 (aged 79); Henderson, Kentucky, U.S.
- Listed height: 6 ft 4 in (1.93 m)
- Listed weight: 250 lb (113 kg)

Career information
- High school: Henderson County (KY)
- College: Kentucky (1962-1965)
- NFL draft: 1966: 1st round, 15th overall pick
- AFL draft: 1966: 2nd round, 14th overall pick

Career history
- Baltimore Colts (1966–1970)

Awards and highlights
- Super Bowl champion (V); NFL champion (1968); Consensus All-American (1965); First-team All-SEC (1965)

Career NFL statistics
- Games played: 61
- Games started: 42
- Fumble recoveries: 2
- Stats at Pro Football Reference

Samuel Davis Ball (June 1, 1944 – October 30, 2023) was an American professional football player who was an offensive lineman for the Baltimore Colts of the National Football League (NFL) from 1966 through 1970. During that span, he appeared in Super Bowl III and Super Bowl V for the Colts. He played college football at Kentucky.

== Early life ==
Sam Ball was born on June 1, 1944, in Henderson, Kentucky. He was a four-year starter at Henderson County High School where the Colonels posted a 32–2–2 record during his tenure.

== College career ==
Ball enrolled at University of Kentucky in 1962, played on the freshman team his first year because then NCAA rules that didn't allow freshmen to play on the varsity teams. He was a three-year letterman under Coach Charlie Bradshaw. As a senior, he earned All-SEC First-Team and All-America First-Team honors.

== Professional career ==
In the 1966 NFL draft, Ball was selected by the Baltimore Colts in the first round with the 15th overall pick. Ball was also drafted in the 1966 AFL draft by the New York Jets in the 2nd round, 14th overall. Ball chose to play with the Colts.

Ball saw limited playing time as a rookie in 1966, making appearances in seven games. He earned a starting role the next year, which he maintained for most of his career.

In the 1968 season, the Colts won the NFL Championship before losing to the Jets in Super Bowl III. In 1970, Ball was a member of the Colts' Super Bowl V winning team, which was his last professional football game.

== Post-football life ==
Ball returned to Henderson, Kentucky after retiring from professional football. He was a seed salesman, ran a cattle ranch, and was served as a motivational speaker.

== Death and legacy ==
Ball died in Henderson, Kentucky, on October 30, 2023, at the age of 79.
