= Baskett, Kentucky =

Unincorporated community in Kentucky, United States

- Unincorporated community
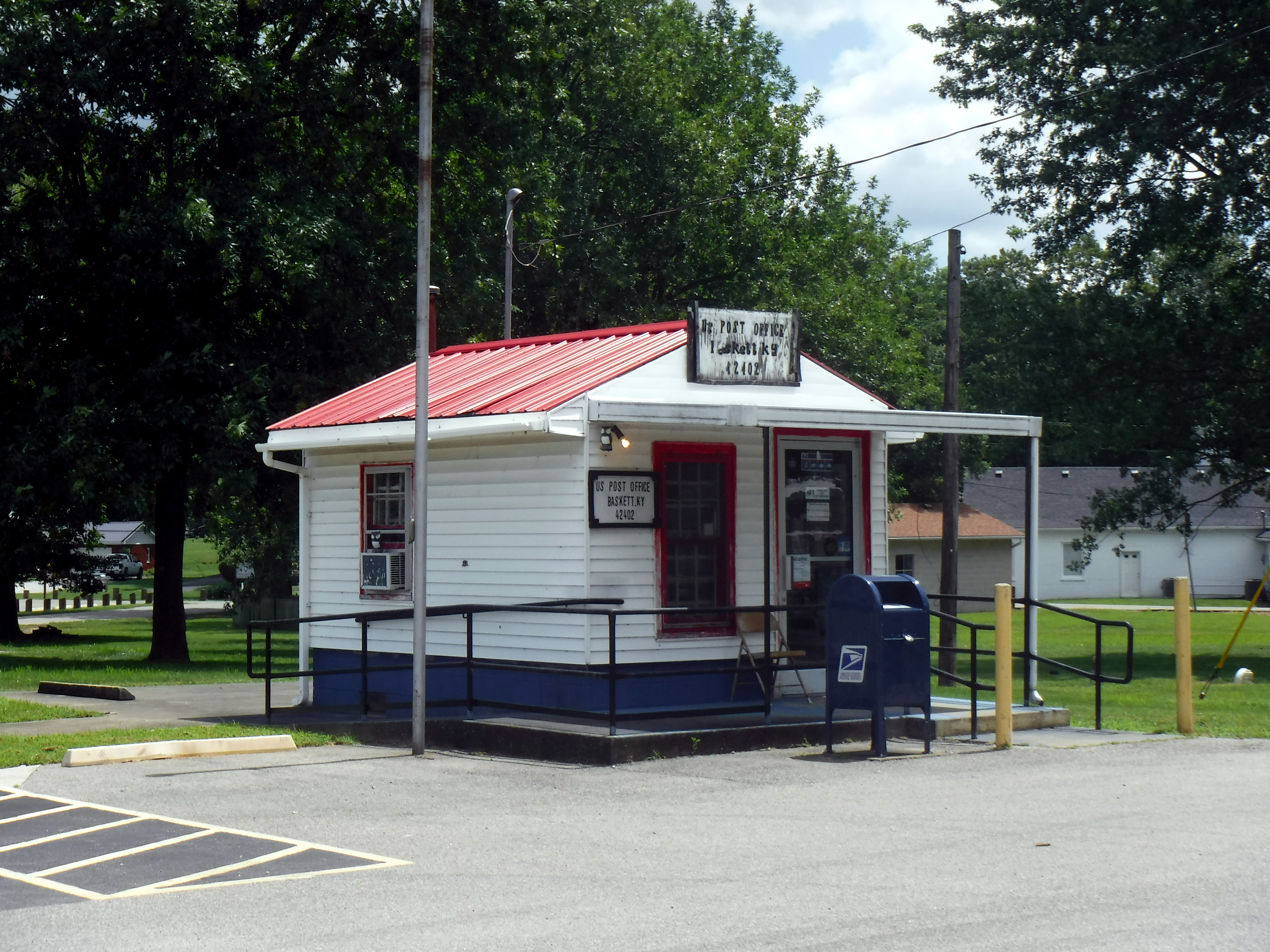
- Post office

- Location within Kentucky Location within the United States
- Coordinates: 37°52′15″N 87°27′45″W
- Country: United States
- State: Kentucky
- County: Henderson
- Elevation: 400 ft (120 m)
- Time zone: UTC-6 (Central (CST))
  - Summer (DST): UTC-5 (CST)
- ZIP codes: 42402
- GNIS feature ID: 486457

Baskett is an unincorporated community and coal town in Henderson County, Kentucky, United States.

== History ==
Baskett had its start in 1888 as a coal town. The community was named for the Baskett family, the original owners of the town site. A post office has been in operation at Baskett since 1890.
