= Thomas Allin (politician) =

- Born: May 14, 1757; Hanover County, Virginia
- Died: June 26, 1833 (aged 76); Mercer County, Kentucky
- Burial place: Springhill Cemetery
- Military career
- Allegiance: Thirteen Colonies, United States
- Branch: North Carolina militia, Continental Army, Virginia militia
- Rank: Major
- Conflicts: Revolutionary War, Northwest Indian War
- Other work: Surveyor, Clerk

Thomas Allin (May 14, 1757 – June 26, 1833) was a soldier and surveyor who became an early settler and political leader in Kentucky. He served in the Revolutionary War, first in the North Carolina militia and then as part of general Nathanael Greene's campaign.

Following the war, Allin settled in the Kentucky district of Virginia. He participated in the Northwest Indian War, fighting with future Kentucky governor Charles Scott. He then became the surveyor for the Transylvania Company, laying out the towns of Harrodsburg and Henderson. He served for many years as county clerk and circuit court clerk in Mercer County, Kentucky. He was succeeded in these offices by two of his sons. He died of cholera on June 26, 1833.

== Early life and military career ==
Thomas Allin was born the son of William and Frances (Grant) Allin in Hanover County, Virginia, on May 14, 1757. The following year, the family moved to Granville County, North Carolina, where Allin was raised on the family farm.

Allin enlisted as a private in the North Carolina militia shortly after the beginning of the Revolutionary War. Later, he served in the army of general Nathaneal Greene and participated in the Battle of Guilford Courthouse.

Allin's first visit to Kentucky was in 1780. In 1781, he moved to St. Asaph's (now Stanford) in Lincoln County. He was chosen as deputy surveyor for Lincoln County, and in 1782, he became the county's deputy sheriff. He held both positions until approximately 1786. He surveyed the land for the site of what is now Lexington, Kentucky, and as compensation, received the land that Newport, Kentucky, now occupies. He later lost this land in a lawsuit.

According to Lewis, Allin service record in the American Revolution included:

- 1779, a private in the Granville County Regiment
- 1780, a Commissary under Lt. Col. Thomas Farmer in the Orange County Regiment
- Brigade Forage Master under Brig. Gen. (Pro Tempore) William Lee Davidson in the Salisbury District Brigade of Militia.
- a Private again.

As a captain in the Northwest Indian War (1785–1795), Allin commanded a company of mounted infantry under General Charles Scott in Indiana, and participated in the Battle of Tippecanoe. Before the end of this enlistment, he was promoted to major and served as quartermaster and commissary.

== Settlement in Kentucky ==
Following the war, Allin moved to Danville, Kentucky, where he became a deputy clerk for the Supreme Court of the District of Kentucky, serving in the office of Christopher Greenup. He held this post until 1792. After the creation of Mercer County, Kentucky, in 1786, he was chosen as the first county clerk and the clerk of the circuit court. He represented Mercer County to the Virginia constitutional convention in June 1788. He and ten other delegates from the Kentucky district voted against the new constitution; three Kentucky delegates voted for the new constitution, and one abstained.

On February 16, 1787, Allin married Mary Jouett of Albemarle County, Virginia. Jouett was the aunt of noted painter Matthew Harris Jouett. They had ten children. Both Allin and his wife were both members of the Christian Church.

Allin was invited to become a member of the Danville Political Club at the club's second meeting, and served as its treasurer and secretary pro tempore. He was also a charter member of the Kentucky Society for the Promotion of Useful Knowledge in 1787. In August 1799, he represented Mercer County at Kentucky's second constitutional convention.

Allin was the surveyor for the Transylvania Company, and laying out the site of the city of Henderson, Kentucky, in 1797. He also helped lay out the town of Harrodsburg, Kentucky, and served as clerk of its board of trustees from March 24, 1786, to May 4, 1816. In 1811, he was elected surveyor for the town of Danville. In addition to surveying, he operated a farm, a mill, and a distillery.

Allin resigned as circuit court clerk in 1825 and as county clerk in 1831. His son, Ben, succeeded him in the former office, and his son, Thomas Jr., succeeded him in the latter. He died of cholera on June 26, 1833, and was buried in Springhill Cemetery in Harrodsburg.
