= Atlantis Plastics =

American plastics manufacturer, 1984–2019

Atlantis Plastics, Inc.
- Company type: Public
- Traded as: Expert Market: ATPL
- Industry: Plastics manufacturing
- Founded: 1984; 42 years ago, in Atlanta, Georgia
- Founder: Earl W Powell
- Defunct: October 17, 2019
- Fate: Bankrupted. Molding division sold to Custom Plastics LLC, plastic films division sold to AEP Industries LLC.
- Headquarters: Atlanta, Georgia
- Key people: Bud Philbrook (CEO)
- Number of employees: 1,381

Atlantis Plastics, Inc. was an American company which manufactured specialty polyethylene films and molded and extruded plastic components used in a variety of industrial and consumer applications. It had 1,381 employees as of December 31, 2006.

== History ==
Atlantis was founded in 1984 as a holding company, initially with interests in the insurance and furniture industries. From 1986 to 1994 it acquired various plastics industry holdings. In 1987 it was acquired by the equity firm Trivest, which soon spun Atlantis off as a public company but retained an ownership stake. Atlantis is headquartered in Atlanta, Georgia and has facilities in fifteen locations within ten U.S. states (Arkansas, California, Georgia, Indiana, Kentucky, Michigan, Minnesota, Oklahoma, Tennessee, and Texas). Atlantis has three business segments: Plastic Films for wrapping pallets of materials, Injection Molding for parts used in products such as appliances and recreational vehicles and Plastics Extrusion used in products such as residential siding. The corporation earned $43.6 million in 2005 and $29.0 million in 2006, on sales of $424.3 and $418.7 million, respectively. The downturn was attributed to the slump in the housing sector.

In 2008, Atlantis Plastics agreed to delist from NASDAQ and move to Pink Sheets following disclosure that the company was not in compliance with the minimum bid price requirement.

On August 10, 2008 Atlantis Plastics filed for Chapter 11 bankruptcy protection and agreed to sell its plastic films division to AEP Industries Inc., which was acquired by Berry Global in August 2016, and its molded plastics products division to Custom Plastic Solutions LLC, an affiliate of private equity fund Monomoy Capital Partners LP.

On December 18, 2008 the bankruptcy court case was converted to a chapter 7 bankruptcy. On October 17, 2019 the liquidation was finalized and the company dissolved.

== June 2008 shooting ==
On June 25, 2008 at the 160-employee injection molding manufacturing facility in Henderson, Kentucky, six co-workers were killed and another was injured in a workplace shooting. Among the dead was the gunman, 25-year-old Wesley Neal Higdon, who retrieved the handgun from his truck after getting into a dispute with a co-worker and being told to go home by supervisor. Higdon fatally shot the supervisor and opened fire in the break room. He ended the shooting by killing himself with the same handgun.
