= Little Dixie, Kentucky =

Unincorporated community in Kentucky, United States

- Unincorporated community
- Location within Kentucky
- Coordinates: 37°27′41″N 82°33′34″W
- Country: United States
- State: Kentucky
- County: Pike
- Elevation: 761 ft (232 m)
- Time zone: UTC-5 (Eastern (EST))
  - Summer (DST): UTC-4 (EDT)
- Area code: 606
- GNIS feature ID: 509806

Little Dixie (also Little Dixi) is an unincorporated community in Pike County, Kentucky, United States.
