= Henderson, Kentucky =

City in Kentucky, United States

- City
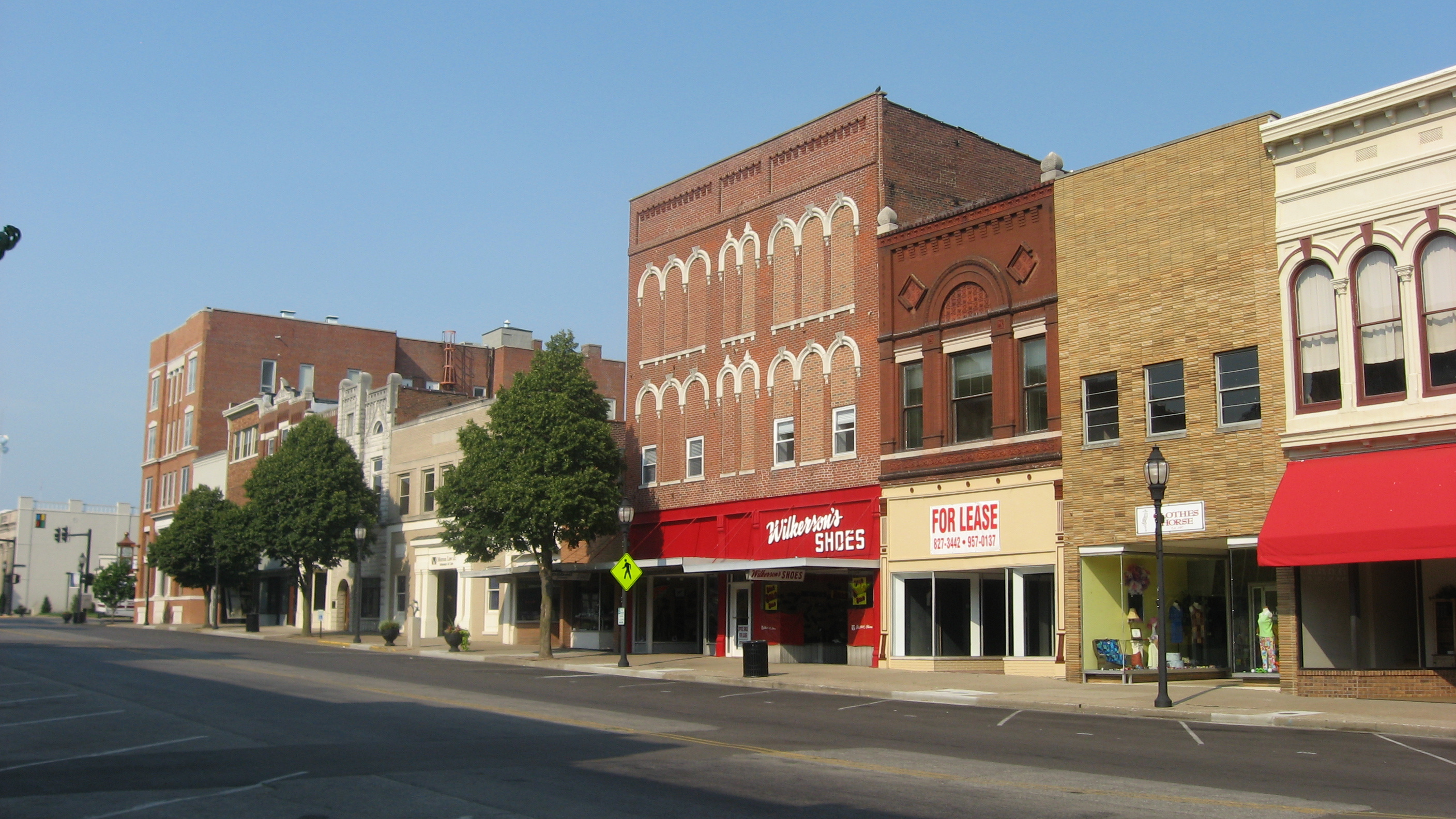
- North Main Street

- Flag

- Location of Henderson in Henderson County, Kentucky.
- Coordinates: 37°50′8″N 87°34′51″W
- Country: United States
- State: Kentucky
- County: Henderson
- Established: 1797
- Incorporated: 1840
- Named for: land speculator Richard Henderson

Government
  - Mayor: Brad Staton

Area
  - Total: 18.39 sq mi (47.63 km^{2})
  - Land: 16.11 sq mi (41.73 km^{2})
  - Water: 2.28 sq mi (5.90 km^{2}) 13.01%
- Elevation: 407 ft (124 m)

Population (2020)
  - Total: 27,981
  - Estimate (2022): 27,697
  - Density: 1,736.6/sq mi (670.51/km^{2})
- Time zone: UTC−6 (CST)
  - Summer (DST): UTC−5 (CDT)
- ZIP Codes: 42420, 42419
- Area codes: 270 & 364
- FIPS code: 21-35866
- GNIS feature ID: 0494023
- Website: www.hendersonky.gov

Henderson is a city in Kentucky, United States. Located on the Ohio River, Henderson is the county seat of Henderson County, Kentucky. The population was 29,781 at the 2020 U.S. census. It is part of the Evansville–Henderson, Indiana–Kentucky Combined Statistical Area, locally known as the "Tri-State Area," and is considered the southernmost suburb of Evansville, Indiana. Henderson is a home-rule class city under Kentucky law.

== History ==
=== Early settlements ===
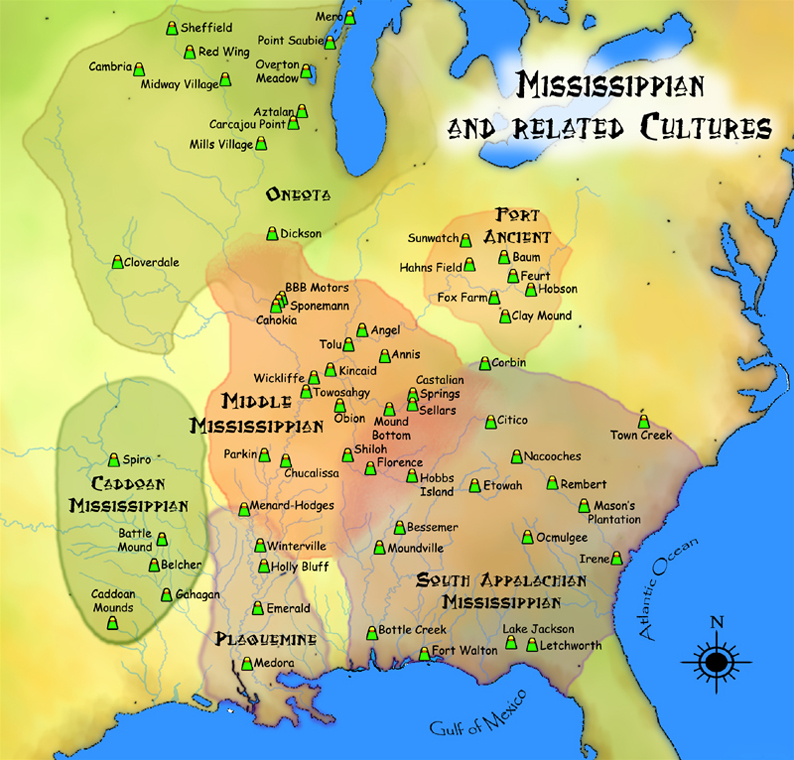
Approximate areas of various Mississippian and related cultures

Archaeological research shows that people were living in what is now Kentucky by at least 9,500 BCE, although they may have arrived much earlier.

The settlers of the area after the start of the 1st millennium CE were of the Mississippian culture, a Native American civilization that flourished throughout what is now the Midwestern, Eastern, and Southeastern United States, from approximately 800 CE to 1600 CE. The population of most settlements of this culture had dispersed or were experiencing severe social and environmental stress by 1500.

The area that is now Henderson County was later inhabited by the Yuchi, Shawnee and the Eastern Band of Cherokee Indians. Significant artifacts from these tribes and earlier peoples, including from mounds, have been found by white settlers and their descendants since the 1700s.

=== 18th century ===
Henderson has its roots in a small, block-wide strip of land high above the Ohio River, the site of the present-day Audubon Mill Park directly south of the city's riverfront boat dock. A village on this site was called "Red Banks" because of the reddish clay soil of the bluffs overlooking the Ohio River. The future city was named after Richard Henderson, an eighteenth-century pioneer and land speculator, by his associates Samuel Hopkins and Thomas Allin. Henderson County also shares this namesake. On March 17, 1775, North Carolina judge Richard Henderson and his Transylvania Company had met with 1,200 Cherokee in a council at Sycamore Shoals (present-day Elizabethton, Tennessee) to purchase over 17,000,000 acres (69,000 km^{2}) of land between the Ohio, Cumberland, and Kentucky rivers in present-day Kentucky and Tennessee to resell it to white settlers. Known as the Transylvania Purchase, the sale was voided by the Virginia General Assembly, since the territory (and the sole right to purchase land from Indians within its bounds) was part of Virginia's royal charter. However, the commonwealth granted Henderson and his company an area of 200,000 acres (810 km^{2}) to develop. It was located at the confluence of the Green and Ohio rivers. Henderson hired Daniel Boone to survey the country and select favorable sites, but Henderson died before the town was developed.

By the early 1790s, Red Banks had a tavern and several European-American families co-existing with the local Cherokee. On November 16, 1792, resident Robert Simpson wrote to Alexander D. Orr in Lexington, requesting help to appoint a magistrate for Red Banks to deal with some of its 30 families he felt were of dubious (criminal) character. During this period, the Red Banks settlement had gained notoriety as a frontier haven for westward-moving outlaws and their families. One such family was that of Squire Samuel Mason who briefly ran a river pirate gang at nearby Diamond Island. By that time, excluding the Cherokee, the free male inhabitants of Red Bank totaled 62. Later, in 1797, Captain Young of Mercer County, Kentucky and the "Exterminators", a group of regulators under his leadership swiftly and violently drove out the remaining outlaw element in Red Banks.

Samuel Hopkins and the surveyor Thomas Allin visited Red Banks in 1797 and laid out plans for the future town of Henderson. It was formally established by the Kentucky legislature the same year. A distinguishing characteristic of the new town plan was unusually wide streets, reportedly to prevent a fire in one block from easily spreading to another. Even with diagonal parking spaces outlined on downtown streets today, the streets are wide enough to include two-way traffic and space left over for delivery trucks to park in the center of the streets without interfering. By October 29, 1799, a census for the city of Henderson showed a population of 183. The county had 423 residents, 207 slaves, and 412 horses.

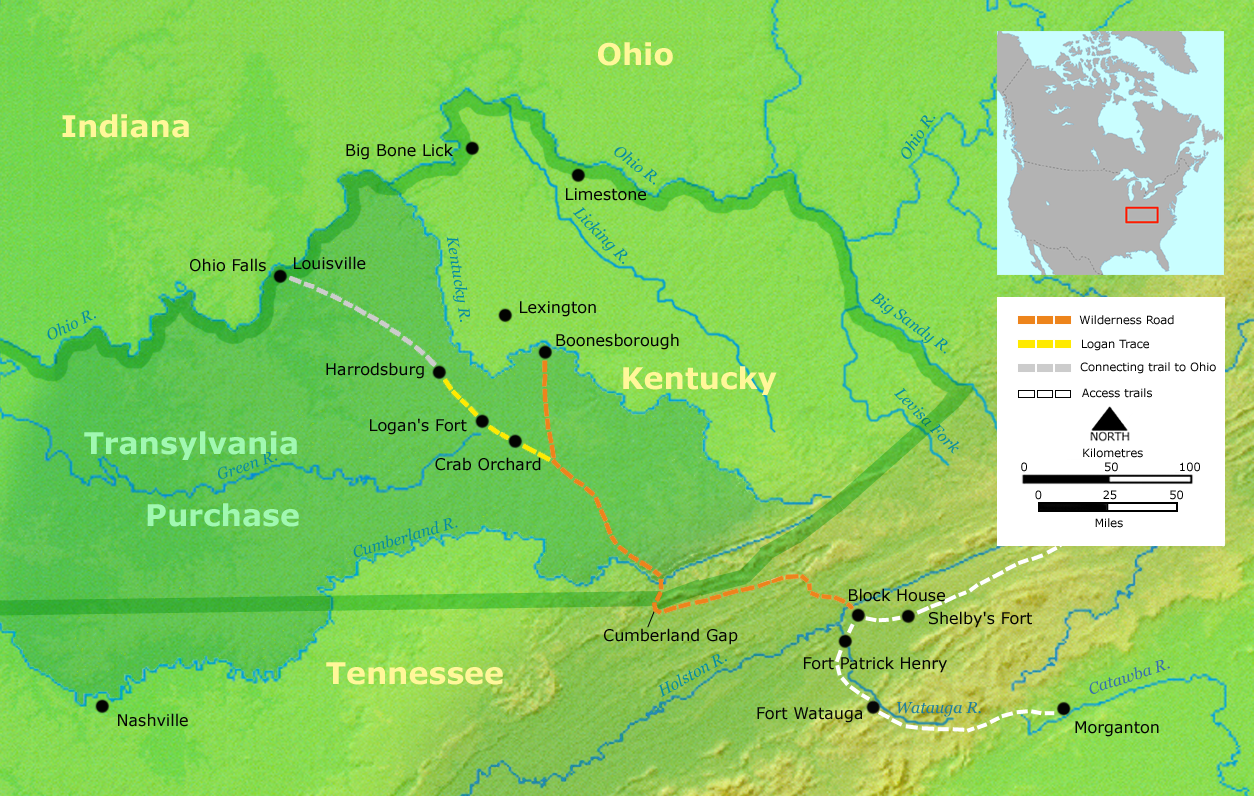
The Transylvania Purchase at Sycamore Shoals in Elizabethton, Tennessee, and the Wilderness Road into Kentucky

=== 19th century ===
A post office was established in the town in 1801; the city was formally incorporated on January 21, 1840.

By mid-century, Henderson County had become a major producer of tobacco, much of which was exported to Great Britain. The area was reported to be the largest dark tobacco producer in the world; large tobacco warehouses and stemmeries dotted the downtown Henderson area. Postcards from the era show long lines of horse- and mule-drawn wagons piled high with tobacco, waiting their turn to unload for shipment downriver. Some tobacco processors accumulated considerable fortunes.

=== 20th century ===
Shortly before World War I, Henderson was said to have more millionaires per capita than any other city in the world. Great Britain, however, imposed a high tariff on imported tobacco after the war, wrecking the county and city's export market. Tobacco warehouses and plants closed, and the community's economic fortunes reversed. The last tobacco facility, the Soaper Tobacco Warehouse on Pennell Street, closed in 1984.

Henderson continued as a regional center into the 20th century. Businesses were concentrated in the downtown area. In the early 20th century, recognizable neighborhoods (unincorporated places) within the city and the outlying edges of town included Audubon, Weaverton, and Audubon Heights. Segments of Audubon and Weaverton were sometimes referred to as the "East End", which held the second-largest business area after downtown Henderson.

=== 21st century ===
A workplace shooting occurred at an Atlantis Plastics factory in Henderson on June 25, 2008. The gunman, 25-year-old Wesley Neal Higdon, shot and killed five people and critically injured a sixth person before taking his own life. The shooting is the worst in the history of Henderson County in terms of casualties, surpassing triple homicides occurring in 1799 and 1955.

== Geography ==
Henderson is located in north-central Henderson County, 10 miles (16 km) south of Evansville, Indiana, and 30 miles (48 km) west of Owensboro, Kentucky. According to the United States Census Bureau, Henderson has a total area of 17.6 square miles (45.6 km^{2}), of which 15.3 square miles (39.6 km^{2}) are land and 2.3 square miles (5.9 km^{2}), or 13.01%, are water. As the state line tends to follow the Indiana side of the river, most of the Ohio River going past Henderson is within the city limits.

Because the Indiana-Kentucky border is defined as the low-water mark on the north bank of the Ohio River as of 1792, and because the river changed course as a result of the New Madrid earthquake of 1812, a small portion of Henderson County (approximately 4 miles (6 km) long and 1 mile (1.6 km) wide), lies north of the current course of the river in what would appear to be part of Indiana. Both the Bi-State Vietnam Gold Star Bridges and the Ellis Park Race Course horse racing track are located entirely within Kentucky. The racetrack uses Indiana's 812 area code despite officially being located in Kentucky.

=== Natural disasters ===
Henderson had unusual weather patterns in the late 1800s and early 1900s. The "great sleet" of 1901 fell for three weeks in February. "Horses had to have special shoes to keep their footing on local roads."

In 1908 the Henderson area had high temperatures and a drought, which markedly reduced the flow of the Ohio River. The Henderson Daily Gleaner reported that "boys were playing baseball every day in the middle of the old riverbed." All businesses were challenged and forced to close. A Henderson reporter wrote, "[I]t is almost hazardous for even small gasoline boats to run".

On June 20, 1914, Henderson was hit by a "baby cyclone". Jack Hudgions, local historian and newsman, wrote that "hail as large as partridge eggs" fell for ten minutes and that powerful winds uprooted giant trees "and twisted limbs from shade trees in the city." In the northern part of Henderson, several buildings were blown down and wheat stocks were scattered. The storm lasted for more than 30 minutes, laying crops low throughout the county. Telephone lines were damaged and windows broken in the city and county by the hailstones. 26 days later, the city was hit by a tornado that left two dead and much of the city in ruins.

In 1937, 21 inches (530 mm) of precipitation fell in 18 days over the Ohio River watershed, resulting in the Ohio River flood of 1937 and extensive damage. Henderson, on its bluff, was spared much of the damage that Pittsburgh, Cincinnati, Louisville, Evansville, Paducah and other river cities suffered. Leigh Harris, the publisher of the Henderson Gleaner and Evening Journal newspapers, wrote, "Henderson is on the river but never in it!" Its favorable location helped the city attract new industries.

=== Climate ===
The climate in this area is characterized by hot, humid summers and generally mild to cool winters. According to the Köppen Climate Classification system, Henderson has a humid subtropical climate, abbreviated "Cfa" on climate maps.

== Demographics ==
Historical population
Census	Pop.	Note	%±
1800	205		—
1810	159		−22.4%
1830	484		—
1850	1,775		—
1870	4,171		—
1880	5,365		28.6%
1890	8,835		64.7%
1900	10,272		16.3%
1910	11,452		11.5%
1920	12,169		6.3%
1930	11,668		−4.1%
1940	13,160		12.8%
1950	16,837		27.9%
1960	16,892		0.3%
1970	22,976		36.0%
1980	24,834		8.1%
1990	25,945		4.5%
2000	27,373		5.5%
2010	28,757		5.1%
2020	27,981		−2.7%
2025 (est.)	27,822		−0.6%
U.S. Decennial Census

=== 2020 census ===
As of the 2020 census, Henderson had a population of 27,981. The median age was 39.9 years. 22.8% of residents were under the age of 18 and 18.5% of residents were 65 years of age or older. For every 100 females there were 89.7 males, and for every 100 females age 18 and over there were 85.2 males age 18 and over.

99.4% of residents lived in urban areas, while 0.6% lived in rural areas.

There were 11,962 households in Henderson, of which 29.1% had children under the age of 18 living in them. Of all households, 35.8% were married-couple households, 19.7% were households with a male householder and no spouse or partner present, and 36.0% were households with a female householder and no spouse or partner present. About 35.8% of all households were made up of individuals and 15.2% had someone living alone who was 65 years of age or older.

There were 13,190 housing units, of which 9.3% were vacant. The homeowner vacancy rate was 2.3% and the rental vacancy rate was 9.6%.

Racial composition as of the 2020 census
Race	Number	Percent
White	21,864	78.1%
Black or African American	3,436	12.3%
American Indian and Alaska Native	71	0.3%
Asian	190	0.7%
Native Hawaiian and Other Pacific Islander	40	0.1%
Some other race	638	2.3%
Two or more races	1,742	6.2%
Hispanic or Latino (of any race)	1,142	4.1%

=== 2000 census ===
As of the 2000 census, there were 27,373 people, 11,693 households, and 7,389 families residing in the city. The population density was 1,829.0 inhabitants per square mile (706.2/km^{2}). There were 12,652 housing units at an average density of 845.4 per square mile (326.4/km^{2}). The racial makeup of the city was 84.1% White, 11.8% Black or African American, 0.18% Native American, 0.7% Asian, 0.01% Pacific Islander, 0.58% from other races, and 1.04% from two or more races. Hispanics or Latinos of any race were 1.27% of the population.

There were 11,693 households, out of which 29.8% had children under the age of 18 living with them, 45.5% were married couples living together, 14.1% had a female householder with no husband present, and 36.8% were non-families. 32.1% of all households were made up of individuals, and 12.9% had someone living alone who was 65 years of age or older. The average household size was 2.27 and the average family size was 2.86.

The age distribution was 23.5% under the age of 18, 9.2% from 18 to 24, 29.5% from 25 to 44, 22.5% from 45 to 64, and 15.3% who were 65 years of age or older. The median age was 37 years. For every 100 females, there were 89.3 males. For every 100 females age 18 and over, there were 85.3 males.

The median income for a household in the city was $30,427, and the median income for a family was $39,887. Males had a median income of $32,131 versus $22,225 for females. The per capita income for the city was $17,925. About 13.2% of families and 16.5% of the population were below the poverty line, including 24.6% of those under age 18 and 11.3% of those age 65 or over.

== Economy ==
The county has numerous industries, including aluminum production, automotive and appliance parts, plastic injection molding, tool and die making, food processing and processing of recycled materials. In June 2008, of the 20,205 jobs in Henderson, almost 12% were government jobs. It also ranks as one of Kentucky's top three corn and soybean producers. Henderson County is also one of the state's leading coal producers, with over 2.8 million tons produced in 2004.

== Arts and culture ==
=== Annual festivals ===
Each year Henderson hosts a variety of events and festivals. The Henderson Breakfast Lions Club holds the Tri-Fest, a street festival that raises funds for non-profit organizations, in mid-April each year. There is also the free Handy Blues and Barbecue Festival in mid-June, honoring the legacy of Father of the Blues W. C. Handy, and the Bluegrass in the Park Folklife Festival in August. Annual barbecues have been a Henderson tradition dating as far back as the one started on Sunday, July 18, 1926, in Atkinson Park by the Henderson Freight Station employees. Notable foods were lamb, burgoo, etc.

Bluegrass in the Park Folklife Festival is one of the largest free Bluegrass festivals in the country. It is Henderson's oldest on-going music festival and marked its 25th continuous year in 2010. Past performers have included Bill Monroe, Emmylou Harris, Alison Krauss and Union Station, Ricky Skaggs, John Hartford, Glen Campbell, and other notable Bluegrass artists. The Folklife aspect of the festival is a celebration of local lifestyles and culture with displays on recreational folklife (traditional games), functional folklife (quilting, tatting, chair-caning, basket-making, fly-tying), oral traditions (storytelling), folk music, food traditions (curing country hams, making burgoo, the craft of barbecue), and foreign cultures that have integrated with local traditions, among other things.

The Henderson Lions Club Arts and Crafts Festival is a large event that sees as many as 10,000 visitors each year. The Festival, originally known as the Big Rivers Arts Festival and then later taken over and known as the Green River Areas Development District Arts Festival, has been held since the 1970s and is on the first weekend in October at John James Audubon State Park and has been organized by the Henderson City Lions Club since 2018.

=== Points of interest ===
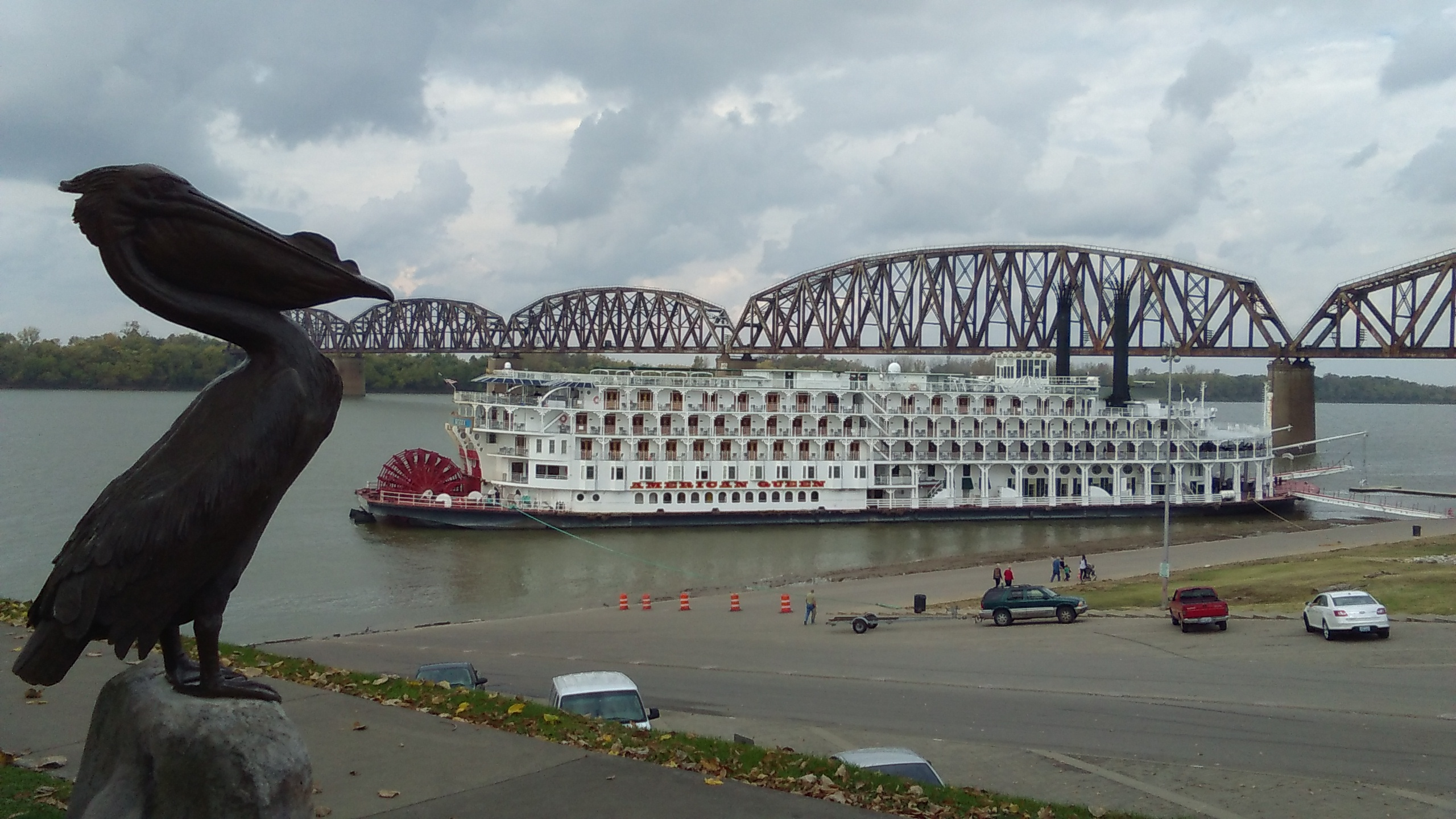
American Queen steamboat docked at Henderson riverfront

- John James Audubon State Park – John James Audubon spent several years in Henderson in the 1810s. He had a store with his partner Ferdinand Rozier before deciding to work at art full-time. He is honored in the downtown with nine cast-bronze sculptures based on paintings from his Birds of America series, at the Park's museum. It houses the world's largest collection of Audubon memorabilia and a collections of his work.
- River Front – The city's downtown and river front features a play area and water park, trails and benches, and boat docks.
- Metzger's Tavern is the oldest continuously operating tavern in Kentucky, founded in 1887.

==== Film locations ====
Some scenes from A League of Their Own, directed by Penny Marshall, were filmed in Henderson in 1991, including all of the scenes in and around the house where the team was living; it is located on Main Street in Henderson.

The horse betting scene in Traveller starring Bill Paxton, Mark Wahlberg and Julianna Margulies was filmed at Ellis Park in 1995.

== Education ==
The Henderson County school system includes eight elementary schools: A.B. Chandler, Spottsville, East Heights, Bend Gate, South Heights, Jefferson, Cairo, and Niagara; two middle schools, North Middle and South Middle; and one high school, Henderson County High School. The Thelma B. Johnson Early Learning Center serves pre-schoolers. There is an alternative school for those suspended from the other schools in the district, Central Academy. There is one parochial school, Holy Name of Jesus Catholic School which has both elementary and middle school. and also a school for students with mental or physical deficiencies, Riverview School.

Henderson is home to one postsecondary institution, Henderson Community College, as well as a satellite campus of Murray State University. In addition, students are served by Oakland City University Evansville Center, the University of Evansville, and the University of Southern Indiana in Evansville.

Henderson has a lending library, the Henderson County Public Library.

== Media ==
Henderson is served by one local daily newspaper, The Henderson Gleaner, as well as the metro edition of the Evansville Courier & Press.

Henderson is part of the Evansville media market, the 101st-largest television market and 161st-largest radio market in the United States. WSON (860-AM) is the only locally owned radio station broadcasting from the city.

== Infrastructure ==
=== Transportation ===
The Henderson Area Rapid Transit (HART) was created in 1957 as a publicly owned mass transit system, of which all citizens who live in the city of Henderson are part owners.

- I-69 in Kentucky has its northern terminus at the US 41/US 60 interchange, but is planned to be extended to Indiana via the I-69 Ohio River Crossing.
- US 41's Bi-State Vietnam Gold Star Bridges connects the city with Evansville to the north and, to the south, the cities of Madisonville and Hopkinsville.

== Notable people ==
=== Art and culture ===
- Young Ewing Allison, writer, editor and publisher
- John J. Becker, composer
- Ingram Crockett, poet and journalist
- Teddy Darby, blues musician
- Hadley Duvall, reproductive freedom advocate
- Ewing Galloway, journalist and county prosecutor
- Joey Goebel, author
- Gregg Hale, film producer, The Blair Witch Project
- W. C. Handy, African-American blues legend, (spent about a decade in Henderson)
- Rosa Henderson, American jazz and blues singer
- Kristen Johnson, former Miss Kentucky USA
- Grandpa Jones, Louis Marshall "Grandpa" Jones, banjo player, comedian, born in Henderson County
- Kenneth "Kenny" Meeks, bassist, guitarist, vocalist and singer/songwriter.

=== Military ===
- Adam Johnson, Confederate brigadier general in the Civil War
- Rear Admiral Husband E. Kimmel, commander of the U.S. Pacific Fleet during the Japanese attack on Pearl Harbor
- Command Sergeant Major Gary L. Littrell, Medal of Honor recipient for his service during the Vietnam War
- Corporal Luther Skaggs Jr., Medal of Honor recipient for his service with the Marine Corps in the Pacific Theater of WWII

=== Business ===
- Amos G. Rhodes, Atlanta furniture magnate and namesake of Rhodes Hall
- Don Ball, philanthropist, businessman, and founder of Ball Homes

=== Government and politics ===
- John Young Brown, U.S. congressman, governor of Kentucky
- Albert Benjamin "Happy" Chandler, U.S. senator, governor of Kentucky, commissioner of Major League Baseball
- James Franklin Clay, U.S. congressman
- John Lloyd Dorsey Jr., U.S. congressman
- Samuel Mason, early settler, justice of the peace, soldier, and river pirate
- Carl D. Melton, Kentucky state representative and judge
- Lazarus Powell, former governor of Kentucky
- Ann Rutledge, first love of Abraham Lincoln; was born just outside Henderson
- Augustus Owsley Stanley, Governor of Kentucky

=== Science and research ===
- John James Audubon, ornithologist (spent several years in Henderson in the 1810s)
- Darrell A. Posey, anthropologist, ethnobiologist

=== Sports ===
- Clarence Adams, pro boxer
- Sam Ball, former NFL player
- Stephen Bardo, former NBA player
- Junius Bibbs, winner of three Negro leagues championships as a member of the Kansas City Monarchs, born in Henderson
- Christian Jolly, North American contract bridge champion

== See also ==
- Bi-State Vietnam Gold Star Bridges
- Cities and towns along the Ohio River
- John James Audubon State Park and Museum
- Southern Cherokee Nation of Kentucky
