= Mud Center, Indiana =

- Unincorporated community
- Location within Indiana Location within the United States
- Coordinates: 37°57′21″N 87°37′43″W
- Country: United States
- State: Indiana
- County: Vanderburgh
- Township: Perry
- Elevation: 381 ft (116 m)
- Time zone: UTC-6 (Central (CST))
  - Summer (DST): UTC-5 (CDT)
- ZIP code: 47712
- Area codes: 812, 930
- GNIS feature ID: 439796

Mud Center is an unincorporated community on the west edge of Evansville in Perry Township, Vanderburgh County, in the U.S. state of Indiana. Mud Center is said to be part of the nearby community of Red Bank, even though it is a completely separate community. It is bordered on the east by Carpenter Creek and on the north by Broadway Avenue.

The name is derived from the local streets of the community long being unimproved, and becoming a muddy mess every time it rained.

A 1987 Evansville Press column reported that Mud Center was "alive and well," following a prior column where the writer opined that the community no longer existed, and then reporting that at least two generations in the neighborhood had used the name and descendants of the earlier residents still did.
