= Alabama v. Georgia =

- Supreme Court of the United States

Original jurisdiction Decided May 1, 1860
- Full case name: State of Alabama v. State of Georgia
- Citations: 64 U.S. 505 (more) 23 How. 505; 16 L. Ed. 556

Outcome
- The true border between the states of Alabama and Georgia is the average water mark on the western bank of the Chattahoochee River

Court membership
- Chief Justice Roger B. Taney Associate Justices John McLean · James M. Wayne; John Catron · Peter V. Daniel; Samuel Nelson · Robert C. Grier; John A. Campbell · Nathan Clifford

Case opinion
- Majority: Wayne, joined by unanimous court

State of Alabama v. State of Georgia, 64 U.S. (23 How.) 505 (1860), is a unanimous ruling by the Supreme Court of the United States which held that the true border between the states of Alabama and Georgia was the average water mark on the western bank of the Chattahoochee River. In coming to its conclusion, the Court defined what constituted the bed and bank of a river. The case has had international repercussions as well. The Supreme Court's definition was adopted by courts in the United Kingdom in the case Hindson v. Ashby (1896) 65 LJ Ch. 515, 2 Ch. 27.

== Background ==
In 1629, during European colonization of the Americas, King Charles I granted Sir Robert Heath a charter giving him title to Native American-occupied land from the northern boundary of what is modern-day Florida north to Albemarle Sound (31st latitude), extending from the Atlantic Ocean west to the Pacific Ocean. In 1663, Charles II of England revoked the Heath charter and issued a new charter to eight noblemen (the "Lords and Proprietors"). In 1665, this charter was amended to extend the land grant northward roughly to the current border of North Carolina and Virginia. In 1729, the Proprietors were forced to turn their charters over to George II of Great Britain, and North Carolina separated from South Carolina.

In 1732, George II granted James Oglethorpe and other settlers a charter to all South Carolina Colony land west of the Savannah River. However, the charter was unclear as to whether the new colony covered all of South Carolina's western border, and South Carolina continued to dispute Georgia's claim over a strip of land about 12 miles (19 km) wide. In order to help secure ratification of the Articles of Confederation, the new United States Congress passed legislation encouraging all states to give up their western claims so that new territories might be formed and transformed into states which might eventually be admitted to the union. In August 1787, South Carolina ceded the disputed strip of land to the state of Georgia.

In the Compact of 1802, Georgia ceded its sparsely settled western lands beyond the Chattahoochee River to the United States in exchange for a guarantee that the federal government would extinguish all Native American claims to land within the state's borders. The United States made good on its promise, removing the Cherokee nation to reservations in the new Mississippi Territory (a process which would not end until the completion of the Trail of Tears forcible removals in 1838). The Compact of 1802 specified that Georgia's western boundary would be as follows:

West of a line beginning on the western bank of the Chattahoochee River where the same crosses the boundary between the United States and Spain, running up the said river and along the western bank thereof.

In 1817, what is now the modern state of Mississippi was created from the western half of the Mississippi Territory, the remaining territory renamed the Alabama Territory. The territory became the modern state of Alabama in 1819.

The state of Alabama entered into a dispute with the state of Georgia over the specific meaning of the Compact of 1802. Alabama argued that the contour of the land on the western bank of the Chattahoochee River was sometimes high bluffs and sometimes low, flat floodplains, and that the high-water mark sometimes marched as much as a half-mile inland to the west. Georgia answered that it did indeed claim these lands as its own, and that the Compact of 1802 did not cover the northernmost part of the border (which Georgia claimed it had obtained directly from the state of South Carolina in 1787 without first transferring title to the United States).

The State of Alabama submitted its case to the Supreme Court in December 1855. The State of Georgia submitted its reply in December 1858.

== Decision ==
Associate Justice James Moore Wayne delivered the unanimous opinion of the court.

Justice Wayne emphasized the mutual nature of the Compact of 1802, and pointed out that Georgia admitted in the agreement that its western boundary extended north to the border with the state of Tennessee. This, then, made any argument over the South Carolina cession of 1787 moot.

Next, Justice Wayne argued that "The contract of cession must be interpreted by the words of it, according to their received meaning and use in the language in which it is written, as that can be collected from judicial opinions concerning the rights of private persons upon rivers, and the writings of publicists in reference to the settlement of controversies between nations and States as to their ownership and jurisdiction on the soil of rivers within their banks and beds." Citing scholarly sources from Europe, American case law (such as Handly's Lessee v. Anthony, 18 U. S. 374 (1820)), and other cessions between states and the United States, Justice Wayne concluded that the Compact of 1802 did not mean the low-water mark as claimed by Alabama.

However, Wayne concluded that this did not necessarily mean the high-water mark, as claimed by Georgia. Rather, the Compact of 1802 specified the western bank, and the bank was different from the high-water mark. Drawing on the sources cited, Wayne defined the bank as follows (emphasis in original):

the bed of the river is that portion of its soil which is alternately covered and left bare as there may be an increase or diminution in the supply of water, and which is adequate to contain it at its average and mean stage during the entire year, without reference to the extraordinary freshets of the winter or spring or the extreme droughts of the summer or autumn.

The majority concluded, therefore, that only the average water level defined the bank, and that the boundary of Georgia should be so marked. The Court also reaffirmed that the Compact of 1802 gave both states free navigation of the river.

== Bibliography ==
- Channing, Edward. A Students' History of the United States. New York: Macmillan Co., 1898.
- Chiorazzi, Michael and Most, Marguerite. Prestatehood Legal Materials: A Fifty-State Research Guide, Including New York City and the District of Columbia. Florence, Ky.: Routledge, 2006.
- Kalinoe, Lawrence Kuna. Water Law and Customary Water Rights in Papua New Guinea. Papua New Guinea: Law Faculty Publication Unit, 1999.
- Lalor, John J. "Territories." In Cyclopædia of Political Science, Political Economy, and of the Political History of the United States. Chicago, A.H. Andrews & Co., 1886.
- Sturgis, Amy H. Presidents From Washington Through Monroe: 1789–1825: Debating the Issues in Pro and Con Primary Documents. Westport, Conn.: Greenwood Press, 2002.
- Wisdom, A.S. The Law of Rivers and Watercourses. London: Shaw, 1962.
