= Pigeon Township, Vanderburgh County, Indiana =

Pigeon Township
- Township
- Location in Vanderburgh County
- Coordinates: 37°58′27″N 87°34′10″W
- Country: United States
- State: Indiana
- County: Vanderburgh

Government
  - Type: Indiana township

Area
  - Total: 11.03 sq mi (28.6 km^{2})
  - Land: 10.86 sq mi (28.1 km^{2})
  - Water: 0.17 sq mi (0.44 km^{2}) 1.54%
- Elevation: 384 ft (117 m)

Population (2020)
  - Total: 27,415
  - Density: 2,745/sq mi (1,060/km^{2})
- ZIP codes: 42420, 47708, 47710, 47711, 47712, 47713, 47714, 47720
- GNIS feature ID: 453732
- Website: pigeontownship.org

Pigeon Township is one of eight townships in Vanderburgh County, Indiana, United States. As of the 2010 census, its population was 29,799 and it contained 15,434 housing units. At just over 11 square miles and having just under 30,000 people, Pigeon Township is both the smallest and most densely populated township in both Vanderburgh County as well as in Southwestern Indiana as a whole. Downtown Evansville and several historical districts are located entirely within the township as it contains the oldest sections of the city.

Pigeon Township was established in 1818.

== Geography ==
According to the 2010 census, the township has a total area of 11.03 square miles (28.6 km^{2}), of which 10.86 square miles (28.1 km^{2}) (or 98.46%) is land and 0.17 square miles (0.44 km^{2}) (or 1.54%) is water.

=== Cities, towns, villages ===
- Evansville (south-central portion)

=== Adjacent townships ===
- Indiana
  - Vanderburgh County
    - Center Township (northeast)
    - Knight Township (east)
    - Perry Township (west)

=== Airports and landing strips ===
- Deaconess Hospital Airport
- Welborn Memorial Baptist Hospital Airport

=== Rivers ===
- Pigeon Creek

== School districts ==
- Evansville-Vanderburgh School Corporation

== Political districts ==
- Indiana's 8th congressional district
- State House District 75
- State House District 76
- State House District 77
- State Senate District 49
