= Armstrong, Indiana =

- Unincorporated community
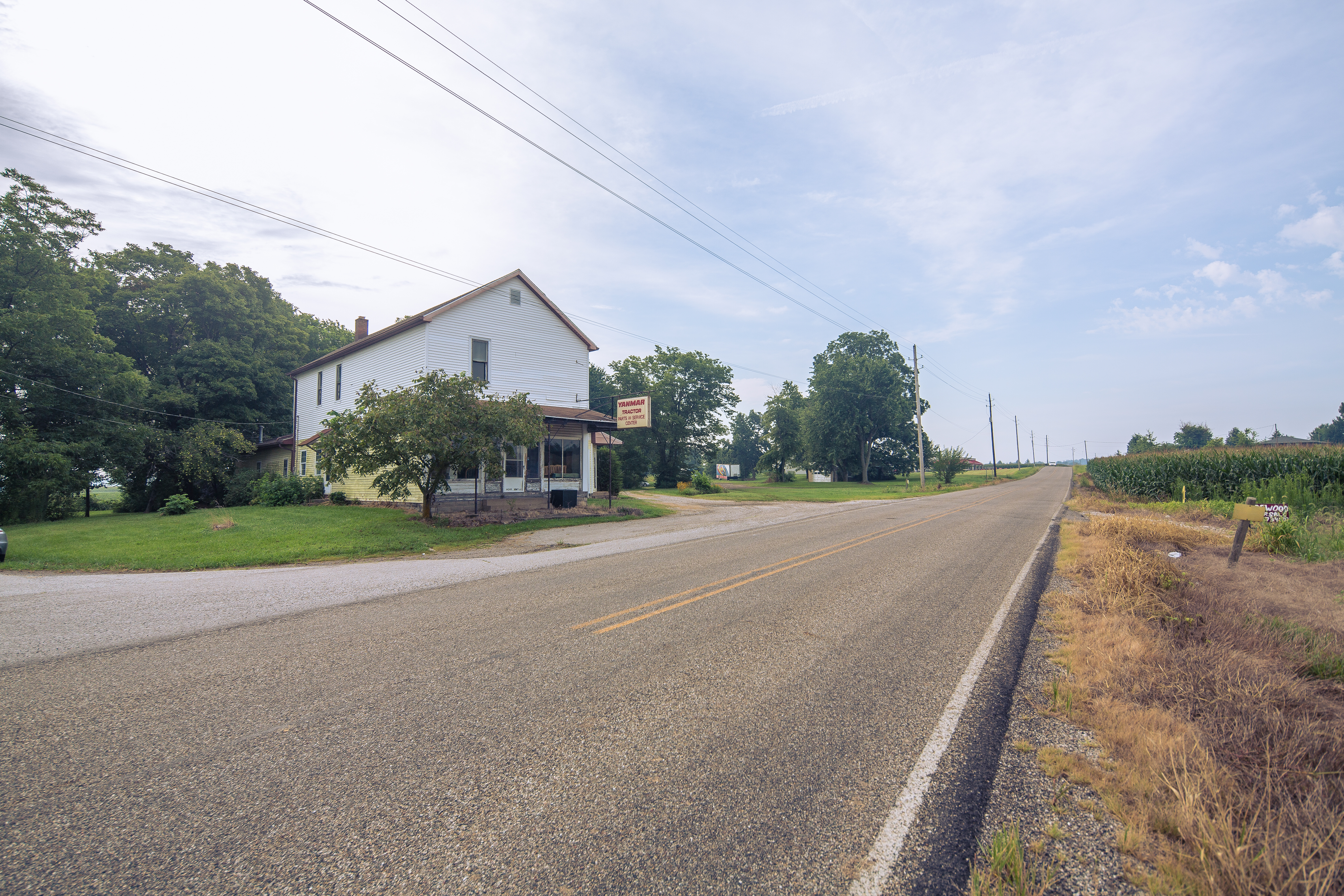

- Location within Indiana Location within the United States
- Coordinates: 38°06′33″N 87°38′50″W
- Country: United States
- State: Indiana
- County: Vanderburgh
- Township: Armstrong
- Elevation: 469 ft (143 m)
- Time zone: UTC-6 (Central (CST))
  - Summer (DST): UTC-5 (CDT)
- ZIP code: 47720
- Area codes: 812, 930
- GNIS feature ID: 430257

Armstrong is an unincorporated community in Armstrong Township, Vanderburgh County, in the U.S. state of Indiana.

== History ==
A post office was established at Armstrong in 1856, and remained in operation until it was discontinued in 1957.

== Geography ==
Armstrong is located on Indiana State Road 65 4 miles (6.4 km) west-northwest of Darmstadt.
