= Stringtown, Indiana =

Stringtown is the name of several unincorporated communities in Indiana:

- Stringtown, Boone County, Indiana
- Stringtown, Fountain County, Indiana
- Stringtown, Hancock County, Indiana
- Stringtown, Miami County, Indiana
- Stringtown, Ripley County, Indiana
- Stringtown, Vanderburgh County, Indiana
