= Knob Hill =

Knob Hill may refer to:

== Places ==
- Knob Hill, Colorado, a neighborhood of Colorado Springs, Colorado, U.S.
- Knob Hill, Indiana, an unincorporated community in the U.S.
- Knob Hill, Alberta, a locality in Wetaskiwin County, Alberta, Canada
- Knob Hill (Scarborough), a neighborhood in Scarborough, Toronto, Canada

== Mountains in the United States ==
- Knob Hill (Sweet Grass County), a mountain in Sweet Grass County, Montana
- Knob Hill (Kern County), a mountain near Halfway House, Kern County, California

== Other uses ==
- Knob Hill Farms, a defunct Canadian supermarket chain
- Knob Hill Stable, a Canadian racehorse operation

== See also ==
- Nob Hill (disambiguation)
