= Union Township, Vanderburgh County, Indiana =

Union Township Vanderburgh County
- Township
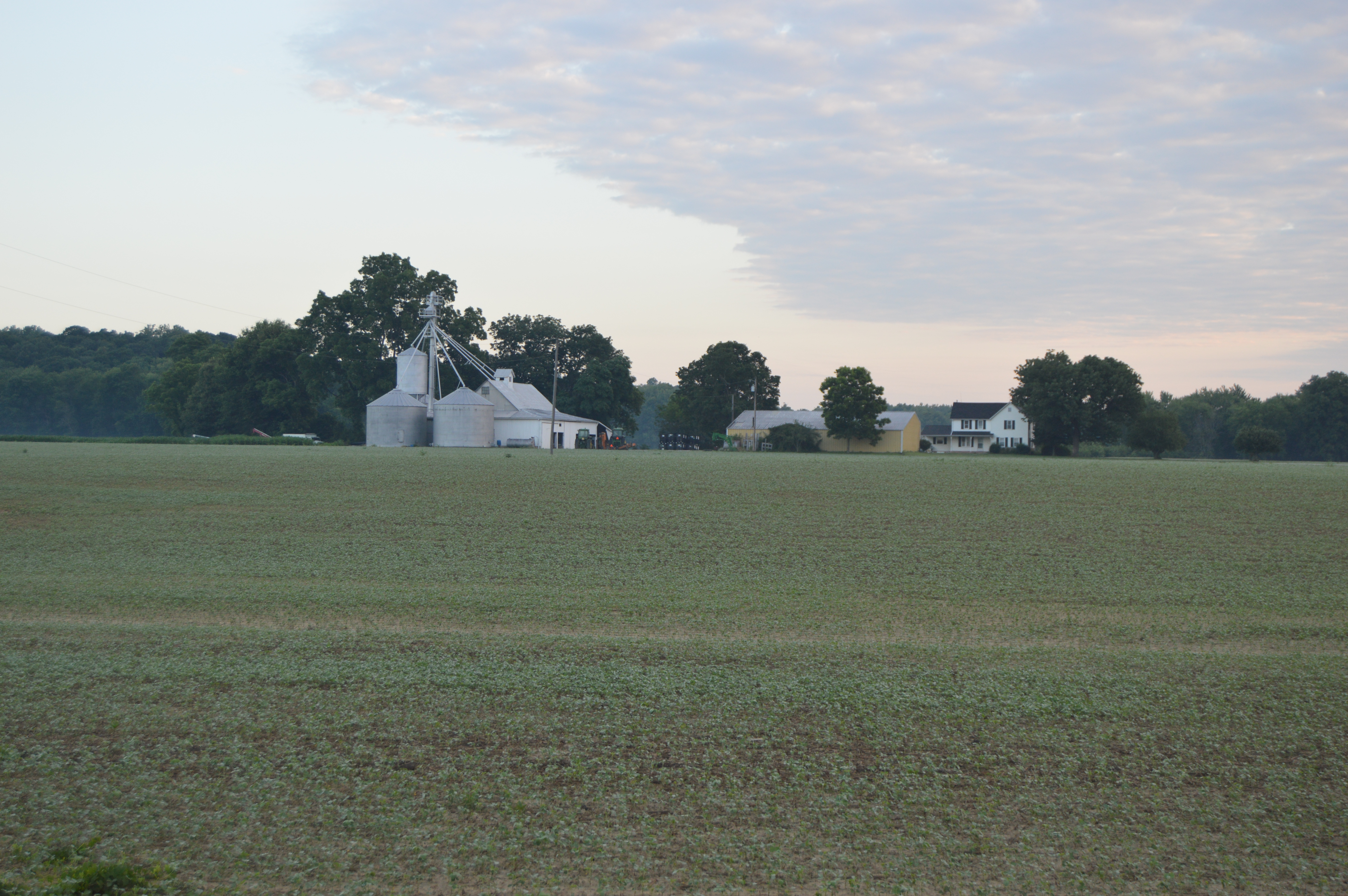
- Farm on Nurrenbern Road

- Location in Vanderburgh County
- Coordinates: 37°52′31″N 87°37′50″W
- Country: United States
- State: Indiana
- County: Vanderburgh

Government
  - Type: Indiana township

Area
  - Total: 28.09 sq mi (72.8 km^{2})
  - Land: 27.54 sq mi (71.3 km^{2})
  - Water: 0.55 sq mi (1.4 km^{2}) 1.96%
- Elevation: 360 ft (110 m)

Population (2020)
  - Total: 264
  - Density: 10.6/sq mi (4.1/km^{2})
- ZIP code: 47712
- GNIS feature ID: 453937

Union Township is the most sparsely populated of the eight townships in Vanderburgh County, Indiana, United States. As of the 2010 census, its population was 292 and it contained 227 housing units. This is largely due to the entire township being located within the Ohio River Floodplain.

== History ==
Union Township was organized in 1819. It was the subject of Handly's Lessee v. Anthony, a case before the United States Supreme Court regarding the border between Indiana and Kentucky.

== Geography ==
According to the 2010 census, the township has a total area of 28.09 square miles (72.8 km^{2}), of which 27.54 square miles (71.3 km^{2}) (or 98.04%) is land and 0.55 square miles (1.4 km^{2}) (or 1.96%) is water.

=== Unincorporated towns ===
- Cypress

=== Adjacent townships ===
- Perry Township (north)

=== Cemeteries ===
The township contains Stroud Cemetery.

=== Rivers ===
- Ohio River

== School districts ==
- Evansville-Vanderburgh School Corporation

== Political districts ==
- Indiana's 8th congressional district
- State House District 76
- State Senate District 49
