= Nob Hill (disambiguation) =

Nob Hill is a neighborhood in San Francisco, California, United States.

Nob Hill may also refer to:

- Nob Hill, Albuquerque, a neighborhood in Albuquerque, New Mexico, U.S.
- Nob Hill, Portland, Oregon, a neighborhood in Portland, Oregon, U.S.
- Nob Hill (Hong Kong), a private housing estate in Hong Kong
- Nob Hill (film), a 1945 musical drama
- Nob Hill Foods, a trading name for the Raley's Supermarkets chain in the western United States
- Nob Hill at Guantanamo Bay Naval Station, Cuba
- Nob Hill, the historical name for the neighborhood of the Cathedral Historic District (Sioux Falls, South Dakota)

== See also ==
- Knob Hill (disambiguation)
