= Daylight, Indiana =

- Unincorporated community
- Location within Indiana Location within the United States
- Coordinates: 38°05′37″N 87°29′26″W
- Country: United States
- State: Indiana
- County: Vanderburgh
- Township: Scott
- Elevation: 407 ft (124 m)
- Time zone: UTC-6 (Central (CST))
  - Summer (DST): UTC-5 (CDT)
- ZIP code: 47725
- Area codes: 812, 930
- GNIS feature ID: 433368

Daylight is an unincorporated community in Scott Township, Vanderburgh County, in the U.S. state of Indiana.

== History ==
A post office was established at Daylight in 1900, but was soon discontinued in 1903.
