= Armstrong Township, Vanderburgh County, Indiana =

Armstrong Township
- Township
- Location in Vanderburgh County
- Coordinates: 38°07′09″N 87°38′47″W
- Country: United States
- State: Indiana
- County: Vanderburgh

Government
  - Type: Indiana township

Area
  - Total: 29.52 sq mi (76.5 km^{2})
  - Land: 29.48 sq mi (76.4 km^{2})
  - Water: 0.04 sq mi (0.10 km^{2}) 0.14%
- Elevation: 446 ft (136 m)

Population (2020)
  - Total: 1,563
  - Density: 54.2/sq mi (20.9/km^{2})
- ZIP codes: 47613, 47633, 47639, 47720, 47725
- GNIS feature ID: 453091

Armstrong Township is one of eight townships in Vanderburgh County, Indiana, United States. As of the 2010 census, its population was 1,599 and it contained 634 housing units.

Armstrong Township was established in 1818.

== Geography ==
According to the 2010 census, the township has a total area of 29.52 square miles (76.5 km^{2}), of which 29.48 square miles (76.4 km^{2}) (or 99.86%) is land and 0.04 square miles (0.10 km^{2}) (or 0.14%) is water.

=== Cities and towns ===
- Darmstadt (west edge)

=== Unincorporated towns ===
- Armstrong
- Crossroads
- Martin

=== Adjacent townships ===
- Vanderburgh County
  - German Township (south)
  - Scott Township (east)
- Gibson County
  - Johnson Township (northeast)
- Posey County
  - Robinson Township (southwest)
  - Smith Township (northwest)

=== Airports and landing strips ===
- Hepler Airport

== School districts ==
- Evansville-Vanderburgh School Corporation
- South Gibson School Corporation

== Political districts ==
- Indiana's 8th congressional district
- State House District 75
- State Senate District 49
