= Cypress, Indiana =

- Unincorporated community
- Location within Indiana Location within the United States
- Coordinates: 37°54′51″N 87°37′47″W
- Country: United States
- State: Indiana
- County: Vanderburgh
- Township: Union
- Elevation: 371 ft (113 m)
- Time zone: UTC-6 (Central (CST))
  - Summer (DST): UTC-5 (CDT)
- ZIP code: 47712
- Area codes: 812, 930
- GNIS feature ID: 433608

Cypress is an unincorporated community in Union Township, Vanderburgh County, in the U.S. state of Indiana.

== History ==
An old variant name of the community was Dogtown. A post office was established under the name Cypress in 1882, and remained in operation until 1933.
