= Hooker-Ensle-Pierce House =

Historic house in Indiana, United States

- U.S. National Register of Historic Places
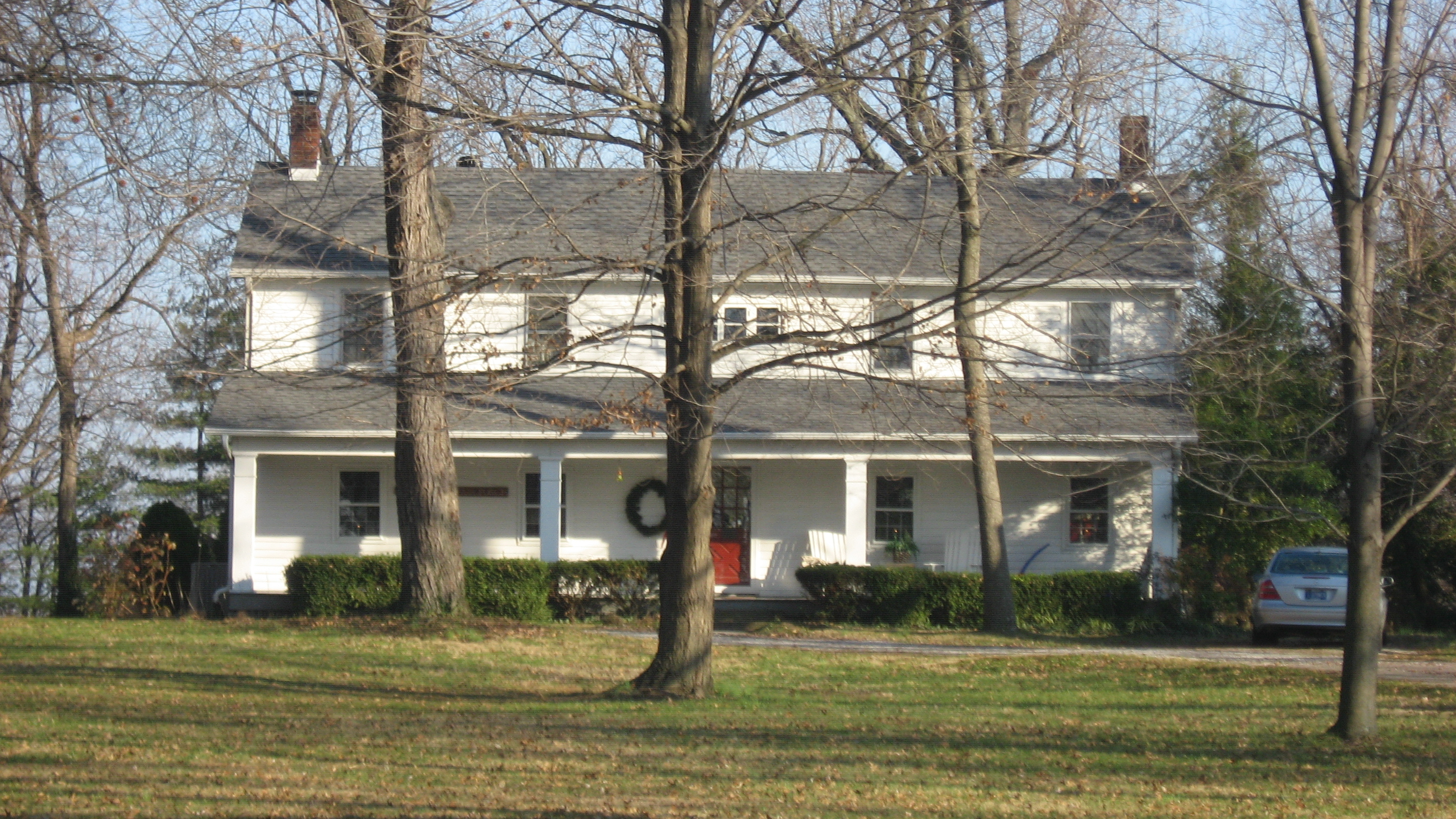
- Hooker-Ensle-Pierce House, December 2011

- Location within Indiana Location within the United States
- Location: 6531 Oak Hill Rd., north of Evansville in Center Township, Vanderburgh County, Indiana
- Coordinates: 38°2′12″N 87°30′31″W
- Area: 1 acre (0.40 ha)
- Built: 1839, 1880s
- NRHP reference No.: 77000022
- Added to NRHP: April 28, 1977

Hooker-Ensle-Pierce House is a historic home located in Center Township, Vanderburgh County, Indiana. The original log cabin was built in 1839, and subsequently expanded with a second log cabin connected by a breezeway. The breezeway was enclosed and the house expanded in the 1880s, and the housed remodeled in 1917 and 1937. The two-story dwelling has a side-gable roof and full-width, one-story front porch.

It was added to the National Register of Historic Places in 1977.
