= Highland, Vanderburgh County, Indiana =

Highland, Indiana
- Census-designated place
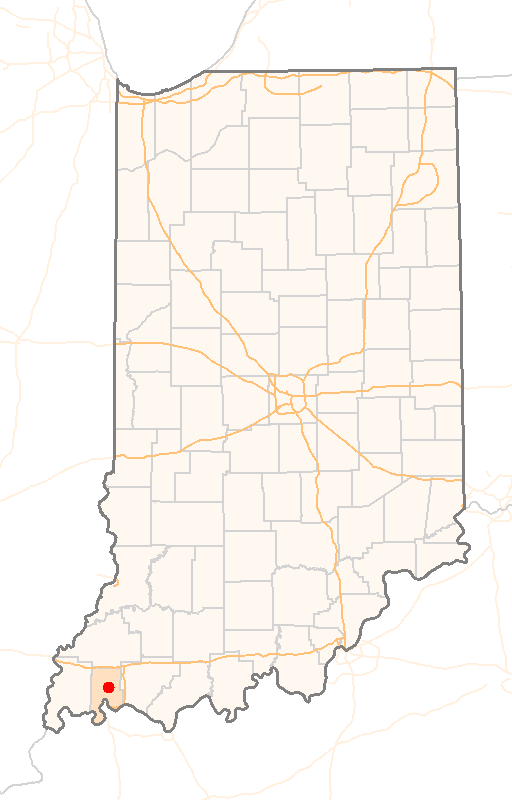
- Location in the state of Indiana
- Coordinates: 38°02′50″N 87°33′41″W
- Country: United States
- State: Indiana
- County: Vanderburgh
- Township: Center

Area
  - Total: 2.28 sq mi (5.90 km^{2})
  - Land: 2.27 sq mi (5.87 km^{2})
  - Water: 0.012 sq mi (0.03 km^{2})
- Elevation: 420 ft (130 m)

Population (2020)
  - Total: 4,435
  - Density: 1,955.9/sq mi (755.17/km^{2})
- Time zone: UTC-6 (Central (CST))
  - Summer (DST): UTC-5 (CDT)
- FIPS Code: 18-33484
- GNIS feature ID: 2393050

Highland is a census-designated place (CDP) in Center Township, Vanderburgh County, in the U.S. state of Indiana. The population was 4,489 at the 2010 census.

== Geography ==
According to the United States Census Bureau, the CDP has a total area of 2.3 square miles (6.0 km^{2}), all land.

== Demographics ==
Historical population
| Census | Pop. | Note | %± |
|---|---|---|---|
| 2020 | 4,435 | | — |
U.S. Decennial Census

As of the census of 2000, there were 4,107 people, 1,498 households, and 1,237 families residing in the CDP. The population density was 1,785.3 inhabitants per square mile (689.3/km^{2}). There were 1,532 housing units at an average density of 666.0 units per square mile (257.1 units/km^{2}). The racial makeup of the CDP was 97.32% White, 0.80% African American, 1.17% Asian, 0.05% Pacific Islander, 0.10% from other races, and 0.56% from two or more races. Hispanic or Latino of any race were 0.44% of the population.

There were 1,498 households, out of which 38.5% had children under the age of 18 living with them, 74.6% were married couples living together, 5.7% had a female householder with no husband present, and 17.4% were non-families. 15.2% of all households were made up of individuals, and 7.8% had someone living alone who was 65 years of age or older. The average household size was 2.71 and the average family size was 3.02.

In the CDP, the population was spread out, with 26.2% under the age of 18, 5.6% from 18 to 24, 27.1% from 25 to 44, 27.8% from 45 to 64, and 13.3% who were 65 years of age or older. The median age was 41 years. For every 100 females, there were 93.3 males. For every 100 females age 18 and over, there were 91.2 males.

The median income for a household in the CDP was $69,975, and the median income for a family was $73,356. Males had a median income of $50,685 versus $31,645 for females. The per capita income for the CDP was $36,716. None of the families and 0.7% of the population were living below the poverty line, including no under eighteens and 5.5% of those over 64.
