= Mechanicsville, Indiana =

- Unincorporated community
- Location within Indiana Location within the United States
- Coordinates: 38°02′01″N 87°33′44″W
- Country: United States
- State: Indiana
- County: Vanderburgh
- Township: Center
- Elevation: 479 ft (146 m)
- Time zone: UTC-6 (Central (CST))
  - Summer (DST): UTC-5 (CDT)
- ZIP code: 47711
- Area codes: 812, 930
- GNIS feature ID: 449471

Mechanicsville is an unincorporated community in Center Township, Vanderburgh County, Indiana, United States.

It is located within the city limits of Evansville.

== History ==
A post office was established at Mechanicsville in 1829, and remained in operation until it was discontinued in 1879.
