= International World War Peace Tree =

War memorial

Coordinates: 38.082985°N 87.59809°W

The International World War Peace Tree is a linden tree on the southwestern edge of Darmstadt, Indiana, serving as a reminder of Germany's armistice with the United States in 1918.

== Description ==
The tree stands on the northwest corner of St. Joseph Avenue and Orchard Road, surrounded by cornfields. Its relative isolation from the nearby forests makes it easy to identify. In front of the tree is a wooden sign reading, "International World War Peace Tree - Nov. 11, 1918". The date marks the end of World War I. The tree is 40 feet (12 m) tall and is at least 113 years old.

The sign in front of the tree is frequently adorned with small American flags, particularly around patriotic holidays such as Memorial Day, Independence Day, and Veterans Day.

== History ==
The tree has its origins in Germany. It was brought to the United States in 1912 as a seedling by Joseph Freudenberg, prior to World War I. When the treaty with Germany was signed in 1918, a picnic was held on the property of his sister-in-law Mrs. Wortman, and during the picnic, Freudenberg's tree was transplanted to its current location at the intersection of St. Joseph and Orchard in celebration of the end the war. The planting and dedication of this tree by German American immigrants served as a sign of their loyalty to America and also to build local community harmony. It was dedicated on August 24, 1919.

Freudenberg mounted a flagpole near the tree, but the flagpole has since been removed, although its cement base remains. The garden of flowers that once adorned the tree has also disappeared.

The tree has been maintained since its arrival in America by the same family:

- 1912 or earlier - 1918: Joseph Freudenberg
- 1918 - 1935?: Herman Wortman, son of Mrs. Wortman (nephew of Joseph Freudenberg).
- 1935? - 1965?: Clarence Wortman Sr, son of Herman.
- 1965? - 1988: Clarence Wortman Jr.
- 1988 – present: Charles Skeels, husband of Clarence Jr's daughter Beth.

== Progeny ==
On November 11, 2020, members of the Veterans For Peace, Chapter 104 - Evansville, IN dedicated a sapling propagated from the tree at Oak Hill Cemetery in the Veterans Plaza along with a plaque with the following inscription:

- Linden -

“Progeny of a tree brought from Germany and planted by the Freudenberg family in Darmstadt, Indiana and dedicated on the Armistice of 11 November 1918.

Propagated by Veterans For Peace in 2018 and transplanted here on 11 November 2020.

May this tree ever stand as a reminder of the universal thread that binds together all humanity - the deep, eternal longing for peace - and of the lives that bear silent witness to our failures.”

== See also ==
- List of individual trees
