= Smythe, Indiana =

- Unincorporated community
- Location within Indiana Location within the United States
- Coordinates: 37°59′29″N 87°29′33″W
- Country: United States
- State: Indiana
- County: Vanderburgh
- Township: Knight
- Elevation: 387 ft (118 m)
- Time zone: UTC-6 (Central (CST))
  - Summer (DST): UTC-5 (CDT)
- ZIP code: 47715
- Area codes: 812, 930
- GNIS feature ID: 443719

Smythe is an unincorporated community in Knight Township, Vanderburgh County, in the U.S. state of Indiana.

It is located within the city limits of Evansville.

== History ==
Smythe was named after a local family of settlers. An old variant name of the community was called Burkhart Station.
