= Center Township, Vanderburgh County, Indiana =

Center Township Vanderburgh County
- Township
- Location in Vanderburgh County
- Coordinates: 38°02′26″N 87°32′22″W
- Country: United States
- State: Indiana
- County: Vanderburgh
- Organized: 1843

Government
  - Type: Indiana township
  - Trustee: Gary Burdsall

Area
  - Total: 34.06 sq mi (88.2 km^{2})
  - Land: 33.62 sq mi (87.1 km^{2})
  - Water: 0.44 sq mi (1.1 km^{2}) 1.29%
- Elevation: 381 ft (116 m)

Population (2020)
  - Total: 40,614
  - Density: 1,208/sq mi (466.4/km^{2})
- Time zone: UTC-6 (Central (CST))
  - Summer (DST): UTC-5 (CDT)
- ZIP codes: 47710, 47711, 47715, 47720, 47725
- Area code(s): 812, 930
- FIPS code: 18-11674
- GNIS feature ID: 453195
- Website: centertwp.org

Center Township is one of eight townships in Vanderburgh County, Indiana, United States. As of the 2020 census, its population was 40,614.

Center Township was organized in 1843.

== History ==
The Hooker-Ensle-Pierce House, McJohnston Chapel and Cemetery, and Charles Sweeton House are listed on the National Register of Historic Places.

== Geography ==
According to the 2010 census, the township has a total area of 34.06 square miles (88.2 km^{2}), of which 33.62 square miles (87.1 km^{2}) (or 98.71%) is land and 0.44 square miles (1.1 km^{2}) (or 1.29%) is water.

=== Cities and towns ===
- Darmstadt (south edge)
- Evansville (north portion)
- Highland (CDP)
- Melody Hill (CDP)

=== Unincorporated communities ===
- Country Club Meadows
- Erskine Station
- Harwood
- Knob Hill
- Kratzville
- Lakewood Hills
- McCutchanville
- Mechanicsville

=== Adjacent townships ===
- Vanderburgh County
  - Scott Township (north)
  - Knight Township (southeast)
  - Perry Township (southwest)
  - Pigeon Township (southwest)
  - German Township (west)
- Warrick County
  - Campbell Township (east)

=== Cemeteries ===
The township contains these eight cemeteries: Bethlehem, Campground, Locust Hill, Mount Carmel, Oak Ridge, Rose Hill, Saint Peters and Sunset Memorial Gardens.

=== Airports and landing strips ===
- Evansville Dress Regional Airport
- Skylane Airport

== School district history ==
As Center Township is part of Vanderburgh County, all students attend schools in the Evansville-Vanderburgh School Corporation.

Center Township Schools, late 1800s

- #1: Stringtown School: NW c. Stringtown & Mill Rds.
- #2: Mt. Pleasant School: NW c. Mt. Pleasant & Old State Rds. (consolidated into Highland School 1923)
- #3: McCutchanville School: c. Whetstone & Petersburg Rds. (consolidated into Oak Hill School, 1966, re-purposed).
- #4: Lynch School: c. of Oak Hill & Lynch Rds. (consolidated into Oak Hill School, 1957, re-purposed)
- #5: Highland School: NE c. Kratzville & Darmstadt Rd./First Ave.
- #6: Union School: Darmstadt Rd. opposite Mohr Rd. (consolidated into Highland School, 1923)
- #7: Hooker School: NW c. Oak Hill & Whetstone Rds. (consolidated into McCutchanville School, 1918)
- #8 Kansas: NE c. Kansas & Green River Rds. (consolidated into McCutchanville School, 1918)
- #9 Hornby/Erskine Station: NE c. Petersburg Rd. and US 41 (consolidated into McCutchanville School, 1918)
- #10 Kratzville: NW c. Kratzville & Mill Rds. (consolidated into Highland School, 1923)
- #11 Harwood/First Ave.: First Ave. N of Lohoff (consolidated into Cedar Hall School, 2011, re-purposed)

In 1918 and 1923, some township schools were consolidated into McCutchanville and Highland Schools, respectively (Lynch and Stringtown Schools remained open). In 1957, Lynch School was consolidated into the new Oak Hill School (grades K–5 only), with McCutchanville School being consolidated into Oak Hill School and closed in 1966 when the grade 6–8 addition to Oak Hill was finished. Central High School moved from downtown Evansville to northern First Avenue/Darmstadt Road in 1973. 1984's reorganization changed a K–8 system into a K–5/6–8 system, while 2011 gave students the relocation of North High School and construction of North Junior High School far north of the city of Evansville, at the intersection of US 41 and Inglefield Rd. (Scott Township). Currently, Stringtown and Highland Elementary Schools (K–5) feed into Thompkins Middle School (6–8), and Harwood district's students attend Cedar Hall School (K–8), with all attending Central High School. East of US 41, students now attend Oak Hill, Vogel or Scott Elementary (K–6), then North Junior High School and North High School.

== Political districts ==
- Indiana's 8th congressional district
- State House District 76
- State House District 78
- State Senate District 49
