= Henry Vanderburgh =

American judge (1760–1812)

Henry Vanderburgh (c. 1760–1812) was an American military officer and jurist. He was one of the first three judges of the United States territorial court for the Indiana Territory (the predecessor to today's U.S. District Courts for the Northern and Southern Districts of Indiana). Substantial documentation exists of Vanderburgh's role as a trader and kidnapper of both free and enslaved Black people.

== Biography ==
Vanderburgh was born in about 1760 in Troy, New York, the son of William Vanderburgh and Margaret Gay. At the age of sixteen, Vanderburgh was made a lieutenant in the 5th New York Regiment of the Continental Army in 1776. Later he was promoted to Captain of the 2nd New York Regiment. He served in the Continental Army until the end of the Revolutionary War. He was an original member of Society of the Cincinnati and his descendants continue to be members.

After the War, Vanderburgh relocated to the Indiana Territory. He was appointed a commissioner for the licensing of Merchants, Traders and Tavernkeepers for Knox County, Indiana in 1792.

Vanderburgh's sister, Mary Vanderburgh, died in New York around 1807. Her husband, William Cook, arrived in Indiana sometime thereafter, and served at the Battle of Tippecanoe in 1811.

President John Adams selected Vanderburgh as one of the first three territorial judges for the Indiana Territory, a position he held until his death in 1812.

He was buried near Vincennes in Knox County.

In 1818, Vanderburgh County, Indiana, was named after Judge Vanderburgh.
