= Scott Township, Vanderburgh County, Indiana =

Scott Township Vanderburgh County
- Township
- Seal

- Location in Vanderburgh County
- Coordinates: 38°06′59″N 87°32′15″W
- Country: United States
- State: Indiana
- County: Vanderburgh
- Organized: 1821
- Named for: Samuel Scott

Government
  - Type: Indiana township
  - Trustee: Keith Kahre

Area
  - Total: 41.8 sq mi (108 km^{2})
  - Land: 41.46 sq mi (107.4 km^{2})
  - Water: 0.34 sq mi (0.88 km^{2}) 0.81%
- Elevation: 489 ft (149 m)

Population (2020)
  - Total: 10,249
  - Density: 247.2/sq mi (95.45/km^{2})
- Time zone: UTC-6 (Central (CST))
  - Summer (DST): UTC-5 (CDT)
- ZIP codes: 47613, 47710, 47720, 47725
- Area code(s): 812, 930
- FIPS code: 18-68472
- GNIS feature ID: 453839
- Website: www.scotttwptrustee-in.com

Scott Township is one of eight townships in Vanderburgh County, Indiana, United States. As of the 2020 census, its population was 10,249. In recent years, Scott Township has become one of the fastest-growing townships in the county.

Scott Township was organized in 1821, and named for Samuel Scott, an early settler.

== Geography ==
According to the 2010 census, the township has a total area of 41.8 square miles (108 km^{2}), of which 41.46 square miles (107.4 km^{2}) (or 99.19%) is land and 0.34 square miles (0.88 km^{2}) (or 0.81%) is water.

=== Cities, towns, villages ===
- Darmstadt (vast majority)

=== Unincorporated towns, communities ===
- Daylight
- Earle
- Elliott
- Hillsdale
- Inglefield
- McCutchanville (part of it)

=== Adjacent townships ===
- Vanderburgh County
  - Armstrong Township (west)
  - Center Township (south)
  - German Township (southwest)
- Gibson County
  - Johnson Township (north)
- Warrick County
  - Campbell Township (southeast)
  - Greer Township (northeast)

=== Cemeteries ===
The township contains these two cemeteries: Blue Grass and Trinity Parish.

=== Major highways ===
- I-64
- I-69
- US 41
- SR 57

== School districts ==
- Evansville-Vanderburgh School Corporation

(Schools in which Scott Township students attend within the Evansville Vanderburgh School Corporation, all of which are actually located within the township with the exception of McCutchanville Elementary, which is located in Center Township):

- McCutchanville Elementary School (K-6)
- Scott Elementary School (K–6)
- North Junior High School (7–8)
- North High School

Also, several students along the northern boundary of Vanderburgh County attend schools in the South Gibson School Corporation, none of which is actually in Scott Township or Vanderburgh County.

== Political districts ==
- Indiana's 8th congressional district
- State House District 78
- State Senate District 50
