= Kratzville, Indiana =

- Unincorporated community
- Location within Indiana Location within the United States
- Coordinates: 38°01′21″N 87°35′08″W
- Country: United States
- State: Indiana
- County: Vanderburgh
- Township: Center
- Elevation: 433 ft (132 m)
- Time zone: UTC-6 (Central (CST))
  - Summer (DST): UTC-5 (CDT)
- ZIP code: 47711
- Area codes: 812, 930
- GNIS feature ID: 449051

Kratzville was an unincorporated community in Center Township, Vanderburgh County, in the U.S. state of Indiana.

It has been annexed by Evansville.
