= Stringtown, Vanderburgh County, Indiana =

Stringtown
- Unincorporated community
- Location within Indiana Location within the United States
- Coordinates: 38°01′15″N 87°33′42″W
- Country: United States
- State: Indiana
- County: Vanderburgh
- Township: Center
- Elevation: 479 ft (146 m)
- Time zone: UTC-6 (Central (CST))
  - Summer (DST): UTC-5 (CDT)
- ZIP code: 47710
- Area code: 812
- GNIS feature ID: 444269

Stringtown is an unincorporated community in Center Township, Vanderburgh County, in the U.S. state of Indiana. There are a number of communities in Indiana named Stringtown.

It is located within the city limits of Evansville.

== History ==
An old variant name of the community was called Zipp, which was named after Frank Zipp Jr., an early postmaster. A post office was established under the name Zipp in 1881, and remained in operation until it was discontinued in 1902.

Stringtown was so named on account of its houses being strung along the road.
