= Elliott, Indiana =

- Unincorporated community
- Location within Indiana Location within the United States
- Coordinates: 38°07′18″N 87°28′22″W
- Country: United States
- State: Indiana
- County: Vanderburgh
- Township: Scott
- Elevation: 413 ft (126 m)
- Time zone: UTC-6 (Central (CST))
  - Summer (DST): UTC-5 (CDT)
- ZIP code: 47725
- Area codes: 812, 930
- GNIS feature ID: 434097

Elliott is an unincorporated community in Scott Township, Vanderburgh County, in the U.S. state of Indiana.
