= List of United States Supreme Court cases, volume 64 =

Supreme Court of the United States
- Interactive map of Supreme Court of the United States
- 38°53′26″N 77°00′16″W
- Established: March 4, 1789; 236 years ago
- Location: Washington, D.C.
- Coordinates: 38°53′26″N 77°00′16″W
- Composition method: Presidential nomination with Senate confirmation
- Authorised by: Constitution of the United States, Art. III, § 1
- Judge term length: life tenure, subject to impeachment and removal
- Number of positions: 9 (by statute)
- Website: supremecourt.gov

This is a list of cases reported in volume 64 (23 How.) of United States Reports, decided by the Supreme Court of the United States in 1859 and 1860.

== Nominative reports ==
In 1874, the U.S. government created the United States Reports, and retroactively numbered older privately published case reports as part of the new series. As a result, cases appearing in volumes 1–90 of U.S. Reports have dual citation forms; one for the volume number of U.S. Reports, and one for the volume number of the reports named for the relevant reporter of decisions (these are called "nominative reports").

=== Benjamin Chew Howard ===
Starting with the 42nd volume of U.S. Reports, the Reporter of Decisions of the Supreme Court of the United States was Benjamin Chew Howard. Howard was Reporter of Decisions from 1843 to 1860, covering volumes 42 through 65 of United States Reports which correspond to volumes 1 through 24 of his Howard's Reports. As such, the dual form of citation to, for example, Yontz v. United States is 64 U.S. (23 How.) 495 (1860).

== Justices of the Supreme Court at the time of 64 U.S. (23 How.) ==
The Supreme Court is established by Article III, Section 1 of the Constitution of the United States, which says: "The judicial Power of the United States, shall be vested in one supreme Court . . .". The size of the Court is not specified; the Constitution leaves it to Congress to set the number of justices. Under the Judiciary Act of 1789 Congress originally fixed the number of justices at six (one chief justice and five associate justices). Since 1789 Congress has varied the size of the Court from six to seven, nine, ten, and back to nine justices (always including one chief justice).

When the cases in 64 U.S. (23 How.) were decided the Court comprised these nine members:

Portrait	Justice	Office	Home State	Succeeded	Date confirmed by the Senate (Vote)	Tenure on Supreme Court
	Roger B. Taney	Chief Justice	Maryland	John Marshall	March 15, 1836 (29–15)	March 28, 1836 – October 12, 1864 (Died)
	John McLean	Associate Justice	Ohio	Robert Trimble	March 7, 1829 (Acclamation)	January 11, 1830 – April 4, 1861 (Died)
	James Moore Wayne	Associate Justice	Georgia	William Johnson	January 9, 1835 (Acclamation)	January 14, 1835 – July 5, 1867 (Died)
	John Catron	Associate Justice	Tennessee	newly created seat	March 8, 1837 (28–15)	May 1, 1837 – May 30, 1865 (Died)
	Peter Vivian Daniel	Associate Justice	Virginia	Philip P. Barbour	March 2, 1841 (25–5)	January 10, 1842 – May 31, 1860 (Died)
	Samuel Nelson	Associate Justice	New York	Smith Thompson	February 14, 1845 (Acclamation)	February 27, 1845 – November 28, 1872 (Retired)
	Robert Cooper Grier	Associate Justice	Pennsylvania	Henry Baldwin	August 4, 1846 (Acclamation)	August 10, 1846 – January 31, 1870 (Retired)
	John Archibald Campbell	Associate Justice	Alabama	John McKinley	March 22, 1853 (Acclamation)	April 11, 1853 – April 30, 1861 (Resigned)
	Nathan Clifford	Associate Justice	Maine	Benjamin Robbins Curtis	January 12, 1858 (26–23)	January 21, 1858 – July 25, 1881 (Died)

== Citation style ==
Under the Judiciary Act of 1789 the federal court structure at the time comprised District Courts, which had general trial jurisdiction; Circuit Courts, which had mixed trial and appellate (from the US District Courts) jurisdiction; and the United States Supreme Court, which had appellate jurisdiction over the federal District and Circuit courts—and for certain issues over state courts. The Supreme Court also had limited original jurisdiction (i.e., in which cases could be filed directly with the Supreme Court without first having been heard by a lower federal or state court). There were one or more federal District Courts and/or Circuit Courts in each state, territory, or other geographical region.

Bluebook citation style is used for case names, citations, and jurisdictions.

- "C.C.D." = United States Circuit Court for the District of . . .
  - e.g.,"C.C.D.N.J." = United States Circuit Court for the District of New Jersey
- "D." = United States District Court for the District of . . .
  - e.g.,"D. Mass." = United States District Court for the District of Massachusetts
- "E." = Eastern; "M." = Middle; "N." = Northern; "S." = Southern; "W." = Western
  - e.g.,"C.C.S.D.N.Y." = United States Circuit Court for the Southern District of New York
  - e.g.,"M.D. Ala." = United States District Court for the Middle District of Alabama
- "Ct. Cl." = United States Court of Claims
- The abbreviation of a state's name alone indicates the highest appellate court in that state's judiciary at the time.
  - e.g.,"Pa." = Supreme Court of Pennsylvania
  - e.g.,"Me." = Supreme Judicial Court of Maine

== List of cases in 64 U.S. (23 How.) ==
Case Name	Page & year	Opinion of the Court	Concurring opinion(s)	Dissenting opinion(s)	Lower Court	Disposition
Anson B. & Co. v. Blue Ridge R.R. Co.	1 (1860)	Nelson	none	none	C.C.N.D. Ga.	dismissed
Teese v. Huntingdon	2 (1860)	Clifford	none	none	N.D. Cal.	affirmed
Lawrence v. Tucker	14 (1860)	Wayne	none	none	C.C.N.D. Ill.	affirmed
Richardson v. Goddard	28 (1860)	Grier	none	none	C.C.D. Mass.	reversed
Middleton v. McGrew	45 (1859)	Campbell	none	none	E.D. Tex.	affirmed
Oelricks v. Ford	49 (1860)	Nelson	none	none	C.C.D. Md.	affirmed
Dubuque & P.R.R. Co. v. Litchfield	66 (1860)	Catron	none	none	D. Iowa	reversed
Green's Adm'x v. Creighton	90 (1860)	Campbell	none	none	C.C.S.D. Miss.	reversed
Cage's Ex'rs v. Cassidy	109 (1860)	Campbell	none	none	C.C.S.D. Miss.	reversed
Pennock v. Coe	117 (1860)	Nelson	none	none	C.C.N.D. Ohio	affirmed
Flowers v. Foreman	132 (1859)	Wayne	none	none	C.C.D. Md.	affirmed
Benjamin v. Hillard	149 (1860)	Campbell	none	none	C.C.S.D.N.Y.	affirmed
Ogden v. Parsons	167 (1860)	Grier	none	none	C.C.S.D.N.Y.	affirmed
Irvine v. Redfleld	170 (1860)	Wayne	none	none	C.C.S.D.N.Y.	certification
Castle v. Bullard	172 (1860)	Clifford	none	none	C.C.N.D. Ill.	affirmed
Beaubien v. Beaubien	190 (1860)	Nelson	none	none	C.C.D. Mich.	affirmed
Philadelphia et al. R.R. v. Philadelphia & H.G. Towboat	209 (1860)	Grier	none	none	C.C.D. Md.	affirmed
Dermott v. Jones	220 (1860)	Wayne	none	none	C.C.D.C.	reversed
Hooper v. Scheimer	235 (1860)	Catron	none	none	C.C.E.D. Ark.	affirmed
United States v. White	249 (1860)	Grier	none	none	N.D. Cal.	reversed
United States v. Bennitz	255 (1860)	Campbell	none	none	N.D. Cal.	reversed
United States v. Rose	262 (1860)	Campbell	none	none	N.D. Cal.	reversed
United States v. Osio	273 (1860)	Clifford	none	none	N.D. Cal.	reversed
Haney v. Baltimore S.P. Co.	287 (1860)	Grier	none	Taney	C.C.D. Md.	reversed
Day v. Washburn	309 (1860)	Wayne	none	none	C.C.D. Ind.	dismissal denied
United States v. Noe	312 (1860)	Campbell	none	none	N.D. Cal.	reversed
United States v. Alviso	318 (1860)	Campbell	none	none	N.D. Cal.	affirmed
Sutton v. Bancroft	320 (1860)	Grier	none	none	W.D. Ark.	affirmed
United States v. Pico	321 (1860)	Campbell	none	none	N.D. Cal.	reversed
United States v. Gomez	326 (1860)	Wayne	none	none	S.D. Cal.	dismissal vacated
United States v. Bolton	341 (1860)	Catron	none	none	N.D. Cal.	reversed
Adams v. Norris	353 (1860)	Campbell	none	none	C.C.D. Cal.	affirmed
Wiseman v. Chiappella	368 (1860)	Wayne	none	none	C.C.E.D. La.	affirmed
Zabriskie v. Cleveland et al. R.R. Co.	381 (1860)	Campbell	none	none	C.C.N.D. Ohio	affirmed
Orient M. Ins. Co. v. Wright ex rel. Maxwell W. & Co.	401 (1860)	Nelson	none	none	C.C.D. Md.	reversed
Sun M. Ins. Co. v. Wright ex rel. Maxwell W. & Co.	412 (1860)	Nelson	none	Clifford	C.C.D. Md.	reversed
Bliven v. New Eng. S. Co. I	420 (1860)	Clifford	none	none	C.C.S.D.N.Y.	affirmed
Bliven v. New Eng. S. Co. II	433 (1860)	Clifford	none	none	C.C.S.D.N.Y.	affirmed
Minturn v. Larue	435 (1860)	Nelson	none	none	C.C.N.D. Cal.	affirmed
Castro v. Hendricks	438 (1860)	Campbell	none	none	C.C.D.C.	affirmed
Bell v. City of Vicksburg	443 (1860)	Campbell	none	none	C.C.S.D. Miss.	reversed
Frederickson v. Louisiana	445 (1860)	Campbell	none	none	La.	affirmed
Whitridge v. Dill	448 (1860)	Clifford	none	none	C.C.D. Md.	affirmed
Jenkins v. Banning	455 (1860)	Clifford	none	none	D. Wis.	affirmed
Doe v. Wilson	457 (1860)	Catron	none	none	C.C.D. Ind.	affirmed
United States v. Castillero	464 (1860)	Clifford	none	none	S.D. Cal.	affirmed
Very v. Watkins	469 (1860)	Wayne	none	none	C.C.E.D. Ark.	affirmed
United States v. Murphy	476 (1860)	Campbell	none	none	N.D. Cal.	reversed
Callan v. Statham	477 (1860)	Nelson	none	none	C.C.D.C.	affirmed
Clifton v. Sheldon	481 (1860)	Nelson	none	none	C.C.S.D.N.Y.	dismissed
Green v. Custard	484 (1860)	Grier	none	none	W.D. Tex.	reversed
City of New York v. Ransom	487 (1860)	Grier	none	none	C.C.S.D.N.Y.	reversed
Morewood v. Enequist	491 (1860)	Grier	none	none	C.C.S.D.N.Y.	affirmed
Yontz v. United States	495 (1860)	Catron	none	none	N.D. Cal.	affirmed
United States v. Berreyesa's Heirs	499 (1860)	Campbell	none	none	N.D. Cal.	affirmed
Gridley v. Wynant	500 (1860)	Campbell	none	none	N.D. Iowa	affirmed
Gridley v. Westbrook	503 (1860)	Campbell	none	none	N.D. Iowa	affirmed
Alabama v. Georgia	505 (1860)	Wayne	none	none	original	boundary set
Luco v. United States	515 (1860)	Grier	none	none	N.D. Cal.	affirmed

== See also ==
certificate of division
