= McJohnston Chapel and Cemetery =

Historic church in Indiana, United States

- U.S. National Register of Historic Places
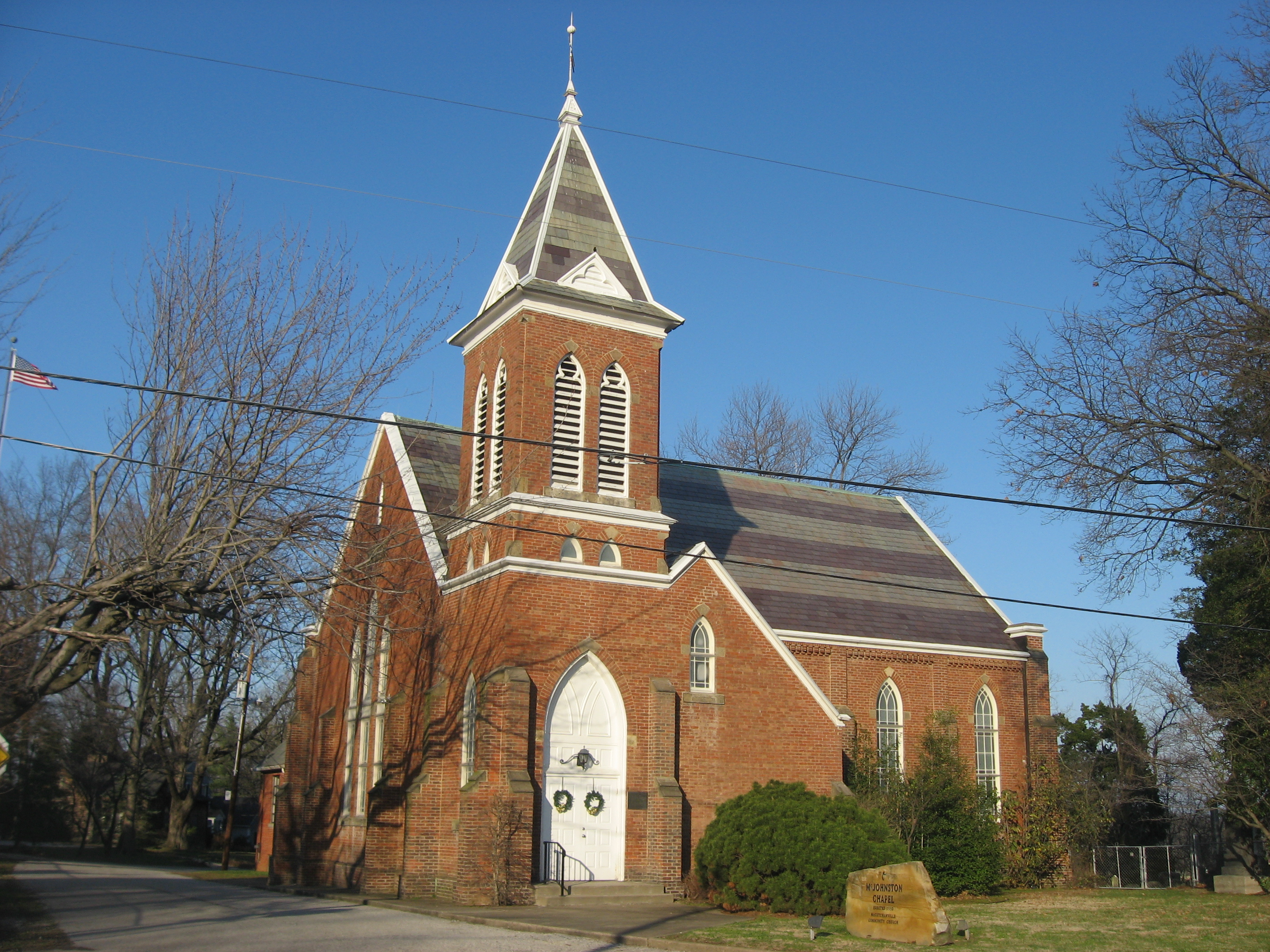
- McJohnston Chapel, December 2011

- Location within Indiana Location within the United States
- Location: Kansas Rd. and Erskine Lane at McCutchanville, Indiana
- Coordinates: 38°3′51″N 87°31′23″W
- Area: 2 acres (0.81 ha)
- Built: 1880
- Architect: Vrydagh, Josse A.
- Architectural style: Gothic
- NRHP reference No.: 79000051
- Added to NRHP: January 18, 1979

McJohnston Chapel and Cemetery is a historic chapel and cemetery located in Center Township, Vanderburgh County, Indiana. It was built in 1880, and is a small Gothic Revival style, rectangular red brick building. It has a projecting vestibule topped by a bell tower and steeple. Adjacent to the chapel is the cemetery, with the oldest gravestone dated to 1819. It is the oldest cemetery in Vanderburgh County that remain in use.

It was added to the National Register of Historic Places in 1979.
