= Charles Sweeton House =

Historic house in Indiana, United States

- U.S. National Register of Historic Places
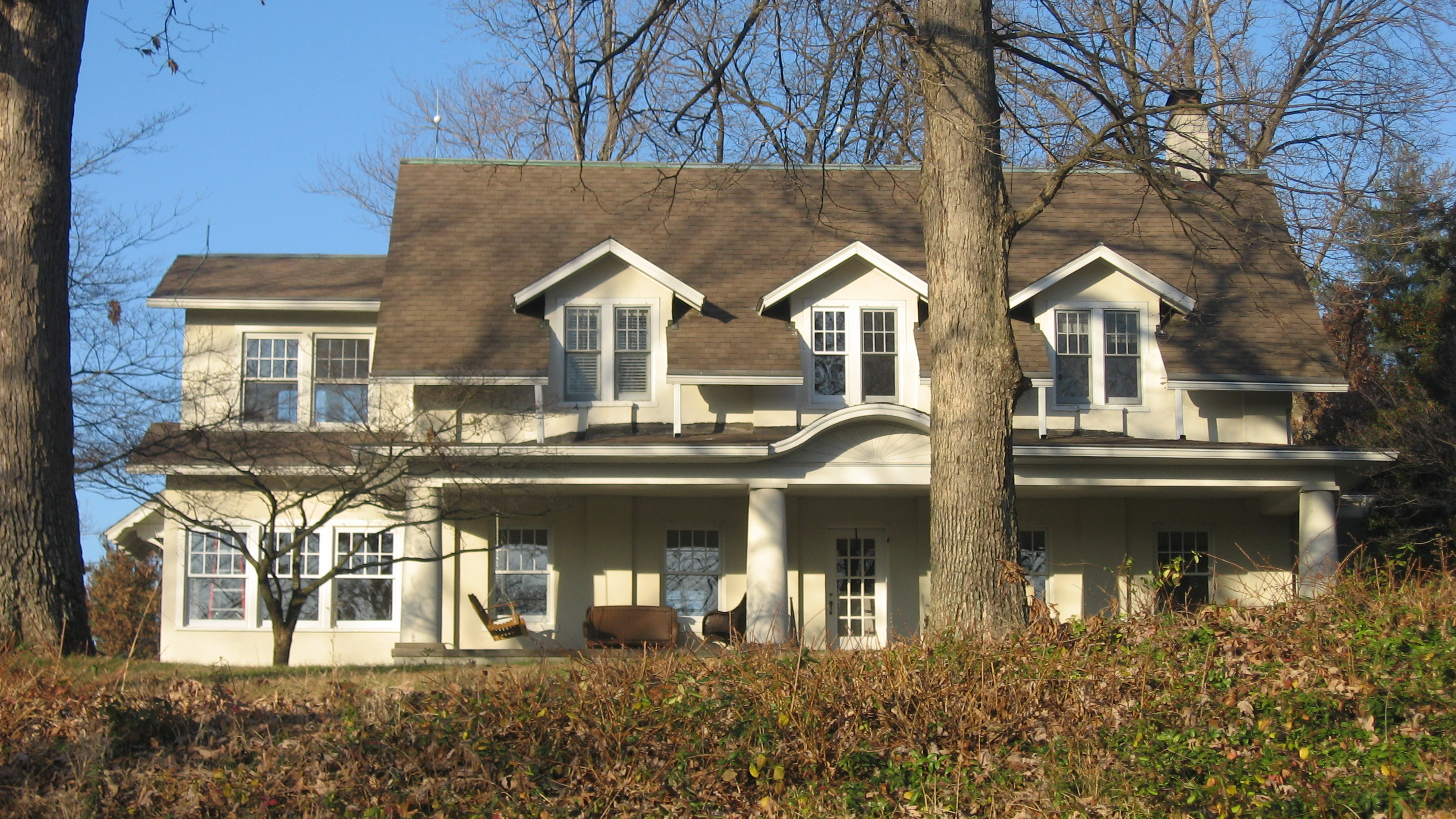
- Charles Sweeton House, December 2011

- Location within Indiana Location within the United States
- Location: 8700 Old State Rd., north of Evansville in Center Township, Vanderburgh County, Indiana
- Coordinates: 38°3′30″N 87°33′43″W
- Area: 1.2 acres (0.49 ha)
- Built: 1888, 1926
- Architect: Jamison, Walter; Meier, Jacob and Walter
- Architectural style: Bungalow/craftsman
- NRHP reference No.: 05000196
- Added to NRHP: March 25, 2005

Charles Sweeton House, also known as Mount Pleasant School, is a historic home located in Center Township, Vanderburgh County, Indiana. The original two-room brick Mount Pleasant schoolhouse was built in 1888, and remodeled and expanded in 1926 into a two-story, Bungalow style private residence. The exterior is sheathed in stucco and the front facade features a full-width one-story porch with Doric order columns and a central eyebrow arch.

It was added to the National Register of Historic Places in 2005.
