= Earle, Indiana =

- Unincorporated community
- Location within Indiana Location within the United States
- Coordinates: 38°05′08″N 87°30′48″W
- Country: United States
- State: Indiana
- County: Vanderburgh
- Township: Scott
- Elevation: 449 ft (137 m)
- Time zone: UTC-6 (Central (CST))
  - Summer (DST): UTC-5 (CDT)
- ZIP code: 47725
- Area codes: 812, 930
- GNIS feature ID: 433861

Earle is an unincorporated community in Scott Township, Vanderburgh County, in the U.S. state of Indiana.

Earle's main features include Pizza Depot, a Marathon gas station with a Bonkerz store, and a sit-down restaurant called the Hornet's Nest.

== History ==
A post office was established at Earle in 1871, and remained in operation until it was discontinued in 1901.
