= Knight Township, Vanderburgh County, Indiana =

Knight Township Vanderburgh County
- Township
- Seal

- Location in Vanderburgh County
- Coordinates: 37°58′03″N 87°29′48″W
- Country: United States
- State: Indiana
- County: Vanderburgh
- Organized: 1840

Government
  - Type: Indiana township
  - Trustee: Kathryn M. Martin

Area
  - Total: 34.79 sq mi (90.1 km^{2})
  - Land: 34.19 sq mi (88.6 km^{2})
  - Water: 0.6 sq mi (1.6 km^{2}) 1.72%
- Elevation: 387 ft (118 m)

Population (2020)
  - Total: 68,625
  - Density: 2,007/sq mi (775.0/km^{2})
- Time zone: UTC-6 (Central (CST))
  - Summer (DST): UTC-5 (CDT)
- ZIP codes: 47711, 47713, 47714, 47715
- Area code(s): 812, 930
- FIPS code: 18-40212
- GNIS feature ID: 453528
- Website: knighttownship.com

Knight Township is one of eight townships in Vanderburgh County, Indiana, United States. As of the 2020 census, its population was 68,625. Knight Township has the largest township population in Southwestern Indiana and is the home of nearly 40 percent of Vanderburgh County's population.

== History ==
Knight Township was organized in 1840 from the eastern two thirds of Pigeon Township.

On October 1, 2009, the City of Evansville officially annexed territory within Knight Township bounded between Burkhardt Road, the Lloyd Expressway and Morgan Avenue.

== Geography ==
According to the 2010 census, the township has a total area of 34.79 square miles (90.1 km^{2}), of which 34.19 square miles (88.6 km^{2}) (or 98.28%) is land and 0.6 square miles (1.6 km^{2}) (or 1.72%) is water.

=== Cities and towns ===
- Evansville (southeast side)

=== Unincorporated towns ===
- Smythe

=== Adjacent townships ===
- Indiana
  - Vanderburgh County
    - Pigeon Township (west)
    - Center Township (northwest)
  - Warrick County
    - Campbell Township (northeast)
    - Ohio Township (east)

=== Cemeteries ===
The township contains these two cemeteries: Oak Hill and Oates Memorial Park.

=== Airports and landing strips ===
- Saint Marys Medical Center Airport

=== Lakes ===
- Cross Lake

=== Landmarks ===
- Angel Mounds
- University of Evansville
- Swonder Ice Arena
- Wesselman Woods
- Eastland Mall
- Washington Square Mall

== School districts ==
- Evansville-Vanderburgh School Corporation

== Political districts ==
- Indiana's 8th congressional district
- State House District 75
- State House District 77
- State House District 78
- State Senate District 49
- State Senate District 50
- Evansville City Ward 1
- Evansville City Ward 2
- Evansville City Ward 3
- Evansville City Ward 4
- Evansville City Ward 5
