= Vanderburgh County, Indiana =

County in Indiana, United States

- County
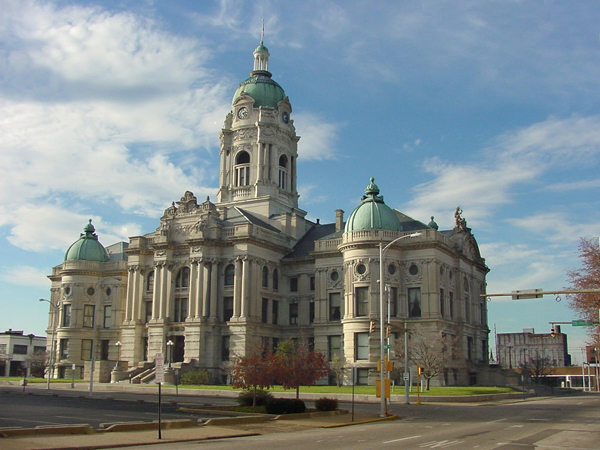
- The Old Vanderburgh County Courthouse

- Seal Logo

- Location within the U.S. state of Indiana
- Coordinates: 38°01′N 87°35′W
- Country: United States
- State: Indiana
- Founded: January 7, 1818
- Named for: Henry Vanderburgh
- Seat: Evansville
- Largest city: Evansville

Area
  - Total: 236.33 sq mi (612.1 km^{2})
  - Land: 233.48 sq mi (604.7 km^{2})
  - Water: 2.86 sq mi (7.4 km^{2}) 1.21%

Population (2020)
  - Total: 180,136
  - Estimate (2025): 181,995 ▲
  - Density: 771.53/sq mi (297.89/km^{2})
- Time zone: UTC−6 (Central)
  - Summer (DST): UTC−5 (CDT)
- Congressional district: 8th
- Website: www.vanderburghgov.org
- Indiana county number 82; Eighth-largest county in Indiana by population as of 2020; Eighth-smallest county in Indiana by area

Vanderburgh County is a county in the U.S. state of Indiana. As of 2020, the population was 180,136. The county seat is Evansville. While Vanderburgh County was the eighth-largest county in 2020 population in Indiana, it is also the eighth-smallest county in area and the smallest in southwestern Indiana, covering only 236 square miles (610 km^{2}). Vanderburgh County forms the core of the Evansville metropolitan statistical area.

== History ==
Vanderburgh County was formed on January 7, 1818, from Gibson, Posey, and Warrick counties. It was named for Captain Henry Vanderburgh, Revolutionary War veteran and judge for the Indiana Territory.

== Geography ==
According to the 2010 census, the county has an area of 236.33 square miles (612.1 km^{2}), of which 233.48 square miles (604.7 km^{2}) (or 98.79%) is land and 2.86 square miles (7.4 km^{2}) (or 1.21%) is water.

=== Regional ===
- Illinois–Indiana–Kentucky tri-state area
- Southwestern Indiana

=== Adjacent counties ===
- Gibson County – north
- Posey County – west
- Henderson County, Kentucky – south
- Warrick County – east

=== Cities and towns ===
- Darmstadt
- Evansville

=== Census-designated places ===
- Highland
- Melody Hill

=== Unincorporated towns ===
- Armstrong
- Cypress
- Daylight
- Earle
- Elliott
- Erskine Station
- Harwood
- Inglefield
- Kasson
- Knob Hill
- Kratzville
- McCutchanville
- Mechanicsville
- Mud Center
- Red Bank
- Saint Joseph
- Saint Wendel
- Smythe
- Stringtown

=== Townships ===
(2000 population)

- Armstrong (1,651)
- Center (32,220)
- German (7,354)
- Knight (67,941)
- Perry (23,687)
- Pigeon (33,682)
- Scott (5,445)
- Union (392)

=== Major highways ===
- I-64
- I-69
- US 41
- SR 57
- SR 62
- SR 65
- SR 66

== Climate and weather ==
Evansville, Indiana

Climate chart (precipitation, max. and min. temperature)
J	F	M	A	M	J	J	A	S	O	N	D
3.1 42 25	3.3 48 29	4.5 59 37	4.5 70 46	4.8 79 55	4.2 87 64	4.1 91 69	3.1 90 67	3.2 83 60	3 72 48	4.3 58 39	3.7 46 29
- █ Average max. and min. temperatures in °F
- █ Precipitation totals in inches
- Source: The Weather Channel
Metric conversion
J	F	M	A	M	J	J	A	S	O	N	D
80 6 −4	83 9 −2	114 15 3	115 21 8	121 26 13	107 31 18	104 33 21	79 32 19	81 28 16	75 22 9	109 14 4	93 8 −2
- █ Average max. and min. temperatures in °C
- █ Precipitation totals in mm

In recent years, average temperatures in Evansville have ranged from a low of 25 °F (−4 °C) in January to a high of 91 °F (33 °C) in July, although a record low of −17 °F (−27 °C) was recorded in January 1985 and a record high of 109 °F (43 °C) was recorded in July 1954. Average monthly precipitation ranged from 2.96 inches (75 mm) in October to 4.78 inches (121 mm) in May.

== Government ==
The county government is a constitutional body, and is granted specific powers by the Constitution of Indiana, and by the Indiana Code.

County council: The county council is the fiscal branch of the county government that has the legislative responsibilities for the spending and revenue collection in the county. Four representatives are elected from county districts and three are elected at-large by the entire county. The council members serve four-year terms. They are responsible for setting salaries, the annual budget, and special spending. The council also has limited authority to impose local taxes, in the form of an income and property tax that is subject to state level approval, excise taxes, and service taxes.

Board of commissioners: The executive body of the county is made of a board of commissioners. The commissioners are elected county-wide but must live within the district of the seat they hold, in staggered terms, and each serves a four-year term. One of the commissioners, typically the most senior, serves as president. The commissioners are charged with executing the acts legislated by the council, collecting revenue, and managing the day-to-day functions of the county government.

Court: The county has eight state trial courts of original jurisdiction. One circuit court and seven superior courts. The judges offices are non-partisan with terms of six years. A judge must be a member of the Indiana Bar Association. The judges are assisted by magistrates that are appointed. circuit court.

County officials: The county has several other elected offices, including sheriff, coroner, auditor, treasurer, recorder, surveyor, and circuit court clerk. Each of these elected officers serves a term of four years and oversees a different part of county government. Members elected to county government positions are required to declare party affiliations and to be residents of the county.

United States presidential election results for Vanderburgh County, Indiana
Year	Republican		Democratic		Third party(ies)	
Year	No.	%	No.	%	No.	%
1888	6,027	50.23%	5,889	49.08%	82	0.68%
1892	6,175	48.52%	6,166	48.45%	386	3.03%
1896	8,068	52.74%	7,132	46.62%	97	0.63%
1900	8,228	51.59%	7,178	45.00%	544	3.41%
1904	8,624	51.65%	5,885	35.25%	2,187	13.10%
1908	9,116	49.43%	8,033	43.56%	1,294	7.02%
1912	4,839	27.37%	7,219	40.83%	5,624	31.81%
1916	9,966	47.52%	10,028	47.81%	979	4.67%
1920	19,357	52.39%	13,904	37.63%	3,685	9.97%
1924	25,907	55.29%	17,186	36.68%	3,763	8.03%
1928	29,067	59.44%	19,646	40.17%	192	0.39%
1932	16,873	33.91%	31,828	63.97%	1,051	2.11%
1936	14,725	25.79%	41,490	72.68%	870	1.52%
1940	28,417	42.25%	38,567	57.33%	283	0.42%
1944	30,684	46.87%	34,440	52.61%	338	0.52%
1948	27,584	45.25%	32,640	53.55%	732	1.20%
1952	42,010	58.20%	29,718	41.17%	459	0.64%
1956	42,462	57.68%	30,860	41.92%	297	0.40%
1960	41,068	52.90%	36,330	46.80%	237	0.31%
1964	27,231	37.10%	45,796	62.39%	380	0.52%
1968	38,231	49.28%	31,326	40.38%	8,020	10.34%
1972	48,806	68.32%	22,163	31.02%	468	0.66%
1976	37,975	51.87%	34,911	47.69%	325	0.44%
1980	36,248	51.07%	29,930	42.17%	4,804	6.77%
1984	40,994	56.68%	31,049	42.93%	287	0.40%
1988	38,928	55.25%	31,270	44.38%	255	0.36%
1992	30,271	39.39%	33,799	43.99%	12,770	16.62%
1996	28,509	43.22%	30,934	46.90%	6,518	9.88%
2000	35,846	54.13%	29,222	44.13%	1,153	1.74%
2004	41,463	58.68%	28,767	40.72%	424	0.60%
2008	37,512	48.15%	39,423	50.60%	978	1.26%
2012	39,389	54.26%	31,725	43.71%	1,474	2.03%
2016	40,496	55.19%	28,530	38.88%	4,349	5.93%
2020	41,844	53.88%	34,415	44.31%	1,403	1.81%
2024	41,056	55.61%	31,727	42.97%	1,049	1.42%

Vanderburgh County is generally a Republican-leaning swing county in presidential elections. Only two Democratic candidates - George McGovern in 1972 and Hillary Clinton in 2016 - have failed to win 40 percent of the county's vote since 1928. The city of Evansville itself is a swing city; it voted for Donald Trump in 2016 by 4 points, and four years later for Joe Biden, also by 4 points. In 2020, former Evansville mayor Jonathan Weinzapfel (a Democrat) carried the county in his bid for the office of Attorney General but lost statewide.

The county is located in the 8th congressional district, which was notoriously dubbed "The Bloody Eighth" because of its tendency to oust incumbents from both parties - since 1933, no Congressman has represented the district longer than 12 years in a row.

== Demographics ==
Historical population
Census	Pop.	Note	%±
1820	1,798		—
1830	2,611		45.2%
1840	6,250		139.4%
1850	11,414		82.6%
1860	20,552		80.1%
1870	33,145		61.3%
1880	42,193		27.3%
1890	59,809		41.8%
1900	71,769		20.0%
1910	77,438		7.9%
1920	92,293		19.2%
1930	113,320		22.8%
1940	130,783		15.4%
1950	160,422		22.7%
1960	165,794		3.3%
1970	168,772		1.8%
1980	167,515		−0.7%
1990	165,058		−1.5%
2000	171,922		4.2%
2010	179,703		4.5%
2020	180,136		0.2%
2025 (est.)	181,995	▲	1.0%
U.S. Decennial Census; 1790–1960 1900–1990; 1990–2000 2010

=== Racial and ethnic composition ===
Vanderburgh County, Indiana – Racial and ethnic composition Note: the US Census treats Hispanic/Latino as an ethnic category. This table excludes Latinos from the racial categories and assigns them to a separate category. Hispanics/Latinos may be of any race.
Race / Ethnicity (NH = Non-Hispanic)	Pop 1980	Pop 1990	Pop 2000	Pop 2010	Pop 2020	% 1980	% 1990	% 2000	% 2010	% 2020
White alone (NH)	153,791	150,576	152,547	153,080	143,444	91.81%	91.23%	88.73%	85.18%	79.63%
Black or African American alone (NH)	11,848	12,354	14,008	16,228	17,459	7.07%	7.48%	8.15%	9.03%	9.69%
Native American or Alaska Native alone (NH)	191	274	279	345	331	0.11%	0.17%	0.16%	0.19%	0.18%
Asian alone (NH)	657	898	1,284	1,986	2,411	0.39%	0.54%	0.75%	1.11%	1.34%
Native Hawaiian or Pacific Islander alone (NH)	x	x	60	89	677	x	x	0.03%	0.05%	0.38%
Other race alone (NH)	265	73	251	388	709	0.16%	0.04%	0.15%	0.22%	0.39%
Mixed race or Multiracial (NH)	x	x	1,814	3,714	8,792	x	x	1.06%	2.07%	4.88%
Hispanic or Latino (any race)	763	883	1,679	3,873	6,313	0.46%	0.53%	0.98%	2.16%	3.50%
Total	167,515	165,058	171,922	179,703	180,136	100.00%	100.00%	100.00%	100.00%	100.00%

=== 2020 census ===
As of the 2020 census, the county had a population of 180,136. The median age was 38.6 years. 21.6% of residents were under the age of 18 and 17.9% of residents were 65 years of age or older. For every 100 females there were 94.3 males, and for every 100 females age 18 and over there were 91.5 males age 18 and over.

The racial makeup of the county was 80.6% White, 9.8% Black or African American, 0.2% American Indian and Alaska Native, 1.4% Asian, 0.4% Native Hawaiian and Pacific Islander, 1.6% from some other race, and 6.0% from two or more races. Hispanic or Latino residents of any race comprised 3.5% of the population.

92.0% of residents lived in urban areas, while 8.0% lived in rural areas.

There were 76,084 households in the county, of which 27.0% had children under the age of 18 living in them. Of all households, 41.0% were married-couple households, 21.1% were households with a male householder and no spouse or partner present, and 30.0% were households with a female householder and no spouse or partner present. About 33.6% of all households were made up of individuals and 12.7% had someone living alone who was 65 years of age or older.

There were 84,058 housing units, of which 9.5% were vacant. Among occupied housing units, 63.5% were owner-occupied and 36.5% were renter-occupied. The homeowner vacancy rate was 1.8% and the rental vacancy rate was 11.6%.

=== 2010 census ===
As of the 2010 United States census, there were 179,703 people, 74,454 households, and 45,118 families residing in the county. The population density was 769.7 inhabitants per square mile (297.2/km^{2}). There were 83,003 housing units at an average density of 355.5 per square mile (137.3/km^{2}). The racial makeup of the county was 86.2% white, 9.1% black or African American, 1.1% Asian, 0.2% American Indian, 0.1% Pacific islander, 1.0% from other races, and 2.3% from two or more races. Those of Hispanic or Latino origin made up 2.2% of the population. In terms of ancestry, 32.3% were German, 18.3% were American, 11.7% were Irish, and 9.4% were English.

Of the 74,454 households, 28.9% had children under the age of 18 living with them, 42.9% were married couples living together, 13.1% had a female householder with no husband present, 39.4% were non-families, and 32.3% of all households were made up of individuals. The average household size was 2.31 and the average family size was 2.93. The median age was 37.5 years.

The median income for a household in the county was $47,697 and the median income for a family was $57,076. Males had a median income of $42,663 versus $31,037 for females. The per capita income for the county was $23,945. About 10.7% of families and 15.6% of the population were below the poverty line, including 22.4% of those under age 18 and 7.7% of those age 65 or over.

== Education ==
The entire county is in the Evansville-Vanderburgh School Corporation.

== See also ==
- National Register of Historic Places listings in Vanderburgh County, Indiana
