= Nob Hill at Guantanamo Bay Naval Station =

The Nob Hill neighborhood of Guantanamo Bay Naval Base of the United States Navy in Guantánamo Bay, Cuba, is located at the northeast end of Sherman Avenue. It is approximately 1/2 mi (0.80 km) south from the now-mothballed Camp X-Ray.

== Overview ==
Rebuilt in 1997, there are 33 flat and 2-story duplex housing units. The square-footage varies from 1197 to 1,250 square feet (116 m^{2}), depending on floor plan.

This neighborhood is reserved for the senior enlisted ranks (E-7 to E-9), company-grade officers, and civilian GS equivalent.
