= Darmstadt, Indiana =

- Town
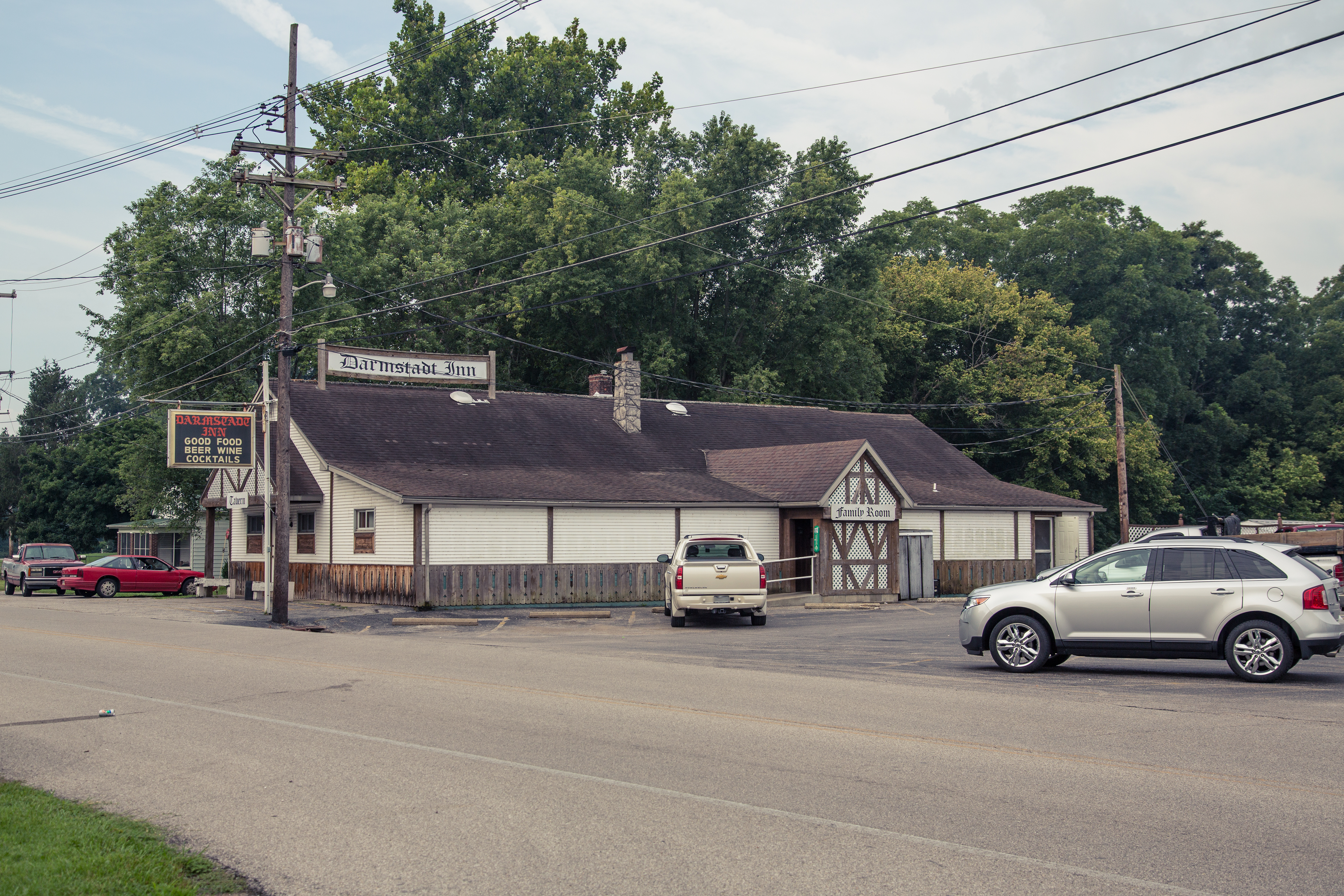

- Logo

- Location of Darmstadt in Vanderburgh County, Indiana.
- Coordinates: 38°5′28″N 87°34′34″W
- Country: United States
- State: Indiana
- County: Vanderburgh
- Townships: Scott, Armstrong, Center, German
- Established: 1822
- Named for: Darmstadt, Germany

Government
  - Type: Town Council

Area
  - Total: 4.58 sq mi (11.85 km^{2})
  - Land: 4.52 sq mi (11.70 km^{2})
  - Water: 0.058 sq mi (0.15 km^{2})
- Elevation: 479 ft (146 m)

Population (2020)
  - Total: 1,373
  - Density: 303.9/sq mi (117.4/km^{2})
- Time zone: UTC-6 (CST)
  - Summer (DST): UTC-5 (CDT)
- ZIP codes: 47720, 47725, 47710, 47618
- Area code: 812
- FIPS code: 18-16858
- GNIS feature ID: 2396680
- Website: www.darmstadt-indiana.org
- Addresses in Darmstadt are referred to as Darmstadt, IN there is an Inglefield, Indiana 47618 post office in Darmstadt that also has the Darmstadt, IN address

Darmstadt is a town located in Scott Township, Vanderburgh County, Indiana, United States. It also extends slightly into Armstrong, Center and German townships. The population was 1,373 at the 2020 census. Darmstadt, located just north of Evansville, is the only other incorporated municipality in Vanderburgh County besides Evansville, and is a part of the Evansville metropolitan area.

== History ==
On April 2, 2024, an EF-2 Tornado with peak winds of 115 mph passed through the vicinity of Darmstadt.

== Geography ==
Darmstadt is located at 38°5′28″N 87°34′34″W (38.091041, -87.576207).

According to the 2010 census, Darmstadt has a total area of 4.58 square miles (11.86 km^{2}), of which 4.52 square miles (11.71 km^{2}) (or 98.69%) is land and 0.06 square miles (0.16 km^{2}) (or 1.31%) is water.

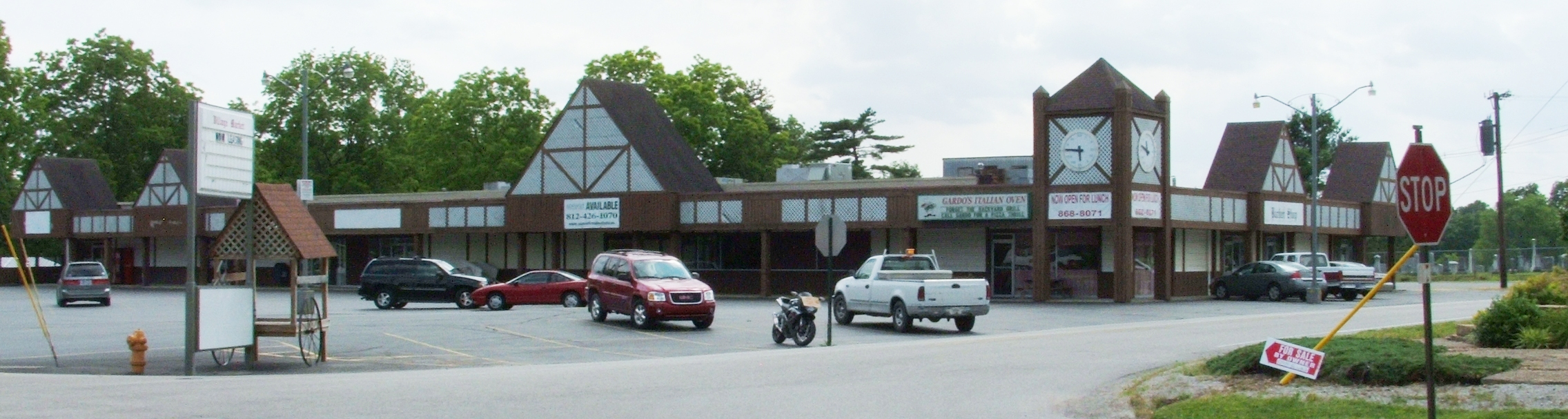
The Village Market in Darmstadt

== Demographics ==
Historical population
Census	Pop.	Note	%±
1880	150		—
1980	1,280		—
1990	1,346		5.2%
2000	1,313		−2.5%
2010	1,407		7.2%
2020	1,373		−2.4%
U.S. Decennial Census

=== 2020 census ===
As of the 2020 census, Darmstadt had a population of 1,373. The median age was 47.2 years. 21.6% of residents were under the age of 18 and 20.6% of residents were 65 years of age or older. For every 100 females, there were 107.4 males, and for every 100 females age 18 and over, there were 105.1 males age 18 and over.

0.0% of residents lived in urban areas, while 100.0% lived in rural areas.

There were 522 households in Darmstadt, of which 31.6% had children under the age of 18 living in them. Of all households, 69.2% were married-couple households, 13.2% were households with a male householder and no spouse or partner present, and 12.5% were households with a female householder and no spouse or partner present. About 18.1% of all households were made up of individuals, and 7.9% had someone living alone who was 65 years of age or older.

There were 558 housing units, of which 6.5% were vacant. The homeowner vacancy rate was 1.2% and the rental vacancy rate was 14.3%.

Racial composition as of the 2020 census
Race	Number	Percent
White	1,310	95.4%
Black or African American	8	0.6%
American Indian and Alaska Native	1	0.1%
Asian	11	0.8%
Native Hawaiian and Other Pacific Islander	0	0.0%
Some other race	5	0.4%
Two or more races	38	2.8%
Hispanic or Latino (of any race)	11	0.8%

=== 2010 census ===
As of the census of 2010, there were 1,407 people, 544 households, and 441 families living in the town. The population density was 311.3 inhabitants per square mile (120.2/km^{2}). There were 564 housing units at an average density of 124.8 per square mile (48.2/km^{2}). The racial makeup of the town was 97.5% White, 0.6% African American, 0.8% Asian, 0.1% Pacific Islander, 0.3% from other races, and 0.8% from two or more races. Hispanic or Latino of any race were 0.6% of the population.

There were 544 households, of which 30.1% had children under the age of 18 living with them, 72.2% were married couples living together, 5.5% had a female householder with no husband present, 3.3% had a male householder with no wife present, and 18.9% were non-families. 15.6% of all households were made up of individuals, and 7.5% had someone living alone who was 65 years of age or older. The average household size was 2.59 and the average family size was 2.88.

The median age in the town was 47.1 years. 21.3% of residents were under the age of 18; 6.1% were between the ages of 18 and 24; 18.8% were from 25 to 44; 36.6% were from 45 to 64; and 17% were 65 years of age or older. The gender makeup of the town was 51.5% male and 48.5% female.

=== 2000 census ===
As of the census of 2000, there were 1,313 people, 490 households, and 605 families living in the town. The population density was 262.1 inhabitants per square mile (101.2/km^{2}). There were 503 housing units at an average density of 106.6 per square mile (41.2/km^{2}). The racial makeup of the town was 99.16% White, 0.23% African American, 0.15% Asian, and 0.46% from two or more races. Hispanic or Latino of any race were 0.08% of the population.

There were 490 households, out of which 34.3% had children under the age of 18 living with them, 76.3% were married couples living together, 4.3% had a female householder with no husband present, and 17.3% were non-families. 15.3% of all households were made up of individuals, and 9.4% had someone living alone who was 65 years of age or older. The average household size was 2.68 and the average family size was 2.97.

In the town, the population was spread out, with 25.5% under the age of 18, 5.3% from 18 to 24, 24.7% from 25 to 44, 29.0% from 45 to 64, and 15.5% who were 65 years of age or older. The median age was 43 years. For every 100 females, there were 98.3 males. For every 100 females age 18 and over, there were 98.4 males.

The median income for a household in the town was $68,359, and the median income for a family was $72,813. Males had a median income of $50,605 versus $28,750 for females. The per capita income for the town was $31,898. About 0.5% of families and 1.1% of the population were below the poverty line, including none of those under age 18 and 1.0% of those age 65 or over.

== Transportation ==
Darmstadt is served by a number of different transportation methods. The major roads in Darmstadt include Darmstadt Road, Saint Joseph Avenue, and Boonville-New Harmony Road. Darmstadt Road and Saint Joseph Avenue provide direct access to Evansville, and Boonville-New Harmony Road runs directly by the shopping center, providing links to both Boonville and New Harmony.

U.S. 41 runs north-to-south directly east of Darmstadt, providing yet another access point to Evansville, as well as quick access to I-64.

== See also ==
World Peace Tree, a historically significant tree in Darmstadt
