= Melody Hill, Indiana =

- Census-designated place
- Location of Melody Hill in Vanderburgh County, Indiana.
- Coordinates: 38°01′26″N 87°30′43″W
- Country: United States
- State: Indiana
- County: Vanderburgh
- Township: Center

Area
  - Total: 1.39 sq mi (3.59 km^{2})
  - Land: 1.37 sq mi (3.54 km^{2})
  - Water: 0.015 sq mi (0.04 km^{2})
- Elevation: 407 ft (124 m)

Population (2020)
  - Total: 3,689
  - Density: 2,695.9/sq mi (1,040.91/km^{2})
- Time zone: UTC-6 (Central (CST))
  - Summer (DST): UTC-5 (CDT)
- ZIP code: 47711
- Area code: 812
- FIPS code: 18-48330
- GNIS feature ID: 2393124

Melody Hill is a census-designated place (CDP) in Center Township, Vanderburgh County, in the U.S. state of Indiana. As of the 2020 census, Melody Hill had a population of 3,689.

== Geography ==
According to the United States Census Bureau, the CDP has a total area of 1.4 square miles (3.6 km^{2}), of which 1.4 square miles (3.6 km^{2}) is land and 0.73% is water. The Census Bureau-created CDP of "Melody Hill" consists of the residential areas south of the Evansville Regional Airport, north of Lynch Road, west of Green River Road, and east of the industrial area that includes Whirlpool (the industrial plants are not included as they are in the Evansville city limits.). Melody Hill includes older subdivisions such as Melody Hills, Cloverlawn Estates, Ridgeview Estates, and the Bergdolt Rd. area, as well as several newer subdivisions.

== School districts ==
This area, originally part of the Vanderburgh County School Corporation, was served beginning in the mid-1870s by Center Township School #7 (Hooker School, at Oak Hill and Whetstone Rds.) and Center Township School #4 (originally at Oak Hill and Bergdolt Rds, then moved to Oak Hill and Lynch Rds. and named "Lynch School"). In 1918, Hooker School, along with two other schools, was consolidated into McCutchanville School and closed, while Lynch School continued to serve a small part of the district. In 1944, a local resident remembered walking six miles each way as a child between McCutchanville School and his home on what is now Hitch-Peters Rd. From 1948 to 1957, Lynch and McCutchanville Schools were combined into one district, with students in grades 1 and 2 attending Lynch and grades 3 to 8 attending McCutchanville. The new Oak Hill School was opened in 1957 for grades 1 to 5, with grades 6 to 8 attending McCutchanville School (Lynch School was re-purposed for disabled students). The Oak Hill School 1966 upper grades addition opened the school to all students in grades K to 8, and McCutchanville School was closed.

From 1966 to 1984, all students north of Lynch Road and west of the Vanderburgh/Warrick county line, in an area extending halfway into McCutchanville to the north, attended Oak Hill Elementary School (grades K–8) and North High School. This included the entirety of current-day "Melody Hill". With the 1984 EVSC middle school redistricting plan, Melody Hill was split along St. George Rd. between two elementary districts (Vogel and Scott) for grades K–5, with older grades attending Oak Hill Middle School and North High School. In 2011, following the construction of the new North High School (grades 9–12) and North Junior High School (grades 7–8), Oak Hill again became an elementary school (grades K–6), but students south of St. George Rd. continued at Vogel Elementary (grades K–6).

In response to explosive population growth in the area, which was straining resources at Scott and Oak Hill schools, a new McCutchanville school (grades K–6) was opened in 2018.

== "Melody Hills" subdivisions ==
To residents, "Melody Hills" (note the "s") consists only of the two neighborhoods off St. George Road between U.S. Route 41 and Oak Hill Road. The older section, south of St. George Rd., consists of smaller tract homes built in the postwar era to house workers at the Whirlpool plant. The newer section, consisting of larger homes built on a hilly area in the 1960s, is on the north side of St. George Road between Ward Road on the east and Twickingham Road on the west. It is south of the Evansville Regional Airport and east of the Sunset Memorial Gardens cemetery. To its east is the "Knob Hill" area, one street of homes around a lake and small hill.

== Demographics ==
Historical population
Census	Pop.	Note	%±
2020	3,689		—
U.S. Decennial Census

=== 2020 census ===
As of the 2020 census, Melody Hill had a population of 3,689. The median age was 40.8 years. 23.8% of residents were under the age of 18 and 19.2% of residents were 65 years of age or older. For every 100 females there were 95.0 males, and for every 100 females age 18 and over there were 91.3 males age 18 and over.

100.0% of residents lived in urban areas, while 0.0% lived in rural areas.

There were 1,443 households in Melody Hill, of which 33.4% had children under the age of 18 living in them. Of all households, 59.6% were married-couple households, 13.9% were households with a male householder and no spouse or partner present, and 21.7% were households with a female householder and no spouse or partner present. About 20.5% of all households were made up of individuals and 10.8% had someone living alone who was 65 years of age or older.

There were 1,489 housing units, of which 3.1% were vacant. The homeowner vacancy rate was 0.7% and the rental vacancy rate was 9.1%.

Racial composition as of the 2020 census
Race	Number	Percent
White	3,264	88.5%
Black or African American	147	4.0%
American Indian and Alaska Native	6	0.2%
Asian	46	1.2%
Native Hawaiian and Other Pacific Islander	1	0.0%
Some other race	29	0.8%
Two or more races	196	5.3%
Hispanic or Latino (of any race)	91	2.5%

=== 2000 census ===
As of the census of 2000, there were 3,066 people, 1,159 households, and 935 families residing in the CDP. The population density was 2,252.0 inhabitants per square mile (869.5/km^{2}). There were 1,193 housing units at an average density of 876.3 per square mile (338.3/km^{2}). The racial makeup of the CDP was 97.23% White, 1.57% African American, 0.20% Native American, 0.49% Asian, 0.16% from other races, and 0.36% from two or more races. Hispanic or Latino of any race were 0.68% of the population.

There were 1,159 households, out of which 35.5% had children under the age of 18 living with them, 72.0% were married couples living together, 6.6% had a female householder with no husband present, and 19.3% were non-families. 16.7% of all households were made up of individuals, and 9.0% had someone living alone who was 65 years of age or older. The average household size was 2.64 and the average family size was 2.97.

In the CDP, the population was spread out, with 26.1% under the age of 18, 5.2% from 18 to 24, 27.9% from 25 to 44, 25.0% from 45 to 64, and 15.9% who were 65 years of age or older. The median age was 40 years. For every 100 females, there were 95.0 males. For every 100 females age 18 and over, there were 92.0 males.

The median income for a household in the CDP was $60,764, and the median income for a family was $62,000. Males had a median income of $43,553 versus $25,850 for females. The per capita income for the CDP was $23,880. About 0.9% of families and 1.1% of the population were below the poverty line, including 1.0% of those under age 18 and 0.9% of those age 65 or over.
