= Handly's Lessee v. Anthony =

- Supreme Court of the United States

Decided March 14, 1820
- Full case name: Handly's Lessee v. Anthony
- Citations: 18 U.S. 374 (more) 5 Wheat. 374; 5 L. Ed. 113; 1820 U.S. LEXIS 262

Case history
- Prior: On appeal from the Circuit Court of the United States for the District of Kentucky

Holding
- Where a river is said to be the boundary between two states, the boundary properly extended to the low water mark of the opposite shore and no higher; plaintiff's motion of ejectment based on title granted by the state of Kentucky was denied.

Court membership
- Chief Justice John Marshall Associate Justices Bushrod Washington · William Johnson; H. Brockholst Livingston · Thomas Todd; Gabriel Duvall · Joseph Story

Case opinion
- Majority: Marshall

Handly's Lessee v. Anthony, 18 U.S. (5 Wheat.) 374 (1820), is a ruling by the Supreme Court of the United States which held that the proper boundary between the states of Indiana and Kentucky was the low-water mark on the western and northwestern bank of the Ohio River. Motion by the plaintiff, Handly's lessee, to eject inhabitants of a peninsula in the Ohio River (which was at times temporarily cut off from Indiana by high water) was denied.

== Background ==
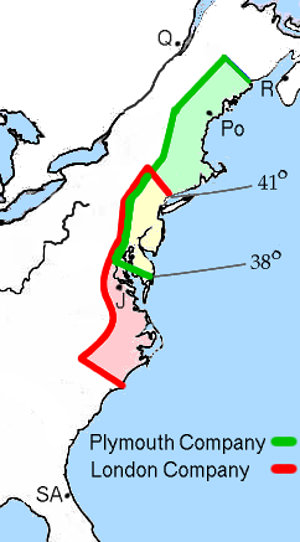
Map of North America c. 1606, depicting original land grants given to the Virginia Company.

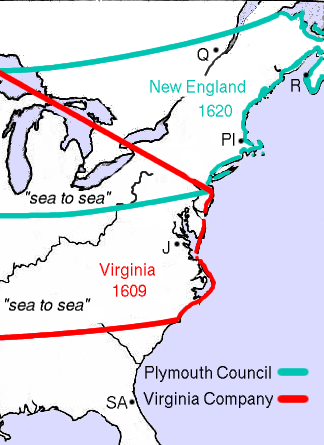
Map of North America c. 1609, depicting land grants given to the Virginia Company.

In 1606, shortly before colonization began, James I of England granted the Charter of 1606 to the newly established Virginia Company, asserting royal title to Native American-occupied land between the 34th and 45th parallels of latitude and 100 miles (160 km) inland, and permitting the Virginia Company to establish colonies there. The Virginia Company's subsidiary, the Plymouth Company, was given title to land between the 38th and 45th parallel, while another subsidiary, the London Company, was given title to land between the 34th and 41st parallels. The charter created a conflicting title to the overlapping area between the 38th and 41st parallels, but since no colonies were planned for the area the conflict did not initially create problems. In 1609, James I redefined the Colony of Virginia's boundaries so that the northern boundary projected northwest from the coast, as well as asserting title to all land west to the Pacific Ocean.

Conflicting land claims as well as claims that land grants extended to the Pacific Ocean proved highly contentious issues after the American Revolution. To help resolve the issue, in 1781 Virginia agreed to surrender to the United States federal government all title to its land claims west of the Ohio River. In making its cession, Virginia defined as its border the Ohio River, and required that Congress use the river as a border between the nascent state of Kentucky and any states fashioned out of the unsettled territory to the north. Title was transferred in 1784, and the United States Congress passed the Land Ordinance of 1784, Land Ordinance of 1785, and the Northwest Ordinance of 1787 to turn these lands into territories and (eventually) states. The Northwest Ordinance created the Northwest Territory, which encompassed the modern states of Illinois, Indiana, Ohio, Michigan, Wisconsin, and a portion of Minnesota. Kentucky remained unorganized, but its statehood was considered imminent. After 10 constitutional conventions and three statehood enabling acts passed by the Virginia legislature, Kentucky was admitted as a state on June 1, 1792. In preparation for Ohio statehood, the area encompassed by the modern state of Ohio was separated from the Northwest Territory on July 4, 1800, and the remaining territory renamed the Indiana Territory. The area that is now the modern state of Michigan was separated from the Indiana Territory in 1805 and incorporated as the Territory of Michigan. But with settlement of the area rapidly increasing, the area comprising the modern state of Indiana was reorganized in 1809 as the "Indiana Territory," with the remainder of the old Indiana Territory to the west organized as the Territory of Illinois. Indiana was admitted to statehood on December 9, 1816.

The Ohio River forms the border between Indiana and Kentucky. At one point, the westward-flowing Ohio River formed a sharp meander, and across the narrowest point of the neck of land ran a dry channel that filled with water only when the river was about 10 feet (3.0 m) above flood stage. Two creeks emptied this channel (flowing northwest), and two other creeks ran eastward and westward along the channel to empty into the Ohio River. The peninsula formed by the meander was settled, and the individuals living there long believed themselves to be under the jurisdiction of the state of Indiana. On January 27, 1810, the state of Kentucky enacted legislation asserting title over the river bed and all islands in the river up to the northwest bank of the Ohio River. Consequently, Kentucky granted to Handly title to the peninsula in question. Handly subsequently leased this land to a tenant, who brought suit against Anthony, a citizen of Indiana who had been granted title to the land by that state. Handly's lessee sought to have Anthony ejected from the land.

The district court held for the defendant Anthony, and plaintiff Handly's lessee appealed to the U.S. Supreme Court.

== Decision ==
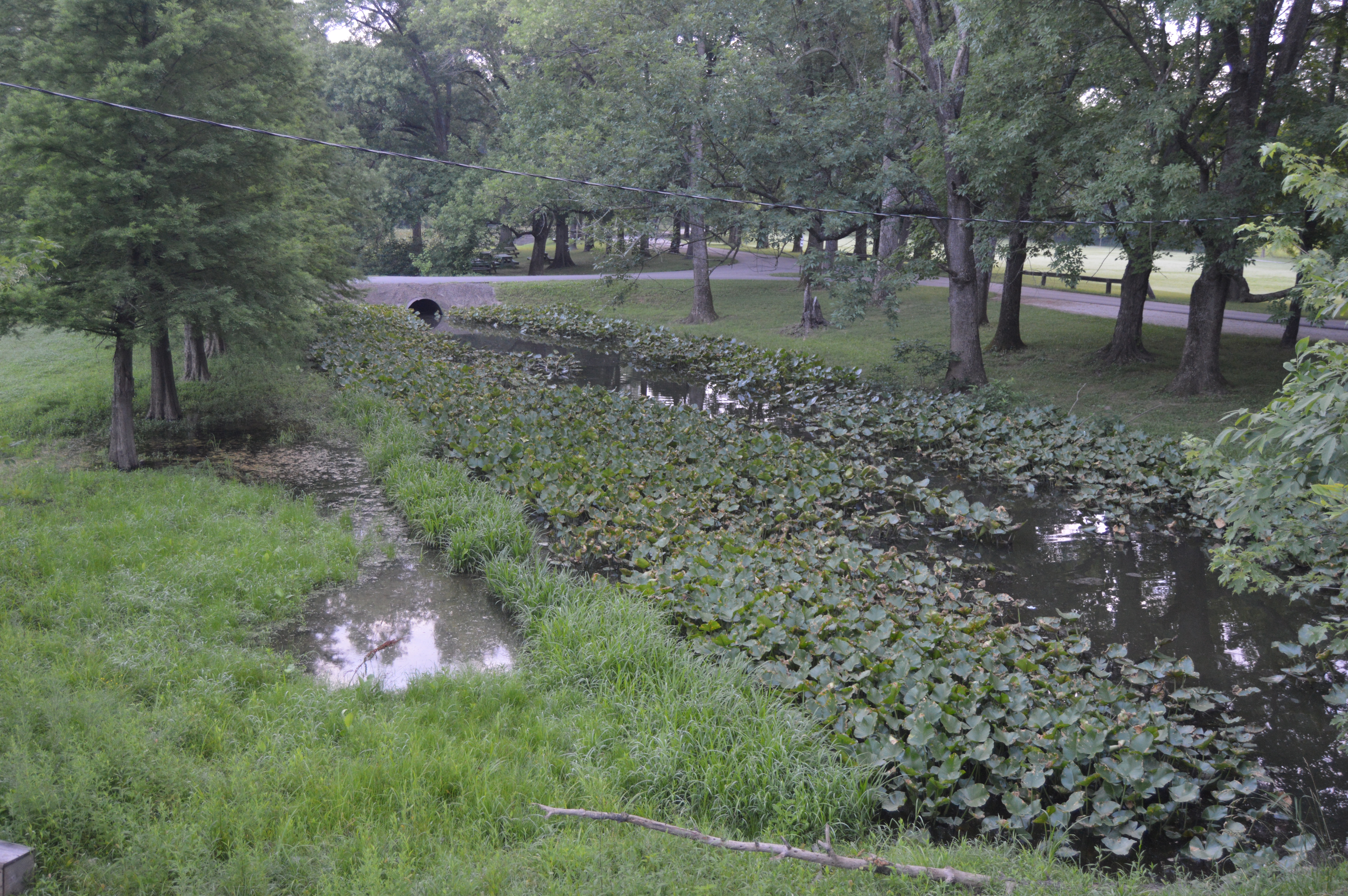
Overview of the Ohio River, as claimed by Kentucky

Map of the meander in question, now Union Township, Vanderburgh County, Indiana.

Chief Justice John Marshall delivered the opinion of the court.

Marshall first reviewed the facts of the case, including the various land grants of Virginia, the geography of the land in question, competing requests for instructions to the jury in the trial court, and the trial court's decision. The plaintiff had appealed on the basis of two questions: First, whether the land did, in fact, lie within the jurisdiction of Kentucky and, second, as to the trial court's instruction to the jury defining what the "river" constituted (e.g., did it include meanders). Marshall argued the two questions are essentially the same, and addressed them as such.

The issue was that Virginia's cession to the United States declared the river, not a bank of the river, to be the proper boundary. In a major statement about interstate boundaries, Marshall declared:

When a great river is the boundary between two nations or states, if the original property is in neither, and there be no convention respecting it, each holds to the middle of the stream. But when, as in this case, one State is the original proprietor, and grants the territory on one side only, it retains the river within its own domain, and the newly created State extends to the river only. The river, however, is its boundary.

It was well established, Marshall said, that the creation of new land on the Indiana side of the river would clearly belong to Indiana. But the issue in the instant case was land delineated by the ebb and flow of the river. "Common consent" and "common convenience," Marshall said, had long established that the low water mark was the border mark, for otherwise states and nations would find their jurisdiction expanding and contracting with the seasons and the tides.

Based on this fact, Virginia must have intended for the Ohio River itself to be the boundary between Indiana and Kentucky and not a strip of land which was subject to the rise and fall of the water levels. The majority refused to consider Kentucky's request that the Court define what constitutes an island, for not only was that request asking the Court to rule on a hypothetical question but to ask the Court to rule on an issue not based on the facts before it. Marshall noted that Kentucky itself had made this question moot in its Act of January 27, 1810, by asserting that the state's border only extended to the low-water mark of the northwestern side of the Ohio River (clearly limiting its claim only to that and not to land the river might cut off from Indiana during high water). This proved critical to the Court. Marshall concluded:

If a river, subject to tides, constituted the boundary of a State, and at flood the waters of the river flowed through a narrow channel, round an extensive body of land, but receded from that channel at ebb, so as to leave the land it surrounded at high water, connected with the main body of the country; this portion of territory would scarcely be considered as belonging to the State on the opposite side of the river, although that State should have the property of the river. The principle that a country bounded by a river extends to low water mark, a principle so natural, and of such obvious convenience as to have been generally adopted, would, we think, apply to that case. We perceive no sufficient reason why it should not apply to this.

Marshall admitted that the case involved highly complex, technical details. But "public convenience, and the avoidance of controversy... ought not to be defeated by those technical perplexities which may sometimes influence contracts between individuals." Marshall also briefly noted that the inhabitants of the peninsula had long been considered by both states to be citizens of Indiana, and the Court held that the recent disturbance of these assumptions should not hold as much weight as the longer-held views.

The judgment of the district court was affirmed, and the land held to belong to the state of Indiana.

== Assessment ==
Handly's Lessee v. Anthony is considered a key ruling in the law of borders. However, its utility in American case law today is not clear. In 1966, the state of Ohio sued Kentucky, seeking to have it granted joint jurisdiction over the Ohio River with Kentucky. In 1971, Ohio filed a motion to have the middle of the river set as the boundary. In Ohio v. Kentucky, 410 U.S. 641 (1973), the Supreme Court permitted Ohio to present its new materials, but nonetheless ruled against the state. Associate Justice William O. Douglas wrote a stinging dissent in which he argued the Court had improperly made a determination regarding the law of demurrer. Ohio continued to pursue its suit, and in Ohio v. Kentucky, 444 U.S. 335 (1980) the Supreme Court largely disregarded the decision in Handly's Lessee regarding accretion of new land and held that 1792 low-water mark was the only correct boundary between the two states (giving Kentucky part of the Ohio River shoreline on the north side of the Ohio River).

== Bibliography ==
- Ayers, Edward L.; Gould, Lewis L.; Oshinsky, David M.; and Soderland, Jean R. American Passages: A History of the United States. Boston, Mass.: Wadsworth/Cengage Learning, 2009.
- Esarey, Logan. A History of Indiana From Its Exploration to 1850. Indianapolis: W.K. Stewart Co., 1915.
- Harrison, Lowell Hayes. Kentucky's Road to Statehood. Lexington, Ky.: University Press of Kentucky, 1992.
- Hubbard, Bill. American Boundaries: The Nation, the States, the Rectangular Survey. Chicago: University of Chicago Press, 2009.
- Miller, Robert J. Native America, Discovered and Conquered: Thomas Jefferson, Lewis & Clark, and Manifest Destiny. Westport, Conn.: Praeger Publishers, 2006.
- Utley, Henry M.; Cutcheon, Byron M.; and Burton, Clarence Monreo. Michigan as a Province, Territory and State. New York: Publishing Society of Michigan, 1906.
- Zimmerman, Joseph F. Interstate Disputes: The Supreme Court's Original Jurisdiction. Albany, N.Y.: State University of New York Press, 2007.
