= Perry Township, Vanderburgh County, Indiana =

Perry Township Vanderburgh County
- Township
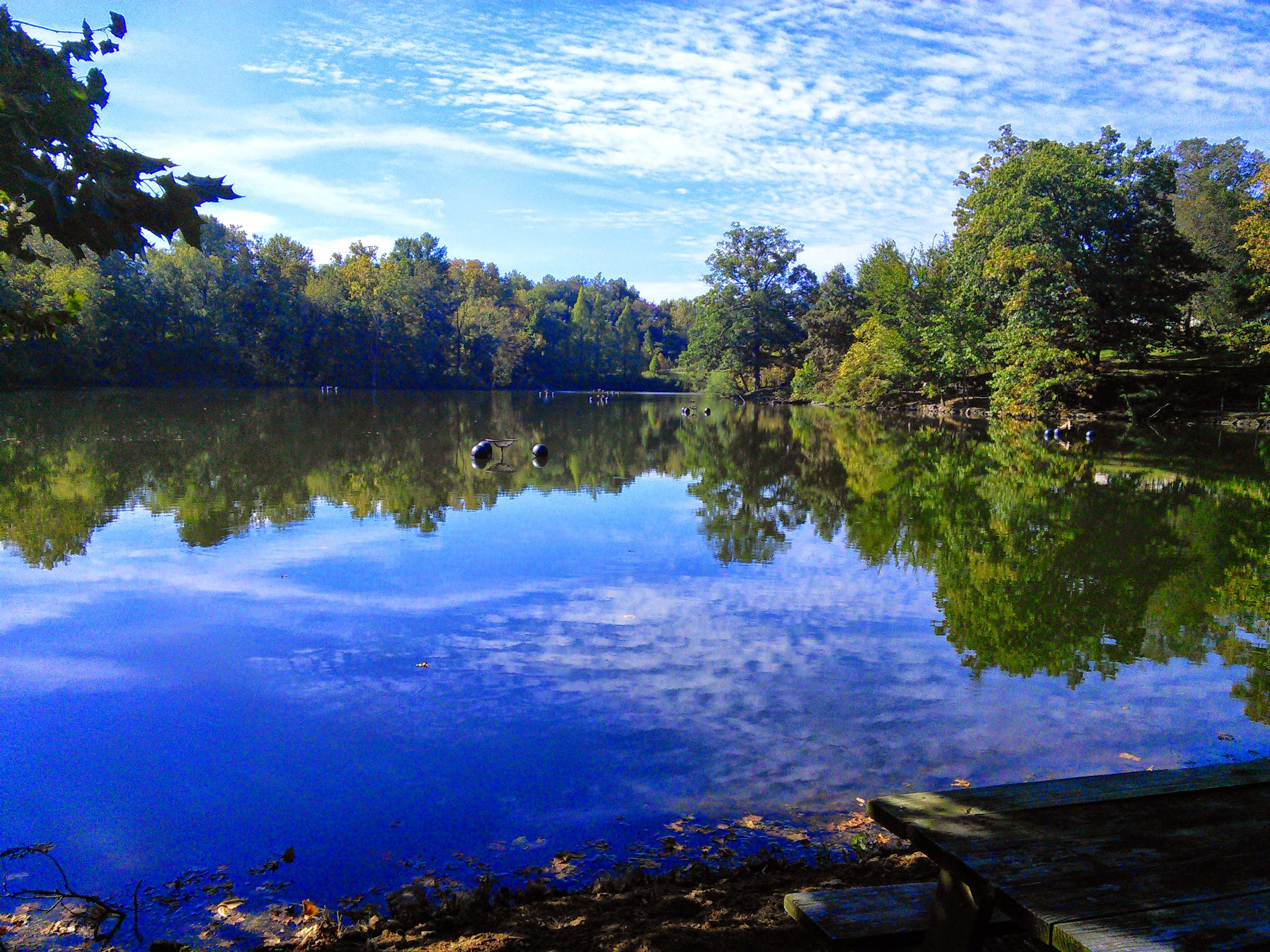
- Lake Victoria, in the Mesker Park Zoo, located in Perry Township

- Location in Vanderburgh County
- Coordinates: 37°58′17″N 87°39′25″W
- Country: United States
- State: Indiana
- County: Vanderburgh

Government
  - Type: Indiana township

Area
  - Total: 28.21 sq mi (73.1 km^{2})
  - Land: 27.78 sq mi (71.9 km^{2})
  - Water: 0.43 sq mi (1.1 km^{2}) 1.52%
- Elevation: 460 ft (140 m)

Population (2020)
  - Total: 24,239
  - Density: 903.4/sq mi (348.8/km^{2})
- ZIP codes: 47712, 47720
- GNIS feature ID: 453726
- Website: perrytown.org

Perry Township is one of eight townships in Vanderburgh County, Indiana, United States. A portion of the township is located within the city limits of Evansville, the third largest city in Indiana.

Organized in 1840, Perry Township has a land area of 27.8 square miles. It includes the University of Southern Indiana, Mesker Park Zoo and Botanic Garden, Burdette Park and Howell Wetlands.

== Township Trustee's Office ==
The Perry Township Trustee's Office is managed by an elected Trustee and an elected Advisory Board, which serves as an oversight committee. The Trustee's Office provides financial assistance to Perry Township residents in need and manages emergency fire services for all township residents.

== Township Data ==
Total population: 24,239

Total households: 10,071

Total housing units: 10,799

Median household income: $66,340

Education (bachelor's degree or higher): 29.3%

Employment rate: 61.4%

Without health insurance: 5.7%

== Township Political Districts ==
- Congressional 8th District
- State House District 76
- State Senate District 49
