= Alhambra Theatorium =

- U.S. National Register of Historic Places
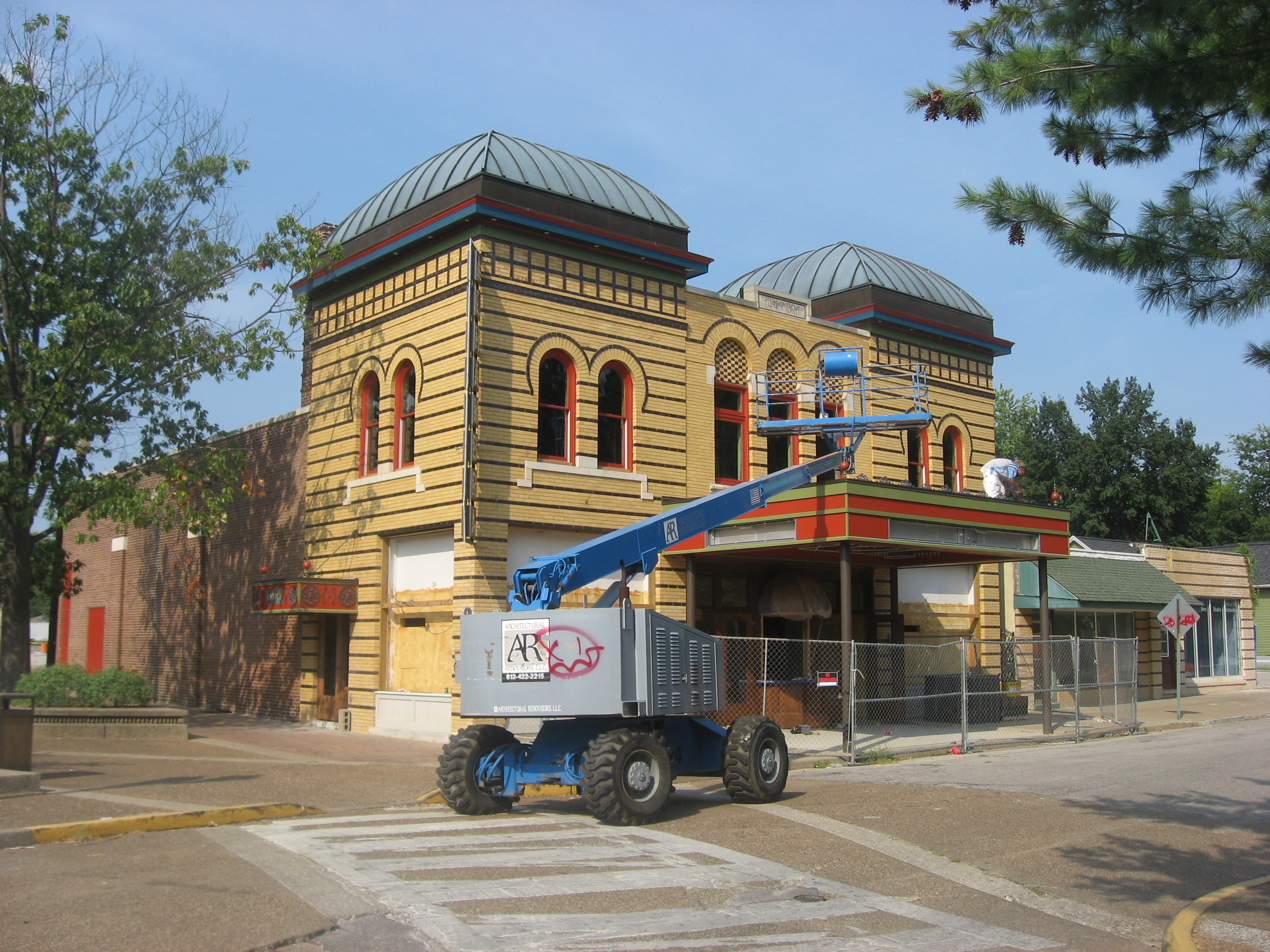
- A view of the theater under construction
- Location: 50 Adams Ave., Evansville, Indiana
- Coordinates: 37°57′44″N 87°33′57″W
- Area: less than one acre
- Built: 1913
- Architect: Frank J. Schlotter
- Architectural style: Moorish
- NRHP reference No.: 79000047
- Added to NRHP: October 1, 1979

Alhambra Theatorium (also known as The Alhambra Theater) is a historic movie theater in the Haynies Corner Arts District of Evansville, Indiana. It was designed by Frank J. Schlotter and opened on September 27, 1913, as a movie theater. The Alhambra was one of many influenced by the Alhambra Palace in Spain. Although Alhambra theatres opened all over the world, only a traditional playhouse built in New York in 1905 predates Evansville's in the United States.

The theatre cost $18,000 to build and was one of the largest movie theatres in Evansville at the time. It included a cigar shop and a confectionery, and spurred new business in the area now designated as the Haynies Corner Arts District. The theater ceased operation in 1956.

The Alhambra has been renovated a few times in the past 100 years and is in the process of being restored. It was placed on the National Register of Historic Places in 1979.
