= Evansville High School =

Evansville High School may refer to:

- Evansville High School (Wisconsin)
- Evansville High School (Minnesota)

Several schools in Evansville, Indiana:

- Benjamin Bosse High School
- Central High School
- William Henry Harrison High School
- North High School
- Francis Joseph Reitz High School
- Mater Dei High School
- Francis Joseph Reitz Memorial High School
- Evansville Day School
- Evansville Signature School
