= Garty =

Surname list

Garty is a surname. Notable people with the surname include:

- John Garty (1864–1897), New Zealand cricketer
- Netta Garty (born 1980), Israeli actress

== See also ==
- Gary (given name)
- McGarty
