= McGarty =

Surname list

McGarty is a surname. Notable people with the surname include:

- Packy McGarty (1933–2021), Gaelic footballer
- Shona McGarty (born 1991), English actress and singer

== See also ==
- Garty
- McGarry
- McGary
