= Karges =

Karges is a surname. Notable people with the surname include:

- Carlo Karges (1951–2002), German musician
- Wilhelm Karges (1613/1614–1699), German organist and composer

== See also ==
- William A. Karges Fine Art
- Karges Furniture
