= Hugh McGary Jr. =

Founder of Evansville, Indiana

Hugh McGary Jr. was the founder of Evansville, Indiana.

== The Founding of Evansville, Indiana ==
On March 27, 1812, Hugh McGary Jr. purchased about 441 acres and named it "McGary's Landing". In 1814, to attract more people, McGary renamed his village "Evansville" in honor of Colonel Robert Morgan Evans. Evansville incorporated in 1817 and became a county seat on January 7, 1818.
