= Germania Männerchor Volksfest =

Cultural event in Evansville, Indiana

The Germania Maennerchor Volksfest is an annual German heritage festival that takes place each August in Evansville, Indiana, United States.

== History ==
The festival is run by the Germania Maennerchor, which is a social and singing club founded in 1900 by Evansville area immigrants from Germany. The first Volksfest was held in 1934. It was discontinued in 1941 when patriotic feelings stirred by World War II turned public opinion against anything of German culture. It was revived in 1962 as part of Evansville's sesquicentennial celebration.

The August festival lasts over the course of 3 days and consists of German food, drink, dance, and music. Many attendees dress in old world German apparel . The festival also utilizes the historic Germania Mannerchor building which is complete with a Rathskeller, Festhalle. and outdoor beer garden.

The festival went on hiatus in 2020, but was restored the next year.

== See also ==
Mt. Angel, Oregon

Leavenworth, Washington

Frankenmuth, Michigan
