= McGary =

McGary is a surname. Notable people with the surname include:

- Austin McGary (1846–1928), American sheriff and evangelist
- Ethel McGary (1907–1975), American freestyle swimmer
- Hugh McGary (1744–1806), Irish-American pioneer and slave owner
- Hugh McGary Jr., American city founder
- Kaleb McGary (born 1995), American football player
- Mitch McGary (born 1992), American basketball player

== See also ==
- McGary Islands
