= Culver Historic District =

Historic district in Indiana, United States

- U.S. National Register of Historic Places
- U.S. Historic district
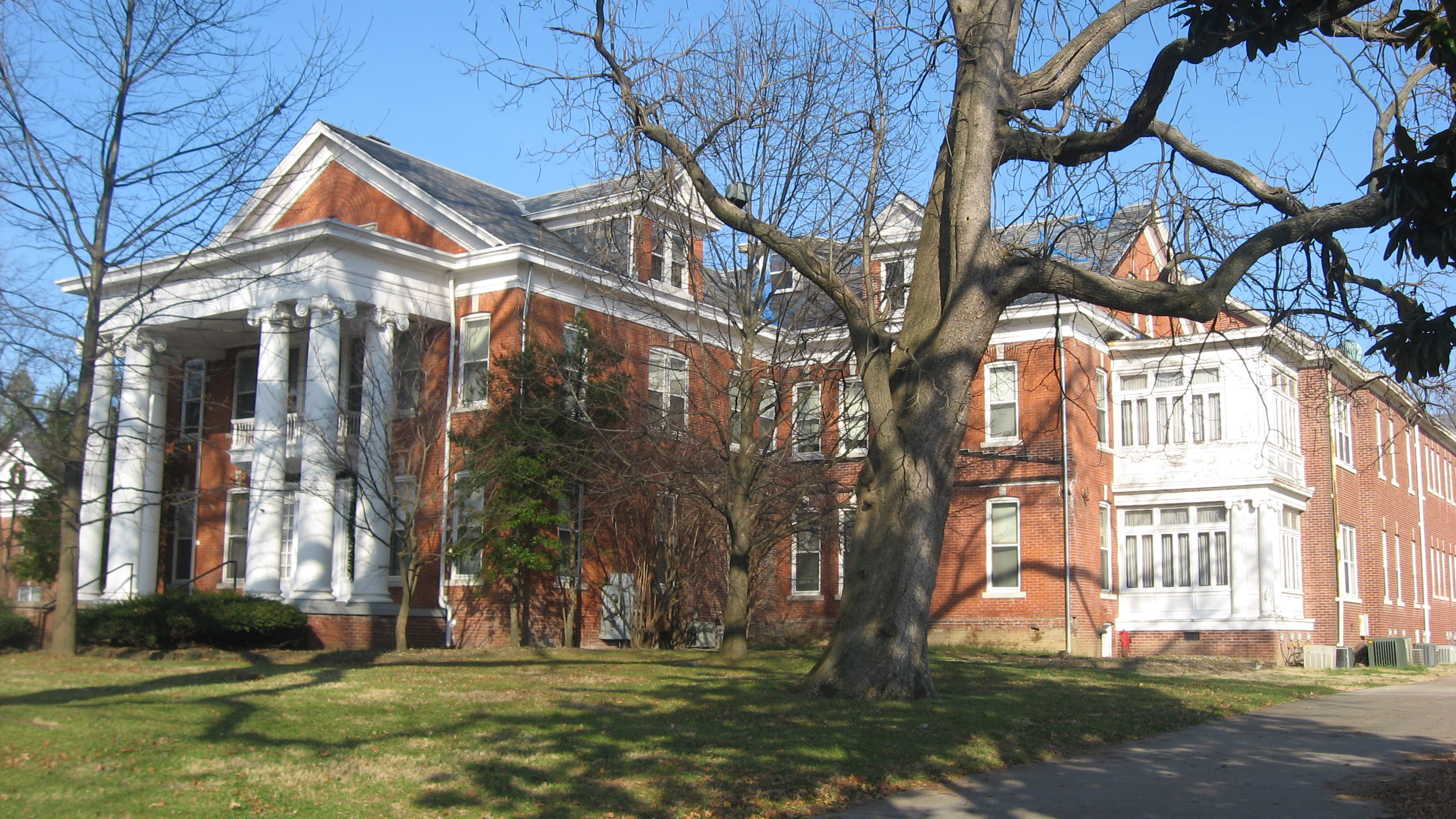
- Rathbone Home

- Location within Indiana Location within the United States
- Location: Roughly bounded by Madison Ave., Riverside Dr., and Emmett and Venice Sts., Evansville, Indiana
- Coordinates: 37°57′13″N 87°33′52″W
- Area: 22.8 acres (9.2 ha)
- Built: 1890
- Architect: Multiple
- Architectural style: Bungalow/craftsman, Queen Anne, Prairie Style, Colonial Revival, Italianate
- NRHP reference No.: 84001691
- Added to NRHP: June 1, 1984

Culver Historic District is a national historic district located at Evansville, Indiana. The neighborhood is all residential, and unlike most of the rest of the city, the lots are not laid out on a grid. Most of the houses are on a lot previously part of the farm owned by Robert Parrett, a native of England who settled in Evansville and built a house near the intersection of Madison Avenue and Parrett Street. Eventually Robert Parrett would become the first Methodist minister in Evansville and helped found Trinity Methodist church, which he served until his death in 1860. His heirs divided up the plat in 1863.

The architectural style of the houses in the neighborhood include Queen Anne, Bungalow, Italianate, Prairie School, Tudor, Colonial Revival, and Four-square. The Rathbone Memorial Home is the focal point of the neighborhood. Completed in 1905, it was formed as a residential facility for poor elderly women and remains today as a nursing home for the elderly.

It was listed on the National Register of Historic Places in 1984.
