= Washington Avenue Historic District (Evansville, Indiana) =

Historic district in Indiana, United States

- U.S. National Register of Historic Places
- U.S. Historic district
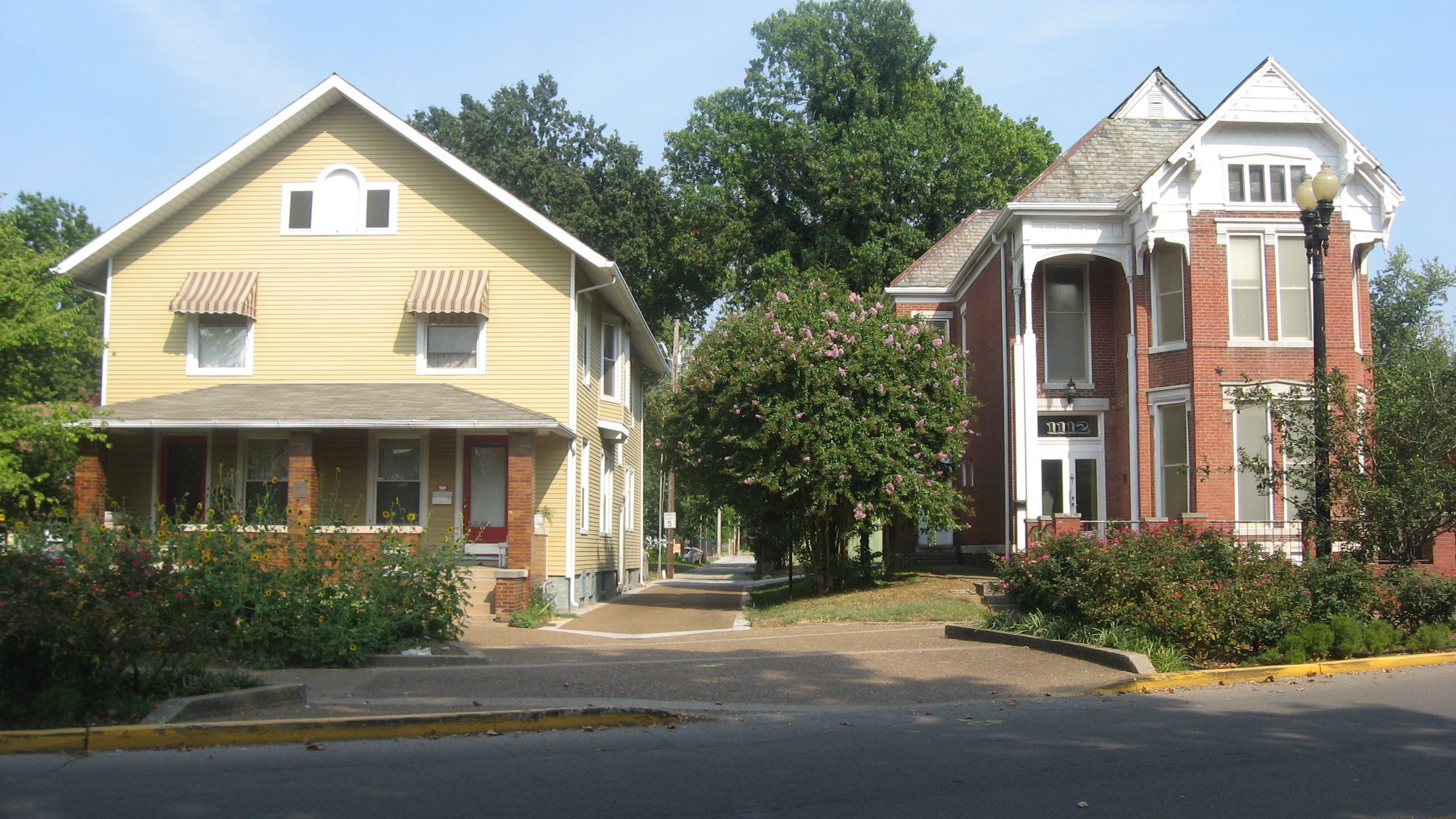
- Houses in the district

- Location within Indiana Location within the United States
- Location: Roughly bounded by Madison and Grand Aves., E. Gum and Parret Sts., Evansville, Indiana
- Coordinates: 37°57′51″N 87°33′27″W
- Built: 1880
- Architect: Multiple
- Architectural style: Italianate, Queen Anne, Stick Style
- NRHP reference No.: 80000073
- Added to NRHP: November 28, 1980

Washington Avenue Historic District is a national historic district located at Evansville, Indiana. It was listed on the National Register of Historic Places in 1980.
