= Wesselman Woods Nature Preserve =

Nature preserve in Evansville, Indiana, US

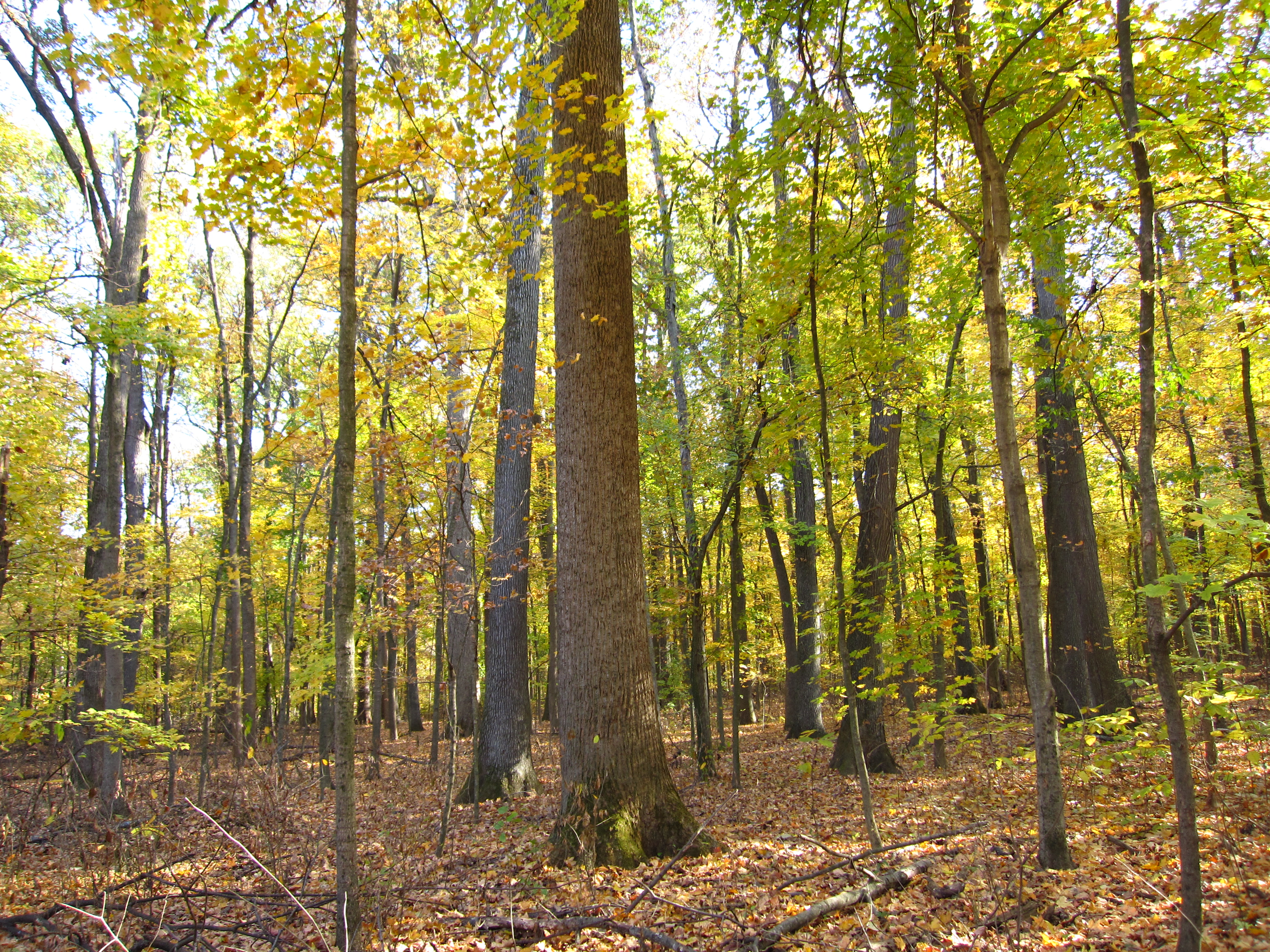
- Wesselman Woods Nature Preserve, November 2010

- Location within Indiana Location within the United States
- Location: Evansville, Indiana
- Coordinates: 37°59′05″N 87°30′23″W
- Area: 240 acres (0.97 km^{2})

U.S. National Natural Landmark
- Designated: 1973

Wesselman Woods Nature Preserve is a 240-acre (0.97 km^{2}) nature preserve located in Evansville, Indiana. It is a National Natural Landmark and a State Nature Preserve owned by the City of Evansville and operated by the non-profit Wesselman Nature Society.

The preserve consists of over 190 acres (0.77 km^{2}) of virgin bottomland hardwood forest complemented by an additional 50 acres (200,000 m^{2}) of younger forest, field, and pond. The woods consist of sweetgum, sugar maple, tulip tree, Shumard oak, and green ash throughout. It is the largest tract of virgin forest located inside any city limits in the United States.

The oldest trees are over 400 years old. Among the largest of their species are 24 state champions and two county champions. One of the tallest trees in the state is a tulip tree located within the park. It is 147 feet (45 m) tall with a 13.2-foot (4.0 m) circumference and 81-foot (25 m) canopy.

Animal species include squirrels, raccoons, gray foxes, coyote, and whitetail deer. The woods also serves as a refuge for a variety of woodpeckers and owls.

A nature center welcomes visitors with interactive exhibits, animals, special events, wildlife observation areas, educational programs, summer camps, and a 5-acre (0.020 km^{2}) nature playscape. The woods offer a variety of hiking trails of varying distances. The amphitheater near Odonata Pond may also be rented for outdoor activities.

The Wesselman Nature Society also manages Howell Wetlands, a 23-acre (93,000 m^{2}) wetlands property located at 1400 S. Tekoppel Avenue in the urban western area of Evansville.

== The Wandering Owl ==
The Wandering Owl was an annual fall fundraiser held from 2009 to 2024 in Wesselman Woods with all proceeds going towards Wesselman Woods. It was a 21-and-older event that features food, beer, wine, and live acoustic music, supported by local businesses.

== UE land sale controversy ==
Under the leadership of UE President Christopher Pietruszkiewicz and the Board of Trustees, the University of Evansville (UE) faced significant criticism from the Evansville community over its handling of the sale of approximately 42 acres of land near Wesselman Woods. In January 2019, UE announced plans to sell this off-campus property to fund the construction of a new campus health and wellness center. This proposal alarmed supporters of Wesselman Woods Nature Preserve, who feared that selling the land for commercial development would remove a valuable buffer zone between urban development and the preserve's old-growth forest, potentially harming its delicate ecosystem. Critics accused the administration of prioritizing financial gain over environmental and community concerns, which further damaged the university's reputation.

The university's lack of transparency throughout the process exacerbated tensions with the community. Despite widespread interest in ensuring the land's preservation, UE proceeded with legislative efforts to remove use restrictions on the land without adequately informing or consulting local stakeholders, including the Wesselman Nature Society. Meetings regarding the property were held without sufficient public input, leaving conservationists and local advocates feeling excluded and unheard. Additionally, the administration delayed negotiations with Wesselman Woods while continuing to explore potentially more lucrative commercial opportunities, raising concerns about their true intentions. Ultimately, after years of criticism and public pressure, UE sold the property to Wesselman Woods in 2023 for $2 million, a decision viewed as overdue and emblematic of a prolonged disregard for community priorities.
