= Robert Morgan Evans =

American politician

General Robert Morgan Evans
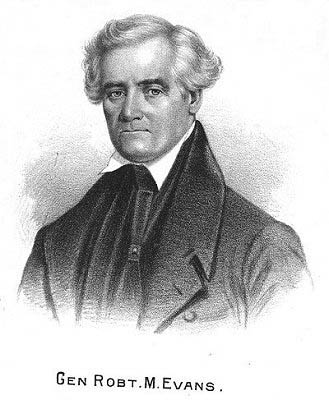
- Evans c. 1889

10th Speaker of the Indiana House of Representatives
- In office December 5, 1825 – December 4, 1826
- Preceded by: Stephen Stevens
- Succeeded by: Harbin H. Moore

Personal details
- Born: February 17, 1782 Frederick County, Virginia, United States
- Died: December 14, 1842 (aged 60)

General Robert Morgan Evans (February 17, 1782 – December 14, 1842) was born in Frederick County, Virginia. In 1803 in the town of Paris, Kentucky, he was married to Jane Trimble, a sister of Judge Robert Trimble of the Supreme Court of the United States. Evans, for whom Evansville, Indiana is named, did not actually found the city, but his influence played a role in determining the future of the town. He was the tenth Speaker of the Indiana House of Representatives.

At the age of 22, he moved to Indiana Territory in what was then Knox County about two miles north of present-day Princeton in Gibson County. He settled in the wilderness and at the first sale of public lands in 1807, bought the settlement that he had selected for a home.

After living at this pioneer home for four years, he moved to Vincennes and opened a tavern, which he kept for two years until returning to his settlement in the woods. He was a captain in the militia, and after his duties in the War of 1812 was promoted to the rank of brigadier general.

After the war, he returned to his homestead and was elected by his fellow citizens to the office of county clerk. Eventually he was elected to the territorial legislature from Knox County.

Evans remained in Gibson County until about 1820 when he moved to what is now Vanderburgh County, where he had bought land from Hugh McGary, the original owner of the land now called Evansville. He moved to New Harmony for a few years after becoming fascinated with the German socialist movement there, and worked as assistant postmaster. He moved back to Evansville and remained there until his death in 1844.

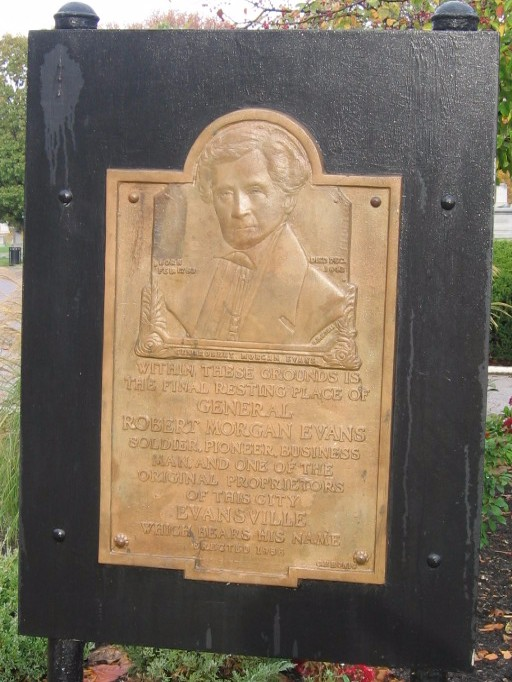
Plaque at Oak Hill Cemetery in Evansville, Indiana which reads: "Within these grounds is the final resting place of General Roberts Morgan Evans, soldier, pioneer, business man and one of the original proprietors of this city, Evansville, which bears his name"

He was Vanderburgh County clerk, helped plot lots and streets in Evansville, and was a successful dealer in farm implements and real estate. He remained active in the legislature and was elected Speaker of the Indiana House of Representatives in 1825. In the legislature he put forth bills to establish railroad service to Evansville. His efforts were unsuccessful, although shortly after his death the legislature did approve a railroad into Evansville.

== Personality and physical appearance ==
Evansville and Its Men of Mark described Evans as a man of “sterling integrity” and a “radical advocate of the right.” It described him as more than six feet tall, with a smooth-shaven face, small hands and feet, and an open expression, and characterized him as kind and affable, with “rare conversational powers.” According to the account, he enjoyed the friendship and veneration of those who knew him in his later years.
