= Haynies Corner Arts District =

Coordinates: 37°57′44.1″N 87°33′58.2″W

Haynie's Corner Arts District
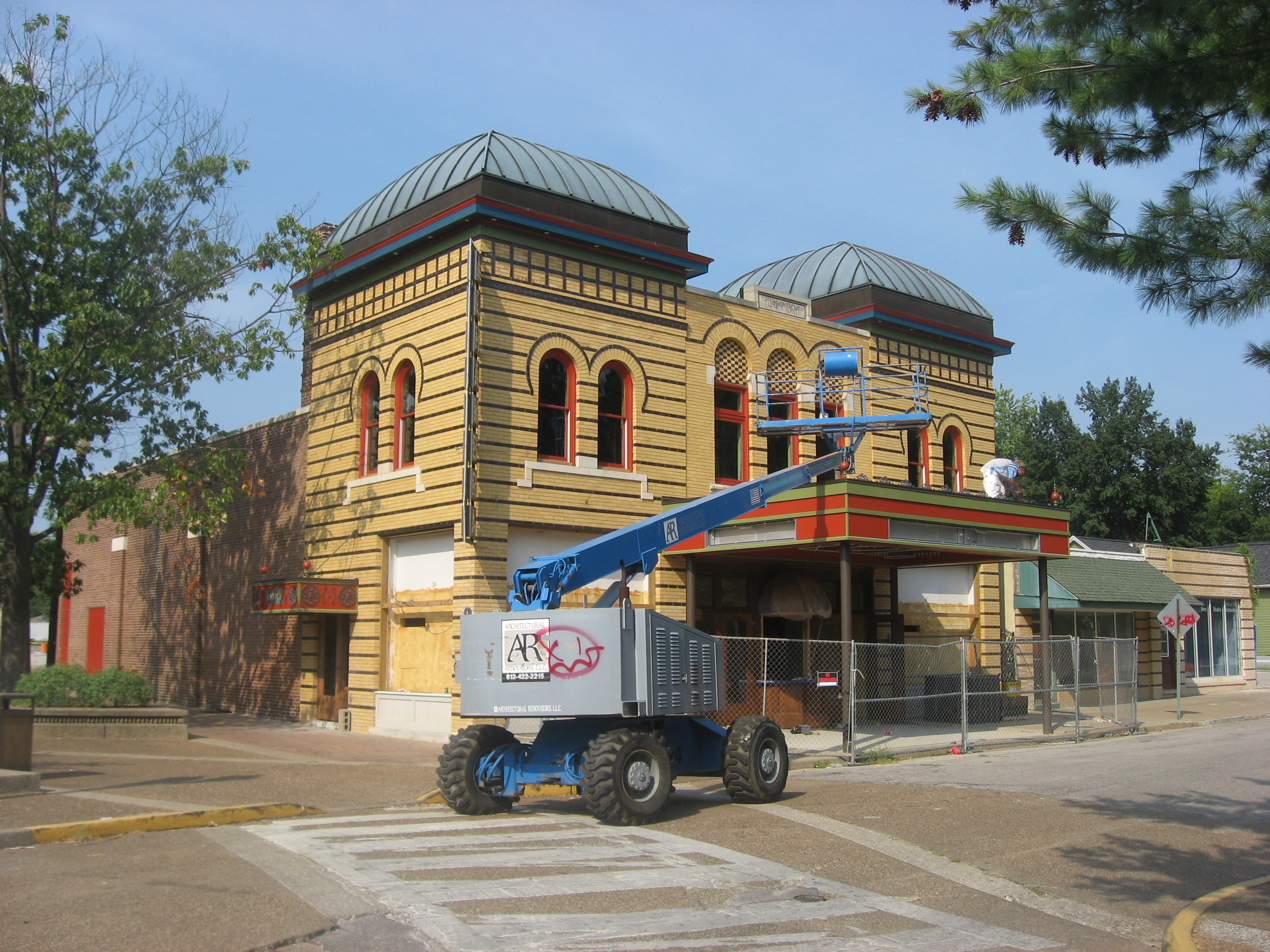
- Alhambra Theatorium under construction

- Location within Indiana Location within the United States
- Location: Evansville, Indiana's south-central side, adjacent to Downtown Evansville

The Haynie's Corner Arts District is a small area in Evansville's south-central side, adjacent to Downtown Evansville. Centered on Haynie's Corner, a small square, the district is resided mainly by artists and is one of the only areas in the city where residential showrooms are allowed.

The district is home to an art festival show with painters, sculptors, craftsmen, artisans, and musicians. It also hosts the Midwest Dragon Boat Racing Festival.

The district was formed in October 2006, after the city council approved its formation. The local government has supported the area with various grants.
