= Karges Furniture =

American furniture company

Karges Furniture is a family-owned furniture company originating in Evansville, Indiana. The company manufactures custom high-end furniture which is sold mostly to designers through wholesale showrooms. After the acquisition of Karges by another luxury furniture maker, Kindel Furniture, all production of Karges was moved to Grand Rapids, Michigan. All of the company's casegoods are now made in Grand Rapids, Michigan.

== History ==
After World War II, Edwin's son, Edwin F. Karges Jr., joined the business. He graduated from the University of Michigan with a degree in Wood Technology, and his knowledge and skill in wood finishing provided the groundwork for developing the Karges finishing process. Over the years all four of the Karges children have been involved in the business. In the fall on 1982, the company experienced major sales loss and severe layoffs, morale issues and was threatened by a teamster vote. The youngest of the four Karges children, Jeff Karges a psychotherapist living in California, became the new CEO and was able to transform the marketing, products and distribution enough to revive the company and within 8 years, triple the sales. Jeff worked with furniture designer Don Burgess and introduced many products that received international ASID design awards and are still key products today. Likewise, the advertising campaign won a prestigious MPA's Kelly Award alongside American Express and Nikon (Fortune, March 17, 1986, "Advertising So Good We Are Advertising It"). Unfortunately, a family battle ensued in 1990 at which point Joan Karges Rogier came back and worked alongside her father until his passing in 2004.

Karges was acquired by Kindel Furniture on April 30, 2014. At the time, Kindel stated it planned to invest in the Karges brand and continue the tradition of craftsmanship carried forth by five generations of Karges family ownership. Gretchen Keith, the great-great-granddaughter of company founder Albert Karges, joined Kindel as vice president of marketing and sales.

In September 2024 Kindel was acquired by Holladay Design Group along with Karges and Councill Brands. Prior to that, Karges was acquired by Kindel Furniture on April 30, 2014.[3] At the time, Kindel stated it planned to invest in the Karges brand and continue the tradition of craftsmanship carried forth by five generations of Karges family ownership. Gretchen Keith, the great-great-granddaughter of company founder Albert Karges, joined Kindel as vice president of marketing and sales.[4]

Over the years all four of Edwin Jr.'s children were involved in the business. Jeff Karges was the CEO until 1990 and then Joan Karges Rogier worked alongside her father and represented the fourth generation of leadership.
