= Evansville, Indiana =

Evansville
- City
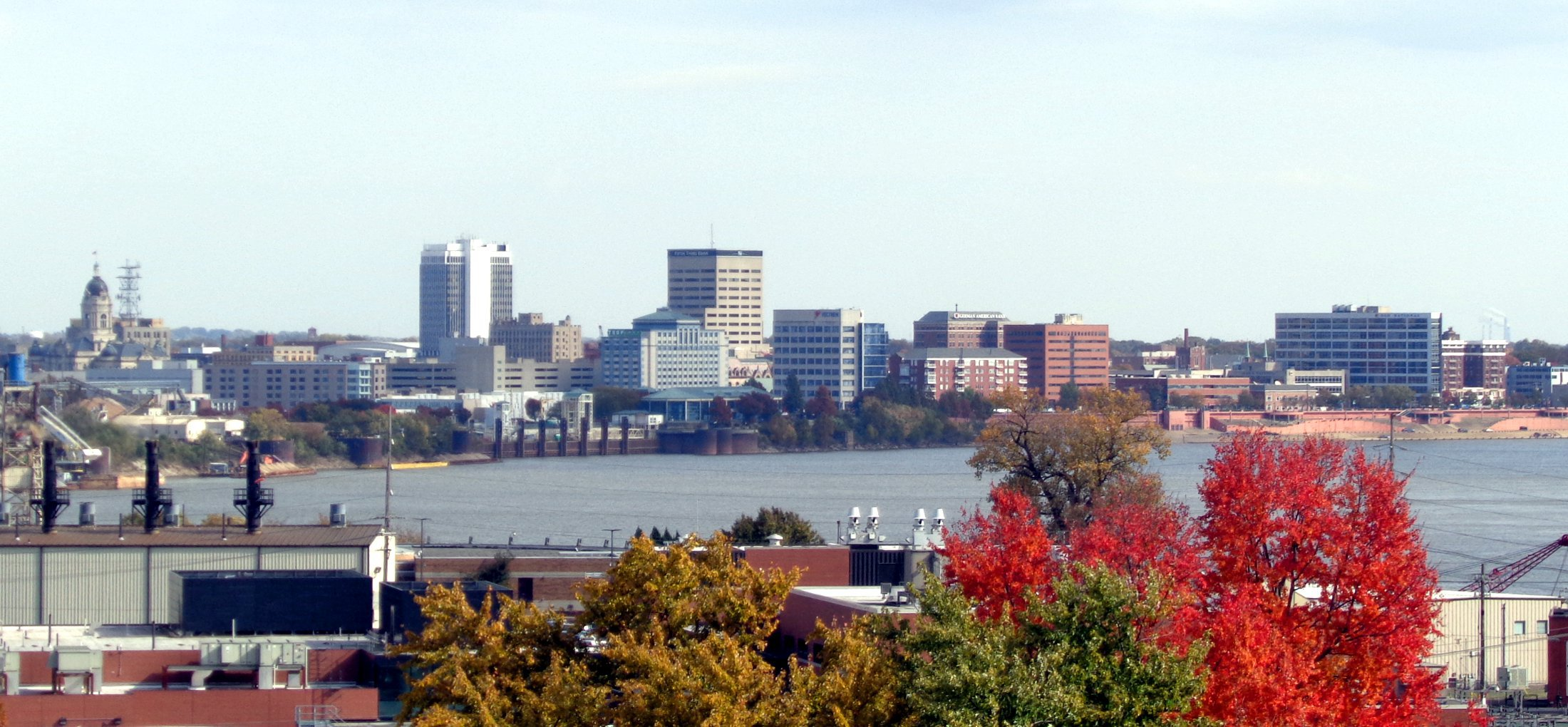
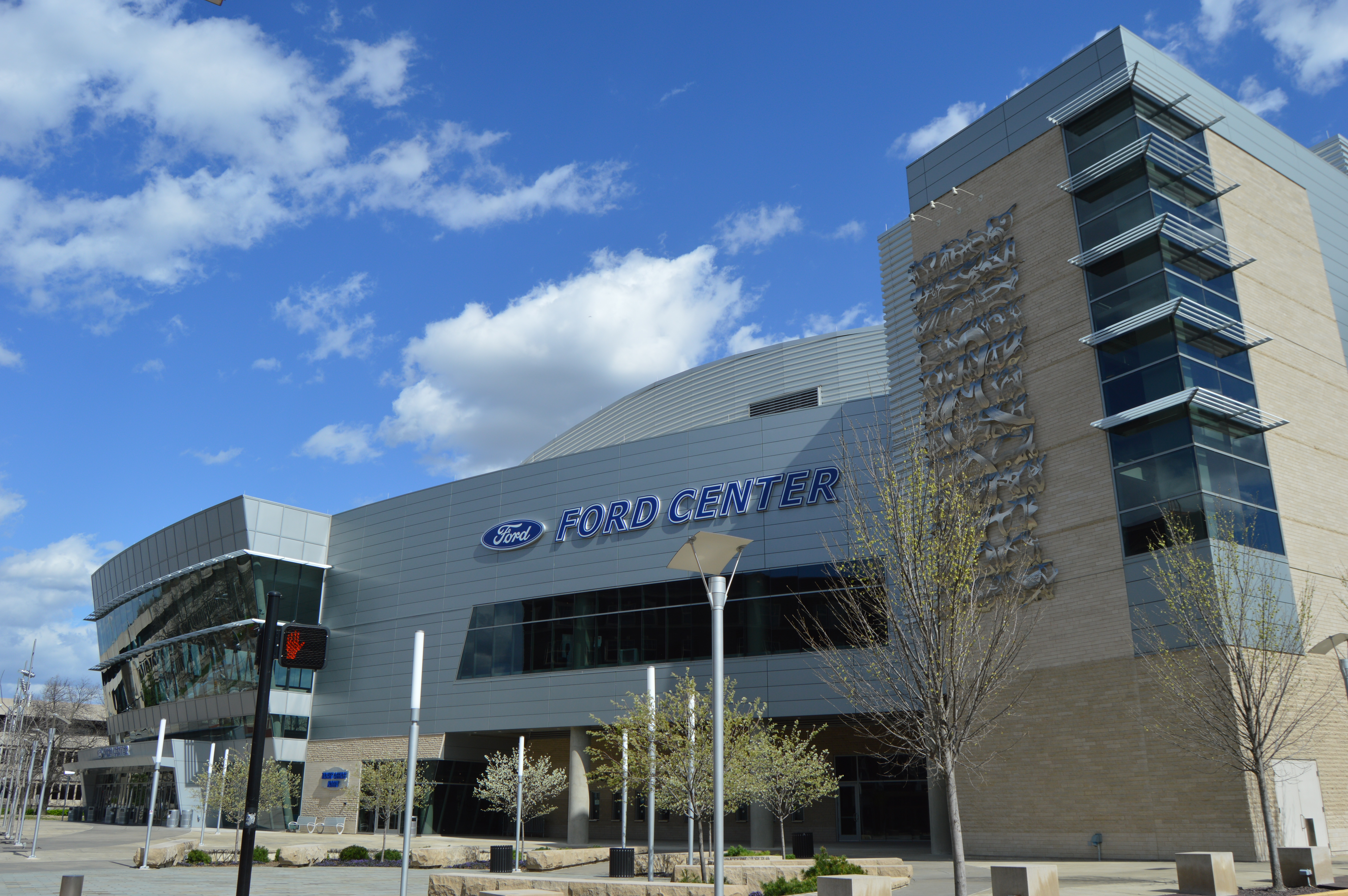
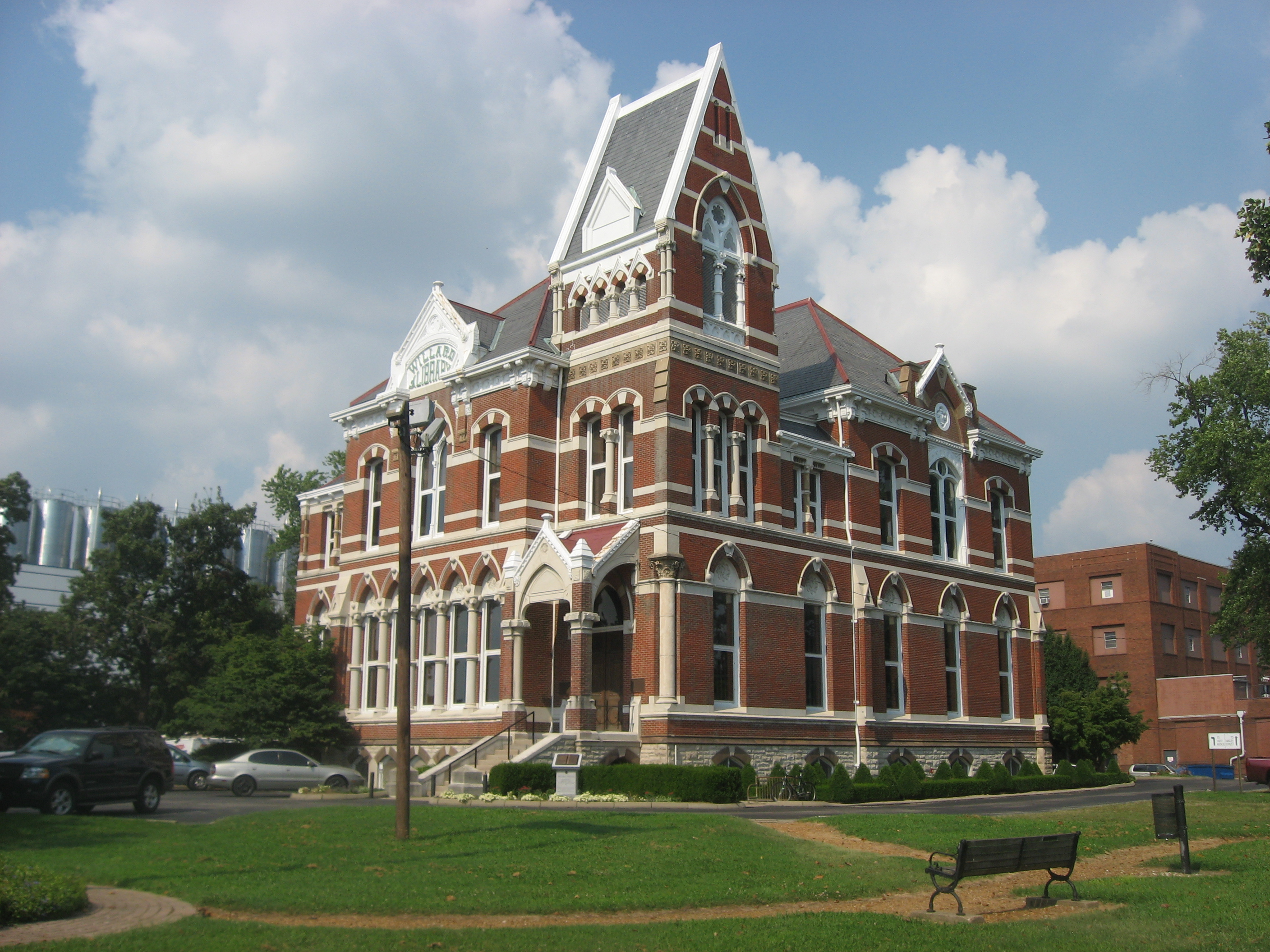
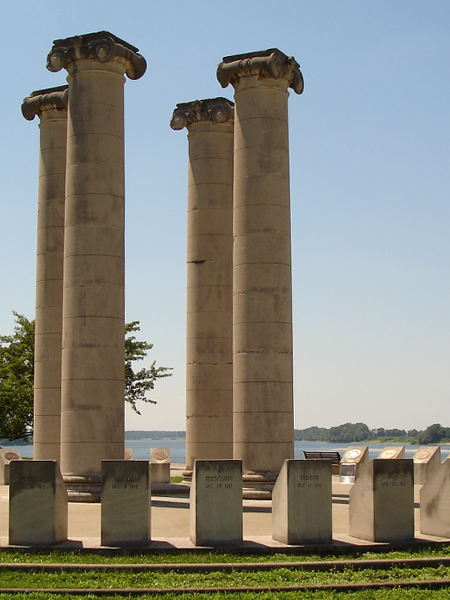
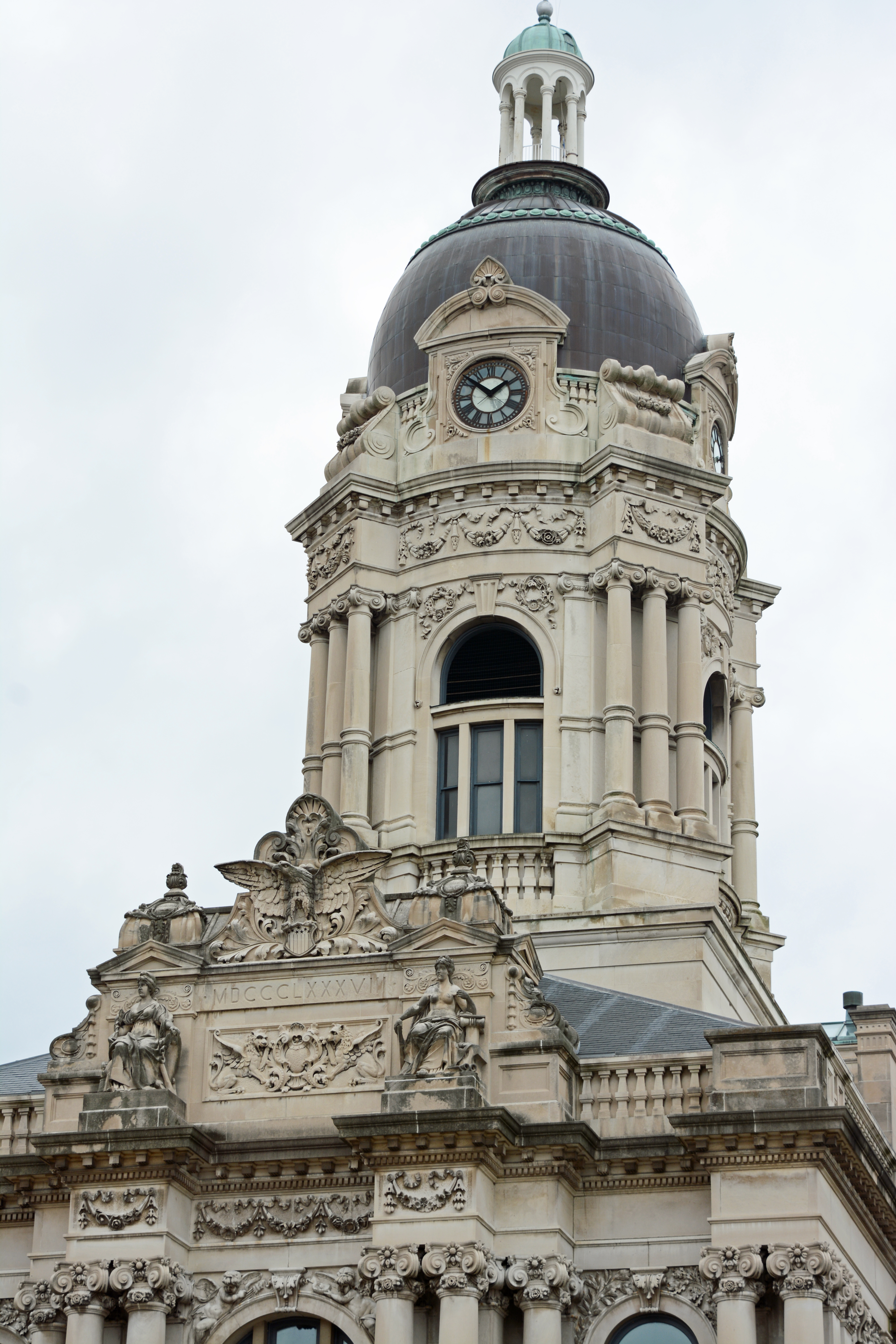
- Downtown Evansville skyline from Dreier Boulevard Ford Center Willard Library Four Freedoms Monument Reitz Home Old Courthouse

- Flag Seal Wordmark
- Nicknames: Eville, The Ville, River City, Stoplight City, Pocket City, Crescent City
- Interactive map of Evansville
- Location within Indiana Location within the United States
- Coordinates: 37°58′38″N 87°33′2″W
- Country: United States
- State: Indiana
- Regions: IN–IL–KY Tri-State Area, SW Indiana
- County: Vanderburgh
- Townships: Center, German, Knight, Perry, Pigeon
- Founded: 1812
- Incorporated: 1817
- City Charter: 1847

Government
  - Mayor: Stephanie Terry (D)

Area
  - City: 47.85 sq mi (123.93 km^{2})
  - Land: 47.36 sq mi (122.65 km^{2})
  - Water: 0.49 sq mi (1.28 km^{2})
  - Metro: 2,367 sq mi (6,130 km^{2})
- Elevation: 384 ft (117 m)

Population (2020)
  - City: 117,298
  - Rank: 1st in Vanderburgh County; 1st in Southern Indiana; 3rd in Indiana; 223rd in the United States
  - Density: 2,477.0/sq mi (956.37/km^{2})
  - Urban: 206,855 (US: 185th)
  - Urban density: 1,834.6/sq mi (708.3/km^{2})
  - Metro: 358,676 (US: 142nd)
- Demonym(s): Evansvillian, Vanderburger

GDP
  - Metro: $25.278 billion (2022)
- Time zone: UTC−6 (Central (CST))
  - Summer (DST): UTC−5 (CDT)
- ZIP codes: 40 total ZIP codes: 47701, 47702, 47703, 47704, 47705, 47706, 47708, 47710, 47711, 47712, 47713, 47714, 47715, 47716, 47719, 47720, 47721, 47722, 47724, 47725, 47726, 47727, 47728, 47730, 47731, 47732, 47733, 47734, 47735, 47736, 47738, 47739, 47740, 47741, 47744, 47747, 47750, 47755, 47761, 47777
- Area codes: 812 & 930
- FIPS code: 18-22000
- GNIS feature ID: 434258
- Website: www.evansvillegov.org

Evansville is a city in Vanderburgh County, Indiana, United States, and its county seat. With a population of 118,414 at the 2020 census, it is the third-most populous city in Indiana (after Indianapolis and Fort Wayne), the most populous city in Southern Indiana, and the 249th-most populous city in the United States. It is the central city of the Evansville metropolitan area, a hub of commercial, medical, and cultural activity of southwestern Indiana and the Illinois–Indiana–Kentucky tri-state area, which is home to over 911,000 people. The 38th parallel north crosses the north side of the city and is marked on Interstate 69 immediately north of its junction with Indiana 62 within the city's east side.

Situated on a meander in the Ohio River, the city is often referred to as the "Crescent Valley" or "River City". Early French explorers named it La Belle Rivière ("The Beautiful River"). The area has been inhabited by various indigenous cultures for millennia, dating back at least 10,000 years. Angel Mounds was a permanent settlement of the Mississippian culture from AD 1000 to around 1400. The city of Evansville was founded in 1812.

Evansville anchors a regional economic hub based primarily on trade, transportation, and utilities; professional and business services; education and health services; government; leisure and hospitality; and manufacturing. Two NYSE-listed companies (Berry Global and OneMain Financial) are headquartered in Evansville, and three companies traded on NASDAQ (Escalade, Old National Bank, and Shoe Carnival) are also headquartered in Evansville.

Evansville is home to Bally's Evansville, the state's first casino; Mesker Park Zoo and Botanic Garden, one of the state's oldest and largest zoos; and sports tourism industry. The city has several notable educational institutions. The University of Evansville is a private school on the city's east side, while the University of Southern Indiana is a larger public institution just outside the city's westside limits. The Indiana University School of Medicine also maintains a campus in Evansville. Other local educational institutions include the nationally ranked Signature School, the Evansville Vanderburgh Public Library, and the Evansville Vanderburgh School Corporation.

== History ==
=== Establishment and early history ===
There has been a continuous human presence in the area that became Evansville from at least 8000 BC by Paleo-Indians. Archaeologists have identified several archaic and ancient sites in and near Evansville, with the most complex at Angel Mounds. This was built and occupied from about AD 900 to about 1600, just before the arrival of Europeans to North America.

Following the abandonment of Angel Mounds between 1400 and 1450, tribes of the historic Miami, Shawnee, Piankeshaw, Wyandot, Delaware and other Native American peoples were known to be in the area. French hunters and trappers were among the first Europeans to come to the area, using Vincennes as a base of operations for fur trading. The land encompassing Evansville was formally relinquished by the Delaware in 1805 to General William Henry Harrison, then governor of the Indiana Territory.

The city of Evansville, Indiana was founded in 1812 and incorporated in 1817. It is situated on a meander in the Ohio River, and is often referred to as the "Crescent Valley" or "River City".

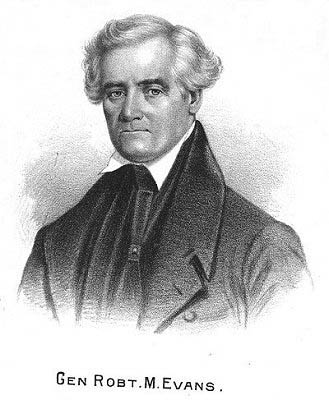
Robert Morgan Evans

On March 27, 1812, Hugh McGary Jr. purchased about 441 acres (178 ha) and named it "McGary's Landing". In 1814, to attract more people, McGary renamed his village "Evansville" in honor of Colonel Robert Morgan Evans. Evansville incorporated in 1817 and was designated as the county seat on January 7, 1818. The county was named for Henry Vanderburgh, a deceased chief judge of the Indiana Territorial Supreme Court.

Evansville became a thriving commercial town with a river trade, and the town began to expand outside of its original footprint. Evansville's west side was for many years cut off from the city's main part by Pigeon Creek and the factories that developed along it, making the creek an industrial corridor. The land comprising the former town of Lamasco was platted in 1837 and was annexed in 1870.

=== 18th and 19th centuries ===
Evansville's economy received a boost in the early 1830s when Indiana unveiled plans to build the longest canal in the world, a 400-mile (640 km) ditch to connect the Great Lakes at Toledo, Ohio with the inland rivers at Evansville. The project was intended to open Indiana to commerce and improve transportation from New Orleans to New York City. The project bankrupted the state and was so poorly engineered that it would not hold water. By the time the Wabash and Erie Canal was finished in 1853, Evansville's first railroad, Evansville & Crawfordsville Railroad, was opened to Terre Haute.

The era of Evansville's greatest growth occurred in the second half of the 19th century, following the disruptions of the Civil War. The city was a major stop for steamboats along the Ohio River, and it was the home port for a number of companies engaged in trade via the river. Coal mining, manufacturing, and hardwood lumber was a major source of economic activity. By 1900, Evansville was one of the world's largest hardwood furniture centers, with 41 factories employing approximately 2,000 workers. Railroads eventually became more important and in 1887 the L&N Railroad constructed a bridge across the Ohio River. Along with a major rail yard southwest of Evansville in Howell, which was annexed in 1916 and completed the city's counterclockwise march around the horseshoe bend.

Throughout this period, Evansville's main ethnic groups consisted of Protestant Scotch-Irish from the South, Catholic Irish coming for canal or railroad work, New England businessmen, Germans fleeing Europe after the 1848 revolutions, and freedmen from western Kentucky. By the 1890 census, Evansville ranked as the 56th-largest urban area in the United States, but it was surpassed in population by other cities in the early 1900s. As the new century began, the city continued to develop to its eastern areas. Manufacturing also took off, particularly in the automobile and refrigeration industries.

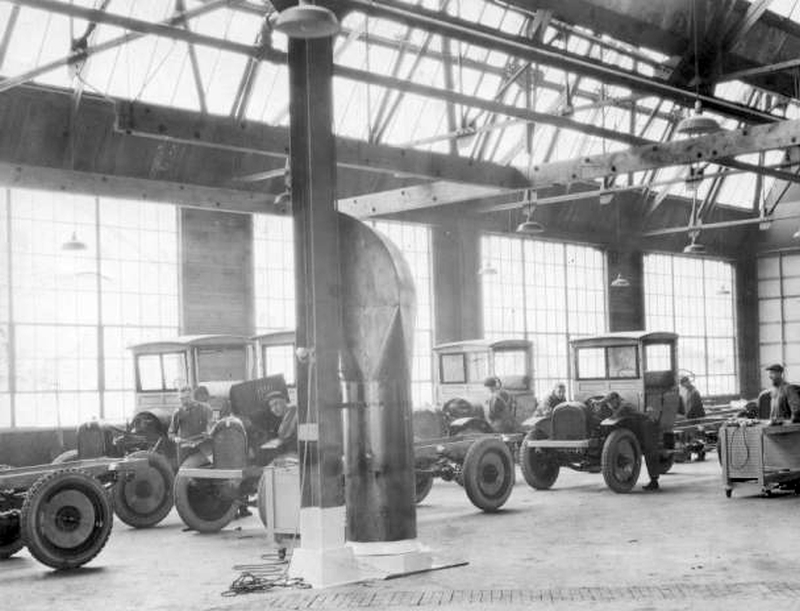
Final stage of truck assembly at Graham Brothers Truck Plant in Evansville, 1920

=== 20th and 21st centuries ===
The Graham brothers, Ray, Robert, and Joseph, got their start with a successful glass factory in Evansville. After they sold it in 1907, the glass factory became Libbey-Owens-Ford. In 1916, seeing the need for a dependable truck, the Graham brothers entered the truck chassis business. Evansville was home to Graham Brothers Trucks from then until 1929. The dependability of Graham trucks was due in part to their use of Torbensen internal gear drive rear axles.

In 1921, after the death of both Dodge brothers, Graham Brothers started selling 1.5-ton pickups through Dodge dealers. (Dodge did not manufacture trucks at the time). These vehicles had Graham chassis and some Dodge parts. Dodge Brothers bought a controlling interest in Graham Brothers in 1925, picking up the rest in 1926.

In 1920, members of the national Ku Klux Klan were sent to Evansville as part of an attempt to promote the Klan in the North. The Evansville branch grew to become one of the largest branches in the state. At its peak, there were approximately 85,000 members; 22% of the city's total population. Membership declined rapidly after the murder of Madge Oberholtzer.

The city saw exponential growth in the early twentieth century with the production of lumber and the manufacturing of furniture. By 1920, Evansville had more than two dozen furniture companies. In the decades of the 1920s and 1930s, city leaders attempted to improve Evansville's transportation position and successfully lobbied to be on the Chicago-to-Miami "Dixie Bee Highway" (U.S. Highway 41). A bridge was built across the Ohio River in 1932 and in that same decade steps were taken to develop an airport.

The Ohio River flood of 1937 covered 500 city blocks in Evansville, resulting in a major crisis. Because of this, the city was placed under martial law. With steamboats less necessary to the local economy, city and federal officials responded to the flood and its destruction by constructing more and higher levees: construction that penned and hid the Ohio River behind a barrier of earthen berms and concrete walls.

During World War II, Evansville was a major center of industrial production which helped revive the regional economy after the Great Depression. A huge 45-acre (18 ha) shipyard complex was constructed on the riverfront east of St. Joseph Avenue for the production of oceangoing LSTs (Landing Ship-Tanks). The Evansville Shipyard was the nation's largest inland producer of LSTs. The Plymouth factory was converted into a plant which turned out "bullets by the billions," and many other companies switched over to the manufacture of war material. In 1942, an aircraft factory was constructed adjacent to the airport north of the city for the manufacture of the Republic P-47D fighter aircraft, the legendary P-47 Thunderbolt. Evansville produced a total of 6,242 P-47s, almost half of the P-47s made nationally during the war.

After the war, Evansville's manufacturing base of automobiles, household appliances, and farm equipment benefited from growing post-war demand. A growing housing demand also caused residential development to leap north and east of the city. However, between 1955 and 1963, a nationwide recession hit Evansville. Among other closures, Servel (which produced refrigerators) went out of business and Chrysler ended its local operations. The economy was saved from near total collapse by 28 businesses that moved into the area, including Whirlpool, Alcoa, and General Electric.

On December 6, 2022, in recognition of the city's massive production efforts during World War II, it was announced that Evansville had been designated Indiana's American World War II Heritage City by the National Park Service.

== Geography ==
The Evansville metropolitan area, the 142nd largest in the United States, includes three Indiana counties (Posey, Vanderburgh, and Warrick) and two Kentucky counties (Henderson, and Webster). The metropolitan area does not include Owensboro, Kentucky, which is an adjacent metropolitan area about 30 miles (48 km) southeast of Evansville. This area is sometimes referred to as "Kentuckiana", although it is usually referred to as the “tri-state" by the local media.

According to the 2010 census, Evansville has an area of 44.622 square miles (115.57 km^{2}), of which 44.15 square miles (114.35 km^{2}) (or 98.94%) is land and 0.472 square miles (1.22 km^{2}) (or 1.06%) is water.

=== Topography ===
The city's southern boundary lies on an oxbow in the Ohio River. Most of the city lies in a shallow valley surrounded by low rolling hills. The city's west side is built on these rolling hills and is home to Burdette Park, Mesker Amphitheatre, and Mesker Park Zoo. The eastern portion developed in the valley and is protected by a series of levees that closely follow the path of I-69. Notable landmarks on the east side are the 240-acre (1.0 km^{2}) Wesselman Woods Nature Preserve and the Angel Mounds State Historic Site, just southeast of Evansville, between Evansville and Newburgh.

=== Cityscape ===
For more details on this topic, see List of tallest buildings in Evansville

Evansville's original downtown plat was made on about 200 acres (0.31 sq mi), with streets running parallel to the river from northwest to southeast. Other streets nearby were later laid out on the cardinal points, due north–south, and east–west. Thus, anyone entering or leaving downtown finds the street makes a confusing oblique-angle turn in one direction or another. In the 1970s, the city suffered from problems such as decreased economic activity and suburban flight, but city-sponsored revitalization has improved downtown conditions.

The business district and riverfront feature land-based casino gambling, restaurants, bars, and shops that attract tens of thousands of visitors each year. Although much of the outer city's architecture is typical suburban design, the city's downtown district retains early twentieth-century architecture. A few blocks east of the main business district is the Riverside district, featuring tree-lined brick streets full of turn of the twentieth-century homes. The Reitz Home Museum is one of the finest examples of French second empire architecture in the United States. Other homes nearby feature similar character and design and include Italianate, Colonial Revival, and Renaissance Revival styles.

=== Neighborhoods ===
Evansville has thirteen neighborhoods that have qualified as historic districts and are listed on the National Register of Historic Places.

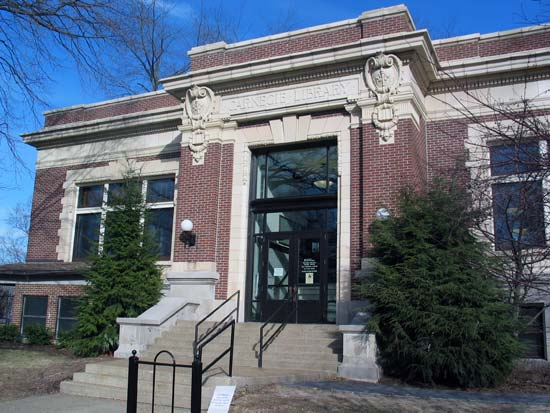
Bayard Park

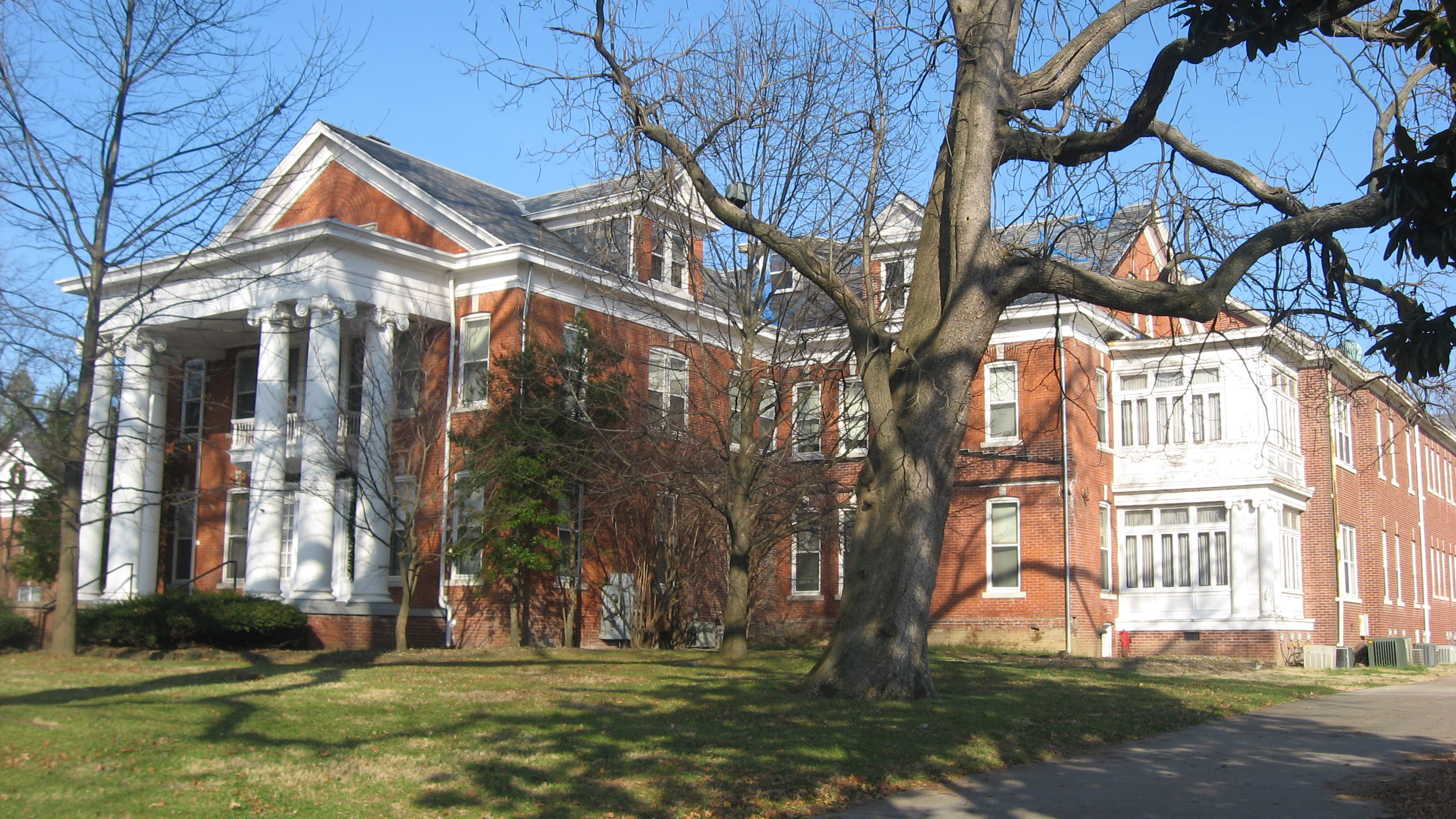
Culver

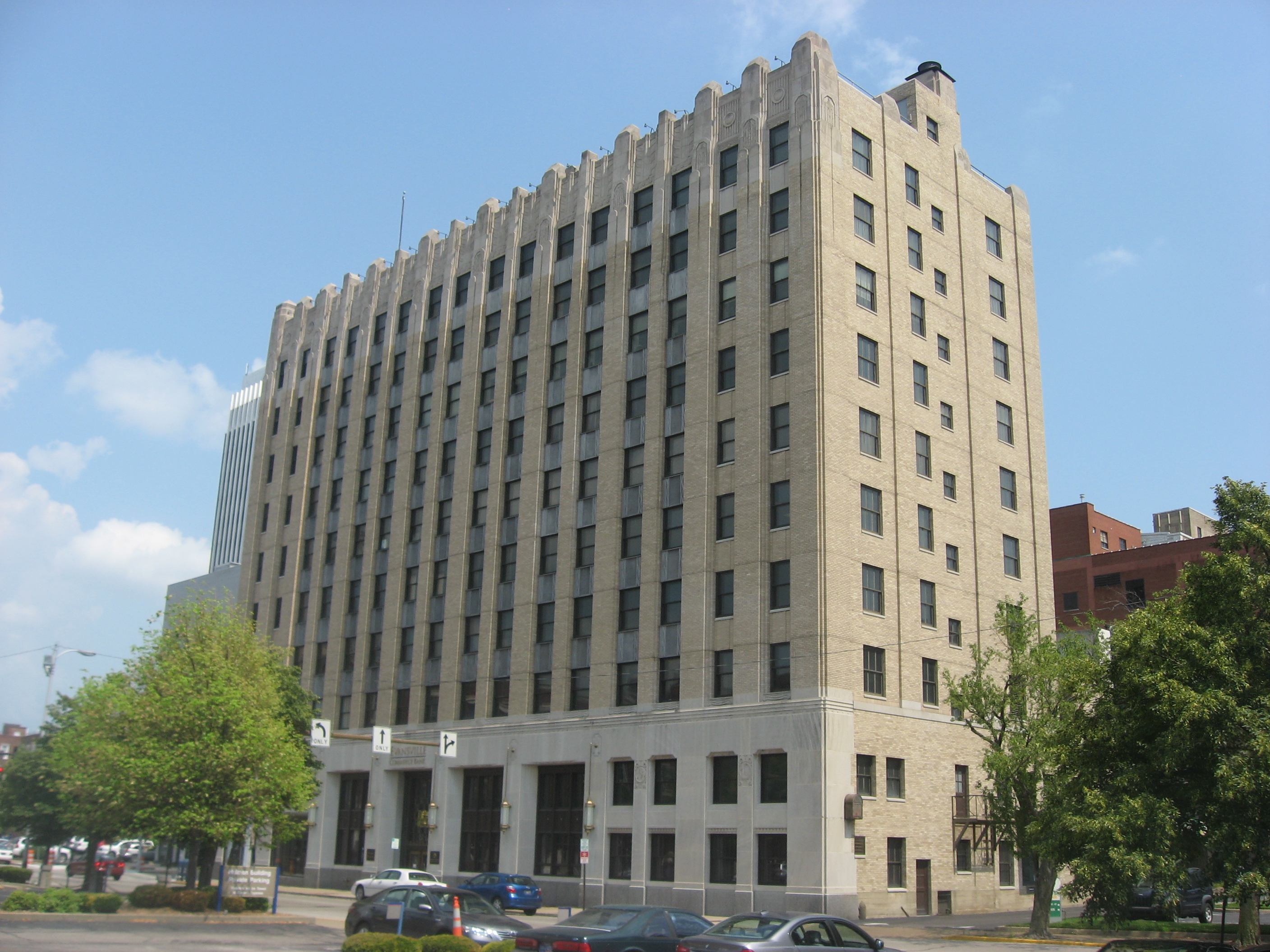
Downtown

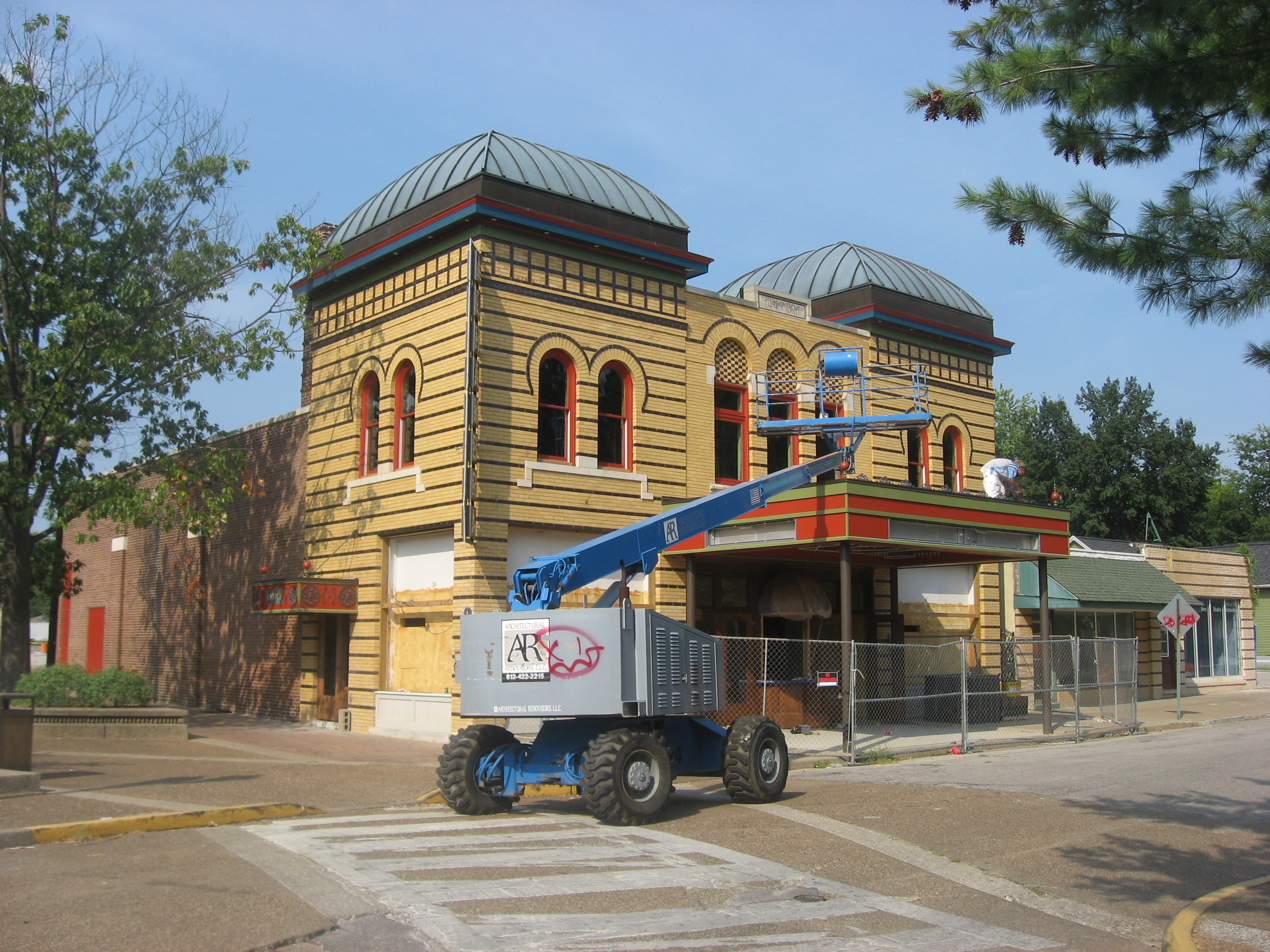
Haynie's Corner

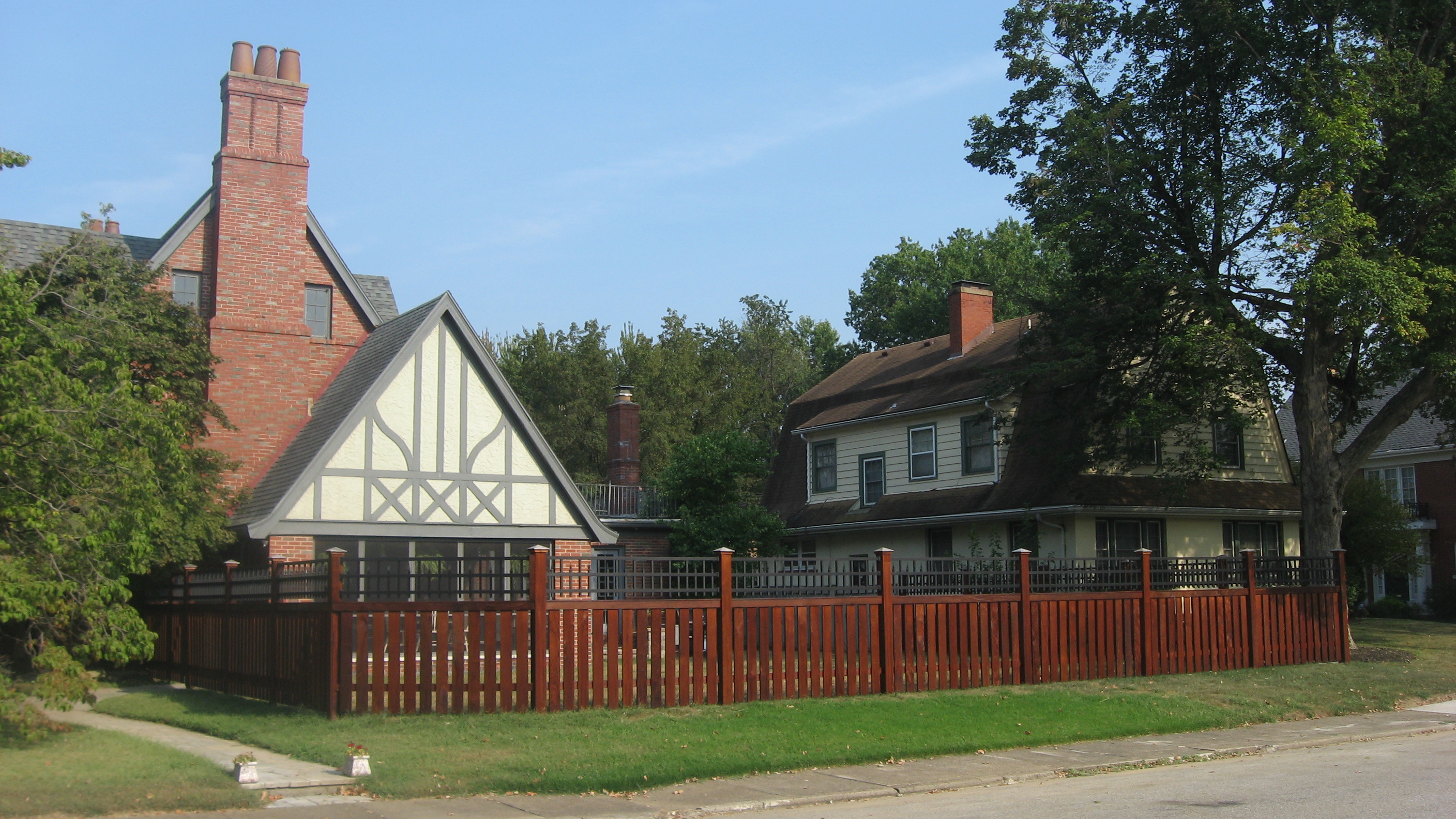
Lincolnshire

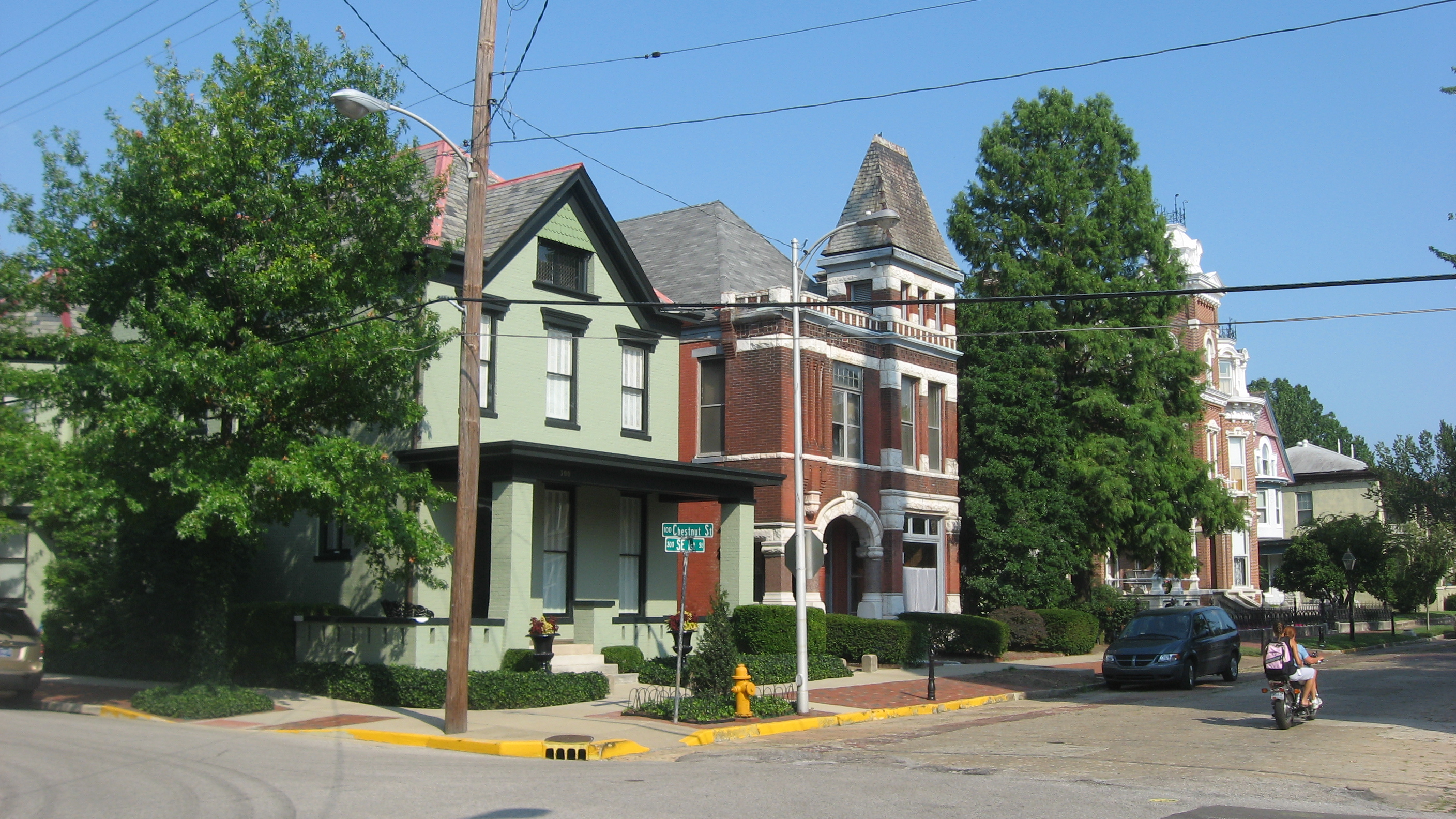
Riverside

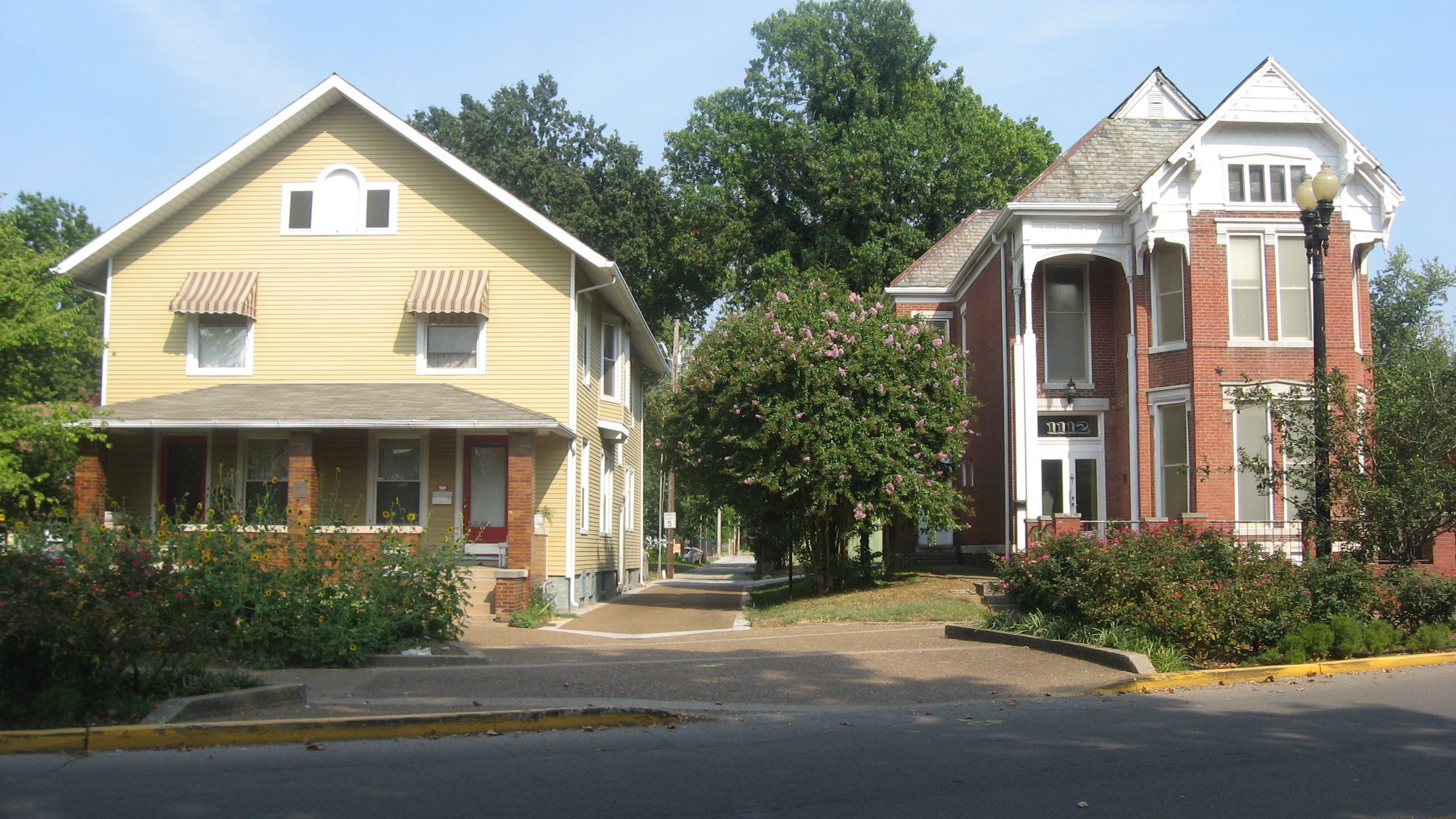
Washington Avenue

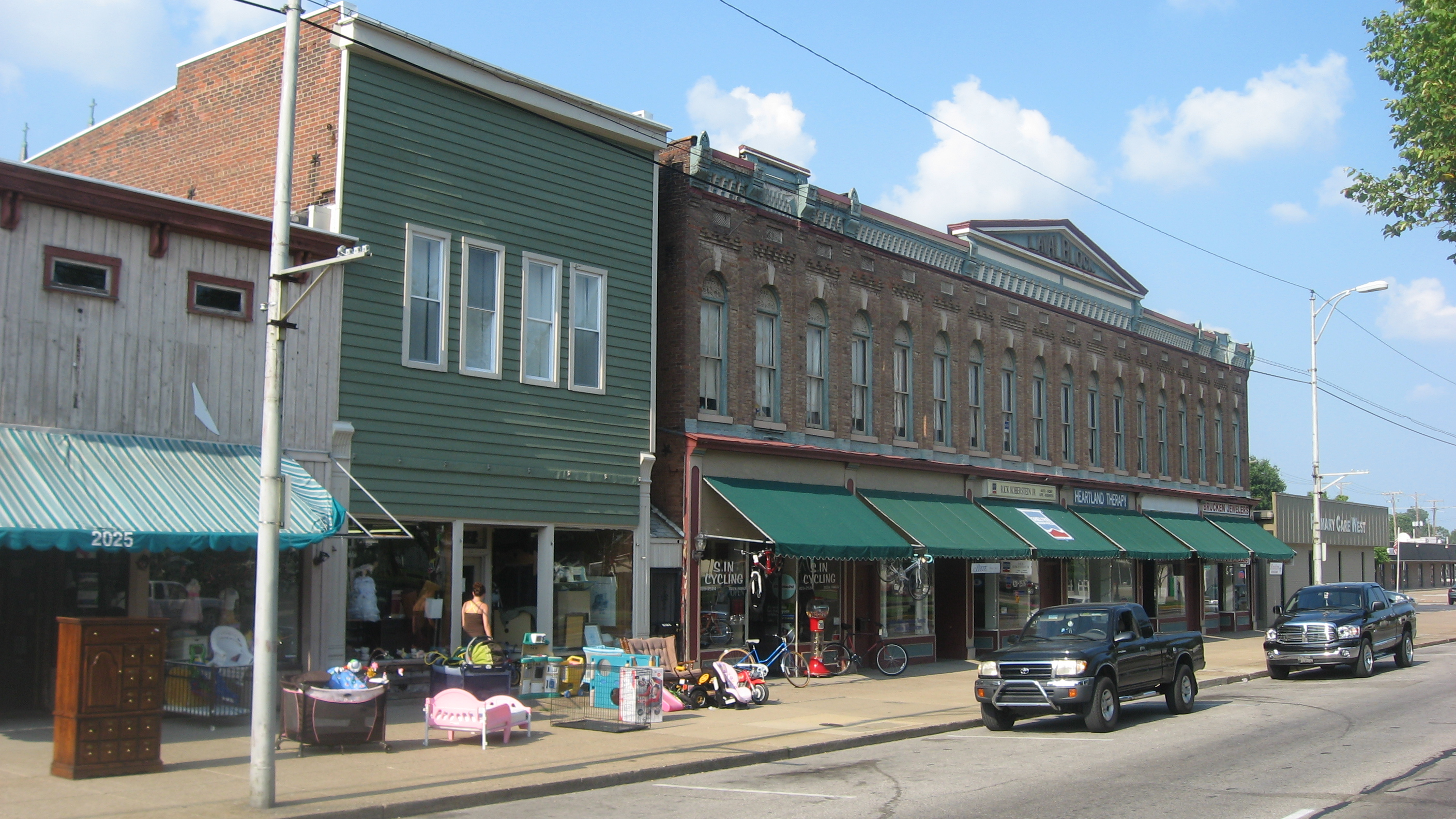
West Franklin Street

==== Red Bank ====
Red Bank is an unincorporated community on the west edge of Evansville. The community is bordered to the south by Broadway Avenue and Middle Mount Vernon Road. To the east lies the Carpentier Creek. The majority of the housing is centered on Bosse and Claremont. Several shopping centers are in the area, offering a wide variety of restaurants and shopping outlets, including two supermarkets and a major Wal-Mart outlet. The Lloyd Expressway passes through just north of the community, giving direct access to Indiana State Road 62.

While the nearby community of Mud Center is more frequently included on maps than Red Bank, it is usually referred to by locals as part of Red Bank (the name "Mud Center" is virtually unknown to locals), even though it is a separate community.

=== Climate ===
Evansville, Indiana

Climate chart (precipitation, max. and min. temperature)
| J | F | M | A | M | J | J | A | S | O | N | D |
| 3.4 42 26 | 3.2 47 28 | 4.6 57 36 | 5.1 68 46 | 5.1 77 57 | 4.4 86 65 | 4.4 89 69 | 3.1 88 67 | 3.3 82 59 | 3.4 70 47 | 4.1 56 37 | 3.8 46 30 |
- █ Average max. and min. temperatures in °F
- █ Precipitation totals in inches
Metric conversion
| J | F | M | A | M | J | J | A | S | O | N | D |
| 85 5 −4 | 82 8 −2 | 117 14 2 | 131 20 8 | 130 25 14 | 113 30 19 | 111 31 20 | 78 31 19 | 84 28 15 | 86 21 8 | 104 13 3 | 96 8 −1 |
- █ Average max. and min. temperatures in °C
- █ Precipitation totals in mm

Evansville lies within the northern limits of the humid subtropical climate (Köppen Cfa), and straddles the border between USDA plant hardiness zones 6b and 7a. Summers are hot and humid, winters are cold to cool. Average temperatures range from 32.5 °F (0.3 °C) in January to 78.0 °F (25.6 °C) in July. Annual precipitation averages 45.3 inches (1,150 mm), including an average seasonal snowfall of 11.8 inches (30 cm). Evansville winters can range from just 0.5 in (1.3 cm) of snowfall in 2011–12, up to 37.9 in (96 cm) in 1969–70. On average, there are 41 days annually with a maximum temperature of 90 °F (32 °C) or above and 17 days with a maximum at or below freezing; the mean first and last freeze dates are October 26 and April 7, resulting in a frost-free period of 201 days. Extreme temperatures range from −23 °F (−31 °C) on February 2, 1951, up to 111 °F (44 °C) on July 28, 1930; the record cold maximum of −3 °F (−19 °C) was set on January 20, 1985, and December 22, 1989, while, conversely, the record warm minimum of 82 °F (28 °C) was last reached July 8, 1980.

Climate data for Evansville Regional Airport, Indiana (1991–2020 normals, extremes 1897−present) (Note: Snowfall and snow depth records only date to 1 January 1948.)
| Month | Jan | Feb | Mar | Apr | May | Jun | Jul | Aug | Sep | Oct | Nov | Dec | Year |
|---|---|---|---|---|---|---|---|---|---|---|---|---|---|
| Record high °F (°C) | 76 (24) | 79 (26) | 88 (31) | 91 (33) | 98 (37) | 107 (42) | 111 (44) | 105 (41) | 104 (40) | 96 (36) | 86 (30) | 77 (25) | 111 (44) |
| Mean maximum °F (°C) | 63.4 (17.4) | 69.2 (20.7) | 76.5 (24.7) | 83.1 (28.4) | 89.3 (31.8) | 94.4 (34.7) | 96.0 (35.6) | 95.6 (35.3) | 93.0 (33.9) | 85.8 (29.9) | 74.4 (23.6) | 65.6 (18.7) | 97.6 (36.4) |
| Mean daily maximum °F (°C) | 41.7 (5.4) | 46.7 (8.2) | 56.8 (13.8) | 68.4 (20.2) | 77.3 (25.2) | 85.7 (29.8) | 88.6 (31.4) | 87.9 (31.1) | 81.9 (27.7) | 70.1 (21.2) | 56.2 (13.4) | 45.6 (7.6) | 67.2 (19.6) |
| Daily mean °F (°C) | 33.6 (0.9) | 37.6 (3.1) | 46.6 (8.1) | 57.2 (14.0) | 66.9 (19.4) | 75.5 (24.2) | 78.7 (25.9) | 77.3 (25.2) | 70.3 (21.3) | 58.6 (14.8) | 46.3 (7.9) | 37.5 (3.1) | 57.2 (14.0) |
| Mean daily minimum °F (°C) | 25.5 (−3.6) | 28.4 (−2.0) | 36.4 (2.4) | 46.1 (7.8) | 56.6 (13.7) | 65.3 (18.5) | 68.8 (20.4) | 66.7 (19.3) | 58.6 (14.8) | 47.1 (8.4) | 36.5 (2.5) | 29.5 (−1.4) | 47.1 (8.4) |
| Mean minimum °F (°C) | 5.0 (−15.0) | 10.4 (−12.0) | 18.6 (−7.4) | 29.9 (−1.2) | 40.9 (4.9) | 51.7 (10.9) | 58.8 (14.9) | 56.6 (13.7) | 43.8 (6.6) | 30.9 (−0.6) | 21.2 (−6.0) | 10.9 (−11.7) | 1.7 (−16.8) |
| Record low °F (°C) | −21 (−29) | −23 (−31) | −9 (−23) | 23 (−5) | 28 (−2) | 41 (5) | 47 (8) | 43 (6) | 31 (−1) | 21 (−6) | −3 (−19) | −15 (−26) | −23 (−31) |
| Average precipitation inches (mm) | 3.35 (85) | 3.22 (82) | 4.60 (117) | 5.14 (131) | 5.12 (130) | 4.44 (113) | 4.38 (111) | 3.07 (78) | 3.31 (84) | 3.39 (86) | 4.11 (104) | 3.78 (96) | 47.91 (1,217) |
| Average snowfall inches (cm) | 3.4 (8.6) | 3.1 (7.9) | 1.1 (2.8) | 0.0 (0.0) | 0.0 (0.0) | 0.0 (0.0) | 0.0 (0.0) | 0.0 (0.0) | 0.0 (0.0) | 0.2 (0.51) | 0.2 (0.51) | 2.8 (7.1) | 10.8 (27) |
| Average precipitation days (≥ 0.01 in) | 10.4 | 9.7 | 11.2 | 11.7 | 12.6 | 10.1 | 9.6 | 6.9 | 7.5 | 8.3 | 9.6 | 10.4 | 118.0 |
| Average snowy days (≥ 0.1 in) | 2.8 | 2.4 | 0.8 | 0.1 | 0.0 | 0.0 | 0.0 | 0.0 | 0.0 | 0.1 | 0.4 | 1.7 | 8.3 |
| Average relative humidity (%) | 71.6 | 71.0 | 68.4 | 64.7 | 67.7 | 67.5 | 70.9 | 72.8 | 73.4 | 69.4 | 71.2 | 74.2 | 70.2 |
| Mean monthly sunshine hours | 143.9 | 149.1 | 201.9 | 232.5 | 283.2 | 317.8 | 321.5 | 304.5 | 250.4 | 223.1 | 145.2 | 128.3 | 2,701.4 |
| Percentage possible sunshine | 47 | 49 | 54 | 59 | 64 | 72 | 71 | 72 | 67 | 64 | 48 | 43 | 61 |
Source: NOAA (relative humidity and sun 1961−1990)

=== Pollution ===
In August 2018, the mayor of Evansville sent a letter to the Ohio River Valley Water Sanitation Commission (ORSANCO) opposing a proposal to eliminate pollution control standards for the Ohio River. Evansville is located downstream from the river's origin. Sources of pollution that affect water quality include agricultural runoff, raw sewage discharges from combined sewer overflows, and toxic chemicals released by companies with water pollution permits. The state of Indiana issues a fish consumption advisory for fish from the Ohio River based on PCB contamination. The recommended consumption limit for most fish, including carp, striped bass, and flathead catfish is no more than 8 ounces (230 g) per month, but for channel catfish, the recommendation drops to 8 oz every two months.

Six very large coal-fired power plant complexes operate within 30 miles (48 km) of Evansville: Indiana Michigan Power's Rockport Generating Station, near Rockport, Indiana; AES Indiana's Petersburg Generating Station near Petersburg; and Duke Energy's Gibson Generating Station near Mount Carmel. Evansville-based Vectren operates the other two: the A. B. Brown Generating Station, located just west of Evansville, and Warrick County Generating Station/F. B. Culley Generating Station complex, east of Newburgh, largely owned by Alcoa. In addition, another coal-fired power plant complex, the R.D. Green Station, operated by Touchstone Energy's Big Rivers Electric, exists 20 miles (32 km) south of Evansville, near Sebree, Kentucky. The levels of fine particles in the air in Vanderburgh County were almost as high as in Manhattan, New York City.

A large portion of the downtown and north side areas were declared contaminated by lead and arsenic because of factory dumping dating back to the Civil War. Contractors have been working for more than 20 years to dig up the lawns of residents to make them safe for children to play. About 18 inches (46 cm) of contaminated dirt is dug up from each yard then dumped in a nearby landfill. The work has many more years to go.

== Demographics ==
Historical population
| Census | Pop. | Note | %± |
|---|---|---|---|
| 1820 | 993 | | — |
| 1830 | 1,120 | | 12.8% |
| 1840 | 3,317 | | 196.2% |
| 1850 | 3,235 | | −2.5% |
| 1860 | 11,484 | | 255.0% |
| 1870 | 21,830 | | 90.1% |
| 1880 | 29,280 | | 34.1% |
| 1890 | 50,756 | | 73.3% |
| 1900 | 59,007 | | 16.3% |
| 1910 | 69,647 | | 18.0% |
| 1920 | 85,264 | | 22.4% |
| 1930 | 102,249 | | 19.9% |
| 1940 | 97,962 | | −4.2% |
| 1950 | 128,636 | | 31.3% |
| 1960 | 141,543 | | 10.0% |
| 1970 | 138,764 | | −2.0% |
| 1980 | 130,496 | | −6.0% |
| 1990 | 126,272 | | −3.2% |
| 2000 | 121,582 | | −3.7% |
| 2010 | 117,429 | | −3.4% |
| 2020 | 117,298 | | −0.1% |
| 2025 (est.) | 116,176 | | −1.0% |
U.S. Decennial Census; 2018 estimate

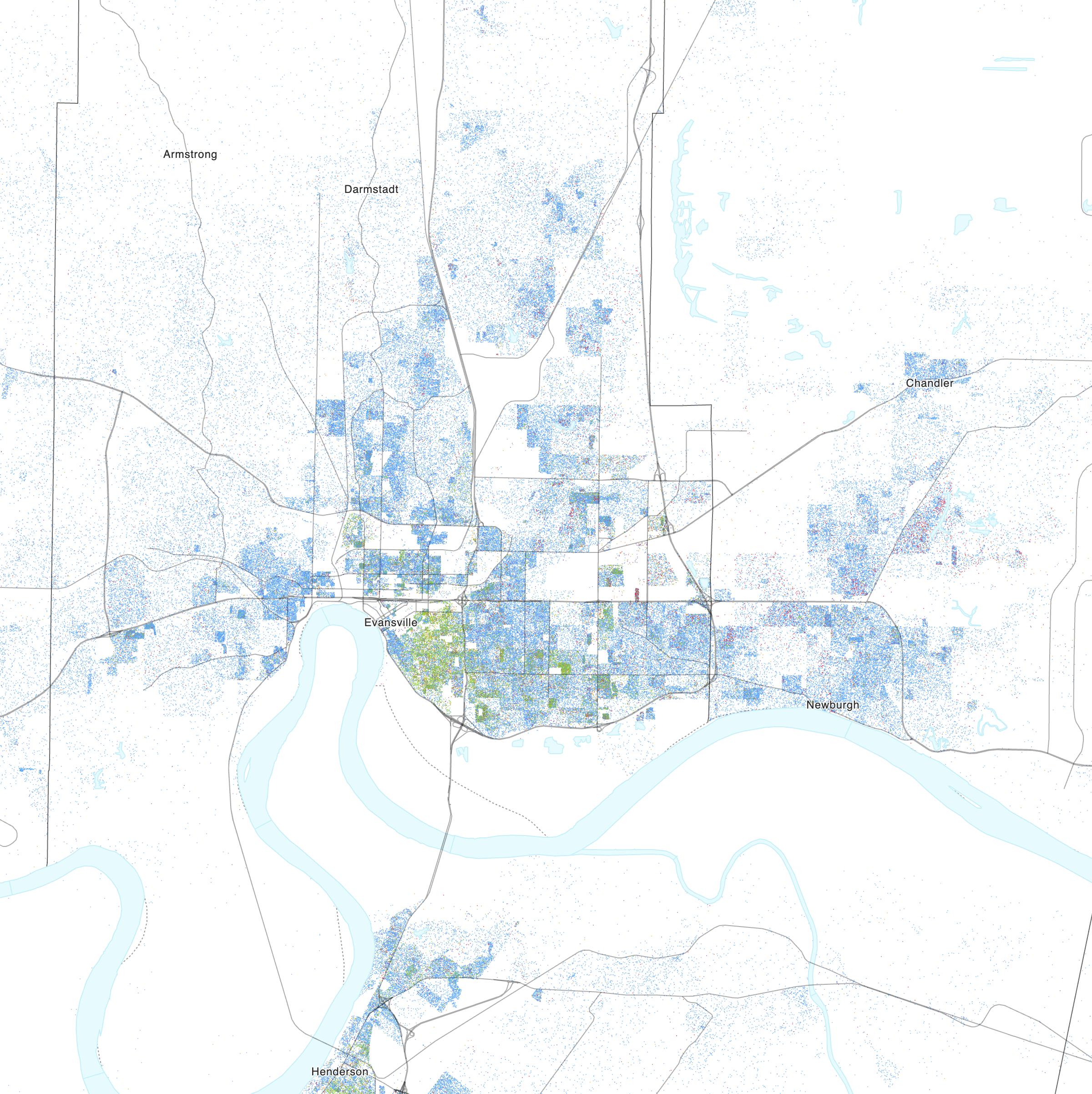
Map of racial distribution in Evansville, 2020 U.S. census. Each dot is one person: ⬤ White ⬤ Black ⬤ Asian ⬤ Hispanic ⬤ Multiracial ⬤ Native American/other

=== 2020 census ===
Evansville, Indiana – racial and ethnic composition Note: the US Census treats Hispanic/Latino as an ethnic category. This table excludes Latinos from the racial categories and assigns them to a separate category. Hispanics/Latinos may be of any race.
| Race / ethnicity (NH = Non-Hispanic) | Pop. 2000 | Pop 2010 | Pop. 2020 | % 2000 | % 2010 | % 2020 |
|---|---|---|---|---|---|---|
| White alone (NH) | 104,066 | 94,961 | 87,008 | 85.59% | 80.87% | 74.18% |
| Black or African American alone (NH) | 13,209 | 14,672 | 15,834 | 10.86% | 12.49% | 13.50% |
| Native American or Alaska Native alone (NH) | 236 | 269 | 273 | 0.19% | 0.23% | 0.23% |
| Asian alone (NH) | 864 | 1,149 | 1,438 | 0.71% | 0.98% | 1.23% |
| Pacific Islander alone (NH) | 49 | 72 | 590 | 0.04% | 0.06% | 0.50% |
| Other race alone (NH) | 227 | 295 | 558 | 0.19% | 0.25% | 0.48% |
| Mixed-race or multiracial (NH) | 1,539 | 2,997 | 6,589 | 1.27% | 2.55% | 5.62% |
| Hispanic or Latino (any race) | 1,392 | 3,014 | 5,008 | 1.14% | 2.57% | 4.27% |
| Total | 121,582 | 117,429 | 117,298 | 100.00% | 100.00% | 100.00% |

The U.S. Census accounts for race by two methodologies. "Race alone" and "Race alone less Hispanics" where Hispanics are delineated separately as if a separate race.

According to the 2020 U.S. census, the racial makeup (including Hispanics in the racial counts) was 75.34% (88,374) White alone, 13.65% (16,006) Black alone, 0.31% (362) Native American alone, 1.24% (1,455) Asian alone, 0.51% (596) Pacific Islander alone, 1.97% (2,315) other race alone, and 6.98% (8,190) multiracial or mixed-race.

The racial and ethnic makeup (where Hispanics are excluded from the racial counts and placed in their own category) was 74.18% (87,008) White alone (non-Hispanic), 13.50% (15,834) Black alone (non-Hispanic), 0.23% (273) Native American alone (non-Hispanic), 1.23% (1,438) Asian alone (non-Hispanic), 0.50% (590) Pacific Islander alone (non-Hispanic), 0.48% (558) other race alone (non-Hispanic), 5.62% (6,589) Multiracial or mixed-race (non-Hispanic), and 4.27% (5,008) Hispanic or Latino.

As of the 2010 census, there were 117,429 people, 50,588 households, and 28,085 families residing in the city. The population density was 2,659.8 inhabitants per square mile (1,027.0/km^{2}). There were 57,799 housing units at an average density of 1,309.2 per square mile (505.5/km^{2}). The racial makeup of the city was 82.0% White, 12.6% African American, 0.3% Native American, 1.0% Asian, 0.1% Pacific Islander, 1.3% from other races, and 2.8% from two or more races. Hispanic or Latino people of any race were 2.6% of the population.

There were 50,588 households, of which 27.6% had children under the age of 18 living with them, 34.8% were married couples living together, 15.6% had a female householder with no husband present, 5.2% had a male householder with no wife present, and 44.5% were non-families. 36.5% of all households were made up of individuals, and 11.9% had someone living alone who was 65 years of age or older. The average household size was 2.23 and the average family size was 2.91.

Median household income was $36,330 (2016), with the per capita income being $21,368 (2016). Poverty level was 21.7%.

The median age in the city was 36.5 years. 22.1% of residents were under the age of 18; 11.7% were between the ages of 18 and 24; 26% were from 25 to 44; 25.8% were from 45 to 64, and 14.4% were 65 years of age or older. The gender makeup of the city was 48.1% male and 51.9% female.

== Economy ==
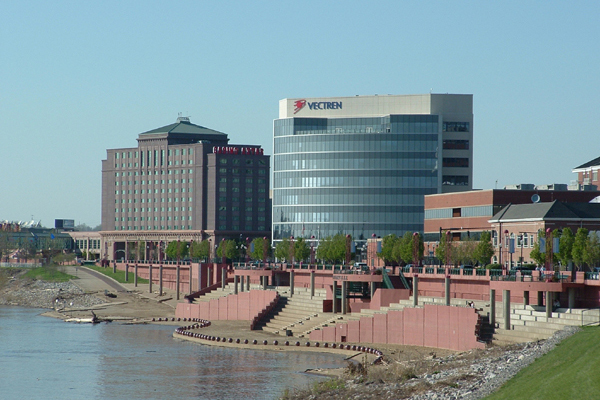
The downtown riverfront area features tiered seating.

Corporate headquarters in Evansville include Accuride, Ameriqual Group, Anchor Industries, Atlas Van Lines, Berry Global, Evana Tool & Engineering, Karges Furniture, Koch Enterprises, Lewis Bakeries, Metronet, Old National Bank, Red Spot Paint & Varnish, Shoe Carnival, OneMain Financial, and Traylor Brothers. Major manufacturing operations near the city include Alcoa in Newburgh, AK Steel in Rockport, SABIC in Mount Vernon, and Toyota in Princeton. Other major employers with workforces of 500 or more in the area include AT&T, Bristol-Myers Squibb, SRG Global, Industrial Contractors, Mead Johnson, Peabody Energy, PGW Pittsburgh Glass, T.J. Maxx, and Bally's Evansville.

Evansville's healthcare centers include Deaconess Health System and Ascension St. Vincent Evansville (formerly St. Mary's Hospital and Medical Center), and the nearby Deaconess Gateway and Women's Hospital.

Chemicals make up 64% of international exports from the metro area, followed by transportation equipment (18%) and food manufacturing (5%).

Evansville is also a regional energy hub because of regional energy-related facilities such as BWX Technologies Nuclear Operations Group, coal mines, Global Blade Technology, several large ethanol and biofuel facilities, and a network of gas and oil pipelines.

Tax credits are given to companies located inside the Evansville urban enterprise zone, established in 1984.

== Arts and culture ==
=== Entertainment venues ===
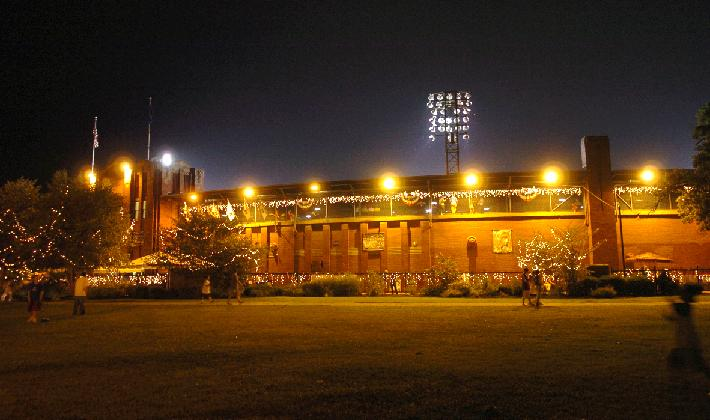
Bosse Field

Bosse Field, a 7,180-seat baseball stadium in Garvin Park, was built in 1915 and is the third-oldest ballpark still in regular use in the United States. It is surpassed only by Fenway Park (1912) in Boston and Wrigley Field (1914) in Chicago.

The Ford Center is a multi-use indoor arena downtown with a maximum seating capacity of 11,000 connected via Sky Bridge to the Evansville DoubleTree Hotel. It officially opened in 2011 and is used mainly for basketball, ice hockey, and music concerts.

A wide variety of concerts, plays, conventions, expositions and other special events are held at the 2,500-seat auditorium and convention center at the Old National Events Plaza downtown.

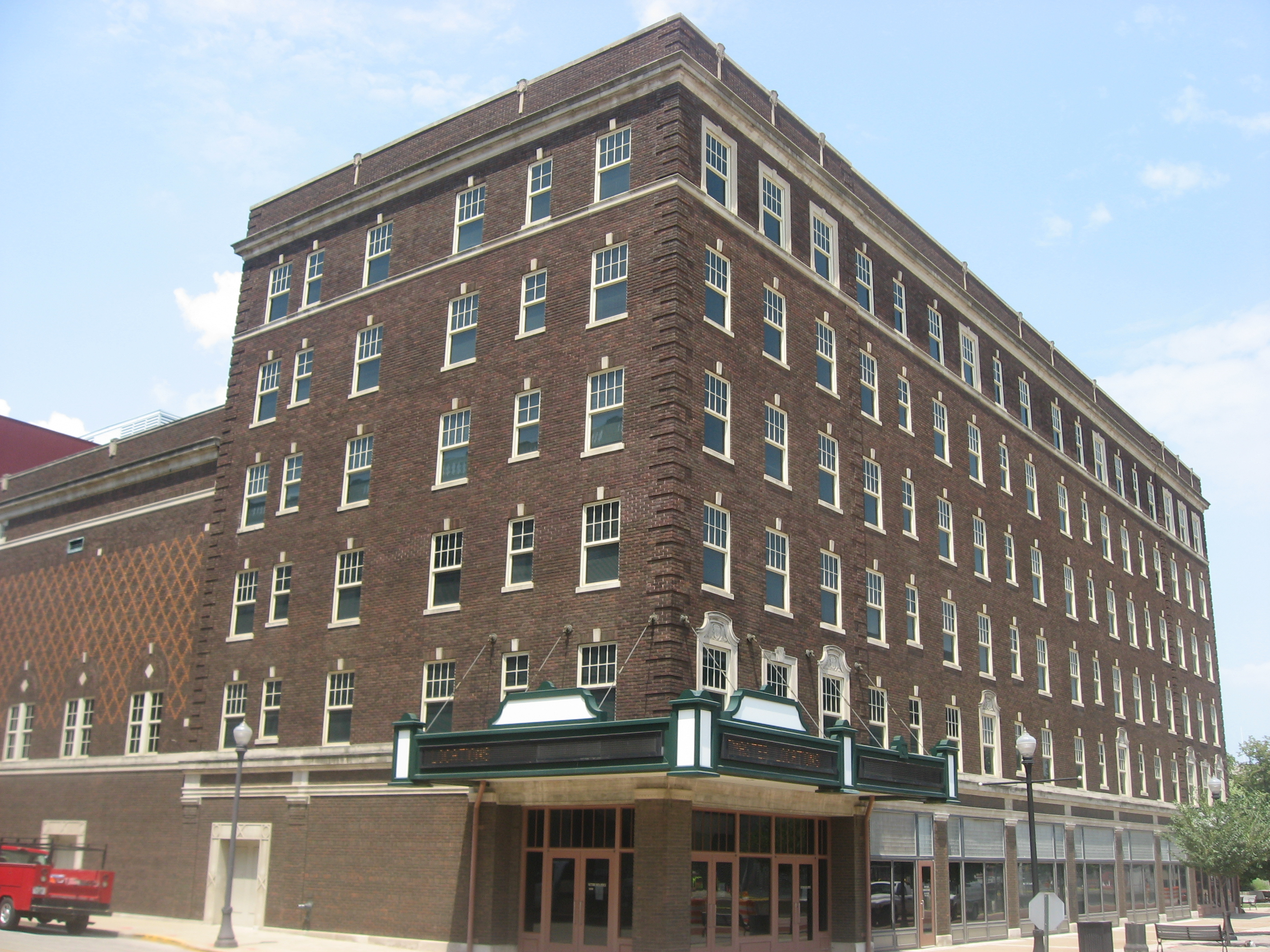
Victory Theatre

Victory Theatre is a vintage 1,950-seat venue that is home to the Evansville Philharmonic Orchestra.

The University of Evansville maintains a theater program, which features four mainstage and two studio productions a year. UE has been honored more times at the Kennedy Center than any other theatre institution. The university is the only institution, along with Yale, which has been asked to perform at the Kennedy Center without first going through competition. It leads the nation in the top awards for its students as awarded by the Broadway Theatre Wing and other governing bodies of serious theatre.

=== Annual festivals ===
West Side Nut Club Fall Festival

The West Side Nut Club Fall Festival is a street fair held in the area west of downtown Evansville. It is held on the first full week of October and draws between 100,000 and 150,000 people each day. The main attraction of the festival is the food, with includes pronto pups, elephant ears, corn dogs, chocolate-covered crickets, fried-brain sandwich, and alligator stew. Paul Harvey remarked only Mardi Gras in New Orleans, Louisiana is larger than the Fall Festival.

The Germania Männerchor Volksfest is a three-day German heritage festival which takes place every August in the historic Germania Mannerchor building on the city's west side. The festival includes food, drink, dance, and music. Many of the city's residents with German ancestry also wear historic German attire. On the last weekend of August, 4,000 hot rods converge on the Vanderburgh County 4-H fairgrounds north of the city for "Frog Follies."

=== Museums ===
Angel Mounds State Park is a well-preserved prehistoric Native American site in Evansville.

The Children's Museum of Evansville opened its doors to the public in September 2006. The museum is the result of two years of planning and was constructed in the historic Central Library downtown. The Art Deco building is listed on the National Register of Historic Places. The museum has three floors of interactive exhibits and galleries.

The Evansville African American Museum was established to continually develop a resource and cultural center to collect, preserve, and educate the public on the history and traditions of African American families, organizations, and communities. The museum is in the last remaining building of Lincoln Gardens, the second federal housing project created under the administration of Franklin D. Roosevelt's New Deal in 1938.

The Evansville Museum of Arts, History, and Science holds the Koch Planetarium, the oldest in Indiana.

In October 2005, the USS LST-325 moored in Evansville and was turned into a museum (USS LST Ship Memorial) in recognition of the city's war effort. During World War II, Evansville produced 167 LSTs (and 35 other craft), making it the largest inland producer of LSTs in the nation. The USS LST-325 is the last navigable tank landing ship in operation.

The Evansville Wartime Museum was opened on the weekend of Memorial Day in 2017. The Museum features exhibits commemorating Evansville's role in the Allied war effort during World War II and other conflicts. These exhibits include the Evansville built P-47 Thunderbolt fighter ‘Hoosier Spirit II’, the operational 1943 Sherman tank ‘Rosie’s Revenge’, other military vehicles and wartime displays.

=== Mesker Park Zoo ===
The Mesker Park Zoo & Botanic Garden opened in 1928 and is one of the oldest and largest zoos in the state. Set in a 50-acre (200,000 m^{2}) park, the zoo features 200 species and more than 700 animals. An estimated 3 million people visit the zoo between April and August every year. Mesker Park Zoo is accredited by the Association of Zoos and Aquariums.

=== Libraries ===
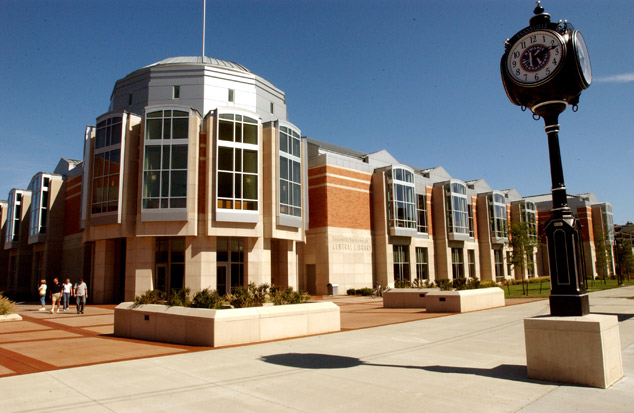
Central Library

Evansville is home to the Evansville Vanderburgh Public Library (EVPL). As a unified system serving both Evansville and the surrounding county, EVPL is one of the largest public library systems in Indiana. It was rated a five star library by the Library Journal, which places it in the top 1% of public libraries in the U.S. EVPL also obtained a Top Ten library ranking in the 2010 edition of Hennen's American Public Library Ratings, achieving a number eight ranking within its population category.

An independent private institution, Willard Library, is also in Evansville. Willard was formed in 1881 to serve the public, regardless of race, a progressive mission in the latter half of the nineteenth century. The library houses local archives and genealogical materials, in addition to its collection of standard publications. The building is constructed in the Gothic Revival style and was listed on the National Register of Historic Places in 1972.

== Sports ==
Evansville is home to two NCAA Division I athletic programs. The Evansville Purple Aces basketball team plays at the Ford Center. The Southern Indiana Screaming Eagles basketball team plays on campus at Screaming Eagles Arena.

Evansville is home to several professional teams as well. The Evansville Otters are a professional baseball team in the Frontier League and have played at Bosse Field since 1995. The Evansville Thunderbolts are a minor league professional ice hockey team in the SPHL and play at the Ford Center. There was also a junior hockey team named the Evansville Jr. Thunderbolts in the NA3HL and played at Swonder Ice Arena from 2015 to 2019. The Evansville Coliseum is home to the WFTDA league, the Demolition City Roller Derby. In 2021, the city saw the formation of two minor league soccer clubs: the Evansville Legends FC and the Midwest Hooligans. The Legends compete in the Ohio Valley Premier League on Old National Bank Field at Goebel Soccer Complex. The Hooligans compete in the United Premier Soccer League and play at Double Cola Soccer Complex near the demolition site of Roberts Stadium.

| Club | Sport | Founded | League | Venue |
|---|---|---|---|---|
| Evansville Otters | Baseball | 1995 | Frontier League | Bosse Field |
| Evansville Thunderbolts | Ice hockey | 2016 | SPHL | Ford Center |
| Evansville Legends FC | Soccer | 2021 | OVPL | Old National Bank Field |
| Midwest Hooligans | Soccer | 2021 | United Premier Soccer League | Double Cola Soccer Complex |

From 1948 to 1956, Evanville hosted an annual college football bowl game, the Refrigerator Bowl.

From 1957 to 1975, and then again in 2002, 2014, 2015, 2019, and from 2021 to 2025 Evansville hosted the NCAA Men's Division II Basketball Championship (Elite Eight). From 1999 to 2007, Roberts Stadium hosted the Great Lakes Valley Conference basketball tournaments, and in 2013, the same event was held at the Ford Center. A number of Division I NCAA events have been hosted by the city as well. In 1983, Roberts Stadium hosted the first round of the NCAA Men's Division I Basketball Championship, and in 1980 and 1983, it hosted the Midwestern City Conference men's basketball conference tournament. The Ford Center has hosted the Ohio Valley Conference men's and women's basketball tournaments since 2018.

Evansville used to play host to the top tier boat racing circuit of H1 Unlimited when it hosted Thunder on the Ohio along the Ohio River in downtown Evansville, which was hosted continuously from 1979 to 2009. Evansville had also previously hosted Thunder on the Ohio from 1938 to 1940. The two-mile Evansville tri-oval was known as one of the fastest hydroplane courses in the world, as various world records were set on the Evansville course. Hydroplane racing returned to Evansville in 2017, with the introduction of the Evansville Hydrofest, an American Power Boat Association event.

The Goebel Soccer Complex is 70 acres (28 ha) and includes nine irrigated Bermuda grass fields and an AstroPlay turf field. Additionally, Double Cola Soccer Complex provides twin soccer fields and stadium seating for the high school regular season and postseason matches. Swonder Ice Arena is a double-rink facility that opened in the fall of 2002 and features a fitness center, a skate park, and party rooms. High schools in the EVSC district used Lloyd Pool for SIAC swimming and diving meets before its shutdown and demolition plans in 2021. The Deaconess Aquatic Center replaced Lloyd as the local hub for swim and dive in October 2021.

Evansville has hosted Drums on the Ohio, a Drum Corps International Summer tour competition at the Reitz Bowl, since 1978 with a brief hiatus from 2008 to 2013. The event normally takes place in June, and draws over 3,000 spectators. It is the only DCI event within a 100-mile radius.

== Parks and recreation ==
Wesselman Woods Nature Preserve is a National Natural Landmark containing approximately 200 acres (0.8 km^{2}) of virgin bottomland hardwood forest, the largest tract of virgin forest inside any city limits in the United States. The Nature Center features exhibits, events, wildlife observation areas, meeting rooms, library, and gift shop. Adjacent to the Nature Preserve, Wesselman Park features a Par 3 golf course, basketball courts, tennis courts, sand volleyball courts, softball fields, and a playground.

Evansville has a municipal park system with 65 parks and 21 facilities. A bicycle and pedestrian trail extend into adjacent counties and links to the American Discovery Trail. This trail system includes the Pigeon Creek Greenway Passage, a 6.75 mi (10.86 km) bicycle and pedestrian trail. The city's operates four public golf courses, two disc golf courses, Garvin Park, Lloyd Pool, the Goebel Soccer Complex, Swonder Ice Arena and the C.K. Newsome Community Center.

Anchored by the Four Freedoms Monument and the Bally's Evansville, Dress Plaza along the riverfront offers a brick paved walkway above, and tiered seating below with a view of the Ohio River.

== Government ==
The mayor of Evansville, Stephanie Terry, serves as the chief executive officer. Cities in Indiana have a mayor–council government providing the mayor with most of the executive and administrative power over the city's daily operations. A nine-member elected city council possesses the legislative and fiscal body of city government. The council's nine members are made up of one representative from each of the city's six council districts and three at-large members. Members are part-time elected officials who serve for four-year terms. As the legislative body, the council possesses the exclusive responsibility of passing or changing local laws. As the fiscal body, the council has the authority to levy certain taxes and it has the sole responsibility of adopting a city budget each year.

| Ward | Member | Took office | Party | Other titles |
|---|---|---|---|---|
| 1 | Ben Trockman | 2020 | Democratic | |
| 2 | Missy Mosby | 2008 | Democratic | |
| 3 | Zachary Heronemus | 2020 | Democratic | |
| 4 | Alex Burton | 2020 | Democratic | President |
| 5 | Angela Koehler Lindsey | 2023 | Republican | |
| 6 | Jim Brinkmeyer | 2016 | Democratic | Vice president |
| At-large | Paul Green | 2024 | Democratic | |
| At-large | Courtney Johnson | 2024 | Democratic | |
| At-large | Mary Allen | 2024 | Democratic | |

The county has eight state trial courts of original jurisdiction, one circuit court and seven superior courts. The judge's offices are non-partisan in terms of six years. A judge must be a member of the Indiana Bar Association. The judges are assisted by magistrates that are appointed. The United States District Court for the Southern District of Indiana maintains a permanent division in the city.

The region is in the 8th District of Indiana and is served by U.S. Representative Mark Messmer.

=== Flag ===
Flag of Evansville, 1962-2024

Flag of Evansville, 2024-present

The flag of Evansville from 1962 to 2024 featured a monochrome gold city seal on a field of blue. In March 2023, four students from the Perry Heights Middle School student government created the Evansville Flag competition, a city-wide competition to create a new flag. The winning design by Darren Wharton features three horizontal stripes, a light blue, a thinner gold, and larger dark blue stripe, with ten stars in the center surrounding a representation of the Four Freedoms Monument, a monument made up of four pillars on the Evansville riverfront. In March 2024, the new flag was made official after being chosen through ranked-choice voting.

== Education ==
=== Higher education ===
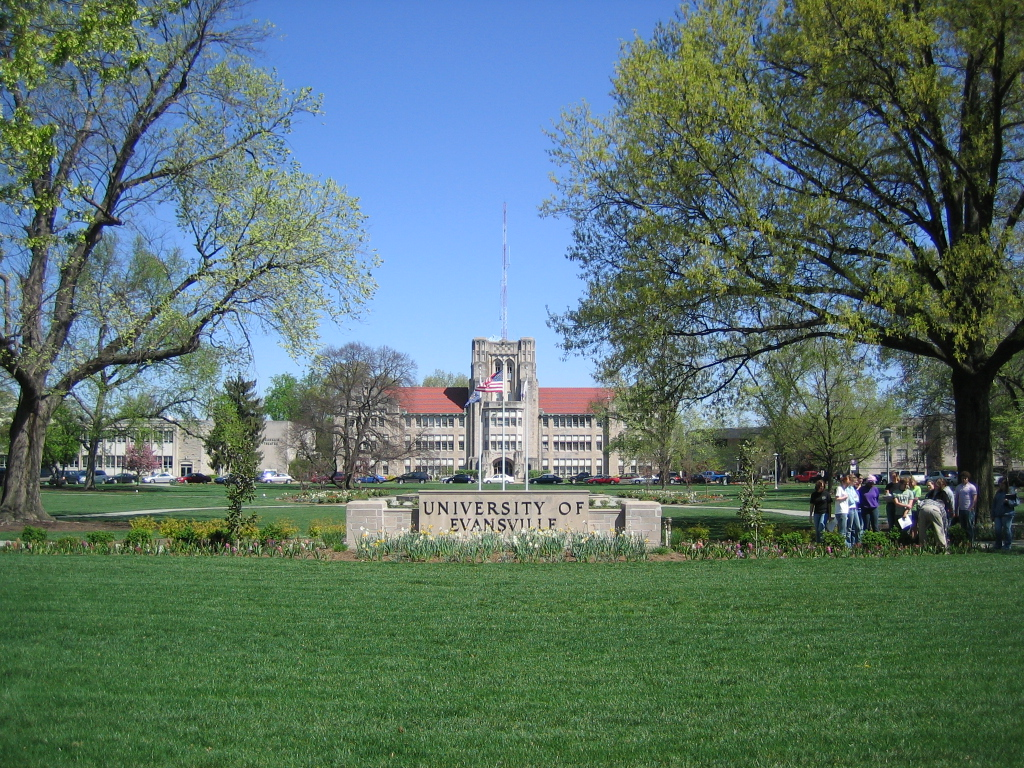
Front oval, University of Evansville

Rice Library, University of Southern Indiana

Evansville is home to several institutions of higher learning. The University of Evansville (UE) is a small, private, Methodist-affiliated university with approximately 3,050 students. Founded in 1854 as the Moores Hill Male and Female Collegiate Institute, UE features liberal arts and science degrees along with a nationally renowned theatre department. Nearly half of UE's students study abroad as part of their experience, including at a satellite campus, Harlaxton College, in Grantham, England. UE's athletic teams, the Purple Aces, participate in the NCAA Division I Missouri Valley Conference.

The University of Southern Indiana (USI) is a public university just outside Evansville's city limits. Founded in 1965 as a satellite campus of Indiana State University, the school has an enrollment of 11,021 students (2019) and is among the fastest growing comprehensive state universities in Indiana. USI's athletic teams, the Screaming Eagles, participate in the NCAA Division I Ohio Valley Conference. The school transitioned to Division I sports in the 2022–2023 school year, having previously been a member of the NCAA Division II Great Lakes Valley Conference.

Evansville's campus of the Ivy Tech Community College System received its charter in 1969 as the Lincolnland Technical Institute. Today it occupies the building of the former Rex Mundi High School on First Avenue.

A branch campus of the Indiana University School of Medicine opened in 1972 on USI's campus; it moved downtown in 2018 into a new interdisciplinary academic health science education and research building (the Stone Family Center for the Health Sciences) in partnerships with UE, USI, and Ivy Tech.

Other campuses in the city include Oakland City University's School of Adult and Extended Learning.

=== Primary and secondary education ===
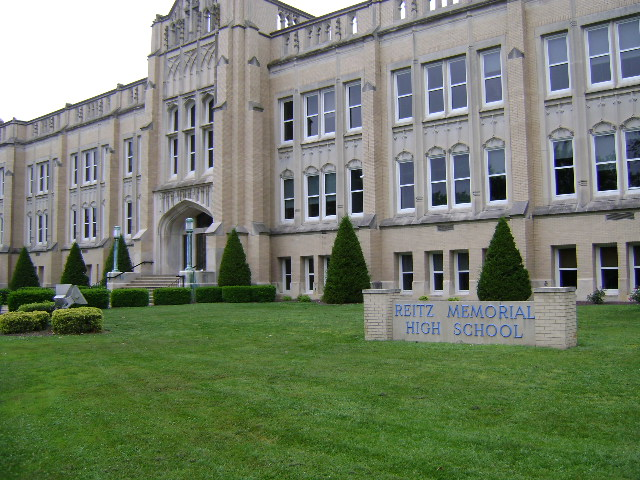
Reitz Memorial High School

The public Evansville Vanderburgh School Corporation (EVSC) consists of five traditional high schools, 11 middle schools, and 20 elementary schools. The EVSC also maintains a fully-online school, an alternative high school for students with individualized educational plans, a trade and technical magnet school that also serves the wider Southwestern Indiana area, and a nontraditional STEM-focused high school.

In addition to the public schools, there are two parochial high schools, one charter higher school, and two private schools. Catholic education is administered by the Roman Catholic Diocese of Evansville.

==== Public schools ====
- Academy for Innovative Studies
- Benjamin Bosse High School
- Central High School
- Francis Joseph Reitz High School
- New Tech Institute
- North High School
- Southern Indiana Career & Technical Center
- Virtual Academy
- William Henry Harrison High School

==== Roman Catholic schools ====
- Mater Dei High School
- Reitz Memorial High School

==== Charter school ====
- Signature School

==== Private schools ====
- Evansville Day School offers grades JPK-12.
- Evansville Christian School offers grades PK-12.

== Media ==
The Evansville Courier & Press, owned by Gannett, serves the Evansville area. The newspaper also publishes the monthly magazines Evansville Business Journal and eWoman Magazine, and it owns the Henderson Gleaner in neighboring Henderson, Kentucky. Evansville Living and Evansville Business, published locally by Tucker Publishing Group, are bi-monthly local magazines showcasing the people, businesses, and communities in the area. Other media publications include Maturity Journal, a free monthly newspaper aimed at senior citizens, and News4U, a free monthly entertainment magazine.

The Evansville area is primarily serviced by radio stations in Indiana and Kentucky. The two main radio groups in Evansville that control the majority of its radio stations are Townsquare Media and Midwest Communications. Radio stations providing coverage to Evansville include: WSWI/820, WGBF/1280, WBGW/1330, WEOA/1400, WABX/107.5, WDKS/106.1, WJPS/107.1, WGBF-FM/103.1, WIKY-FM/104.1, WJLT/105.3, WKDQ/99.5, WLYD/93.5, WNIN-FM/88.3, WSTO/96.1, WBKR/92.5 WJWA/91.5 and WPSR/90.7.

As of the 2022-23 rankings, Evansville is the 106th-largest television market in the United States according to Nielsen Media Research. The designated market area consists of 30 counties in Southeastern Illinois, Southwestern Indiana, and Northwestern Kentucky. The 2010 population estimate of this 30-county region is nearly one million people.

Local Broadcast Television:

| Station | Network affiliation | Virtual channel (PSIP) | Digital channel |
|---|---|---|---|
| WTVW | CW | 7.1 | 22 |
| WTVW | Bounce TV | 7.2 | |
| WTVW | Ion Mystery | 7.3 | |
| WTVW | Ion Television | 7.4 | |
| WNIN | PBS | 9.1 | 9 |
| WNIN | PBS Kids | 9.2 | |
| WFIE | NBC | 14.1 | 26 |
| WFIE | MeTV | 14.2 | |
| WFIE | Circle | 14.3 | |
| WFIE | Grit | 14.4 | |
| WFIE | Dabl | 14.5 | |
| WFIE | True Crime Network | 14.6 | |
| WYYW-CD | Telemundo | 15.1 | 15 |
| WYYW-CD | The Family Channel | 15.2 | |
| WYYW-CD | Retro TV | 15.3 | |
| WTSN-CD | Antenna TV | 20.1 | 20 |
| WTSN-CD | The Family Channel | 20.2 | |
| WEHT | ABC | 25.1 | 12 |
| WEHT | Laff | 25.2 | |
| WEHT | Cozi TV | 25.3 | |
| WEHT | Rewind TV | 25.4 | |
| WEVV-TV | CBS | 44.1 | 28 |
| WEVV-TV | Fox & MyNetworkTV | 44.2 | |

== Infrastructure ==
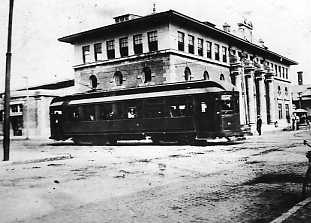
Chicago & Eastern Illinois Depot, active from 1907 to the 1930s

Barge on the Ohio River at Evansville

=== Transportation ===
==== Public transit ====
The local public transit agency in Evansville is the Metropolitan Evansville Transit System.

==== Rail ====
The Evansville and Crawfordsville Railroad was completed in 1853. The Big Four, Illinois Central, and the Southern Railway served the city in early decades of the 20th century. The Chicago & Eastern Illinois closed its station in 1935 and merged its trains into the Louisville and Nashville Railroad station. Evansville's last remaining depot, the L&N station, last had passenger trains in 1971 with unnamed remnants of the Chicago & Eastern Illinois' and the Louisville and Nashville's Georgian: one to St. Louis, and another to Atlanta via Nashville.

Evansville is served by CSX, Evansville Western Railway, the Indiana Southwestern Railway, and the Norfolk Southern Railway.

==== Airport ====
Evansville is home to Evansville Regional Airport, which is located on the northern edge of the city.

=== Utilities ===
Electricity and natural gas are both provided to Evansville by CenterPoint Energy. Water and sewer services are provided by the Evansville Water & Sewer Utility. The Ohio River provides for most of the city's source of drinking water, and 60 million gallons of water is drawn and filtered from the river daily.

=== Police ===
From 1818 to 1847, law enforcement was administered by the Warrick County sheriff, and from 1847 to 1863, the city marshal shared policing duties with the police department. In 1863, the Evansville Police Department was founded.

== In popular culture ==
=== Film and television ===
Game scenes in the 1992 film A League of Their Own were filmed at Bosse Field. It is the third oldest baseball stadium still in use in the United States (behind Fenway Park in Boston and Wrigley Field in Chicago). The ballpark served as the homefield for the Racine Belles. Scenes from the 2014 Michael Rosenbaum movie Back in the Day feature Green River Road in Evansville.

All exterior shots on the 1988–2018 sitcom Roseanne are still photographs taken in and around Evansville. The Conners' house is at 619 South Runnymeade Avenue, and the Lobo Lounge is a pizzeria at the corner of Edgar and Louisiana Streets. Matt Williams, one of the show's producers, is a native of Evansville and a graduate of The University of Evansville theatre program. He is a co-founder of Wind Dancer Productions and has been involved with numerous sitcoms such as 'Home Improvement', movies and dramatic plays for Broadway.

The Daily Show has featured Evansville in two episodes. The first featured a story about comedian Carrot Top's reopening of the historic Victory Theatre. The second poked fun at former mayor Russell Lloyd Jr. for skipping out on a city meeting to attend Cher's Farewell Tour concert being performed on the same night at Roberts Stadium.

Evansville was also featured in Alton Brown's series Feasting on Asphalt. Alton and his crew visited the historic Greyhound Bus station for its vending machines, the YWCA tea room for lunch, and the Hilltop Inn for a brain sandwich and burgoo. Other shows have included Ghost Hunters which investigated Willard Library's "Gray Lady" ghost and Storm Stories on The Weather Channel documenting the devastating tornado that struck the city in 2005. The city was briefly mentioned in the opening of the 2007 Prison Break episode "Chicago". In 2012, Evansville was featured on the British television program Supersize vs Superskinny because of a poll that ranked the residents of the city as the most obese in the United States.

Evansville and neighboring Newburgh was the featured location for the feature film Back in the Day filmed in 2014.

Evansville is mentioned several times in the third and fourth seasons of the HBO series Boardwalk Empire.

In 2021, an episode of HBO's "We're Here" was filmed in Evansville.

=== Literary media ===
Evansville is featured in a section of Vladimir Nabokov's 1955 novel Lolita, as well as Walker Percy's 1962 novel The Moviegoer, and Robert Silverberg's 1969 science fiction novel To Live Again.

Evansville is the primary location in the historical fiction novel Invitation to Valhalla, by Mike Whicker, published in 2004. The novel is based on the records of German spy Erika Lehmann's attempt to infiltrate the LST shipyards during WWII.

An Evansville couple is the focus of Hungarian Rhapsody: An Adoption Story, by James Derk, based on a series of stories in the Evansville Courier & Press.

Evansville, under the name Vansul, appears as a slapstick satire in the post-apocalyptic novel Light of the Ancient Sun.

Evansville is the hometown of the protagonist, Jack Crabb, in Thomas Berger's 1964 book Little Big Man. This is not mentioned in the 1970 film adaptation.

== Sister cities ==
Evansville has three sister cities, as designated by Sister Cities International (SCI):

- Osnabrück, Lower Saxony, Germany
- Tizimín, Yucatán, Mexico
- Tochigi City, Japan
