= To Live Again (novel) =

1969 novel by Robert Silverberg

- Cover of first edition (hardcover)
- Author: Robert Silverberg
- Cover artist: Pat Steir
- Language: English
- Genre: Science fiction
- Publisher: Doubleday
- Publication date: 1969
- Publication place: United States
- Media type: Print (hardback & paperback)
- Pages: 231

To Live Again is a 1969 science fiction novel by American writer Robert Silverberg.

== Plot introduction ==
The book describes a world where all great scientists, economists, thinkers, builders and so on can store a "backup" of their personality (if they can afford the expensive procedure). Most of those who can afford it record their personality once every six months.

These personalities can then be transplanted (upon the person's actual death) to other people, "living" alongside the Host, providing him or her with a new insight on life, and on their field of expertise. As the possession of extra personalities can be a mark of prestige, it has become fashionable in high society to buy and possess as many personalities as they have money for. Occasionally, the personalities of strong minded individuals can overwhelm the personalities of their hosts, resulting in the destruction of the host body's personality. The personality is said to have gone "dybbuk".

== Reception ==
Algis Budrys, finding the novel "genuinely mov[ing]" despite being indifferently crafted, concluded that it succeeded because "the very best parts of this book are the unwritten ones, the ones that play on the good old half-buried fears and longings, the love-death pushme-pullyou that drives men in the old, old quest whose byproduct is power." Sidney Coleman reviewed the novel favorably, saying "At the close of To Live Again, his characters are in various postures of triumph or defeat, but they are convinced they have lived life to the fullest, and have striven after that which is worth the striving. Only the reader is left in horrid fascination, as if he had just witnessed feeding time at the cannibal cage." Thomas D. Clareson's monograph on Silverberg does not treat it as a major novel, and does not discuss it.
