= Signature School =

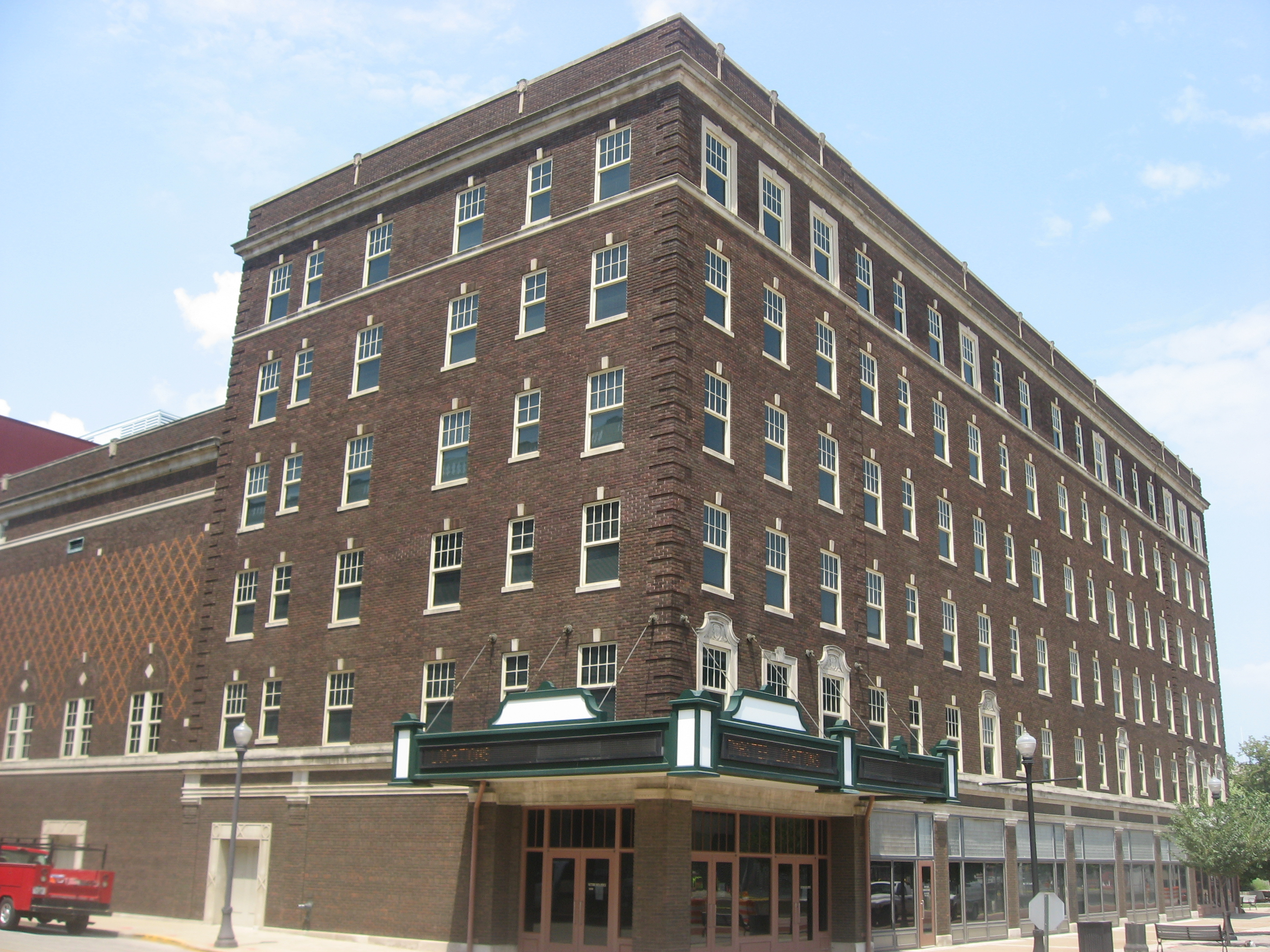
- Front and southwestern side of Signature School

Location
- 610 Main Street; Evansville, Indiana 47708; United States; 37.972998°N 87.568655°W

Information
- Type: Charter high school
- Established: 1992 (as a half day program), 2002 (as a full day school)
- School district: Independent
- Executive Director: Jean Hitchcock
- Faculty: 38
- Teaching staff: 29.00 (FTE)
- Grades: 9–12
- Enrollment: 378 (2023-24)
- Student to teacher ratio: 13.03
- Campus type: Urban
- Color
- Slogan: Globally focused. Nationally recognized. Locally connected.
- Athletics conference: Independent
- Sports: Independent
- Nickname: Penguins
- Newspaper: The Signal
- Yearbook: The Album
- Website: Official website

Signature School is a public charter high school located in downtown Evansville, Indiana, United States, on the Main Street walkway. The school opened in 2002 as Indiana's first public charter high school.

== Profile ==
Signature School is part of the International Baccalaureate (IB) Programme. Many classes offer a combination of both AP and IB credits. Foreign languages offered at the school include French, German, and Spanish. The student-to-teacher ratio is 14 to 1.

Community service is a part of the mission of Signature School. All students are required to perform more than 100 hours of service to their school, local, and global communities. The class of 2021 logged 9,367 hours in four years.

== Rankings ==
In 2017, the Washington Post named Signature “the third most challenging high school in the U.S.". U.S. News & World Report ranked the school the 21st best public high school in the U.S., the sixth best charter, and number one school in the Midwest in 2013. The Daily Beast named Signature the 5th best high school in America in its list entitled "Top High Schools 2014". In addition, Signature School has been declared a Blue Ribbon School.

In 2010 and 2011, Newsweek ranked the school as the seventh best in the United States. In 2011, the Washington Post ranked the school the eighth best in the United States. Out of about 22,000 high schools nationwide, U.S. News & World Report ranked the school the 53rd best in 2011.

Previous Newsweek rankings have declared Signature 54th (2006), 99th (2008), 27th (2009), 7th (2010), and 7th (2011). Other Washington Post rankings of the school include 126th (2007), 97th (2008), 23rd (2009), 7th (2010), and 8th (2011).

In 2020, Signature was named the #1 Most Challenging School in the Nation according to the Jay Mathews Challenge Index.

In 2023, Signature made history by being ranked the #2 best high school and #1 best charter high school in the nation by U.S. News & World Report. The same year, Signature was ranked the #1 most challenging high school in the nation by the Jay Mathews Challenge Index.

In 2026, Signature boasts #2 best high school and #1 best charter high school in the nation by U.S. News & World Report.

== Campus ==
Signature School is located in several buildings in downtown Evansville, Indiana on the Main Street walkway. These include the fourth floor of the Victory Theatre, the Robert L. Koch II Science Building, and the YMCA (for PE classes). The school's main building is attached to the Victory Theatre. The building that now occupies Signature School was once known as the “Hotel Sonntag” and was later renovated into the high school.

In 2015, Signature School received $2.5 million in funding for the building of the new science center as part of the Regional Cities Initiative. The Regional Cities Initiative aims to help communities across Indiana transform their regions into nationally recognized destinations to live, work, and play.
