= John Garty =

New Zealand cricketer

Personal information
- Born: 6 January 1864; Mount Grey, Canterbury, New Zealand
- Died: 28 January 1897 (aged 33); Sydney, Australia
- Role: Bowler

Domestic team information
- Years: Team
- 1886-87: Canterbury

Career statistics
Competition	First-class
Matches	1
Runs scored	10
Batting average	10.00
100s/50s	0/0
Top score	10
Balls bowled	217
Wickets	7
Bowling average	10.00
5 wickets in innings	1
10 wickets in match	0
Best bowling	6/41
Catches/stumpings	1/–
- Source: Cricinfo, 9 May 2020

John Garty (6 January 1864 – 28 January 1897) was a New Zealand cricketer who played one match of first-class cricket for Canterbury in 1886–87.

Garty "came with a meteoric flash as a bowler" with one outstanding performance, then lost form. He was among the 24 players from whom Canterbury selected their 18 to play the touring Australians in November 1886, but was not ultimately chosen. He was in good form in senior club cricket later that season, including 7 for 42 off 75 deliveries for Midland against Grange.

Garty opened the bowling for Canterbury in their annual first-class match against Otago in February 1887 at Lancaster Park. At one stage early on the first day of the match Otago were 10 for 4, and Garty had taken all four wickets for one run. The Lyttelton Times wrote of the play at this stage: "Garty was bowling with a good length, and most of his deliveries kept very low and puzzled the Otago men a good deal." Garty bowled throughout the Otago innings, taking figures of 35.1–14–41–6 (four-ball overs) and Otago, batting one man short, were dismissed for 80. He took one wicket in the second innings, and Canterbury won by 10 wickets. He never played for Canterbury again.

Before he died Garty had been unwell for some time, and went to Sydney in 1896, dying there of "galloping consumption" in January 1897.
