= List of power stations in Indiana =

Sources of Indiana utility-scale electricity generation in gigawatt-hours, full-year 2025:
1. Coal: 49,314 (44.9%)
2. Natural gas: 39,778 (36.2%)
3. Wind: 10,309 (9.39%)
4. Solar: 6,730 (6.13%)
5. Other gases: 2,536 (2.31%)
6. Hydroelectric: 352 (0.32%)
7. Petroleum: 177 (0.16%)
8. Biomass: 176 (0.16%)
9. Other: 391 (0.36%)

This is a list of electricity-generating power stations in the U.S. state of Indiana, sorted by type and name. In 2024, Indiana had a total summer capacity of 27.8 GW through all of its power plants, and a net generation of 997,013 GWh. In 2025, the electrical energy generation mix was 44.9% coal, 36.2% natural gas, 9.4% wind, 6.1% solar, 2.3% other gases, 0.3% hydroelectric, 0.2% petroleum, 0.2% biomass, and 0.4% other.

GridInfo maintains a directory of power plants in Indiana using data from the U.S. Energy Information Administration.

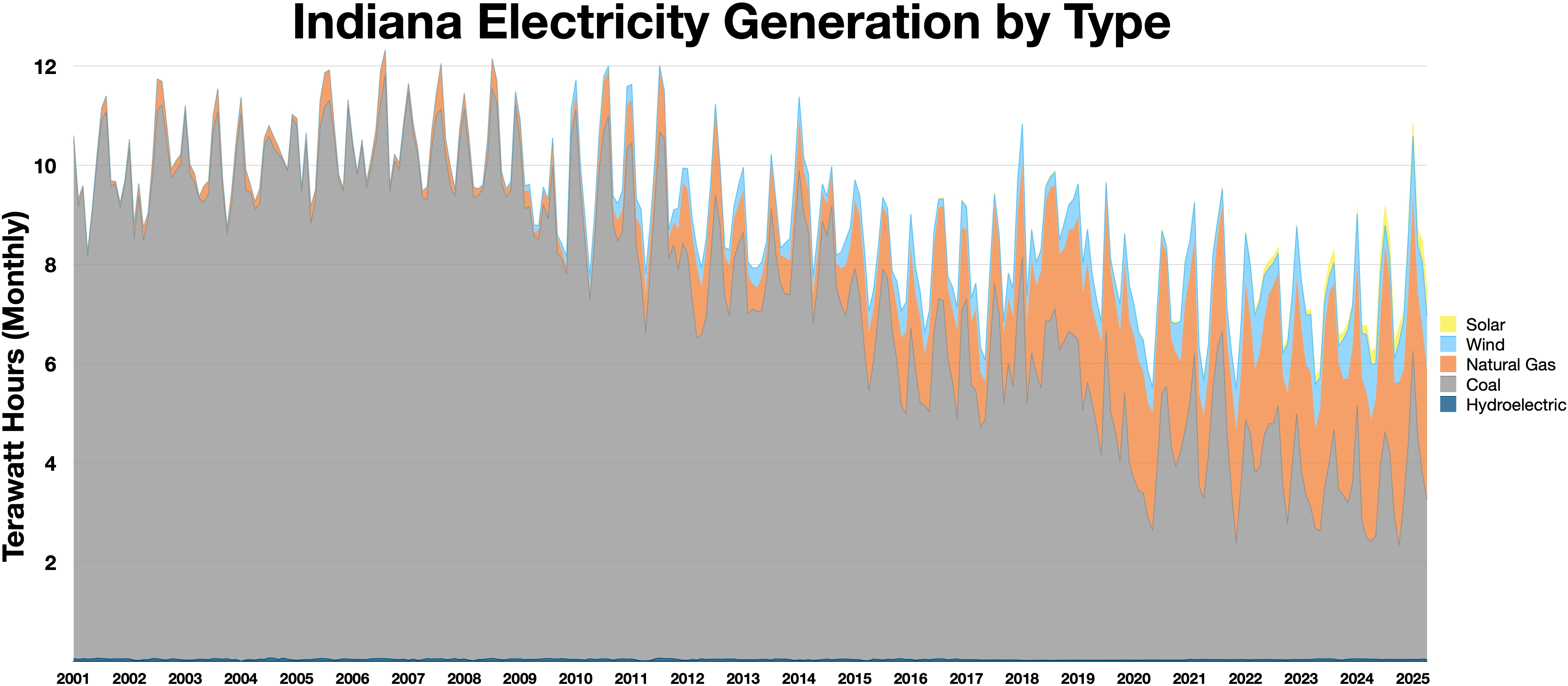
Indiana electricity generation by type

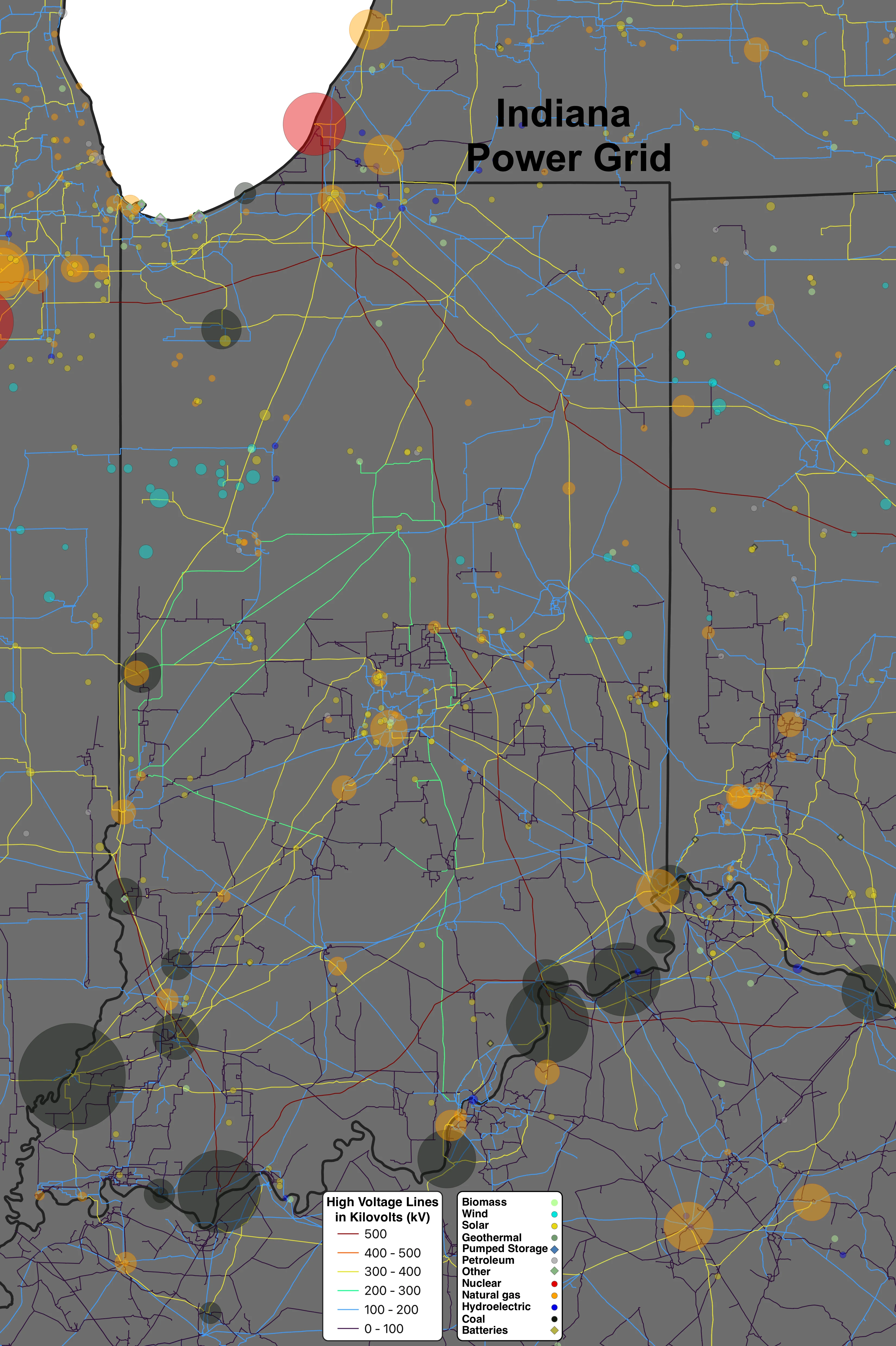
Indiana power grid

== Coal-fired ==
Name	Location	Act. units	Stacks	In service dates	Unit capacity (2009)	Nameplate capacity (2009 MW)	Owner type	Owner(s) (2009)	Closure date
A.B. Brown	Posey Co. / Vand. Co.	4	4	1 1979 2 1986; 3 1991 4 2002	1 & 2 265 MW; 3 & 4 88.2 MW	707	Large corporation	Vectren	
Cayuga	Cayuga	2	3	1 1970; 2 1972	1 531 MW; 2 531 MW	1,062	Large corporation	Duke Energy Indiana	2028
Clifty; Creek	Madison	6	3	1-5 1955; 6 1956	All 6: 217 MW	1,303	Conglomerate	Ohio Valley E.C.	
Crawfordsville; Mun.	Crawfordsville	3	3	1 1955; 2 1965 3 1994 (petroleum)	1 11.5 MW; 2 12.6 MW 3 0.8 MW	19.5 (2021)	City utility	Crawfordsville E.L.&P.	2021 (unit 2)
F.B. Culley	Newburgh	2	3	1 1955 2 1966; 3 1973	1 46 MW 2 104 MW; 3 265 MW	369 (2021)	Large corporation	Vectren	2006 (Unit 1); 2025 (Unit 2)
Gibson	Northwestern; Gibson County	5	4	1 & 2 1976; 3 & 4 1979 5 1982	All 5: 667 MW	3,339 (2021)	Large corporation, franchised	D.E.I. 100%1-4 90.3% 5 See Gibson G.S. for details	2026 (Unit 4); 2034 (Units 3 & 5); 2038 (Units 1 & 2)
Logansport	Logansport	2	1	1 1958; 2 1964	1 18 MW; 2 25 MW	43	City utility	Logansport Municipal Utility	
Merom	Merom	2	1	1 1982; 2 1983	Both: 540 MW	1,080	Large corporation	Hallador Energy Company	
Michigan; City	Michigan City	1	1	1974	540 MW	540	Large corporation	NIPSCO	2028
Petersburg	Petersburg	7	4	1 1967 IC1-3 1967 2 1969; 3 1977 4 1986	1 282 MW IC1-3 2.7 MW 2 523 MW; 3 & 4 671 MW	2,155 (2021)	Large corporation	AES / AES Indiana	2021 (Unit 1) 2023 (Unit 2)
Rockport	Rockport	2	2	1 1984; 2 1989	Both: 1,300 MW	2,600	Large corporation	Indiana - Michigan Power	2028 (Unit 1); 2028 (Unit 2)
R.M. Schahfer	Wheatfield	6	6	14 1976 15 1979; 3 1983 4 1986	14 540 MW 15 556 MW; 3 & 4 423 MW	2,201 (2021)	Large corporation	NIPSCO	Units 14 and 15 closed in October 2021. 2023 (Units 17 and 18).
Warrick	Newburgh	4	3	1 1960 2 1964; 3 1965 4 1970	1, 2, & 3 144 MW; 4 323 MW	755	95% franchised	Vectren to Alcoa's; Newburgh Smelter	
Whitewater; Valley	Richmond	2	1	1 1955; 2 1973	1 33.0 MW; 2 60.9 MW	93.9	City utility	Richmond Power & Light	
Totals:	15 plants	46	72	-------	-------	21,402.5	-------	16 utility corps 1 co-op consortium 2 universities 1 smelter	

Closed/converted
Name	Location	In service dates	Unit capacity	Nameplate capacity	Owner type	Owner(s)	Closure date
Bailly	Chesterton	1 1962 2 1968	1 190 MW 2 413 MW	604	Large corporation	NIPSCO	2018
Breed	Fairbanks Twp, Sullivan Co, Indiana	1960	496 MW		Large Corporation	Indiana - Michigan Power	1994
Eagle Valley	Martinsville	1 1951; 2 & 3 1953 4 1956	1 50 MW; 2 & 3 69 MW 4 114 MW	302	Large corporation	AES / AES Indiana	Converted to natural gas in 2018.
Gallagher	New Albany	1 1958 2 1959 3 1960 4 1961	2 & 4 280 MW	600	Large corporation	Duke Energy Indiana	2012 (Units 1 & 3) 2021 (Units 2 & 4)
Harding St./(former E.W. Stout)	South Side Indianapolis	1 1958 2 1961 3 1973 4 2001	1 & 2 114 MW 3 & 4 471 MW	1,170	Large corporation	AES Indiana	Converted to natural gas in 2016.
Jasper Mun.	Jasper	1968	14.5 MW	14.5	City utility	Jasper M.E.U.	
D.H. Mitchell	Gary	1 & 2 1958 3 1970	All 3 128 MW	384	Large corporation	NIPSCO	2001
Frank E. Ratts	Petersburg	Both 1970	Both 117 MW	233	R.E.M.C.	Hoosier Energy	2015
State Line	Hammond	1 & 2 1955 3 & 4 1962	1 100MW 2 125MW 3 180MW 4 209MW	614	Large corporation	Dominion	1978 (unit 1) 1979 (unit 2) 2012 (units 3 & 4)
Tanner's Creek	Lawrenceburg	1 1951 2 1952 3 1954 4 1964	1 & 2: 153 MW 3 215 MW 4 580 MW	1,100	Large corporation	Indiana - Michigan Power	2015
Notre Dame Utility Plant	University of Notre Dame	1 1952 2 1956 3 1962 4 1967 5 2000	1 1.7 MW 2 2.0 MW 3 3.0 MW 4 5.0 MW 5 9.5 MW	21.1	College utility	University of Notre Dame	2019
Wabash River	Terre Haute	2-4 1955 5 1956 6 1968 7 1995	2-4 85 MW 5 95 MW 6 318 MW	680	Large corporation	Duke Energy Indiana	2016
Wade Utility Plant	Purdue University	1 1969 2 1995	1 10.6 MW 2 30.8 MW	43.2	College utility	Purdue University	2012 (Unit 1) Converted to natural gas in 2012 (Unit 2)

- 1 Also includes cooling towers.
- 0 active units indicates decommissioned stations.

== Coal gasification ==
Name	Location	Act. units	Stacks	In service dates	Unit capacity (2009)	Nameplate capacity	Owner type	Owner(s) (2009)
Wabash River; IGCC	Terre Haute	2	1	1 - 1995; 2 - 1955 (repowered)	1 192 MW; 2 68 MW (steam)	260 MW	Corporation	Wabash Valley Power Authority
Edwardsport; IGCC	Edwardsport	3	2	2012	1 & 2 260 MW; 3 260 MW	780 MW	Joint owned	Duke Energy Indiana; Vectren

1 The existing plant will be decommissioned and demolished upon completion of new IGCC facility.

== Oil-fired peaking stations ==
- Connersville Peaking Station
- Miami-Wabash County Peaking Station
- Wheatland Peaking Station

== Natural gas fired ==
Name	Location	Type	In service dates	Unit capacity (2014)	Nameplate capacity	Owner type	Owner(s) (2014)	Source(s)
Anderson Generating Station	Anderson	Peaking	1 & 2 - 1992; 3 - 2004	1 & 2 41 MW; 3 85 MW	167 MW	Municipal holding company	Indiana Municipal Power Agency	
Broadway Generating Station (Indiana)	Evansville	Peaking	1 - 1971; 2 - 1981	1 50 MW; 2 65 MW	115 MW	Large corporation	Vectren	
Eagle Valley	Martinsville		2018		671 MW	Large corporation	AES / AES Indiana	
Georgetown Generating Station								
Henry County Generating Station	Henry County	Peaking	2001		84 MW	Large corporation	Duke Energy	
Lawrence County Generating Station	Lawrence County	Peaking	2005		258 MW	Rural electric cooperative	Hoosier Energy, Wabash Valley Power Association	
Lawrenceburg Energy Facility								
Montpelier Electric Generating Station (Indiana)								
Noblesville Station	Noblesville, Indiana	Combined cycle	1950		310 MW	Large corporation	Duke Energy	
Northeast Generating Station (Indiana)								
Perry K.	Downtown; Indianapolis		1 1925 (coal); 2 1938 (coal); 1 2016 (natural gas); 2 2016 (natural gas)	1 15.0 MW; 2 5.0 MW	20.0	Small corporation	Citizens Energy Group	
Portside Energy Facility								
Richmond Generating Station (Indiana)								
St. Joseph Energy Center	St. Joseph County	Combined cycle	2018		720 MW	Rural electric cooperatives	Hoosier Energy, Wabash Valley Power Alliance	
Vermillion Generating Facility	Vermillion County	Peaking	2000		692 MW	Large corporation, rural electric cooperative	Duke Energy Indiana, Wabash Valley Power Alliance	
Wheatland Generating Facility	Knox County	Peaking	2000		512 MW	Large corporation	Duke Energy	
Whiting Clean Energy Power Plant								
Worthington Generating Station	Greene County	Peaking	2000		174 MW	Rural electric cooperative	Hoosier Energy	

== Hydroelectric dams ==
Name	Location	Coordinates	In service date	Nameplate capacity	Owner type	Owner(s)	Operator(s)
Markland Locks and Dam	Gallatin County, Kentucky / York Township, Switzerland County, Indiana	38°46′29″N, 84°57′51″W	1964	72.9 MW	Corporation	Duke Energy Indiana	United States Army Corps of Engineers Louisville District
Norway Dam (Indiana)	Monticello, Indiana	40°46'50"N, 86°45'36"W	1923	9.2 MW	Corporation	Northern Indiana Public Service Company (NIPSCO)	
Oakdale Dam (Indiana)	Monticello, Indiana	40°39'23.75"N, 86°45'11.30"W	1925	7.2 MW	Corporation	Northern Indiana Public Service Company (NIPSCO)	
Twin Branch Dam (Indiana)	Mishawaka, Indiana	41°39'56"N, 86°7'57"W	1989	4.8 MW	Corporation	Indiana Michigan Power	
Elkhart Dam (Indiana)	Elkhart County, Indiana	41°41'34.90"N, 85°57'54.65"W	1913	3.4 MW	Corporation	Indiana Michigan Power	

== Wind farms ==
The following table of wind farms and utility-scale wind power developments uses data from the AWEA, the State of Indiana, and other sources. For the larger projects constructed in phases, the table lists separate information for each phase. The name of each wind farm is the one used by the energy company when referring to it. The "wind farm" suffix is implied and hence removed for brevity. For more details and references for each wind farm, see its article.

Wind farm	County(s)	Coordinates	Turbine model	Power per turbine (MW)	No. of turbines	Total nameplate capacity (MW)	Online	Developer	Operator	Power purchaser
Benton County phase I	Benton		GE sl/sle Gen4	1.5	87	130.5	2008-04	Orion Energy	Orion Energy	Duke, Vectren
Black River	Gibson, Posey				65	(proposed)				
Fowler Ridge phase I Vestas	Benton		Vestas V82	1.65	182	300.3	2009-04	BP, Dominion	BP, Dominion	AEP, Dominion
Fowler Ridge phase I Clipper	Benton		Clipper 2.5	2.5	40	100	2009-04	BP, Dominion	BP, Dominion	AEP, Dominion
Fowler Ridge phase II	Benton		GE sl/sle Gen4	1.5	133	199.5	2009-12	BP, Dominion	BP, Dominion	AEP, Vectren
Headwaters	Randolph		Vestas V110	2	100	200	2014-12	EDP Renewables North America	EDP Renewables North America	Indiana Michigan Power
Headwaters II	Randolph		13 x Vestas 136 36 x Vestas 150	3.6/4.2	49	198	2021	EDP Renewables North America	EDP Renewables North America	
Hoosier	Benton		REpower	2	53	106	2009-08	IPL, enXco	IPL, enXco	IPL
Indiana Crossroads I	White		Vestas V150	4.2	72	302.4	2021-12	EDP Renewables North America, NIPSCO	EDP Renewables North America, NIPSCO	
Indiana Crossroads II	White		Nordex N155	4.8	42	201.6	2023-12	EDP Renewables North America, NIPSCO	EDP Renewables North America, NIPSCO	
Jordan Creek	Benton, Warren		GE 2.3, 2.52, 2.6, 2.82	2.3, 2.52, 2.6, 2.82	146	398.68	2020-12	NextEra	NextEra	NIPSCO
Meadow Lake phase I	White		Vestas V82	1.65	121	199.65	2009-10	Horizon Wind Energy	EDP Renewables North America	AEP, wholesale market
Meadow Lake phase II	White		Acciona	1.5	66	99	2010-06	Horizon Wind Energy	EDP Renewables North America	
Meadow Lake phase III	White		GE	1.5	69	103.5	2010-10	Horizon Wind Energy	EDP Renewables North America	
Meadow Lake phase IV	White		Suzlon	2.1	47	98.7	2010-10	Horizon Wind Energy	EDP Renewables North America	
Prairie Breeze	Tipton			1.6	94	(cancelled)		Juwi		
Rosewater	White		VestasV136 and V150	3.6 and 4.2	25	102	2020-11	NiSource	EDP Renewables North America/NIPSCO	NIPSCO
Union City/Randolph Eastern School Corporation	Randolph		Nordic Windpower	1	2	2	2010-02	Performance Services	Union City, Randolph Eastern School Corporation	AEP
Wildcat phase I	Madison, Tipton		GE	1.6	125	200	2012-10	E.ON	E.ON	AEP
Wildcat phase II	Grant, Howard				40–60	(proposed)		E.ON		
Wildcat phase III	Tipton				40–75	(proposed)		E.ON		
Wildcat phase IV	Tipton					(proposed)		E.ON		

== Solar ==
As of December 31, 2025

Largest projects
Name	Location	In service dates	Nameplate capacity	Owner(s)
Bellflower Solar Project	Henry County	2023	152.5 MW	Lightsource bp
Cavalry	White County	2024	200 MW	NIPSCO
Dunns Bridge 1	Jasper County	2023	265 MW	NIPSCO
Hardy Hills	Clinton County	2024	195 MW	AES
Honeysuckle	New Carlisle	2024	188 MWdc	Lightsource bp
Indiana Crossroads	White County	2023	200 MW	NIPSCO
Mammoth North	Starke County	2024	400 MWdc	Doral Renewables
Mammoth South	Pulaski County	2026	300 MWdc	Doral Renewables
Mammoth Central	Pulaski County	2026	900 MWdc	Doral Renewables
Riverstart Solar Park	Modoc	2021	200 MW	Connor Clark & Lunn Infrastructure (80%); EDP Renewables North America (20%)

Solar Facilities in Indiana (Central Indiana)
#	Plant Name	Utility Name	County	Capacity (MW)	Operating Year
1	Anderson 3	Indiana Municipal Power Agency	Madison	8.7	2021
2	Anderson 4	Indiana Municipal Power Agency	Madison	7.8	2021
3	Anderson 5	Indiana Municipal Power Agency	Madison	3.0	2021
4	Anderson 6	Indiana Municipal Power Agency	Madison	6.8	2022
5	Bellflower Solar 1	Lightsource Renewable Energy Asset Management, LLC	Henry	152.5	2023
6	Belmont	Marion Solar LLC	Marion	3.8	2015
7	C&B Graham Energy, LLC	SolRiver Capital LLC	Hendricks	7.0	2023
8	Camp Atterbury Microgrid Hybrid	Duke Energy Indiana, LLC	Johnson	2.0	2019
9	Centerville Solar Park	Indiana Municipal Power Agency	Wayne	1.1	2020
10	Crawfordsville 2 Solar Park	Indiana Municipal Power Agency	Montgomery	7.9	2019
11	Crawfordsville 3 Solar Park	Indiana Municipal Power Agency	Montgomery	4.8	2019
12	Crawfordsville 5 Solar Park	Indiana Municipal Power Agency	Montgomery	9.8	2020
13	Crawfordsville Solar Park 4	Indiana Municipal Power Agency	Montgomery	2.3	2020
14	Crossroads Solar (IN)	Crossroads Solar, LLC - (IN)	Fountain	200.0	2025
15	Deer Creek PV	Indiana Michigan Power Co	Grant	2.5	2016
16	Duke Building 129	Concord New Energy	Marion	3.4	2014
17	Duke Building 87	Concord New Energy	Marion	2.7	2014
18	Duke Building 98	Concord New Energy	Marion	2.7	2014
19	Ellettsville Solar RES	Hoosier Energy R E C, Inc	Monroe	1.1	2016
20	Gas City 2	Indiana Municipal Power Agency	Grant	1.8	2023
21	Gas City Solar Park	Indiana Municipal Power Agency	Grant	2.5	2020
22	Greenfield Solar Park	Indiana Municipal Power Agency	Hancock	2.8	2017
23	Hardy Hills Solar Energy LLC	Hardy Hills Solar LLC	Clinton	195.0	2024
24	IMPA Anderson Solar Park	Indiana Municipal Power Agency	Madison	5.0	2017
25	IMPA Anderson Solar Park 2	Indiana Municipal Power Agency	Madison	8.1	2017
26	IMPA Crawfordsville Solar Park	Indiana Municipal Power Agency	Montgomery	3.0	2015
27	IMPA Frankton Solar Park	Indiana Municipal Power Agency	Madison	1.0	2014
28	IMPA Knightstown Solar Park	Indiana Municipal Power Agency	Henry	1.4	2023
29	IMPA Middletown Solar Park	Indiana Municipal Power Agency	Henry	1.4	2023
30	IMPA Pendleton Solar Park	Indiana Municipal Power Agency	Madison	2.0	2015
31	IMPA Richmond 8 Solar Park	Indiana Municipal Power Agency	Wayne	6.1	2024
32	IMPA Richmond Solar Park	Indiana Municipal Power Agency	Wayne	1.0	2014
33	IMPA Richmond Solar Park 7	Indiana Municipal Power Agency	Wayne	4.4	2023
34	IMPA Tipton 2 Solar Park	Indiana Municipal Power Agency	Tipton	2.7	2025
35	IMPA Veedersburg Solar Park	Indiana Municipal Power Agency	Fountain	1.4	2025
36	IND Community Solar Farm 1st Phase	Terraform Arcadia	Marion	10.0	2013
37	IND Solar Farm (Phase IIA)	Terraform Arcadia	Marion	7.5	2014
38	INDY III	Terraform Arcadia	Marion	2.5	2015
39	Indianapolis Motor Speedway Solar PV	Boralex US Operations LLC	Marion	9.0	2014
40	Indy Grocers	Terraform Arcadia	Marion	1.0	2015
41	Indy Solar I, LLC	Onward Energy	Marion	10.0	2013
42	Indy Solar II, LLC	Onward Energy	Marion	10.1	2013
43	Indy Solar III, LLC	Onward Energy	Marion	8.6	2013
44	Johnson Co. Solar RES	Hoosier Energy R E C, Inc	Johnson	1.1	2016
45	Kokomo Solar 1, LLC	NJR Clean Energy Ventures Corporation	Howard	5.4	2016
46	Lenape II	Lenape Solar II, LLC	Marion	4.0	2015
47	M. G. Emmett J. Bean Federal Center	U.S. General Services Administration	Marion	1.9	2011
48	Marion Solar LNG	Marion Solar LLC	Marion	1.5	2015
49	Maywood Photovoltaic Project	ENI New Energy US Inc	Marion	8.0	2014
50	McDonald Solar Farm, LLC	Cypress Creek Renewables	Vigo	5.2	2015
51	New Castle Solar RES	Hoosier Energy R E C, Inc	Henry	1.1	2016
52	Pastime Farm, LLC	Cypress Creek Renewables	Clay	5.2	2015
53	Richmond 5	Indiana Municipal Power Agency	Wayne	9.0	2021
54	Richmond 6	Indiana Municipal Power Agency	Wayne	5.3	2023
55	Richmond Solar Park 3	Indiana Municipal Power Agency	Wayne	6.5	2019
56	Richmond Solar Park 4	Indiana Municipal Power Agency	Wayne	7.1	2020
57	Richmond Solar Site 2	Indiana Municipal Power Agency	Wayne	7.4	2018
58	Riverstart Solar Park III	Riverstart Solar Park III LLC	Randolph	100.0	2024
59	Riverstart Solar Park IV	Riverstart Solar Park IV LLC	Randolph	150.0	2025
60	Riverstart Solar Park LLC	Riverstart Solar Park LLC	Randolph	200.0	2021
61	Rockville Solar I LLC	CleanCapital Holdings	Marion	2.8	2014
62	Rockville Solar II, LLC	CleanCapital Holdings	Marion	2.7	2014
63	Sheridan School Corporation Solar	Johnson Melloh Solutions	Hamilton	1.5	2016
64	Speedway Solar, LLC	Speedway Solar, LLC	Shelby	199.0	2025
65	Staunton	Cypress Creek Renewables	Clay	4.0	2018
66	Tippecanoe Solar Power Plant	Duke Energy Indiana, LLC	Tippecanoe	1.6	2019
67	Tipton Solar Park	Indiana Municipal Power Agency	Tipton	5.3	2019

Solar Facilities in Indiana (Northern Indiana)
#	Plant Name	Utility Name	County	Capacity (MW)	Operating Year
1	Appleseed Solar	Appleseed Solar, LLC	Cass	200.0	2025
2	Auburn Renewables LLC	Auburn Renewables, LLC	DeKalb	11.0	2022
3	Bremen	Indiana Municipal Power Agency	Marshall	6.8	2022
4	Cavalry Solar Hybrid	Cavalry Energy Center LLC	White	200.0	2024
5	Columbia City Solar Park	Indiana Municipal Power Agency	Whitley	4.3	2021
6	Dunns Bridge I Solar	Dunns Bridge Solar Center LLC	Jasper	265.0	2023
7	Dunns Bridge II Solar	Dunns Bridge II Solar and Storage Generation LLC	Starke	435.0	2025
8	East Chicago	Altus Power America Management, LLC	Lake	2.0	2013
9	Griffith	Altus Power America Management, LLC	Lake	2.0	2013
10	Hobart Solar, LLC	AES Distributed Energy	Lake	1.0	2012
11	Honeysuckle Solar Farm	Lightsource Renewable Energy Asset Management, LLC	St. Joseph	150.0	2024
12	IMPA Peru Solar Park	Indiana Municipal Power Agency	Miami	3.0	2015
13	IMPA Rensselaer Solar Park	Indiana Municipal Power Agency	Jasper	1.0	2014
14	IMPA Winamac Solar Park	Indiana Municipal Power Agency	Pulaski	3.3	2025
15	Indiana Crossroads Solar Park	Meadow Lake Solar Park	White	200.0	2023
16	Jasper County Solar Project	Biscayne Falls SPV, LLC	Jasper	60.0	2025
17	Lincoln Solar	Ecos Energy LLC	Lake	1.5	2012
18	Logansport Solar	Cardinal Renewables	Cass	16.0	2021
19	Mammoth North Solar	Mammoth North, LLC	Starke	400.0	2024
20	Middlebury Solar	Ecos Energy LLC	Elkhart	1.5	2012
21	OlivePV	Indiana Michigan Power Co	St. Joseph	5.0	2016
22	Peru 2	Indiana Municipal Power Agency	Miami	9.5	2021
23	Peru 3	Indiana Municipal Power Agency	Miami	2.9	2022
24	Portage Solar	Ecos Energy LLC	Porter	1.5	2012
25	Rensselaer Solar Site 2	Indiana Municipal Power Agency	Jasper	3.8	2018
26	St. Joseph Solar	Indiana Michigan Power Co	St. Joseph	20.0	2021
27	Twin Branch PV	Indiana Michigan Power Co	St. Joseph	2.6	2016
28	Twin Lakes Solar LLC	Twin Lakes Solar LLC	White	150.0	2024
29	Valparaiso Solar, LLC	AES Distributed Energy	Porter	1.0	2012
30	Walkerton	Indiana Municipal Power Agency	St. Joseph	1.1	2022
31	Waterloo Solar, LLC	AES Distributed Energy	DeKalb	1.0	2012

Solar Facilities in Indiana (Southern Indiana)
#	Plant Name	Utility Name	County	Capacity (MW)	Operating Year
1	Crane Solar Facility	Duke Energy Indiana, LLC	Martin	17.0	2017
2	Decatur Co. Solar RES (IN)	Hoosier Energy R E C, Inc	Decatur	1.1	2017
3	Fairbanks Solar Project	Fairbanks Solar Energy Center LLC	Sullivan	250.0	2025
4	Gibson Solar	Gibson Solar, LLC	Gibson	200.0	2025
5	Heirloom Solar	Heirloom Solar (Ratts 1 Phase 2 Solar, LLC)	Pike	60.0	2025
6	Henryville Solar RES	Hoosier Energy R E C, Inc	Clark	1.1	2016
7	IMPA Huntingburg Solar Park	Indiana Municipal Power Agency	Dubois	2.0	2016
8	IMPA Tell City Solar Park	Indiana Municipal Power Agency	Perry	1.1	2015
9	IMPA Washington Solar Park	Indiana Municipal Power Agency	Daviess	4.0	2016
10	IMPA Washington Solar Park 2	Indiana Municipal Power Agency	Daviess	9.9	2023
11	Jackson Co. Solar RES	Hoosier Energy R E C, Inc	Jackson	1.1	2017
12	Lanesville Solar RES	Hoosier Energy R E C, Inc	Harrison	1.1	2015
13	Linton	Indiana Municipal Power Agency	Greene	5.4	2022
14	New Haven Solar RES	Hoosier Energy R E C, Inc	Spencer	1.1	2016
15	Oak Hill Solar Array	Southern Indiana Gas & Elec Co	Vanderburgh	2.0	2018
16	Posey Solar	Southern Indiana Gas & Elec Co	Posey	190.8	2025
17	RATTS 1	Ratts 1 Solar LLC	Pike	150.0	2025
18	Scotland Solar RES	Hoosier Energy R E C, Inc	Greene	1.1	2015
19	Scottsburg Solar Park	Indiana Municipal Power Agency	Scott	7.1	2020
20	Spring Mill Solar RES	Hoosier Energy R E C, Inc	Lawrence	1.1	2017
21	Sullivan Solar, LLC	Cypress Creek Renewables	Sullivan	5.2	2016
22	Tell City Solar Park	Indiana Municipal Power Agency	Perry	3.2	2020
23	Troy Solar	Southern Indiana Gas & Elec Co	Spencer	50.4	2021
24	Volkman Road Solar Array Hybrid	Southern Indiana Gas & Elec Co	Vanderburgh	2.0	2018

== Biomass to energy plant ==
- Milltown Biomass

== Attempted nuclear plants ==
- Marble Hill Nuclear Power Plant
- Bailly Nuclear Power Plant

== Operating electrical utility companies ==
- AES Indiana, a subsidiary of AES Corporation
- CenterPoint Energy
- Duke Energy Indiana, a subsidiary of Duke Energy
- Indiana Michigan Power (I&M), a subsidiary of American Electric Power
- Northern Indiana Public Service Company (NIPSCO), a subsidiary of NiSource
