= Solar power in Indiana =

Overview of solar power in the U.S. state of Indiana

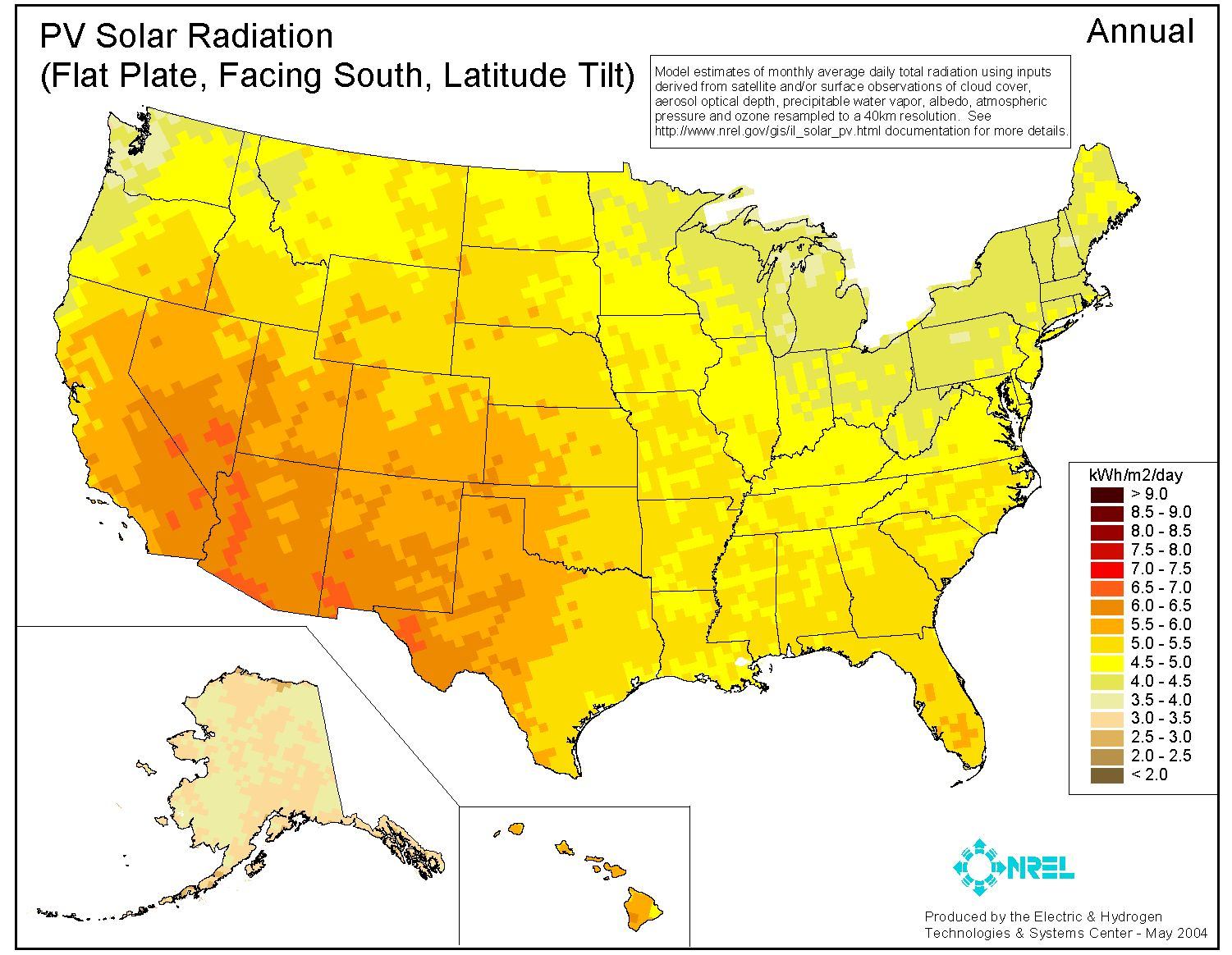
US annual average solar energy received by a latitude tilt photovoltaic cell (modeled)

Solar power in Indiana has been growing in recent years due to new technological improvements and a variety of regulatory actions and financial incentives, particularly a 30% federal tax credit for any size project.

As of 2026, Indiana ranked 11th among U.S. states for installed solar power with 6.5 GW of photovoltaic panels, up from 18th place with 136 MW in 2015. The state nearly doubled its installed capacity in 2025, installing the third most capacity that year.

An estimated 18% of electricity in Indiana could be provided by rooftop solar panels.

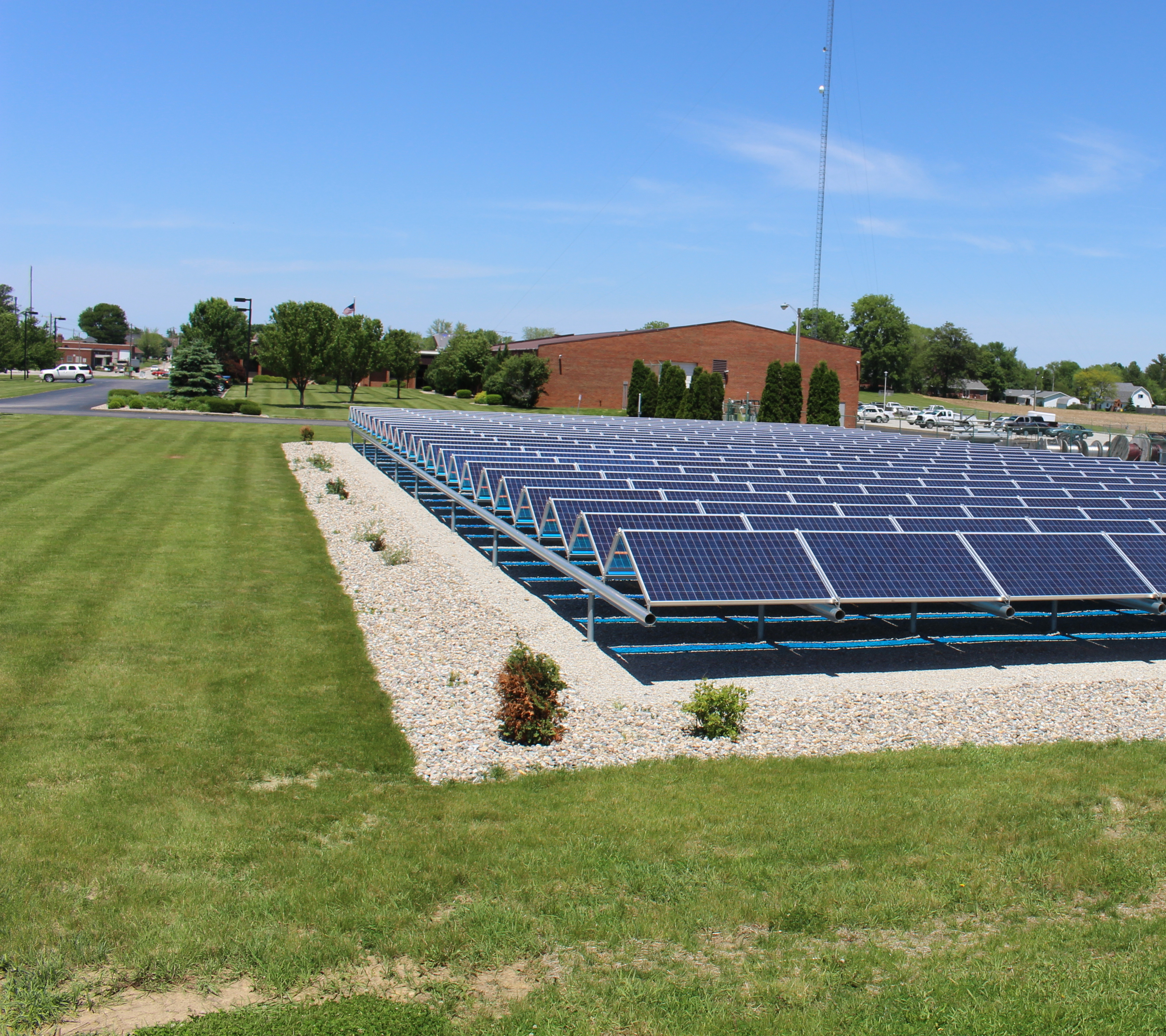
Community Solar Array, Linden

A 17.5MW plant built at the Indianapolis airport in 2013 was the largest airport solar farm in the U.S. A 9MW solar farm was built at the Indianapolis Motor Speedway in 2014.

The Mammoth Solar project in Northwest Indiana broke ground in October 2021, and when complete it will be the largest solar project in the United States, with more than 2.8 million panels producing more than 1 gigawatt of power. The first 400 MW phase was completed in July 2024.

== Government policy ==
The Government of Indiana has taken a variety of actions in order to encourage solar energy use within the state.

=== Net metering ===
The state eliminated its net metering program in 2022.

=== Feed-in tariff ===
Indiana's Northern Indiana Public Service Company, NIPSCO, offers a feed-in tariff of $0.30/kWh for systems from 5 to 10 kW, and $0.26/kWh for systems from 10 kW to 2 MW. AES Indiana has a Renewable Energy Production program that pays $0.24/kWh for solar from 20 kW to 100 kW and $0.20/kWh for solar arrays of from 100 kW to 10 MW. Payments are for 15 years, participation is limited, and one third of the program, 45,900 MWh/year, will be made available through a reverse auction. No new applications will be accepted beyond March 2013.

=== Indiana Solar Energy Working Group ===
The Indiana Office of Energy Development has created the Indiana Solar Energy Working Group to promote the development of solar energy, including local manufacturing.

== Statistics ==
=== Installed capacity ===
Source: NREL

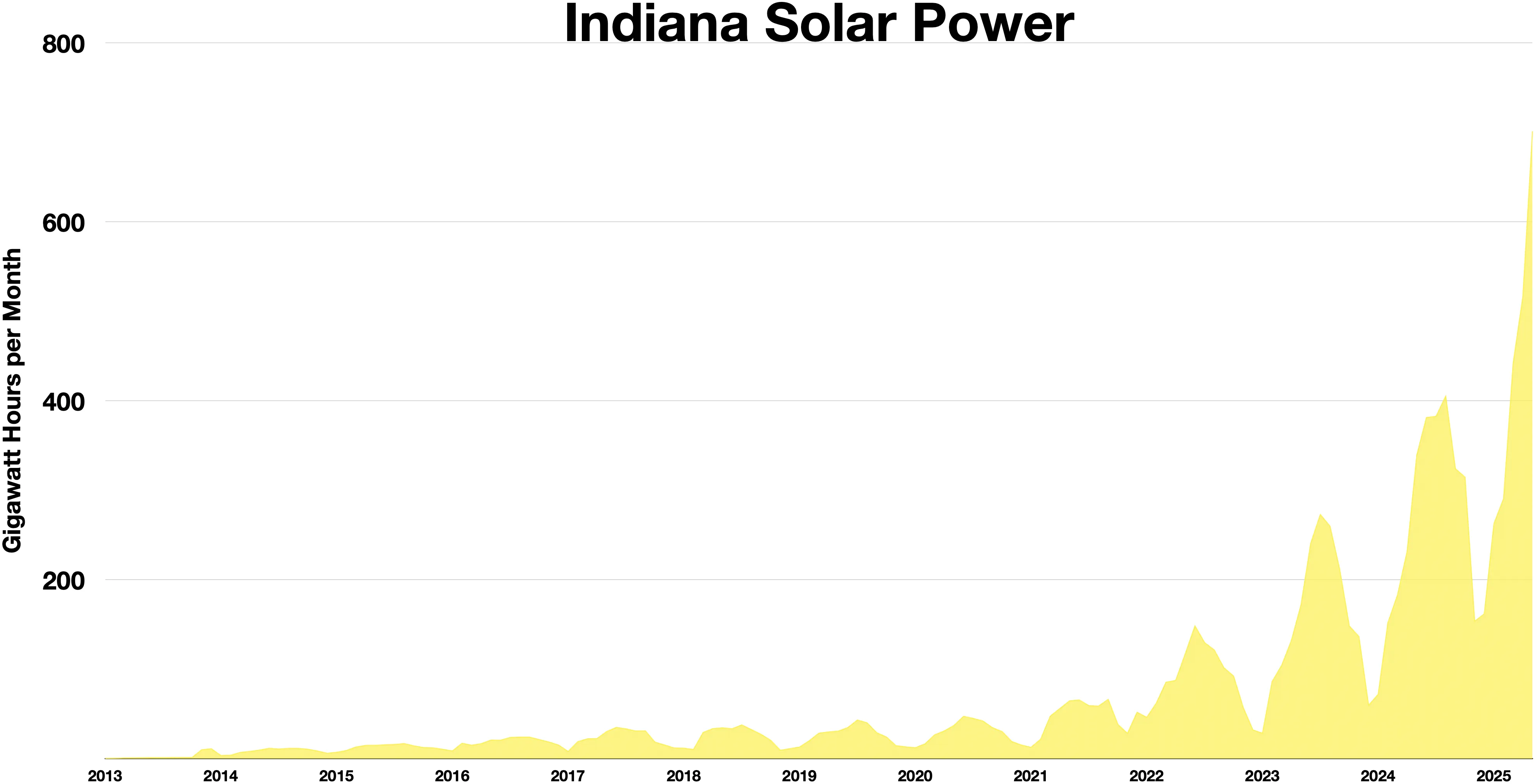
Indiana solar power from 2013 to 2025

Grid-connected PV capacity (MWp)
| Year | Capacity | Installed | % change |
|---|---|---|---|
| 2009 | 0.3 | 0.3 | >200% |
| 2010 | 0.5 | 0.2 | 67% |
| 2011 | 3.5 | 3 | 600% |
| 2012 | 4.4 | 0.9 | 26% |
| 2013 | 49.4 | 45 | 1022% |
| 2014 | 112 | 59 | 111% |
| 2015 | 136 | 24 | 21% |
| 2016 | 217 | 81 | 60% |
| 2017 | 280 | 63 | 29% |
| 2018 | 327 | 47 | 16.7% |
| 2019 | 420 | 93 | 28.4% |
| 2020 | 473.3 | 53.3 | 12.6% |
| 2021 | 1,618.8 | 1,145.5 | % |
| 2022 | 1,640 | 21.2 | % |

=== Utility-scale generation ===
Utility-scale solar generation in Indiana (GWh)
| Year | Total | Jan | Feb | Mar | Apr | May | Jun | Jul | Aug | Sep | Oct | Nov | Dec |
|---|---|---|---|---|---|---|---|---|---|---|---|---|---|
| 2013 | 29 | 0 | 0 | 1 | 1 | 1 | 1 | 1 | 1 | 1 | 1 | 10 | 11 |
| 2014 | 103 | 3 | 4 | 7 | 8 | 10 | 12 | 11 | 11 | 11 | 11 | 9 | 6 |
| 2015 | 155 | 7 | 9 | 13 | 15 | 15 | 15 | 16 | 17 | 14 | 12 | 12 | 10 |
| 2016 | 227 | 9 | 17 | 15 | 17 | 21 | 21 | 24 | 24 | 24 | 21 | 19 | 15 |
| 2017 | 276 | 8 | 19 | 22 | 22 | 30 | 35 | 33 | 31 | 31 | 18 | 15 | 12 |
| 2018 | 290 | 12 | 10 | 29 | 34 | 34 | 33 | 38 | 32 | 27 | 21 | 9 | 11 |
| 2019 | 322 | 13 | 20 | 29 | 30 | 31 | 35 | 43 | 40 | 29 | 24 | 15 | 13 |
| 2020 | 358 | 12 | 17 | 27 | 31 | 37 | 48 | 45 | 42 | 35 | 30 | 19 | 15 |
| 2021 | 532 | 24 | 25 | 45 | 63 | 71 | 69 | 68 | 69 | 68 | 52 | 47 | 68 |
| 2022 | 1,162 | 60 | 72 | 94 | 101 | 121 | 142 | 131 | 122 | 110 | 100 | 64 | 45 |
| 2023 | 243 | 47 | 86 | 110 | | | | | | | | | |

== Major projects ==
| Name | Location | In service dates | Nameplate capacity | Owner(s) |
|---|---|---|---|---|
| Bellflower Solar Project | Henry County | 2023 | 152.5 MW | Lightsource bp |
| Cavalry | White County | 2024 | 200 MW | NIPSCO |
| Dunns Bridge 1 | Jasper County | 2023 | 265 MW | NIPSCO |
| Hardy Hills | Clinton County | 2024 | 195 MW | AES |
| Honeysuckle | New Carlisle | 2024 | 188 MWdc | Lightsource bp |
| Indiana Crossroads | White County | 2023 | 200 MW | NIPSCO |
| Mammoth North | Starke County | 2024 | 400 MWdc | Doral Renewables |
| Mammoth South | Pulaski County | 2026 | 300 MWdc | Doral Renewables |
| Mammoth Central | Pulaski County | 2026 | 900 MWdc | Doral Renewables |
| Riverstart Solar Park | Modoc | 2021 | 200 MW | Connor Clark & Lunn Infrastructure (80%); EDP Renewables North America (20%) |

== See also ==
- Wind power in Indiana
- Solar power in the United States
- Renewable energy in the United States
