= Frank E. Ratts Generating Station =

Power station in Indiana, United States

- Country: United States
- Location: Washington Township, Pike County, near Petersburg, Indiana
- Coordinates: 38°31′12″N 87°16′02″W
- Status: Demolished
- Commission date: Both: 1970
- Decommission date: March 2015
- Owner: Hoosier Energy

Thermal power station
- Primary fuel: Bituminous coal
- Turbine technology: Steam turbine
- Cooling source: White River

Power generation
- Nameplate capacity: 250 MWe
- Indiana's First REMC-Owned Plant

Frank E. Ratts Generating Station was Indiana's first electric cooperative power plant, located on the White River near Petersburg in Pike County, Indiana. It was 1 mile (1.6 km) downstream from the larger coal-fired Petersburg Generating Station. Ratts Generating Station was rated to produce 250 MW of electricity with two turbine generators that began commercial operation in 1970. It was owned by Hoosier Energy.

Rising eight stories above the ground, the Ratts Station stood on a foundation that was an acre of concrete 4 feet (1.2 m) thick, extending to a depth of 6 feet (1.8 m) beneath the turbine generators and boilers. In addition to two concrete stacks, each 300 feet (91 m) high, the generating station was equipped with environmental controls and monitors; these included updated precipitators for the removal of fly ash to protect the air quality.

Most of the fuel for the facility was mined within a radius of 20 miles (32 km).

On December 29, 2014, Unit 2 of Frank E. Ratts facilities was shut down per consent decree.

== Legal settlement ==
In July 2010 an agreement was reached between the EPA and Hoosier Energy to reduce emissions that are regulated under the Clean Air Act. The agreement covers a civil penalty and a commitment to upgrade the air pollution at two power plants in Indiana, Merom Generating Station, and Frank E. Ratts Generating Station.

Per consent decree the Frank E. Ratts station was closed and idled/shut down completely. It was torn down during late 2016 and early 2017 and the site has been graded and seeded.

== See also ==
- List of power stations in Indiana
- Global warming
