= A. B. Brown Generating Station =

Power plant in Posey County, Indiana

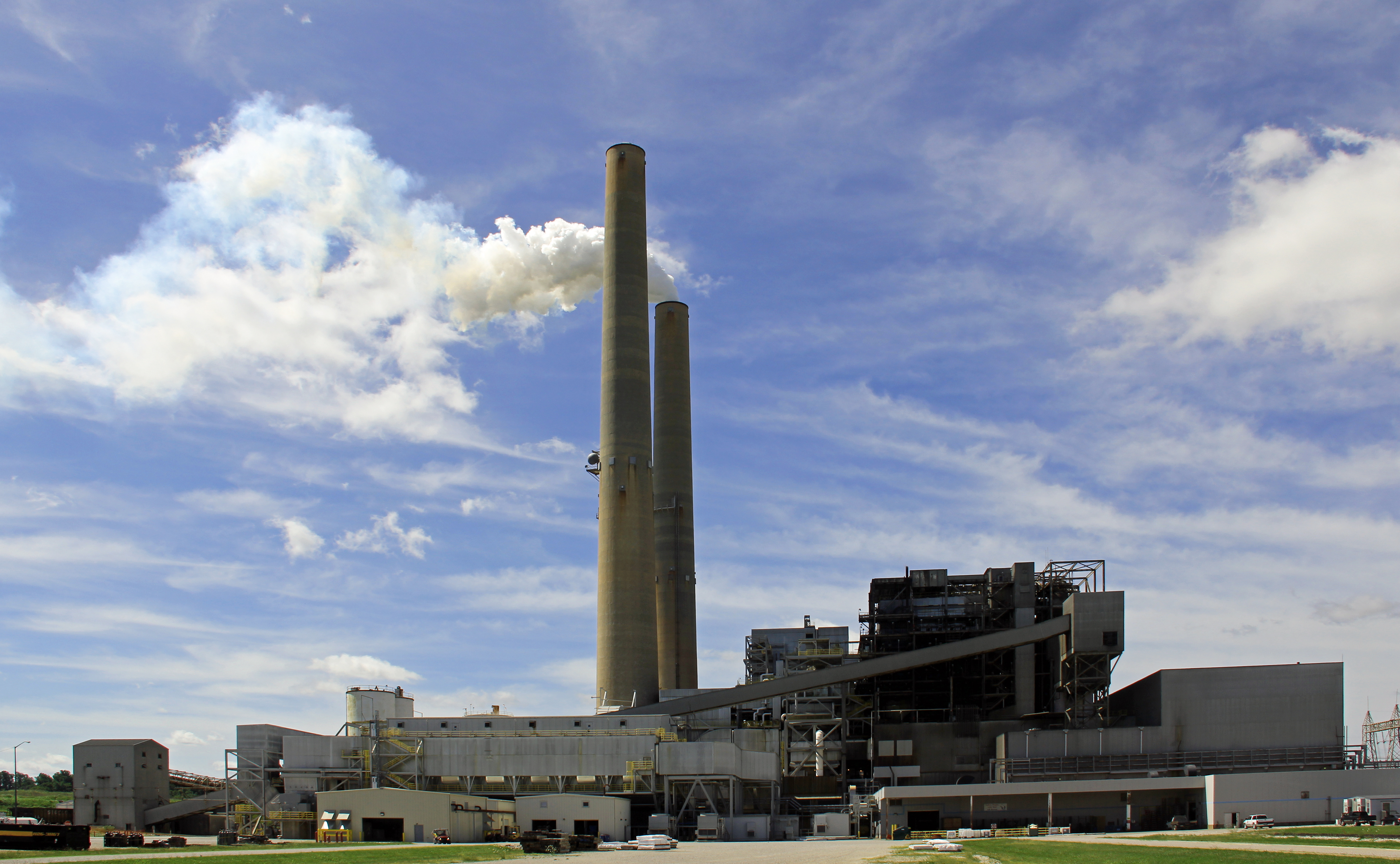
- A.B. Brown Generating Station in 2011
- Country: United States
- Location: Marrs Township, Posey County, near Mount Vernon, Indiana
- Coordinates: 37°54′20″N 87°42′54″W
- Status: Operational
- Commission date: Unit 1 (coal): March, 1979; Unit 2 (coal): February, 1986; Unit 4 (gas): June, 1991; Unit 5 (gas): May, 2002; Unit 6 (gas): August, 2025; Unit 7 (gas): September, 2025
- Decommission date: Unit 1 (coal): October, 2023; Unit 2 (coal): October, 2025
- Owner: Centerpoint Energy

Thermal power station
- Primary fuel: Bituminous coal
- Secondary fuel: Natural gas
- Turbine technology: Steam; Combustion gas turbine

Power generation
- Nameplate capacity: 700 MW

The A. B. Brown Generating Station is a four-unit, 700 megawatt (MW) power plant, located on the northern bank of Ohio River, 8 miles (10 km) east of Mount Vernon, Indiana and 5 miles (8 km) southwest of Evansville, Indiana just west of the Posey-Vanderburgh County Line. Each of the two coal-fired units (units 1 and 2) has a name-plate capacity of 265.2 MW. Bituminous coal is used as the primary fuel type, which can be substituted for natural gas. There are also two gas turbine units, 88.2 MW of nameplate capacity each. The facility is owned by Centerpoint Energy (formerly Vectren, preceded by Southern Indiana Gas and Electric Company). Vectren announced a plan to retire the coal fired units in 2023 and replace them with natural gas units. Units 1 and 2 were both decommissioned in October 2023 and natural gas units 6 and 7 went online in 2025.

== Environmental impact ==
The A. B. Brown Station ash management impoundment was formed by building a dam to block off the outlet of a natural ravine about 0.5 miles (0.8 km) from the Ohio river. The ash pond consists of two dams. The Lower dam (built in 1978) has been classified by the Indiana DNR as a Significant Hazard (State ID#65-7, permit #D-4405, rev 1). The Upper dam (constructed in two phases in 2002 and 2007) was not classified, but has a permit #FW-21909. Liquid wastes being sluiced into the pond include fly ash, bottom ash, boiler slag, FGD belt filter wash down and water sump wastes, pyrites, material removed from the coal pile run-off pond, plant floor drain wash downs, boiler chemical leaning wastes, reverse osmosis system rejects, and rainfall/runoff from the surrounding area. According to Vectren, no discernible amount of material has been removed from the pond since it first began operation in 1978.

== See also ==
- List of power stations in Indiana
