= Kōwhai Park Solar Farm =

Photovoltaic power station in New Zealand

- Country: New Zealand
- Location: Christchurch Airport
- Coordinates: 43°29′45″S 172°30′38″E
- Status: Operating
- Construction began: August 2024
- Commission date: 15 October 2026
- Construction cost: NZ$300 million
- Owners: Contact Energy; Lightsource BP
- Operators: Contact Energy; Lightsource BP

Solar farm
- Type: Flat-panel PV
- Site area: 300 ha

Power generation
- Nameplate capacity: 150 MW (168 MWp)
- Annual net output: 290 GWh

The Kōwhai Park Solar Farm is a photovoltaic power station at Christchurch Airport in Canterbury, New Zealand. The farm is owned by a joint venture between Contact Energy and Lightsource BP. The farm covers 300 hectares and generates 150 MW of electricity.

The solar farm takes its name from a century-old Kowhai that is located in the middle of the farm.

== Development ==
The project was first announced in December 2021. In February 2023, Christchurch Airport announced Contact Energy and Lightsource as its partners to develop and operate the solar farm. Finance was agreed in August 2024, and construction began the same month. The first row of panels was installed in August 2025.

The solar farm was expected to be operational by mid 2026, however, it officially opened in October 2026.

== Users ==
Synlait will purchase 25% of the electricity generated to power its Dunsandel and Dairyworks sites.

== See also ==
- Solar power in New Zealand
