= Schahfer Generating Station =

Coal-fired power plant in the United States

R M Schahfer Power Plant
- Country: United States
- Coordinates: 41°12′59″N 87°01′34″W
- Owner: NiSource

Power generation
- Nameplate capacity: 1,105 MW; 2,201.4 MW

Schahfer Generating Station is a coal-fired power plant in Wheatfield, Indiana. On December 23, 2025, the Department of Energy ordered a number of coal-fired units in Indiana to continue burning coal for another 90 days, pushing shutdown dates that were scheduled for December 31. This included one unit at F. B. Culley Generating Station and two at Schahfer. An emergency order was issued, citing grid reliability concerns due to immense power demands of data centers and other industrial uses. The units in Indiana prevented from shutting down totals to over 950 MW. This action is controversial, partly because of cheaper, cleaner methods of power generation being available. The Emergency order also followed a day after the Trump Administration froze construction on multiple offshore wind farms that would have totaled approximately 7 GW of power output.

The plant stopped operating in February 2026 for maintenance that will last until the fall. The utility stated that it had adequate resources to supply the grid without the Schahfer plant. Despite the DOE's order, there is not actually a grid reliability emergency, and preventing the retirement of uneconomical and unnecessary coal-fired plants will cost ratepayers millions of dollars.

== See also ==
- List of power stations in Indiana
