= Perry K. Generating Station =

Thermal power station in Indianapolis, Indiana, US

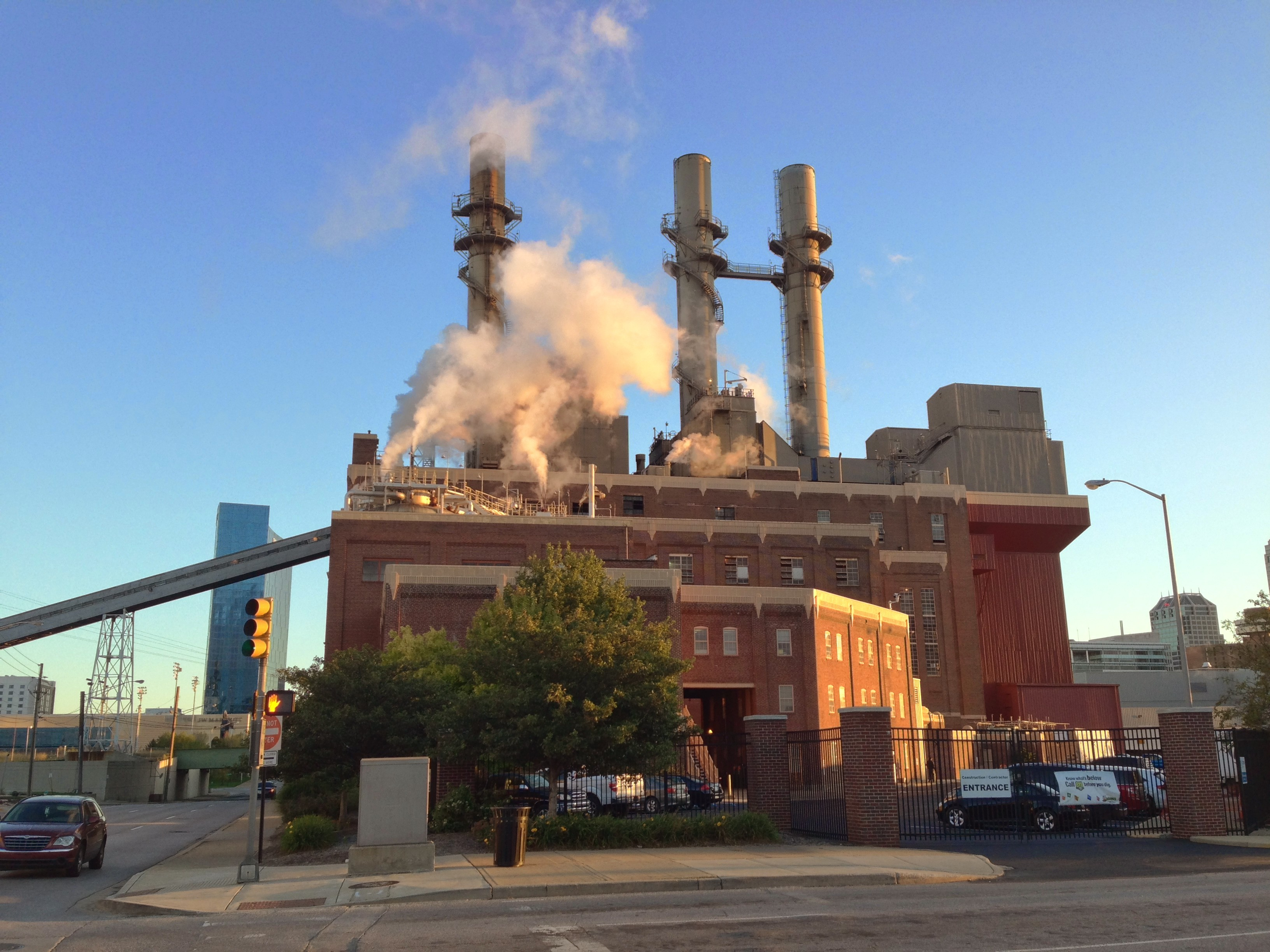
- Perry K. Generating Station in 2014
- Country: United States
- Location: Downtown Indianapolis, Indiana, U.S.
- Coordinates: 39°45′46″N 86°10′01″W
- Status: Operational
- Commission date: Unit 4: January 1925; Unit 6: July 1938
- Owner: Citizens Energy Group

Thermal power station
- Primary fuel: Natural Gas
- Turbine technology: Steam turbine

Power generation
- Nameplate capacity: 20 MWe

External links
- Commons: Related media on Commons

Perry K. Generating Station is a small multi-fired power station producing steam for one of the largest central district steam heating systems in the United States. The plant is located on the south side of Downtown Indianapolis, at the intersection of Kentucky Avenue and West Street. Its coal-fired units were among the oldest operating power plants in the United States at the time, and were converted to natural gas in 2016. Perry K. is owned by Citizens Thermal, a division of Citizens Energy Group.

== History ==
=== 19th century ===
In 1892–1893, the Indianapolis Light and Power Company, a predecessor of the Indianapolis Power and Light Company (IPL), constructed a generating plant on Kentucky Avenue near the intersection with West Street. The $300,000 plant, originally known as the "Kentucky Avenue Plant", had a capacity of 1,120 kilowatts. Its output was initially used for street and commercial lighting, but in 1905 the plant was modified to provide steam for the district heating of a number of downtown businesses.

=== 20th century ===
In 1937, a plant expansion included the installation of 650 psig boilers and the use of pulverized coal. That same year the Kentucky Avenue plant and the nearby West plant at 744 West Washington Avenue were renamed as Sections K and W, respectively, of the Charles C. Perry Plant.

=== 21st century ===
In 2000, IPL sold the district heating system and the Perry K plant to Citizens Gas and Coke Utility (later renamed as Citizens Energy Group).

== See also ==
- List of power stations in Indiana
