= Warrick Power Plant =

Warrick Generating Station
- Country: United States
- Location: Anderson Township, Warrick County, near Newburgh, Indiana
- Coordinates: 37°54′53″N 87°20′01″W
- Status: Operational
- Commission date: Unit 1: April, 1960; Unit 2: January 1964; Unit 3: October 1965; Unit 4: October 1970
- Owners: AGC Division of APG Inc., Alcoa

Thermal power station
- Primary fuel: Bituminous coal
- Cooling source: Ohio River

Power generation
- Nameplate capacity: 755 MW

Warrick Generating Station is a coal-fired electricity-generating station, located southeast of Newburgh in Warrick County in Indiana, US.

It sits on the north bank of Ohio River, downstream of the F. B. Culley Generating Station. The plant has four coal-fired, steam-powered turbines with a combined generating capacity of 791 MWe. Alcoa owns three of the four generating stations, which were placed into service in the early 1960s. The largest unit, known as Unit 4, is 323-MWe unit jointly owned by Alcoa and Vectren. This larger unit was placed in operation in 1970.

== Environmental impact ==
Warrick Plant discharges all of its waste heat (about twice its electrical output) into Ohio River. In 2006, Warrick Plant was the third most-polluting major power station in the US in terms of sulphur dioxide gas emission rate: it discharged 32.69 pounds (14.83 kg) of SO_{2} for each MWh of electric power produced that year (92,919 tons of SO_{2} per year in total).

== See also ==
- List of power stations in Indiana
- Climate change in the United States
