= Petersburg Generating Station =

- Country: United States
- Location: Washington Township, Pike County, near Petersburg, Indiana
- Coordinates: 38°31′39″N 87°15′14″W
- Status: Operational
- Commission date: Unit 1: 1967; Unit 2: 1969; Unit 3: 1977; Unit 4: 1986
- Owner: AES Indiana

Thermal power station
- Primary fuel: Bituminous coal
- Turbine technology: Steam turbine
- Cooling source: White River

Power generation
- Nameplate capacity: 2,146 MWe

Petersburg Generating Station is a major coal-fired power plant in Indiana, rated at 2.146-GW nameplate capacity. It is located on the White River near Petersburg in Pike County, Indiana, just 1 mile (1.6 km) upstream from a much smaller coal-fired Frank E. Ratts Generating Station. Petersburg G.S. is owned and operated by AES Indiana (formerly known as Indianapolis Power & Light).

Units 1, 2, and 3, rated at 281.6, 523.3, and 670.9 MWe, were launched into operation in 1967, 1969, and 1977 respectively. Unit 4, rated at 670.9 MWe, was launched in 1986. There are also three minor oil-burning internal combustion units, rated at 2.7 MWe each, all launched in 1967.

The coal is supplied from Bear Run Coal Mine and Gibson Coal Mine. The station plans to switch to natural gas by 2026. A 200 MW / 800 MWh grid battery started operating in 2025.

== See also ==
- List of largest power stations in the United States
- List of power stations in Indiana
- Global warming
