= Alford, Indiana =

Unincorporated community in Indiana, United States

- Census designated place
- Location within Indiana Location within the United States
- Coordinates: 38°29′30″N 87°14′40″W
- Country: United States
- State: Indiana
- County: Pike
- Township: Washington
- Elevation: 518 ft (158 m)
- Time zone: UTC-5 (Eastern (EST))
  - Summer (DST): UTC-4 (EDT)
- ZIP code: 47567
- Area code: 812
- GNIS feature ID: 2830492

Alford is an unincorporated community and census designated place (CDP) in Washington Township, Pike County, in the U.S. state of Indiana.

== History ==
Alford was laid out by Elijah, Nathaniel and Samuel Alford on Nov. 8, 1856. A grade was made for the Straight Line Railroad, but the track was never laid. The school, a two-room building, closed in the 1960s (children were then bused to Petersburg). A general store also closed in the 1960s. There is one church, the United Methodist Church.

== Demographics ==
The United States Census Bureau delineated Alford as a census designated place in the 2022 American Community Survey.
