= Edwardsport Power Station =

Coal-fired power station in the United States

- Country: United States
- Location: Vigo Township, Knox County, near Edwardsport, Indiana
- Coordinates: 38°47′56″N 87°15′0″W
- Status: Operational
- Construction began: 1918
- Commission date: (old site); Unit 1: 1918; Unit 2: 1944; Unit 3: 1949; Unit 4: 1951 (new site); Unit 1: June, 2013
- Decommission date: (old site); Unit 1: n.a. Unit 2: 2010; Unit 3: 2010; Unit 4: 2010
- Construction cost: US$3.4 billion
- Owner: Duke Energy
- Operator: Duke Energy
- Employees: 120

Thermal power station
- Primary fuel: Bituminous coal
- Secondary fuel: Coal-derived Syngas
- Tertiary fuel: Natural gas
- Turbine technology: Integrated gasification combined cycle
- Cooling source: White River
- Combined cycle?: Yes

Power generation
- Units operational: 1
- Units decommissioned: 4
- Nameplate capacity: 618 MW
- Capacity factor: 73%
- Annual net output: 4000 GW·h

Edwardsport Power Station is a 618 MW Integrated gasification combined cycle (IGCC) coal based power plant in Vigo Township, Knox County, near the town of Edwardsport, Indiana. The integrated gasification combined cycle power plant (Edwardsport IGCC) construction started in June 2008 by Duke Energy near the site of an older 160 MW coal-fired electrical power plant, which was decommissioned in 2010.

Edwardsport IGCC began commercial operations in June 2013.

== Older units ==
First development was in 1918, followed by Units 2, 3 and 4, rated at 42.5, 42.5 and 75 MW respectively, were placed into service in 1944, 1949 and 1951. The smaller, older units were retired when the new 618-MW plant came online. The old Edwardsport plant was officially taken offline in late 2011, and deconstruction began in mid-2010. The old Edwardsport plant was demolished in late October 2012.

== IGCC units ==
In 2007, Duke Energy Indiana began construction of a 618 megawatt (MW) integrated gasification combined cycle power plant (IGCC). This plant was to be the first of its kind of its size. The gasification process makes coal react with pure oxygen and steam to produce synthetic gas, or syngas. Syngas burns cleaner than burning directly the coal and stripping the pollutants out of the exhaust gas. And syngas may be used to fire a combustion turbine. The combustion turbine exhaust gases are then routed through a large heat recovery steam generator that is used in conjunction with a steam turbine to further increase the plant's efficiency. The new plant is slated to be a base-load station. The construction of the plant has reserved the necessary space required for carbon capture and storage if Duke Energy decides to add this component to the plant at a later date. However, when the plant was originally planned, it was thought the site was ready for carbon injection. After conducting further research, it was determined that the site is actually not geologically suitable for underground storage of carbon. Instead, Duke Energy Indiana would need to seek approval to construct a pipeline to transport carbon to a more suitable site.

Edwardsport's pollution per unit of energy produced will be greatly reduced, as particulate matter and mercury will be removed from the syngas. The coal-derived synthetic gas is much cleaner than conventional coal combustion to begin with, and it is easier to clean to greater extent. Coal gasification allows carbon capture to occur before the fuel is combusted — a much easier and economically feasible operation than carbon capture of exhaust gases.

== Technology ==
The power plant has two trains of General Electric radiant quench gasification equipment. Each train fuels a General Electric 7FB 236 MW combustion turbine. Following each GE turbine is a Doosan two pressure Heat recovery steam generator (HRSG). Both HRSG recovered steam powers a single General Electric G13 326 MW four flow, reheat steam turbine. The plant is so defined as a 2 x 1 Combined Cycle. Gross power is 800 MW, but the syngas process consumes much energy, leaving only 618 MW net power to the grid. To save water, cooling is helped by a 20 cell mechanical draft cooling tower.

== Cost overruns and controversy ==
The construction of the Edwardsport IGCC has been clouded in controversy and legal troubles for both Duke Energy Indiana and the Indiana Utility Regulatory Commission. Thus far, the legal issues have resulted in the resignation of the second highest ranked executive for Duke Energy, the dismissal of the Chairman of the IURC, David Lott Hardy, and Hardy's subsequent indictment for three felony counts of official misconduct in cases concerning Duke Energy, although the charges were dismissed on 12 August 2013.

== Production ==
Generation (MW·h) of Edwardsport Power Station
Year	Jan	Feb	Mar	Apr	May	Jun	Jul	Aug	Sep	Oct	Nov	Dec	Total
2013						54,406	119,268	272,509	138,340	195,973	124,650	147,071	1,052,217
2014	81,316	21,697	148,195	164,869	302,967	256,362	308,374	283,701	66,419	122,085	315,521	107,302	2,178,808
2015	305,460	287,843	350,543	85,979	116,476	307,236	368,309	278,768	361,116	242,372	61,803	341,566	3,107,471
2016	342,873	376,695	351,127	230,299	152,651	361,110	347,328	385,398	276,943	-6,819	19,815	255,127	3,092,547
2017	310,090	365,765	402,040	297,422	247,705	372,725	359,305	366,476	268,135	228,520	393,360	357,749	3,969,292
2018	363,080	340,008	395,881	197,941	266,860	323,412	399,371	397,584	269,421	272,865	330,772	404,823	3,962,018
Total (2013–2018)													17,362,353

== See also ==
- List of power stations in Indiana
