= Merom Generating Station =

Power station in Indiana, United States

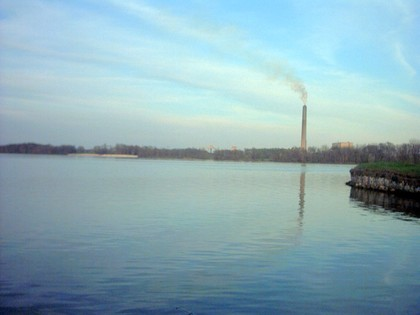
- Merom Generating Station from the Wabash River
- Country: United States
- Location: Gill Township, Sullivan County, near Merom, Indiana
- Coordinates: 39°04′04″N 87°30′41″W
- Status: Operational
- Commission date: Unit 1: September, 1983; Unit 2: February, 1982
- Owner: Hallador Energy Company

Thermal power station
- Primary fuel: Bituminous coal, distillate fuel oil
- Turbine technology: Steam turbine
- Cooling source: Artificial lake

Power generation
- Nameplate capacity: 1,080 MWe

Merom Generating Station is a 2-unit, 1080 MW rated coal-fired power plant located between Merom, Indiana, and Sullivan, Indiana, which has been in operation since 1982. It is owned by Hallador Energy Company, who acquired it from Hoosier Energy effective October 21, 2022.

On January 21, 2020, Hoosier Energy announced that the company expected to retire the facility in 2023. On February 15, 2022, Hoosier Energy and Hallador announced that Hallador would acquire the generating station. On October 21, 2022, the companies announced that the acquisition was finalized.

== Turtle Creek Reservoir ==
The 1,600-acre Turtle Creek Reservoir is located adjacent to the generating station and serves as its cooling source. It is owned by Hoosier Energy, and is open to the public for seasonal fishing and waterfowl hunting.

== Environmental impact ==
=== Air pollution ===
- 2006 CO_{2} Emissions: 7,064,920 tons
- 2006 SO_{2} Emissions: 14,847 tons
- 2006 NOx Emissions: 7,808 tons
- 2005 Mercury Emissions: 162 pounds (73 kg)

== Legal settlement ==
In July 2010 a settlement agreement was reached between the U.S. Environmental Protection Agency and Hoosier Energy to reduce emissions that are regulated under the Clean Air Act. The settlement included a civil penalty and a commitment to upgrade the air pollution controls at two power plants in Indiana, Merom Generating Station and Frank E. Ratts Generating Station.

== See also ==
- List of power stations in Indiana
- Global warming
