= Harding Street Station =

Generating station in Indianapolis, Indiana, US

- Country: United States
- Location: Indianapolis, Indiana
- Coordinates: 39°42′34″N 86°11′48″W
- Status: Operational
- Commission date: Units 1 and 2 (oil): Nov 1931; Unit 3 (oil): Sept 1941; Unit 4 (oil): June 1947; Unit 5 (coal/gas): June 1958/Dec 2015; Unit 6 (coal/gas): May 1961/Dec 2015; Unit 7 (coal/gas): July 1973/2016; Unit IC1 (oil): 1967; Units GT1–GT3 (oil): May 1973; Unit GT4 (gas): 1994; Unit GT5 (gas): 1995; Unit GT6 (gas): 2002
- Owner: AES Indiana

Thermal power station
- Primary fuel: Natural gas, distillate fuel oil
- Turbine technology: Steam, gas turbine
- Cooling source: White River

Power generation
- Units operational: 6
- Nameplate capacity: 1,196 MWe

The Harding Street Station (formerly Elmer W. Stout Generating Station) is a 12-unit, 1,196 MW nameplate capacity, gas, coal, and oil-fired generating station located at 3700 S. Harding St., in Indianapolis, Indiana, U.S. It is owned by AES Indiana (formerly known as Indianapolis Power & Light), a subsidiary of AES. Completed in 1973, Harding Street Station's tallest chimneys are 565 feet (172 m) in height.

== History ==
The first phase of the Harding Street Generating Station was originally constructed by the Indianapolis Power & Light Company between August 1929 and November 1931. With two generating units, it supplied the city with 75,000 kilowatts, distributed through a series of substations around the city. The plant was in service for only a few months before a fire ripped through the building from an oil fire. A fourth unit was added in 1947.

The Harding Street Station was renamed the Elmer W. Stout Generating Station on September 10, 1958, when a fifth power generating unit was completed. Stout had served on the Indiana Power and Light Company board since 1930 and had been chairman of the executive committee since 1940.

In 2022, on behalf of the Hoosier Environmental Council, SOCM, the Sierra Club, Environmental Integrity Project, Clean Power Lake County, the Indiana State Conference and the LaPorte County Branch of the NAACP, Earthjustice filed a lawsuit to force the United States Environmental Protection Agency to address the plant's coal ash ponds. The complaint argued that monitors had detected heavy metals such as arsenic, cadmium, and lithium leaking into the surrounding groundwater.

In an SEC filing in 2016, IPL reported that it had completed its retrofit of Units 5 and 6 by December 2015 and of Unit 7 in the second quarter of 2016. This conversion "from coal to natural gas (approximately 610 total MW net capacity) at a total cost of approximately $105 million."

== Environmental impact ==
=== Sulphur dioxide ===
With its oldest coal-fired unit dating back to 1958, the plant was ranked 12th on the United States list of dirtiest power plants in terms of sulphur dioxide emissions per megawatt-hour of electrical energy produced from coal in 2005.

The new flue gas desulphurization system (FGS), also known as a scrubber, and the new stack are expected to reduce sulfur dioxide (SO_{2}) emissions by 97 percent, and NOx emissions, as well as other pollutants, by some 87 percent.

IPL stopped burning coal at the Harding Street facility in 2016 and retrofitted the units to natural gas.

=== Coal ash ponds ===
On the south side of the former plant is a sequence of unlined coal ash ponds. As of 2019, there were 27 groundwater monitoring wells. Between 2016 and 2019, 24 of these were polluted above federal advisory levels of molybdenum, boron, lithium, sulfate, arsenic, antimony, selenium, and cobalt.

== See also ==
- List of power stations in Indiana
- List of tallest buildings in Indianapolis § Other structures
- List of tallest chimneys
