= Mammoth Solar =

Solar power plant in Indiana, United States

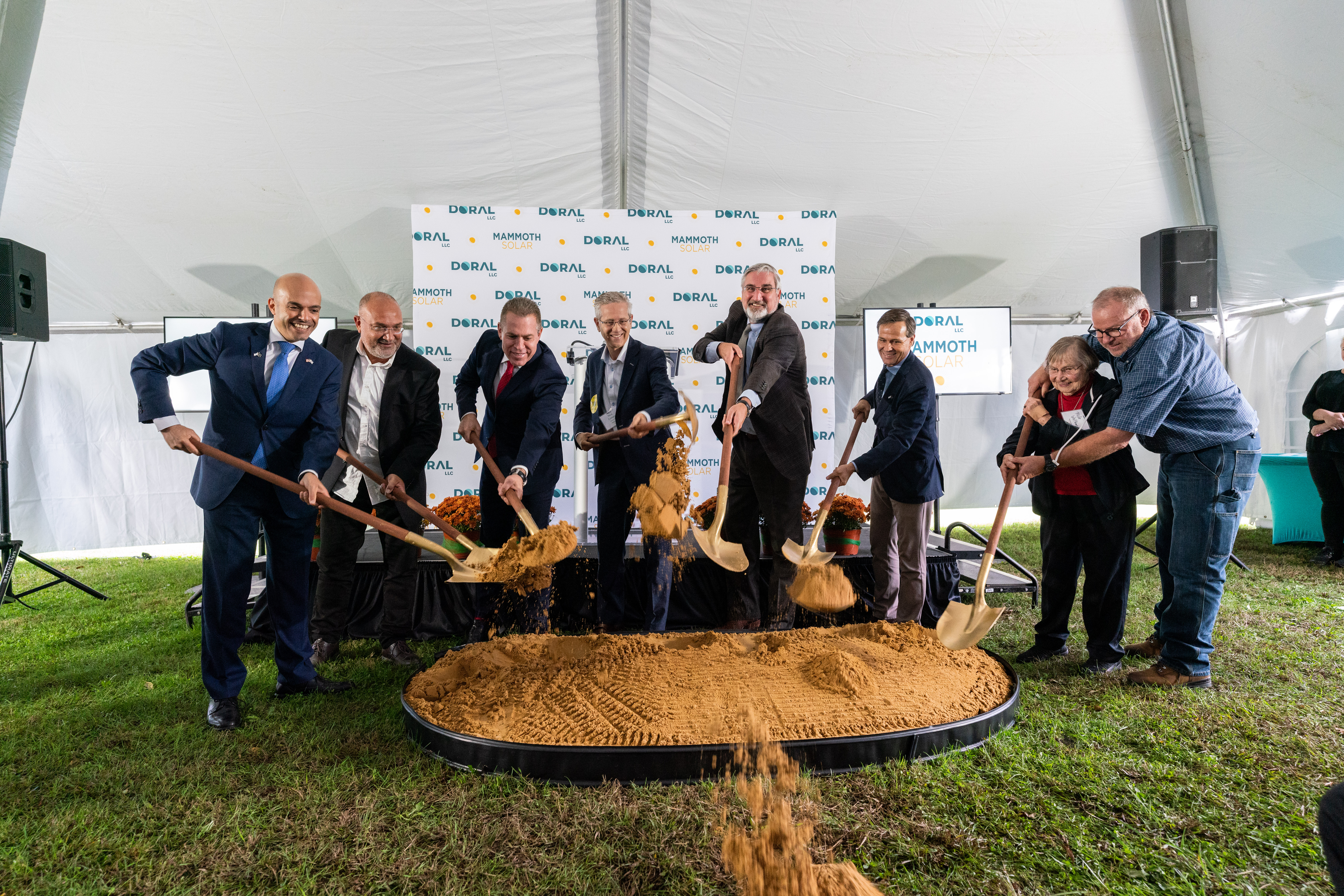
- Groundbreaking ceremony for Mammoth North Solar
- Country: United States
- Location: Indiana
- Coordinates: 40°59′45″N 86°49′19″W
- Construction began: October 2021
- Commission date: July 2024 (phase 1)
- Owner: Doral Energy

Solar farm
- Type: Flat-panel PV
- Site area: 13,000 acres (5,300 ha)

Power generation
- Nameplate capacity: 1,600 MW_{DC} 1,300 MW_{AC}

External links
- Website: doral-energy.com/en/projects/mammoth-solar/

Mammoth Solar is a 1,600–megawatt (MW_{DC}) solar photovoltaic power project in Pulaski and Starke Counties, Indiana, United States. The plant was constructed in three phases and is the largest photovoltaic power station in the United States and western hemisphere. The first section of 480 MW came online in July 2024, and the final sections in October 2026. The project was developed by Doral Renewables, a subsidiary of Israeli company Doral Energy, and was expected to cost US$1.5 billion. It produces enough electricity to power 250,000 homes.

== Project ==
Doral Energy has contracts with about 60 landowners to use approximately 13,000 acres (53 km^{2}) of land for the project, though excluding setbacks, forests, and wetlands, the 2.85 million solar panels will cover only about 2,500 acres (10 km^{2}). Most of the farmland is used for corn ethanol production; powering gasoline cars with bioethanol consumes around 70 times more land than powering electric vehicles with solar power. Doral is working with landowners to support dual uses of the project land as agrivoltaics to allow for grazing of 2,000 sheep, alpacas and donkeys and farming of various crops around the solar panels, including research on plant growth under panels. Operations will be managed by NovaSource.

The phases will use three points of interconnection on a 345 kV power line to deliver power into the PJM Interconnection. American Electric Power has power purchase agreements for electricity produced in phases one and two and half of phase three. Constellation Energy has a power purchase agreements on the other half of the power in phase three, passed on to four corporations.

Pulaski and Starke Counties will each see US$1 to 2 million per year in additional property tax revenue for the life of the project, about a fifth of their budgets. The project is also making economic development payments to Pulaski County totaling $375,200 in 2024. Pulaski County also designated the project an Economic Revitalization Area, granting it a tax abatement; the Indiana Court of Appeals rejected a lawsuit challenging the designation. Local landowners are paid about US$600–1,000 per acre leased.

The project's name references mastodon fossils that were unearthed in the region of the solar project, now on display at the National Museum of Natural History.

NIMBY groups have organized against the project and filed suit against Pulaski County's zoning approval.

Doral is considering additional phases of the project, with up to 900 MW called Mammoth Grazing Lands and Pastures.

== Phases and construction ==
SOLV Energy is the project's EPC contractor.

The Mammoth North phase in Starke County had a groundbreaking ceremony in October 2021. Construction began in March 2022 and it was completed in July 2024 with a capacity of 480 MW_{DC}/400 MW_{AC}. The project uses 540-watt modules from Trina Solar.

The second phase, Mammoth South in Pulaski County, had a groundbreaking ceremony in November 2022. Construction began in 2025, and it was completed in October 2026. It has a capacity of 300 MW_{AC}.

Indiana governor Eric Holcomb attended groundbreaking ceremonies for both phases. Holcomb later joined Doral's board of directors.

The 600 MW_{AC} third phase, Mammoth Central in Pulaski County, was divided into two subphases; construction on both began in 2025. They were completed in October 2026.

== See also ==
- List of photovoltaic power stations
- List of power stations in Indiana
- Solar power in Indiana
- Solar power in the United States
- Renewable energy in the United States
