= Tanners Creek =

Stream in Indiana, U.S.

Coordinates: 39.0749°N 84.8699°W

Tanners Creek is a stream in the U.S. state of Indiana. It is a 17-mile (27 km) long tributary to the Ohio River.

Tanners Creek was named after John Tanner Jr., a pioneer settler who was captured by Indians.

The Tanner's Creek Generating Station operated on the banks of Tanners Creek until it closed in 2015.
