= Cayuga Generating Station =

Electricity-generating facility in Indiana, US

Coordinates: 39°55′26″N 87°25′38″W

Cayuga Generating Station is an electricity-generating facility, located in Eugene Township, Vermillion County, near Cayuga, Indiana. Its almost identical, coal-fired Units 1 and 2 were launched into service in 1970 and 1972, and have a combined name-plate generating capacity of 1,062 MWe. Unit 4 (121 MWe, launched in 1993) is powered by natural gas, but can also be switched to oil. There are also four minor oil-fired units (numbered 31–34, 2.6 MWe each) of internal combustion design. The facility is entirely owned by Duke Energy.

== Environmental impact ==
In 2006, the plant emitted 86,174 tons of sulfur dioxide (SO_{2}) into the air. Its SO_{2} emission rate per unit of electricity produced was 26.68 lb/MWh in 2006, ranking 2nd worst in the United States. In 2008, Cayuga Station's flue-gas desulfurization (FGD) for Units 1 and 2 went online reducing the station's SO_{2} emissions by approximately 95%.

== See also ==
- List of power stations in Indiana
