= Tanner's Creek Generating Station =

Electrical power plant in Indiana, US

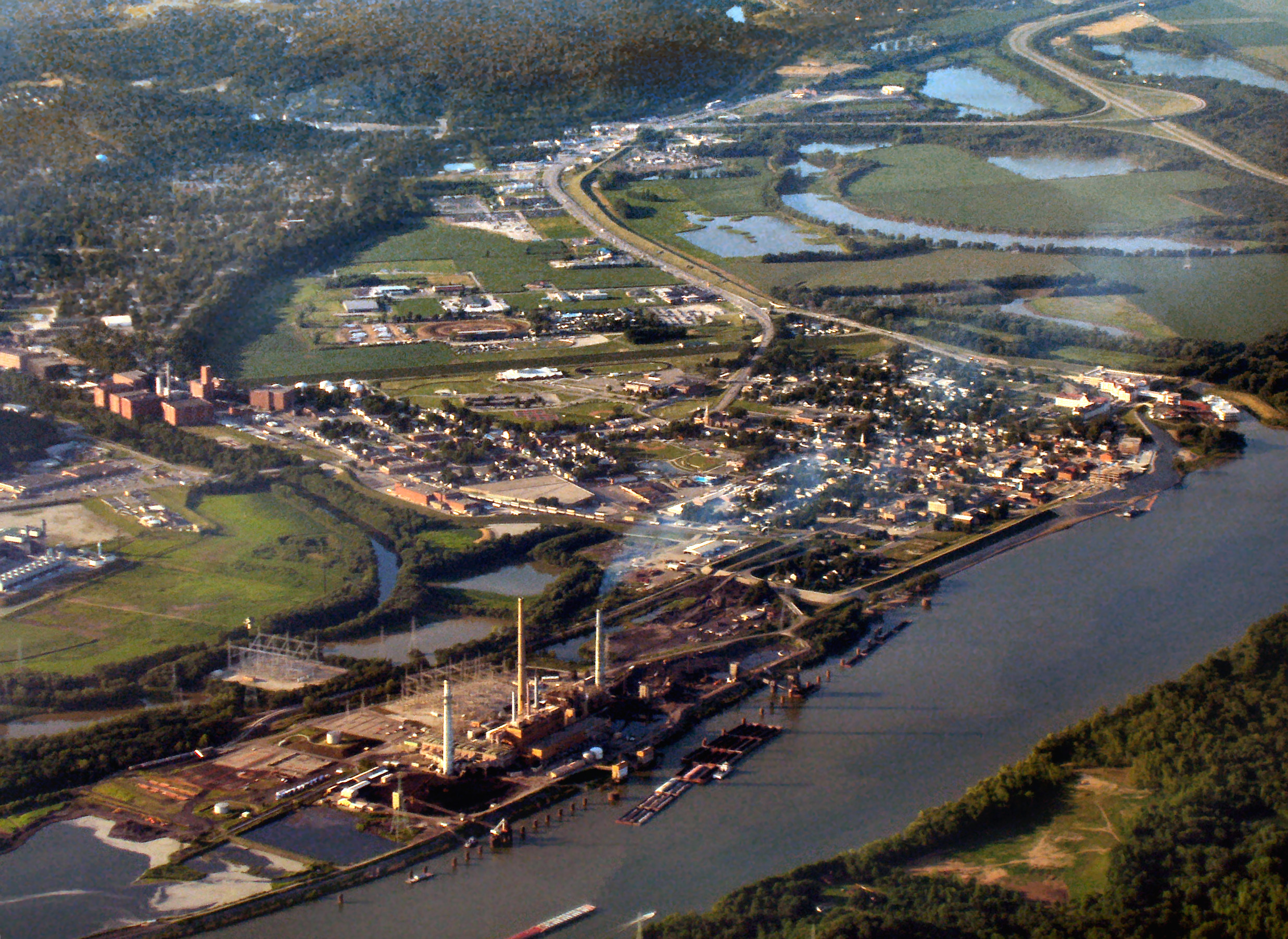
- Lawrenceburg from the air, looking northeast. Tanner's Creek Generating Station is at bottom left.
- Country: United States
- Location: Lawrenceburg, Indiana
- Coordinates: 39°04′53″N 84°51′39″W
- Status: Decommissioned
- Commission date: Unit 1: March, 1951; Unit 2: November, 1952; Unit 3: December, 1954; Unit 4: July, 1964
- Decommission date: May 31, 2015
- Owner: AES

Thermal power station
- Primary fuel: Bituminous coal
- Cooling source: Ohio River

Power generation
- Nameplate capacity: 995 MWe

Tanner's Creek Generating Station (also spelled Tanners Creek) was a major, 1000-MWe coal-fired electrical power plant in Indiana. Located on the north bank of Ohio River along Tanners Creek, it was one of the two coal-fired power stations within 3 miles (5 km) of Lawrenceburg, Indiana, near the tripoint of Indiana, Ohio, and Kentucky (the other plant being the Miami Fort Power Station in the neighboring Ohio). The former plant is situated directly across the Ohio river from Petersburg, Boone County, Kentucky. Tanner's Creek was one of the two Indiana coal power plants owned by Indiana Michigan Power, a subsidiary of American Electric Power (the other plant being Rockport Generating Station near Rockport, Indiana).

On March 17, 2015, Indiana Michigan Power announced that the Tanners Creek plant would be completely shut down by May 31, 2015. The former plant was sold to St. Louis–based Commercial Development Company in October 2016. The Port of Indiana commission is studying converting the former plant into the state's fourth port.

== Units ==
Units 1 and 2, rated at 145 MWe all-year capacity, were launched in 1951–1952.
Unit 3, rated at 200 MWe (summer) and 205 MWe (winter) capacity, was launched in the end of 1954.
The largest and newest Unit 4, rated at 500 MWe all-year capacity, was launched in mid-1964.

== Environmental impact ==
With three out of four of its units dating back to the 1950s, the plant was ranked 67th on the United States list of dirtiest power plants in terms of sulphur dioxide emissions per megawatt-hour of electrical energy produced in 2006.

== See also ==
- List of power stations in Indiana
