= R. Gallagher Generating Station =

Defunct power plant in New Albany, Indiana, U.S.

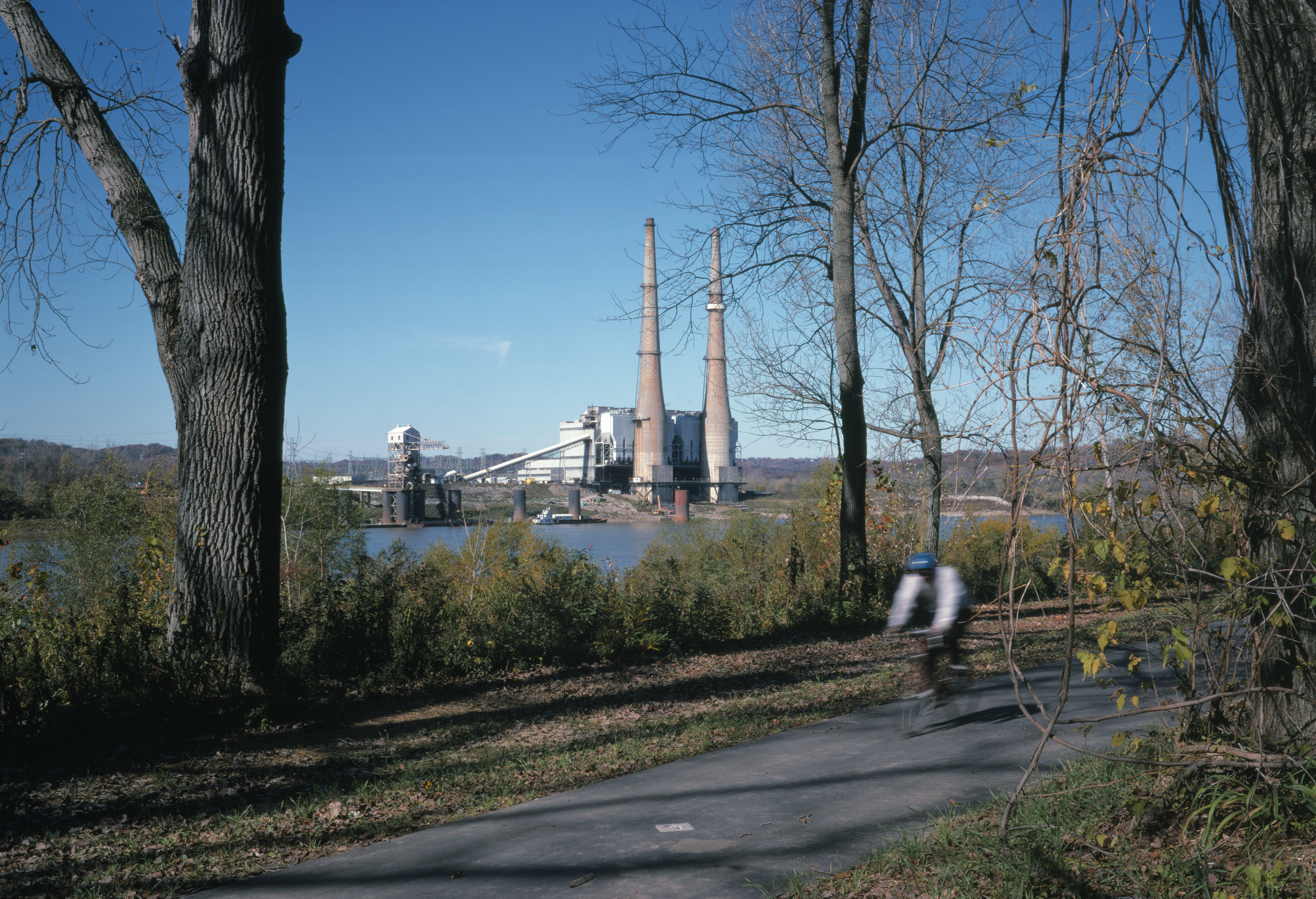
- R. Gallagher Generating Station (1996)
- Country: United States
- Location: New Albany, Indiana
- Coordinates: 38°15′49″N 85°50′16″W
- Status: Retired
- Commission date: Unit 1: June 1959; Unit 2: December 1958; Unit 3: April 1960; Unit 4: March 1961
- Decommission date: Unit 1: 2012; Unit 3: 2012; Unit 2: 2021; Unit 4: 2021
- Owner: Duke Energy

Thermal power station
- Primary fuel: Bituminous coal
- Turbine technology: Steam turbine
- Cooling source: Ohio River

Power generation
- Nameplate capacity: 280 MWe

The R. Gallagher Generating Station was a four-unit coal-burning power plant located along the Ohio River some two miles (3 km) downstream from New Albany, Indiana in southernmost Floyd County, Indiana. The total aggregate capacity (year-around) of the plant's four identical units was 560MW. Unit 2 began operating in 1958; unit 1 in 1959; unit 3 in 1960 and unit 4 in 1961. In early 2012, both Units 1 and 3 were retired. Units 2 and 4 continued to operate because Duke Energy installed baghouses, greatly reducing the pollution and meeting the current standards set by the EPA. The plant's 2012 output was 280 megawatts (each unit is rated at 140 megawatts). The plant is connected to the grid by 138 and 230 kilovolt transmission lines.

== Environmental impact ==
=== Sulphur dioxide emissions ===
As of 2006, R. Gallagher was the dirtiest major power station in the US in terms of sulphur dioxide gas emission rate: it discharged 40.38 pounds (18.32 kg) of SO_{2} for each MWh of electric power produced that year (50,819 tons of SO_{2} per year in total).

== Shutdown and plant closure ==
Duke Energy shutdown the plant on June 1, 2021, earlier than the previously scheduled retirement in 2022. After shutdown Duke Energy will continue the process of closing coal ash basins on site, which could take several years. The Gallagher plant is expected to be dismantled at some point in the future.

== Planned implosion and demolition ==
On October 20, 2024, the boiler house of the R. Gallagher Generating Station was imploded after being shut down since June 1, 2021, with the twin smoke stacks demolished by 2025.

== See also ==
- List of power stations in Indiana
- Global warming
