= Touchstone Energy =

American federation of energy cooperatives

Touchstone Energy Cooperatives
- Formation: 1998
- Type: Cooperative Federation
- Location: Arlington, Virginia, US
- Key people: Jim Bausell, Mary McLaury, Josh McGhee
- Website: touchstoneenergy.com

Touchstone Energy Cooperatives (also called simply Touchstone) is a cooperative federation composed of more than 750 local, consumer-owned utility cooperatives in 46 states in the United States. Touchstone Energy co-ops serve more than 30 million members.

Touchstone Energy was founded in 1998. Most of its members are also members of the National Rural Electric Cooperative Association. The federation includes both generation and transmission cooperatives and distribution cooperatives. More than 88% of Touchstone Energy's local electric co-ops generate at least a portion of their electricity from renewable resources.

== Philanthropy ==
Touchstone Energy's North Carolina cooperatives established the Bright Ideas grant program in 1993. The program provides educational grants of up to $3,000 for teachers in North Carolina who fund classroom-based projects out of their own pockets.

== Legal Settlement ==
In July 2010 an agreement was reached between the EPA and Hoosier Energy to reduce emissions that are regulated under the Clean Air Act. The agreement covers a civil penalty and a commitment to upgrade the air pollution controls at two power plants in Indiana, Merom Generating Station, and Frank E. Ratts Generating Station.

== See also ==
- National Rural Electric Cooperative Association (NRECA)
