= Milltown Biomass-to-Energy Power Station =

Milltown biomass-to-energy power station
- Country: United States
- Location: near Milltown, Indiana
- Coordinates: 38°21′32″N 86°17′02″W
- Status: Inactive (permit applications withdrawn)
- Commission date: never constructed
- Owner: Liberty Green Renewables

Thermal power station
- Primary fuel: Biomass
- Turbine technology: Fluidized-bed boiler/steam generation
- Cooling source: Blue River

Power generation
- Units operational: 0
- Nameplate capacity: 28 MWe

The Milltown Biomass-to-Energy Power Station was proposed as a 28 MWe biomass-to-electrical energy power station to be built near Milltown, Indiana in Crawford County. The project was proposed in December 2008 by Liberty Green Renewables (LGR), based in Georgetown, Indiana.

After significant opposition to its proposal by local community organizations, in 2011, LGR requested permanent revocation of two air permits and one acid rain permit it had been issued by the Indiana Department of Environmental Management. According to LGR representative, J.P. Rexroad, author of the request letter, dated September 26, 2011, "All of the sources permitted under the above-listed permits were never constructed or operated, and there are no longer any plans to do so.

The plant was originally to use woody biomass material from a number of local forest products and industrial sources, including residues from logging, land clearing activities, pallet manufacturing, furniture and cabinet manufacturing, sawmills, tree trimming and storm damage.

Later, LGR amended its permit to include additional sources such as scrap wood from demolition, but was prohibited from using any wood contaminated with lead from paint or other sources, or arsenic and the like from pressure-treating processes.

According to the company's original proposal, the facility would have used fluidized-bed boiler technology to enable incineration of a wide variety of woody biomass materials.

In LGR's first filing with the state, the company proposed discharging more than 170,000 gallons of water per day into the Blue River, but Terry Naulty of LGR told Fox 41 News the citizen response had prompted the company to propose, as an alternative, discharging the water onto its own property where it would grow energy crops and use it for irrigation water."

The area under discussion is karst geology, and it is unsure what impact the proposed discharge of large volumes of waste water would have had. The area underlying the proposed power plant is honeycombed with caves, fractures, and underground streams. Water dumped into "sink holes"—openings into the cave system—would typically migrate quickly though the rock via underground channels and fractures, possibly reaching the level of groundwater, or working its way into streams, wells, and rivers. The proposed site was adjacent to the Blue River, a state Wild and Scenic River area.

In addition to citing air pollution concerns, local residents contended that they depended on the ground water for their drinking water, and the river and caves were habitat for state and federally endangered species such as the Hellbender salamander and the Indiana Cave Bat.

== Sources ==
- Courier-Journal Newspaper article regarding permit application
- Blue River Project Nature Conservancy's page on the Blue River
- Karstwaters.org educational links Website with good information about karst topology
- Fox 41 interview with LGR
- Watershed Report Indiana State Watershed Restoration Action Report for the Blue-Sinking Watershed
- Liberty Green Renewables The developer of the plant.
- https://web.archive.org/web/20090508080324/http://www.nrel.gov/analysis/forum/pdfs/m_mann.pdf
