= Wade Utility Plant =

Power plant in West Lafayette, IN

Coordinates: 40.4172°N 86.9125°W

The Wade Utility Plant, more formally known as the Purdue University Walter W. Wade Utility Plant, is a combined power, water, and heating plant that provides multiple utilities to the West Lafayette campus of Purdue University. The plant was originally built in 1962, and has since been expanded and renovated to meet the needs of the growing university campus.

== History ==
The plant was constructed from 1959 to 1962 at a cost of $2,151,466, and was originally known as the South Heating and Power Plant. Located on the southern end of the Purdue West Lafayette campus, its purpose was to increase the power plant capacity of the university as demand increased with new construction. The plant underwent expansions in 1977, 1989, and 1997, and in 1991 the North Power Plant was taken out of commission. This left the Wade Power Plant as the primary power provider for the campus. In 1986 the plant was christened the Wade Utility Plant after Walter W. Wade, Purdue's first Vice President of Physical Facilities.

== Operation ==
Currently, the power plant operates three natural gas boilers and one coal boiler. These boilers have a combined capacity of 43.2 megawatts of power and provide steam-based heating to the campus' buildings. In 2020, construction began for a connected natural gas power plant that would supplement the steam heating from the Wade Utility Plant. This connected plant, operated by Duke Energy, received some backlash over climate concerns but was ultimately brought online in 2022.
