= F. B. Culley Generating Station =

American coal power plant in Indiana

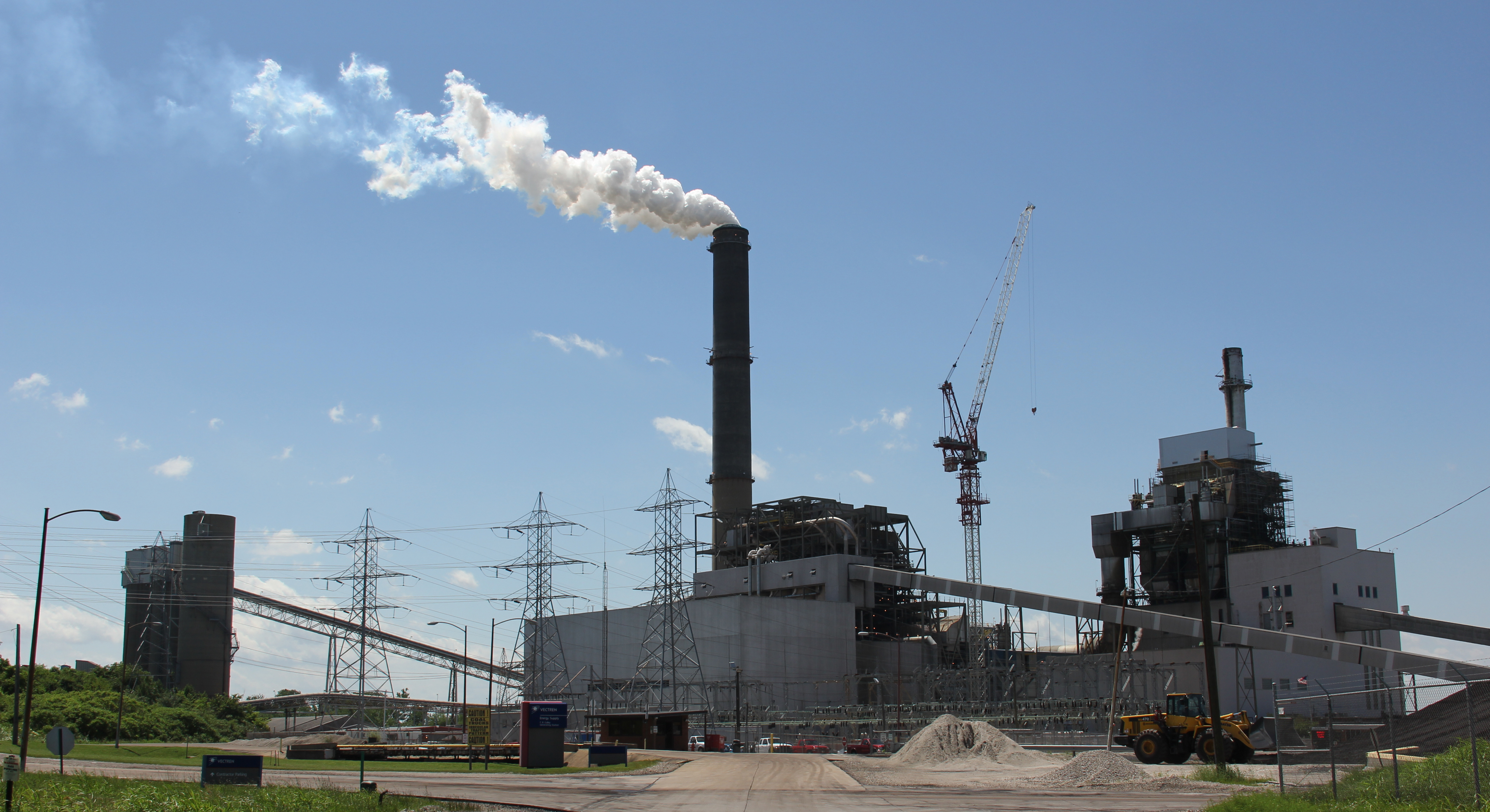
- The F. B. Culley Power Generating Station
- Country: United States
- Location: Anderson Township, Warrick County, Indiana, near Newburgh
- Coordinates: 37°54′33″N 87°19′30″W
- Status: Operational
- Commission date: Unit 1: 1955; Unit 2: December, 1966; Unit 3: June, 1973
- Decommission date: Unit 1: 2006; Unit 2: 2023 (planned)
- Owners: CenterPoint Energy (formerly Southern Indiana Gas & Electric Co.)

Thermal power station
- Primary fuel: Bituminous coal
- Turbine technology: Steam turbine
- Cooling source: Ohio River

Power generation
- Nameplate capacity: 369 MW

F. B. Culley Generating Station is a 369 megawatt (MW) coal power plant located southeast of Newburgh in Warrick County, Indiana. It sits on the north bank of Ohio River, immediately adjacent and upstream of the Warrick Power Plant, and is owned and operated by CenterPoint Energy.

== History ==
F. B. Culley has two units still in service: a 104 MW Unit 2 (built in 1966) and a larger 265 MW Unit 3 (built in 1973). Unit 1 with 46 MW, began electricity generation in 1955. The unit closed in 2006 in order to comply with the Environmental Protection Agency's (EPA) Clean Air Interstate Rule. It was announced in February 2018 that F. B. Culley's Unit 2 will be shut down in 2023. It was announced in April 2023 that F. B. Culley's Unit 3 will be converted to natural gas by 2027.

== Environmental impact ==
In 1992, Vectren installed a flue-gas desulfurization (FGD) system on Units 2 and 3 to reduce sulfur dioxide (SO_{2}) emissions and satisfy the requirement of the EPA's Acid Rain Program.

== See also ==
- List of power stations in Indiana
