= Miller Pipeline =

Miller Pipeline, headquartered in Indianapolis, Indiana, United States, is a natural gas distribution, water/wastewater, and transmission pipeline and utility contracting company. The company provides a pipeline contracting and rehabilitation services. In 2019, CenterPoint Energy merged with Vectren. In February 2020, CenterPoint announced it was selling Miller Pipeline and Minnesota Limited to Atlanta-based PowerTeam Services.

== History ==
Miller Pipeline was founded in 1953 (as a private company) as Don W. Miller, Incorporated in Green Springs, Ohio. In 1961, they branched out to Indianapolis and have since grown to include three divisions with approximately 3,800 construction professionals.

In 2011, Miller Pipeline acquired Minnesota Limited, which was founded in 1966. Minnesota Limited is headquartered in Big Lake, Minnesota.
