= Vectren =

Former American utility company

Vectren Corporation
- Company type: Subsidiary
- Industry: Utilities
- Founded: 2000
- Headquarters: Evansville, Indiana, United States
- Key people: Carl Chapman, CEO
- Revenue: ▲US$2.232 billion (FY 2012)
- Net income: ▲US$159 Million (FY 2012)
- Total assets: ▲US$5.09 billion (FY 2012)
- Number of employees: 5,400
- Parent: CenterPoint Energy
- Website: www.vectren.com

Vectren Corporation was a Fortune 1000 energy holding company headquartered in Evansville, Indiana. Through its utility subsidiaries (Vectren North, Vectren South, and Vectren Energy Delivery of Ohio), the company distributed natural gas to approximately one million business and residential customers in Indiana and Ohio. It also distributed electricity to 141,000 customers and had 1,425 MW of primarily coal-fired generating capacity in Indiana. Vectren's non-utility subsidiaries and affiliates offered energy-related products and services to customers throughout the Midwest and Southeast. These included energy performance services and energy infrastructure services.

== History ==
The company was formed from the merger of Indiana Gas Company (formed 1941) and Southern Indiana Gas and Electric Company (SIGECO, formed 1912). The two utilities' holding companies, Indiana Energy and SIGCORP, announced plans to merge in June 1999, and received final approval on March 9, 2000. In the fall of 2000, Vectren also acquired the natural gas distribution assets of Dayton Power and Light in western Ohio. In the fall of 2006, the company purchased Duke Energy's interest in Miller Pipeline.

It listed on the NYSE under ticker VVC in 2000.

Vectren's Riverfront Headquarters in Downtown Evansville.

Indiana Gas and SIGECO served as Vectren's operating companies until a 2010 reorganization saw Indiana Gas renamed Vectren North, while SIGECO was renamed Vectren South.

On April 23, 2018, CenterPoint Energy and Vectren Corporation announced they had entered into a definitive merger agreement, with CenterPoint being the emerging head company. On February 1, 2019, the merger was completed and Vectren was delisted from the NYSE. CenterPoint retained the Vectren name for Vectren's service territory until it was retired on May 3, 2021.

== Utilities ==
Vectren provides natural gas to 680,000 customers in Indiana (570,000 in central Indiana and 110,000 in southwestern Indiana) and 314,000 customers in Ohio. It provides electricity to 142,000 customers in southwestern Indiana.

== Non-utility subsidiaries and affiliates ==
Vectren's nonutility group consists of three divisions Infrastructure Services, Energy Services, and Coal Mining. Vectren also operates a nonprofit foundation, the Vectren Foundation, which provides assistance for community development and energy efficiency projects.

== Finance ==
On January 29, 2003, Vectren restated its 2001 earnings. As a result of adjustments related to gas and employee benefit costs, 2001 earnings previously reported were reduced by 18 cents per share. Vectren has installed the Healthcare Bluebook and Grand Rounds to reduce employee healthcare cost inflation.
