= Washington Township, Pike County, Indiana =

Washington Township Pike County
- Township
- Location in Pike County
- Coordinates: 38°28′36″N 87°15′23″W
- Country: United States
- State: Indiana
- County: Pike

Government
  - Type: Indiana township

Area
  - Total: 45.12 sq mi (116.9 km^{2})
  - Land: 44.09 sq mi (114.2 km^{2})
  - Water: 1.03 sq mi (2.7 km^{2}) 2.28%
- Elevation: 472 ft (144 m)

Population (2020)
  - Total: 4,314
  - Density: 97.85/sq mi (37.78/km^{2})
- ZIP codes: 47567, 47598
- GNIS feature ID: 454013

Washington Township is one of nine townships in Pike County, Indiana, United States. As of the 2020 census, its population was 4,314 and it contained 1,996 housing units.

Historical population
| Census | Pop. | Note | %± |
|---|---|---|---|
| 1890 | 3,557 | | — |
| 1900 | 4,153 | | 16.8% |
| 1910 | 4,628 | | 11.4% |
| 1920 | 4,966 | | 7.3% |
| 1930 | 4,835 | | −2.6% |
| 1940 | 5,384 | | 11.4% |
| 1950 | 5,128 | | −4.8% |
| 1960 | 4,490 | | −12.4% |
| 1970 | 4,443 | | −1.0% |
| 1980 | 5,262 | | 18.4% |
| 1990 | 4,731 | | −10.1% |
| 2000 | 4,633 | | −2.1% |
| 2010 | 4,460 | | −3.7% |
| 2020 | 4,314 | | −3.3% |
Source: US Decennial Census

== Geography ==
According to the 2010 census, the township has a total area of 45.12 square miles (116.9 km^{2}), of which 44.09 square miles (114.2 km^{2}) (or 97.72%) is land and 1.03 square miles (2.7 km^{2}) (or 2.28%) is water. The White River defines the township's northern border, as well as the northern border of Pike County.

=== Cities, towns, villages ===
- Petersburg

=== Unincorporated towns ===
- Alford at 38.491438°N 87.24279°W
- Ashby Yards at 38.474493°N 87.284735°W
- West Petersburg at 38.487549°N 87.289180°W
- Willisville at 38.450882°N 87.295569°W

(This list is based on USGS data and may include former settlements.)

=== Cemeteries ===
The township contains these eight cemeteries: Indian Mound, Johnson, Morrison, Old Town, Old Union, Stuckey, Walnut Hill and Walnut Hill.

=== Major highways ===
- I-69
- SR 56
- SR 57
- SR 61

=== Airports and landing strips ===
- Whiteriver Airfield

=== Lakes ===
- Warner Lake

== School districts ==
- Pike County School Corporation

== Political districts ==
- State House District 64
- State Senate District 48
