= Petersburg, Indiana =

- City
- City of Petersburg
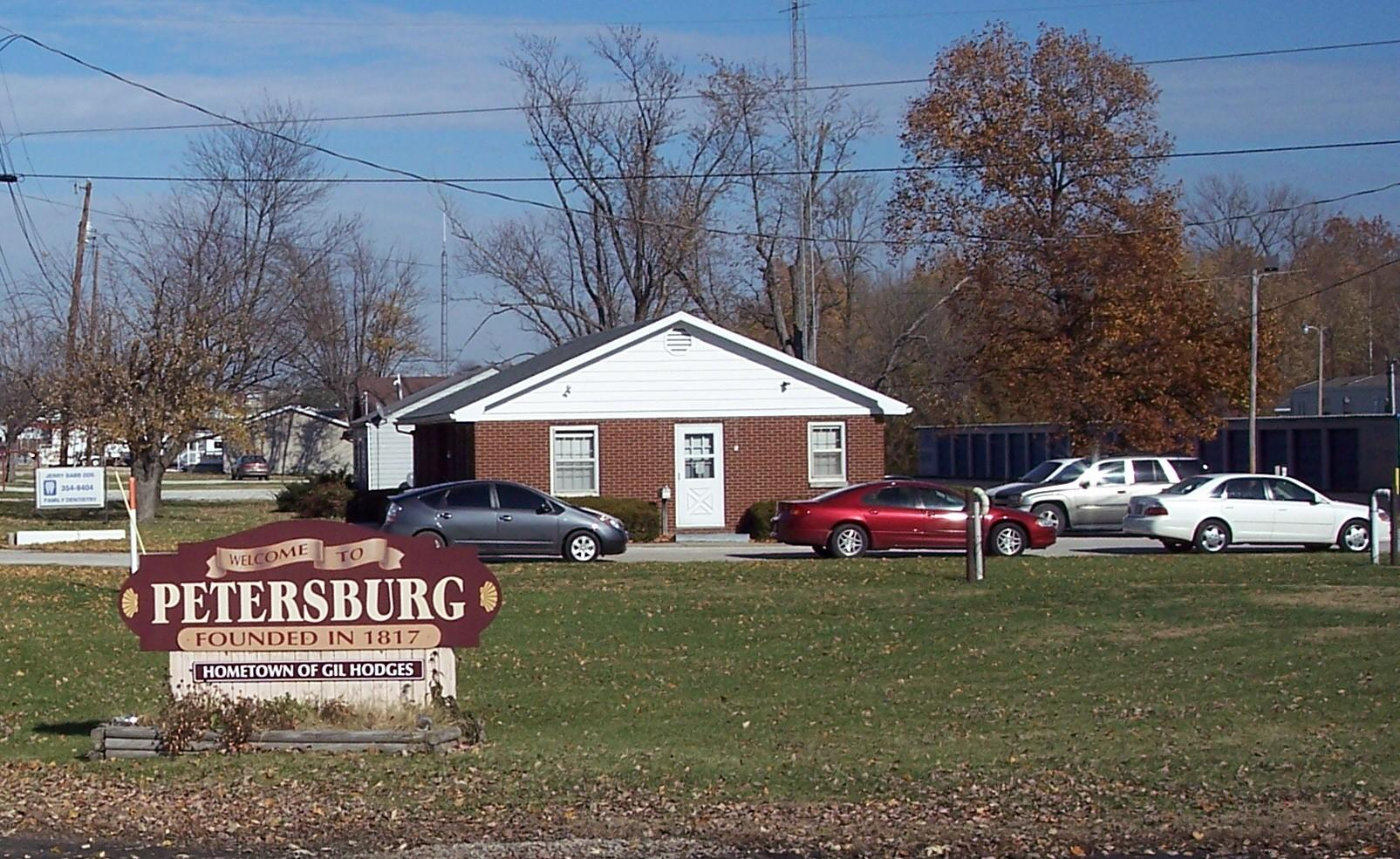

- Location of Petersburg in Pike County, Indiana
- Coordinates: 38°29′45″N 87°17′02″W
- Country: United States
- State: Indiana
- County: Pike
- Township: Washington

Area
  - Total: 1.47 sq mi (3.81 km^{2})
  - Land: 1.47 sq mi (3.80 km^{2})
  - Water: 0 sq mi (0.00 km^{2})
- Elevation: 449 ft (137 m)

Population (2020)
  - Total: 2,304
  - Density: 1,569.3/sq mi (605.91/km^{2})
- Time zone: UTC-5 (EST)
  - Summer (DST): UTC-4 (EDT)
- ZIP code: 47567
- Area code: 812
- FIPS code: 18-59364
- GNIS feature ID: 2396192
- Website: www.petersburg.in.gov

Petersburg is a city within Washington Township and the county seat of Pike County in the U.S. state of Indiana. The population was 2,304 at the 2020 census.

Petersburg is part of the Jasper Micropolitan Statistical Area.

== History ==
Petersburg was laid out in 1817. The city was named for Peter Brenton, an original owner of the town site. A post office has been in operation at Petersburg since 1823. In 1925, Petersburg was spared being the next victim of the deadly Tri-State Tornado as the tornado dissipated a few miles southwest of the city before it could reach Petersburg and unleash the wrath it had delivered to many other towns in Missouri, Illinois, and in Indiana itself.

On the evening of June 2, 1990, a violent F4 tornado impacted the city, killing multiple people and causing major damage to the community.

== Geography ==
According to the 2010 census, Petersburg has a total area of 1.474 square miles (3.82 km^{2}), of which 1.47 square miles (3.81 km^{2}) (or 99.73%) is land and 0.004 square miles (0.01 km^{2}) (or 0.27%) is water. The lower portion of the White River runs through the city.

=== Climate ===
The climate in this area is characterized by hot, humid summers and generally mild to cool winters. According to the Köppen Climate Classification system, Petersburg has a humid subtropical climate, abbreviated "Cfa" on climate maps.

== Demographics ==
Historical population
Census	Pop.	Note	%±
1850	386		—
1860	683		76.9%
1870	923		35.1%
1880	1,193		29.3%
1890	1,494		25.2%
1900	1,751		17.2%
1910	2,170		23.9%
1920	2,367		9.1%
1930	2,609		10.2%
1940	3,075		17.9%
1950	3,035		−1.3%
1960	2,939		−3.2%
1970	2,697		−8.2%
1980	2,987		10.8%
1990	2,449		−18.0%
2000	2,570		4.9%
2010	2,383		−7.3%
2020	2,304		−3.3%
U.S. Decennial Census

=== 2020 census ===
As of the 2020 census, Petersburg had a population of 2,304. The median age was 41.7 years. 21.8% of residents were under the age of 18 and 22.6% of residents were 65 years of age or older. For every 100 females there were 96.8 males, and for every 100 females age 18 and over there were 93.4 males age 18 and over.

0.0% of residents lived in urban areas, while 100.0% lived in rural areas.

There were 1,006 households in Petersburg, of which 26.9% had children under the age of 18 living in them. Of all households, 39.3% were married-couple households, 21.1% were households with a male householder and no spouse or partner present, and 32.9% were households with a female householder and no spouse or partner present. About 35.8% of all households were made up of individuals and 17.5% had someone living alone who was 65 years of age or older.

There were 1,140 housing units, of which 11.8% were vacant. The homeowner vacancy rate was 3.2% and the rental vacancy rate was 10.1%.

Racial composition as of the 2020 census
Race	Number	Percent
White	2,194	95.2%
Black or African American	20	0.9%
American Indian and Alaska Native	8	0.3%
Asian	4	0.2%
Native Hawaiian and Other Pacific Islander	0	0.0%
Some other race	24	1.0%
Two or more races	54	2.3%
Hispanic or Latino (of any race)	45	2.0%

=== 2010 census ===
As the 2010 census, there were 2,383 people, 1,025 households and 592 families living in the city. The population density was 1,621.1 inhabitants per square mile (625.9/km^{2}). There were 1,134 housing units at an average density of 771.4 per square mile (297.8/km^{2}). The racial makeup of the city was 97.7% White, 0.5% African American, 0.3% Native American, 0.5% Asian, 0.2% from other races, and 0.8% from two or more races. Hispanic or Latino of any race were 0.9% of the population.

There were 1,025 households, of which 25.8% had children under the age of 18 living with them, 43.5% were married couples living together, 10.9% had a female householder with no husband present, 3.3% had a male householder with no wife present, and 42.2% were non-families. 37.6% of all households were made up of individuals, and 16.2% had someone living alone who was 65 years of age or older. The average household size was 2.18 and the average family size was 2.89.

The median age was 43.8 years. 20% of residents were under the age of 18; 8.4% were between the ages of 18 and 24; 22.9% were from 25 to 44; 27.6% were from 45 to 64; and 21.1% were 65 years of age or older. The gender makeup was 48.6% male and 51.4% female.

=== 2000 census ===
At the 2000 census, there were 2,570 people, 1,092 households and 670 families living in the city. The population density was 1,755.3 inhabitants per square mile (677.7/km^{2}). There were 1,228 housing units at an average density of 838.7 per square mile (323.8/km^{2}). The racial makeup was 99.07% White, 0.19% African American, 0.04% Native American, 0.04% Pacific Islander, 0.08% from other races, and 0.58% from two or more races. Hispanic or Latino of any race were 0.39% of the population.

There were 1,092 households, of which 24.7% had children under the age of 18 living with them, 47.1% were married couples living together, 11.1% had a female householder with no husband present, and 38.6% were non-families. 35.5% of all households were made up of individuals, and 17.9% had someone living alone who was 65 years of age or older. The average household size was 2.24 and the average family size was 2.88.

21.6% of the population were under the age of 18, 7.5% from 18 to 24, 26.7% from 25 to 44, 23.4% from 45 to 64, and 20.9% who were 65 years of age or older. The median age was 41 years. For every 100 females, there were 94.4 males. For every 100 females age 18 and over, there were 88.4 males.

The median household income was $27,054 and the median family income was $37,460. Males had a median income of $31,510 and females $21,042. The per capita income was $15,158. About 6.7% of families and 11.6% of the population were below the poverty line, including 9.9% of those under age 18 and 16.7% of those age 65 or over.

== Industry ==
One coal-fired power-plant: AES Indiana's Petersburg Generating Station, is within two miles of Petersburg. There are also two coal mines within ten miles of Petersburg. Hoosier Energy's Frank E. Ratts Generating Station was torn down during late 2016 and early 2017 and the site has been graded and seeded.

== Education ==
There is one school district in the county, Pike County School Corporation.

Prior to 1974, Petersburg had its own high school. The school colors were red and white, and the mascot was the Indians (meaning Native Americans). The school absorbed students from Union High School in 1937. In 1974, it merged into Pike Central High School.

Petersburg has a public library, a branch of the Pike County Public Library.

== Notable people ==
- Jody Davis, guitarist for Newsboys
- Samuel Hugh Dillin, judge
- John W. Foster, journalist and diplomat, U.S. Secretary of State
- Thomas L. Hisgen, nominee for President of the United States of the Independence Party in 1908
- Gil Hodges, Hall of Fame baseball player and manager
- Clyde Lovellette, professional basketball player
- Melba Phillips, physicist and science educator
- John Wesley Posey, abolitionist
- Joe Wyatt, professional baseball player
- Derek Lunsford, bodybuilder (2023 Mr. Olympia)
