= Lightsource BP =

Largest solar developer in Europe

Lightsource bp
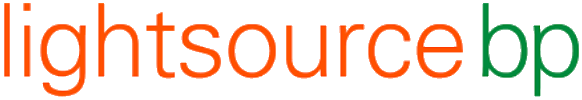
- Formerly: Lightsource Renewable Energy
- Type: Subsidiary
- Industry: Solar power
- Founded: 2010
- Founder: Nick Boyle
- Headquarters: London, United Kingdom
- Key people: Nick Boyle (CEO)
- Products: Electric power
- Services: Development and operation of solar power farms
- Number of employees: ~1000
- Parent: BP
- Website: lightsourcebp.com

Lightsource BP, rebranded from Lightsource Renewable Energy in 2018, is the largest solar developer in Europe, and third largest in the world outside of China. Lightsource BP is a British company with headquarters in London, and offices in Madrid, Milan, Athens, San Francisco, Austin, Philadelphia, Mumbai, New Delhi, Cairo, Melbourne, Amsterdam, Bath, Belfast and Dublin. The company is a subsidiary of BP.

== History ==
The company was founded in 2010 as Lightsource Renewable Energy. In 2011, the company's first solar park was established in Truro. It consists of more than 5,000 panels that can generate enough electricity to supply 430 homes in the area. In 2013, Lightsource completed a 5 MW rooftop solar PV installation at Bentley Motors' factory in Crewe.

In 2016, the company launched Europe's largest floating solar project at the Queen Elizabeth II Reservoir, in Walton-on-Thames.

In 2016, Lightsource completed the Crookedstone Solar Farm, in County Antrim, Northern Ireland, which provides a third of the Belfast International Airport's electricity needs.

In 2017, BP acquired a 43% stake in the company by investing $200 million. The company was subsequently renamed Lightsource BP. At the same year, the company established teams in North America, the Netherlands and India.

In 2018, the company completed its first international installation, a 60 MW solar farm in Maharashtra, India. Lightsource BP won the offtake contract through a 450 MW tender process. The project comprises 200,000 LONGi Solar photovoltaic panels ground-mounted across 240 acres (97 ha). In that year, Lightsource BP also signed a 25-year power purchase and asset acquisition agreement with Mid-Kansas Electric Company in Stanton County, Kansas, United States.

In 2018, Lightsource BP formed EverSource Capital, a partnership with Everstone Group to create a major fund management platform for green energy infrastructure in India. The launch fund for EverSource Capital was the Green Growth Equity Fund, which has a fundraising target of £500 million and joint anchor investments from the UK Government and the India's National Investment and Infrastructure Fund, with a commitment of £120 million each. Also in 2018, the company formed a joint venture Lightsource BP Powered by Hassan Allam Utilities in Egypt with HA Utilities, the utilities subsidiary of Hassan Allam Holding.

In 2019, BP increased its stake in Lightsource BP to 50%.

In 2022 Lightsource BP raised $A540 million to develop two new zero emission projects in the Australian states of New South Wales and Victoria.

The company is 50% owned by Bp Alternative Energy Investments Limited, which in turn is owned by BP International Ltd. In November 2023, bp announced an agreement to acquire full ownership of Lightsource BP, subject to regulatory approvals, to close in mid-2024. Lightsource bp was fully acquired by bp in 2024.

== Operations ==
As of 2018, Lightsource BP has commissioned 1,300 MW of solar capacity and manages about 2,000 MW of solar capacity. It plans to increase the capacity up to 8,000 MW through projects in the Americas, India, Europe and the Middle East.

Alongside funding, developing, constructing and connecting solar installations across the globe, Lightsource BP provides operations and maintenance, and asset management services to solar assets owners in the UK and beyond.
