= AES Indiana =

Utility company in Indianapolis, Indiana, U.S.

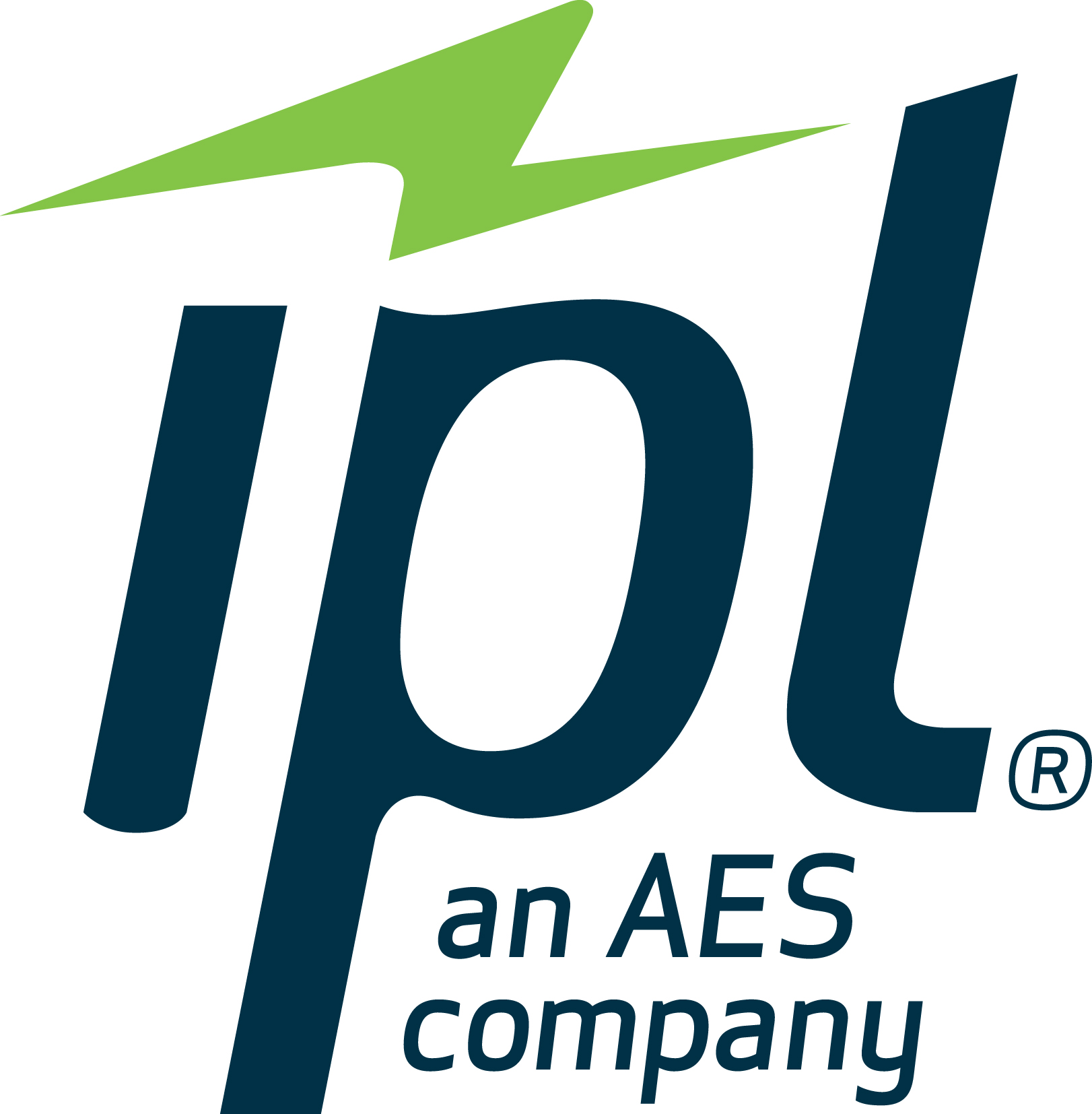

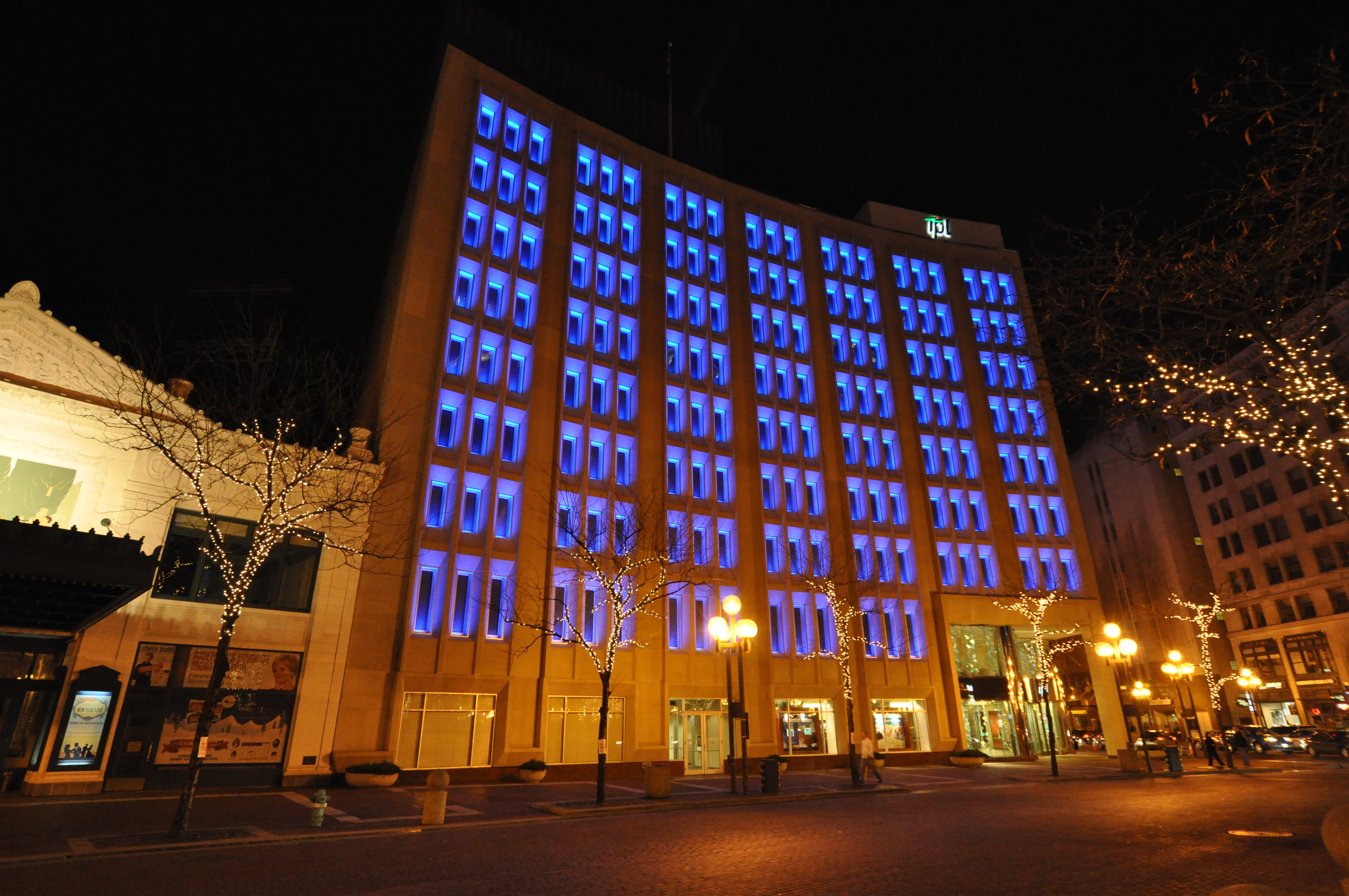
- AES Indiana (then IPL) headquarters in 2009
- Company type: Subsidiary
- Founded: October 1926; 99 years ago
- Headquarters: Indianapolis, Indiana, United States
- Area served: Indianapolis metropolitan area
- Products: Electricity
- Number of employees: 1,500
- Parent: AES Corporation
- Website: aesindiana.com

AES Indiana, formerly known as Indianapolis Power & Light Company (also known as IPL or IPALCO), is an American utility company providing electric service to the city of Indianapolis. It is a subsidiary and largest utility of AES Corporation, which acquired it in 2001. AES Indiana provides electric service to more than 500,000 customers in a 528-square-mile (1,370 km^{2}) service territory.

On February 24, 2021, IPL was rebranded as AES Indiana.

== History ==
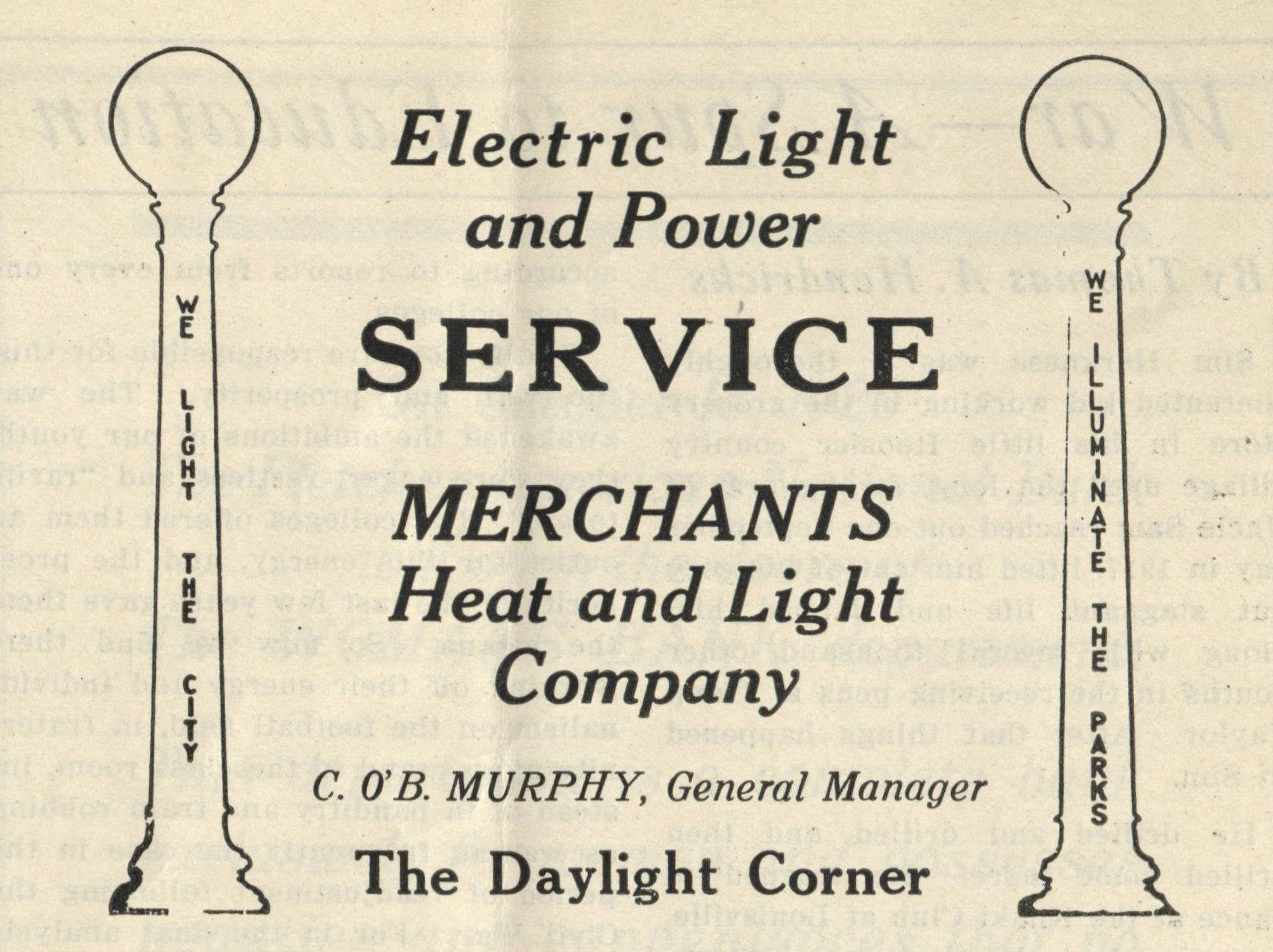
A 1920 newspaper advertisement for Merchant's Heat and Light Company.

AES Indiana was formed as the Indianapolis Power and Light Company in October 1926 by the merger of the Indianapolis Light and Heat Company and the Merchant's Heat and Light Company. Those two companies had started providing electrical service in the 1880s. At the time of the merger, the company had 105,000 customers. In 1937, IPL began a rural electrification program, running power lines to many areas outside Marion County.

The company moved into its present-day headquarters building on Monument Circle in downtown Indianapolis in 1935; the building, now known as the Electric Building, had been constructed in 1924 for the Continental Bank. The building was remodeled in 1968 to a design by Lennox, Matthews, Simmons & Ford, with the lighting design by Norman F. Schnitker.

In the late 1980s, the Internal Revenue Service audited IPL and assessed a tax deficiency on deposits that IPL required of customers with poor credit histories. The ensuing court case, Commissioner v. Indianapolis Power & Light Co., resulted in a United States Supreme Court ruling in 1990 that such customer deposits to a public utility were not taxable income.

In 2008, IPL integrated the world's first grid scale lithium ion battery energy storage system, with four megawatts of battery storage validated for frequency regulation.

IPL was acquired by the AES Corporation in 2001. On February 24, 2021, IPL's name was changed to AES Indiana. At that time the company had 500,000 customers.

On April 25, 2021, the company's Eagle Valley Generating Station's Toshiba steam turbine was unable to resynchronize with the grid when it was restarted after a maintenance outage. The problem was caused by a disconnected wire that "provided false indication to the control system". Repairs to the resulting damage to the rotor and other components was hampered by incorrect wiring diagrams in the system manuals and could not be completed until November 2021. The company's Petersburg Generating Station also was undergoing repairs during part of the time, causing AES to purchase $1 million of electricity to cover the shortage.

In March 2026, a consortium led by BlackRock subsidiary Global Infrastructure Partners and Swedish private equity firm EQT AB agreed to acquire AES Indiana's parent company AES for a total enterprise value of $33.7 billion, including its $22.7bn of debt. AES Indiana, along with AES Ohio, will continue as locally operated and managed regulated utilities.

== Generating plants ==
The company owns and operates three coal-fired generating plants, a combustion turbine, and a wind farm, giving the company a total nameplate generating capacity of 3,513 MW of power.

- Eagle Valley Generating Station is located in Martinsville, Indiana, and has a production capacity of 341 MW of power.
- Harding Street Station is located on the southwest side of Indianapolis and has a production capacity of 1,196 MW of power.
- Petersburg Generating Station is located near Petersburg, Indiana, and has a production capacity of 1,760 MW of power.
- Georgetown Gas Turbine Power Plant is a peaking station located on the northwest side of Indianapolis and has a production capacity of 158 MW of power.
- Hoosier Wind Farm is a joint venture between AES Indiana and enXco, and has a nameplate capacity of 106 MW of power.
