= Sports in Evansville, Indiana =

Evansville, Indiana is the home to two minor league professional sports teams and one amateur sports team. The city is also the home to two NCAA collegiate teams, and nine high schools that participate in the Indiana High School Athletic Association. Evansville is also the host to the annual Hoosier Nationals and Demolition City Roller Derby.

== Professional teams ==
Club	League	Sport	Venue	Established	Championships
Evansville Otters	Frontier League	Baseball	Bosse Field	1995	2 league titles • 5 division titles
Evansville Thunderbolts	SPHL	Ice hockey	Ford Center	2016	2025 presidents cup championship
Midwest Hooligans	UPSL	Soccer	Double Cola Soccer Complex	2021	None

=== Evansville Otters ===
The Evansville Otters are a professional baseball team based in Evansville. The team is part of the west division of the Frontier League. The Otters have won two league titles (2006, 2016) and five division titles (1997, 2000, 2003, 2004, 2006) since their inception in 1995. The team plays at Bosse Field, which has been used for professional baseball since it opened in 1915 and is the third oldest ballpark used for professional baseball on a regular basis in America. The Otters were previously known as the Lancaster Scouts (1993–1994).

=== Evansville Thunderbolts ===
The Evansville Thunderbolts are a professional ice hockey team based in Evansville. The team is part of the Southern Professional Hockey League. The Thunderbolts' home arena is the Ford Center where they play all 28 of their home games. The Thunderbolts replaced the ECHL's Evansville IceMen after the IceMen's owner, Ron Geary, and the city of Evansville failed to come to an agreement for a new lease at the Ford Center during the 2015–16 season.

== Amateur sports ==
Club	League	Sport	Venue	Established	Championships
Demolition City Roller Derby	WFTDA	Roller derby	Soldiers and Sailors Memorial Coliseum	2007	None
Evansville Legends FC	OVPL	Soccer	Old National Bank Field	2021	OVPL title (2021)

=== Demolition City Roller Derby ===
Demolition City Roller Derby is a women's flat-track roller derby league in Evansville, Indiana and a member of the Women's Flat Track Derby Association. They compete at Soldiers and Sailors Memorial Coliseum.

==== Dynamite Dolls ====
The Dynamite Dolls are the A-team for the Demolition City Roller Derby.

==== Destruction Dames ====
The Destruction Dames are the B-team for the Demolition City Roller Derby.

=== Evansville Legends FC ===
The Evansville Legends FC are an amateur soccer team that was formed in 2021 by Marquette soccer alumnus Steve McCullough. The Legends compete in the River Conference of the Ohio Valley Premier League and play home games at Old National Bank Field at Goebel Sports Complex.

== Collegiate sports ==
Evansville has two universities that are members of the NCAA: the University of Evansville (Purple Aces) and University of Southern Indiana (Screaming Eagles). These schools have a combined 9 team national championships.

School	Team	Established	Division	Conference	National Titles	Championship Sport/Years
University of Evansville	Evansville Purple Aces	1854	Div I	MVC	5	Men's Basketball: (5) 1959,* 1960,* 1964,* 1965,* and 1971*
University of Southern Indiana	Southern Indiana Screaming Eagles	1965	Div I	OVC	4	Men's Basketball: (1) 1995* Baseball: (2) 2010,* 2014* Softball: (1) 2018*

*In NCAA Division II

=== Evansville Purple Aces ===
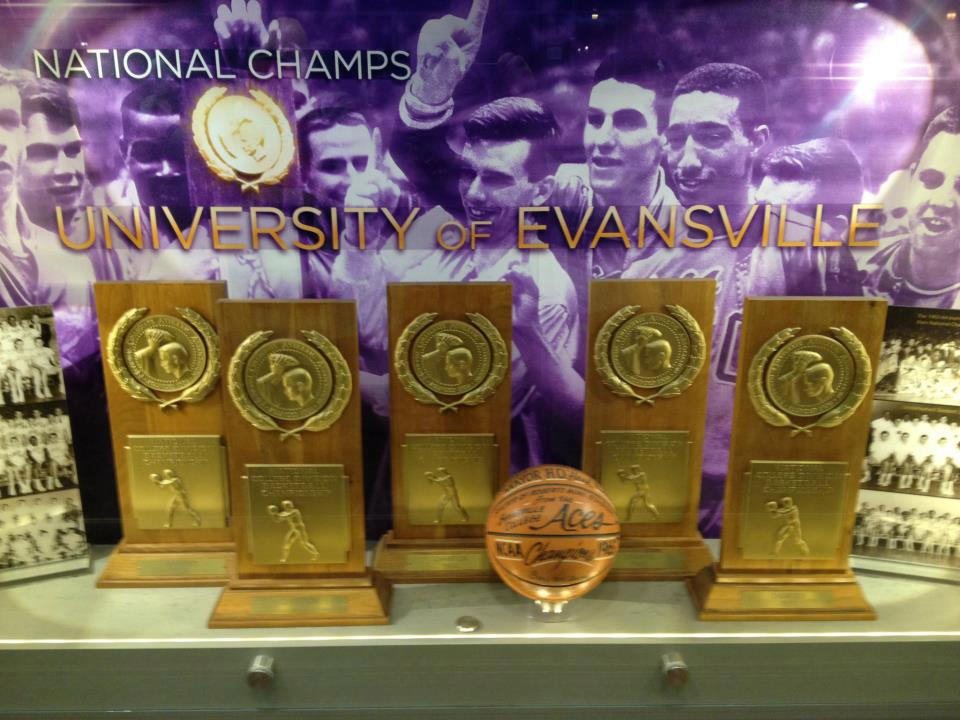
The memorial display case at the Ford Center honoring UE's championship tradition

The University of Evansville (UE) is a member of NCAA Division I and the Missouri Valley Conference. UE has 14 NCAA Division I varsity sports, eight for women and six for men.

The University of Evansville athletics department was built upon a foundation of success in men's basketball, including NCAA College Division (now Division II) national championships in 1959, 1960, 1964, 1965 and 1971. The team was led by legendary coach Arad McCutchan from 1946 to 1977 who led the Purple Aces to a 515–313 record. In 1977 UE began playing in NCAA Division I athletics.

=== Southern Indiana Screaming Eagles ===
The University of Southern Indiana (USI) Athletic Department, currently in NCAA Division I as a member of the Ohio Valley Conference. USI sponsors 15 varsity intercollegiate sports. USI was a member of the Great Lakes Valley Conference of the NCAA Division II from 1970 to 2022, switching to the Division I Ohio Valley Conference on July 1, 2022.

Since 1990, all 15 Screaming Eagles teams have participated in their respective national tournaments and/or were ranked at the national level. USI has claimed four national championships (men's basketball, 1995; baseball, 2010 and 2014; softball, 2018), finished three times as the national finalist (men's basketball, 1994 and 2004; women's basketball, 1997), and earned one third-place finish (men's cross country, 1982).

== Defunct teams ==
Evansville has had a long history with professional sports teams. Past professional organizations have included the NFL, Triple-A minor league baseball, arena football, minor league ice hockey, and professional basketball. Past Evansville major league, minor league, and semi-professional teams have won a combined 17 championships.

=== Baseball ===
Team	Sport	League	Played	Venue	Class	Affiliation	Championships
Evansville	Baseball	Northwestern League	1884	Louisiana Street Park	None	None	None
Evansville Hoosiers	Baseball	CIL	1889	Louisiana Street Park	None	None	None
Evansville	Baseball	Two-I League	1892	Louisiana Street Park	None	None	None
Evansville Blackbirds	Baseball	Southern League	1895	Louisiana Street Park	None	None	None
Evansville River Rats	Baseball	Three-I League Central League	1901–1910	Louisiana Street Park	B	None	Central League title (1908)
Evansville Strikers	Baseball	Central League	1911	Louisiana Street Park	B	None	None
Evansville Yankees	Baseball	KITTY League	1912	Louisiana Street Park	D	None	None
Evansville River Rats	Baseball	Central League	1914–1915	Bosse Field	B	None	Central League title (1915)
Evansville Evas	Baseball	Central League	1916–1917	Bosse Field	B	None	None
Evansville Black Sox	Baseball	Three-I League	1919	Bosse Field	B	None	None
Evansville Evas	Baseball	Three-I League	1920–1923	Bosse Field	B	None	None
Evansville Little Evas	Baseball	Three-I League	1924	Bosse Field	B	None	None
Evansville Pocketeers	Baseball	Three-I League	1925	Bosse Field	B	None	None
Evansville Hubs	Baseball	Three-I League	1926–1931	Bosse Field	B	None	None
Evansville Bees	Baseball	Three-I League	1938–1942	Bosse Field	B	Boston Bees (1938–1940) Boston Braves (1940–1942)	None
Evansville Braves	Baseball	Three-I League	1946–1957	Bosse Field	B	Boston Braves Milwaukee Braves	Three-I League title (1946, 1948, 1956, 1957)
Evansville White Sox	Baseball	Southern League	1966–1968	Bosse Field	AA	Chicago White Sox	None
Evansville Triplets	Baseball	AA	1970–1984	Bosse Field	AAA	Minnesota Twins (1970) Milwaukee Brewers (1971–1973) Detroit Tigers (1974–84)	AA title (1972, 1975, 1979)
Evansville Outlaws	Baseball	NSPBA	1990–2007	Various	Semi-pro	N/A	US Baseball Congress Semi-Pro World Series Champions (1997, 1998, 2001, 2004, 2005, 2007)

=== Football ===
Team	Sport	League	Played	Venue	Championships
Evansville Crimson Giants	Football	NFL	1921–1922	Bosse Field	None
Evansville Vipers	Football	OVFL (2000–2006) MCFL (2006–2007)	2000–2007	Old National Bank Field	None
Evansville BlueCats	Indoor football	NIFL (2003–2005) UIF (2005–2007)	2003–2007	Roberts Municipal Stadium	None
Evansville Express	Football	NWFA	2004– 2005	Old National Bank Field	None
Tri-State Titans	Football	MOFL	2008–2009	Old National Bank Field	None
Ohio River Bearcats	Football	GMFL	2008–2010	Reitz Bowl	GMFL title (2008)
Evansville Enforcers	Football	GMFL	2011–2016	Various	None

=== Basketball ===
Team	Sport	League	Played	Venue
Evansville Agogans	Basketball	NPBL	1950–1951	Central Arena
Evansville Thunder	Basketball	CAB	1984–1986	Roberts Municipal Stadium

=== Ice hockey ===
Team	Sport	League	Played	Venue	Championships
Evansville IceMen	Ice hockey	CHL (2010–12) ECHL (2012–16)	2010–2016	Swonder Ice Arena Ford Center	Davidson Cup title (2010)

=== Soccer ===
Team	Sport	League(s)	Played	Venue
Evansville Crush	PASL	Indoor soccer	2010–2013	Metro Sports Center

== Events hosted ==
=== NCAA events ===
From 1957 to 1975, Evansville hosted the final phase of the NCAA Division II men's basketball tournament, the Elite Eight, at Roberts Municipal Stadium, and then again in 2002. The city is also slated to host the event at the Ford Center in 2014. From 1999 to 2007, Roberts Stadium hosted the Great Lakes Valley Conference basketball tournaments, and in 2013 and 2014 the same event was held at the Ford Center. Since 2018, Ford Center has hosted the Ohio Valley Conference men's and women's tournaments.

A number of Division I NCAA events have been hosted by the city as well. In 1983, Roberts Stadium hosted the first round of the NCAA Men's Division I Basketball Championship, and in 1980 and 1983 it hosted the Midwestern City Conference (now Horizon League) men's basketball conference tournament.

=== Thunder on the Ohio ===
From 1938 to 1940 and 1979 to 2009, Evansville hosted Thunder on the Ohio, a hydroplane boat race in the H1 Unlimited season. The race was held on the Ohio River in downtown Evansville. The winner of Thunder on the Ohio received the Four Freedoms Trophy, which was named after the nearby Four Freedoms Monument which rests along the Ohio River. The race had frequently been broadcast on ESPN and the SPEED television network.

Thunder on the Ohio had been an Unlimited hydroplane mainstay for 30 consecutive years. "Ideal Evansville" replaced Owensboro, Kentucky, on the unlimited calendar in 1979. Evansville was the world headquarters of Atlas Van Lines, Inc., which sponsored Bill Muncey's race team. Muncey played a major role in Evansville being awarded its first sanction.

Prior to Thunder on the Ohio, the 725 Cubic Inch Class boats, the forerunners of the modern unlimiteds, raced at Evansville from 1938 through 1940. Dave Villwock had won more Evansville races than anyone else, including seven with Miss Budweiser.

=== Evansville HydroFest ===
Hydroplane racing returned to Evansville in 2017, with the introduction of the Evansville Hydrofest, an American Power Boat Association event.

=== Refrigerator Bowl ===
From 1948 to 1956, Evanville hosted an annual college football bowl game, the Refrigerator Bowl. Currently, Evansville is the only city in Indiana to have hosted a college football bowl game.

Date played	Winning team		Losing team		Notes
December 4, 1948	Evansville College	13	Missouri Valley College	7	
December 3, 1949	Evansville College	22	Hillsdale College	7	
December 2, 1950	Abilene Christian College	14	Gustavus Adolphus College	7	
December 2, 1951	Arkansas State College	46	Camp Breckinridge	12	
December 7, 1952	Western Kentucky State College	34	Arkansas State College	19	
December 6, 1953	Sam Houston State Teachers College	14	College of Idaho	12	
December 5, 1954	University of Delaware	19	Kent State	7	
December 4, 1955	Jacksonville State Teachers College	12	Rhode Island	10	
December 1, 1956	Sam Houston State Teachers College	27	Middle Tennessee State College	13	

=== The Women's Hospital Classic ===
The Women's Hospital Classic is a tournament for professional female tennis players hosted in Evansville since 1999. The event is classified as an ITF W100 event and is played annually with $100,000 in prize money awarded to the singles and doubles players. Several top WTA players have played in the tournament in the past, such as Ashlyn Krueger, who won in 2022, Madison Keys, a 2010 semifinalist, and McCartney Kessler, a 2023 semifinalist.

== High school state championships ==
Evansville high schools have won 88 team championships. Nine high schools in the city participate in the Indiana High School Athletic Association (IHSAA). These championships consist of 26 soccer titles, 17 football titles, 13 wrestling titles, 9 basketball titles, 6 tennis titles, 9 golf titles, 5 baseball titles, 2 softball titles, and 1 bowling title. Former Evansville IHSAA members include Evansville Rex Mundi and Evansville Lincoln.

School	Established	Conference	State Team Titles	Championship Sport/Years
Evansville Bosse	1924	SIAC	3	Boys Basketball: (3) 1943–44, 1944–45, 1961–62
Evansville Central	1854	SIAC	0	
Evansville Day School	1946	IHSAA-independent	0	
Evansville Harrison	1962	SIAC	2	Girls Golf: (1) 1988–89 Boys Golf: (1) 2011–12
Evansville Mater Dei	1949	SIAC	23	Baseball: (1) 1998–99, 2025–26 Softball: (1) 2015–16 Boys Basketball: (1) 2003–04 Girls Basketball: (2) 2011–12, 2012–13 Football:(2) 2000–01, 2022–23 Wrestling: (13) 1985–86, 1994–95, 1995–96, 1996–97, 1997–98, 1998–99, 1999–00, 2000–01, 2001–02, 2002–03, 2005–06, 2006–07, 2020–21 Girls Soccer: (3) 2017–18, 2018–19, 2019–20
Evansville Memorial	1922	SIAC	38	Baseball: (3) 1977–79, 1988–89, 1992–93 Football: (4) 1937–38*, 1958–59*, 2017–18, 2019–20 Boys Soccer: (16) 1979–80*, 1980–81*, 1981–82*, 1983–84*, 1984–85*, 1986–87*, 1988–89*, 1989–90*, 1990–91*, 1992–93*, 2007–08, 2008–09, 2016–17, 2017–18, 2019–20, 2020–21 Girls Soccer: (7) 1988–89*, 1996–97, 2008–09, 2012–13, 2017–18, 2021–22, 2022–23 Softball: (1) 2001–02 Girls Tennis: (6) 1990–91, 1992–93, 1993–94, 1994–95, 1995–96, 2011–12 Girls Basketball: (1) 2010–11
Evansville North	1956	SIAC	9	Baseball: (1) 1961–62* Boys Basketball: (1) 1966–67 Boys Golf: (1) 1999–00 Girls Golf: (6) 2014–15, 2015–16, 2016–17, 2018–19, 2020–21, 2021–22
Evansville Reitz	1918	SIAC	13	Girls Basketball: (1) 1980–81 Football: (11) 1933–34*, 1940–41*, 1948–49*, 1953–54*, 1956–57*, 1957–58*, 1960–61*, 1961–62*, 1971–72*, 2007–08, 2009–10 Bowling: (1) 2011-12+
Evansville Signature	2002	IHSAA-independent	0	None

* = indicates title won before IHSAA State Tournament was initiated
+ = indicates sanctioned by the Indiana High School Bowling Association

== Notable athletes ==
=== Baseball ===
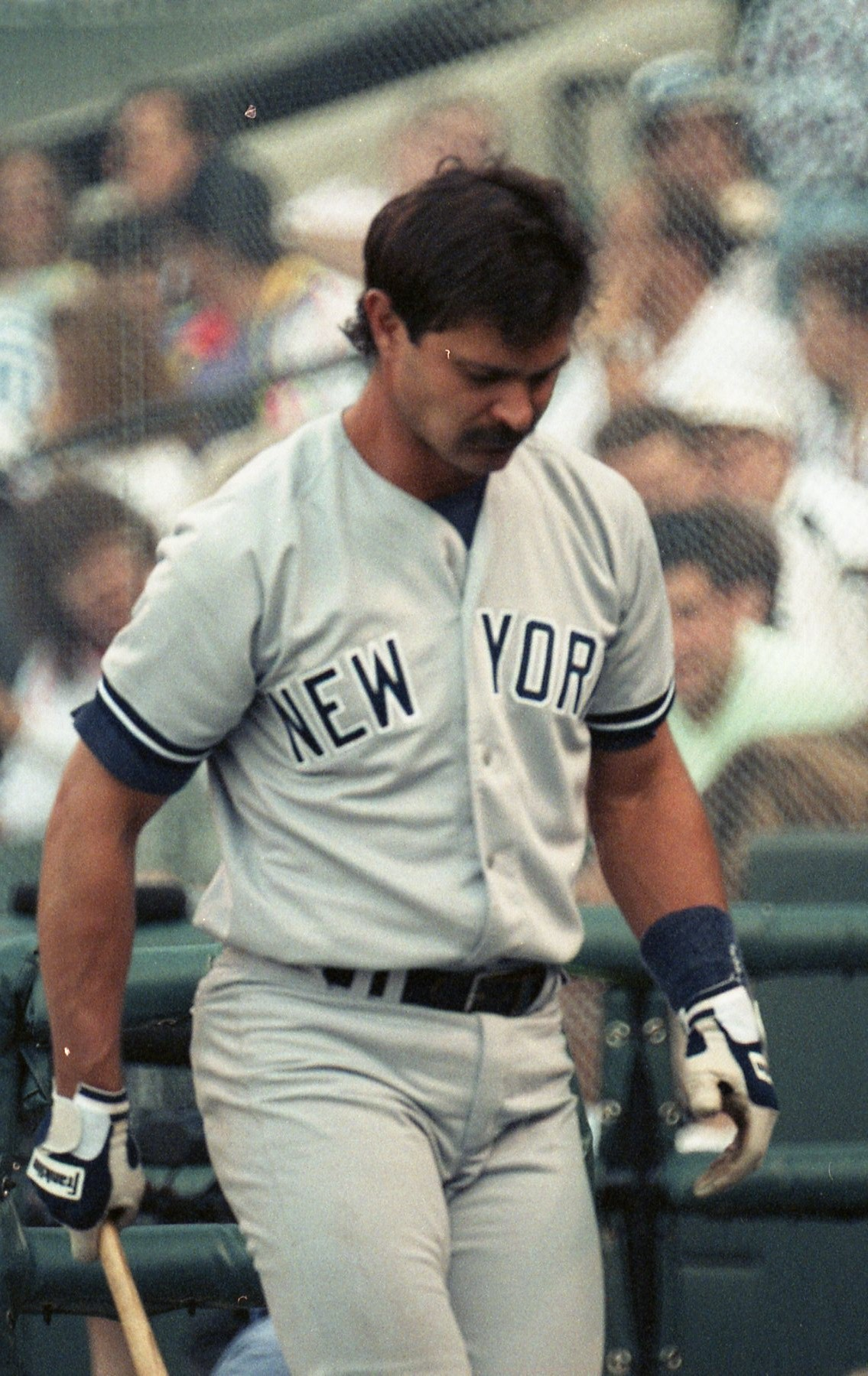
Don Mattingly

- Alan Benes, MLB baseball player
- Andy Benes, MLB baseball player
- Jamey Carroll, MLB baseball player
- Bob Coleman, MLB manager, Evansville minor league baseball coach, Indiana Baseball Hall of Famer
- Charlie Dexter, MLB baseball player
- Jerad Eickhoff, MLB baseball player
- Ervin "Pete" Fox, MLB player
- Charles Knoll, MLB baseball player
- Clarence "Big Boy" Kraft, MLB baseball player
- Don Mattingly, MLB baseball player and coach
- Edd Roush, MLB Baseball Hall of Famer
- Jack Warner, MLB baseball player
- Jeff Schulz, MLB baseball player
- Jim "Lefty" Wallace, MLB baseball player
- Paul Splittorff, MLB baseball player
- Ray Newman, MLB baseball player
- Sam Thompson, MLB Baseball Hall of Fame
- Al Schellhase, MLB baseball player
- Syl "Sammy" Simon, MLB baseball player

=== Basketball ===
- Arad McCutchan, basketball hall of fame coach
- Bob Ford, ABA basketball player; collegiate telecaster
- Calbert Cheaney, NBA basketball player
- Dave Schellhase, NBA basketball player
- David Ragland, NCAA basketball coach
- Don Buse, NBA basketball player and former All Star
- Dru Smith, NBA basketball player
- Gus Doerner, NBA basketball player
- Jerry Sloan, NBA basketball coach
- Larry Humes, NCAA basketball All-American for the University of Evansville
- Marv Bates, Univ. of Evansville basketball sportscaster; former Indiana Sportscaster of the Year
- Ted Bernhardt, NBA basketball referee
- Walter McCarty, NBA basketball player

=== Cycling ===
- Frank Kramer, 18-time national sprint bicycling champion, 2-time Grand Prix de Paris Champion, first American to win the World Professional Sprint Championship, US Bicycling Hall of Famer

=== Football ===
- Billy Hillenbrand, NFL football player
- Bob Griese, NFL All-Star, All-Pro, Hall of Famer
- Budd Boetticher, Ohio State University football player
- Deke Cooper, NFL football player
- Don Hansen, NFL football player
- Don Ping, NCAA football coach
- Doug Bell, NFL football player; Kodak All-American Ball State University
- Kevin Hardy, NFL football player
- Larry Stallings, NFL linebacker
- Ray "Bibbles" Bawel, NFL football player
- Scott Studwell, NFL linebacker
- Sean Bennett, NFL football player

=== Golf ===
- Bob Hamilton, PGA Tour professional golfer; 1944 PGA Championship winner
- Brian Tennyson, PGA Tour, Asian Tour golfer; won 1987 Indian Open & 1987 Philippine Open
- Darrett Brinker, Web.com Tour professional golfer
- Jeff Overton, PGA Tour professional golfer

=== Ice hockey ===
- Kira Hurley, professional ice hockey player for Evansville IceMen, Hockey Hall of Fame

=== Horse Racing ===
- Chic Anderson, sportscaster
- Hillsdale ((Thoroughbred)), one of only 5 horses in history to sweep the prestigious Santa Anita's Strub Stakes Series

=== Soccer ===
- David Weir, European club soccer player, Scotland national team captain, University of Evansville All-American
- Josh Tudela, MLS and USL soccer player
- Scott Cannon, MLS soccer player
- Steve Klein, MLS and USL soccer player

=== Swimming ===
- Lilly King, swimmer, gold medalist at 2016 Summer Olympics in 100m Breaststroke.

=== Tennis ===
- Byron "Buddy" Buckley, Indiana High School Tennis Coaches Hall of Famer
- Louise Owen, tennis player
- Sara Turber, formerly ranked second in the world in Lawn Tennis
- Woodie Sublette-Walker, Chief of tennis officials for the 1996 Olympic Games in Atlanta

=== Track & Field ===
- Charles Hornbostel, United States Olympic Track & Field team member in 1932 and 1936.

=== Wrestling ===
- Andrew Thomas, Total Nonstop Action Wrestling producer and referee
- Ralph Wilson, professional wrestler
- Rudy Charles, Total Nonstop Action Wrestling referee
