= Evansville Legends FC =

- Full name: Evansville Legends FC
- Founded: 2021
- Stadium: Old National Bank Field; Evansville, Indiana
- General manager: Steve McCullough
- Head coach: Jesse Sharp
- League: OVPL
- 2021: 1st
- Website: evvlegendsfc.com

Evansville Legends FC was an American soccer club based in Evansville, Indiana. The team was founded in 2021 by Steve McCullough and competed in the River Conference of the Ohio Valley Premier League. The Legends played their home games on Old National Bank Field at Goebel Soccer Complex.

== History ==
Following the height of the 2020 COVID-19 pandemic, Steve McCullough began training small groups of high school soccer players from throughout the Evansville metropolitan area. As his numbers grew, McCullough began inviting college players from throughout the tristate area to weekly Sunday-night pickup matches at Goebel Soccer Complex.

In response to a rising demand for a more competitive level of soccer in Evansville, he decided to found his own club. McCullough named the club "Legends", paying homage to influential and inspirational players and coaches throughout the history of Evansville soccer. They joined the Ohio Valley Premier League. On March 26, 2021, the Legends announced UE alumnus and former captain Jesse Sharp as head coach. They signed and invited around 40 college and high school players throughout the tristate area, as well some notable alumni.

The team made its debut on May 22, 2021, in a 3–1 loss against Old Bhoys SC, at Cardinal Ritter High School. The Legends went on to go 7-1-1 their debut season, winning the 2021 OVPL Summer Championship, against Ohio Premier SC.

Following the club's 2021 success, manager Steve McCullough began looking for league promotion before the 2022 season.

== Record ==
Season	League								Position		USOC
Season	Div	League	Pld	W	L	D	GD	Pts	Conf.	Overall	USOC
2021	USASA	OVPL	10	7	1	1	+14	22	1st	TBD	DNQ

== Players and staff ==
=== Seniors ===
Player	Origin
Matthew Doty	Evansville, IN.
Travis Wannemhuler	Louisville, KY.
Zach Conroy	Evansville, IN.
Hunter Dewees	Evansville, IN.

To begin their roster, the Legends signed a “senior” group of former pros and local alumni, from throughout the tristate area.

=== Main roster ===
Pos.	Player	Origin
DF	Raph Perez-Colasito	Gilbert, AZ.
MF	Caleb Knight	Carterville, IL.
MF	Simon Paez	Caracas, VE.
DF	Tanner Tichnor	Owensville, IN.
MF	Ian Fierro	Lerma, MX.
GK	Arthur Hill	Porto, PT.
FW	Max Warrin	Henderson KY.
FW	Jacob Boling	Owensboro, KY.
DF	Elijah Easterday	Evansville, IN.
MF	Jaxon Allard	Paducah, KY.
FW	Luke Eppler	Evansville, IN.
FW	Nemanja Gvozdić	Evansville, IN.
DF	Sebastian Ortuno-Barrero	Sucre, BO
DF	Keegan Marx	Evansville, IN.
GK	Michael Bertram	Newburgh, IN.
FW	Zach Schoenstein	Evansville, IN.

Following their senior recruitment, the Legends also signed a roster of U23 players from throughout the tristate and Ohio Valley area. This included players from the University of Evansville, Purdue University Fort Wayne, the University of Southern Indiana, Kentucky Wesleyan College, Hanover College, Wabash College, and Oakland City University.

=== High school roster ===
In order to give opportunities for younger players in Evansville to develop at a higher level, the club extended invitations to some of the best high school and recently graduated talents across the area to come train with the club.

=== Directory ===
Steve McCullough has acted as the club's general manager since its establishment in early 2021. On March 26, 2021, the club signed former pro and local IFJS coach Jesse Sharp as head coach. On March 27 and 28, they signed OCU assistant Ryan Blair, and USI alumnus and former USISL player Travis Marx as assistant coaches and current North Posey coach Ryan Gentil as goalkeeper coach.
