= Midwest Football League =

Midwest Football League may refer to:

- Mid West Football League, an Australian rules football competition based in the Eyre Peninsula region of South Australia
- Midwest Football League (1921–1932), a minor professional American football league that was known as the Chicago Football League, in which the Chicago Cardinals played, from 1904 to 1920
- Midwest Football League (1935–1940), a minor professional American football league
- Midwest Football League (1962–1978), a minor professional American football league
- Midwest Professional Football League (1970–1972), a minor professional American football league in which the Omaha Mustangs played
- Midwest Football League (2002–), a semi-professional American football league whose Ohio River Bearcats team played at the Goebel Soccer Complex

== See also ==
- Midwest Football Conference, a conference in the National Junior College Athletic Association
