= Devin Moore =

Devin Moore may refer to:

- Devin Moore (running back) (born 1985), American football running back
- Devin Moore (cornerback) (born 2003), American football cornerback
- Devin Moore (murderer) (born 1985), American convicted murderer from Alabama
