= Preston Mattingly =

American baseball executive (born 1987)

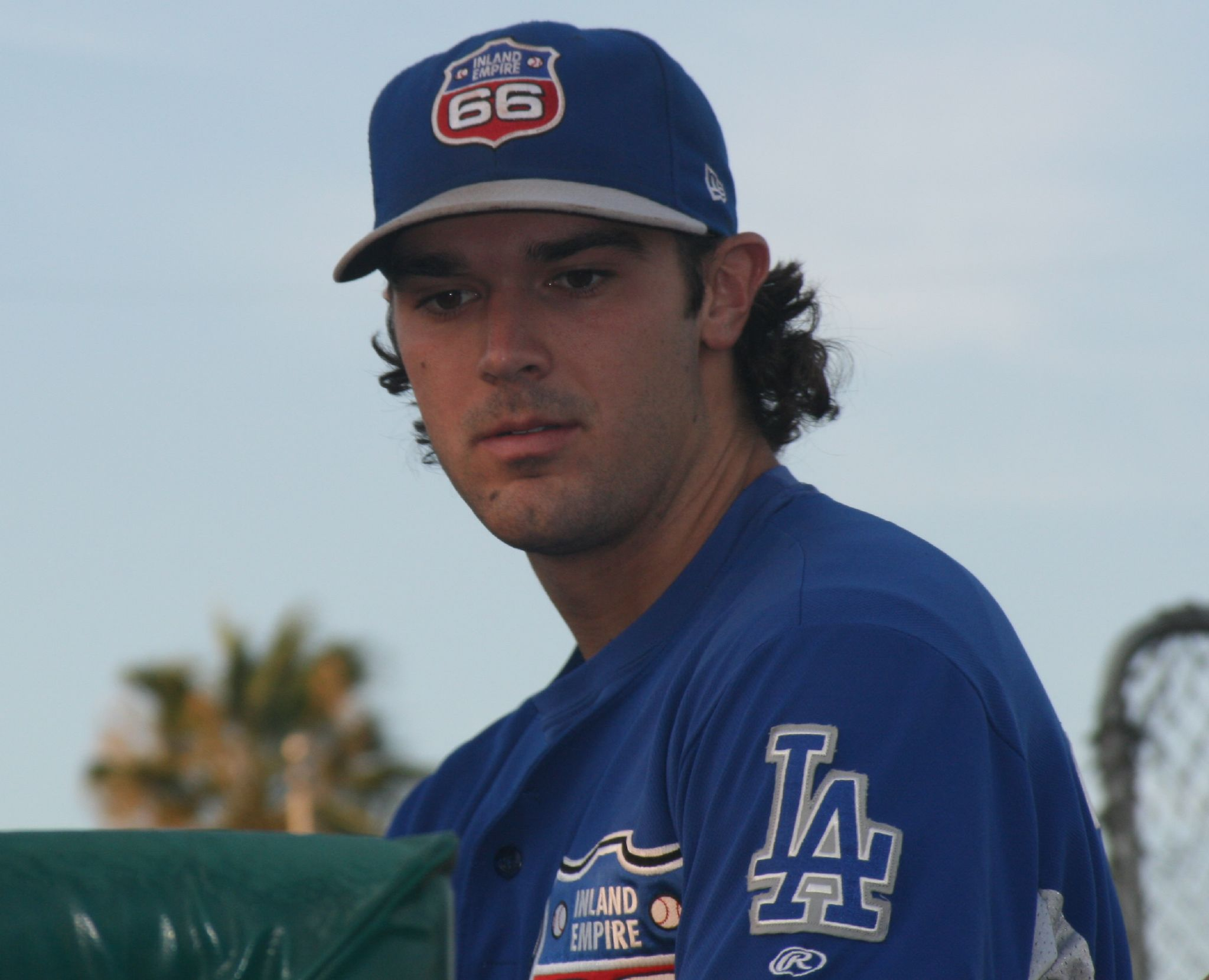
- Mattingly in 2009

Philadelphia Phillies
- General manager
- Born: August 28, 1987 (age 39); Englewood, New Jersey, U.S.
- Bats: Right Throws: Right
- Stats at Baseball Reference

Teams
- As general manager: Philadelphia Phillies (2025–present)

Preston Michael Mattingly (born August 28, 1987) is an American professional baseball executive who is the general manager for the Philadelphia Phillies of Major League Baseball. He is also a former second baseman. He is the son of Don Mattingly.

== Early life ==
Mattingly is the son of Kim and Don Mattingly. He was born on August 28, 1987, while his father played in Major League Baseball (MLB) for the New York Yankees. He has two brothers: Taylor and Jordon.

== Career ==
Mattingly attended Evansville Central High School, where he played for the school's football, baseball and basketball teams. He also played basketball in the Amateur Athletic Union. In his senior year, Mattingly averaged 20.9 points per game for the basketball team. Pat Knight recruited him to play college basketball at Texas Tech University. He instead signed a letter of intent to play college baseball for the University of Tennessee.

The Los Angeles Dodgers selected Mattingly in the first round, with the 31st overall selection, of the 2006 MLB draft. He signed with the Dodgers, receiving a $1 million signing bonus. He had a .290 batting average with the rookie-level Gulf Coast League Dodgers after signing. However, he struggled in Single-A from 2007 to 2010. He batted .210 with the Great Lakes Loons in 2007 and .224 in 2008. With the Inland Empire 66ers, he batted .238 with 150 strikeouts in 2009 and batted .194 in 2010.

On September 26, 2010, the Dodgers traded Mattingly to the Cleveland Indians for minor leaguer Roman Pena. The Indians released him in April 2011, before the season, and the Dodgers re-signed him. He played for Great Lakes and the Rancho Cucamonga Quakes in 2011 and batted .232. On January 11, 2012, the Yankees signed Mattingly to a minor league contract. They released him on March 27.

In July 2013, Mattingly received an athletic scholarship from Lamar University to play college basketball for the Lamar Cardinals basketball team as a guard. Knight was the coach of the Cardinals. Mattingly became the team captain for the Cardinals and graduated from Lamar in 2016.

== Executive career ==
After graduating from Lamar, Mattingly worked for the San Diego Padres as manager of scouting for three years and then as coordinator of major league advance scouting and game planning for two years. In September 2021, the Philadelphia Phillies hired him as their director of player development. In November 2023, he was promoted to assistant general manager.

On November 8, 2024, Mattingly was promoted to general manager of the Phillies, as Sam Fuld transitioned to the role of president of business operations for the team.
