= EVSC Fields =

Soccer complex in Evansville, Indiana

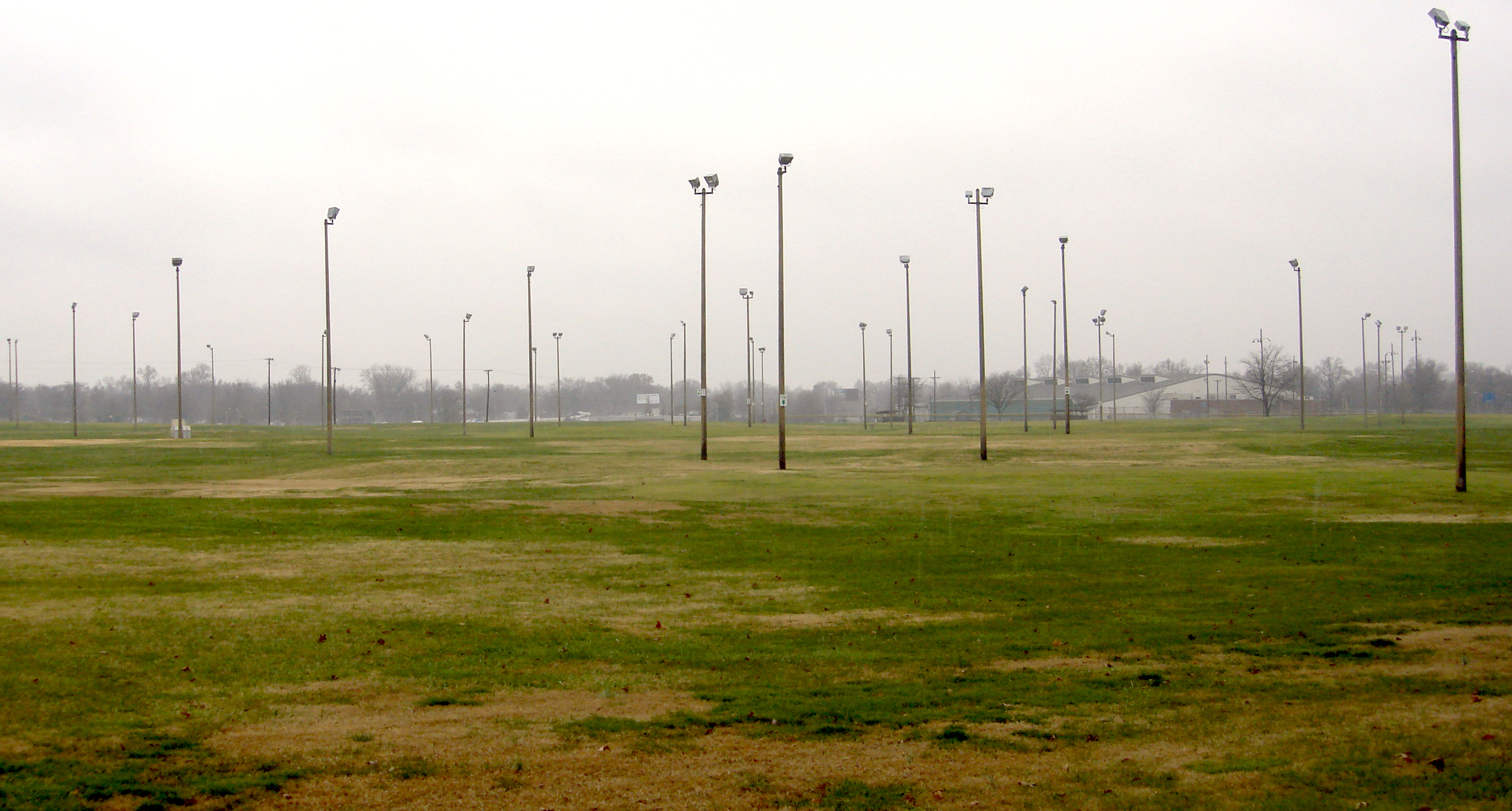
- EVSC Fields in December 2013
- Interactive map of EVSC Fields
- Location: Evansville, Indiana, USA
- Coordinates: 37.979424°N 87.512043°W
- Owner: Evansville Vanderburgh School Corporation
- Operator: Evansville Vanderburgh School Corporation
- Surface: Bermuda grass
- Public transit: METS

Tenants
- EVSC and parochial high schools

EVSC Double Cola Soccer Complex is a high school soccer complex located in Evansville, Indiana near the old site of Roberts Stadium. Owned and operated by the Evansville Vanderburgh School Corporation, the facility serves as a home, or alternate field, for EVSC schools. Double Cola is the frequent host of the IHSAA soccer sectional 16.

== See also ==
- Sports in Evansville
- Goebel Soccer Complex
