= Hoosier Nationals =

- Sport: National Bicycle League
- Country: USA
- Website: Hoosier Nationals website

Also see: Sports in Evansville.

The Hoosier Nationals is a BMX National Series race that is a part of the National Bicycle League racing schedule. The Hoosier Nationals take place on the BMX course at Burdette Park in Evansville, Indiana. The National Series races are the highest level or racing in the US for BMX.
