= Brain Game (1972 game show) =

- Directed by: Valerie Jackson-Sims
- Starring: Chuck Lofton
- Judges: Dr. Matthew Shaw
- Country of origin: United States

Production
- Running time: 30 minutes

Original release
- Network: WTHR (NBC)
- Release: 1972 – present

The Brain Game is a weekly quiz bowl show for high school students that airs on NBC-affiliate WTHR-13 in Indianapolis, Indiana. Originally called Exercise in Knowledge when introduced in 1972 (under the station's prior call letters, WLWI), the Brain Game is currently broadcast at 7 pm on Saturdays, and is hosted by WTHR morning meteorologist Chuck Lofton. It is sponsored by Westfield Insurance, which also sponsors four other high school quiz shows. The show is filmed at the WTHR studios on Meridian Street in Indianapolis. The Brain Game has been filmed in HD since 2008.

Chuck Lofton has hosted the Brain Game since 2013, taking over for meteorologist Chris Wright who hosted from 2000 to 2013. Bob Gregory hosted for 28 years, from the show's start in 1972 until 2000. Until 2008 the show was filmed at the Fairbanks Center at Butler University.

The Brain Game was nominated for a Regional Emmy in 2001 for best On Camera Talent - Non News, in 2003 for best Children/Youth Program - Regularly Scheduled, in 2004 for best Children/Youth Program - Regularly Scheduled, and in 2007 for best Children/Youth Program.

Due to renovations at the WTHR-13 TV station, the 2017-18 Brain Game season will be on hiatus. The Westfield Insurance group has pulled sponsorship of the contest.

== Rules ==
Two teams of four players each compete during each show. Teams may buzz in and attempt to answer at any time while a question is being read. Team members may not confer prior to answering. Questions are selected by the show's judge, Dr. Matthew Shaw from the University of Indianapolis, who took over from Dr. David Wantz from the University of Indianapolis. Dr. Phil Young from the University of Indianapolis was the judge from the early 1990s until his death on January 7, 2009. Don Hanlin, founder of the White River Academic League and Indiana Quiz Bowl, and Christine Guyonneau of the University of Indianapolis were the interim judges.

The overall format of the show is a single-elimination tournament with five rounds. The bracket involves 48 teams playing 47 matches in 31 episodes; episodes of the first round of the season consist of two fifteen-minute matches with the winner of the first match playing the bye team in the second match. Games in the next four rounds of the tournament have two teams competing the entire thirty minutes.

== Format ==
The show's format consists of approximately 120 questions drawn from many topics, each worth one point. About 75 of these are general toss-ups for all players. Special questions are also asked throughout the show.

Minute quiz - The team in the lead going into the minute quiz selects either packet A or packet B. They are then given one minute (thirty seconds in the first round) to answer as many one-point questions as possible. Questions may be passed, but they will not be returned to. When time is up, the host will finish the last question and the team still has a chance to answer. The other team then has the remaining packet of questions. There is one minute quiz per match. Teammates may confer, and the captain must give all responses.

Face-off - Each episode has two face-off rounds, in which four questions all related to a single topic are asked. However, each question is given to only one player on each team.

Bonus qualifier - There are usually four bonus qualifiers per episode. A general question, usually slightly harder than other questions, is asked, worth one point. The first team to correctly respond earns a more difficult bonus question that is worth two points, that is similar in category to the question that was answered. Teammates may confer, and the captain must give all responses. Only the team that answered the qualifier question has a chance for the two bonus points.

Who am I? - This is a three-part question that the host reads in first person. If a player can correctly identify the person after hearing only the first part of the question, he scores three points for the team, after the second part two points, and the third part one point. "Who am I?" is not asked in the first round.

Three-point judge's question - This is one part and is worth three points. It is generally one of the hardest questions of the game and is specially written by the judge. It is usually asked toward the end of the match. The three-point judge's question is not asked in the first round.

== Participants and winners ==
Teams that participate in Brain Game come from the WTHR viewing area in Central Indiana.

=== Recent champions ===
Years are listed based on when the school year started, e.g. 2006 for the 2006–2007 school year.

Year	Winner	Runner-up
1988	Scecina Memorial High School 54	Carmel High School 52
1989	Scecina 54	Lawrence Central High School 42
1990	Shelbyville High School 68	Lawrence North High School 42
1991	Perry Meridian High School 78	Franklin Central High School 56
1992	Perry Meridian 62	Noblesville High School 50
1993	Perry Meridian 86	Lawrence North 52
1994	Park Tudor School 86	Lawrence Central 52
1995	Cathedral High School 72	Perry Meridian 46
1996	Southport High School 74	Cathedral 52
1997	Park Tudor 68	Westfield High School 44
1998	Perry Meridian 75	Center Grove High School 62
1999	Park Tudor 80	North Central High School 64
2000	Park Tudor 70	Southport 38
2001	Park Tudor 141	Cathedral 59
2002	Park Tudor 70	Southport 38
2003	Park Tudor 74	Pike High School 63
2004	Park Tudor 45	Brebeuf Jesuit Preparatory School 42
2005	Brebeuf Jesuit 70	Warren Central High School 40
2006	Brebeuf Jesuit 50	Cathedral 38
2007	Pike 45	Franklin Central 38
2008	Center Grove 47	Franklin Central 43
2009	Zionsville Community High School 46	Hamilton Southeastern High School 42
2010	Cardinal Ritter High School 47	Hamilton Southeastern 44
2011	North Central 38	Cardinal Ritter 33
2012	North Central 40	Carmel 36
2013	North Central 39	Avon High School 36
2014	North Central 48	Zionsville Community High School 31
2015	North Central 35	Anderson High School 34

== Prizes ==
Westfield Insurance sponsors the Brain Game and provides cash prizes for the schools of the top eight winning teams. The first-place team earns $4,000 for the school, and the runner-up earns $3,000. The two semi-finalists each receive $2,500. The four teams that lost in the quarterfinals, fifth place to eighth place, receive $2,000 each. This money is meant for the school's general academic fund; 20% of the funds may be used for the Brain Game team, with the remainder to be used for library resources, safety or community development or used to fulfill a need that the school and Westfield Insurance can agree upon. The championship team also receives the Bob Gregory Trophy with a plaque, and finalists receive plaques. Each team in the top eight also receives a small stipend from WTHR-13 to fund a thank-you party for participating in the program. All players in most rounds also receive small prizes for their participation, such as backpacks, hats, water bottles, USB drives, sweatshirts, or blankets that have the Brain Game or Westfield Insurance logo on them. If a team wins three years in a row (North Central High School was the last one), they keep the Bob Gregory Trophy for their school.

== Notable players ==
- Ron Klain, Chief of Staff to Vice Presidents Al Gore and Joe Biden, was on the North Central High School team that won runner-up in the 1978–79 season.
