= Evansville Express =

- Founded: 2004
- League: National Women's Football Association
- Team history: Evansville Express 2004-2005
- Based in: Evansville, Indiana
- Stadium: Goebel Soccer Complex
- Colors: Purple & Gold

Also see: Sports in Evansville.

The Evansville Express were a full-contact women's outdoor football team of the National Women's Football Association. The team officially became part of the NWFA and began playing league games in 2004. The Express disbanded following the 2005 season.

Home games for the Express were played at the Goebel Soccer Complex multipurpose field in Evansville, Indiana.

== Season-By-Season ==
Season records
Season	W	L	T	Finish	Playoff results
Evansville Express (NWFA)
2003	0	7	0	4th Southern Midwest	--
2004	0	8	0	3rd Southern Midwest	--
Totals	0	15	0	(including playoffs)	
