= Metro Sports Center =

Coordinates: 37.983535°N 87.480080°W

- Interactive map of Metro Sports Center
- Location: Evansville, Indiana, USA
- Capacity: 500
- Public transit: METS

Tenants
- Evansville Crush (PASL) (2010-present); Evansville Rage (CIFL) (2012)

Metro Sports Center is a multi-purpose athletic facility located in Evansville, Indiana. The facility has two indoor fields, one field at 180' x 80' and a smaller field at 81' x 51'. It has four baseball cage and pitching areas for use.

== Professional teams ==
The facility is formerly home to the Evansville Crush of the Premier Arena Soccer League. The facility was planned to be home to the Evansville Rage, a professional indoor football team in the Continental Indoor Football League in 2012, but the high demand for tickets made the franchise switch to Swonder Ice Arena.

== See also ==
- Sports in Evansville
