= Ohio Valley Premier League =

Soccer league in Ohio, U.S.

- Founded: 2019
- Country: United States
- Confederation: CONCACAF
- Number of clubs: Men - 22; Women - 12
- Domestic cup(s): U.S. Open Cup; National Amateur Cup
- Current champions: Northern Kentucky Nitro (2025)
- Most championships: Ohio Premier (2)
- Top scorer: Fin Sallows (24)
- Broadcaster(s): YouTube.com
- Website: ovplsoccer.com
- Current: N/A

The Ohio Valley Premier League (OVPL) is a USASA-affiliated league through US Club Soccer that includes teams from Indiana, Kentucky, Ohio, Pennsylvania, and West Virginia. The regular season of the OVPL runs May through July.

The men's division was announced in November 2019 and the women's division was announced in February 2020. Both were due to begin play in summer 2020. Due to the COVID-19 pandemic, the summer season was cancelled and a fall season was started. In 2021, the OVPL also hosted a spring season.

== Background ==
The OVPL is a competitive soccer circuit to offer the only amateur competition throughout the Ohio Valley (Indiana, Kentucky, Ohio, Pennsylvania, West Virginia) region.

The Ohio Valley Premier League (OVPL) has received sanctioning from US Club Soccer and is set to kick off in May 2020. A first of its kind in the region, the OVPL will seek to provide a competitive league for players of all ages, beginning with a competitive amateur men's division.

As a league, the OVPL will operate within Indiana, Kentucky, Ohio, Pennsylvania, and West Virginia to help local communities grow the beautiful game through competitive matches and local soccer culture. The amateur men's division allows for players as young as sixteen (16) years old to compete in a structure that provides an opportunity for competition in the country's longest-running tournament in the Lamar Hunt US Open Cup. Due to the structure of the OVPL, no players will jeopardize amateur status within their youth clubs, high schools, or universities.

With the sanctioning of the OVPL through US Club Soccer, the regionalized league is a first of its kind for the Ohio Valley area.

== Clubs ==
=== Current ===
Men's Division

Team	City	Stadium	Founded	Joined OVPL	Head coach	Other Affiliation
Indy Saints FC	Indianapolis, IN	Cardinal Ritter High School	2017	2020	TBD	WPSL
Lexington Landsharks	Lexington, KY	Transylvania University	2019	2020	TBD	N/A
Cincy SC	Cincinnati, OH	TBD	2015	2020	TBD	N/A
Valhalla FC	Milford, OH	Milford High School	2018	2020	TBD	N/A
Cincinnati Swerve	Fairfield, OH	Fairfield High School	2015	2020	Rudy Argueta	PASL
Ohio Premier Soccer Club	Plain City, OH	OP Training Facility	1993	2020	TBD	ECNL
Croatia Juniors	Mentor, OH	Mentor High School	1957	2020	TBD	GLA/NPL
Ohio Galaxies FC	Dayton, OH	DOC Stadium	1974	2020	Arturo Rodriguez	USL2
Hoosier FC	Noblesville, IN	TBD	2003	2020	TBD	N/A
Cincinnati Saints SC	Crestview Hills, KY	Thomas More University	2020	2020	TBD	N/A
Clermont County FC	Batavia, OH	TBD	2020	2020	Tim Farrell	N/A
Dana Gardens FC/Xavier Club	Norwood, OH	Xavier University	2020	2020	Steve Abbenhaus	N/A
Northern Kentucky FC	Highland Heights, KY	Highland Heights Soccer Field	2015	2020	Sean Eubanks	N/A
Cleveland Force SC	Willoughby, OH	Lost Nation Sports Park	TBD	2021	Bill Lawrence	USL2
Soccer Field Academy	Grove City, OH	Grove City Christian School	2016	2021	James Field	Super Y League
Century United	Pittsburgh, PA	Century Field	1984	2021	John Lichina	WPSL
Blast FC	Marengo, OH	Highland High School	1986	2021	TBD	TBD
Evansville Legends FC	Evansville, IN	Old National Bank Field	2021	2021	Jesse Sharp	TBD
Club Ohio	Dublin, OH	TBD	1997	2021	TBD	TBD
Wheeling Highlanders FC	Wheeling, WV	East Wheeling Turf Field	2021	2021	Ryan Wall	N/A
Old Bhoys SC	Indianapolis, IN	Cardinal Ritter High School	2017	2021	Steve Bushre	N/A
University of Cincinnati Men's Club Soccer	Cincinnati, Ohio	Gettler Stadium	2001	2021	Randy Anderson	Midwest Alliance Soccer Conference
Ambassadors FC Ohio (AFC Ohio)	Macedonia, Ohio	Pioneer Park / CVCA Stadium	1990 (as Ambassadors in Sport) / 2021 (as AFC Ohio)	2022	Ryan Dean	NOSL

Women's Division

Team	City	Stadium	Founded	Joined OVPL	Head coach	Other Affiliation
Lexington Fillies	Lexington, KY	Transylvania University	2019	2020	Jim Borman	N/A
Cincinnati Sirens FC I	Fairfield, OH	Fairfield High School	2016	2020	Jake Morrison	WPSL/PASL
Cincinnati Saints SC	Crestview Hills, KY	Thomas More University	2020	2020	TBD	N/A
Cincinnati Saints SC II	Crestview Hills, KY	Thomas More University	2020	2020	TBD	N/A
Cleveland Ambassadors FC I	Macedonia, OH	Nordonia High School	1990	2020	TBD	WPSL
Club Ohio	Dublin, OH	TBD	1997	2021	TBD	TBD
Empire FC	Bridgeport, WV	Bridgeport Recreational Complex	2018	2021	Hannah Abraham	TBD
Ohio Premier Soccer Club	Plain City, OH	OP Training Facility	1993	2021	TBD	ECNL
Cincinnati Sirens FC II	Fairfield, OH	Fairfield High School	2016	2021	TBD	PASL
Ohio Galaxies FC	Dayton, OH	DOC Stadium	1974	2021	Javier Iriart	WPSL
Croatia Juniors	Mentor, OH	Mentor High School	1957	2021	TBD	GLA/NPL

=== Former ===
Team	Founded	Joined OVPL	Left OVPL	Other Affiliation	Notes
Cincinnati Dutch Lions	2013	2020	2020	USL League Two	Club folded
FC Pride	2001	2020	2021	WPSL	Hiatus
Kings Hammer SC	2012	2020	2021	USL2/USLW	Hiatus
1927 SC	1927	2022	2022	N/A	Moved to Midwest Premier League

== Champions ==
Season	League Champions	River Division	Valley Division
2025	Northern Kentucky Nitro	Northern Kentucky Nitro	Ohio Premier
2024 Summer	Ohio Premier	Valhalla Fc	Ohio Premier
2023 Summer	Ohio Premier	Valhalla FC	Spire Academy
2022 Summer	1927 SC	1927 SC	Wheeling Highlanders FC
2021/22 Fall/Spring	Valhalla FC	N/A	N/A
2021 Summer	Evansville Legends FC	Evansville Legends FC	Ohio Premier
2021 Spring	Ohio Galaxies FC	N/A	N/A
2020 Fall	Kings Hammer SC	N/A	N/A
2020 Summer	Pandemic cancelled	N/A	N/A

Summer season is split into Valley and River Divisions.

== Notable players ==
- Enrico del Rosario (Northern Kentucky FC), 2021–present, Northern Mariana Islands National Team
- (United States) Manny Adjei, 2021–present, U.S. 6 National Team
- (Nigeria) Kalu Abass (Northern Kentucky FC), 2021–present, member of MASL Cincinnati Swerve
- (United States) Andrej Novakovic (Northern Kentucky FC), 2020–present, member of MASL Cincinnati Swerve since 2021
- (United States) Bryce Day (Northern Kentucky FC), 2021–present, member of Cincinnati Dutch Lions FC in 2019
- (United States) Andrew Norman (soccer player) (Northern Kentucky FC), 2021–present, member of Cincinnati Swerve PASL from 2017-20
- (United States) Ryan Gray (Northern Kentucky FC), 2021–present, member of Cincinnati Swerve PASL from 2017-21
- (United States) Sean Eubanks (Northern Kentucky FC), 2020–present, member of Cincinnati Swerve PASL since 2020
- (England) Paul Nicholson (Kings Hammer SC), 2020, retired who played in the United Soccer League from 2011 to 2017.

== Notable former players ==
- (United States) Jacob Goodall, Kings Hammer SC - 2021, signed in 2021 by Greenville Triumph SC ( (United States) )
- (United States) Cameron Cool, Lexington Landsharks - 2020, signed in 2020 by SC Hansa von 1911 e.V ( (Germany) )
- (South Africa) Rizwaan Dharsey, Kings Hammer SC - 2021, signed in 2021 by Vitória Futebol Clube - Pico ( (Portugal) )
- (United States) Max Miller, Lexington Landsharks - 2021, signed in 2022 by FC Cincinnati 2 ( (United States) )
- (United States) Mohammedi Alkhateeb, West Virginia Highlanders FC - 2021, signed in 2022 by KF Trepça ( (Kosovo) )
- (United States) Josue Dubon, Evansville Legends FC - 2021, signed in 2023 by AD Chalatenango ( (El Salvador) )
- (United States) Diallo Irakoze, Lexington Landsharks - 2020, signed in 2023 by Lexington Sporting Club ( (United States) )
- (Uganda) Abubakar Kasule, Northern Kentucky Nitro FC - 2022, signed in 2022 by Express FC ( (Uganda) )
- (United States) Sam Robinson, Kings Hammer SC - 2023, international call-up to Puerto Rico men's national soccer team
- (England) Laurence Wootton, Ohio Premier - 2023, MLS SuperDraft Pick (Round 3, Pick 6; 64th Overall) by Chicago Fire FC ( (United States) )
