= Evansville Crush =

- Full name: Evansville Crush
- Nickname: Crush
- Founded: 2010
- Dissolved: 2013
- Ground: Metro Sports Center
- Capacity: 500
- Owner(s): Andy Hines; Jeff Fossett; Kip Husk
- League: Premier Arena Soccer League
- 2012-2013: 9th Midwest Conference

The Evansville Crush was an American indoor soccer team, founded in 2010. The team was a member of the Premier Arena Soccer League (PASL-Premier), the development league for the Professional Arena Soccer League (PASL), and played in the Midwest Conference. They played their home matches at the Metro Sports Center in the city of Evansville, Indiana. Before the start of the 2010 season, the Crush hosted the Hoosier Cup tournament with six Midwest clubs. They would go undefeated in the knockout rounds and beat the Louisville Lightning in overtime of championship game. In 2013, the team was replaced by the Evansville Kings but lasted only one season.

== Year-by-year ==
=== Regular season ===
Year	Win	Loss	Tie	Points	League	Conference	Reg. season	Playoffs
2010–2011	5	2	1	16	PASL-Premier	Midwest	2nd Midwest	Elimination round
2011–2012	1	7	0	3	PASL-Premier	Midwest	5th Midwest	DNQ
2012–2013	1	6	1	4	PASL-Premier	Midwest	9th Midwest	DNQ
Total	7	15	2					

=== Playoff record ===
Year	Win	Loss	Tie	GF	GA	GD
2010–2011	1	2	-	16	23	

== See also ==
- Sports in Evansville
