= Don Mattingly =

American baseball player and manager (born 1961)

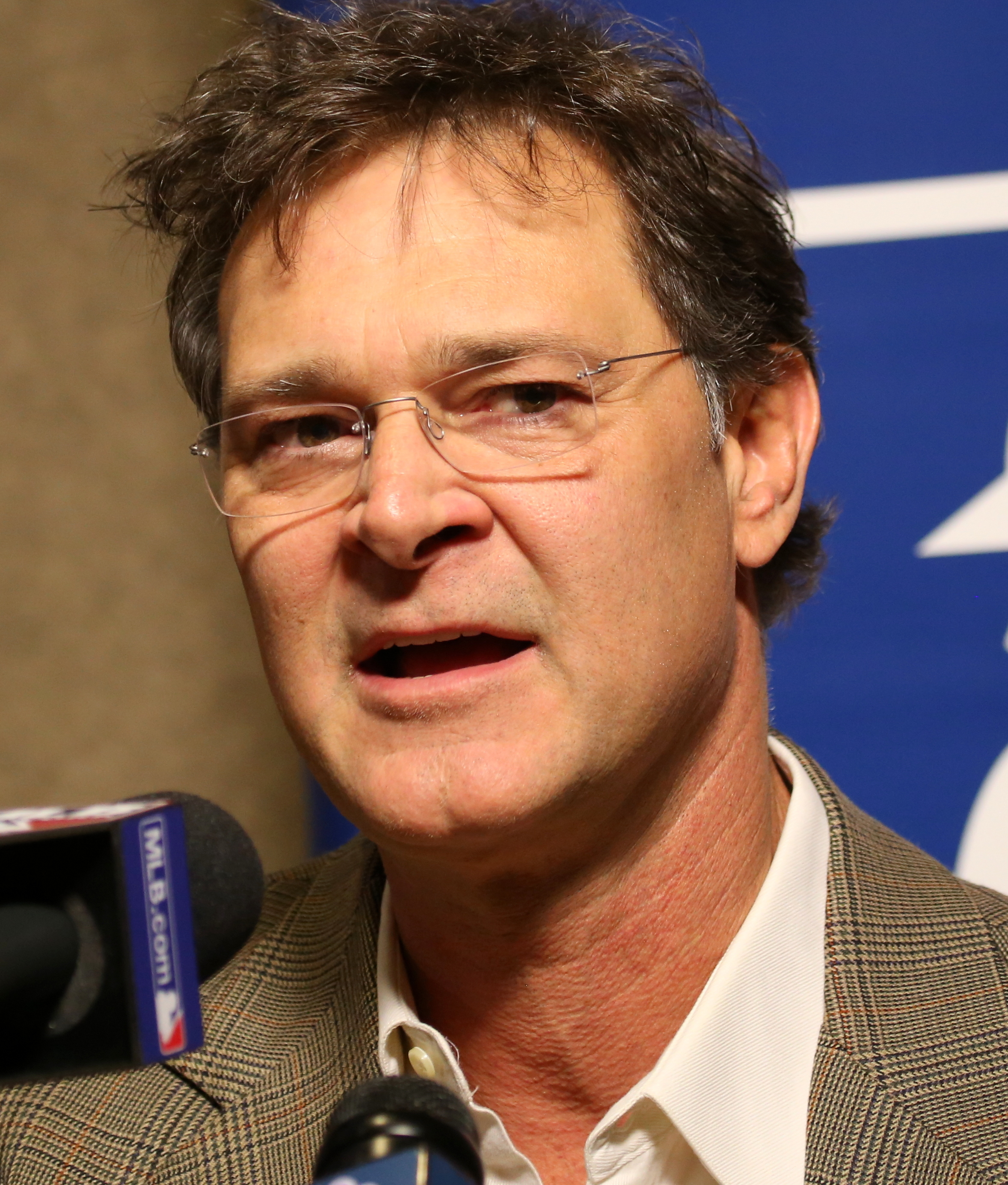
- Mattingly in 2015

Philadelphia Phillies – No. 8
- First baseman / Manager / Coach
- Born: April 20, 1961 (age 65); Evansville, Indiana, U.S.
- Batted: Left Threw: Left

MLB debut
- September 8, 1982, for the New York Yankees

Last MLB appearance
- October 1, 1995, for the New York Yankees

MLB statistics (through 2026 season)
- Batting average: .307
- Hits: 2,153
- Home runs: 222
- Runs batted in: 1,099
- Managerial record: 968–1,005
- Winning %: .491
- Stats at Baseball Reference
- Managerial record at Baseball Reference

Teams
- As player: New York Yankees (1982–1995); As manager: Los Angeles Dodgers (2011–2015); Miami Marlins (2016–2022); Philadelphia Phillies (2026–present); As coach: New York Yankees (2004–2007); Los Angeles Dodgers (2008–2010); Toronto Blue Jays (2023–2025); Philadelphia Phillies (2026)

Career highlights and awards
- 6× All-Star (1984–1989); AL MVP (1985); 9× Gold Glove Award (1985–1989, 1991–1994); 3× Silver Slugger Award (1985–1987); AL batting champion (1984); AL RBI leader (1985); NL Manager of the Year (2020); New York Yankees No. 23 retired; Monument Park honoree

Donald Arthur Mattingly (born April 20, 1961), nicknamed "Donnie Baseball" and "the Hit Man", is an American former first baseman, manager and coach who serves as manager for the Philadelphia Phillies of Major League Baseball (MLB). He spent his entire playing career in MLB with the New York Yankees from 1982 to 1995. A six-time All-Star, he led the American League (AL) in doubles three consecutive years, and in hits and total bases twice each. After winning the AL batting title with a .343 mark in his first full season in 1984, he was named the league's Most Valuable Player (MVP) in 1985 after hitting .324 with 145 runs batted in (RBI), the highest total in the league in over 30 years. The following year, he was runner-up for the MVP award after batting .352, leading the AL in hits, doubles, slugging percentage and total bases; his 53 doubles and 388 total bases were the highest totals by any major league player in the 1980s, and his totals of doubles and 238 hits remain Yankees franchise records. In 1987 he tied a major league record by hitting home runs in eight consecutive games, and later that year set another record by hitting six grand slams in one season.

Congenital back problems, which forced him to miss part of the 1990 season, also contributed to a decline in Mattingly's power hitting, but after being named the team's captain in 1991, he enjoyed a resurgence in productivity, leading the Yankees in RBI, hits, doubles, runs scored and batting average in 1992. Long frustrated by the team's failure to reach the postseason despite having the best record of any major league team during the 1980s, he helped lead the team to first place in 1994, batting .304, only to have the playoffs cancelled due to a work stoppage. He finally reached the postseason in his final season in 1995, but New York lost the Division Series in five games although Mattingly batted .417 with a home run and four doubles, driving in go-ahead runs in three games. His veteran leadership and influence on a core of young players has been credited for helping propel the club to four World Series titles in the next five years.

Regarded as one of the greatest defensive first basemen in history, Mattingly won a league-record nine Gold Glove Awards, leading the AL in fielding percentage seven times, also a league record; he retired with the highest career fielding percentage (.996) in league history, since broken by Mark Teixeira. His 1,634 games at first base then ranked tenth in AL history, his 1,104 assists ranked ninth, and his 1,500 double plays were tied for fifth; his 14,148 putouts were the fifth most in the AL since 1940. After batting over .300 seven times, Mattingly retired with a career average of .307, then the sixth highest among major league players with at least 5,000 at bats since 1960. The Yankees retired his uniform number (23) in 1997, making him the only Yankee to have his number retired without having won a World Series with the team.

Returning to the Yankees as a coach in 2004 under manager Joe Torre, Mattingly followed Torre to the Los Angeles Dodgers in 2008, and later succeeded him for five seasons, winning three division titles. He then became manager of the Miami Marlins for seven years, and was named the National League (NL) Manager of the Year in 2020 after guiding the team to its first playoff appearance in 17 years; he joined Frank Robinson and Torre to become the third person to win an MVP Award, a Gold Glove and Manager of the Year. He served as bench coach for the Toronto Blue Jays from 2023 to 2025.

== Early life ==
Donald Arthur Mattingly was born on April 20, 1961, in Evansville, Indiana. Although naturally left-handed, he displayed ambidextrous ability. He pitched in Little League Baseball as well as playing first base, throwing both right-handed and left-handed, and was a member of the 1973 Great Scot Little League championship team in Evansville, under the coaching of Pete Studer and Earl Hobbs. In American Legion Baseball for Funkhouser Post #8, Mattingly played at second base, throwing right-handed.

Playing for Reitz Memorial High School's baseball team, the Tigers, Mattingly led the school to a state-record 59 straight victories through the 1978–79 season, losing to the Logansport Berries. The Tigers won the state championship in 1978 and finished as the runner-up in 1979. Mattingly was the L.V. Phillips Mental Attitude recipient in 1979. He was All-City, All-Southern Indiana Athletic Conference (SIAC), and All-State in 1978 and 1979. During the four years he played in high school, Mattingly batted .463, leading the Tigers to a 94–9–1 win–loss record. He still holds Reitz Memorial records for hits (152), doubles (29), triples (25), RBI (140), and runs (99). His 25 triples are also an Indiana state record. A multisport athlete (basketball, football and baseball), Mattingly was selected to the SIAC all-conference basketball team in 1978.

After graduating from high school, Mattingly was offered a scholarship to play baseball for the Indiana State Sycamores, which he ultimately rejected to play professional baseball.

== Professional career ==
=== Draft and minor leagues ===
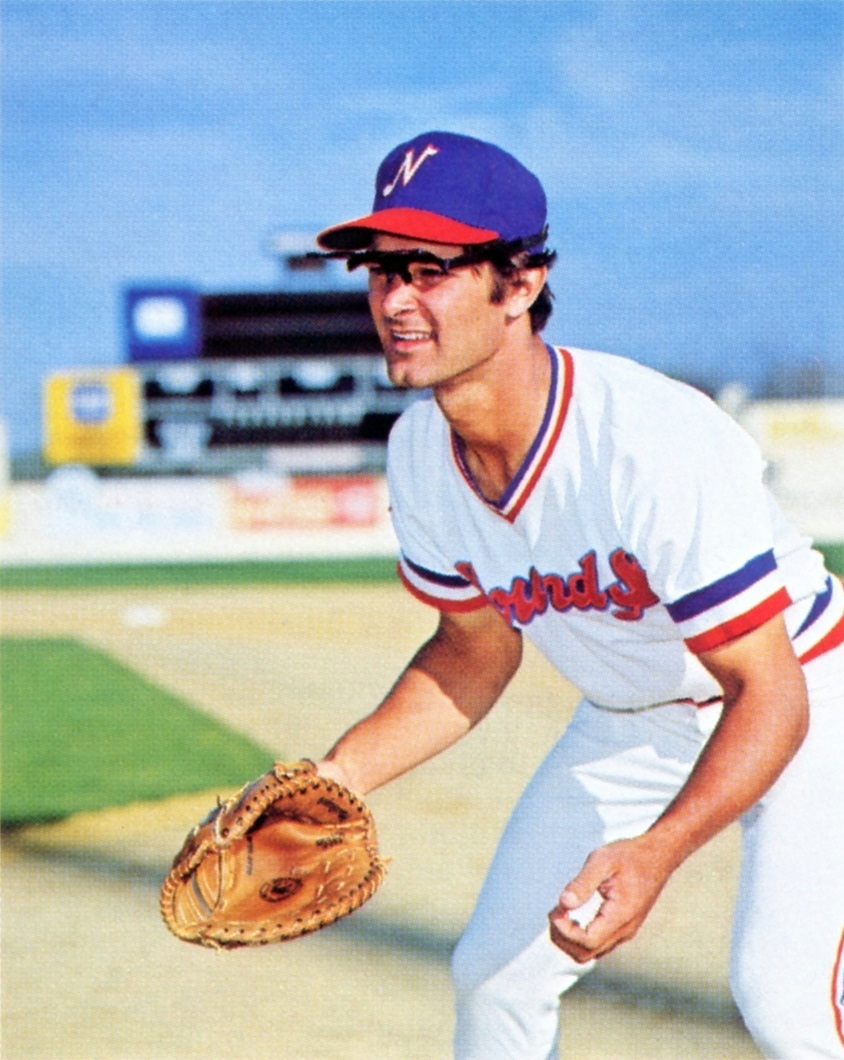
Mattingly with the Nashville Sounds in 1981

Mattingly lasted in the 1979 Major League Baseball draft until the 19th round, when he was selected by the New York Yankees. His father, Bill, informed major league teams that his son intended to honor his college commitment and would not sign a professional contract. Don Mattingly was not interested in attending college, so he chose to sign with the Yankees, receiving a $23,000 signing bonus.

Mattingly began his professional career in Minor League Baseball with the Oneonta Yankees of the Low-A New York–Penn League in 1979. He hoped to bat .500 for Oneonta and was disappointed with his .349 batting average, which never went lower than .340. He batted a league-leading .358 in 1980 for the Greensboro Hornets of the Single-A South Atlantic League in addition to recording a league-best 177 hits. He won the league MVP award and was named to the postseason All-Star team. With the Double-A Nashville Sounds in 1981, he hit .316 and led the Southern League with 35 doubles. He was selected to play in the Southern League All-Star Game and named to its postseason All-Star team.

Despite Mattingly's hitting ability, concerns existed about his lack of speed and power. Bob Schaefer, his manager at Greensboro, said that the organization considered moving him to second base, from which he would throw right-handed. Mattingly was batting .325 for the Columbus Clippers of the Triple-A International League when he made it to the majors as a September call-up in late 1982. He was named to the league's postseason All-Star team and finished third in the voting for the International League MVP Award.

=== New York Yankees (1982–1995) ===
Mattingly made his major league debut on September 8, 1982, as a late-inning defensive replacement against the Baltimore Orioles. He recorded his first at bat on September 11 against the Milwaukee Brewers, popping out to third base in the seventh inning. He made his first career major league hit in the bottom of the 11th inning of a 3–2, 12-inning loss to the Boston Red Sox on October 1, a single to right field off Steve Crawford. He had only two hits in 12 at-bats that season.

Mattingly spent his rookie season of 1983 as a part-time first baseman and outfielder. After four games in April, he was sent back to Columbus for two months before returning, and hit .283 in 279 at-bats. He hit his first home run on June 24 against John Tudor in a 5–4 road loss to the Red Sox.

Mattingly became the Yankees' full-time first baseman in 1984. With a batting average of .339, he was selected as a reserve for the 1984 All-Star Game. Heading into the final game of the season, Mattingly and teammate Dave Winfield were competing for the American League batting title, with Mattingly trailing Winfield by .002. On the final day of the season, Mattingly went 4-for-5, while Winfield batted 1-for-4. Mattingly won the batting title with a .343 average, while Winfield finished second with a .340 average. Mattingly also led the league with 207 hits. He hit a league-leading 44 doubles to go with 23 home runs. He was second in the league in slugging percentage (.537) and at bats per strikeout (18.3), fourth in total bases (324), fifth in RBI (110), sixth in sacrifice flies (9), and tenth in on-base percentage (.381).

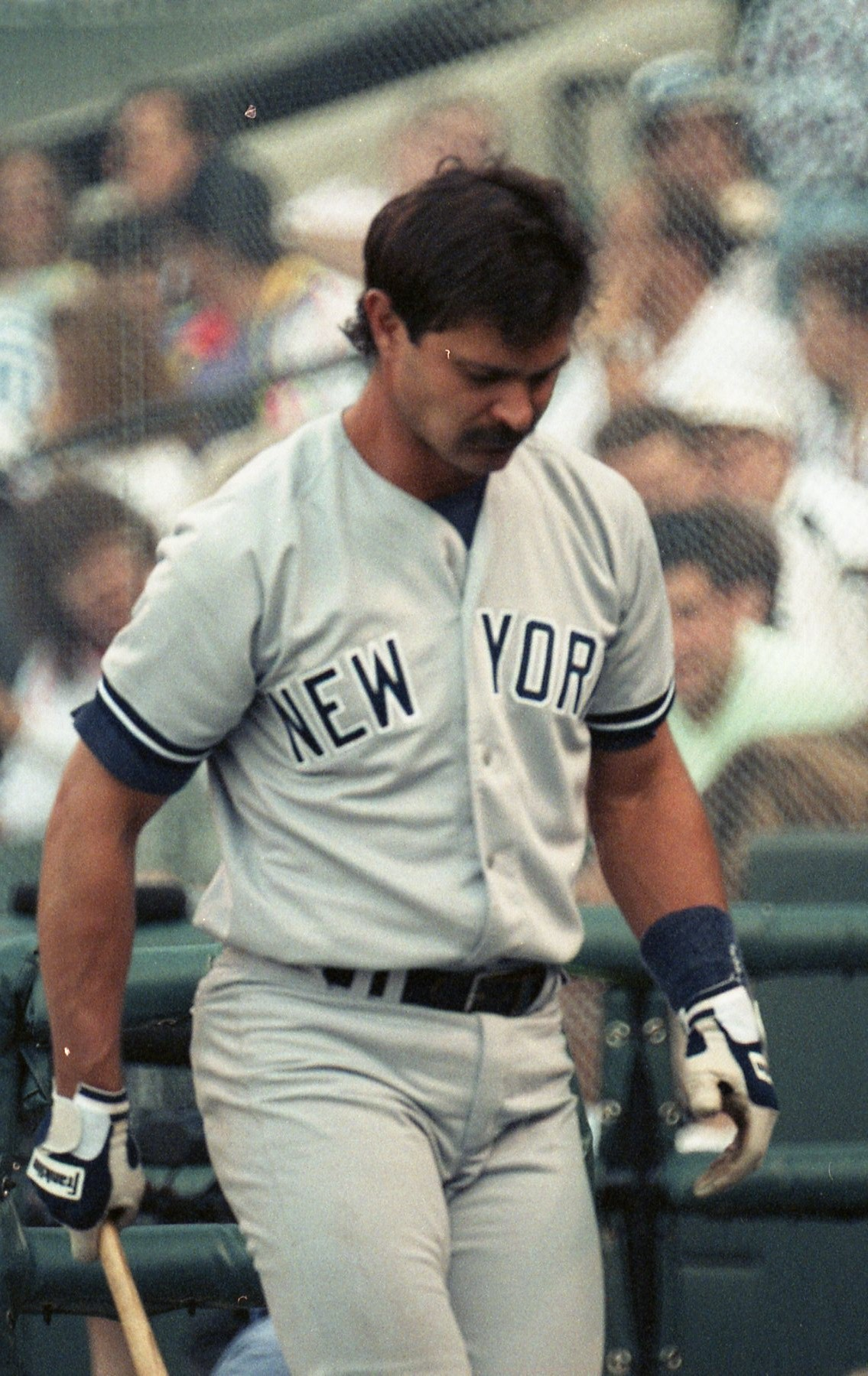
Mattingly with the Yankees

Mattingly followed up his breakout season with a spectacular 1985, winning the AL MVP Award. He batted .324 (third in the league) with 35 home runs (fourth), 48 doubles (first), and 145 RBI (first), then the most RBI in a season by a left-handed major league batter since Ted Williams drove in 159 in 1949. His 21-RBI margin over second place in that category was the largest in the American League since Al Rosen's lead of 30 RBI in 1953. He led the league in sacrifice flies (15), total bases (370), and extra base hits (86), and was second in the AL in hits (211) and slugging percentage (.567), third in intentional walks (13) and at bats per strikeout (13.9), sixth in runs (107), and ninth in at bats per home run (18.6). He batted .354 with two out and runners in scoring position.

Mattingly was also recognized in 1985 for his defense, winning his first of nine Gold Glove Awards. He was considered such an asset defensively that Yankees management assigned him to play games at second base and third base early in his career, though he was a left-handed thrower. Mattingly appeared as a left-handed throwing second baseman during the resumption of the George Brett "Pine Tar Incident" game on August 18, 1983, shifting from first base in the ninth inning for one batter, who struck out. He also played three games at third base during a five-game road series against the Seattle Mariners in late August 1986, including one complete game, and recorded 11 assists with one error while throwing left-handed.

Mattingly had a better year in 1986, leading the league with 238 hits and 53 doubles, and breaking the single-season franchise records set by Earle Combs (231 hits) and Lou Gehrig (52 doubles); both records had been set on the legendary 1927 team. He also recorded 388 total bases and a .573 slugging percentage, and had the league's longest hitting streak of the season, making hits in 24 consecutive games, from a 3–0 win over the Seattle Mariners in the second game of a doubleheader on August 30 through a 3–2 loss to the Detroit Tigers on September 26. He batted .352 (second in the league), hit 31 home runs (sixth) and drove in 113 runs (third). He was beaten in the American League MVP voting, though, by pitcher Roger Clemens, who also won the Cy Young Award that year. Mattingly also became the last left-handed player to field a ball at third base during a major league game.

In 1987, Mattingly tied Dale Long's major league record by hitting home runs in eight consecutive games, from July 8–18 (the All-Star game occurred in the middle of the streak; Mattingly, starting at first base, was 0 for 3). This record was later tied again by Ken Griffey Jr., of the Mariners in 1993. Mattingly also set a record by recording an extra base hit in 10 consecutive games. Mattingly had a record 10 home runs during this streak (Long and Griffey had eight during their streaks), including a 12–3 road win over the Texas Rangers on July 16 in which he had two home runs including a grand slam and a career-high seven RBI. That year, Mattingly set a major league record by hitting six grand slams in a season (two during his July home run streak), a record matched by Travis Hafner during the 2006 season. Mattingly's grand slams in 1987 were ironically the only grand slams of his career.

MLB-record six Grand Slams in one season 1
#	Date	Against	Pitcher	Venue	Score
1	May 14	Texas Rangers	Mike Mason	Yankee Stadium	9–1 W
2	Jun 29	Toronto Blue Jays	John Cerutti	Exhibition Stadium	15–14 W
3	Jul 10	Chicago White Sox	Joel McKeon	Yankee Stadium	9–5 W
4	Jul 16	Texas Rangers	Charlie Hough	Arlington Stadium	12–3 W
5	Sep 25	Baltimore Orioles	José Mesa	Memorial Stadium	8–4 W
6	Sep 29	Boston Red Sox	Bruce Hurst	Yankee Stadium	6–0 W

In June 1987, Mattingly reportedly injured his back during some clubhouse horseplay with pitcher Bob Shirley, though both denied this. Nevertheless, he finished with a .327 batting average, 30 home runs, and 115 RBI, his fourth straight year with at least 110 RBIs. Between 1985 and 1987, Mattingly hit 96 home runs with just 114 strikeouts.

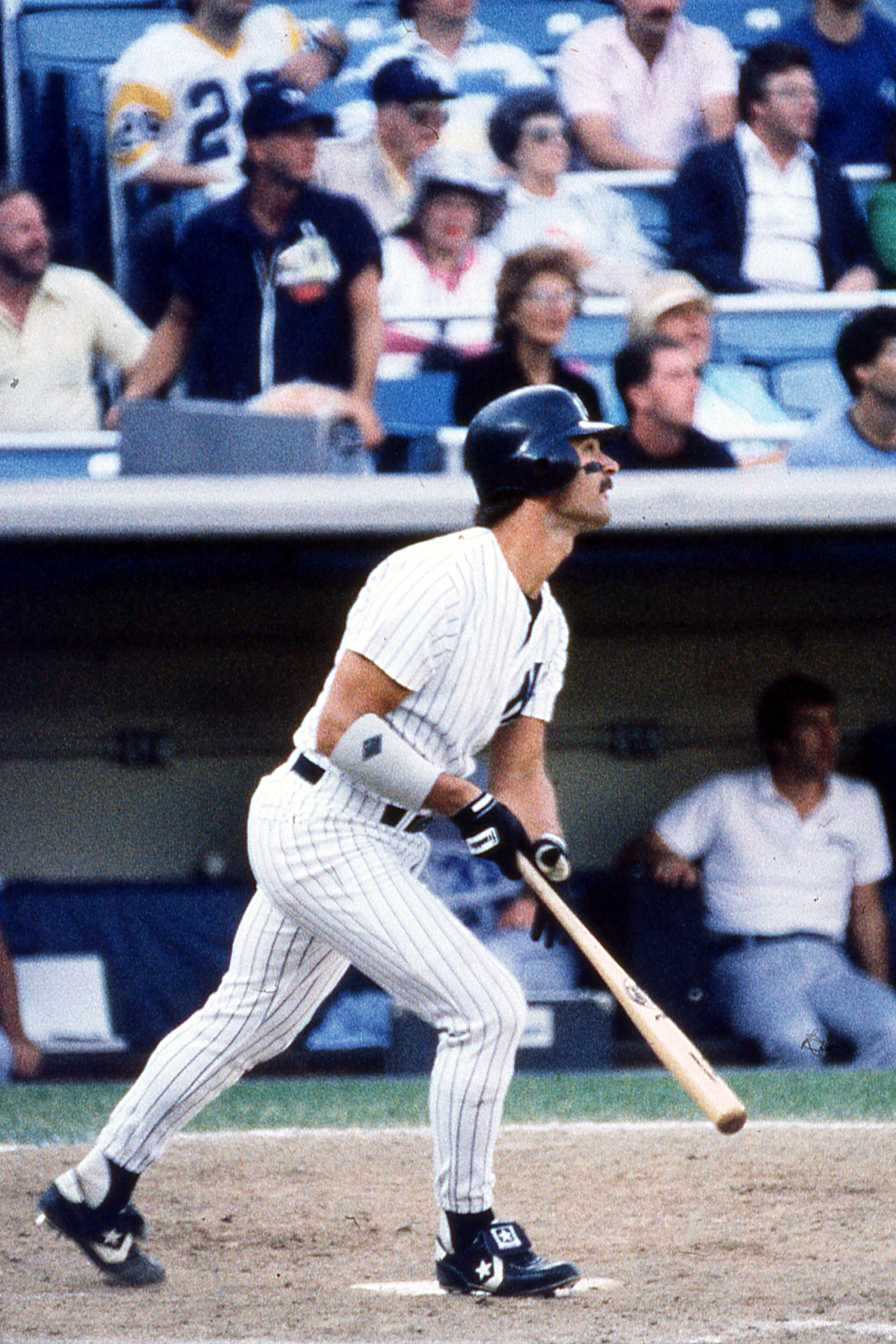
Mattingly playing for the New York Yankees at Yankee Stadium on August 19, 1988

Mattingly hit 18 home runs and recorded 88 RBI in 1988, but still was in the top 10 in the league in batting average with a .311 mark, and scored a career-high five runs in a 15–3 win over the Texas Rangers on April 30. He rebounded in 1989 to 113 RBI, but his average dipped to .303. Mattingly's five runs in the win over Texas marked the 12th time it has been done by a Yankee.

Mattingly's back problems flared up anew in 1990; after struggling with the bat, he had to go on the disabled list in July, only returning late in the season for an ineffective finish. His statistics line—a .256 average, five home runs, and 42 RBI in almost 400 at bats—came as a shock. Mattingly underwent extensive therapy in the offseason, but his hitting ability was never quite the same. Though he averaged .290 over his final five seasons, he became more of a slap hitter, hitting just 53 home runs over that time. His defense remained stellar, but he was not always physically able to play, especially on defense, and from 1989 to 1992 was sometimes used as a designated hitter. He did see a brief resurgence in power in 1993, hitting 17 home runs and driving in 86 runs in 134 games, as the Yankees finished second in the division behind the Toronto Blue Jays. On July 22, 1993, he hit his 200th home run, a 3-run blast in the seventh inning of a 12–1 win over the California Angels. In the strike-shortened 1994 season, he posted a .304 average, the first time since 1989 that he hit over .300. On April 7, 1994, he passed 1,000 RBI, driving in two runs in an 18–6 mauling of the Rangers, and on July 23 he made his 2,000th career hit, a seventh-inning single in a 7–2 road win over the Angels.

Mattingly made his major league debut in 1982, the year after the Yankees lost the World Series. The team did not reach the postseason in any of Mattingly's first 13 years, although they had the best record in the American League in 1994 when the players' strike ended the season prematurely.

In 1995, Mattingly finally reached the playoffs when the Yankees clinched the AL wild card on the last day of the season with a 6–1 road win over Toronto, including his last regular-season home run in the fifth inning. Facing the Seattle Mariners in the AL Division Series, the only postseason series of his career, Mattingly batted .417 with six RBI and a memorable go-ahead home run in Game 2, his final game at Yankee Stadium. In the final game of the series (and of his career), Mattingly again broke a tie with a two-run double, but the New York bullpen faltered, and Seattle won in the 11th inning of the decisive Game 5.

The Yankees acquired Tino Martinez to succeed Mattingly after the 1995 season. Unsigned for the 1996 season, Mattingly decided to sit out for the year, and rebuffed an inquiry by the Baltimore Orioles, which tried to sign him at midseason. Mattingly officially announced his retirement in January 1997.

For his career, Mattingly never appeared in the World Series, and his tenure with the Yankees marks the team's longest drought (14 years), later tied (2010–2023) without a World Series appearance. The Yankees made the series in both 1981 (the year prior to Mattingly's debut) and their 1996 championship season (the year after his last with the club).

== Coaching career ==
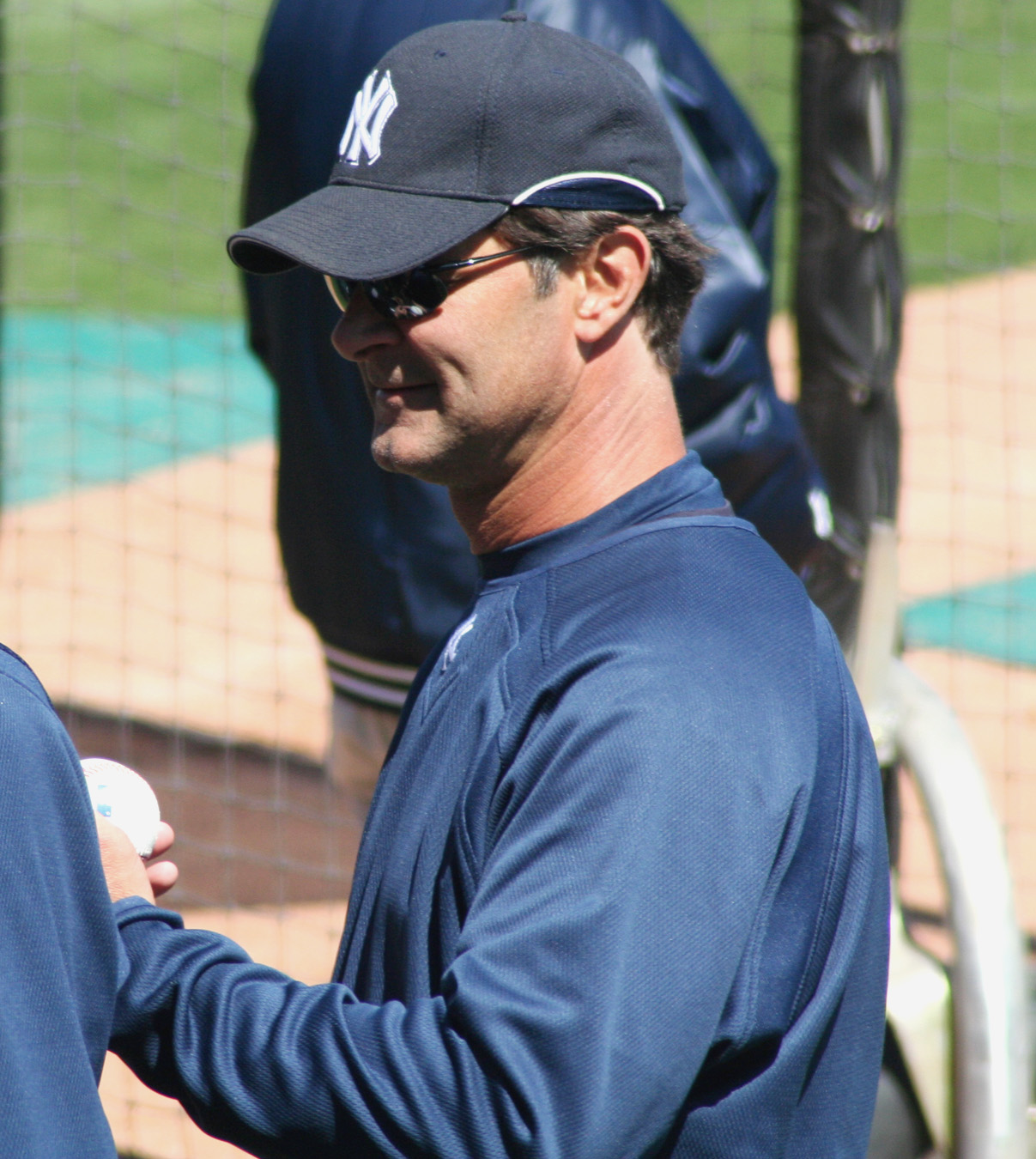
Mattingly as hitting coach with the New York Yankees

=== New York Yankees (2004–2007) ===
After retiring as a player, Mattingly spent seven seasons as a special instructor during Yankees' spring training in Tampa, Florida, from 1997 through 2003. Following the 2003 season, the Yankees named Mattingly the hitting coach. He spent three seasons in that role, receiving much praise from the Yankees organization and his players. Under Mattingly, the Yankees set an all-time franchise record with 242 home runs in 2004. After the 2006 season, Mattingly shifted to bench coach, replacing Lee Mazzilli.

After the 2007 season, when Joe Torre declined a one-year contract extension, Mattingly was a finalist for the Yankees' manager position, along with Joe Girardi and Tony Peña. The Yankees offered the managerial position to Girardi, who accepted.

=== Los Angeles Dodgers (2008–2010) ===
After not being offered the position of manager for the Yankees, Mattingly joined Torre with the Los Angeles Dodgers as the team's hitting coach. On January 22, 2008, Mattingly was replaced as hitting coach, citing family reasons, instead serving as major league special assignment coach for the Dodgers in 2008. Mattingly succeeded Mike Easler as the Dodgers hitting coach that July. The Dodgers were the National League runners-up in 2008 and 2009 (losing to the Philadelphia Phillies in both National League Championship Series), largely behind the bat of midseason acquisition Manny Ramirez.

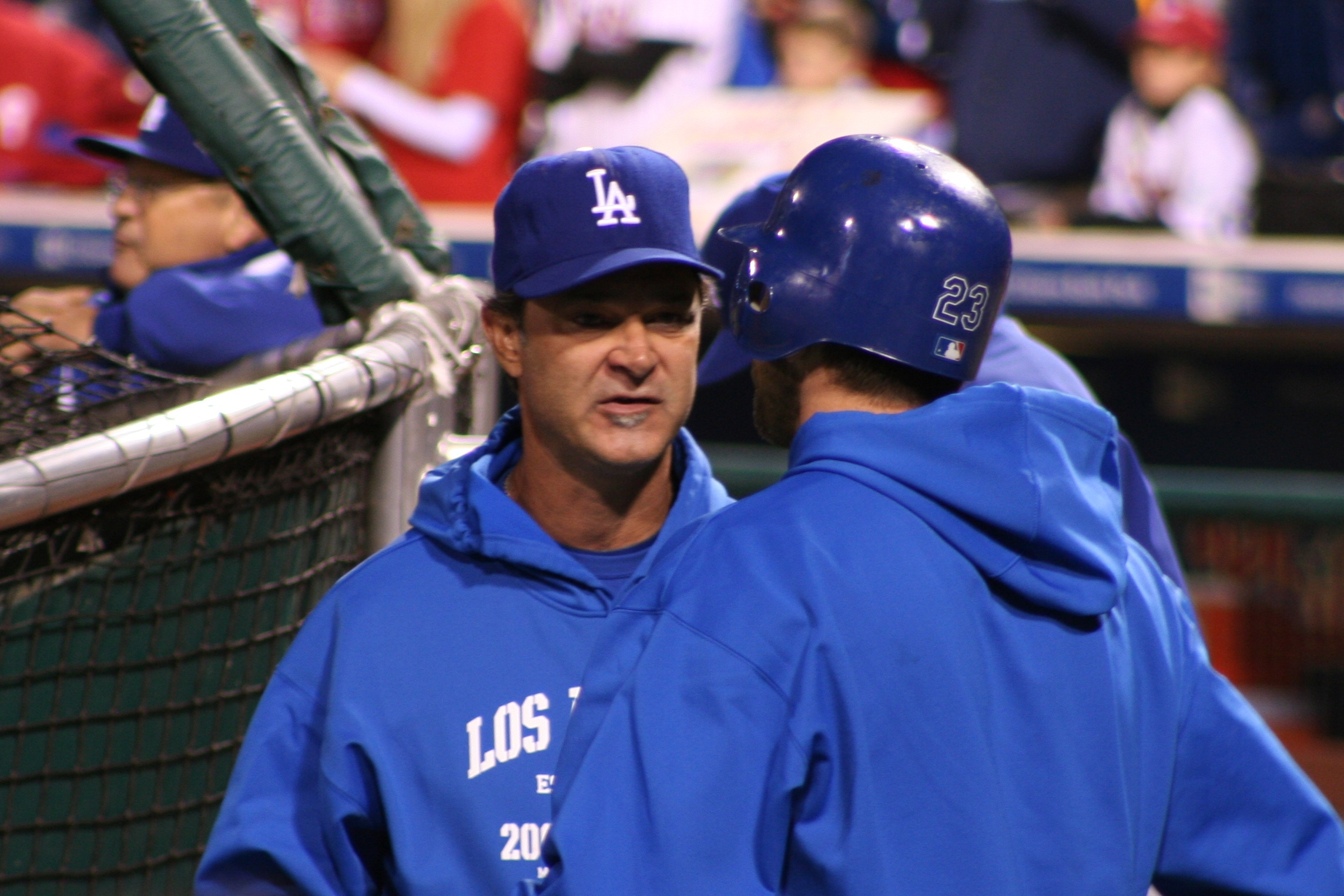
Mattingly with the Dodgers

In the 2009–10 offseason, Mattingly was a finalist for the managerial position with the Cleveland Indians, for which Manny Acta was eventually hired.

=== Toronto Blue Jays (2023–2025) ===
On November 30, 2022, the Toronto Blue Jays announced that Mattingly would join the team as its bench coach. Ahead of the 2024 season, Mattingly was given the additional title of offensive coordinator, overseeing the team's hitting coaches and video coordinator.

Following the 2024 season, Mattingly's role was reverted to that of a traditional bench coach. Mattingly was on the coaching roster when the Blue Jays made a deep run in the postseason, defeating his former team, the Yankees, in four games in the 2025 American League Division Series, and then winning the 2025 American League Championship Series over the Mariners in seven games to reach the World Series, which was Mattingly's first World Series appearance after over 40 years of playing/managing/coaching. In the 2025 World Series, Mattingly's team lost in seven games to the Dodgers who were managed by Dave Roberts, whom the Dodgers hired after parting ways with Mattingly in 2015. The Dodgers' Clayton Kershaw was one of the few players remaining from when Mattingly managed that team.

After the World Series loss, Mattingly stepped down from his role with the Blue Jays on November 6, 2025.

=== Philadelphia Phillies (2026–present) ===
On January 5, 2026, Mattingly was hired to serve as the bench coach for the Philadelphia Phillies under manager Rob Thomson. On April 28, 2026, as the Phillies began the day tied for last place in the majors following losses in 11 of their last 12 games, Thomson was fired and Mattingly was named interim manager through the end of the season. Mattingly was selected to the coaching staff at the MLB All-Star Game by National League manager Dave Roberts, Mattingly's third All-Star coaching assignment (2015 and 2017). On October 14, Mattingly was named as the team's full-time manager and signed a two-year contract.

== Managerial career ==
=== Los Angeles Dodgers (2010–2015) ===
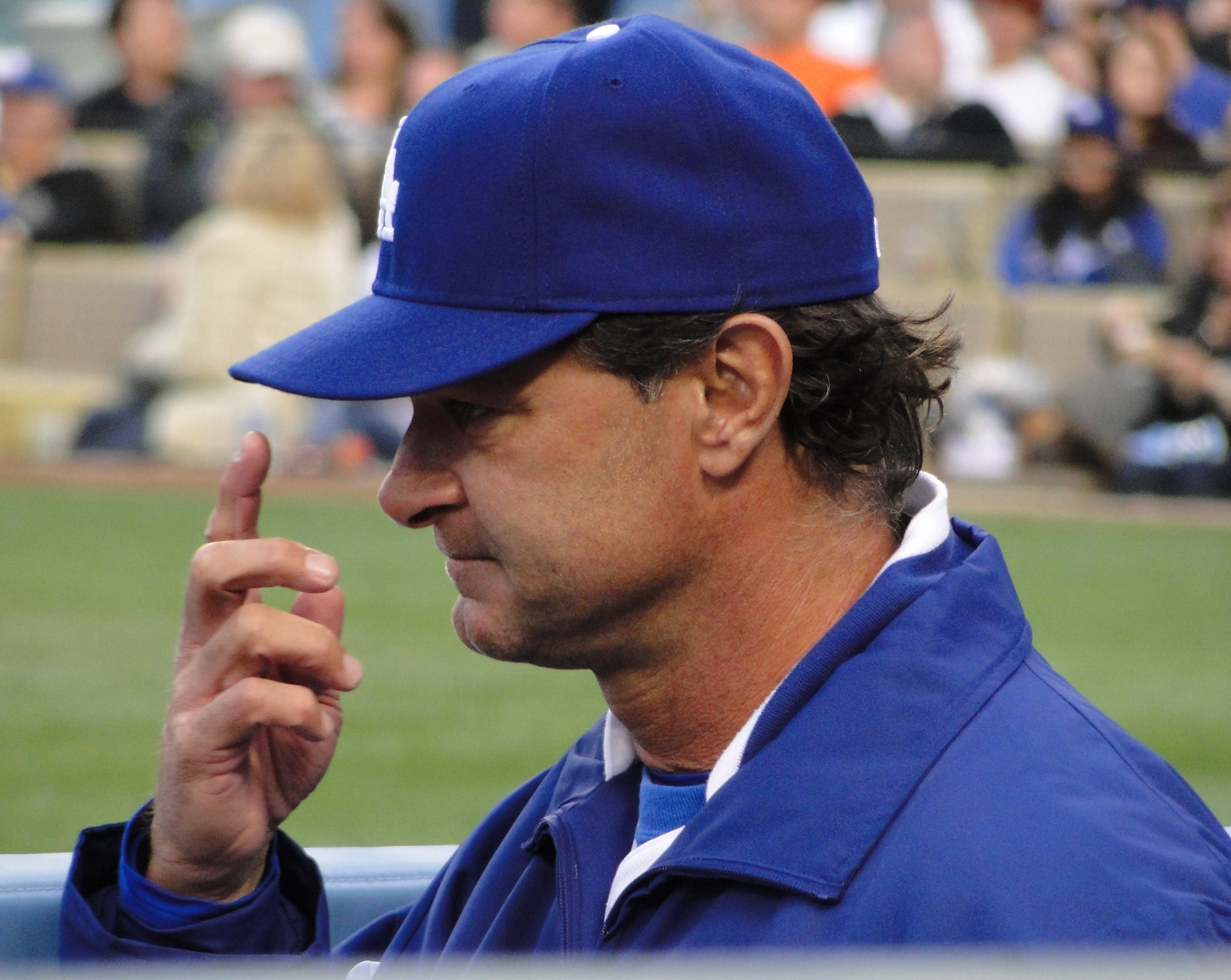
Mattingly with the Dodgers in 2011

When Torre decided to retire at the end of the 2010 season, Mattingly was announced as his replacement. To acquire some managerial experience, Mattingly managed the Phoenix Desert Dogs of the Arizona Fall League in 2010.

Mattingly made his managerial debut on March 31, 2011, by defeating in-state rival and defending champion San Francisco Giants 2–1 at Dodger Stadium. Despite the background of a bitter divorce battle between Dodgers' owner Frank McCourt and his wife, Jamie McCourt, that put the fiscal health of the Dodgers into jeopardy, Mattingly managed to take the Dodgers to a winning record that season due to his mentorship of many young players such as MVP candidate Matt Kemp and Cy Young Award winner Clayton Kershaw:

"He's so positive", Kershaw said. "All he asks of us is just go out there and play the way we're supposed to. Do things the right way on the field, and he's happy with you. When it's simple like that, it's easy to play for, and it's fun to play for."

In 2013, Mattingly and the Dodgers got off to a rough start due to various injuries, and were in last place in May, leading to much media speculation that he would soon be fired. Once players got healthy, though, the team went on a tear and managed to win the NL West and beat the Atlanta Braves in the 2013 National League Division Series (NLDS) in four games. They then lost to the St. Louis Cardinals in the NLCS in six games. After the season, Mattingly called out Dodger management for its perceived lack of support of him during the season and said that he wanted a multiyear contract in place to return in 2014. Mattingly finished second in the voting for National League Manager of the Year.

Mattingly stated that one of his managerial idols was Tony La Russa. Mattingly admired La Russa from his playing days with the Yankees in the late 1980s. LaRussa had managed the dominant Oakland Athletics teams of the era. Mattingly recalled that despite the A's superiority to the Yankees, they still played intensely.

On January 7, 2014, Mattingly and the Dodgers agreed on a three-year contract extension for him to remain as manager of the Dodgers. In the subsequent two seasons, the Dodgers won the NL West but lost the NLDS both years; in four games to the Cardinals in 2014, and in five games to the New York Mets in 2015.

On October 22, 2015, the Dodgers and Mattingly mutually agreed to part ways, and he stepped down from his position with one year left on his contract. Some have suggested that the Dodgers were not willing to give Mattingly a long-term contract. However, Mattingly said in 2025 that he left the Dodgers in hopes of spending more time with his family. His second wife Lori had to stay in Indiana due to her two sons from a previous marriage being in school, and long commutes to Los Angeles made it difficult to spend time with her and their infant son. He had a 446–363 record with the Dodgers, with a winning percentage of .551, which was second-best in Los Angeles Dodgers history. He finished with a postseason record of eight wins and 11 losses and was the first manager in franchise history to guide the team to three straight postseason appearances.

=== Miami Marlins (2016–2022) ===
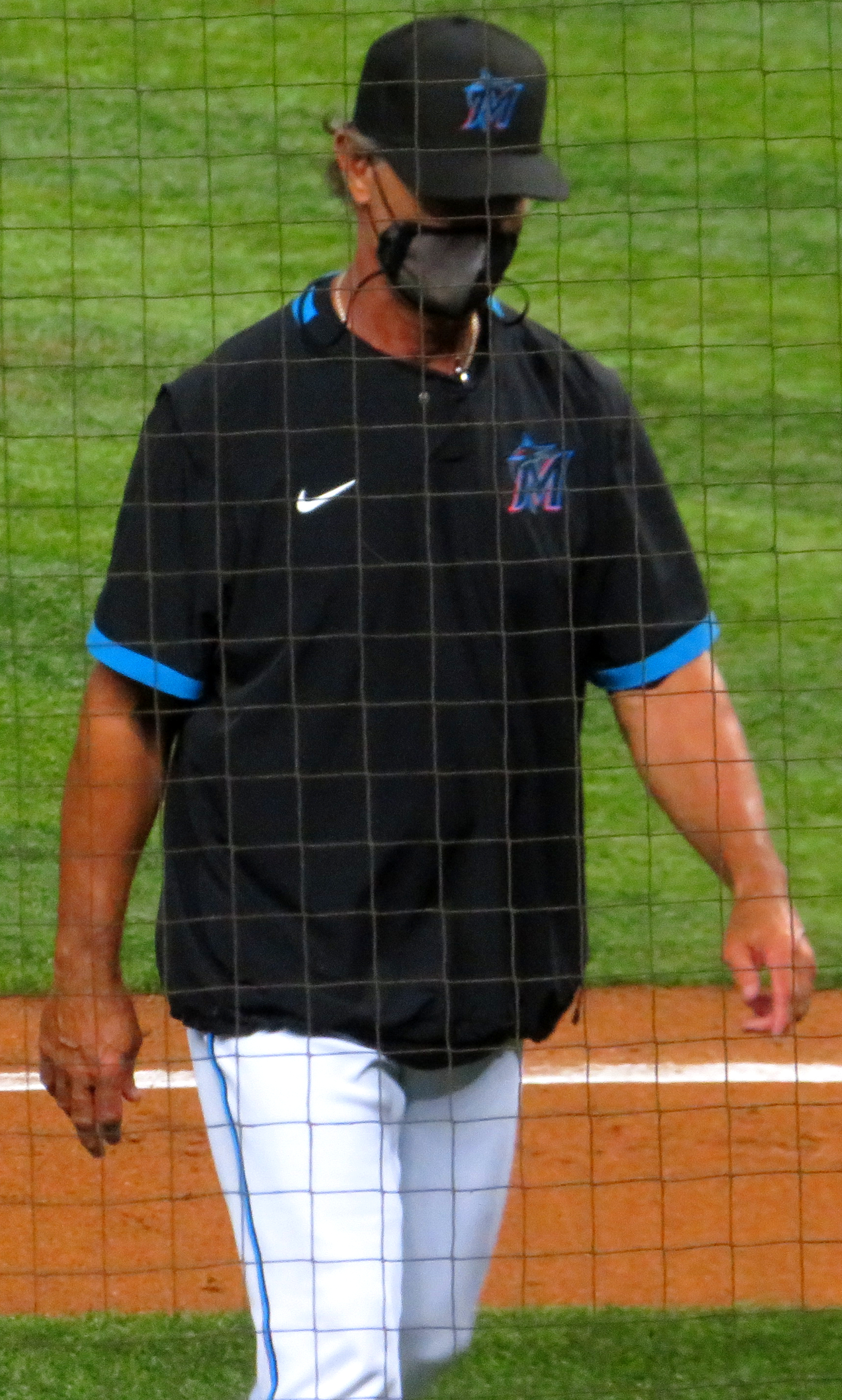
Mattingly with the Marlins in 2021

In the fall of 2015, Mattingly signed a four-year contract to manage the Miami Marlins. Mattingly led the Marlins to 79 wins in his first year (the most wins for the team since winning 80 in 2010), which had him place fifth in the final voting for NL Manager of the Year. In 2020, Mattingly led the Marlins to the NL Wild Card, leading them to the playoffs for the first time since 2003. He also won the NL Manager of the Year award. On July 8, 2021, Mattingly's mutual option for the 2022 season was picked up by both Mattingly and the Marlins. On September 25, 2022, Mattingly stated that both he and the Marlins had mutually agreed that he would finish the season as manager, and not return to the role in 2023.

=== Philadelphia Phillies (2026–present) ===
Mattingly officially joined the Philadelphia Phillies as bench coach on January 5, 2026. Following the dismissal of manager Rob Thomson on April 28, 2026, Mattingly was assigned to be the interim manager of the Philadelphia Phillies. The move came after a 9–19 start to the season. Following Mattingly's promotion to interim manager, the Philadelphia Phillies went on to win their next three games, sweeping the San Francisco Giants. In his first year as the Phillies manager he led them to a 79–55 record but they lost in three games to the Braves in the NL Wild Card. On October 14 he signed a two-year contract covering 2027 and 2028 seasons to be Phillies full time manager.

== International career ==
Mattingly managed the MLB All-Star Team at the 2018 MLB Japan All-Star Series.

== Managerial record ==
As of games played on October 1, 2026

Team	Year	Regular season					Postseason			
Team	Year	Games	Won	Lost	Win %	Finish	Won	Lost	Win %	Result
LAD	2011	161	82	79	.509	3rd in NL West	–	–	–	
LAD	2012	162	86	76	.531	2nd in NL West	–	–	–	
LAD	2013	162	92	70	.568	1st in NL West	5	5	.500	Lost NLCS (STL)
LAD	2014	162	94	68	.580	1st in NL West	1	3	.250	Lost NLDS (STL)
LAD	2015	162	92	70	.568	1st in NL West	2	3	.400	Lost NLDS (NYM)
LAD total		809	446	363	.551		8	11	.421	
MIA	2016	161	79	82	.491	3rd in NL East	–	–	–	
MIA	2017	162	77	85	.475	2nd in NL East	–	–	–	
MIA	2018	161	63	98	.391	5th in NL East	–	–	–	
MIA	2019	162	57	105	.352	5th in NL East	–	–	–	
MIA	2020	60	31	29	.517	2nd in NL East	2	3	.400	Lost NLDS (ATL)
MIA	2021	162	67	95	.414	4th in NL East	–	–	–	
MIA	2022	162	69	93	.426	4th in NL East	–	–	–	
MIA total		1,030	443	587	.430		2	3	.400	
PHI	2026	134	79	55	.590	2nd in NL East	1	2	.333	Lost NLWC (ATL)
PHI total		134	79	55	.590		1	2	.333	
Total		1,973	968	1,005	.491		11	16	.407	

== Legacy ==
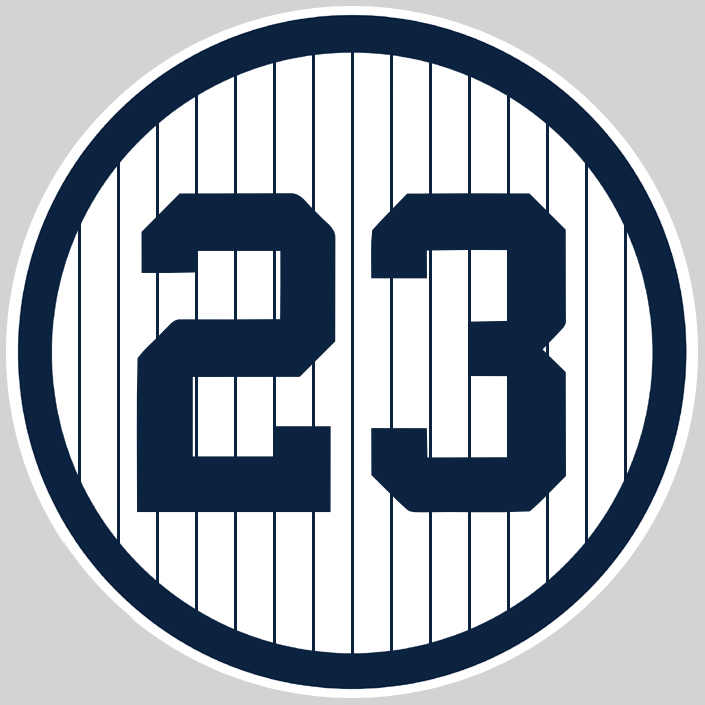
Don Mattingly's number 23 was retired by the New York Yankees in 1997.

Mattingly finished his career with 2,153 hits, 222 home runs, 1,007 runs scored, 1,099 RBIs, with three Silver Slugger Awards. His .307 lifetime batting average then placed him behind only Tony Gwynn (then at .336), Wade Boggs (then at .334), Rod Carew (.328), Kirby Puckett (.318) and Roberto Clemente (.317) among players with 5,000 at bats since the major league expansion era began in 1961. He is commonly cited as the best Yankee player to have never played in a World Series. His career had bad timing, as the Yankees lost the World Series the year before he broke into the big leagues and they ended up winning the World Series in the first year of Mattingly's retirement, not to mention the Yankees had the best record in the American League in 1994 before the strike. This World Series drought (1982–1995) was the longest in Yankees history since the start of the Babe Ruth era in 1920, and it was worsened by the strike, which ended a promising chance for a World Series title.

Buck Showalter, Mattingly's last manager during his playing days and a former teammate in the minor leagues, attributed Mattingly's calmness to the controversies he was subjected to as manager of the Dodgers to Mattingly's experience as a player having to deal with controversies during his time with the Yankees.

The Yankees retired Mattingly's number 23 and dedicated his plaque for Monument Park at Yankee Stadium on August 31, 1997. The plaque calls him, "A humble man of grace and dignity, a captain who led by example, proud of the pinstripe tradition and dedicated to the pursuit of excellence, a Yankee forever." Additionally, his uniform number with the Double-A Nashville Sounds (18) was retired by the team in a ceremony at Herschel Greer Stadium attended by Mattingly on August 12, 1999.

=== Hall of Fame consideration ===
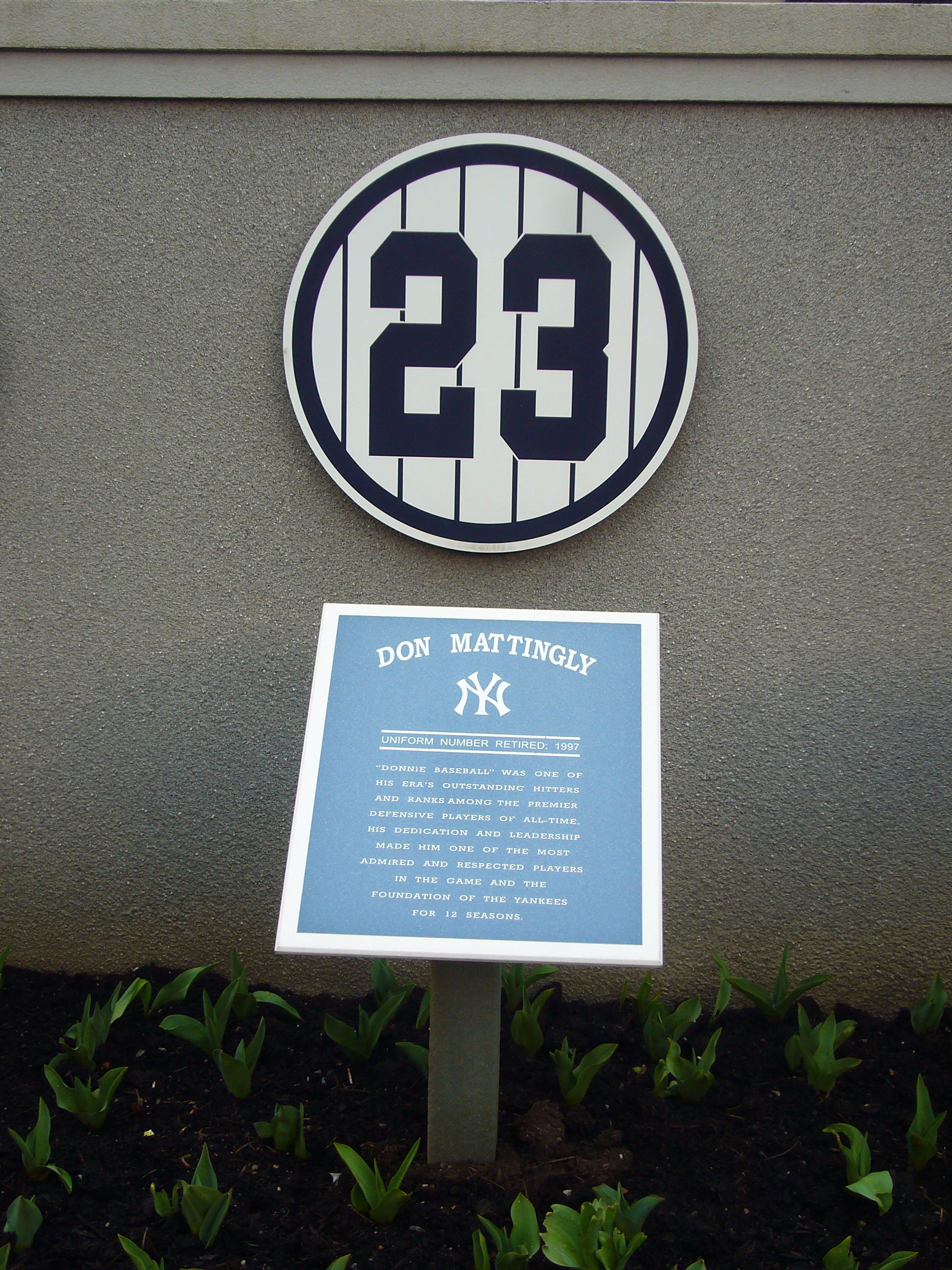
Mattingly's retired number in Monument Park at Yankee Stadium

Mattingly became eligible for election to the Baseball Hall of Fame in 2001, receiving 28.2% of the vote (election requires 75%); he dropped to 20% the following year, and generally received between 10% and 14% of the vote over the next decade, receiving only 9% in 2015, his final year of eligibility (he had been grandfathered onto the ballot after the Hall of Fame restricted eligibility to ten years in 2014). Since Mattingly's first year on the ballot, there has been controversy over the election that year of Kirby Puckett, who was also newly eligible and had likewise played his first full season in 1984, as their career statistics are very similar:

	G	AB	R	H	2B	3B	HR	RBI	BB	BA	OBP	SA
Don Mattingly	1785	7003	1007	2153	442	20	222	1099	588	.307	358	.471
Kirby Puckett	1783	7244	1071	2304	414	57	207	1085	450	.318	360	.477

Puckett's election has generally been attributed to the view that while Mattingly's strongest years were early in his career, Puckett's production was more consistent, and there was considerable sympathy over his career ending abruptly due to an eye injury. And yet there are other similarities other than career totals, as both players won one batting title and led the AL in RBI once and total bases twice; for each, their lowest batting average in a full season was .288, and both topped the .350 mark once. Mattingly finished in the top seven in MVP voting four times, and in the top twenty in three other years; Puckett finished in the top seven in seven years, but otherwise was never in the top twenty. Mattingly won more Gold Gloves (nine to six), and had more seasons with 30 home runs, 100 RBI, 40 doubles or 300 total bases, though Puckett was on more All-Star teams (ten to six). Another Hall of Famer with striking similarities to Mattingly is Bill Terry; both players were left-handed first basemen who spent their entire careers with New York teams on opposite sides of the Harlem River. Both played in all or part of 14 seasons (Terry played 10 full seasons, Mattingly 11), and each won one batting title:

	G	AB	R	H	2B	3B	HR	RBI	BB	BA	OBP	SA
Don Mattingly	1785	7003	1007	2153	442	20	222	1099	588	.307	358	.471
Bill Terry	1721	6428	1120	2193	373	112	154	1078	537	.341	393	.506

Terry's higher averages can be primarily attributed to the remarkably elevated averages in the National League in the late 1920s and early 1930s, which highly favored hitters; when he won the batting title in 1930, the league average was .303 (Mattingly won his title when the league average was .264), and the league average over Terry's career was .283, compared to .263 during Mattingly's career. Mattingly is the most statistically similar player to both Puckett and Terry. One more Hall of Famer who is something of a mirror image to Mattingly is George Kell, whose defensive skills were largely identical to Mattingly's – but the right-handed Kell was able to play as a third baseman, while the left-handed Mattingly was essentially limited to playing on the opposite side of the diamond:

	G	AB	R	H	2B	3B	HR	RBI	BB	BA	OBP	SA
Don Mattingly	1785	7003	1007	2153	442	20	222	1099	588	.307	358	.471
George Kell	1795	6702	880	2054	385	50	78	870	621	.306	367	.414

Mattingly is now eligible to be inducted into the Hall of Fame via the Contemporary Baseball Era Players Committee. He was included on the 2018, 2020, 2023 and 2026 ballots, but did not receive enough votes for induction, coming closest with 50% of the vote in 2023. He is eligible to be considered again for the 2029 class of inductees.

Mattingly has been honored by two minor league halls of fame. He was inducted in the South Atlantic League Hall of Fame in 1994 and the New York–Penn League Hall of Fame in 2015.

In 2001, Mattingly was inducted into the Indiana Baseball Hall of Fame; his plaque displays his high school and professional careers. In 1987, he was named the American Legion Graduate of the Year, for his success in the major leagues following his American Legion Baseball career.

== Personal life ==
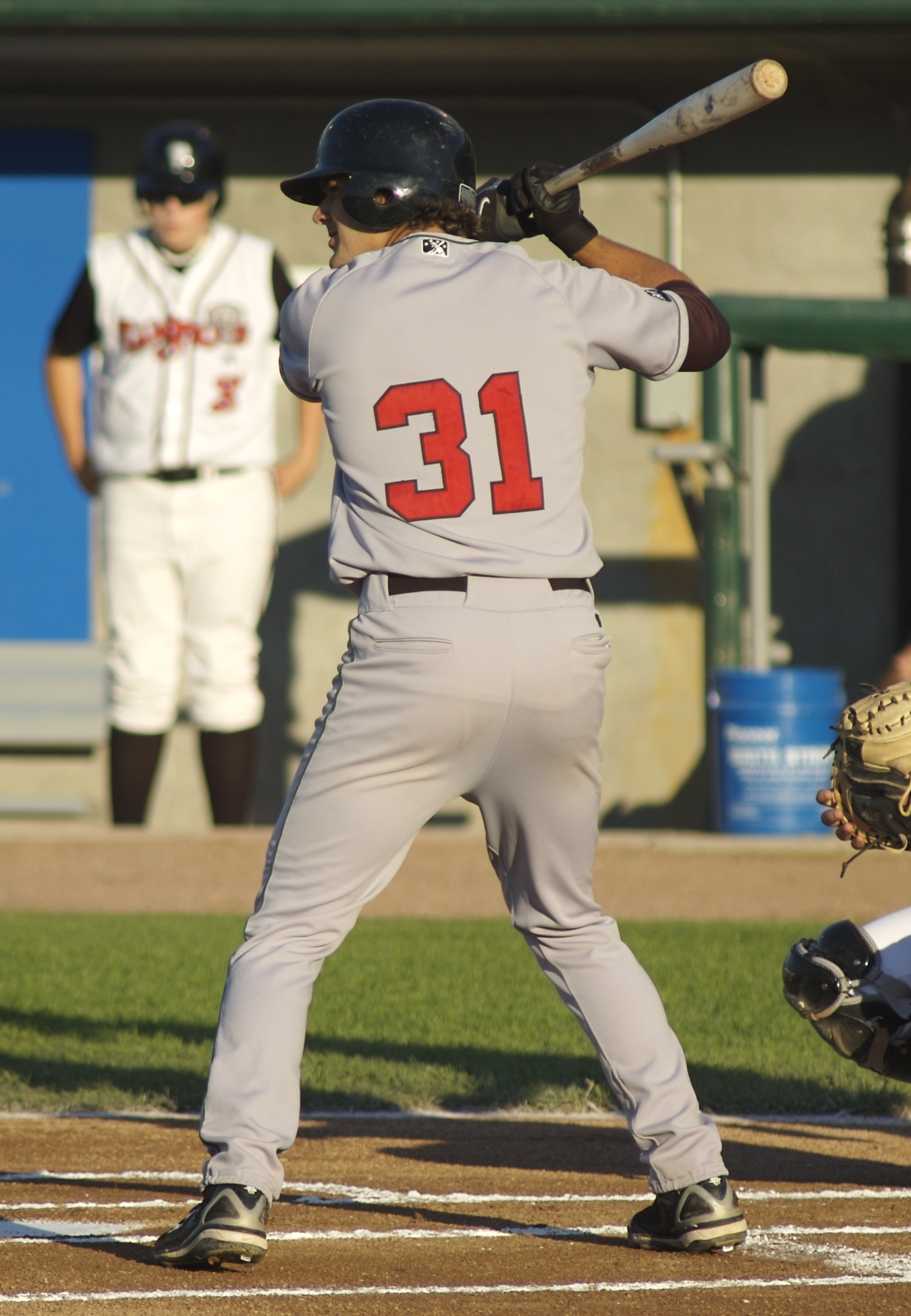
Preston Mattingly with the Single-A Great Lakes Loons

Mattingly married Kim Sexton on September 8, 1979; they divorced after his playing career ended. Mattingly and Kim share three sons: Taylor, Preston, and Jordon. Taylor was selected in the 42nd round (1,262nd overall) of the 2003 Major League Baseball draft by the Yankees, and played in 24 games for the Gulf Coast League Yankees in the rookie league before an injury cut short his season. After sitting out all of 2004 and 2005, Taylor retired from baseball in 2005 after only 58 professional at bats. Preston also played minor league baseball before becoming an executive. Preston became the general manager for the Philadelphia Phillies in 2025, working with his father Don as manager starting midway through 2026.

Mattingly married his second wife, Lori, on December 10, 2010, in his hometown of Evansville, Indiana. The wedding, and his managing the Phoenix Desert Dogs of the Arizona Fall League, prevented him from attending the 2010 winter meetings. In 2014, he and Lori had a son, Louis.

Mattingly's older brother, Randy Mattingly, played quarterback at the University of Evansville and was chosen by the Cleveland Browns in the fourth round of the 1973 NFL draft before playing in the Canadian Football League.

== Business ventures ==
During the late 1980s and early 1990s, Don Mattingly was the owner of a restaurant in Evansville, Indiana, called "Mattingly's 23", after the uniform number he wore for most of his career.

In 2005, Mattingly launched Mattingly Sports, a baseball and softball equipment company, based primarily around the patented V-Grip baseball and softball bats.

Mattingly is the founder of Mattingly Charities, a nonprofit organization that serves underprivileged youth by supporting programs that promote baseball and softball participation in conjunction with other developmentally related activities.

== In popular culture ==
Mattingly appeared in a baseball-themed episode of The Simpsons, "Homer at the Bat", which originally aired on February 20, 1992. In the episode, Mr. Burns, the owner of the Springfield Nuclear Power Plant and the manager of its softball team, repeatedly demands that Mattingly trim his sideburns, leading Mattingly to protest that he had no sideburns, and to eventually shave much of his head. Burns, irate, cuts him from the team for defying his orders. As he departs, the exasperated Mattingly says to himself, "I still like him better than Steinbrenner." In 1991, before the episode aired, but after it was produced, then-Yankees manager Stump Merrill told him that until he cut his hair, he would not play. This was in accord with Yankee owner George Steinbrenner's appearance policy requiring his players to maintain well-kept head and facial hair. Mattingly was sporting a longish or mullet-like hair style, and when he refused to cut it, he was benched.

Mattingly has also appeared in public-service announcements airing on the Spike TV network advocating fathers spending time with their children as part of the "True Dads" campaign to encourage men to take an active role in their children's lives.

Mattingly is referred to by name in several episodes of Seinfeld. In one episode, his uniform pants split because they were made of 100% cotton at the behest of George Costanza.

== See also ==
- List of Major League Baseball batting champions
- List of Major League Baseball annual runs batted in leaders
- List of Major League Baseball annual doubles leaders
- List of Major League Baseball career hits leaders
- List of Major League Baseball career home run leaders
- List of Major League Baseball career runs batted in leaders
- List of Major League Baseball career runs scored leaders
- List of Major League Baseball career doubles leaders
- List of Major League Baseball doubles records
- List of Major League Baseball individual streaks
- List of Major League Baseball players who spent their entire career with one franchise

Awards and achievements
Preceded by Dale Long	MLB batters with home runs in eight consecutive games July 8–18, 1987	Succeeded by Ken Griffey Jr.
Sporting positions
Preceded by Willie Randolph	New York Yankees captain February 28, 1991, to October 8, 1995	Succeeded by Derek Jeter
Preceded by Rick Down	New York Yankees hitting coach 2004–2006	Succeeded by Kevin Long
Preceded by Lee Mazzilli	New York Yankees bench coach 2007	Succeeded by Rob Thomson
Preceded by Mike Easler	Los Angeles Dodgers hitting coach 2008–2010	Succeeded by Jeff Pentland
