= Devin Moore (running back) =

American football player (born 1985)

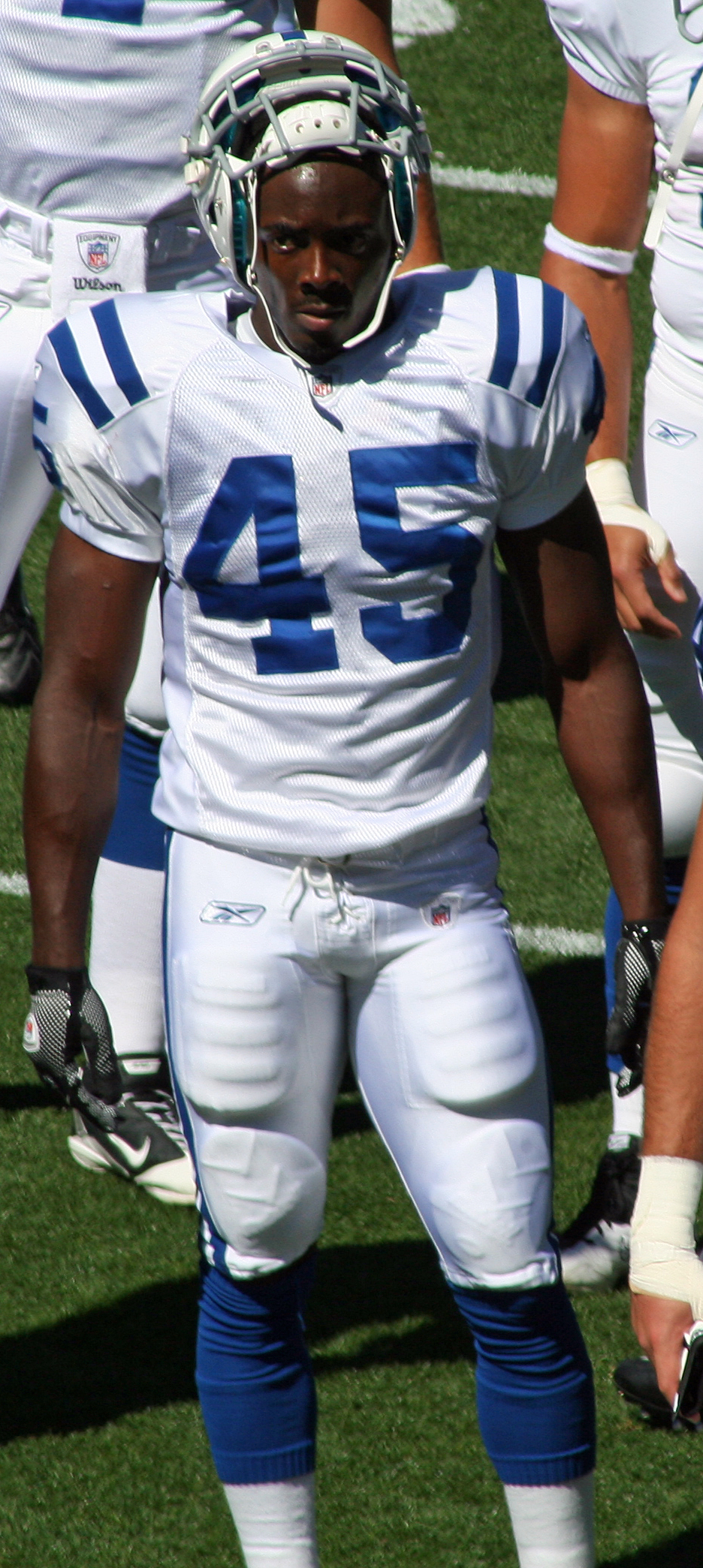
- Moore with the Indianapolis Colts in 2010

No. 45, 37
- Position: Running back

Personal information
- Born: November 6, 1985 (age 41); Indianapolis, Indiana, U.S.
- Listed height: 5 ft 9 in (1.75 m)
- Listed weight: 190 lb (86 kg)

Career information
- High school: Ritter (Indianapolis)
- College: Wyoming
- NFL draft: 2009: undrafted

Career history
- Seattle Seahawks (2009)*; Carolina Panthers (2009)*; Indianapolis Colts (2009–2011); Detroit Lions (2012)*; Las Vegas Locomotives (2012)
- * Offseason or practice squad member only

Awards and highlights
- First-team All-MW (2008)

Career NFL statistics
- Rushing yards: −2
- Rushing average: −1
- Return yards: 257
- Stats at Pro Football Reference

Devin Moore (born November 6, 1985) is an American former professional football player who was a running back and kick returner in the National Football League (NFL). He was signed by the Seattle Seahawks as an undrafted free agent in 2009. Moore graduated from Cardinal Ritter High School in Indianapolis, Indiana. He played college football for the Wyoming Cowboys.

Pre-draft measurables
Height	Weight	40-yard dash	10-yard split	20-yard split	20-yard shuttle	Three-cone drill	Vertical jump	Broad jump	Bench press
5 ft 9 5/8 in (1.77 m)	187 lb (85 kg)	4.34 s	1.48 s	2.52 s	4.08 s	6.92 s	35.0 in (0.89 m)	10 ft 9 in (3.28 m)	28 reps
All values from Pro Day

Moore was also a member of the Carolina Panthers and Indianapolis Colts. Moore was most recently a member of the Detroit Lions, but was cut before training camp in May 2013. Moore also played in the United Football League (UFL) with the Las Vegas Locomotives.

Moore saw his only regular season play with the Indianapolis Colts, where he was primarily used for special teams and as a kick returner.

As of November 2021, Moore is President of the National Football League Players Association Indianapolis Chapter.

== Personal life ==
Moore is the son of Kevin and Shelia Moore. Kevin Moore died of Lung Cancer when Moore was 12. Moore is married to Whitney Moore and has 3 children.

Moore founded, and is CEO and President of Moore Surety Bonds Agency located in Indianapolis, Indiana.
