= Goebel Soccer Complex =

Sports complex in Indiana, U.S.

Coordinates: 38.039580°N 87.491658°W

- Interactive map of Goebel Soccer Complex
- Location: Evansville, Indiana, United States
- Operator: Evansville Convention & Visitors Bureau
- Capacity: Various
- Surface: Bermuda grass, AstroPlay turf

Construction
- Opened: 2004

Tenants
- Evansville Legends FC (OVPL) (2021-present); Evansville Enforcers (GMFL) (2011-2016); Tri-State Titans (MOFL) (2008-2009); Ohio River Bearcats (MFL) (2008); Evansville Vipers (OFL) (2004-2006); Evansville Express (NWFA) (2004-2005)

Goebel Soccer Complex is a multi-purpose, $3.4 million project that opened in the spring of 2004 on 70 acres (280,000 m^{2}) of land in Evansville, Indiana. The facility has nine Olympic-size irrigated Bermuda grass fields and one Olympic-size AstroPlay turf field. The main field and five of the grass fields have lights for night play. In addition to soccer, the complex also hosts football and lacrosse events.

== Professional teams ==
The facility has been home to various minor league football teams including the Evansville Enforcers of the Great Midwest Football League, the Evansville Vipers of the Ohio Valley Football League, the Tri-State Titans of the Mid Ohio Football League, the Ohio River Bearcats of the Midwest Football League and the Evansville Express of the National Women's Football Association.

Starting in 2021, the Evansville Legends FC of the Ohio Valley Premier League will be playing home matches on the facility's main ground, Old National Bank Field.

== See also ==
- Sports in Evansville
- EVSC Double Cola Fields
