= Cardinal Ritter High School =

Private school in Indianapolis, Indiana, United States

Location
- 3360 West 30th Street; Indianapolis, Indiana 46222; United States; 39°48′36″N 86°12′55″W

Information
- Type: Private, Coeducational
- Motto: Miles Christi Sum (I Am a Soldier of Christ)
- Religious affiliation: Roman Catholic
- Established: 1964
- School district: Archdiocese of Indianapolis
- President: E. Jo Hoy
- Principal: Kari Jost
- Chaplain: Fr. John Kamwendo
- Grades: 7–12
- Color
- Athletics conference: Indiana Crossroads Conference
- Nickname: Raiders
- Accreditation: North Central Association of Colleges and Schools
- Eponym: Cardinal Joseph Ritter
- Website: Official Website

Cardinal Ritter High School is a private, Roman Catholic high school on West 30th Street in Indianapolis, Indiana. It is part of the Roman Catholic Archdiocese of Indianapolis. Founded in 1964, it serves the west side of the Indianapolis metropolitan area.

== History ==
Cardinal Ritter High School opened in 1964, named after Cardinal Joseph E. Ritter, seventh bishop and first archbishop of Indianapolis. Cardinal Ritter was born in 1892, ordained in 1917, and became known for his work in desegregation. In 1938, he ordered all diocese schools to integrate, 16 years before Brown v. Board of Education. He was appointed the first archbishop of Indianapolis in 1944, and two years later was appointed archbishop of St. Louis.

== Community involvement ==
In 2008, service to the west side expanded to include the new "Rittertown" initiative. Through "Rittertown", Cardinal Ritter High School expanded its Service Learning Program beyond the campus boundaries and into the community surrounding the school. The entire Cardinal Ritter High School family came together with the mayor of Indianapolis, the Indianapolis Colts, and the City of Indianapolis' Peace in the Streets - Stop the Violence campaign. The idea of "Rittertown" is to make this community a better place for its residents to live. It also elevates the legacy of Cardinal Joseph Ritter to its proper place. The students help to make this a reality with service projects in the community. Those projects include: beautification projects in area parks, visits with the elderly at local nursing homes, and English as a Second Language classes for adults in the area. "Rittertown" helps to continue to elevate the legacy of Cardinal Joseph Ritter in the city of Indianapolis.

In 2010, the Cardinal Ritter team won the Brain Game; the next year they were runner-up.

== Athletic championships ==
- Football - 1977, 2003, 2008, 2013, 2016
- Baseball - 2017

== Notable alumni ==
- John Andretti ('81) professional racecar driver
- Devin Moore ('04) professional football player
- Sarah Bacon ('15) diver, 2020 Olympics, 2024 Silver Medalist.

== See also ==
- List of schools in Indianapolis
- List of high schools in Indiana
