= Sunken Gardens =

Sunken Gardens may refer to:

== Gardens ==
=== United States ===
- Ball Nurses' Sunken Garden and Convalescent Park, in Indianapolis, Indiana
- McCasland Sunken Garden, in the Dallas Arboretum and Botanical Garden
- San Antonio Japanese Tea Garden also called Sunken Gardens, in San Antonio, Texas
- Scott Sunken Garden, a historical landmark in Lansing, Michigan
- Sunken Gardens (Denver, Colorado), listed on the National Register of Historic Places in northeast Denver
- Sunken Gardens (Florida), in St. Petersburg, Florida
- Sunken Gardens (Huntington, Indiana)
- Sunken Gardens (Nebraska), in Lincoln, Nebraska
- Sunken Garden (Virginia), at The College of William & Mary in Virginia

=== Other places ===
- Muntinlupa Sunken Garden, Metro Manila, Philippines
- Cistern of Mocius (Altımermer Çukurbostanı, Turkish for Sunken garden of Altımermer), Istanbul, Turkey
- Sunken Gardens in Jackson Park, Windsor, Ontario, Canada
- Sunken Garden in Woolton Woods, Liverpool, England

== Other uses ==
- Sunken Garden, a 2013 opera by Michel van der Aa and David Mitchell
- Sunken Garden United F.C., an association football based club in the Philippines
