= Mesker Park Zoo and Botanic Garden =

Zoo and botanic garden in Evansville, Indiana, United States

Mesker Park Zoo

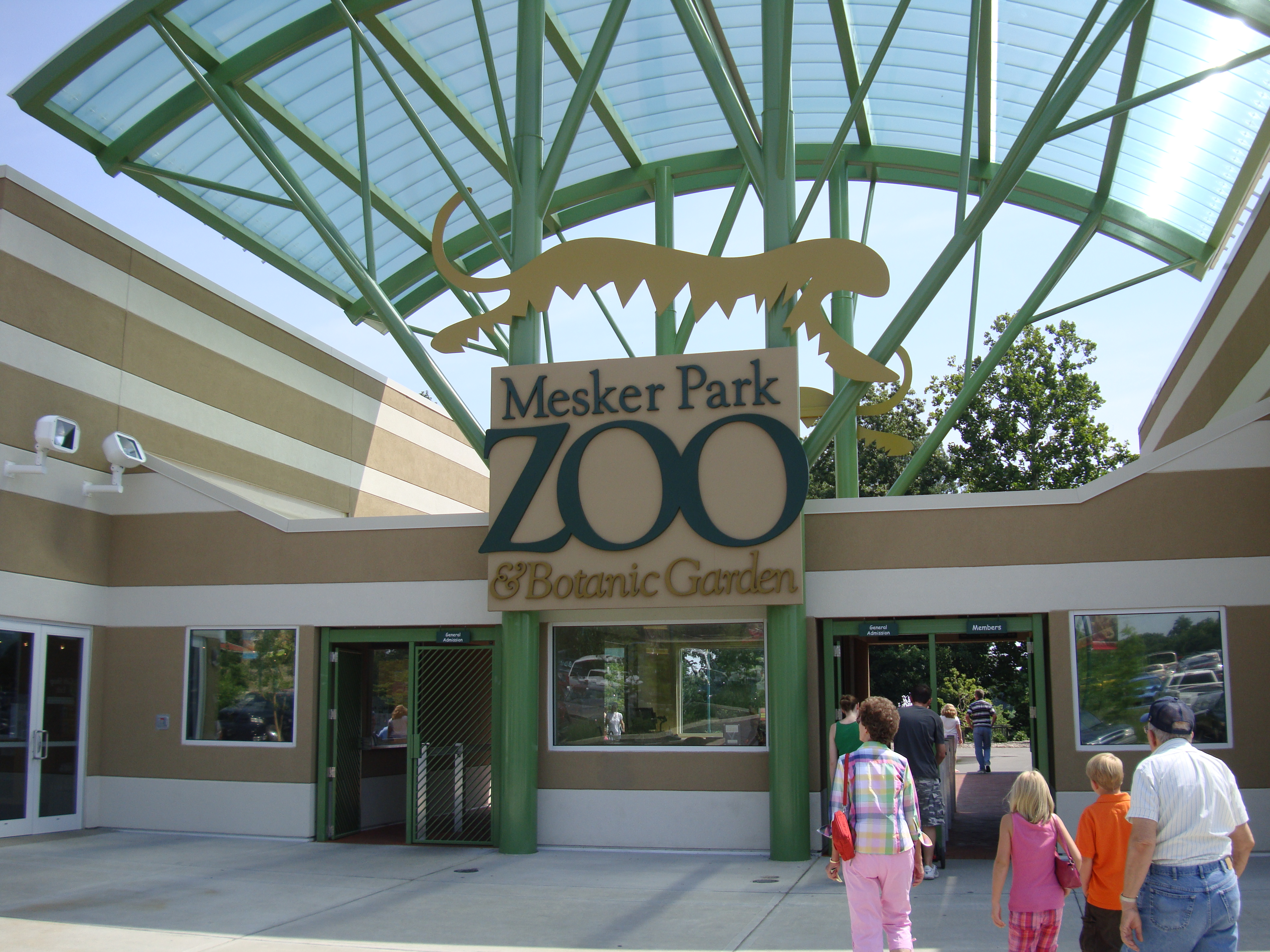
- Zoo entrance
- Interactive map of Mesker Park Zoo
- 37.9971°N 87.6016°W
- Date opened: 1928
- Location: Evansville, Indiana, United States
- Land area: 50 acres (20 ha)
- No. of animals: 700+
- No. of species: 200
- Memberships: AZA
- Major exhibits: African Rift, African Panorama, Amazonia, Australia, North America, and South America
- Management: VenuWorks
- Public transit: METS
- Website: www.meskerparkzoo.com

The Mesker Park Zoo and Botanic Garden is a zoo that opened in 1928 in Evansville, Indiana, United States. It is located in Mesker Park on Evansville's northwest side and is run by the City of Evansville.

The Mesker Park Zoo and Botanic Garden is accredited by the Association of Zoos and Aquariums.

== History ==
The zoo was founded in 1928 by Gilmore M. Haynie and other business leaders. Karl Kae Knecht, a local cartoonist for the Evansville Courier & Press, helped popularize the idea of a zoo. It initially opened with two lion cubs, some antelope, and an elephant.

In 1933, a 1:3 scale replica of the Santa Maria was opened as a monkey exhibit. The "Monkey Ship" was originally home to rhesus macaques, and eventually housed capuchin monkeys, lemurs, and juvenile American alligators in the pool surrounding the ship. The exhibit was closed in 1991 as the animals were moved to naturalistic habitats, and the ship and pool were eventually restored as a bumper boat attraction for children.

In 2008 the zoo finished a major expansion including the $15 million tropical rainforest exhibit and a new entry complex. The new exhibit was credited with drawing more than 38,000 visitors in its first month. One of two existing lakes in the zoo was filled in to make the exhibit, which added more than 150 animals to the zoo.

In 2017, the zoo added Engelbrecht Carousel, with an adjacent bird aviary added in 2018. This is the zoo's second carousel; its historic original carousel was moved to Carowinds in 1979. The total cost for this project is $3 million.

The Penguins of Patagonia exhibit, featuring over a dozen Humboldt Penguins native to parts of Chilé and Peru, opened to visitors in late October 2021. Additionally, the zoo plans to revamp the African Rift area when funding becomes available.

== Exhibits ==
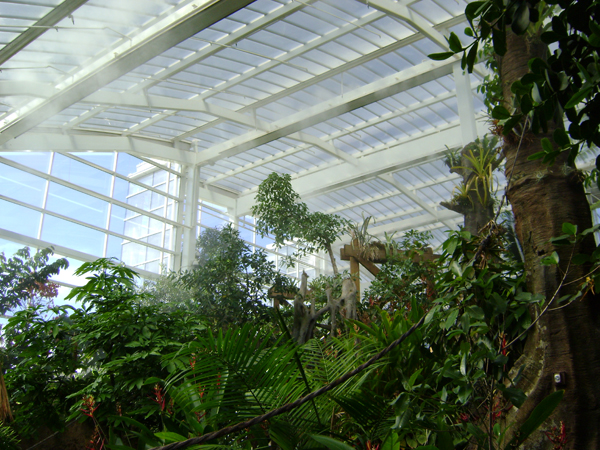
The Amazonia rainforest exhibit opened to the public in 2008.

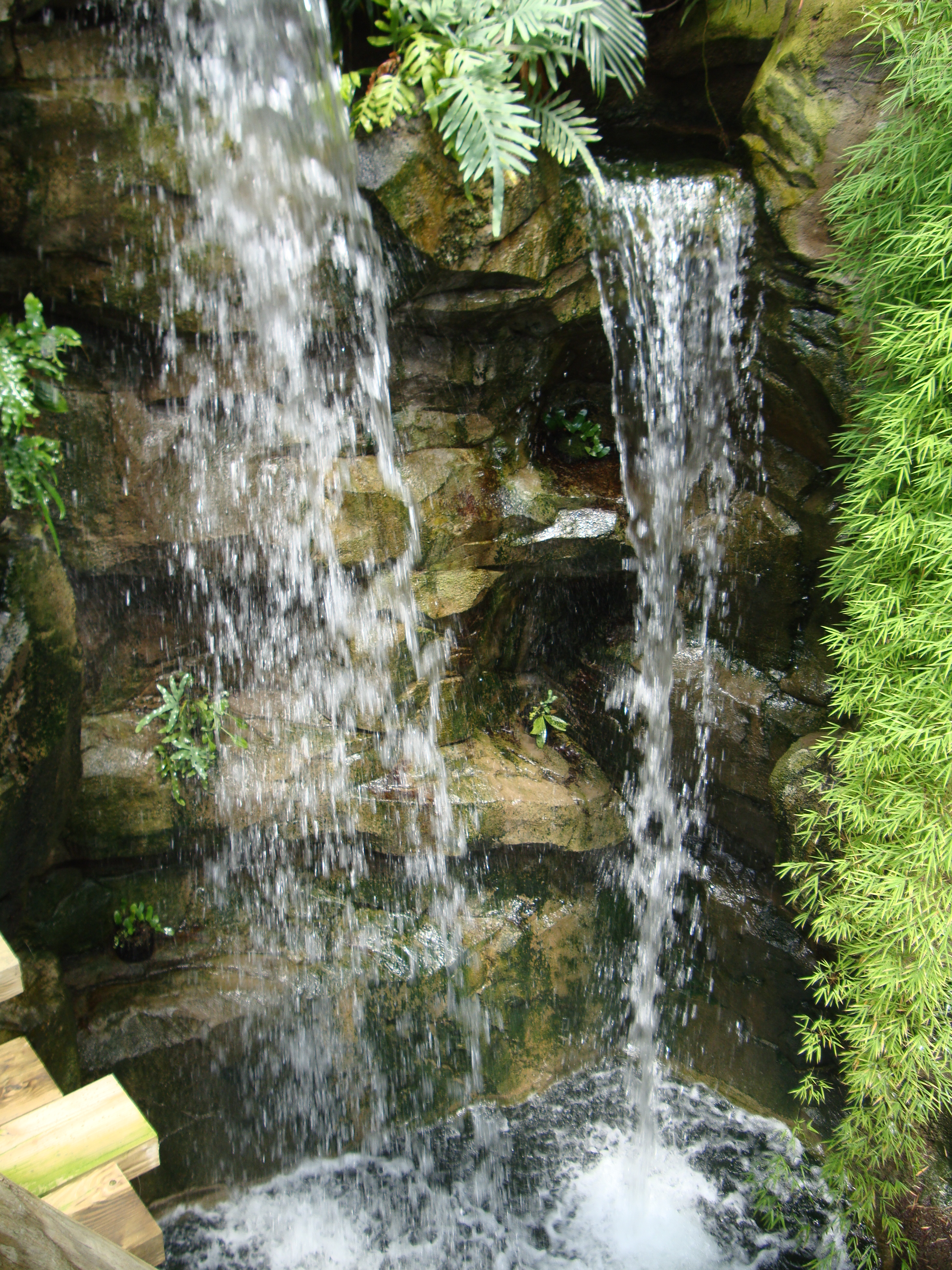
A waterfall from the Amazonia exhibit

Mesker Park was one of the first zoos in the United States to use a moat system to display animals in naturalistic exhibits resembling the animals' native habitat. Over the years, the zoo has continued to make improvements in habitat design.

=== Amazonia ===
Amazonia is a Central/South American focused rainforest exhibit that opened in 2008. While there are large structures within the exhibit designed to look like vegetation, many of the plants seen within are in fact living plants, maintained by the zoo's grounds crew. As such, the exhibit grows and changes in time as plants are added and occasionally trimmed so as to not completely block out the sunlight. The exhibit added more than 150 animals to the zoo and is currently highlighted by jaguars, Baird's tapir, bats, black howler monkeys, squirrel monkeys, prehensile-tailed porcupines, Arrau turtles, Cuvier's dwarf caiman, and several fish species from the Amazonian River system. The open spaces of the exhibit also function as a free-flight bird aviary, and house over ten species of birds.

=== Penguins of Patagonia ===
Penguins of Patagonia is an outdoor humboldt penguin exhibit.

=== North America ===
North America includes a large Mexican gray wolf enclosure.

=== Discovery Center ===
The Discovery Center is an indoor/outdoor exhibit that focuses on conservation, education, and endangered species. It also houses the zoo's education department and many of the animal used in educational programs. This exhibit contains Francois' langur, red pandas, ring-tailed lemurs, ocelot and several smaller reptile enclosures. Of particular note is the hellbender salamander exhibit, where the zoo displays and raises juvenile eastern hellbenders as part of a statewide conservation program, in association with Purdue University and the Indiana Department of Natural Resources.

=== Lemur Forest ===
Lemur Forest was opened in 1999 to house the zoo's lemurs. It currently holds three species: ring-tailed lemurs, red ruffed lemurs and Coquerel's sifaka.

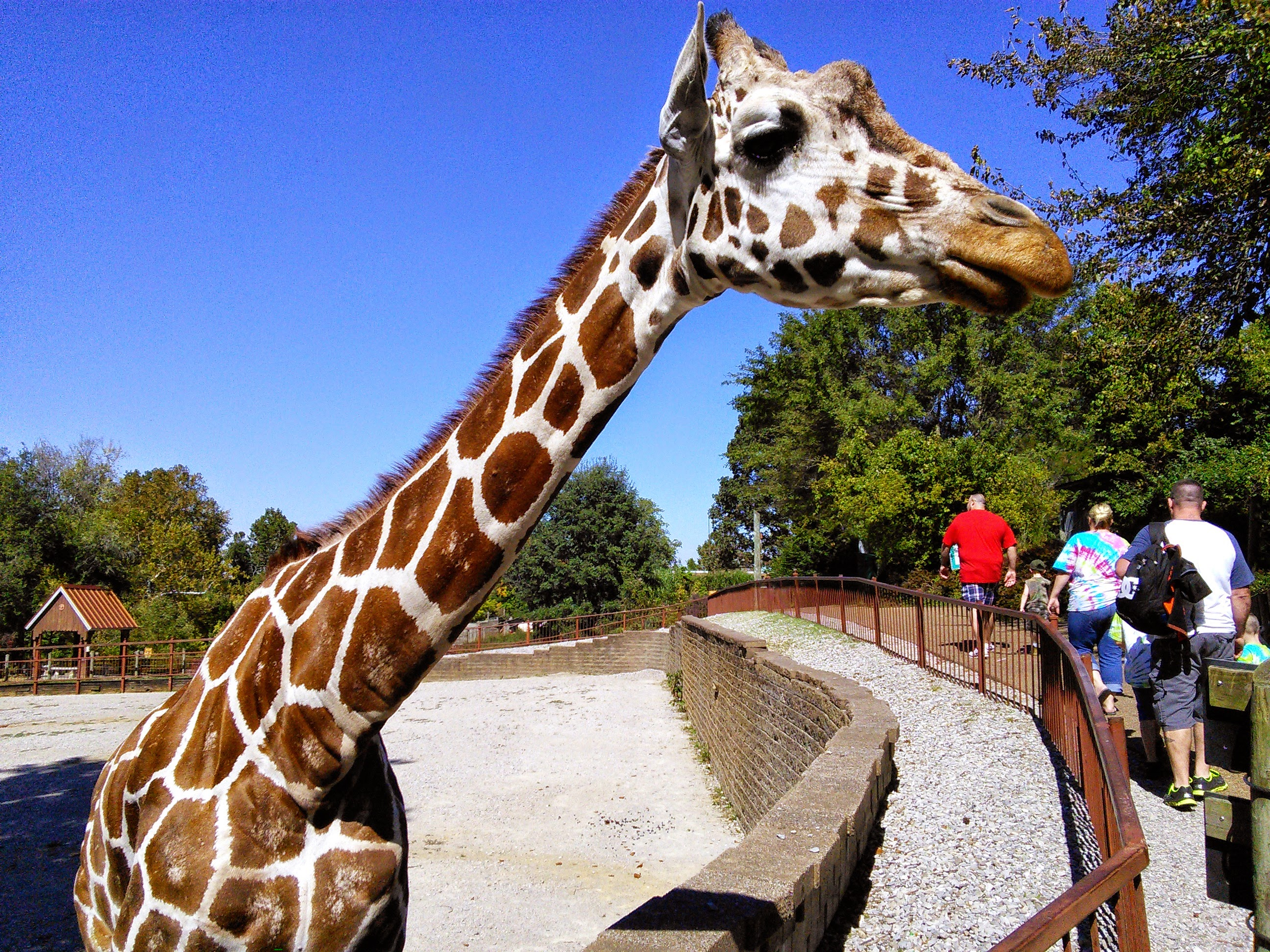
A giraffe from the African Rift exhibit

=== African Rift ===
The African Rift area includes reticulated giraffes, Grant's zebras, sitatunga, and white storks in large open areas. In July 2018, the zoo welcomed a new 10-month-old giraffe named Clementine.

=== Kley Building ===
The Kley Building was built in the 1950s and houses several exhibits. The upper floor contains a newly renovated nocturnal exhibit, a reptile exhibit hall featuring rhinoceros iguana and Komodo dragon, and a hall used for meetings or special events. The lower floor contains the indoor portion of the zoo's Indian rhinoceros exhibit. This floor was once home to Bunny, an Asian elephant, and Donna, formerly the world's oldest living captive hippopotamus. Donna was euthanized at the age of 60 in 2012, because of age-related failing health. A small statue of Donna was constructed by the Zoo's Panorama playground in her memory.

=== Asia & Australia ===
This area reproduces habitats for Asian and Australian animals. It includes the outdoor exhibits for the zoo's Indian rhinoceros, as well as Bactrian camels, Siberian tiger, Müller's gibbons, Sichuan takin, laughing kookaburra, and emu.

=== Children's Enchanted Forest ===
This exhibit is geared towards children and contains several playground elements and a seasonal petting zoo in addition to traditional zoo exhibits. It is home to North American river otters, eastern black-and-white colobus monkeys, binturong, crested porcupine, and scarlet macaws. Nearby attractions include the Engelbrecht Carousel, a budgerigar aviary and seasonal exhibits for tortoises.

=== Lake Victoria ===
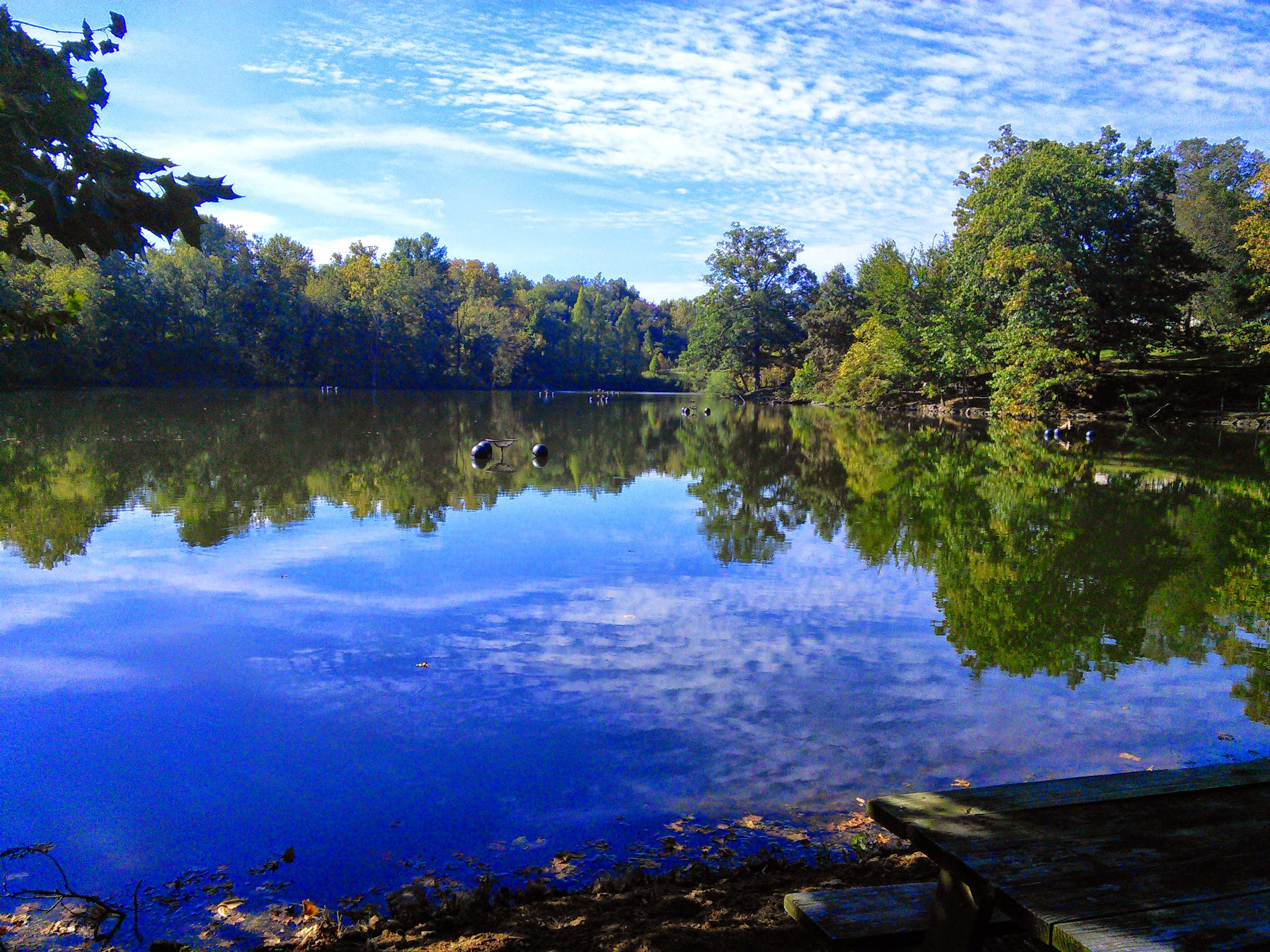
Lake Victoria

Lake Victoria is home to wild resident and migrating birds, as well as turtles and fish. Visitors can walk along two sides of the lake, or rent paddle boats to explore the lake during warmer months. This is the largest lake in the zoo, and is the feature around which the zoo was built.

=== African Panorama ===
African Panorama is a set of enclosures built around a large, open African savanna exhibit, with observation platforms at the top of the hill, or a trail visitors can use at the bottom. The main exhibit features Abyssinian ground hornbills, ostriches, greater kudu and sitatunga. Smaller exhibits feature a giant anteater, Patagonian mara, turkey vulture and blue duikers.

== Botanical features ==
In addition to the live plants inside Amazonia, the grounds of the Mesker Park Zoo feature several gardens designed for guest experience, as well as plants specifically cultivated for zoo animal consumption. Zookeepers harvest these plants throughout the year as part of their animals' diets.

Each year, in February, a variety of orchids line the Amazonia exhibit as part of the Orchid Escape event. There is also a plant sale fundraiser in the spring, where guests can purchase young specimens of plants seen throughout the zoo.

== Additional attractions and programs ==
The zoo also contains a playground, cafe, gift shop, and tram. The zoo also provides a wide variety of programming, from birthday parties to summer camps to outreach programs, as well as teen and adult volunteer opportunities.

== Conservation ==
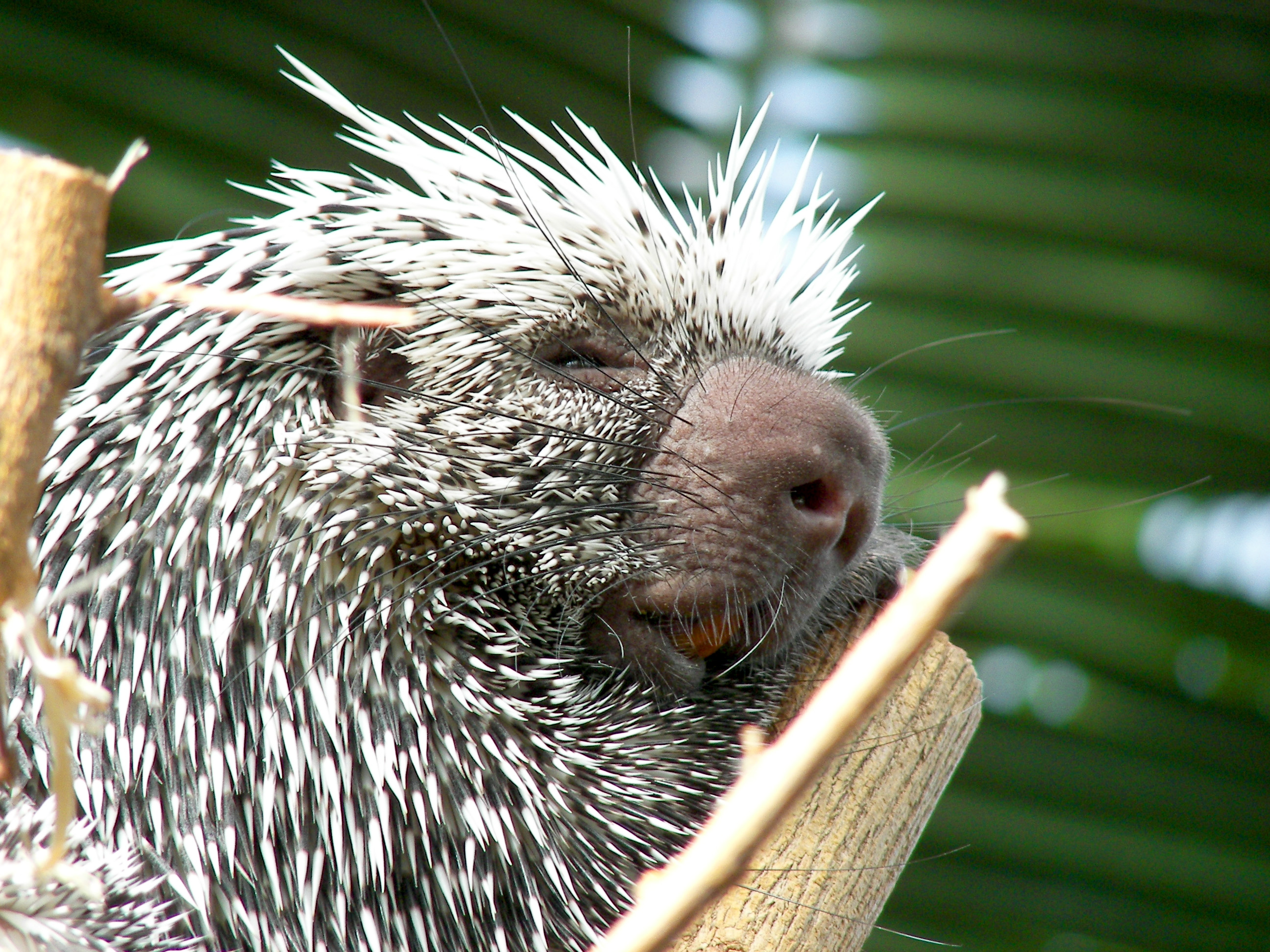

Many of the animals at the zoo are part of breeding programs organized by the AZA and the zoo is therefore recommended to breed (or not breed) its animals in accordance with those programs. Some recent births include Francois' langur, sitatunga, takin, African crested porcupine, colobus monkey, and lesser tenrec.

Mesker Park Zoo houses Mexican gray wolves, a critically endangered animal, and works with United States Fish and Wildlife Service as part of their recovery plan for this species. The zoo participates in cross-fostering, which involves producing litters of pups in captivity that are reintroduced into wild packs to bolster the species' wild gene pool and increase the wild population.

The zoo is also involved in eastern hellbender conservation, and is partnered with Purdue University and Indiana's Department of Natural Resources in their efforts to repopulate this subspecies of salamander. The zoo currently has a public display of tanks holding juvenile hellbenders, which are returned to their habitat once they have reached a certain, less predated size, and an off-display adult stream containing several adult salamanders. In 2020, Mesker Park Zoo was the first facility where eastern hellbender salamanders bred naturally in human care, which the animal curators attribute to adjustments in the water parameters and sex ratio of salamanders in the artificial stream.

== See also ==
- List of botanical gardens and arboretums in Indiana
- List of zoos in the United States
