= List of nature centers in Indiana =

This is a list of nature centers and environmental education centers in the state of Indiana.

To use the sortable tables: click on the icons at the top of each column to sort that column in alphabetical order; click again for reverse alphabetical order.

Name	Location	County	Region	Summary
Bendix Woods	New Carlisle	St. Joseph	Northern Indiana	195 acres including 26-acre state dedicated nature preserve, children's discovery room, operated by the County
Brown County State Park Nature Center	Nashville	Brown	Southern Indiana	15,776 acres, features the Brown County Interpretive Center
Cagles Mill Lake	Cloverdale	Putnam	Central Indiana	8,075 acres, reservoir and state recreation area, features the Cable Mills Interpretive Center
Chain O'Lakes State Park Interpretive Center	Albion	Noble	Northern Indiana	2,718 acres, one-room schoolhouse nature center
Clifty Falls State Park	Madison	Jefferson	Southern Indiana	1,416 acres, includes a nature center
Cool Creek Park and Nature Center	Carmel	Hamilton	Central Indiana	website, 90 acres, operated by the County
Cope Environmental Center	Centerville	Wayne	Central Indiana	website, 130 acres, focus on sustainable living
Dunes Learning Center	Chesterton	Porter	Northern Indiana	website, residential environmental education camp for the Indiana Dunes National Lakeshore
Eagle Creek Park	Indianapolis	Marion	Central Indiana	3,900 acres, features the Earth Discovery Center and the Ornithology Center about birds
Falls of the Ohio State Park	Clarksville	Clark	Southern Indiana	165 acres, visitor center museum exhibits about the park's fossil beds, natural and human history
Fort Harrison State Park	Lawrence	Marion	Central Indiana	1,700 acres, interpretive center with environmental education programs
Harmonie State Park	New Harmony	Posey	Southwestern Indiana	3,465 acres
Hayes Arboretum	Richmond	Wayne	Central Indiana	355 acres, displays about trees, native woods and plants, flora and fauna
Hilltop Garden and Nature Center	Bloomington	Monroe	Southern Indiana	website, operated by Indiana University, demonstration gardens, gardening and nature education programs
Holliday Park and Nature Center	Indianapolis	Marion	Central Indiana	website, 95 acres, operated by the city, Marion County and Holliday Park natural and environmental history, features hands-on, discovery-based activities for all ages
Indiana Dunes State Park Nature Center	Chesterton	Porter	Northern Indiana	2,182 acres (883 ha), nature center open year-round
Kirkendall Nature Center	Kokomo	Howard	Central Indiana	website, operated by the City in the 100-acre Jackson Morrow Park, features aquariums, mounts of area mammals, birds, insects, fish, fossils
Lilly Nature Center	West Lafayette	Tippecanoe	Central Indiana	website, operated by the City in 195-acre Celery Bog Nature Area
Lincoln State Park Nature Center	Lincoln City	Spencer	Southwestern Indiana	1,747 acres, park includes boyhood home of President Abraham Lincoln and the Lincoln Interpretive Center by the Pine Hills area
Luhr County Park & Nature Center	La Porte	La Porte	Northern Indiana	website, 89 acres, operated by the county, hands-on environmental displays and exhibits, live animals, and wildlife observation room
Maplewood Nature Center	LaGrange	LaGrange	Northern Indiana	website, operated by the County in 90-acre LaGrange County Nature Preserve
McCloud Nature Park	North Salem	Hendricks	Central Indiana	website, operated by the county, 232-acre park, nature center features interactive nature exhibits, bird viewing area, greenhouse, resource library and monthly rotating art exhibits
McCormick's Creek State Park	Spencer	Owen	Central Indiana	1,924 acres, includes a nature center
Merry Lea Environmental Center	Wolf Lake	Noble	Northern Indiana	1,150 acres, operated by Goshen College, programs for schools, field laboratory for students studying ecology, environmental education and agroecology
Metea County Park	Leo-Cedarville	Allen	Northern Indiana	website, operated by the county, 250 acres, includes the Gloria Goeglein Nature Center
Mounds State Park	Anderson	Madison	Central Indiana	251 acres, interpretive center includes a wildlife viewing room, animal displays, interactive games, exhibits about the 10 ceremonial mounds built by the prehistoric Adena culture
O'Bannon Woods State Park	Corydon	Harrison	Southern Indiana	2,000 acres, houses the O'Bannon Woods Interpretive Center, which offers exhibits and nature programs year round
Patoka Lake Interpretive Center	Birdseye	Dubois	Southwestern Indiana	25,800 acres with 8,800-acre reservoir
Paynetown State Recreation Area Activity Center		Monroe	Southern Indiana	Nature center at the Paynetown Beach, drop-in activities, live reptiles, open seasonally
Pokagon Nature Center	Angola	Steuben	Northern Indiana	Located in 1,260-acre Pokagon State Park, animals and displays about Pokagon and its surrounding areas
Potato Creek State Park	North Liberty	St. Joseph	Northern Indiana	3,840 acres, nature center includes live animals
Rum Village Nature Center	South Bend	St. Joseph	Northern Indiana	website, 160 acres, operated by the city, exhibits about the plant and animal life of northern Indiana
Salamonie Interpretive and Nature Center	Andrews	Huntington	Northern Indiana	website, operated by the State, programs for the J.E. Roush Fish and Wildlife Area, Mississinewa Lake, Ouabache State Park, Salamonie Lake and Salamonie River State Forest, features live animals, interactive reservoir exhibits, natural and cultural history displays
Shakamak State Park	Jasonville	Greene	Southern Indiana	1,766 acres, seasonal nature center
Spicer Lake Nature Center	New Carlisle	St. Joseph	Northern Indiana	website, 320 acres, trails along wetlands, woods and old-growth fields, nature center, environmental education programs, operated by the County
Spring Mill State Park	Mitchell	Lawrence	Southern Indiana	1,358 acres, park includes a pioneer village, nature center, memorial for astronaut Gus Grissom, cave tours by boat
Tulip Creek Nature Center	Ligonier	Noble	Northern Indiana	website, 50-acre nature preserve
Turkey Run State Park	Marshall	Parke	Central	2,382 acres, nature center open year-round
Versailles State Park	Versailles	Ripley	Southern Indiana	5,988 acres, seasonal interpretive programs
Wesselman Woods Nature Preserve	Evansville	Vanderburgh	Southwestern Indiana	240 acres, owned by the city and operated by the non-profit Wesselman Woods Nature Preserve Society
Woodlawn Nature Center	Elkhart	Elkhart	Northern Indiana	website, 10 acres, natural history museum, managed by the Woodlawn Nature Council
Zion Nature Center	Zionsville	Boone	Central Indiana	website, operated by the city, supported by the Friends of Zion Nature Center

== See also ==
- List of nature centers in the United States
- List of botanical gardens and arboretums in Indiana
- List of museums in Indiana

== Resources ==
- Environmental Education Association of Indiana
