= REO Town =

- Neighborhood
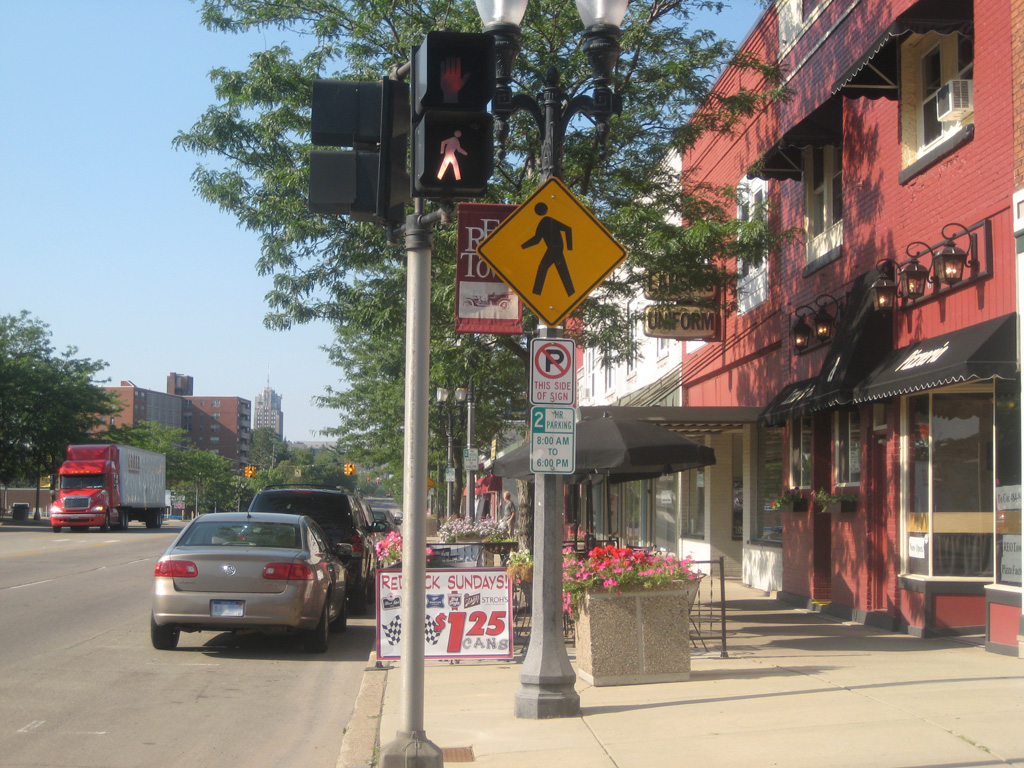
- REO Town district in Lansing, Michigan

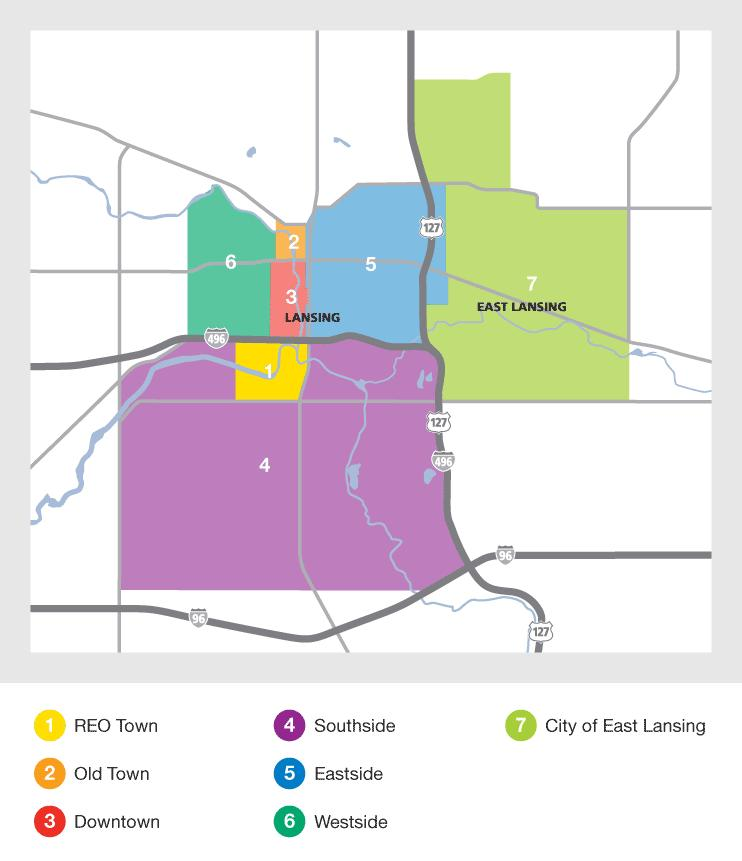
- Location in the city of Lansing, Michigan
- Coordinates: 42.7170°N 84.5537°W
- Country: United States
- State: Michigan
- County: Ingham

Area
  - Neighborhood: 0.624 sq mi (1.62 km^{2})

Population (2009)
  - Neighborhood: 1,989
  - Density: 3,190/sq mi (1,230/km^{2})
  - Metro: 454,044
- Time zone: UTC-5 (EST)
  - Summer (DST): UTC-4 (EDT)
- ZIP codes: 48910, 48912, 48933
- Area code: 517
- Website: reotown.com
- REO Town @ city-data.com

REO Town is a district in Lansing, Michigan, United States, located south of downtown. The neighborhood is bordered by West Malcolm X Street to the north; South Cedar Street BL I-96 to the east; West Mount Hope Avenue to the south; and Townsend Street, the Grand River, and South Martin Luther King Jr. Boulevard to the west.

Considered the birthplace of the commercial automobile in the US, REO Town is named after Ransom Eli Olds, an automobile pioneer, for whom both the Oldsmobile and REO brands were named.

In addition to a commercial corridor along South Washington Avenue, REO Town includes three neighborhoods: Fabulous Acres, Moores Park, and River Point.

== History ==
The area now known as REO Town started off as a road and a handful of building in 1847, with the centerpiece being a hotel called the Benton House opening 1848.

The REO Motor Car Company began producing automobiles along South Washington Avenue in REO Town in 1904 or 1905, depending on the source. The town built up around the company. Reo stopped making cars in 1936 as a result of the Great Depression, but continued to make trucks. Reo was bought out in 1958 by White Motor Corporation, and production ended in 1975. At this point the town began to fail.

REO Town had a football team, the REO City Athletes.

The town had its own band in the 1940s. The REO City Band was formed in November 1944. The first concert was January 1945.

The REO Town Commercial Association was formed in 2003 to encourage businesses and residential growth in the area.

July 2004 saw the centennial celebration of REO Town.

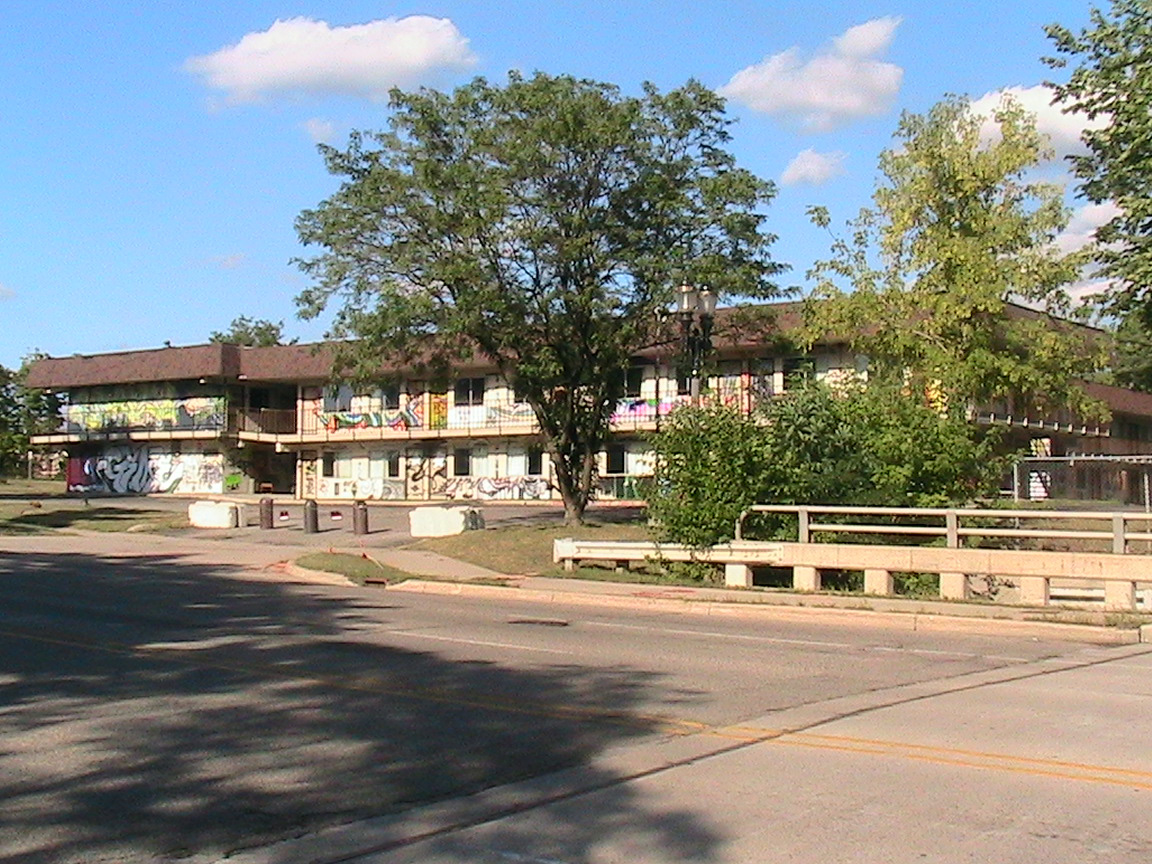
Former Deluxe Inn motel and urban art exhibit prior to September 2010 demolition

In July 2010, the Lansing Board of Water & Light announced plans to construct a $182 million natural gas-powered electric and steam generation plant along Washington Avenue in REO Town. Plans called for the renovation and reuse of the former Grand Trunk railroad station, and January 2011 they bought 5.3 acres for the plant on South Washington Avenue, which included the abandoned Grand Trunk lot. Construction began that May. 46 local companies were involved in the construction of the plant. The eight-story facility moved 180 jobs upon its opening in January 2013. The cogeneration power plant became operational on July 1, 2013.

In August 2010, the former Deluxe Inn was transformed into an outdoor urban graffiti art exhibit. The planned event attracted approximately 25 artists. The defunct motel, at the north end of REO Town, was demolished in September 2010 and is currently a large grassy lot.

In August 2011, Lansing received a $326,100 federal transportation grant to help pay for a $2.1 million streetscape project along Washington Avenue in REO Town.

== Economy ==
REO Town has several large and small employers. Its largest employer is still the automotive industry with the Lansing Grand River Assembly plant employing approximately 2,500 hourly and salary employees.

== Arts and culture ==
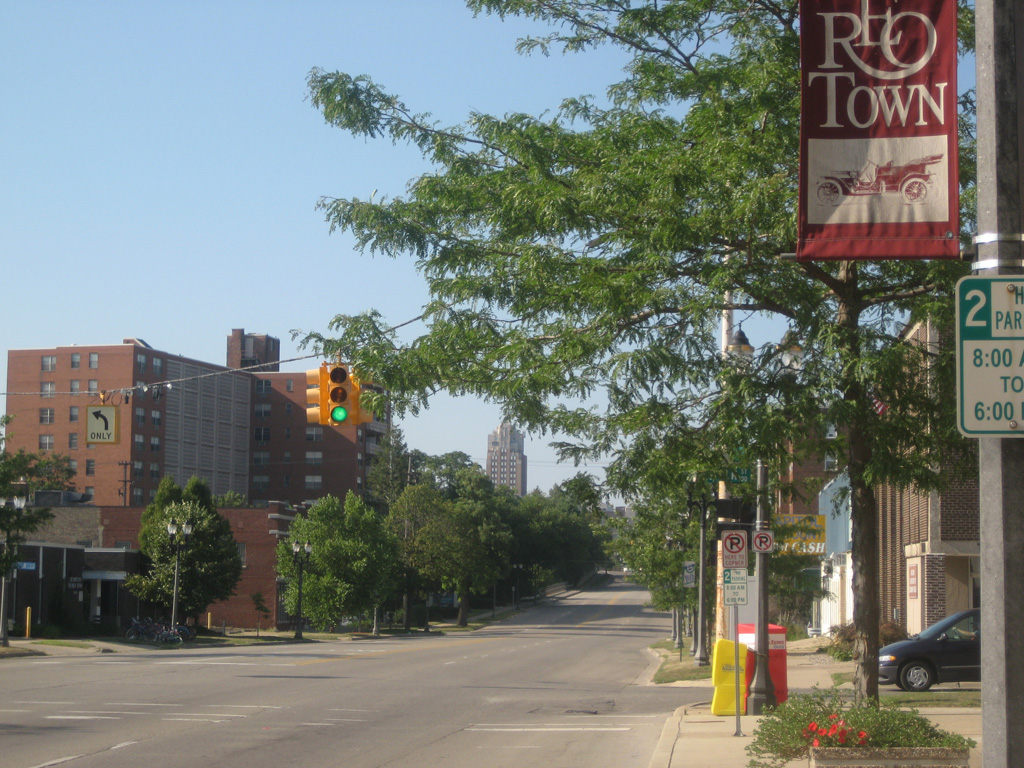
REO Town district along Washington Avenue in Lansing, Michigan

REO Town has several arts and culture events throughout the year. Art Attack, an event organized by the REO Town Commercial Association, celebrates art, live music and food. Arts Night Out is a celebration of art and culture that is put on by the Arts Council of Greater Lansing. A REO Art Guild was mentioned as early as 1924.

The Robin Theatre provides a space for poetry, live music and theater performances. REO Town also features recording studios Elm Street Recording and REO Town Recording.

Art & Craft Beerfest is a celebration of art, beer and music. It is held during the mid-winter break between other area beerfests. The festival features 20 beers from Traverse City's Right Brain Brewing Company, 10 ciders from Blake’s Hard Cider and a variety of Michigan wines. Lansing Beer Fest is now hosted on the third Saturday of June, and has been held since 2012.

On June 23, 2018, REO Town hosted the Three Stacks Music Festival, featuring Against Me!, Murder by Death, Pup, mewithoutyou, Screaming Females, Camp Cove, Petal, Oceanator, City Mouse, Worn Spirit, Stefanie Haapala, Ness Lake, and Secret Forte.

1993 saw the start of a Juneteenth celebration tradition. Starting in 2021, a second celebration was added.

Founded in 2004, REACH Studio Art Center offers free and low-cost art classes for local Lansing youth and teens. Wheel House Studios opened in September 2018, offering classes and private lessons on wheel throwing geared towards adults.

In 2021 the Scott Sunken Garden, found at the edge of REO Town, received the Plant Michigan Green Community Landscape Award. The garden was restored by the Garden Club of Greater Lansing.
