= Potawatomi Conservatories =

Botanical gardens in South Bend, Indiana, U.S.

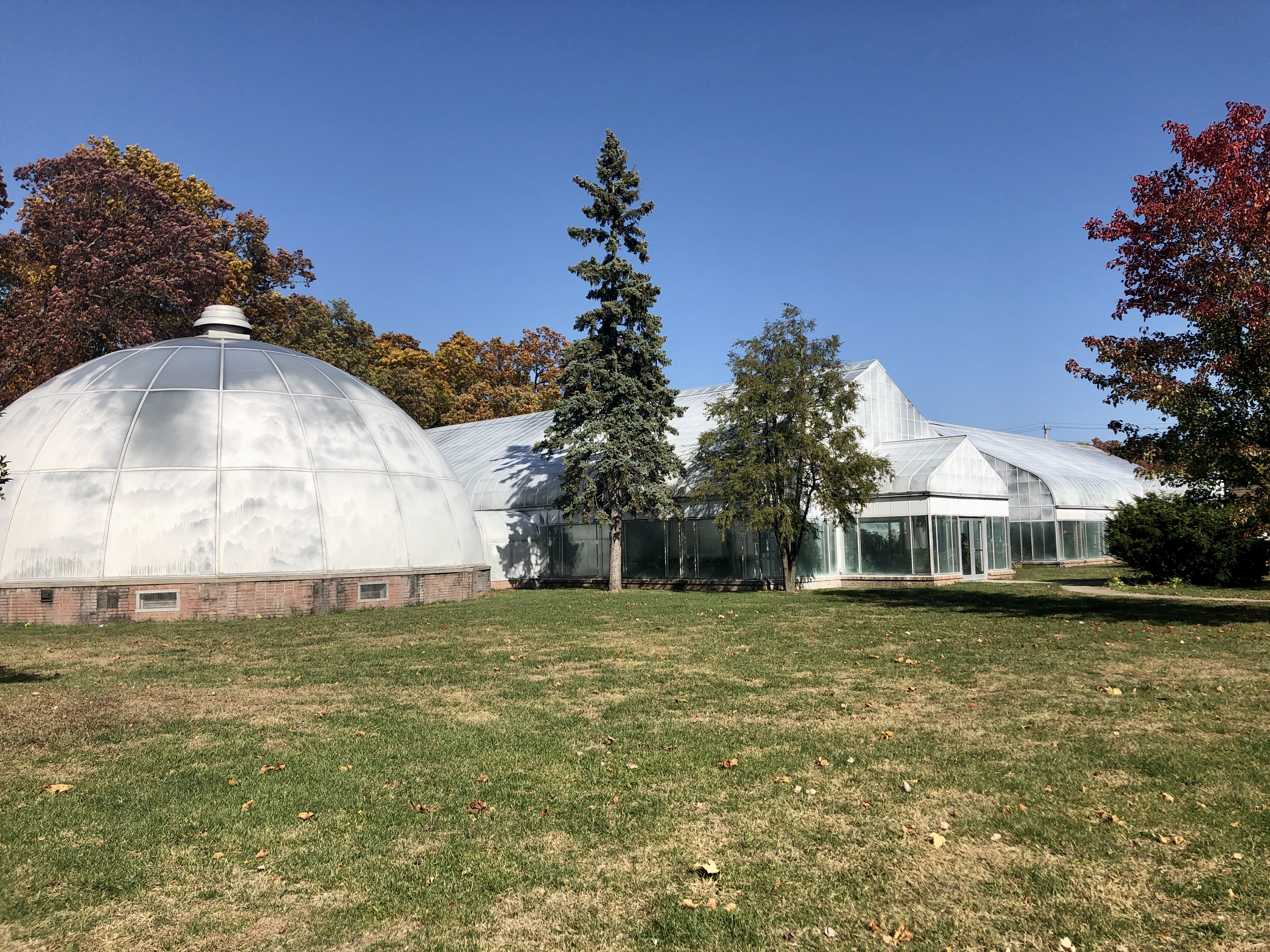
- Potawatomi Conservatories in 2022
- Interactive map of Potawatomi Conservatories
- Type: Conservatory; Botanical garden
- Location: South Bend, Indiana, U.S.
- Coordinates: 41.666°N 86.217°W
- Operator: Botanical Society of South Bend
- Open: Year-round
- Website: Official website

The Potawatomi Conservatories (also called the South Bend Conservatories) is a set of three indoor conservatories and botanical gardens in South Bend, Indiana, in the United States: The Ella Morris Conservatory; the Muessel-Ellison Botanical Conservatory, and the Muessel-Ellison Desert Dome.

== History ==
The original conservatory, the Potawatomi Greenhouse, was built by Lord & Burnham in the 1920s and was originally built as eight growing houses to raise plants for South Bend city parks and conservatories and floral shows in the region. The Ella Morris Conservatory and Muessel-Ellison Botanical Conservatory were built in the 1960s. The Desert Dome was built in 1973. Today, the conservatories are part of Potawatomi Park, which includes the Potawatomi Zoo.

In 2006, the Conservatories were almost closed due for financial reasons, specifically government budget cuts and the costs for heating the spaces. In response, the Botanical Society of South Bend took over management of the facilities. The facilities closed for renovations in 2011, which cost an estimated $1.2 million. Renovations included updating the heating, plumbing and electrical systems. The facilities also received wall repairs, new paint, windows and floors, ADA compliant bathrooms, a new potting room, and a mechanical room. The latter three updates added 1,600 square feet to the facilities. A new parking lot, sidewalk, and signage were also installed. The facilities reopened in May 2012.

== Gardens ==
The Muessel-Ellison Botanical Conservatory has introduced species including birds of paradise and bougainvillea. The Ella Morris Conservatory focuses on tropical and subtropical flora. Finally, the Desert Dome focuses on cacti, succulents and other desert plants from the Sonoran Desert, including a monkey puzzle tree.

== See also ==
- List of botanical gardens and arboretums in Indiana
