= Christy Woods =

Arboretum in Muncie, Indiana, U.S.

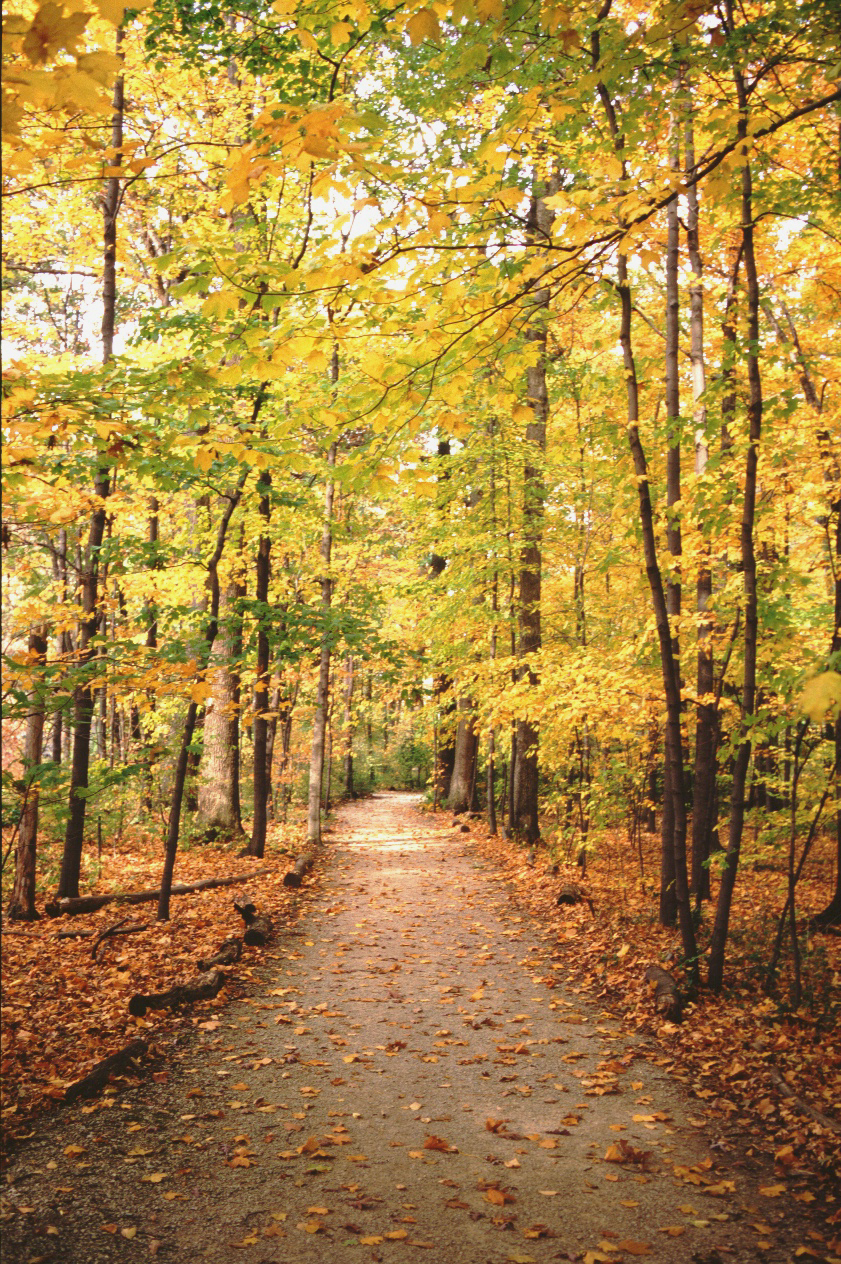
- Interactive map of Christy Woods
- Type: Arboretum and botanical garden
- Location: Old Quad; Ball State University; Muncie, Indiana; United States
- Coordinates: 40.19957°N 85.415855°W
- Area: 17 acres (6.9 ha)
- Opened: 1918
- Etymology: O. B. Christy
- Website: Official website

Christy Woods (17 acres (6.9 ha)) is an arboretum and botanical garden located on the southwest corner of the Ball State University campus in Muncie, Indiana, with special focus on Indiana's native plants and ecosystems.

Christy Woods was part of the original land gift to the State of Indiana from the Ball Brothers in 1918. Dr. O. B. Christy worked with his biology classes to transplant wild flowers from around the state of Indiana into the woods. In 1928, trails and garden beds were created, at the suggestion of J.J. Porter of Cornell University

Today approximately three-fourths of the area is covered by mature forest, dominated by a mixture of oak, hickory, ash, walnut, hackberry, and maple. Christy Woods is also home to Ball State University's four greenhouses, the Rinard Orchid Greenhouse, home of the Wheeler Orchid Collection and Species Bank, the Teaching and Research Greenhouse where the university's teaching collection for students to study is housed, the Herb Greenhouse, where herbs used by the university's Dining Services are grown and the Environmental Studies greenhouse, used for plant propagation and aquatic research.

== See also ==
- List of botanical gardens and arboretums in Indiana
