= Karl Kae Knecht =

American artist

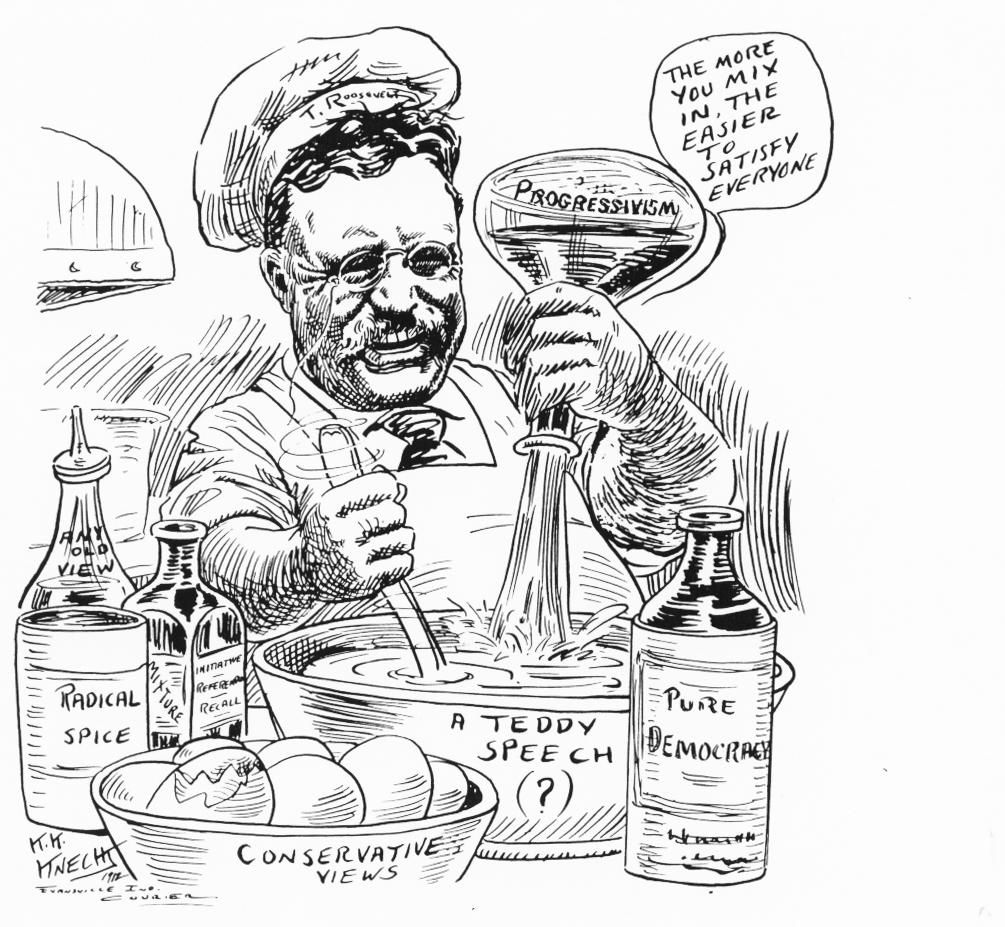
"The more you mix in, the easier to satisfy everyone", a cartoon by Knecht, Evansville Courier, Oct. 1912.

Karl Kae Knecht (December 4, 1883 – July 28, 1972) was an American artist who was the cartoonist for the Evansville Courier (now Courier & Press) from 1906 to 1960 and was instrumental in the founding of Evansville's Mesker Park Zoo. His work was the subject of a book: The World of Karl Kae Knecht Through His Cartoons by Philip C. Ensley, published in 1979 by University of Evansville Press.

== Personal life ==
Knecht was born on December 4, 1883, in Iroquois, Dakota Territory. He moved to Freeport, Illinois, at the age of 2, where his father worked as a partner in a clothing store. He had two sisters, Klara and Fay. Knecht married Jennie E. Moore of Evansville (daughter of Elwood Moore) on August 22, 1918.

He enjoyed circuses and performing as a clown, and at the age of 14, organized and presented the Knecht and Becker Circus, in which his sister Klara performed as a singer and entertainer. He was later a founding member of the "Circus Fans' Association", serving as its first secretary-treasurer starting in 1926.

Through his circus connections, Knecht was able to play an important role in the founding of Evansville's Mesker Park Zoo. He was gifted a pair of lions by the John Robinson Circus in 1928, which he donated to the city. Afterwards, he helped in raising funds for the city to purchase a baby elephant. The elephant, named "Kay" would go on to be featured in many of Knecht's cartoons, sometimes as the subject, and other times as a sort of signature or trademark in the bottom corner of the composition.

== Career ==
Following his high school graduation in 1902, Knecht worked as a yard clerk for the Illinois Central Railroad. He was transferred to Chicago the next year, where he began his formal art education. He studied at the Chicago Art Institute. Upon the completion of his art courses, he became a railroad clerk in Danville, Illinois. There, he drew cartoons that he sent to newspapers across the country in the hopes that they would offer him a job.

In 1906, Knecht became the cartoonist for the Evansville Courier and later served as the newspaper's first staff photographer. Until 1954, Knecht's work appeared on the front page, when it was moved to the editorial page. During his 54-year-long tenure, Knecht produced over 18,000 cartoons commenting on various topics, including local news, national politics, international affairs, philanthropic causes, and entertainment.
