= List of botanical gardens and arboretums in Indiana =

This list of botanical gardens and arboretums in Indiana is intended to include all significant botanical gardens and arboretums in the U.S. state of Indiana.

Name	Image	Affiliation	Municipality	Coordinates
Brincka Cross Gardens			Michigan City	41.6592°N 86.9850°W
Christy Woods		Ball State University	Muncie	40.1995°N 85.4159°W
Crown Hill Cemetery			Indianapolis	39.8202°N 86.1705°W
Foellinger-Freimann Botanical Conservatory			Fort Wayne	41.0759°N 85.1390°W
Friendship Botanic Gardens			Michigan City	41.7271°N 86.8699°W
Gabis Arboretum at Purdue Northwest		Purdue University Northwest	Valparaiso	41.4442°N 87.1532°W
Garfield Park Conservatory and Sunken Gardens			Indianapolis	39.7321°N 86.1415°W
Hartman Arboretum			Evansville	38.0283°N 87.6491°W
Hayes Arboretum			Richmond	39.8388°N 84.8482°W
James Bethel Gresham Arboretum at Locust Hill Cemetery			Evansville	38.0120°N 87.5840°W
James Irving Holcomb Botanical Gardens		Butler University	Indianapolis	39.8427°N 86.1713°W
Jerry E. Clegg Botanic Garden			Lafayette	40.4444°N 86.8283°W
Jesse H. and Beulah Chanley Cox Arboretum		Indiana University	Bloomington	39.1706°N 86.5190°W
Mesker Park Zoo and Botanic Garden			Evansville	37.9963°N 87.6050°W
Minnetrista			Muncie	40.2049°N 85.3887°W
Ogden Gardens			Valparaiso	41.4792°N 87.0665°W
Oldfields–Lilly House & Gardens		Indianapolis Museum of Art at Newfields	Indianapolis	39.8283°N 86.1854°W
Potawatomi Conservatories			South Bend	41.6661°N 86.2165°W
Purdue University Horticulture Gardens		Purdue University	West Lafayette	40.42388°N 86.915°W
Sunken Gardens			Huntington	40.8788°N 85.5061°W
Wellfield Botanic Gardens			Elkhart	41.6968°N 85.9770°W
Wheeler Orchid Collection and Species Bank		Ball State University	Muncie	40.1989°N 85.4157°W
White River Gardens		Indianapolis Zoo	Indianapolis	39.7670°N 86.1763°W
William Halbrooks Arboretum at Oak Hill Cemetery			Evansville	37.9880°N 87.5372°W

== See also ==
- List of botanical gardens and arboretums in the United States
- List of museums in Indiana
- List of nature centers in Indiana
