= Benton House (Lansing, Michigan) =

First brick building in Lansing, Michigan, United States

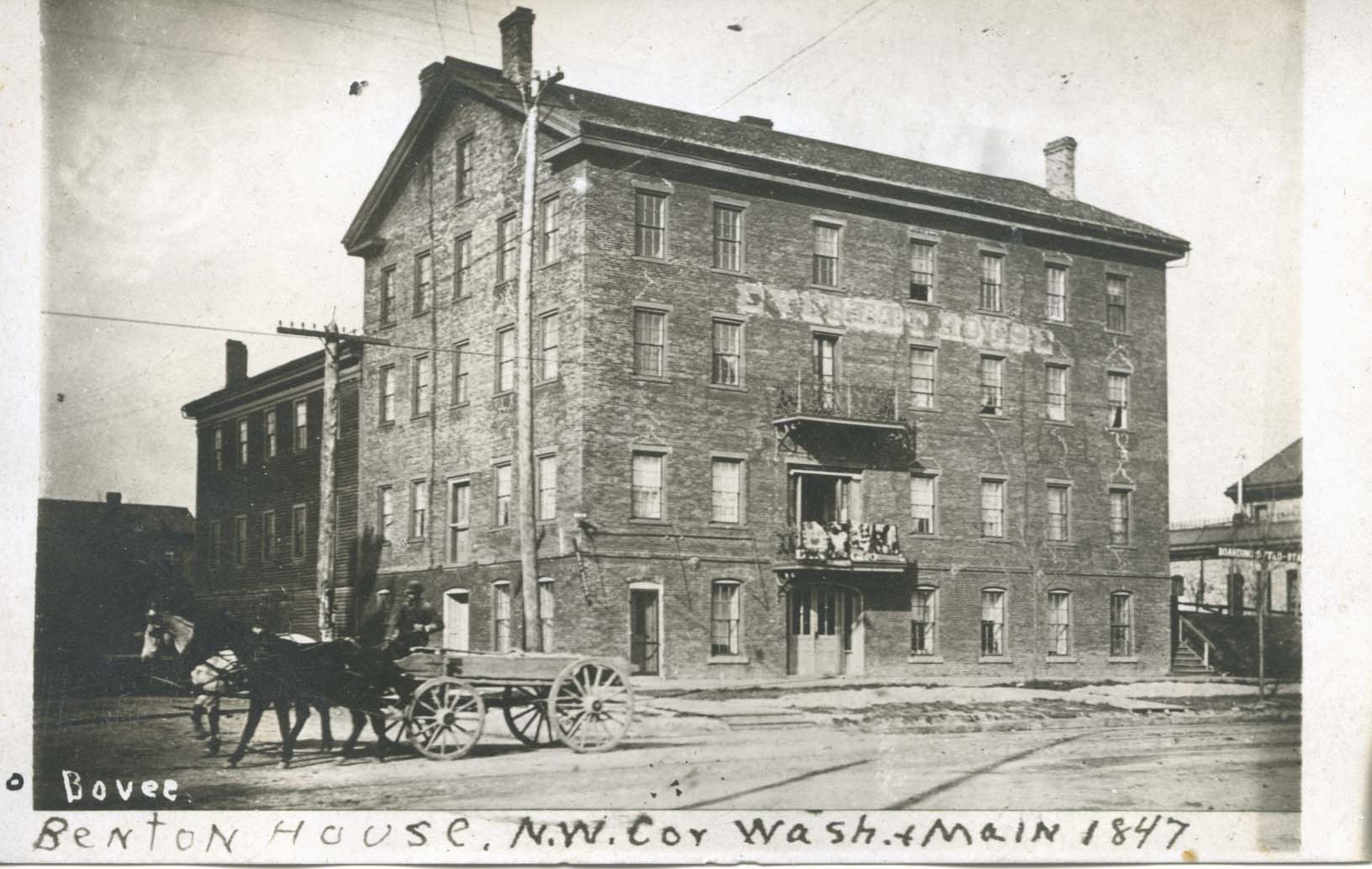
- Benton House, 1847
- Interactive map of the Benton House area

General information
- Type: Hotel
- Location: 712 South Washington Ave., Lansing, Michigan, United States
- Coordinates: 42°43′34″N 84°33′9″W
- Completed: 1847
- Opened: 1848
- Demolished: 1900

Technical details
- Floor count: 4

Design and construction
- Architects: Bush, Thomas, and Lee

Other information
- Number of rooms: 60

The Benton House was the first brick building in Lansing, Michigan, and one of the oldest hotels in the city. Located on the corner of Main Street and Washington Avenue, it was erected in 1847 and operated until 1900, when it was sold to Edward Cahill and demolished. The site was later bought by Ransom E. Olds, and he built the Olds Mansion where the Benton House once stood.

== History ==
Designed by Bush, Thomas, and Lee, the Benton House was the first brick building built in Lansing. One of the earliest hotels in the area, it became the focal point of Upper Village, the area now known as REO Town.

Opening in 1848, the four-story hotel operated for 72 years. By 1900, it was sold to Edward Cahill. Cahill razed the building. A few years later, Cahill sold the land to Ransom E. Olds, who built his house where the hotel once stood.
