= Wheeler-Thanhauser Orchid Collection and Species Bank =

Garden and seed bank in Muncie, Indiana, United States

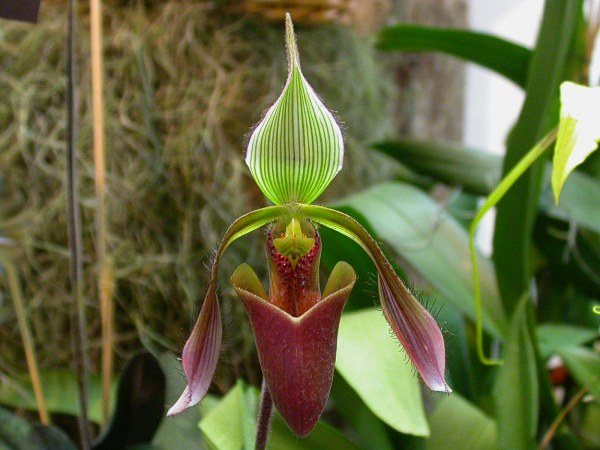
- Interactive map of Wheeler-Thanhauser Orchid Collection and Species Bank
- Type: Botanical garden
- Location: Christy Woods, Ball State University
- Nearest city: Muncie, Indiana
- Coordinates: 40°11′56.08″N 85°24′52.39″W
- Area: 3,600 square feet
- Operator: Ball State University
- Status: Open
- Website: Official website

The Wheeler-Thanhauser Orchid Collection and Species Bank is located within Christy Woods, an 17-acre (73,000 m^{2}) property located on the southwest corner of the Ball State University campus in Muncie, Indiana, United States. The collection was donated to Ball State (then) Teachers College in 1971 by Goldie Wheeler.

== History ==
In 2014, the Dr. Joe and Alice Rinard Orchid Greenhouse opened after a $1.35 million new construction to house the Wheeler-Thanhauser Orchid Collection. The building was mostly funded by Joe Rinard. The greenhouse is named after Rinard and his wife, Alice.

== Greenhouse and Education ==
The greenhouse has the orchid collection, tropical displays, animal exhibits and more. It is 3,600 square feet in size. The greenhouse holds over 2,000 orchids and some other tropical plants. It is open the public, and is free of charge.

== See also ==
- List of botanical gardens and arboretums in Indiana
