= Purdue University Horticulture Gardens =

Botanical gardens in West Lafayette, Indiana, U.S.

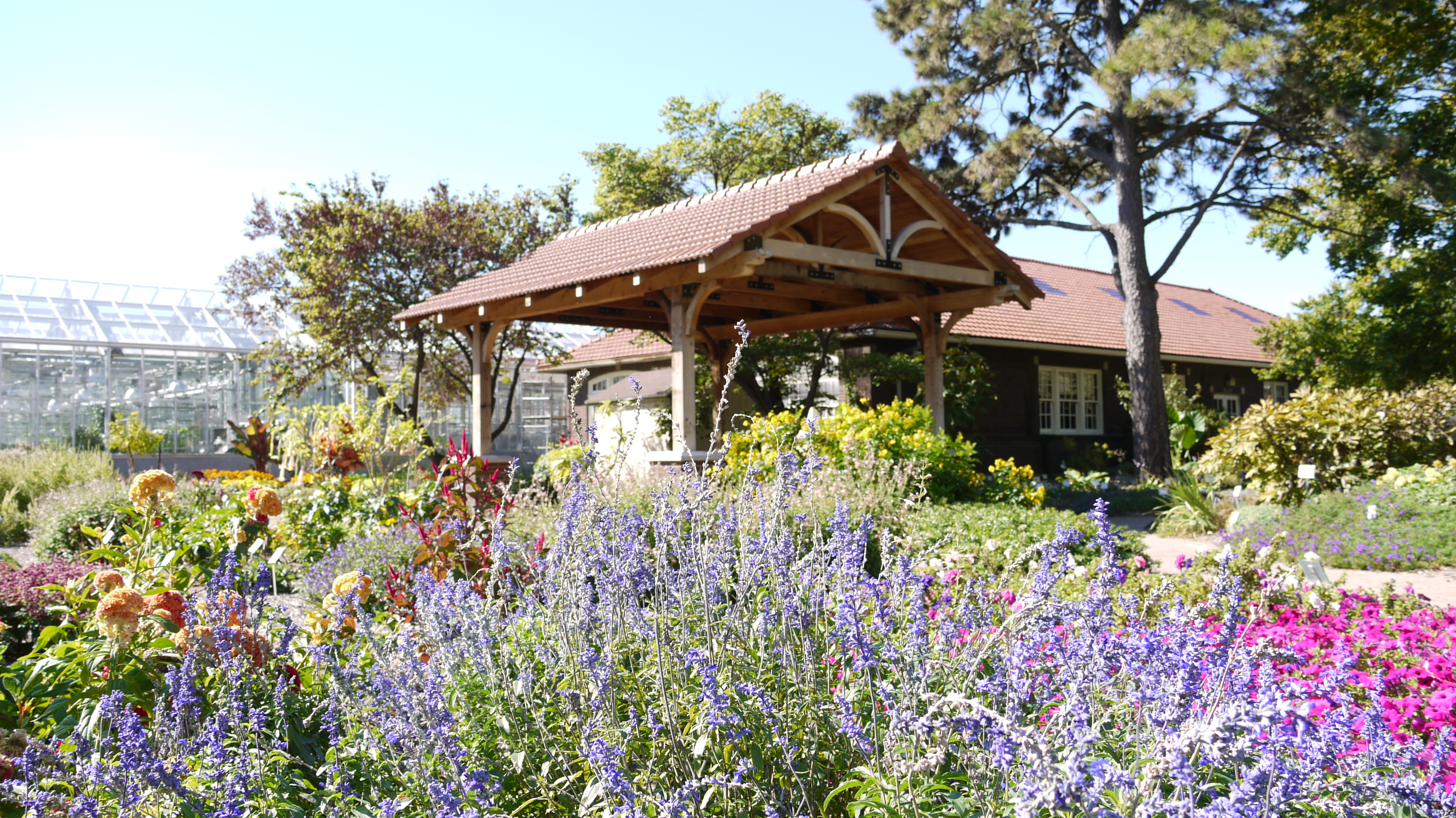
- Purdue Horticulture Gardens, Fall 2010
- Interactive map of Purdue University Horticulture Gardens
- Type: Botanical garden
- Location: Purdue University
- Nearest city: West Lafayette, Indiana
- Coordinates: 40°25′17.47″N 86°54′50.61″W
- Area: 0.5 acres (0.20 ha)
- Created: 1982
- Operator: Purdue University
- Open: Year-round; Donations accepted
- Website: Official website

The Purdue University Horticulture Gardens are botanical gardens at Purdue University in West Lafayette, Indiana in the United States.

== History ==
The gardens were founded in 1982. In 2019, following substantial improvements to the garden, it was named in honor of internationally renowned horticulturist and Purdue Distinguished Professor Jules Janick. Today, the garden is maintained by Purdue University Horticulture Department and Master Gardens students and volunteers. The gardens are financially supported by the Friends of the Gardens.

== Gardens ==
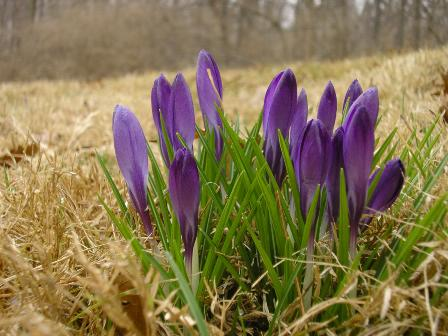
Flowers blooming at the gardens.

The gardens are located onsite at Purdue University's Horticulture Building. The garden features vegetables, perennials and annuals.

The most notable collections on display are ornamental grasses, bulbs, hostas, peonies and daylilies.

In total, there are over 300 cultivars and 200 perennial species on display.

=== Exhibitions ===
There is a pavilion made of cedar which features temporary exhibitions designed by students. Today, visitors can take self-guided and guided tours, including a walking tour that documents the over 100 types of trees growing within and beyond the confines of the gardens, on campus.

=== Special events ===
The annual Purdue Garden Day Open House features special garden tours and events.

== See also ==
- List of botanical gardens and arboretums in Indiana
