= Jerry E. Clegg Botanic Garden =

Botanical garden in Lafayette, Indiana, U.S.

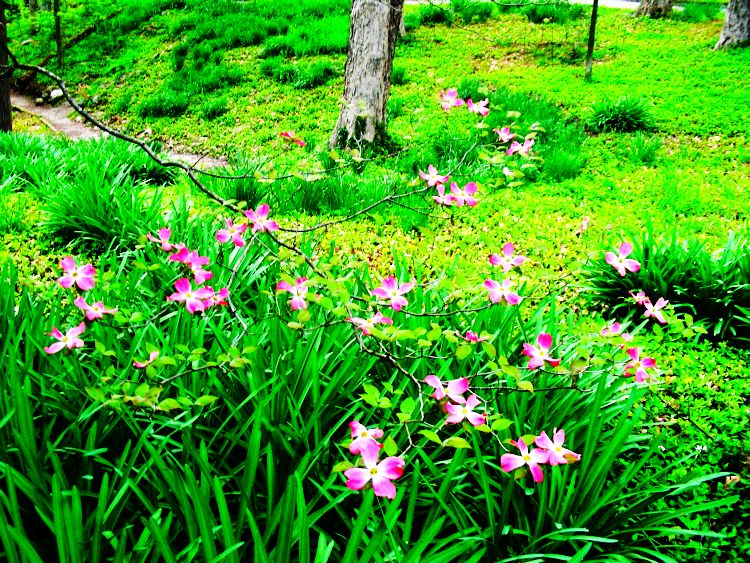
- Jerry Clegg botanical gardens
- Interactive map of Jerry E. Clegg Botanic Garden
- Type: Botanical garden
- Location: 1782 North 400 East
- Nearest city: Lafayette, Indiana
- Coordinates: 40°26′40″N 86°49′42″W
- Operator: Niches Land Trust
- Status: Open

The Jerry E. Clegg Botanic Garden (also called the Clegg Memorial Garden) is a botanical garden in Lafayette, Indiana in the United States.

The garden is next to Wildcat Creek. It has prairie and oak savanna environs. Plants in the garden are native Indiana flora. The main goal of the park is to reintroduce native plants and animals to the Lafayette area.

== See also ==
- List of botanical gardens and arboretums in Indiana
