= Wellfield Botanic Gardens =

Botanic gardens in Elkhart, Indiana, U.S.

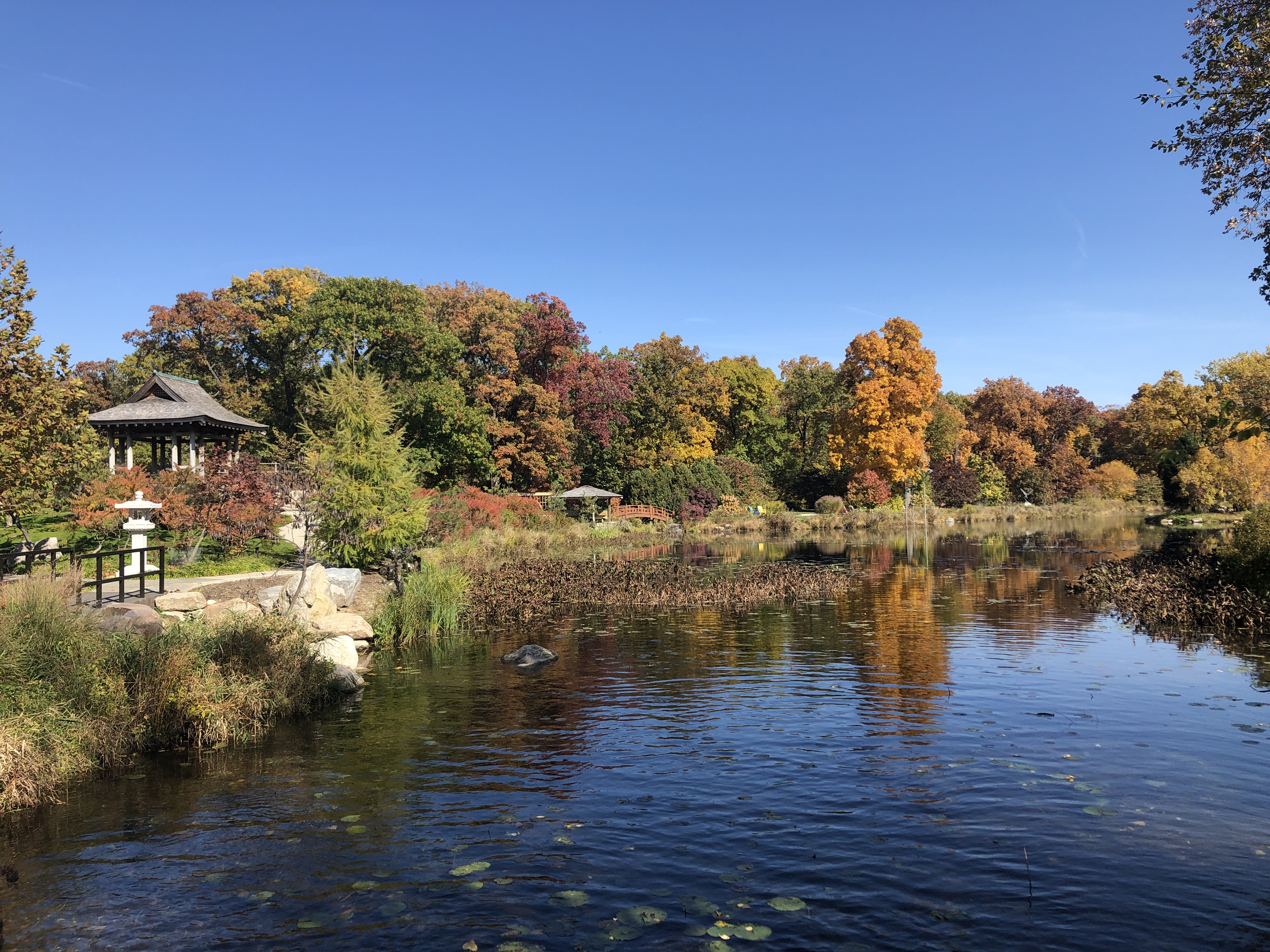
- Wellfield Botanic Gardens in 2022
- Interactive map of Wellfield Botanic Gardens
- Type: Botanic gardens
- Location: Elkhart, Indiana, U.S.
- Coordinates: 41°41′47″N 85°58′48″W
- Area: 36 acres (15 ha)
- Established: 2005
- Administrator: Wellfield Botanic Gardens Board of Directors
- Open: Open year-round, hours vary seasonally
- Parking: Vehicle and bike parking available
- Website: Official website

Wellfield Botanic Gardens, located in Elkhart, Indiana, United States, is a 36 acres (15 ha) botanical garden and a working source of hydropower and drinking water. It is a 501(c)3 not-for-profit organization funded by private donations, earned revenue, memberships, and grants.

== Main Street Well Field History ==
A source of drinking water since at least 1885, the Main Street Well Field site was constructed in the early 1900s and serves as the primary water supply for Elkhart residents.

Groundwater contamination resulting from industrial manufacturing runoff was identified at the site in 1981. Over the following decade, Superfund measures were put in place to correct these issues to the satisfaction of the EPA and state authorities. There are currently 15 active wells that continue to be monitored.

== Wellfield Botanic Gardens History ==
In 2002, the Rotary Club of Elkhart conceived of the gardens as a community service project to celebrate the 100th anniversary of Rotary International. Modeled after the Frederik Meijer Gardens & Sculpture Park in Grand Rapids, Michigan, the goal was to create a community asset that served locals and tourists alike, preserving the natural habitat and contributing positively to the local economy.

The project was officially handed over to the Wellfield Botanic Gardens Board of Directors in 2005 and construction began in 2006. Budgeted at approximately $11 million, construction was planned to take place in 7 phases over 10 years.

The well field land remains the property of the City of Elkhart, and Wellfield Botanic Gardens signed a 99-year lease in 2005 to operate the not-for-profit botanic garden.

== Garden Collections ==
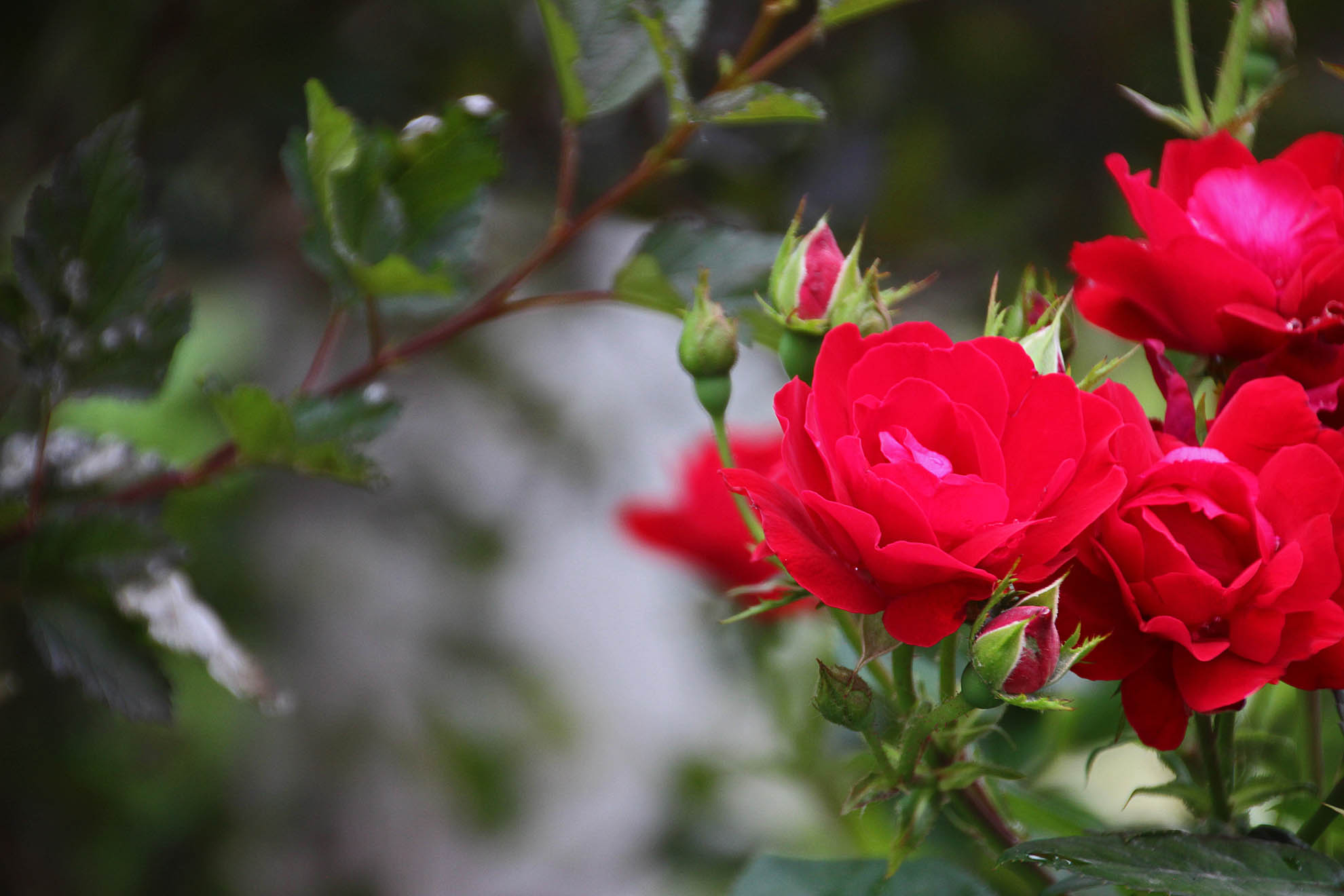

Wellfield Botanic Gardens features over 20 individual gardens including an English-style garden, a waterfall garden, and an "Adventure Path" for children.

The Conversation Garden includes memorial pavers that can be purchased in memory of a loved one or to commemorate a special event.

The Quilt Garden is updated yearly with flowerbeds and greenery designed to represent a quilt square. It is one of 17 quilt gardens in the northern Indiana Amish Country Heritage Trail.

The Japanese-style Island Garden, opened in fall 2019, was constructed under the guidance of Japanese garden expert Sadafumi Uchiyama and features boulders weighing up to 16,000 pounds (7,300 kg).

== Events ==
Wellfield Botanic Gardens now hosts numerous events throughout the year including a yearly Plant Sale, Groovin' in the Gardens (a summer concert series), Taste of the Gardens (a community fundraiser), and Winter Wonderland Holiday Lights (a winter holiday light show).

Throughout all seasons, the Gardens host health and wellness classes such as Yoga and Tai Chi, horticulture classes such as Tree Talks, and art classes in partnership with the Elkhart Art League.

== See also ==
- List of botanical gardens and arboretums in Indiana
