= Gabis Arboretum at Purdue Northwest =

Arboretum in Valparaiso, Indiana, U.S.

- Interactive map of Gabis Arboretum at Purdue Northwest
- Location: 450 West 100 North
- Nearest city: Valparaiso, Indiana
- Coordinates: 41°26′56.15″N 87°9′11.98″W
- Area: 360 acres (150 ha)
- Created: 1998
- Open: 7 days a week
- Website: Official website

Gabis Arboretum at Purdue Northwest is a nature preserve near Valparaiso, Indiana in the United States. The preserve has the largest collection of oak trees in Indiana and an award-winning garden railway.

== History ==
In 1990, Damien Gabis, and a group of other environmentally concerned citizens, purchased 72 acres of land in order to preserve the prairie land of the region. They built a house on the property and Gabis and others lived onsite. Eventually, the property expanded to 360 acres and in 1998 Gabis founded what was originally known as Taltree Arboretum. The original site had only 15 trees on site. Over time, Gabis and his colleagues planted 20,000 trees.

In December 2017 the Gabis family announced that Purdue University Northwest would assume operation of the arboretum, with the name change and management effective January 31, 2018.

Gabis has a performance stage called The Sidetrack which features educational lectures and musical performances. In 2011, Gabis was named one of ten arboreta in the United States that "may well leave you speechless" by MSN. In 2014, the preserve hosted its first OAKtoberfest, a one-day beer festival that showcased beer and cider aged in oak barrels and paired with food.

== Arboretum and gardens ==
The total land for the arboretum and gardens is 360 acres. The property includes a prairie, woodlands, wetlands, savanna, and plant collections and display gardens. The arboretum has oak trees and an exhibit of oak trees from around the world. It is the largest collection of oak trees in Indiana. The display gardens include viburnums, conifer and Japanese maples. Native plants found in Indiana are on display in the Joseph E. Meyer Memorial Pavilion Garden and in the Native Plant Garden. Roses and flowering trees are on display in the Audrey and Leonard Hitz Family Rose Garden.

There is a garden railway onsite, which comprises a 2.5 acre G scale model railroad intertwined with plants. First installed in 2011, there are eight different railroads, totaling 3,000 feet of track, within the garden and up to nine different dioramas which tell the story of Railroads in the United States. The garden railway has over 500 plants varietals and 850 tons of limestone. The garden has a 14-foot elevation change and over 3,500 plants. Visitors are able to view the installation of the railroad each spring by Gabis staff.

== Management ==
The preserve is operated by volunteers and maintained with private donations.

== See also ==
- List of botanical gardens and arboretums in Indiana
