= Brincka Cross Gardens =

County park in Porter County, Indiana, United States

Coordinates: 41°39′33.12″N 86°59′6″W

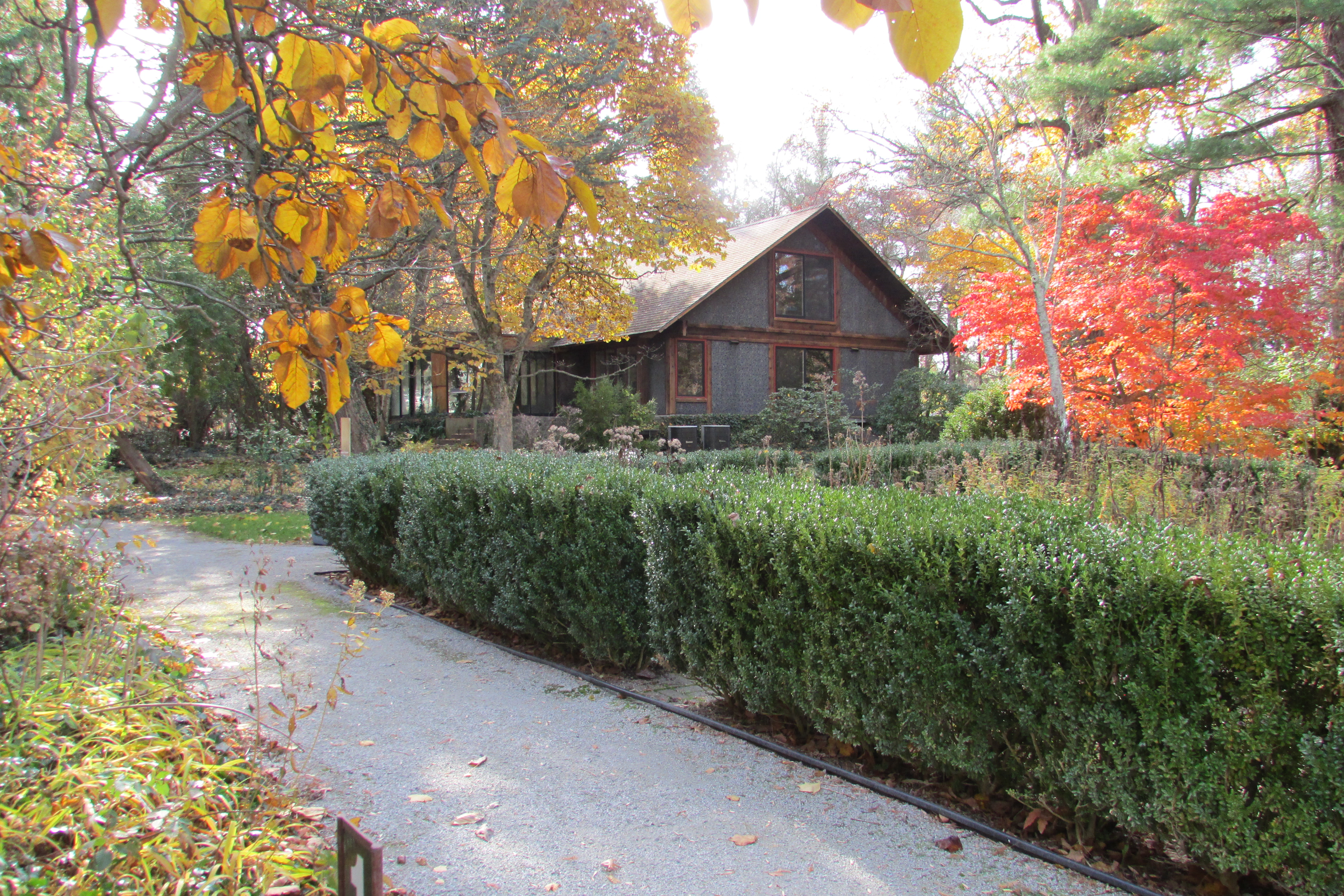
- Interactive map of Brincka Cross Gardens
- Website: Official website

The Brincka Cross Gardens are a 61-acre complex of land parcels located adjacent to the Indiana Dunes National Park and the Town of Pines, a suburb of Michigan City. It is owned and operated by the county park bureau, Porter County Parks.

== Description ==
The Brincka Cross Gardens have, at their heart, a 25-acre land parcel formerly owned and operated by amateur landscape architects Bill Brincka and Basil Cross. Brincka and Cross developed the land as four acres of landscaped gardens and 21 acres of sand-dune forest. To this parcel has been added the adjacent 36-acre Smith tract, creating the resource's current size of 61 acres. Around the garden, 57 acres is managed as habitat space. The Brincka Cross home is used for events numbering up to 40 people. Built in 1969 to a design approved by Brincka and Cross, the house shows Japanese influences and the inspiration of Prairie Style architect Frank Lloyd Wright.

=== Seasons ===
In early spring, the Gardens specialize in daffodils, with approximately 450 varieties producing up to 10,000 blooms. In mid-spring 25 varieties of crabapples flower, and in summer the focus changes to 400 varieties of hosta plants.

== See also ==
- List of botanical gardens and arboretums in Indiana
