= Evansville Courier & Press =

Daily newspaper published in Evansville, Indiana

Courier & Press

- Front page of The Evansville Courier dated August 8, 1945, featuring the aftermath of the atomic bombing of Hiroshima, Japan.
- Type: Daily newspaper
- Format: Broadsheet
- Owner: USA Today Co.
- Editor-in-chief: Ryan Reynolds
- Founded: 1845: Evansville Courier (to 1998); 1906:Evansville Press (to 1998); 1999: Evansville Courier & Press
- Language: English
- Headquarters: 300 E. Walnut St. Evansville, Indiana 47713; United States
- Circulation: 30,000 Monday-Saturday; 50,000 Sunday
- ISSN: 1559-1581
- OCLC number: 40845313
- Website: courierpress.com

The Evansville Courier & Press is an American daily newspaper based in Evansville, Indiana. It serves about 30,000 daily and 50,000 Sunday readers.

== History ==
The Evansville Courier was founded in 1845 by William Newton, a young attorney. Its first issue was printed two years before the city had a charter. The Evansville Press was founded in 1906 by Edward W. Scripps as an afternoon daily.

Both papers were separate and fierce competitors until 1937, when the Evansville Press was flooded and the Evansville Courier agreed to print their competitor's paper. In 1938, the two papers formed a joint operating agreement to handle business affairs. The two papers retained separate staffs and editorial policies, but published a joint Sunday edition with two editorial pages from the two papers.

The E. W. Scripps Company sold the Press and bought the Courier in 1986. The joint Sunday edition was replaced by a Sunday edition of the Courier. The two newspapers continued to publish separate editions until the Evansville Press was discontinued as a separate newspaper on December 31, 1998. The Courier was renamed the Courier & Press on January 1, 1999.

In 2015, the newspaper was purchased by Gannett.

In March 2022, the Courier & Press moved to a six-day printing schedule, eliminating its printed Saturday edition.

== Notable contributors ==
- Karl Kae Knecht, cartoonist and photographer
- Edward J. Meeman, began his journalism career at the Evansville Press as a $4 a week cub reporter; later edited the Memphis Press-Scimitar and encouraged environmental reporting
