= Sunken Gardens (Huntington, Indiana) =

Historic public park and garden complex located in Huntington, Indiana, United States

- U.S. National Register of Historic Places
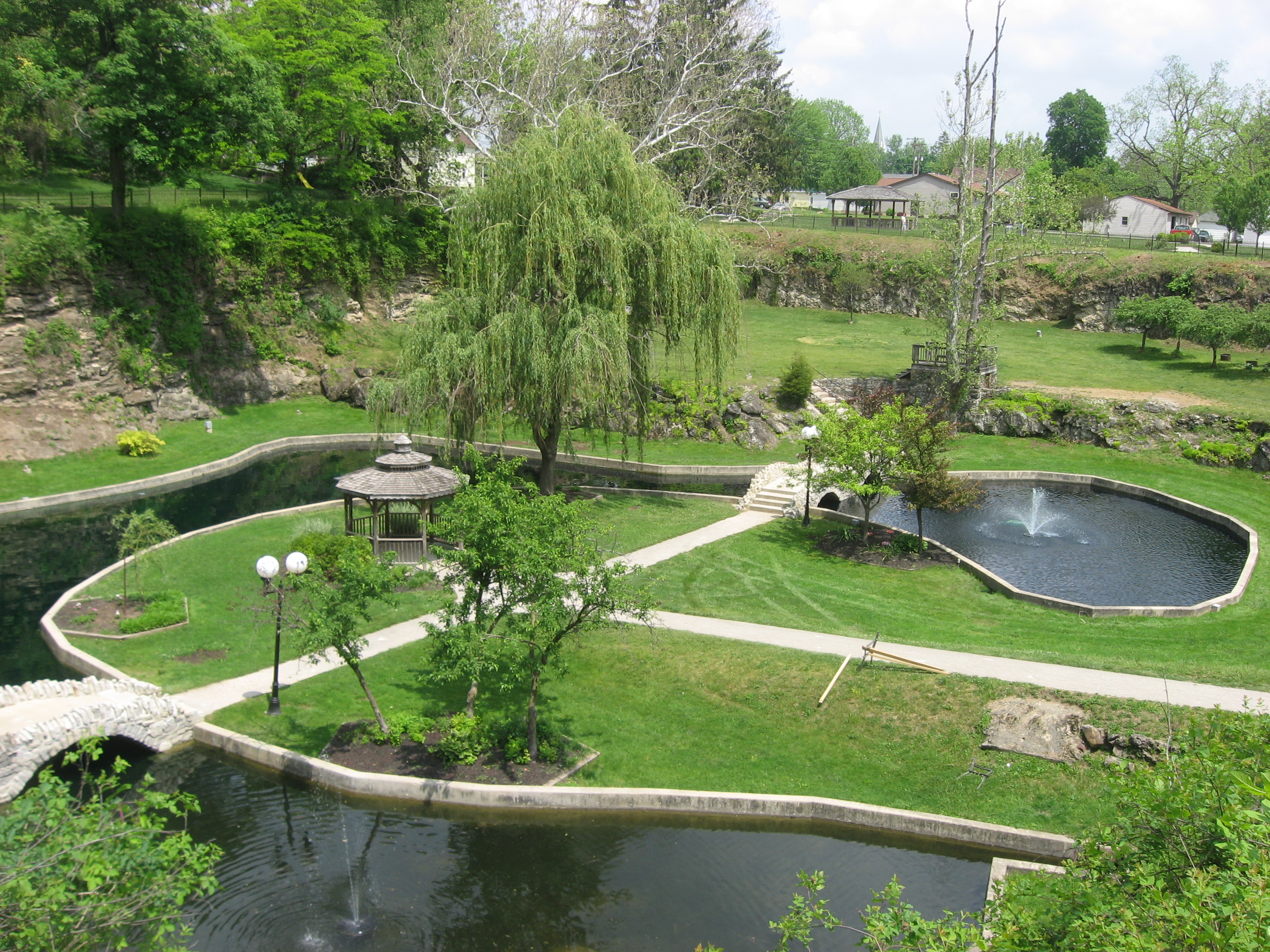
- Sunken Gardens, May 2012

- Location within Indiana Location within the United States
- Location: West Park Dr., southwest of the junction of U.S. Route 24 and La Fontaine St., Huntington, Indiana
- Coordinates: 40°52′44″N 85°30′22″W
- Area: 1.5 acres (0.61 ha)
- Built: 1923-1929
- Architect: Chicago Landscape Co.; Koch, Martin
- NRHP reference No.: 97000596
- Added to NRHP: June 26, 1997

Sunken Gardens is a historic public park and garden complex located at Huntington, Indiana. It was designed by the Chicago Landscape Co. in 1923, and completed in 1929. The gardens include outcropped limestone walls on all sides, a horseshoe shaped pool, limestone foot bridges, two levels, and an automobile-related fieldstone bridge.

It was listed on the National Register of Historic Places in 1997.

== See also ==
- List of botanical gardens and arboretums in Indiana
