= Hayes Arboretum =

Arboretum in Richmond, Indiana, U.S.

Coordinates: 39.8371°N 84.8438°W

- Interactive map of Hayes Arboretum
- Type: Arboretum
- Location: Richmond, Indiana
- Created: June 1915
- Operator: Stanley W. Hayes Research Foundation
- Open: Tue-Sat, 9AM-5PM
- Website: Official website

The Hayes Arboretum is an arboretum of 330 acres (130 ha) located in Richmond, Indiana, United States. The main (west) entrance is open free to the public Tuesdays through Saturdays, 9:00 A.M. to 5:00 P.M., while the east entrance, which provides access to both hiking and mountain biking trails, is open daily from dawn to dusk. It is the primary project of the Stanley W. Hayes Research Foundation, a private operating foundation. The Foundation owns a total of 466 acres (189 ha) of property in Wayne County, IN.

== Description ==
The Arboretum is an educational facility and a managed nature preserve, collecting native wild plants indigenous to Wayne county and the Whitewater Valley Drainage Basin (an area encompassing 14 counties in west-central Ohio and east-central Indiana). It had claimed to include 172 species of trees, plants and shrubs native to the basin, but a 2007 study actually found 525 species. It also contains a renovated 1833 dairy barn, Beech-Maple Trail (3/4 mile), Habitat Trail (1 mile), Springhouse Trail (1/4 mile), and History Trail (1 mile).

The Arboretum was first established in June 1915 when Stanley Wolcott Hayes began purchasing tracts of land to preserve the local old growth Beech-Maple Forest. He began reforesting the land, planting thousands of native trees and creating experimental plots, hoping to restore the land as when the first pioneers arrived. His estate, now Hayes Arboretum, includes:

- Beech-maple forest — trees up to 450 years old. Approximately 60 acres (240,000 m^{2}) of old-growth forest are located within the Arboretum grounds.
- Oak-Tulip Experiment — White Oaks and Tulip trees, planted in 1922–23 as an experiment in hardwood reforestation.
- Mabelle Hayes Fern Garden — an under story of dogwoods in this area, with a fern garden featuring ferns and their allies native to the Whitewater River valley, including 20 species that have been naturalized along the trail with a variety of spring flowers. A few of the ferns are evergreen and in evidence all year long.
- Paul C. McClure Native Woody Plant Preserve — a nature reserve with tree, shrubs, and vines native to the Whitewater Valley Drainage Basin. It serves as an example of how these trees would grow over hundreds of years with plenty of space.
- Hayes Arboretum and Waterworks Mounds — two mounds attributed to the Adena and the Hopewell people are located on the East Side of the property. Excavated by James Heilman from 1965 to 1966, multiple artifacts were discovered inside each of the mounds, including tools, bones, and stone points.

Although not native to the Arboretum, the Arboretum includes the geology collection of a former Earlham College professor Dan Kinsey, who donated his collection in 1968. It contains at least one example of every type of rock native to Indiana.

== Hayes Family Museum ==
A small historic gas station that was moved to the site has been restored for use as a museum documenting the history of the Hayes Family and the Hayes Track Appliance Company.

== Nature Center ==
An 1833 dairy barn houses the arboretum's nature center, which includes information and interpretive displays about trees, native woods, flora and fauna. The building also contains a bird watching room, a live honey bee exhibit, and a sensory room full of natural objects and live specimens. Many programs are offered about regional plants, wildlife, and other nature related topics. Restrooms and a drinking fountain are located inside the Nature Center.

== See also ==
- List of botanical gardens and arboretums in Indiana
