= Scott Sunken Garden =

Historic landmark

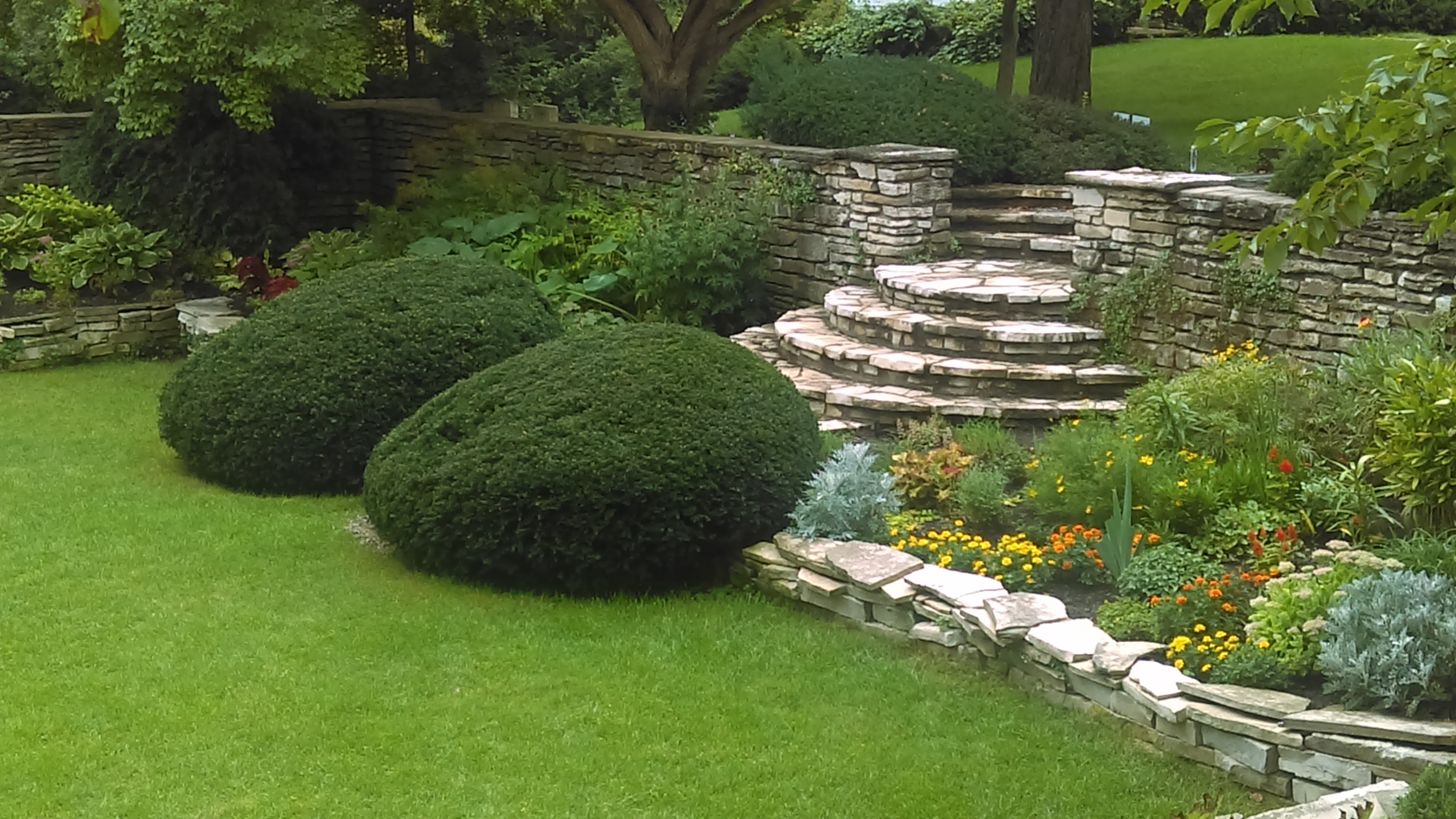
- Scott Sunken Garden
- Interactive map of Scott Sunken Garden
- 42.7251498°N 84.5532807°W
- Type: Historical Landmark
- Location: Lansing, Michigan

History
- Built: 1930

Site notes
- Area: REO Town
- Restored: May 1985
- Restored by: Greater Lansing Garden Club
- Governing body: City of Lansing
- Owner: City of Lansing

Scott Sunken Garden is a historical landmark in Lansing, Michigan, United States of America.

The outer foundation walls are 51 feet by 79 feet, and the center is a 28-by-45-foot (8.5 by 13.7 m) lawn. There are shorter limestone walls lining the court with raised flower beds. The west and east sides have limestone steps leading to a small pond below the grotto centerpiece. The foundation of Justice Edward Cahill's home was redesigned after 1930 by the American immigrant Nick Kriek. The gardening includes bulbs, annuals, perennials, and a list of species introduced to the area by Kriek himself. The Greater Lansing Garden Club has maintained the garden for three decades; they restored it after a few decades of neglect by the city.

The Scott Sunken Garden landmark has a list of historically significant ties, including the 1930s "Golden Age of American Landscaping", Immigration, Civil Rights, and Lansing's Beautification.

== Recognition ==
The National Register Coordinator for the State of Michigan states that the Scott Sunken Garden is eligible for listing in the National Register of Historic Places.... The garden appears to meet national register criteria B and C...."

== History ==
"Even though the Scott House itself – the house that stood just west of the garden near the Jenison House/Scott Center – that formed the central feature of the property no longer exists, the garden stands out as a fine example of formal landscape garden design from the early twentieth century (various dates of construction from the mid-1920s to 1934-35 have been reported). As far as I've been able to determine from all the recent discussions, the garden is unique in Lansing as a formal garden that, designed for an urban residential setting, dates from the early twentieth century period when landscaped gardens and estates associated with them reached a height of design perfection, during what has been called the "Golden Age of American Landscape Design." The Scott Sunken Garden, in my mind, possesses additional significance as a prime achievement of a local Lansing artisan, Nicolaas Isaac Willem Kriek. Kriek (1895–1978) was born in the Netherlands and, settling in Lansing in the early 1920s, founded the Cottage Gardens nursery in 1923. Bill Hicks, Mr. Kriek's grandson and today part of the still operating family-owned business, states that Nick Kriek built the Sunken Garden for Scott, from whom he had purchased the property on which the Cottage Gardens nursery was established in 1923. It seems logical to think that Kriek had a major hand in designing the garden to meet the Scotts' wishes and requirements. The garden also possesses importance for its direct association with an important Lansing citizen, Richard H. Scott, who owned the property and had the garden created. Marilyn Lee's 2010 history of the garden states that Scott came to Lansing in 1898 to work for auto pioneer R. E. Olds and helped organize Olds' Reo Motor Car Company and served as president of the company after Olds retired in 1923."

This Scott Sunken Garden foundation is presumed to be the remains of Justice Edward Cahill's home in Lansing. He moved to Lansing after serving in the Civil War beside African American soldiers in Michigan's 102nd USCI. Justice Edward Cahill served on the Michigan Supreme Court in 1890. Justice Cahill also concurred upholding Racial equality in the landmark "William W. Ferguson vs. Edward G. Gies" case.

The local chapter of this national garden club has a long history with both the Scott Sunken Garden and the Scott Center. The club met at the Scott Center before it was moved to Scott Park, and the Garden Club invested in the restoration of the garden through the early 1980s. Financing from the city fell short of original expectations, and the Garden Club paid for a restoration of the lower wall of the Scott Sunken Garden.

== Politics ==
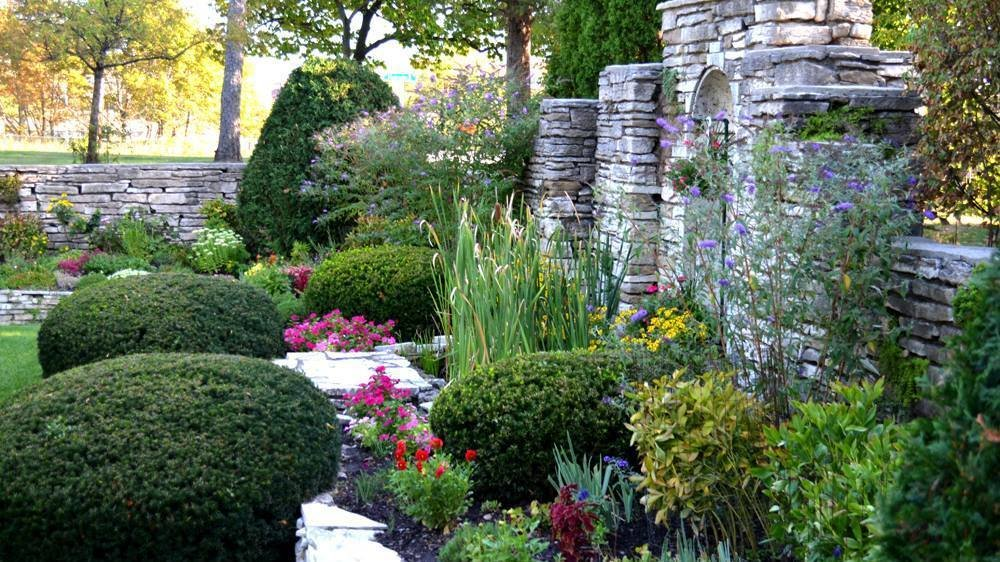
The Garden's limestone walls

The city needs widespread upgrades to the power grid infrastructure, including replacing several substations and the older Eckert Substation next to the Eckert Power Station. The Lansing Board of Water and Light (LBWL) and Mayor Virg Bernero have pushed for a large central substation in their proposal to destroy a riverside park (Scott Park) and to remove the historical integrity of its landmark, the Scott Sunken Garden.

=== LBWL proposals ===
The LBWL had submitted an original proposal to Lansing Parks and Recreation, which it then amended during the Lansing Planning Board's review. The mayor appoints these boards, and the Lansing City Council reviews their decisions.

=== Parkland advocacy ===
The Scott Sunken Garden caretakers for three decades, the Greater Lansing Garden Club, have declined the LBWL's offer for the new garden, preferring that the historical garden remain intact. Each public board meeting and the public meeting held by Jessica Yorko (as Lansing City Council, 4th Ward Representative) were occupied with citizen advocates. There are multiple community organizations publicly advocating saving Scott Sunken Garden and its Scott Park; "Preservation Lansing" has advocated this along with a list of other historical concerns in the area; "Friends of Scott Sunken Garden Park" is a non-profit advocacy organization instituted for protecting Scott Sunken Garden and its neighboring assets of the people of Lansing.

==== Public petitions ====
Original petition for Lansing Parks and Recreation: "Save Scott Park and the Sunken Garden".

Request for more ideal alternative and assistance with concerns by officials: "Two Downtown Lansing Substations Audit and Investigation into Concerns by Mayor and LBW."

== See also ==
- American Civil War
- Immigration
- List of National Historic Landmarks in Michigan
