= List of hospitals in Indiana =

The following list of hospitals in the U.S. state of Indiana, sorted by hospital name, is based on data provided by the Indiana State Department of Health.

- Adams Memorial Hospital – Decatur
- Ascension St. Vincent Kokomo- Kokomo, Indiana
- Bedford Regional Medical Center – Bedford
- BHC Valle Vista Hospital – Greenwood
- Bloomington Hospital of Orange County – Paoli
- Bloomington Meadows Hospital – Bloomington
- Bluffton Regional Medical Center – Bluffton
- Cameron Memorial Community Hospital – Angola
- Clark Memorial Health – Jeffersonville
- Columbus Regional Health – Columbus
- Community Hospital – Munster
- Community Hospital East – Indianapolis
- Community Hospital North – Indianapolis
- Community Hospital of Anderson and Madison County – Anderson
- Community Hospital of Bremen – Bremen
- Community Hospital South – Indianapolis
- Community Howard Regional Health – Kokomo
- Community Mental Health Center – Lawrenceburg
- Daviess Community Hospital – Washington
- Deaconess Cross Pointe Center – Evansville
- Deaconess Gateway and Women's Hospital – Newburgh
- Deaconess Hospital – Evansville
- Dearborn County Hospital – Lawrenceburg
- Decatur County Memorial Hospital – Greensburg
- DeKalb Memorial Hospital – Auburn
- Dukes Memorial Hospital – Peru
- Dunn Memorial Hospital – Bedford
- Dupont Hospital – Fort Wayne
- Elkhart General Hospital – Elkhart
- Evansville Psychiatric Children's Center – Evansville
- Fayette Memorial Hospital Association – Connersville
- Floyd Memorial Hospital and Health Services – New Albany
- Four County Counseling Center – Logansport
- Franciscan Health Carmel – Carmel
- Franciscan Health Crawfordsville – Crawfordsville
- Franciscan Health Crown Point – Crown Point
- Franciscan Health Dyer – Dyer
- Franciscan Health Hammond – Hammond
- Franciscan Health Indianapolis – Indianapolis
- Franciscan Health Lafayette Central – Lafayette
- Franciscan Health Lafayette East – Lafayette
- Franciscan Health Michigan City – Michigan City
- Franciscan Health Mooresville – Mooresville
- Franciscan Health Munster – Munster
- Franciscan Health Rensselaer – Rensselaer
- Gibson General Hospital – Princeton
- Good Samaritan Hospital – Vincennes
- Goshen General Hospital – Goshen
- Grant-Blackford Mental Health – Marion
- Greene County General Hospital – Linton
- Hamilton Center – Terre Haute
- Hancock Regional Hospital – Greenfield
- Harrison County Hospital – Corydon
- HealthSouth Deaconess Rehabilitation Hospital – Evansville
- HealthSouth Hospital of Terre Haute – Terre Haute
- Heart Center of Indiana – Indianapolis
- Hendricks Regional Health – Danville
- Henry County Memorial Hospital – New Castle
- Hind General Hospital – Hobart
- Indiana University Health Arnett Hospital – Lafayette
- Indiana University Health Ball Memorial Hospital – Muncie
- Indiana University Health Blackford Hospital – Hartford City
- Indiana University Health Bloomington Hospital – Bloomington
- Indiana University Health Jay Hospital – Portland
- Indiana University Health La Porte Hospital – La Porte
- Indiana University Health Methodist Hospital – Indianapolis
- Indiana University Health North Hospital – Carmel
- Indiana University Health Fishers – Fishers
- Indiana University Health Starke Hospital – Knox
- Indiana University Health Tipton Hospital – Tipton
- Indiana University Health University Hospital – Indianapolis
- Indiana University Health West Hospital – Avon
- Johnson Memorial Hospital – Franklin
- Kindred Hospital – Indianapolis
- King's Daughters Hospital and Health Services – Madison
- Kosciusko Community Hospital – Warsaw
- Larue D. Carter Memorial Hospital – Indianapolis
- Logansport Memorial Hospital – Logansport
- Logansport State Hospital – Logansport
- Lutheran Hospital of Indiana – Fort Wayne
- Madison State Hospital – Madison
- Major Hospital – Shelbyville
- Margaret Mary Community Hospital – Batesville
- Marion General Hospital – Marion
- Medical Behavioral Hospital – Mishawaka – Mishawaka
- Medical Center of Southern Indiana – Charlestown
- Memorial Hospital and Health Care Center – Jasper
- Memorial Hospital of South Bend – South Bend
- Methodist Hospitals – Gary and Merrillville
- Michiana Behavioral Health Center – Plymouth
- Morgan Hospital & Medical Center – Martinsville
- NeuroDiagnostic Institute – Indianapolis
- Northeastern Center – Auburn
- Oaklawn Psychiatric Center – Goshen
- OrthoIndy Hospital – Indianapolis
- Otis R. Bowen Center for Human Services – Warsaw
- Our Lady of Peace Hospital – South Bend
- Parkview Hospital Randallia – Fort Wayne
- Parkview Huntington Hospital – Huntington
- Parkview LaGrange Hospital – LaGrange
- Parkview Noble Hospital – Kendallville
- Parkview Regional Medical Center – Fort Wayne
- Parkview Whitley Hospital – Columbia City
- Perry County Memorial Hospital – Tell City
- Pinnacle Hospital – Crown Point
- Portage Hospital – Portage
- Porter Regional Hospital – Valparaiso
- Pulaski Memorial Hospital – Winamac
- Putnam County Hospital – Greencastle
- Regency Hospital of Northwest Indiana – East Chicago
- Rehabilitation Hospital of Fort Wayne – Fort Wayne
- Rehabilitation Hospital of Indiana – Indianapolis
- Reid Hospital and Health Care Services – Richmond
- Richmond State Hospital – Richmond
- Riley Hospital for Children – Indianapolis
- Riverside Hospital Corporation – South Bend
- Riverview Health Noblesville Hospital – Noblesville
- Riverview Health Westfield Hospital – Westfield
- Rush Memorial Hospital – Rushville
- St. Catherine Hospital – East Chicago
- St. Elizabeth Ann Seton Hospital of Carmel – Carmel
- St. Elizabeth Ann Seton Hospital of Indianapolis – Indianapolis
- St. Elizabeth Ann Seton Hospital of Kokomo – Kokomo
- Saint John's Health System – Anderson
- St. Joseph Hospital – Fort Wayne
- St. Joseph Hospital and Health Center – Kokomo
- St. Joseph Regional Medical Center – Mishawaka
- St. Joseph's Hospital of Huntingburg – Huntingburg
- St. Joseph's Regional Medical Center – Plymouth
- St. Mary Medical Center – Hobart
- St. Mary's Warrick Hospital – Boonville
- St. Vincent Anderson Regional Hospital – Anderson
- St. Vincent Carmel Hospital – Carmel
- St. Vincent Clay Hospital – Brazil
- St. Vincent Evansville – Evansville
- St. Vincent Fishers Hospital – Fishers
- St. Vincent Frankfort Hospital – Frankfort
- St. Vincent Indianapolis Hospital – Indianapolis
- St. Vincent Jennings Hospital – North Vernon
- St. Vincent Mercy Hospital – Elwood
- St. Vincent Pediatric Rehabilitation Center – Indianapolis
- St. Vincent Randolph Hospital – Winchester
- St. Vincent Williamsport Hospital – Williamsport
- Schneck Medical Center – Seymour
- Scott County Memorial Hospital – Scottsburg
- Select Specialty Hospital - Beech Grove – Beech Grove
- Select Specialty Hospital - Bloomington – Bloomington
- Select Specialty Hospital - Evansville – Evansville
- Select Specialty Hospital - Fort Wayne – Fort Wayne
- Select Specialty Hospital - Indianapolis – Indianapolis
- Select Specialty Hospital - Northwest Indiana – Hammond
- Sidney & Lois Eskenazi Hospital – Indianapolis
- Southern Indiana Rehabilitation Hospital – New Albany
- Southlake Center for Mental Health – Merrillville
- Sullivan County Community Hospital – Sullivan
- Terre Haute Regional Hospital – Terre Haute
- Union Hospital – Terre Haute
- Wabash County Hospital – Wabash
- Wabash Valley Hospital – West Lafayette
- Washington County Memorial Hospital – Salem
- Wellstone Regional Hospital – Jeffersonville
- West Central Community Hospital – Clinton
- White County Memorial Hospital – Monticello
- Witham Health Services – Lebanon
- Woodlawn Hospital – Rochester

== See also ==
- List of hospitals in Indianapolis
- Lists of hospitals in the United States
