= List of hospitals in Indianapolis =

This list of hospitals in Indianapolis includes 21 existing and 11 former hospitals located in Indianapolis, Indiana, United States.

Most of the city's medical facilities belong to three private, non-profit hospital networks: Ascension St. Vincent Health, Community Health Network, and Indiana University Health. Many of the city's hospitals are teaching hospitals affiliated with the Indiana University School of Medicine and/or with Marian University's Tom and Julie Wood College of Osteopathic Medicine. Eskenazi Health's flagship Sidney & Lois Eskenazi Hospital serves as the city's public safety net hospital.

== Extant ==
Name	Est.	Location	Network	University affiliate(s)	Former name(s)	Ref.
Community Fairbanks Recovery Center	1945	39.9027°N 86.0409°W	Community Health Network	Indiana University Marian University	Indiana Home for Alcoholic Men; Cornelia Cole Fairbanks Home	
Community Heart and Vascular Hospital	2003	39.9019°N 86.0445°W	Community Health Network	Indiana University Marian University	Indiana Heart Hospital	
Community Hospital East	1956	39.7874°N 86.0754°W	Community Health Network	Indiana University Marian University	Community Hospital	
Community Hospital North	1985	39.9005°N 86.0414°W	Community Health Network	Indiana University Marian University		
Community Hospital South	1989	39.6369°N 86.1326°W	Community Health Network	Indiana University Marian University	University Heights Hospital	
Community Rehabilitation Hospital North	1974	39.8989°N 86.0380°W	Community Health Network	Indiana University Marian University	August J. Hook Rehabilitation Center	
Franciscan Health Indianapolis	1914	39.6489°N 86.0792°W	Franciscan Health	Marian University	St. Francis Hospital; Franciscan St. Francis Hospital	
Kindred Hospital Indianapolis	1993	39.7815°N 86.1914°W	ScionHealth		Vencor Hospital Indianapolis	
Kindred Hospital Indianapolis North		39.9017°N 86.0605°W	ScionHealth			
Methodist Hospital	1908	39.7904°N 86.1629°W	Indiana University Health	Indiana University		
NeuroDiagnostic Institute	2019	39.7883°N 86.0763°W	Indiana Family and Social Services Administration		Larue D. Carter Memorial Hospital	
OrthoIndy Northwest	1962	39.9082°N 86.2671°W	OrthoIndy	Marian University	Indiana Orthopaedic Hospital	
Peyton Manning Children's Hospital	2003	39.9083°N 86.1959°W	Ascension St. Vincent Health	Indiana University Marian University	St. Vincent Children's Hospital	
Rehabilitation Hospital of Indiana	1989	39.8300°N 86.2773°W	Ascension St. Vincent Health; Indiana University Health			
Richard L. Roudebush VA Medical Center	1932	39.7783°N 86.1869°W	Veterans Health Administration	Indiana University Marian University	Indianapolis Veterans Administration Hospital	
Riley Hospital for Children	1924	39.7775°N 86.1799°W	Indiana University Health	Indiana University	James Whitcomb Riley Hospital for Children	
St. Vincent Indianapolis Hospital	1881	39.9098°N 86.1959°W	Ascension St. Vincent Health	Indiana University Marian University	St. Vincent's Infirmary; St. Vincent's Hospital	
St. Vincent Seton Specialty Hospital	1996	39.9016°N 86.2042°W	Ascension St. Vincent Health	Indiana University Marian University	St. Elizabeth Ann Seton Long Term Acute Care Hospital	
St. Vincent Women and Infants Hospital	1983	39.9073°N 86.1959°W	Ascension St. Vincent Health	Indiana University Marian University	Women's Hospital of Indianapolis; St. Vincent Women's Hospital	
Sidney & Lois Eskenazi Hospital	1859	39.7778°N 86.1839°W	Eskenazi Health	Indiana University Marian University	Indianapolis City Hospital; Indianapolis General Hospital; Marion County General Hospital; Wishard Memorial Hospital	
University Hospital	1970	39.7757°N 86.1767°W	Indiana University Health	Indiana University	Indiana University Hospital	

== Defunct ==
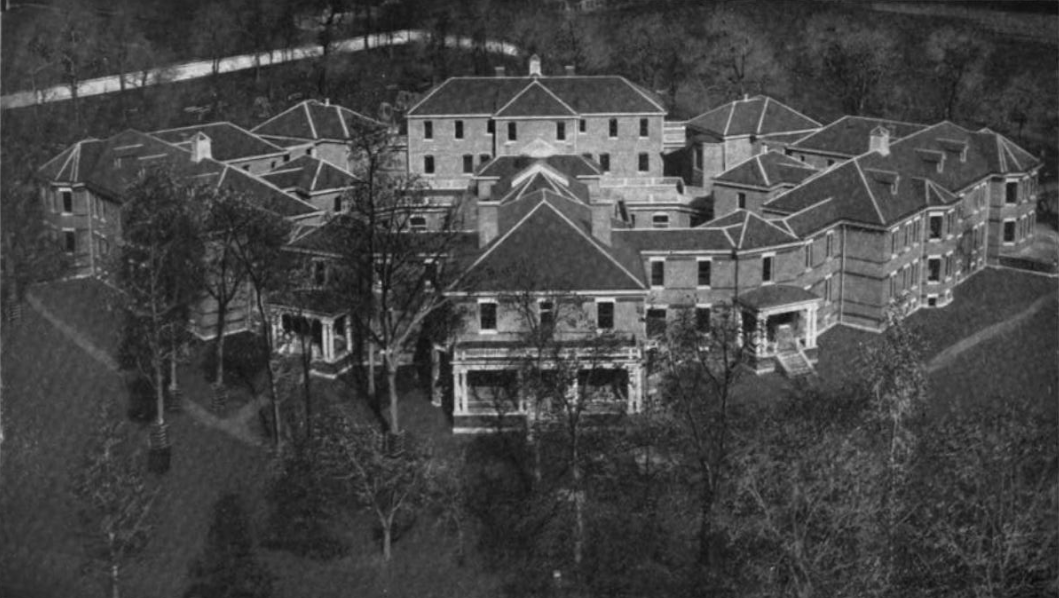
Central Indiana Hospital for the Insane, c. 1903

- Central State Hospital (1848–1994) (Note: Previous names for the institution included the Indiana Hospital for the Insane (1848–1889) and the Central Indiana Hospital for the Insane (1889–1929).)
- Deaconess Hospital and Clinic (1895–1935) (Note: Previous names for the institution included Protestant Deaconess Hospital and Home for the Aged (1895–1932) and Indiana Christian Hospital and Clinic (1932–1933).)
- Eleanor Hospital (1895–1909)
- Lincoln Hospital (1909–1915)
- Marion County Healthcare Center (1832–1996) (Note: Previous names for the institution included the Marion County Poor Farm (1832–1869), the Marion County Infirmary (1869–1899), the Marion County Asylum for the Incurably Insane (1899–1938), the Marion County Home for the Aged (1938–1964), and the Marion County Home and Julietta Convalescent Center (1964–1983).)
- Norways Sanatorium (1898–1957)
- Robert W. Long Hospital (1914–1970)
- Sunnyside Sanatorium (1917–1969)
- Westview Hospital (1975–2016)
- William H. Coleman Hospital for Women (1927–1974)
- Winona Memorial Hospital (1956–2004) (Note: Previous names for the institution included Memorial Clinic (1956–1966) and Midwest Medical Center (1991–1994).)

== See also ==
- List of hospitals in Indiana
