= NeuroDiagnostic Institute =

State psychiatric hospital in Indianapolis, Indiana, U.S.

- Indiana Family and Social Services Administration
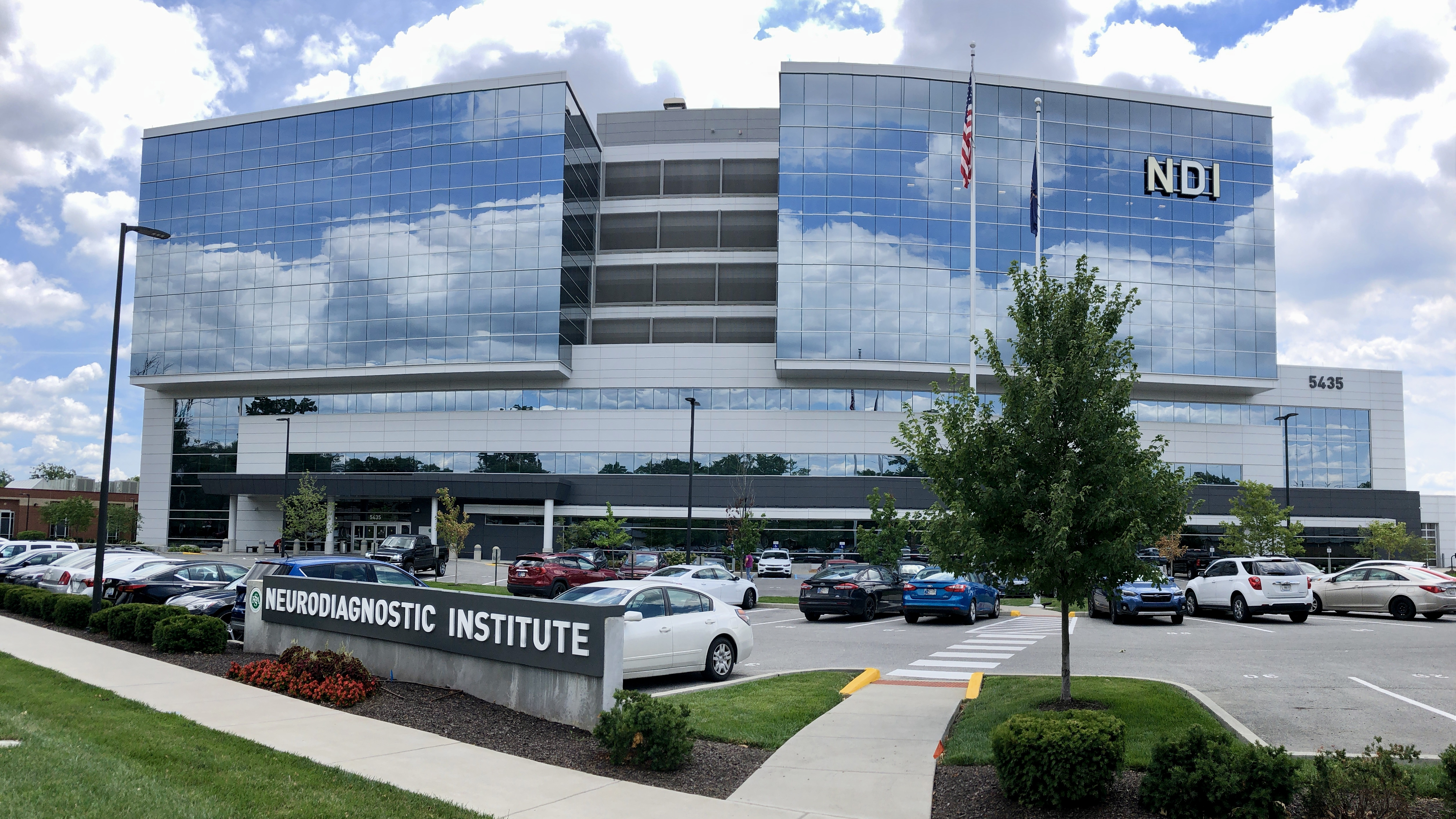
- NeuroDiagnostic Institute from 16th Street in 2022

Geography
- Location: 5435 E. 16th St., Indianapolis, Indiana, United States
- Coordinates: 39°47′18″N 86°4′35″W

Organization
- Type: Psychiatric

Services
- Beds: 159

History
- Founded: 2019

Links
- Website: NeuroDiagnostic Institute
- Lists: Hospitals in Indiana

The NeuroDiagnostic Institute (NDI) is a state psychiatric hospital located in Indianapolis, Indiana, United States. NDI is operated by the State of Indiana Family and Social Services Administration in partnership with the private Community Health Network. The hospital, built on the Community Hospital East campus, opened on March 15, 2019, as Indiana's first new state psychiatric hospital in decades. It replaced the defunct Larue D. Carter Memorial Hospital.

== History ==
NDI was announced in 2015 as the successor to the State's aging Larue D. Carter Memorial Hospital. Compared to Larue, NDI has a larger staff (500 versus 350), more beds for pediatric patients (65 versus 42), and significantly more security cameras. Completed at a cost of $118 million, NDI is designed to serve 1,500 patients annually for acute and chronic mental illness, chronic addictions, adolescent autism spectrum disorders, traumatic brain injuries, and neuro-degenerative illnesses such as Alzheimer’s disease.

== See also ==
- List of hospitals in Indianapolis
