= Colleen Dishon =

American journalist (1924–2004)

- Born: June 12, 1924; Kentucky, US
- Died: December 28, 2004 (aged 80); Memorial Hospital of South Bend, South Bend, Indiana, US
- Other name: Koky Dishon
- Occupation: Journalist
- Employer: Chicago Tribune
- Spouse: Bob Dishon
- Awards: Lifetime Achievement Award, 2001; Journalism Hall of Fame, 1997; Distinguished Service in Journalism, 1979

Colleen Dishon (June 12, 1924 – December 28, 2004), also known as Koky Dishon, was an American journalist for the Chicago Tribune in Chicago, Illinois, United States. Dishon was the first woman listed in the Chicago Tribune masthead and, at one time, the most influential female journalist at the newspaper.

== Early and personal life ==
Dishon was born prematurely, in a rural cabin in Kentucky, on June 12, 1924. She grew up in Zanesville, Ohio with her mother and five siblings. Dishon met her husband, Bob Dishon, while they worked for the Columbus Dispatch. They both eventually quit their jobs there and began working at the Daily News in Chicago, Illinois. Bob was a city desk reporter and Koky was in feature sections there. Colleen and Bob worked closely together and were allies in the workplace. Bob and Koky were married 54 years, when Koky died on December 28, 2004, aged 80, in the Memorial Hospital of South Bend.

== Career ==
In summer 1941, she got her first job at her town's newspaper after suggestion from her mother. "I cleaned myself up and walked into town," she said. "I had no idea where I was going. When I stopped, I was at a building where the Zanesville newspapers were published. I didn't know a soul there, but I walked up the stairs and stood in the doorway and told the editor 'I want to work', and they gave me an old typewriter in the back of the room and told me to do the baby column." In 1975, Dishon was hired by the Chicago Tribune to change the Tempo section into a general features section in the newspaper. While revamping the section, she changed the Tempo heading to "closed for remodeling." That is when Dishon created Tempo Women, a column aimed at working women. "There was nothing in the paper that showed (women) they weren't alone in their struggle, that others were in the same boat," she said. The very successful column's final version was named Womenews to appeal to working women under the age of 35. Womanews was distributed to the two million readers of the Chicago Tribune's Sunday paper. In seven years, Koky was promoted to associate editor, making her the first woman on the Chicago Tribune masthead. She maintained control of all departments outside of news and sports. Koky Dishon retired from the Chicago Tribune in 1994, at 70 years old. James D. Squires, the editor who had promoted her, said, "There have been two great creative people at the Chicago Tribune. The first was Col. (Robert) McCormick who put together a world-recognized newspaper, and the second was Koky Dishon who created sections people wanted to read." The Tribune Managing Editor, Ann Marie Lipinski, stated, " Whether you have ever worked for Koky, or ever heard her name before today, if you are a newspaper reader, you are the beneficiary of her genius. She defined modern features coverage with her work in Chicago, creating the so-called 'sectional revolution' in American newspapers."

After her retirement, Koky contributed to the industry by becoming an editorial consultant at a weekly newspaper by Network Chicago WTTW public television. She has also helped the South Bend Tribune, in Indiana, in transitioning from an evening to morning publication. She also co-authored a book on the designing of newspapers sections.

Colleen Dishon worked for the Chicago Tribune in Chicago, Illinois, shown here relative to the capital Washington, D.C.

== Impact ==
When Koky Dishon worked for the Chicago Tribune, she influenced the newspaper so much that they called it the "sectional revolution." She combined real news and flare to the article, making it fun and appealing to the readers. When Dishon was hired, she thought the news columns were stylistically stodgy and out of date. She created the Tempo section into more of a general interest section, bringing in more male readers. "She may have been the most innovative soft news editor in my generation," says former Tribune editor James Squires, "I don't know anyone who led more changes than Koky Dishon. She was a fireball of a person who went forward every day with happiness and drive. I never saw her not smiling and having a good time." There are scholarships in Dishon's name for journalism students across America. The Ohio University foundation received a $850,000 donation from the estate of Koky and Bob Dishon. "The generous endowment will allow us to award highly competitive scholarships to a number of journalism students," the Dean of Scripps College of Communication, Gregory J. Shepherd said, "I am very grateful to Bob and Koky Dishon for establishing this living legacy." From this scholarship, an incoming freshman pursuing a journalism major will be given $8,000.

== Awards ==
- Distinguished Service in Journalism (1979) – Dishon received this award from Ohio State University for 17 sections she created at the Chicago Tribune that revolutionized how newspaper sections were produced.
- Journalism Hall of Fame (1997)
- Lifetime Achievement Award (2001) – Awarded to Dishon for her career "spent in joyful defiance of boxes and the range of restrictions that so long defined women's work in journalism."
- Milwaukee Press Club Hall of Fame (2002) – Dishon was inducted into the Milwaukee Press Club Hall of Fame in 2002, awarded to honor the men and women who shaped and changed journalism in the region.

== See also ==
- International Women's Media Foundation
