= IOH =

IOH may mean:

- I/O Hub, an Intel chipset architecture
- Improved Order of Heptasophs, a fraternal organization
- Indiana Orthopaedic Hospital
- Indosat Ooredoo Hutchison, an Indonesian telecommunications company
- Infinity on High, a 2007 album by Fall Out Boy
- Initial Orthostatic Hypotension, a medical condition
- United States Army Institute of Heraldry
