= St. Vincent Evansville =

Ascension St. Vincent Evansville
- St. Vincent Health

Geography
- Location: Evansville, Indiana, United States
- Coordinates: 37°57′52.8″N 87°30′16.1″W

Organization
- Type: General

Services
- Emergency department: Level II trauma center

History
- Former names: St. Mary's Hospital and Medical Center, St. Vincent Evansville

Links
- Website: healthcare.ascension.org/Locations/Indiana/INEVA/Evansville-Ascension-St-Vincent-Evansville/
- Lists: Hospitals in Indiana

Ascension St. Vincent Evansville (formerly St. Mary's Hospital and Medical Center) is the flagship hospital of a health system in the Illinois–Indiana–Kentucky tri-state area located in Evansville, Indiana and is a level II trauma center. The system was started in 1872 and was formerly known as St. Mary's Health. St. Mary's Health was integrated into St. Vincent Health in 2012 to create one statewide, integrated healthcare ministry, with the name change effective in 2017. St. Vincent Health is a part of Ascension Health, the nation's largest nonprofit health system and the world's largest Catholic health system.

== Awards ==
Ascension St. Vincent Evansville has three times (2011, 2016 and 2021) received Magnet Designation from the American Nurses Credentialing Center.
