= Ethical and Religious Directives for Catholic Health Care Services =

1971 US healthcare policy document

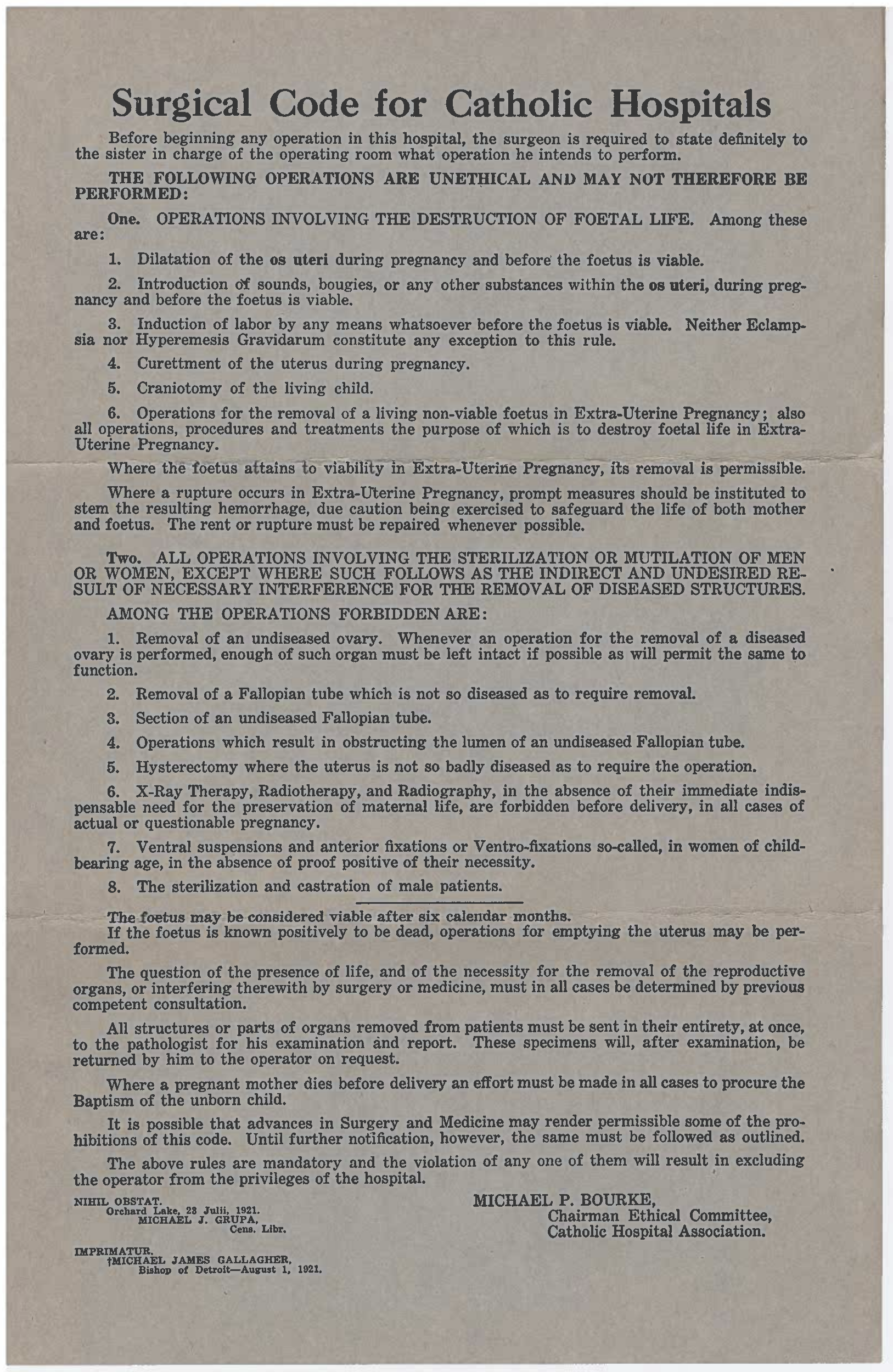
- The original 1921 poster
- Author: United States Conference of Catholic Bishops
- Language: English
- Publication date: 1921 (1st ed); 1971 (4th ed); 2025 (7th ed)
- Publication place: United States
- Pages: 30
- LC Class: RA975.C37 E85

Ethical and Religious Directives for Catholic Health Care Services (ERDs) is a publication that sets policy in Catholic hospitals and health systems. The document is written and published by the United States Conference of Catholic Bishops. The document derives medical and healthcare policy from Catholic theology and church teaching.

The document in its current form dates from 1971, with the most recent edition published 2025.

== Publication history ==
In the 19th and early 20th centuries, religious rules for Catholic hospitals were published by various local and regional entities in America. An early example was published by the Archdiocese of Detroit in 1921, prohibiting abortion and sterilization. This document was a single-page poster. It was copied by other archdioceses, sometimes with modifications. These posters hung on operating room walls in American and Canadian Catholic hospitals in the early 20th century.

The Catholic Hospital Association began work on a uniform set of rules in the 1940s. But, no rules became official for a particular hospital or location until approved and interpreted by local religious authorities.

Publication was centralized by the Conference of Catholic Bishops in 1971 to avoid different rules in different places, which was derided as "geographical morality." The new rules resulted in "a storm of violent criticism" that the rules were inapplicable to a pluralistic society and beyond the scope of what the bishops should teach. A report by the Catholic Theological Society of America found the Ethical and Religious Directives to be legalistic, inapplicable to concrete situations, and inferior to the Canadian Medico-Moral Guide. The report strongly disagreed that local bishops should possess "sole ultimate authority" to evaluate the morality of new scientific developments, and called for less attention to sex and reproduction.

Cardinal John Krol persuaded most American bishops to adopt the controversial 1971 document because of the legalization of abortion in Roe v. Wade in 1973 and Taylor v. St. Vincent's Hospital, a lawsuit by a woman seeking tubal ligation, in 1975. A revision in the 1990s is considered less legalistic than the 1970s document, containing more theological and philosophical explanations for its conclusions. At this time, publication ceased to be attributed to the Catholic Hospital Association and changed instead to the Committee on Doctrine of the Conference of Catholic Bishops.

The document is considered to be in its seventh edition, which dates from 2025, although previous editions had different titles and publishers. The most recent edition prohibits gender-affirming care at Catholic hospitals. The Catholic Bishops voted to begin the process of banning gender-affirming care in 2023. They view the transgender medical treatments as "not morally justified."

=== Editions ===
The document's seven editions are as follows:

Edition	Title	Year	Publisher
1	Surgical Code for Catholic Hospitals	1921	Archdiocese of Detroit
2	Ethical and Religious Directives for Catholic Hospitals	1948	Catholic Hospital Association
3	Ethical and Religious Directives for Catholic Hospitals	1956	Catholic Hospital Association
4	Ethical and Religious Directives for Catholic Health Care Facilities	1971	Catholic Hospital Association
5	Ethical and Religious Directives for Catholic Health Care Services	1994	National Conference of Catholic Bishops
6	Ethical and Religious Directives for Catholic Health Care Services	2001	National Conference of Catholic Bishops
7	Ethical and Religious Directives for Catholic Health Care Services	2025	National Conference of Catholic Bishops

== Directives ==
The Ethical and Religious Directives contains 49 directives within the document's six sections, many of which lay out rules that Catholic healthcare providers must follow. Notable rules include the following:

=== Allowed or required ===
- Service and advocacy in particular to "people whose social condition puts them at the margins of our society" including the poor, the uninsured, and "the unborn".
- Equal opportunity employment. Employees must be treated "respectfully and justly."
- Canon law of the Church must be followed by Catholic healthcare providers.
- Eucharist and other Catholic sacraments must be available to, and only to, Catholic patients.

=== Prohibited ===
A number of the directives that prohibit medical procedures — namely abortion, euthanasia, and sterilization — specify that the procedure is prohibited only when "directly intended." This is because of the principle of double effect, a Catholic teaching.

- Abortion is "never permitted." Health care providers are directed to council women who have suffered "the trauma of abortion." The document reiterates that abortion is prohibited in the case of extrauterine pregnancy. Nor may a victim of sexual assault get an abortion, nor may she interfere "with the implantation of a fertilized ovum."
- Sterilization is prohibited. This prohibits tubal ligation and vasectomies.
- Contraception or birth control is prohibited. Instruction on "natural family planning" may be given to married couples only. Contraception is only prescribed to treat health problems, not for the purpose of preventing pregnancy.
- Euthanasia or assisted suicide are not allowed. A person has a moral obligation to keep on living, though they "may forgo extraordinary or disproportionate means of preserving life."
- Advance directives that are contrary to Catholic teaching are prohibited. Catholic institutions must make information about advance directives available in compliance with federal law.
- Infertility treatment is permitted only within marriage, and only as long as it does not "substitute for the marriage act." For example, fertilization via sperm donor and in vitro fertilization are prohibited, as is surrogate motherhood.

== Impact ==
The ERDs apply in 600 Catholic general hospitals across the United States. Approximately 100 more hospitals are managed by Catholic chains that place religious limits on care.

They have had more impact over time as the healthcare industry consolidates and Catholic hospitals expand. The Directives state that "whatever comes under control of the Catholic institution — whether by acquisition, governance, or management — must be operated in full accord with the moral teaching of the Catholic Church."

The directives prohibit common reproductive health services. Some Catholic hospitals are literal in their application of the rules, while others are less restrictive in their interpretation. A number employ workarounds to provide patient care.

=== Enforcement ===
Within each hospital, the directives are enforced by ethics committees made up of clinical, religious, legal, and administrative members. Hospital ethics committees consult on medical questions, act as gatekeepers of ERD-restricted treatments, and sometimes perform surveillance of medical practices.

Bishops have some power to enforce the prohibitions in the ERDs, but they lack the power to enforce the guarantees of care in the ERDs. For example, the ERDs statement that "a Catholic health care institution should provide prenatal, obstetric, and postnatal services" proved unenforceable when the largest Catholic hospital chain, Ascension, closed down many of its obstetric facilities. Charles Bouchard, a former director of the Catholic Health Association and vice president of theological education at Ascension, explained this limitation of the bishops' power: "They can keep hospitals from doing something if it's seen as at odds with Catholic teaching. But they can't, unless they're going to pay for it, they can't go out and say, 'you've got to keep this hospital open.'"

== Fit with medical standards ==
The Ethical and Religious Directives are often at odds with accepted medical standards, especially in areas of reproductive health. For example, guidelines of American College of Obstetricians and Gynecologists (ACOG) specify conditions under which women should be offered the option of an abortion.

=== Nonviable and life-threatening pregnancy ===
At the time the Ethical and Religious Directives were first written, doctors in Catholic hospitals were not allowed to intervene in anything theologians considered a natural part of the reproductive process, even if deadly, such as ectopic pregnancy. A 1919 medical ethics textbook by Austin O'Malley explains: "If the mother cannot be saved without emptying the uterus, the mother must die; there is no way out of the difficulty."

This absolute prohibition of abortion, even in life-threatening cases, is still included in the ERDs. In practice, there has been an increase over time in the number of exceptions allowed as "indirect" abortions or otherwise overlooked. This is particularly evident for ectopic pregnancy:

- In 1922 doctors were advised they may take action on an ectopic pregnancy when "the hemorrhage has become so profuse that the woman's life is endangered and the abortion inevitable," at which point the fetus could no longer survive and the fallopian tube had become pathological, justifying its surgical removal.
- At least as late as the 1990s some Catholic hospitals removed the entire fallopian tube to treat ectopic pregnancy, although this was often medically unnecessary. According to the Catholic Medical Association, removing the entire tube is still the only morally permissible surgical treatment for ectopic pregnancy when the embryo is alive, and then only if the tube is "damaged." However, this directive is routinely ignored today.
- "Today, it seems Catholic hospitals quietly allow methotrexate" to treat ectopic pregnancy, according to sociologist Lori Freedman. Methotrexate, which causes abortion, is ACOG's current standard of care for medical management of tubal ectopic pregnancy. Catholic directives prohibiting methotrexate are ignored by hospitals because they are too far out of step with current practice to survive malpractice lawsuits. Although the ERDs and the Catholic Medical Association officially prohibit this use of methotrexate, the Catholic Health Association website says that methotrexate is acceptable.

Kyleigh Thurman filed a complaint with the Department of Health and Human Services claiming that, in February 2023, Catholic institution Ascension Seton Williamson Hospital refused to treat her ectopic pregnancy or to transfer her to another hospital; she was instead discharged. She says the hospital again denied her treatment when she returned with vaginal bleeding, days later, a delay which caused her fallopian tube to rupture. In national study of obstetrician-gynecologists in 2012, 5.5% of respondents at Catholic institutions reported that their options for treating ectopic pregnancy are constrained by their hospitals.

=== Sexual assault ===
Emergency contraceptives are the standard of care for rape victims. Whether the ERDs contradict this standard is subject to different interpretations by different diocesan bishops. Some Catholic hospitals have policies prohibiting emergency room physicians from prescribing emergency contraceptives, or even from discussing them, while others do not. Some staff use "creative solutions" to circumvent emergency contraception prohibitions and meet the standard of care.

The interpretation of the Catholic Medical Association rejects all emergency contraception after sexual assault, totally prohibiting Levonorgestrel (Plan B), Ulipristal acetate (Ella), insertion of an IUD, and all other measures a woman might use to avoid pregnancy after rape.
