= Deaconess Health System =

Organisation
- Network: Deaconess Health System

History
- Founded: 1892

Links
- Website: www.deaconess.com

Deaconess Health System is one of the largest health care networks in the Illinois–Indiana–Kentucky tri-state area. It serves a total of 26 counties and consists of nine hospitals within Southern Indiana and two hospitals in Kentucky.

== History ==
Deaconess was founded in 1892 by a group of Protestant ministers and laymen in a small house on 604 Mary Street, Evansville, Indiana, as a 19-bed hospital. In 1897 the house was moved to the back of the lot. A new building was constructed on the corner and opened in 1899.

In 1922, a four-story addition was built and further construction in 1948 added new administrative offices and two nursing units. The hospital expansion and transformation continued through the 1960s and 1970s to its present-day form.

In October 2022, Deaconess took over four Southern Illinois facilities and hospitals. The facilities included Heartland Regional Medical Center in Marion, Illinois, Red Bud Regional Hospital in Red Bud, Illinois, Crossroads Community Hospital in Mt. Vernon, Illinois, and Union County Hospital in Anna, Illinois.

In 2023, Deaconess partnered to utilize a Health Catalyst, Inc. enterprise analytics and outcomes which work to improve clinical, operational, and financial domains for the overall health system. In February, Deaconess announced that Memorial Hospital was to be an affiliate of Deaconess. Deaconess started to utilize new artificial intelligence at their command center in August. The system was brought on by Jeff Terry, the CEO for GE-Healthcare, who created this technology to further healthcare for Deaconess.

== Hospitals ==
Deaconess Midtown Hospital is the flagship hospital located on the original site of the Protestant Deaconess Hospital built in 1899. In 1920, an additional floor and wing was added to the hospital. However, in 1970, the original hospital was demolished so other buildings could be built. It is the largest hospital within the health system and is a Level II trauma center.

Deaconess Gateway Hospital was built in 2006. It is located in the Newburgh, Indiana, and serves the eastern side of Evansville, Indiana. Its campus houses three other specialty hospitals: The Women's Hospital, The Heart Hospital, and The Orthopedic and Neuroscience Hospital.

Deaconess Cross Pointe provides health care services for emotional, behavioral, and addiction-related needs.

Encompass Health Deaconess Rehabilitation Hospital, in Newburgh, and the Encompass Health Deaconess Rehabilitation Hospital-Midtown, located in Evansville, provide inpatient rehabilitation.

The Linda E. White Hospice House is located in Evansville.

Deaconess Hospital in Evansville was rated #2 in Indiana by U.S Health News.

Deaconess Health System also has affiliations with other hospitals in Illinois - Lawrence County Memorial Hospital and Ferrell Hospital - and a joint venture with another hospital in Kentucky - Baptist Health Deaconess Hospital Madisonville.

| Hospital | City, County | Number of Beds |
|---|---|---|
| Deaconess Midtown Hospital | Evansville, Vanderburgh County, Indiana | 350 |
| Deaconess Gateway Hospital | Newburgh, Warrick County, Indiana | 200 |
| Deaconess Henderson Hospital | Henderson, Henderson County, Kentucky | 192 |
| Deaconess Gibson Hospital | Princeton, Gibson County, Indiana | 25 |
| Deaconess Union County Hospital | Morganfield, Union County, Kentucky | 25 |
