= Austin O'Malley =

Austin O'Malley may refer to:

- Austin O'Malley (Gaelic footballer)
- Austin O'Malley (author)
