= Dupont Hospital =

Hospital in Fort Wayne, Indiana, U.S.

Coordinates: 41°10′30.9″N 85°6′35″W

- Lutheran Health Network
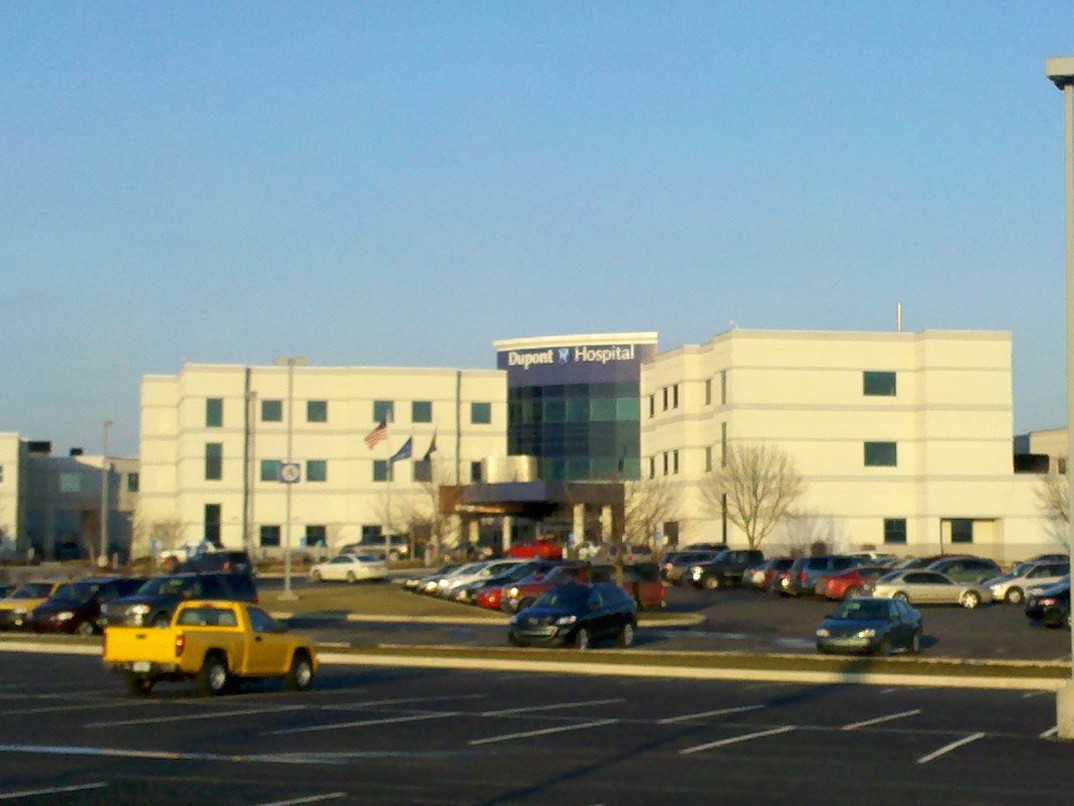

Geography
- Location: 2520 East Dupont Road, Fort Wayne, Indiana, United States

Organization
- Care system: Public
- Type: Community

Services
- Beds: 131

History
- Founded: April 2001

Links
- Website: http://www.theduponthospital.com/
- Lists: Hospitals in Indiana

Dupont Hospital is a 131-bed acute care facility located in Fort Wayne, Indiana. The hospital was opened in 2001 as a joint venture between the Lutheran Health Network and is staffed by more than 260 physicians.

The hospital includes the Dupont Resource Center, which offers lectures, screenings, counseling, and support groups.

== Services ==
Dupont has 13 operating rooms, three endoscopy rooms, two C-section rooms, a special procedures room, a 10-bed ICU, and a Level III NICU. The hospital also has 64-slice and 16-slice CT scanners.

Dupont provides 24/7 emergency services by board-certified physicians. This hospital is rated #83 overall for hospitals in Indiana.

Centers within the hospital campus include the Ambulatory Surgery Center, the Dupont Center for Sleep Health, and Birthplace. The Ambulatory Surgery Center is a facility for scheduled surgeries. Emergency surgeries and outpatient surgeries are performed in the main hospital. The Sleep Health Center performs sleep studies. Birthplace includes 12 Labor, Delivery, and Recovery Rooms, 14 NICU Beds, 27 Postpartum Rooms, a 20 Bed Nursery, and a dedicated Maternity entrance and a private elevator that leads to the labor/Delivery Unit.
