= Lutheran Hospital of Indiana =

Hospital in Fort Wayne, Indiana, U.S.

Coordinates: 41°2′19.9″N 85°14′59.9″W

Lutheran Hospital
- Lutheran Health Network
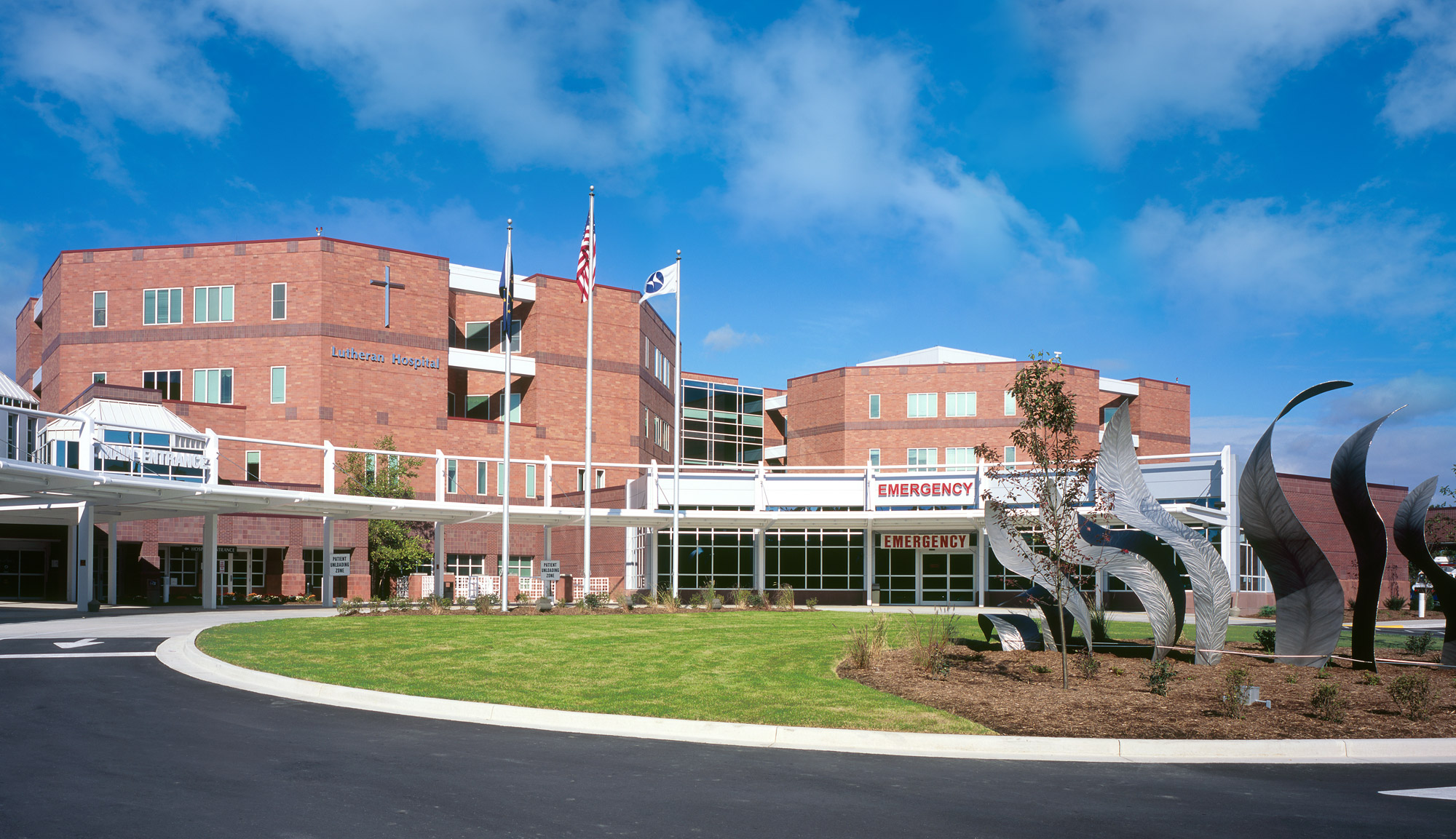
- Lutheran Hospital

Geography
- Location: 7950 West Jefferson Boulevard, Fort Wayne, Indiana, US

Organisation
- Care system: Public
- Type: Community

Services
- Emergency department: II
- Beds: 396

History
- Founded: November 1904

Links
- Website: http://www.lutheranhospital.com

The Lutheran Hospital of Indiana, commonly known as Lutheran Hospital, is a medical facility in Fort Wayne, Indiana.

== History ==
At the beginning of the 20th century, local Lutheran church leaders in Fort Wayne felt an urgent need for an additional hospital in the city. Led by Reverend Philip Wambsganss, they raised funds from the surrounding area, in 1904, the 25-bed Lutheran Hospital opened.

The hospital was sold in 1995, with the proceeds forming The Lutheran Foundation which continues promote community wellness through its support of regional organizations, churches, and schools.

== Overview ==
Lutheran Hospital is a tertiary-care facility serving northeastern Indiana, northwestern Ohio and southern Michigan. Lutheran is the region's only heart and kidney transplant center. In addition, Lutheran Children's Hospital offers pediatric inpatient and intensive care units and the most pediatric subspecialties in the region. Lutheran Hospital added a fifth floor which opened in late 2011.

Lutheran Hospital is a member of the Lutheran Health Network, owned by Community Health Systems.

== Services ==
- Cardiac Intensive Care Unit
- Cardiovascular Intensive Care Unit
- Childbirth Suites & Neonatal
- Intensive Care Unit
- Critical Care Transport (Lutheran Air and Mobile Intensive Care Unit)
- ECMO (adult)
- ER (Level II Trauma)
- Hyperbaric Medicine
- Inpatient and Outpatient Surgery
- Interventional Stroke Care
- Lutheran Cancer Center
- Lutheran Cancer Resource Center
- Lutheran Children's Hospital
- Lutheran Health Network Bariatric Center
- Lutheran Health Network Diabetes Services
- Neuro ICU
- Nutrition Therapy
- Outpatient Rehabilitation
- Radiology and Lab Services (including outpatient)
- Sleep Disorders Center
- Tobacco Intervention Program
- Transplant Center- Heart
- Ventricular Assist Device implant (Destination Therapy & Bridge to Transplant)
- Weight Management Center
