= Deaconess Gateway and Women's Hospital =

Deaconess Gateway Hospital

Geography
- Location: 4011 Gateway Boulevard, Newburgh, Indiana, United States
- Coordinates: 37.974633°N 87.444888°W

Links
- Lists: Hospitals in Indiana

Deaconess Gateway Hospital, The Women's Hospital, and The Heart Hospital are all part of the Deaconess Gateway Campus of the Deaconess Health System Located on Gateway Blvd in Newburgh, near Interstate 164, this health care campus offers acute care, women's health care, heart care, pediatric care, cancer treatment, and radiology and imaging. Since 2017, the hospital has served as the main campus for the Deaconess Health System, due to both its much larger size than Midtown Hospital, and its location at the junction of Interstate 69 and the Lloyd Expressway, providing ease of access to most of the surrounding region.
