= Parkview Health =

Nonprofit healthcare system in Indiana, U.S.

Coordinates: 41°5′43.42″N 85°6′36.19″W

Geography
- Location: 10501 Corporate Dr., Fort Wayne, Indiana, United States

Organization
- Care system: Public
- Type: Community

Services
- Emergency department: Level II trauma center certification

History
- Opened: October 19, 1878

Links
- Website: www.parkview.com
- Lists: Hospitals in Indiana

Parkview Health, founded in 1878 as Fort Wayne City Hospital, is a network of 15 community hospitals and nearly 300 physician offices in northeast Indiana and northwest Ohio. Parkview Health is a not-for-profit healthcare system and the region's largest employer, with more than 16,000 employees. Parkview Physicians Group is also part of the Parkview Health, and includes nearly 1,200 providers in more than 45 specialties.

== History ==
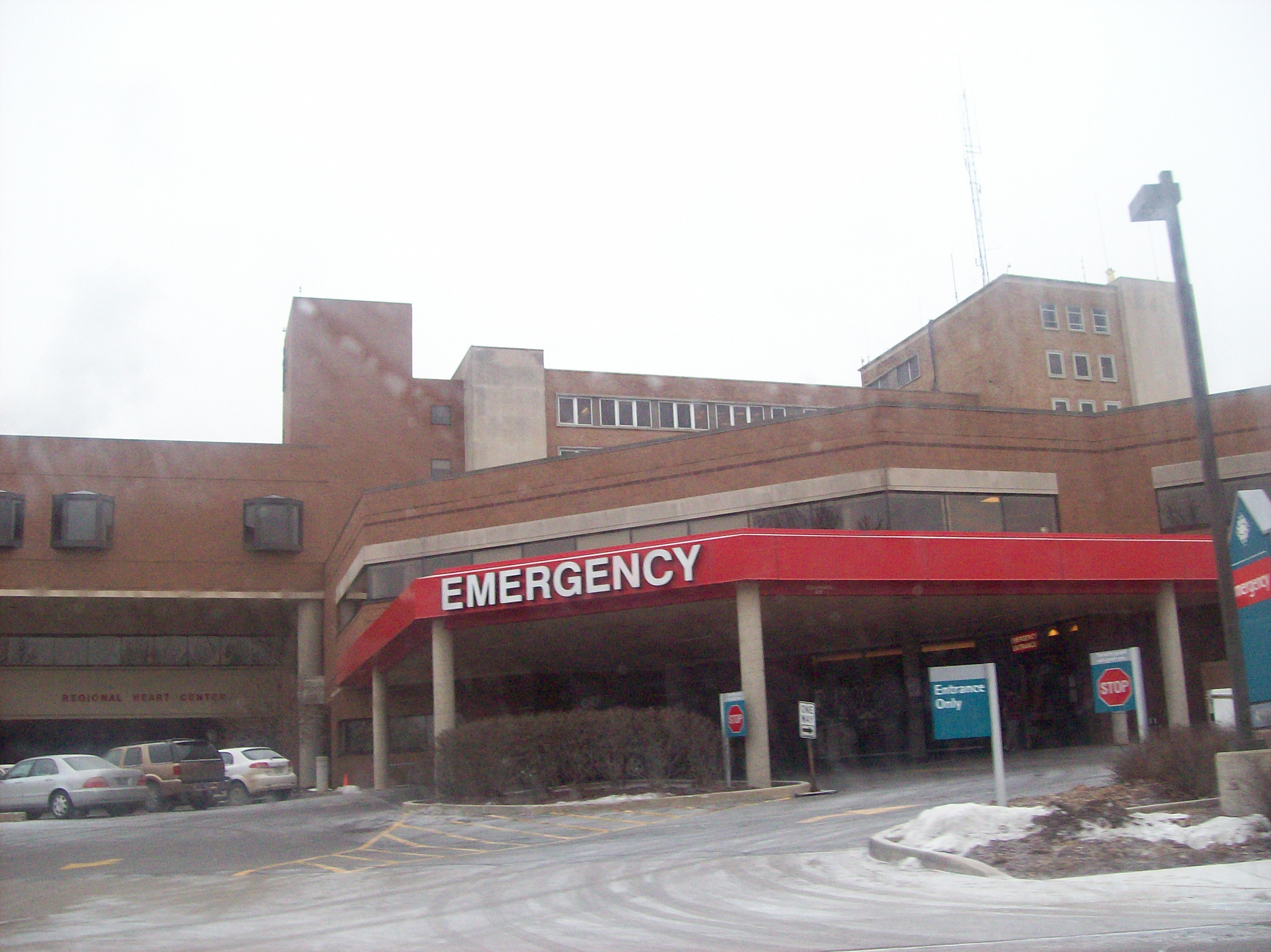
A Parkview operated hospital in Fort Wayne, Indiana

Parkview Health traces its roots back to Fort Wayne City Hospital, founded in 1878. Subsequent hospitals in Parkview's history include Hope Hospital (1891–1922), Methodist Hospital (1922–1953), Parkview Memorial Hospital (1953–1955) and Parkview Hospital (1955–). Parkview Health System, Inc. was incorporated in May 1995.

As of 2024, Parkview has acquired six former rival hospitals in the Fort Wayne area. Parkview Whitley and Parkview Huntington Hospitals joined the system in 1995, Parkview Noble Hospital in 2000, Parkview LaGrange Hospital in 2005, Parkview Wabash Hospital in 2015, Parkview DeKalb Hospital in 2019. In 2023, it also acquired three Ohio facilities—Parkview Bryan Hospital, Parkview Montpelier Hospital and Parkview Archbold. Parkview Health's flagship hospital campus, Parkview Regional Medical Center, was founded in March 2012. Parkview had 14 hospitals total within its network as of 2023.

As of 2013, Parkview officials announced a facelift of $3.2 million to Parkview Randallia Hospital. It includes a new entryway, new signage, a large courtyard, and a park. An interior facelift was conducted right after the Parkview Regional Medical Center was complete in May 2012, which included turning 150 patient rooms into private, more comfortable rooms. Other highlights include acute and continuing care centers, a surgery area, the Center for Wound Healing, Center on Aging and Health and a full-service emergency department. The facility also offers a family birthing center, imaging and lab services, endoscopy, and a sleep lab. In January 2024, Parkview Kosciusko Hospital opened after a project that expanded the existing outpatient center in Warsaw into a full-service hospital.

Since 2019, Parkview has generated more than $2 billion in annual revenue.

Michael Packnett served as CEO of Parkview from 2006 until his retirement at the end of 2022; Packnett's compensation from Parkview for 2019 was $3.8 million. Rick Henvey succeeded Packnett as CEO on 1 January 2023.

== Graduate medical education ==
In March 2021, Parkview Health launched a graduate medical education program to attract, train and retain physicians in northeast Indiana. The residency program is a clinical training program for doctors who have graduated from medical school and are ready to receive further specialized training. Parkview's program is based at Parkview Hospital Randallia and includes internal medicine, a three-year program open to 15 residents each year, and general surgery, a five-year program open to four residents each year.

== Awards and recognition ==
Two Parkview hospitals were awarded an "A" in the spring 2021 Leapfrog Hospital Safety Grade. The College of Healthcare Information Management Executives (CHIME) awarded Parkview Health its 2020 Digital Health Most Wired recognition. Parkview Health was ranked as #171 in a list of America's 500 Best Employers by Forbes magazine in 2019.

== Billing practices ==
A 2019 report found that Parkview charged private insurance about four times the rate it charged Medicare.

Additionally, the hospital has refused to bill Medicaid for some of its patients even when they qualified, instead placing medical liens directly on patients' property for rates three to five times as high as the Medicaid rate, potentially ruining these patients' credit scores.

In 2022, Parkview reached a $2.9 million settlement with the Attorney General of Indiana to resolve allegations that Parkview staff had overbilled Medicaid by using improper revenue codes for blood-clotting tests.

A 2024 investigation by The Guardian found that Parkview hospitals ranked among the 10% most expensive in the United States in 10 of the 13 previous years.

== Locations ==
- Parkview Regional Medical Center (Fort Wayne, Ind.)
- Parkview Cancer Institute (Fort Wayne, Ind.)
- Parkview Heart Institute (Fort Wayne, Ind.)
- Parkview Ortho Hospital (Fort Wayne, Ind.)
- Parkview Women's & Children's Hospital (Fort Wayne, Ind.)
- Parkview Hospital Randallia (Fort Wayne, Ind.)
- Parkview Behavioral Health Institute (Fort Wayne, Ind.)
- Parkview DeKalb Hospital (Auburn, Ind.)
- Parkview Huntington Hospital (Huntington, Ind.)
- Parkview LaGrange Hospital (LaGrange, Ind.)
- Parkview Noble Hospital (Kendallville, Ind.)
- Parkview Wabash Hospital (Wabash, Ind.)
- Parkview Whitley Hospital (Columbia City, Ind.)
- Parkview Bryan Hospital (Bryan, Ohio)
- Parkview Montpelier Hospital (Montpelier, Ohio)
- Parkview Kosciusko Hospital (Warsaw, Ind.)
- Parkview Archbold Medical Center (Archbold, Ohio)
- Parkview Mirro Center for Research & Innovation (Fort Wayne, Ind.)
- Parkview Physicians Group – more than 100 locations in northeast Indiana and northwest Ohio
- Parkview Logansport Hospital (Logansport, Ind.)
