= Community Hospital East =

Hospital in Indianapolis, Indiana, US

- Community Health Network
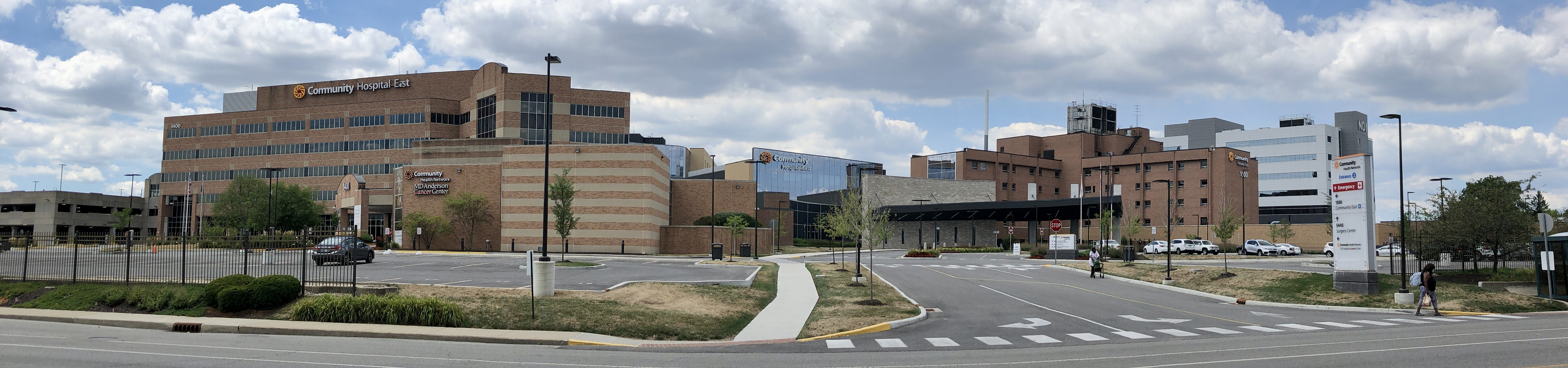
- Community Hospital East from Ritter Avenue in 2022

Geography
- Location: 1500 N. Ritter Ave., Indianapolis, Indiana, United States
- Coordinates: 39.787038°N 86.076601°W

Services
- Beds: 800

History
- Former name: Community Hospital
- Founded: August 6, 1956

Links
- Website: www.ecommunity.com/east
- Lists: Hospitals in Indiana

Community Hospital East is a general hospital located in the Community Heights neighborhood of Indianapolis, Indiana, United States. It is part of the Community Health Network group of hospitals.

== History ==
Community Hospital was founded on August 6, 1956, at the corner of 16th Street and Ritter Avenue on the east side of Indianapolis.

The hospital was the result of a fundraising effort started by volunteers who envisioned a hospital closer to the East side of Indianapolis. Volunteers began a door-to-door fundraising campaign. Soon donations came in from businesses and civic organizations. The name "Community Hospital" was chosen by leaders because of the involvement of the neighbors and community of the east side in helping build the hospital.

Ground was broken in 1954 on a 28-acre (110,000 m^{2}) site donated by farmer Edward F. Gallahue. The ground-breaking ceremony was attended by then-Vice President Richard Nixon. When opened, the $5 million hospital had the still novel installation of air conditioning technology, piped in oxygen, 300 beds, and 111 employees. W.C. McLin was the hospital's first administrator.

In 1964, "The Towers," an extension to the hospital, opened. The building's design - with two circular towers allowing central nursing stations to observe patients at all times was one of the first of its kind in the nation.

Throughout the next few years, Community Hospital underwent many expansions and upgrades, including the opening of psychiatric inpatient units, a coronary care unit, and specialized services including ambulatory care and a cardiac catheterization lab. In 1972, Allen Hicks was chosen to lead the hospital following the death of W.C. McLin in 1971. In 1974, Building 3 opened at Community Hospital, dedicated to W.C. McLin, adding 250 more beds.

More additions included the Hook Rehabilitation Center, Gallahue Mental Health Center, pain and cancer centers, plus surgery suites and education facilities. In 1981, a laboratory opened, along with a medical office building. Community hospital was, at that time, the second-largest hospital in the city of Indianapolis with approximately 800 beds, and it was considered one of the leading health-care facilities in the state.

William E. Corley became the CEO of Community Hospital in 1985 after Allen Hicks left in 1983. A new satellite hospital for Community was planned in 1982 on the north side of Indianapolis. What is now Community Hospital North opened in 1985 and has since outgrown its satellite status. Community Hospital was subsequently renamed Community Hospital East. The Same-Day Surgery Center opened at Community East in 1988 and a new main lobby, entrance, and professional building opened in 1991.

Community East marked the birth of its 100,000th baby in 1993. In 1996, Community East adopted the Family Rooms concept in the maternity unit. The unit features LDRP - labor, delivery, recovery, postpartum - rooms, allowing mothers and babies to remain in the same room throughout their stay.

The Indiana Surgery Center opened on the Community East campus in 1999 and is part of the Community Health Network. It is an outpatient surgery center formed through the partnerships of a group of surgeons. In 2004, Community East opened the Center for Interventional Radiology, one of the first centers of its kind in the country and the only one in the Midwest.

The hospital opened The Community Regional Cancer Care Radiation Oncology Treatment Center, a $7 million addition, in March 2007. In November 2007, Community East opened a 7,000-square-foot (650 m^{2}) medical oncology center. The Center for Joint Health, a specialized unit for joint replacement surgery patients, opened in July 2008. Community East celebrated its 50th anniversary in August 2006.

On August 19, 2015, Community Hospital East broke ground to replace its 60-year-old facility with a $175 million, 150-bed hospital in 2019. The campus also includes a $120 million, 159-bed state-funded psychiatric and chronic addiction treatment facility. The Indiana NeuroDiagnostic Institute and Advanced Treatment Center will replace the antiquated Larue D. Carter Memorial Hospital in 2019.

== Current status ==
Community East is currently led by Robin Ledyard, M.D., who assumed her new role as president on August 31, 2009. She replaced Anita Harden, who retired in November 2008, and Steve Hultgren who had served as interim president after Harden's retirement. Bryan Mills is the president and CEO of the parent Community Health Network.

== See also ==
- List of hospitals in Indianapolis
