= St. Vincent Indianapolis Hospital =

Hospital in Indianapolis, Indiana, US

Ascension St. Vincent Hospital - Indianapolis
- St. Vincent Health

Geography
- Location: 2001 W. 86th St., Indianapolis, Indiana, United States
- Coordinates: 39°54′29″N 86°11′49″W

Services
- Emergency department: Level I Adult Trauma Center / Level I Pediatric Trauma Center (See Peyton Manning Children's Hospital)
- Beds: 840

Links
- Website: healthcare.ascension.org/locations/indiana/ineva/indianapolis-ascension-st-vincent-hospital-indianapolis
- Lists: Hospitals in Indiana

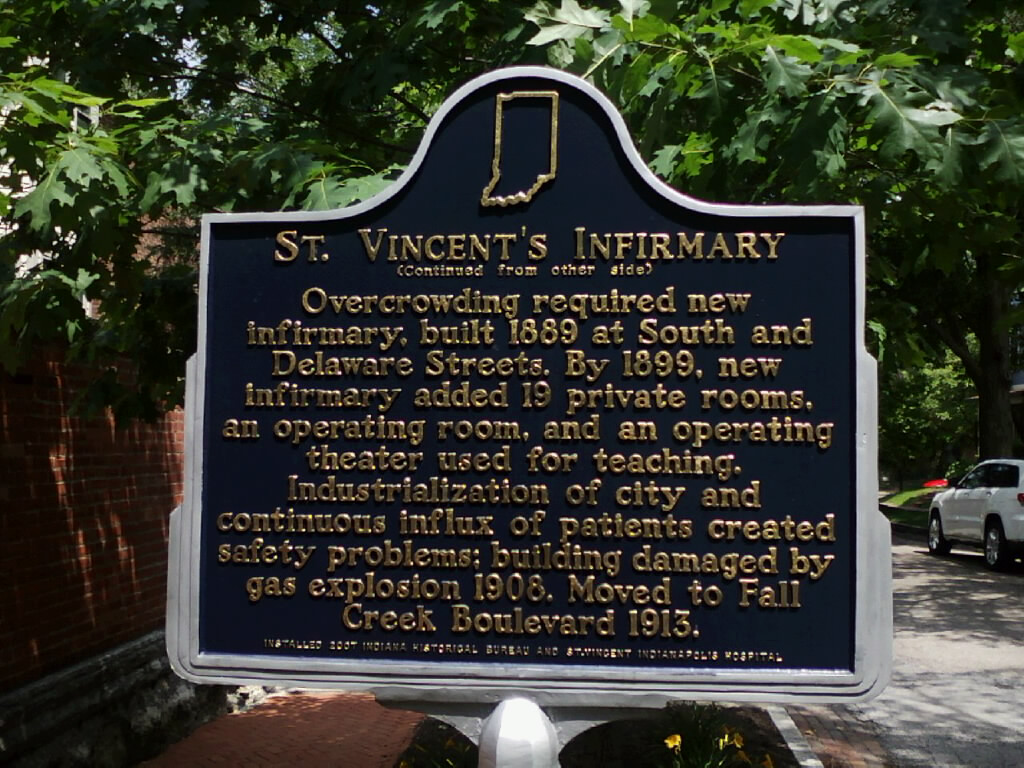
Reverse of the Indiana State Historical Marker for St. Vincent's Infirmary in Indianapolis

St. Vincent Hospital is an 840-bed hospital in Indianapolis, Indiana, United States. It is the flagship installation of St. Vincent Health which operates 22 facilities over 46 Indiana counties and is one of the largest ministries in the Catholic health care organization Ascension.

== History ==
Driven by the faith of four Daughters of Charity who arrived in Indianapolis in 1881 with $34.77 in their pockets, St. Vincent was built in 1974. The hospital has grown to include six "Centers of Excellence": Women's, Children's, Orthopedics, Cardiovascular, Neuroscience and Cancer Care.

== Peyton Manning Children's Hospital at St. Vincent ==
Built in 2004, Peyton Manning Children's Hospital at St. Vincent has more than 300 pediatric specialists, 46 private inpatient rooms, 15 private rooms in the Pediatric Intensive Care Unit and 17 private rooms in the Hilbert Pediatric Emergency Department.

The pediatric specialists and clinical staff at the children's hospital provide care in emergency medicine, cancer and blood diseases, general surgery, cardiology, orthopedics, pulmonology, otolaryngology, rehabilitation and endocrinology.

Since 1998, former NFL quarterback Peyton Manning has had a public and private relationship with St. Vincent. On September 5, 2007, Manning partnered with St. Vincent to announce the renaming of St. Vincent Children's Hospital to Peyton Manning Children's Hospital at St. Vincent.

== See also ==
- List of hospitals in Indianapolis
- List of stroke centers in the United States
- List of trauma centers in the United States
- List of children's hospitals in the United States
