= Tom and Julie Wood College of Osteopathic Medicine =

Private medical school in Indianapolis, Indiana, US

Marian University Tom and Julie Wood College of Osteopathic Medicine
- Type: Private medical school
- Established: 2010
- Parent institution: Marian University
- Affiliations: Sisters of St. Francis Oldenburg
- Religious affiliation: Roman Catholic
- Budget: $12.86 million
- President: Daniel J. Elsener
- Dean: Amanda Wright
- Students: 162
- Location: Indianapolis, Indiana, United States; 39°48′38″N 86°12′10″W
- Campus: Urban, 114 acres.
- Colors: Blue and Gold
- Website: marian.edu/osteopathic

The Tom and Julie Wood College of Osteopathic Medicine (also known by its old abbreviation MUCOM) is the medical school of Marian University, a private Catholic university in Indianapolis, Indiana, United States. Founded in 2010, it was the first osteopathic medical school to open at a Roman Catholic university and the first medical school to open in Indiana in over 100 years. It is the only other medical school in the state besides the allopathic nine-campus Indiana University School of Medicine system.

The college is accredited by the American Osteopathic Association's Commission on Osteopathic College Accreditation (COCA). Medical graduates of the college receive a Doctor of Osteopathic Medicine (D.O.).

== Campus ==
The college shares a 140,000-square-foot (13,000 m^{2}) building, called the Michael A. Evans Center for Health Sciences, with the Marian University School of Nursing, which is located on the southeast region of campus. Medical students at MUCOM attend their clinical rotations at nearby hospitals and clinics, such as those associated with St. Vincent Health, Community Health, and Franciscan Health. Students may also complete rotations at the Richard L. Roudebush VA Medical Center or Sidney & Lois Eskenazi Hospital. MUCOM does not have an agreement with the largest hospital system in Indiana, Indiana University Health, and as such it is uncommon to see MUCOM students at IU Health-affiliated hospitals and clinics.

== History ==
Marian University opened its College of Osteopathic Medicine in 2010, with funding by a $48 million donation from Michael Evans, the CEO of Indianapolis-based AIT Laboratories. The college opened as the second medical school in the state of Indiana. The inaugural class of 162 students began courses in August 2013.

== See also ==
- List of medical schools in the United States
