= Witham Health Services =

Coordinates: 40.073880°N 86.474480°W

Geography
- Location: Lebanon, Indiana, United States

History
- Opened: 1915

Links
- Lists: Hospitals in Indiana

Witham Health Services is a county-owned hospital located in Lebanon, Indiana. The hospital was established in 1915 with a grant from Flavius J. Witham and family. The hospital opened in 1917. In 2003, Witham opened a 128,000-square-foot (11,900 m^{2}) replacement hospital.
