= Community Howard Regional Health =

Coordinates: 40°26′47″N 86°07′37″W

Community Howard Regional Hospital
- Community Health Network
- Community Howard from the Northeast

Geography
- Location: 3500 S. Lafountain St, Central, Indiana, United States

Organization
- Type: Regional

Services
- Standards: Joint Commission
- Emergency department: Yes
- Beds: 152

Helipads
- Helipad: Yes

History
- Founded: 1958

Links
- Website: http://www.ecommunity.com/howard/
- Lists: Hospitals in Indiana

Community Howard Regional Health is a hospital located in Kokomo, Indiana, USA, and is part of the Community Health Network group of hospitals in Indiana.

== History ==
In 1956, after recognizing the need for more local healthcare, community leaders started planning for the construction of what was then known as Howard Community Hospital. Construction of the 100 bed facility started in 1959. The hospital was completed on the south end of Kokomo on December 3, 1961, at a cost of $2.5 million. The hospital joined Community Health Network in 2012. In 2013 hospital officials announced a $23.1 million expansion of facilities including two urgent care centers, a spinal center, a third heart catheterization lab, and a new Intensive Care Unit.

== Recognition ==
In 2013, Community Howard was again accredited as a Chest Pain Center by the Society of Cardiovascular Patient Care. Community Howard received the Patient Safety Excellence Award from Health Grades in 2013.

== Hospital rating data ==
The HealthGrades website contains the latest quality data for Community Howard Regional Health, as of 2015. For this rating section three different types of data from HealthGrades are presented: quality ratings for eighteen inpatient conditions and procedures, thirteen patient safety indicators, percentage of patients giving the hospital a 9 or 10 (the two highest possible ratings).

For inpatient conditions and procedures, there are three possible ratings: worse than expected, as expected, better than expected. For this hospital the data for this category is:

- Worse than expected - 1
- As expected - 16
- Better than expected - 1

For patient safety indicators, there are the same three possible ratings. For this hospital safety indicators were rated as:

- Worse than expected - 1
- As expected -11
- Better than expected - 1

Data for patients giving this hospital a 9 or 10 are:

- Patients rating this hospital as a 9 or 10 - 71%
- Patients rating hospitals as a 9 or 10 nationally - 69%
