= Logansport State Hospital =

Psychiatric hospital in Indiana, United States

Coordinates: 40.7423°N 86.3999°W

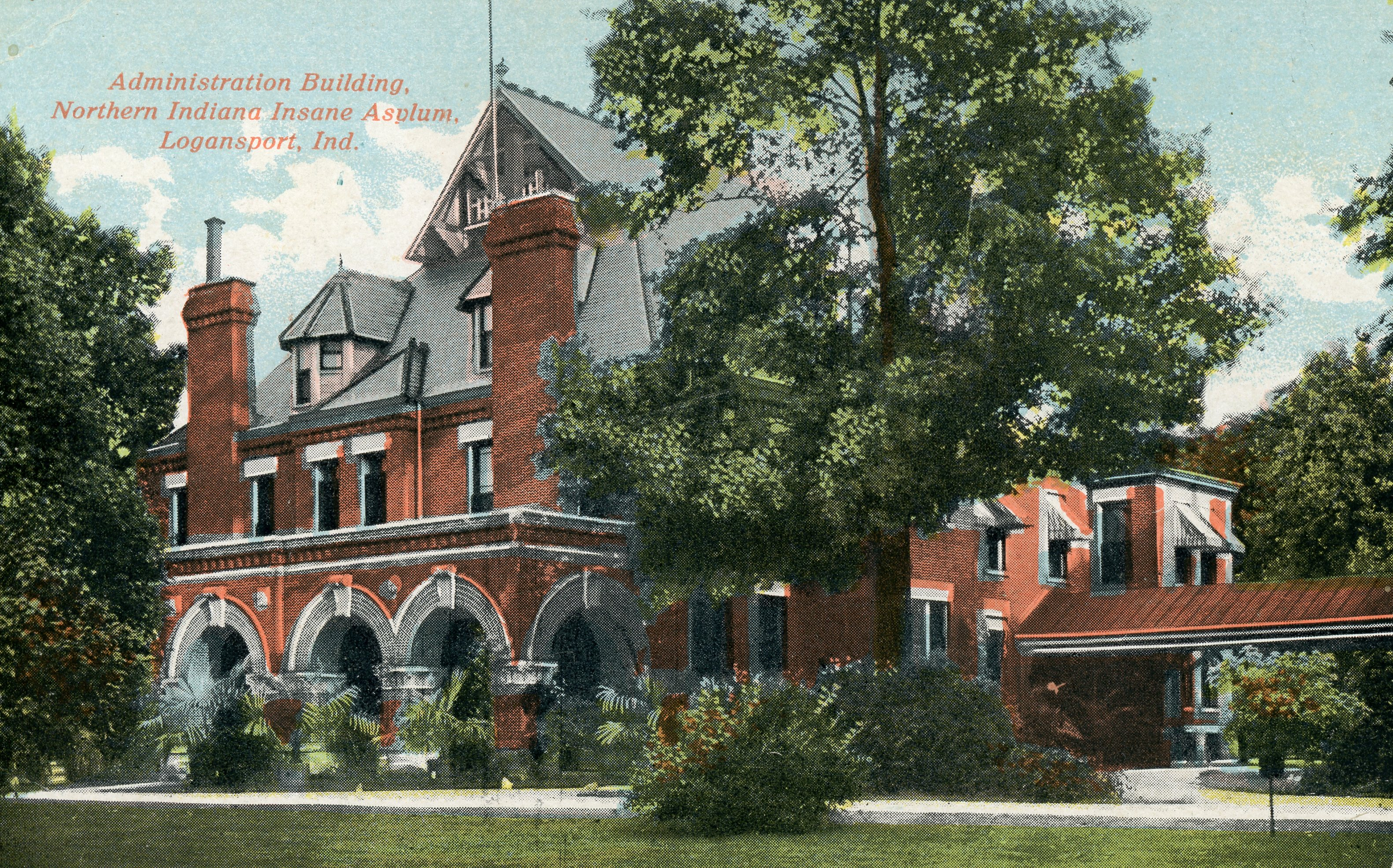
- Administration Building in early 1900s

Geography
- Location: Logansport, Indiana, United States

Organization
- Care system: Indiana Family and Social Services Administration's Division of Mental Health and Addiction
- Type: Specialist

Services
- Beds: 192
- Specialty: Psychiatric hospital

History
- Former name: Northern Indiana Hospital for the Insane
- Opened: July 1, 1888

Links
- Website: www.in.gov/fssa/dmha/state-psychiatric-hospitals/logansport-state-hospital/
- Lists: Hospitals in Indiana

Logansport State Hospital is a psychiatric hospital located in Logansport, Indiana.

The hospital opened July 1, 1888, as the Northern Indiana Hospital for the Insane and is Indiana's oldest operating psychiatric hospital. Its first superintendent was Dr. J.G. Rogers.

== History ==
The origin of the hospital goes back to March 7, 1883, when the Indiana General Assembly allotted funds for three additional State Hospital facilities: Logansport, in the northern region, Evansville, in the southern region, and Richmond, in the eastern region. The three new hospitals were to help with the increasing population of the mentally ill at the Central State Hospital, in Indianapolis. The 160 acres (65 ha) Andrew G. Shanklin farm, one mile (1.6 km) southwest of Logansport, was purchased on October 4, 1883, while the citizens of Cass County donated 121.86 acres (49.31 ha) of adjoining land, making a total of 281.86 acres (114.06 ha) owned by the State of Indiana.

The hospital opened July 1, 1888, receiving 309 patients with Dr. Joseph G. Rogers as superintendent. It was renamed Logansport State Hospital in 1927. Over time, Logansport State Hospital became known to the locals as Longcliff due to the beautiful cliffs on grounds.

== Description ==
In the 1950s, Logansport State Hospital had a surgery unit in which lobotomies were performed. The hospital also had a ward that housed tuberculosis patients, a morgue, and pathology lab. Since that time it has been used for a TV Studio and administrative offices. It is now the home of a museum, which was formerly known as the Longcliff Museum. The hospital also had a chapel, which is still in use.

The majority of the patients prior to 1960 were admitted for symptoms of organic brain syndrome. Some of the patients were born mentally incapacitated, so the families would admit them to the State Hospital because they did not want to handle them at home. That is not true currently for most of the patients.

In the early 1900s, the State Hospital was a self-sufficient facility. It had an award-winning dairy in which the patients worked. The hospital had an active farm where the patients helped raise their own vegetables. The farm was made into multiple soccer fields where many youth travel teams participate in competitive games. There were also hayfields for the animals, and patients grew their own plants and flowers in a greenhouse. The patients also helped raise their own livestock, which supplied the facility with the meat needed. They also helped bake their own goods in a bakery.

== Change ==
In the 1960s, the policy about work performed by patients for payment was changed. Today there is a patient payroll program in which some patients may be able to work in dietary, housekeeping, and cleaning vehicles in the motor pool for a restricted amount of time, the most being 5 to 10 hours per week. These jobs are all supervised by the rehabilitation department.

A new facility was opened in 1993 that housed a majority of the patients. It was named the Larson Treatment Center.

In August 2005, a new forensic unit, called the Isaac Ray Treatment Center, was opened to replace an older building that was established in 1979 to house those deemed criminally insane. The 110,000 square feet (10,000 m^{2}) Isaac Ray Treatment Center has the distinction of being the first LEED Certified NC (New Construction) facility in Indiana. Originally developed for housing men, they are currently involved in creating a women's unit on Isaac Ray. There are 105 beds in this facility. The Isaac Ray facility also holds the dental office, employee health department, x-ray department, and pharmacy.
