= Community Hospital North =

Hospital in Indianapolis, Indiana, US

- Community Health Network
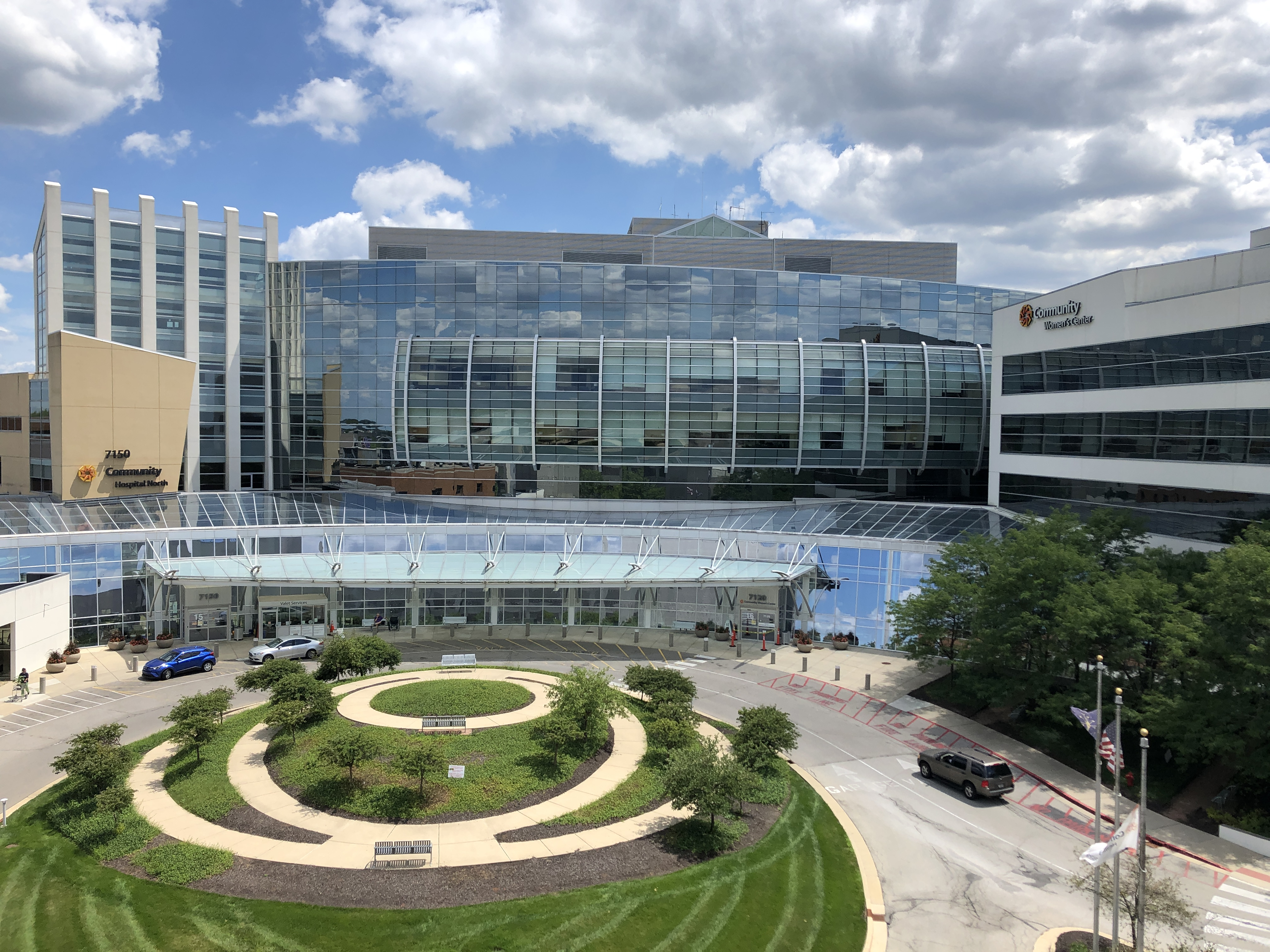
- Community Hospital North in 2022

Geography
- Location: 7150 Clearvista Dr., Indianapolis, Indiana, United States
- Coordinates: 39.900276°N 86.042144°W

History
- Opened: 1985

Links
- Website: www.ecommunity.com/north/
- Lists: Hospitals in Indiana

Community Hospital North is a general hospital in the Castleton neighborhood of Indianapolis, Indiana, United States. It is part of the Community Health Network group of hospitals.

== History ==
What is now Community Hospital North originally opened in 1985 as a satellite facility of Community Hospital of Indianapolis, which was subsequently renamed Community Hospital East.

== See also ==
- List of hospitals in Indianapolis
