= Good Samaritan Hospital (Vincennes) =

Geography
- Location: Vincennes, Indiana, United States
- Coordinates: 38°40′23.47″N 87°31′56.80″W

Organization
- Religious affiliation: Christianity

History
- Opened: 1908

Links
- Website: https://www.gshvin.org/
- Lists: Hospitals in Indiana

Good Samaritan Hospital is located in Vincennes, Indiana. It is the main hospital for Knox County, Indiana and Lawrence County, Illinois. It is located along Willow Street and Sixth Street on Vincennes' South Side.

Efforts to found a hospital in Knox County began in 1901 with a local woman's club, the Columbian Reading Circle. Opening in 1908, it was named for the Parable of the Good Samaritan and became the first county hospital in Indiana. Edith Willis served as its first superintendent from 1908 to 1944. The hospital contains, among other facilities, the Heart Center, Medical Arts Building, Same Day Surgery Center, Cancer Pavilion, Gibault Memorial Tower (named for Jesuit missionary Pierre Gibault), and the Charles C. Hedde M.D. Health Education Center. Additionally, Good Samaritan maintains a podiatry office at the Bierhaus Building on N. Second Street. Good Samaritan is a partner of the Indiana University School of Medicine as part of the college's Southwest Indiana Internal Medicine Residency program.

== See also ==
- List of hospitals in Indiana

== Resources ==
- Good Samaritan Hospital Site
