= Memorial Hospital of South Bend =

Coordinates: 41°41′0″N 86°15′4″W

Memorial Hospital
- Beacon Health System
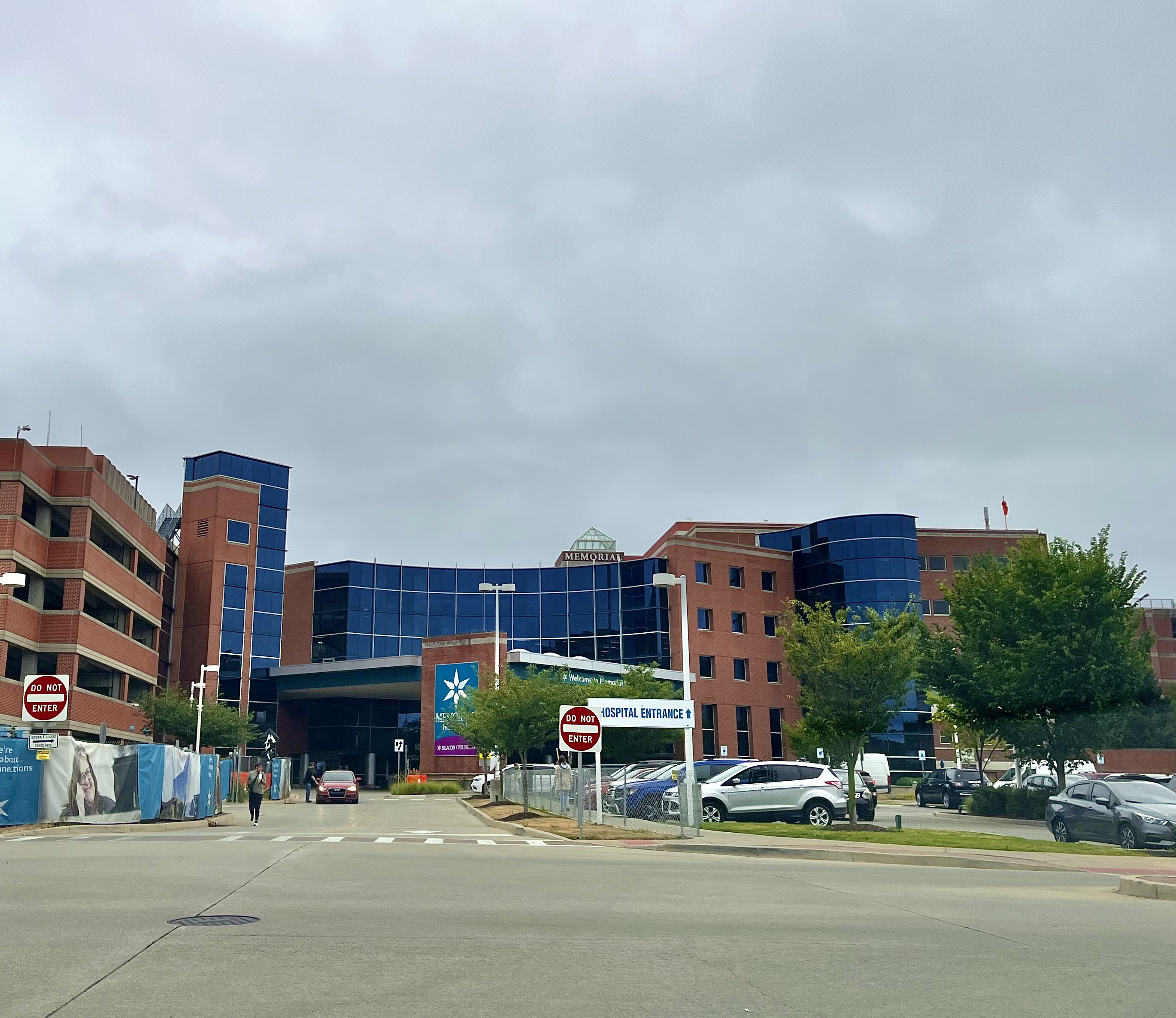

Geography
- Location: South Bend, Indiana, United States

Organization
- Type: Non-profit Hospital

Services
- Emergency department: Level II trauma center
- Beds: 526 staffed beds

History
- Founded: 1894

Links
- Lists: Hospitals in Indiana

Memorial Hospital is a short-term acute care hospital located in South Bend, Indiana. The hospital was founded in 1894 with three patient beds. Today, the hospital has 526 beds and is a designated Level II trauma center. The hospital places a large emphasis on innovation, and is the second-largest employer in the St. Joseph County, Indiana area.

== History ==
Memorial Hospital was founded in a converted home in 1894 as Epworth Hospital and Training School. The hospital quickly outgrew this residence, and a four-story, 50-bed facility opened in 1901. Epworth Hospital continued to expand, and in 1945 it was renamed Memorial Hospital of South Bend. The hospital currently operates under a parent company, Memorial Health System, Inc., which includes Memorial Hospital, Memorial Health Foundation, Memorial Home Care, and Memorial Medical Group. All of these organizations are certified 501(c)(3) nonprofit organizations, except for Memorial Home Care, which is a for-profit home health organization.

In March 2011, it was announced that Memorial Hospital was partnering with Elkhart General Hospital to merge the two healthcare systems. In 2012, it was announced that the new name of the combined healthcare system will be Beacon Health System.

== Services ==
Memorial Hospital is a designated Level II trauma center. Clinical services include inpatient and outpatient surgery, heart and vascular, newborn intensive care, pediatrics, childbirth, children's therapy, cancer, rehabilitation, sleep disorders, sports medicine, radiology, bariatrics, occupational health and clinical research. The hospital also provides patient and family support services, community outreach, and imaging services. In March 2011, Memorial Hospital purchased the inpatient assets of Madison Center, a local mental health facility, adding approximately 90 beds and starting an inpatient psychiatry program for both Adult and Pediatric patients in the new Memorial Epworth Center.

== Innovation ==
Memorial Hospital places a large significance on innovation. According to the Journal of Healthcare Management, "...hospitals are experiencing many of the same competitive problems that plague other industries, such as the lack of differentiated services, a shrinking operating margin, and shortage of talent." Memorial established a dedicated research and development center to address this. The organization partnered with numerous businesses outside of healthcare including 3M, Dupont, IDEO, Land's End, Motorola, Steelcase, Walmart and Whirlpool to develop standards for managing an in-house innovation program. Results of the organization's efforts include an innovation teaching lab and retail medicine clinics.

== Economic impact ==
Memorial Health System employs around 3,800 people. This number makes it the second-largest employer in the St. Joseph County, Indiana region. According to an economic impact study done by Quantech Research Associates, Memorial employees "...paid more than $5 million in state and local income taxes, in addition to more than $50 million in federal income taxes." The hospital generated $368.5 million in revenues in 2008.
