= Logansport Memorial Hospital =

Hospital in Indiana, United States

Coordinates: 40.7631°N 86.3622°W

Logansport Memorial Hospital is an 83-bed, HFAP-accredited, regional medical center providing healthcare services to residents in Logansport, Cass County, and the surrounding north central Indiana area.

== History ==
The origin of the hospital goes back to its founding in 1925, when the formerly titled Cass County Hospital admitted its first patient on May 14. Staff included the first administrator – a woman, named Miss Harriet Jones – and also a graduate nurse, one bookkeeper, seven registered nurses, five undergraduate nurses, and a graduate physician. In July 1947, the hospital changed its name to Memorial Hospital, now better known today as Logansport Memorial Hospital.

As healthcare services have been upgraded through construction and technology, the original 1925 structure has been either torn down or renovated along the way. Today, the facility comprises two medical office buildings for physician practices, a comprehensive obstetrical unit known as the Family Birth Center, a wing of private inpatient rooms, a full-service surgery wing, emergency room, and a parking deck for patients, among other areas. Every area of Logansport Memorial Hospital is now modern and utilizes green technology wherever possible.

== About ==
Logansport Memorial Hospital (LMH) is proud to be an independent, county-owned, not-for-profit hospital serving the communities in Cass and surrounding counties. LMH has integrated its physician practices into the Logansport Memorial Physician Network, and employs today more than 50 medical providers, including board-certified physicians, nurse practitioners, and other professionals. Consulting physicians are also included as part of the LMH medical staff in an effort to offer local alternatives for access to specialty care. As the 3rd largest employer in Cass County, LMH employs almost 600 full-time and part-time equivalent employees who deliver a wide range of services to patients.

=== Hospital Services ===
- Acute inpatient care
- Ambulatory surgery center
- Full spectrum of outpatient services
  - On-site Laboratory
  - Medical Imaging – CT, MRI, Ultrasound
  - Respiratory Care – Cardiac and Pulmonary Rehabilitation
  - Therapy services – Physical, Occupational, Speech
- Level II Emergency Room
- Health and Wellness
- Occupational Health

=== Logansport Memorial Physician Network Offices ===
- Ear Nose and Throat
- Family Medicine
- General Surgery
- Internal Medicine
- Obstetrics and Gynecology
- Orthopedics
- Pediatrics
- Pulmonology
- Urology

== Facilities ==
=== Logansport Memorial Hospital ===
==== Medical Office Building West ====
1201 Michigan Avenue
Logansport, IN 46947

==== Medical Office Building East ====
1025 Michigan Avenue
Logansport, IN 46947

==== LMPN General Surgery ====
820 Fulton Street
Logansport, IN 46947

=== Clinic Locations ===
==== Express Medical Center ====
3400 E. Market Street
Logansport, IN 46947

==== Camden Health Center ====
132 West Main
Camden, IN 46917

==== Peru Medical Center ====
751 W 2nd Street, Suite 100
Peru, IN 46970
