= OrthoIndy Hospital =

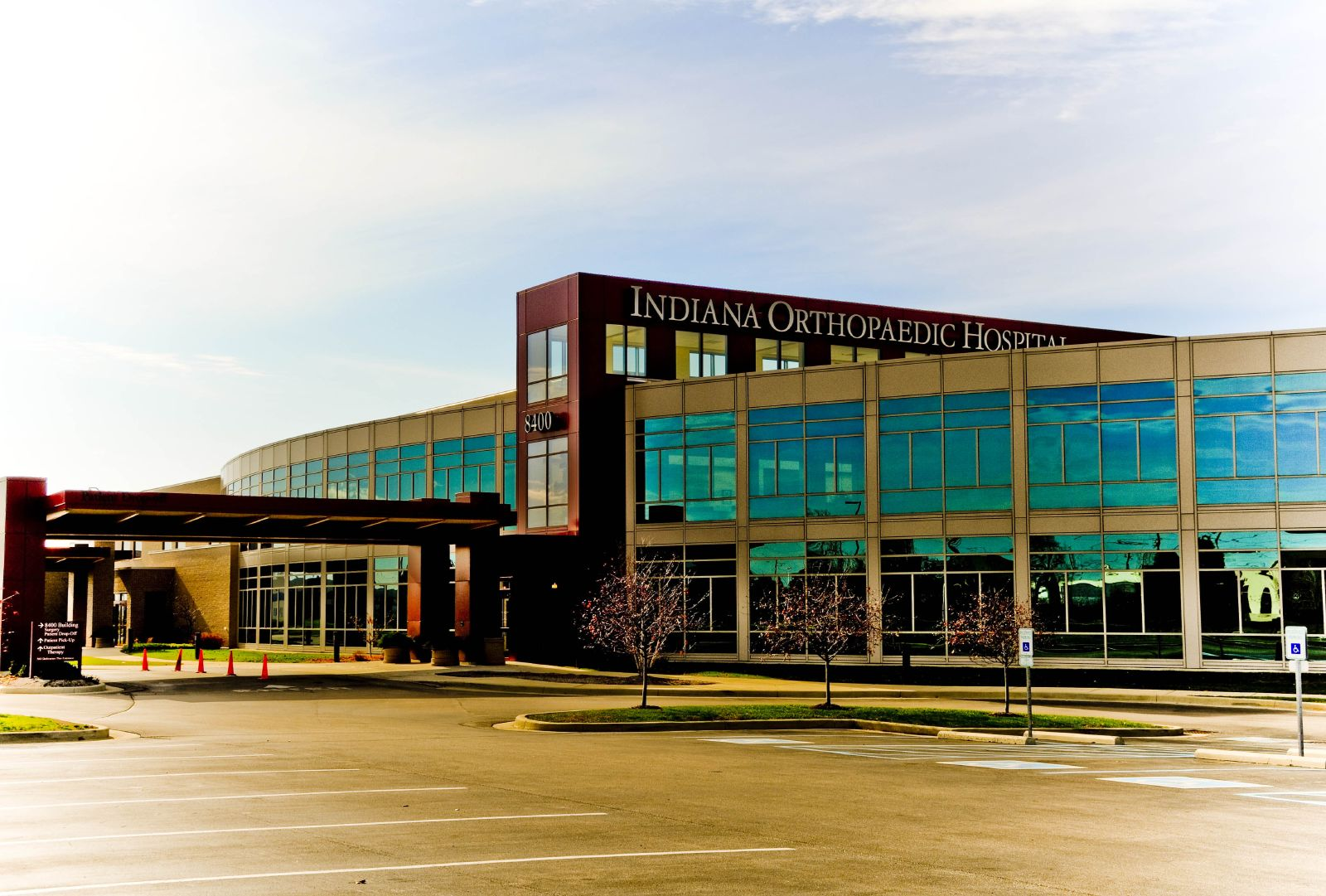
- OrthoIndy Hospital Northwest in 2008

Geography
- Location: 8400 Northwest Blvd., Indianapolis, Indiana, United States
- Coordinates: 39°54′28″N 86°16′2″W

Organization
- Type: Acute Care Hospital

History
- Founded: 2005

Links
- Website: www.orthoindy.com
- Lists: Hospitals in Indiana

Indiana Orthopaedic Hospital, also known as OrthoIndy Hospital, is a 37-bed acute care hospital that specializes in musculoskeletal therapy located in Indianapolis, Indiana, United States. The hospital is Indiana's first specialty hospital with a focus on orthopedics. The hospital was founded in 2005 by OrthoIndy physicians to provide focused care on orthopedic procedures, physical therapy, and imaging services. It includes both inpatient and outpatient procedures, but does not provide emergency services. OrthoIndy Hospital is accredited by the American Osteopathic Association's Healthcare Facilities Accreditation Program.

== See also ==
- List of hospitals in Indianapolis
