= Deaconess Gibson Hospital =

Coordinates: 38.3609°N 87.5903°W

Geography
- Location: 1800 Sherman Drive, Princeton, Indiana 47670, Indiana, United States of America

Services
- Emergency department: Yes

Helipads
- Helipad: Yes

History
- Founded: January 24, 1907

Links
- Website: http://www.gibsongeneral.com

Deaconess Gibson Hospital, formerly Gibson General Hospital, is a hospital institution in Princeton, Indiana, serving largely Gibson County, Indiana but also largely serves Wabash County, Illinois as well. It is located along Sherman Drive at the northern end of Princeton's West Side or two blocks north of the WRAY/WRAY-FM Studios.

The current hospital has 64 slots for patients.

== History ==
Princeton Sanatorium opened in 1907 and closed in 1910. Methodist Hospital Corporation re-established the hospital in 1917. It was renamed Gibson General Hospital and became an individual private hospital in 1941. From 1956 to 1962 the current hospital was built. It entered into a management agreement with the Deaconess Health System, based in Evansville, Indiana, in 2016.

In June 2020 it signed an agreement to become a hospital within the Deaconess system. Gibson joined the system and received its current name on October 1, 2020.

== See also ==
- Deaconess Hospital (Evansville, Indiana)
