= Deaconess Midtown Hospital =

Geography
- Location: southwestern Indiana, southern Illinois, northwestern Kentucky, United States
- Coordinates: 37.9834°N 87.5708°W

Links
- Website: http://deaconess.com/
- Lists: Hospitals in the United States

Deaconess Midtown Hospital is a hospital in Evansville, Indiana. It is part of the Deaconess Health System.

The hospital has 249 private one person rooms for inpatients. Admittedly it can serve 58 people at a time in its outpatient services.

It was known as Deaconess Hospital until August 2017, when it assumed its current name. Before it received a distinct name, it was informally distinguished from other Deaconess hospitals by the community as the Main Hospital, the Downtown Hospital, or the hospital on Mary Street.
