= Austin O'Malley (author) =

American author, ophthalmologist, and professor

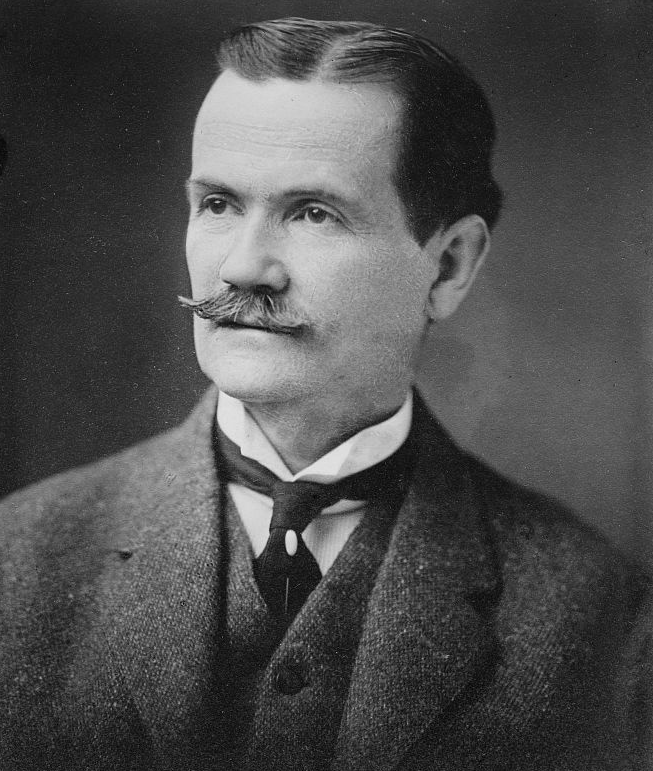
- O'Malley circa 1915
- Born: October 1, 1858; Pittston, Pennsylvania
- Died: February 26, 1932 (aged 73); Philadelphia, Pennsylvania
- Spouse: Aline Demetria Ellis

Austin O'Malley, M.D. (October 1, 1858 - February 26, 1932) was an ophthalmologist and a professor of English literature at University of Notre Dame. He was an author of a book of aphorisms.

== Biography ==
He was born on October 1, 1858, in Pittston, Pennsylvania, to William O'Malley and Katherine Ward. He had a brother, Dr. Joseph O'Malley.

Austin was a professor of English literature at University of Notre Dame until 1902.

On March 10, 1902, he married Aline Demetria Ellis in Manhattan. She was 20 years younger than he. Shortly after the marriage, she poisoned him with arsenic. After three months she robbed his brother, Joseph O'Malley, and tried to elope with William J. Hearin. He was her age, and a Cornell University student.

He died on February 26, 1932, at St. Agnes Hospital in Philadelphia, Pennsylvania. His papers were archived at University of Notre Dame.

== Aphorisms ==
- Evil contains within the seeds of its own destruction.
- Memory is a crazy woman that hoards colored rags and throws away food.
- A hole is nothing at all, but you can break your neck in it.
- Those who believe it is all right to tell little white lies soon grow color blind.
- If you keep your eyes so fixed on heaven that you never look at the earth, you will stumble into hell.

== Works ==
- The Ethics of Medical Homicide and Mutilation
- Thoughts of a Recluse (1898)
- The Cure of Alcoholism (1913)
- Keystones of Thought (1914)
