= St. Vincent Health =

The St. Vincent logo of three doves, which represents caring for mind, body and spirit.

A member of Ascension Health, the largest not-for-profit and Catholic Healthcare System in the US, St. Vincent Health contains 18 health ministries serving 45 counties in Indiana.

== Facilities ==
Hospital	City
Ascension St. Vincent Kokomo	Kokomo
St. Vincent Anderson Regional Hospital	Anderson
St. Vincent Carmel Hospital	Carmel
St. Vincent Clay Hospital	Brazil
St. Vincent Dunn Hospital	Bedford
St. Vincent Evansville Hospital	Evansville
St. Vincent Fishers Hospital	Fishers
St. Vincent Heart Center of Indiana	Indianapolis
St. Vincent Jennings Hospital	North Vernon
St. Vincent Mercy Hospital	Elwood
St. Vincent Randolph Hospital	Winchester
St. Vincent Salem Hospital	Salem
St. Vincent Seton Specialty Hospital	Williamsport
St. Vincent Stress Center	Williamsport
St. Vincent Warrick Hospital	Boonville
St. Vincent Williamsport Hospital	Williamsport
St. Vincent Women's Hospital	Indianapolis
Peyton Manning Children's Hospital	Indianapolis
Rehabilitation Hospital of Indiana	Williamsport
St. Vincent Indianapolis Hospital	Indianapolis

== Reducing disparities ==
In 2001, St. Vincent Health implemented a program known as Rural and Urban Access to Health to enhance access to care for underserved populations, including Hispanic migrant workers. As of December 2012, the program had facilitated more than 78,000 referrals to care and enabled the distribution of $43.7 million worth of free or reduced-cost prescription drugs.
