= Ascension (healthcare system) =

US private Catholic health care system

- Type: Nonprofit organization
- Industry: Healthcare
- Founded: 1999; 27 years ago
- Headquarters: St. Louis, Missouri, U.S.
- Number of locations: 90 hospitals
- Key people: Eduardo Conrado (President & CEO)
- Services: Hospital management
- Revenue: ▲US$28.3 billion (2023)
- Operating income: ▲US$676.3 million (2021)
- Net income: ▲US$5.7 billion (2021)
- Number of employees: 142,000 (2021)
- Website: ascension.org

Ascension is a large private Catholic healthcare system in the United States. Ascension had 142,000 employees, 90 hospitals, and 40 senior living facilities operating in 17 states and the District of Columbia as of July 1, 2025. Ascension is one of the largest nonprofit and one of the largest Catholic health systems in the United States. It also operates a number of for-profit firms, including subsidiaries involved in private equity, venture capital, insurance, medical software, and pharmacy delivery.

Formed in 1999 from the merger of two Catholic healthcare organizations, Ascension is bound by the Ethical and Religious Directives for Catholic Health Care Services. Ascension had an operating revenue of $27.2 billion at the end of fiscal year 2021. The president and CEO is Joseph R. Impicciche, one of the highest-paid nonprofit CEOs in the United States.

Ascension has faced a number of investigations and controversies. A 2022 investigation by The New York Times alleged Ascension hospitals instigated a staffing crisis via system-wide layoffs, leading nurses and doctors to file complaints about possible preventable deaths. National Nurses United has alleged that Ascension has increased maternal mortality by consolidating and then closing obstetrics units.

In 2024, Ascension was a victim of a severe cyberattack that affected operations for several weeks.

== Overview ==
Ascension was the largest nonprofit and Catholic health system in the United States as of 2021. It operated more than 2,600 health care sites in 19 states and Washington, D.C., including 142 hospitals and 40 senior living facilities. It employed more than 142,000 people as of 2021. Ascension had an operating revenue of $27.2 billion at the end of fiscal year 2021. The company was led by president and CEO Joseph R. Impicciche and is headquartered in St. Louis, Missouri, at 4600 Edmundson Road.

In addition to health and senior care facilities, Ascension also operates several subsidiary companies, including an investment management firm called Ascension Investment Management, Ascension Care Management, an insurance holdings company, and Ascension Technologies, a healthcare information technology services company. Ascension also operates a for-profit venture capital subsidiary called Ascension Ventures, which invests in medical startups. Ascension runs a pharmacy and drug delivery system under the name AscensionRx.

== Hospitals ==
In 2025, Ascension had 90 hospitals. Several of them have been recognized for care, including cardiovascular by Fortune magazine and maternity by Newsweek. Among them, Ascension St. Vincent in Indianapolis and Ascension Sacred Heart Hospital in Pensacola.

== History ==
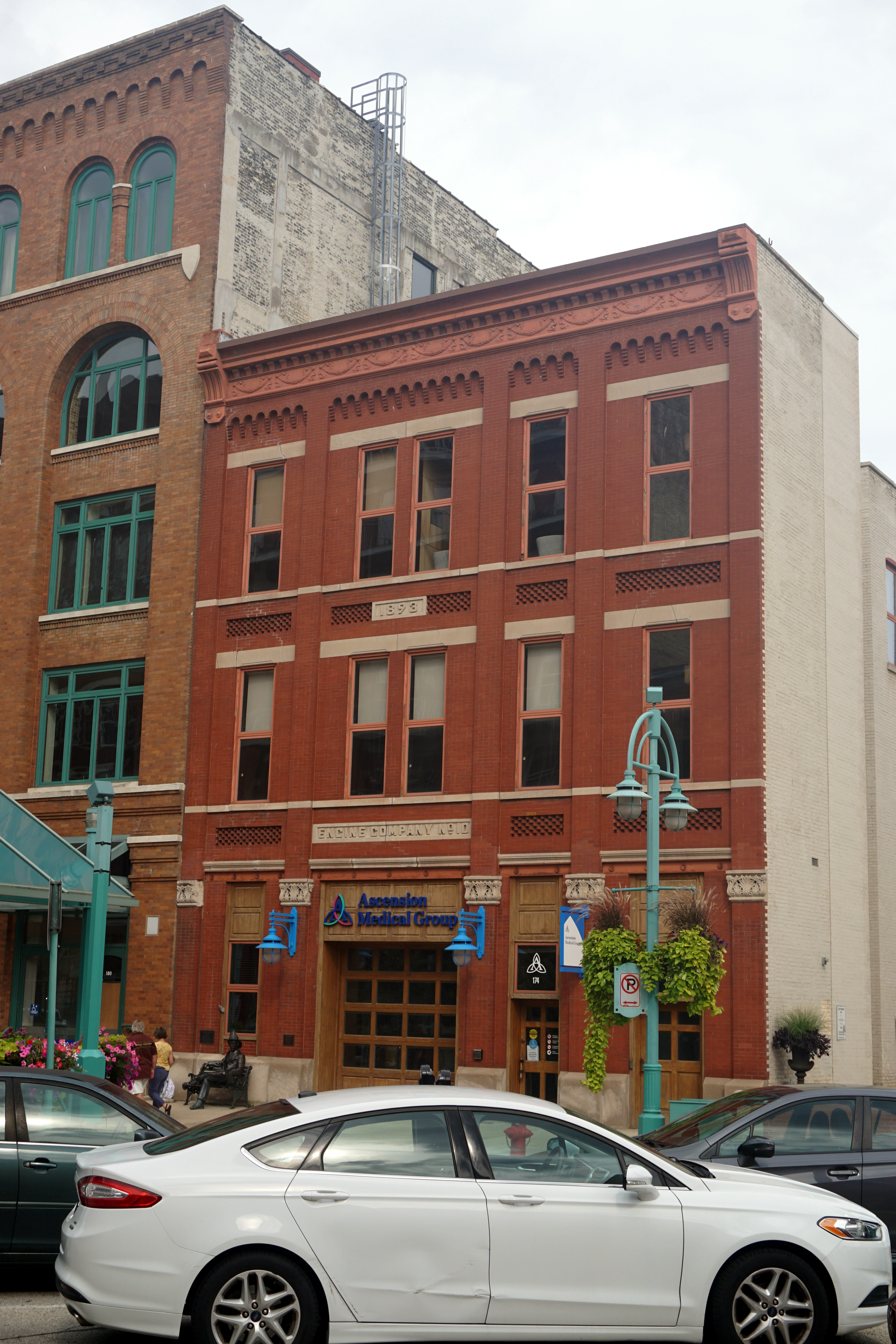
Ascension Medical Group Wisconsin in the former Milwaukee Fire Department Engine Company No. 10 station in Milwaukee

In 1999, the Daughters of Charity National Health System and Sisters of St. Joseph Health System merged to create Ascension Health. In 2010 the Catholic congregations that had sponsored Ascension ceased to do so. They were replaced by a sponsoring group of "both religious and lay persons" whose identities Ascension has declined to share.

In 2012, the company underwent a restructuring and rebranding, dropping the "Health" moniker and going forward as Ascension. In the process, the company brought its subsidiaries under a national umbrella and renamed all its hospitals to include the Ascension name, which the company hoped would improve clients' understanding of the system.

In 2014, the company partnered in opening the $2 billion Health City Cayman Islands project, and sold its stake in 2017.

Ascension announced plans to make changes to its business model in 2018, shifting away from a hospital-oriented business to one prioritizing outpatient care and telemedicine. The move was made in response to decreased government reimbursements, reduced profit margins, and higher costs of care.

In December 2018, the Attorney General of the District of Columbia brought suit against Ascension in an attempt to prevent the closure of the Providence Health System hospital, which served a low-income population but was financially unviable. Though the D.C. city council specifically passed an ordinance to give the city the power to block the closing, the suit was ultimately withdrawn by the Attorney General after reviewing plans for the hospital's closure.

In 2021, Ascension opened a pharmacy hub in Austin, Texas. The hub fills 5,000 prescriptions per shift and houses a "patient engagement center" designed to offer patients assistance with understanding their medication. Officials with the company have said they hope to reduce hospitalizations by improving at-home prescription management through the hub. In October that year, Ascension and AdventHealth announced the planned dissolution of their joint venture AMITA Health in 2022. Each system will retain the hospitals they originally contributed to the partnership.

It became public on May 8, 2024, that Ascension was a victim of a massive cyberattack that made it impossible to access thousands of patients' records. Mandiant was tapped to assist in the investigation. Russian ransomware operator Black Basta, a.k.a. "Conti." was blamed for the attack, CNN reported. Patient medical records were restored by June 11, after more than a month of inaccessibility, a period that saw delayed appointments and patients' health allegedly being put at risk. Class-action lawsuits were filed amid the attack against Ascension because the hack was "foreseeable and preventable," according to those bringing the lawsuits. In December 2024, Ascension began notifying approximately 5.6 million individuals whose personal and health information was compromised in the breach, making it one of the largest healthcare data breaches in the United States in 2024.

Following the cyberattack and financial losses during fiscal year 2023, Ascension began to sell hospitals. It sold three Michigan hospitals and an ambulatory surgical center in March. In August 2022, it was announced that Ascension St. Vincent's Health System would be taken over by the Alabama Health System Authority.

On March 1, 2025, Prime Healthcare acquired eight Chicago-area hospitals and seven senior living and care facilities from Ascension.

== Controversies ==
=== Pension lawsuit ===
In April 2016, a class-action lawsuit was brought in federal court, alleging that Ascension subsidiary Wheaton Franciscan Services (in Glendale, Wisconsin), erred by treating its pension plan as though it was a "church plan," exempt from the Employee Retirement Income Security Act ("ERISA"), a federal law governing employee pensions. In January, 2018, the parties announced a settlement, in which Ascension would pay $29.5 million to the plaintiffs.

=== OB/GYN defamation and fraud lawsuit ===
In February 2020, a jury awarded obstetrician/gynecologist Rebecca Denman, M.D., $4.75 million in damages by an Indiana jury, after suing Ascension's St. Vincent Carmel Hospital and its St. Vincent Medical Group for defamation and fraud. The lawsuit arose from a December 2017 incident, in which Denman was accused of smelling like alcohol while on duty. Denman contended that she had been cheated out of the due process, as provided in the company substance-abuse policy, depriving her of a chance to establish her innocence, and retain her position.

=== Birth control ===
In 2018, Ascension hospitals abruptly stopped performing tubal ligations and vasectomies, as part of the nonprofit's Catholic belief that all artificial birth control is immoral. Some patients reported not having been informed by Ascension hospitals that their planned tubal ligation or vasectomy was canceled.

This increased costs and risks for those who give birth in an Ascension hospital and then seek permanent birth control, as they must schedule a follow-up surgery rather than having the customary option of having a tubal ligation immediately follow a Caesarean section birth.

The ACLU of Michigan has filed multiple complaints against Ascension regarding its practices surrounding birth control, including in 2021 in Michigan when a pregnant woman was denied a tubal ligation post-birth even though the woman's life would be at risk if she were to get pregnant again.

=== Refusal to treat ectopic pregnancy ===
A patient named Kyleigh Thurman filed a complaint with the Department of Health and Human Services claiming that, in February 2023, Ascension Seton Williamson Hospital in the Austin suburb of Round Rock refused to treat her ectopic pregnancy or to transfer her to another hospital; she was instead discharged. She says the hospital again denied her treatment when she returned with vaginal bleeding, days later, a delay which caused her fallopian tube to rupture.

As a Catholic hospital, Ascension is required to follow the Ethical and Religious Directives for Catholic Health Care Services which stipulate that doctors may never perform an abortion, even to save a woman's life in the case of extrauterine pregnancy. Intentionally allowing the rupture of the fallopian tube, risking the patient's death, is historically a common practice at Catholic hospitals in accord with the requirements of Catholic bishops.

=== Death of Yeniifer Alvarez-Estrada Glick ===
In early 2022, a pregnant woman named Yeniifer "Yeni" Alvarez-Estrada Glick came to the emergency room of Ascension Seton Edgar B. Davis, in Luling, Texas, reporting breathing problems, diabetes, hypertension, and a history of pulmonary edema. She came back and multiple times thereafter with increasing problems. She was never offered the option of terminating her pregnancy, which is a common procedure in a situation like Glick's. She died of hypertensive cardiovascular disease on July 10, 2022. Her death was the subject of a 2024 exposé in The New Yorker.

=== National Nurses United report ===
A 2024 report by National Nurses United claimed that "Ascension is one of the nation's worst offenders for closing obstetrics units" because it closed 26 percent of its labor and delivery departments since 2012, particularly in low-income, Black, and Hispanic neighborhoods and in concentrated health care markets. This increased maternal mortality, particularly in Bay County, Florida where the maternal death rate in the county more than doubled. The report concluded that "Ascension Betrays its mission by gutting care for pregnant patients and babies."

The United States Conference of Catholic Bishops declined to comment on the closures. Charles Bouchard, a former director of the Catholic Health Association and vice president of theological education at Ascension, observed the bishops would be incapable of solving the problem: "They can keep hospitals from doing something if it's seen as at odds with Catholic teaching. But they can't, unless they're going to pay for it, they can't go out and say, 'you've got to keep this hospital open.'"

Ge Bai at Johns Hopkins University said that the cuts were likely made to maximize profitability; obstetrics and gynecology services are low-margin units, especially in locations where many patients are on Medicaid. In an essay about the closures and the death of Glick, author Jessica Valenti disparaged Ascension as "the Catholic hospital system killing women."

=== Project Nightingale ===
The Wall Street Journal reported on a collaboration between Ascension and Google in 2019 to share health information about its patients with the technology company. Known as Project Nightingale, the stated purpose of the collaboration was to make it easier for physicians to access and search their patient records. The partnership drew criticism over privacy concerns and the potential for violations of the Health Insurance Portability and Accountability Act, and the U.S. Department of Health and Human Services opened an investigation into the project in 2020. Cason Schmit, a professor of public health at Texas A&M University, noted that the Nightingale Project could improve health outcomes, especially by gathering data from minorities that are underrepresented in clinical studies, but also raised the lack of a patient opt-out and the Project's unclear transparency and accountability processes as concerns.

=== Unusual private equity investments and Wall Street-style private equity fund ===
In 2021, Stat News reported that Ascension, despite its ostensible mission to prioritize serving the poor, was unusually operating a multi-billion-dollar private equity fund similar to moneymaking operations on Wall Street. The fund was set up in 2015 in partnership with a firm called TowerBrook Capital Partners.

In reaction to this news and other issues reported within Ascension, Wisconsin Senator Tammy Baldwin issued a statement, saying “As a nonprofit, tax-exempt, health system, Ascension is required to provide charitable benefits to the community and operate solely to serve a public, rather than a private interest. Despite these requirements, Ascension has significant for-profit investment activities that dwarf what the system provides in annual charity care.”

A professor of accounting and health policy at Johns Hopkins University, Ge Bai, called Ascension's operation of such a massive fund "aggressive and controversial," noting that "it is not clear how those investment incomes or returns are aligned with Ascension's charitable mission."

In April 2021, minority shareholders in the medical revenue cycle management company R1 RCM sued Ascension and TowerBrook, accusing them "of teaming up to extract $105 million years before they were supposed to." In October 2023, it was reported that "Ascension Health Alliance and TowerBrook Capital Partners LP will shoulder most of a $45.4 million settlement ending shareholder litigation over their deal to unlock long-term investments in medical billing company R1 RCM Inc."

=== Record pay for nonprofit executives ===
For several years, the highest paid CEO of any nonprofit in the United States were the CEOs of Ascension Health, Anthony Tersigni and later Joseph Impicciche, who were typically compensated with more than $10 million in earnings per year in the 2010s. Other executives were making millions of dollars a year in direct compensation from the nonprofit. As of 2022, Impicciche's compensation still ranked among the top 10 highest nonprofit CEOs in the U.S., while the No. 1 spot had been taken by the CEO of Sentara Healthcare, who had an estimated salary of 33.22 million U.S. dollars.

Reporting of this led to condemnation, as Democratic Wisconsin State Senator Chris Larson called Ascension “a profit machine that punishes the sick and rewards the greedy.” U.S. Senator Tammy Baldwin also wrote an open letter to the hospital, stating "As a nonprofit, tax-exempt, health system, Ascension is required to provide charitable benefits to the community … I am concerned that the opposite is occurring – that by operating like a private equity fund, Ascension is squeezing staff, closing facilities, and extracting cash from its member hospitals for dubious 'management fees' all to advance its investment activities and provide compensation to its executives."

CEO Tersigni and CFO Anthony Speranzo left the healthcare side of the operation in 2019 to lead the investment side of its operations, thus earning more income while effectively keeping the same employer.

=== COVID-19 pandemic profits ===
Near the beginning of the coronavirus pandemic in March 2020, several Ascension-owned hospitals in Wisconsin informed uninsured patients they would not be charged for testing or treatment of COVID-19. Ascension drew considerable criticism for receiving over $211 million in government bailout relief payments despite having $15.5 billion in cash reserves—enough to operate for eight months. Ascension spokespersons responded by saying the payments were justified as the company had not laid-off or furloughed employees during the pandemic.

In December 2022, a multi-part New York Times investigation was published that alleged Ascension was caught "flat-footed" by the COVID-19 pandemic because the health care system had been significantly cutting jobs of nurses and aides prior to spring of 2020, boosting profits in exchange for diminished patient care while adding to an ongoing crisis of nurses leaving the field. The Times reported that, "As recently as 2019, Ascension was trumpeting its success at reducing its number of employees per occupied bed, a common industry staffing metric. At one point, executives boasted to their peers about how they had slashed $500 million from the chain's labor costs ... During surges in the coronavirus, Ascension repeatedly reduced its capacity by more than 500 beds nationwide because it did not have enough workers." Nurses increasingly were called on to work 16 hour shifts, and in some places hospital aides' jobs were replaced by robotics.

The hospital chain said that it began cutting costs in labor after the passage of the Affordable Care Act, turning an anticipated $5.2 billion loss to $2.7 in profits over a five-year span. The nonprofit continued cutting jobs even after the healthcare market destabilized. Milwaukee Magazine described "chaos" at one Milwaukee hospital, with doctors and other medical staff saying that Ascension's employment decisions were creating unsafe environments for their patients, in part because surgeries were being repeatedly delayed because of limited staff, there not being enough workers on site to answer phones, and doctors fielding phone calls while simultaneously performing surgeries.

In December 2022, unionized health care workers and residents in Milwaukee unsuccessfully protested in opposition to the closure of an urban Ascension-run labor and delivery unit at Columbia St. Mary's Hospital. Ascension claimed the closure was due to a lack of demand in the area because of falling birth rates, although there had previously been "an exodus (of) doctors from Columbia St. Mary's birthing unit." In November 2024 after financial losses and in the wake of the company's systems being hacked, Ascension announced the closure of a "micro-hospital" in Waukesha only opened three years before.

Also in December 2022, The Wall Street Journal reported that "Of hospitals divested or closed by St. Louis–based Ascension, about half were located in higher-poverty areas."

== See also ==
- Project Nightingale
- Ascension Michigan
