= Lutheran Health Network =

Nonprofit healthcare system in Indiana, U.S.

- Industry: Healthcare
- Number of locations: 9
- Area served: Fort Wayne, Indiana, Bluffton, Indiana, Peru, Indiana, Warsaw, Indiana, Wabash, Indiana, Fulton County, Indiana
- Owner: Community Health Systems
- Number of employees: 4,768 in Allen County
- Website: www.lutheranhealth.net

Lutheran Health Network is a healthcare provider and one of the largest employers in the northeast region of Indiana in the United States. The network employs over 7,000 people, including more than 800 physicians. The network's more than 100 access points in northern Indiana include physician offices, urgent care clinics, outpatient centers, and eight hospitals with 973 licensed beds—797 in Allen County alone.

Lutheran Health Network is a subsidiary of Community Health Systems.

== Centers ==
- Lutheran Hospital
- Lutheran Downtown Hospital
- Dupont Hospital
- Lutheran Children's Hospital
- The Orthopedic Hospital of Lutheran Health Network
- Rehabilitation Hospital of Fort Wayne
- Bluffton Regional Medical Center
- Kosciusko Community Hospital
- Dukes Memorial Hospital
- RediMed / MedStat
- Lutheran Health Physicians
