= Indianapolis Veterans Administration Hospital =

Historic hospital in Indianapolis, Indiana, U.S.

- U.S. National Register of Historic Places
- U.S. Historic district
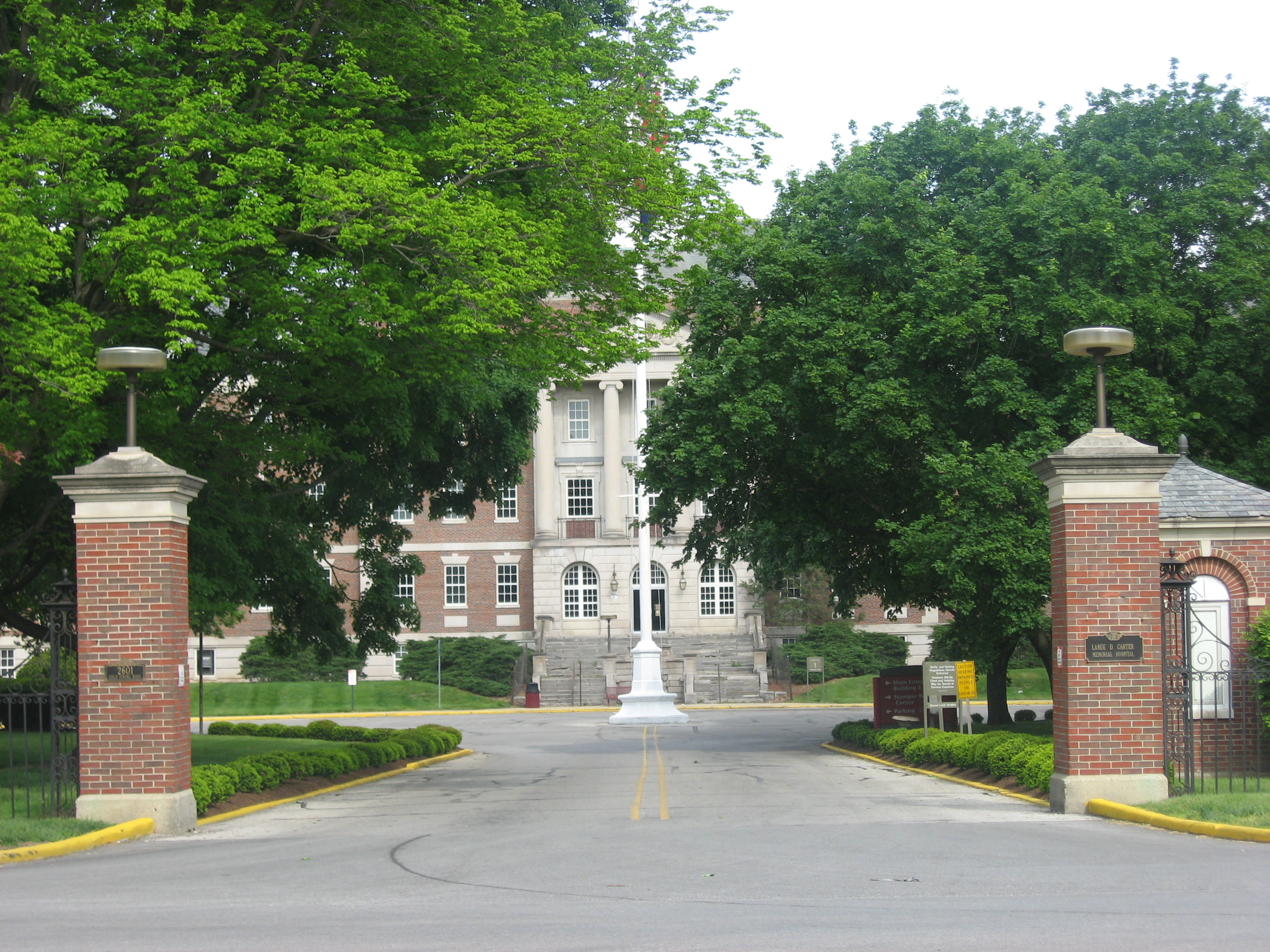
- Indianapolis Veterans Administration Hospital, April 2012

- Location within Indiana Location within the United States
- Location: 2601 Cold Spring Rd., Indianapolis, Indiana, U.S.
- Coordinates: 39°48′10″N 86°12′06″W
- Area: 30 acres (12 ha)
- Built: 1930-1951
- Built by: Construction Division, Veterans Bureau; Construction Division, Veterans Administration
- Architects: Talbert, Randolph
- Architectural style: Colonial Revival, Classical Revival
- MPS: United States Second Generation Veterans Hospitals MPS
- NRHP reference No.: 12000029
- Added to NRHP: February 21, 2012

Indianapolis Veterans Administration Hospital, also known as Larue D. Carter Memorial Hospital is a historic hospital complex and national historic district located at Indianapolis, Indiana, United States. The district resources were developed between 1930 and 1951 by the Veterans Administration, and encompasses 15 contributing buildings, 2 contributing sites, 2 contributing structures and 5 contributing objects on the hospital campus. The main complex is connected by an enclosed corridor and consists of the main hospital building (1931), kitchen/mess hall/boiler house/attendants' quarters, general medical building (1939), and recreation building (1941). The buildings reflect the Colonial Revival and Classical Revival styles of architecture.

The name of doctor Larue D. Carter had previously been attached to the state's first intensive-treatment psychiatric hospital, a facility within a large assembly of buildings (which then also included both the Indiana University Indianapolis campus and the V.A. Hospital), in recognition of his leadership role in the state's Mental Health Association, at a time when the Civil War-era Central State Hospital psychiatric facility, in the same city, was being pilloried as an obsolete relic reflecting inhumane approaches to mental illness.

This V.A. facility was listed on the National Register of Historic Places in 2012.

== See also ==
- National Register of Historic Places listings in Marion County, Indiana
