= Franciscan Health Lafayette =

Franciscan Health Lafayette, formerly Franciscan St. Elizabeth Health, is a member of the Franciscan Health hospital system. Formed in 1998, the organization owns and operates Franciscan Health Lafayette Central and Franciscan Health Lafayette East hospitals, both in Lafayette, Indiana, as well as Franciscan Health Crawfordsville. It formerly operated Lafayette Home Hospital until its closure in February 2010.

The organization is licensed by the Indiana State Board of Health and is a member of the Catholic Health Association of the United States, the Indiana Hospital Association, and the American Hospital Association.

It previously operated as Greater Lafayette Health Services, Inc. (GLHS) and St. Elizabeth Regional Health.
