= Konrad Martin =

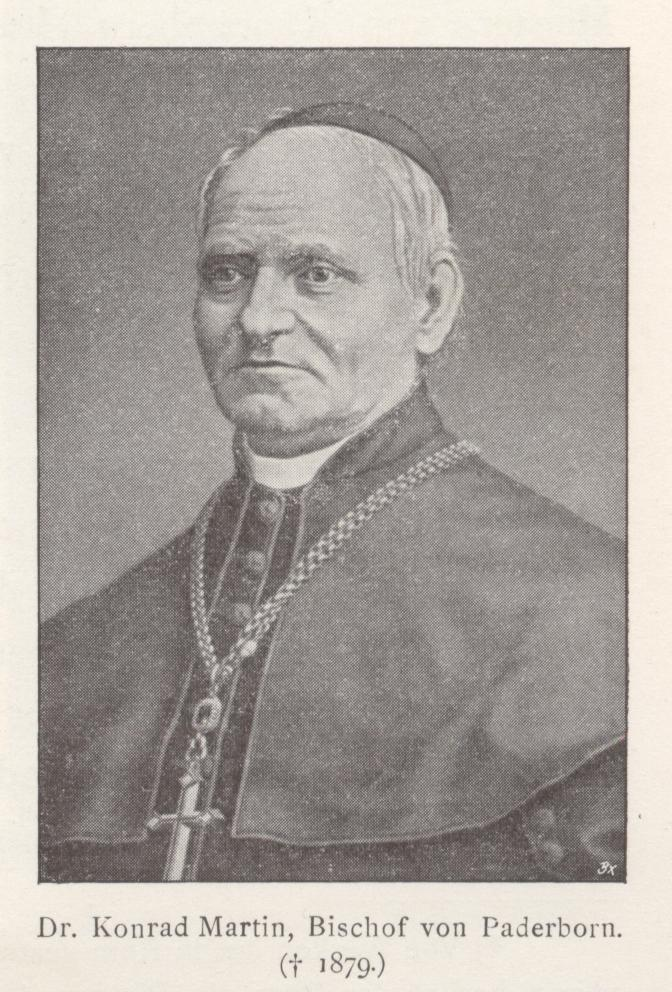
- Konrad Martin
- Title: Bishop of Paderborn

Personal life
- Born: 18 May 1812 Geismar, Province of Saxony
- Died: 16 July 1879 (aged 67) Mont St Guibert, near Brussels, Belgium

Religious life
- Religion: Roman Catholic
- Consecration: 17 August 1856

Senior posting
- Predecessor: Johann Franz Drepper
- Successor: Franz Kaspar Drobe
- Reason for exit: Death

Konrad Martin (18 May 1812, at Geismar, Province of Saxony – 16 July 1879, at Mont St Guibert, near Brussels, Belgium) was a Catholic Bishop of Paderborn.

== Life ==
Konrad Martin studied first under an elder brother who was a priest, and later at the Gymnasium at Heiligenstadt. He studied theology and Semitic languages for two years at Munich under Ignaz von Döllinger and Joseph Franz von Allioli, then went to Halle where the famous Gesenius taught, and thence to Würzburg, where he passed the examen rigorosum for the degree of Doctor Theologiæ. But he was compelled to leave Würzburg, and undergo the same examination in Münster, Westphalia, because the Prussian ministry forbade studying at South German universities and did not recognize their degrees.

In 1835 he obtained in Münster the degree of D.D. Feeling an inclination towards academic teaching which the diocese of Paderborn was unable to satisfy, he entered the archdiocese of Cologne, and as a student of the theological seminary was ordained priest in 1836. Immediately after this he was appointed rector of the "pro-gymnasium" at Wipperfürth, and published, in Mainz, 1839, under the pseudonym Dr. Fridericus Lange, a sharp and forceful pamphlet against Hermesianism, written in classical Latin. The pamphlet created a sensation and caused Geissel, coadjutor of Cologne, to appoint him teacher of religion at the Marzellengymnasium at Cologne in the year 1840. In order to elevate the teaching of religion in the higher schools, he wrote a textbook of the Catholic religion, which appeared at Mainz in 1843 in two volumes and went through fifteen editions. It was used as a textbook in all Prussian gymnasia and translated into Hungarian and French, but later on, during the Kulturkampf, it was suppressed by order of the Prussian minister of education.

Before the end of the same year he was invited by Bishop Dammers of Paderborn to become professor of dogmatic theology in the faculty of his home diocese, but Geissel requested him to remain in Cologne and made him extraordinary professor of theology at the University of Bonn, inspector of the local seminaries, and, with Dieringer, university preacher. In 1848 he became ordinary professor of moral theology and published, in 1850, the Lehrbuch der katholischen Moral which as early as 1865 had gone through five editions.

In 1856 he was elected Bishop of Paderborn, and consecrated by Cardinal Geissel on 17 August. He became one of the most illustrious bishops of Germany. It was his first care to train effective priests. He combined his annual confirmation journeys with detailed investigations. He founded, in 1857, at Heiligenstadt a second seminary for boys and introduced the general examination for priests. In connection with ideas he formed in 1860 during the provincial council at Cologne, he founded with his own money a theological school at Paderborn.

Bishop Martin was a supporter of Pauline Mallinckrodt and instrumental in helping the Sisters of Christian Charity gain papal approval. He asked Maria Theresia Bonzel to form a congregation to work with the poor. The Sisters of St. Francis of Perpetual Adoration in Olpe were approved by the Church on 20 July 1863.

Martin had the satisfaction of holding a diocesan synod at Paderborn in 1867, the first for two centuries; at this synod the resolutions passed at the Council of Cologne were adopted, although in slightly changed form. He established and enlarged the Bonifatius-Verein, of which he was president from 1859 until 1875, and through the assistance of which he was able to found about fifty new missionary posts in neglected districts. He addressed to the Protestants of Germany three friendly brochures entitled: "An episcopal message to the Protestants of Germany, especially to those of my own Diocese, regarding the points of controversy between us" (Paderborn, 1866); "Second Episcopal Message to the Protestants of Germany" (same year); and "Why is there still this gulf between the Churches? An open message to Germany's Catholics and Protestants" (Paderborn, 1869).

At the First Vatican Council he was from the beginning a defendant of the infallibility of the papal office; with him originated the wording of the most important chapter of the final decision.

In 1874, because of his opposition to the Falk Laws, he was sentenced to imprisonment; in the following year he was relieved of his office, by order of the Minister of Worship, and incarcerated in the fortress of Wesel. A few months later, however, he succeeded in escaping to the Netherlands, but was expelled on the demand of the Prussian government. He found a refuge with the Sisters of Christian Charity, who had been banished from Paderborn and who had settled in Mont St. Guibert. From there, as a centre, he governed his diocese through secret emissaries, laboured as pastor and teacher of religion, and wrote several works such as "Drei Jahre aus meinen Leben: 1874-1877" (Paderborn, 1877). Other writings were found among his papers after his death and published by his private secretary, Stamm, in seven volumes, 1882–1890.

He died in exile in Belgium on 16 July 1879. Upon his death, Mother Pauline had his body secretly moved across the border and accompanied it to Paderborn, where the bishop was buried with full solemn honors.

Along with another Catholic theologian, Sebastian Brunner, Martin authored an anti-Jewish tract entitled Blicke in's talmudische Judenthum (1848), which argued that Jews were a source of danger to Christian life. This work went on to have great influence in the antisemitic political agitation of the 1870s, during which Joseph Rebbert published a second edition of it: Blicke in's talmudische Judenthum, nach den Forschungen von Dr. Konrad Martin (Paderborn: Bonifacius, 1876), which was employed for the purposes of political antisemitic propaganda.

== Sources ==
- Stamm, Dr. Conrad Martin, ein bibliographischer Versuch (1892)
- ____, Urkundensammlung zur Biographie (1892)
- ____, Aus der Briefmappe Martins (Paderborn, 1902)
