= Franciscan Health Indianapolis =

Hospital in Indianapolis, Indiana, US

- Franciscan Health
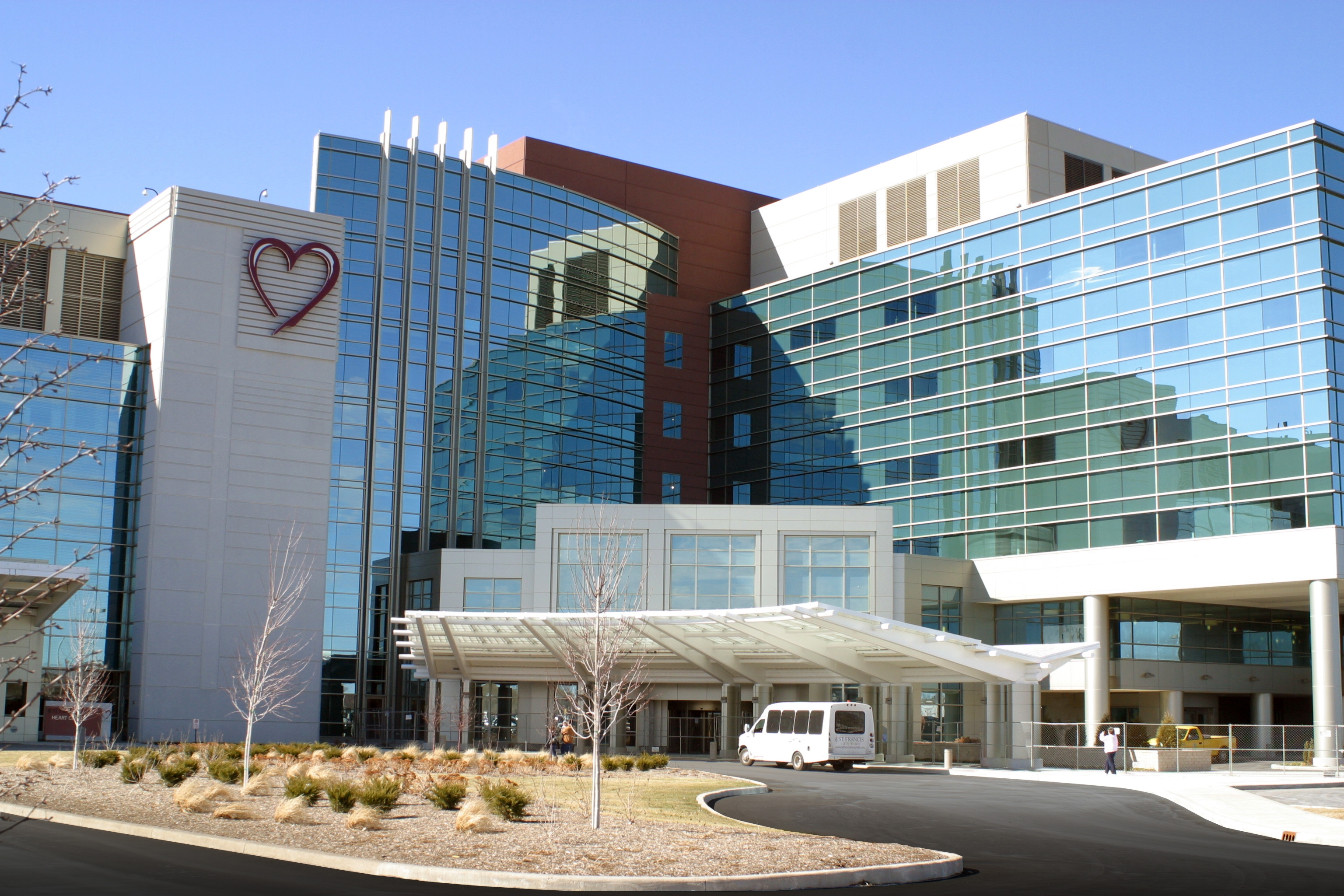
- Franciscan Health Indianapolis main entrance in 2011

Geography
- Location: 8111 S. Emerson Ave., Indianapolis, Indiana, United States
- Coordinates: 39°38′55.6″N 86°04′43.0″W

Organization
- Religious affiliation: Roman Catholic

History
- Former names: Franciscan St. Francis Health; St. Francis Hospital
- Opened: 1914

Links
- Lists: Hospitals in Indiana

Franciscan Health Indianapolis (formerly Franciscan St. Francis Health) is a medical facility serving Carmel, Indianapolis, Plainfield, and south-central Indiana. It is part of the Franciscan Health system.

The hospital has historical affiliations to the Roman Catholic Church and the Sisters of St. Francis of Perpetual Adoration.

== History ==
In 1909, The Sisters of St. Francis were invited by Reverend Francis Gavick to organize a new hospital in Beech Grove, Indiana. After 5 acres (2.0 ha) of land was purchased for one thousand dollars at the corner of Albany Street and 17th Avenue, two Sisters arrived to supervise the construction of the new hospital.

In 1913, the cornerstone of St. Francis Hospital was laid. The new hospital was built facing what is 17th Avenue, at a cost of $75,000. St. Francis Hospital was dedicated to care for the sick on July 5, 1914. In the hospital's first year, it treated 63 patients. The original hospital building had 75 beds and housed medical and surgical services, operating room, X-ray and laboratory facilities, pharmacy and emergency department.

During the Great Depression a second wing was added to the south of the original hospital structure. This South Wing was dedicated on January 18, 1931. Housing the new obstetrical department, the wing doubled the capacity of the hospital. The admissions per year more than doubled from 1,805 in 1931 to 4,096 in 1940. The hospital staff in 1940 included over 70 staff doctors and 73 employees.

In 1957, the five-story North building was constructed, increasing bed capacity to 300, and the staff increased to 700 employees. The building housed Indiana's first cobalt treatment for tumors. The North Wing also included a medical library, chapel, maternity department, and surgery department.

In August 1970, the Sisters of St. Francis began the construction of a new eight-story building to be the core of the new St. Francis Hospital Center. Encompassing more than 320,000 square feet (30,000 m^{2}), the capacity of the hospital was increased to 500 beds. The total cost was in excess of 14 million dollars. The new complex consisted of twin patient towers and a base unit to provide the necessary support services. The Bonzel Towers, named for the founder of the Order of the Sisters of St. Francis, provided 200 patient beds. The building to the rear of the patient towers housed the various special ancillary services, including a new 15-bed cardiac care unit and a 12-bed intensive care unit. An emergency department was added. The North Building, constructed in 1957, was incorporated into the Center through the use of enclosed cross-overs.

Completing the plans for the new hospital campus was the Medical Arts Building, located to the southeast of the hospital. The three-million dollar project featured a 400-car self-park garage and five floors of office spaces for physicians. An enclosed ground level passage connected the building to the hospital's Tower Building.

The creation of a special care nursery in 1975 led to the development of what is now a Level III neonatal intensive care unit for the close observation and care of newborns. In 1975, the Radiology Department introduced Ultrasound Laminography to the facility.

In 1991, St. Francis purchased 106 acres (43 ha) near the southeast corner of Emerson Avenue and Stop 11 Road in Franklin Township for the purposes of expansion. Construction began in May 1992 and a new hospital opened on the South Campus in 1995. The project included a specialty medical office building, a primary care/family practice physician office complex and the St. Francis Ambulatory Services and Diagnostics Center. The Ambulatory Services and Diagnostics Center would also house an ambulatory surgical center, an outpatient cancer treatment center, an education center, a women's health services center, radiology (x-ray) and laboratory services, as well as several support services. The St. Francis Heart Center opened in 2005.

In January 2000, the Sisters of St. Francis acquired Kendrick Memorial Hospital in Mooresville, Indiana, now known as Franciscan Health Mooresville. Several expansions followed, including an emergency department. Franciscan Health Mooresville opened its Emergency Department in October 2008.

St. Francis Hospital & Health Centers was renamed Franciscan St. Francis Health in early 2011.

In February 2011, Franciscan Health announced plans to build a $23 million short-stay medical center in Carmel, Indiana. Franciscan Health Carmel opened in April 2012. Franciscan Health also announced it was acquiring the Visiting Nurse Service Inc. in May 2011. Visiting Nurse Service had been founded in 1913.

Franciscan Health Indianapolis announced plans in 2008 to consolidate services from its Beech Grove to its Indianapolis campus upon completion of an inpatient bed tower in 2011. The first phase of the tower construction opened in April 2011. The Beech Grove hospital closed all inpatient and emergency services in March 2012. Outpatient services are still available.

In January 2012, Franciscan Health Indianapolis' cancer services announced it was joining a collaboration with the International Genomics Consortium, whose work ultimately will lead to advancements in the diagnosis and treatment of cancer.

Franciscan Health Indianapolis is part of a network of 14 hospital campuses in Indiana and Illinois owned and operated by the Franciscan Health (formerly Sisters of St. Francis Health Services, Inc. and later, Franciscan Alliance).

== Locations ==
Hospital locations are:

- Carmel: 12188B North Meridian Street, Carmel, Indiana
- Indianapolis: 8111 S. Emerson Ave., Indianapolis, Indiana
- Mooresville: 1201 Hadley Rd., Mooresville, Indiana

== Trivia ==
Actor Steve McQueen was born at the original St. Francis Hospital in Beech Grove in 1930.

== See also ==
- List of hospitals in Indianapolis
