= Franciscan Health Michigan City =

Coordinates: 41.706236°N 86.900764°W

Franciscan St Anthony Health – Michigan City

Geography
- Location: Michigan City, Indiana

Organisation
- Network: Franciscan Alliance

Services
- Beds: 310

History
- Founded: 1904

Links
- Website: Franciscan St Anthony Health – Michigan City

Franciscan Health Michigan City is an acute care hospital located in Michigan City, Indiana. Founded in 1904 by the Sisters of St. Francis of Perpetual Adoration, it is a member of Franciscan Alliance, Inc., a Catholic healthcare system.

== History ==
=== St. Anthony's Hospital ===
1892 – Mullen Hospital, the first hospital in Michigan City, opened on August 24, 1892 but closed in 1894 following the death of its founder, Dr. Alexander Mullen. In 1903 community leaders approached the Sisters of St. Francis of Perpetual Adoration, who ran St. Elizabeth Hospital in Lafayette, to build a hospital in Michigan City. St. Anthony's Hospital was founded, funded in part by a donation in the name of Mrs. John H. Barker. The cornerstone was laid in 1903.

The original structure, built in 1904, could accommodate twenty-five patients. In 1924, a four-story, 100-bed building was constructed. The hospital was expanded in the 1950s; a new five-story building was added in 1968. In 1974, the sisters of the eastern province incorporated their healthcare ministry under the name of the Sisters of St. Francis Health Services, Inc.

In 1978 the original building was demolished and replaced. In 1996, Memorial Hospital was merged with Franciscan St. Anthony, but subsequently closed. During the early 2000s a parking garage was added.

=== Franciscan St Anthony Health – Michigan City ===
In November 2010, Sisters of St. Francis Health Services, Inc., changed its name to "Franciscan Alliance, Inc." In September 2016, Franciscan Alliance renamed its healthcare facilities using “Franciscan Health” and location, rather than the names of saints.

=== Franciscan Health Michigan City ===
In May 2016 groundbreaking was held for a new Franciscan St. Anthony Health Hospital on a site near Interstate 94. Old St. Anthony's closed in 2019. In 2020, Franciscan Health indicated plans to tear down much of the original building and repurpose the former hospital site. Franciscan expressed its intention to renovate the 2001 patient tower and use it for a program for the elderly, and relocate the 14-bed inpatient Behavioral Medicine Unit from the new campus to the original site. The health system says plans are to keep the emergency department and parking garage. An ExpressCare clinic will continue to operate out of a portion of the previous emergency department.

In 2018 Franciscan Health helped sponsor a new community garden in the Eastport Neighborhood. Walker Park Community Garden is a joint effort of Franciscan Health Michigan City and Purdue Extension. Land was donated by the Michigan City Parks and Recreation Department.
