= Hermann von Mallinckrodt =

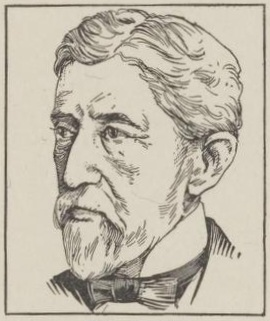
Hermann von Mallinckrodt

Hermann von Mallinckrodt (5 February 1821 – 26 May 1874) was a German parliamentarian from the Province of Westphalia.

== Biography ==
He was born at Minden, into the German nobility, as the eldest child of Detmar von Mallinckrodt (1769–1842), a politician and an Evangelical, and his wife, the highly accomplished and pious Marianna Berhardina Katharina von Hartmann (1787–1834), a Catholic. Hermann's father was Vice-governor at Minden (1818–1823) and also at Aachen (1823–1829). He had a brother and two sisters, one being Pauline von Mallinckrodt. Hermann von Mallinckrodt attended the gymnasium at Aachen and studied law at Berlin and Bonn. He became auscultator in the district court of Paderborn in 1841, referendar at Münster and Erfurt in 1844, and government assessor in 1849. As such, he worked at Minden, Erfurt, Stralsund and Frankfurt (Oder). At Erfurt, he was also for a time commissary to the first burgomaster, and in recognition of his services, he received the freedom of the city. In 1859, he was appointed assistant in the Ministry of the Interior, and in 1860, was appointed government councilor at Düsseldorf. In 1867, he was sent to Merseburg against his will, and was pensioned off at his own request in 1872.

As early as 1852, the Westphalian constituency of Beckum-Ahaus had elected him to the Prussian House of Representatives, and he took part in the founding of the "Catholic Fraction" for the defense of the rights and liberties of the church, which from 1859 was known as the Centre Party. When the House of Representatives was dissolved in 1863, owing to the debate on the military law, Mallinckrodt lost his mandate. In 1867, however, he was elected to the Constituent Diet of the North German Confederation, and in 1868 returned to the Prussian Lower House.

In the North German Diet, he was the leading member of the federal constitutional union. In 1837, he made a speech condemning the war against Austria (1866) and the annexation of the Kingdom of Hanover and the Electorate of Hesse, and attacked the idea of substituting a single (federal) government for the confederation of states. From 1870 until his death, he stood at the head of the Centre Party, in both the Reichstag and the Prussian Landtag, that party gaining strength during the Kulturkampf. He shared leadership with the brothers August and Peter Reichensperger and after 1872, also with Ludwig Windthorst.

Mallinckrodt was an unrivaled parliamentarian. "Never", to repeat the words of a colleague, "was so much force and dignity, energy and learning, strength of character and prudence, piety and vigor, united in one person as in Hermann von Mallinckrodt." Distinguished and dignified in appearance, as tactful as he was winning in society, clear in his thoughts, honorable in his dealings, of spotless life, and moreover a strong and highly cultivated mind, a mature and grave, though good-natured and friendly, character, and an orator who carried his audience with him by his force, lucidity, and fire — with all this he could not but be eminent in every sphere upon which he entered. Whatever he believed to be right, that he advocated with all his power; and he won the esteem of even his most determined opponents. Even Herr Falk, the Minister of Worship, with whom he had often enough been in conflict, called him "the most honorable member of the Centre Party, a man who had only lived and fought for his convictions." And the president of the Prussian Diet, von Bennigsen, also a vigorous antagonist, said: "In spite of his resolute party attitude, he succeeded in gaining and retaining not only the confidence of his political friends, but also the high regard of his political opponents."

While he was always an energetic orator, willingly listened to, he rose to the height of his eloquence in the Kulturkampf. Mallinckrodt took the leading part in the defense of the Catholic Church, to which he was highly devoted. Windthorst's sparkling wit and August Reichensperger's Ciceronian swing he had not. His speeches, on the other hand, are distinguished by a full command of the subject, lucidity of form, and strictly logical argument. Reichensperger said of him that in a parliamentary career of forty years, he had never known a parliamentarian as serious and conscientious in the preparation of his speeches as Mallinckrodt. The keen force of his words was lauded by his opponents. He spoke for the last time on 19 May 1874, and concluded with the poetical words: Per crucem ad lucem (Through the cross to light). Death carried him away only a few days after. During all the years of his parliamentary career, hardly a bill of leading importance had been considered without his taking a distinguished part in the debate.

Mallinckrodt had seven children together with his first wife, Elizabeth (née von Bernhard), of whom two died young; his second wife, her half-sister, had but three months of married life with him, and when his children had grown up, she became a religious.

His sister, Pauline Mallinckrodt, was the foundress of the Sisters of Christian Charity.

He died in Berlin.
