= William Moore (chemist) =

American chemist

William Earl Moore
- Born: 1941; Tuscaloosa, Alabama
- Died: 10 December 2020 (age 79)
- Education: Southern University; Purdue University
- Scientific career
- Workplaces: Southern University; Prairie View A&M University; Texas Southern University
- Thesis: The Effects of Reversible Denaturation on the Population Distribution of Bovine Serum Albumin (1967)
- Doctoral advisor: Joseph F. Foster

William Earl Moore (1941 - 10 December 2020) was an American chemist. He was the first African American to graduate from Purdue University with a PhD in chemistry. Moore was a faculty member at Southern University for more than three decades.

== Early life and education ==
Moore was born in born in Tuscaloosa, Alabama, in 1941.

Moore attended Southern University in Baton Rouge, Louisiana, for his undergraduate studies. He completed his bachelor's degree in chemistry there in 1963. In 1967, Moore received a PhD in physical biochemistry from Purdue University, making him the first Black person to do so in the history of the university.

His PhD thesis was titled "The Effects of Reversible Denaturation on the Population Distribution of Bovine Serum Albumin" and was submitted in August 1967. His doctoral advisor was Joseph F. Foster, and Moore also thanked Dr. Vandon E. White in his acknowledgements. White was chair of the department of chemistry at Southern University, and has been lauded for his work supporting Black students pursuing graduate studies in chemistry. Moore also began his thesis with a quotation from Bertrand Russell.

== Career ==
In the late 1960s, Moore joined the faculty of Southern University, his alma mater where he had completed his undergraduate studies. Within five years, Moore achieved the rank of full professor.

In 1973, Moore became the first president of Southern University's faculty senate. While at Southern, in 1975, Moore took a yearlong absence to consult 34 historically Black colleges and universities on developing programs in interdisciplinary studies. In 1981, he served as chairman of the General Research Support Review Committee at the National Institutes of Health.

A year later, in 1982, Moore was hired as academic vice president, Distinguished Professor of Chemistry, and director of Title III programs at Prairie View A&M University in Prairie View, Texas. In 1985 he left Prairie View to take on the role as academic vice president and chief academic officer at Texas Southern University in Houston, Texas.

In 1989, Moore returned to Southern University as vice chancellor for academic affairs.

== Personal life ==
William Moore was married to Willa Moore, who worked at Lafayette Home Hospital while Moore was a grad student at Purdue. They had two children.

== Awards and honors ==
In 2006, the Purdue Board of Trustees established the William E. Moore Distinguished Professor of Earth and Atmospheric Science and Chemistry and named Joseph S. Francisco as the first to hold this appointment. Other awards include:

- Invited lecture at the Pasteur Institute in Paris, France (1978)
- Outstanding alumni, Purdue University (2004)
- Distinguished alumni, College of Science, Purdue University (2010)
- Honoree for distinguished commitment and service, Southern University Alumni Federation (2014)
