= Saint Clare's Hospital =

Saint Clare's Hospital may refer to:

- Saint Clare's Hospital at Boonton Township, New Jersey
- Saint Clare's Hospital (Manhattan), New York
- St. Clare Medical Center, the 1999–2010 name of Franciscan Health Crawfordsville, Indiana
