= Luise Hensel =

German poet

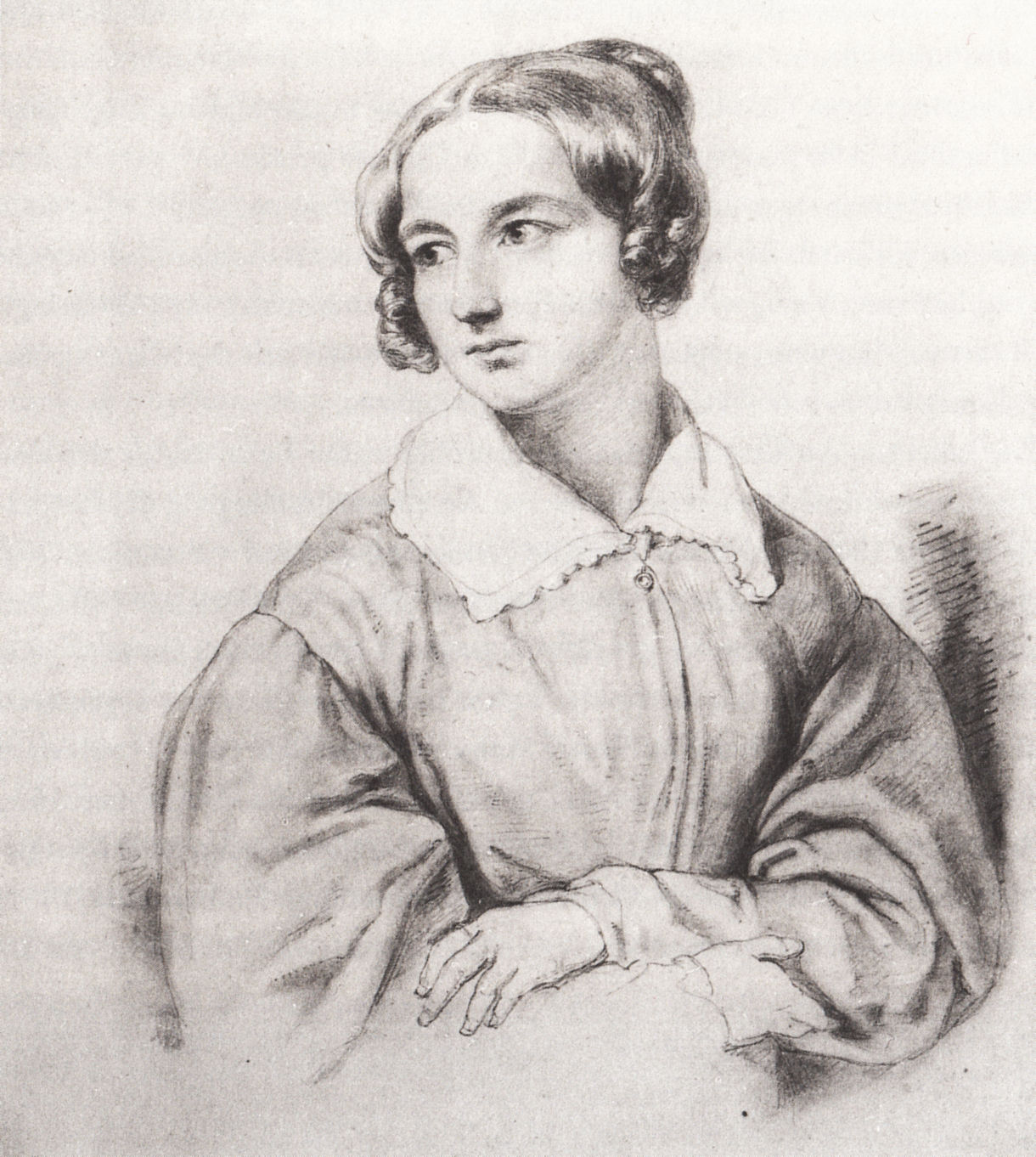
A hand-drawn portrait of Luise Hensel.

Luise Hensel (30 March 1798 – 18 December 1876) was a German teacher and religious poet, who influenced the romantic style of her friend and fellow poet, Clemens Brentano.

== Life ==
Luise Hensel was the sister of Wilhelm Hensel and the sister-in-law of his wife and composer Fanny. She was born on March 30, 1798. Her father, Johann, was a Lutheran minister at Linum, a small town in the Margravate of Brandenburg, Kingdom of Prussia. After the death of her father, in 1809, Luise's mother with her son and three daughters returned to her hometown, Berlin. Luise attended the high school (Realschule), now the Elisabethschule, where she showed extraordinary talent.

Around 1816, she met the poet Clemens Brentano, who called her "the angel in the wilderness". Hensel influenced the romantic style of Brentano quite significantly; Brentano wrote the following to his brother in 1817: "These songs (referring to twenty songs sent to him by Hensel) at first broke my heart, causing me to burst into tears, their truth and simplicity striking me as the holiest that man could produce." Like Brentano, the composer Ludwig Berger held an unrequited love for Hensel.

Another author, Wilhelm Müller, was also unlucky in love with Hensel. The story of this unfulfilled love is recorded in two works composed by Franz Schubert, the song cycle Die schöne Müllerin (English: The pretty mill-girl) and Winterreise (English: Winter Journey). The love of another man, casual friend Ludwig von Gerlach, who would later become a teacher of Otto von Bismarck, led to Hensel enjoying a high place within the Centre Party, a powerful political party in Germany at the time. This conflicted with her religious feelings, and on 8 December 1818, in the Hedwigskirche, Berlin she joined the Catholic Church.

These circumstances weighed heavily on Hensel, and in 1819, she left Berlin. She entered into the service of Princess Mimi Salm-Reifferscheidt-Krautheim, traveling first to Münster, and eventually to Düsseldorf. In Münster, under the influence of religious teacher Bernhard Overberg, her convictions deepened. Later, on March 6, 1820, she took a vow of virginity.

For a number of years, she was companion to the Princess Salm of Munster. In 1821, she took a job as a teacher for the widow of the poet Count Friedrich Leopold zu Stolberg in the town of Sondermühlen, where she stayed until 1823. While there she came to the end of her religious development, and decided to take her foster son and move. They moved to the small Westphalian town of Wiedenbrück, where she enrolled him in the local boys' school. They lived a quiet life in the town until the year 1827.

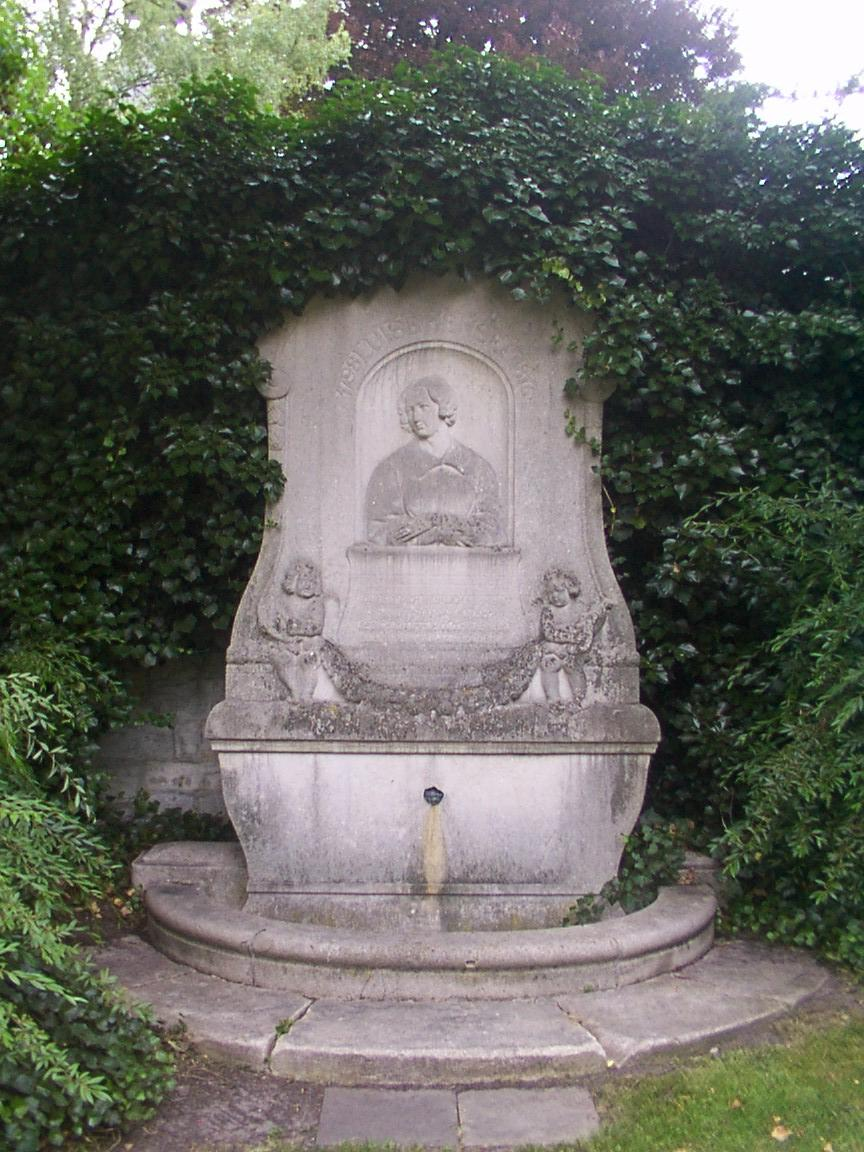
A monument to Luise Hensel in Paderborn.

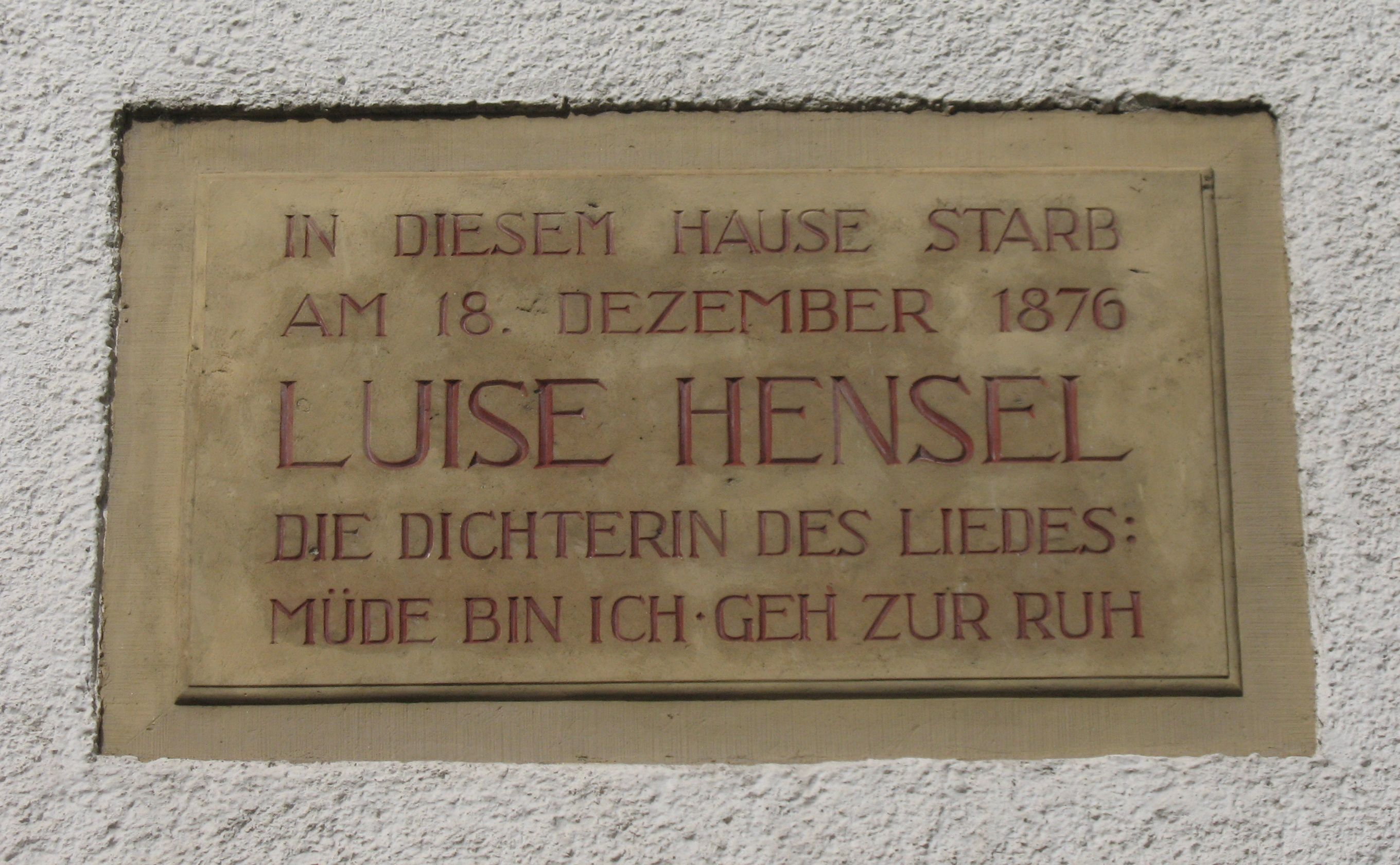
Memorial inscription in Paderborn

She began teaching at Saint Leonard's Academy in Aachen, where she taught for six years, teaching, among others, the eventual founder of the "Sisters of the Poor Children of Jesus," Clara Fey. In 1826, Pauline Mallinckrodt, foundress of the Sisters of Christian Charity, became one of Luise's students. In 1833 Luise returned to Berlin to care for her aged mother.

Her religious convictions were once again tested by love, this time in the form of a marriage proposal from a doctor, Clemens August Alertz, who would later become the personal physician to Pope Pius IX. She continued to teach, and writing religious poems, moving several times. She spent her last years in Paderborn with her former pupil Pauline Mallinckrodt, at the convent of the Sisters of Christian Charity, where she died on December 18, 1876, at the age of 78.

== Works ==
Her "Gedichte" (English: Poems), which include some work by her sister, Wilhelmine, were published in 1858, and show a wistful piety on the part of Hensel, a prime example of German religious poetry. Two more books, compilations of her songs and poems, were published: "Lieder" (English: Songs) in 1869, and her last work, "Briefe der Dichterin Luise H." (English: Letters of the poet Luise H.), posthumously in 1878. Catherine Winkworth translated Immer muss ich wieder lesem as Ever Would I fain be Reading. One of her most well-known poems, "Müde bin ich" (English: I am tired), appears below in its original German, and an English translation. A looser English translation of this by Frances Ridley Havergal is entitled Now the Light Has Gone Away.

=== Müde bin ich ===
Original German:

Müde bin ich

Müde bin ich, geh' zur Ruh',
Schließe beide Äuglein zu;
Vater, laß die Augen dein
Über meinem Bette sein!

Hab' ich Unrecht heut' gethan,
Sieh' es, lieber Gott, nicht an!
Deine Gnad' und Jesu Blut
Machen allen Schaden gut.

Alle, die mir sind verwandt,
Gott, laß ruh'n in deiner Hand!
Alle Menschen, groß und klein,
Sollen dir befohlen sein.

Kranken Herzen sende Ruh',
Nasse Augen schließe zu;
Laß den Mond am Himmel steh'n
Und die stille Welt beseh'n!

English Translation:

I am tired

I am tired, go to bed,
Close both little eyes;
Father, let your eyes
Be over my bed!

If I have done wrong today,
Don't look at it, beloved God!
Your mercy and Jesus’ blood
Turn all damage into good.

All those who are close to me,
God, let them rest in your hand!
Let all people, small and large,
Be under your protection.

Send rest to sick hearts,
Let teary eyes be closed;
Let the moon stand in the sky
And look upon the quiet world!
