= Lafayette Home Hospital =

Hospital in Indiana, US

Coordinates: 40°25′06.0″N 86°52′07.6″W

Home Hospital logo

Lafayette Home Hospital was a 270-bed medical center in Lafayette, Indiana, United States, owned by the not-for-profit Franciscan Health, a division of Sisters of St. Francis Health Services, Inc. The facility ceased all medical services on February 25, 2010.

== History ==
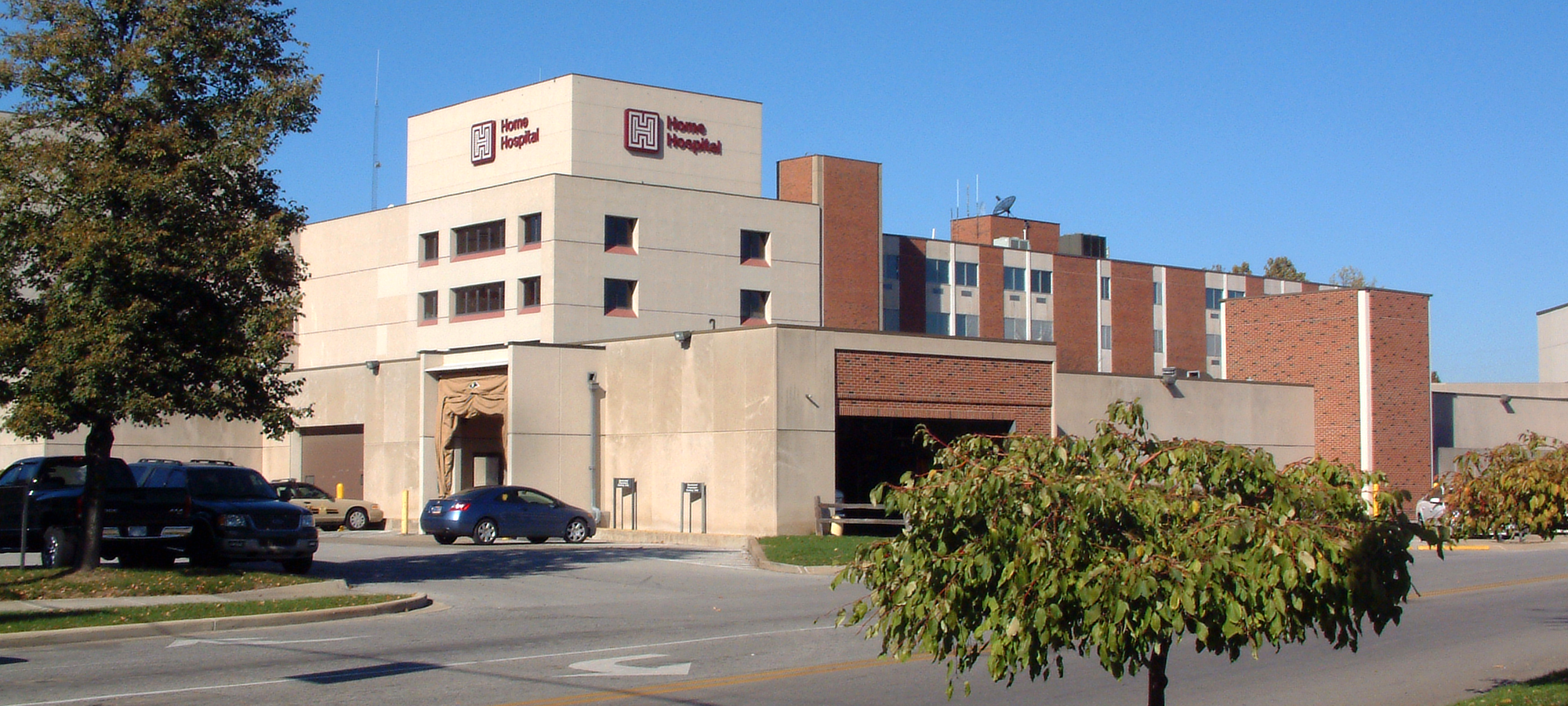
The hospital's southeast corner, 2007.

=== Founding ===
Home Hospital originally began in a house at the corner of 16th and Howell streets, adjacent to the current Franciscan Health Lafayette Central campus. It was known as "The Home for the Friendless," a place where care was provided for homeless residents. At their board meeting in November 1894, the board voted to use the home and all of its belongings as a hospital, as many other community organizations began serving homeless and destitute residents. They voted to rename the facility, "City Hospital," which never caught on with residents, who kept going back to the name "Home." On June 16, 1895, Lafayette Home Hospital was officially incorporated as a non-profit entity with 21 local residents serving on the board of directors. As part of the group's fundraising activities, they offered to name the hospital after any local benefactors. "If any generous and public spirited lady or gentleman wishes to hand his or her name down to posterity as a benefactor or to erect a monument that will be lasting and grand by contributing sufficient money to build the proposed institution, it will be possible to change the name, so as to honor the donor," was one report in the Lafayette Journal & Courier from June 1895. (A date of July 22, 1895 appears on the paperwork approved by the Secretary of State.) While no benefactors stepped forward to change the name, several community members and groups stepped forward to provide supplies, funds and eventually land for Home Hospital.

According to the Journal & Courier in a special 1945 edition about Home Hospital, the first patient was Miss Mary Smith – who later married Robert Orr, who lived at 923 N. 8th St. "On the morning of Mrs. Orr’s operation, she recalls that all patients ate together, after which the dining room table was cleared for action and the surgery performed. The hospital then is said to have had one nurse, an assistant who also kept house, and a cook. There was room for eight patients and the place was like a home, with the staff and patients forming one happy family."

As their services grew, the board was looking for a new location. After much debate, thoughts of building at Seventh and Union streets were abandoned. In early 1898, a Hospital Ladies’ Aid Society was established as a way to continue to raise funds for various needs at the hospital. In October 1898, the board purchased a half block of land at 24th and South streets – 3 acres of land – across from Columbian Park, which many people called "out in the country." The land included a farm house, which would serve as the new hospital. The purchase was secured in part by the sale of the old property.

In 1901, one of the first benefactors for Home Hospital stepped forward with a gift. John P. Kile, a retired merchant from Lafayette, donated funds and built a new two-story brick building in memory of his wife Elizabeth. The building would be known as the Kile Building, but the organization would still continue to be known as Home Hospital. The new building would have rooms for 24 patients and administration. In December 1905, a third floor was added onto the Kile Building. Mrs. Charles B. Stuart, one of the managers of the hospital, gave Home Hospital an early Christmas gift by donating the rest of the block to the hospital and now its property extended to 25th Street. Throughout the next 40 years, the community continued to provide donations that enabled Home Hospital to expand, both in facilities and property. The Kile Building was continually used until it was demolished in 1981.

=== Expansion ===
In the mid-1950s, a group of community leaders gathered and met with both administration and boards of Home Hospital and St. Elizabeth to plan for the future. After about three years of study, the group made its intentions known on April 15, 1959: to provide funding to build 100 beds at Home Hospital and 100 beds at St. Elizabeth, as well as provide equipment and space for ancillary services. The group launched a campaign called HEALTH: Help Enlarge Adequately Lafayette's Two Hospitals.

According to the April 16, 1959 edition of the Journal and Courier, the Tippecanoe County Medical Society recognized "the critical shortage of hospital facilities in Greater Lafayette, Tippecanoe County and the surrounding area, sought the assistance of the Greater Lafayette Chamber of Commerce in obtaining expansion of Home and St. Elizabeth Hospitals." A report was issued by the HEALTH committee by Dr. Herman Smith and Associates – a hospital consultant – emphasizing the need for improvement and expansion at both facilities. The reason why the hospitals needed to be modernized: expansion and growth in the community, especially with new industries and a growing student population at Purdue. The more than $3 million campaign was launched with four goals in mind: to address the existing shortage of hospital beds; the greater demand for beds and other hospital facilities that would accompany population growth; the need for replacement of outmoded facilities; and the improvements necessary for the hospitals to keep pace with the continuing advancements in medical science. The HEALTH campaign went to build a new four-story wing for 100 beds, a new lobby and administrative area, new emergency department, physical medicine department, central medicine supply department, X-ray suite, operating rooms and laboratories at Home Hospital.

The 1970s brought additional advancements in technology and services to Home Hospital. The hospital, which had 365 beds, 35 bassinets and nine isolettes, celebrated the launch of the neonatal intensive care unit in July 1975. Other happenings from 1975 included the Auxiliary providing $59,242.96 to Home Hospital, a bulk of that from the Home Hospital Fair, the gift shop and other events. Their main goal was to complete their pledge of $500,000 for the building fund. The report also included that "Home Hospital’s Red Coats, the first all-male organization of hospital volunteers in the world, celebrated their 10th anniversary."

Construction and changes in services continued through the 1980s and 1990s. Home Hospital continued to experience patient growth. The result: the addition of the new front lobby, patient rooms and ancillary service areas, parking garage and other areas. In 1984, a corporate restructuring created a family of corporations united by a single goal: doing whatever was necessary to maintain Home Hospital as a vibrant, community-owned hospital. North Central Health Services (NCHS) became the new name and parent company of Home Hospital and several other ventures. In 1990, in preparing for its 100th anniversary as Home Hospital, it launched a massive remodeling and modernization project. On September 26, 1997, Home Hospital and St. Elizabeth officials announced that the two entities intended to combine the governance and management in a new corporation. The unified hospital system – originally called Greater Lafayette Health Services (GLHS) – would work to be more efficient and more responsive to those who purchase and consume health care. Some of the benefits of creating the new system would be to eliminate waste and reduce the duplication of expensive technology. They officially merged on January 1, 1999.

=== Closure ===
Greater Lafayette Health Services announced in late 2005 a plan to close Home Hospital, and construct a new facility to replace it on the city's southeast side, with St. Elizabeth Medical Center remaining open for critical patient care. Work on the new facility commenced in late 2006, with occupation planned to occur in December 2009. Lafayette Home Hospital closed in February 2010; the property was sold in 2012 to an Indianapolis-based group of investors, Columbian Park Redevelopment LLC. The building was demolished in 2013.

== See also ==
- Franciscan Health Lafayette East
