= Pauline Mallinckrodt =

German nun

Blessed Pauline Von Mallinckrodt S.C.C. Foundress of the Sisters of Christian Charity
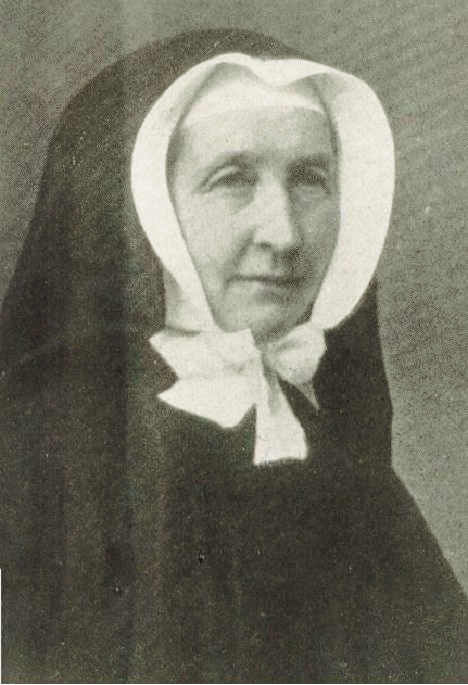

Religious
- Born: 3 June 1817; Minden, North Rhine-Westphalia, German Confederation
- Died: 30 April 1881 (aged 63); Paderborn, North Rhine-Westphalia, German Empire
- Venerated in: Catholic Church
- Beatified: 14 April 1985, Saint Peter's Square, Vatican City by Pope John Paul II
- Feast: 30 April
- Attributes: Religious habit
- Patronage: Sisters of Christian Charity

Pauline von Mallinckrodt, SCC (3 June 1817 - 30 April 1881) was a German noblewoman and the foundress of the Sisters of Christian Charity, a Catholic religious institute.

Born into the aristocratic Mallinckrodt family as the daughter of a Lutheran father and Catholic mother, from her adolescence she began to tend to the blind and sick. This venture expanded into what became a religious congregation which spread at a rapid pace; she herself traveled to a range of places to oversee its growth and development. She died in 1881 and was beatified on 14 April 1985.

== Life ==
Pauline von Mallinckrodt was born into the German nobility, as the eldest child of Detmar von Mallinckrodt (1769–1842), a politician and an Evangelical, and his wife, the highly accomplished and pious Marianna Berhardina Katharina von Hartmann (1787–1834), a Catholic. Her father was Vice-governor at Minden (1818–23) and also at Aachen (1823–29).

The distinguished parliamentarian Hermann Josef Christian von Mallinckrodt (05.02.1821-26.05.1874) was her younger brother as was Georg Detmar Ignaz Franz Daniel Wilhem von Mallinckrodt (c.1819-21.03.1881) and sister Bertha von Mallinckrodt. Her father was Lutheran; her mother a devout Catholic; Pauline was baptized as "Maria Bernardine Sophia Pauline".

In 1826 her father was transferred to Aix-la-Chapelle where Mallinckrodt attended Saint Leonard's school. Her classmates included Clara Fey and Mary Frances Schervier; one of her teachers were Luise Hensel. In the fall of 1832 she continued her studies at a French school in Liège. Following a tour through Switzerland in 1833 with her parents she returned to Aix-la-Chapelle. Upon her return from Switzerland her parents wanted her to integrate into aristocratic circles and, despite finding social functions a distasteful affair, she did so. Her mother grew ill to the point where Pauline accompanied her to a health resort in Bad Schwalbach.

Upon her mother's death from typhus in 1834 Mallinckrodt, at seventeen, took over the management of her father's household and the education of her three little siblings. Mallinckrodt received her Confirmation in August 1835. In 1840 her father retired from public service to his manor at Boeddekken near Paderborn and it was at this stage she entertained notions of becoming a Vincentian Sister. In 1835 her father paid for her to have a trip to Paris and in 1836 she accompanied her paternal uncle, Bernard von Hartmann, and his wife on a trip across Belgium to places such as Louvain and Brussels; she also visited the site of the Battle of Waterloo. The poor of the village would ask her to tend the sick. In winter she and her father lived in Paderborn where there was a women's group that tended the sick in their homes and she soon joined this group. In 1840 the group opened a kindergarten to provide safekeeping and care for neglected children and placed it in her charge. From this developed an institution for blind children who were provided a home in a former Capuchin convent where she took up residence after the death of her father in 1842; she was at his bedside as he died. In 1842 she did the Spiritual Exercises for the first time.

In 1846 she went to Paris to induce Madeleine Sophie Barat to place the Paderborn institution for the blind under the care of Barat's congregation. However, because the Prussian government would not permit a French-run religious order to operate in Prussia she found it prudent to establish her own order - the Sisters of Christian Charity - on 21 August 1849 and she was vested in the habit. Mallinckrodt was chosen as the order's first Mother Superior. Her profession was held on 4 November 1850. It spread at a rapid pace that in the time before the Kulturkampf (1871–78) - which saw a brief suspension of its growth - it ran 20 establishments and had 250 members in various parts of the nation. In 1867 she fell ill and was directed to refrain from work prompting the religious to keep her workload limited. The order soon spread in the United States of America and first settled in New Orleans; she arrived in the United States herself on 7 June 1873 to open their motherhouse and oversee further expansion. In 1874 she was at her brother Hermann's bedside as he died.

For a long time she wanted to visit Rome to see the pope and to visit the tombs of the Apostles; she left on 27 April 1876 and at the end of the month met Pope Pius IX during a public audience; he stopped to speak with her for a minute. She also visited the tomb of Saint Peter and attended a Mass in Saint Peter's Basilica before leaving. En route back home she stopped off in Loreto and also went to the Italian cities of Bologna, Padua, Venice and Trieste while also stopping off in Vienna and Prague.

In 1875, the government passed a law authorizing the government to take over administration of land and other properties that religious communities possessed. Therefore, she moved the motherhouse to Belgium. In 1875 Bishop Konrad Martin was incarcerated in the Wesel fortress because of the Falk Laws. A few months later he succeeded in escaping and found refuge with the order at the new motherhouse in Mont St. Guibert. Upon his death in 1879 she accompanied his remains in secret across the border to Paderborn where the bishop was buried with full solemn honors. On 1 October 1879 she traveled to Chile and was suffering from poor health at the time which made the trip hard; she left Chile on 19 February 1880. From there she travelled via Panama to the United States to New York to visit new houses that had opened and arrived on 26 March 1880 - Good Friday - with Sister Christostoma before leaving on 21 August and arriving home on 3 September.

On 25 April 1881 she caught a chill and a fever as her condition grew worse - her sisters confined her to bed but she preferred to rest on a sofa. The fever increased and she became restless in the night. Mallinckrodt died from pneumonia on 30 April 1881 at 9:00am in Paderborn. In 1960 her order had 2650 religious operating across Europe and other continents.

=== Establishments ===
Her religious order owns and operates the "Haus Pauline von Mallinckrodt" retirement home in Paderborn.

The "Mallinckrodt Scholars Program" for undergraduates at the "Ann Ida Gannon, BVM, Center for Women and Leadership" at Loyola University Chicago is named in her honor and focuses on developing leadership reflecting Mallinckrodt's spirit of compassion and action in its students.

== Beatification ==
The beatification cause started in an informative process in Paderborn that spanned from 1926 until 1933. Her writings received theological approval on two occasions: on 6 December 1942, and a decade later on 23 December 1952; the formal introduction to the cause came on 29 May 1958 under Pope Pius XII and she became titled as a Servant of God. The Congregation for the Causes of Saints approved it on 14 December 1982. Pope John Paul II approved her life of heroic virtue and named her as Venerable on 13 January 1983.

The miracle for beatification was investigated on a diocesan level and it received C.C.S. validation sometime later. Medical experts approved this miracle on 8 March 1994 and theologians likewise approved it on 26 June 1984 as did the C.C.S. on 6 November 1984. John Paul II approved this miracle on 14 December 1984 and beatified her several months later on 14 April 1985. The second miracle for her to be sainted was investigated in Detroit from April to 30 May 2006 and was validated on 12 January 2007.

The current postulator for this cause is Dr. Andrea Ambrosi.
