= Sisters of the Living Word =

The Congregation of the Sisters of the Living Word are a Catholic religious congregation founded in 1975 when Annamarie Cook and ninety sisters branched off from the Sisters of Christian Charity to form a separate community.

The archives of the Sisters of the Living Word are held at the University of Notre Dame Archives.

== History ==
The aftermath of the Second Vatican Council saw many religious communities re-evaluating their roots and the particular charism of their founders. In the summer of 1975, the Sacred Congregation for Religious and Secular Institutes found that the Sisters of Christian Charity and the group of sisters led by Provincial Superior Annamarie Cook held very different views of religious life. The solution was for the latter to separate and form a distinct congregation.

== Living Word Center ==
Traditionally, most congregations have what is known as "motherhouses." There was no way the new Community could establish that kind of headquarters for administration purposes. In the first year of foundation, the Leadership Team and the administrative staff of the SLW moved into a partially used convent at St. Juliana Parish, Chicago. By 1981, a search for a more permanent site began. An intensive investigation led to the 1985 purchase of Ridge School, a closed public school in Arlington Heights, Illinois. A massive reconstruction project was completed in 1990 and the Leadership Team and administrative staff moved into the Living Word Center in February, 1990. In the summer of 2021, the sisters closed the Living Word Center, as it was too large for their needs and relocated their offices to Des Plaines, Illinois.

== Formal approval ==
The Constitution Committee led the congregation through the various stages of writing. The final draft, written by Annamarie Cook, was sent to Rome. On August 6, 1992, Cardinal Joseph Bernardin, Archbishop of Chicago, presented the Sisters of the Living Word their document of final approval as a religious community in the Roman Catholic Archdiocese of Chicago. During the Liturgy, each Sister received her copy of the Constitutions and renewed her vows as a member of the newly approved Community. The day was a culmination of seventeen years of shared vision.

The Leadership Team is made up of three sisters, elected by the congregation, who serve for a term of five years.

== Apostolate ==
In the beginning, the founding members continued to work in education. By 1977, others reached out to the abused, the illiterate, the elderly and the homebound. The sisters work with AIDS patients, promoting peace, counseling teenage mothers, or feeding the hungry. They teach computer classes to senior citizens, tutor Catholic school students, and are active in immigration, pastoral care, social work, spiritual direction, and prison ministry.

In 2019, "We are the Sisters of the Living Word a short film produced by Bitter Jester Studios received an Emmy for lighting at the Chicago Midwest Emmy Awards.

The Sisters are one of the founding members of Faith Community Homes, an organization formed by members of several religious groups, to help families in the northwest suburbs of Chicago avoid homelessness.

In Louisiana, the sisters participate in the "Glass Half Full Project" which collects glass products and recycles them back into sand to replenish Louisiana’s coastline.

As of 2026, there were thirty-three members of the community.
