= Hévillers =

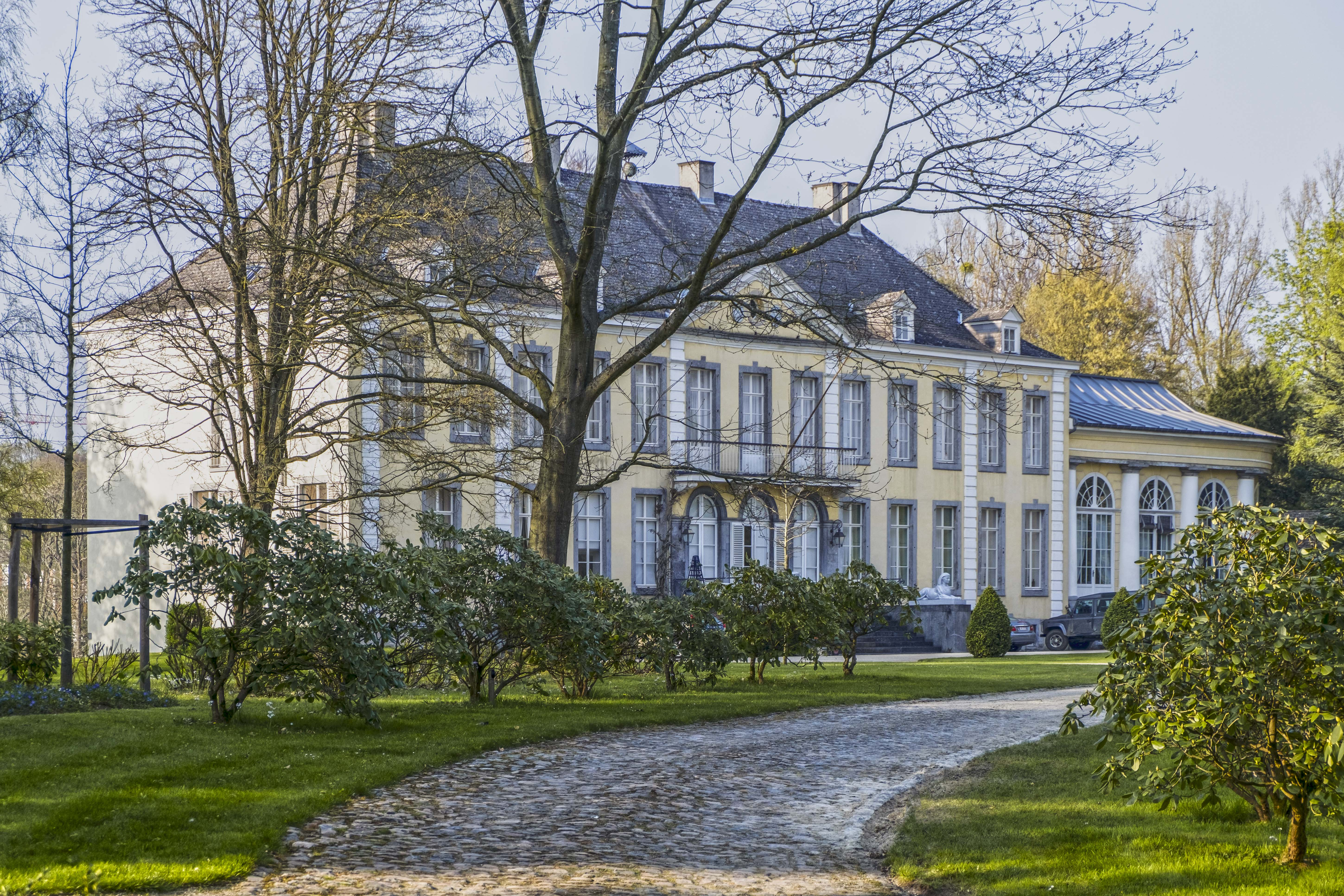
- Château de Bierbais in Hévillers

- Location within Belgium Location within Europe
- Coordinates: 50°37′22″N 04°36′59″E
- Country: Belgium
- Region: Wallonia
- Province: Walloon Brabant
- Municipality: Mont-Saint-Guibert

Hévillers is a village and district of the municipality of Mont-Saint-Guibert, located in the province of Walloon Brabant, Belgium.

The village grew up around the castle and estate of the Château de Bierbais. The castle is located in a large park, and its current appearance dates from reconstruction in the early 19th century in a Neoclassical style. A donjon from the 13th century and the castle chapel, built in a Gothic style, are located nearby.
