= Sister Mary Rufinia =

American painter

Sister Mary Rufinia (born Amalia Mathilde Kloke) (October 24, 1881 – October 10, 1959) was a German-born American nun and painter.

== Life ==
She was born in Kalkum and raised in Kohlschlade, a hamlet near Wissen, where her father worked as forester. Sister Mary Rufinia, a member of the Sisters of St. Francis of Perpetual Adoration, received early art instruction in Berlin before emigrating to the United States, where she began work as a nurse at St. Elizabeth Hospital in Lafayette, Indiana, in 1906. After a back injury suffered while lifting a large patient onto a bed in 1920 she gradually abandoned nursing for painting, eventually becoming a teacher.

From 1930 to 1931 she studied at the School of the Art Institute of Chicago, where she received a bachelor of fine arts degree. In 1936 she studied with Wayman Adams, before receiving her master of fine arts degree from Syracuse University in 1938. She also studied at DePaul University and the Cleveland School of Art, and took lessons under V. J. Cariani.

She taught in Lafayette for many years, both privately and at St. Francis High School, where she taught watercolor painting, pottery, and sculpture. She also wrote for School Arts Magazine. She exhibited widely during her career, including at numerous Hoosier Salons, and won a number of prizes as well. A collection of her work is in the Art Museum of Greater Lafayette, which mounted an exhibition dedicated to her work in 2011.

Sister Mary Rufinia favored still lifes and religious scenes for subject matter, and worked in oil and watercolor. She is best known for her 1936 painting The Old Carpenter.
