= Lucy Wilson Rice =

American painter

Lucy Wilson Rice (March 14, 1874 – March 12, 1963) was an American artist known for her portraits of notable people from Texas and her Texan landscapes.

== Biography ==
Born Lucy Wilson in Troy, Alabama, she graduated from Baylor Female College with a degree in art (1891). She later obtained further art training from Wayman Elbridge Adams, who painted her portrait. She married Charles Donnell Rice in 1895.

In 1900, Rice moved to Austin, Texas, where Charles had a teaching position at the University of Texas. She later lived for a period in Paris before returning to Austin and opening a studio. She stopped painting in 1952 due to failing eyesight.

In addition to landscapes and marine paintings, Rice painted portraits of Vice-President John Nance Garner and Texas governors Dan Moody, Miriam A. Ferguson, and Ross Shaw Sterling. Her work is in the collection of the Texas State Library, the Texas Memorial Museum, and several colleges, among other institutions.
