= Wayman Elbridge Adams =

American painter (1883–1959)

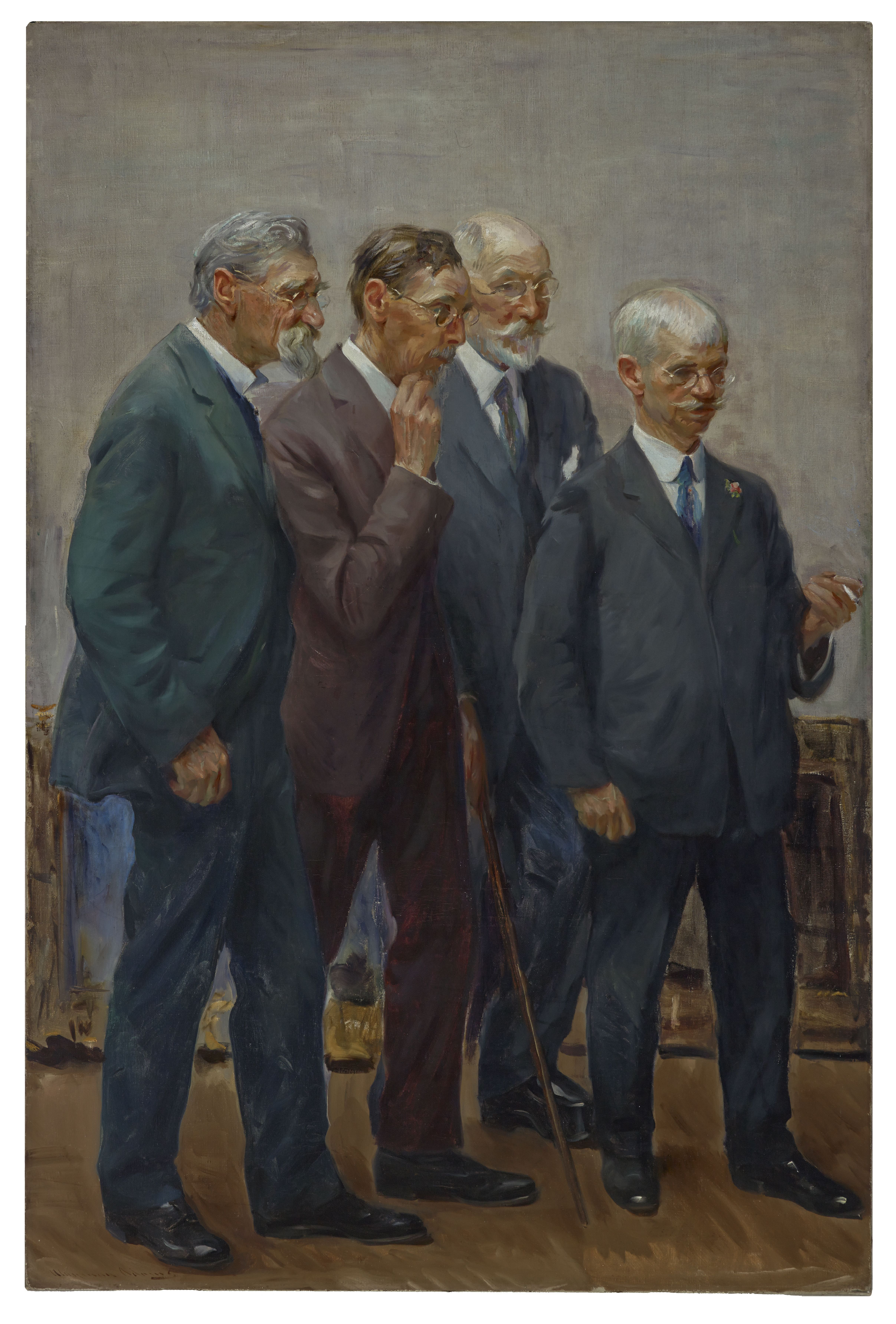
The Art Jury, 1921

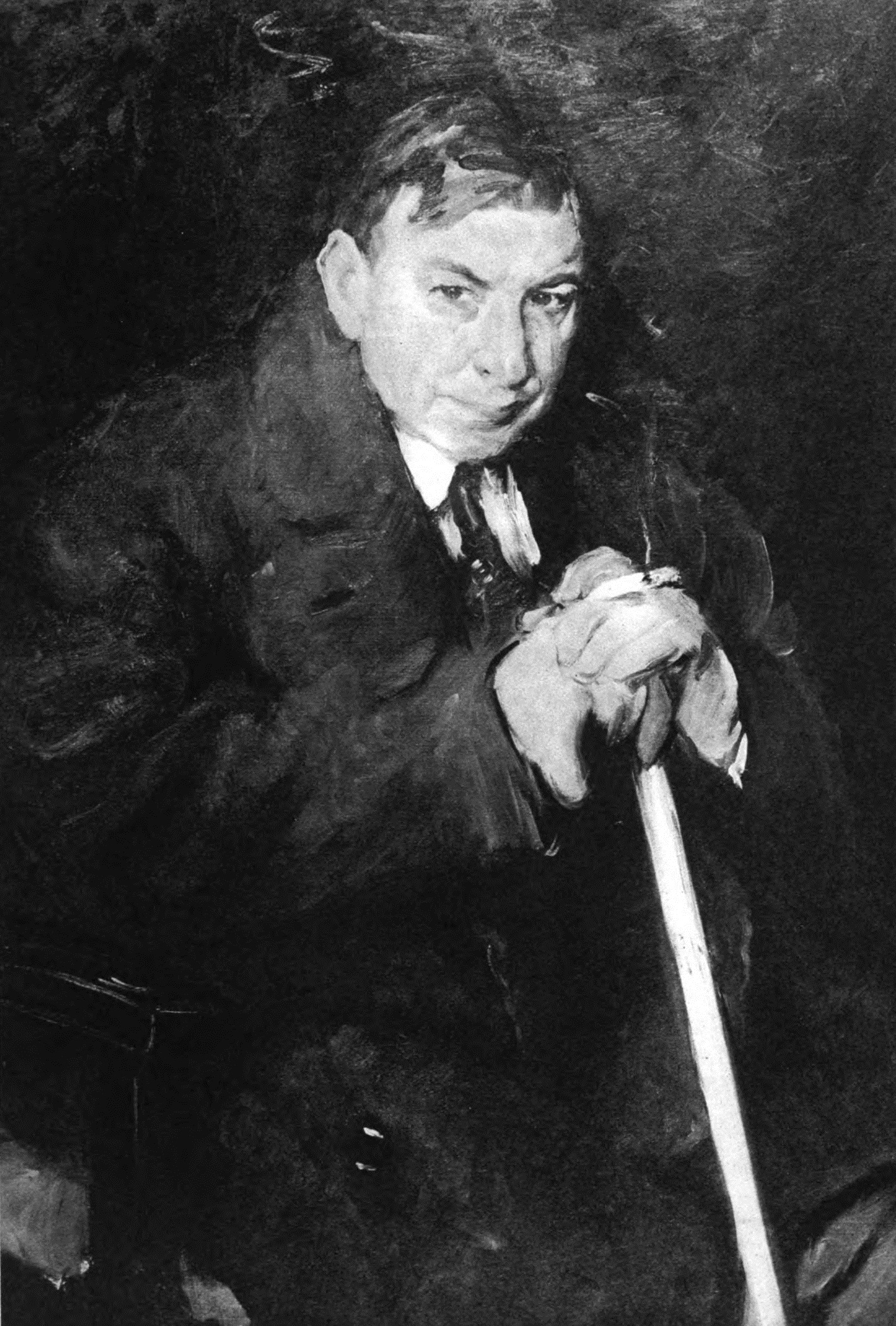
Booth Tarkington, ca. 1914

Wayman Elbridge Adams (September 23, 1883 – April 7, 1959) was an American painter best known for his portraits of famous people. His skill at painting at high speed earned him the nickname "Lightning".

== Life ==
Adams was born in Muncie, Indiana, the son of a livestock breeder. His artistic leanings were notably encouraged by his father who, being an amateur artist himself, enrolled Adams in Herron School of Art in Indianapolis. Thereafter, he continued his studies under the guidance of painter William Merritt Chase in Italy (1910) and Robert Henri in Spain (1912). In Italy, he met artist Margaret Graham Burroughs, and they married in 1918.

On returning to the United States from his European studies, Adams opened a studio in Indianapolis, Indiana. He subsequently lived and worked in New York and California.

Adams and his wife ran a summer art school in Elizabethtown, New York, from 1933 to 1945. Among Adams's pupils were Sister Mary Rufinia and Lucy Wilson Rice.

He died in Austin, Texas at the age of 76.

== Art ==
Adams's mature style – featuring simplified composition, heavy brushstrokes, and patches of vivid color – shows the influence of both his teachers. He became known as a specialist in portraits, and his subjects included four U.S. presidents – Calvin Coolidge, Warren Harding, William Henry Harrison, and Herbert Hoover – the artist Francis Focer Brown, and the writers Booth Tarkington and James Whitcomb Riley. His first important recognition as an artist came in 1918 when he won a Logan prize for his portrait of printmaker Joseph Pennell.

Adams also turned out regional figure studies and street scenes in various media including painting, drawing, and printmaking. One series focuses on the residents of San Francisco's Chinatown, and another on the residents of New Orleans, Louisiana, where he traveled frequently beginning in 1916. A number of the New Orleans works foreground African-American subjects. There are also portraits of notable New Orleans residents, including author Grace King, artist Ellsworth Woodward, and mayor Martin Behrman.

Adams was well known in American artistic circles for his speedy painting technique, which earned him the nickname of "Lightning". His portraits were often completed in one sitting.

He exhibited widely in the United States and had an exhibition at the Musée du Luxembourg in Paris in 1919. In 1921, he was elected an associate of the National Academy of Design.

His work is in the collection of the New Orleans Museum of Art and other institutions. His work was also part of the painting event in the art competition at the 1932 Summer Olympics.

== Awards ==
- National Academy of Design — Proctor prize for portraiture (1914)
- Mr and Mrs Frank G. Logan Prize (1918)
- International Expo, Venice, Italy (1924)
- Greenough Memorial Prize (1925)
- Sesquicentennial Exposition Medal (1926)
- National Academy of Design - first Altman Prize (1926)
- Carnegie Institute Prize (1943)

== Sources ==
- American Art Review - August, 1997 Masterworks of the Adirondacks - Welsch, Caroline M
- American Art Review - December, 2002 - the Herron School of Art Centennial - Warkel, Harriet G.
- Ask Art
