= Franciscan Health Mooresville =

Hospital

Coordinates: 39.6077°N 86.3555°W

Franciscan Health Mooresville in Mooresville, Indiana, traces its roots to a private sanitarium opened in 1881. The Morgan County hospital is home to the Franciscan Health Center for Hip and Knee Surgery.

== Kendrick Memorial Hospital ==
Kendrick Memorial Hospital began in 1880 as a private practice established by Dr. Clark Robbins, specializing in colon and rectal diseases. Clark built a sanitarium in 1900; he died in 1906. The sanitarium continued to operate under his son-in-law, Dr. E. Bert Hadley. Charles Comer became part owner in 1917 and changed the name to Comer Sanitarium. When the sanitarium burned down in 1936, Comer continued the practice from his home. Comer's sons joined the practice and changed the name to Comer Hospital. In 1948 the practice eventually came to Dr. Kenneth Comer, who with his partner, Dr. William Kendrick, renamed the facility the Comer-Kendrick Sanitarium. In 1962 Kenneth Comer left to become Morgan County's State Board of Health officer. Kendrick purchased the sanitarium and changed the name to Kendrick Hospital. He divested himself of the business in 1965.

In 1967 it became a non-profit institution and in 1971 was renamed Margaret Kendrick Memorial Hospital, in honor of Kendrick's mother, who introduced the first doctor's answering service in Indianapolis. Around 1968, due to fire code concerns, Senator Paul Swisher and his wife Louise, a surgical assistant at Kendrick, purchased 30 acres of Johnson's Orchards in Greencastle for the site of a new hospital. Kendrick Memorial Hospital opened on Hadley Road in 1971. The old building was sold and repurposed for business and residential use.

The hospital also developed a specialty in joint replacement. The Orthopaedic Residency Service with the Louisiana State University was established in 1987.

== Franciscan St. Francis Health-Mooresville ==
In 2000, Kendrick Memorial Hospital was sold to Sisters of St. Francis Health Services, Inc. Proceeds from the sale led to the establishment of the Kendrick Foundation, which provides "long-term support for health related programs in Morgan County, with an emphasis on the Mooresville area." The hospital then became known as Franciscan St. Francis Health-Mooresville.

In an effort to diversify services, during the spring of 2008, Franciscan St. Francis Health- Mooresville completed its $42 million expansion, including adding a 34-bed orthopedic inpatient unit, and a 26-bed adult medical-surgical inpatient unit, as well as an eight-bed Intensive Care unit. It also included a new emergency department.

== Franciscan Health Mooresville ==
In November 2010, Sisters of St. Francis Health Services, Inc., changed its name to "Franciscan Alliance, Inc." In September 2016, Franciscan Alliance renamed its healthcare facilities using “Franciscan Health” and location, rather than the names of saints.

In June 2019, Franciscan Health Mooresville announced plans for a further expansion to include a new medical office building.
