= Sisters of St. Francis of Perpetual Adoration =

The Sisters of St. Francis of Perpetual Adoration, also known as the Olpe Sisters, is a Catholic religious institute for women founded in 1863 by Maria Theresia Bonzel in Olpe, Germany. In 1875, they opened St. Elizabeth Hospital in Lafayette, Indiana; now part of Franciscan Health. In 1890, they founded Saint Francis Normal School, a teacher training school; which is now the University of Saint Francis (Indiana).

== History ==
Regina Christine Wilhelmine ("Aline") was born on September 17, 1830. In 1851 she became a member of the Third Order Secular of St. Francis, taking the name Maria Theresia. On July 20, 1863, the community at Olpe was approved by the Bishop Konrad Martin of Paderborn as an independent motherhouse. This date is observed as the founding day of the Congregation.

Their first apostolate was the care of orphans. During the war years of 1870–71, the religious sisters from Olpe cared for eight hundred wounded soldiers. Nonetheless, the Kulturkampf, an anticlerical reaction against the Catholic Church, placed convents under government control, and in 1876 the orphanage was closed.

Anticipating further anti-Catholic measures, Mother Maria Theresia accepted the invitation of Bishop Joseph Dwenger of Fort Wayne, Indiana, to send missionary Sisters to work in his diocese. An American branch was founded by six pioneer nuns who emigrated to Lafayette, Indiana in 1875. By the end of the year, they had established a hospital, St. Elizabeth's. St. Anthony's Hospital in Michigan City, Indiana was founded in 1903.

Over the years, the congregation grew and the sisters opened many new hospitals and schools. They also taught in a number of parochial schools. In 1890 the congregation founded Saint Francis Normal School, a teacher training school; it is now the University of Saint Francis (Indiana).

The sisters minister in the United States, Germany, the Philippines and Brazil. American painter Sister Mary Rufinia was a member of the Sisters of St. Francis of Perpetual Adoration.

== Structure ==
In 1886 the congregation was formally divided into two provinces, the German and the American. The American has since divided into eastern and western provinces, and another has been established in the Philippines.

- St. Elizabeth of Hungary Province, centered in Germany.
- Immaculate Heart of Mary Province, centered at Mount Alverno provincial house in Mishawaka, Indiana
- Mount Saint Francis educational and skilled nursing facilities in Colorado Springs, Colorado
- St. Joseph Province, centered at Mount Saint Joseph provincial house in Colorado Springs, Colorado
- Immaculate Conception Province, centered in Leyte in the Philippines.

== Present day ==
The sisters strive to combine the contemplative life with the active through perpetual adoration and the works of mercy in education, healthcare, and other ecclesial ministries. Members profess vows of poverty, chastity and obedience.

The Sisters of St. Francis of Perpetual Adoration are the founding congregation of Franciscan Health, which operates eleven hospitals serving Indiana and one in Illinois. The sisters of St. Joseph Province sponsor the non-profit Mount St. Francis Nursing Center in Colorado Springs. The parish of St. Francis of Assisi is located on the grounds of the provincial motherhouse.
