= Franciscan Health =

Nonprofit healthcare system in Indiana, U.S.

- Franciscan Alliance, Inc.
- Formation: 1974; 52 years ago
- Type: Nonprofit
- Headquarters: 1515 West Dragoon Trail; Mishawaka, Indiana, U.S.
- Services: Health care
- Affiliations: Sisters of St. Francis of Perpetual Adoration
- Staff: 18,000
- Website: www.franciscanhealth.org
- Formerly called: Sisters of St. Francis Health Services, Inc. (1974–2010)

Franciscan Alliance, Inc., doing business as Franciscan Health, is a Catholic healthcare system, operates. It operates eleven hospitals serving Indiana and one hospital in Illinois and employs over 18,000 full- and part-time employees. Franciscan Alliance is under the sponsorship of the Sisters of St. Francis of Perpetual Adoration, Inc.

== History ==
Mother Maria Theresia Bonzel founded the Congregation of the Sisters of St. Francis of Perpetual Adoration in 1863 in Olpe, Germany. Drawn to the ideals of Francis of Assisi, Mother Theresia cared for poor and neglected children and for persons in need of healthcare. In 1875, she sent sisters to Indiana where the mission grew to include hospitals, schools, orphanages and homes for the aged. St. Elizabeth Hospital, now Franciscan Health Lafayette Central in Lafayette, was the first facility founded by the sisters in America. In 1931 the sisters divided into eastern and western provinces, the eastern centered at Mishawaka, Indiana.

In 1974, the sisters of the eastern province incorporated their healthcare ministry under the name of the "Sisters of St. Francis Health Services, Inc." In 1986, the corporate offices were moved to their current location on the provincialate grounds in Mishawaka.

In November 2010, Sisters of St. Francis Health Services, Inc., changed its name to "Franciscan Alliance, Inc." In September 2016, Franciscan Alliance renamed its healthcare facilities using “Franciscan Health” and location, rather than the names of saints.

In May 2026, Franciscan Health announced plans to build an osteopathic medical school at the Franciscan Health Crown Point campus.

=== Franciscan Alliance Inc. v. Burwell ===
The group joined with eight states in filing a lawsuit against the federal government to vacate portions of Section 1557 of the Patient Protection and Affordable Care Act, which provided protections from discrimination on the basis of gender identity or reproductive choices. They alleged the rule compelled them "to provide gender transition services and abortion services against their religious beliefs and medical judgment".

== Facilities ==
=== Healthcare facilities ===
- Franciscan Health Carmel — Carmel, Indiana (founded 2012)
- Franciscan Health Crawfordsville — Crawfordsville, Indiana (founded 1902)
- Franciscan Health Crown Point — Crown Point, Indiana (founded 1974)
- Franciscan Health Dyer — Dyer, Indiana/Bloom Township, Illinois (founded 1898)
- Franciscan Health Hammond — Hammond, Indiana (founded 1898)
- Franciscan Health Indianapolis — Indianapolis, Indiana (founded 1995)
- Franciscan Health Lafayette East — Lafayette, Indiana (founded 2010)
- Franciscan Health Michigan City — Michigan City, Indiana (founded 1903)
- Franciscan Health Mooresville — Mooresville, Indiana (founded 1881)
- Franciscan Health Munster — Munster, Indiana (founded 1994)
- Franciscan Health Rensselaer — Rensselaer, Indiana (founded 1917)
- Franciscan Health Olympia Fields — Olympia Fields, Illinois (founded 1978; sold 2026)

=== Support facilities ===
- Franciscan Health Information Services — Beech Grove, Indiana
- Tonn & Blank Construction — Michigan City, Indiana

=== Corporate office ===
- The corporate office for Franciscan Health is located at 1515 West Dragoon Trail in Mishawaka, Indiana.
