= Franciscan Health Crawfordsville =

- Franciscan Health
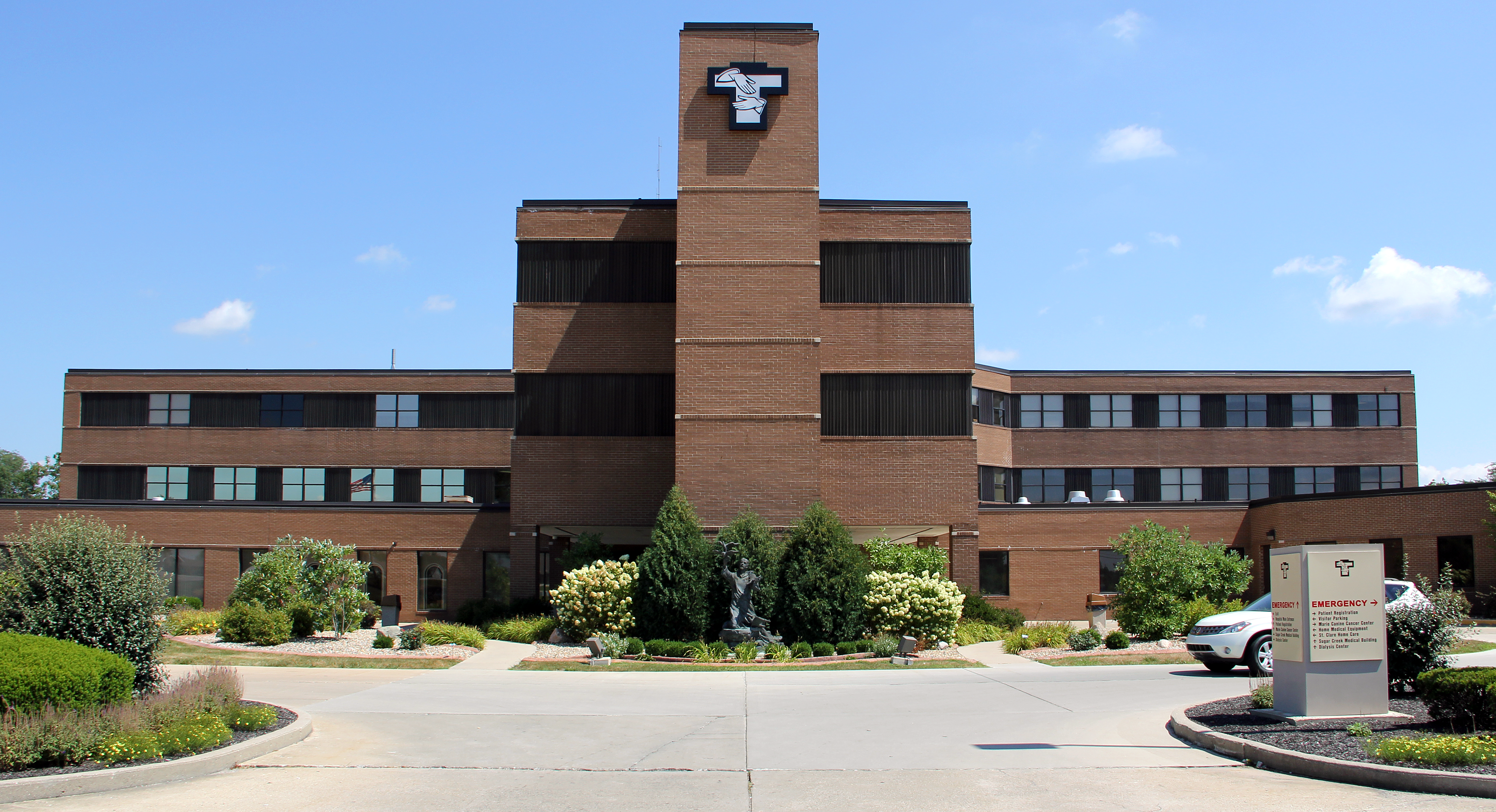
- The front (west) face of the main Franciscan Health Crawfordsville building

Geography
- Location: Crawfordsville, Indiana, United States
- Coordinates: 40.0663°N 86.9058°W

History
- Opened: November 27, 1902 (Culver Union Hospital)

Links
- Website: www.franciscanalliance.org/hospitals/crawfordsville/
- Lists: Hospitals in Indiana

Franciscan Health Crawfordsville is a hospital in Crawfordsville, Indiana and a member of the Franciscan Health hospital system.

== History ==
The hospital was originally established as Culver Union Hospital by the local chapter of the Women's Union, and opened on November 27, 1902. It was operated by the Union Hospital Association until 1927, when it was transferred to the local county. In 1929 the county completed the construction of a new 45-bed building, at which time the original building was converted into a nurses' residence.

From 1939 to 1942 a new building was constructed which connected the two older buildings. The original structure dating from 1902 was condemned in 1950 and a new wing for the hospital was completed in 1966. The county sold the hospital in 1983 to American Medical International. That organization built a completely new facility at the hospital's current location. It opened its doors on June 13, 1984.

In 1999 the hospital was purchased by what was then the Sisters of St. Francis Health Services (now Franciscan Health) and renamed St. Clare Medical Center, after which several expansions to its services were undertaken. In January 2011 the facility was given the name Franciscan St. Elizabeth Health - Crawfordsville, and in September 2016 was renamed again to Franciscan Health Crawfordsville.

== Status ==
Franciscan Health Crawfordsville is licensed by the Indiana State Board of Health and is a member of the Catholic Health Association of the United States and Canada, the Indiana Hospital Association and the American Hospital Association.

== Accreditation ==
- Healthcare Facilities Accreditation Program (HFAP)
- Indiana Board of Pharmacy
- Nuclear Regulatory Commission
- American College of Radiology
- College of American Pathology
