= Franciscan Health Lafayette East =

- Franciscan Health

Geography
- Location: Lafayette, Indiana, United States
- Coordinates: 40.393781°N 86.833978°W

Organization
- Type: General

Services
- Beds: 199 inpatient beds

History
- Former name: Franciscan St. Elizabeth Health - St. Elizabeth East
- Founded: 25 February 2010

Links
- Website: www.franciscanhealth.org/healthcare-facilities/franciscan-health-lafayette-east-62%20franciscanhealth.org
- Lists: Hospitals in Indiana

Franciscan Health Lafayette East, previously known as St. Elizabeth East, is a hospital in Lafayette, Indiana, United States, and part of the Franciscan Health hospital system.

== History ==
Ground was broken for the new hospital in June 2007 and it opened February 25, 2010. Its original name, Franciscan St. Elizabeth Health - St. Elizabeth East, was chosen to distinguish it from the original St. Elizabeth Hospital near downtown Lafayette. In September 2016, Franciscan Alliance adopted the new name Franciscan Health and renamed the facility Franciscan Health Lafayette East.

The acute medical units, intensive care and emergency departments subsequently relocated from St. Elizabeth Hospital/Franciscan Health Lafayette Central to Franciscan Health Lafayette East location. Franciscan Health Lafayette Central no longer offers hospital services.

Construction began in summer 2016 on a new 106,000-square-foot, 52-bed patient tower for the hospital, which opened in 2018.

== Hospital rating data ==
The HealthGrades website contains the latest quality data for Franciscan Health Lafayette East Hospital, as of 2016. For this rating section three different types of data from HealthGrades are presented: quality ratings for twenty-six inpatient conditions and procedures, thirteen patient safety indicators and the percentage of patients giving the hospital a 9 or 10 (the two highest possible ratings).

For inpatient conditions and procedures, there are three possible ratings: worse than expected, as expected, better than expected. For this hospital the data for this category is:

- Worse than expected - 0
- As expected - 21
- Better than expected - 5

For patient safety indicators, there are the same three possible ratings. For this hospital safety indicators were rated as:

- Worse than expected - 1
- As expected - 8
- Better than expected - 4

Percentage of patients rating this hospital as a 9 or 10 - 76% Percentage of patients who on average rank hospitals as a 9 or 10 - 69%
