= Franciscan Health Lafayette Central =

Coordinates: 40.427472°N 86.879449°W

St. Elizabeth Central's logo

Franciscan Health Lafayette Central, previously known as St. Elizabeth Central, was a 155-bed hospital in Lafayette, Indiana, United States, and part of the Franciscan Health hospital system. In the 1980s it was known as St. Elizabeth Hospital. It now houses Franciscan Health Community Education, various medical offices and the St. Elizabeth School of Nursing.

== History ==
=== St. Elizabeth's ===
St. Elizabeth Hospital opened when six members of the Sisters of St. Francis of Perpetual Adoration came from Germany in 1875 in order to care for the sick in Lafayette, Indiana. The hospital opened in 1876 and was expanded in 1885.

St. Elizabeth School of Nursing was launched in 1897 to train members of the order. By 1937, the community's need for nurses had grown so great that the school began admitting lay students. The building also housed St. Francis High School and St. Francis College.

A second wing was added to the hospital in 1921. In 1974, the sisters of the eastern province incorporated their healthcare ministry under the name of the Sisters of St. Francis Health Services, Inc.

In 1998, operation of Lafayette Home Hospital and St. Elizabeth Hospital merged under an equal partnership known as Greater Lafayette Health Services (GLHS). Each hospital retained its long-established identity and traditions. In 2003, the Sisters of St. Francis Health Services became the sole owners of the non-profit corporation, its two hospitals, and related patient care facilities, retaining the name Greater Lafayette Health Services.

Greater Lafayette Health Services announced, in late 2005, plans to close Home Hospital, and construct a new facility to replace it on the city's southeast side, with St. Elizabeth Medical Center remaining open for critical patient care. Work on the new facility commenced in late 2006, with occupation planned to occur in December 2009.

In 2007, the GLHS name was changed to St. Elizabeth Regional Health, and later to Franciscan St. Elizabeth Health.

=== St. Elizabeth Central ===
In June 2009, the hospital was renamed St. Elizabeth Central (formally Franciscan St. Elizabeth Health - Lafayette Central) as part of the expanded reuse plan for the facility. The St. Elizabeth Central name was chosen to distinguish the location from the new eastside location.

=== Franciscan Health Lafayette Central ===
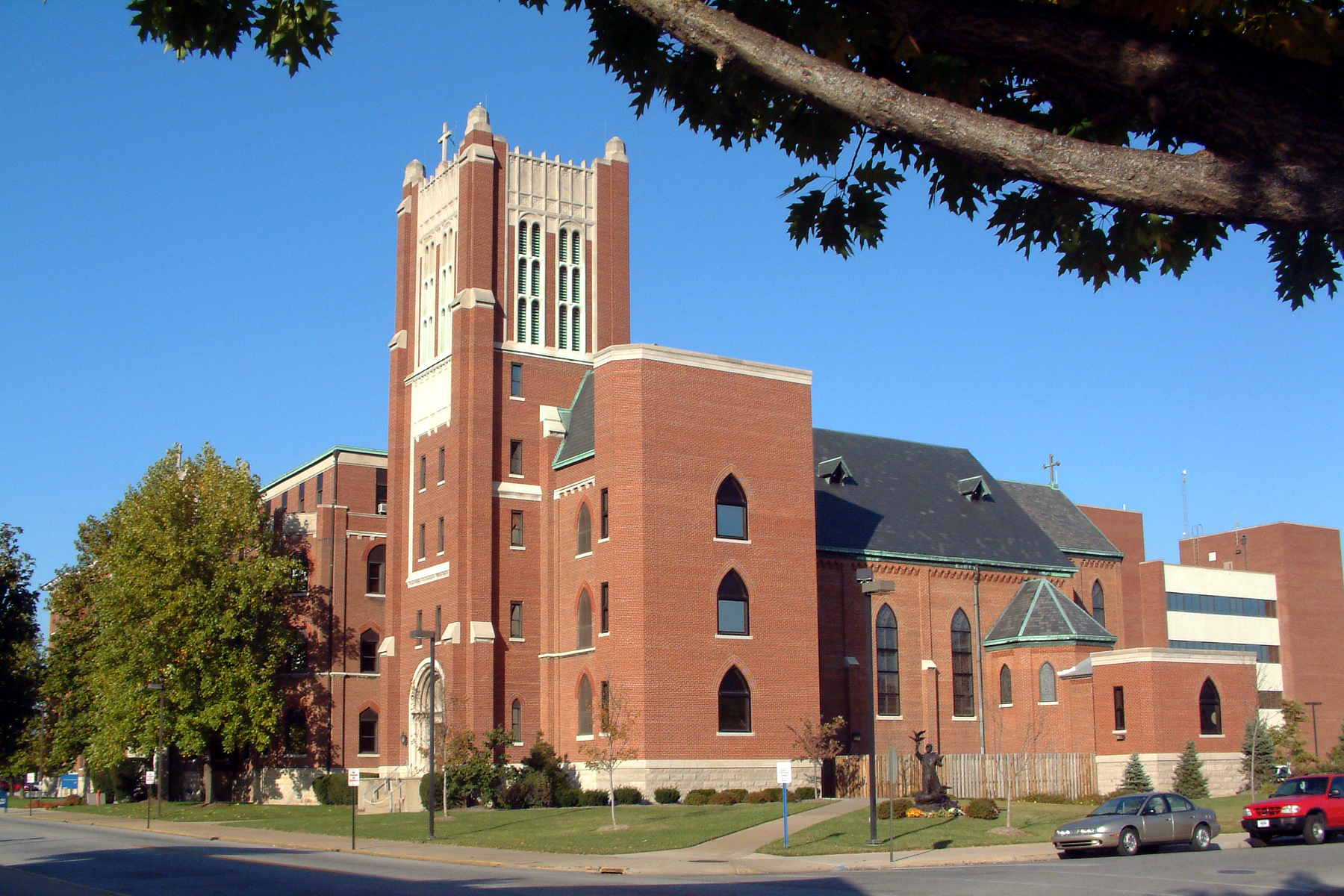
The former hospital at 14th and Tippecanoe Streets.

The acute medical units, intensive care and emergency departments subsequently relocated to the system's Franciscan Health Lafayette East location. In September 2016, Franciscan Alliance adopted the new name Franciscan Health and renamed the hospital to Franciscan Health Lafayette Central. The site no longer offers hospital services.

The nursing school moved across the street in 2017, part of the ongoing consolidation. Today, the Lafayette Central campus is home to the Healthy Living Center, Community Education, St. Elizabeth School of Nursing and more.

== Chapel ==
St. Francis Chapel at St. Elizabeth's has Eucharistic Adoration, 24 hours a day, seven days a week. Masses are held Monday through Friday at 7:00 AM, and at 9:00 AM on Saturdays, Sundays, and Holy Days.
