= Mont-Saint-Guibert =

Municipality in Walloon Brabant province, Wallonia, Belgium

- Municipality
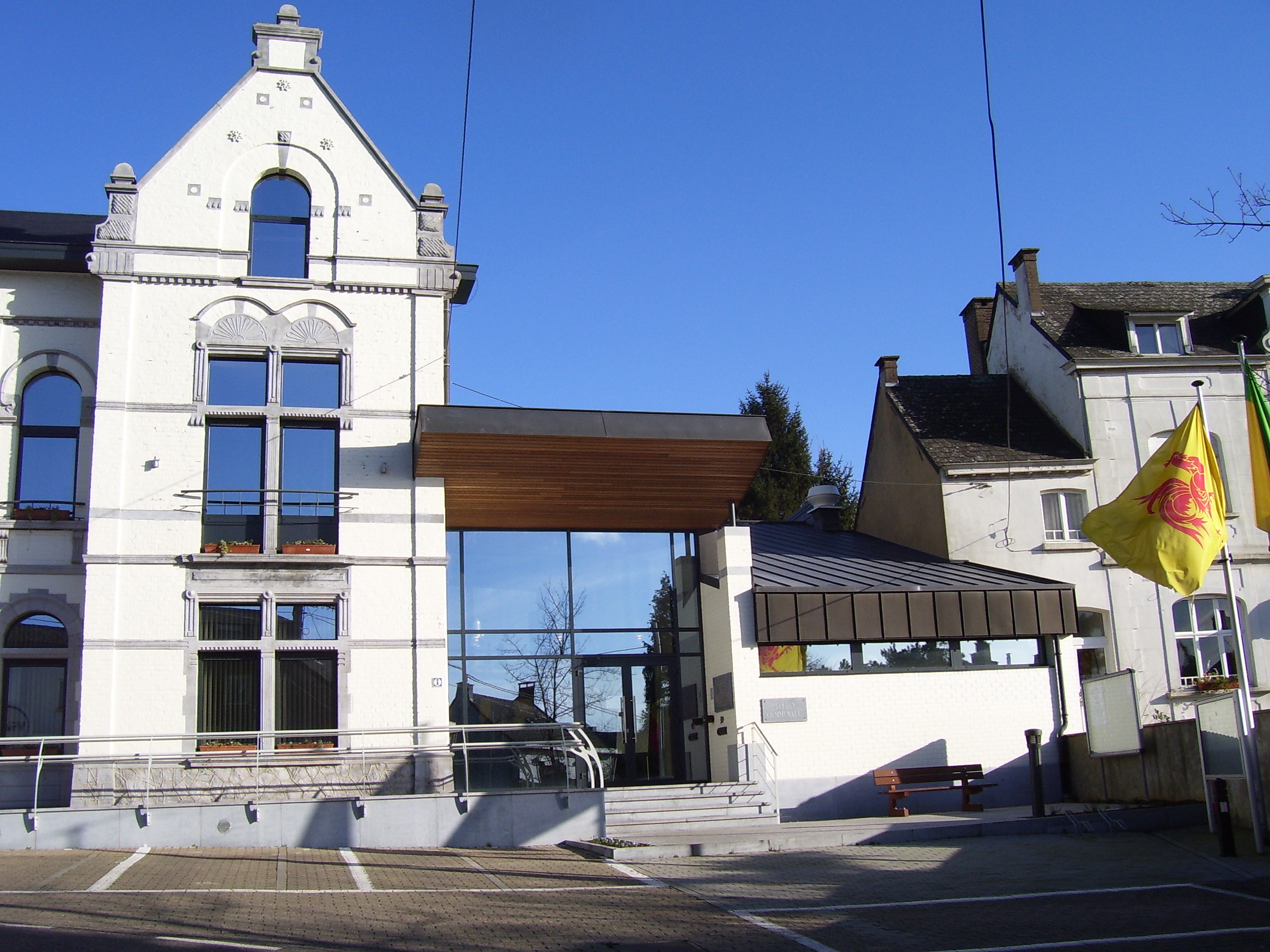
- Mont-Saint-Guibert town hall

- Flag Coat of arms

- The municipality of Mont-Saint-Guibert in Walloon Brabant
- Interactive map of Mont-Saint-Guibert
- Location in Belgium
- Coordinates: 50°38′N 04°37′E
- Country: Belgium
- Community: French Community
- Region: Wallonia
- Province: Walloon Brabant
- Arrondissement: Nivelles

Government
  - Mayor: Julien Breuer
  - Governing party: Mont-Saint-Guibert Cohésion

Area
  - Total: 18.72 km^{2} (7.23 sq mi)

Population (2018-01-01)
  - Total: 7,562
  - Density: 404.0/km^{2} (1,046/sq mi)
- Postal codes: 1435
- NIS code: 25068
- Area codes: 010
- Website: www.mont-saint-guibert.be

Mont-Saint-Guibert (French pronunciation: [mɔ̃ sɛ̃ ɡibɛʁ]; Walloon: Mont-Sint-Wubert) is a municipality of Wallonia located in the Belgian province of Walloon Brabant. On January 1, 2012, Mont-Saint-Guibert had a total population of 7000. The total area is 18.63 km^{2} (7.19 sq mi) which gives a population density of 344 inhabitants per square kilometre (890/sq mi).

In addition to Mont-Saint-Guibert itself, the municipality includes the villages of Corbais and Hévillers.

Before the owners of Stella Artois brewery bought the business, Leffe beer was brewed in the village along with Vieux Temps. The brewery was subsequently closed and production was moved to Leuven in the Flemish part of the country.

The commune is now fast developing with the arrival of many commuters who have moved from the capital city of Brussels. They are served by a local station and the nearby E411 Brussels to Luxembourg highway.

Monuments

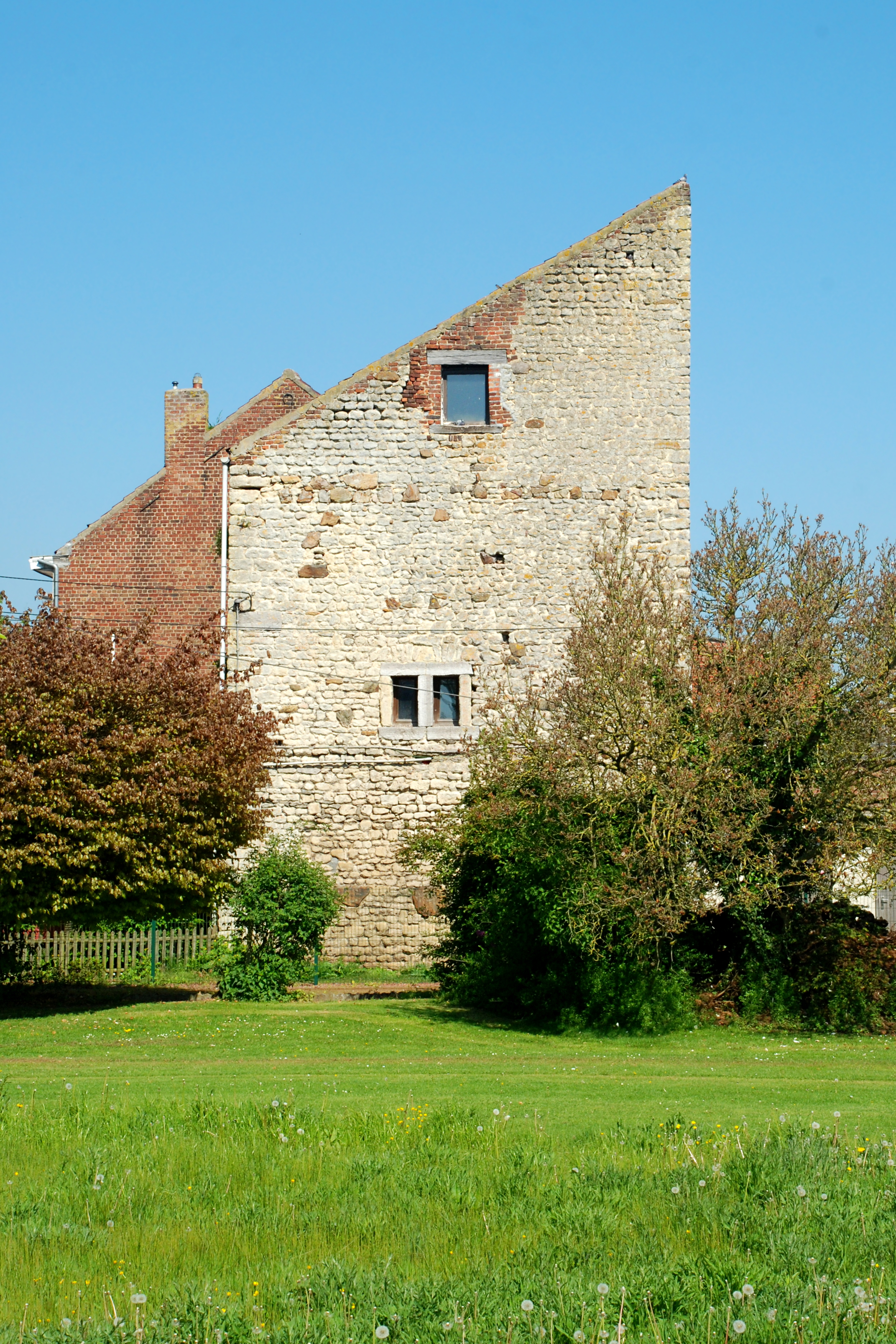
Griffon du Bois Tower

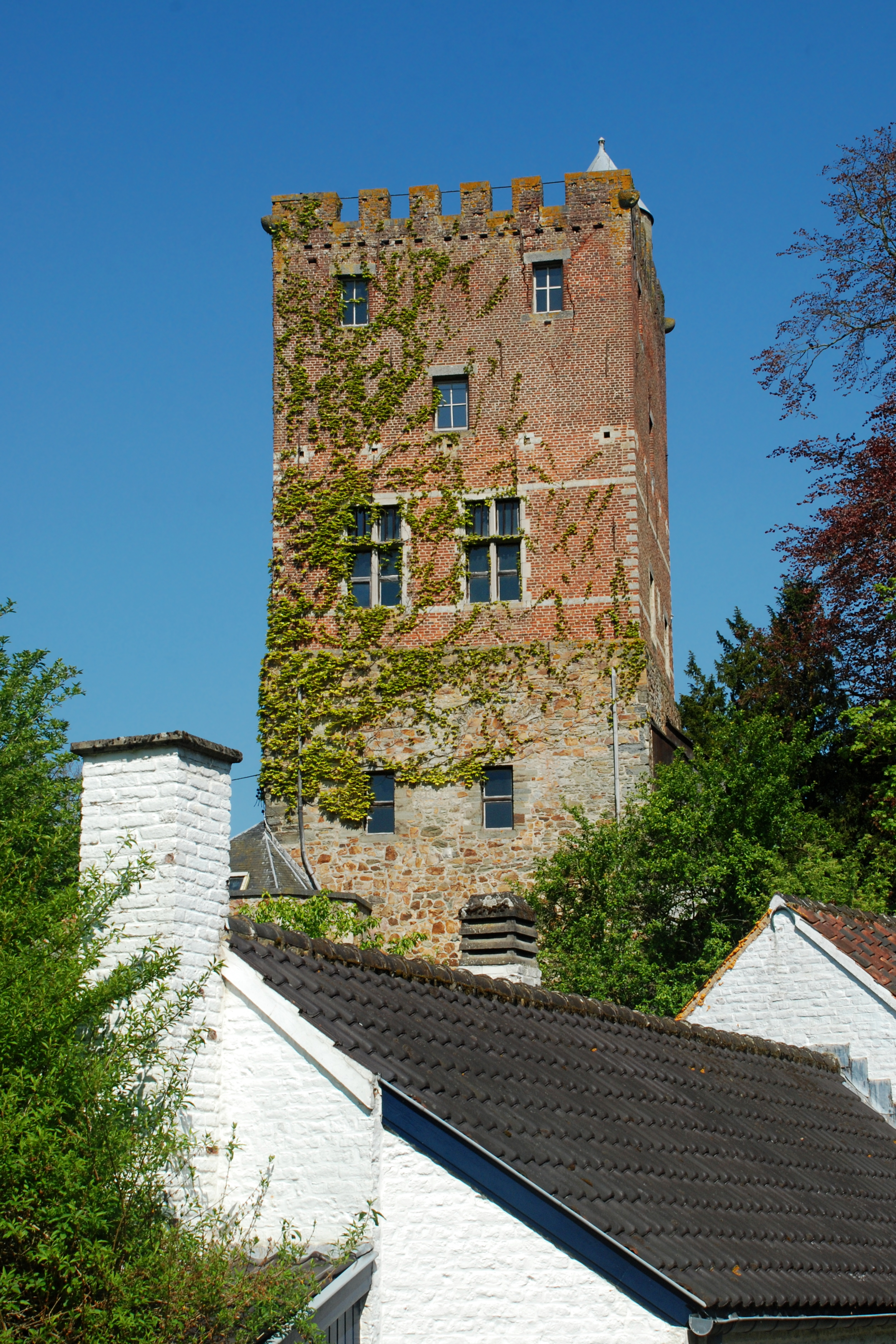
Dungeon of Bierbais

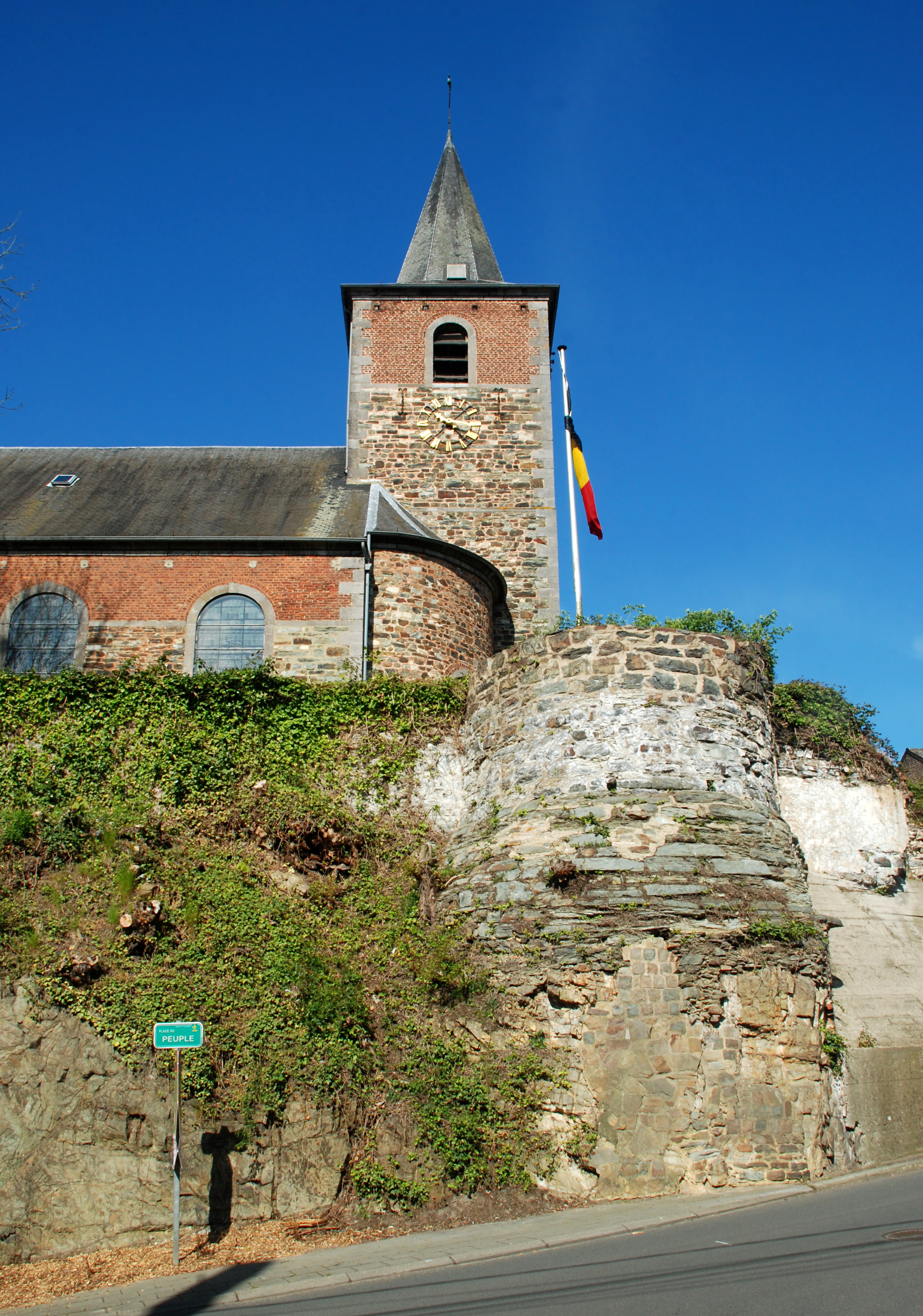
Saint-Guibert Church

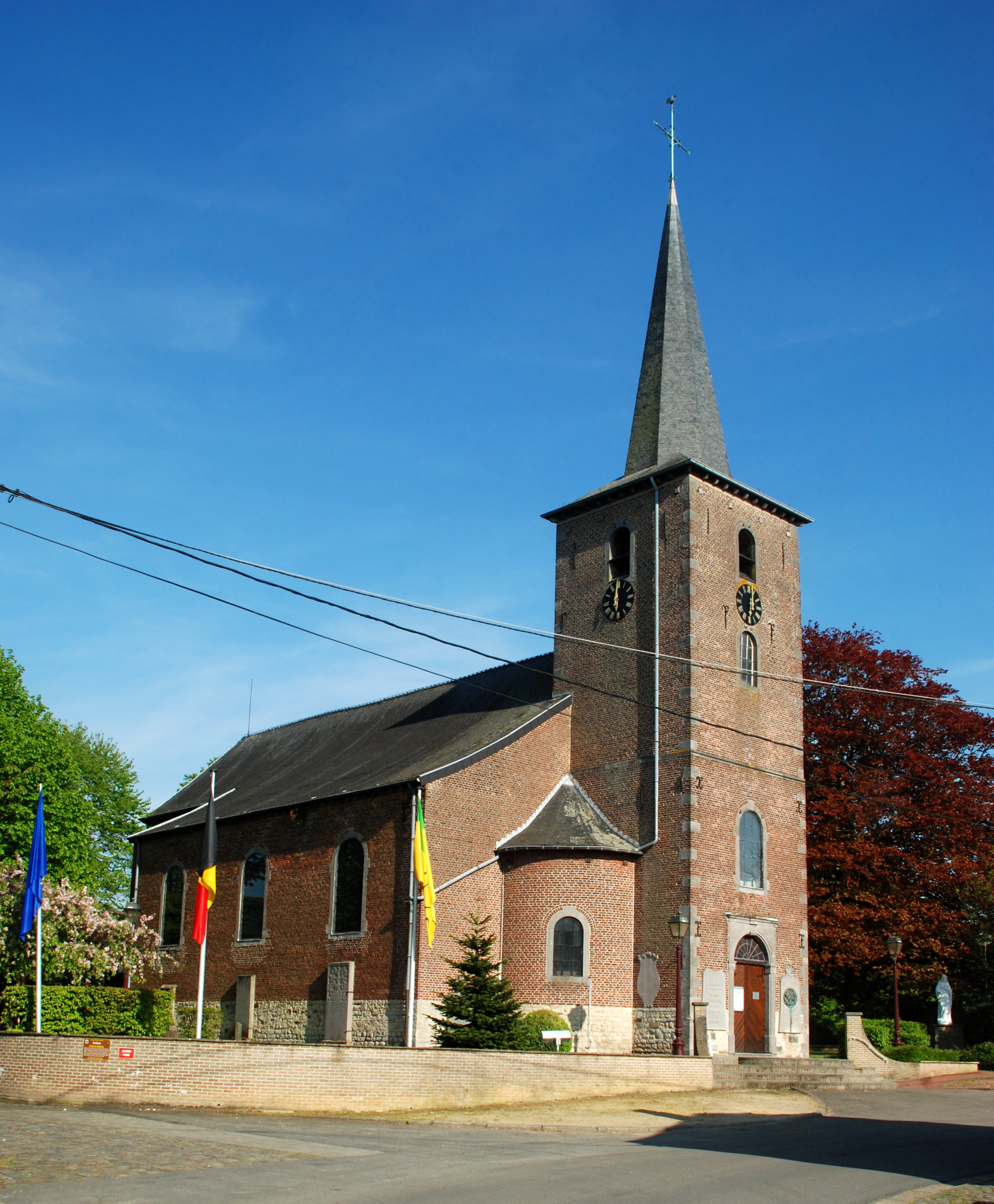
Saint-Pierre Church in Corbais
