= Maria Theresia Bonzel =

German religious sister

Blessed Maria Theresia Bonzel SSFPA
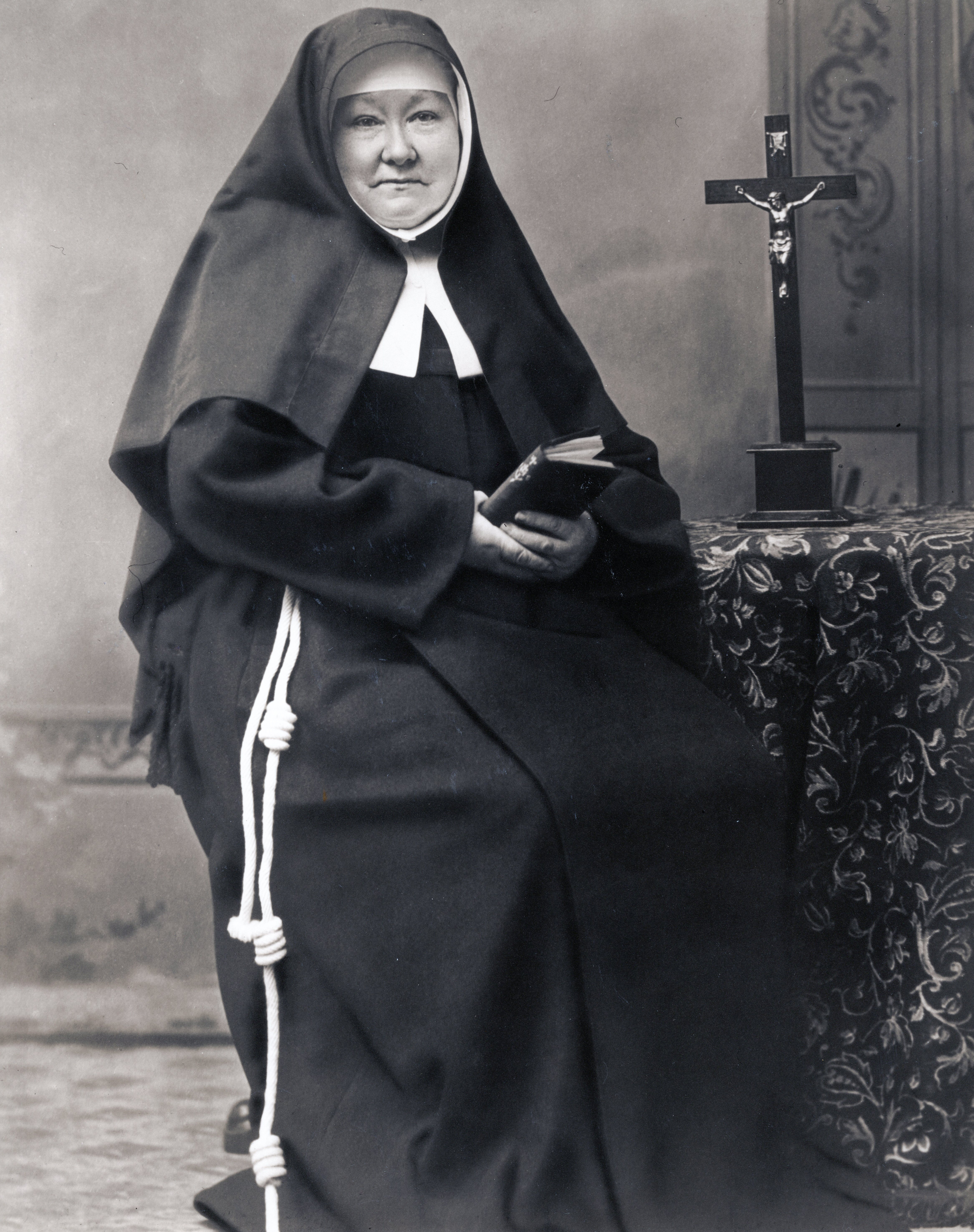

Virgin
- Born: 17 September 1830; Olpe, Arnsberg, Germany
- Died: 6 February 1905 (aged 74); Olpe, Arnsberg, Germany
- Venerated in: Roman Catholic Church
- Beatified: 10 November 2013, Paderborn Cathedral, Germany by Cardinal Angelo Amato
- Feast: 9 February

Maria Theresia Bonzel (17 September 1830 – 6 February 1905), born Regina Christine Wilhelmine Bonzel, was a German religious sister. She was the founder of the Sisters of Saint Francis of Perpetual Adoration. By the time of her death, the congregation had sisters all over the world, and had established schools, hospitals, and orphanages.

Bonzel was beatified in 2013 by Cardinal Angelo Amato on behalf of Pope Francis.

== Biography ==
Regina Christine Wilhelmine Bonzel was born on 17 September 1830, the elder of two daughters of Friedrich Edmund and Angela Maria Liese Bonzel. She was familiarly called "Aline". Her mother sent her to study at the Ursulines in Cologne and it was there that her vocation matured. Her parents were opposed to her desire to enter religious life but she nonetheless entered the Third Order of Saint Francis in 1850. Alongside eight other women she joined and took the name of "Maria Theresia".

In 1859, Maria and two other women founded a monastic community to care for orphans and neglected children. Their work expanded to include the welfare of the poor and health care. On 20 July 1863 Konrad Martin, the Bishop of Paderborn, granted formal approval to the Sisters of Saint Francis of Perpetual Adoration. During the war years of 1870-71, eight hundred wounded soldiers were cared for by the Sisters from Olpe.

During the Kulturkampf, an anticlerical reaction against the growing strength of the Catholic Church, the Sisters were forbidden to receive new candidates. The orphanage was closed by order of the government and the children taken away. Bonzel decided to begin a new foundation in North America.

The first missionaries arrived in Lafayette, Indiana, in December 1875 and began their work of caring for the sick. The congregation grew and the Sisters were able to open many new hospitals and schools. Bonzel wrote to the American sisters often. She made three separate voyages across the ocean to visit her Sisters in the United States. On one occasion, while traveling to Columbus, Nebraska, the train was held up by robbers.

By 1882 legal restrictions in Germany had eased, and new members were again admitted. Bonzel died on 6 February 1905 at Olpe. The congregation at the time of her death had 73 branches in Germany and 49 in North America.

== Beatification ==
The cause of beatification commenced under Pope John XXIII on 18 September 1961 which bestowed on her the title of Servant of God. The Positio – which documented her life of heroic virtue – was submitted to the Congregation for the Causes of Saints which led to Pope Benedict XVI's declaration of Bonzel to be Venerable on 27 March 2010.

An investigation into a presumed miracle took place in 2001 and Pope Francis approved the miracle on 27 March 2013. Cardinal Angelo Amato – on behalf of Pope Francis – presided over the beatification on 10 November 2013. The miracle involved the cure of a 4-year-old boy in Colorado Springs, Colorado.
