= Sisters of Christian Charity =

Religious institute

The Sisters of Christian Charity (S.C.C.), officially called Sisters of Christian Charity, Daughters of the Blessed Virgin Mary of the Immaculate Conception, is a Catholic women's congregation of pontifical right founded in Paderborn, Germany, on 21 August 1849 by Pauline Mallinckrodt. Their original mission was caring for impoverished and abandoned children, with a special emphasis on the blind. Today, they work in a variety of ministries.

== History ==
The institute had attained great success throughout Germany when, in 1873, its members were forced into exile by the persecution of the Kulturkampf. Some went to South America, others emigrated to New Orleans, United States, where, in April 1873, they founded a house and took charge of a parochial school. Pauline Mallinckrodt followed shortly after and established a new provincial mother-house, at Wilkes-Barre, Pennsylvania.

In 1887 the motherhouse, which had removed to Belgium, returned to Paderborn. The congregation was confirmed on 7 February 1888 by Pope Leo XIII. The Sisters opened houses in the Archdioceses of Baltimore, Chicago, Cincinnati, Detroit, Newark, New York, Philadelphia, St. Louis, and Saint Paul, and in the Dioceses of Albany, Belleville, Brooklyn, Harrisburg, Paterson, Sioux City, and Syracuse.

In 1927, the sisters purchased the Seymour L. Cromwell estate in Mendham, New Jersey, for a retreat and guest house. The 112-acre estate featured a 47-room Georgian-style mansion. That same year, the North American Province was divided into a North American Eastern Province and a North American Western Province. The motherhouse for the Eastern province is located in Mendham, New Jersey, and the motherhouse of the Western province was located in Wilmette, Illinois. The Eastern province had as its primary work that of Catholic education. During the 1950s and 1960s the Sisters added to their field of labor the care of the sick by establishing two hospitals in Pennsylvania. They have since joined to form the North American Province, based in New Jersey. The generalate is in Rome.

In 1975 a group of members separated and founded the Sisters of the Living Word. The congregation's foundress, Pauline Mallinckrodt, was beatified by Pope John Paul II in Rome on 14 April 1985.

== Apostolate ==
By 2010, Sisters of Christian Charity were present in Germany, Italy, the United States, Chile, Argentina, Uruguay, Bolivia, and the Philippines. the Sisters work in a variety of ministries including education, healthcare, pastoral work, retreat and spiritual centers, and social work.

The Sisters of Christian Charity sponsor Assumption College for Sisters, a two-year Roman Catholic women's college on the campus of Morris Catholic High School. Founded in 1953 through an affiliation with Seton Hall University, Assumption specializes in theological studies and the liberal arts. It is the last remaining sisters' college, or college primarily designed to educate nuns, in the United States.
