= Indiana HB 1608 =

State law barring teaching of human sexuality to young children

Indiana State Legislature
- Full name: Education Matters Bill
- Introduced: January 19, 2023
- Sponsor(s): Stacey Donato, Jeff Raatz, Gary Byrne
- Governor: Eric Holcomb
- Bill: HB 1608
- Website: http://iga.in.gov/legislative/2023/bills/house/1608

Status: Current legislation

Indiana HB 1608 (also called the "Education Matters Bill") is a bill that prohibits any person, entity, or vendor working in an official school capacity from providing instruction on human sexuality for grades K through 3. The bill was passed 65–29 by the Indiana House on February 23, 2023. It was referred to the Indiana Senate on the following day and passed on April 10, 2023. It was signed into law by Governor Eric Holcomb on May 4, 2023, and became Public Law 248. It goes into effect on July 1, 2023. After it was signed, the American Civil Liberties Union and Indiana-based LGBT groups decried the bill as part of the "Slate of Hate" along with such bills as SB 480, HB 1041, and HB 1447, all of which have since become laws.

== Bill contents ==
HB 1608 stipulates that no school, school employee, or third-party vendor may teach content dealing with human sexuality to students in pre-kindergarten through 3rd grade. It does not prohibit teachers and other school employees from responding to students' direct questions on the subject. The bill also requires schools to notify parents or guardians in writing when their child requests changes to their name, title, pronoun, or other identifying terms if the student is not an emancipated minor.

== Legislative history ==
HB 1608 is based in part on Florida's Parental Rights in Education Act (HB 1557), sometimes referred to as the "Don't Say Gay" law. The Indiana bill was authored by Republican Representative Michelle Davis and co-authored by Representatives Jake Teshka, Chris Jeter, and Robert Heaton. It was sponsored in the other chamber by Senators Stacey Donato, Gary Byrne, and Jeff Raatz. HB 1608 was referred to the Indiana Senate on February 24, 2023. There, twelve major amendments were voted on, one of which (Amendment 12) passed.

HB 1608 was signed on April 28, 2023, by Lieutenant Governor and Senate President Suzanne Crouch and President pro tempore Rodric Bray. It was signed on May 1, 2023, by Todd Huston, Speaker of the Indiana House and by Governor Eric Holcomb 3 days later.

== Controversy ==
The American Civil Liberties Union of Indiana officially opposed the bill and continues to oppose it as a law. "This bill would also force teachers to out students who request to be referred to by a different name or pronoun, by sending a note home to parents. These types of forced outing bills expose youth to the threat of additional violence at school and at home." Among other organizations that oppose the law is Indiana Youth Group. The law also has outspoken proponents in the State Senate, House, and Governor's Office, all of whom cite parental rights as the law's chief rationale. Representative Davis released a statement saying, "Parents should not be cut out of the decision-making, and schools should not shield a parent from knowledge about their child."
