= LGBTQ rights in Indiana =

- Indiana (US)
- Legal status: Legal since 1977
- Gender identity: Legal from 2014 until 2025, Restricted in 2025 and banned since 2026
- Discrimination protections: Sexual orientation protection in employment (per court ruling). Sexual orientation and gender identity protections in state employment

Family rights
- Recognition of relationships: Same-sex marriage since 2014
- Adoption: Same-sex couples allowed to adopt

Lesbian, gay, bisexual, transgender, and queer (LGBTQ) rights in the U.S. state of Indiana have been shaped by both state and federal law. These evolved from harsh penalties established early in the state's history to the decriminalization of same-sex activity in 1977 and the legalization of same-sex marriage in 2014. Indiana was subject to an April 2017 federal court ruling that discrimination based on sexual orientation is tantamount to discrimination on account of "sex", as defined by the Civil Rights Act of 1964. The ruling establishes sexual orientation as a protected characteristic in the workplace, forbidding unfair discrimination, although Indiana state statutes do not include sexual orientation or gender identity among its categories of discrimination.

Historically, Indiana had severe penalties in place for same-sex activity, including the death penalty for sodomy, until decriminalization in 1976. Same-sex marriages have been recognized and performed in Indiana since 2014, when the U.S. Supreme Court refused to consider an appeal in the case of Baskin v. Bogan. There had been regular attempts to adopt a constitutional amendment defining marriage as a union between a man and a woman since 2004, but they have failed. Indiana previously tracked bias crimes, including those based on sexual orientation, but did not enhance sentencing for such crimes until April 2019 when the state passed a hate crimes law allowing judges to impose harsher sentences for crimes committed with intent to harm or intimidate based on perceived or actual characteristics.

In 2004, Governor Joe Kernan issued an executive order protecting state employees from discrimination based on sexual orientation and gender identity, which was further reinforced in 2005 by Governor Mitch Daniels, though state statutes do not include these categories among its non-discrimination grounds. Indiana's 2015 Religious Freedom Restoration Act faced significant backlash from groups which argued it targeted LGBT rights and was later clarified to prevent discrimination based on sexual orientation and gender identity.

In May 2023, Indiana passed HB 1608, prohibiting classroom instruction on "human sexuality" from kindergarten to third grade and requiring schools to inform parents if a minor student requests a change in name or pronouns. A federal judge upheld an injunction in August 2023, preventing Indiana schools from restricting bathroom access for transgender students. In March 2023, Indiana passed a bill banning gender-affirming healthcare for minors, which took effect in February 2024, and in April 2023 the state banned gender-affirming healthcare within prisons. Indiana statutes allow single LGBT persons and same-sex couples to adopt. A federal ruling in 2016 required the state to list both same-sex parents on birth certificates. In May 2023, the Governor signed a law prohibiting local governments from enacting bans on conversion therapy, effectively keeping the practice legal statewide. In March 2025, Governor Mike Braun signed an executive order defining sex solely as assigned sex at birth, resulting in the Indiana Department of Health to ban gender marker changes on birth certificates.

A 2022 Public Religion Research Institute poll found that 67% of Indiana residents supported same-sex marriage, 78% supported anti-discrimination laws covering sexual orientation and gender identity, and 57% opposed allowing public businesses to refuse service to LGBTQ people based on religious beliefs.

== Legality of same-sex sexual activity ==
In 1795, Indiana as part of the Northwest Territory passed the "buggery" law, which punished male sodomy with death. In 1807, the Indiana Territory enacted a criminal code which included a sodomy provision, eliminating the gender-specifics (meaning it would be applicable to both heterosexual and homosexual conduct), reducing the penalty to one to five years' imprisonment, a fine of 100 to 500 dollars, up to 500 lashes and a permanent loss of civil rights. Sodomy was briefly legal between the years 1852 and 1881, as a new criminal code was passed without any mention to sodomy. In 1881, the state passed a statute outlawing anal intercourse, fellatio (oral sex) as well as masturbation under the age of 21 (which was labelled "self-pollution") for both heterosexuals and homosexuals. Penalty was set at "not more than fourteen years nor less than two years". In the 1923 case of Young v. State, the Indiana Supreme Court unanimously ruled that cunnilingus was also criminal, and in 1939, in Connell v. State, rejected contentions had the statute applied only to homosexual sexual activity.

In 1949, the state passed a psychopathic offender law, under which any person above 16 years of age suffering from a "mental disorder" "coupled with criminal propensities to the commission of sex offenses" would be labelled a "criminal sexual psychopathic person". Those convicted of sodomy would not be able to leave correctional institutions until their "full recovery of criminal psychopathy". A law review article in 1947 showed 160 commitments under the law, of which 60 (38%) were for sodomy and none of the offenders had been a woman. A majority of these commitments were for heterosexual conduct. In 1959, an amendment to the law meant that those refusing to cooperate with examining psychiatrists could be held in contempt of court. In 20 years of operation, only 10 "consensual adult homosexuals" were committed under the law. The law was upheld by the Indiana Supreme Court in 1968 in State ex rel. Haskett v. Marion County Criminal Court, Division One et al. In 1971, the Indiana General Assembly amended the law, removing sodomy from the list of triggering offenses, if consensual and committed with an adult person.

In 1967, in a divided 3-2 ruling, the Indiana Supreme Court upheld as constitutionally sufficient an indictment charging the "abominable and detestable crime against nature". Justice Amos W. Jackson dissented, writing that the

very language of the statute purporting to define the offense of sodomy, is so indefinite and uncertain that its unconstitutionality follows as certainly as night follows day.

Jackson further wrote that he

hoped that the incoming legislature will either clarify or abolish this anarchism reminiscent of the heyday of the witch hunts of early colonial times. In today's space age and sophisticated society, it seems that the statute should spell out in language understandable by the person of average scholastic attainment and intelligence the specific nature of the crime with which he is charged and if that cannot be done then it should not be denominated a crime.

In 1968, in Cotner v. Henry, the Seventh Circuit Court of Appeals ruled 2–1 that married couples could not be prosecuted under the sodomy statute. In Dickson v. State (1971), the Indiana Supreme Court upheld the constitutionality of the sodomy law, in a divided 3–2 vote. Dissenting, Justice Roger DeBruler wrote that the

moral preferences of the majority may not be imposed on everyone else unless there exists some harm to other persons. Sexual acts between consenting adults in private do not harm anyone else and should be free from state regulation.

Indiana decriminalized same-sex sexual activity in 1976, effective on July 1, 1977. The age of consent is 16. An attempt to reinstate consensual sodomy as a felony was rejected by a House committee in 1977, by a 6–4 vote.

== Recognition of same-sex relationships ==
Same-sex marriages are recognized and performed in Indiana under a federal court decision in October 2014.

Annual attempts to adopt a constitutional amendment defining marriage as the union of a man and a woman have failed since 2004. Indiana requires that two separately elected legislatures approve an amendment for it to be put to a popular vote. The proposed amendment passed both chambers in 2005, and then again in 2011. On June 25, 2014, U. S. District Court Judge Young declared Indiana's same-sex marriage ban to be unconstitutional, and same-sex couples immediately began to secure marriage licenses. However, the ruling was appealed. On October 6, 2014, the U.S. Supreme Court refused to hear the appeal, effectively legalizing same-sex marriage in Indiana.

=== Domestic partnerships ===
Map of Indiana counties and cities that offer domestic partner benefits either county-wide or in particular cities. City offers domestic partner benefits County-wide partner benefits through domestic partnership County or city does not offer domestic partner benefits

There is no recognition of domestic partnerships at the state level in Indiana. Three cities have passed such opportunities.

- Bloomington

In 1997, Bloomington established domestic partnerships for unmarried city employees.

- Carmel

Carmel has established domestic partnerships for unmarried city employees.

- Indianapolis

On August 13, 2012, the Indianapolis City-County Council, in a 20-8 bipartisan vote, established domestic partnerships for all married and unmarried employees in the city and county. On August 23, 2012, Mayor Greg Ballard signed the ordinance into law which went into effect on January 1, 2013.

== Discrimination protections ==
Map of Indiana counties and cities that have sexual orientation and/or gender identity anti–employment discrimination ordinances Sexual orientation and gender identity with anti–employment discrimination ordinance Sexual orientation with anti–employment discrimination ordinance Sexual orientation and gender identity solely in state employment

Governor Joe Kernan issued an executive order in 2004 protecting state employees from discrimination based on sexual orientation as well as gender identity and expression. In 2005, Governor Mitch Daniels added the terms "sexual orientation" and "gender identity" to the list of protected categories in state employment covered by the state's Equal Employment Opportunity policy.

In 2013, Kim Hively filed a lawsuit against the Ivy Tech Community College of Indiana in South Bend, arguing that she was denied promotions and let go from her job because of her sexual orientation. The United States Court of Appeals for the Seventh Circuit heard oral arguments in the case, known as Hively v. Ivy Tech Community College, in November 2016 with discussion focusing on the meaning of the word "sex" in Title VII of the Civil Rights Act, which bans workplace discrimination based on race, religion, national origin or sex. On April 4, 2017, the Court of Appeals ruled in an 8–3 vote that the Civil Rights Act of 1964 prohibits employment discrimination on the basis of sexual orientation via the category of "sex". Ivy Tech subsequently stated they would not appeal the ruling to the Supreme Court. Human Rights Campaign hailed the ruling, saying: "Today's ruling is a monumental victory for fairness in the workplace, and for the dignity of lesbian, gay and bisexual Americans who may live in fear of losing their job based on whom they love." The court decision establishes that workplace discrimination on account of sexual orientation (such as in hiring or promotions, etc.) violates federal civil rights law, and is therefore prohibited. The ruling is only binding to the states of Illinois, Indiana and Wisconsin.

The counties of Marion, Monroe, Tippecanoe, and Vanderburgh, along with the cities and towns of Anderson, Bloomington, Carmel, Columbus, Crawfordsville, Evansville, Hammond, Indianapolis, Kokomo, Lafayette, Michigan City, Muncie, Munster, New Albany, South Bend, Terre Haute, Valparaiso, West Lafayette, and Zionsville, have ordinances prohibiting employment discrimination on the basis of sexual orientation and gender identity.

Lake County, Fort Wayne, and Whitestown have ordinances prohibiting employment discrimination on the basis of sexual orientation only.

=== Religious objections ===
On March 26, 2015, Governor Mike Pence signed the Religious Freedom Restoration Act (RFRA), also known as the Indiana "religious objections" bill, into law. The law's signing was met with widespread criticism by such organizations as the NCAA, Apple CEO Tim Cook, the gamer convention Gen Con, and the Disciples of Christ. Technology company Salesforce.com said it would halt its plans to expand in the state. Thousands protested against the policy.

On April 2, 2015, Governor Pence signed a measure into law which was intended to be a clarification of the newly enacted legislation. According to The Indianapolis Star:

Specifically, the new language says the RFRA does not authorize a provider—including businesses or individuals—to refuse to offer or provide services, facilities, goods, employment, housing or public accommodation to any member of the public based on sexual orientation or gender identity, in addition to race, color, religion, ancestry, age, national origin, disability, sex or military service.

— Indy Star (April 2, 2015)

=== Gay-Straight Alliances ===
In December 2021, a federal judge allowed gay-straight alliances to be permitted within public schools. A group of students sued the school in Pendleton for banning gay-straight alliances.

== Adoption and parenting ==
Indiana statutes permit single LGBT persons to adopt. The state Court of Appeals ruled in 2006 that unmarried couples, including same-sex couples, may adopt as well. Local courts also support the right of a same-sex partner to adopt his or her same-sex partner's biological or adopted child.

In 2005, the Indiana Court of Appeals unanimously ruled that lesbian partners who agree to conceive a child through artificial insemination are both the legal parents of any children born to them. Indiana law allows any woman to undergo artificial insemination. The spouse of a pregnant women is generally presumed to be the parent of her child.

On June 30, 2016, a federal judge ruled in Henderson v. Box that Indiana must allow same-sex couples to list both their names on their children's birth certificates. The ruling came as a result of a federal lawsuit filed by eight same-sex couples who were unable to list the non-gestational parent's name on the child's birth certificate. When an opposite-sex couple had a child, the state granted a "presumption of parenthood" to the father and listed him on the birth certificate. However, when a same-sex couple had a child, the state denied that presumption and forced the second partner to undergo an adoption, a "long, arduous and expensive" process. In January 2017, Attorney General Curtis Hill appealed the ruling to the U.S. Court of Appeals for the Seventh Circuit, which unanimously upheld it on January 17, 2020. In December 2020, the SCOTUS declined the case, automatically upholding the previous 7th Circuit rulings.

Surrogacy contracts are "void and unenforceable" in Indiana. While surrogacy is not specifically illegal in the state and can be practiced, courts will generally refuse to recognize such contracts, so intended parents, including same-sex couples, must complete an adoption application.

== Gender identity and expression ==
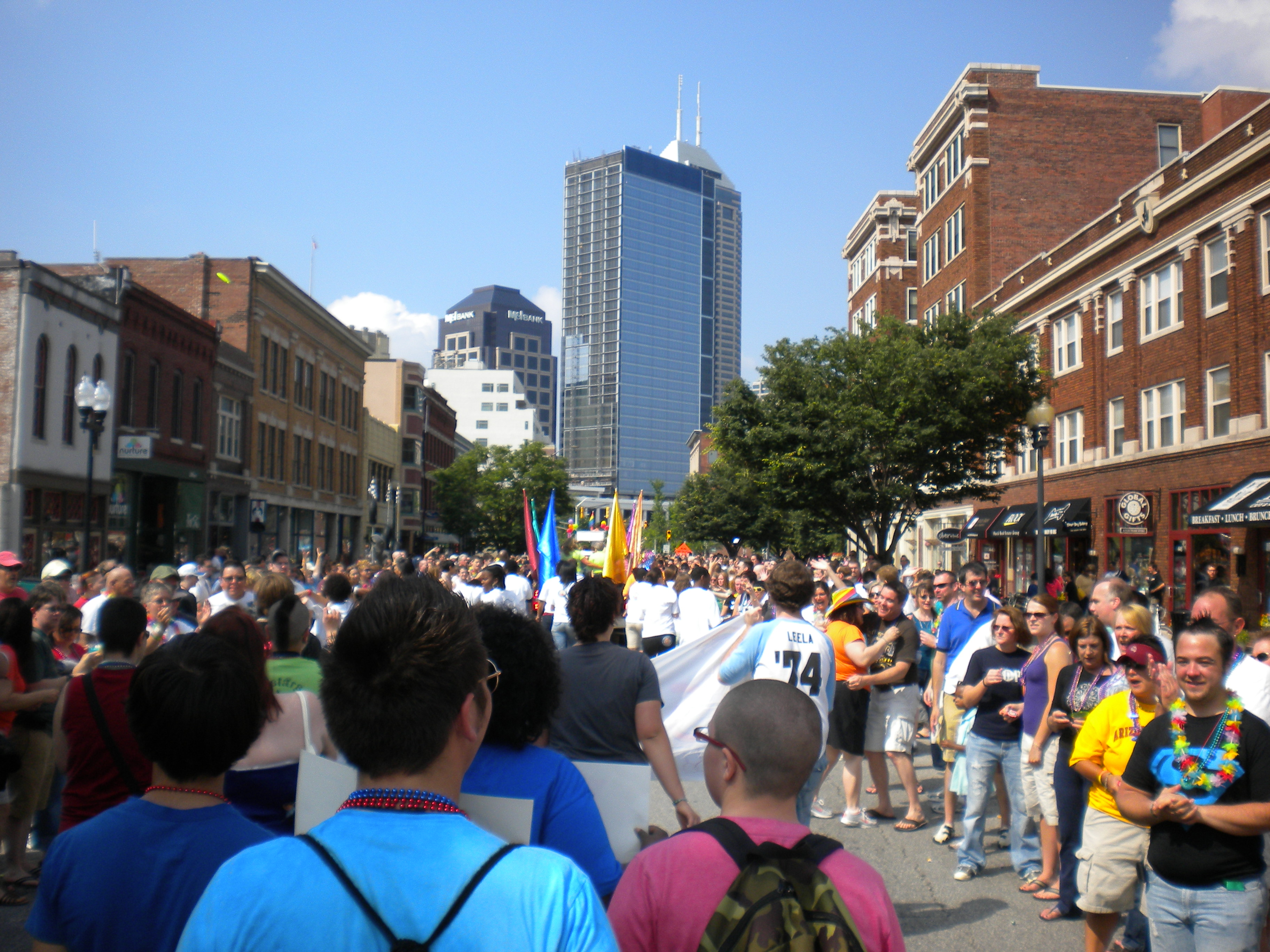
The 2009 edition of Indy Pride, Indiana's largest LGBT event, held annually in Indianapolis.

=== Pronouns usage in schools ===
In May 2023, just days after the bill passed through both houses of the Indiana General Assembly, the Governor of Indiana signed into law Indiana HB 1608, which prohibits classroom instruction pertaining to "human sexuality" from kindergarten to third grade. Additionally, if a non-emancipated minor student asks an educator to refer to them by a different name, gender pronoun, or title, the law compels the school to report the event in writing to at least one parent of the student.

=== Bathroom Access ===
As of April 2026, there are currently no legal restrictions on transgender people using restrooms aligned with their gender identity in Indiana state law. Some cities such as Indianapolis and Bloomington have gender identity protections enshrined in city ordinances protecting trans peoples' bathroom usage within their city limits.

State Representative Bruce Borders repeatedly introduced legislation that would implement a criminal bathroom ban for anyone who uses a restroom which does not align with sex assigned at birth, with a proposal introduced as early as 2021 and as recent as 2026. These bills would never receive hearings and would die in committee.

In August 2023, a federal judge for the United States Court of Appeals for the Seventh Circuit upheld a lower court's preliminary injunction, preventing Indiana schools from limiting the bathroom usage of transgender students (pending litigation).

In 2026, state senator Liz Brown introduced Senate Bill 182, which would define gender as sex assigned at birth, ban birth certificate gender marker changes permanently, and ban trans people from prisons that do not align with their sex assigned at birth. It would be amended to include a ban on bathroom use for trans students in schools and universities, as well as extend those restrictions sleeping facilities that do not algin with sex assigned at birth for school and universities. The bill passed the Indiana Senate but failed to get a hearing in the Indiana House.

=== Identity documents ===
Transgender persons were able change their legal gender on their Indiana birth certificate from 2014 until 2025 with a court order. In March 2025, Governor Mike Braun signed an executive order regulating the definition of sex to assigned sex at birth, and directing the Indiana Department of Health to no longer update gender markers. The ACLU sued the Indiana Department of Health attempting to overturn the executive order. In February 2026, the Indiana Bureau of Motor Vehicles implemented a new prohibition on the changes of gender-markers to reflect the executive order by Governor Braun, despite public pushback to the policy change.

An "X" gender marker is no longer offered. From March 2019 to January 2020, the Indiana Bureau of Motor Vehicles did offer a "gender X" option on driver's licenses. To request it, applicants needed to present a certified, amended birth certificate that attests to the gender change or a signed, dated physician's statement confirming a permanent gender change. On November 15, 2019, in a public hearing by the Bureau of Motor Vehicles, the policy was overwhelmingly rejected. In March 2020, Indiana Attorney General Curtis Hill published an opinion that the Bureau had overstepped their bounds, and that "only the General Assembly may determine whether the state of Indiana will codify any non-binary designations on state documents".

A 2017 effort to prevent gender marker changes on birth certificates was unsuccessful. On January 12, 2017, Representative Bruce Borders introduced a bill in the Indiana House of Representatives that would have prevented transgender people from doing this. The organization Freedom Indiana objected to the denial of "the very existence of transgender people, the identity they live as and the person they have always known themselves to be." The next day, Representative Cindy Kirchhofer, chair of the House Public Health Committee, denied the bill a hearing, effectively killing it. This bill, however, would be repeatedly introduced in subsequent years with a similar fate.

=== Gender-affirming care for minors ===
In March 2023, the Indiana state legislature passed Senate Bill 480, banning access to gender affirming healthcare to minors. Under this bill, physicians and other professionals could not provide gender transition procedures to persons under 18 years of age, or knowingly "aiding and abetting" a physician in such care. The bill proposed that minors not receiving gender-affirming medical care by July 1, 2023, would not be able to begin receiving it. Minors already receiving gender-affirming care by July 1, 2023, would lose access to such care after six months. The bill was signed into law by Governor of Indiana Eric Holcomb, effective immediately under an "emergency clause," in early April 2023.

On the same day the bill was signed, the ACLU of Indiana and ACLU National (American Civil Liberties Union) sued on behalf of four transgender youth and their families, as well as a doctor and health care clinic. The lawsuit alleges Senate Bill 480 violates the Equal Protection Clause of the Fourteenth Amendment of the US Constitution.

On June 16, 2023, a federal judge temporarily blocked the law, so it did not take effect on July 1, pending the outcome of the lawsuit. However, on February 27, 2024, the healthcare ban took effect when the Seventh Circuit Court of Appeals stayed the lower court's injunction.

In November 2024, the federal based United States courts of appeals upheld and allowed the legislation to go into full effect - that explicitly protecting children and minors from "transgender-affirming based experimental healthcare" within Indiana, from sexual reassignment surgery to puberty blockers and hormone therapy that is banned.

=== Sports ===
Indiana's Religious Freedom Restoration Act was proposed just before Indianapolis was set to host the 2015 Men's Basketball Final Four tournament. The bill clashed with the NCAA core values of inclusion and equality. Under pressure from across the nation and fearing the economic loss of being banned from hosting NCAA events, the governor of Indiana, Mike Pence, revised the bill so that businesses could not discriminate based on sexual orientation, race, religion, or disability. The NCAA accepted the revised bill and continues to host events in Indiana. The bill was enacted into law on July 1, 2015.

In March 2022, Indiana HB 1041 passed the Indiana General Assembly banning transgender girls in K-12 schools from playing on women's teams. The Governor of Indiana Eric Holcomb vetoed the bill in the same month. 10 US states have implemented similar legislation.

On May 24, 2022, the General Assembly overrode Governor Holcomb's veto, passing the bill into law. The law is expected to be challenged in court.

=== Gender-affirming healthcare within prisons ban ===
In April 2023, the Governor of Indiana, Eric Holcomb, signed into law Indiana House Bill 1569. It banned any gender-affirming healthcare within prisons, specifically using state resources or federal funds for "sexual reassignment surgery to an offender patient." The bill will take effect July 1, 2023. It will not impact offender patients approved for sexual reassignment surgery prior to July 1, 2023.

== Hate crime law ==
Previously, Indiana collected data on "bias crimes", which had included sexual orientation bias since 2003, but did not criminalize them as hate crimes nor alter proposed sentencing requirements due to sexual orientation bias. Such hate crimes, however, are covered federally under the Matthew Shepard and James Byrd Jr. Hate Crimes Prevention Act.

In April 2019, the Indiana General Assembly passed a bill with various controversial and contentious amendments on hate crimes. Unlike other hate crime laws in the United States, Indiana's law does not list specific categories, instead "[making] it an aggravating circumstance that a crime was committed with the intent to harm or intimidate an individual or a group of individuals because of certain perceived or actual characteristics". Governor Eric Holcomb signed the bill into law on April 3. The lack of a specific list of categories drew criticism and claims that it violates the vagueness doctrine. As a result of the law, judges may consider a stricter sentence for someone who committed a crime based on the victim's sexual orientation or gender identity.

== Conversion therapy local level ban ==
In May 2023, the Governor of Indiana signed a bill into law that passed both houses of the Indiana General Assembly to explicitly ban all local level governments - at both a city and county level across all of Indiana from implementing conversion therapy bans by ordinance and/or executive order. The impact of this law was to essentially keep conversion therapy legal indirectly.

== Public opinion ==
A 2022 Public Religion Research Institute (PRRI) opinion poll found that 67% of Indiana residents supported same-sex marriage, while 31% opposed it and 1% were unsure. The same poll found that 78% of Indiana residents supported an anti-discrimination law covering sexual orientation and gender identity while 20% were opposed. 2% were undecided. Additionally, 57% were against allowing public businesses to refuse to serve LGBTQ people due to religious beliefs, while 40% supported allowing such religious-based refusals. 2% were undecided.

Public opinion for LGBTQ anti-discrimination laws in Indiana
Poll source	Date(s) administered	Sample size	Margin of error	% support	% opposition	% no opinion
Public Religion Research Institute	January 3-December 30, 2018	1,237	not stated	65%	29%	6%
Public Religion Research Institute	April 5-December 23, 2017	1,531	not stated	66%	25%	9%
Public Religion Research Institute	April 29, 2015-January 7, 2016	1,938	not stated	70%	24%	6%

== Summary table ==
Same-sex sexual activity legal	Yes (Since 1977)
Equal age of consent (16)	Yes
Anti-discrimination laws in employment	Yes (Since 2020)
Anti-discrimination laws in the provision of goods and services	No / Yes (Varies by city and county)
Anti-discrimination laws in all other areas (incl. indirect discrimination, hate speech)	No / Yes (Varies by city and county)
Hate crime law includes sexual orientation	No / Yes (Tacitly included, though no explicit categories listed)
Same-sex marriages	Yes (Since 2014)
Stepchild adoption by same-sex couples	Yes (Since 2006)
Joint adoption by same-sex couples	Yes (Since 2006)
Gays, lesbians and bisexuals allowed to serve openly in the military	Yes (Since 2011)
Transgender people allowed to serve openly in the military	No (Banned since 2025)
Transvestites allowed to serve openly in the military	No
Intersex people allowed to serve openly in the military	/ Yes (Current DoD policy bans "Hermaphrodites" from serving or enlisting in the military)
Right to change legal gender	No (Birth Certificates Changes Banned in 2025, Driver's Licenses Changes Banned in 2026)
Third gender option	No (Initially allowed in 2019, policy suspended in January 2020)
Conversion therapy banned for minors	No (Since 2023, local level bans across Indiana by ordinance and executive order are banned and voided from enactment - essentially keeping conversion therapy legal by both the Governor and the state Legislature)
Birth certificate recognition of children by same-sex couples (from IVF parentage)	Yes (Since 2020)
Access to IVF for lesbians	Yes (Since 2005)
Commercial surrogacy for gay male couples	No / Yes (Surrogacy can be practiced, but contracts will be "void and unenforceable")
Men who have sex with men allowed to donate blood	Yes / No (Since 2020; 3-month deferral period required by FDA (Food and Drug Administration)

== See also ==
- LGBTQ rights in the United States
