= Vernon (given name) =

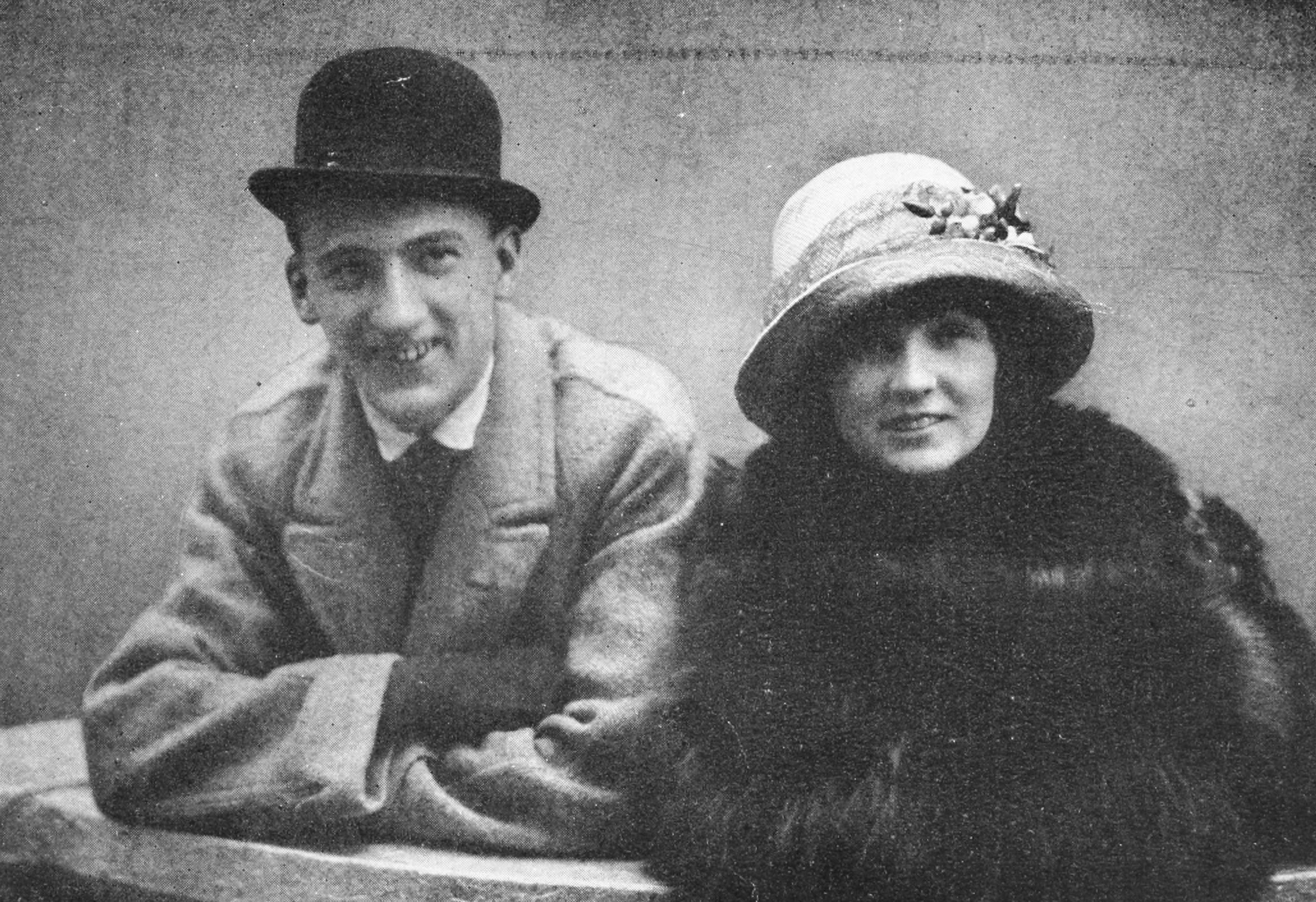
- Vernon Castle (born William Vernon Blyth; 1887-1918) and Irene Castle (born Foote; 1893-1969) in 1911.
- Gender: Masculine
- Language: English, French

Origin
- Meaning: “From the place by the alder trees”

Vernon is an English masculine given name, a transferred use of the French and English surname meaning “from the place of the alder trees.” Many English boys were likely named in honor of British Navy Admiral Edward Vernon (1684-1757). The name has been in regular use throughout the Anglosphere since 1700. The name was most popular in the United States in the early 20th century, when magician and ballroom dancer Vernon Castle was at the height of his fame. The name Vernon peaked in popularity for American boys at No. 65 on the American popularity chart in 1919, the year Irene Castle published a memoir of her husband. Vernon Castle died in a plane crash in 1918. The name has been particularly popular for Black men in the United States.

It which may refer to:

== People ==
- Vernon Abeysekera, Postmaster General of Sri Lanka from 1969–1970
- Vernon Adams (born 1993), American football quarterback
- Vernon Anthonisz, Singaporean radio presenter
- Vernon Baker (1919–2010), Medal of Honor recipient
- Vernon Bell, founder of the British karate movement
- Vernon Bogdanor (born 1943), British Research Professor
- Vernon H. Broom (1924–1989), justice of the Supreme Court of Mississippi
- Vernon Broughton (born 2001), American football player
- Vernon Bruckerhoff (1944-2012), American politician from Missouri
- Vernon Carey Jr. (born 2001), American basketball player
- Vernon Coaker (born 1953), British politician
- Vernon Carrington, Rastafarian, founder of the Twelve Tribes of Israel
- Vernon Castle (1887–1918), stage name of American ballroom dancer and dance teacher William Vernon Blyth
- Vernon Coleman (born 1946), English author
- Vernon Herbert Coleman (1898–1978) American artist and art teacher
- Vernon Cooray, Sri Lankan Sinhala electrical engineer and professor
- Vernon Corea (1927–2002), Sri Lankan radio broadcaster
- Vernon Davis (born 1984), American football player
- Vernon Dean (born 1959), American former professional football player
- Vernon Lee Evans (born 1949), American contract killer
- Vernon Forrest (1971–2009), American boxer
- Vernon Simeon Plemion Grant (1902–1990), American illustrator known for gnomes and fairy tales
- Vernon Gholston, NFL player for the New York Jets
- Vernon Hartshorn (1872–1931), Welsh trade unionist and Labour Party politician
- Vernon Henry (born 1952) American fugitive
- Vernon Huber, 36th Governor of American Samoa
- Vernon Jarrett (1918–2004), African-American journalist and commentator
- Vernon K. Jensen (1912-1982), American veterinarian and politician
- Vernon Jones, American man who has been missing since 1993
- Vernon Jonklaas, Sri Lankan Burgher lawyer and politician
- Vernon Jordan (1935–2021), American business executive and civil rights activist
- Vernon Kay (born 1974), British DJ and television presenter
- Vernon King (1923-2017), American politician from Missouri
- Vernon Lattin (born 1938), American president of Brooklyn College
- Vernon Lewis (American football) (born 1970), American football player
- Vernon Lewis (footballer) (1881–1941), English amateur footballer and minor counties cricketer
- Vernon Maxwell (born 1965) American basketball player
- Vernon Mendis (1925–2010), Sri Lankan Sinhala diplomat
- Vernon C. Miller (1896–1933), American murder victim
- Vernon R. Morris (born 1963), American atmospheric scientist
- Vernon Oickle, Canadian writer and journalist
- Vernon Pahl (born 1957), Canadian football player
- Vernon Philander (born 1985), South African cricketer
- Vernon W. Pickett (1912–1944), United States Army officer
- Vernon Presley (1916–1979), father of Elvis Presley
- Vernon Reed (1871–1963), New Zealand politician
- Vernon Reid (born 1958), American guitarist and songwriter, founder and primary songwriter of the rock band Living Colour
- Vernon Roberson (born 1952), American football player
- Vernon Scott (born 1997), American football player
- Vernon L. Smith, American economist
- Vernon L. Sommerdorf (1921–2009), American physician and politician
- Vernon K. Stevenson (1812–1884), American businessman
- Vernon Wallace Thomson (1905–1988), American lawyer and politician
- Vernon L. Walker (1894–1948), American special effects artist
- Vernon A. Walters (1917–2002), American diplomat
- Vernon Weddle (born 1935), American film, stage and television actor
- Vernon S. Welch (1906–1980), American lawyer, businessman, and politician
- Vernon Wells (baseball), American baseball player
- Vernon Wells (actor) (born 1945), Australian actor
- Hansol Vernon Chwe (born 1998), South Korean-American singer, rapper and dancer and member of the idol group Seventeen

== Fictional characters ==
- Vernon Dalhart, character played by Danny DeVito in Terms of Endearment
- Vernon Dursley, Harry Potter's uncle from the Harry Potter novels and movies
- Vernon Schillinger, leader of the Aryans on the HBO series Oz
- Vernon Tomlin, ex-cellarman and potman at the Rovers Return Inn in Coronation Street

== See also ==
- Vern, a given name, often short for Vernon
