= Indiana SB 480 =

2023 Indiana law

Indiana State Legislature
- Full name: Gender Transition Procedures for Minors
- Introduced: January 19, 2023
- Sponsor(s): Joanna King, Michelle Davis, Jake Teshka, Timothy Wesco
- Governor: Eric Holcomb
- Bill: SB 480
- Website: http://iga.in.gov/legislative/2023/bills/senate/480

Status: Current legislation

Indiana Senate Bill 480 (SB 480) introduced into the Indiana General Assembly in 2023. The bill prohibits physicians from providing "gender affirming care" (GAC) to minors. The bill passed the state Senate on February 28, 2023, and the House on March 27, 2023. Governor Eric Holcomb signed the bill on April 5, 2023.

== Contents ==
SB 480 prohibits a physician or other practitioner from providing GAC to individuals under 18 years, and from "aiding or abetting" another practitioner in providing GAC to such individuals. The bill took effect on July 1, 2023. Minors already receiving gender affirming care would have until December 31, 2023, to cease treatment.

== Legislative history ==
The bill was authored by Senators Tyler Johnson, Ed Charbonneau, and Gary Byrne and included seventeen co-authors. In the House, the bill was sponsored by Representatives Joanna King, Michelle Davis, Jake Teshka, and Timothy Wesco. The bill passed the Senate 36-12 and the House 65–30.

== Controversy ==
The bill was opposed by organizations including the American Civil Liberties Union of Indiana, Indiana Youth Group, and the Human Rights Campaign. The ACLU sued the State in April 2023, alleging that the law violates the U.S. Constitution as well as the federal requirements of the Medicaid Act and the Affordable Care Act. In June 2023, a federal court issued a preliminary injunction blocking much of the law. The injunction was lifted in February 2024, causing the immediate end of GAC for minors.
