= Same-sex marriage in Indiana =

Same-sex marriage has been legally recognized in Indiana since October 6, 2014. A lawsuit challenging the state's refusal to grant marriage licenses to same-sex couples, Baskin v. Bogan, won a favorable ruling from the U.S. District Court for the Southern District of Indiana on June 25, 2014. Until the Seventh Circuit Court of Appeals granted an emergency stay of the district court's ruling on June 27, most Indiana counties issued marriage licenses to same-sex couples. The Seventh Circuit affirmed the district court's ruling in Baskin on September 4. A ruling in Bowling v. Pence also stated that the state must recognize same-sex marriages performed out-of-state and the decision was stayed until the Seventh Circuit ruled on the merits in similar cases. The U.S. Supreme Court declined to consider an appeal in Baskin on October 6, which allowed the Seventh Circuit to implement its decision requiring Indiana to license and recognize same-sex marriages.

Previously, Indiana had restricted marriage to different-sex couples by statute since 1986. Legislation passed in 1997 further denied recognition to same-sex relationships established in other jurisdictions. However, attempts to amend the Constitution of Indiana to ban same-sex marriage and civil unions were unsuccessful. Polling suggests that a majority of Indiana residents support the legal recognition of same-sex marriage, with a 2022 poll from the Public Religion Research Institute showing that 67% of respondents supported same-sex marriage.

== Legal restrictions ==
=== Statutes ===
While unenforceable, Indiana statutes ban same-sex marriages. This ban was enacted in 1986, and a subsequent law enacted in 1997 forbade the recognition of same-sex marriages established in jurisdictions outside Indiana. On November 26, 2012, Indiana Equality Action published a study researched by law students from the LGBT Project at the Indiana University Maurer School of Law titled "More Than Just a Couple: 614 Reasons Why Marriage Equality Matters in Indiana." The study detailed the rights and responsibilities of civil marriage found in 614 laws of the Indiana Code. It showed that marriage discrimination in the state not only denied same-sex couples many legal rights, but also deprived the public protection against conflicts of interest arising from activities that were prohibited for married opposite-sex couples but not for same-sex couples.

Indiana's statutory prohibition on same-sex marriage, though unenforceable, remains on the books and has not been explicitly repealed. Unsuccessful bills to repeal the ban and replace references to "husband and wife" with the gender-neutral term "spouses" were introduced by Representative Jim Lucas in January 2017, Senator Andrea Hunley in January 2023, and Senator David Vinzant in January 2024; however, none were heard in committee. In January 2020, a bill to ban child marriage was the source of political debate in the Indiana General Assembly concerning the same-sex marriage provisions. The measure would have raised the minimum age of marriage from 15 to 18. According to the Associated Press, a House committee voted 9–1 in favor of the bill "after hearing from women who testified they were 15 or 16 when their parents forced them to marry men who had raped or molested them and then faced more abuse before being able to escape the relationship". After Representative Matt Pierce introduced an amendment to remove the unconstitutional sections banning same-sex marriage, House Speaker Brian Bosma refused to call the bill to the floor. In March 2020, a bill banning child marriage passed the House and Senate, but without the same-sex marriage amendment.

=== Constitutional amendment ===
Since 2004, there have been several efforts on behalf of a constitutional amendment banning same-sex marriage in Indiana; none of which have been successful. In 2010, such a proposal passed the Indiana Senate in a 38–10 vote, but the House of Representatives, which had a Democratic majority, took no action, failing even to schedule a hearing on the legislation. In 2011, a similar proposal passed the House 70–26 and the Senate 40–10. The text adopted was:

Only a marriage between one man and one woman shall be valid or recognized as a marriage in Indiana. A legal status identical or substantially similar to that of marriage for unmarried individuals shall not be valid or recognized.

The approval of an identical amendment by both chambers during the 2013-2014 legislative session was required to place the amendment on the state ballot in November 2014. In December 2012, Governor Mitch Daniels, without taking a position on the proposed amendment, said that business leaders had expressed concern that it would restrict their policies toward same-sex couples. He said: "They wouldn't want their ability to offer benefits and that sort of thing limited. They think it's fair. They think it's important at least in case of some of their employees." On October 28, 2013, Indiana University announced its opposition to the proposed amendment. In November 2013, legislative leaders announced that the Indiana General Assembly would address the amendment in its next session. House Speaker Brian Bosma, a proponent of the measure, said that "This is not the most important issue facing us by far. We have to deal with the issue with dignity and respect... and bring this 12-year discussion to a conclusion." On December 4, the six Roman Catholic bishops of Indiana issued a statement that, without referencing the legislation, reiterated their position that marriage is "the intimate communion of life and love between one man and one woman."

The language of the joint resolution was introduced in the 2014 legislative session on January 9. A companion bill was also introduced that provided clarifying language directing that the proposed constitutional amendment would ban same-sex marriages and civil unions but not domestic partnerships. Bosma said it was aimed at reassuring universities and localities that the benefits they provide employees under the designation "domestic partners" would not be affected by the adoption of the constitutional amendment, though other lawmakers disputed whether the language of the bill, if adopted, could control the interpretation of the constitutional amendment. The House Judiciary Committee held a hearing on the proposed amendment on January 13, but took no vote. On January 21, Bosma moved the proposed amendment to the Elections and Apportionment Committee. On January 22, that committee approved the proposed amendment by a vote of 9 to 3 with one absence. On January 27, the House voted 52–43, with 29 Democrats and 23 Republicans in favor, to remove the sentence addressing civil unions. The House approved the shortened version in a 57–40 vote the following day. On February 10, the Senate Rules Committee approved the identical one-sentence version in an 8–4 vote, and the Senate approved that version in a 32–17 vote on February 17. The text adopted was:

Only a marriage between one man and one woman shall be valid or recognized as a marriage in Indiana.

As the text of the amendment had been modified, approval in the 2015-2016 session was required in order to place the measure on the ballot. However, the General Assembly took no further action on the amendment and it was never placed on the ballot.

== Lawsuits ==
Same-sex marriage in the United States

=== Early cases ===
A lawsuit, Morrison v. Sadler, brought in 2002 by the American Civil Liberties Union (ACLU) on behalf of three same-sex couples seeking marriage rights and challenging the 1986 law that limited marriages to opposite-sex couples, failed in the Marion County Superior Court in May 2003. The judge ruled that restricting marriage to different-sex couples "promotes the state's interest in encouraging procreation to occur in a context where both biological parents are present to raise the child." Two of the couples had formed civil unions in Vermont in 2000. The ruling was upheld by the Indiana Court of Appeals on January 20, 2005. After the ruling by the Court of Appeals, when the third couple had formed a Vermont civil union and one couple had married in Canada as well, the plaintiffs decided not to appeal to the Indiana Supreme Court to avoid a negative outcome there that might influence other state courts.

On December 23, 2013, the Indiana Court of Appeals ruled in Davis v. Summers that Indiana's law banning same-sex marriage could not be used to invalidate a marriage if one spouse later changes their legal gender.

=== Baskin v. Bogan ===
Baskin v. Bogan was filed on March 14, 2014, in the U.S. District Court for the Southern District of Indiana by Lambda Legal on behalf of two same-sex couples, all women. The defendants were the Indiana Attorney General, Greg Zoeller, and three county clerks, with one of the county clerks, Penny Bogan, in her official capacity, as the first-named defendant. It took precedence over the other Indiana marriage cases, because one of the plaintiffs was terminally ill with ovarian cancer, though the case of her and her partner was soon separated from that of the other plaintiffs. On June 25, 2014, Judge Richard L. Young ruled with respect to the remaining plaintiffs in Baskin, as well as the cases of Fujii v. State of Indiana and Lee v. Pence. He found in favor of the plaintiff couples, granted them summary judgment and struck down Indiana's ban on same-sex marriage. He also removed Governor Mike Pence from the lawsuit. He issued no stay and Indiana clerks began issuing marriage licenses to same-sex couples the day of the ruling. The first couple to receive a license were Craig Bowen and Jake Miller in Indianapolis on June 25. The Seventh Circuit Court of Appeals brought license issuance to a halt on June 27. The Seventh Court consolidated Baskin and its companion cases, Fujii and Lee, with a similar case in Wisconsin, Wolf v. Walker. It heard oral arguments on August 26. On September 4, the Seventh Circuit, in a unanimous opinion authored by Judge Richard Posner, upheld the district court's decision. In a widely quoted passage from the ruling, Judge Posner wrote:

The challenged laws discriminate against a minority defined by an immutable characteristic, and the only rationale that the states put forth with any conviction–that same-sex couples and their children don't need marriage because same-sex couples can't produce children, intended or unintended–is so full of holes that it cannot be taken seriously. To the extent that children are better off in families in which the parents are married, they are better off whether they are raised by their biological parents or by adoptive parents.

On September 9, Wisconsin and Indiana asked the U.S. Supreme Court to uphold their respective bans on same-sex marriage. On September 15, the Seventh Circuit granted a motion for a stay of the ruling, to be in effect until the case was resolved at the Supreme Court. The Supreme Court declined to consider an appeal in Baskin on October 6, which allowed the Seventh Circuit Court of Appeals to implement its decision requiring Indiana to license and recognize same-sex marriages, effectively legalizing same-sex marriage in Indiana.

=== Love v. Pence ===
Love v. Pence was filed on March 7, 2014. Judge Young dismissed it for lack of subject-matter jurisdiction on June 25, because the only named defendant was Governor Pence, who cannot, he wrote, "issue executive decrees telling other elected officials how to do their jobs when it comes to laws affecting marriage." Judge Young reinstated that part of the suit concerning the recognition of marriages from other jurisdictions on September 16, citing Governor Pence's memos directing state officials how to respond to other court decisions on the issue of same-sex marriage.

=== Bowling v. Pence ===
The plaintiffs in Bowling v. Pence raised only the question of Indiana's recognition of same-sex marriages from other jurisdictions, not the state's refusal to grant marriage licenses to same-sex couples. One plaintiff couple was married in Iowa in 2011. A third plaintiff sought to dissolve her marriage established elsewhere. Judge Young issued his ruling in Bowling v. Pence on August 19, repeating the logic of his earlier decision in finding that the state's refusal to recognize same-sex marriages was unconstitutional. Though he had previously dismissed Love v. Pence after accepting the arguments of Governor Pence that the governor of Indiana lacked authority over the enforcement of the state's ban, Young reversed himself, citing actions Pence took following the decision in Baskin. Young noted that Pence, contrary to his earlier claims, had issued memos to state agencies instructing them to disregard the July 25 decision in Baskin. Pence had written on July 7 that Indiana's ban "[was] in full force and effect and executive branch agencies [were] to execute their functions as though the U.S. District Court Order of June 25, 2014 had not been issued." In his Bowling decision, Young wrote: "The memoranda issued by the Governor clearly contradict his prior representations to the court." He called Pence's earlier statements a "bold misrepresentation". He wrote that his acceptance of Pence as defendant "[was] not based on the Governor's general duty to enforce the laws. It [was] based on his specific ability to command the executive branch regarding the law." He commented: "The court, after witnessing the Governor do what he claimed he could not do, reverses course and finds him to be a proper party to such lawsuits. The court wishes to reiterate that it finds the Governor's prior representations contradicting such authority to be, at a minimum, troubling." Young stayed enforcement of his decision and the state announced plans to appeal on August 21. The ruling was stayed until the Seventh Circuit ruled on the merits in similar cases. It also stated that the ruling would remain stayed if the Seventh Circuit stayed its decision in the related cases. The state's appeal was dismissed on January 5, 2015.

== Developments after legalization ==
In January 2024, four Republican representatives, Christopher Judy, Joanna King, Michelle Davis, and Robert Morris, introduced a bill to ban same-sex marriage in Indiana and forbid the recognition of marriages validly performed out of state. The bill was widely considered unconstitutional by political experts and advocates, and failed to pass before the end of the legislative session in March 2024.

== Native American nations ==
The Indian Civil Rights Act primarily aims to protect the rights of Native Americans but also reinforces the principle of tribal self-governance. While it does not grant sovereignty, the Act affirms the authority of tribes to govern their own legal affairs. Consequently, many tribes have enacted their own marriage and family laws. As a result, the Baskin ruling and the Supreme Court's Obergefell v. Hodges ruling did not automatically apply to tribal jurisdictions. Same-sex marriage has been legal on the reservation of the Pokagon Band of Potawatomi Indians since May 8, 2013. The first same-sex marriage was performed for Daniel Hossler and Enrico Perez in Dowagiac, Michigan on June 20, 2013. Their marriage was also the first marriage ever performed on the reservation. Its Marriage Code (Potawatomi: Widegewen Dbaknegewen) defines marriage as a "civil contract between two (2) persons, regardless of their sex, creating a union to the exclusion of all others."

Native Americans have deep-rooted marriage traditions, placing a strong emphasis on community, family and spiritual connections. While there are no records of same-sex marriages being performed in Native American cultures in the way they are commonly defined in Western legal systems, many Indigenous communities recognize identities and relationships that may be placed on the LGBT spectrum. Among these are two-spirit individuals—people who embody both masculine and feminine qualities. In some cultures, two-spirit individuals assigned male at birth wear women's clothing and engage in household and artistic work associated with the feminine sphere. Historically, this identity sometimes allowed for unions between two people of the same biological sex. Potawatomi society has traditionally recognized two-spirit individuals, known as mnedokwé (pronounced [mnədoˈkʷɛ], plural: mnedokwék), who "sought out female company" from an early age, possessed the "work skills" of both sexes, "talked like women", and were regarded as "esteemed persons with special spiritual powers". Ruth Landes reported in 1970 that they were "said to possess visions…but not to practice sorcery. [Mnedokwék] exemplified a distinct category of 'power'."

== Demographics and marriage statistics ==
According to the Indiana State Department of Health, 9,512 same-sex marriages were performed in Indiana between 2014 and 2019, a majority (68.1%) between lesbian couples. Same-sex marriages represented about 3.5% of all marriages conducted in Indiana during that time. The 2020 U.S. census showed that there were 10,953 married same-sex couple households (4,378 male couples and 6,575 female couples) and 9,232 unmarried same-sex couple households in Indiana.

== Public opinion ==
Public opinion for same-sex marriage in Indiana
Poll source	Dates administered	Sample size	Margin of error	Support	Opposition	Do not know / refused
Public Religion Research Institute	February 28 – December 8, 2025	443 adults	?	62%	35%	3%
Public Religion Research Institute	March 13 – December 2, 2024	393 adults	?	62%	32%	6%
Public Religion Research Institute	March 9 – December 7, 2023	423 adults	?	63%	34%	3%
Public Religion Research Institute	March 11 – December 14, 2022	?	?	67%	31%	2%
Public Religion Research Institute	March 8 – November 9, 2021	?	?	65%	32%	3%
Public Religion Research Institute	January 7 – December 20, 2020	1,083 adults	?	62%	33%	5%
Public Religion Research Institute	April 5 – December 23, 2017	1,531 adults	?	58%	34%	8%
Public Religion Research Institute	May 18, 2016 – January 10, 2017	2,288 adults	?	53%	38%	9%
Public Religion Research Institute	April 29, 2015 – January 7, 2016	1,938 adults	?	52%	38%	10%
New York Times/CBS News/YouGov	September 20 – October 1, 2014	1,405 likely voters	± 3.1%	43%	45%	12%
Princeton Survey Research International	October 8–21, 2013	600 interviews	± 4.8%	48%	46%	6%
Bowen Center for Public Affairs	November 12–24, 2012	602 adults	± 4.5%	45%	45%	10%

== See also ==
- LGBT rights in Indiana
- Same-sex marriage in the United States
