= Vern =

Vern is a masculine given name, often a short form (hypocorism) of Vernon, Lavern or other names. People named Vern include:

- Vernon Vern Bakalich (1929–2015), New Zealand rugby league player
- Verdi Vern Barberis (1928–2005), Australian weightlifter
- Vernon Vern Buchanan (born 1951), American politician, member of the U.S. House of Representatives from Florida
- Vern Bullough (1928–2006), American historian and sexologist
- Vernon Vern Burke (born 1941), American former National Football League player
- Vernon Vern Clark (born 1944), former US Navy admiral and Chief of Naval Operations
- Lavern Vern Corbin, American college basketball player (1926–1929)
- Vernon Vern Countryman (1917–1999), American Harvard Law School professor and social critic
- Vern Den Herder (born 1948), American retired National Football League player and member of the College Football Hall of Fame
- Vern Fleming (born 1962), American former National Basketball Association player
- Vern Fonk (1930–2006), American entrepreneur best known for founding Vern Fonk Insurance, a high-risk auto insurance agency
- Vern Freiburger (1923–1990), American baseball player
- Vern Gardner (1925–1987), American National Basketball Association player
- Vernon Vern Gosdin (1934–2009), American country music singer
- Vernon Arnold Haugland (1908–1984), American reporter, war correspondent and writer
- Vernon Vern Kaiser (1925–2011), Canadian National Hockey League player
- Vern Oliver Knudsen (1893–1974), American acoustical physicist
- Vern Krishna, Canadian law professor and accountant
- Vernon Vern Law (born 1930), American retired Major League Baseball pitcher
- Arild Verner Vern Mikkelsen (1928–2013), American National Basketball Association player
- Vern Miller (1928–2021), American attorney, former police officer, and former Attorney General of Kansas
- Vern Moore (footballer) (1895–1955), Australian rules footballer
- Vern Mullen (1900–1980), American National Football League player
- Vern Paxson, Professor of Computer Science at the University of California, Berkeley
- Vern Poore (fl. 1975–1996), American Oscar-winning sound engineer
- Vern Poythress (born 1946), American Calvinist philosopher, theologian and New Testament scholar
- Lavern Vern Pyles, American politician, former member of the Pennsylvania House of Representatives (1975–1980)
- Vernal Vern Riffe Jr. (1925–1997), American politician, longest serving speaker of the Ohio House of Representatives
- Vernon Vern Roberson (born 1952), American former National Football League and Canadian Football League player
- Vernon Vern Rumsey (1973–2020), American musician
- Vern Rutsala (1934–2014), American poet
- Vern L. Schramm (born 1941), American biochemist and professor
- Vern Smith (journalist) (1892–?), American communist, journalist and editor
- Vernon Vern Sneider (1916–1981), American novelist best known for The Teahouse of the August Moon
- Vernon Vern Stephens (1920–1968), American Major League Baseball player
- Verner E. Suomi (1915–1995), Finnish-American educator, inventor and scientist, considered the father of satellite meteorology
- Vern Swanson (born 1941), American politician, member of the Kansas House of Representatives
- Vern Taylor, Canadian figure skater (1970s) and coach
- Vern Terpstra (1927–2013), Professor Emeritus of international business at the Ross School of Business, University of Michigan
- Vern Tincher (born 1936), American politician, former member of the Indiana House of Representatives
- Delbert Lavern Vern Williams (1930–2006), American bluegrass musician

== See also ==
- Vern-d'Anjou, a commune in Maine-et-Loire, France
- Vern-sur-Seiche, a commune in Ille-et-Vilaine, France
