= Indiana House Bill 1041 =

Indiana House bill

Indiana State Legislature
- Full name: Participation in School Sports
- Introduced: January 4, 2022
- Sponsor(s): Stacey Donato, Jean Leising, Jack Sandlin, Dennis Kruse, Gary Byrne, Blake Doriot, R. Michael Young
- Governor: Eric Holcomb
- Bill: HB 1041
- Website: http://iga.in.gov/legislative/2022/bills/house/1041

Status: Current legislation

Indiana HB 1041 is an Indiana House bill which bars transgender girls from participating in girls' sports teams in K-12 (12th grade) schools. The bill passed the state House on January 27, 2022, and Senate on March 1, 2022. Governor Eric Holcomb vetoed the bill on March 21, 2022, and the veto was overridden on May 24, 2022.

The bill was authored by Indiana House Representative Michelle Davis with co-authors Chris Jeter, Joanna King, and Robert Heaton. It passed the state House on January 27, 2022, with a 66–30 vote and subsequently passed the state Senate on March 1, 2022, with a 32–18 vote. On March 21, 2022, the bill was vetoed by Governor Eric Holcomb citing a lack of evidence that girls' sports are currently unfair. The governor praised the work of the Indiana High School Athletics Association in his veto to keep sports impartial and contrasted it with the new bill. He also wrote that the bill would increase frustration among students, parents, and administrators as well as increase litigation among schools. The veto was overturned on May 24, 2022, with a 67–28 vote causing the bill to be passed into law. The law went into effect on July 1, 2022.

The legislation garnered controversy with prominent organizations like the ACLU and the Human Rights Campaign publicly opposing this bill.

Indiana HB 1041 instructs all K-12 schools and athletic associations to clearly classify sports teams as either boys', girls', or co-educational. It requires transgender girls to be excluded from girls' sports. The bill also dictates schools and athletic associations to design and maintain grievance procedures for infractions. It provides that schools and athletic associations are not liable for following the legislation's rules.

== Controversy ==
The author of this bill, Representative Michelle Davis, claims that the legislation's purpose is to protect girl athletes. She believes that transgender girls have a competitive advantage which would cause cisgender girls to miss out on the chance to compete fairly. Opponents of this bill counter that the statute would prevent transgender children from having opportunities afforded to cisgender children.

The American Civil Liberties Union of Indiana filed a lawsuit minutes after the bill was passed. The lawsuit was dropped in January 2023. The organization opposes this bill saying that it violates Title IX and the Equal Protections Clause of the U.S. Constitution. The Human Rights Campaign also criticizes the bill's passage calling the vote "discriminatory, unnecessary, and contrary to all evidence."
