= Lawrence Buell =

Lawrence Buell may refer to:

- Lawrence Buell (academic) (born 1939), professor of American literature
- Lawrence Buell (politician) (born 1934), member of the Indiana House of Representatives
