= Susie Swanson =

American politician (born 1948)

Member of the Kansas House of Representatives from the 64th district
- In office January 12, 2015 – January 14, 2019
- Preceded by: Vern Swanson
- Succeeded by: Suzi Carlson

Personal details
- Born: June 21, 1948 (age 78) Shawnee, Kansas, U.S.
- Party: Republican
- Spouse: Vern Swanson
- Children: 2
- Profession: social worker

Susie Swanson (born June 21, 1948) is an American politician. She has served as a Republican member for the 64th district in the Kansas House of Representatives since 2015, succeeding her husband, Vern.
