= Dan Burton =

American politician (born 1938)

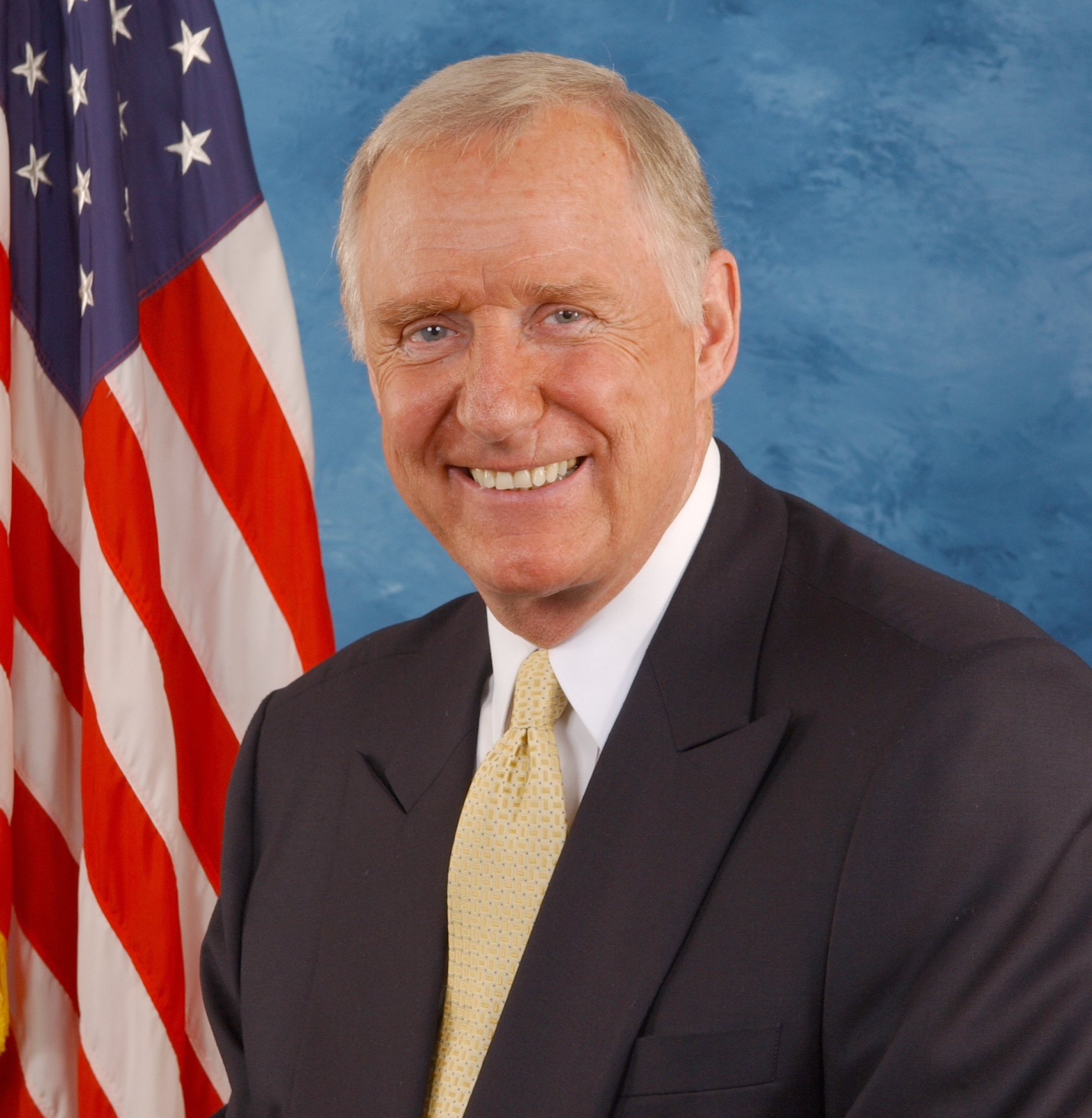

Chair of the House Oversight Committee
- In office January 3, 1997 – January 3, 2003
- Preceded by: William F. Clinger Jr.
- Succeeded by: Thomas M. Davis

Chair of the Republican Study Committee
- In office January 3, 1993 – January 3, 1999
- Preceded by: Tom DeLay
- Succeeded by: David McIntosh

Member of the U.S. House of Representatives from Indiana
- In office January 3, 1983 – January 3, 2013
- Preceded by: David W. Evans
- Succeeded by: Susan Brooks
- Constituency: 6th district (1983–2003); 5th district (2003–2013)

Member of the Indiana Senate from the 31st district
- In office December 4, 1980 – November 3, 1982
- Preceded by: John Mutz
- Succeeded by: William Vobach

Member of the Indiana House of Representatives from the 44th district
- In office November 3, 1976 – December 5, 1980
- Preceded by: Stanley Clark Boyer
- Succeeded by: Lawrence Buell

Member of the Indiana Senate from the 19th district
- In office November 6, 1968 – November 4, 1970
- Preceded by: Willie Hill
- Succeeded by: Willie Hill

Member of the Indiana House of Representatives from the 26th district
- In office November 9, 1966 – November 6, 1968
- Preceded by: Multi-member district
- Succeeded by: Multi-member district

Personal details
- Born: Danny Lee Burton; June 21, 1938 (age 88) Indianapolis, Indiana, U.S.
- Party: Republican
- Spouses: Barbara Logan (died 2002); Samia Tawil (m. 2006)
- Children: 4
- Relatives: Woody Burton (brother)
- Education: Indiana University, Bloomington; Cincinnati Christian University

Military service
- Allegiance: United States
- Branch: United States Army
- Service years: 1956–1962
- Burton's voice Burton on the progress of the House Oversight Committee's Chinagate investigation. Recorded March 19, 1998

Danny Lee Burton (born June 21, 1938) is an American politician who was the U.S. representative for Indiana's 5th congressional district, and previously the 6th district, serving from 1983 until 2013. He is a member of the Republican Party and was part of the Tea Party Caucus.

== Early life, education, and early career ==
Burton was born in Indianapolis, the son of Bonnie L. (née Hardesty) and Charles W. Burton. His father, a former policeman, was abusive to his mother, and never held a job for very long. The family moved constantly, living in trailer parks, cabins, and motels. In June 1950, some years after the couple divorced, his mother went to the police and got a restraining order against his father. He responded by kidnapping Burton's mother. Burton and his younger brother and sister were briefly sent to the Marion County Children's Guardian Home. After his mother escaped, Burton's father went to jail for two years. Burton's mother remarried, and Burton and his younger brother and sister had happier teenage years.

Burton worked as a caddy at a local country club in order to make ends meet, where he learned the golf skills that led to his winning a statewide golf championship in high school. He graduated from Shortridge High School in 1957, and attended Indiana University (1958–59) and the Cincinnati Bible Seminary (now known as Cincinnati Christian University) (1959–60). He served in the United States Army from 1956 to 1957, before leaving active duty to return to college but remained in the Army Reserves from 1957 to 1962. After school, Burton became a real estate broker and he founded the Dan Burton Insurance Agency in 1968.

== Indiana legislature ==
Burton was a member of the Indiana House of Representatives from 1967 to 1968 and again from 1977 to 1980 and the Indiana State Senate from 1969 to 1970 and again from 1981 to 1982.

== U.S. House of Representatives ==
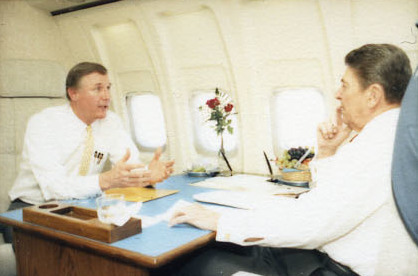
Burton with Ronald Reagan in 1987

=== Elections ===
Burton first ran for Congress in 1970, losing to Democratic incumbent Andy Jacobs in Indiana's 11th congressional district. Burton ran again in 1972, losing in the Republican primary to William Hudnut.

After the 1980 census, the Republican-controlled state legislature reconfigured the 6th district on the other side of Indianapolis into a heavily Republican district focused on the capital's northern suburbs. The district's four-term Democratic incumbent, David W. Evans, opted to challenge Jacobs in the Democratic primary (which he lost) rather than face certain defeat. Burton jumped into the Republican primary halfway into his second stint in the state senate, and won a five-way Republican primary with 37% of the vote. He then defeated Democrat George Grabianowski in the general election 65%–35%. He would be reelected 14 times, never dropping below 62% in a general election. His district was renumbered as the 5th district after the 2000 census.

2008

In 2008, Burton faced a reasonably well-funded challenger in the Republican primary for the first time since his initial run for the seat in former Marion County Coroner John McGoff. Burton defeated McGoff 52% to 45% in the closest Republican primary election of his career.

2010

In 2010, he faced six challengers in the Republican primary. He won the primary with a plurality of 30%. He defeated State Representative Luke Messer (28%), McGoff (19%), State Representative Mike Murphy (9%), Brose McVey (8%), Andy Lyons (4%), and Ann Adcock (3%). Burton only carried a majority in one county (55%): Huntington.

2012

In 2012, Burton was due to face a number of challengers in the Republican primary including McGoff, former U.S. Attorney Susan Brooks, former U.S. Congressman David McIntosh, and attorney Jack Lugar. On the Democratic side, State Representative Scott Reske and labor activist Tony Long entered the race. While the reconfigured 5th is still a Republican stronghold, it is said to be slightly more Democratic than its predecessor. On January 31, 2012, Burton abruptly announced his retirement, saying, "I don't want to get into it, it's about personal problems with family health." Brooks won the election.

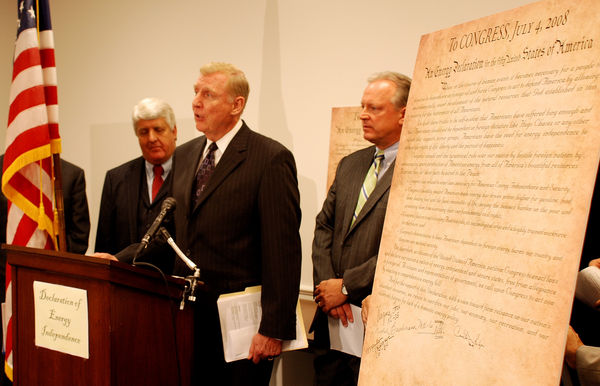
Burton speaking at the Declaration of American Energy Independence event in 2008

=== Tenure ===
Helms–Burton bill

In 1995, Burton authored legislation targeting foreign companies that did business with Cuba. The bill allowed foreign companies to be sued in American courts if, in dealings with the government of Fidel Castro, they acquired assets formerly owned by Americans. In February 1996, Cuba shot down two small Brothers to the Rescue planes piloted by anti-Castro Cuban-Americans. As part of the White House response to crack down on Cuba, President Clinton signed the Helms–Burton Act into law.

Conservative voting record

Burton was a consistently conservative vote in the US House. In the 109th Congress, he had a 100% rating from the National Right to Life Committee. He also has an A rating with the Gun Owners of America.

Burton has received a number of awards from conservative groups, including a Friend of the Farm Bureau Award in 2004 from the American Farm Bureau Federation, a True Blue Award in 2006 the Family Research Council, eight Guardian of Small Business Awards from the National Federation of Independent Business and twenty-two Spirit of Enterprise Awards from the U.S. Chamber of Commerce.

Government Performance and Results Act

Burton was the primary sponsor for a 1998 effort, opposed by the Clinton administration, to require federal government agencies to do more strategic planning, establish more accountability measurements, and do more reporting on their performance. H.R. 2883, the "Government Performance and Results Act Amendments", was not enacted into law.

Exposing the Winter Hill Gang/FBI Corruption

In his role as chairman of the House Government Oversight Committee, Burton helped expose FBI corruption that led to the wrongful conviction of Joseph Salvati, Peter Limone, Henry Tameleo and Louis Greco for the murder of Edward "Teddy" Deegan. The three-year investigation that Burton spearheaded helped exonerate the four, who were eventually awarded $102 million by Judge Nancy Gertner of the District of Massachusetts.

Republican Study Committee

Burton served as chairman of the Republican Study Committee, a caucus of conservative House Republicans, during the 101st Congress. After Newt Gingrich yanked funding for the group in 1995, Burton joined fellow congressmen John Doolittle of California, Ernest Istook of Oklahoma and Sam Johnson of Texas in refounding it as the Conservative Action Team. The three men shared the chairmanship from 1994 to 1999. In 2001, the CAT regained its original name, the RSC.

Pro-Pakistan and Anti-India

Congressman Burton is a founding member and co-chair of Pakistan Caucus in House of Congress. His consistent support for Pakistan and his voting record has prompted the Indian media to describe him as "anti-India" in the past.

Burton has received at least $10,000 in campaign donations from Syed Ghulam Nabi Fai, who runs the Kashmir Center, a pro-Pakistan advocacy group. Burton was the chief supporter in Congress of the Kashmiri American Council, until it was revealed to be a front of Inter-Services Intelligence Directorate engaging in illegal lobbying activities on US soil.

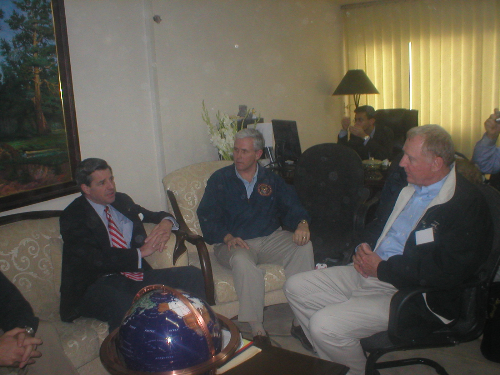
Burton and Mike Pence with Paul Bremer during the US invasion and occupation of Iraq in 2004

Support for Bahrain's monarchy

Burton has been noted for his vocal support of Bahrain's monarchy and criticism of protesters during the Bahraini uprising. In April 2012, Burton and his wife took a paid trip to Bahrain to meet with the country's rulers. The $20,966 trip was paid for by the pro-monarchy Bahrain American Council, a non-profit group established by and closely linked to Policy Impact Communications, a lobbying firm founded by William Nixon.

=== Committee assignments ===
- Committee on Foreign Affairs
  - Subcommittee on Asia and the Pacific
  - Subcommittee on Europe and Eurasia (Chair)
- Committee on Oversight and Government Reform
  - Subcommittee on Health Care, District of Columbia, Census and the National Archives
  - Subcommittee on National Security, Homeland Defense and Foreign Operations

== Post-Congressional career ==
On February 13, 2013, the Azerbaijan America Alliance announced his appointment as Chairman of the group. Burton is listed as chairman on the organization's web site as well.

In October 2015, it was reported that Burton registered as a lobbyist on behalf of the Citizens Commission on Human Rights (CCHR), an organization established by the Church of Scientology. CCHR advocates against psychiatry and psychiatric medicine, and is critical of the Food and Drug Administration (FDA). It has been described by critics as a Scientology front group. While not a member of the Church, Burton attended the opening of the Church's national office in 2012 and has praised CCHR's work in the past.

== Controversies ==
=== Tainted funds from Pakistan ===
In July 2011, Burton was revealed by an FBI investigation to have received tainted election funds ultimately traced to the military intelligence services of Pakistan, apparently as a quid pro quo for "supporting to Pakistan's position on Kashmir". These funds were routed via the so-called Kashmiri American Council, run by Syed Ghulam Nabi Fai, later revealed to be a front for the Pakistani Military. Subsequently, Burton's office donated the funds to charity.

=== Vince Foster murder claims ===
Burton led the House inquiry into the 1993 death of Vince Foster, the deputy White House counsel to President Bill Clinton who committed suicide, but who Burton believed was murdered. He urged extensive investigation into the possible involvement of the Clintons and gained attention for re-enacting the alleged crime in his backyard with his own pistol and a cantaloupe standing in for Foster's head. In 1998, Burton said of Clinton, "If I could prove 10 percent of what I believe happened [regarding the death of Foster], he'd be gone. This guy's a scumbag. That's why I'm after him."

After hearings into Democratic fundraising (see section below) began, a Democratic National Committee staffer appeared in a pumpkin suit with a button that read, "Don't shoot". Burton's information during the Whitewater controversy was based on research conducted by Floyd Brown, who founded Citizens United in 1988. Due to problems with the quality of Brown's research and testimony, the investigation was closed.

=== Golfing ===
In 1990, The New York Times reported that in 1989, Burton had been a "celebrity player" at the Bob Hope Classic in Palm Springs, California, the Kemper Open in Potomac, Maryland, the Larry Bird Golf Classic in Indianapolis, the Danny Thompson Memorial Tournament in Sun Valley, Idaho, the Sugarloaf Invitational tournament in Maine and the Arte Johnson Tournament in Chicago. Such players received free airline flights, free meals, and free lodging from tournament sponsors and, often, free merchandise.

In November 1995, the House voted to prohibit members and their staffs from receiving gifts, including free meals and free travel to charity sports events. Burton, who led the effort to exempt charity trips, said that he played in two golf tournaments each year, and, "We get more of these lobbyists in our office than we do on the golf course."

In January 1997, Burton played in the AT&T Pebble Beach National Pro-Am, at the invitation of AT&T Corporation, the tournament sponsor. The day before the tournament, he played a practice round with Robert E. Allen, AT&T's chairman and chief executive, at a nearby country club. AT&T also hosted a campaign fund-raising dinner for Burton at a local restaurant. Three weeks earlier, Burton had become the chairman of the House Committee on Government Reform and Oversight, which had jurisdiction over the legislative agency scheduled to soon award at least $5 billion in long-distance and local telephone and telecommunications contracts with the federal government. Burton defended his participation in the tournament, saying it would not affect his objectivity when dealing with telecommunications issues. He said that he had partially paid for the trip, with his re-election campaign funds paying as well because he attended three fund-raising events while in California.

In December 2004, Burton and two aides flew to the island of Guam. The trip was paid for by the Guam government and tourism industry. In addition to some official events, including touring a military facility, Burton played in a charity golf tournament. After he returned, he tried to help Guam's tourism industry get a sought-after change in visa rules.

In January 2007, the House passed a measure by a vote 430–1 that banned members from accepting gifts and free trips from lobbyists and discounted trips on private planes. Burton cast the sole nay vote.

In February 2007, a review by The Indianapolis Star of votes in the House of Representatives for the past decade showed that Burton had missed all votes during the Bob Hope Chrysler Classic golf tournament for five years between 2001 and 2007. The tournament, the third event each season on the PGA Tour, pairs celebrities with golf professionals for four of the five days of play. Since 2004, Burton has played in a guest spot of the Eisenhower Medical Center, the primary charitable beneficiary of the event. The slot carries with it a commitment to donate $10,000 to the event; Burton has made arrangements with the hospital to do this over a period of time. Burton's campaign committee reported donating $1,500 to the medical center in December 2004 and $6,353 in January 2006.

The Indianapolis Star review also found that in 2006, Burton ranked last in voting among members of Congress from Indiana, missing 11 percent of the 541 recorded votes. In 2007, The Indianapolis Star rated his voting record as "one of the strongest in the House, with an attendance record consistently above 95%."

=== "... off the coast of Bolivia" ===
On March 29, 1995, during congressional hearings on the US war on drugs, Burton proclaimed that the US military "should place an aircraft carrier off the coast of Bolivia and crop dust the coca fields." It was later pointed out to him that (a) Bolivia is landlocked and has no coast (Burton was chairman of the Western Hemisphere Subcommittee); (b) the Bolivian coca fields (in the yungas and Amazon lowlands) are beyond the reach of any carrier-borne crop-duster, being separated from the nearest coastline (the Pacific coast of Peru and Chile) by the 20,000+ feet high peaks of the Andes; and (c) F-18s cannot crop-dust. While criticism of this misstatement was muted in Washington, it sparked a major anti-American backlash in Bolivia, derailing the same war on drugs that Burton purported to be speaking for.

=== Investigation of Democratic Party fund-raising ===
In 1997, Burton headed an investigation into possible Democratic Party campaign finance abuse, focusing on the 1996 presidential election. The committee investigation ran for several years and issued over 1,000 subpoenas of Clinton administration officials and cost over $7 million. The committee, and Burton's leadership, were labeled a "farce", a "travesty", a "parody", and "its own cartoon, a joke, and a deserved embarrassment".

In March 1997, as the investigation began, Burton was accused of demanding a $5,000 contribution from a Pakistani lobbyist. The lobbyist said that when he was unable to raise the funds, Burton complained to the Pakistani ambassador and threatened to make sure "none of his friends or colleagues" would meet with the lobbyist or his associates.

In May 1998, Burton apologized for releasing edited transcripts of prison audiotapes of Webster Hubbell, a former associate of President Bill Clinton. The edited transcripts omitted substantial information and differed significantly from the original recordings. Burton was harshly criticized by members of his own party, including Speaker of the House Newt Gingrich, who called the investigation a "circus" and chided Burton for initially refusing to admit any error.

David Bossie, the staff member who arranged the editing and release of the tapes, resigned on Burton's request. Noting that Burton had personally released the tapes and had supported Bossie's plans over the objections of other committee staffers and attorneys, Democrats urged Burton to step down as well. Minority Leader Dick Gephardt said, "A committee staff member should not be made the scapegoat for Chairman Burton's mistakes, missteps, and misdeeds." Burton said, "I take responsibility for those mistakes", but never resigned nor faced any consequences for his actions.

In President Clinton's final year in office, Burton was mentioned in a short film for the White House Correspondent's Dinner. President Clinton: Final Days, which depicted Clinton as a lonely man closing down a nearly-deserted White House. Clinton is shown hitting golf balls from the South Lawn, and gets excited when he hits a car parked in a spot near the U.S. Capitol that says "Reserved for Chairman Burton".

=== Autism ===
Burton has been an outspoken critic of what he terms the failure of government to determine the cause of an alleged autism epidemic. When his grandson began to show the signs of autism shortly after receiving vaccinations, Burton inferred the relationship to be causal: "My only grandson became autistic right before my eyes – shortly after receiving his federally recommended and state-mandated vaccines."

Burton was instrumental in pressuring the National Institutes of Health to launch a five-year, $30 million study of chelation therapy for cardiovascular disease.

In an October 25, 2000, letter to the Department of Health and Human Services, acting in his role as chairman of the House Committee on Government Reform, Burton asked the agency's director to get the Food and Drug Administration (FDA) to recall all vaccines containing the preservative Thimerosal. "We all know and accept that mercury is a neurotoxin, and yet the FDA has failed to recall the 50 vaccines that contain Thimerosal", Burton wrote, adding "Every day that mercury-containing vaccines remain on the market is another day HHS is putting 8,000 children at risk."

The U.S. Centers for Disease Control and Prevention did not agree that vaccines containing mercury caused autism, and the US FDA refused to ban the vaccines. Most manufacturers removed the preservatives from their vaccines anyway, with no resulting decrease in autism rates.

Burton maintained a page on his Congressional website called House.gov "Autism" which includes his speeches, transcripts from hearings, and newspaper articles on the relationship of autism and vaccines.

In a June 2017 episode of Last Week Tonight with John Oliver a C-SPAN 2 clip from 2002 of Dan Burton was used to highlight Burton's position on vaccines in relation to autism. In the clip Burton says, "I have yet to find any scientist who will say that there is no doubt, no doubt, that the mercury in vaccines does not contribute to autism. Now they'll say there's no scientific evidence, there's no studies or anything that proves that yet. But turn that around. There are no studies that disprove it either." John Oliver correctly highlights this as Burton's demand for "proving a negative" which he calls "an impossible standard".

=== Constituent mailings ===
An Arizona newspaper study ranked Burton as the fifth-biggest user of free congressional mail, sending constituents more than $190,000 worth of mail in 2007.

=== Daughter ===
In June 2007, Citizens for Responsibility and Ethics in Washington reported that during the 2001–2006 period, Burton's campaign fund had paid $143,900 to his daughter Danielle Sarkine, who manages his campaign office. It is not illegal for federal candidates to pay family members for political work, as long as they are paid fair market value, the Federal Election Commission has ruled.

=== Sibel Edmonds testimony ===
On January 6, 2008, FBI whistleblower Sibel Edmonds included Dan Burton's photograph among others featured in the "State Secrets Privilege Gallery" posted on her website, composing images of figures considered to be relevant to her case. Later, on August 8, 2009, she gave sworn testimony about Burton and others during a witness deposition before the Ohio Elections Commission in the Schmidt v. Krikorian case, in which she stated that he had engaged in "[E]xtremely illegal activities against the United States citizens ... and against the United States' interests" that involved covert operations by foreign governments and entities, but did not further elaborate on these activities, ostensibly due to the limitations applied by the State Secrets Privilege.

=== ADA ===
In 1989, Burton argued against the protection of HIV/AIDS sufferers under the Americans with Disabilities Act (ADA). He stated "The ADA is a last ditch attempt of the remorseless sodomy lobby to achieve its national agenda before the impending decimation of AIDS destroys its political clout. Their Bill simply must be stopped. There will be no second chance for normal America if the ADA is passed."

== Personal life ==
Burton's first wife, Barbara (Logan) Burton, was diagnosed with breast cancer in 1993 at the age of 56. She died in 2002 from breast and colon cancer. They had three children together: Kelly, Danielle and Danny. In August 2006, Burton married Dr. Samia Tawil in Park City, Utah. She was the internist who cared for Burton's wife during her cancer treatment. Tawil and her first husband had divorced in 2005.

In 1995 speaking of the then recent affairs of Republican Robert Packwood and the unfolding story of Paula Jones and Bill Clinton, Burton stated "No one, regardless of what party they serve, no one, regardless of what branch of government they serve, should be allowed to get away with these alleged sexual improprieties". A vocal critic of Clinton, he went on to say, "Above all, Dan Burton believes the people have a right to principled leadership and that character does matter". Three years later in 1998, the magazine Vanity Fair was to print an article detailing an affair which Burton himself had in 1983 which had produced a child. Before publication, Burton was forced to admit to fathering a son with a former state employee out of wedlock in 1983.

Burton's brother, Woody Burton, is a former Republican member of the Indiana House of Representatives, representing District 58.

Burton is a member of the board of advisors of the Institute on Religion and Public Policy. Burton is a 33° Scottish Rite Freemason, and a member of Evergreen-Oriental Lodge No. 500 in Indianapolis, Indiana.

U.S. House of Representatives
Preceded by David W. Evans	Member of the U.S. House of Representatives from Indiana's 6th congressional district 1983–2003	Succeeded by Mike Pence
Preceded by William F. Clinger Jr.	Chair of the House Oversight Committee; 1997–2003	Succeeded by Thomas M. Davis
Preceded by Steve Buyer	Member of the U.S. House of Representatives from Indiana's 5th congressional district 2003–2013	Succeeded by Susan Brooks
Party political offices
Preceded by Tom DeLay	Chair of the Republican Study Committee; 1989–1999; Served alongside: John Doolittle, Ernest Istook, Sam Johnson (1995–1999)	Succeeded by David McIntosh
U.S. order of precedence (ceremonial)
Preceded by Jimmy Duncan as Former U.S. Representative	Order of precedence of the United States as Former U.S. Representative	Succeeded by Bobby Rush as Former U.S. Representative
