= Kristina Box =

Former American public health official

Dr. Kristina McKee Box MD, FACOG
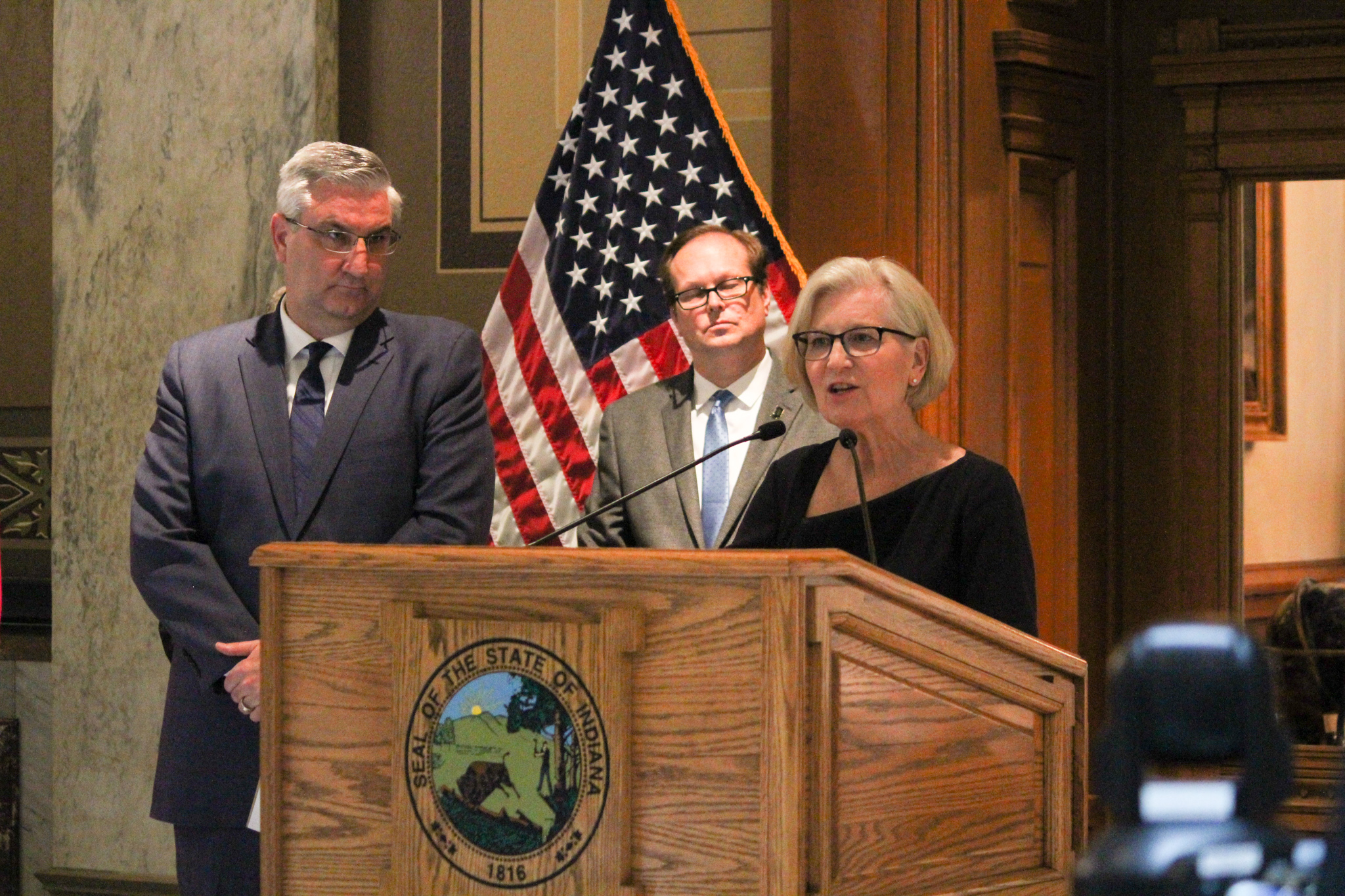
- Box with Indiana Governor Eric Holcomb, giving a press conference on COVID-19 on March 16, 2020.

State Health Commissioner of Indiana
- In office October 16, 2017 – May 31, 2023
- Appointed by: Eric Holcomb
- Governor: Eric Holcomb
- Preceded by: Jerome Adams
- Succeeded by: Lindsay Weaver

Personal details
- Born: St. John's, Newfoundland
- Spouse: David
- Children: Kathryn, Lauren, Jonathan, and Joseph
- Education: Indiana University Bloomington, Indiana University School of Medicine
- Occupation: physician
- Profession: obstetrician-gynecologist
- Nickname: Kris

Kristina "Kris" McKee Box is an obstetrician-gynecologist who served as the State Health Commissioner of the Indiana Department of Health from 2017 to 2023. She was noted for leading Indiana's response to the COVID-19 pandemic, as well as a focus on maternal health, infant mortality, and combatting opioid addiction.

== Early life ==
Box was born in St. John's, Newfoundland, Canada, while her father was stationed as a dentist on a U.S. Air Force base. Box's father and paternal grandparents are from Terre Haute, Indiana, where she later grew up as well. She explained that she was inspired to become a doctor during a sixth-grade health project on anatomy.

Box received her bachelor's degree in biology from Indiana University Bloomington. She received her medical degree from Indiana University School of Medicine.

== Career ==
=== Practicing physician ===
Box was an obstetrician-gynecologist within the Community Health Network—an Indianapolis-based hospital system—for more than 30 years. She began her career at Clearvista Women's Care in northeast Indianapolis in 1987. As a practicing physician, Box served in surgical medical missions to Haiti and Bolivia for more than 10 years.

Beginning in 2015, Box was the lead physician for the Community Health Network's Women's Service Line, a service which connects women in need with free health screenings. In this position, Box created Community Health's multidisciplinary women's center. She served at Community Hospital East on team treating substance use disorder in pregnant people. Box was a member of the Indiana Perinatal Quality Improvement Collaborative (IPQIC), which advises the Indiana State Department of Health, and served on the neonatal abstinence syndrome task force, studying the exposure of newborns to drugs in Indiana.

By 2017, Box began slowing down in her medical practice, planning to retire soon.

=== State Health Commissioner ===
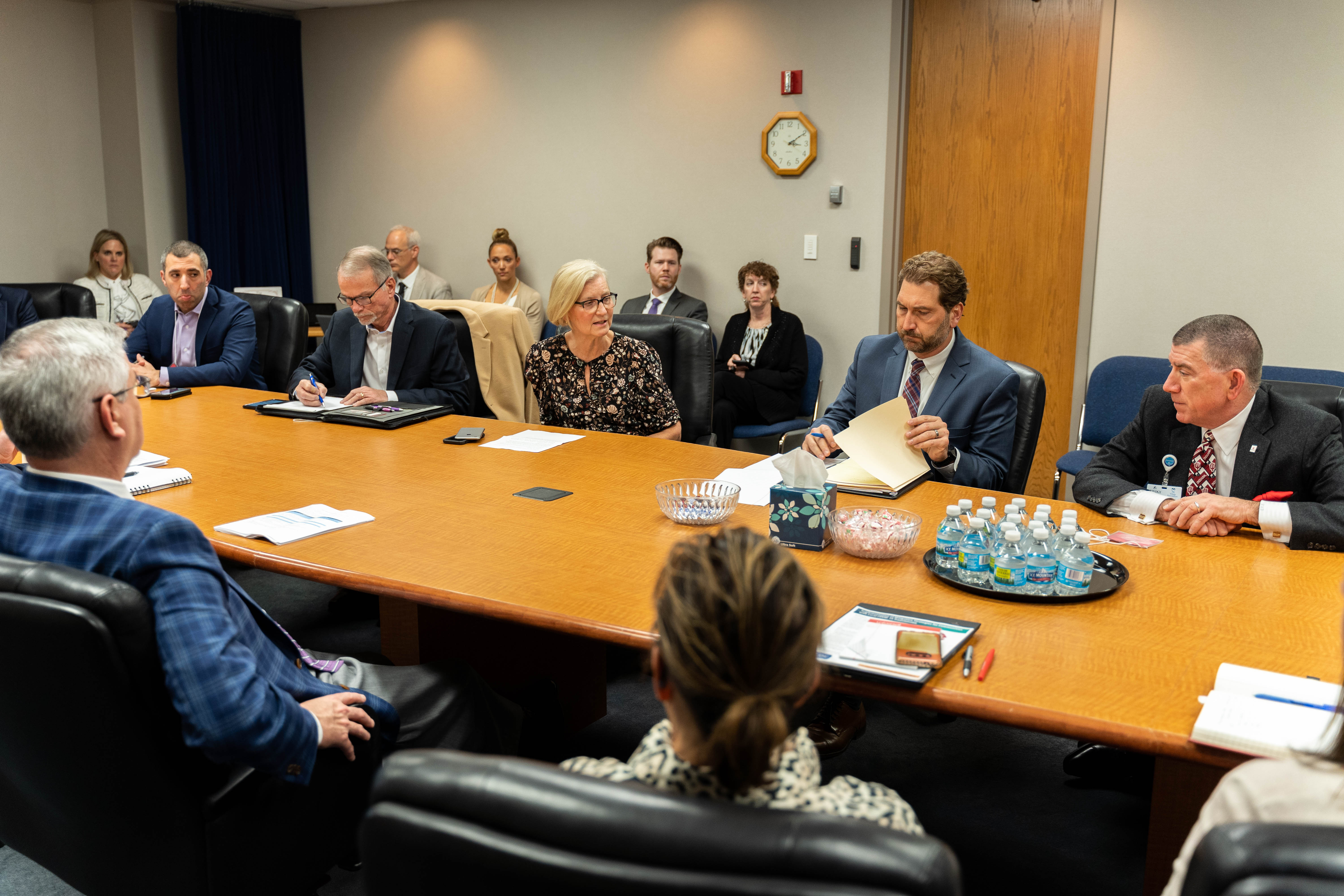
Box at a meeting of the Indiana State Department of Health during the COVID-19 response, with Governor Eric Holcomb and other officials, on March 11, 2020.

On September 18, 2017, Governor Eric Holcomb nominated Box to serve as Indiana State Health Commissioner, replacing Jerome Adams—who had resigned to become Surgeon General of the United States. Box took office on October 16, 2017. In his nomination, Holcomb called Box "uniquely qualified to lead our state’s efforts to curb infant mortality rates and attack the opioid epidemic".

After the start of the COVID-19 pandemic in Indiana in early 2020, Box was unexpectedly thrust into the spotlight, as one of the faces of the Holcomb administration's response to the disease. Box regularly joined the governor in high-profile press conferences, during the announcement of state policies such as a mask mandate and lockdowns. Box was a strong public advocate for vaccines, and led the state's distribution efforts, including state-sponsored mass vaccine clinics at locations such as the Indianapolis Motor Speedway. During her time helming the state's response to the COVID-19 pandemic, Box contracted the disease twice. She first tested positive in October 2020, before the availability of a vaccine, and then in January 2022, while vaccinated, during the outbreak of the COVID-19 omicron variant.

Outside of her COVID-19 response, Box's tenure was noted for her successful advocacy, with Holcomb's administration, for a huge increase of public health funding in a conservative state. In her last year in office, in 2023, the Indiana state legislature passed an increase in health funding from $7 million to $225 million, an increase of 1,500%.

In November 2020, Box was named the Indiana Chamber's Birch Bayh-Richard Lugar Government Leader of the Year. Throughout her time in state office, Box continued to practice at Community Hospital North in Indianapolis, including performing 24-hour labor and delivery shifts. Box reported the heavy demands of the job, sometimes working 12-hour days for 7-day weeks, in resigning in May 2023. Box announced her resignation on May 12, 2023, effective May 31, 2023; she was replaced by Dr. Lindsay Weaver.
