= Suzi Carlson =

American politician

Member of the Kansas House of Representatives from the 64th district
- In office January 14, 2019 – January 9, 2023
- Preceded by: Susie Swanson
- Succeeded by: Lewis Bloom

Personal details
- Born: Pittsburg, Kansas
- Party: Republican
- Spouse: Randy

Suzi Carlson is an American politician who served in the Kansas House of Representatives, representing the 64th district. She was elected in 2018, succeeding Republican Susie Swanson, who did not seek reelection.

A former cosmetologist, Carlson served for 21 years as the city judge in Clay Center, Kansas. During that time she also served as a city judge for Wakefield, Kansas, Green, Kansas, Longford, Kansas and Miltonvale, Kansas. She lost the Republican nomination for re-election in 2022, several months after being arrested on suspicion of driving under the influence of alcohol.

Kansas House of Representatives Committees 2019-2020

- Financial Institutions and Pensions
- Children and Seniors
- Social Services Budget

Kansas House of Representatives
| Preceded by Susie Swanson | Kansas House of Representatives Representative from the 64th District; 2019 - 2023 | Succeeded by Lewis Bloom |
