= Lewis Bloom =

American politician

Member of the Kansas House of Representatives from the 64th district
- Incumbent
- Assumed office January 9, 2023
- Preceded by: Suzi Carlson

Personal details
- Party: Republican
- Spouse: Linda
- Children: 3
- Education: Kansas State University
- Occupation: Farmer

Lewis "Bill" Bloom is an American politician who has served in the Kansas House of Representatives from the 64th district since January 9, 2023. He won the seat in the 2022 Kansas House of Representatives election succeeding Suzi Carlson, who did not seek reelection.

== Personal life ==
Bloom is a Methodist and lives with his wife, Linda, an elementary school teacher. They have three children and 8 grandchildren together. He served six years in the Kansas National Guard. He is a 7th generation farmer
