= Henderson v. Box =

US court case

- Court: United States Court of Appeals for the Seventh Circuit
- Full case name: Ashlee and Ruby Henderson et al. v. Kristina Box
- Decided: January 17, 2020

Case history
- Appealed from: United States District Court for the Southern District of Indiana
- Appealed to: Supreme Court of the United States

Court membership
- Judges sitting: Joel Flaum, Frank Easterbrook, Diane Sykes

Case opinions
- Decision by: Frank Easterbrook, joined by unanimous

Henderson v. Box was a case in which the United States Court of Appeals for the Seventh Circuit ruled that Indiana must list same-sex parents on their child's birth certificate. The case was brought before the court by eight lesbian couples from Indiana who conceived through artificial insemination.

== Background ==
While Indiana began allowing same-sex couples to marry in 2015 following the Supreme Court's ruling on Obergefell v. Hodges, the Indiana Department of Vital Records refused to list same-sex spouses on their children' birth certificates. Indiana's birth certificate system would not list the birth mother's wife's name unless they adopted their children and children of same-sex parents would be deemed to have been born "out of wedlock". Married opposite-sex couples with children are granted "presumption of parenthood", wherein the husband of the mother is assumed to be the child's father. This presumption of parenthood was not extended to non-biological parents and non-birth mothers.

Eight lesbian couples who conceived children through sperm donation filed a lawsuit to have both parents listed on their children's birth certificates. In 2016, the federal District Court for the Southern District of Indiana ordered the state to place the spouses of people who gave birth on their children's birth certificate, regardless of the spouses' gender.

== Opinion of the Court ==
On January 17, 2020, the United States Court of Appeals for the Seventh Circuit published an opinion written by Judge Easterbrook confirming that Indiana's parentage system discriminated against same-sex parents. The Court held that the rules violated the precedent established in Obergefell v. Hodges and Pavan v. Smith. The Court affirmed the district court's decision by acknowledging Indiana's refusal to recognize both married parents as unconstitutional under the Due Process Clause and the Equal Protection Clause of the Fourteenth Amendment.

== Supreme Court appeal ==
In June 2020, Indiana's Attorney General Curtis Hill filed a petition to the Supreme Court, requesting it to review the federal appeals court's ruling. In November, he filed a brief, making a case for the reversal of the court's decision. In December, the Supreme Court declined to take up the case, in what was deemed a victory for LGBTQ families.
