= Woody Burton =

American politician

Member of the Indiana House of Representatives from the 58th district
- In office November 9, 1988 – November 4, 2020
- Preceded by: Herbert Jack Mullendore
- Succeeded by: Michelle Davis

Personal details
- Born: June 11, 1945 (age 81) Indianapolis, Indiana
- Party: Republican
- Spouse: Volly
- Children: 3
- Relatives: Dan Burton
- Profession: real estate broker

Charles "Woody" Burton (born June 11, 1945) is an American politician. He was a member of the Indiana House of Representatives from the 58th District from 1988 through 2020. He is a member of the Republican party. Burton served on the Johnson County Council from 1980 to 1984. His brother is former Congressman Dan Burton.
