= Bob Heaton =

American politician from Indiana

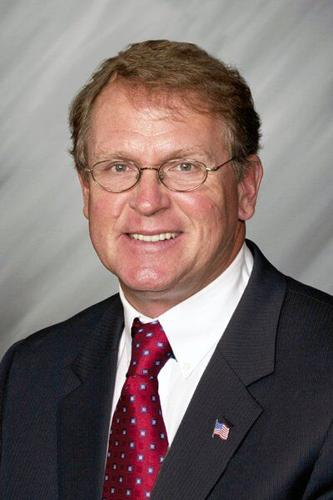

Majority Whip of the Indiana House of Representatives
- Incumbent
- Assumed office November 4, 2014

Member of the Indiana House of Representatives from the 46th district
- Incumbent
- Assumed office November 16, 2010
- Preceded by: Vern Tincher

Personal details
- Born: September 28, 1956 (age 70) Clay City, Indiana, U.S.
- Party: Republican
- Spouse: Jane Ann
- Education: Indiana State University
- Basketball career

Career information
- High school: Clay City High School
- College: Indiana State University

Robert Heaton (born September 28, 1956) is an American politician and basketball player who is a Republican member of the Indiana House of Representatives since 2010. He is the House Majority Whip.

While at Indiana State University, Heaton was a prominent member of the college's varsity basketball team that famously reached the final of the 1979 NCAA Division I Basketball Tournament. Heaton averaged 9 points during the NCAA Tournament, including a buzzer-beating game-winner against Arkansas which propelled the Sycamores to the Final Four.

== Basketball career ==
=== High school ===
Heaton led the Clay City Eels to the finals of the 1974 Evansville Semi-state and the finals of the 1975 Terre Haute Regional. During his junior and senior, the Eels had a record of 43–4.

=== College ===
Heaton spent two seasons (1975–76 and 1976–77) at the University of Denver, leading the Pioneers in scoring (averaging 11.7 points) as a sophomore. He transferred to Indiana State after the 1977 season as Denver had decided to transition its basketball program from Division I to Division II. Heaton spent the 1978–79 and 1979–80 seasons at Indiana State, helping the Sycamores reach the 1979 NCAA Division I Championship game.

While at Indiana State, Heaton was pictured on a 1979 Sports Illustrated cover with basketball legend Earvin "Magic" Johnson. "I never expected my face to be on the cover," Heaton would later tell Sports Illustrated. "In fact, it wasn't. But friends say the picture shows my best side: my backside."

== Political career ==
=== District 46 ===
Heaton represents Indiana's House District 46, which includes the counties of Clay, Monroe, Owen, and Vigo. As of the 2010 census, a total of 64,836 people reside within the House district.

=== State representative ===
In 2010, Heaton defeated Bionca Gambill by over 4,000 votes. In 2012 and 2014, he defeated challenger James Mann II by a large margin. One of Heaton's greatest achievements during his tenure is securing state money to help renovate the Hulman Center in the 2015 General Assembly Session. Heaton ran for in reelection in 2016 and won. He defeated Bill Breeden by a margin of 17,300 to 9,369. Heaton ran for reelection in 2020 unopposed. Heaton co-authored Indiana HB 1041, a bill that prohibits transgender women from participating in women's sports. Governor Holcomb vetoed the bill, but it was overruled. Heaton ran for reelection in 2022 and won. He defeated Kurtis Cummings by 71%.
