= Indiana HB 1447 =

Book banning law in Indiana, United States

Indiana State Legislature
- Full name: Education matters
- Introduced: May 2023
- Sponsor(s): Stacey Donato, Jeff Raatz
- Governor: Eric Holcomb
- Bill: 1447
- Website: iga.in.gov/legislative/2023/bills/house/1447/details

Status: Current legislation

Indiana HB 1147 is a bill that allows lawmakers to ban books deemed harmful to minors based on complaints submitted by parents. The bill also specifies requirements for third party surveyors and vendors.

== Contents ==
The bill requires schools to craft and enforce policy that prohibits material in libraries or classrooms deemed harmful to minors. Through this bill, school libraries are required to publish an online catalogue of their material, while also making it possible for parents to contest books or material they no longer want in the library. Librarians also would be more open to lawsuits and felony charges for sharing material deems unsuitable for minors, which could result in fines and jail time. The bill also deals with third party surveyors pertaining to schools.

== Legislative history ==
In May 2023, Governor Eric Holcomb signed the bill with the controversial measures into law.

== Similar legislation ==
This bill is noted to be similar to Senate Bill 12 and Senate Bill 380 and said to have been derived from both these bills.

== Controversy ==
This law is noted to be a part of a larger Republican wave across the country to enforce book banning measures. Critics of the bill say that while Republican lawmakers claim it's to prevent pornographic material from being in schools, no Republican lawmaker has brought evidence that pornography is within schools to warrant the bill's measures. Librarians and teachers are not allowed to claim a material's educational value to protect them from prosecution, which may open them up to felony charges and lawsuits. It is also noted that a single parent may be able to contest a book or material despite other parents' approval. Democrats also claim that this will pave the way for banning of LGBTQ+ material, but Republicans dispute this, claiming to only target pornographic material.
