= Opioid addiction treatment in United States prisons =

Alongside the general opioid epidemic in the United States, there has been an increase in the number of incarcerated people in the United States experiencing opioid use disorder (also called opioid addiction). Over half of the estimated 7 million incarcerated people in the United States meet the Diagnostic and Statistical Manual for Mental Disorders (DSM) criteria for substance use disorder, and only 20% receive treatment. To alleviate this problem, the United States Department of Corrections has implemented various treatment plans and programs for inmates.

== Historical approaches to treatment ==
In the 1980s, there was a movement to crack down on drug users and dealers by using harsher sentences. This created a rapid increase in the number of people in prison that were abusing drugs. The Department of Corrections implemented many prison-based drug treatment programs to help those with addiction, but the DOC was met with many opposers. There was a strong belief that "nothing works" when it comes to trying to rehabilitate people in prison, meaning that people in prison were untreatable, and thus any treatment used to help with drug addiction would be a waste of resources and effort. Based on this idea, the Department of Corrections took a harsh approach, focusing on retribution instead of rehabilitation. Those who had an addiction at the time of incarceration had to go through detoxification (detox) and withdrawal without special treatment to mitigate adverse symptoms. For people who went through this process, upon being released from prison there was a high likelihood of relapse (becoming addicted again). To help this problem, there were attempts made to establish drug treatment programs in prison even though many did not agree with them.

=== Cornerstone ===
The Cornerstone program was created in 1976 to be a pre-release treatment program. Prisoners in this program were allowed to live in a residential unit on the grounds of a hospital, separate from the main prison building.

Not all prisoners had access to this program. Prisoners who wanted to participate had to get a referral from a prison counselor, and during treatment it was not guaranteed that the prisoner would remain in the program. Prisoners had to follow a strict set of rules with serious consequences; any violation of the major rules, such as rules banning drug use and violence, would result in an automatic release from the program, at which point the prisoner would be moved back to the main prison building. Minor infractions were used to practice appropriate behavior and good behavior lead to incentives.

=== Stay'n Out ===
Stay'n Out was created to be a therapeutic community for people incarcerated for drug offenses. This program was established in 1977 for males and 1978 for females. Prisoners in this program were housed in living facilities that were separate from the general population of the prison, but they still interacted with inmates who were not in the program during much of the day. A majority of the program staff were former addicts who had successful experiences in therapeutic communities.

The rules and conditions of the Stay'n Out program were similar to Cornerstone's; there was a strict set of rules and regulations that the inmates had to follow, and when an inmate broke these rules, they would be released from the program and sent to live with the general population again.

== Current treatment approaches and programs ==
=== Principles for Drug Treatment Programs ===
To improve opioid treatment programs in the criminal justice setting, the National Institute on Drug Abuse created 13 principles to help shape programs. These principles provide guidelines for creating new treatment programs and are used to help increase the likelihood the treatment programs will succeed. The 13 principles are:

1. Drug Addiction is a brain disease that affects behavior.
2. Recovery from drug addiction requires effective treatment, followed by management of the problem over time.
3. Treatment must last long enough to produce stable behavioral changes.
4. Assessment is the first step in treatment.
5. Tailoring services to fit the needs of the individual is an important part of effective drug abuse treatment for criminal justice populations.
6. Drug use during treatment should be carefully monitored.
7. Treatment should target factors that are associated with criminal behavior.
8. Criminal justice supervision should incorporate treatment planning for drug abusing offenders, and treatment providers should be aware of correctional supervision requirements.
9. Continuity of care is essential for drug abusers reentering the community.
10. A balance of rewards and sanctions encourages pro-social behavior and treatment participation.
11. Offenders with co-occurring drug abuse and mental health problems often require an integrated treatment approach.
12. Medications are an important part of treatment for many drug abusing offenders.
13. Treatment planning for drug abusing offenders who are living in or re-entering the community should include strategies to prevent and treat serious, chronic medical conditions, such as HIV/AIDS, hepatitis B and C, and tuberculosis.

The implementation of these principles have led to the creation of several treatment programs that are used today in the correctional system.

=== Medication ===
The treatment program that is implemented in the corrections system for helping those with opioid addiction is administering medications that help to decrease opioid use. There are two main groups of medications that are administered in prisons: maintenance/substitution medications, and relapse prevention medications. Maintenance/substitution medications are any medications that are opioid antagonists or partial antagonists. This type of medication stimulates opioid receptors and lowers cravings to reduce the risk of withdrawal. Relapse prevention medications are any that are receptor antagonists. The three most commonly used medications are burenorphine, methadone, and extended release naltxrone. Burenorphine and methadone are considered maintenance/substitution medications and naltxrone is a relapse prevention medication. These medications also help with reducing opioid-related overdose deaths, criminal activity, and infectious disease transmissions. However, using the medication alone is not effective. The medications work best when they are combined with behavioral counseling. This is known as medication-assisted treatment (MAT). Inmates who were treated through the medication-assisted treatment program are less likely to relapse after being released.

== Effectiveness ==
Opioid treatment in the correctional setting has created a vast improvement in the number of people with addiction in prison; however, there are areas that are still lacking. There has been a great deal of interest in helping those with opioid addiction in correctional facilities, but the treatment provided is not adequate. Only a small portion of the offenders have access to the treatment programs. Only 11% of inmates who needed treatment actually receive it. Not all prisons have the same programs, limiting those that can be helped. Treatment programs are also only for those who are incarcerated. Once a prisoner is released, treatment stops. This leads to many parolees relapsing a committing another crime.
