= Lawrence Buell (politician) =

American politician (born 1934)

Member of the Indiana House of Representatives from the 89th district
- In office November 9, 1994 – November 5, 2008
- Preceded by: Jack L. Cottey
- Succeeded by: John Barnes

Member of the Indiana House of Representatives from the 50th district
- In office November 3, 1982 – November 4, 1992
- Preceded by: Darrell Edward Felling
- Succeeded by: Daniel Leroy Stephan

Member of the Indiana House of Representatives from the 44th district
- In office December 18, 1980 – November 3, 1982
- Preceded by: Dan Burton
- Succeeded by: John Joseph Thomas

Personal details
- Born: September 5, 1934 (age 91) North Liberty, Indiana
- Party: Republican
- Spouse: Janis Buell
- Education: Indiana University

Lawrence L. Buell Sr. (born September 5, 1934) is an American former politician who was a Republican member of the Indiana House of Representatives, representing the 89th District from 1994 to 2008. He was previously a member of the Indiana House from 1980 to 1992.
