= Vern Tincher =

American politician from Indiana

Member of the Indiana House of Representatives from the 46th district
- In office 2004–2010
- Preceded by: Brooks LaPlante
- Succeeded by: Bob Heaton
- In office 1996–2002
- Preceded by: David Lohr
- Succeeded by: Brooks LaPlante
- In office 1982–1994
- Preceded by: George Edward McKee Schmid
- Succeeded by: David Lohr

Personal details
- Born: June 23, 1936 (age 90) Mitchell, Indiana
- Party: Democratic
- Spouse: Linda
- Education: Indiana State University
- Occupation: State police, bricklayer

Vern Tincher is a former Democratic member of the Indiana House of Representatives, representing the 46th District from 2004 to 2010. He earlier served from 1996 through 2002, and from 1982 through 1994.
