= Vernon Herbert Coleman =

American painter (1898–1978)

Vernon H. Coleman
- Born: Vernon Herbert Coleman; April 28, 1898; Norwalk, Connecticut, US
- Died: June 6, 1978 (aged 80)
- Education: Corcoran School of Art
- Known for: Painting
- Movement: Social Realism

Vernon Herbert Coleman (April 28, 1898 – June 6, 1978) was a marine seascape muralist artist and art teacher on Cape Cod. He painted more than 100 murals for the Works Progress Administration.

== Early years ==
Coleman was born in Norwich, Connecticut and studied at the Corcoran School of Art in Washington, D.C. He founded the Cape Cod Art Club (now the Cape Cod Art Association) in Dennis, Massachusetts which gives an annual award, the Vernon Coleman Memorial Award, in his name. He was the supervisor of art in the Barnstable Public School system for 20 years, retiring in 1964.

== Artistic works ==
Coleman was "a central figure in WPA programs in Barnstable", getting paid $17 a week for his work. He was enrolled in the Provincetown Artists group of the Federal Art Project where his style was described as "traditional realism." He was in demand as a WPA artist with one local sponsor stating that he was "very much of a boy scout in his feelings that Vernon Coleman must do these [murals]... they won't have anyone but Coleman do them."

Many of Coleman's WPA paintings depicted scenes and seascapes from 1920s and 1930s Cape Cod and are inside local public buildings such as the Barnstable Town Hall, Pope John Paul II High School, the Center for Creative Arts, the Centerville Recreation Building, and the Osterville Historical Society Boat House. Some of his mural work was painted directly on to plaster making it difficult to relocate. Seven mural paintings found behind "seven layers of wall" at a restaurant undergoing renovation became the subject of a restoration effort. Four murals were stabilized and remained at the restaurant and three were donated to the Osterville Historical Museum for restoration. Another mural in the former Barnstable High School building was the subject of a $20,000 renovation.

In addition to his mural work Coleman also created many oil paintings, some of which are collected in the Cape Cod Museum of Art.

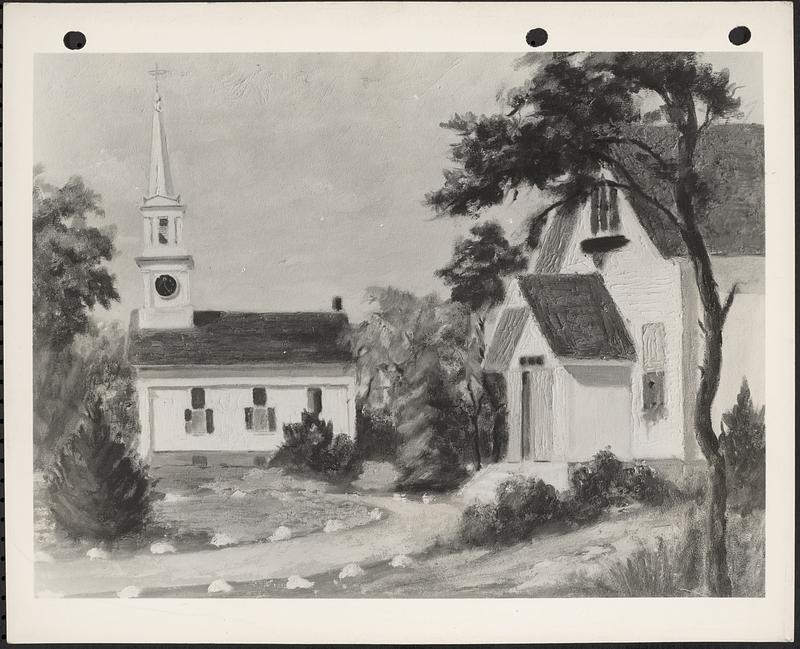

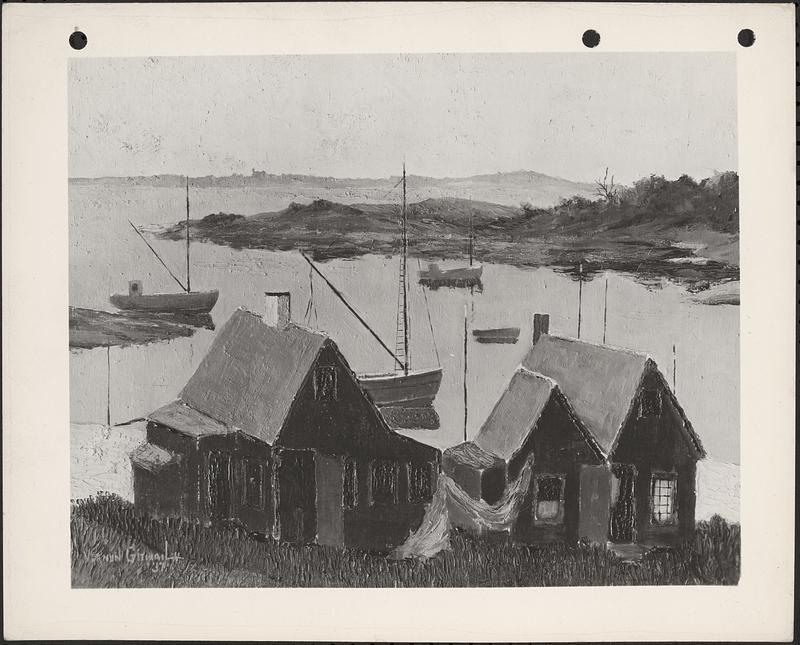

== Personal life ==
Coleman was married to Ruby Coleman and had one child, Vernon Ellsworth Coleman, in 1926.
