= Vern Swanson =

American politician

Member of the Kansas House of Representatives from the 64th district
- In office January 8, 2007 – January 12, 2015
- Preceded by: Kathe Decker
- Succeeded by: Susie Swanson

Personal details
- Born: July 2, 1941 (age 85) Clay Center, Kansas
- Party: Republican
- Spouse: Susie Swanson
- Education: Emporia State University (B.A.)

Vern Swanson (born July 2, 1941) is a former Republican member of the Kansas House of Representatives, representing the 64th district. He served from 2007 to 2015.

Swanson was born in Clay Center, Kansas and studied at Emporia State University. He was originally elected to the Kansas House in 2006, taking office in 2007; after serving for four terms there, he declined to run for re-election, and was succeeded by his wife, Susie Swanson. After his time in the legislature, he served on the board of the Kansas State Historical Society.

== Committee membership ==
- Energy and Utilities
- Transportation
- Transportation and Public Safety Budget (Vice-Chair)

== Major donors ==
The top 5 donors to Swanson's 2008 campaign:

- 1. Kansas Contractors Assoc $1,000
- 2. Koch Industries $1,000
- 3. AT&T $750
- 4. Twin Valley Telephone Inc $500
- 5. Kansans for Lifesaving Cures $500
