= Vernon Bruckerhoff =

American politician (1920–2012)

Member of the U.S. House of Representatives from Missouri's 127th district
- In office 1970–1977

Missouri House of Representatives

Personal details
- Born: July 31, 1944 St. Mary, Missouri, US
- Died: August 24, 2012 (aged 68)
- Party: Republican
- Occupation: teacher, farmer

Vernon E. Bruckerhof (July 31, 1944 - August 24, 2012) was an American Republican politician who served in the Missouri House of Representatives, and for years he was essentially the only Republican state representative from Southeast Missouri. He grew up on a farm near St. Mary, Missouri, and was educated at Catholic grade schools, St. Mary's High School in St. Mary, Missouri, and at Southeast Missouri State University. He became a teacher who taught at Marquand, Missouri, and Perryville, Missouri. Bruckerhoff later served in the Missouri Army National Guard.
