= Joanna King =

American politician and businesswoman

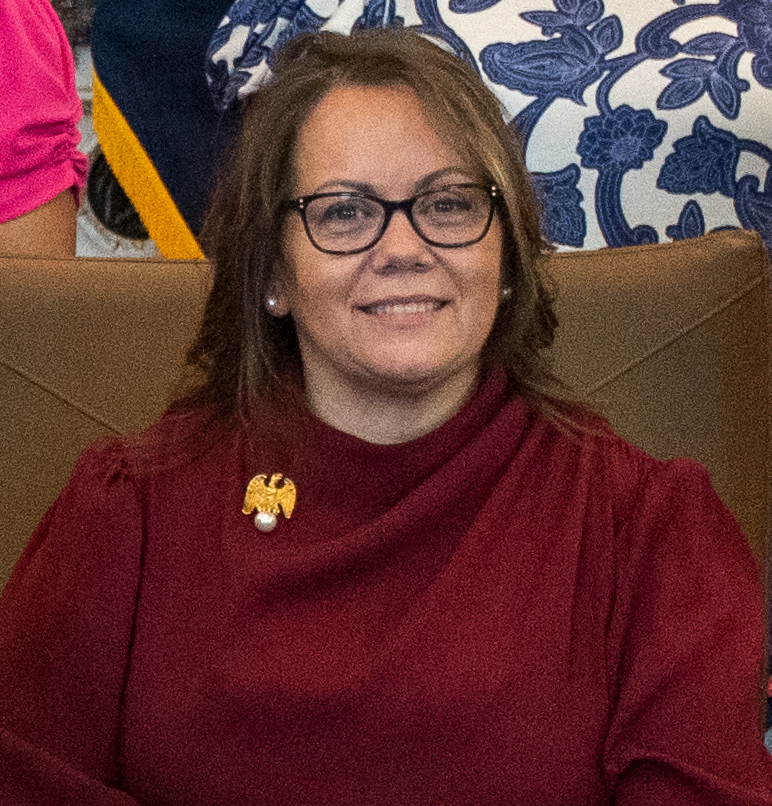

Member of the Indiana House of Representatives from the 49th district
- Incumbent
- Assumed office December 21, 2020
- Preceded by: Christy Stutzman

Personal details
- Party: Republican
- Children: 4

Joanna King is an American politician and businesswoman serving as a member of the Indiana House of Representatives for the 49th district. She assumed office on December 21, 2020.

== Education ==
King graduated from Northridge High School in Middlebury, Indiana.

== Career ==
After graduating from high school, King started a pretzel business. She and her husband operate the King Corporation, which includes tourism and hospitality businesses. She was an unsuccessful candidate for the Indiana Senate in 2016. In 2020, she was appointed to the Indiana House of Representatives.
