= Gary Byrne (politician) =

American politician

Member of the Indiana Senate from the 47th district
- Incumbent
- Assumed office February 14, 2022
- Preceded by: Erin Houchin

Personal details
- Party: Republican
- Spouse: Angie Byrne
- Children: 3

Gary Byrne is an American politician and businessman serving as a member of the Indiana Senate from the 47th district. He assumed office on February 14, 2022.

== Career ==
Byrne has been the president and co-owner of Byrne Satellite Systems since 1983. He was appointed to the Indiana Senate in February 2022, succeeding Erin Houchin. He ran for a full term in November 2022.

In January 2024, Byrne filed Bill 187 to prohibit public transportation agencies from offering free or reduced-fare rides on election days.

On April 21, 2025, Byrne announced controversial changes to Indiana State Senate Bill 442 removing the requirement for schools to teach consent as a part of sexual education in schools throughout the State of Indiana. He cited “different thoughts in different communities” and that it's a "sensitive subject for many” as reasons for the removal. Following community pushback, the requirement was returned to Senate Bill 442 on Wednesday April 23, 2025. He also co-sponsored a bill to gerrymander Indiana's congressional districts, which ultimately failed.

== Elections ==
2022 Indiana State Senate District 47
Party	Candidate	Votes	%	±%
Republican	Gary Byrne	28,959	66.8	
Democratic	Katie Forte	14,404	33.2	
Total votes		43,363	100.0	
