= Michelle Davis (politician) =

American politician

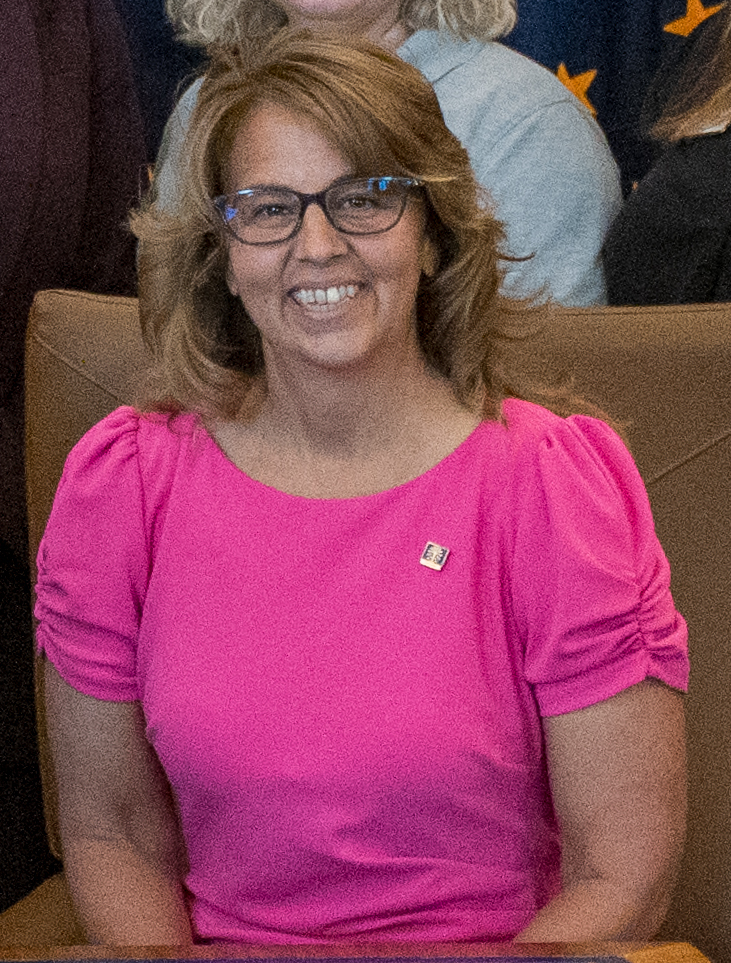

Member of the Indiana Senate from the 41st district
- Incumbent
- Assumed office November 4, 2026
- Preceded by: Greg Walker

Member of the Indiana House of Representatives from the 58th district
- In office November 3, 2020 – November 4, 2026
- Preceded by: Woody Burton
- Succeeded by: John Reed

Personal details
- Party: Republican
- Children: 2
- Education: Ball State University (BS); Purdue University (MEd)

Michelle Davis is an American politician formerly serving as a member of the Indiana House of Representatives from the 58th district. She assumed office on November 4, 2020.

== Early life and education ==
A native of Bargersville, Indiana, Davis graduated from Franklin Community High School. She earned a Bachelor of Science degree in elementary education from Ball State University in 1992 and a Master of Education in curriculum and instruction from Purdue University.

== Career ==
Outside of politics, Davis has worked at the Central Nine Career Center in Greenwood, Indiana. She was elected to the Indiana House of Representatives in November 2020. In 2021, Davis authored House Bill 1041, which would require "non-postsecondary schools to identify teams as either male, female or co-ed and bar transgender girls or women from competing in girls' or women’s athletics."

== Personal life ==
Davis and her husband, James, have two children. She lives in Whiteland, Indiana.
