= National Register of Historic Places listings in Vanderburgh County, Indiana =

Location of Vanderburgh County in Indiana

This is a list of the National Register of Historic Places listings in Vanderburgh County, Indiana.

This is intended to be a complete list of the properties and districts on the National Register of Historic Places in Vanderburgh County, Indiana, United States. Latitude and longitude coordinates are provided for many National Register properties and districts; these locations may be seen together in a map.

There are 98 properties and districts listed on the National Register in the county, including one National Historic Landmark. Another 11 properties were once listed but have been removed.

Properties and districts located in incorporated areas display the name of the municipality, while properties and districts in unincorporated areas display the name of their civil township. Properties and districts split between multiple jurisdictions display the names of all jurisdictions.

This National Park Service list is complete through NPS recent listings posted October 23, 2026.

== Current listings ==
| | Name on the Register | Image | Date listed | Location | City or town | Description |
|---|---|---|---|---|---|---|
| 1 | Albion Flats | Albion Flats | July 1, 1982 (#82000093) | 701 Court St. 37°58′33″N 87°34′10″W | Evansville | |
| 2 | Alhambra Theatorium | Alhambra Theatorium | October 1, 1979 (#79000047) | 50 Adams Ave. 37°57′44″N 87°33′57″W | Evansville | |
| 3 | American Trust and Savings Bank (Indiana Bank) | American Trust and Savings Bank (Indiana Bank) | July 1, 1982 (#82000094) | 524-530 Main St. 37°58′22″N 87°34′09″W | Evansville | |
| 4 | Angel Mounds | Angel Mounds | October 15, 1966 (#66000124) | 8215 Pollack Ave. 37°56′31″N 87°27′35″W | Knight Township | Extends into Warrick County |
| 5 | Auto Hotel Building | Auto Hotel Building | April 6, 1984 (#84001673) | 111-115 SE. 3rd St. 37°58′10″N 87°34′18″W | Evansville | |
| 6 | Baptisttown Historic District | | December 11, 2023 (#100009594) | Roughly each side of Evans Avenue and the east side of Linwood Avenue between Walnut and Lincoln, each side of Lincoln Avenue between Motion and Garvin, the west side of Garvin Street and each side of Elliott Street between Mulberry and Chandler, and ea [sic] 37°58′12″N 87°33′18″W | Evansville | |
| 7 | Barrett's Britz Building | Barrett's Britz Building | April 6, 1984 (#84001679) | 415 Main St. 37°58′18″N 87°34′14″W | Evansville | |
| 8 | Bayard Park Historic District | Bayard Park Historic District | June 27, 1985 (#85001373) | Roughly bounded by Gum, Kentucky, Blackford, and Garvin Sts. 37°57′56″N 87°33′06″W | Evansville | |
| 9 | William Bedford Sr. House | William Bedford Sr. House | November 28, 1978 (#78000056) | 838 Washington Ave. 37°57′49″N 87°33′03″W | Evansville | |
| 10 | Bernardin-Johnson House | Bernardin-Johnson House | June 27, 1989 (#89000238) | 17 Johnson Pl. 37°58′15″N 87°31′24″W | Evansville | |
| 11 | Bitterman Building | Bitterman Building | September 22, 1980 (#80000068) | 202-204 Main St. 37°58′14″N 87°34′23″W | Evansville | |
| 12 | Glenn A. Black House | Glenn A. Black House | December 21, 2011 (#11000660) | 8215 Pollack Ave., southeast of Evansville; 37°56′51″N 87°27′10″W | Knight Township | |
| 13 | John W. Boehne House | John W. Boehne House | February 17, 1983 (#83000105) | 1119 Lincoln Ave. 37°58′10″N 87°32′42″W | Evansville | |
| 14 | Building at 223 Main Street | Building at 223 Main Street | July 1, 1982 (#82000083) | 223 Main St. 37°58′15″N 87°34′21″W | Evansville | |
| 15 | Busse House | Busse House | July 1, 1982 (#82000084) | 120 SE 1st St. 37°58′07″N 87°34′23″W | Evansville | |
| 16 | Cadick Apartments (Plaza Building) | Cadick Apartments (Plaza Building) | July 1, 1982 (#82000085) | 118 SE. 1st St. 37°58′08″N 87°34′23″W | Evansville | |
| 17 | Willard Carpenter House | Willard Carpenter House | February 10, 1978 (#78000057) | 405 Carpenter St. 37°58′30″N 87°34′32″W | Evansville | |
| 18 | Central Library | Central Library | July 1, 1982 (#82000086) | 22 SE. 5th St. 37°58′17″N 87°34′09″W | Evansville | |
| 19 | Citizens National Bank | Citizens National Bank | July 1, 1982 (#82000087) | 329 Main St. 37°58′17″N 87°34′16″W | Evansville | Now Hilliard-Lyons Building |
| 20 | Conner's Bookstore | Conner's Bookstore | April 6, 1984 (#84001684) | 611-613 Main St. 37°58′22″N 87°34′08″W | Evansville | |
| 21 | Court Building (Furniture Building) | Court Building (Furniture Building) | July 1, 1982 (#82000088) | 123-125 NW. 4th St. 37°58′23″N 87°34′20″W | Evansville | |
| 22 | Culver Historic District | Culver Historic District | June 1, 1984 (#84001691) | Roughly bounded by Madison Ave., Riverside Dr., and Emmett and Venice Sts. 37°57′31″N 87°33′52″W | Evansville | |
| 23 | Eagles Home | Eagles Home | July 1, 1982 (#82000090) | 221 NW. 5th St. 37°58′28″N 87°34′18″W | Evansville | |
| 24 | Evansville Brewing Company | Evansville Brewing Company | July 1, 1982 (#82000091) | 401 NW. 4th St. 37°58′32″N 87°34′24″W | Evansville | |
| 25 | Evansville Downtown Historic District | Evansville Downtown Historic District | March 15, 2000 (#00000197) | Roughly Main St. bet. 2nd St. and Martin Luther King Jr. Blvd., 4th St., vet. Sycamore and Chestnut St. 37°58′14″N 87°34′14″W | Evansville | |
| 26 | Evansville College | Evansville College | February 3, 1983 (#83000106) | 1800 Lincoln Ave. 37°58′17″N 87°31′54″W | Evansville | |
| 27 | Evansville Journal News | Evansville Journal News | July 1, 1982 (#82000092) | 7-11 NW. 5th St. 37°58′21″N 87°34′12″W | Evansville | |
| 28 | Evansville Municipal Market | Evansville Municipal Market | December 22, 1983 (#83003771) | 813 Pennsylvania St. 37°58′41″N 87°34′33″W | Evansville | |
| 29 | Evansville Post Office | Evansville Post Office | July 2, 1971 (#71000010) | 100 block of NW. 2nd St. 37°58′18″N 87°34′28″W | Evansville | |
| 30 | Fellwock Garage | Fellwock Garage | April 6, 1984 (#84001701) | 315 Court St. 37°58′25″N 87°34′24″W | Evansville | |
| 31 | Firestone Tire and Rubber Store | Firestone Tire and Rubber Store | April 6, 1984 (#84001702) | 900 Main St. 37°58′30″N 87°33′58″W | Evansville | |
| 32 | Former Vanderburgh County Sheriff's Residence | Former Vanderburgh County Sheriff's Residence | October 6, 1970 (#70000009) | 4th St. between Vine and Court Sts. 37°58′25″N 87°34′22″W | Evansville | |
| 33 | Garvin Park | Garvin Park | August 29, 1980 (#80000069) | N. Main St. and Morgan Ave. 37°59′43″N 87°33′50″W | Evansville | |
| 34 | Fred Geiger and Sons National Biscuit Company | Fred Geiger and Sons National Biscuit Company | July 1, 1982 (#82000096) | 401 NW. 2nd St. 37°58′26″N 87°34′33″W | Evansville | |
| 35 | Gemcraft-Wittmer Building | Gemcraft-Wittmer Building | April 6, 1984 (#84001704) | 609 Main St. 37°58′22″N 87°34′07″W | Evansville | |
| 36 | General Cigar Company | General Cigar Company | March 15, 2000 (#00000212) | 223 NW. 2nd St. 37°58′22″N 87°34′30″W | Evansville | |
| 37 | German Bank | German Bank | July 1, 1982 (#82000097) | 301-303 Main St. 37°58′15″N 87°34′19″W | Evansville | |
| 38 | Greyhound Bus Terminal | Greyhound Bus Terminal | October 1, 1979 (#79000048) | 102 NW. 3rd St. 37°58′19″N 87°34′24″W | Evansville | |
| 39 | Harding and Miller Music Company | Harding and Miller Music Company | July 1, 1982 (#82000098) | 518-520 Main St. 37°58′21″N 87°34′10″W | Evansville | |
| 40 | Hebron Meadows Historic District | | December 1, 2020 (#100005870) | Roughly bounded by 4000-4311 Bellemeade Ave., 700-961 South Colony Rd., 700-901 South Meadow Rd., 698-961 Blue Ridge Rd., and the north side of Washington Ave. including 4020-4328; 37°57′54″N 87°29′58″W | Evansville | |
| 41 | Michael D. Helfrich House | Michael D. Helfrich House | May 24, 1984 (#84001710) | 700 Helfrich Lane; 37°59′05″N 87°36′23″W | Evansville | |
| 42 | Hooker-Ensle-Pierce House | Hooker-Ensle-Pierce House | April 28, 1977 (#77000022) | 6531 Oak Hill Rd., north of Evansville; 38°02′13″N 87°30′32″W | Center Township | |
| 43 | Hose House No. 10 | Hose House No. 10 | February 11, 1982 (#82000099) | 119 E. Columbia St. 37°59′04″N 87°33′41″W | Evansville | |
| 44 | Hose House No. 12 | Hose House No. 12 | June 17, 1982 (#82000100) | 1409 1st Ave. 37°59′28″N 87°34′28″W | Evansville | |
| 45 | Huber Motor Sales Building | Huber Motor Sales Building | April 6, 1984 (#84001715) | 215-219 SE. 4th St. 37°58′09″N 87°34′10″W | Evansville | |
| 46 | Edgar A. Igleheart House | Edgar A. Igleheart House | December 18, 1990 (#90001930) | 5500 Lincoln Ave. 37°58′13″N 87°29′01″W | Evansville | |
| 47 | Independence Historic District | Independence Historic District | February 1, 1982 (#82000102) | W. Franklin St. and Wabash Ave. 37°58′52″N 87°35′46″W | Evansville | |
| 48 | Indiana Bell Building | Indiana Bell Building | July 1, 1982 (#82000103) | 129-133 NW. 5th St. 37°58′25″N 87°34′16″W | Evansville | |
| 49 | Ingle Terrace | Ingle Terrace | July 1, 1982 (#82000104) | 609-619 Ingle St. 37°58′34″N 87°34′16″W | Evansville | |
| 50 | Koester/Patburg House | Koester/Patburg House | March 3, 1983 (#83000151) | 504 Herndon Dr. 37°59′49″N 87°33′25″W | Evansville | |
| 51 | Kuebler-Artes Building | Kuebler-Artes Building | April 6, 1984 (#84002895) | 327 Main St. 37°58′17″N 87°34′16″W | Evansville | |
| 52 | August Kuehn House | August Kuehn House | July 1, 1982 (#82000105) | 608-610 Ingle St. 37°58′36″N 87°34′17″W | Evansville | |
| 53 | Charles Leich and Company | Charles Leich and Company | July 1, 1982 (#82000106) | 420 NW. 5th St. 37°58′34″N 87°34′25″W | Evansville | |
| 54 | Liberty Baptist Church | Liberty Baptist Church | December 8, 1978 (#78000058) | 701 Oak St. 37°58′08″N 87°33′51″W | Evansville | |
| 55 | Lincolnshire Historic District | Lincolnshire Historic District | October 2, 1989 (#89001426) | Roughly bounded by Lincoln, Bennighof, Bellemeade, Lodge, Washington, Harlan, E. Chandler, and College; 37°58′01″N 87°32′24″W | Evansville | |
| 56 | Lockyear College | Lockyear College | April 6, 1984 (#84001729) | 209 NW. 5th St. 37°58′28″N 87°34′17″W | Evansville | |
| 57 | Peter Augustus Maier House | Peter Augustus Maier House | October 29, 1982 (#82000107) | 707 S. 6th St. 37°57′59″N 87°33′51″W | Evansville | |
| 58 | Masonic Temple | Masonic Temple | July 1, 1982 (#82000108) | 301 Chestnut St. 37°58′07″N 87°34′11″W | Evansville | |
| 59 | McCurdy Building (Sears, Roebuck and Company Building) | McCurdy Building (Sears, Roebuck and Company Building) | October 1, 1979 (#79000050) | 101 NW. 4th St. 37°58′22″N 87°34′19″W | Evansville | |
| 60 | McCurdy Hotel | McCurdy Hotel | July 1, 1982 (#82000109) | 101-111 SE. 1st St. 37°58′08″N 87°34′25″W | Evansville | |
| 61 | McJohnston Chapel and Cemetery | McJohnston Chapel and Cemetery | January 18, 1979 (#79000051) | Kansas Rd. and Erskine Lane at McCutchanville; 38°03′51″N 87°31′23″W | Center Township | |
| 62 | Mead Johnson River-Rail-Truck Terminal and Warehouse | Mead Johnson River-Rail-Truck Terminal and Warehouse | December 27, 1984 (#84000495) | 1830 W. Ohio St. 37°58′35″N 87°35′31″W | Evansville | |
| 63 | Montgomery Ward Building | Montgomery Ward Building | October 6, 1982 (#82000110) | 517 Main St. 37°58′20″N 87°34′09″W | Evansville | |
| 64 | Morris Plan (Central Union Bank) | Morris Plan (Central Union Bank) | July 1, 1982 (#82000111) | 20 NW 4th St. 37°58′20″N 87°34′19″W | Evansville | |
| 65 | National City Bank | National City Bank | July 1, 1982 (#82000112) | 227 Main St. 37°58′15″N 87°34′20″W | Evansville | |
| 66 | H.G. Newman Building | H.G. Newman Building | July 1, 1982 (#82000113) | 211-213 SE. 4th St. 37°58′10″N 87°34′10″W | Evansville | |
| 67 | O'Donnell Building | O'Donnell Building | July 1, 1982 (#82000115) | 22 NW. 6th St. 37°58′24″N 87°34′10″W | Evansville | |
| 68 | Oak Hill Cemetery | Oak Hill Cemetery | March 22, 2004 (#04000205) | 1400 E. Virginia St. 37°59′17″N 87°32′14″W | Evansville | |
| 69 | Ohio Street Bridge | Ohio Street Bridge | December 17, 1998 (#98001523) | Ohio St. over Pigeon Creek; 37°58′34″N 87°35′16″W | Evansville | |
| 70 | Old Bittermann Building | Old Bittermann Building | September 22, 1980 (#80000070) | 200 Main St. 37°58′14″N 87°34′24″W | Evansville | |
| 71 | Old Fellwock Auto Company | Old Fellwock Auto Company | April 6, 1984 (#84001735) | 214 NW. 4th St. 37°58′25″N 87°34′23″W | Evansville | |
| 72 | Old Vanderburgh County Courthouse | Old Vanderburgh County Courthouse | September 4, 1970 (#70000010) | Entire block bounded by Vine, 4th, Court, and 5th Sts. 37°58′26″N 87°34′20″W | Evansville | |
| 73 | Orr Iron Company | Orr Iron Company | July 1, 1982 (#82000116) | 1100 Pennsylvania St. 37°58′37″N 87°34′51″W | Evansville | |
| 74 | Parson and Scoville Building | Parson and Scoville Building | July 1, 1982 (#82000117) | 915 Main St. 37°58′30″N 87°33′53″W | Evansville | |
| 75 | Pearl Steam Laundry | Pearl Steam Laundry | April 6, 1984 (#84001738) | 428 Market St. 37°58′31″N 87°34′30″W | Evansville | |
| 76 | L. Puster and Company Furniture Manufactory | L. Puster and Company Furniture Manufactory | July 1, 1982 (#82000118) | 326 NW. 6th St. 37°58′33″N 87°34′18″W | Evansville | |
| 77 | John Augustus Reitz House | John Augustus Reitz House | October 15, 1973 (#73000047) | 224 SE. 1st St. 37°58′04″N 87°34′20″W | Evansville | |
| 78 | Ridgway Building | Ridgway Building | January 3, 1980 (#80000071) | 313-315 Main St. 37°58′16″N 87°34′18″W | Evansville | |
| 79 | Riverside Historic District | Riverside Historic District | November 14, 1978 (#78000059) | Roughly bounded by Southlane Dr. and Walnut, 3rd., and Parrett Sts. 37°57′50″N 87°34′10″W | Evansville | |
| 80 | John H. Roelker House | John H. Roelker House | April 6, 1984 (#84001741) | 555 Sycamore St. 37°58′24″N 87°34′11″W | Evansville | |
| 81 | Rose Terrace | Rose Terrace | July 1, 1982 (#82000120) | 301-313 NW. 7th St. 37°58′34″N 87°34′12″W | Evansville | |
| 82 | St. John's Evangelical Protestant Church | St. John's Evangelical Protestant Church | July 1, 1982 (#82000123) | 314 Market St. 37°58′28″N 87°34′28″W | Evansville | |
| 83 | Salem's Baptist Church | Salem's Baptist Church | July 1, 1982 (#82000121) | 728 Court St. 37°58′35″N 87°34′09″W | Evansville | |
| 84 | Michael Schaeffer House | Michael Schaeffer House | February 11, 1982 (#82001854) | 118 E. Chandler St. 37°57′58″N 87°33′47″W | Evansville | |
| 85 | Siegel's Department Store | Siegel's Department Store | July 4, 1982 (#82000122) | 101-105 SE. 4th St. 37°58′14″N 87°34′14″W | Evansville | |
| 86 | Robert Smith Mortuary | Robert Smith Mortuary | September 22, 1980 (#80000072) | 118-120 Walnut St. 37°58′08″N 87°34′20″W | Evansville | |
| 87 | Soldiers and Sailors Memorial Coliseum | Soldiers and Sailors Memorial Coliseum | May 10, 1979 (#79000052) | 350 Court St. 37°58′27″N 87°34′24″W | Evansville | |
| 88 | Sunset Park Pavilion | Sunset Park Pavilion | June 17, 1992 (#92000673) | 411 SE. Riverside Dr. in Sunset Park; 37°57′57″N 87°34′26″W | Evansville | |
| 89 | Charles Sweeton House | Charles Sweeton House | March 25, 2005 (#05000196) | 8700 Old State Rd., north of Evansville; 38°03′30″N 87°33′42″W | Center Township | |
| 90 | Trinity United Methodist Church | Trinity United Methodist Church | June 24, 2009 (#82005248) | 216 Third St., Evansville, Indiana; 37°58′08″N 87°34′13″W | Evansville, Indiana | |
| 91 | USS LST 325 (tank landing ship) | USS LST 325 (tank landing ship) | June 24, 2009 (#09000434) | 840 LST Drive, south of Evansville; 37°57′11″N 87°34′36″W | Pigeon Township | |
| 92 | Van Cleave Flats | Van Cleave Flats | July 1, 1982 (#82000125) | 704-708 Court St. 37°58′33″N 87°34′11″W | Evansville | |
| 93 | Victory Theater and Hotel Sonntag | Victory Theater and Hotel Sonntag | July 1, 1982 (#82000124) | 600-614 Main St. 37°58′22″N 87°34′08″W | Evansville | |
| 94 | Washington Avenue Historic District | Washington Avenue Historic District | November 28, 1980 (#80000073) | Roughly bounded by Madison and Grand Aves., E. Gum and Parret Sts. 37°57′51″N 87°33′27″W | Evansville | |
| 95 | Willard Library | Willard Library | September 28, 1972 (#72000014) | 21 1st Ave. 37°58′42″N 87°34′27″W | Evansville | |
| 96 | YMCA | YMCA | July 1, 1982 (#82000128) | 203 NW. 5th St. 37°58′27″N 87°34′17″W | Evansville | |
| 97 | YWCA | YWCA | July 1, 1982 (#82001853) | 118 Vine St. 37°58′20″N 87°34′31″W | Evansville | |
| 98 | Zion Evangelical Church | Zion Evangelical Church | July 1, 1982 (#82000129) | 415 NW. 5th St. 37°58′34″N 87°34′23″W | Evansville | |

== Former listings ==
| | Name on the Register | Image | Date listed | Date removed | Location | City or town | Description |
|---|---|---|---|---|---|---|---|
| 1 | Hillary Bacon Store (Woolworth's) | | July 1, 1982 (#82000095) | August 24, 1993 | 527 Main St. 37°58′41″N 87°34′09″W | Evansville | Burned down April 29, 1990 |
| 2 | Buckingham Apartments | | July 1, 1982 (#82000082) | May 5, 2011 | 314-316 SE. 3rd St. 37°58′03″N 87°34′10″W | Evansville | Demolished on November 18, 1998 |
| 3 | Daescher Building | | July 1, 1982 (#82000089) | December 6, 1995 | 12-12½ SE. 2nd St. | Evansville | Demolished in September, 1995 |
| 4 | Andrew Hutchinson House | | July 1, 1982 (#82000101) | June 27, 1991 | 410 Fulton Ave. | Evansville | |
| 5 | Louisville and Nashville Railroad Station | Louisville and Nashville Railroad Station | August 24, 1979 (#79000049) | June 14, 1985 | 300 Fulton Ave. | Evansville | Demolished February 27, 1985 |
| 6 | Damron Nienaber Commercial Block | | July 1, 1982 (#82000114) | February 1, 1989 | 325 SE. 8th St. | Evansville | Destroyed by fire, August, 1988. |
| 7 | Old Hose House No. 4 | | July 1, 1982 (#82001856) | June 8, 2011 | 623 Ingle St. 37°58′35″N 87°34′16″W | Evansville | |
| 8 | Patrick Henry Richardt House | | July 1, 1982 (#82000119) | July 16, 1986 | 213 NW. 5th St. | Evansville | |
| 9 | Skora Building | | July 1, 1982 (#82001855) | November 4, 2009 | 101-103 NW. 2nd St. 37°58′18″N 87°34′26″W | Evansville | Demolished on January 26, 2006 |
| 10 | Wabash Valley Motor Company | | July 1, 1982 (#82000126) | June 8, 2011 | 206-208 SE. 8th St. 37°58′19″N 87°33′54″W | Evansville | |
| 11 | Walnut Street School | | July 1, 1982 (#82000127) | November 13, 1987 | Walnut and 9th Sts. | Evansville | |

== See also ==
- List of National Historic Landmarks in Indiana
- National Register of Historic Places listings in Indiana
- Listings in neighboring counties: Gibson, Henderson (KY), Posey, Warrick
- List of Indiana state historical markers in Vanderburgh County
