= Gemcraft–Wittmer Building =

- U.S. National Register of Historic Places
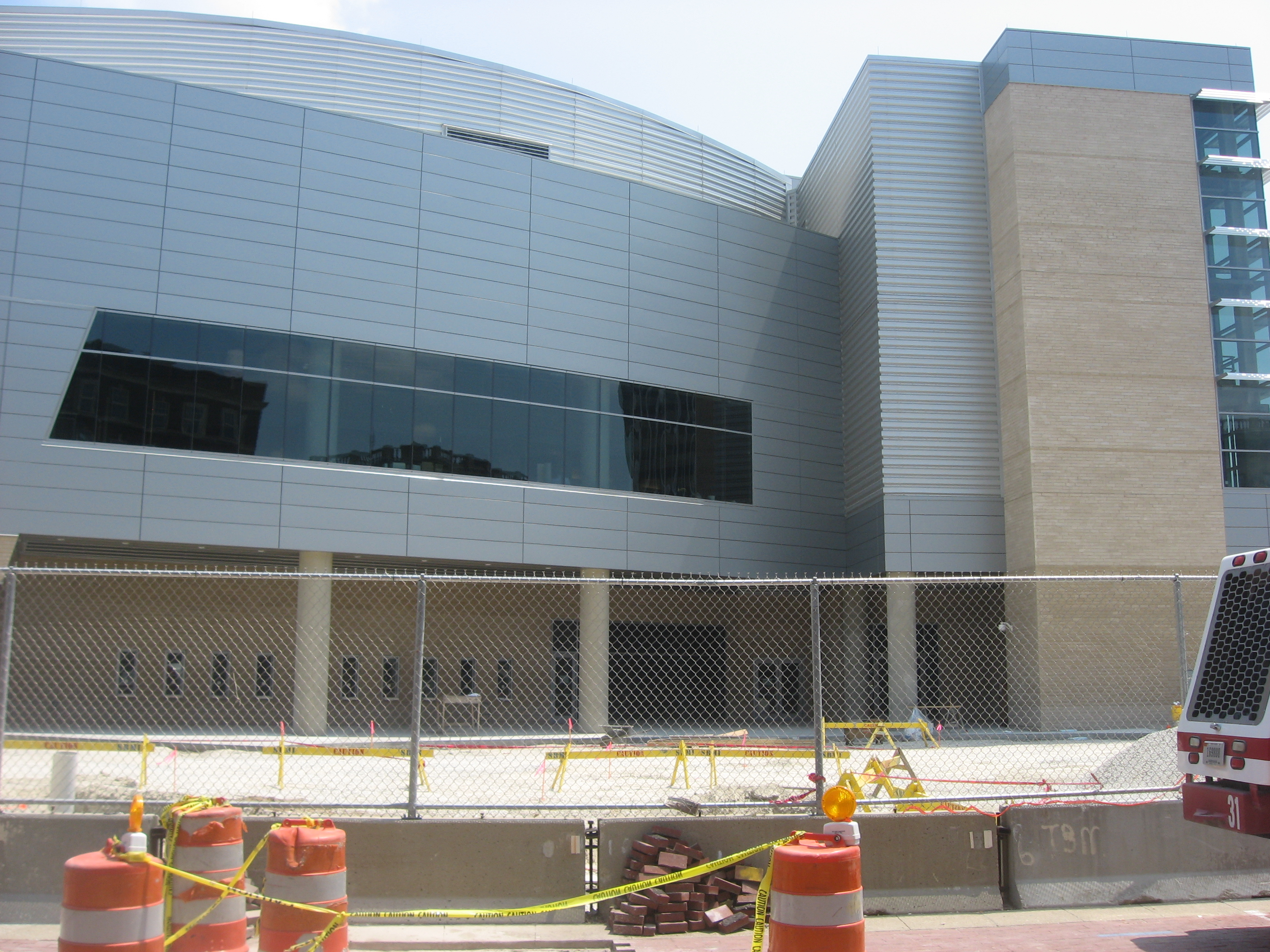
- Gemcraft–Wittmer Building site, July 2011

- Location within Indiana Location within the United States
- Location: 609 Main St., Evansville, Indiana
- Coordinates: 37°58′22″N 87°34′7″W
- Area: 0.1 acres (0.040 ha)
- Built: 1892
- Architectural style: Late Victorian
- MPS: Downtown Evansville MRA
- NRHP reference No.: 84001704
- Added to NRHP: April 6, 1984

Gemcraft–Wittmer Building, also known as Gemcraft, was a historic commercial building located in downtown Evansville, Indiana. It was built in 1892, and was a Late Victorian style building. It has been demolished.

It was listed on the National Register of Historic Places in 1984.
