= L. Puster and Company Furniture Manufactory =

- U.S. National Register of Historic Places
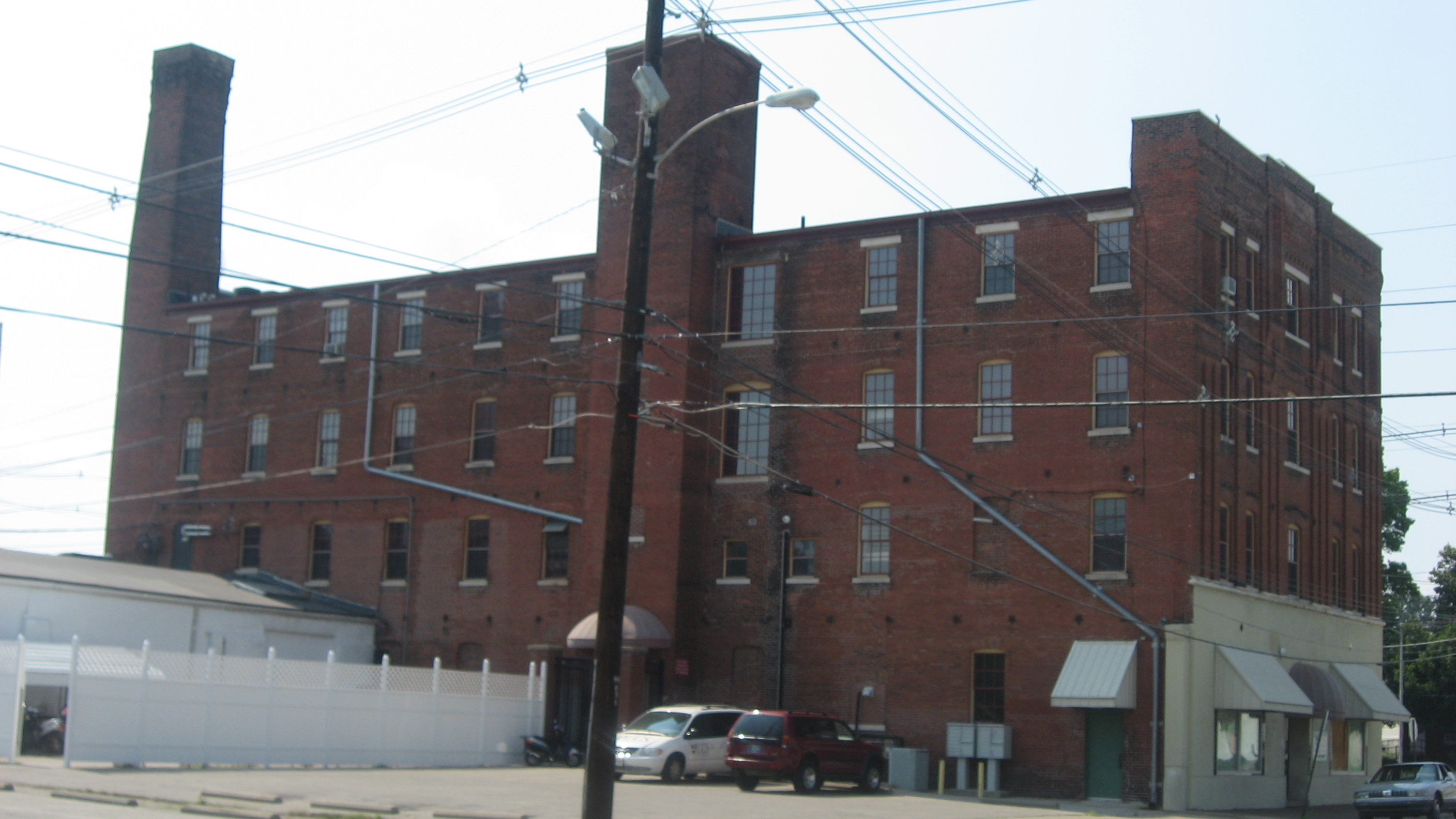
- L. Puster and Company Furniture Manufactory, July 2011

- Location within Indiana Location within the United States
- Location: 326 NW 6th St., Evansville, Indiana
- Coordinates: 37°58′33″N 87°34′18″W
- Area: less than one acre
- Built: 1887
- MPS: Downtown Evansville MRA
- NRHP reference No.: 82000118
- Added to NRHP: July 1, 1982

L. Puster and Company Furniture Manufactory is a historic furniture factory building located in downtown Evansville, Indiana. It was built in 1887, and is a four-story, brick building.

It was listed on the National Register of Historic Places in 1982.
