= Pearl Steam Laundry =

- U.S. National Register of Historic Places
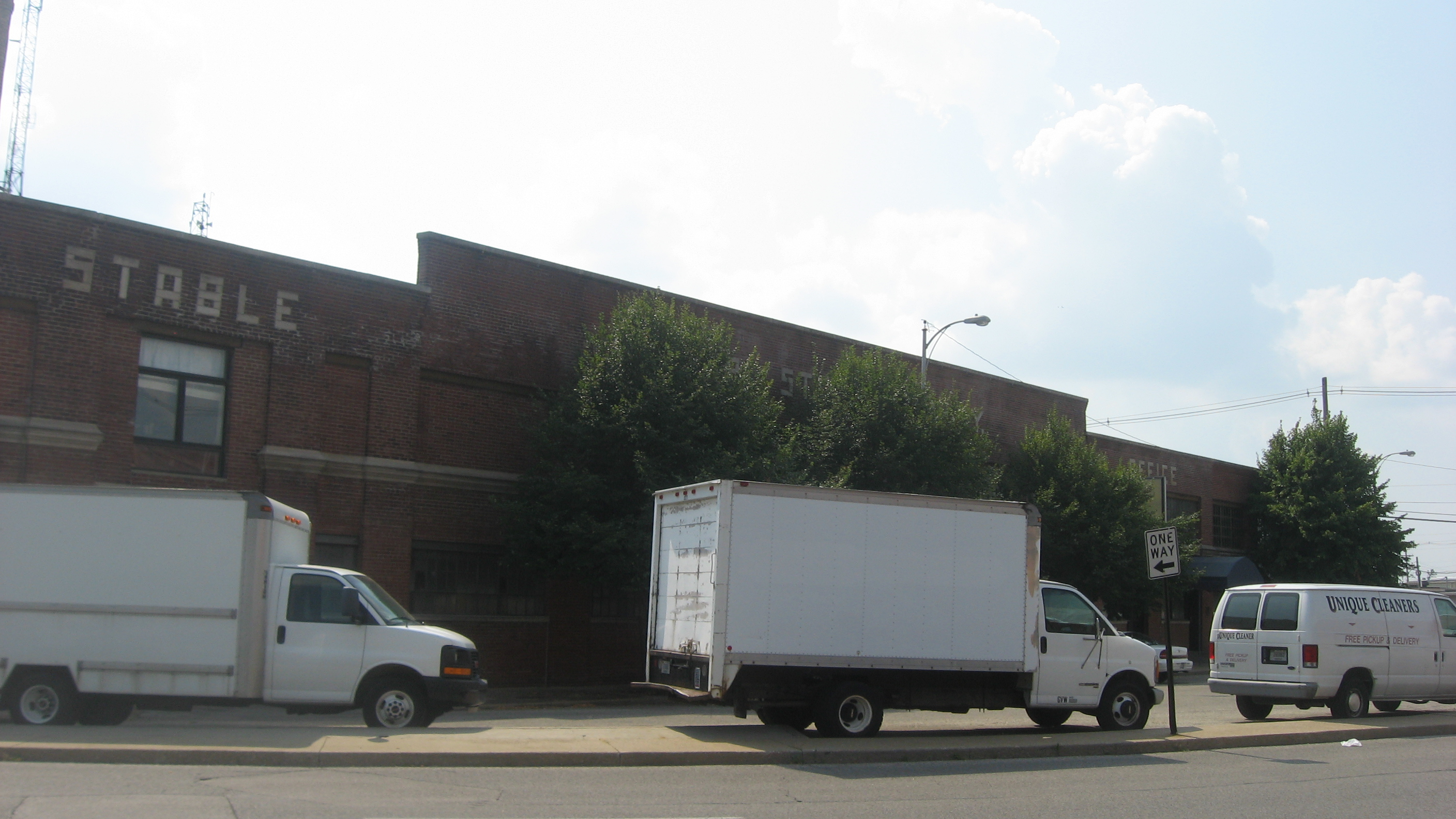
- Pearl Steam Laundry, July 2011

- Location within Indiana Location within the United States
- Location: 428 Market St., Evansville, Indiana
- Coordinates: 37°58′31″N 87°34′30″W
- Area: 0.5 acres (0.20 ha)
- Built: 1912
- Architect: Wills, James L.; Hoffman, M. J.
- MPS: Downtown Evansville MRA
- NRHP reference No.: 84001738
- Added to NRHP: April 6, 1984

Pearl Steam Laundry, also known as Pearl Laundry, was a historic laundry building located in downtown Evansville, Indiana. It was built in 1912. It was a one-story, brick building.

It was listed on the National Register of Historic Places in 1984.

The building caught fire on the early morning of May 17, 2023. It would later be demolished.
