= Harding and Miller Music Company =

- U.S. National Register of Historic Places
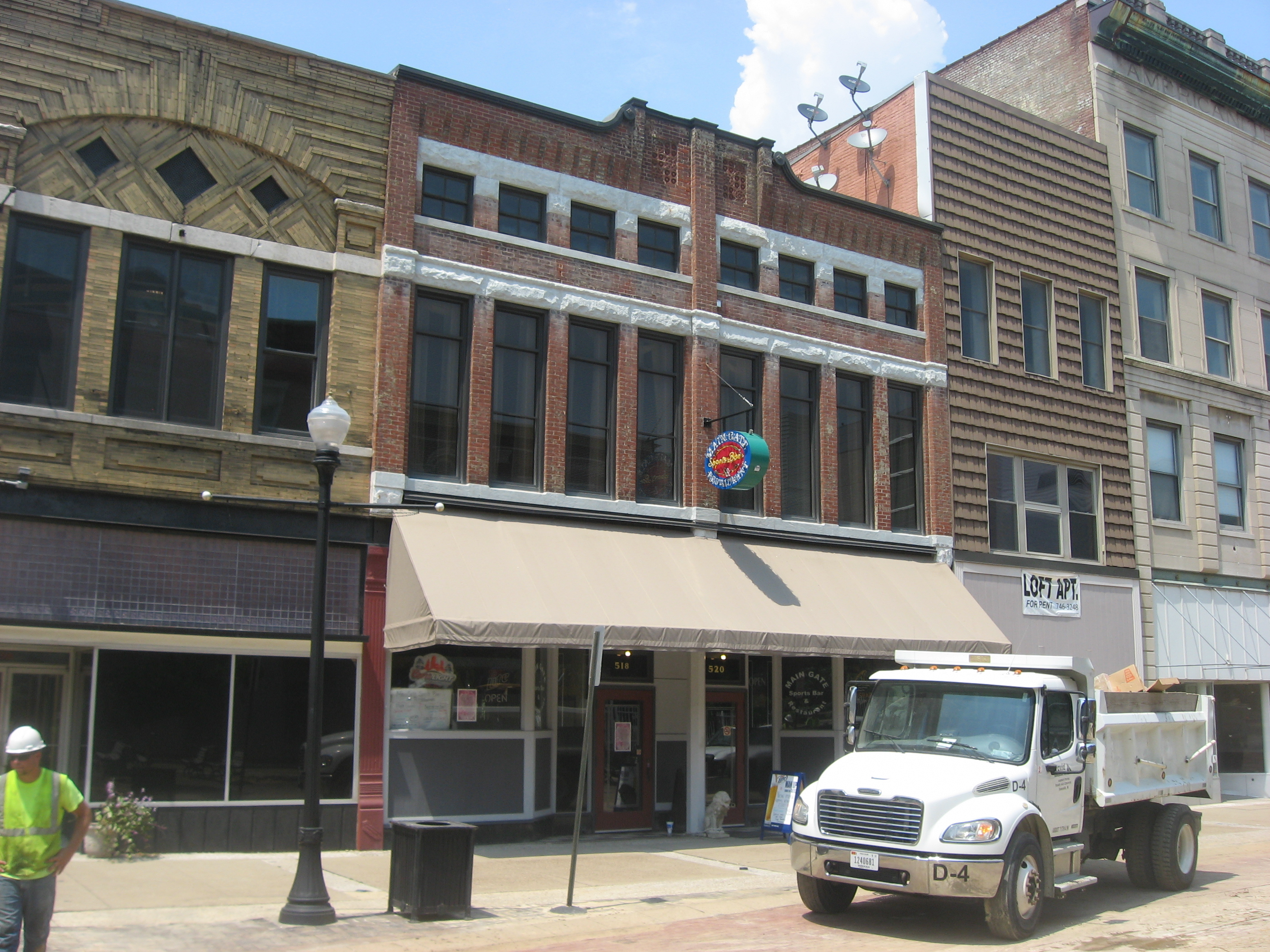
- Harding and Miller Music Company, July 2011

- Location within Indiana Location within the United States
- Location: 518-520 Main St., Evansville, Indiana
- Coordinates: 37°58′21″N 87°34′9″W
- Area: less than one acre
- Built: 1891
- Architectural style: Early Commercial
- MPS: Downtown Evansville MRA
- NRHP reference No.: 82000098
- Added to NRHP: July 1, 1982

Harding and Miller Music Company is a historic commercial building located in downtown Evansville, Indiana. It was built in 1891, and is a 2 1/2-story, style brick building with limestone detailing. It features a decorative parapet.

It was listed on the National Register of Historic Places in 1982.
