= Skora Building =

- Formerly listed on the U.S. National Register of Historic Places
- Location: 101-103 NW 2nd St., Evansville, Indiana
- Area: Less than one acre
- Built: 1911-1913
- Architect: Wills, James G.
- MPS: Downtown Evansville MRA
- NRHP reference No.: 82001855

Significant dates
- Added to NRHP: July 1, 1982
- Removed from NRHP: November 4, 2009

Skora Building, also known as the Budlock Building, was a historic commercial building located in downtown Evansville, Indiana, USA. It was built between 1911 and 1913 and was a two-story, rectangular brick building. It was demolished on January 26, 2006

It was listed on the National Register of Historic Places in 1982 and delisted in 2009.
