= Wabash Valley Motor Company =

- Formerly listed on the U.S. National Register of Historic Places
- Location within Indiana Location within the United States
- Location: 206-208 SE 8th St., Evansville, Indiana
- Coordinates: 37°58′19″N 87°33′54″W
- Area: less than one acre
- Built: 1919
- Architectural style: Chicago
- MPS: Downtown Evansville MRA
- NRHP reference No.: 82000126

Significant dates
- Added to NRHP: July 1, 1982
- Removed from NRHP: June 8, 2011

Wabash Valley Motor Company was a historic commercial building located in downtown Evansville, Indiana. It was built in 1919. It was in Chicago school style architecture. It has been demolished.

It was listed on the National Register of Historic Places in 1982 and delisted in 2011.
