= Parson and Scoville Building =

- U.S. National Register of Historic Places
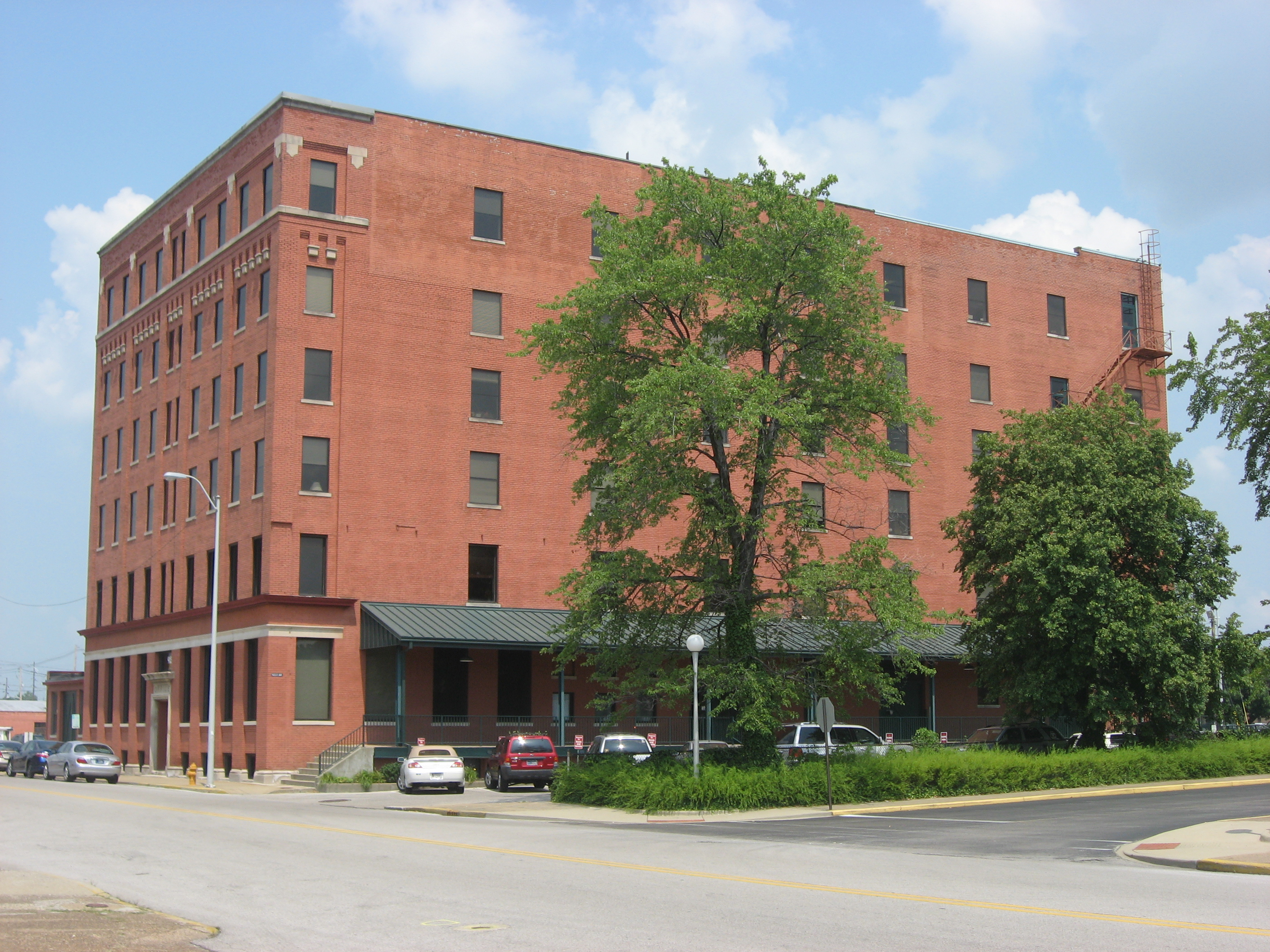
- Parson and Scoville Building, July 2011

- Location within Indiana Location within the United States
- Location: 915 Main St., Evansville, Indiana
- Coordinates: 37°58′30″N 87°33′53″W
- Area: less than one acre
- Built: 1908
- MPS: Downtown Evansville MRA
- NRHP reference No.: 82000117
- Added to NRHP: July 1, 1982

Parson and Scoville Building, also known as the Pasco Building, is a historic commercial building located in downtown Evansville, Indiana. It was built in 1908, and is a six-story, brick building. The building was originally built to house the warehouse of a wholesale grocery.

It was listed on the National Register of Historic Places in 1982.
