= Charles Leich and Company =

- U.S. National Register of Historic Places
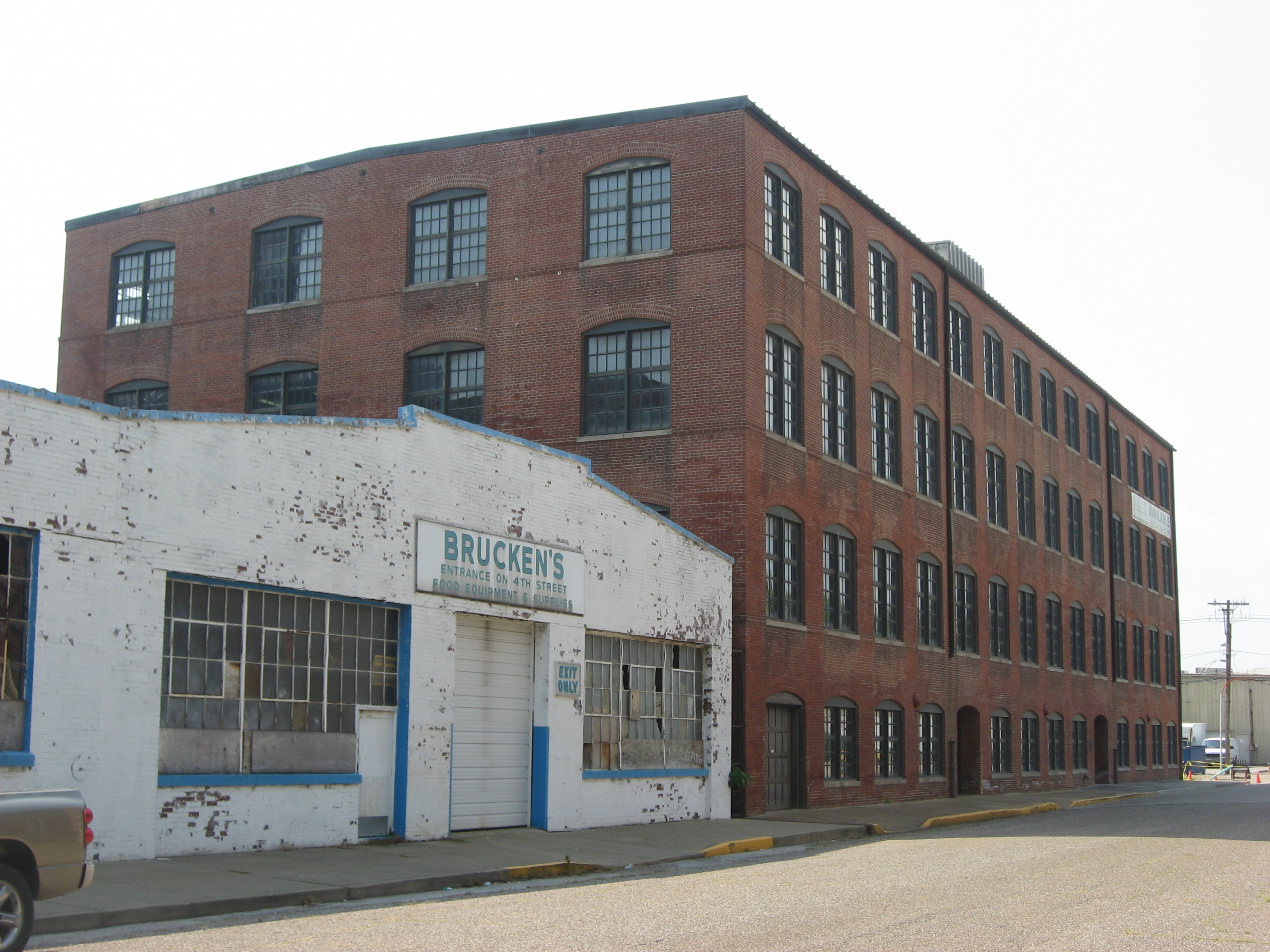
- Charles Leich and Company, July 2011

- Location within Indiana Location within the United States
- Location: 420 NW 5th St., Evansville, Indiana
- Coordinates: 37°58′34″N 87°34′25″W
- Area: less than one acre
- Built: 1898
- MPS: Downtown Evansville MRA
- NRHP reference No.: 82000106
- Added to NRHP: July 1, 1982

Charles Leich and Company is a historic factory building located in downtown Evansville, Indiana. It was built in 1887, and is a four-story, brick building. The building was originally built for the Evansville Woolen Mill, and Charles Leich and Company acquired it in 1914.

It was listed on the National Register of Historic Places in 1982.
