= Mead Johnson River-Rail-Truck Terminal and Warehouse =

- U.S. National Register of Historic Places
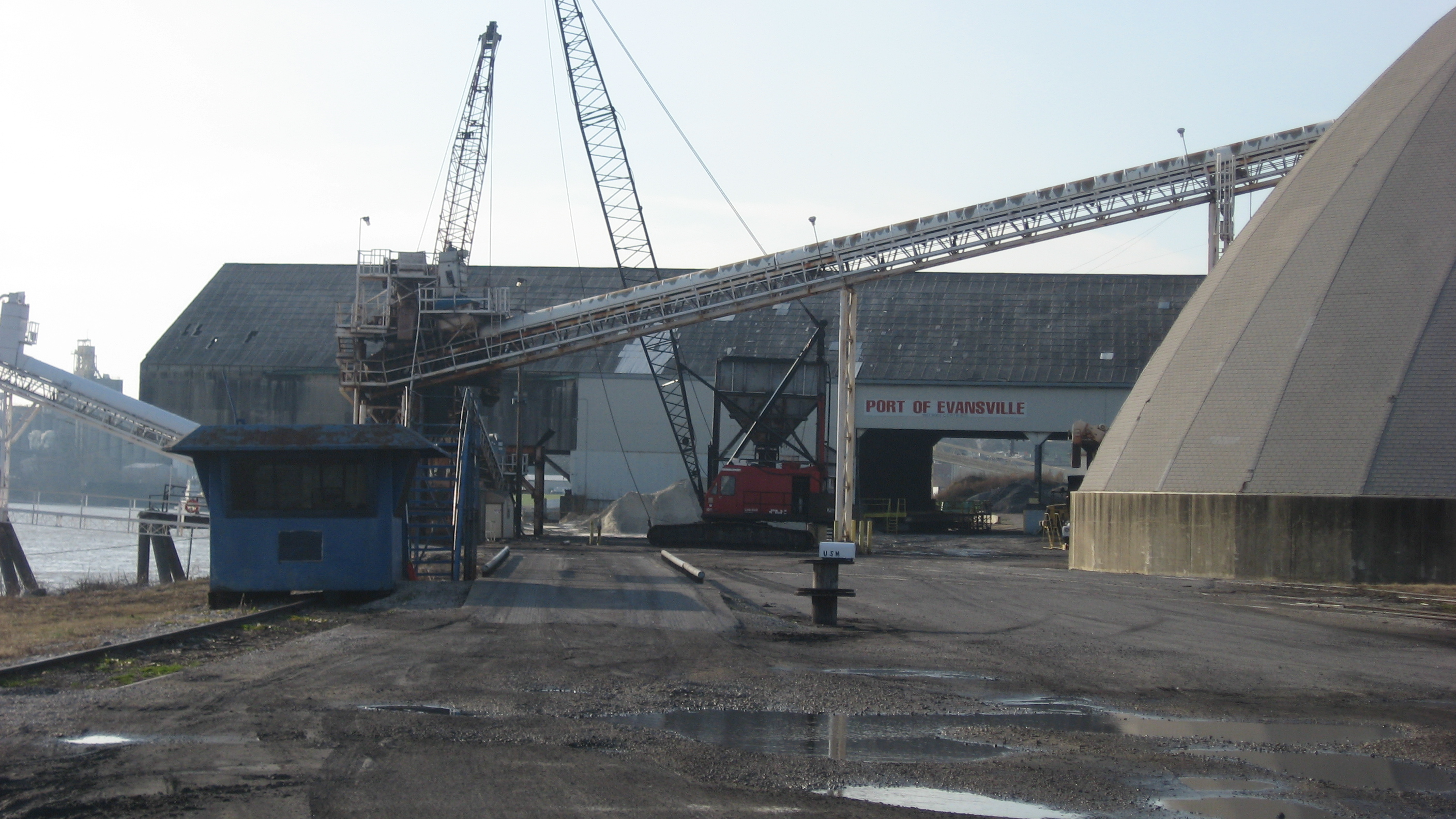
- Side view of the terminal

- Location within Indiana Location within the United States
- Location: 1830 W. Ohio St., Evansville, Indiana
- Coordinates: 37°58′35″N 87°35′31″W
- Area: 6.5 acres (2.6 ha)
- Built: 1931, 1957
- Built by: M.J. Hoffman Construction Co.
- Architect: Fowler, Frank; Seegmueller, Gus
- NRHP reference No.: 84000495
- Added to NRHP: December 27, 1984

The Mead Johnson River-Rail-Truck Terminal and Warehouse is a historic terminal / warehouse at the Port of Evansville in Evansville, Indiana. The complex was built in 1931 and consists of the terminal building and warehouse. The terminal building is a rectangular canopied structure measuring 285 feet long, 110 feet wide, and 62 feet high. The building is cantilevered 45 feet over the Ohio River. The terminal is serviced by two electric cranes that each measure 54 feet long. The original warehouse is 585 feet long and 150 feet wide. It was enlarged by a 310-foot addition in 1957. The terminal is operated by Kinder Morgan and is served by CSX Transportation.

It was added to the National Register of Historic Places in 1984.

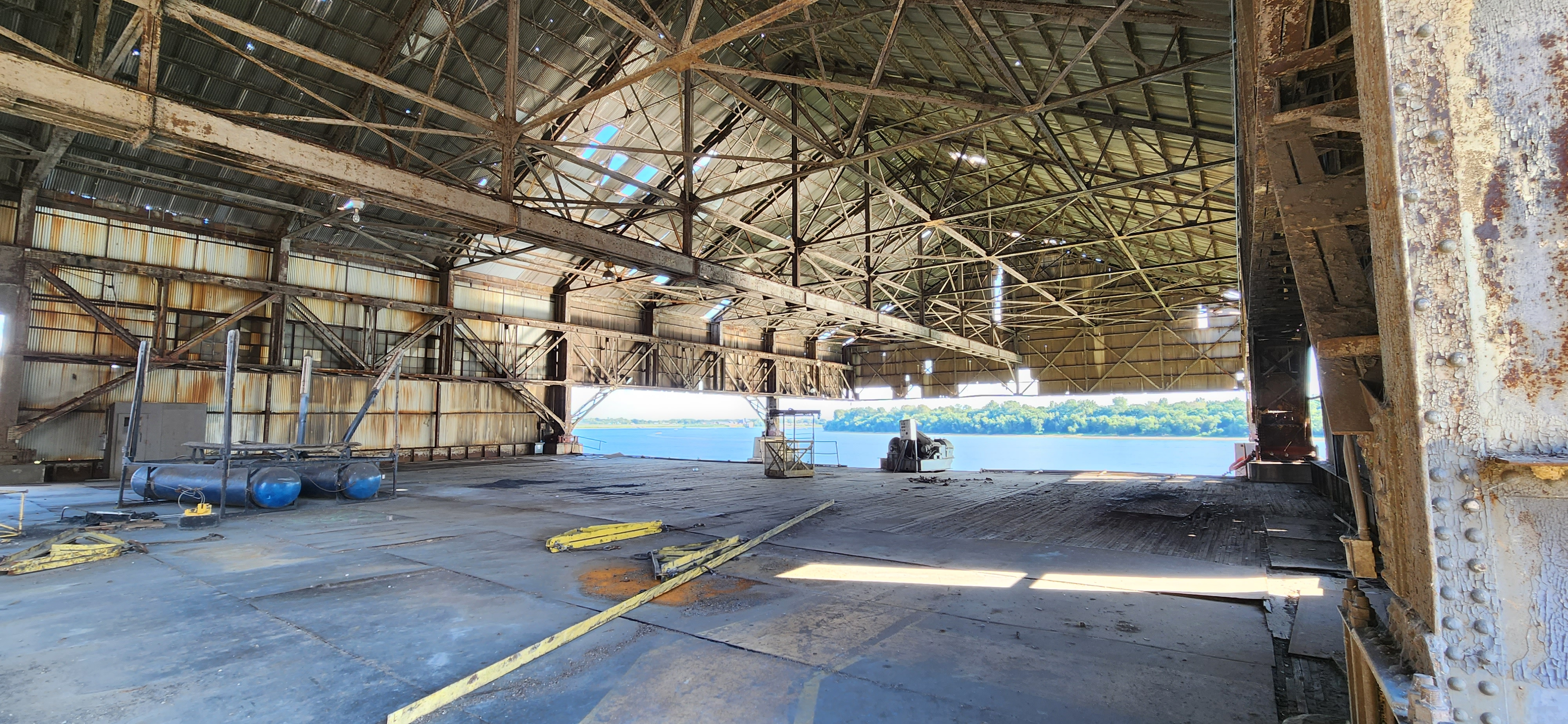
Another inside view of the abandoned terminal

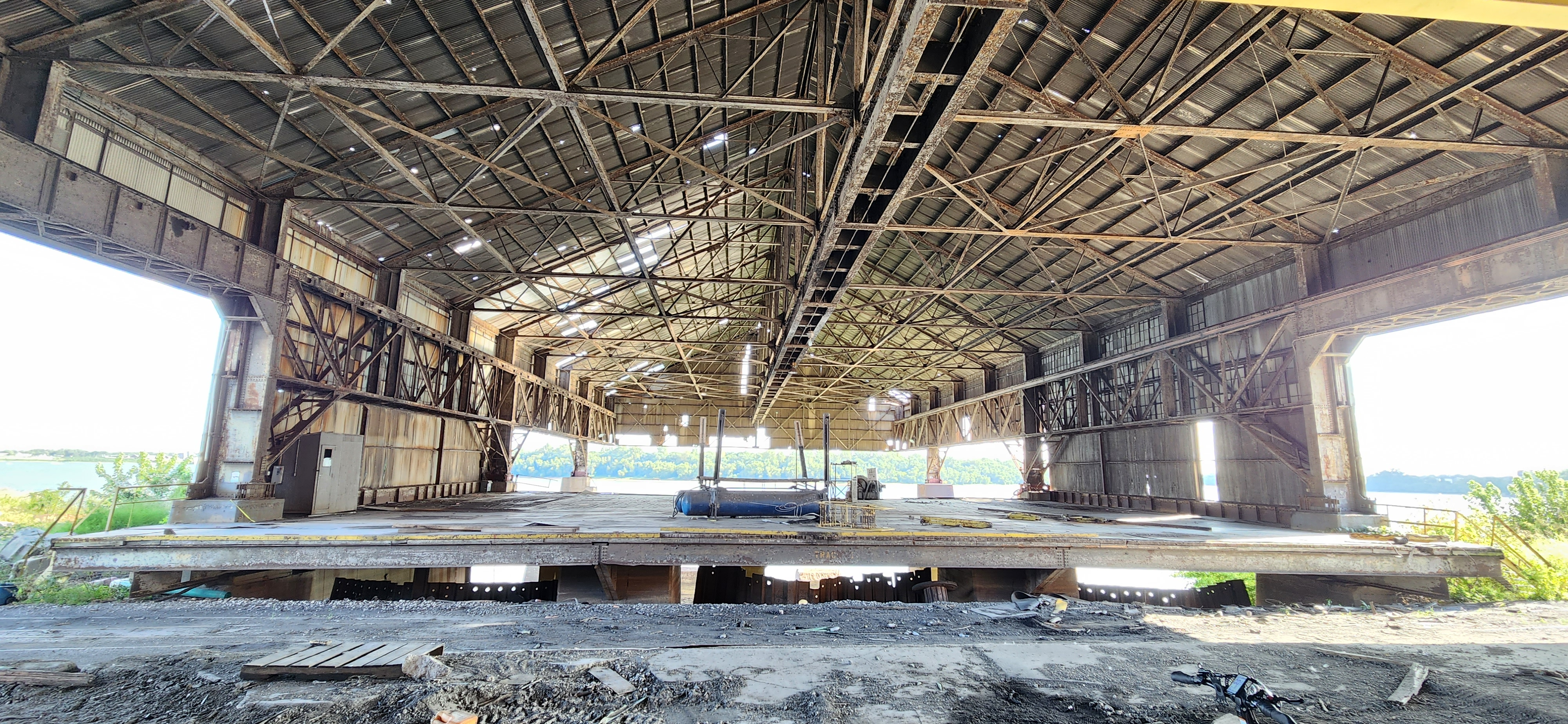
Inside view of the abandoned terminal

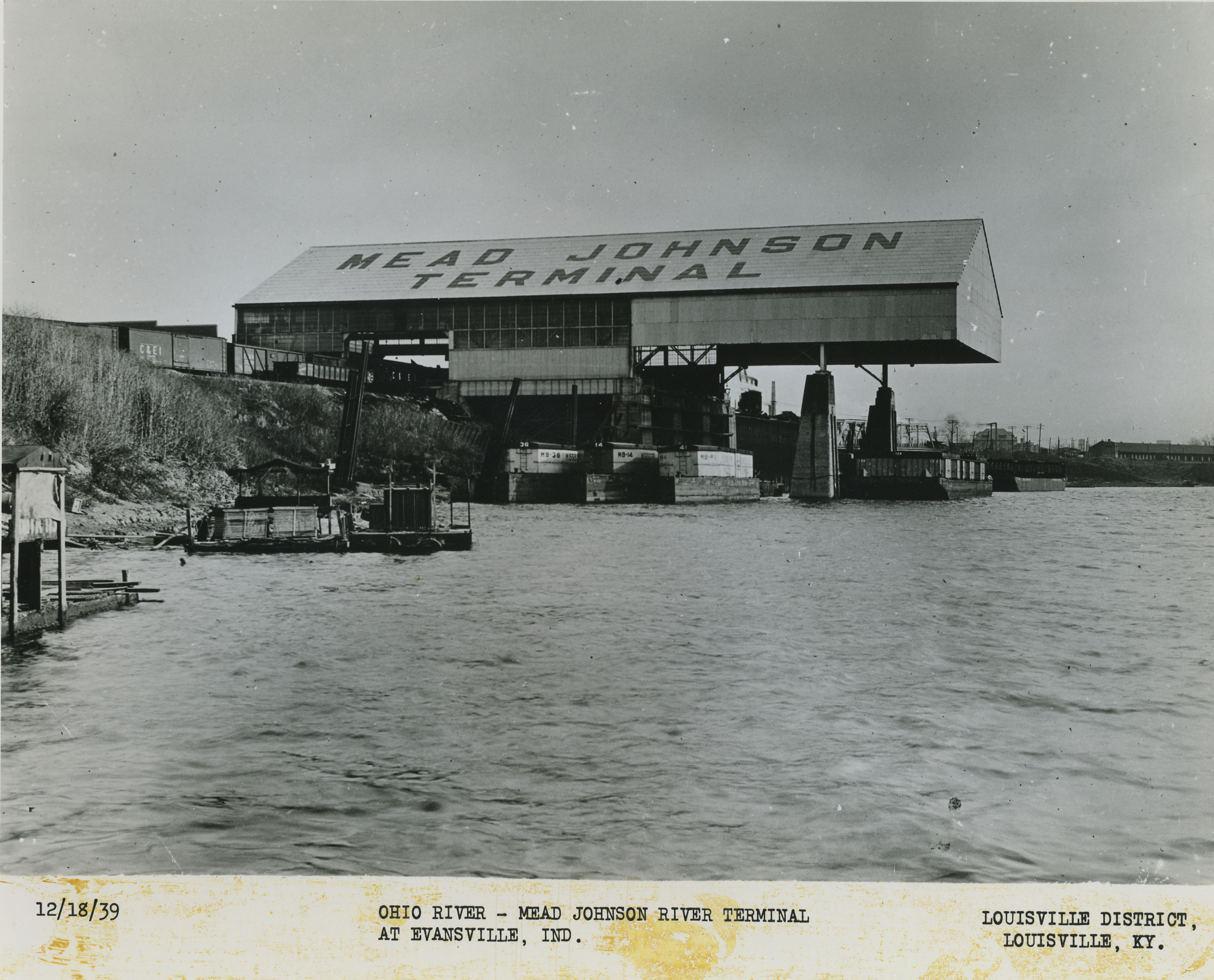
Mead Johnson River Terminal at Evansville, Indiana, 18 December 1939

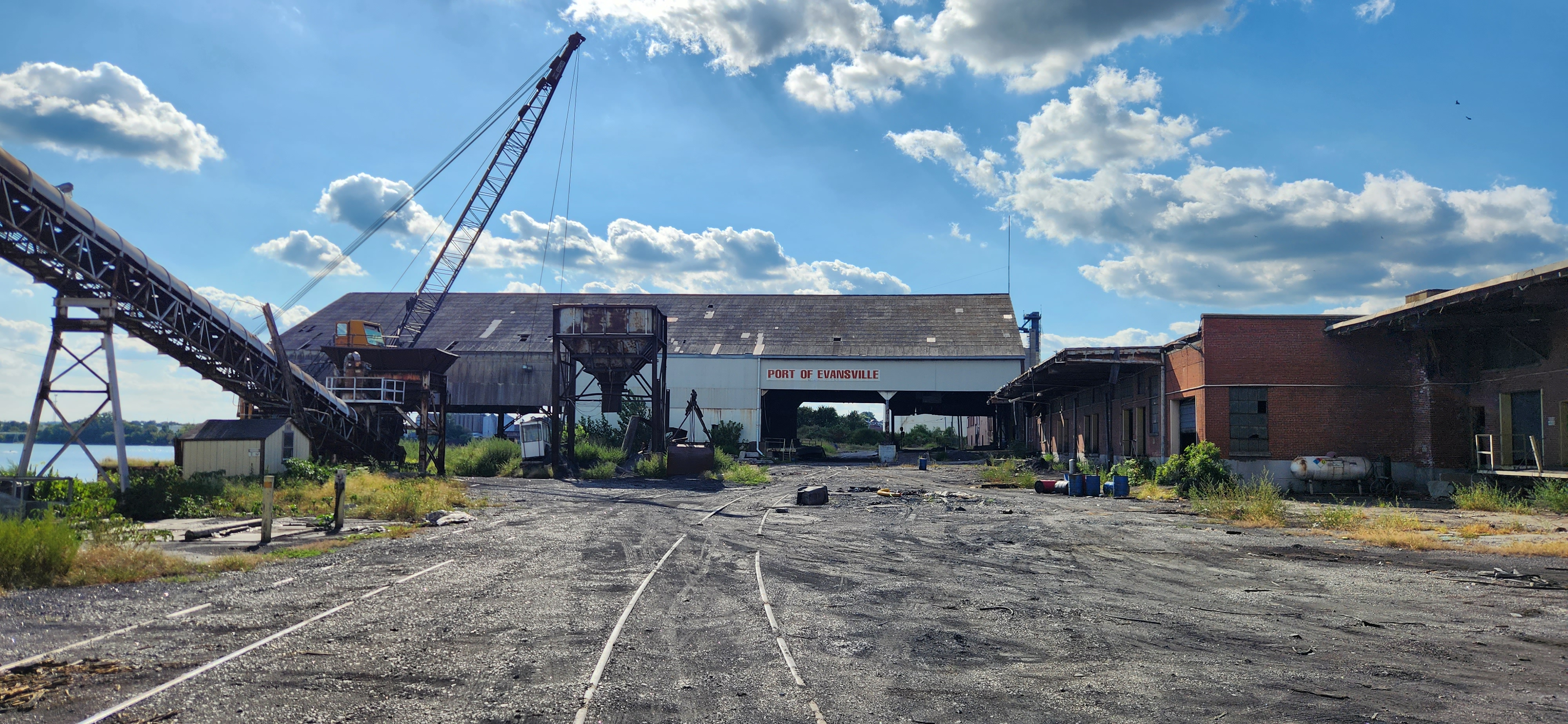
The abandoned terminal in September 2023
