= William Bedford Sr. House =

Historic house in Indiana, United States

- U.S. National Register of Historic Places
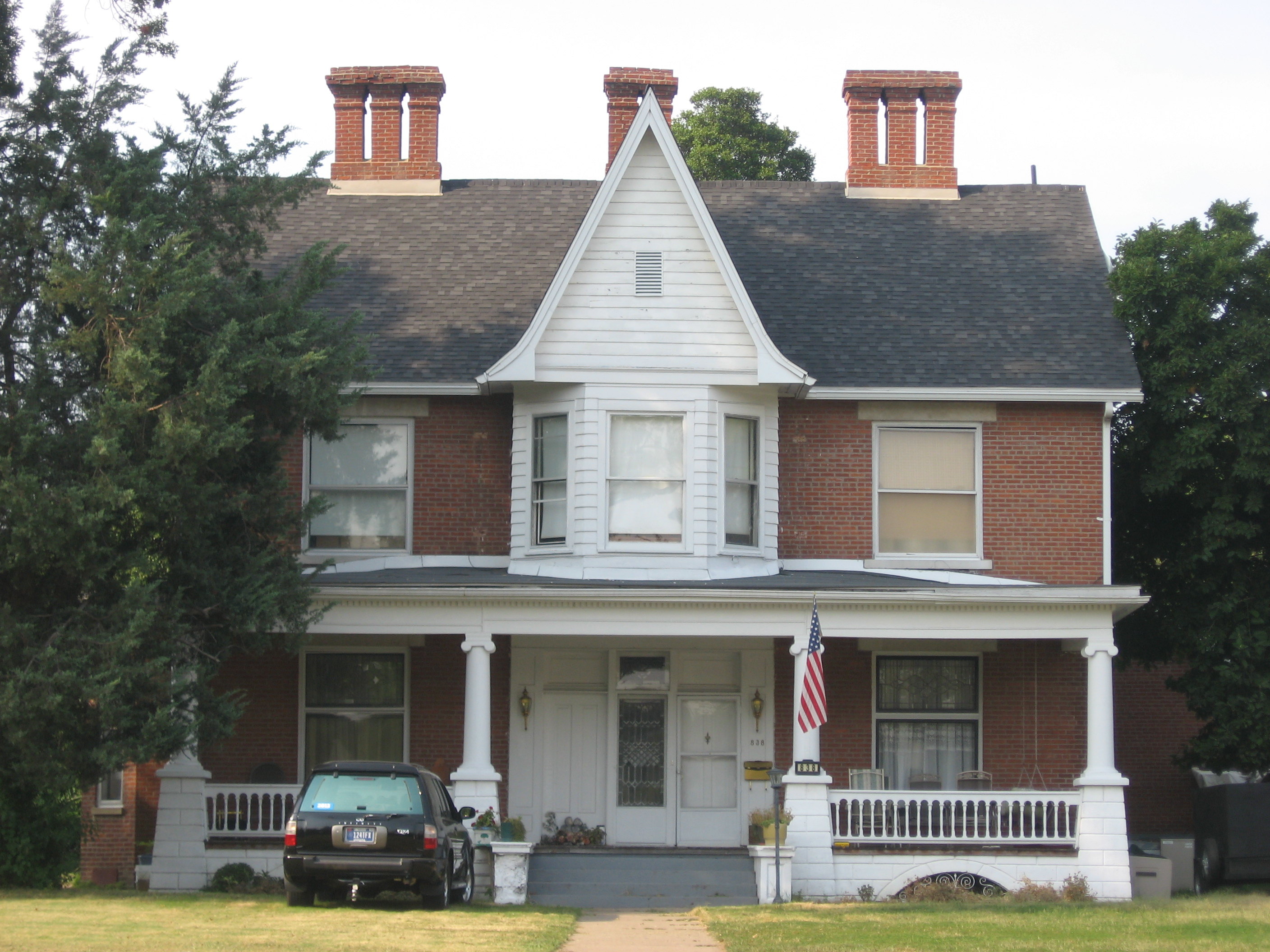
- William Bedford Sr. House, September 2011

- Location within Indiana Location within the United States
- Location: 838 Washington Ave., Evansville, Indiana
- Coordinates: 37°57′49″N 87°33′3″W
- Area: 0.6 acres (0.24 ha)
- Built: 1873
- Built by: Bedford, William Sr.
- Architectural style: English influence
- NRHP reference No.: 78000056
- Added to NRHP: November 28, 1978

William Bedford Sr. House is a historic home located at Evansville, Indiana. It was built in 1873, and is a two-story brick dwelling with English influences. It features projecting polygonal bays and a one-story, full-width front porch on four piers.

It was added to the National Register of Historic Places in 1978.
