= Edgar A. Igleheart House =

Historic house in Indiana, United States

- U.S. National Register of Historic Places
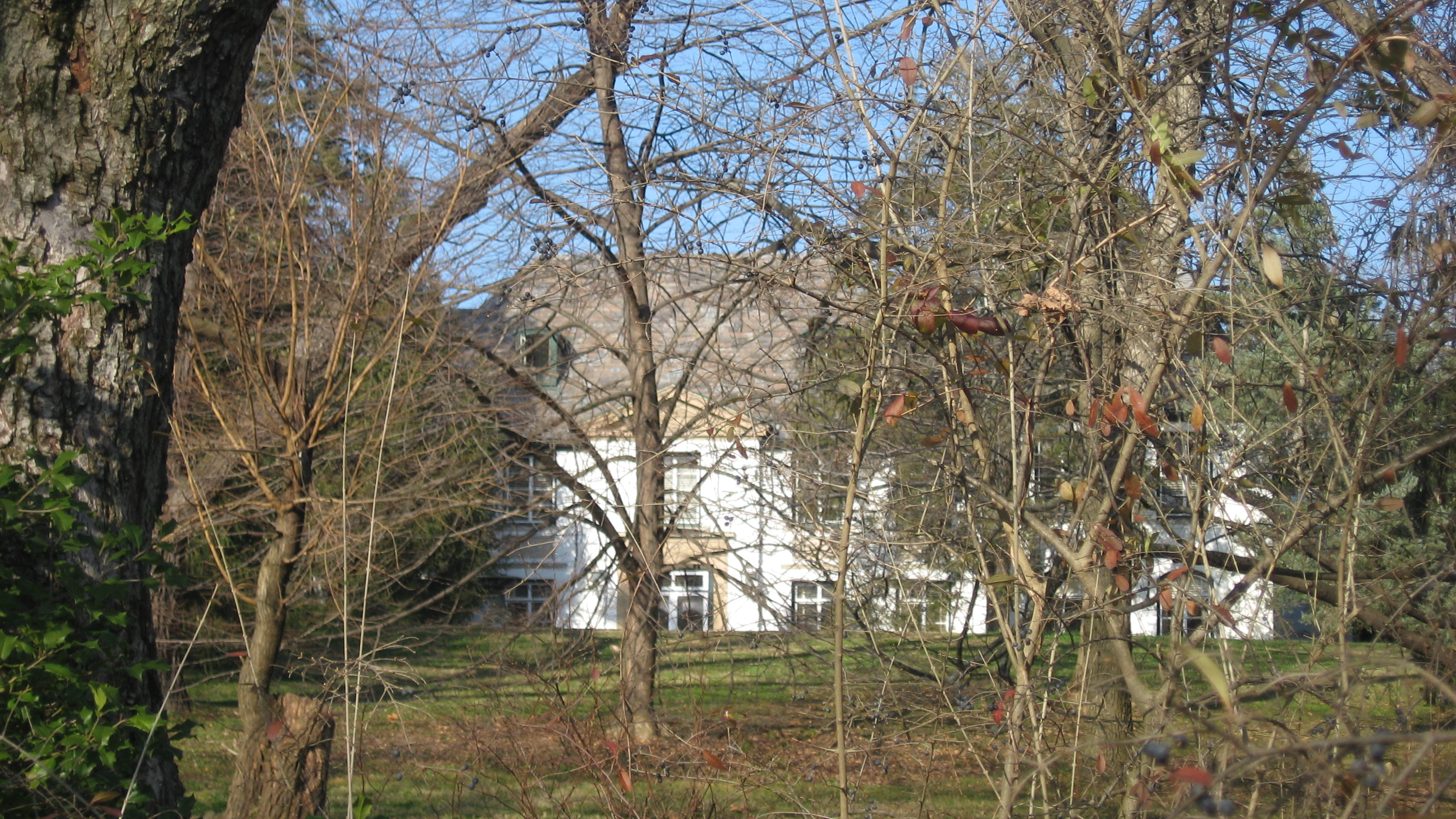
- Edgar A. Igleheart House, December 2011

- Location within Indiana Location within the United States
- Location: 5500 Lincoln Ave., Evansville, Indiana
- Coordinates: 37°58′13″N 87°29′01″W
- Area: 15 acres (6.1 ha)
- Built: 1932
- Architect: Thole, Edward Joseph, Sr.
- Architectural style: Late 19th And 20th Century Revivals, French Renaissance
- NRHP reference No.: 90001930
- Added to NRHP: December 18, 1990

Edgar A. Igelheart House is a historic home located at Evansville, Indiana. It was designed by Edward Joseph Thole and built in 1932. It is a French Renaissance château style painted brick dwelling consisting of a rectangular central section with flanking wings. It has a slate hipped roof. Also on the property are the contributing two sections of the Lant House, stable, garage (c. 1932), and cow barn.

It was added to the National Register of Historic Places in 1990.
