= Damron Nienaber Commercial Block =

- Formerly listed on the U.S. National Register of Historic Places
- Location: 325 SE 8th St., Evansville, Indiana
- Area: less than one acre
- Built: 1884
- Architect: Nienaber, Joseph
- MPS: Downtown Evansville MRA
- NRHP reference No.: 82000114

Significant dates
- Added to NRHP: July 1, 1982
- Removed from NRHP: February 1, 1989

Damron Nienaber Commercial Block was a historic commercial building located in downtown Evansville, Indiana. It was built in 1884. It has been demolished.

It was listed on the National Register of Historic Places in 1982 and delisted in 1989.
