= Orr Iron Company =

- U.S. National Register of Historic Places
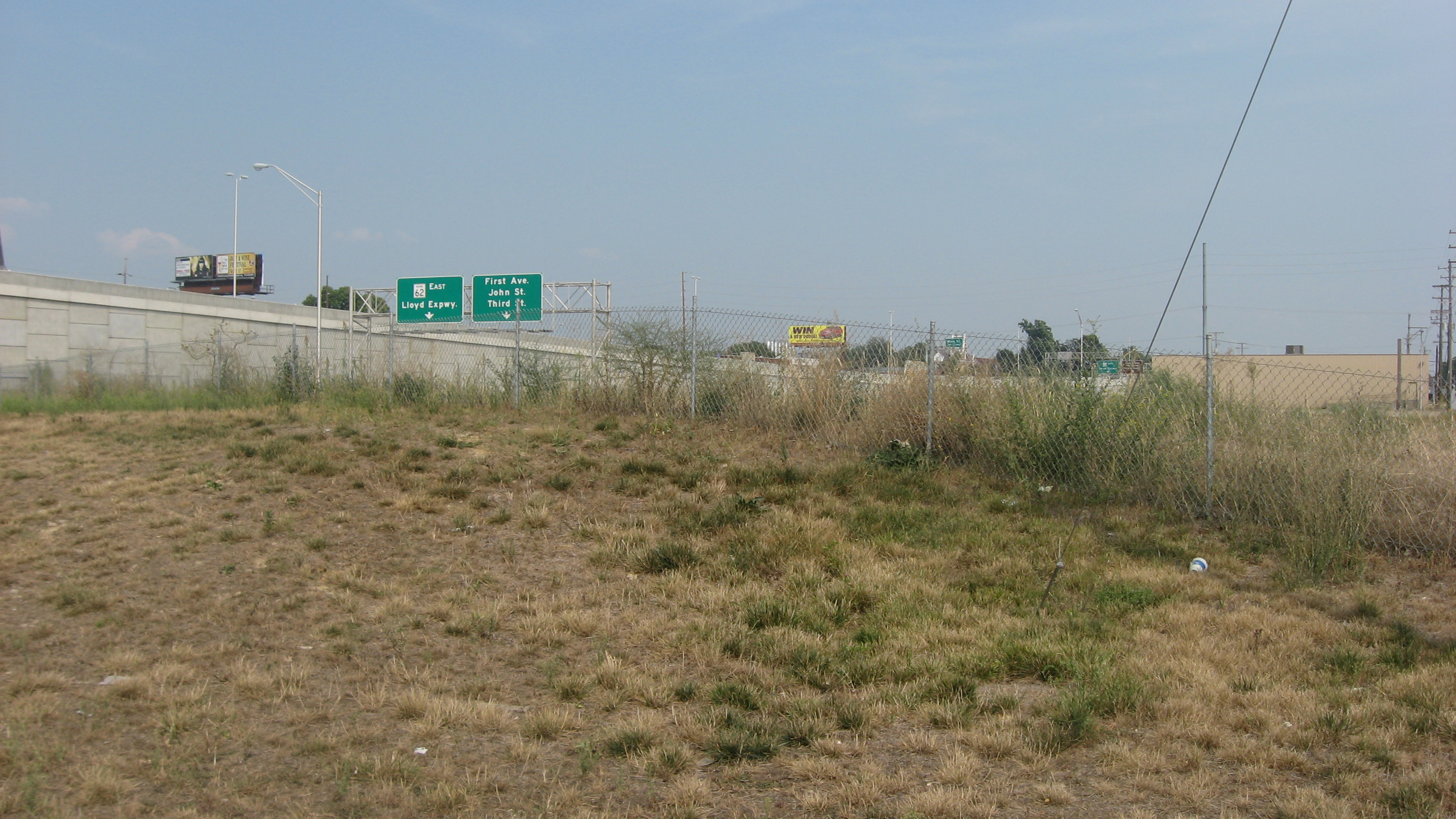
- Orr Iron Company site, September 2011

- Location within Indiana Location within the United States
- Location: 1100 Pennsylvania St., Evansville, Indiana
- Coordinates: 37°58′40″N 87°34′50″W
- Area: less than one acre
- Built: 1912
- Architect: Boyle, Harry E., & Company
- Architectural style: Industrial
- Demolished: 2008
- MPS: Downtown Evansville MRA
- NRHP reference No.: 82000116
- Added to NRHP: July 1, 1982

Orr Iron Company, also known as Shelby Steel-Orr Iron, was a historic building in downtown Evansville, Indiana. It was built in 1912. It was demolished in 2008.

It was listed on the National Register of Historic Places in 1982.
