= St. John's United Church of Christ (Evansville, Indiana) =

Historic church in Indiana, United States

- St. John's Evangelical Protestant Church
- U.S. National Register of Historic Places
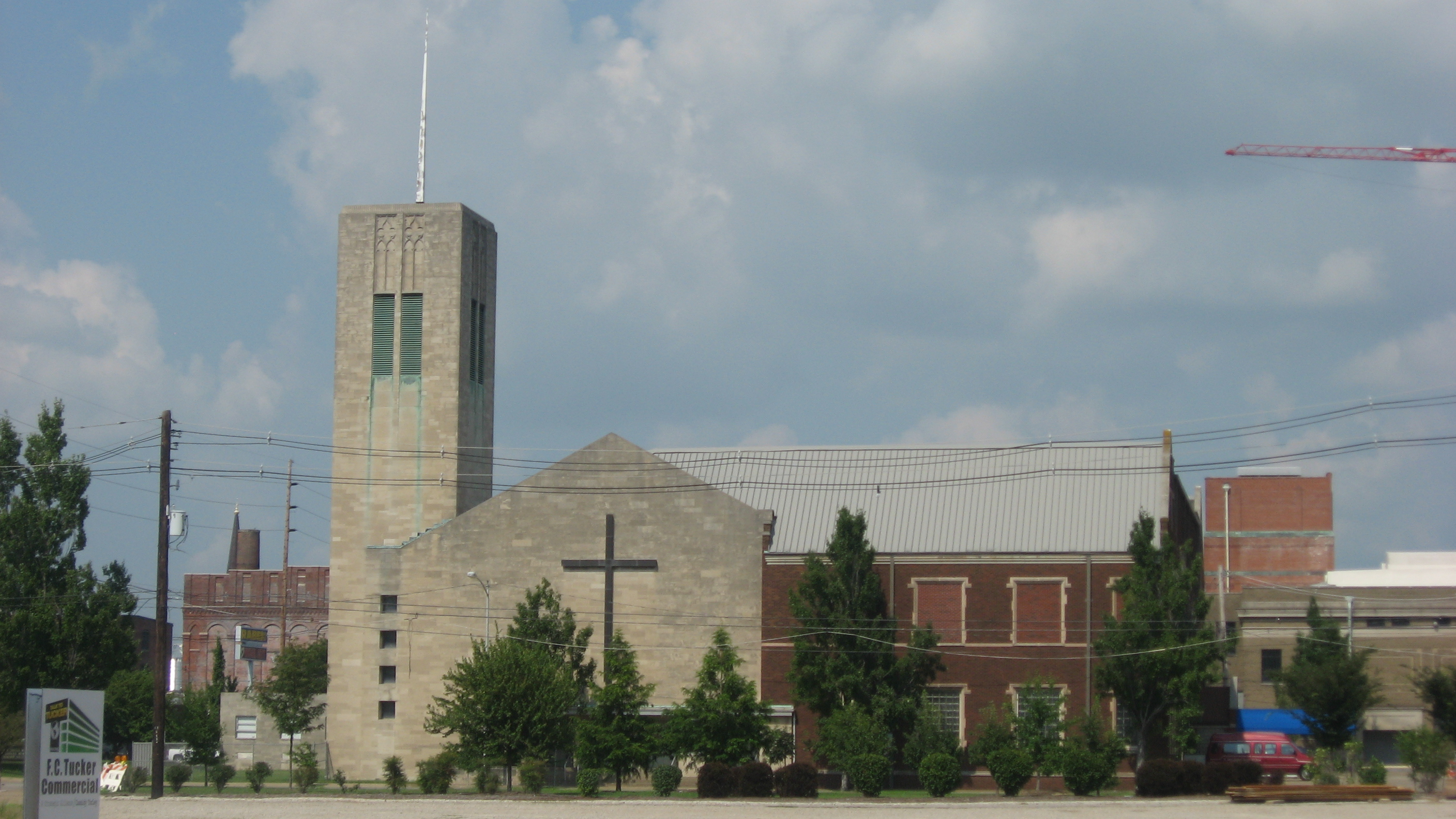
- St. John's United Church of Christ, July 2011

- Location within Indiana Location within the United States
- Location: 314 Market St., Evansville, Indiana
- Coordinates: 37°58′28″N 87°34′28″W
- Area: less than one acre
- Built: 1921
- Architect: Capelle & Troutman
- Architectural style: Tudor Revival, Jacobethan Revival
- MPS: Downtown Evansville MRA
- NRHP reference No.: 82000123
- Added to NRHP: July 1, 1982

St. John's United Church of Christ, originally known as St. John's Evangelical Protestant Church, is a historic United Church of Christ church located in downtown Evansville, Indiana. St. John's Parish Hall was built in 1921, and is a Tudor Revival style brick building.

It was listed on the National Register of Historic Places in 1982.
