= Robert Smith Mortuary =

- U.S. National Register of Historic Places
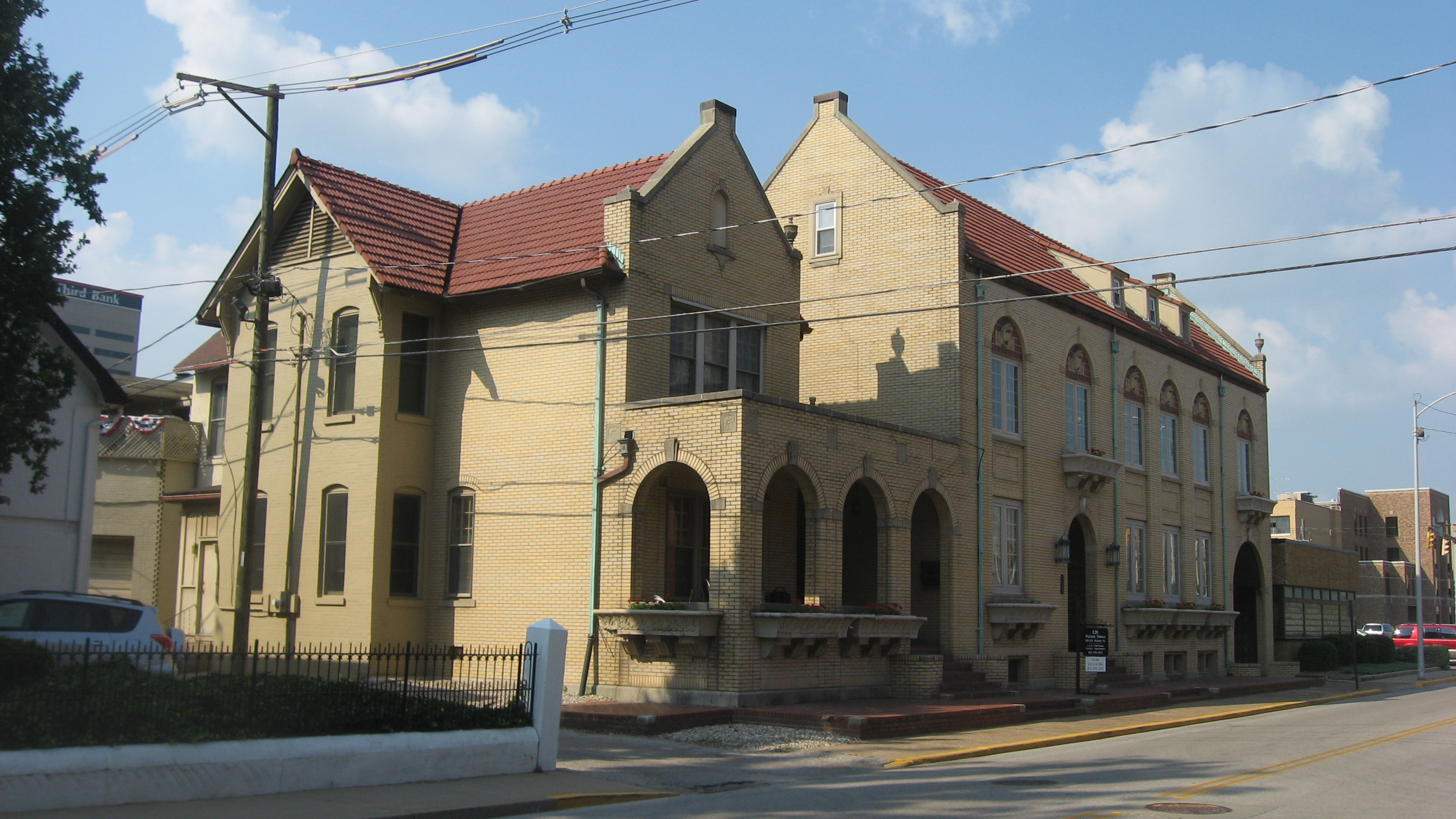
- Robert Smith Mortuary, July 2011

- Location within Indiana Location within the United States
- Location: 118-120 Walnut St., Evansville, Indiana
- Coordinates: 37°58′8″N 87°34′20″W
- Area: less than one acre
- Built: 1930
- Architect: Anderson, Fritz
- Architectural style: Mission/spanish Revival
- NRHP reference No.: 80000072
- Added to NRHP: September 22, 1980

Robert Smith Mortuary, also known as the Greek-Shears Mortuary, is a historic mortuary building located in downtown Evansville, Indiana. It was built in 1930, and is a 2 1/2-story, rectangular Mission Revival style brick building. It features arcaded windows, an esplanade, and steeply pitched red tile roof. It is connected to a 2 1/2-story brick former dwelling constructed about 1890 and remodeled in 1930 to complement the new building.

It was added to the National Register of Historic Places in 1980.
