= Evansville Journal News =

- U.S. National Register of Historic Places
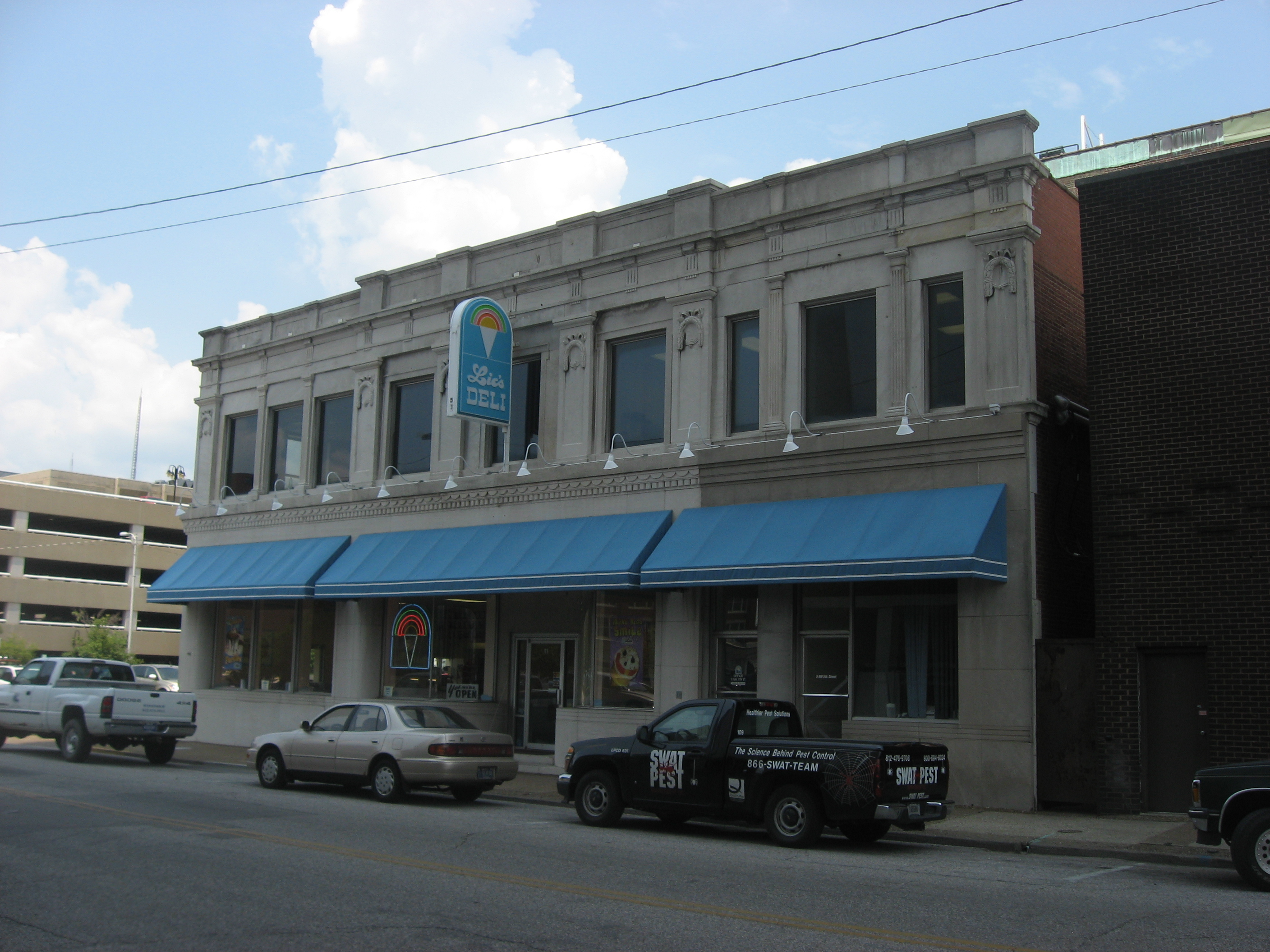
- Evansville Journal News Building, July 2011

- Location within Indiana Location within the United States
- Location: 7-11 NW 5th St., Evansville, Indiana
- Coordinates: 37°58′22″N 87°34′13″W
- Area: less than one acre
- Built: 1910
- Architect: Gilbert, F. Mason
- Architectural style: Beaux Arts
- MPS: Downtown Evansville MRA
- NRHP reference No.: 82000092
- Added to NRHP: July 1, 1982

Evansville Journal News, also known as the Citizens Bank Building-Evansville Journal Building, is a historic commercial building located in downtown Evansville, Indiana. It was built in 1910, and is a two-story, Beaux-Arts style brick building with a limestone front. The building was originally built to house a newspaper.

It was listed on the National Register of Historic Places in 1982.
