= H.G. Newman Building =

- U.S. National Register of Historic Places
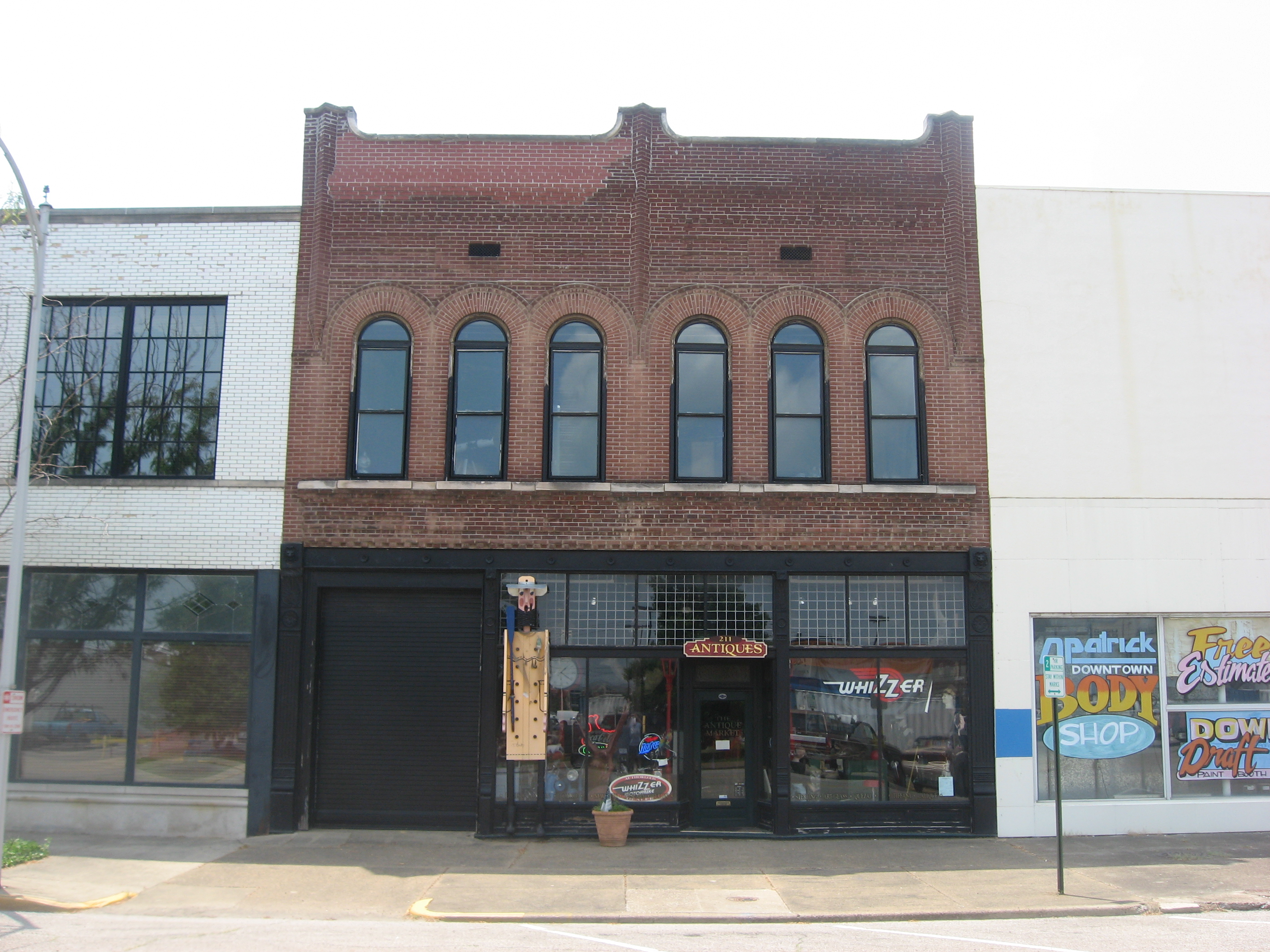
- H.G. Newman Building, July 2011

- Location within Indiana Location within the United States
- Location: 211-213 SE 4th St., Evansville, Indiana
- Coordinates: 37°58′11″N 87°34′10″W
- Area: less than one acre
- Built: 1900
- Architectural style: Late Victorian
- MPS: Downtown Evansville MRA
- NRHP reference No.: 82000113
- Added to NRHP: July 1, 1982

The H.G. Newman Building is a historic commercial building located in downtown Evansville, Indiana. It was built in 1900, and is a two-story, Late Victorian style brick building. The building features decorative brickwork and parapet, and round arched openings. It was originally built to house a wholesale grocery and farmers' supply.

It was listed on the National Register of Historic Places in 1982.
