= Patrick Henry Richardt House =

Historic house in Indiana, United States

- Formerly listed on the U.S. National Register of Historic Places
- Location: 213 N.W. Fifth St., Evansville, Indiana
- Area: less than one acre
- Built: 1861
- MPS: Downtown Evansville MRA
- NRHP reference No.: 82000119

Significant dates
- Added to NRHP: July 1, 1982
- Removed from NRHP: July 16, 1986

Patrick Henry Richardt House was a historic home located in downtown Evansville, Indiana. It was built in 1861. It has been demolished.

It was listed on the National Register of Historic Places in 1982 and delisted in 1991.
