= Sunset Park Pavilion =

- U.S. National Register of Historic Places
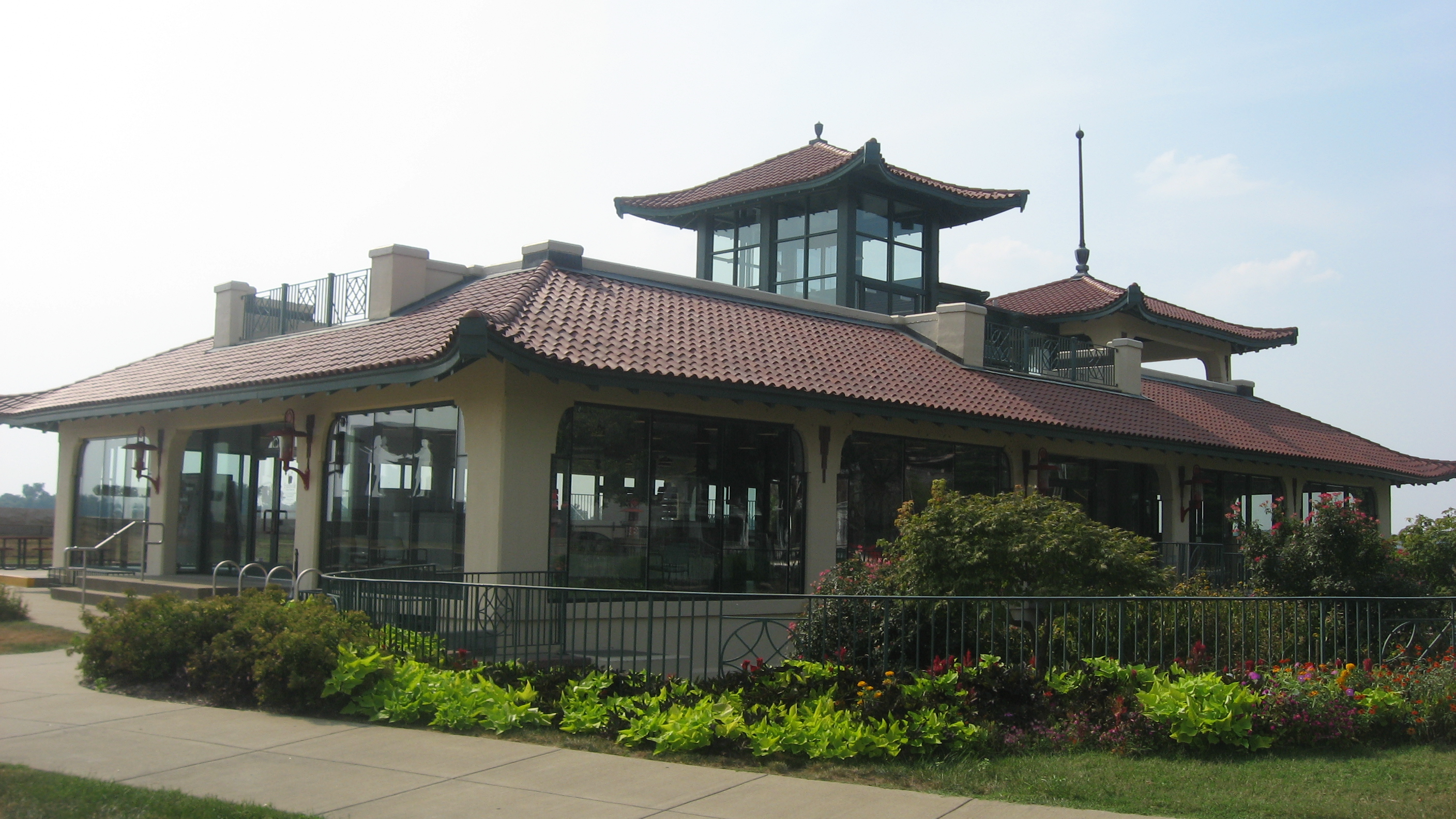
- Sunset Park Pavilion, September 2011

- Location within Indiana Location within the United States
- Location: 411 SE. Riverside Dr., Sunset Park, Evansville, Indiana
- Coordinates: 37°57′57″N 87°34′26″W
- Area: 0.1 acres (0.040 ha)
- Built: 1912
- Architect: Boyle, Harry E.; Kleiderer, Charles F., & Co.
- Architectural style: Bungalow/craftsman
- NRHP reference No.: 92000673
- Added to NRHP: June 17, 1992

Sunset Park Pavilion, also known as the Sunset Park Shelter House/Pagoda, is a historic park pavilion located at Evansville, Indiana. It was built in 1912, and is a one-story shelter house in the form of a Japanese pagoda. It is constructed of reinforced concrete and is topped by a red tile roof that is characteristically upturned at the corners. It was originally an open air facility, but has been enclosed. It was restored in 1993 and now houses the Evansville convention and visitors bureau.

It was added to the National Register of Historic Places in 1992.
