= 223 Main Street =

- Building at 223 Main Street
- U.S. National Register of Historic Places
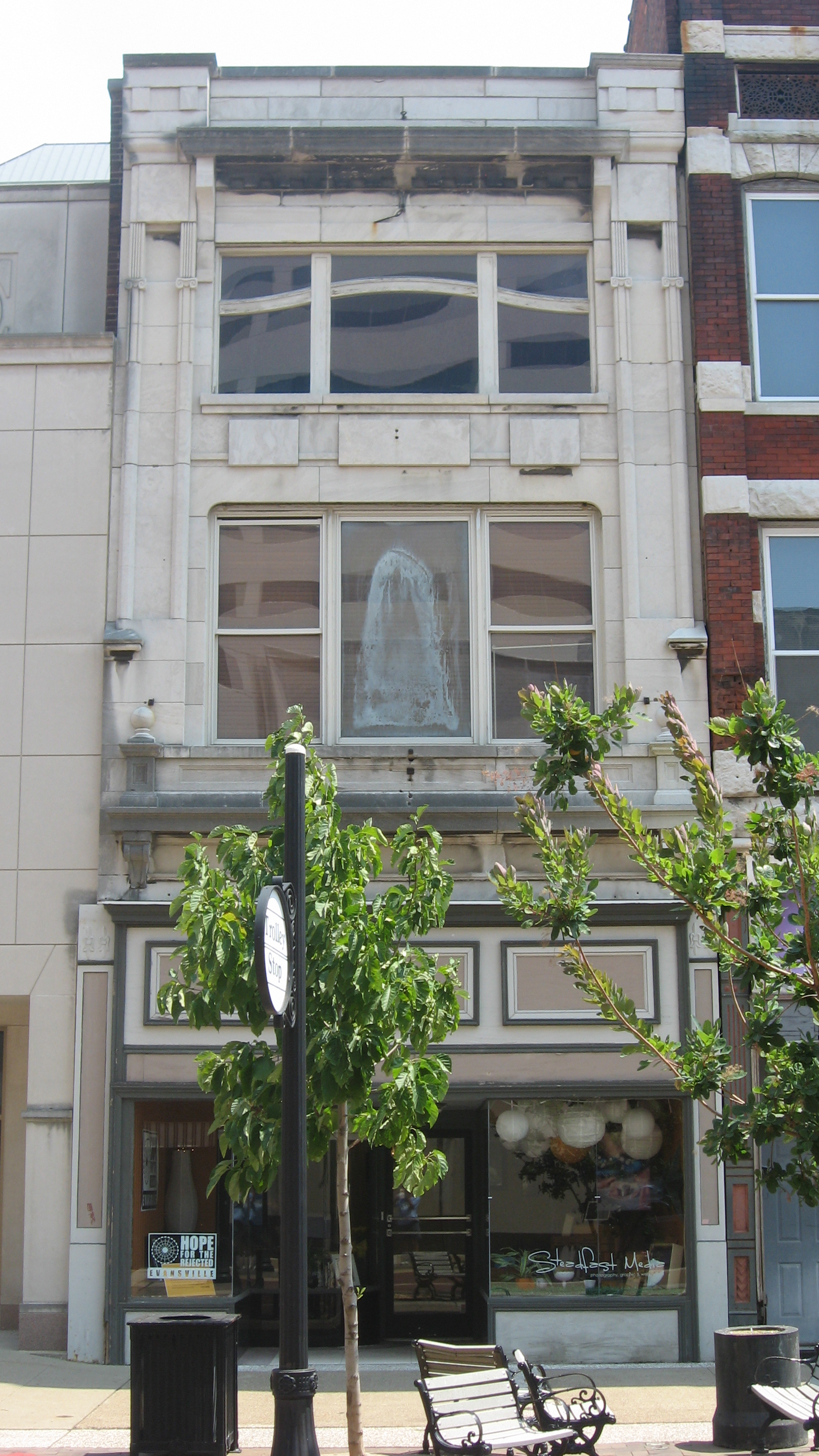
- Building at 223 Main Street, July 2011

- Location within Indiana Location within the United States
- Location: 223 Main St., Evansville, Indiana
- Coordinates: 37°58′15″N 87°34′22″W
- Area: less than one acre
- Built: 1910
- Architect: Schlotter, Frank J.
- Architectural style: Late 19th And Early 20th Century American Movements, Art Nouveau
- MPS: Downtown Evansville MRA
- NRHP reference No.: 82000083
- Added to NRHP: July 1, 1982

223 Main Street is a historic commercial building located in downtown Evansville, Indiana, United States. It was built in 1910, and is a three-story, Art Nouveau style building.

It was listed on the National Register of Historic Places in 1982.
