= Auto Hotel Building =

- U.S. National Register of Historic Places
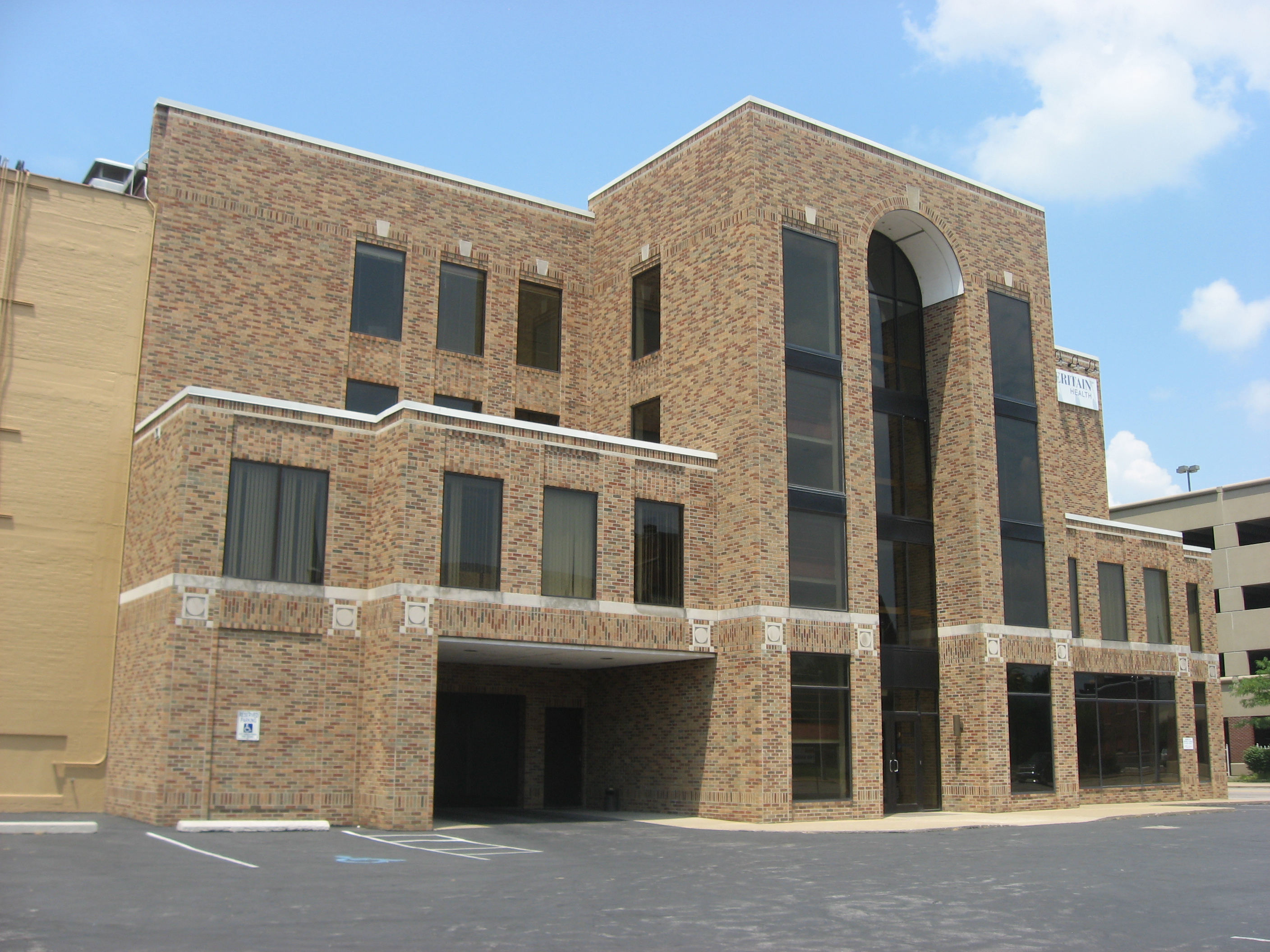
- Auto Hotel Building, July 2011

- Location within Indiana Location within the United States
- Location: 111-115 SE 3rd St., Evansville, Indiana
- Coordinates: 37°58′11″N 87°34′16″W
- Area: 0.5 acres (0.20 ha)
- Built: 1929
- Architect: Boyle, Harry E.
- Architectural style: Colonial Revival
- MPS: Downtown Evansville MRA
- NRHP reference No.: 84001673
- Added to NRHP: April 6, 1984

Auto Hotel Building is a historic parking garage located in downtown Evansville, Indiana. Auto Hotel was built in 1929, and is a four-story, Colonial Revival style brick building.

It was listed on the National Register of Historic Places in 1984.
