= Peter Augustus Maier House =

Historic house in Indiana, United States

- U.S. National Register of Historic Places
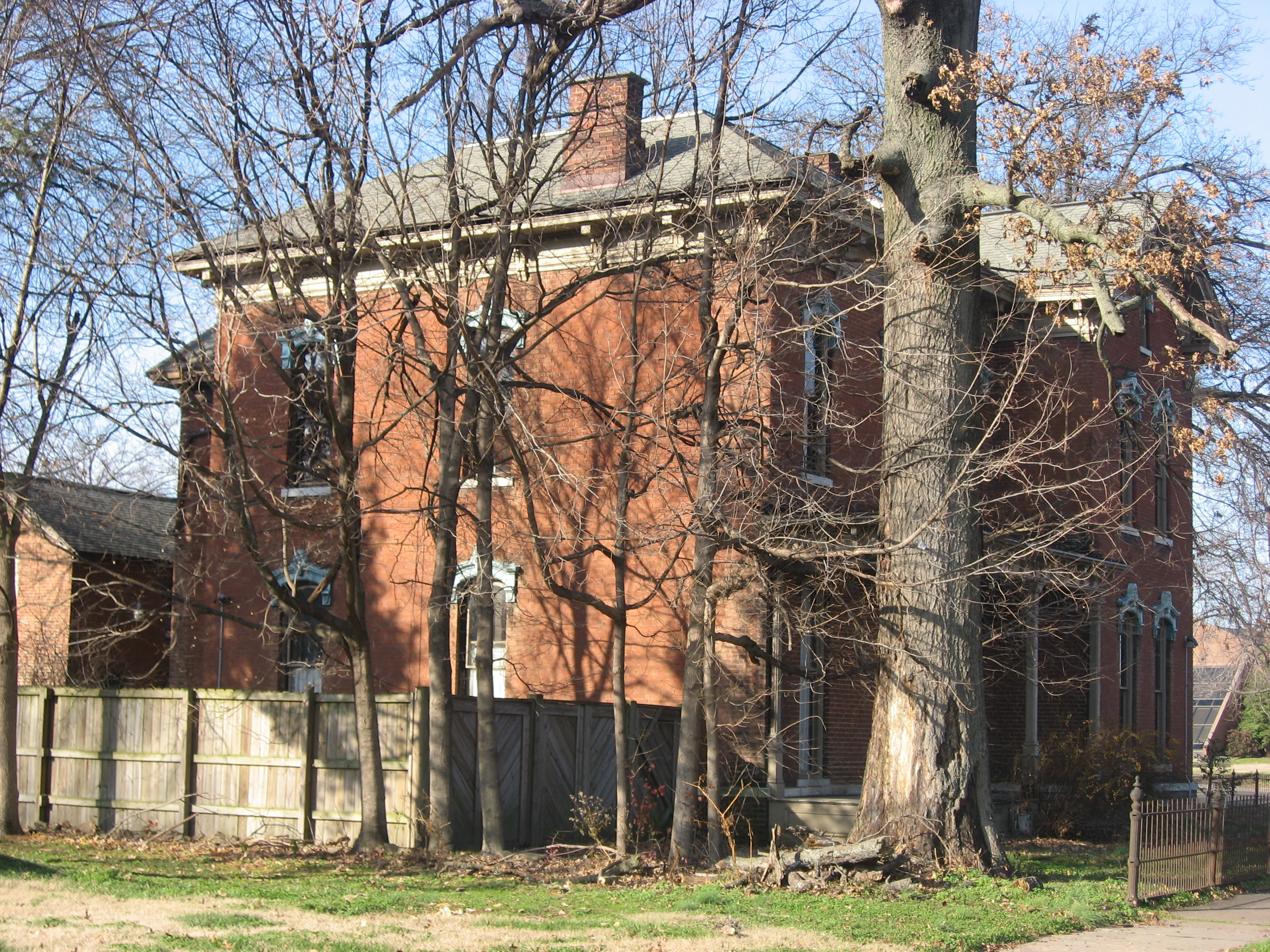
- Peter Augustus Maier House, December 2011

- Location within Indiana Location within the United States
- Location: 707 S. 6th St., Evansville, Indiana
- Coordinates: 37°57′59″N 87°33′50″W
- Area: less than one acre
- Built: 1873
- Architectural style: Italianate
- NRHP reference No.: 82000107
- Added to NRHP: October 29, 1982

Peter Augustus Maier House, also known as the Maier-Pollard House , is a historic home located at Evansville, Indiana, United States. It was built in 1873, and is a 2 1/2-story, "L"-plan, Italianate style brick dwelling. It has a low-pitched slate cross-gable roof and features a bracketed cornice and paneled frieze. Also on the property is a contributing carriage house and original wrought iron fence.

It was added to the National Register of Historic Places in 1982.
