= John H. Roelker House =

Historic house in Indiana, United States

- U.S. National Register of Historic Places
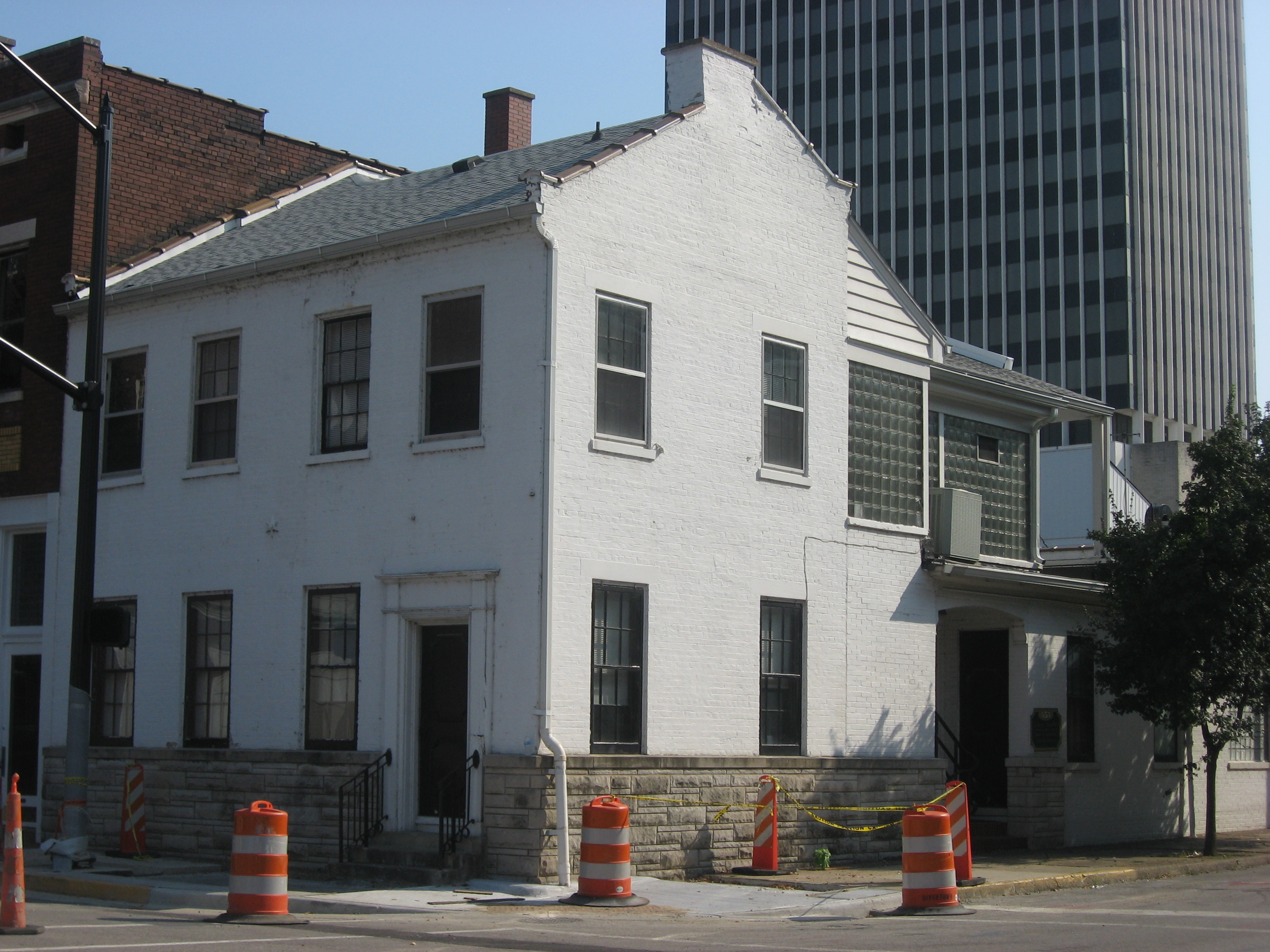
- John H. Roelker House, July 2011

- Location within Indiana Location within the United States
- Location: 555 Sycamore St., Evansville, Indiana
- Coordinates: 37°58′24″N 87°34′11″W
- Area: 0.1 acres (0.040 ha)
- Built: 1858
- MPS: Downtown Evansville MRA
- NRHP reference No.: 84001741
- Added to NRHP: April 6, 1984

John H. Roelker House is a historic home located in downtown Evansville, Indiana. It was built in 1858, and is a three-story, four-bay, brick dwelling.

It was listed on the National Register of Historic Places in 1984.
