= Andrew Hutchinson House =

Historic house in Indiana, United States

- Formerly listed on the U.S. National Register of Historic Places
- Location: 410 Fulton Ave., Evansville, Indiana
- Area: less than one acre
- Built: 1851
- Built by: Hutchinson, Andrew
- MPS: Downtown Evansville MRA
- NRHP reference No.: 82000101

Significant dates
- Added to NRHP: July 1, 1982
- Removed from NRHP: June 27, 1991

Andrew Hutchinson House was a historic home located in downtown Evansville, Indiana. It was built in 1851. It has been demolished.

It was listed on the National Register of Historic Places in 1982 and delisted in 1991.
