= Barrett's Britz Building =

- U.S. National Register of Historic Places
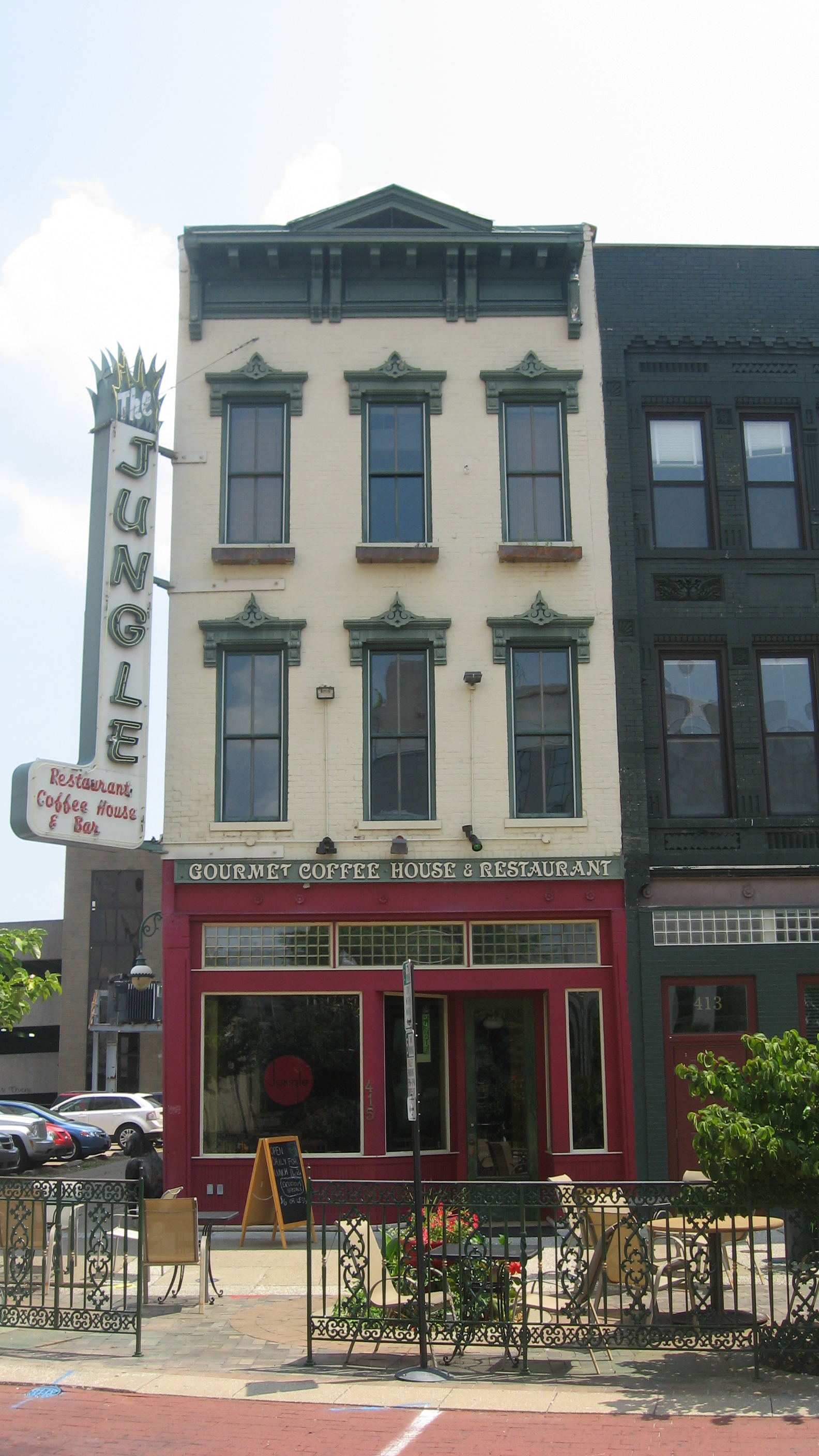
- Barrett's Britz Building, July 2011

- Location within Indiana Location within the United States
- Location: 415 Main St., Evansville, Indiana
- Coordinates: 37°58′18″N 87°34′14″W
- Area: 0.1 acres (0.040 ha)
- Built: 1875
- Architectural style: Italianate
- MPS: Downtown Evansville MRA
- NRHP reference No.: 84001679
- Added to NRHP: April 6, 1984

Barrett's Britz Building is a historic commercial building located in downtown Evansville, Indiana. It was built in 1875, and is a three-story, Italianate style brick building. It features a decorative cornice and window surrounds.

It was listed on the National Register of Historic Places in 1984.
