= Daescher Building =

- Formerly listed on the U.S. National Register of Historic Places
- Location: 12-12 1/2 SE 2nd St., Evansville, Indiana
- Area: less than one acre
- Built: 1886
- MPS: Downtown Evansville MRA
- NRHP reference No.: 82000089

Significant dates
- Added to NRHP: July 1, 1982
- Removed from NRHP: December 6, 1995

Daescher Building, also known as Kleiderer Brothers, was a historic commercial building located in downtown Evansville, Indiana. It was built in 1886. It was demolished in September, 1995

It was listed on the National Register of Historic Places in 1982 and delisted in 1995.
