= Conner's Bookstore =

- U.S. National Register of Historic Places
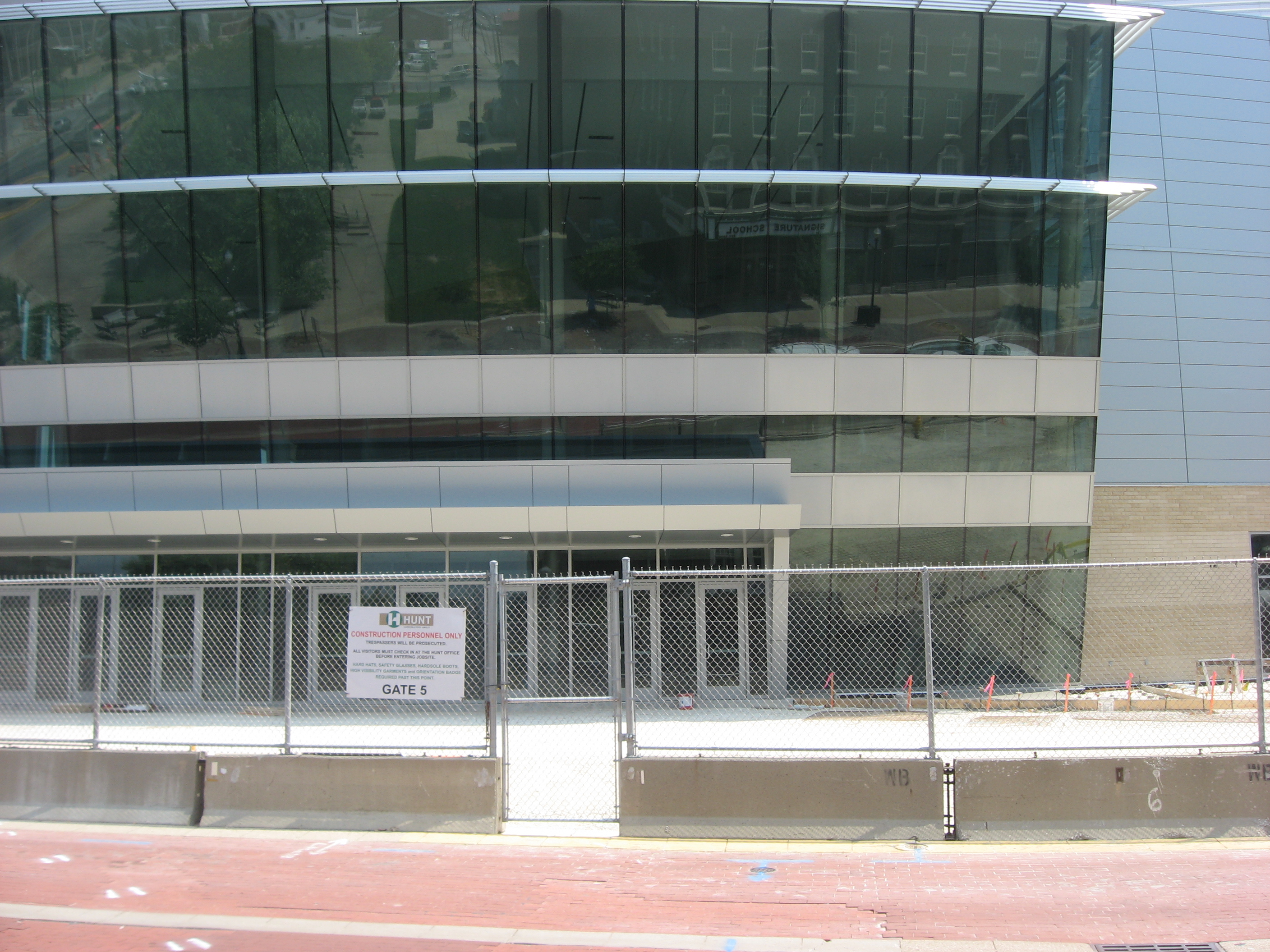
- Conner's Bookstore site, July 2011

- Location within Indiana Location within the United States
- Location: 611-613 Main St., Evansville, Indiana
- Coordinates: 37°58′23″N 87°34′7″W
- Area: 0.2 acres (0.081 ha)
- Built: 1865
- Architectural style: Commercial Vernacular
- MPS: Downtown Evansville MRA
- NRHP reference No.: 84001684
- Added to NRHP: April 6, 1984

Conner's Bookstore, also known as Dallas Music, was a historic commercial building located in downtown Evansville, Indiana. It was built in 1865, and was a vernacular building. It has been demolished.

It was listed on the National Register of Historic Places in 1984.
