= Garvin Park =

- U.S. National Register of Historic Places
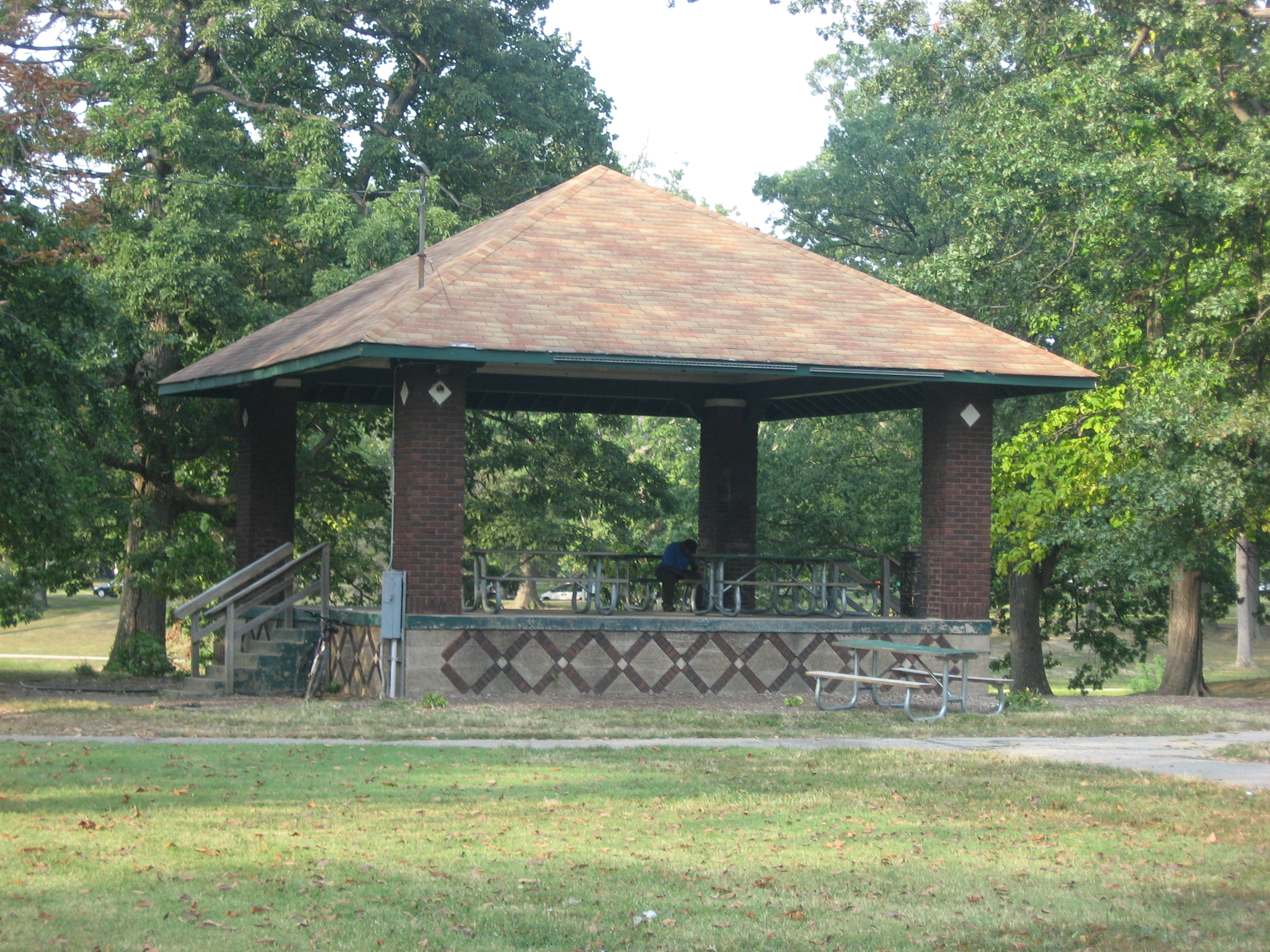
- Bandstand in Garvin Park, September 2011

- Location within Indiana Location within the United States
- Location: N. Main St. and Morgan Ave., Evansville, Indiana
- Coordinates: 37°59′43″N 87°33′50″W
- Area: 87 acres (35 ha)
- Built: 1915
- Architect: West, Myron H.
- NRHP reference No.: 80000069
- Added to NRHP: August 29, 1980

Garvin Park is a historic public park located in Evansville, Indiana, United States. It was planned and laid out in 1915 for the city of Evansville in a naturalistic landscape style. Located in the park are the contributing concrete and stone bridges and a Works Progress Administration-era bandstand.

It was listed on the National Register of Historic Places in 1980.
