= O'Donnell Building =

- U.S. National Register of Historic Places
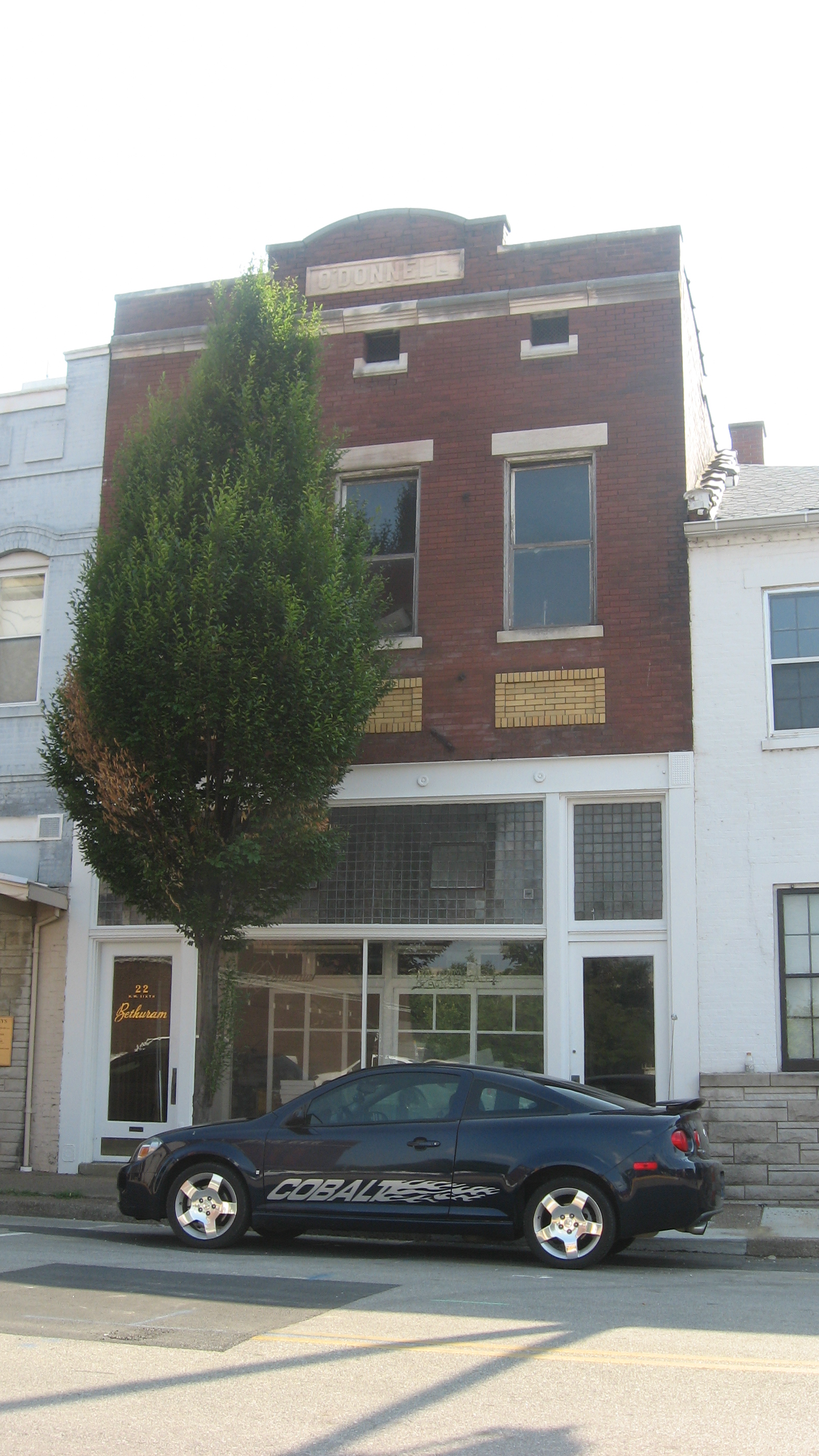
- O'Donnell Building, July 2011

- Location within Indiana Location within the United States
- Location: 22 NW 6th St., Evansville, Indiana
- Coordinates: 37°58′23″N 87°34′11″W
- Area: less than one acre
- Built: 1900
- MPS: Downtown Evansville MRA
- NRHP reference No.: 82000115
- Added to NRHP: July 1, 1982

The O'Donnell Building (also known as the Bethuram-O'Donnell Building) is a historic commercial building located in downtown Evansville, Indiana.

== Description and history ==
It was built in 1900, and is a 2 1/2-story, three bay wide, brick building. The features a decorative parapet.

It was listed on the National Register of Historic Places on July 1, 1982.
