= Koester/Patburg House =

Historic house in Indiana, United States

- U.S. National Register of Historic Places
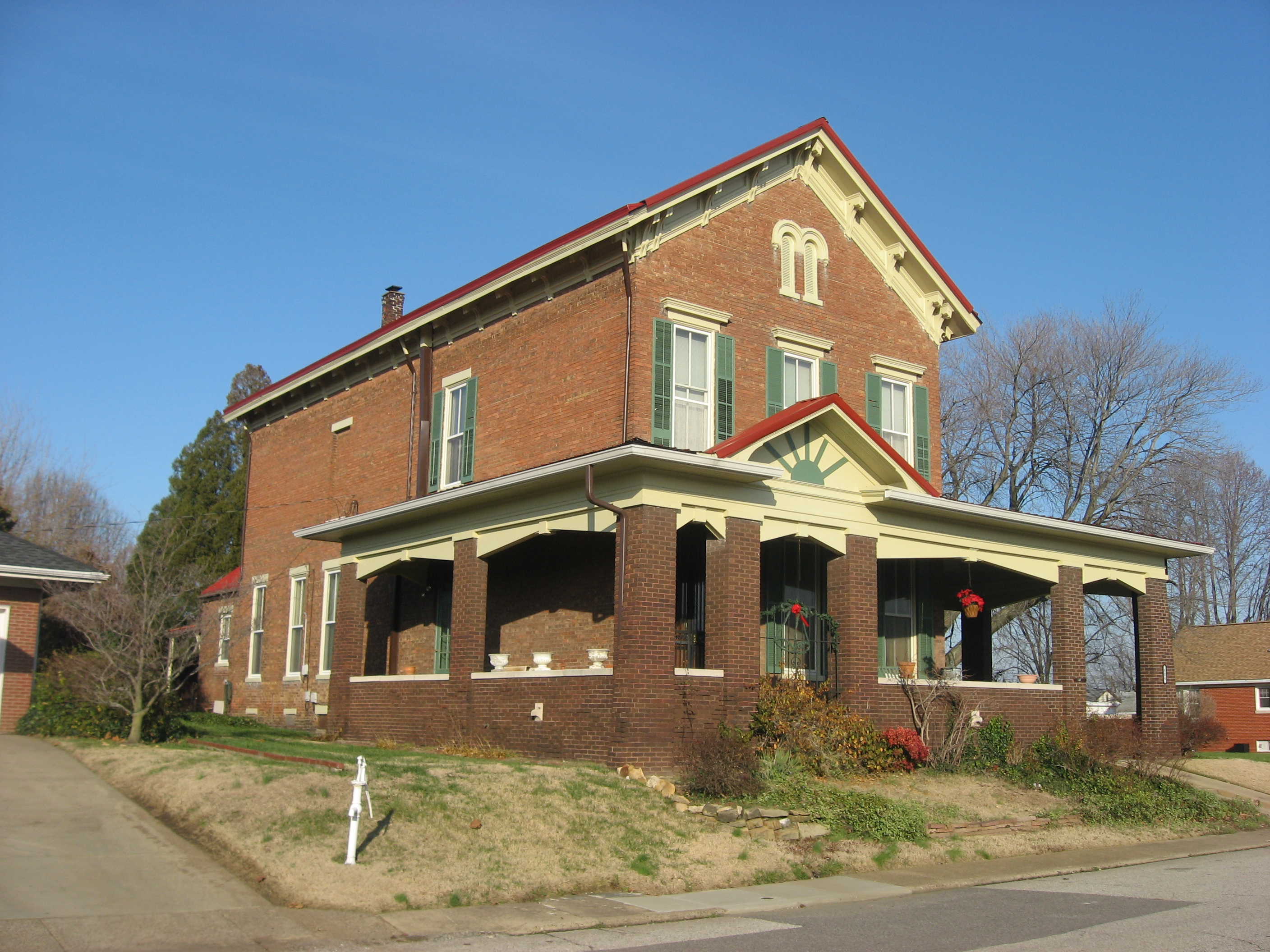
- Koester-Patburg House, December 2011

- Location within Indiana Location within the United States
- Location: 504 Herndon Dr., Evansville, Indiana
- Coordinates: 37°59′48″N 87°33′22″W
- Area: less than one acre
- Built: 1873
- Architect: Mursinna, Henry
- Architectural style: Italianate
- NRHP reference No.: 83000151
- Added to NRHP: March 3, 1983

Koester/Patburg House is a historic home located at Evansville, Indiana. It was built in 1873–1874, and is a two-story, rectangular, Italianate style brick dwelling. It has a low-pitched front gable roof and features a bracketed cornice and paneled frieze and original slatted shutters. It has a porch and porte cochere added in the 1920s. It was originally built as the country home of a wholesale grocer.

It was added to the National Register of Historic Places in 1983.
