= Ridgway Building =

- U.S. National Register of Historic Places
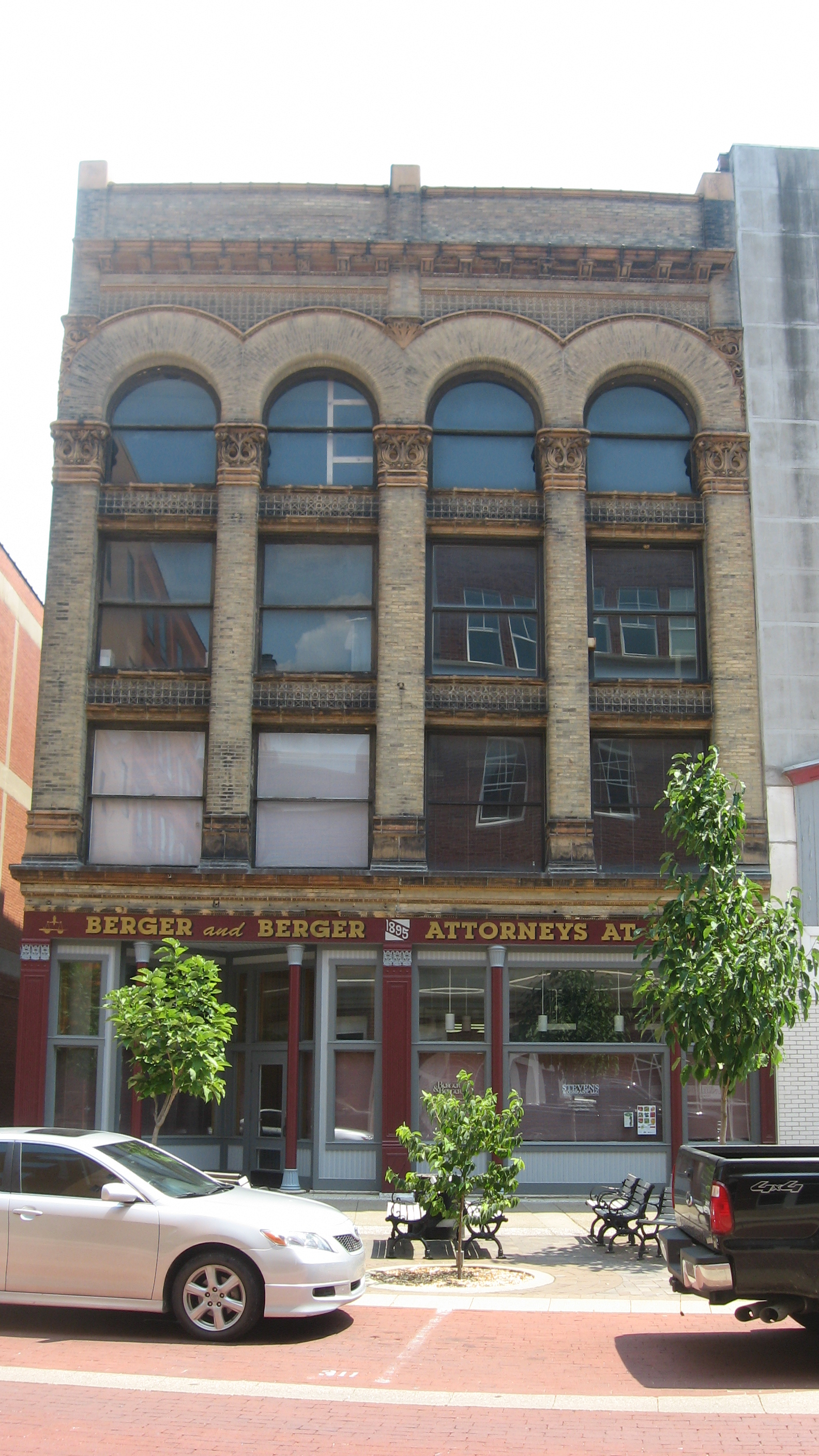
- Ridgway Building, July 2011

- Location within Indiana Location within the United States
- Location: 313-315 Main St., Evansville, Indiana
- Coordinates: 37°58′15″N 87°34′18″W
- Area: 1 acre (0.40 ha)
- Built: 1860, 1895
- NRHP reference No.: 80000071
- Added to NRHP: January 3, 1980

Ridgway Building is a historic commercial building located in downtown Evansville, Indiana. It was built in 1860 and remodeled in 1895, and is a 3 1/2-story brick building. It features 2 1/2-story buff brick arched bays and orange terra cotta ornamentation.

It was added to the National Register of Historic Places in 1980.
