= Fellwock Garage =

- U.S. National Register of Historic Places
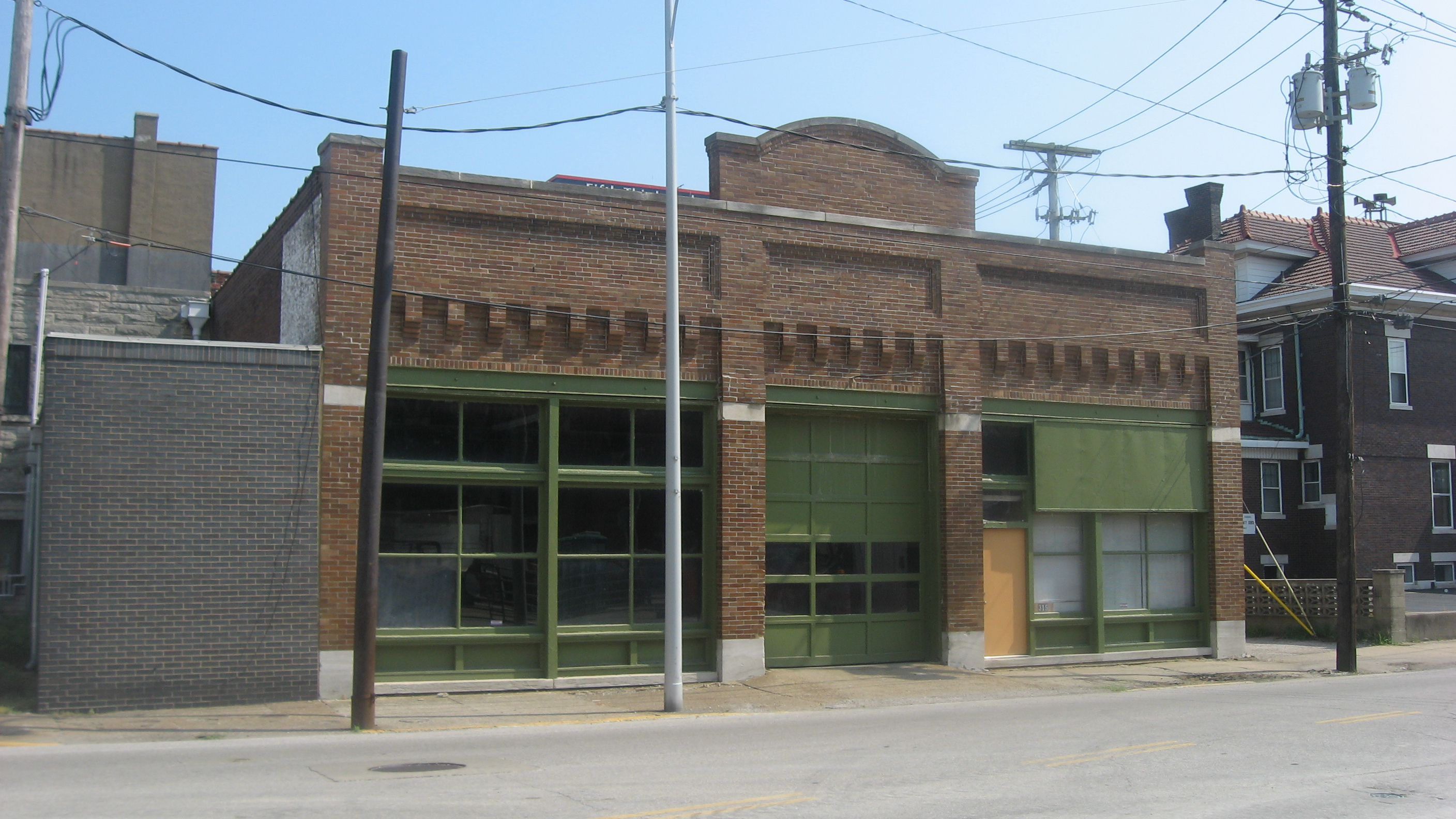
- Fellwock Garage, July 2011

- Location within Indiana Location within the United States
- Location: 315 Court St., Evansville, Indiana
- Coordinates: 37°58′25″N 87°34′24″W
- Area: 0.1 acres (0.040 ha)
- Built: 1908
- Architect: Harris & Shopbell Co.
- MPS: Downtown Evansville MRA
- NRHP reference No.: 84001701
- Added to NRHP: April 6, 1984

Fellwock Garage, also known as Glass Specialty Company, is a historic commercial building located in downtown Evansville, Indiana. It was designed by the architecture firm Harris & Shopbell Co. and built in 1908.

It was listed on the National Register of Historic Places in 1984.
