= Furniture Building =

- Court Building (Furniture Building)
- U.S. National Register of Historic Places
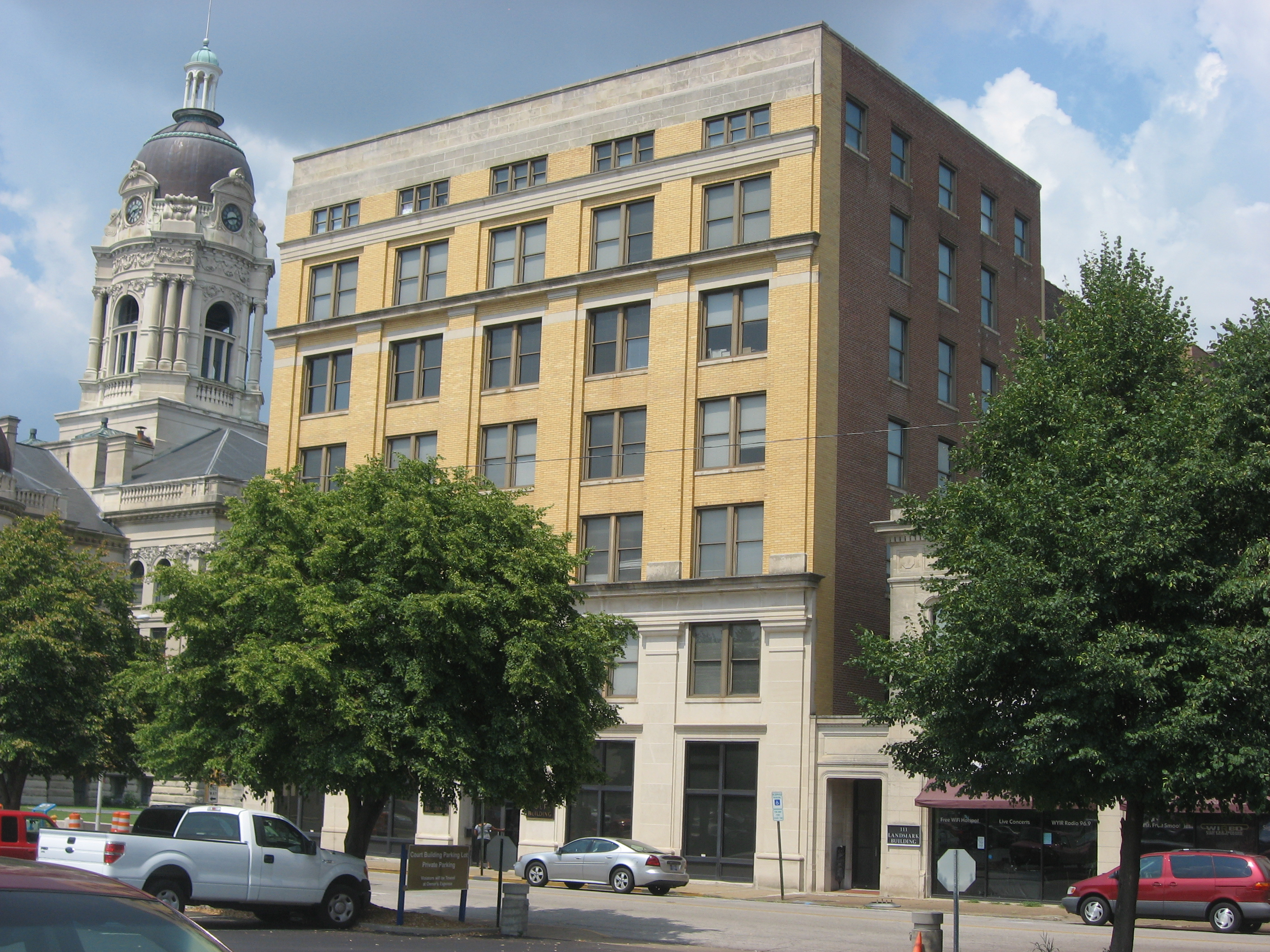
- Furniture Building, July 2011

- Location within Indiana Location within the United States
- Location: 123-125 NW 4th St., Evansville, Indiana
- Coordinates: 37°58′24″N 87°34′20″W
- Area: less than one acre
- Built: 1909
- Architect: Harris & Shopbell
- Architectural style: Beaux Arts
- MPS: Downtown Evansville MRA
- NRHP reference No.: 82000088
- Added to NRHP: July 1, 1982

Court Building, also known as the Furniture Building, is a historic commercial building located in downtown Evansville, Indiana. It was designed by the architectural firm Harris & Shopbell and built in 1909. It is a seven-story, Beaux Arts style building sheathed in brick and limestone.

It was listed on the National Register of Historic Places in 1982.
