= Huber Motor Sales Building =

- U.S. National Register of Historic Places
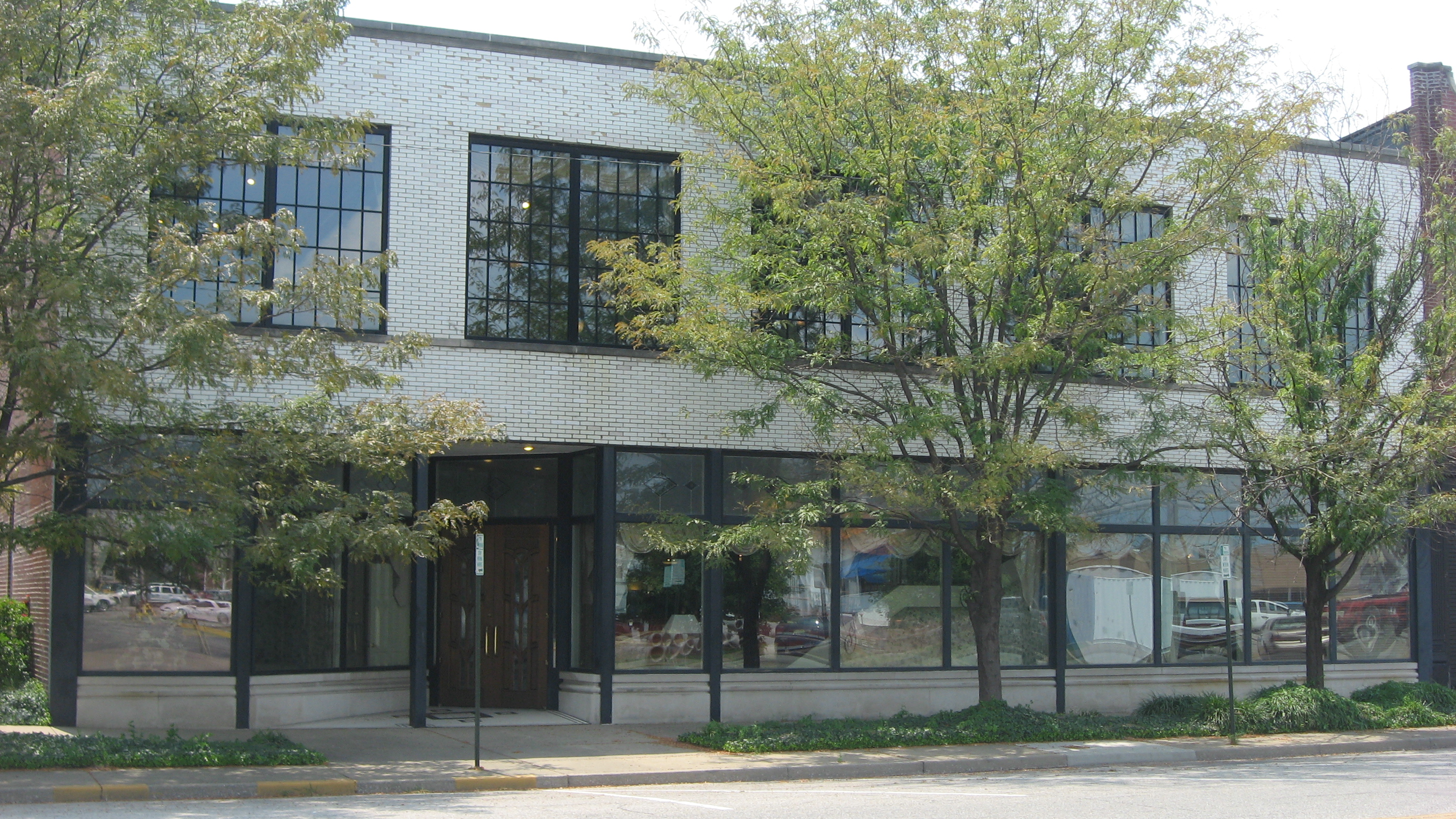
- Huber Motor Sales Building, July 2011

- Location within Indiana Location within the United States
- Location: 215-219 SE 4th St., Evansville, Indiana
- Coordinates: 37°58′10″N 87°34′10″W
- Area: 0.2 acres (0.081 ha)
- Built: 1916
- Architect: Shopbell & Co.
- MPS: Downtown Evansville MRA
- NRHP reference No.: 84001715
- Added to NRHP: April 6, 1984

Huber Motor Sales Building, also known as Kenny Kent Body Shop, is a historic commercial building located in downtown Evansville, Indiana. It was designed by the architecture firm Shopbell & Company and built in 1916. It is a two-story, brick building.

It was listed on the National Register of Historic Places in 1984.
