= Rose Terrace =

Rose Terrace may refer to:

- Rose Terrace (Evansville, Indiana), United States
- Rose Terrace (Grosse Point Farms, Michigan), Anna Dodge's mansion near Detroit, United States
- Rose Terrace (Perth, Scotland), Georgian street in Perth, Scotland
- Rose Terrace (Staunton, Virginia), United States
