= Fire Station No. 12 =

Fire Station No. 12, or variations such as Engine House No. 12, may refer to:

- Fire Station No. 12 (Birmingham, Alabama)
- Hose House No. 12, Evansville, Indiana
- Engine House No. 12 (Columbus, Ohio)
- Engine Company 12, Washington, D.C.

== See also ==
- List of fire stations
