= Evansville Municipal Market =

- U.S. National Register of Historic Places
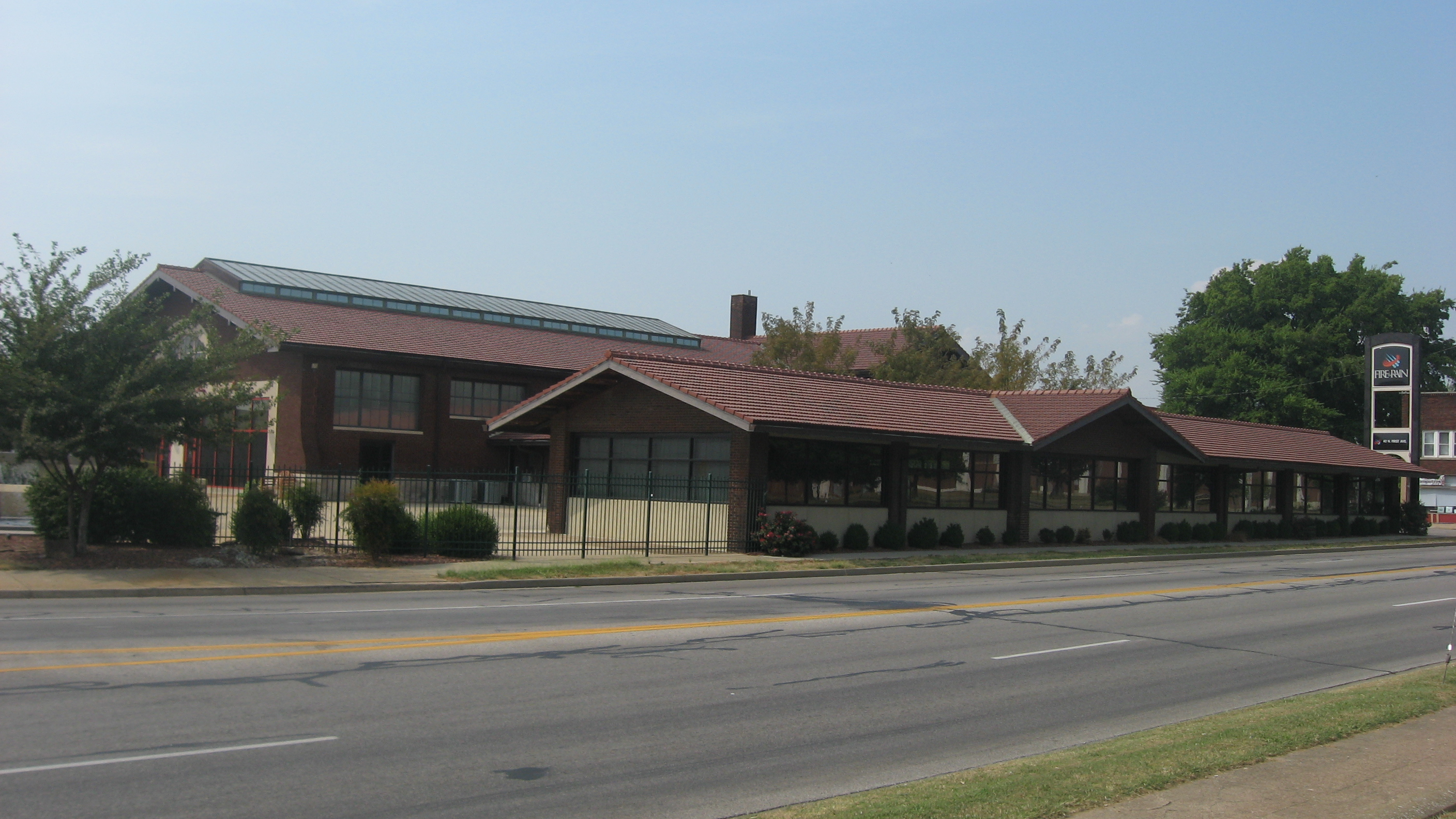
- Evansville Municipal Market, July 2011

- Location within Indiana Location within the United States
- Location: 813 Pennsylvania St., Evansville, Indiana
- Coordinates: 37°58′41″N 87°34′33″W
- Area: less than one acre
- Built: 1916-1918
- Architect: Shopbell, Clifford,& Co.; Thole, Edward J.
- Architectural style: Prairie School
- NRHP reference No.: 83003771
- Added to NRHP: December 22, 1983

Evansville Municipal Market, also known as Old City Market, is a historic public market located in downtown Evansville, Indiana. It was designed by Edward J. Thole of the architecture firm Clifford Shopbell & Co. and built between 1916 and 1918 for the city of Evansville. It is a two-story, Prairie School style brick building. It has a low red pantile roof with deep overhanging eaves. It was converted for use as a fire station in 1954.

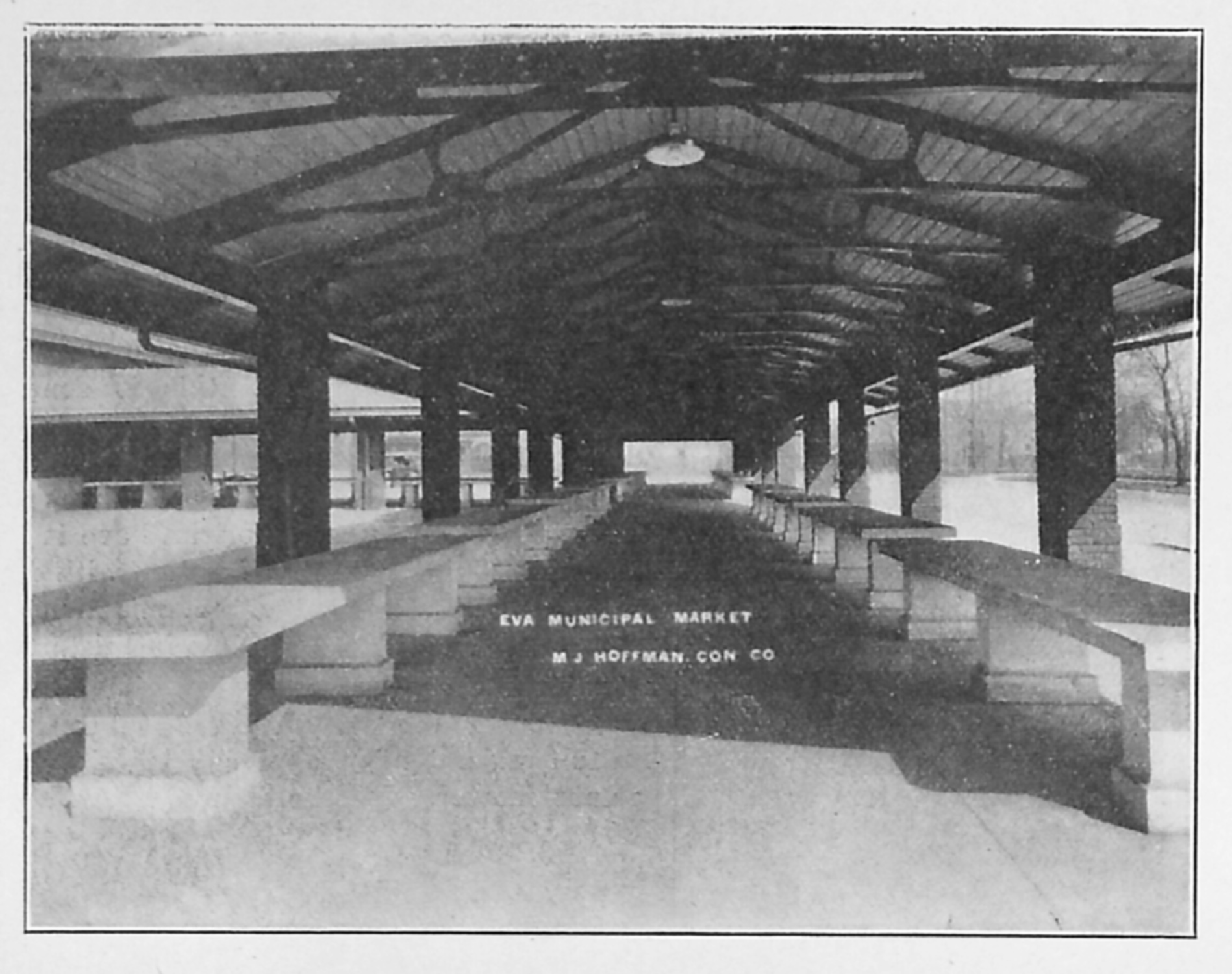
Internal view of Evansville Municipal Market with merchants' wares displayed.

It was listed on the National Register of Historic Places in 1983.
