= Ingle Terrace =

- U.S. National Register of Historic Places
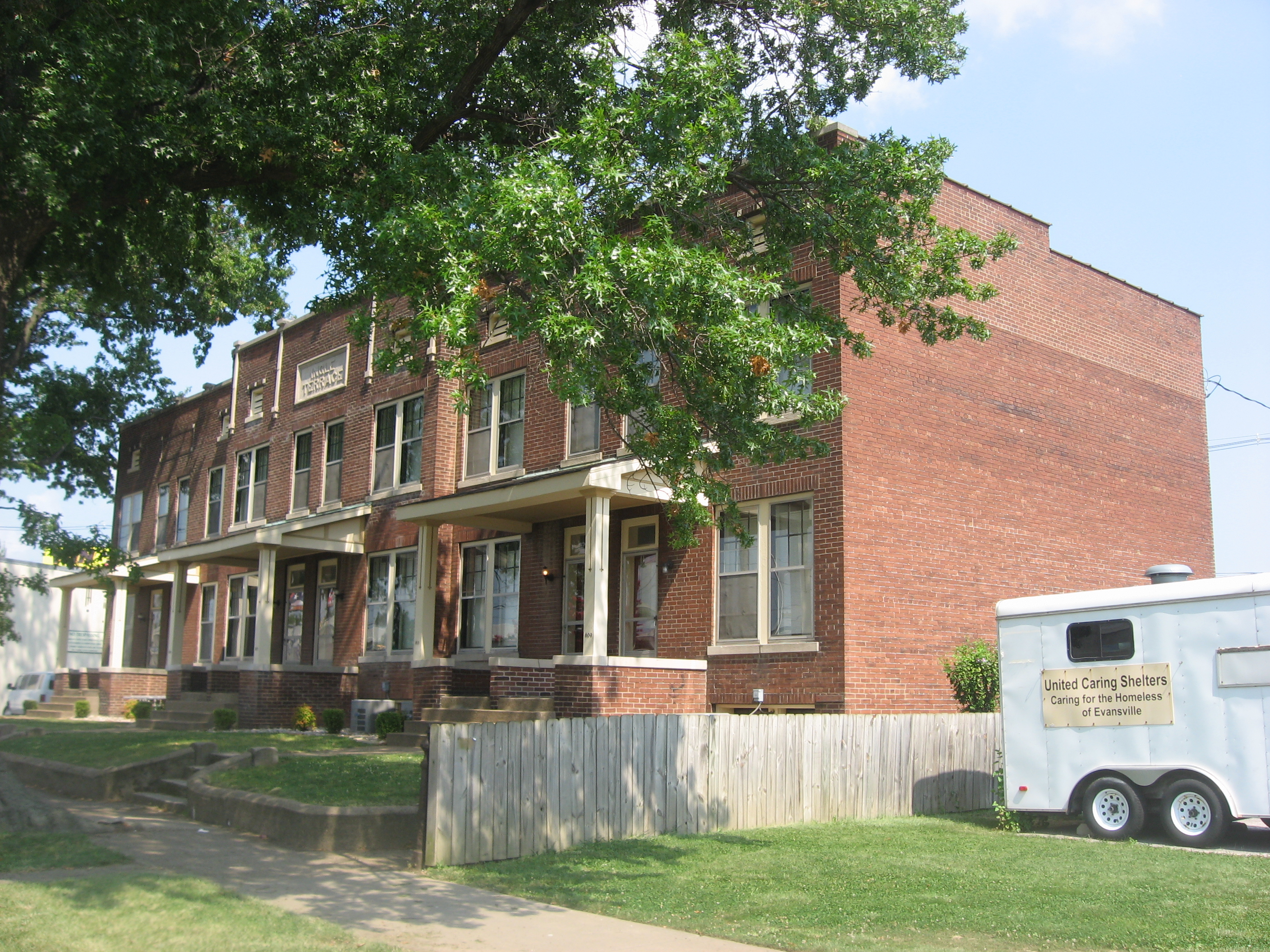
- Ingle Terrace, July 2011

- Location within Indiana Location within the United States
- Location: 609-619 Ingle St., Evansville, Indiana
- Coordinates: 37°58′34″N 87°34′17″W
- Area: less than one acre
- Built: 1910
- Architect: Shopbell & Company
- MPS: Downtown Evansville MRA
- NRHP reference No.: 82000104
- Added to NRHP: July 1, 1982

Ingle Terrace is a housing unit in downtown Evansville, Indiana. It was designed by the architectural firm Shopbell & Company and built in 1910 as part of a trend to reform crowded living conditions for the working class.

It was listed on the National Register of Historic Places in 1982.
