= Fred Geiger and Sons National Biscuit Company =

- U.S. National Register of Historic Places
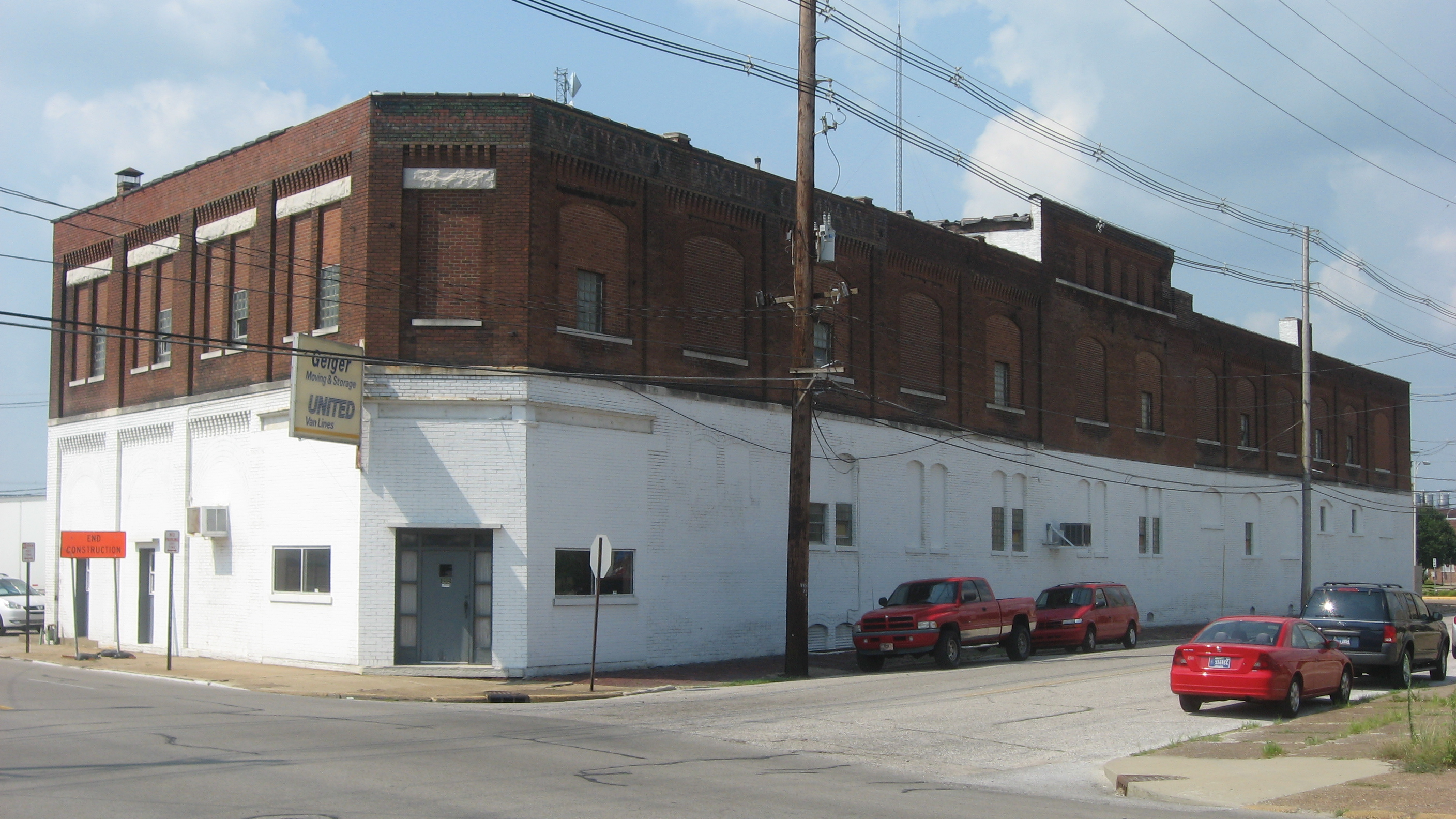
- Fred Geiger and Sons National Biscuit Company, July 2011

- Location within Indiana Location within the United States
- Location: 401 NW 2nd St, Evansville, Indiana
- Coordinates: 37°58′26″N 87°34′32″W
- Area: less than one acre
- Built: 1894
- Architect: Linsey, H. C.
- MPS: Downtown Evansville MRA
- NRHP reference No.: 82000096
- Added to NRHP: July 1, 1982

Fred Geiger and Sons National Biscuit Company is a historic biscuit factory building located in downtown Evansville, Indiana. It was built in 1894, and is a two-story, brick building. It features decorative brickwork, segmental arched openings, and limestone detailing. It housed Fred Geiger and Sons, a manufacturer for the National Biscuit Company.

It was listed on the National Register of Historic Places in 1982.
