= Buckingham Apartments =

- Formerly listed on the U.S. National Register of Historic Places
- Location within Indiana Location within the United States
- Location: 314-316 SE 3rd St., Evansville, Indiana
- Coordinates: 37°58′3″N 87°34′10″W
- Area: less than one acre
- Built: 1911
- Architect: Shopbell & Company
- Architectural style: Bungalow/craftsman, Arts & Crafts
- MPS: Downtown Evansville MRA
- NRHP reference No.: 82000082

Significant dates
- Added to NRHP: July 1, 1982
- Removed from NRHP: May 5, 2011

Buckingham Apartments was a historic apartment building located in downtown Evansville, Indiana. It was designed by the architecture firm Shopbell & Company and built in 1911. It was in Arts and Crafts movement style architecture. It was demolished on November 18, 1998

It was listed on the National Register of Historic Places in 1982 and delisted in 2011.
