= Kuebler–Artes Building =

- U.S. National Register of Historic Places
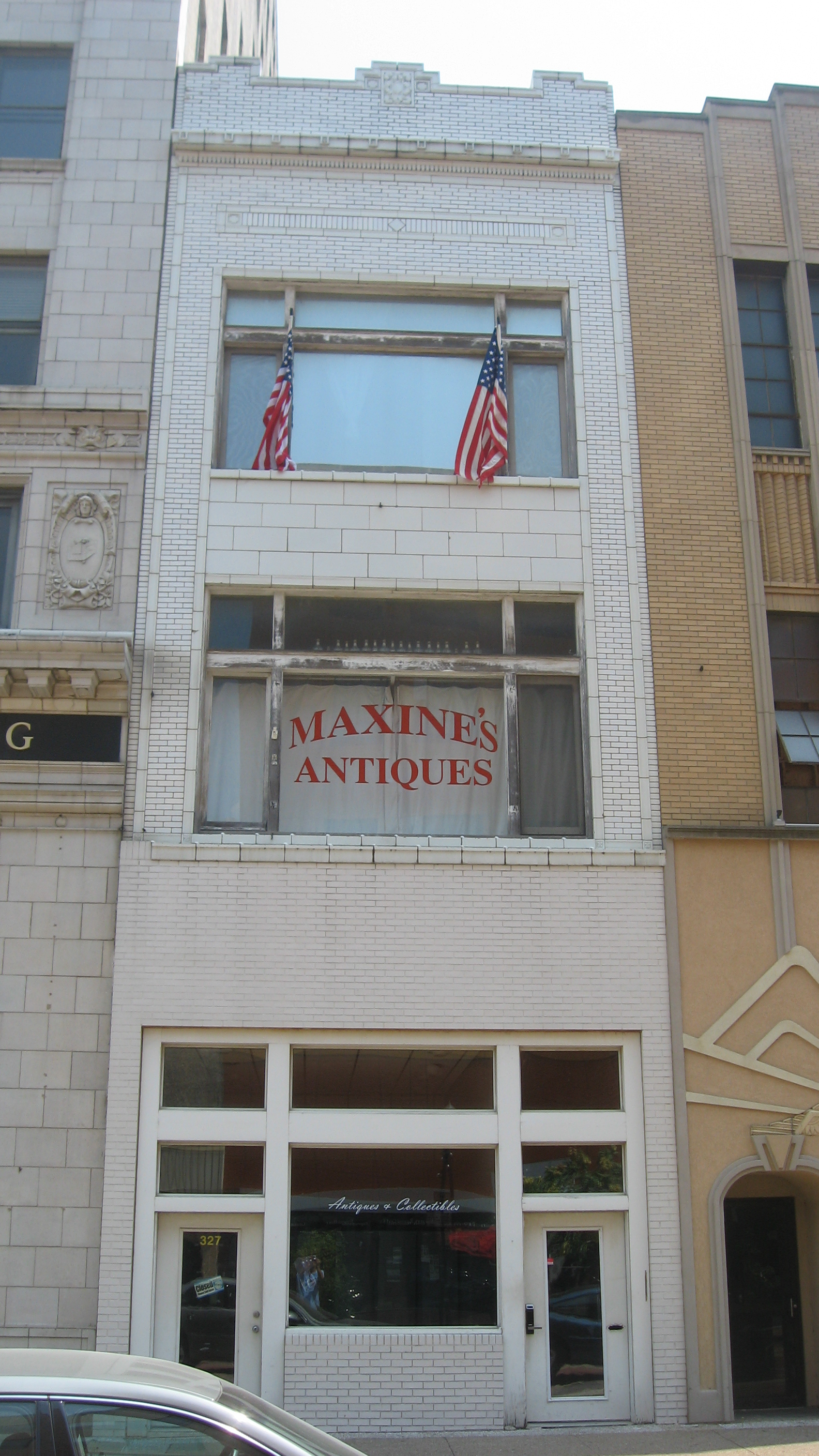
- Kuebler–Artes Building, July 2011

- Location within Indiana Location within the United States
- Location: 327 Main St., Evansville, Indiana
- Coordinates: 37°58′17″N 87°34′17″W
- Area: 0.1 acres (0.040 ha)
- Built: 1915
- Architect: Shopbell & Co.
- Architectural style: Prairie School
- MPS: Downtown Evansville MRA
- NRHP reference No.: 84002895
- Added to NRHP: April 6, 1984

Kuebler–Artes Building is a historic commercial building located in downtown Evansville, Indiana. It was designed by the architecture firm Shopbell & Company and built in 1915. It is a three-story, one-bay, Prairie School style brick building.

It was listed on the National Register of Historic Places in 1984.
