= Michael D. Helfrich House =

Historic house in Indiana, United States

- U.S. National Register of Historic Places
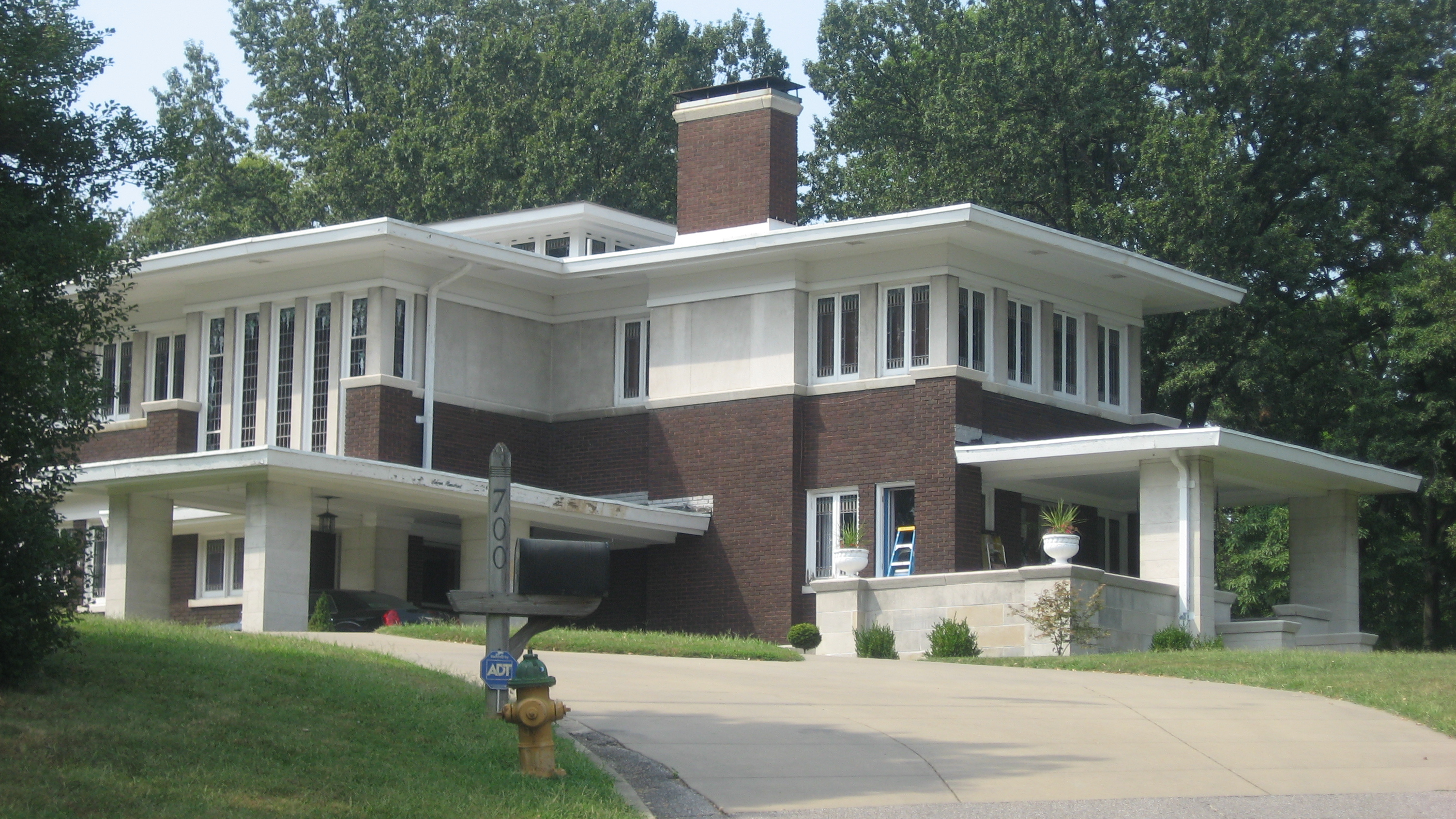
- Michael D. Helfrich House, September 2011

- Location within Indiana Location within the United States
- Location: 700 Helfrich Lane, Evansville, Indiana
- Coordinates: 37°59′5″N 87°36′23″W
- Area: 6.7 acres (2.7 ha)
- Built: 1920
- Built by: Jacob-Bippus & Sons
- Architect: Shopbell, Clifford, & Co.
- Architectural style: Prairie School
- NRHP reference No.: 84001710
- Added to NRHP: May 24, 1984

Michael D. Helfrich House is a historic home located at Evansville, Indiana. It was designed by the architectural firm Clifford Shopbell & Co. and built in 1920. It is a two-story, Prairie School style brown brick and limestone sheathed dwelling. It features a complex arrangement of interlocking masses, art glass windows, corner piers, massive brick chimney, and a porte cochere.

It was added to the National Register of Historic Places in 1984.
