= Shopbell & Company =

American architecture firm

- Type: Architecture
- Founded: 1897
- Headquarters: Evansville, Indiana, United States

Clifford Shopbell (in rear, at right) and his staff of architects and engineers; Ed Thole is at typewriter, and Joe Berridge is at his left; photo dated 1919, Courtesy of Willard Library Archives

Shopbell & Company was an American architectural firm located in Evansville, Indiana, in the United States.

== History ==
The firm was founded as Harris & Shopbell in 1897 and still had that name in 1905. The firm later became Clifford Shopbell & Co. (ca 1910), and later still (ca 1916 - 1925) Shopbell, Fowler & Thole. The partners designed buildings during the 1910s and 1920s, mainly in Evansville, but also elsewhere in Indiana and Kentucky. Many of its works survive and are listed on the U.S. National Register of Historic Places.

Evansville, Indiana, historic preservation staff described Clifford Shopbell and Company as "probably the most prominent--or at least the most active" local architectural firm in Evansville's Downtown. They credit several of its works as showing "clear understanding of program and ceremonial demands", note the firm's use of Prairie School design, and commend it for "one creditable Sullivanesque essay," (the Fellwock Auto Company Building). They also note the Indiana Bank and the Masonic Temple in Classical Revival mode, "along with one or two Chicago School buildings".

In 1919, Clifford Shopbell & Co. built the Evansville Municipal Market.

By 1905, Harris & Shopbell had already built 9 Carnegie libraries: Shelbyville, Greensburg, Franklin, Seymour, Salem, Princeton, Alt. Vernon and Poseyville, IN, and Henderson, KY; as Clifford Shopbell, the firm went on to build several more. Illinois preservation staff record that Shopbell also built the Illinois libraries at Carmi in 1914, Grayville in 1913, and Marion in 1916. Illinois preservation staff called Clifford Shopbell "the dominant architect of Carnegie libraries in Indiana, with at least fifteen of that state's commissions". The preservation staff state frankly that:

"Like many architects who sought Carnegie Library commissions, Shopbell welcomed publicity. When the Clarion-News of Princeton, Indiana, interviewed him in 1903, Shopbell mentioned that he was currently building four Carnegie libraries, and said that although smaller libraries were usually constructed of pressed brick, since his firm had "an inside price on stone", if Princeton acted quickly, they too could afford a stone library. The firm of Harris and Shopbell was selected and Princeton built a stone library. As the Illinois libraries built by Shopbell are all of brick, his inside price on stone must not have lasted into the 1910s."

== Principal partners ==
The founding partners were Clifford Shopbell and William J. Harris.

Harris was the senior partner; he was born in Louisville, KY, graduating from the high school there in 1887. After an "apprenticeship" in architecture, Harris opened an office in Evansville in 1895, and formed a partnership with Shopbell in 1897. He was a member of the Freemasons, the Knights of Pythias, and the Elks. He married Bell Hawley in 1894.

Shopbell was born in Princeton, IN, on December 8, 1871. From 1889, Shopbell spent five years in the Indianapolis office of architect W. Scott Moore. In 1894 he moved to Evansville, working with architect C. A. Brehmer. In 1897 he married Winifred Dunlap of Indianapolis and joined Harris to form their architectural partnership. Shopbell was a member of the Freemasons, as well as belonging to the Shriners and the Knights of Pythias. Shopbell died in 1939.

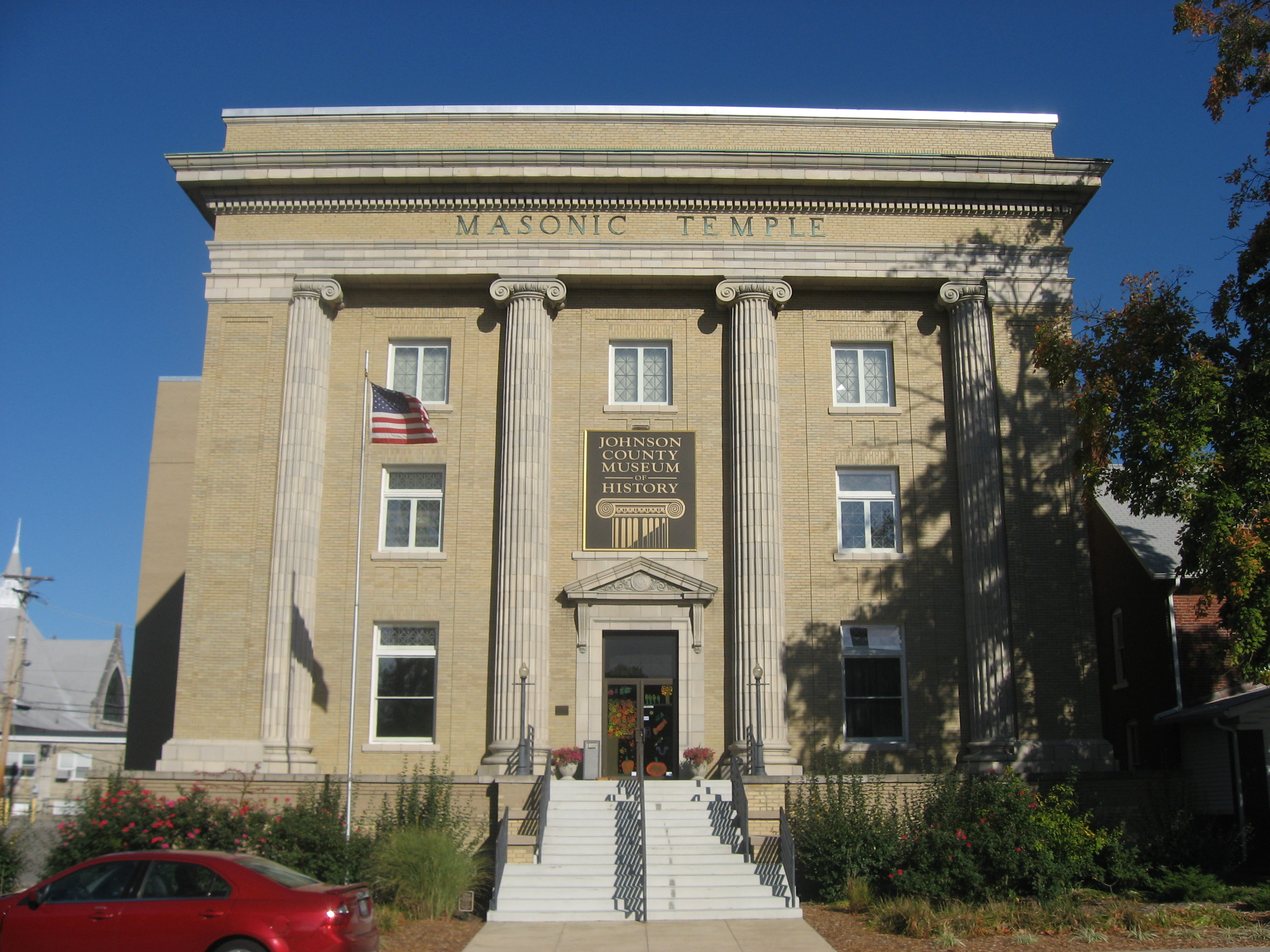
Masonic Temple (Franklin, Indiana), now Johnson County Museum of History

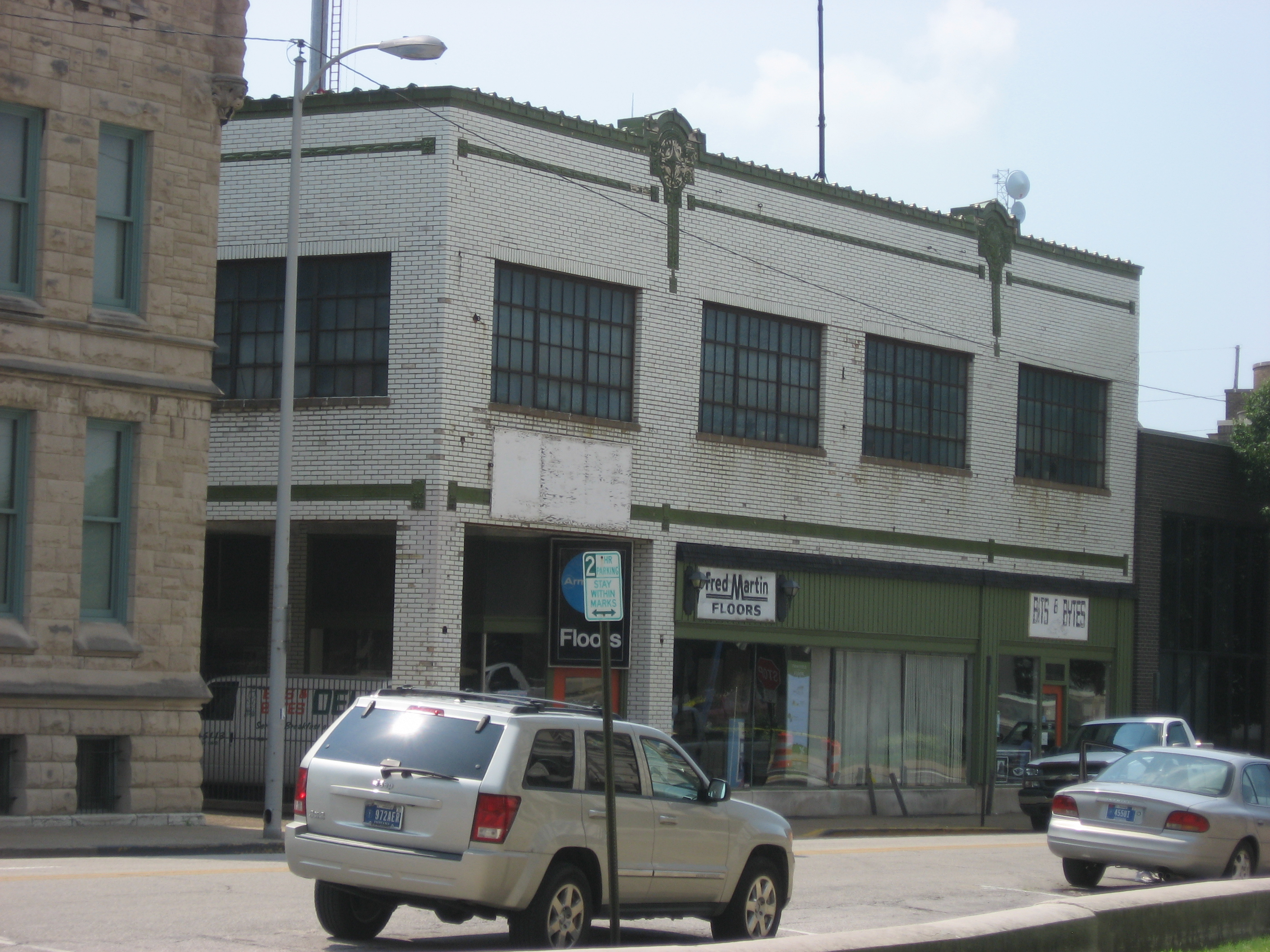
Old Fellwock Auto Company, Evansville

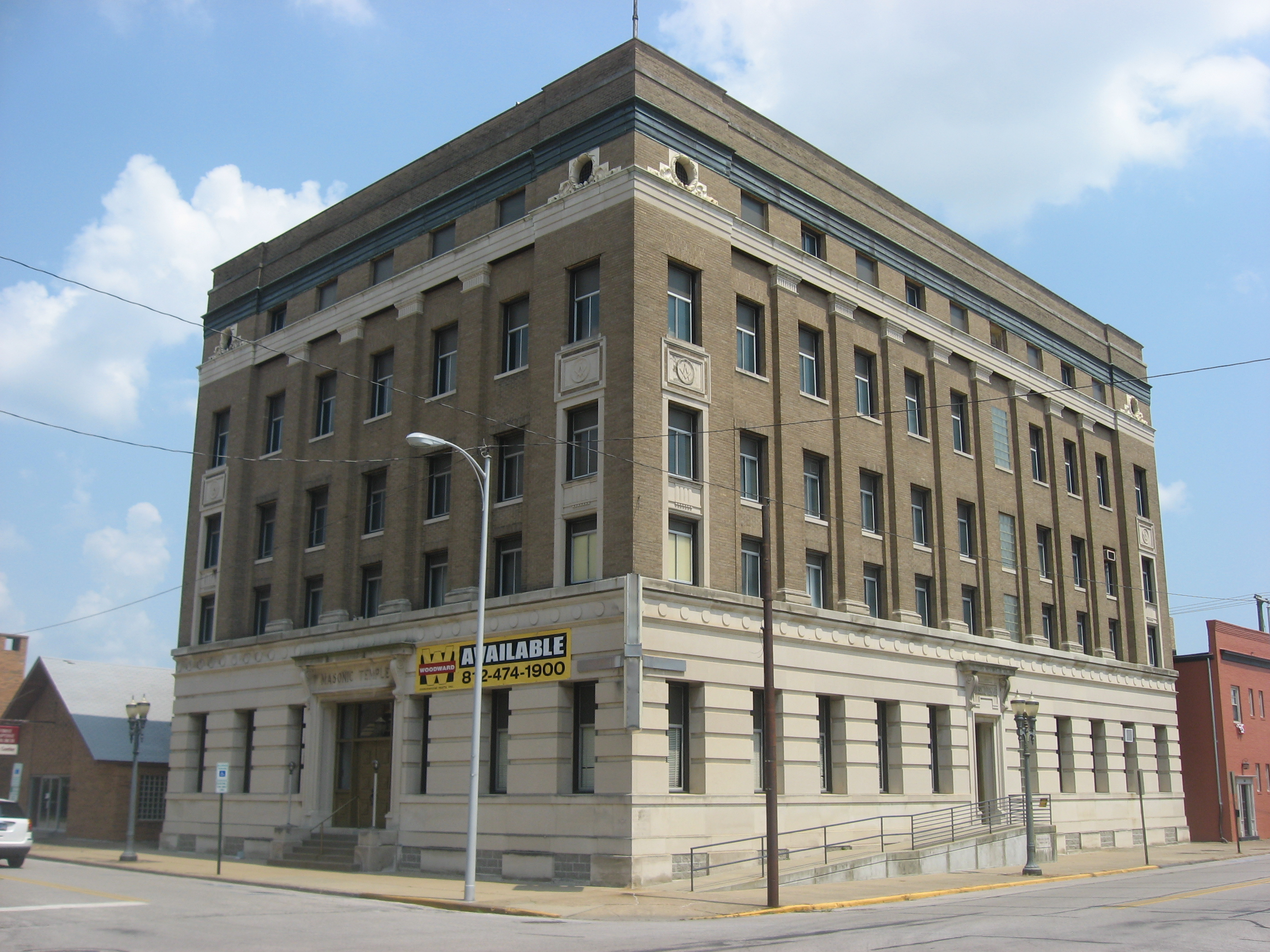
Masonic Temple (Evansville, Indiana)

== Properties constructed ==
Works include (with attribution):

Works by Clifford Shopbell and related companies
Building	Location	Company	Listing
Albion Apartments, "model flats", 1910-11	701 Court St. Evansville	Shopbell & Co.	NRHP
American Trust and Savings Bank (Indiana Bank), 1903, enlarged 1914	524-530 Main St Evansville	Shopbell & Co.	NRHP
Bernardin-Johnson House	17 Johnson Pl. Evansville	Thole, Edward Joseph; Clifford Shopbell & Co.	NRHP
Bitterman Building	202-204 Main St. Evansville	Clifford Shopbell & Co.	NRHP
John W. Boehne House	1119 Lincoln Ave. Evansville	Shopbell, Clifford & Co.	NRHP
Buckingham Apartments (demolished)	314-316 SE 3rd St. Evansville	Shopbell & Co.	NRHP
Busse House	120 SE 1st St. Evansville	Harris & Shopbell	NRHP
Court Building (Furniture Building)	123-125 NW 4th St. Evansville	Harris & Shopbell	NRHP
Evansville Municipal Market	813 Pennsylvania St. Evansville	Shopbell, Clifford, & Co.	NRHP
Old Fellwock Auto Company	214 NW 4th St. Evansville	Shopbell & Co.	NRHP
Fellwock Garage	315 Court St. Evansville	Harris & Shopbell Co.	NRHP
Greensburg Carnegie Public Library	114 N. Michigan Ave. Greensburg, IN	Shopbell, Clifford, & Co.	NRHP
Michael D. Helfrich House	700 Helfrich Lane Evansville	Shopbell, Clifford, & Co.	NRHP
Hose House No. 12	1409 First Ave. Evansville	Harris & Shopbell	NRHP
Huber Motor Sales Building	215-219 SE 4th St. Evansville	Shopbell & Co.	NRHP
Ingle Terrace	609-619 Ingle St. Evansville	Shopbell & Co.	NRHP
Kuebler-Artes Building	327 Main St. Evansville	Shopbell & Co.	NRHP
Masonic Temple (Evansville, IN), 1912	301 Chestnut St. Evansville	Shopbell & Co.	NRHP
Masonic Temple (Franklin, IN), 1922	135 N. Main St. Franklin, IN	Shopbell, Fowler, and Thole	NRHP
Oak Hill Cemetery, 1901	Evansville	Harris & Shopbell	NRHP
Rose Terrace, "model flats", 1910-11	301-313 NW 7th St. Evansville,	Shopbell & Co.	NRHP
Soldiers and Sailors Memorial Coliseum, 1916-17	350 Court St. Evansville	Shopbell, Clifford & Co.	NRHP
Van Cleave Flats	704-708 Court St. Evansville	Shopbell & Co.	NRHP
One or more works	Boonville Public Square Historic District, Boonville, IN	Harris & Shopbell	NRHP
Henderson County Public Library (1904)	Contributing building in South Main & South Elm Streets Historic District, Henderson, KY	Shopbell & Harris	NRHP
One or more works	West Side Historic District, Shelbyville, Indiana	Harris & Shopbell	NRHP

== Bibliography ==
- "NRHP:" (State Historic Preservation Officer) (April 22, 1982). "National Register of Historic Places". Downtown Evansville Multiple Resource Area. United States Department of the Interior Heritage Conservation and Recreation Service. pp. 1–28.
- William J. Harris and Clifford Shopbell. Harris & Shopbell architects, Evansville, Indiana. Harris & Shopbell (publisher), 1908. (Pictures of buildings).
