= Rose Terrace (Evansville, Indiana) =

- U.S. National Register of Historic Places
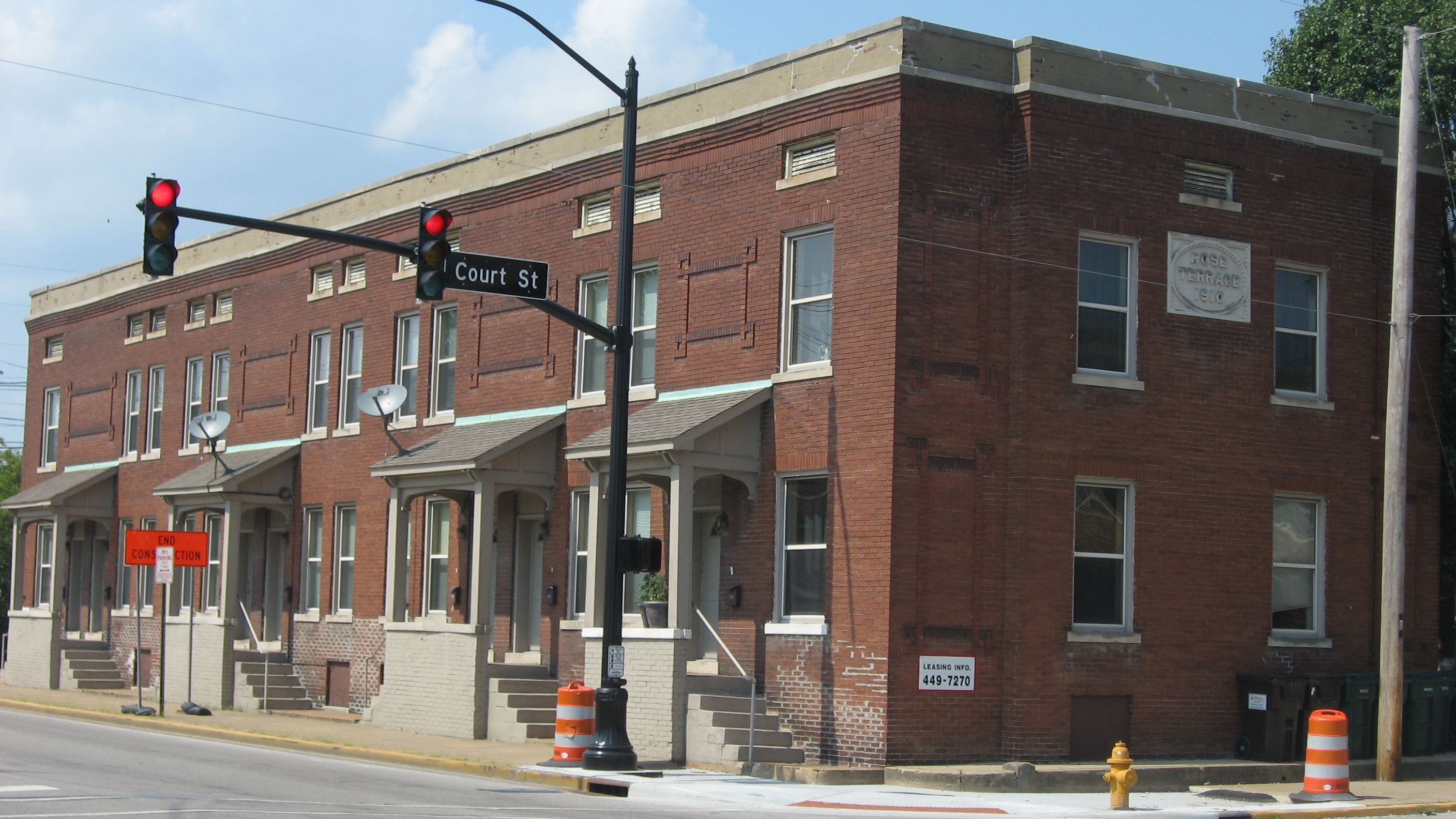
- Rose Terrace, July 2011

- Location within Indiana Location within the United States
- Location: 301-313 NW 7th St., Evansville, Indiana
- Coordinates: 37°58′33″N 87°34′12″W
- Area: less than one acre
- Built: 1910
- Architect: Shopbell & Company
- Architectural style: Prairie School
- MPS: Downtown Evansville MRA
- NRHP reference No.: 82000120
- Added to NRHP: July 1, 1982

Rose Terrace is a housing unit in downtown Evansville, Indiana. The Prairie School style block was designed by the architectural firm Shopbell & Company and built in 1910 as part of a trend to reform crowded living conditions for the working class.

It was listed on the National Register of Historic Places in 1982.
