= American Trust and Savings Bank =

Historic place in Indiana, United States

- American Trust and Savings Bank (Indiana Bank)
- U.S. National Register of Historic Places
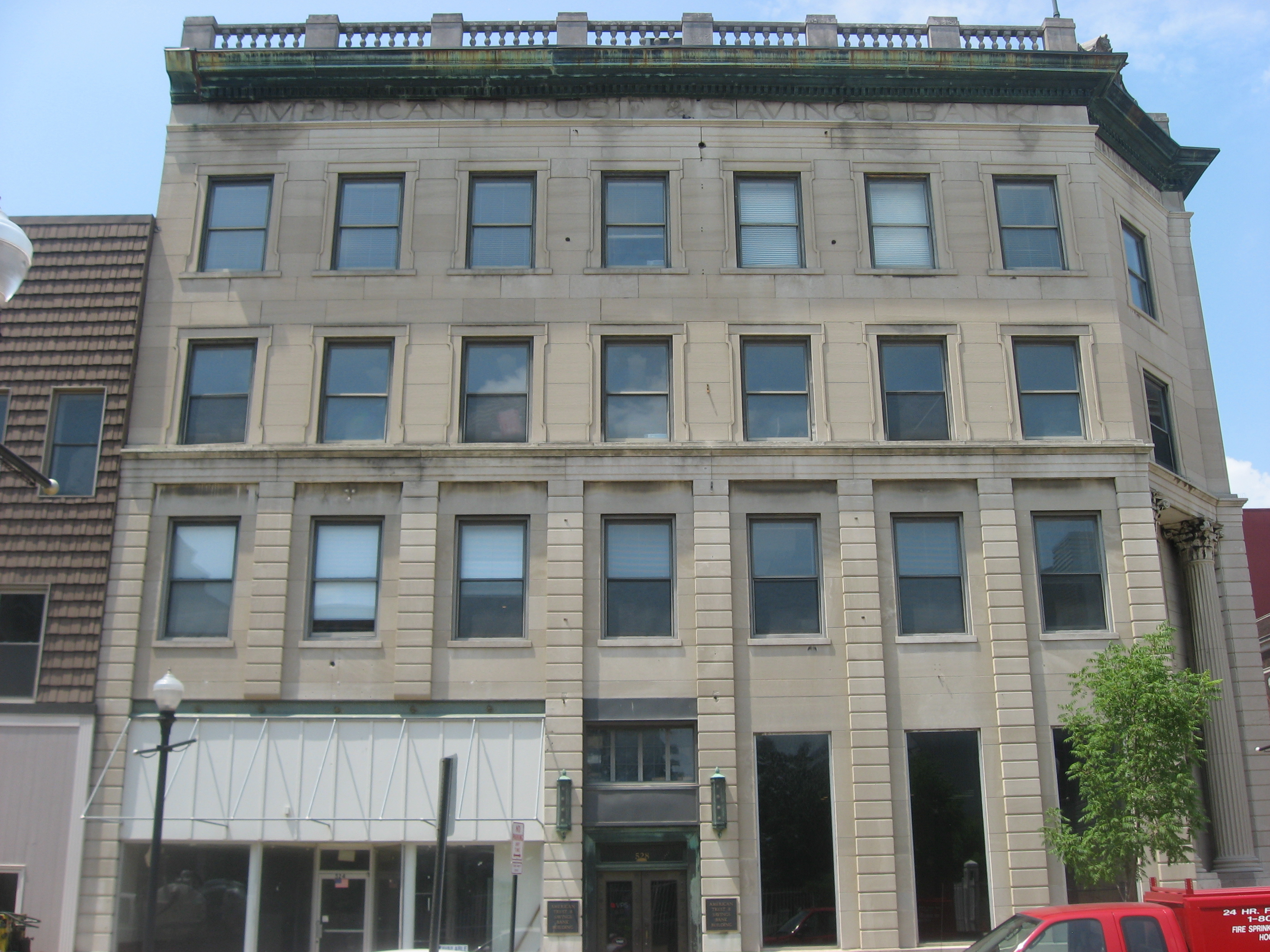
- View from Main Street
- Location: 524-530 Main Street, Evansville, Indiana
- Coordinates: 38°58′21″N 87°34′09″W
- Area: less than one acre
- Built: 1904, 1913
- Architect: Harris & Shopbell
- MPS: Downtown Evansville MRA
- NRHP reference No.: 82000094
- Added to NRHP: July 1, 1982

American Trust and Savings Bank, also known as the Indiana Bank, is a historic bank building located at Sixth and Main Street in downtown Evansville, Indiana. It was designed by the architectural firm Harris & Shopbell and built in 1904. It is a Beaux-Arts style limestone clad building. It was enlarged in 1913 when two additional floors were added. The bank closed on October 19, 1931, during the Great Depression.

It was listed on the National Register of Historic Places in 1982.
