= Evansville Philharmonic Orchestra =

Orchestra based in Indiana, US

The Evansville Philharmonic Orchestra is an orchestra in Evansville, Indiana. Founded in 1934, the orchestra consists of approximately 80 musicians led by conductor Roger Kalia. It is the largest arts institution in the Indiana, Kentucky, and Illinois tri-state area.

The orchestra balances performances by internationally renowned soloists and local artists, popular works and twentieth-century compositions, as well as familiar solo instruments. Past performers have included soloists Itzhak Perlman, André Watts, Roger Williams, Judy Collins, Doc Severinsen, Sandi Patty, Joshua Bell, Frederica von Stade, Daniel Rodriguez, the Eroica Trio, Edgar Meyer, and Béla Fleck.

The organization also features two youth orchestras, the Evansville Philharmonic Youth Orchestra for high school students and the Evansville Philharmonic Youth Orchestra II for middle school students.

The orchestra is governed by a board of directors made up of community volunteers and employs a small full-time and part-time staff.
