= Old Fellwock Auto Company =

- U.S. National Register of Historic Places
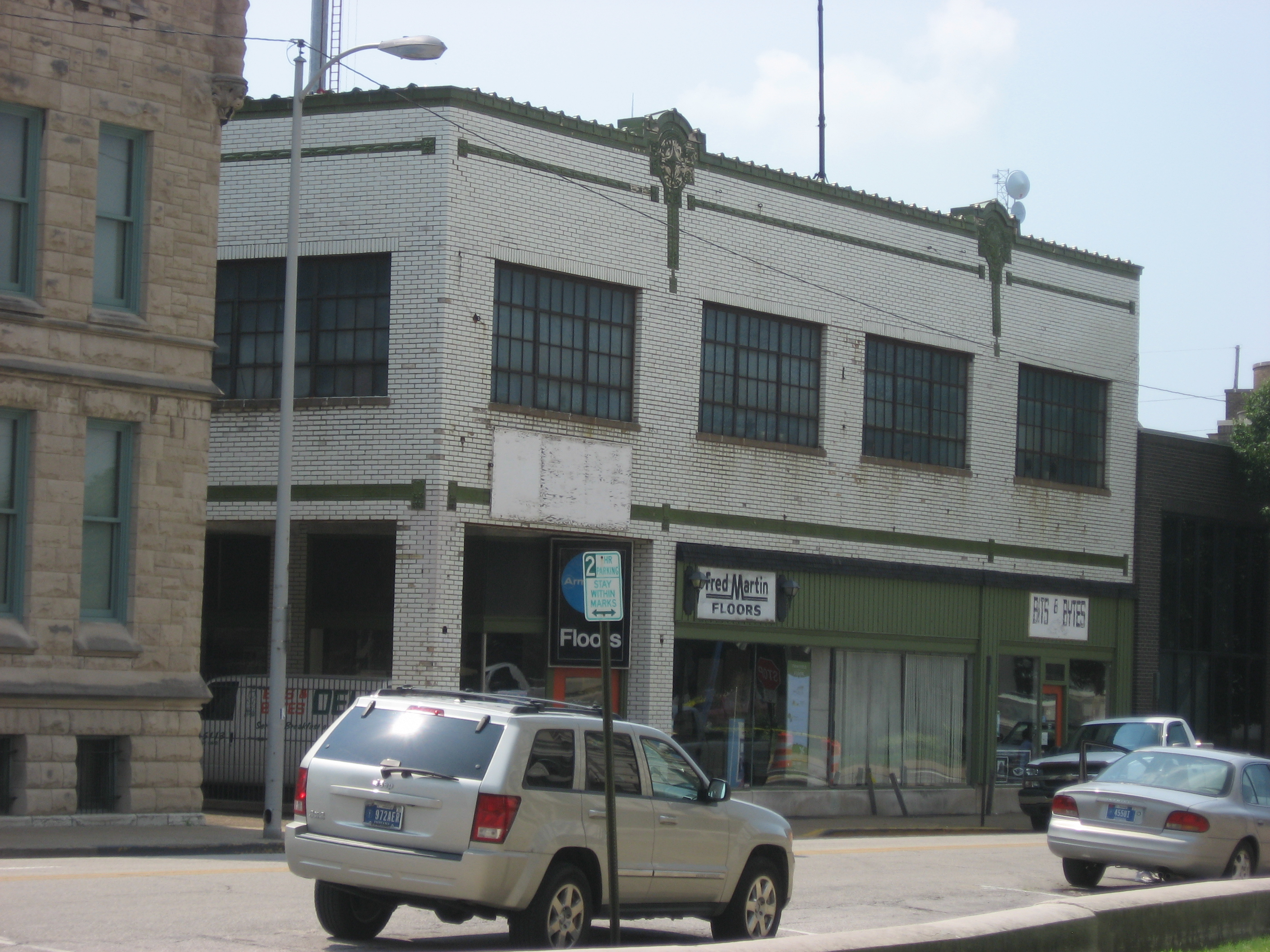

- Location within Indiana Location within the United States
- Location: 214 NW 4th St., Evansville, Indiana
- Coordinates: 37°58′25″N 87°34′22″W
- Area: 0.3 acres (1,200 m^{2})
- Built: 1923
- Architect: Shopbell & Co.; Thole, Edward J.
- Architectural style: Prairie School
- MPS: Downtown Evansville MRA
- NRHP reference No.: 84001735
- Added to NRHP: April 6, 1984

The Old Fellwock Auto Company is a building built in 1923 in fine Prairie School style. It was designed by Shopbell & Company and by Edward J. Thole (who became a partner at Shopbell & Company).

The building is identified by Evansville historic preservation specialists as a "creditable Sullivanesque essay."

It was listed on the U.S. National Register of Historic Places in 1984.
