= Masonic Temple (Evansville, Indiana) =

- U.S. National Register of Historic Places
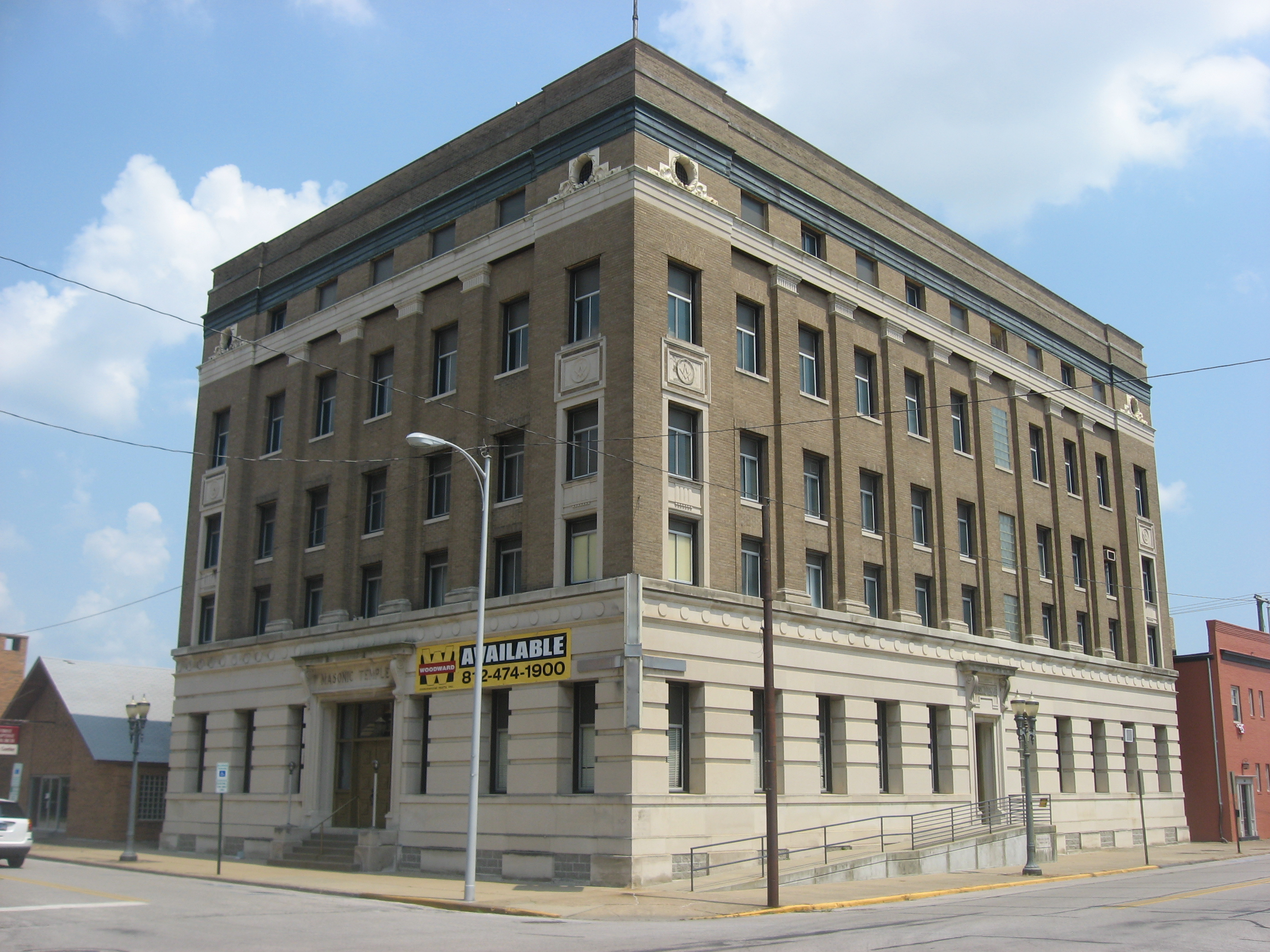
- Front and side

- Location within Indiana Location within the United States
- Location: 301 Chestnut St., Evansville, Indiana
- Coordinates: 37°58′7″N 87°34′11″W
- Area: less than one acre
- Built: 1912
- Architect: Shopbell & Company
- Architectural style: Classical Revival
- MPS: Downtown Evansville MRA
- NRHP reference No.: 82000108
- Added to NRHP: July 1, 1982

The Masonic Temple in Evansville, Indiana, US, is a building from 1912. It was designed by the local architects Shopbell & Company in Classical Revival style. The lodge building once hosted three separately chartered Masonic lodges: Evansville Lodge (No. 64), Reed Lodge (No. 316) and Lessing Lodge (No. 464). The building measures 72 x 104 feet, with four stories above ground and a basement. The exterior walls of the first two floors are faced with stone and the stories above are trimmed with both stone and terracotta. The interior floors and partitions are supported by steel columns and girders, also following the Roman classic order.

The Masonic Temple hosts the Lessing and Reed Lodges, mentioned above, and two additional lodges chartered long after the building was completed. The two additional lodges are the Constellation Lodge No. 748 and Daylight Lodge No. 752. All lodges are chartered by the Most Worshipful Grand Lodge of Free and Accepted Masons of the State of Indiana.

The fourth floor of the temple is the York Rite floor. Evansville York Rite is composed of three separately chartered Masonic organizations. Each is chartered by their respective grand body of the State of Indiana. The three organizations are Evansville Chapter No. 12 Royal Arch Masons, Simpson Council No. 23 Cryptic Masons and La Valette Commandery No. 15 Knights Templar.

It was listed on the National Register of Historic Places in 1982.

== See also ==
- List of Masonic buildings in Indiana
- National Register of Historic Places listings in Vanderburgh County, Indiana
