= Hose House No. 12 =

- U.S. National Register of Historic Places
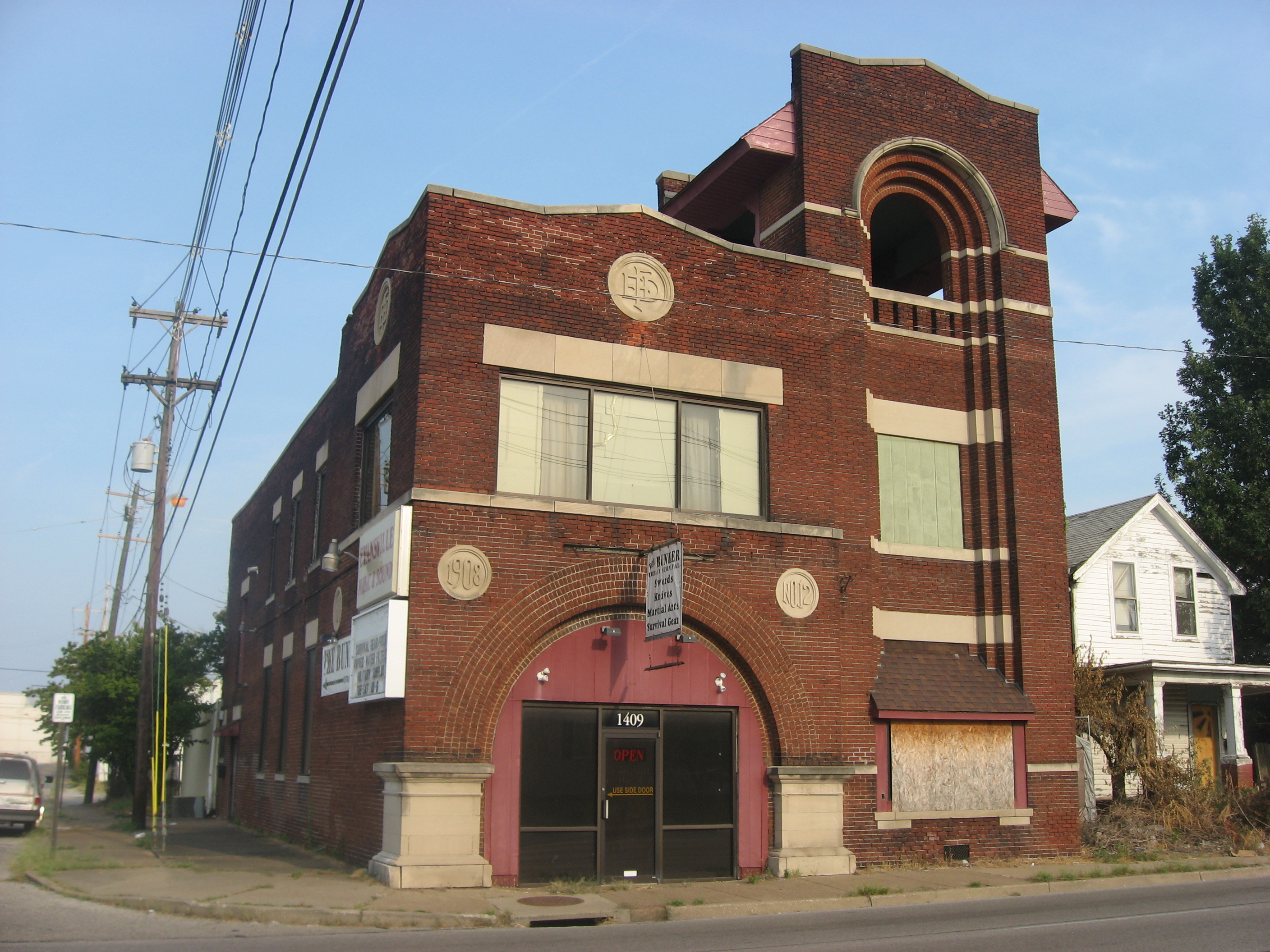
- Hose House No. 12, September 2011

- Location within Indiana Location within the United States
- Location: 1409 First Ave., Evansville, Indiana
- Coordinates: 37°59′28″N 87°34′27″W
- Area: less than one acre
- Built: 1908
- Architect: Scarborough & Davies; Harris & Shopbell
- NRHP reference No.: 82000100
- Added to NRHP: June 17, 1982

Hose House No. 12, also known as Bassemier's Gas Grills, Inc., is a historic fire station located at Evansville, Indiana. It was designed by the architecture firm Harris & Shopbell and built in 1908. It is a two-story, rectangular red brick building with an arched entranceway. It features a campanile style tower with a saddleback roof that one housed the station's bells.

It was added to the National Register of Historic Places in 1982.

== Gallery ==
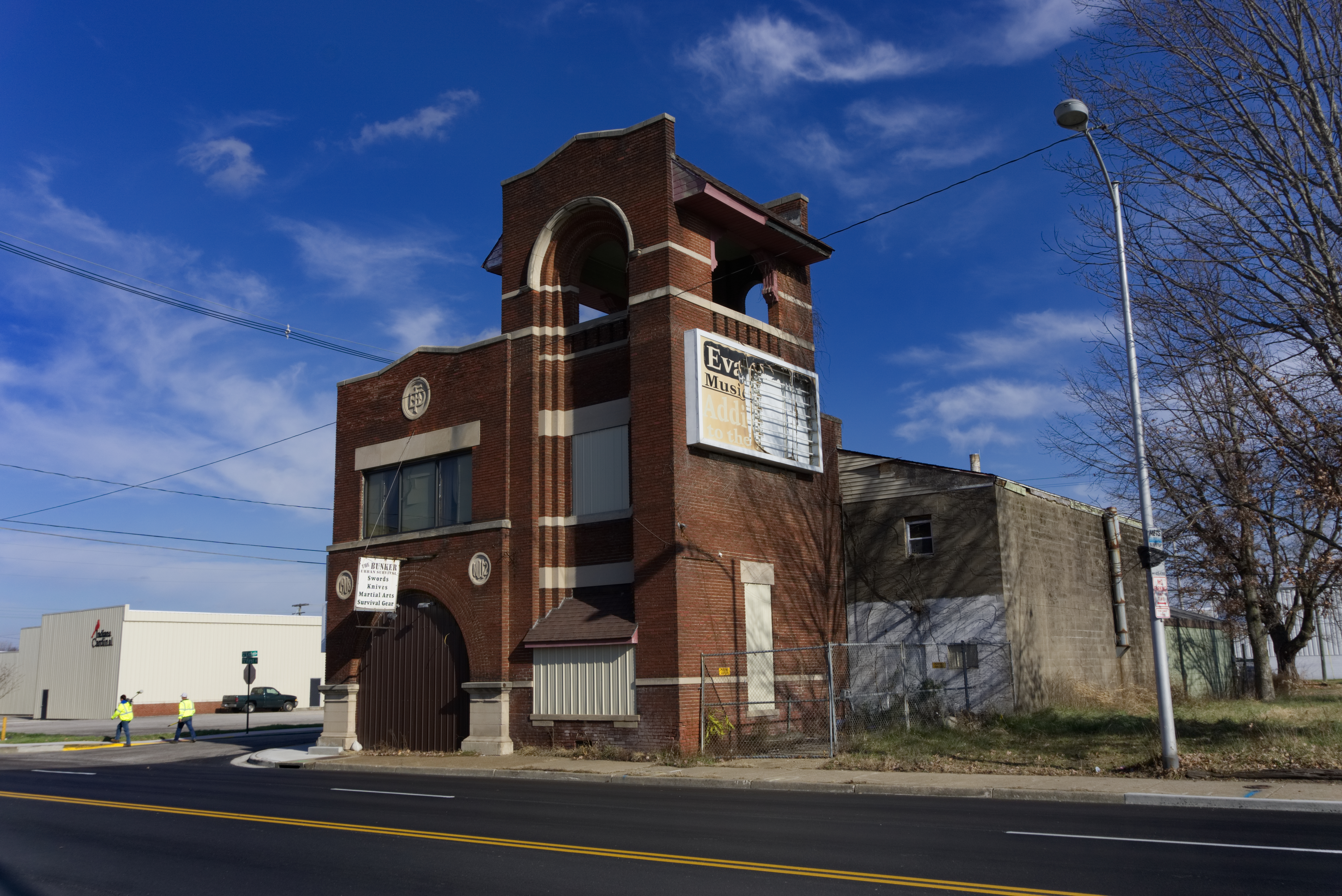
