= Downtown Evansville =

- Central business district
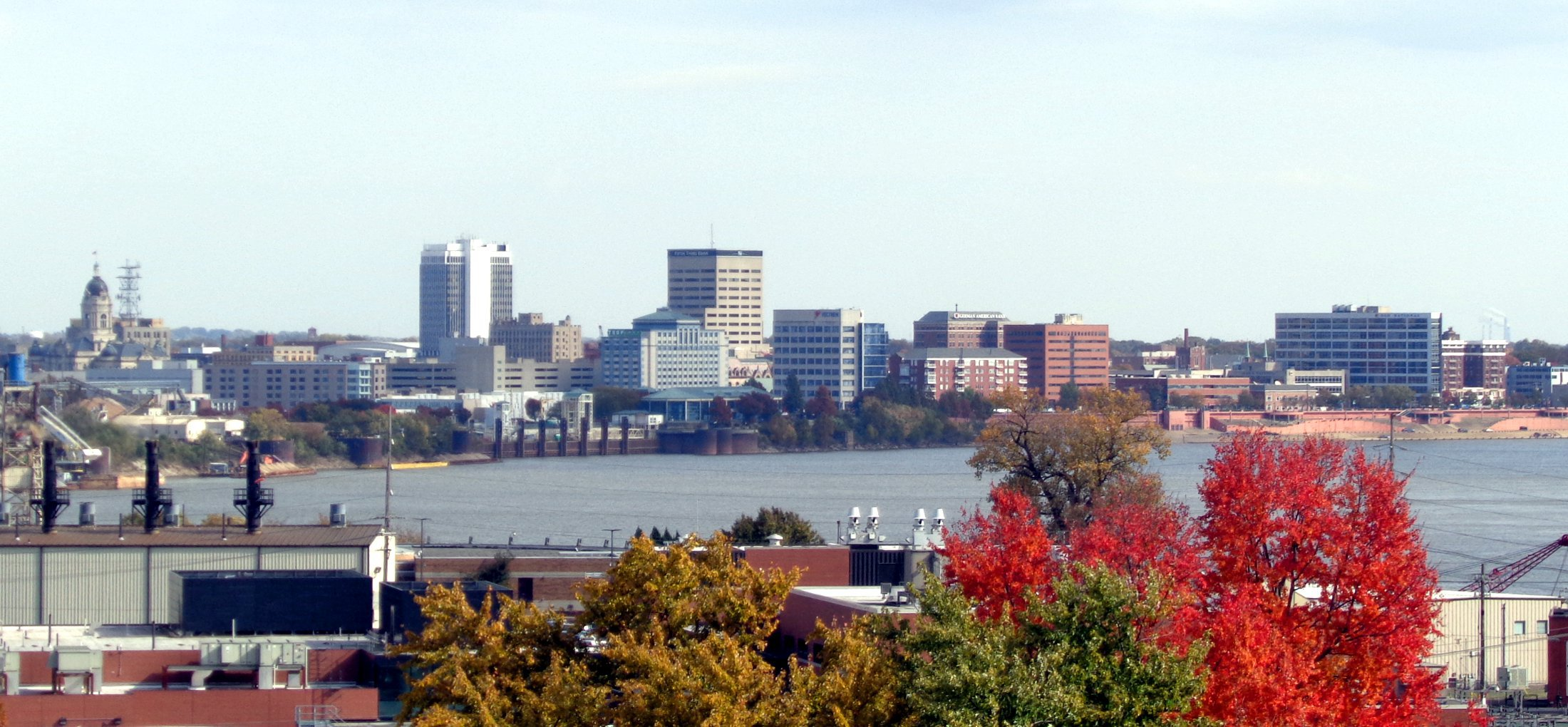
- Downtown Evansville Skyline in October, 2018, from the Port of Evansville
- Interactive map of Downtown Evansville
- Coordinates: 37°58′17.3″N 87°34′5.8″W
- Country: United States
- State: Indiana
- City: Evansville
- Website: www.downtownevansville.com

Downtown Evansville is the central business district of Evansville, Indiana. It is located between Canal Street at the south and east, the Lloyd Expressway to the north, Pigeon Creek to the northwest, and the Ohio River to the southeast south and southwest. Downtown Evansville is entirely within Pigeon Township.

It is home to the Evansville Civic Center. Berry Plastics, CenterPoint Energy, and Old National Bank, the largest financial services bank holding company headquartered in Indiana, have corporate headquarters in downtown Evansville.

== Entertainment venues and attractions ==
Performances can be seen at the Old National Events Plaza and Ford Center, and the Evansville Philharmonic Orchestra plays at the Victory Theatre. The Children's Museum of Evansville, Evansville Museum, and Bally's Evansville are also found in downtown Evansville.

== Other landmarks ==
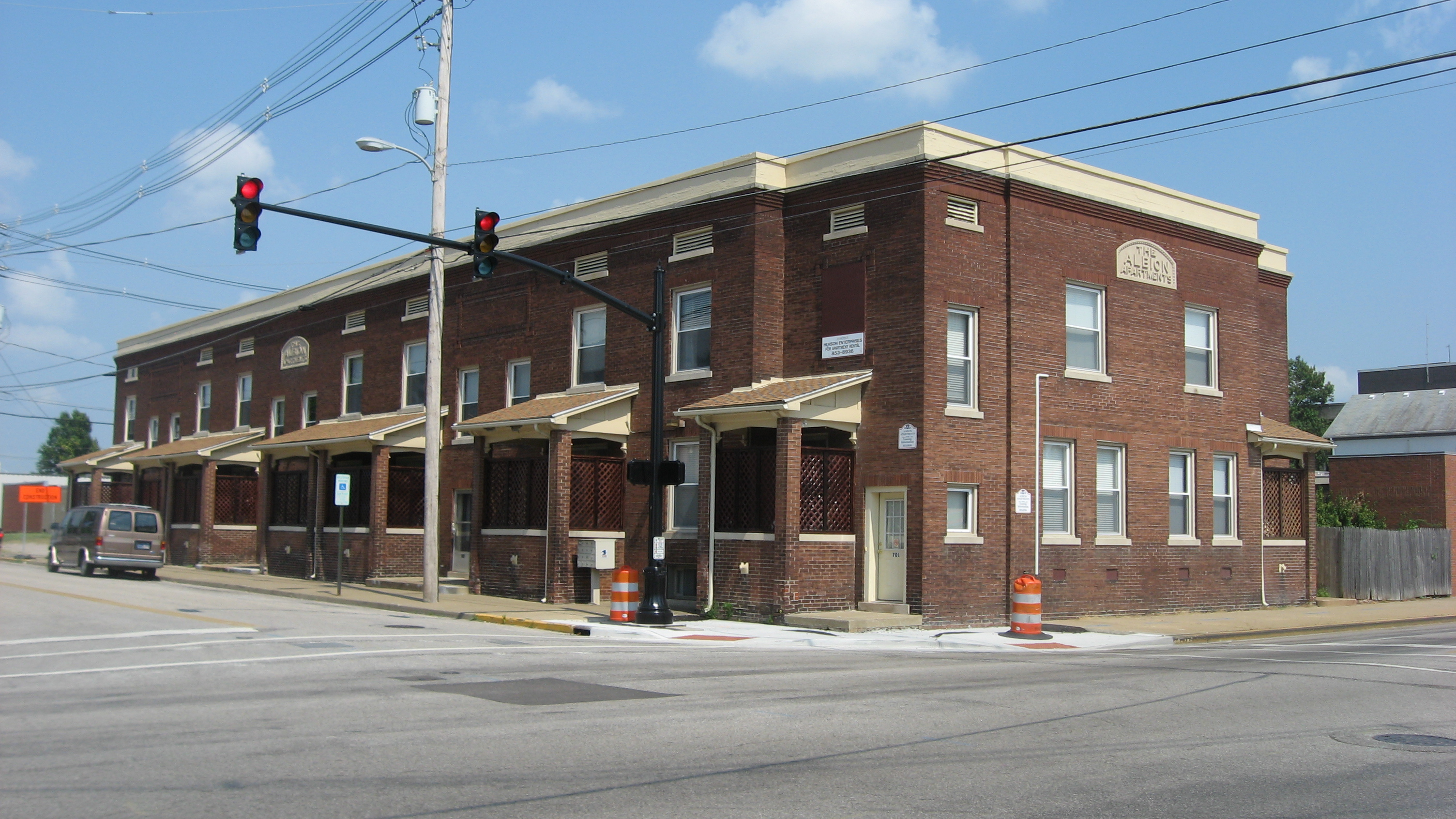
Albion Flats

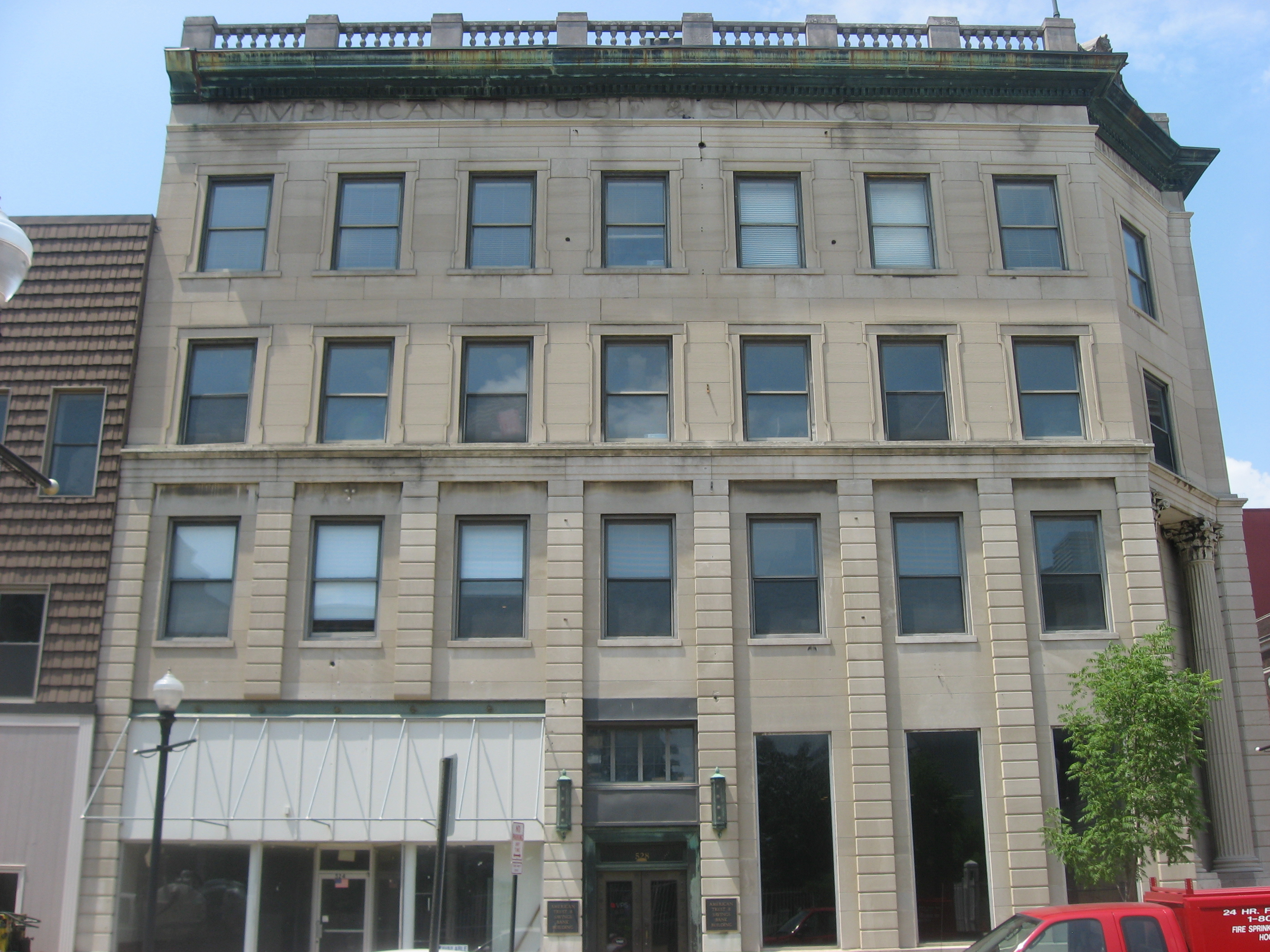
American Trust and Savings Bank

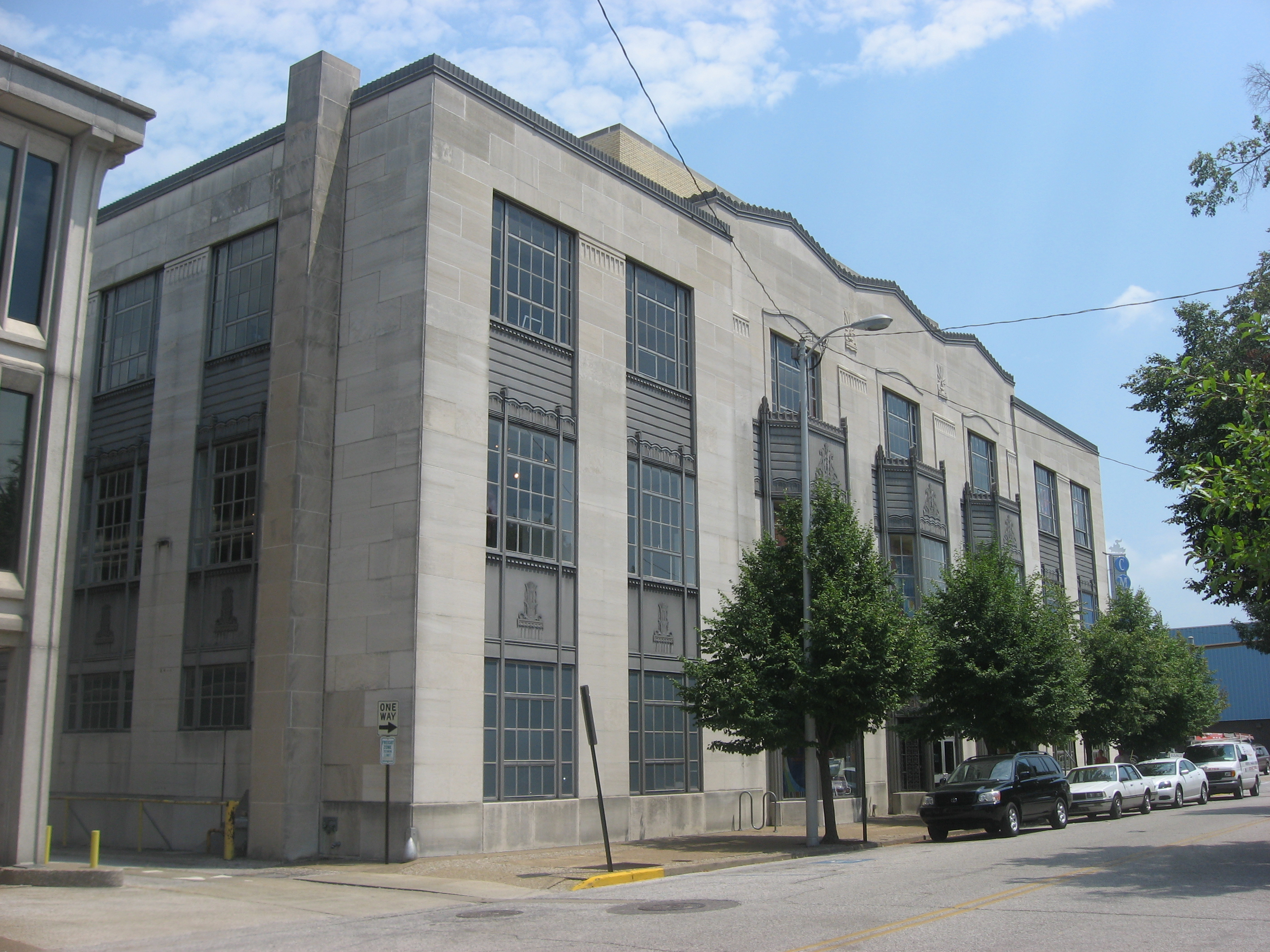
Children's Museum of Evansville

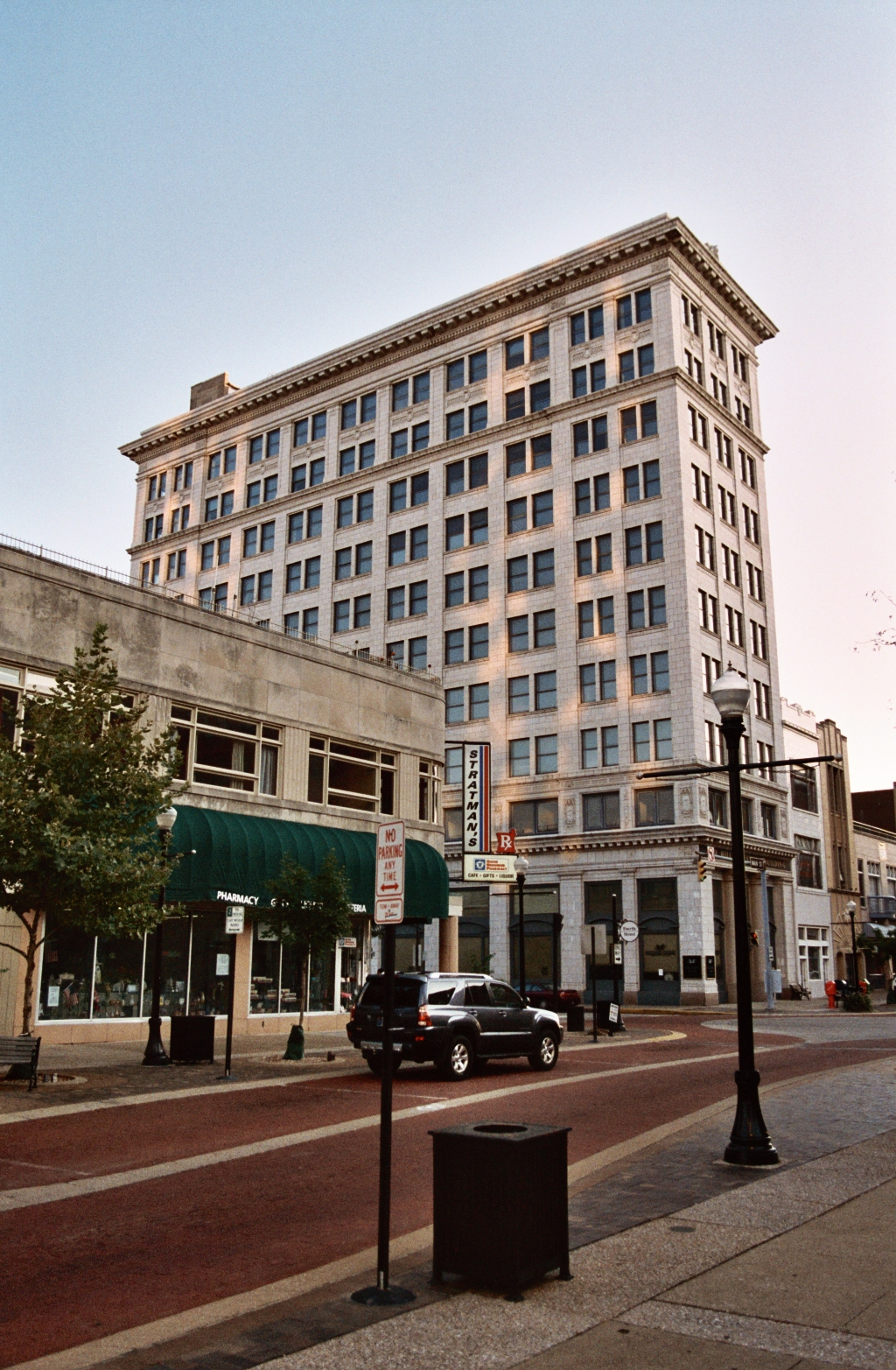
Kunkel Square

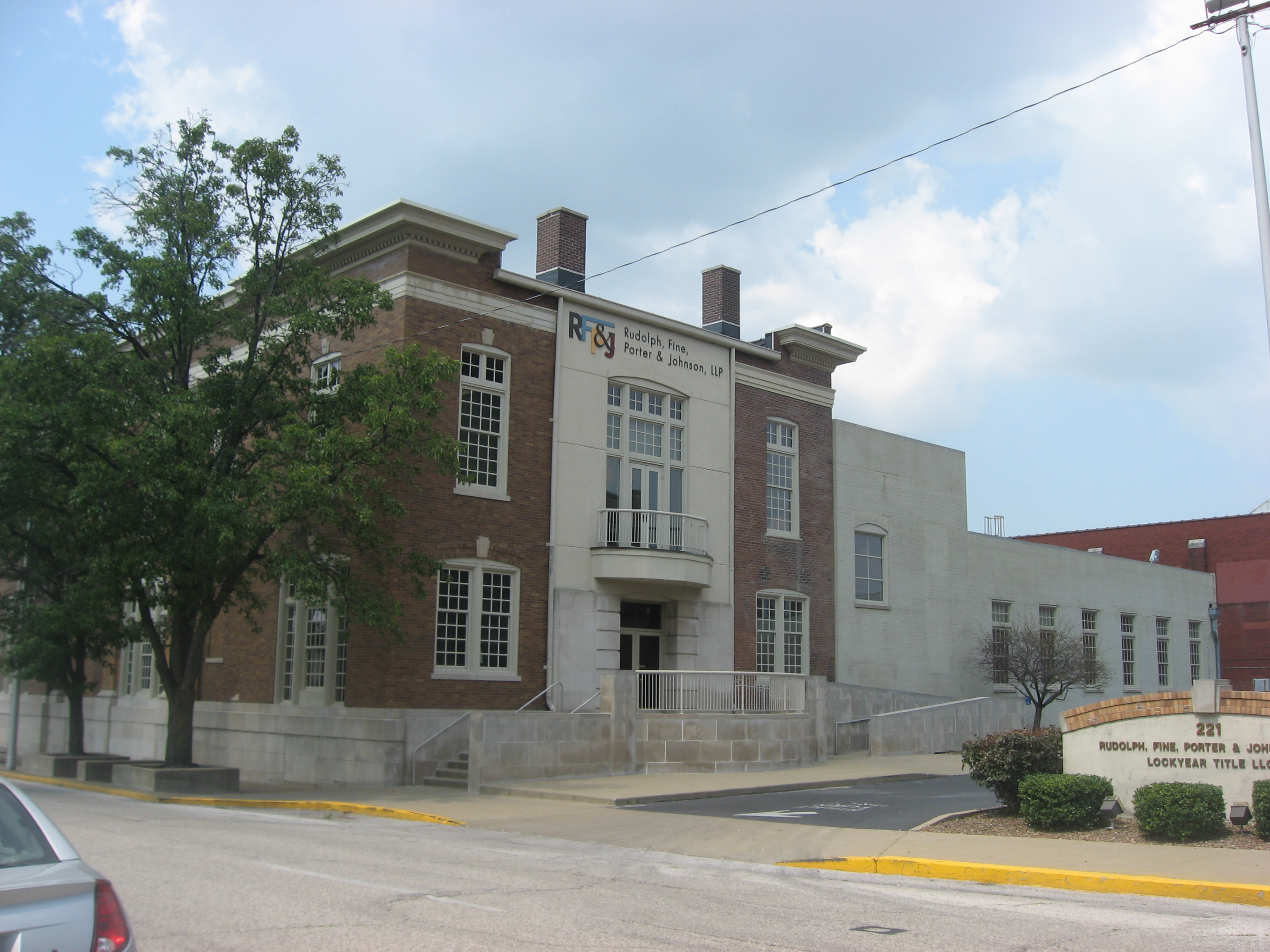
Eagles Home

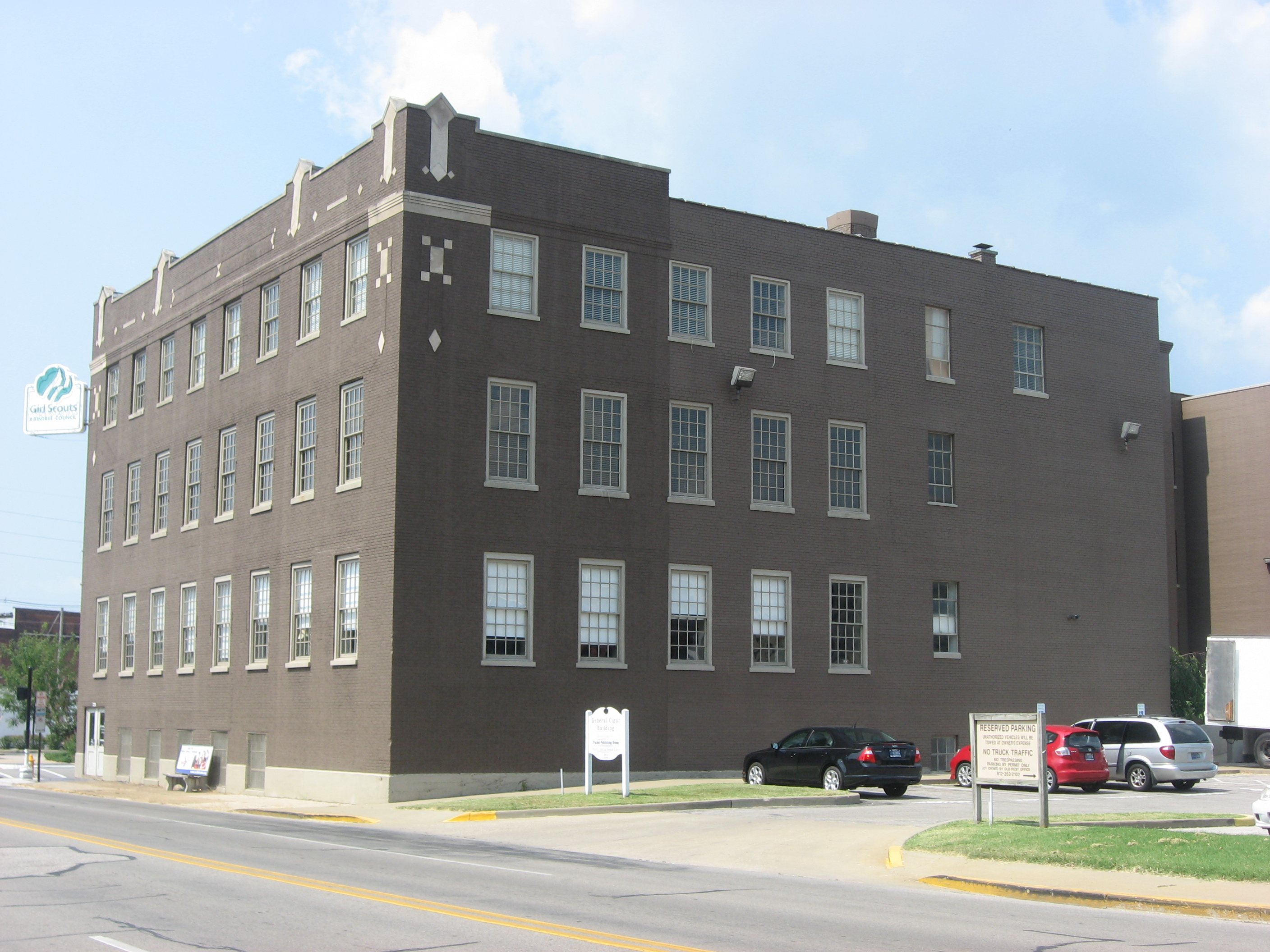
General Cigar Company building

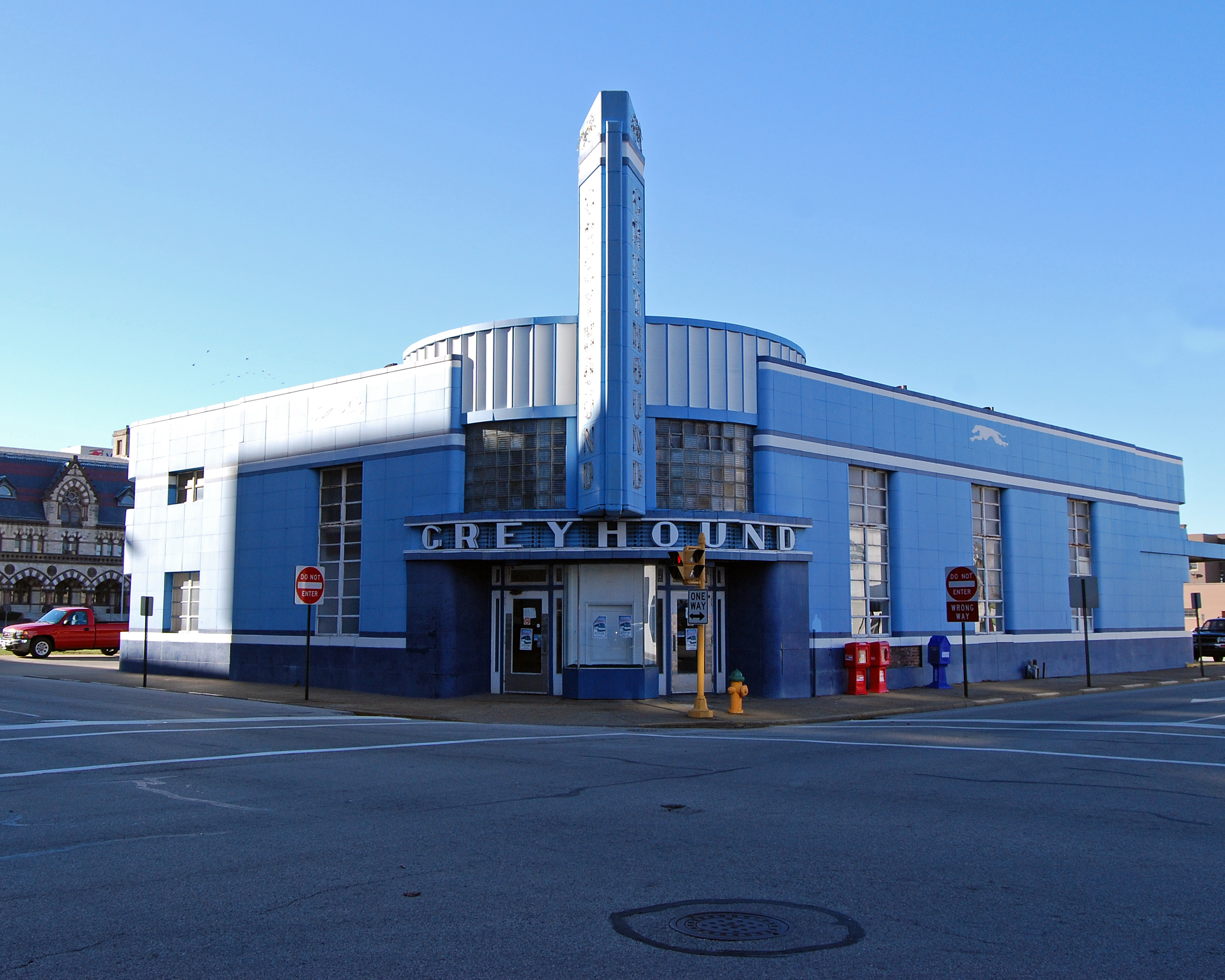
Greyhound Bus Terminal

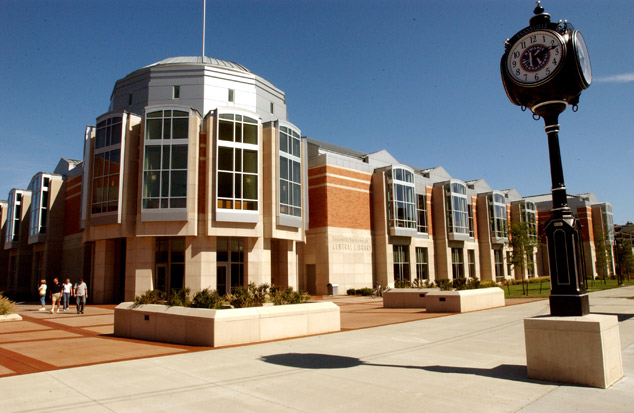
Evansville Vanderburgh Public Library's Central Library

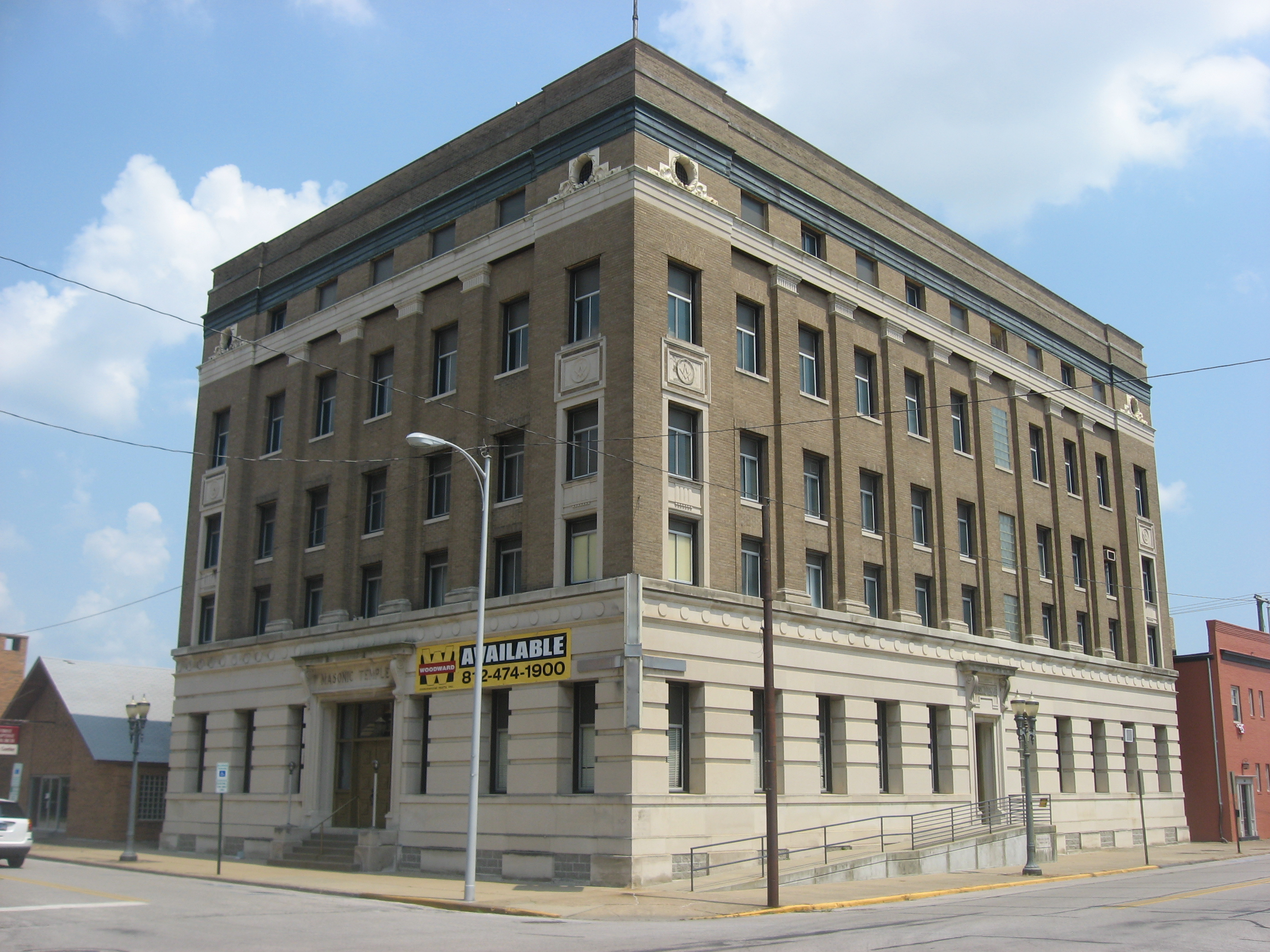
Masonic Temple

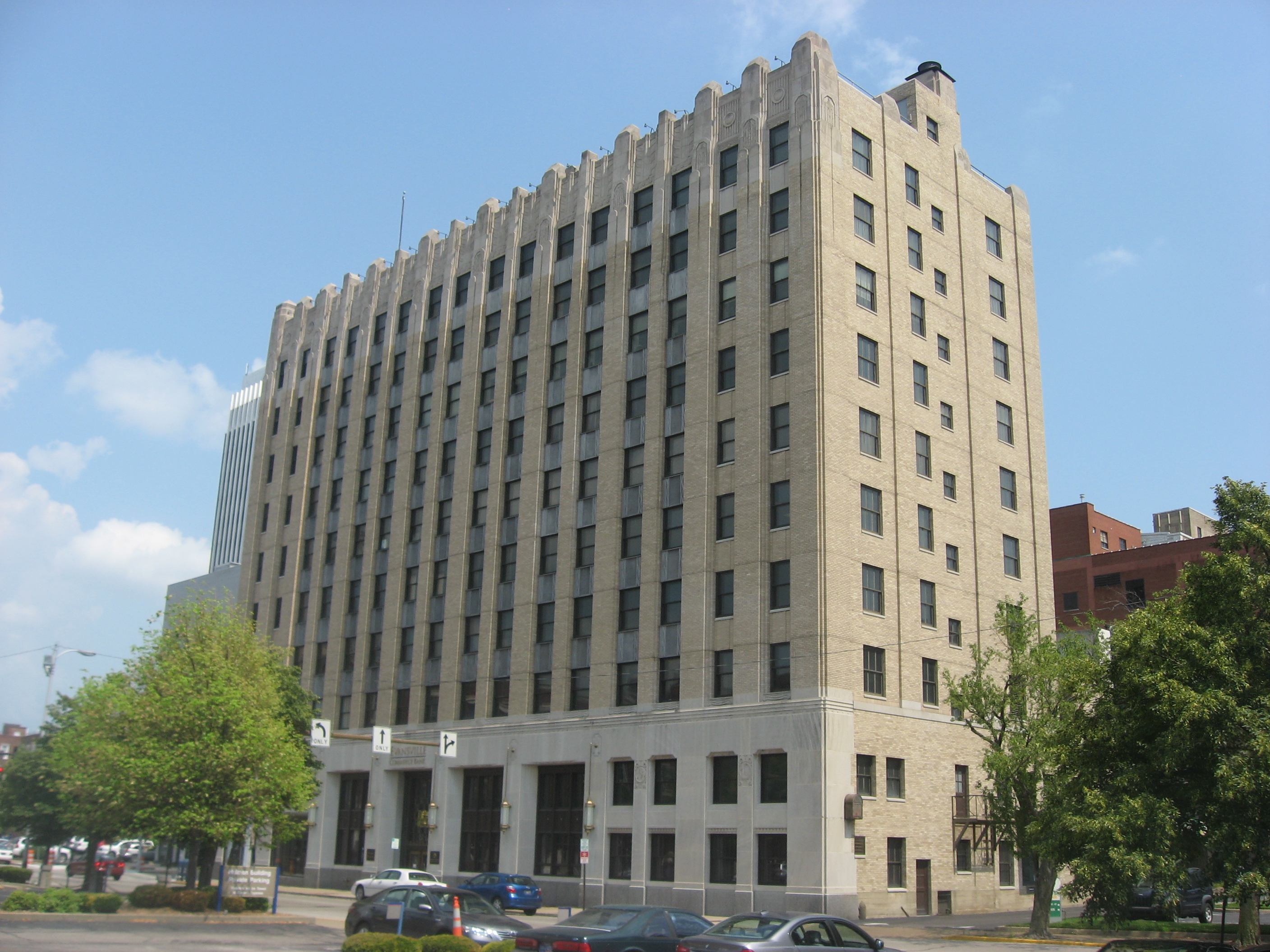
Hulman Building

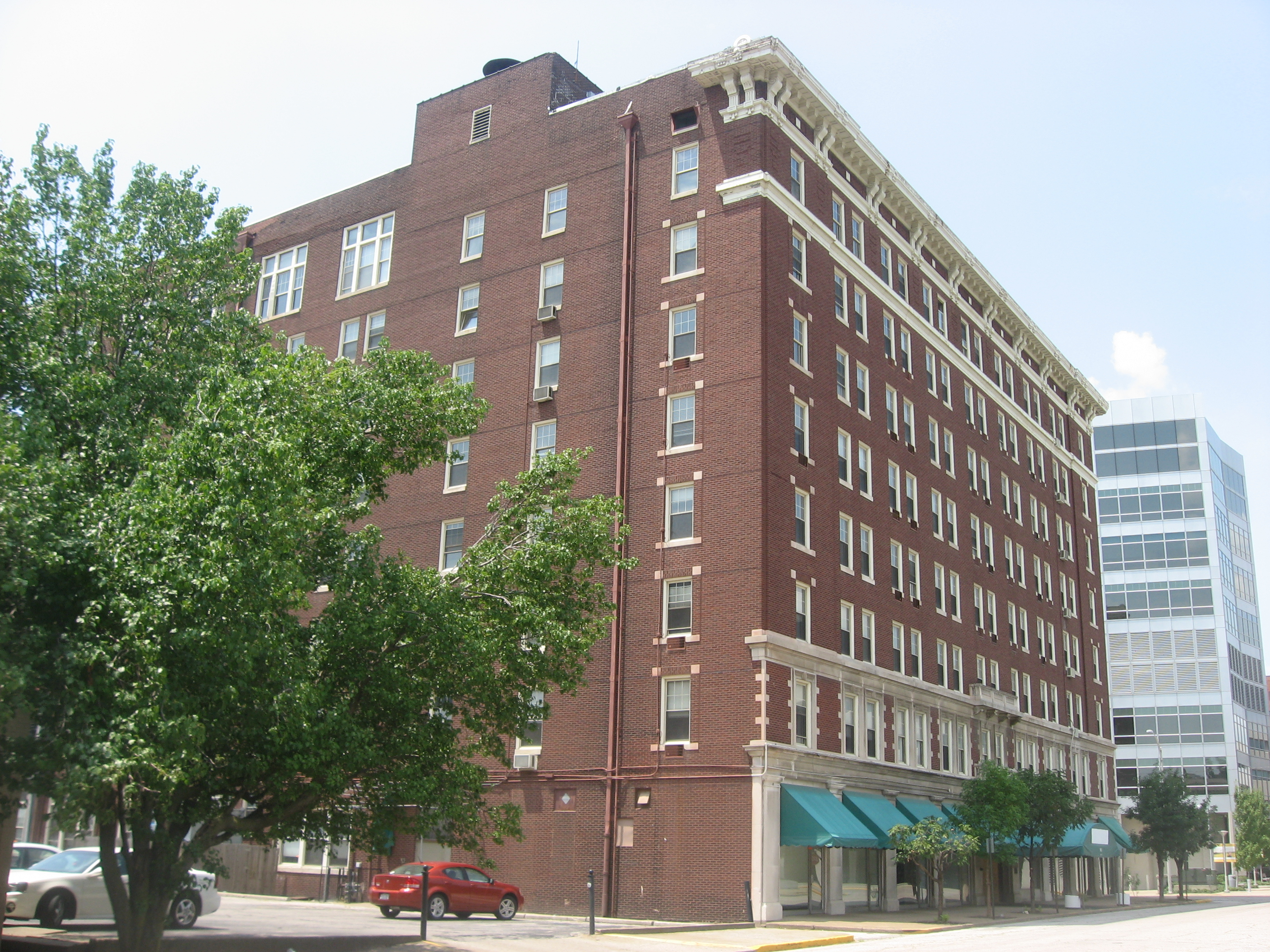
McCurdy Hotel

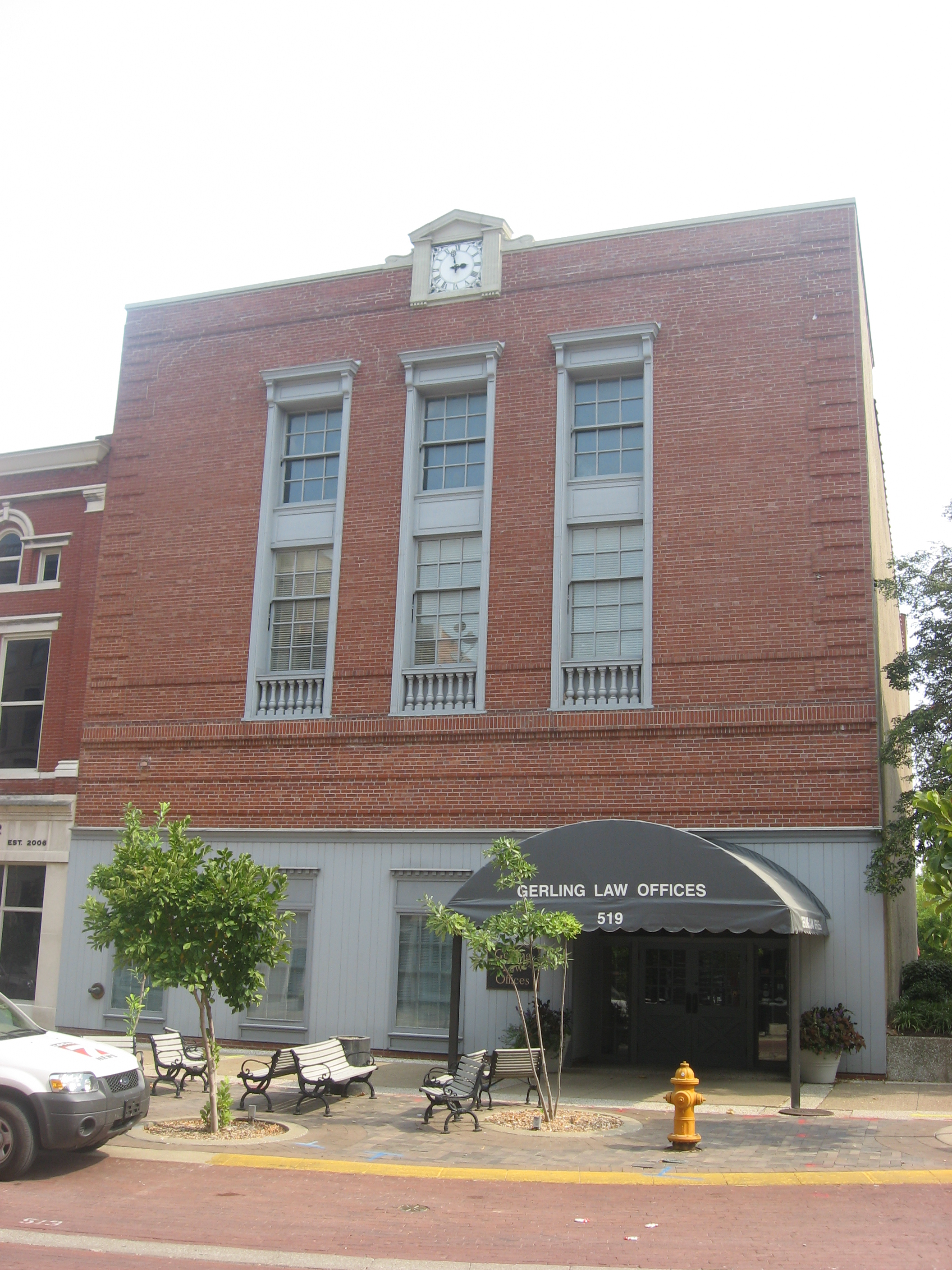
Montgomery Ward Building

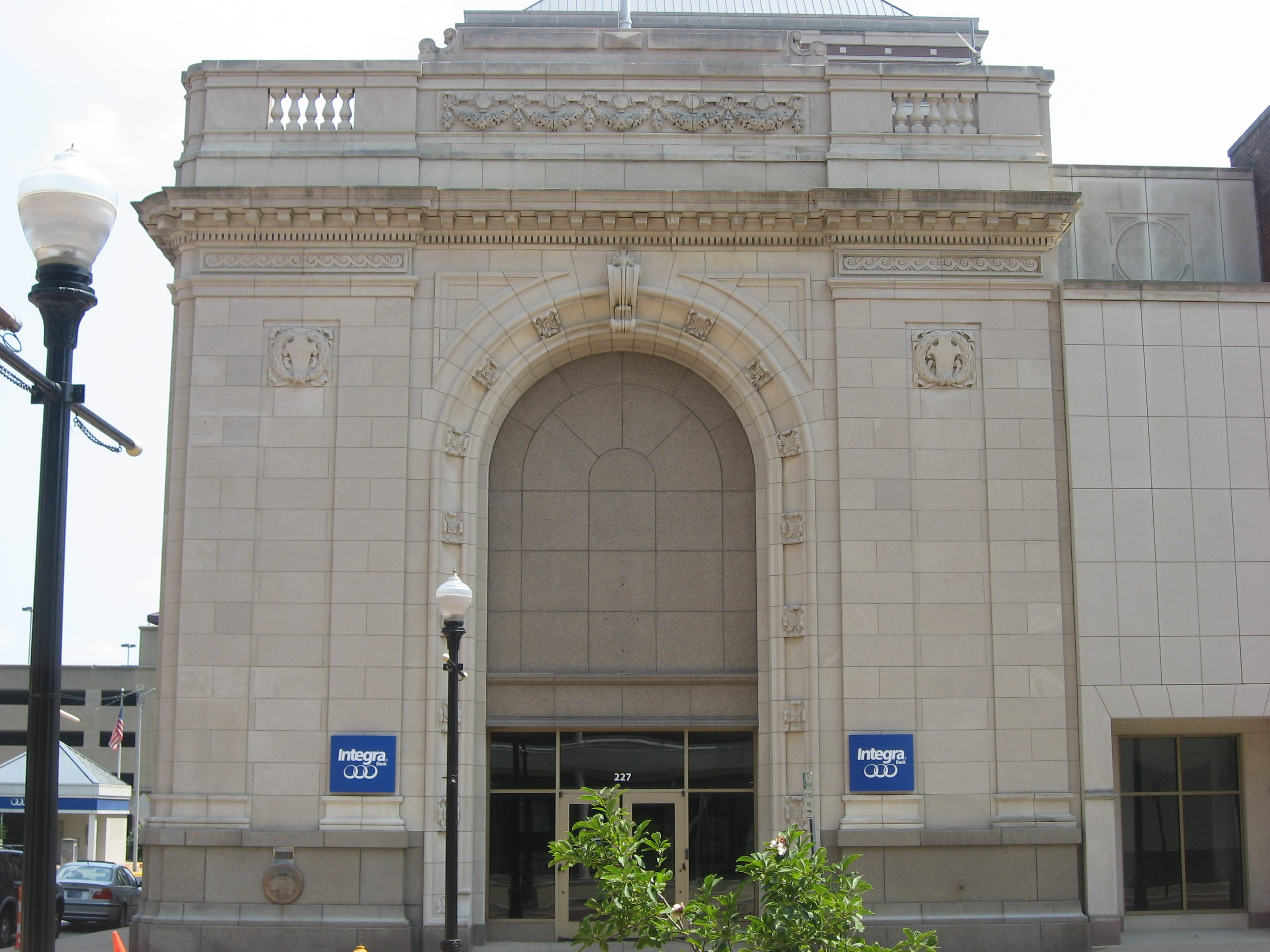
National City Bank Building

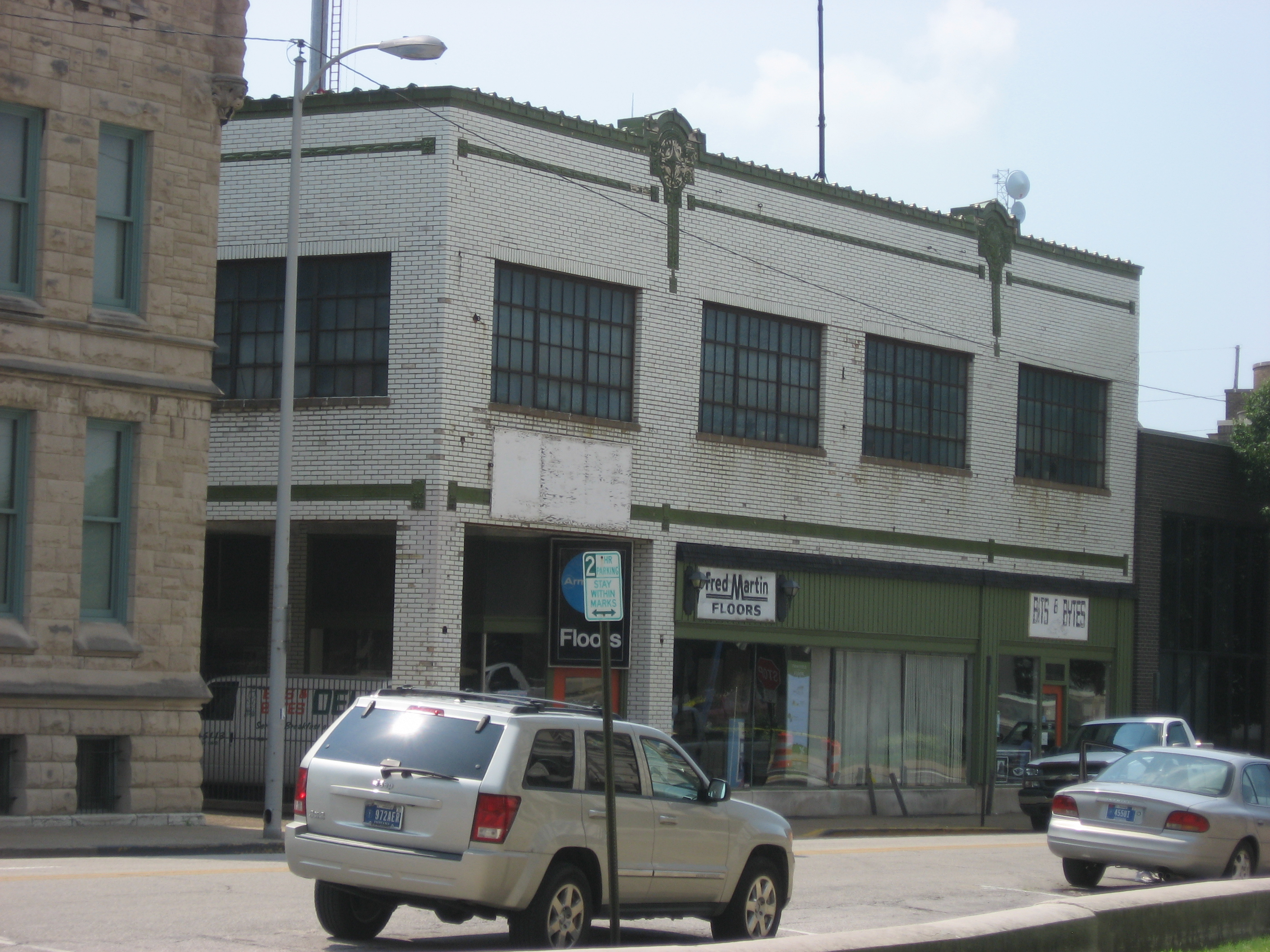
Old Fellwock Auto Company

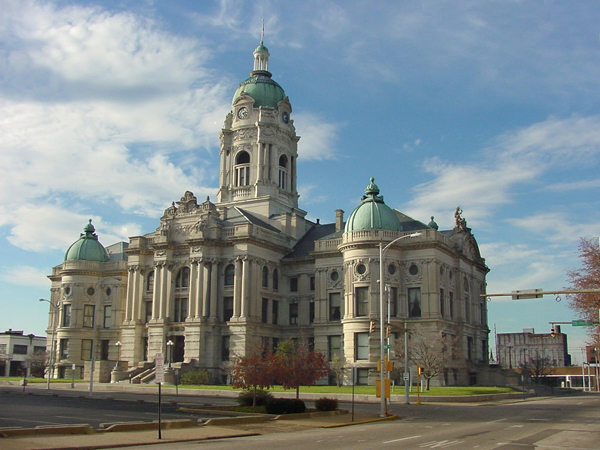
Old Vanderburgh County Courthouse

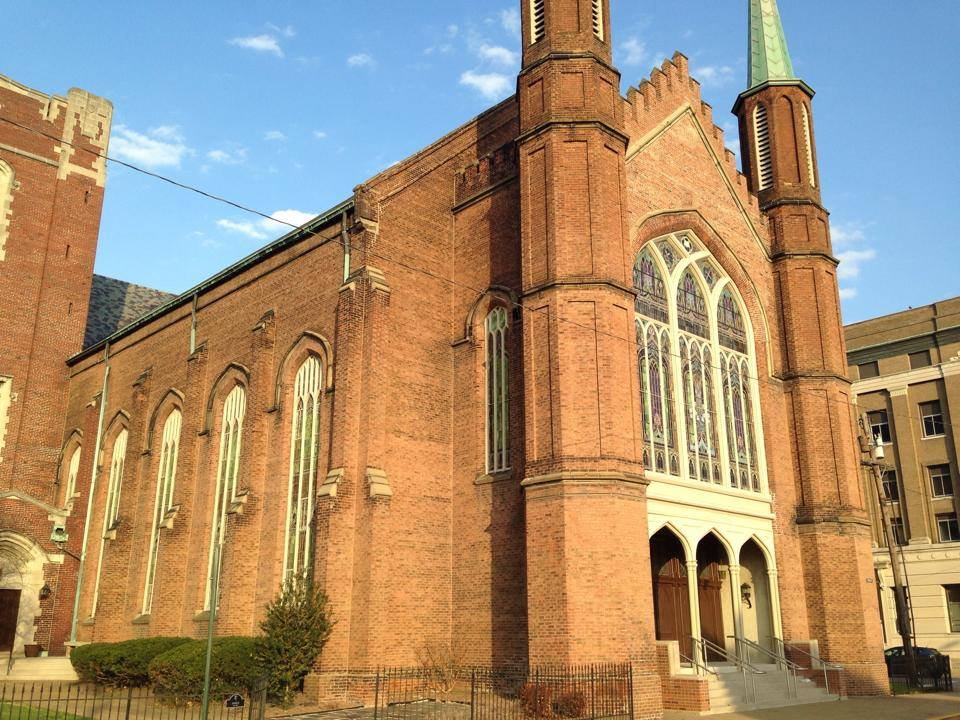
Trinity United Methodist Church
