= Busse House =

Historic house in Indiana, United States

- U.S. National Register of Historic Places
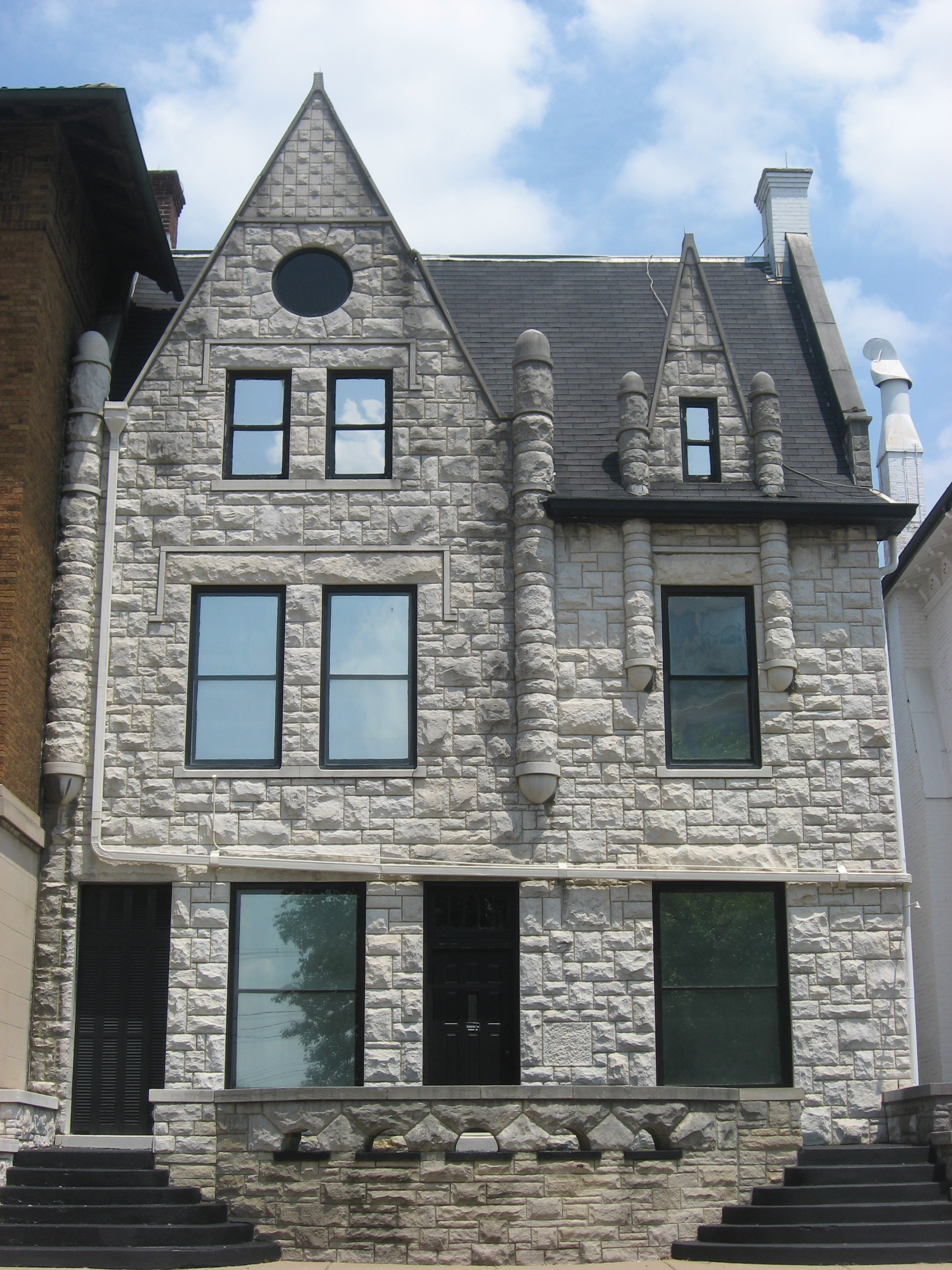
- Busse House, July 2011

- Location within Indiana Location within the United States
- Location: 120 SE 1st St., Evansville, Indiana
- Coordinates: 37°58′8″N 87°34′25″W
- Area: less than one acre
- Built: 1901
- Architect: Harris & Shopbell
- Architectural style: Queen Anne
- MPS: Downtown Evansville MRA
- NRHP reference No.: 82000084
- Added to NRHP: July 1, 1982

Busse House, also known as the Visiting Nurse Association, is a historic home located in downtown Evansville, Indiana. It was designed by the architectural firm Harris & Shopbell and built in 1901 for a prominent local physician. It is a 2 1/2-story, Queen Anne style limestone dwelling. It is located next to the Cadick Apartments.

It was listed on the National Register of Historic Places in 1982.
