= Cadick Apartments =

- Cadick Apartments (Plaza Building)
- U.S. National Register of Historic Places
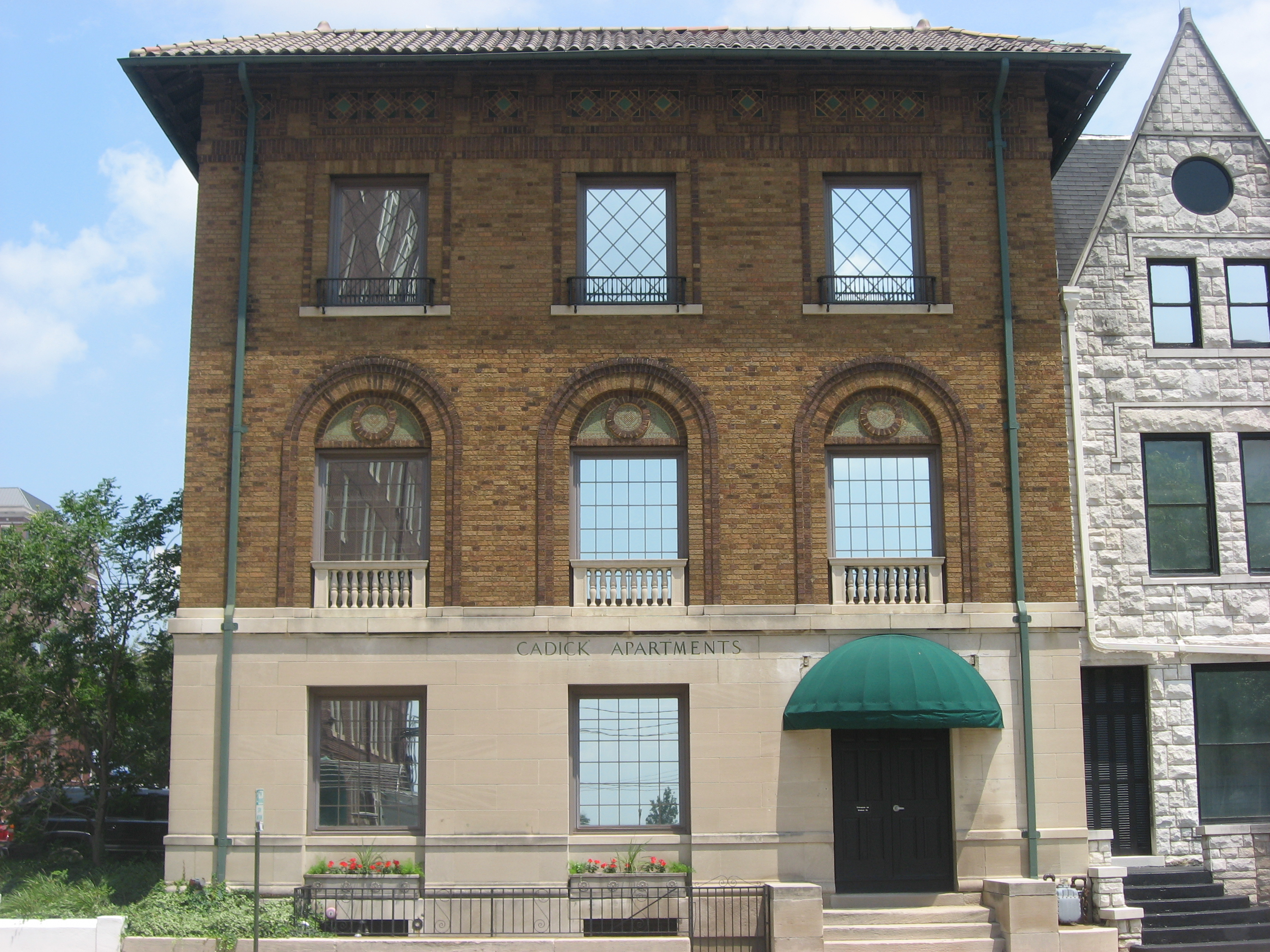
- Cadick Apartments, July 2011

- Location within Indiana Location within the United States
- Location: 118 SE 1st St., Evansville, Indiana
- Coordinates: 37°58′8″N 87°34′24″W
- Area: less than one acre
- Built: 1916
- Architect: Russ, W. Earl; Karges, H. Gilbert
- Architectural style: Beaux Arts
- MPS: Downtown Evansville MRA
- NRHP reference No.: 82000085
- Added to NRHP: July 1, 1982

Cadick Apartments, also known as the Plaza Building, is a historic apartment building located in downtown Evansville, Indiana. It was built in 1916, and is a three-story, Beaux-Arts style brick and limestone building. It is located next to the Busse House.

It was listed on the National Register of Historic Places in 1982.
