= Old Bittermann Building =

- U.S. National Register of Historic Places
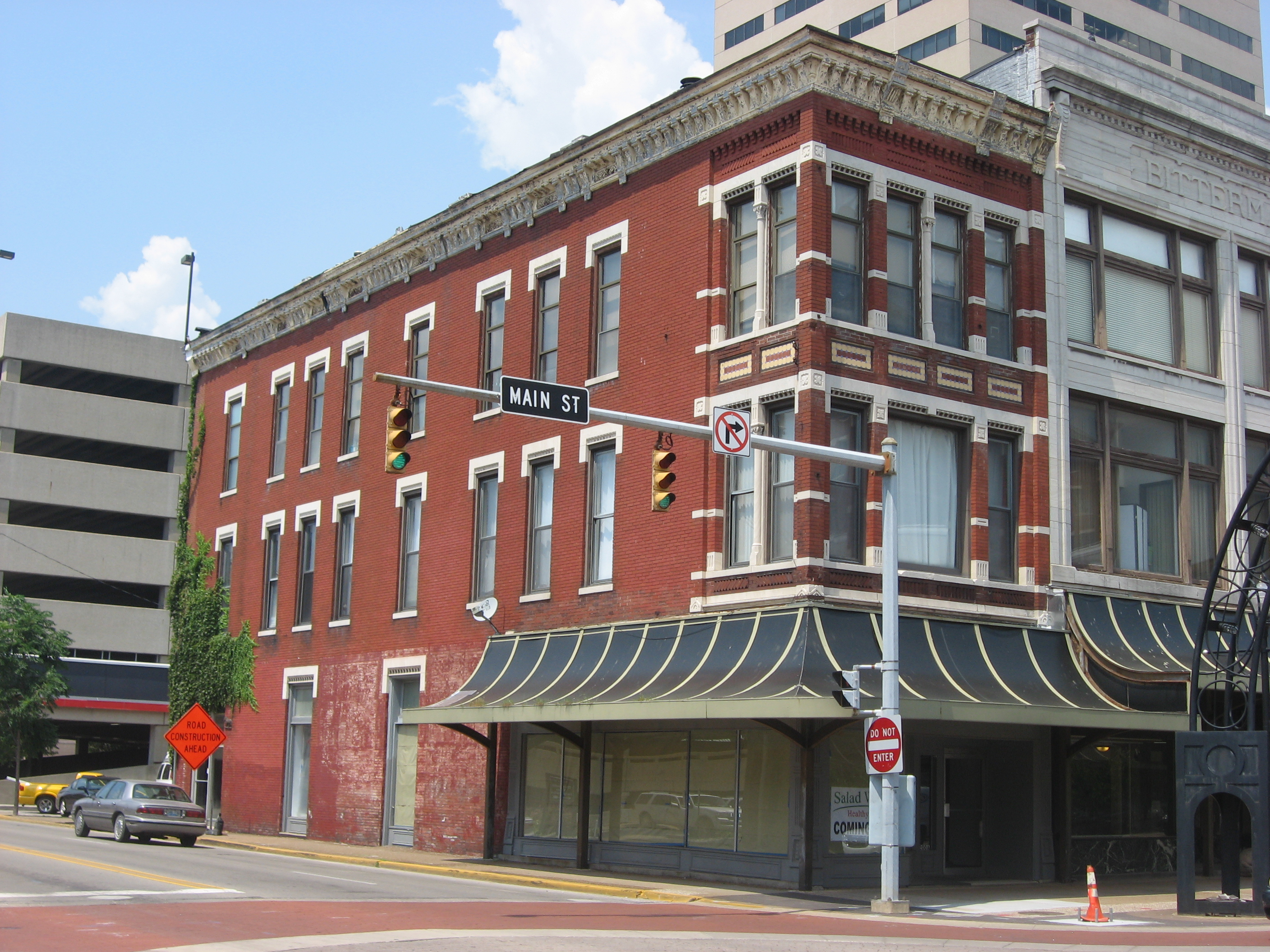
- Old Bittermann Building, July 2011

- Location within Indiana Location within the United States
- Location: 200 Main St., Evansville, Indiana
- Coordinates: 37°58′14″N 87°34′23″W
- Area: less than one acre
- Built: 1885
- Architectural style: Italianate
- NRHP reference No.: 80000070
- Added to NRHP: September 22, 1980

Old Bittermann Building is a historic commercial building located in downtown Evansville, Indiana. It was built in 1885, and is a three-story, rectangular Italianate style brick building. It features a bracketed metal cornice. The building adjoins the Bitterman Building.

It was added to the National Register of Historic Places in 1980.
