= Bitterman Building =

- U.S. National Register of Historic Places
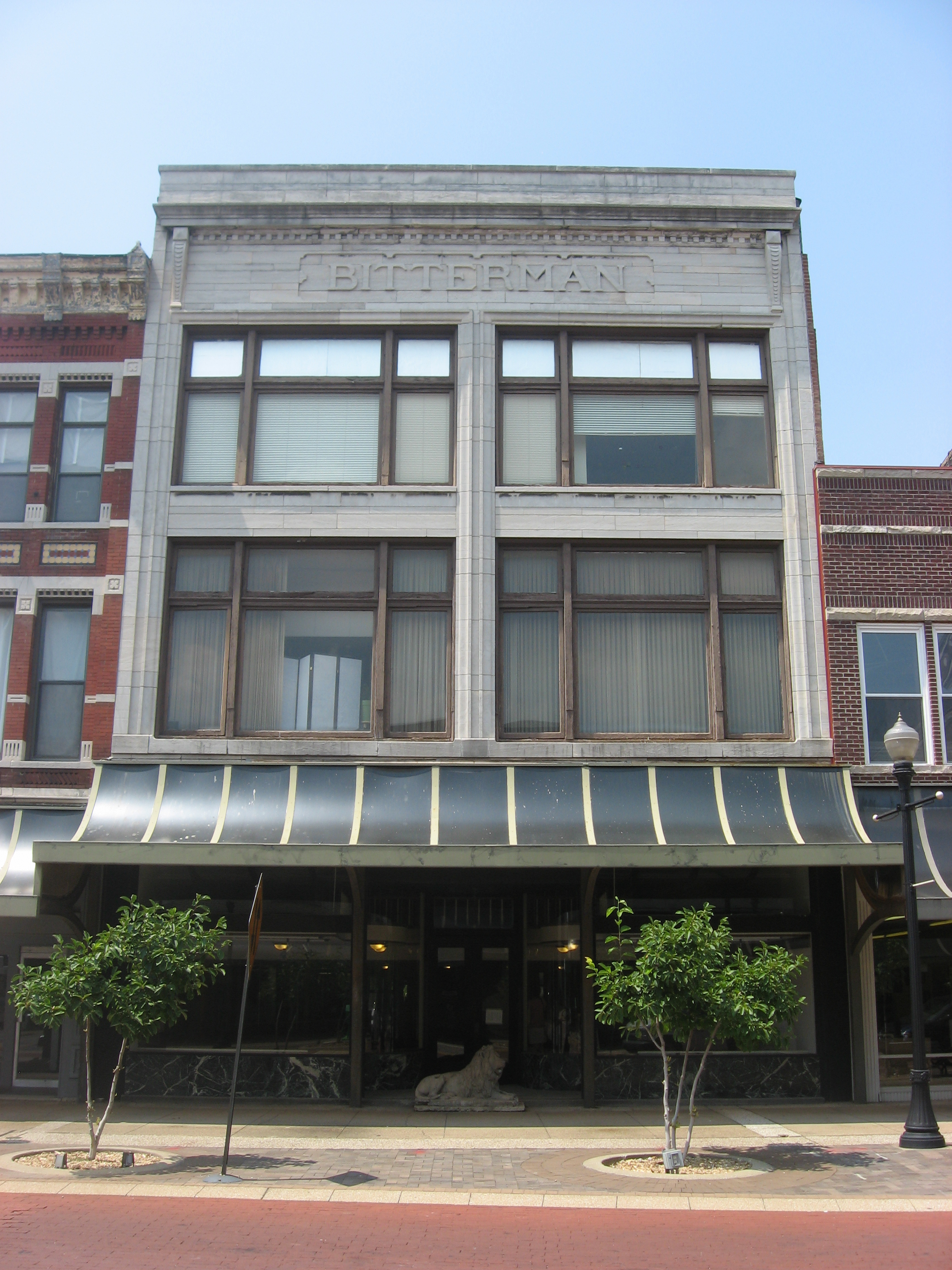
- Bitterman Building, July 2011

- Location within Indiana Location within the United States
- Location: 202-204 Main St., Evansville, Indiana
- Coordinates: 37°58′14″N 87°34′22″W
- Area: less than one acre
- Built: 1923
- Architect: Clifford Shopbell & Co.
- Architectural style: Chicago
- NRHP reference No.: 80000068
- Added to NRHP: September 22, 1980

Bitterman Building, also known as The New Bitterman Building, is a historic commercial building located in downtown Evansville, Indiana. It was designed by the architecture firm Clifford Shopbell & Co. and built in 1923. It is a three-story, rectangular brick building with limestone facing. It features Chicago school style openings. The building adjoins the Old Bittermann Building.

It was added to the National Register of Historic Places in 1980.
