= National Register of Historic Places listings in Marion County, Kentucky =

Location of Marion County in Kentucky

This is a list of the National Register of Historic Places listings in Marion County, Kentucky.

It is intended to be a complete list of the properties on the National Register of Historic Places in Marion County, Kentucky, United States. The locations of National Register properties for which the latitude and longitude coordinates are included below, may be seen in a map.

There are 12 properties listed on the National Register in the county.

This National Park Service list is complete through NPS recent listings posted March 21, 2025.

== Current listings ==
	Name on the Register	Image	Date listed	Location	City or town	Description
1	Bradfordsville Christian Church	Bradfordsville Christian Church	October 25, 2010 (#09001141)	101 E. Main St. 37°29′39″N 85°08′59″W	Bradfordsville	
2	Burks' Distillery	Burks' Distillery	December 31, 1974 (#74000893)	East of Loretto off Kentucky Routes 49 and 52; 37°38′48″N 85°21′03″W	Loretto	Now the Maker's Mark Distillery
3	Gravel Switch Historic District		January 22, 2014 (#12001201)	Along Kentucky Route 243, E. Railroad Ave., and Aliceton Rd. 37°34′43″N 85°03′06″W	Gravel Switch	
4	Lebanon Historic Commercial District	Lebanon Historic Commercial District	November 10, 1987 (#87000857)	Main St. roughly between Proctor Knott and Spalding Aves. 37°34′10″N 85°15′10″W	Lebanon	
5	Lebanon Junior High School and Lebanon High School	Lebanon Junior High School and Lebanon High School	March 31, 2000 (#00000270)	Junction of N. Spalding and Hood Aves. 37°34′19″N 85°15′11″W	Lebanon	
6	Lebanon National Cemetery	Lebanon National Cemetery	June 5, 1975 (#75000801)	1 mile southwest of Lebanon off Kentucky Route 208; 37°33′12″N 85°16′06″W	Lebanon	
7	Loretto Motherhouse	Loretto Motherhouse	April 2, 1980 (#80001653)	Off Kentucky Route 152; 37°39′49″N 85°23′53″W	Nerinx	
8	Capt. Andrew Offutt Monument	Capt. Andrew Offutt Monument	July 17, 1997 (#97000680)	Ryder Cemetery, east of Lebanon, off U.S. Route 68; 37°34′24″N 85°14′30″W	Lebanon	
9	Clel Purdom House		February 11, 2016 (#16000009)	7075 Danville Highway; 37°34′31″N 85°09′22″W	Lebanon	
10	St. Joseph Church		October 25, 2010 (#09001142)	3300 St. Joe Rd. 37°31′20″N 85°23′22″W	Raywick	
11	St. Mary's College Historic District		April 10, 1980 (#80001654)	South of St. Mary; 37°34′12″N 85°20′41″W	St. Mary	
12	Leonard A. Spalding House	Leonard A. Spalding House	April 3, 1991 (#91000367)	307 E. Main St. 37°34′18″N 85°14′55″W	Lebanon	

== See also ==
- List of National Historic Landmarks in Kentucky
- National Register of Historic Places listings in Kentucky
