= Lebanon Historic District =

Lebanon Historic District and variations may refer to:

in the United States

(by state then city)

- Lebanon Green Historic District, Lebanon, Connecticut, listed on the National Register of Historic Places (NRHP) in New London County
- Lebanon Historic District (Lebanon, Illinois), NRHP-listed
- Lebanon Historic Commercial District (Lebanon, Kentucky), listed on the NRHP in Marion County
- Lebanon Junction Historic District, Lebanon Junction, Kentucky, listed on the NRHP in Bullitt County
- West Lebanon Historic District, listed on the NRHP in York County
- New Lebanon Historic District, New Lebanon, Missouri, listed on the NRHP in Cooper County
- Lebanon Historic District (New Jersey), listed on the NRHP in Hunterdon County
- Lebanon Commercial District (Lebanon, Ohio), a historic district listed on the NRHP in Warren County
- Lebanon Commercial Historic District (Lebanon, Tennessee), NRHP-listed

== See also ==
- Cedars of Lebanon State Park Historic District, Lebanon, Tennessee, NRHP-listed
- Lebanon Commercial Historic District (disambiguation)
