= Kentucky Route 2154 =

Highway in Marion County, Kentucky

Kentucky Route 2154
- Marion County Veterans Memorial Highway
- KY 2154 highlighted in red

Route information
- Maintained by KYTC
- Length: 6.821 mi (10.977 km)

Major junctions
- North end: US 68
- KY 55; KY 49
- South end: KY 208

Location
- Country: United States
- State: Kentucky
- Counties: Marion

Highway system
- Kentucky State Highway System; Interstate; US; State; Parkways
← KY 2153	→ KY 2155

Kentucky Route 2154 (KY 2154) is a 6.8-mile-long (10.9 km) partial beltway around the city of Lebanon. With the exclusion of a short overlap (concurrency) with KY 55, it is entirely an at-grade two-lane highway throughout. For the majority of its length, it is known as Marion County Veterans Memorial Highway.

== Route description ==
The highway begins at a junction with U.S. Route 68 (US 68). It then follows KY 55 for 1,250 feet (380 m) The highway then breaks away from KY 55. Next the highway junctions with KY 429, and the highway then turns into a south direction forming a four-way junction with KY 49 just east from the ending of KY 84. The highway then intersects US 68. The highway then ends at a junction with KY 208.

== Major intersections ==
The entire route is in Marion County.

Location	mi	km	Destinations	Notes
	0.0	0.0	KY 208 (New Calvary Road) – Calvary, Lebanon	Southern terminus; road continues east as Industrial Drive
	0.9	1.4	US 68 (W Main Street / Campbellsville Road) – Campbellsville, Springfield	
Lebanon	2.1	3.4	KY 49 (Loretto Road (KY 52)) to KY 84 – Loretto, St. Mary, Lebanon	
	3.3	5.3	KY 429 (St Rose Road)	
Lebanon	4.1	6.6	KY 55 north (Springfield Road) – Springfield	Southern end of KY 55 concurrency
Lebanon	4.4	7.1	KY 55 south (N Spalding Avenue) – Lebanon, Campbellsville	Northern end of wrong-way KY 55 concurrency
Lebanon	6.821	10.977	US 68 (E Main Street / Danville Highway (KY 52)) – Lebanon, Perryville	Northern terminus; road continues as Sulphur Springs Road
1.000 mi = 1.609 km; 1.000 km = 0.621 mi: Concurrency terminus
