= 2014–15 Kentucky Wildcats women's basketball team =

Intercollegiate basketball season

2014–15 Kentucky Wildcats women's basketball

Paradise Jam Tournament Reef Division champions

NCAA tournament, second round
- Conference: Southeastern Conference

Ranking
- Coaches: No. 11
- AP: No. 11
- Record: 24–10 (10–6 SEC)
- Head coach: Matthew Mitchell (8th season)
- Assistant coaches: Adeniyi Amadou; Christian Stefanopoulos; Tamika Williams
- Home arena: Memorial Coliseum; Rupp Arena

2014–15 SEC women's basketball standings
	Conf.				Overall
Team	W		L	PCT	W		L	PCT
No. 3 South Carolina*^{†}	15	–	1	.938	34	–	3	.919
No. 6 Tennessee	15	–	1	.938	30	–	6	.833
No. 12 Mississippi State	11	–	5	.688	27	–	7	.794
No. 11 Kentucky	10	–	6	.625	24	–	10	.706
No. 21 Texas A&M	10	–	6	.625	23	–	10	.697
LSU	10	–	6	.625	17	–	14	.548
Missouri	7	–	9	.438	19	–	14	.576
Ole Miss	7	–	9	.438	19	–	14	.576
Georgia	6	–	10	.375	19	–	12	.613
Arkansas	6	–	10	.375	18	–	14	.563
Vanderbilt	5	–	11	.313	15	–	16	.484
Florida	5	–	11	.313	13	–	17	.433
Auburn	3	–	13	.188	13	–	18	.419
Alabama	2	–	14	.125	13	–	19	.406
† 2015 SEC tournament winner Rankings from AP poll

The 2014–15 Kentucky Wildcats women's basketball team represented the University of Kentucky during the 2014–15 NCAA Division I women's basketball season. The Wildcats, led by eighth-year head coach Matthew Mitchell, played their home games at the Memorial Coliseum, with one game at Rupp Arena and were members of the Southeastern Conference. They finished the season 24–10, 10–6 in SEC play to finish in a three-way tie for fourth place. They advanced to the semifinals of the SEC women's tournament, where they lost to Tennessee. They received an at-large bid to the NCAA women's tournament, where they defeated Tennessee State in the first before being upset by Dayton in the second round.

== Roster ==
2014–15 Kentucky Wildcats women's basketball team
Players
Coaches

Pos.	#	Name	Height	Year	Previous school	Hometown
G	0	Jennifer O'Neill	5 ft 6 in (1.68 m)	Sr	Saint Michael Academy	Bronx, NY
C	2	Ivana Jakubcova	6 ft 11 in (2.11 m)	Jr	Murray State (OK)	Bratislava, Slovakia
G	3	Janee Thompson (injured)	5 ft 7 in (1.7 m)	Jr	Whitney Young	Chicago, IL
F	5	Kyvin Goodin-Rogers	6 ft 1 in (1.85 m)	So	Marion County	Lebanon, KY
F/C	12	Jelleah Sidney	6 ft 2 in (1.88 m)	Sr	Saint Michael Academy/Chipola JC	Queens Village, NY
G	13	Bria Goss	5 ft 10 in (1.78 m)	Sr	Ben Davis	Indianapolis, IN
G	15	Linnae Harper	5 ft 8 in (1.73 m)	So	Whitney Young	Chicago, IL
G	24	Jaycee Coe	5 ft 11 in (1.8 m)	Fr	Jackson County	Gainesboro, TN
G	25	Makayla Epps	5 ft 10 in (1.78 m)	So	Marion County	Lebanon, KY
F/C	35	Alexis Jennings	6 ft 2 in (1.88 m)	Fr	Sparkman	Madison, AL
C	45	Alyssa Rice	6 ft 3 in (1.91 m)	Fr	Reynoldsburg	Reynoldsburg, OH
F/C	50	Azia Bishop	6 ft 3 in (1.91 m)	Sr	Start	Toledo, OH

Head coach

Matthew Mitchell

Assistant coach(es)

Adeniyi Amadou
Christian Stefanopoulos
Tamika Williams

Legend

- (C) Team captain
- (S) Suspended
- (I) Ineligible
- (W) Walk-on
- Injured
- Current redshirt

Roster
Last update: done

== Schedule ==
Date time, TV	Rank^{#}	Opponent^{#}	Result	Record	Site (attendance) city, state
Exhibition
Nov 6, 2014*; 7:00 p.m.	No. 11	Pikeville	W 141–63	–	Memorial Coliseum (1,229); Lexington, KY
Non-conference regular season
Nov 14, 2014*; 7:00 p.m.	No. 11	Appalachian State	W 111–74	1–0	Memorial Coliseum (4,887); Lexington, KY
Nov 17, 2014*; 7:00 p.m., ESPN2	No. 13	No. 8 Baylor	W 74–64	2–0	Rupp Arena (22,075); Lexington, KY
Nov 19, 2014*; 11:00 a.m.	No. 13	Morehead State	W 91–62	3–0	Memorial Coliseum (5,923); Lexington, KY
Nov 22, 2014*; 8:00 p.m., ESPN3	No. 13	at Central Michigan	W 71–68	4–0	McGuirk Arena (2,361); Mount Pleasant, MI
Nov 27, 2014*; 6:00 p.m.	No. 9	vs. Illinois; Paradise Jam tournament	L 71–77	4–1	Sports and Fitness Center (N/A); Saint Thomas, USVI
Nov 28, 2014*; 6:00 p.m.	No. 9	vs. Oklahoma; Paradise Jam Tournament	W 92–88 ^{OT}	5–1	Sports and Fitness Center (N/A); Saint Thomas, USVI
Nov 29, 2014*; 8:15 p.m.	No. 9	vs. South Florida; Paradise Jam Tournament	W 61–57	6–1	Sports and Fitness Center (2,347); Saint Thomas, USVI
Dec 3, 2014*; 7:00 p.m.	No. 13	Northern Kentucky	W 82–64	7–1	Memorial Coliseum (4,615); Lexington, KY
Dec 7, 2014*; 2:00 p.m., ESPN3	No. 13	at No. 7 Louisville; The Battle for the Bluegrass	W 77–68	8–1	KFC Yum! Center (14,862); Louisville, KY
Dec 12, 2014*; 9:00 p.m., SECN	No. 8	Middle Tennessee	W 78–62	9–1	Memorial Coliseum (4,761); Lexington, KY
Dec 14, 2014*; 6:00 p.m., SECN	No. 8	Belmont	W 71–55	10–1	Memorial Coliseum (5,365); Lexington, KY
Dec 21, 2014*; 3:00 p.m., ESPN2	No. 8	at No. 13 Duke	L 68–89	10–2	Cameron Indoor Stadium (6,043); Durham, NC
Dec 28, 2014*; 2:00 p.m.	No. 12	Tennessee State	W 87–75	11–2	Memorial Coliseum (5,810); Lexington, KY
SEC regular season
Jan 2, 2015; 3:00 p.m.	No. 11	at Alabama	W 78–66	12–2 (1–0)	Foster Auditorium (2,654); Tuscaloosa, AL
Jan 4, 2015; 2:00 p.m., SECN	No. 11	Ole Miss	W 64–58	13–2 (2–0)	Memorial Coliseum (6,162); Lexington, KY
Jan 8, 2015; 7:00 p.m.	No. 10	Auburn	W 78–57	14–2 (3–0)	Memorial Coliseum (4,587); Lexington, KY
Jan 11, 2015; 1:00 p.m., ESPN2	No. 10	at No. 1 South Carolina	L 60–68	14–3 (3–1)	Colonial Life Arena (17,156); Columbia, SC
Jan 15, 2015; 7:00 p.m., SECN	No. 10	Florida	W 62–56	15–3 (4–1)	Memorial Coliseum (5,134); Lexington, KY
Jan 18, 2015; 2:00 p.m., ESPNU	No. 10	at LSU	L 79–84	15–4 (4–2)	Maravich Center (3,820); Baton Rouge, LA
Jan 25, 2015; 2:00 p.m., SECN	No. 14	at Missouri	W 83–69	16–4 (5–2)	Mizzou Arena (2,471); Columbia, MO
Jan 29, 2015; 7:00 p.m., SECN	No. 10	No. 6 Tennessee; Rivalry	L 72–73	16–5 (5–3)	Memorial Coliseum (7,407); Lexington, KY
Feb 1, 2015; 1:00 p.m., SECN	No. 10	No. 21 Georgia	W 80–72	17–5 (6–3)	Memorial Coliseum (6,991); Lexington, KY
Feb 8, 2015; 1:00 p.m., SECN	No. 11	at Vanderbilt	W 82–68	18–5 (7–3)	Memorial Gymnasium (4,235); Nashville, TN
Feb 12, 2015; 7:00 p.m., SECN	No. 10	No. 13 Mississippi State	W 92–90 ^{2OT}	19–5 (8–3)	Memorial Coliseum (5,100); Lexington, KY
Feb 12, 2015; 3:00 p.m., ESPN2	No. 10	at No. 6 Tennessee; Rivalry	L 58–72	19–6 (8–4)	Thompson–Boling Arena (16,013); Knoxville, TN
Feb 19, 2015; 7:00 p.m.	No. 11	No. 15 Texas A&M	L 69–81	19–7 (8–5)	Memorial Coliseum (5,516); Lexington, KY
Feb 23, 2015; 7:00 p.m., SECN	No. 13	at Ole Miss	L 59–67	19–8 (8–6)	Tad Smith Coliseum (1,017); Oxford, MS
Feb 26, 2015; 8:00 p.m.	No. 13	at Arkansas	W 59–51	20–8 (9–6)	Bud Walton Arena (2,614); Fayetteville, AR
Mar 1, 2015; 5:00 p.m., ESPN2	No. 13	No. 2 South Carolina	W 67–56	21–8 (10–6)	Memorial Coliseum (7,560); Lexington, KY
SEC Tournament
Mar 5, 2015; 8:30 p.m., SECN	No. 12	vs. Vanderbilt; Second Round	W 67–61	22–8	Verizon Arena (1,622); North Little Rock, AR
Mar 6, 2015; 9:30 p.m., SECN	No. 12	vs. No. 11 Mississippi State; Quarterfinals	W 76–67	23–8	Verizon Arena (4,189); North Little Rock, AR
Mar 7, 2015; 7:30 p.m., ESPNU	No. 12	vs. No. 5 Tennessee; Semifinals / Rivalry	L 64–75	23–9	Verizon Arena (5,524); North Little Rock, AR
NCAA Women's tournament
Mar 20, 2015*; 2:32 p.m., ESPN2	No. 11	Tennessee State; First Round	W 97–52	24–9	Memorial Coliseum (3,223); Lexington, KY
Mar 22, 2015*; 2:30 p.m., ESPN2	No. 11	Dayton; Second Round	L 94–99	24–10	Memorial Coliseum (3,320); Lexington, KY
*Non-conference game. ^{#}Rankings from AP Poll. (#) Tournament seedings in parentheses. All times are in Eastern Time.

== Rankings ==
Ranking movement Legend: ██ Increase in ranking. ██ Decrease in ranking. NR = Not ranked. RV = Received votes.
Poll	Pre	Wk 2	Wk 3	Wk 4	Wk 5	Wk 6	Wk 7	Wk 8	Wk 9	Wk 10	Wk 11	Wk 12	Wk 13	Wk 14	Wk 15	Wk 16	Wk 17	Wk 18	Final
AP	11	13	9	13	8	8	12	11	10	10	14	10	11	10	11	13	12	11	11
Coaches	10	9	10	13	8	8	13	11	11	11	14	10	12	10	10	15	11	11	11

== See also ==
- 2014–15 Kentucky Wildcats men's basketball team
