= Lebanon Commercial Historic District =

Lebanon Commercial Historic District may refer to:

- Lebanon Historic Commercial District (Lebanon, Kentucky), listed on the National Register of Historic Places (NRHP) in Marion County, Kentucky
- Lebanon Commercial District (Lebanon, Ohio), a historic district listed on the NRHP in Warren County, Ohio
- Lebanon Commercial Historic District (Lebanon, Tennessee), NRHP-listed in Wilson County

== See also ==
- Lebanon Historic District (disambiguation)
