= Kentucky Route 426 =

State highway in Kentucky, United States

Kentucky Route 426
- KY 426 highlighted in red

Route information
- Maintained by KYTC
- Length: 3.395 mi (5.464 km)

Major junctions
- West end: KY 84 near St. Mary
- East end: US 68 / KY 55 southwest of Lebanon

Location
- Country: United States
- State: Kentucky
- Counties: Marion

Highway system
- Kentucky State Highway System; Interstate; US; State; Parkways
← KY 425	→ KY 427

Kentucky Route 426 (KY 426) is a 3.395-mile-long (5.464 km) state highway in the U.S. state of Kentucky. The highway travels through rural areas of Marion County.

== Route description ==
KY 426 begins at an intersection with KY 84 (Raywick Road) south-southwest of St. Mary, within the central part of Marion County. It travels to the east-southeast and curves to the southeast before meeting its eastern terminus, an intersection with U.S. Route 68 (US 68) and KY 55 (Jane Todd Crawford Trail / Campbellsville Road). Here, the roadway continues as Mullins Lane.

== Major intersections ==
The entire route is in Marion County.

Location	mi	km	Destinations	Notes
	0.000	0.000	KY 84 (Raywick Road) – Marion Adjustment Center	Western terminus
	3.395	5.464	US 68 / KY 55 (Jane Todd Crawford Trail / Campbellsville Road) – Campbellsville, Lebanon	Eastern terminus
1.000 mi = 1.609 km; 1.000 km = 0.621 mi
