= Peter Boquel =

American football coach (1873–1950

Biographical details
- Born: March 6, 1873; St. Louis, Missouri, U.S.
- Died: September 20, 1950 (aged 77); Bethlehem, Pennsylvania, U.S.

Coaching career (HC unless noted)
- 1903–1904: Saint John's (MN)

Head coaching record
- Overall: 3–2

Peter Joseph Boquel (March 6, 1873 – September 20, 1950) was an American college football coach and physical director. He served as the head football coach at Saint John's University in Collegeville, Minnesota from 1903 to 1904, compiling a record of 3–2. He later served as an instructor at St. Mary's College in Marion County, Kentucky and as a physical director at Lehigh University in Allentown, Pennsylvania. Boquel died in 1950.

== Head coaching record ==
Year	Team	Overall	Conference	Standing	Bowl/playoffs
Saint John's Johnnies (Independent) (1903–1904)
1903	Saint John's	1–1			
1904	Saint John's	2–1			
Saint John's:		3–2			
Total:		3–2			
