= Kentucky Route 527 =

State highway in Kentucky, United States

Kentucky Route 527
- KY 527 highlighted in red

Route information
- Maintained by KYTC
- Length: 27.129 mi (43.660 km)

Major junctions
- South end: US 68 / KY 55 / KY 70 in Campbellsville
- KY 52 at St. Francis
- North end: KY 49 at Holy Cross

Location
- Country: United States
- State: Kentucky
- Counties: Marion, Taylor

Highway system
- Kentucky State Highway System; Interstate; US; State; Parkways
← KY 526	→ KY 528

Kentucky Route 527 (KY 527) is a 27.129-mile-long (43.660 km) state highway in the U.S. state of Kentucky. The route begins in Campbellsville at US Route 68 (US 68), KY 55, and KY 70 and continues north to Saloma. It enters Marion and Raywick before continuing north to St. Francis where it intersects with KY 52. The northern terminus is at an intersection with KY 49 at Holy Cross.

== Major intersections ==
County	Location	mi	km	Destinations	Notes
Taylor	Campbellsville	0.000	0.000	US 68 / KY 55 (Broadway) / KY 70 (North Central Avenue)	Southern terminus
Taylor	Campbellsville	1.124	1.809	KY 3350 (North Bypass Road)	
Taylor		1.872	3.013	KY 3212 west (Old Pitman Road)	Eastern terminus of KY 3212
Taylor		2.530	4.072	KY 3211 east (Mile Lane)	Western terminus of KY 3211
Taylor	Saloma	5.694	9.164	KY 744 east (Hobson Road)	South end of KY 744 overlap
Taylor	Saloma	5.849	9.413	KY 744 west (West Saloma Road) / Saloma School Road	North end of KY 744 overlap
Taylor		8.262	13.296	KY 1252 west (White Rose Road)	Eastern terminus of KY 1252
Marion	Raywick	18.576	29.895	KY 84 west (Howardstown Road)	South end of KY 84 overlap
Marion	Raywick	18.728	30.140	KY 84 east / Broadway Street	North end of KY 84 overlap
Marion	St. Francis	23.498	37.816	KY 52	
Marion	Holy Cross	27.084	43.587	KY 457 (New Haven Road)	
Marion	Holy Cross	27.129	43.660	KY 49 (Holy Cross Road)	Northern terminus
1.000 mi = 1.609 km; 1.000 km = 0.621 mi: Concurrency terminus
