= Holy Cross, Kentucky =

Unincorporated community in United States

- Unincorporated community
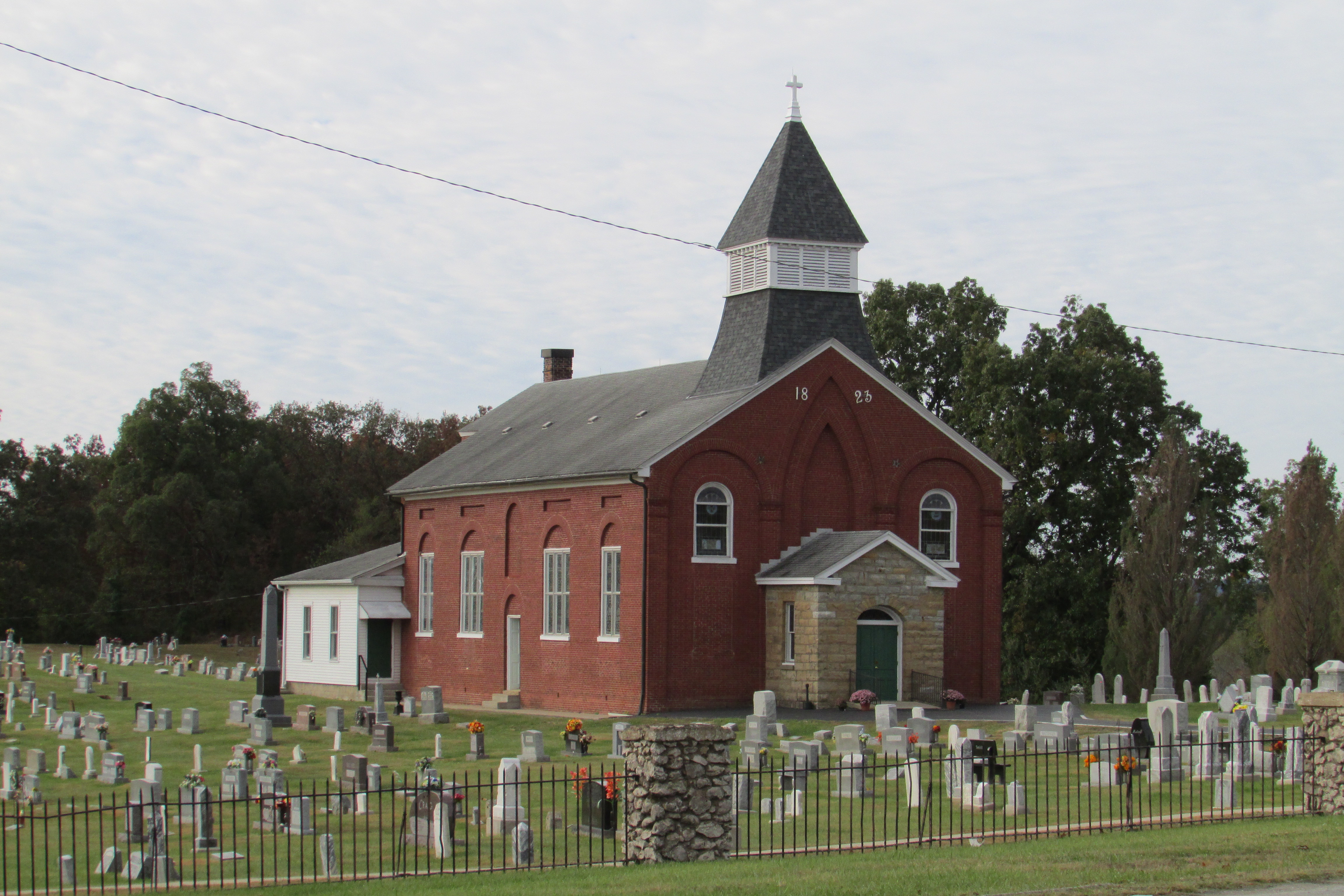
- Holy Cross Church in Holy Cross

- Location within Kentucky Location within the United States
- Coordinates: 37°40′26″N 85°26′49″W
- Country: United States
- State: Kentucky
- County: Marion
- Elevation: 682 ft (208 m)
- Time zone: UTC-5 (Eastern (EST))
  - Summer (DST): UTC-4 (EST)
- GNIS feature ID: 494449

Holy Cross is an unincorporated community in Marion County, Kentucky, United States. Its post office, which operated from 1886 to 1914, is closed. The area around Holy Cross was first explored and settled in 1779. In 1785, a "Catholic League" of sixty families from the Maryland counties of Prince George, Charles, and St. Mary's banded together under the leadership of Basil Hayden Sr., pledging to migrate to Kentucky and settle in the same area for mutual support, access to a Catholic priest, and the establishment of a church. Later that same year, Hayden and twenty-five families had settled near the headwaters of Pottinger's Creek where the town now is, founding a church also named Holy Cross.

== See also ==
- Kentucky Route 527
