= Holy Cross Church (Marion County, Kentucky) =

Historic Catholic church in Kentucky, US

- Sacred Heart Church
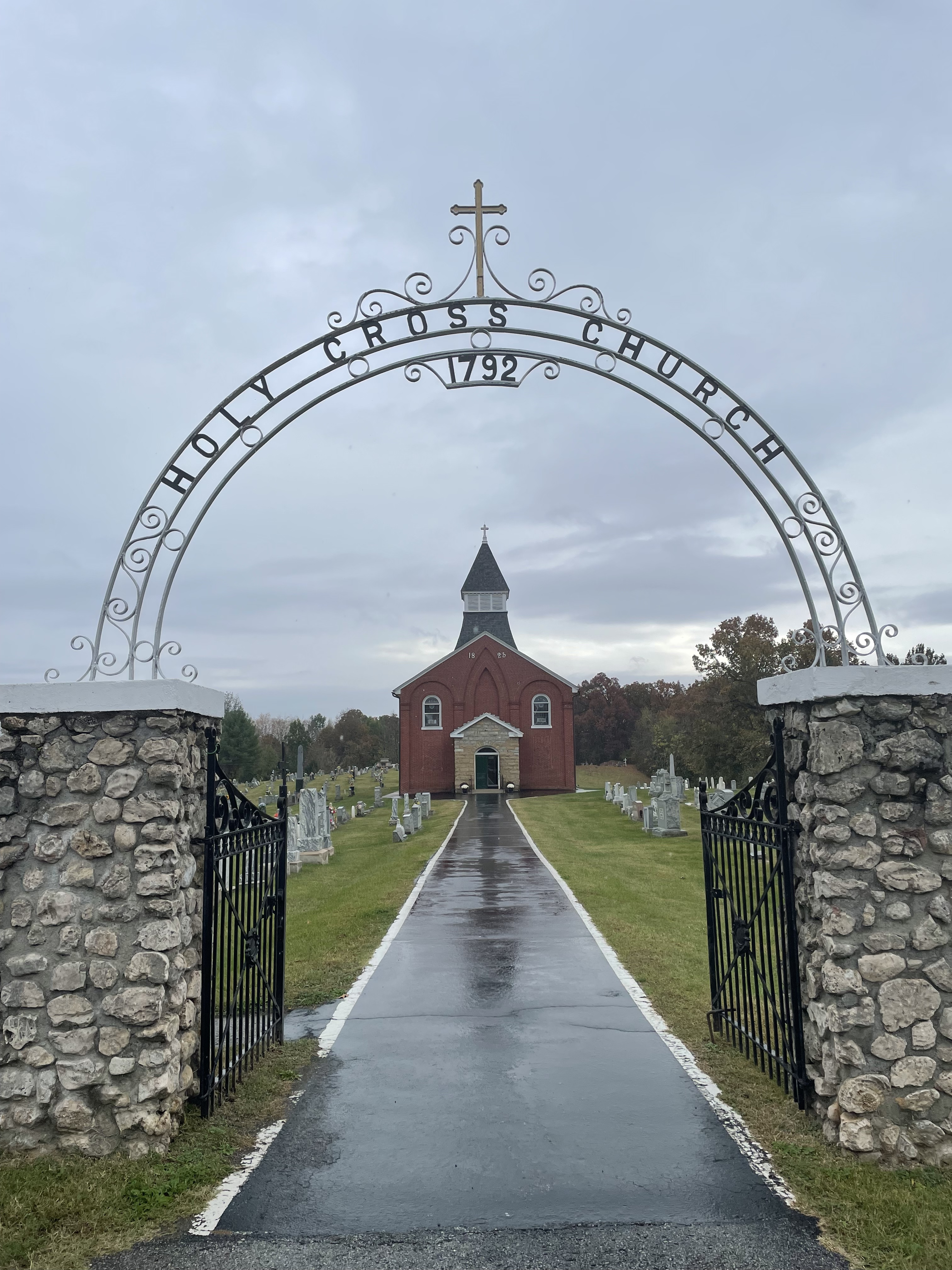
- Holy Cross Church
- 37°40′23″N 85°26′53″W
- Location: Holy Cross, Kentucky, US
- Address: 59 New Haven Rd; Loretto, KY 40037; United States
- Denomination: Catholic Church
- Sui iuris church: Latin Church
- Churchmanship: Roman Rite

History
- Former name: Sacred Heart
- Founded: 1785
- Founder(s): Fr. William de Rohan; Basil Hayden, Sr.

Architecture
- Completed: 1823

Administration
- Archdiocese: Archdiocese of Louisville

Clergy
- Archbishop: Shelton Fabre
- Pastor: Father Richard Goodin

Holy Cross Church is a Catholic parish church of the Archdiocese of Louisville located in Holy Cross, Kentucky, United States. The congregation was organized in 1785 and the original 1792 log church, sometimes called Sacred Heart, was the first Catholic church in the state of Kentucky. The current brick church was completed in 1823 and built on land that was donated by Basil Hayden Sr., the namesake of Basil Hayden whiskey.

== History ==
=== Background ===
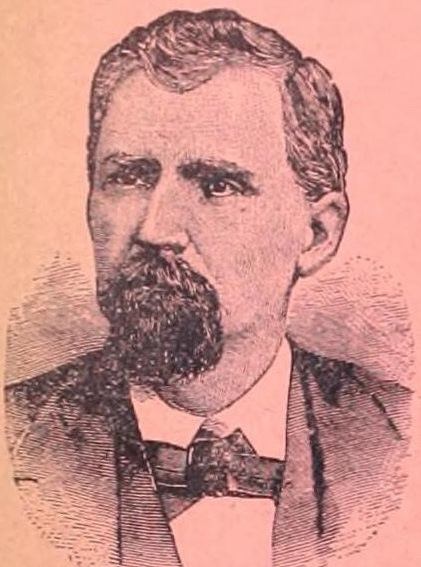
Basil Hayden Sr. as depicted on an 1896 whiskey bottle label

The area around Holy Cross was first explored and settled in 1779. In 1785, a "Catholic League" of sixty families from the Maryland counties of Prince George, Charles, and St. Mary's banded together under the leadership of Basil Hayden Sr. and pledged to migrate to Kentucky. There, they would settle together for mutual support, access to a Catholic priest, and the establishment of a church. Later that same year, Hayden and twenty-five families had settled near the headwaters of Pottinger's Creek where the unincorporated community of Holy Cross, Kentucky now is. In the fall of 1787, an Irish Capuchin priest named Charles Whelan arrived, having been sent by Archbishop John Carroll, and Masses were first said in Basil Hayden's home before a dedicated church was built. Due to trouble with parishioners, a court case concerning his salary, and the general anti-Catholicism in the area, Whelan left the community in 1790 for Maryland. That summer, Fr. William de Rohan arrived with a group of settlers from North Carolina and East Tennessee and took over the sacramental responsibilities that had previously been filled by Whelan.

=== Sacred Heart Church ===
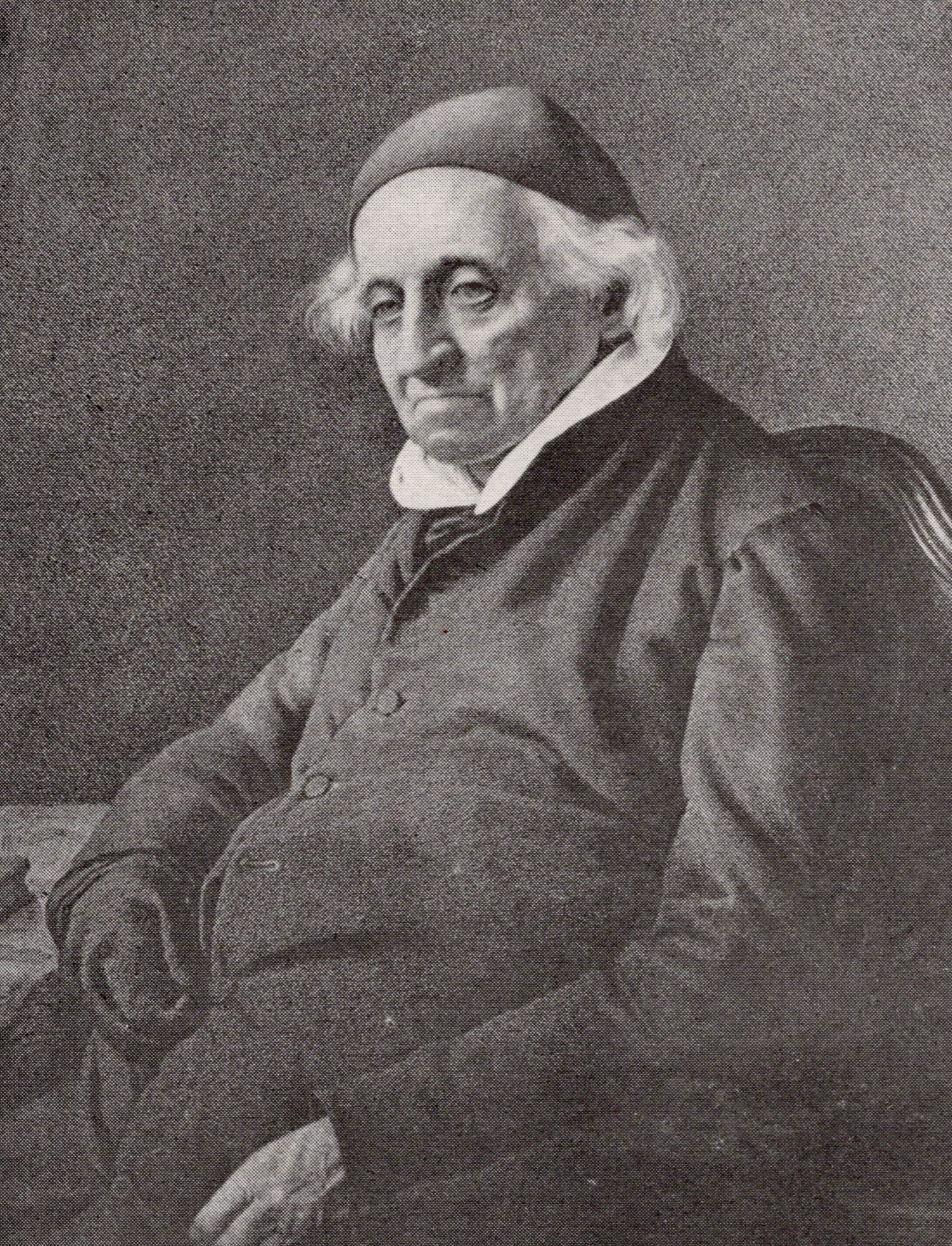
Fr. Stephen Badin served at Holy Cross Church from 1793 to 1819

Soon after arriving, in 1790, De Rohan initiated work on a log church built on two acres of land provided by Hayden. The church, which was also referred to as Sacred Heart, was completed in 1792. It had a dirt floor, rough-hewn timber for walls and the altar, and in winter a fire had to be built in front of the door to keep worshippers inside warm. De Rohan also placed a cross atop a large hill near the church, leading to the more lasting name of Holy Cross. Soon after its completion, De Rohan was asked to discontinue his priestly ministry due to alcoholism, and he willingly accepted, unlike other priests at the time. He lived a quiet life teaching in New Hope and farming until his death between 1832 and 1834 at St. Thomas Church in nearby Nelson County. The hill upon which he built the cross, Rohan's Knob, bears his name.

Stephen Badin, the first Catholic priest ordained in the United States, arrived in the community soon after the completion of the church in September 1793. He built a cabin three miles from Holy Cross, calling it "Saint Stephen's" and from there would evangelize much of the state of Kentucky. The first adult burial in the parish cemetery, that of James Mollahome, took place in 1801.

=== Trappists ===
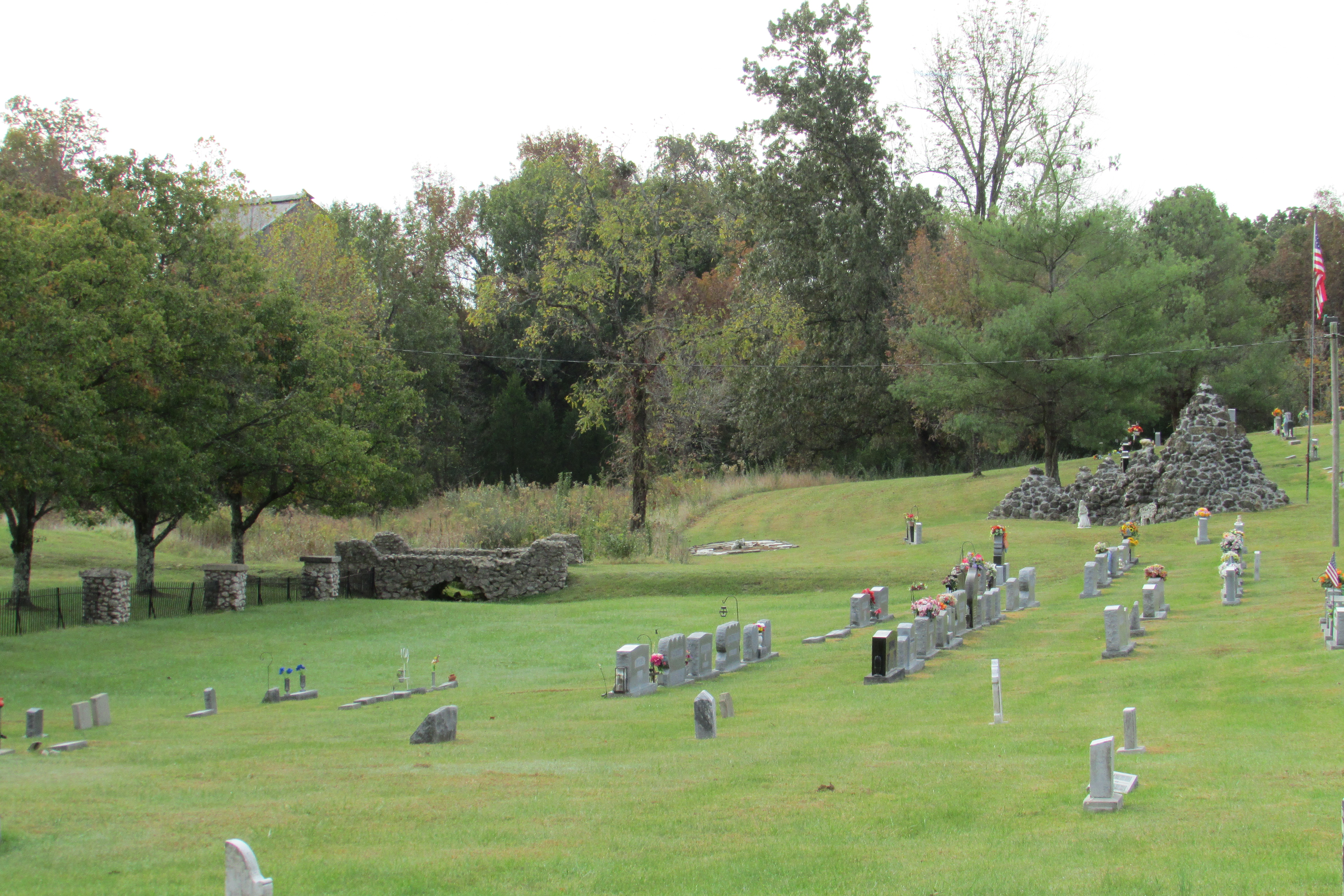
The cemetery at Holy Cross Church holds multiple Trappists from the failed first community. The stone mound on the right marks the place of the original log church.

A community of Trappist monks, fleeing the anticlericalism of the French Revolution, arrived at the church in November 1805. They established a school for local boys, visited the sick in the area, and lived a life of prayer and penance in their monastery at the foot of Rohan's Knob. Priests of the community also assisted in saying Mass at Holy Cross when Badin or the other resident priests were away on missionary travels. Unable to pay for the land they had bought and with many of their community dead from disease and buried in the church graveyard, they returned to France in 1809. The Trappists returned to Kentucky in 1848, establishing the Abbey of Our Lady of Gethsemani near Holy Cross in Nelson County.

Also arriving at the church in 1805 was Charles Nerinckx, a Belgian missionary priest sent by Archbishop Carroll to assist Badin in the 15 communities he was serving at this time. Nerinckx took particular delight in teaching and catechizing parishioners, often teaching as many as 90 per class. In 1807, the parish at Holy Cross consisted of 200 families. In April 1808 the Diocese of Bardstown was created by Pope Pius VII, encompassing all of Kentucky as well as Tennessee, Ohio, and the Northwest Territory under the leadership of Bishop Benedict Flaget. Previously Holy Cross had been administered by the Archdiocese of Baltimore. On 21 September 1811, Guy Chabrat, who would become the third bishop of Bardstown, was ordained to the diaconate in the log church. Following his priestly ordination at St. Rose Priory, he said his first Mass at Holy Cross on Christmas Day of 1811. Badin left Holy Cross for France in 1819 due to an ongoing dispute with Flaget concerning church property ownership.

=== New church ===
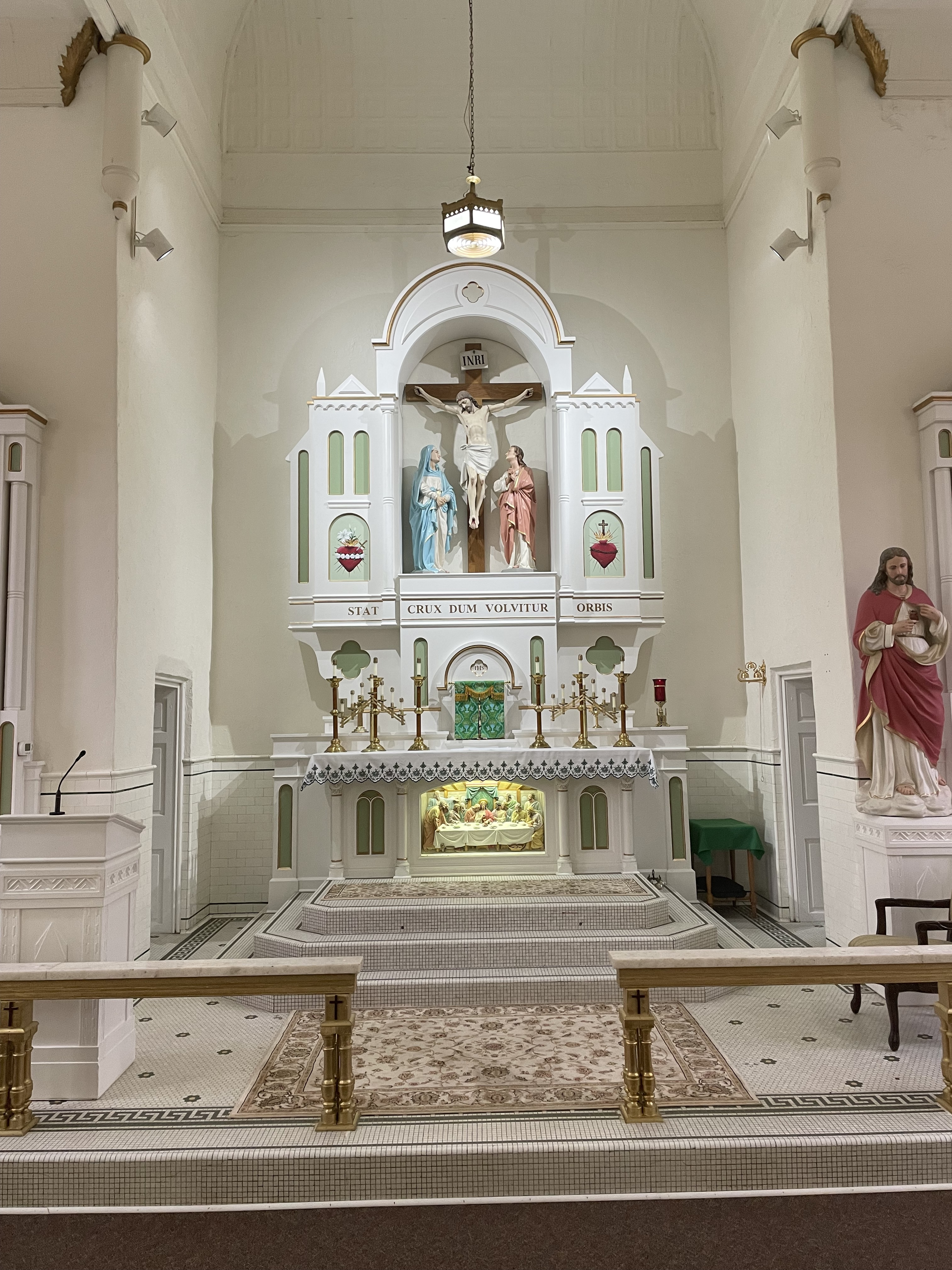
The interior of the 1823 church in 2024

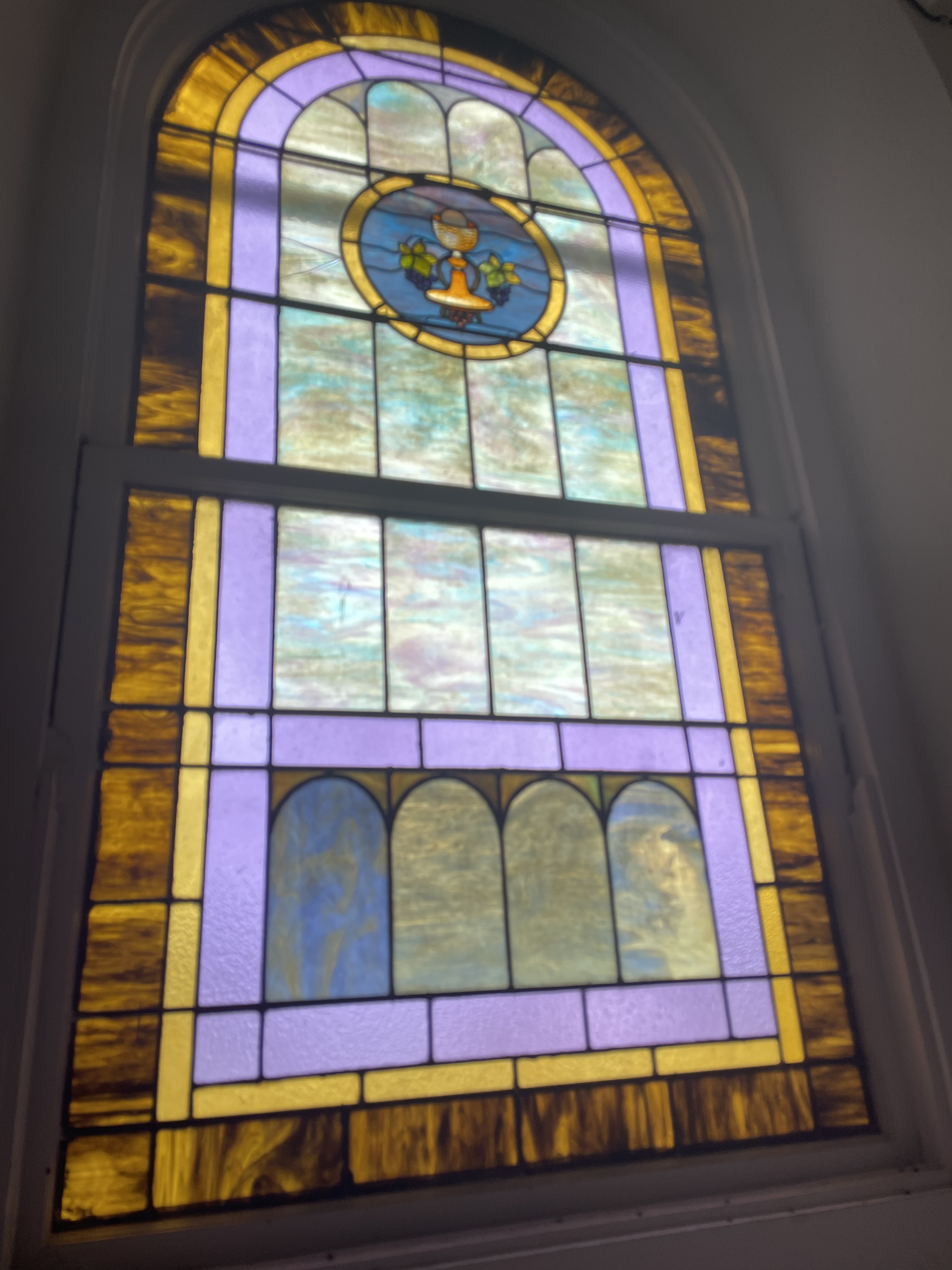
Stained-glass windows were added to the church in 1911

In the spring of 1823, Nerincx initiated the building of the current brick church, as the congregation in the area had grown both in size and wealth to support such an endeavor. It was completed that same year. Nerincx died in August 1824 and was succeeded by Fr. Robert Byrne, who had grown up in neighboring Nelson County. Byrne served as pastor of Holy Cross for twenty years, retiring in 1854 and dying two years later.

The first wooden parish school building was built under the pastorate of Edward Lynch in 1880. A new church bell for the community was blessed in July 1886 by William McCloskey. In 1914, Ursuline Sisters arrived to teach in the school. A convent was built for them and the school was enlarged. Stained glass windows were added to the church in 1911, and in 1928 a shrine marking the place of the original log church was dedicated. In 1958, a fire destroyed the combined grade school and high school. It was rebuilt, but closed in the late 1980s and now serves as a parish hall. More than 1,000 people attended the 200th anniversary celebration of the church on 15 September 1985. Since 1995, the parish has been clustered with nearby St. Francis of Assisi church, in Saint Francis, Kentucky, with one priest serving both communities.
