= James Whitlock =

James Whitlock may refer to:

- James E. Whitlock (born 1934), member of the Kentucky House of Representatives
- James H. Whitlock (1829–1901), member of the California legislature
