= Kentucky Route 208 =

State highway in Kentucky, United States

Kentucky Route 208
- KY 208 highlighted in red

Route information
- Maintained by KYTC
- Length: 11.1 mi (17.9 km)

Major junctions
- South end: US 68 / KY 55 / KY 744 west of Spurlington
- KY 412 south of Calvary
- North end: KY 2154 southwest of Lebanon

Location
- Country: United States
- State: Kentucky
- Counties: Taylor, Marion

Highway system
- Kentucky State Highway System; Interstate; US; State; Parkways
← KY 207	→ KY 209

Kentucky Route 208 (KY 208) is a 11.1-mile-long (17.9 km) state highway in the U.S. state of Kentucky. The highway travels through mostly rural areas of Taylor and Marion counties.

== Route description ==
KY 208 begins at an intersection with US 68/KY 55 (New Lebanon Road) west of Spurlington, within Taylor County. It travels to the east-northeast, concurrent with KY 744. Just over 200 feet (61 m) later, they split. KY 208 travels to the north-northeast and enters Marion County. It travels through Phillipsburg, where it crosses Cloyd Creek. The highway curves to the north-northwest and intersects the western terminus of KY 1157 and the eastern terminus of KY 412 (Calvary Road). It then crosses over the Rolling Fork River and enters Calvary, where it intersects the southern terminus of KY 2744 (Old Calvary Pike). At this intersection, KY 208 begins to head to the west-northwest. It crosses over Pontchartrain Creek, passes Calvary Elementary School, and curves to the north. It crosses over Indian Lick Creek and meets its northern terminus, an intersection with KY 2154 (Veterans Memorial Highway), where the roadway continues into Lebanon as New Calvary Road.

== Major intersections ==
County	Location	mi	km	Destinations	Notes
Taylor		0.0	0.0	US 68 / KY 55 (New Lebanon Road) / KY 744 west (Old Spurlington Road) – Campbellsville, Lebanon	Southern terminus; southern end of KY 744 concurrency
Taylor		0.1	0.16	KY 744 east (Spurlington Road)	Northern end of KY 744 concurrency
Marion		7.1	11.4	KY 1157 east	Western terminus of KY 1157
Marion		7.5	12.1	KY 412 west (Calvary Road)	Eastern terminus of KY 412
Marion	Calvary	8.0	12.9	KY 2744 north (Old Calvary Pike)	Southern terminus of KY 2744
Marion		11.1	17.9	KY 2154 (Veterans Memorial Highway)	Northern terminus
1.000 mi = 1.609 km; 1.000 km = 0.621 mi
