= Kentucky Route 84 =

State highway in Kentucky, United States

Kentucky Route 84
- KY 84 highlighted in red

Route information
- Maintained by KYTC
- Length: 70.432 mi (113.349 km)

Major junctions
- West end: KY 401 near Hudson
- US 62 near Eastview Western Kentucky Parkway near Eastview; I-65 in Sonora; US 31W in Sonora US 31E in Hodgenville
- East end: KY 49 / KY 52 in Lebanon

Location
- Country: United States
- State: Kentucky
- Counties: Breckinridge, Hardin, LaRue, Nelson, Marion

Highway system
- Kentucky State Highway System; Interstate; US; State; Parkways
← KY 83	→ KY 85

Kentucky Route 84 (KY 84) is a 70.432-mile-long (113.349 km) state highway in Kentucky that runs from KY 401 southwest of Hudson to KY 49 and KY 52 in Lebanon via Eastview, Sonora, Hodgenville, and Raywick.

== Major intersections ==
County	Location	mi	km	Destinations	Notes
Breckinridge		0.000	0.000	KY 401	Western terminus
Hardin		7.503	12.075	KY 920 south (Salt River Road)	West end of KY 920 overlap
Hardin		8.116	13.061	KY 920 north (Salt River Road)	East end of KY 920 overlap
Hardin	White Mills Junction	17.720	28.518	US 62	
Hardin		18.096– 18.186	29.123– 29.268	Western Kentucky Parkway – Paducah, Elizabethtown	Interchange; parkway exit 124
Hardin		19.292	31.047	KY 1866 south (Copelin Road)	Northern terminus of KY 1866
Hardin		21.913	35.266	KY 1823 north (White Mills-Glendale West Road)	Southern terminus of KY 1823
Hardin		22.917	36.881	KY 1375 north (South Long Grove Road)	Southern terminus of KY 1375
Hardin		24.959	40.168	KY 1868 north (New Glendale Road)	West end of KY 1868 overlap
Hardin		25.056	40.324	KY 1868 south (New Glandale Road)	East end of KY 1868 overlap
Hardin	Sonora	28.549	45.945	KY 720 west (West Western Avenue)	Eastern terminus of KY 720
Hardin	Sonora	29.001– 29.145	46.673– 46.904	I-65 – Bowling Green, Elizabethtown	Interchange; I-65 exit 81
Hardin	Sonora	29.322	47.189	US 31W – Elizabethtown	
LaRue		31.279	50.339	KY 1517 south (Oak Hill Road)	West end of KY 1517 overlap
LaRue		31.953	51.423	KY 1517 north (Siberia Road)	East end of KY 1517 overlap
LaRue		35.883	57.748	KY 357 south (Tanner Road)	Northern terminus of KY 357
LaRue		36.715	59.087	KY 222 west (Glendale Road)	Eastern terminus of KY 222
LaRue	Hodgenville	37.771	60.787	KY 61 (Lincoln Parkway)	
LaRue	Hodgenville	38.355	61.726	US 31E south (South Lincoln Boulevard) – Abraham Lincoln Birthplace, Hardyville, Glasgow	West end of US 31E concurrency
LaRue	Hodgenville	38.760	62.378	KY 210 west / US 31E south	Traffic circle around Abraham Lincoln statue; west end of KY 210 overlap
LaRue	Hodgenville	38.814	62.465	KY 210 east (South Greensburg Street)	East end of KY 210 overlap
LaRue		40.582	65.310	KY 1794 east (Leafdale Road)	Western terminus of KY 1794
LaRue		41.458	66.720	KY 1832 north (Salem Church Road)	Southern terminus of KY 1832
LaRue		43.185	69.500	KY 470 south (North L and N Turnpike Road)	West end of KY 470 overlap
LaRue		43.191	69.509	US 31E / KY 470 north – Abraham Lincoln's Boyhood Home at Knob Creek, New Haven, Bardstown	East end of US 31E concurrency and KY 470 overlap
Nelson	Howardstown	47.150	75.881	KY 427 north (Howardstown Road)	Southern terminus of KY 427
Nelson		54.712	88.050	KY 462 south (Gleanings Road)	Northern terminus of KY 462
Nelson		55.391	89.143	KY 457 north (Gap Knob Road)	Southern terminus of KY 457
Marion	Raywick	60.514	97.388	KY 527 south (Scott Ridge Road)	West end of KY 527 overlap
Marion	Raywick	60.666	97.632	KY 527 north (St. Francis-Raywick Road)	East end of KY 527 overlap
Marion		64.817	104.313	KY 412 east (St. Joseph Road)	Western terminus of KY 412
Marion		67.126	108.029	KY 426 east	Western terminus of KY 426
Marion	St. Mary	66.500	107.021	KY 327 north	Southern terminus of KY 327
Marion	Lebanon	70.430	113.346	KY 49 / KY 52 (Loretto Road)	Eastern terminus
1.000 mi = 1.609 km; 1.000 km = 0.621 mi: Concurrency terminus
