= George Elder (educator) =

George Elder (11 August 1793 in Hardin's Creek, Kentucky – 28 September 1838 in Bardstown, Kentucky) was a pioneer Roman Catholic educator.

== Life ==
His parents, James Elder and Ann Richards, natives of Maryland, moved shortly after their marriage to Hardin's Creek, in the present Marion County, Kentucky, where George, the second of their seven children was born. The Elders were Catholics, and George's early education devolved mainly upon his father.

George Elder in his sixteenth year entered Mount St. Mary's College in Emmitsburg, Maryland, to pursue classical studies. Here, he became the friend of William Byrne, afterwards founder of St. Mary's College, Kentucky, in George Elder's hometown. Both studied theology in St. Mary's Seminary, Baltimore, and were ordained priests at Bardstown by John David, Bishop of Bardstown, on September 18, 1819. In addition to the duties of an assistant at the cathedral there, Elder was entrusted by Benedict Joseph Flaget, David's successor, with the founding of a high-grade school or college for lay students. This was, at first, a day school and was taught in the basement of the theological seminary (erected in 1818). A separate building was erected in 1820–1823.

The college was then one of the largest and best-appointed educational structures in the entire West. (The community of Hardin's Creek would later be renamed "St. Mary" in its honor.) The arrival, in 1825, of fifty Southern students was the beginning of the extensive patronage the college received from the Southern states, notably Louisiana and Mississippi, and which continued down to the American Civil War. In 1827, Ignatius A. Reynolds (later Bishop of Charleston) was appointed president and Elder was given charge of the congregation of St. Pius, in Scott County, Kentucky.

Reynolds was transferred in 1830 to pastoral work, and Elder again became president, a position which he held until his death. He frequently did duty in the cathedral and was one of the editors of the Louisville Catholic Advocate newspaper (founded 1836), to which he contributed articles on the education of children. "Letters to Brother Jonathan", half satirical, half controversial, were also the product of his pen.

He prosecuted a Presbyterian preacher, Nathan L. Rice, for libeling a Kentucky priest who was then absent in Europe. His last illness followed the burning (25 January 1838) of the main college building.
