= William Byrne (Catholic) =

William Byrne (1780 – 5 June 1833) was an Irish-born American Roman Catholic missionary and educator. He was born in County Wicklow, Ireland and died at Bardstown, Kentucky.

== Life ==
One of a large family, Byrne was obliged by the death of his father to become a breadwinner. He had desired to be a priest, but circumstances denied him a more than common elementary education, imparted by an uncle. In his twenty-fifth year he emigrated to the United States, where, shortly after his arrival, he went to Georgetown College and applied for admission into the Society of Jesus.

Byrne's advanced age and lack of classical education, however, convinced him, after some months' stay there, that he could not reasonably hope to obtain in the Society, for many years at least, his ambition for ordination to the priesthood. He therefore left Georgetown, and by advice of Archbishop Carroll went to Mount St. Mary's College, Emmitsburg. Here John Dubois, the president, received him with sympathy, pointed out a course of study, and finding him a good disciplinarian, made him prefect of the institution. He was nearly thirty years of age when he began to study Latin, but his zeal and perseverance brought significant results.

In order to advance more rapidly in his studies, he entered St. Mary's Seminary, Baltimore, but the surroundings were not congenial, and he remained there only a short time. He had been ordained a subdeacon, and Bishop Flaget accepted his offer of service for the Diocese of Bardstown, Kentucky. He made further studies at St. Thomas' Seminary there, and was then ordained priest by Bishop David, 18 September 1819, with his friend George Elder, whom he had met at Emmitsburg. They were the first priests ordained at Bardstown, and by David, who was consecrated 15 August 1819.

Shortly after his ordination, Byrne was appointed pastor of St. Charles Church, replacing Charles Nerinckx, visiting also the small congregation of Louisville, sixty miles distant.

In the spring of 1821 he and Elder opened St. Mary's College, near Bardstown, in an old abandoned distillery that stood on a farm purchased by Nerinckx. Empty barrels served as desks and small kegs as chairs. Byrne set tuition low and accepted produce in payment. He had about fifty boys to begin with, one of them being Martin John Spalding, later Archbishop of Baltimore. The settlement of St. Mary, Kentucky took its name from the college.

Byrne at first filled every office in the school and attended to his missionary duties as well. His college had become very popular in Kentucky when it was destroyed by fire. He soon had the college rebuilt. A second fire ruined a large part of the new structure, but he went on and again placed the institution on a firm foundation.

It is estimated that from 1821 to 1833, during the time St. Mary's College was under his immediate direction, at least twelve hundred students received instruction there, and carried the benefits of their education to all parts of Kentucky, some of them establishing private schools on their return to their respective neighborhoods.

Bryne, after twelve year's management of the college, made a gift of it to the Society of Jesus, believing that, having established its success, his old friends, the Jesuits, were better qualified than he was to conduct the school. He thought of funding a new school at Nashville, where one was much needed, and in spite of his advanced years he wrote to Bishop Flaget that all that he required in leaving St. Mary's to embark on this new enterprise was his horse and ten dollars to pay his traveling expenses. Before he could carry out the plan, however, a cholera epidemic had broken out in the neighborhood, and having gone to administer the last sacraments to a woman who lay dying of the disease, he became infected himself, and died the following day.
