= St. Mary's College (Kentucky) =

St. Mary's College was a Catholic institution established by William Byrne and George Elder in Elder's hometown of Hardin's Creek near Lebanon in Marion County, Kentucky. The community was later renamed "St. Mary" after the college. St. Mary's is now closed. It operated between 1821 and 1976. Before it closed, it was the third oldest operating Catholic college for boys in the nation.

The St. Mary's College Historic District was listed on the National Register of Historic Places in 1980.

== Historic district ==
- St. Mary's College Historic District
- U.S. National Register of Historic Places
- Location within Kentucky Location within the United States
- Nearest city: St. Mary, Kentucky
- Coordinates: 37°34′12″N 85°20′41″W
- Area: 7.5 acres (3.0 ha)
- Built: 1821
- Architectural style: Late Victorian, Federal
- NRHP reference No.: 80001654
- Added to NRHP: April 10, 1980

The "St. Mary's College Historic District" is a 7.5 acres (3.0 ha) historic district which included 12 contributing buildings.

== Notable alumni ==
- Clement S. Hill, U.S. congressman from Kentucky
- Ben Johnson, U.S. congressman from Kentucky
- Elisha Standiford, U.S. congressman from Kentucky
- William Thomas Ward, Union Army general and U.S. congressman from Kentucky
- Joseph Cardinal Bernardin, American Cardinal of the Catholic Church, served as Archbishop of Chicago from 1982 to 1996
- Martin John Spalding, Bishop of Louisville (1850–1864) and Archbishop of Baltimore (1864–1872)
- John Lancaster Spalding, the first bishop of the Roman Catholic Diocese of Peoria from 1877 to 1908
- Augustus Hill Garland, 11th governor of Arkansas and Attorney General of the United States
- Thomas James Churchill, Confederate major general during the American Civil War and the 13th Governor of the state of Arkansas
- Stanislaus P. La Lumiere, President of Marquette University

== See also ==
- List of Jesuit sites
