= James E. Whitlock =

American politician (1934–2019)

James Whitlock

Member of the Kentucky House of Representatives
- In office January 1, 1962 – January 1, 1968
- Preceded by: Robert H. Cowherd
- Succeeded by: Herman W. Rattliff
- Constituency: 30th district (1962–1964); 29th district (1964–1968)

Personal details
- Party: Democratic

James E. Whitlock (January 20, 1934 – February 12, 2019), better known as Jimmie Whitlock, was an American politician who was a Democratic member of the Kentucky House of Representatives from Lebanon, the seat of Marion County, Kentucky.

Whitlock was first elected to the 30th district in 1961. Following the redistricting of the house, he was reelected to the 29th district in 1963 and 1965. He did not seek a fourth term in 1967. He was instrumental in developing Community Trust Bank and was CEO for three decades.

Whitlock died at his home on February 12, 2019, at the age of 85.
