= Stanislaus P. La Lumiere =

Roman Catholic priest and President of Marquette University

Stanislaus P. La Lumiere (1822 - 1895) was a Roman Catholic priest and president of Marquette University in Milwaukee, Wisconsin, USA.

== Biography ==
La Lumiere was born Stanislaus Petty, (French-Petit) La Lumiere on February 13, 1822, in Vincennes, Indiana. After attending St. Mary's College, he began studying law. He was admitted to the bar in 1844. One of his examiners was the future president of the United States, Abraham Lincoln.

La Lumiere joined the Society of Jesus in 1849 and was ordained into the priesthood in 1855. He died in 1895.

== Academic career ==
After being principal at St. Aloysius Academy in Milwaukee, La Lumiere took part in founding Marquette University in 1881. He was its president from 1887 to 1889.
