= Makayla Epps =

American basketball player (born 1995)

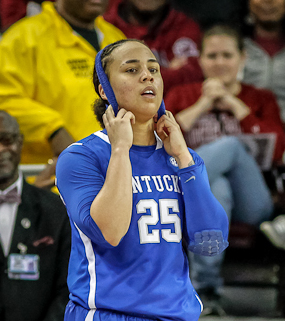

Free agent
- Position: Point guard

Personal information
- Born: June 6, 1995 (age 31) Lebanon, Kentucky, U.S.
- Listed height: 5 ft 10 in (1.78 m)

Career information
- High school: Marion County (Lebanon, Kentucky)
- College: Kentucky (2013–2017)
- WNBA draft: 2017: 3rd round, 33rd overall pick
- Drafted by: Chicago Sky
- Playing career: 2017–present

Career history
- 2017: Chicago Sky

Career highlights
- 3x First-team All-SEC (2015–2017); McDonald's All-American (2013)
- Stats at WNBA.com
- Stats at Basketball Reference

Makayla Epps (born June 6, 1995) is an American professional women's basketball player. She last played for the Chicago Sky of the Women's National Basketball Association (WNBA). She was drafted from the University of Kentucky with the 33rd overall pick in the 2017 WNBA draft.

She is the daughter of former University of Kentucky player, Anthony Epps, who was a member of the national champion 1995–96 Kentucky Wildcats men's basketball team.

== Career statistics ==
=== WNBA career statistics ===
Legend
GP	Games played	GS	Games started	MPG	Minutes per game	RPG	Rebounds per game
APG	Assists per game	SPG	Steals per game	BPG	Blocks per game	PPG	Points per game
TO	Turnovers per game	FG%	Field-goal percentage	3P%	3-point field-goal percentage	FT%	Free-throw percentage
**Bold**	Career best	°	League leader

==== Regular season ====
Year	Team	GP	GS	MPG	FG%	3P%	FT%	RPG	APG	SPG	BPG	TO	PPG
2017	Chicago	17	0	3.8	16.7	0.0	55.6	0.2	0.4	0.1	0.0	0.3	0.6
Career	1 year, 1 team	17	0	3.8	16.7	0.0	55.6	0.2	0.4	0.1	0.0	0.3	0.6

=== Kentucky statistics ===
Legend
GP	Games played	GS	Games started	MPG	Minutes per game
FG%	Field goal percentage	3P%	3-point field goal percentage	FT%	Free throw percentage
RPG	Rebounds per game	APG	Assists per game	SPG	Steals per game
BPG	Blocks per game	PPG	Points per game	**Bold**	Career high

Year	Team	GP	Points	FG%	3P%	FT%	RPG	APG	SPG	BPG	PPG
2013–14	Kentucky	**34**	155	**48.3%**	29.3%	67.4%	1.4	1.4	0.3	0.0	4.6
2014–15	Kentucky	**34**	506	44.4%	31.6%	69.1%	4.6	3.0	**1.3**	**0.2**	14.9
2015–16	Kentucky	32	546	47.3%	28.3%	72.6%	**4.8**	**4.5**	1.3	0.1	17.1
2016–17	Kentucky	33	**583**	45.9%	**35.5%**	**76.1%**	4.5	3.6	1.0	0.1	**17.7**
Career		133	1790	46.1%	31.7%	71.9%	3.8	3.1	1.0	0.1	13.5
