= Bradfordsville, Kentucky =

- City
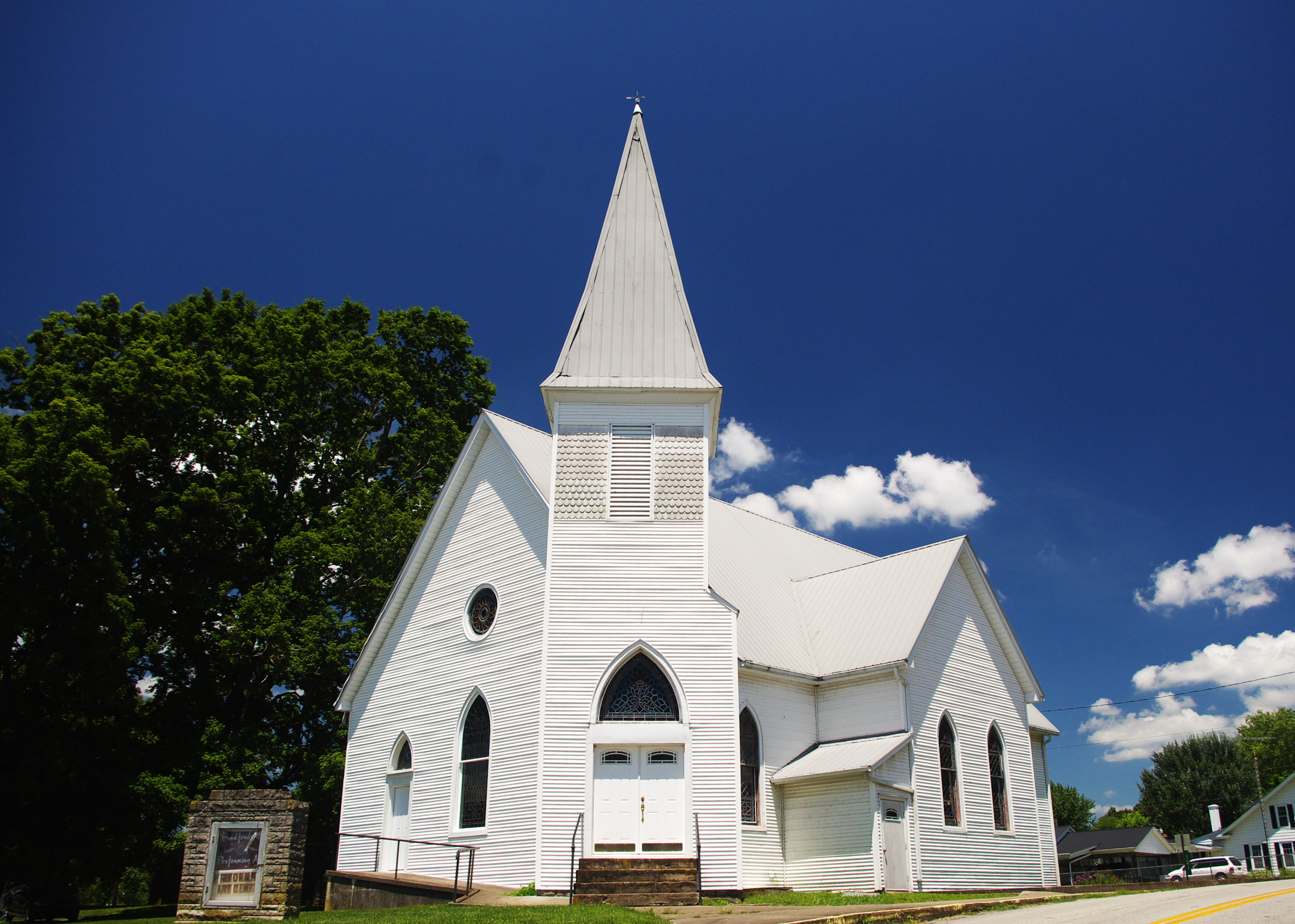
- Bradfordsville Performing Arts Center, formerly Bradfordsville Christian Church

- Location in Marion County, Kentucky
- Coordinates: 37°29′43″N 85°8′54″W
- Country: United States
- State: Kentucky
- County: Marion
- Established: 1777
- Incorporated: January 30, 1836
- Named for: A local miller

Area
  - Total: 0.27 sq mi (0.70 km^{2})
  - Land: 0.27 sq mi (0.70 km^{2})
  - Water: 0.0039 sq mi (0.01 km^{2})
- Elevation: 699 ft (213 m)

Population (2020)
  - Total: 270
  - Density: 1,001/sq mi (386.3/km^{2})
- Time zone: UTC-5 (Eastern (EST))
  - Summer (DST): UTC-4 (EDT)
- ZIP code: 40009
- Area codes: 270 & 364
- FIPS code: 21-09100
- GNIS feature ID: 0487792

Bradfordsville is a home rule-class city in Marion County, Kentucky, in the United States. The population was 270 at the time of the 2020 census.

== History ==
The community at the site was first known as Centerville from its supposed location at the center of the state. (Having since gained the Jackson Purchase, the present geographic center of the state remains nearby at Cowherd Road and McCarty Lane on Ky. 429 northwest of Lebanon.) The settlement was renamed Bradford's Mill after Peter Bradford's combined saw- and gristmill at the site; this became "Bradfordsville" after the establishment of a post office in 1834.

== Geography ==
Bradfordsville is located in southeastern Marion County at 37°29′43″N 85°8′54″W (37.495328, -85.148452). According to the U.S. Census Bureau, the city has a total area of 0.27 square miles (0.70 km^{2}), all land. Bradfordsville lies in the Rolling Fork Valley, just east of the point where the North Rolling Fork and the Big South Fork converge to form the Rolling Fork proper. The Rolling Fork is a northwest-flowing tributary of the Salt River, which joins the Ohio River a few miles downstream. Bradfordsville is mostly surrounded by rugged hills, with the Muldraugh Hill escarpment rising to the south.

Bradfordsville is concentrated around the intersection of Kentucky Route 337 (Main Street) and Kentucky Route 49 (Liberty Road). The former leads northeast 9 miles (14 km) to Gravel Switch and the Perryville area and southwest 12 miles (19 km) to Mannsville, while the latter leads southeast 20 miles (32 km) to Liberty and northwest 9 miles (14 km) to Lebanon, the Marion county seat.

=== Climate ===
Climate data for Bradfordsville, Kentucky (1991–2020)
Month	Jan	Feb	Mar	Apr	May	Jun	Jul	Aug	Sep	Oct	Nov	Dec	Year
Mean daily maximum °F (°C)	43.7 (6.5)	48.5 (9.2)	57.8 (14.3)	68.8 (20.4)	77.1 (25.1)	84.7 (29.3)	87.8 (31.0)	87.2 (30.7)	81.9 (27.7)	71.0 (21.7)	58.2 (14.6)	47.9 (8.8)	67.9 (19.9)
Daily mean °F (°C)	33.9 (1.1)	37.0 (2.8)	44.9 (7.2)	54.9 (12.7)	64.6 (18.1)	72.4 (22.4)	76.2 (24.6)	74.8 (23.8)	68.4 (20.2)	56.9 (13.8)	45.6 (7.6)	37.9 (3.3)	55.6 (13.1)
Mean daily minimum °F (°C)	24.1 (−4.4)	25.6 (−3.6)	31.9 (−0.1)	41.0 (5.0)	52.1 (11.2)	60.2 (15.7)	64.7 (18.2)	62.3 (16.8)	55.0 (12.8)	42.7 (5.9)	32.9 (0.5)	27.8 (−2.3)	43.4 (6.3)
Average precipitation inches (mm)	4.09 (104)	4.25 (108)	4.86 (123)	4.85 (123)	5.02 (128)	4.99 (127)	5.31 (135)	3.85 (98)	4.22 (107)	2.96 (75)	3.27 (83)	4.73 (120)	52.4 (1,331)
Average snowfall inches (cm)	5.0 (13)	5.0 (13)	1.6 (4.1)	0.0 (0.0)	0.0 (0.0)	0.0 (0.0)	0.0 (0.0)	0.0 (0.0)	0.0 (0.0)	0.0 (0.0)	0.1 (0.25)	2.8 (7.1)	14.5 (37.45)
Source: NOAA

== Demographics ==
Historical population
Census	Pop.	Note	%±
1860	186		—
1870	155		−16.7%
1880	150		−3.2%
1890	179		19.3%
1900	301		68.2%
1910	330		9.6%
1920	298		−9.7%
1960	387		—
1970	338		−12.7%
1980	331		−2.1%
1990	199		−39.9%
2000	304		52.8%
2010	294		−3.3%
2020	270		−8.2%
U.S. Decennial Census

As of the census of 2000, there were 304 people, 133 households, and 75 families residing in the city. The population density was 1,068.3 inhabitants per square mile (412.5/km^{2}). There were 150 housing units at an average density of 527.1 per square mile (203.5/km^{2}). The racial makeup of the city was 97.04% White, 1.32% from other races, and 1.64% from two or more races. Hispanic or Latino of any race were 1.32% of the population.

There were 133 households, out of which 29.3% had children under the age of 18 living with them, 39.1% were married couples living together, 12.0% had a female householder with no husband present, and 42.9% were non-families. 37.6% of all households were made up of individuals, and 14.3% had someone living alone who was 65 years of age or older. The average household size was 2.29 and the average family size was 2.97.

In the city, the population was spread out, with 25.7% under the age of 18, 10.9% from 18 to 24, 30.3% from 25 to 44, 18.8% from 45 to 64, and 14.5% who were 65 years of age or older. The median age was 35 years. For every 100 females, there were 83.1 males. For every 100 females age 18 and over, there were 88.3 males.

The median income for a household in the city was $16,125, and the median income for a family was $21,250. Males had a median income of $22,917 versus $17,500 for females. The per capita income for the city was $17,222. About 22.1% of families and 26.5% of the population were below the poverty line, including 27.3% of those under the age of eighteen and 17.9% of those 65 or over.

== Notable people ==
- U. M. Rose, Arkansas lawyer
