= Saloma, Kentucky =

Unincorporated community in Kentucky, United States

Saloma
- Unincorporated community
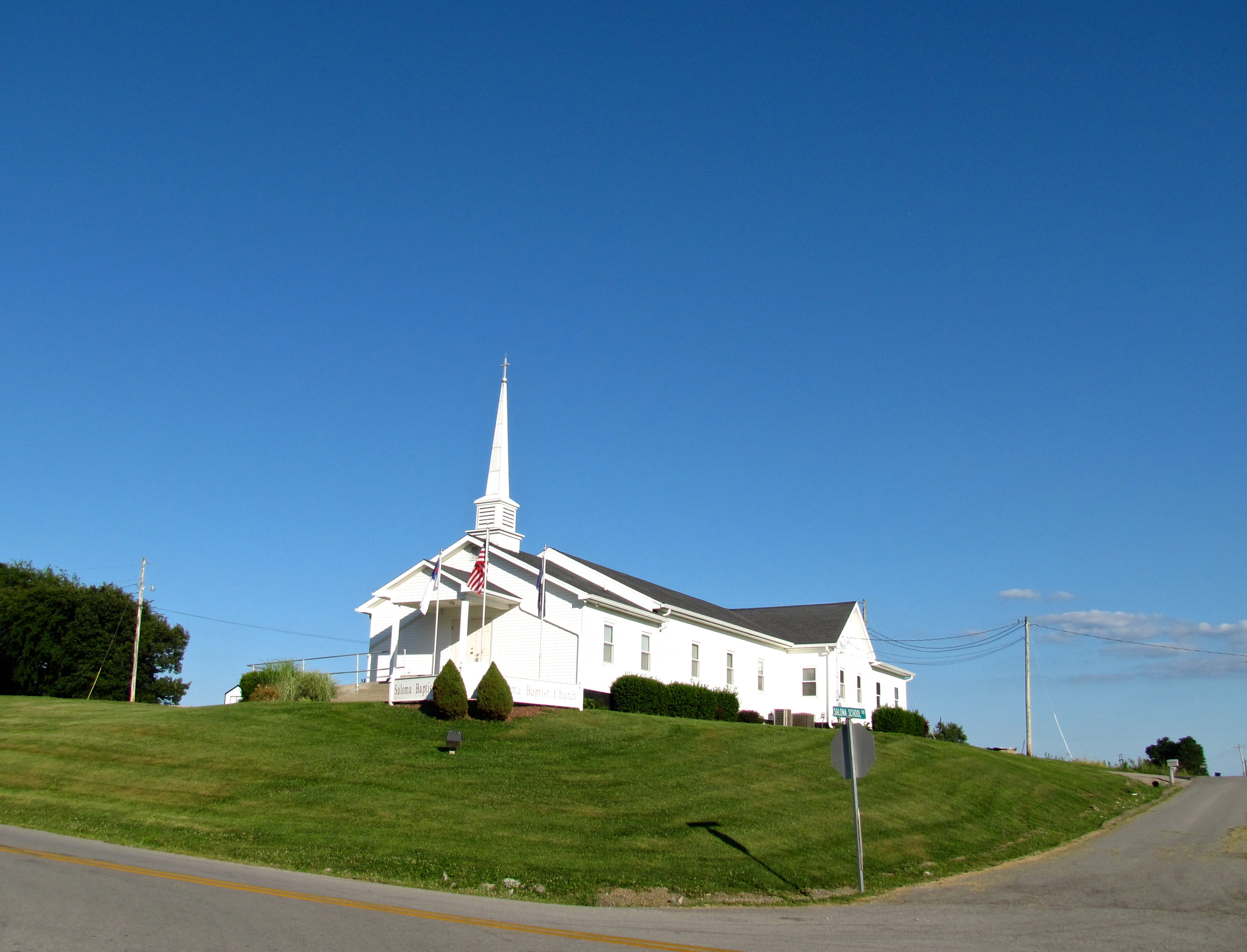
- Saloma Baptist Church

- Location within the state of Kentucky Saloma (the United States)
- Coordinates: 37°24′43″N 85°23′34″W
- Country: United States
- State: Kentucky
- County: Taylor
- Elevation: 906 ft (276 m)
- Time zone: UTC-5 (Eastern (EST))
  - Summer (DST): UTC-4 (EDT)
- GNIS feature ID: 502817

Saloma is an unincorporated community in Taylor County, Kentucky, United States. It lies along Routes 527 and 744 northwest of the city of Campbellsville, the county seat of Taylor County. Its elevation is 906 feet (276 m).

Saloma was established in 1838, and had its own post office during the 19th century. The origin of the name "Saloma" is unknown.
