= Kentucky Route 401 =

Highway in Kentucky, United States

Kentucky Route 401
- KY 401 highlighted in red

Route information
- Maintained by KYTC
- Length: 10.240 mi (16.480 km)

Major junctions
- West end: KY 259 in Madrid
- KY 84 near Hudson
- East end: KY 86 in Dyer

Location
- Country: United States
- State: Kentucky
- Counties: Breckinridge

Highway system
- Kentucky State Highway System; Interstate; US; State; Parkways
← KY 400	→ KY 402

Kentucky Route 401 (KY 401) is a 10.240-mile-long (16.480 km) state highway in the U.S. state of Kentucky. The highway travels through mostly rural areas of Breckinridge County.

== Route description ==
KY 401 begins at an intersection with KY 259 (Leitchfield Road) in Madrid, within the southeastern part of Breckinridge County. It travels to the northeast and travels through Centerview. After intersecting the western terminus of KY 84 (Hardin Springs Road), it curves to the north-northeast and travels through Hudson. The highway heads to the east-northeast and curves to the northeast. It travels through Constantine and curves to the north-northeast before meeting its eastern terminus, an intersection with KY 86, in Dyer.

== Major intersections ==
The entire route is in Breckinridge County.

Location	mi	km	Destinations	Notes
Madrid	0.000	0.000	KY 259 (Leitchfield Road)	Western terminus
	4.342	6.988	KY 84 east (Hardin Springs Road)	Western terminus of KY 84
Dyer	10.240	16.480	KY 86	Eastern terminus
1.000 mi = 1.609 km; 1.000 km = 0.621 mi
