= Raywick, Kentucky =

- Unincorporated community
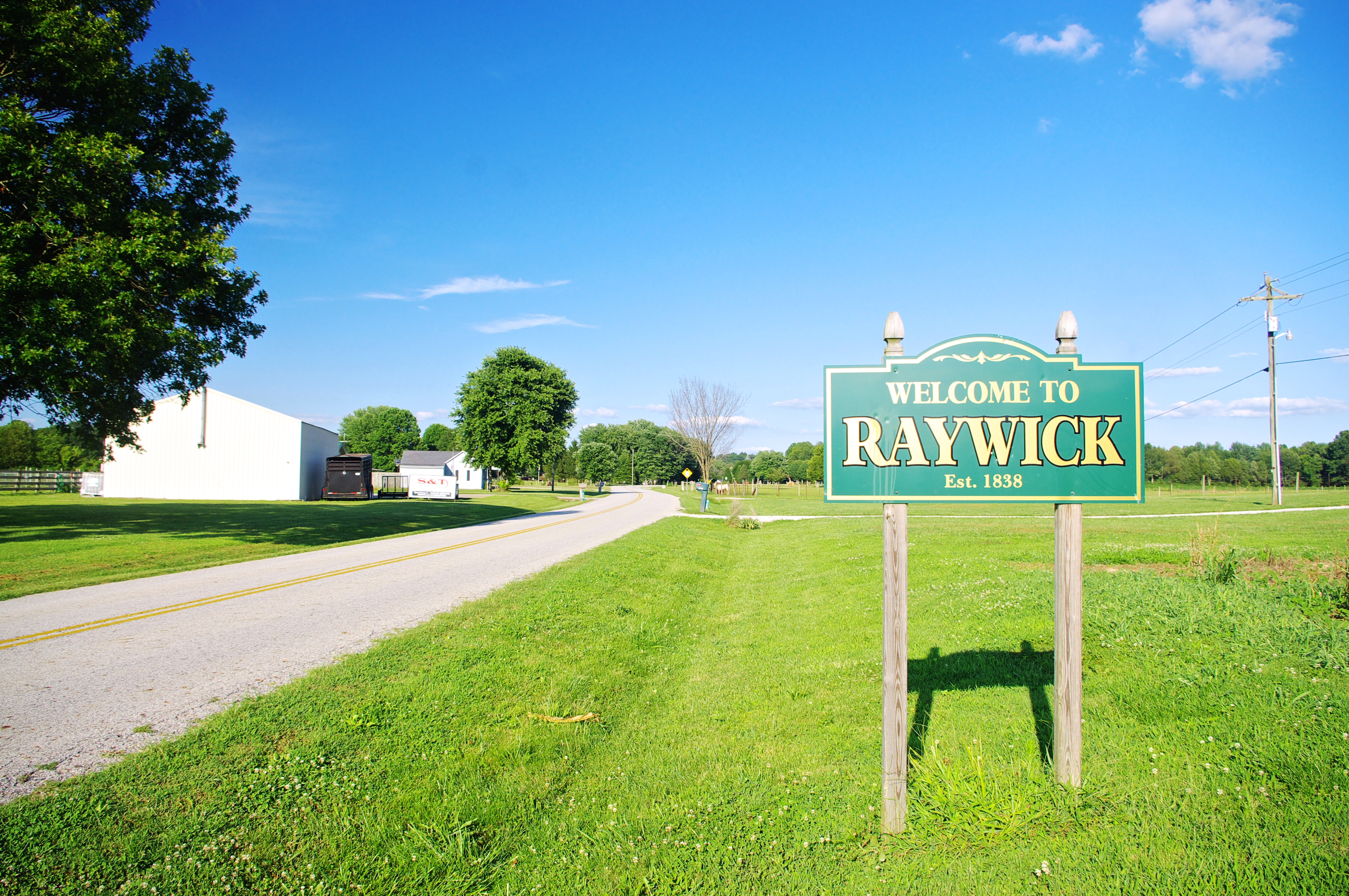
- Welcome sign along KY 84

- Location in Marion County, Kentucky
- Coordinates: 37°33′38″N 85°25′47″W
- Country: United States
- State: Kentucky
- County: Marion

Area
  - Total: 0.92 sq mi (2.37 km^{2})
  - Land: 0.90 sq mi (2.32 km^{2})
  - Water: 0.019 sq mi (0.05 km^{2})
- Elevation: 607 ft (185 m)

Population (2020)
  - Total: 155
  - Density: 173/sq mi (66.8/km^{2})
- Time zone: UTC-5 (Eastern (EST))
  - Summer (DST): UTC-4 (EDT)
- ZIP code: 40060
- Area codes: 270 & 364
- FIPS code: 21-64146
- GNIS feature ID: 0501630

Raywick is a former home rule-class city in Marion County, Kentucky, United States. The population was 155 at the 2020 census. The city was dissolved by court order in 2024, as no candidates had run for mayor or city council in the last election.

== History ==
The name "Raywick" is a compound of the names of two pioneer families, Ray and Wickliffe. Two members of these families, Loyd Ray and Nancy Wickliffe, married in 1811. A post office has been in operation at Raywick since 1833. The city incorporated in 1838.

== Geography ==
Raywick is located in western Marion County at 37°33′38″N 85°25′47″W (37.560472, −85.429675). The city is situated along the Rolling Fork, just upstream from the river's confluence with Prather Creek, and 5 miles (8 km) east of the point where Marion, Nelson, and LaRue counties meet. Raywick is concentrated around the intersection of Kentucky Route 527, which leads north 6 miles (10 km) to Loretto and south over the Muldraugh Hill escarpment 18 miles (29 km) to Campbellsville, and Kentucky Route 84, which connects the city with Lebanon 10 miles (16 km) to the east.

According to the United States Census Bureau, the city has a total area of 0.92 square miles (2.38 km^{2}), of which 0.02 square miles (0.05 km^{2}), or 2.08%, are water.

== Demographics ==
Historical population
Census	Pop.	Note	%±
1860	158		—
1870	160		1.3%
1880	146		−8.7%
1900	140		—
1910	182		30.0%
1990	157		—
2000	144		−8.3%
2010	134		−6.9%
2020	155		15.7%
U.S. Decennial Census

As of the census of 2000, there were 144 people, 59 households, and 44 families residing in the city. The population density was 194.1 inhabitants per square mile (74.9/km^{2}). There were 67 housing units at an average density of 90.3 units per square mile (34.9 units/km^{2}). The racial makeup of the city was 100.00% White.

There were 59 households, out of which 40.7% had children under the age of 18 living with them, 55.9% were married couples living together, 15.3% had a female householder with no husband present, and 25.4% were non-families. 23.7% of all households were made up of individuals, and 11.9% had someone living alone who was 65 years of age or older. The average household size was 2.44 and the average family size was 2.89.

In the city, the population was spread out, with 27.1% under the age of 18, 4.9% from 18 to 24, 30.6% from 25 to 44, 23.6% from 45 to 64, and 13.9% who were 65 years of age or older. The median age was 36 years. For every 100 females, there were 80.0 males. For every 100 females age 18 and over, there were 81.0 males.

The median income for a household in the city was $34,375, and the median income for a family was $41,250. Males had a median income of $31,000 versus $20,625 for females. The per capita income for the city was $14,147. There were 5.6% of families and 12.9% of the population living below the poverty line, including 16.0% of under eighteens and 19.0% of those over 64.

== Notable people ==
- J. Proctor Knott, governor of Kentucky
