= Mannsville =

Mannsville may refer to:

- Mannsville, Kentucky, United States
- Mannsville, New York, United States
- Mannsville, Oklahoma, United States
