= Clel Purdom House =

Historic house in Kentucky, United States

- U.S. National Register of Historic Places
- Location within Kentucky Location within the United States
- Location: 7075 Danville Highway, in or near Lebanon, Kentucky
- Coordinates: 37°34′31″N 85°09′22″W
- Area: 3 acres (1.2 ha)
- Architectural style: Italianate
- NRHP reference No.: 16000009
- Added to NRHP: February 11, 2016

The Clel Purdom House is a historic Italianate-style house which was completed by 1884. It was listed on the National Register of Historic Places in 2016.

== Geography ==
The house is a two-story frame single-pile five-bay I-house. Its Italianate features include its overhanging eaves with the decorative brackets, and its tall, narrow windows. It has two internal chimneys and it is clad with weatherboards.

Although the listing is for just 3 acres (1.2 ha), the house is at the center of a 244 acres (99 ha) farm.
