= Lebanon National Cemetery =

Historic veterans cemetery in Marion County, Kentucky

- U.S. National Register of Historic Places
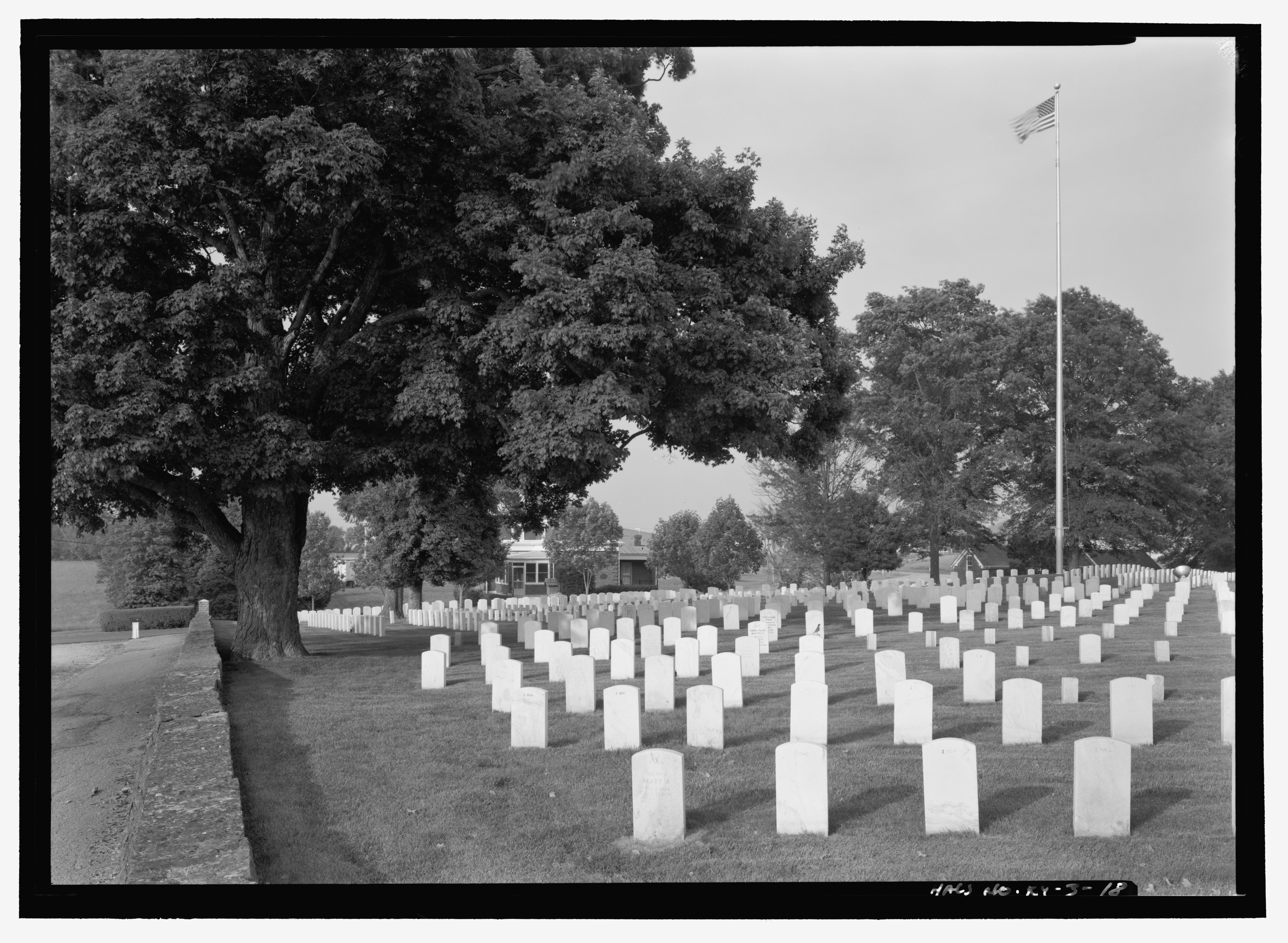
- Lebanon National Cemetery in 2004

- Location within Kentucky Location within the United States
- Location: On Kentucky Highway 208 about one mile southeast of Lebanon, Kentucky
- Coordinates: 37°33′10″N 85°16′07″W
- Area: 2.8 acres (1.1 ha)
- Built: 1863
- NRHP reference No.: 75000801
- Added to NRHP: June 05, 1975

Lebanon National Cemetery is a United States National Cemetery located just outside the city of Lebanon in Marion County, Kentucky. Administered by the United States Department of Veterans Affairs, it encompasses 14.8 acres (6.0 ha) and as of the end of 2005 it had 4,699 interments. It is administered by the Zachary Taylor National Cemetery.

== History ==
First established in 1862 as a cemetery for nearby Camp Crittenden, the Union supply depot in Lebanon, and the military hospitals in the area. It was designated a National Cemetery in 1867. Two donations of land in the 1980s expanded the cemetery to its current size.

A 2.8 acres (1.1 ha) portion of the cemetery was listed on the National Register of Historic Places in 1975, as Lebanon National Cemetery.

Numerous Union soldiers who died in the Battle of Perryville are interred there.
