= West Lebanon Historic District =

Historic district in Maine, United States

- U.S. National Register of Historic Places
- U.S. Historic district
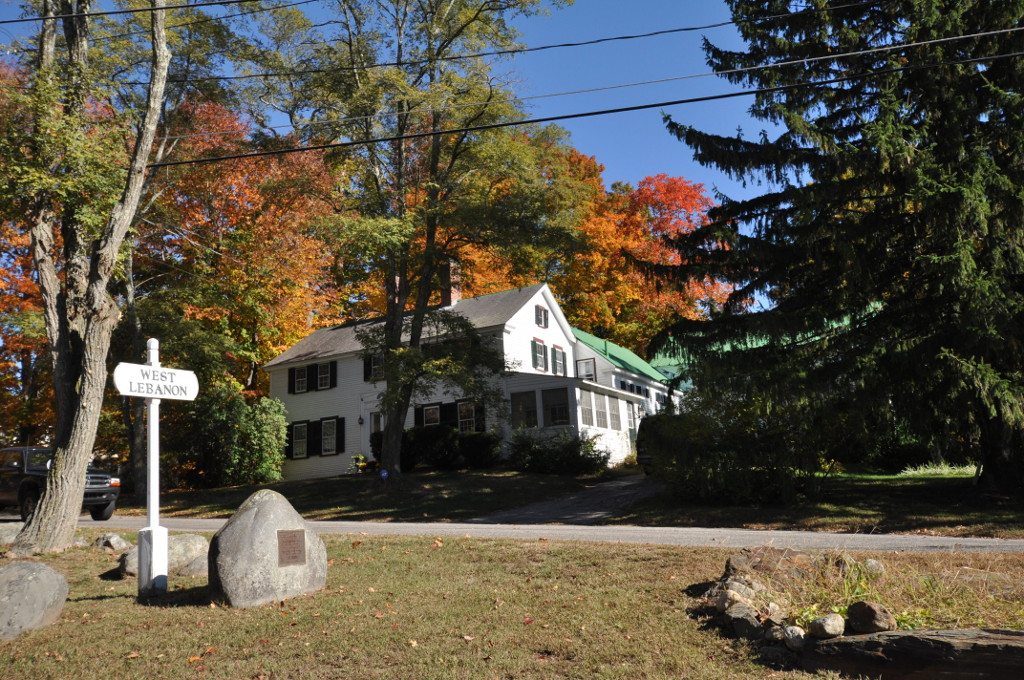

- Location within Maine Location within the United States
- Location: Irregular pattern along W. Lebanon, Rochester, Milton, Shapleigh and Meeting House Rds., West Lebanon, Maine
- Coordinates: 43°23′3″N 70°57′4″W
- Area: 55 acres (22 ha)
- Built: 1733
- Architectural style: Greek Revival, Federal
- NRHP reference No.: 75000210
- Added to NRHP: June 5, 1975

The West Lebanon Historic District encompasses a rural village center in Lebanon, Maine. Built over a period of less than 100 years between the 1770s and 1870s, the small village at the junction of West Lebanon, Shapleigh, North Rochester, Orrills Hill, and Jim Grant Roads is a well-preserved example of a 19th-century rural Maine village. It was listed on the National Register of Historic Places in 1975.

== Description and history ==
The town of Lebanon was established in 1733, and was only modestly developed prior to the 1770s. The village of West Lebanon has its origins in that time, centered on a fork in the main north-south road running west of the town center. It was at that fork (now Shapleigh and Orrills Hill Roads) that Daniel Legro opened a tavern, and his brother Thomas built a farmstead, giving the village its early name of "Legro's Corner". From this modest beginning the village grew, acquiring a Free Will Baptist church in 1801 (the current one, still standing, dates to 1832). In 1842 the local residents funded the establishment of a private academy, whose main building, built in 1849, became the town high school in the 20th century, and now serves a variety of community functions.

The district encompasses about 55 acres (22 ha) surrounding the junction of the five roads at the center of the village. Most of the buildings in the district were built before 1850, and only one was built in the 20th century. The houses are typically Federal or Greek Revival in style, 1-1/2 or 2-1/2 stories in height, of wood frame construction with clapboard siding. Some houses were enlarged and modestly restyled in the 1860s and 1870s. The district also includes the site of an early tannery.

== See also ==
- National Register of Historic Places listings in York County, Maine
