= Saint Francis, Kentucky =

Unincorporated community in Kentucky, United States

Coordinates: 37°37′35″N 85°25′40″W

Saint Francis is an unincorporated community in Marion County, in the U.S. state of Kentucky. The ZIP Code for Saint Francis is 40062.

== History ==
Saint Francis was originally called Chicago, and under the latter name was incorporated in 1870 soon after the railroad was extended to that point.
