= Lebanon Junction Historic District =

Historic district in Kentucky, United States

- U.S. National Register of Historic Places
- U.S. Historic district
- Location within Kentucky Location within the United States
- Location: Roughly bounded by Maple St., KY 61, Knoxville Ave. and Harrel and Masden Sts., Lebanon Junction, Kentucky
- Coordinates: 37°49′55″N 85°43′53″W
- Area: 60.6 acres (24.5 ha)
- Built: 1890
- Architectural style: Greek Revival, Romanesque, et al.
- NRHP reference No.: 03001224
- Added to NRHP: December 4, 2003

The Lebanon Junction Historic District, in Lebanon Junction, Kentucky, is a 60.6 acres (24.5 ha) historic district which was listed on the National Register of Historic Places in 2003.

The district included 135 contributing buildings, a contributing structure, and four contributing sites. It is roughly bounded by Maple St., KY 61, Knoxville Ave. and Harrel and Masden Streets.
