= Hudson, Kentucky =

Unincorporated community in Kentucky, United States

- Unincorporated community
- Location within Kentucky Location within the United States
- Coordinates: 37°39′04″N 86°16′36″W
- Country: United States
- State: Kentucky
- County: Breckinridge
- Elevation: 784 ft (239 m)
- Time zone: UTC-6 (Central (CST))
  - Summer (DST): UTC-5 (CDT)
- ZIP code: 40145
- Area code: 270
- GNIS feature ID: 508289

Hudson is an unincorporated community in Breckinridge County, Kentucky, United States. Hudson is located along Kentucky Route 401, 13.4 miles (21.6 km) southeast of Hardinsburg. Hudson has a post office with ZIP code 40145.

== History ==
In 1810, Joseph Hudson arrived in Breckinridge County, taking land that would forever be known as Hudson. The first settlers at Hudson were George Holmes, Rafeal Cox, Doctor George Legrand, Steve Critchelow (the father of Bill and Tom Critchelow, who ran the mill and blacksmith shop at McDaniels for 60 years), Henry Tucker, and Mac Jauncy.

Hudson loaned four of its citizens to the Union Army during the Civil War: Elza Tucker, Bill Tucker, Bill Monroe, and Nic Mercer. All returned safely.

During the Civil War, guerillas plundered all the houses in Hudson, stealing all the best horses, and woolen goods and clothing that was of any value.

Shortly after the war, Mac Jauncy built a gristmill in the forks of Calimese Creek so people of the community could grind their own meal. This gristmill was powered by a single horse, and had a long sweep pole, which was common for sorghum mills in the area. Even though Mac Jauncy wasn't present to collect any fees, every customer would leave some of their meal in a bin based on the honor system.

Doctor George Legrand was the first doctor in this part of the county. Legrand brought with him several slaves. A part of this land is still in the Legrand family (Roy Legrand).

Riley Johnson operated a distillery here until Prohibition. All of Riley Johnson's whiskey, since it had a government seal, had to be 100 proof. The whiskey was put in wooden barrels that had been charred on the inside, and hauled to Leitchfield where it was shipped.

The original house built by Joseph Hudson is still standing, and his original land is still in his 6th generation family's name. Bert Keesee now lives in the old original log homestead, and warms his feet at the same fireplace and in the same living room that Joseph Hudson built 6 generations ago.

The first school constructed in Hudson was in 1840 on top of the hill, 300 yards going towards Dyer. It was made of logs. The seats were split logs with pegs driven in them for legs. The next school for Hudson was constructed about 200 yards down Fairfield Road. This frame building gave way to the "termites, old age, and the Barlow knife". Another school was constructed in Hudson, and it was built at the top of the hill on the road towards Madrid. It was completed in 1890, the year of the big cyclone.

The last school in Hudson was built on land donated by W. H. Tucker in 1924. William Thompson taught his first school in this one-room building, having 58 students and all eight grades. This last school was abandoned in 1957, and consolidated with Custer's school. Hudson now consists merely of two stores, a Methodist church, and Masonic Lodge. W. H. Tucker has run the general store there since 1930, and his wife the post office since 1936.
