= St. Mary, Kentucky =

- Unincorporated community
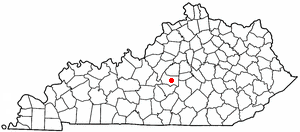
- Location within Kentucky
- Country: United States
- State: Kentucky
- County: Marion
- Settled: c. 1785
- Incorporated: 1865
- Dissolved: 1986
- Named for: a local college

Area
  - Total: 0.78 sq mi (2.03 km^{2})
  - Land: 0.78 sq mi (2.02 km^{2})
  - Water: 0.0077 sq mi (0.02 km^{2})
- Elevation: 762 ft (232 m)

Population (2020)
  - Total: 138
  - Density: 177.3/sq mi (68.46/km^{2})
- Time zone: UTC-5 (Eastern (EST))
  - Summer (DST): UTC-4 (EDT)
- ZIP code: 40063
- Area codes: 270 & 364
- FIPS code: 21-67890
- GNIS feature ID: 02797230

St. Mary is an unincorporated community and former city in Marion County, Kentucky, in the United States. As of the 2020 census, the population of the community was 138.

The formerly incorporated city was dissolved by the Marion Circuit Court in 1986, which was upheld by the Kentucky Court of Appeals later that year. The city had lain dormant for several years without electing any government, but an attempt was made in 1985 to revive the city in order to prevent the former St. Mary's College from being repurposed as a prison. The court held that this was in violation of a Kentucky law which dissolved any city which failed to maintain a government for more than one year; the city therefore no longer existed. The Kentucky Secretary of State maintains in its cities database the ordinances passed by the abortive city council in 1986.

== History ==
The town was first known as Hardin's Creek when it was settled by the Hardin family c. 1785. Catholic settlers from "Saint" Charles Co., Maryland, arrived in 1790. Their community was originally known as Saint Charles after their former home and new church.

The first Catholic settlers of the Hardin's Creek settlement were the brothers Edward Beaven and Charles Beaven from Maryland in 1786, followed by the brothers Mathew, Zachariah, Sylvester, and Jeremiah Cissell.

The community was the birthplace and hometown of George Elder, who – along with William Byrne – later returned from seminary in Maryland to found Saint Mary's College in 1821. The post office was established in 1858 as Saint Mary's for the school. The city was incorporated as St. Mary on May 26, 1865. The college closed its doors in 1976.

The city includes historical markers honoring the Sisters of Loretto and St. Mary's College.

== Geography ==
St. Mary is located on Kentucky Route 84 at 37°50′56.6″N 85°20′46.7″W (37.580711, -85.346291), 5 miles (8 km) west of Lebanon.

According to the U.S. Census Bureau, the city of St. Mary has an area of 0.79 square miles (2.05 km^{2}), of which 0.01 square miles (0.03 km^{2}), or 0.89%, are water.

== Demographics ==
Historical population
Census	Pop.	Note	%±
2020	138		—
U.S. Decennial Census

== Economy ==
Since 1980, St. Mary has been home to the 826-bed Marion Adjustment Center, a CCA-owned minimum- and medium-security facility. In June 2013, the Kentucky Department of Corrections elected not to renew the contract. At the time, the MAC employed 166 people.

== Notes ==
a: This Charles County is now known within Maryland as "Old Charles County" to distinguish it from the present Charles County. The former was named after King Charles I ("Saint Charles"), the latter after Charles Calvert, 3rd Baron Baltimore.
b: The abbreviation is the formal name, although it sometimes spelled out as "Saint Mary".
