= Marion County High School (Kentucky) =

Location
- 735 East Main Street; Lebanon, Kentucky 40033; United States
- Coordinates: 37.5774°N 85.2277°W

Information
- Type: Public, coeducational high school
- Established: 1970
- School district: Marion County Public Schools
- Principal: Robby Peterson
- Teaching staff: 37.96 (FTE)
- Grades: 9-12
- Enrollment: 695 (2023–2024)
- Student to teacher ratio: 18.31
- Colors: Maroon, silver, navy
- Slogan: "Growing Our Future... One KNIGHT at a time!"
- Athletics conference: Kentucky High School Athletic Association
- Mascot: Knights and Lady Knights
- Website: www.marion.kyschools.us/o/mchs

Marion County High School is a public, secondary school located in Lebanon, Kentucky, United States. It is the only high school in the Marion County Schools district. MCHS houses grades 9–12 and has an enrollment of 653 students.

The boundary of the school district (of which this is the sole comprehensive high school) is Marion County.

== AP courses ==
MCHS offers the following Advanced Placement courses:

- AP Language
- AP Literature
- AP Calculus
- AP European History
- AP US History
- AP Comparative Gov.
- AP Human Geography
- AP Psychology

== Career majors ==
MCHS students may elect to pursue a career major. These students take courses pertaining to a career field of interest in addition to their regular high school studies. Majors offered include agriculture education, animal science, horticulture, communication and leadership, accounting, administrative support, business management, technology education, PLTW pre-engineering, early childhood education, culinary and food services, fashion and interior design, and consumer and family management.

In addition, students may elect to pursue the following career majors at the adjacent Marion County Area Tech Center (MCATC): automotive technology, construction technology, health sciences, industrial maintenance technology, information technology, machine tool technology, and welding technology.

== Extracurricular activities ==
The following extracurricular activities are offered at MCHS:

- Academic Team
- Band
- BETA
- Family Career and Community Leaders (FCCLA)
- Future Business Leaders of America (FBLA)
- Future Farmers of America (FFA)
- Health Occupation Students of America (HOSA)
- National Honor Society (NHS)
- SkillsUSA
- Student Council
- Student Technology Leadership Program (STLP)
- Technology Student Association (TSA)
- Teen Leadership Marion County (TLMC)
- Y-Club

== Athletics ==
The Marion County Knights and Lady Knights compete in the Kentucky High School Athletic Association in the following sports:

- Baseball
- Basketball - Boys and Girls
- Cheerleading
- Cross Country - Boys and Girls
- Football
- Golf - Boys and Girls
- Soccer - Boys and Girls
- Softball
- Swimming - Boys and Girls
- Tennis - Boys and Girls
- Track - Boys and Girls
- Volleyball - Boys and Girls
