= Lebanon Commercial Historic District (Lebanon, Tennessee) =

Historic district in Tennessee, United States

- U.S. National Register of Historic Places
- U.S. Historic district
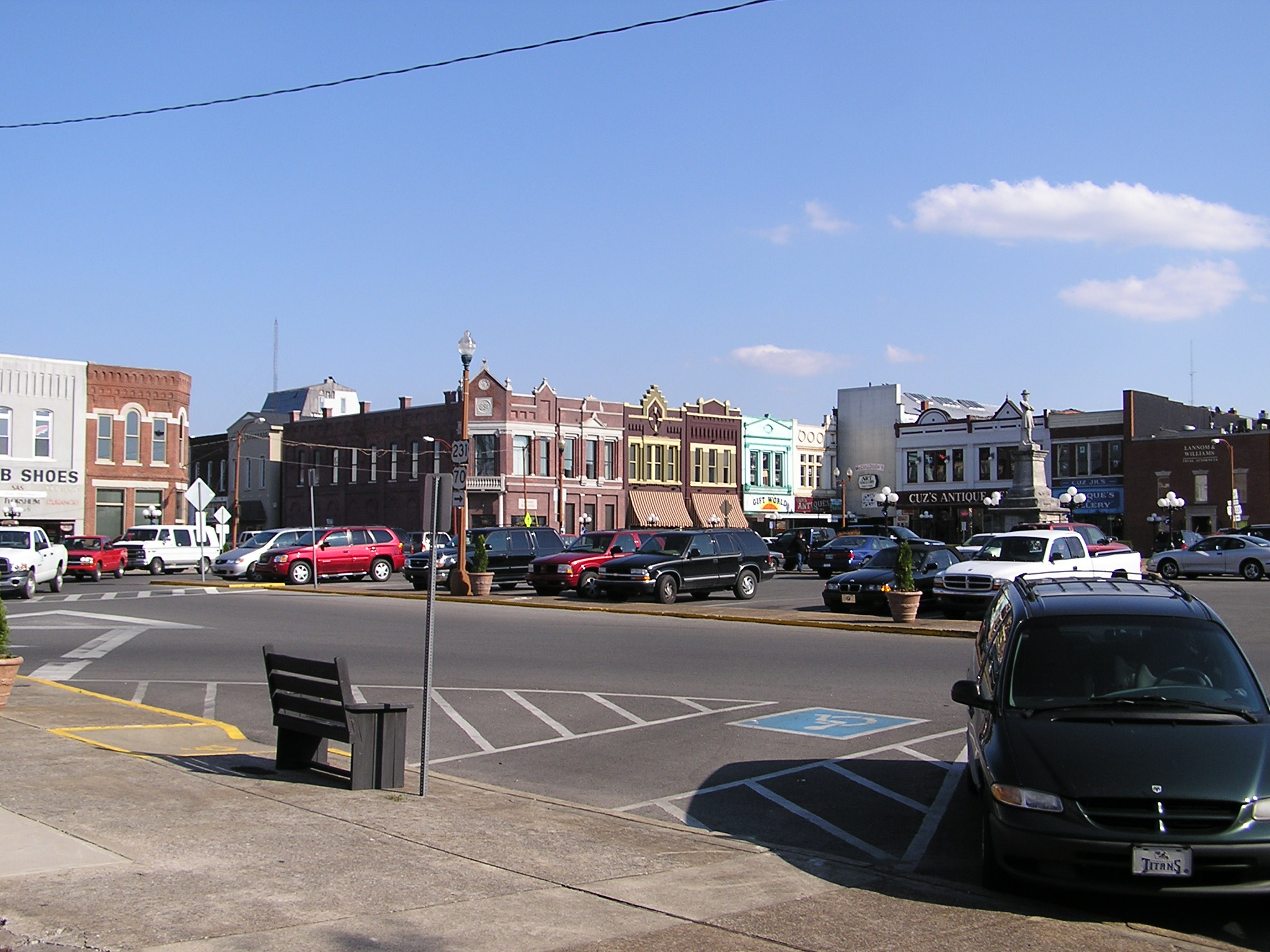

- Location within Tennessee Location within the United States
- Location: Roughly around the Public Sq., and 104-124 N. College, 105-115 N. Cumberland, 102-203 E. Main, and 103-122 E. Market St, Lebanon, Tennessee
- Coordinates: 36°12′29″N 86°17′27″W
- Area: 10 acres (4.0 ha)
- Architect: Wenderoth, Oscar; et al.
- Architectural style: Beaux Arts, Italianate
- NRHP reference No.: 99001373
- Added to NRHP: November 18, 1999

The Lebanon Commercial Historic District in Lebanon, Tennessee is a 10-acre (4.0 ha) historic district centered on the city's public square. It was listed on the National Register of Historic Places in 1999. In 1999 it included 43 contributing buildings and one other contributing structure.

The district is built on the Philadelphia Square Plan and is considered an excellent example of a commercial district from the late 19th and early 20th centuries.
