= Lebanon Historic Commercial District (Lebanon, Kentucky) =

- U.S. National Register of Historic Places
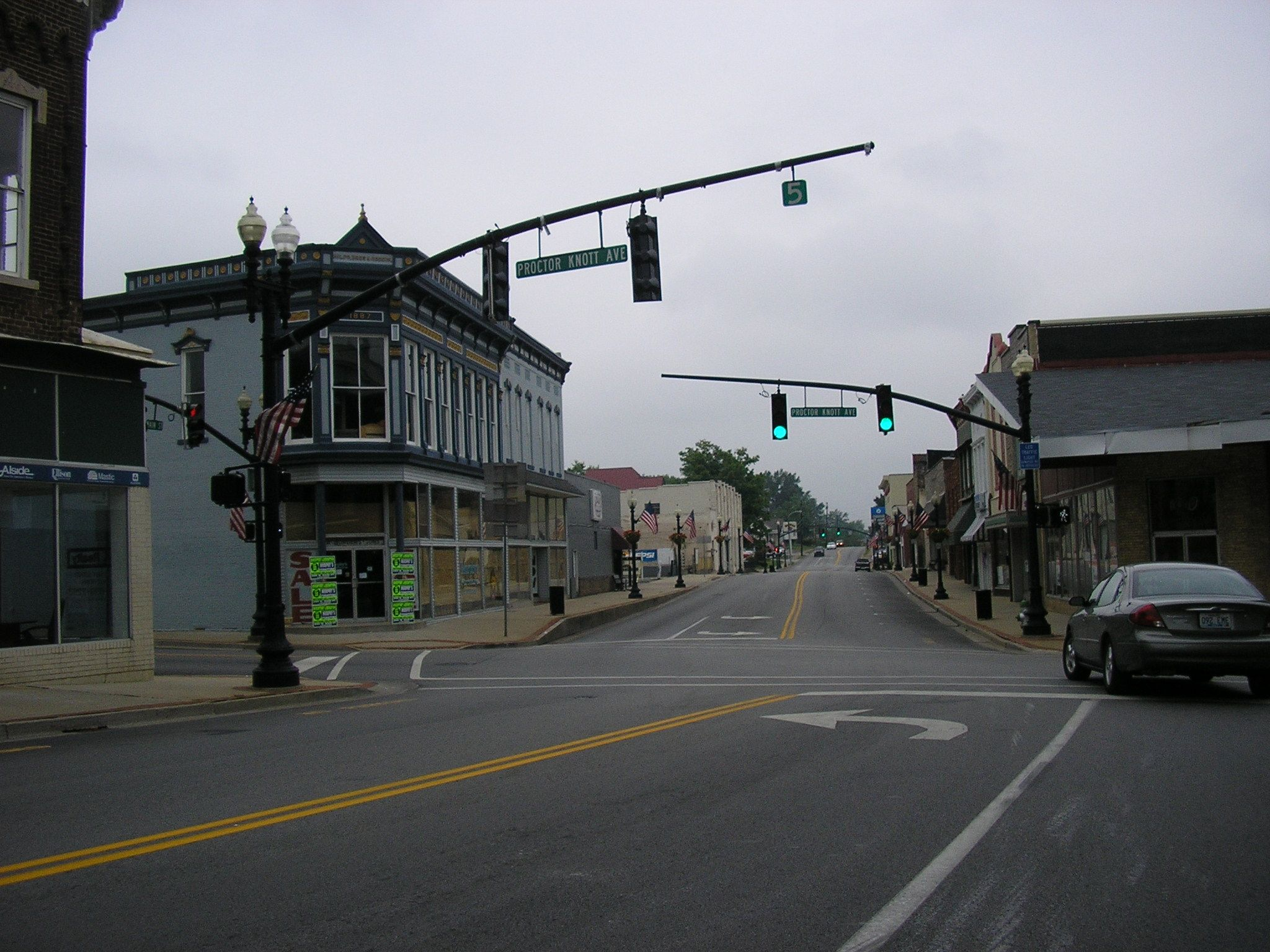
- Downtown Lebanon

- Location within Kentucky Location within the United States
- Location: Main St. roughly between Proctor Knott and Spalding Aves., Lebanon, Kentucky
- Coordinates: 37°34′10″N 85°15′10″W
- Area: 7 acres (2.8 ha)
- Built: 1850
- Architect: Nolen, Thomas; Taylor, James Knox
- Architectural style: Classical Revival, Art Deco, Italianate
- NRHP reference No.: 87000857
- Added to NRHP: November 10, 1987

The Lebanon Historic Commercial District in Lebanon, Kentucky is a 7 acres (2.8 ha) historic district which was listed on the National Register of Historic Places in 1987. It included 32 contributing buildings.

It includes:

- Marion County Courthouse (1935), a Classical Revival courthouse designed by architect Thomas Nolen, a Works Progress Administration project
- a U.S. post office designed by James Knox Taylor,
- the City Hall (1876)
- Arista Theater (c.1935), an Art Deco theatre
- "the important and rare mid-nineteenth century Court Square, a grouping of one-and two-story, mid-nineteenth to early twentieth-century professional offices

surrounding the courthouse and forming an indentation in the south side of Main Street."
