= Lebanon, Kentucky =

- City
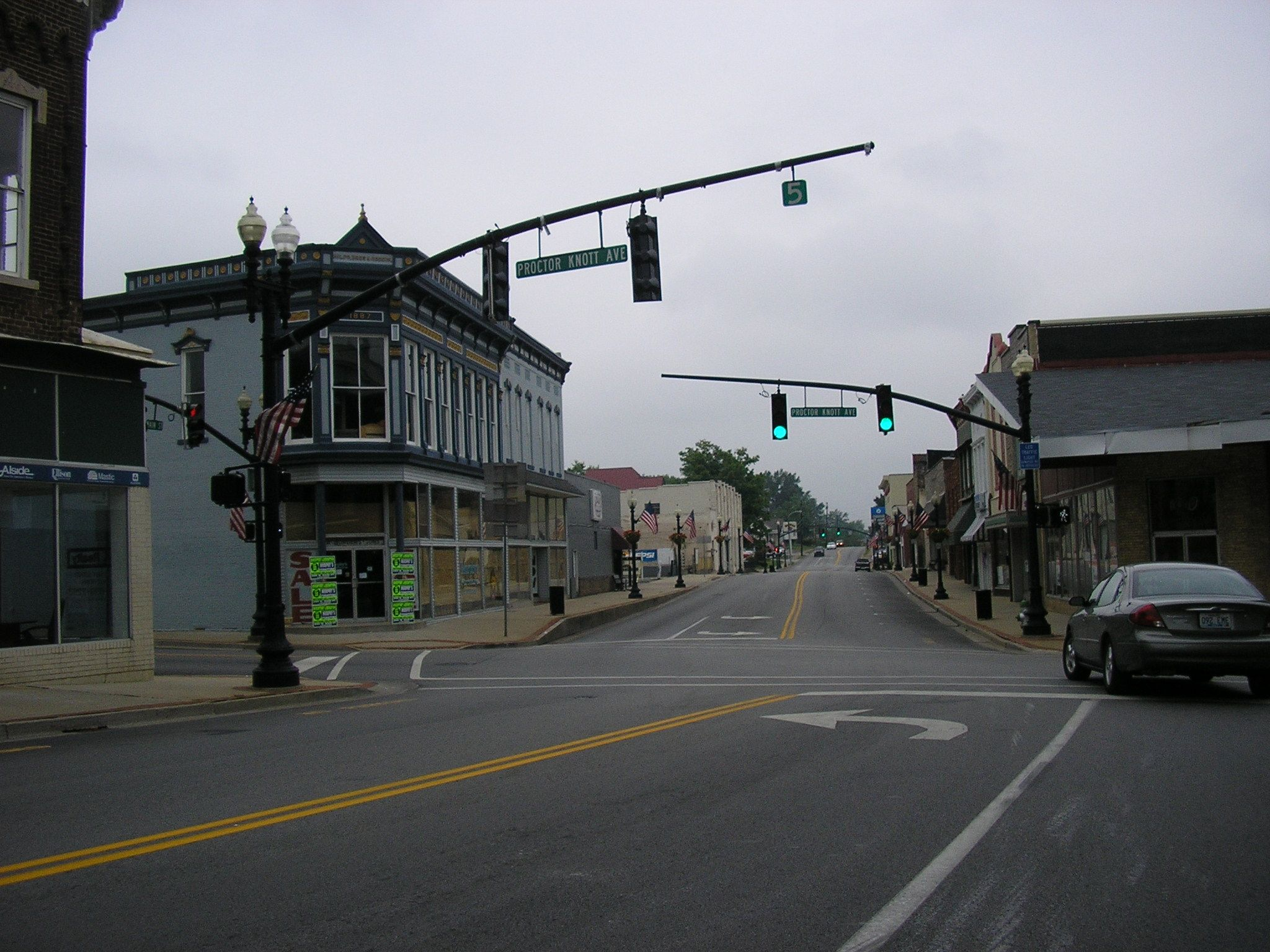
- Downtown Lebanon

- Location in Marion County, Kentucky
- Coordinates: 37°34′14″N 85°15′23″W
- Country: United States
- State: Kentucky
- County: Marion
- Named for: The biblical land famed for its cedars

Area
  - Total: 6.41 sq mi (16.59 km^{2})
  - Land: 6.37 sq mi (16.50 km^{2})
  - Water: 0.035 sq mi (0.09 km^{2})
- Elevation: 791 ft (241 m)

Population (2020)
  - Total: 6,274
  - Estimate (2022): 6,436
  - Density: 984.9/sq mi (380.28/km^{2})
- Time zone: UTC-5 (Eastern (EST))
  - Summer (DST): UTC-4 (EDT)
- ZIP code: 40033
- Area codes: 270 & 364
- FIPS code: 21-44344
- GNIS feature ID: 0496130
- Website: lebanon.ky.gov

Lebanon is a home rule-class city in and the county seat of Marion County, Kentucky, in the United States. The population was 6,274 at the 2020 census, up from 5,539 in 2010. Lebanon is located in central Kentucky, 63 miles (101 km) southeast of Louisville. A national cemetery is nearby.

== History ==
Prior to the establishment of the city now known as Lebanon, the town of Georgetown, north of Lexington, was also named "Lebanon" during its first few years of establishment. It was renamed in 1790 in honor of President George Washington.

Present-day Lebanon was established in 1814 and named for the Biblical Lebanon because of its abundant cedar trees. The founding community traces back to the Hardin's Creek Meeting House, built by Presbyterians from Virginia. It was incorporated as a city on January 28, 1815, and became the county seat of Marion County in 1835. Because of its style, architecture, and businesses, Lebanon had the reputation of being Kentucky's Philadelphia and was considered for the site of the state capitol.

In the 19th century, Lebanon was one of the stops along the National Turnpike from Maysville to Nashville. In 1819, Henry Clay and Andrew Jackson met here after having crossed paths on their journeys. Many of its brick homes date from the antebellum period, including Hollyhill and Myrtledene (now a bed and breakfast). Much of Lebanon's downtown business district was recently placed on the National Register of Historic Places.

A branch of the Louisville & Nashville Railroad was built to Lebanon in 1857, but growth of the town was halted by the Civil War. Three battles were fought nearby, and control over the railroad branch passed between Union and Confederate hands several times. After the death of his brother Tom during a local battle, Confederate John Hunt Morgan's cavalry burned the railroad depot, a hotel, and several residences on July 5, 1863, during the Battle of Lebanon.

Lebanon's Historic Homes and Landmarks Tour is also part of the Kentucky Civil War Heritage Trail and includes 24 listings. On the Civil War Discovery Trail, three landmarks stand out. The Commissary Building, which is the old Sunnyside Dispensary Building, was in place during the Civil War and supplied dry goods and food stuffs to the Union garrison in the town. The Shuck building, which is now Henning's Restaurant, was the office of General George H. Thomas, when he gathered an army of several thousand to go to Mill Springs to defend the Cumberland Valley. Myrtledene was where General John Hunt Morgan rode his horse in the house and started up the stairs. General Morgan used the property as his headquarters while he was in Lebanon. On the southern limits of Lebanon is the National Cemetery, where many of the Union soldiers who fell in the 1862 Battle of Perryville were laid to rest. The cemetery is the site of many military funerals and hosts annual Memorial Day celebrations.

The town rebounded after the war and became a trade center, but declined as railroads became less important to commerce in the 1900s. The tracks were abandoned, then eventually removed by CSX Transportation in the mid-1980s.

In the 1950s, 1960s, and early 1970s, Lebanon was known as an entertainment hotspot, as nationally known acts appeared at The Plantation, Club Cherry, Club 68, and the Golden Horseshoe nightclubs. The clubs hosted famous acts such as Ike and Tina Turner, Nat King Cole, Jerry Lee Lewis, Creedence Clearwater Revival, Steppenwolf, The Platters, the Amazing Rhythm Aces, Otis Redding, Jimi Hendrix, Little Richard, Bo Diddley, Jackie Wilson, The Supremes, Ray Charles, James Brown, Chuck Berry, Fats Domino, Sam and Dave, Wilson Pickett, B.B. King, Percy Sledge, Bobby Blue Bland and Count Basie.

== Geography ==
Lebanon is located in central Marion County at 37°34′14″N 85°15′23″W (37.570623, -85.256263). It is approximately 28 miles (45 km) west of Danville and 18 miles (29 km) north of Campbellsville. It is located at the junction of U.S. Route 68 and Kentucky Routes 55, 52, and 49. Ky. 84 intersects Ky. 49 and 52 just west of town.

According to the United States Census Bureau, the city has a total area of 6.4 square miles (16.6 km^{2}), of which 0.04 square miles (0.10 km^{2}), or 0.55%, are water. Hardins Creek runs through the southern part of the city, flowing northwest to the Beech Fork, part of the Rolling Fork and Salt River watershed leading to the Ohio River.

== Demographics ==
Historical population
| Census | Pop. | Note | %± |
|---|---|---|---|
| 1830 | 384 | | — |
| 1840 | 546 | | 42.2% |
| 1860 | 953 | | — |
| 1870 | 1,925 | | 102.0% |
| 1880 | 2,054 | | 6.7% |
| 1890 | 2,816 | | 37.1% |
| 1900 | 3,043 | | 8.1% |
| 1910 | 3,077 | | 1.1% |
| 1920 | 3,239 | | 5.3% |
| 1930 | 3,248 | | 0.3% |
| 1940 | 3,786 | | 16.6% |
| 1950 | 4,640 | | 22.6% |
| 1960 | 4,813 | | 3.7% |
| 1970 | 5,528 | | 14.9% |
| 1980 | 6,590 | | 19.2% |
| 1990 | 5,695 | | −13.6% |
| 2000 | 5,718 | | 0.4% |
| 2010 | 5,539 | | −3.1% |
| 2020 | 6,274 | | 13.3% |
| 2024 (est.) | 6,558 | | 4.5% |
U.S. Decennial Census

=== 2020 census ===
As of the 2020 census, Lebanon had a population of 6,274. The median age was 39.3 years. 23.8% of residents were under the age of 18 and 18.8% of residents were 65 years of age or older. For every 100 females there were 93.6 males, and for every 100 females age 18 and over there were 91.1 males age 18 and over.

96.9% of residents lived in urban areas, while 3.1% lived in rural areas.

There were 2,582 households in Lebanon, of which 30.1% had children under the age of 18 living in them. Of all households, 30.7% were married-couple households, 20.8% were households with a male householder and no spouse or partner present, and 40.0% were households with a female householder and no spouse or partner present. About 38.6% of all households were made up of individuals and 16.0% had someone living alone who was 65 years of age or older.

There were 2,799 housing units, of which 7.8% were vacant. The homeowner vacancy rate was 3.3% and the rental vacancy rate was 4.7%.

Racial composition as of the 2020 census
| Race | Number | Percent |
|---|---|---|
| White | 4,480 | 71.4% |
| Black or African American | 1,019 | 16.2% |
| American Indian and Alaska Native | 6 | 0.1% |
| Asian | 76 | 1.2% |
| Native Hawaiian and Other Pacific Islander | 42 | 0.7% |
| Some other race | 222 | 3.5% |
| Two or more races | 429 | 6.8% |
| Hispanic or Latino (of any race) | 434 | 6.9% |

=== 2000 census ===
As of the census of 2000, there were 5,718 people, 2,332 households, and 1,476 families residing in the city. The population density was 1,296.6 per square mile (500.6/km^{2}). There were 2,555 housing units at an average density of 579.3 per square mile (223.7/km^{2}). The racial makeup of the city was 77.88% White, 19.92% African American, 0.12% Native American, 0.73% Asian, 0.47% from other races, and 0.87% from two or more races. Hispanic or Latino of any race were 1.03% of the population.

There were 2,332 households, out of which 29.5% had children under the age of 18 living with them, 39.5% were married couples living together, 20.2% had a female householder with no husband present, and 36.7% were non-families. 33.1% of all households were made up of individuals, and 16.0% had someone living alone who was 65 years of age or older. The average household size was 2.31 and the average family size was 2.92.

In the city, the population was spread out, with 23.7% under the age of 18, 9.5% from 18 to 24, 26.8% from 25 to 44, 21.5% from 45 to 64, and 18.5% who were 65 years of age or older. The median age was 37 years. For every 100 females, there were 85.4 males. For every 100 females age 18 and over, there were 80.8 males.

The median income for a household in the city was $21,860, and the median income for a family was $26,552. Males had a median income of $25,889 versus $18,680 for females. The per capita income for the city was $14,311. About 26.7% of families and 30.3% of the population were below the poverty line, including 42.8% of those under age 18 and 20.9% of those age 65 or over.

== Education ==
All areas in Marion County are in the Marion County School District. The district's comprehensive high school is Marion County High School.

Lebanon has a lending library, the Marion County Public Library.

== School sports ==
In 1993, the Marion County High School Boys' basketball team won the KHSAA Boy's State Championship.

In 2013, the Marion County High School women's basketball team won the KHSAA Girl's State Championship. Makayla Epps also won the Herald-Leader trophy for Most Valuable Player in the game. The women's team also had an undefeated season in 2013, going 39–0. They are one of three teams in KHSAA to have an undefeated season.

In 2016, Joe Keith Bickett published "The Origins of the Cornbread Mafia"

In 2017, the Marion County High School boys baseball team made it to the semi-finals for the first time in school history.

== Culture ==
Lebanon is renowned for its Ham Days Festival and Tractor Show which is held during the last weekend of September. In 1969, the Marion County Chamber of Commerce hosted the first of the Ham Days.

== Economy ==
Diageo built a $130 million distillery in Lebanon in 2020, the distillery has 30 full-time employees.

== Portrayal in media ==
A silent documentary, Our Day, was directed by Wallace Kelly in 1938, about a day in the life of the Kelly family in Lebanon.

Call of the Wildman, an American reality television series that airs on the Animal Planet network, films near Lebanon.

== Notable people ==
- Ernie "Turtleman" Brown, reality TV star of Call of the Wildman on Animal Planet
- Walter Noble Burns, Western fiction writer
- Frank Chelf, congressman from Kentucky, 1945–1967
- Spencer Cobb, Kentucky state senator with shortest recorded tenure of any Kentucky state legislator; native of Lebanon
- George Elder, Major League Baseball player
- John Grim, Major League Baseball player
- Jimmy Higdon, Kentucky state senator since 2009; state representative, 2003–2009; native of Lebanon
- J. Proctor Knott, congressman from Kentucky; 29th governor of Kentucky, 1883–1887
- J. Mark Spalding, Bishop of Nashville, 2017–present
- Thomas A. Spragens, former president of Centre College, Danville, Kentucky (1957–1981)
- James E. Whitlock, Democrat who represented the 29th District in the Kentucky House, 1962–1967
