= Marion County, Kentucky =

County in Kentucky, United States

- County
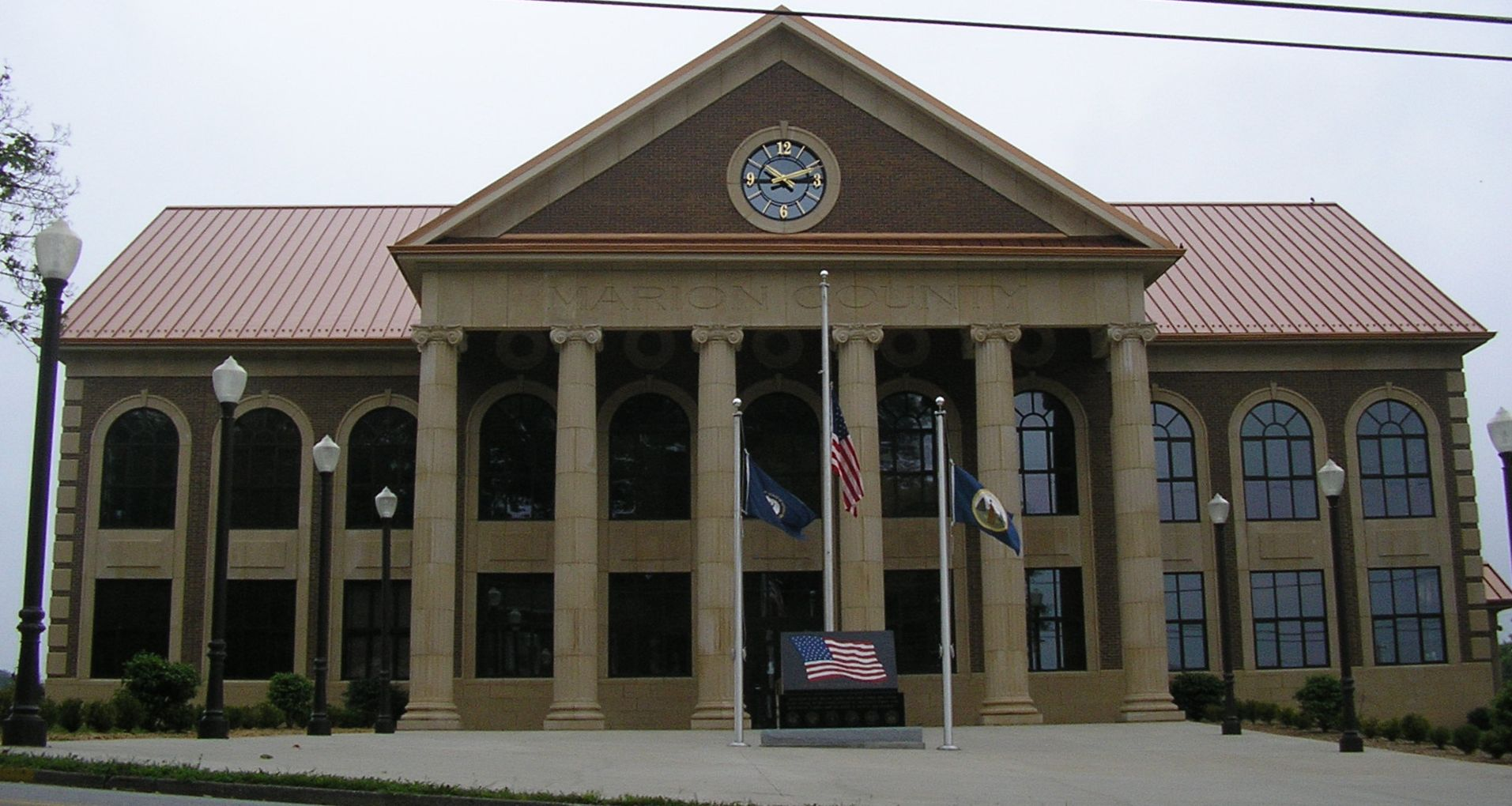
- Marion County courthouse in Lebanon

- Location within the U.S. state of Kentucky
- Coordinates: 37°33′N 85°16′W
- Country: United States
- State: Kentucky
- Founded: 1834
- Named for: Francis Marion
- Seat: Lebanon
- Largest city: Lebanon

Government
  - Judge/Executive: David R. Daugherty (D)

Area
  - Total: 347 sq mi (900 km^{2})
  - Land: 343 sq mi (890 km^{2})
  - Water: 3.9 sq mi (10 km^{2}) 1.1%

Population (2020)
  - Total: 19,581
  - Estimate (2025): 20,115 ▲
  - Density: 57.1/sq mi (22.0/km^{2})
- Time zone: UTC−5 (Eastern)
  - Summer (DST): UTC−4 (EDT)
- Congressional district: 1st
- Website: marioncounty.ky.gov

Marion County is a county in the U.S. state of Kentucky. As of the 2020 census, the total population was 19,581. Its county seat is Lebanon. The county was founded in 1834 and named for Francis Marion, the American Revolutionary War hero known as the "Swamp Fox".

== Geography ==
According to the United States Census Bureau, the county has a total area of 347 square miles (900 km^{2}), of which 343 square miles (890 km^{2}) is land and 3.9 square miles (10 km^{2}) (1.1%) is water.

Marion County was formed in 1834 from part of Washington County. Marion County is Kentucky's most Catholic county. The first Catholic settlers in Kentucky came to Holy Cross in the western part of the county circa 1790. According to planar projection maps of Kentucky, Marion County includes the center of the state of Kentucky located 3 miles NNW of Lebanon just off KY 429. The actual physical center of Kentucky is disputed by surrounding counties and due to use of planar methods and projections used when the geographic centers of the United States were initially determined.

=== Adjacent counties ===
- Washington County (north)
- Boyle County (northeast)
- Casey County (southeast)
- Taylor County (south)
- LaRue County (southwest)
- Nelson County (northwest)

== Demographics ==
Historical population
Census	Pop.	Note	%±
1840	11,032		—
1850	11,765		6.6%
1860	12,593		7.0%
1870	12,838		1.9%
1880	14,693		14.4%
1890	15,648		6.5%
1900	16,290		4.1%
1910	16,330		0.2%
1920	15,527		−4.9%
1930	15,499		−0.2%
1940	16,913		9.1%
1950	17,212		1.8%
1960	16,887		−1.9%
1970	16,714		−1.0%
1980	17,910		7.2%
1990	16,499		−7.9%
2000	18,212		10.4%
2010	19,820		8.8%
2020	19,581		−1.2%
2025 (est.)	20,115	▲	2.7%
U.S. Decennial Census; 1790-1960 1900-1990; 1990-2000 2010-2020

=== 2020 census ===
As of the 2020 census, the county had a population of 19,581. The median age was 40.5 years. 23.9% of residents were under the age of 18 and 17.3% of residents were 65 years of age or older. For every 100 females there were 98.8 males, and for every 100 females age 18 and over there were 98.2 males age 18 and over.

The racial makeup of the county was 86.6% White, 6.2% Black or African American, 0.1% American Indian and Alaska Native, 0.7% Asian, 0.2% Native Hawaiian and Pacific Islander, 1.7% from some other race, and 4.5% from two or more races. Hispanic or Latino residents of any race comprised 3.5% of the population.

31.7% of residents lived in urban areas, while 68.3% lived in rural areas.

There were 7,752 households in the county, of which 32.1% had children under the age of 18 living with them and 26.3% had a female householder with no spouse or partner present. About 29.4% of all households were made up of individuals and 12.2% had someone living alone who was 65 years of age or older.

There were 8,350 housing units, of which 7.2% were vacant. Among occupied housing units, 71.5% were owner-occupied and 28.5% were renter-occupied. The homeowner vacancy rate was 1.4% and the rental vacancy rate was 5.3%.

=== 2000 census ===
As of the census of 2000, there were 18,212 people, 6,613 households, and 4,754 families residing in the county. The population density was 53 per square mile (20/km^{2}). There were 7,277 housing units at an average density of 21 per square mile (8.1/km^{2}). The racial makeup of the county was 89.17% White, 9.12% Black or African American, 0.09% Native American, 0.43% Asian, 0.01% Pacific Islander, 0.35% from other races, and 0.82% from two or more races. 0.79% of the population were Hispanic or Latino of any race.

There were 6,613 households, out of which 35.60% had children under the age of 18 living with them, 53.80% were married couples living together, 13.70% had a female householder with no husband present, and 28.10% were non-families. 24.40% of all households were made up of individuals, and 10.10% had someone living alone who was 65 years of age or older. The average household size was 2.58 and the average family size was 3.06.

By age, 25.20% of the population was under 18, 9.90% from 18 to 24, 30.30% from 25 to 44, 21.70% from 45 to 64, and 12.80%were 65 years or older. The median age was 35 years. For every 100 females there were 102.30 males. For every 100 females age 18 and over, there were 101.60 males.

The median income for a household in the county was $30,387, and the median income for a family was $35,648. Males had a median income of $27,826 versus $20,699 for females. The per capita income for the county was $14,472. About 15.80% of families and 18.60% of the population were below the poverty line, including 21.80% of those under age 18 and 17.90% of those age 65 or over.

== Communities ==
=== Cities ===
- Bradfordsville
- Lebanon (county seat)
- Loretto

=== Unincorporated communities ===
- Gravel Switch
- Nerinx
- Raywick
- St. Mary

== Politics ==
United States presidential election results for Marion County, Kentucky
Year	Republican		Democratic		Third party(ies)	
Year	No.	%	No.	%	No.	%
1912	735	21.99%	1,848	55.30%	759	22.71%
1916	1,396	40.15%	2,063	59.33%	18	0.52%
1920	2,431	38.85%	3,807	60.83%	20	0.32%
1924	1,975	38.53%	3,055	59.60%	96	1.87%
1928	2,395	40.85%	3,461	59.03%	7	0.12%
1932	1,571	26.09%	4,427	73.53%	23	0.38%
1936	1,567	30.45%	3,526	68.52%	53	1.03%
1940	1,763	33.49%	3,482	66.15%	19	0.36%
1944	1,673	35.64%	2,996	63.83%	25	0.53%
1948	1,171	27.42%	3,008	70.43%	92	2.15%
1952	2,262	41.67%	3,159	58.19%	8	0.15%
1956	2,945	49.98%	2,927	49.68%	20	0.34%
1960	2,203	33.92%	4,292	66.08%	0	0.00%
1964	1,074	20.10%	4,265	79.81%	5	0.09%
1968	1,620	33.02%	2,436	49.65%	850	17.33%
1972	2,370	49.74%	2,351	49.34%	44	0.92%
1976	1,723	32.38%	3,520	66.14%	79	1.48%
1980	2,126	36.55%	3,577	61.50%	113	1.94%
1984	3,305	53.66%	2,835	46.03%	19	0.31%
1988	2,500	44.07%	3,152	55.56%	21	0.37%
1992	2,091	33.06%	3,403	53.81%	830	13.12%
1996	2,013	35.25%	2,922	51.17%	775	13.57%
2000	3,259	52.77%	2,778	44.98%	139	2.25%
2004	3,905	53.10%	3,399	46.22%	50	0.68%
2008	3,842	50.45%	3,596	47.22%	177	2.32%
2012	3,800	51.93%	3,418	46.71%	100	1.37%
2016	5,122	63.15%	2,679	33.03%	310	3.82%
2020	6,113	68.47%	2,722	30.49%	93	1.04%
2024	6,473	71.12%	2,513	27.61%	116	1.27%

=== Elected officials ===
Elected officials as of January 3, 2025
U.S. House	James Comer (R)	KY 1
Ky. Senate	Jimmy Higdon (R)	14
Ky. House	Michael Sarge Pollock (R)	51

== Education ==
All areas in Marion County are in the Marion County School District. The district's comprehensive high school is Marion County High School.

Lebanon has a lending library, the Marion County Public Library.

== See also ==
- National Register of Historic Places listings in Marion County, Kentucky
