= John Baptist Purcell =

Roman Catholic archbishop

His Excellency, the Most Reverend John Baptist Purcell
- Archbishop of Cincinnati
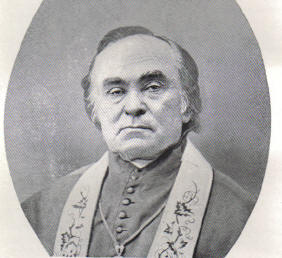
- Archdiocese: Cincinnati
- In office: 1833–1883
- Predecessor: Edward Fenwick O.P.
- Successor: William Henry Elder

Orders
- Ordination: May 26th, 1826 by Hyacinth-Louis de Quelen, COHS
- Consecration: October 13th, 1833 by James Whitfield

Personal details
- Born: February 26th, 1800 Mallow, County Cork, Ireland
- Died: July 4th, 1883 (aged 83) St. Martin, Ohio, US
- Buried: St. Martin
- Denomination: Roman Catholic
- Signature: John Baptist Purcell's signature

- Coat of arms: 140pcpx

Styles of John Baptist Purcell
- Reference style: The Most Reverend
- Spoken style: Your Excellency
- Religious style: Monsignor

John Baptist Purcell (February 26, 1800 – July 4, 1883) was an Irish-born American prelate of the Catholic Church. He served as bishop of Cincinnati in Ohio from 1833 to his death in 1883, and he was elevated to the rank of archbishop in 1850. He formed the basis of Father Ferrand, the Ohio-based "Irish by birth, French by ancestry" character in the prologue of Willa Cather's historical novel Death Comes for the Archbishop who goes to Rome asking for a bishop for New Mexico Territory.

== Early life and education ==
John Baptist Purcell was born at Mallow, County Cork, in Ireland on February 26, 1800, the son of Edward and Johanna Purcell who gave their children all the advantages of the education attainable at a time when the penal laws were less rigorously enforced. Purcell decided to seek higher education in the United States. Landing at Baltimore, Maryland, he soon obtained a teacher's certificate at Asbury College, a Methodist college in that city. He spent a year giving lessons as private tutor in some of the prominent families of Baltimore. His ambition, however, was to become a priest.

On June 20, 1820, he entered Mount St. Mary's Seminary, Emmitsburg, Maryland. His knowledge of the classics helped him take charge of important classes in the college, and at the same time prepare himself for the priesthood by the study of philosophy, theology, and other branches of the ecclesiastical curriculum.

After three years' study in the seminary he received tonsure and minor orders from Archbishop Ambrose Maréchal, of Baltimore, at the close of 1823. On March 1, 1824, in the company of Simon Gabriel Bruté, one of the professors of the seminary, afterwards first bishop of Vincennes, he sailed for Europe to complete his studies in the Sulpician Seminaries of Issy and Paris.

== Priesthood ==
On May 26, 1826, Purcell was ordained to the priesthood, along with 299 other seminarians, in the Cathedral of Notre-Dame de Paris by Archbishop Hyacinthe-Louis de Quelen.

After his ordination, Purcell continued his studies until the autumn of 1827, when he returned to the United States to enter Mount St. Mary's Seminary as professor. He afterwards became president, until his appointment as Bishop of Cincinnati, Ohio, to succeed Edward Fenwick.

== Bishop of Cincinnati ==
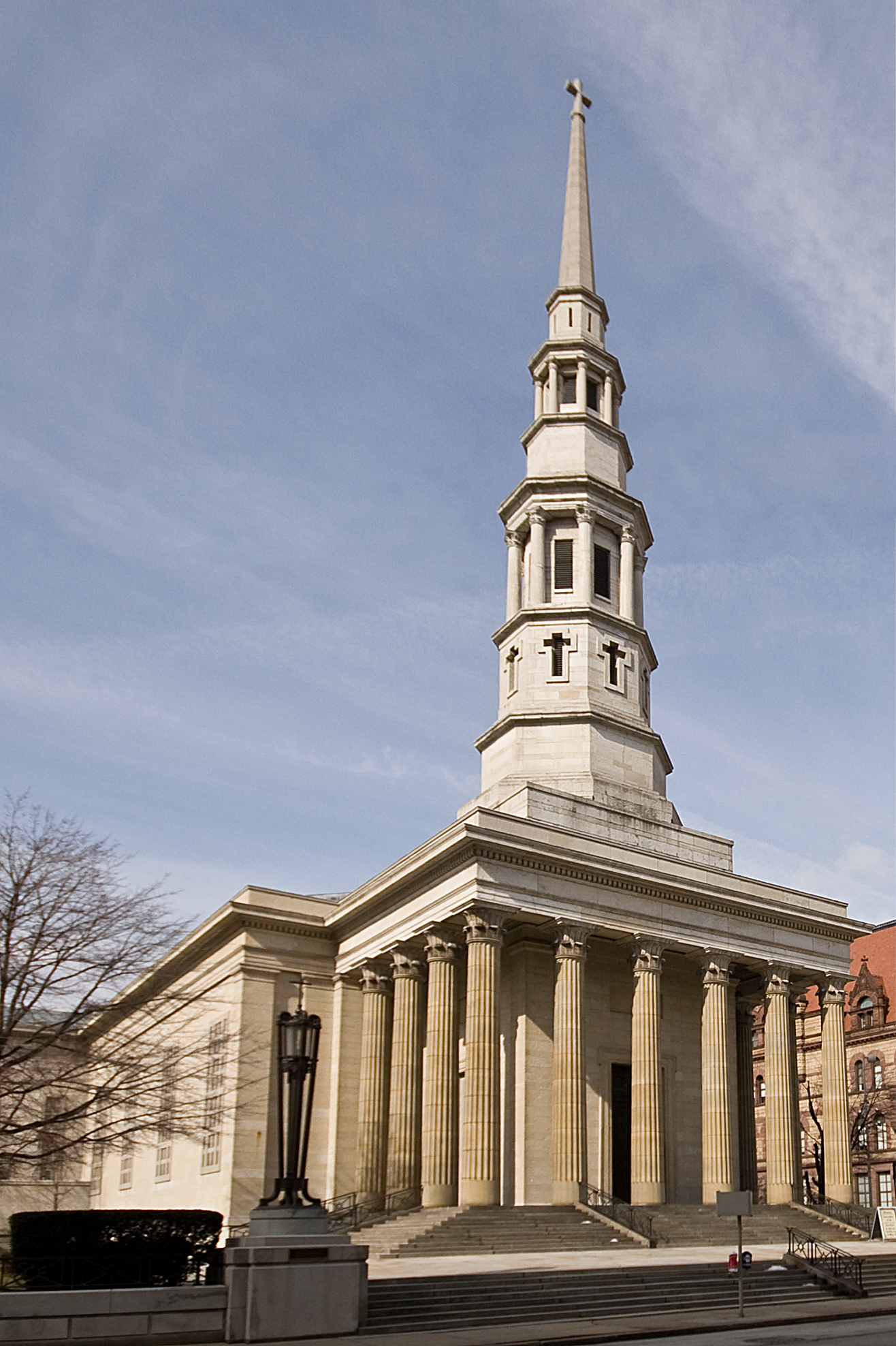
Cathedral Basilica of Saint Peter in Chains, Cincinnati, Ohio (2008)

On March 8, 1833, Pope Gregory VI appointed Purcell as bishop of Cincinnati. He received notice of his consecration in August 1833. Purcell was consecrated in the Cathedral of the Assumption of the Blessed Virgin Mary in Baltimore on October 13, 1833, by Archbishop James Whitfield. This was the same day as the opening of the Third Provincial Council of Baltimore, a meeting of bishops from around the United States.

After the end of the Council, Purcell traveled from Baltimore by stage to Wheeling in Virginia and then to Cincinnati, Ohio. Purcell reached his destination on November 14, 1833, to be greeted by Bishops Benedict Joseph Flaget, John Baptist Mary David and, Frederick Rese. Purcell was installed as bishop at Saint Peter's Cathedral in Cincinnati by Flaget.

On his arrival in 1833 Purcell found himself in a city of about 30,000 inhabitants and only one Catholic church. The diocese embraced the whole State of Ohio. The difficulties increased, for soon the tide of immigration turned towards Ohio. Immigrants from Germany and Ireland came in thousands, and as most were Catholics it became his duty to provide for their spiritual needs. A seminary had been founded by Bishop Fenwick in the Athenaeum, which stood near the cathedral, but the number of students was as yet very small. He was untiring in his labor, preaching and giving lectures, writing articles for the Telegraph, a Catholic paper founded by Father Young, a nephew of Fenwick, the first Catholic paper published in the West. He taught classes in the seminary. At his first ordination he raised to the priesthood Henry Damian Juncker, afterwards first bishop of Alton. He lost no time in providing for the wants of the growing church in Cincinnati. Holy Trinity on Fifth Street, the first church built for the German-speaking Catholics, was soon followed by another, St. Mary's, at Clay and Thirteenth Streets.

In January 1837, Purcell took part in a friendly debate in Cincinnati with the noted Protestant minister Alexander Campbell. The discussion, comparing Catholicism and Protestantism, was transcribed and published, with the proceeds going to charities of both denominations..

In order to staff the seminary and school, Purcell invited the Jesuit Fathers, to whom he entrusted St. Xavier's Church on Sycamore Street. He purchased a site for his new cathedral on Plum and Eighth Streets, and Western Row (now Central Avenue), then the western boundary of Cincinnati. Purcell began constructing a structure built of Dayton limestone, with a spire of solid stone rising to the height of 225 feet. Saint Peter in Chains Cathedral became one of the West's finest. On October 13, 1846, it was consecrated by Archbishop Samuel Eccleston of Baltimore. After trying several locations for his diocesan seminary, Purcell finally located it on Price Hill, west of the city limits. The main building was completed in 1851, and named Mount St. Mary's of the West, after his own alma mater at Emmitsburg. Purcell also established two orphan asylums, St. Aloysius's for the children of German-speaking parents, and St. Peter's (now St. Joseph's) for children of English-speakers.

He made a complete visitation of his extensive diocese the first year of his administration, placing resident pastors in parishes or having priests to visit regularly the smaller communities that were unable to support a resident pastor. Purcell made several trips to Europe, visiting the various seminaries there, and recruiting missionaries for Ohio and points further west. On one trip, Purcell returned with Joseph Projectus Machebeuf and Jean-Baptiste Lamy. Machebeuf later became the first bishop of Denver and Lamy the first archbishop of Santa Fé. In addition, pioneer missionary Stephen Badin spent his last years in the care of the cathedral.

== Archbishop of Cincinnati ==
Cincinnati was made a Metropolitan See in 1850. The pallium was conferred on Purcell by Pope Pius IX, who at the same time made him assistant at the pontifical throne. The new ecclesiastical province of Cincinnati had for suffragans the Diocese of Cleveland, Detroit, Vincennes, (became Indianapolis in 1898) and Louisville. In 1851 the city had 13 parishes and 11 parish schools, with an enrollment of 4,494 pupils.

The following religious orders came to the archdiocese during the incumbency of Purcell: the Sisters of Charity, founded at Emmitsburg, came to Cincinnati in 1829. In 1852 they formed an independent community, taking the name of the Sisters of Charity of Cincinnati. The Sisters of Notre Dame de Namur, Belgium, came from Belgium in 1840. The Precious Blood Fathers came to Ohio in 1840. The Franciscan Fathers came to the diocese in 1844; the Ursuline Sisters, from France and Germany in 1845; the Good Shepherd Sisters in 1857; the Sisters of Mercy in 1858; Little Sisters of the Poor in 1868; Sisters of the Poor of St. Francis in 1858; Ladies of the Sacred Heart in 1869 and the Passionist Fathers in 1870.

=== Response to Anti-Catholicism ===
During the 1840s and 1850s, the rapid increase of Catholic immigrant populations in American cities heighten fears among Protestant workers of losing their jobs. Nativist organizations such as the Know Nothing Party worked to inflame these tensions by printing anti-Catholic literature and capitalizing on local controversies. In early 1853, Purcell alienated many Cincinnati Protestants by arguing that the city should not tax Catholics to support public schools as their children were attending Catholic schools. Later that year, Purcell invited Cardinal Gaetano Bedini, the emissary of Pope Pius IX, to visit Cincinnati.

Many German Protestants in Cincinnati hated Bedini. They were so-called "Forty-Eighters", people who had fled the German states after the suppression of the revolutions of 1848 to 1849. During that time period, Bedini had played a role in overthrowing the short-lived Roman Republic in the Papal States. Seizing the opportunity, nativist groups started inflaming the situation. On December 25, 1853, 500 German men and 100 women on marched on Purcell's residence, where Bedini was staying. The crowd was met there by 100 Cincinnati policemen. When a shot was fired, a riot ensued. One demonstrator was killed, 15 demonstrators and two police were wounded, and 60 demonstrators were arrested.

=== Slavery ===
Purcell condemned slavery only in the "abstract" and emphasized the "prudential motives" that made its abolition ill-advised in his opinion. However, after the start of the American Civil War in April 1861, he was the first bishop in the United States to publicly call for the immediate emancipation of any and all enslaved African-Americans.

In 1869, Purcell attended the Council of the Vatican, and in the discussion of Papal Infallibility he took the side of the minority which opposed the opportuneness of the decision.

== Later years ==
Purcell celebrated his golden jubilee of priesthood 26 May 1876. Bishops and archbishops came personally or sent representatives. He had reason to rejoice when he saw the result of his work. When he came to Cincinnati he found a small city with but one church, and a diocese with a few Catholics scattered through the state. After 43 years of toil he found the city grown to a population of nearly 300,000, with 40 well-organized parishes having schools giving Catholic education to 20,000 children, a well-equipped seminary, colleges, and charitable institutions to take care of the poor and sick.

Throughout the diocese were well-organized parishes, churches, and parish schools. Forty years before he had only a few priests; in 1876 he could count on the help of 150 diocesan and 50 regular priests, and a Catholic population of 150,000. In reply to the addresses of congratulation on the occasion, he modestly referred the success to the cordial assistance of the priests and the generous aid of the laity. The serious financial disaster that clouded his last years came as a result of his natural brother and fellow priest, Father Edward Purcell, as well as the long-lasting effects of the Panic of 1873, also known as the Long Depression. Father Purcell took deposits from people who mistrusted banks, which were unstable institutions until the general government adopted national banking regulation. The Cincinnati crash or scandal occurred in the autumn of 1878, shortly after the Great Railroad Strike of 1877 was suppressed. The archbishop died five years later, in St. Martin, Ohio, on July 4, 1883.

After 14 years of litigation and mismanagement of assignees, the affair came to an end when the court found the amount due (with compound interest) from the cathedral and diocesan institutions to be $140,000. Archbishop William Henry Elder, who succeeded Archbishop Purcell, accepted the findings in 1892 and assessed parishes to meet the loans made to pay the judgment, and all the loans were repaid.

== Notes ==
Catholic Church titles
Preceded by Edward Fenwick	Bishop & Archbishop of Cincinnati; 1833–1883	Succeeded by William Henry Elder
