= List of Decrees of First Plenary Council in Baltimore (1852) =

This is a list of the decrees of the First Plenary Council in Baltimore of the American Catholic Church. Meeting in 1852 in Baltimore, Maryland, the council was the first national gathering of all American bishops, archbishops, and leaders of major religious orders. The conference published the decrees listed in this article to serve as policies and procedures for Catholic leaders and laypeople in the United States.

Decrees of the First Plenary Council
Decrees for all Catholics
These decrees are binding as soon as they are published by the Archbishop of Baltimore after their revision and approval by the Holy See.
The Fathers profess their allegiance to the pope as the divinely constituted head of the Church, whose office it is to confirm his brethren in the Faith. They also declare their belief in the entire Catholic Faith as explained by the ecumenical councils and the constitutions of the Roman pontiffs.
The enactments of the seven provincial councils of Baltimore are obligatory for all the dioceses of the United States.
The Roman Ritual, adopted by the First Council of Baltimore, is to be observed in all dioceses, and all are forbidden to introduce customs or rites foreign to the Roman usage. Sacred ceremonies are not to be employed in the burial of Catholics whose bodies are deposited in sectarian cemeteries; or even in public cemeteries, if there be Catholic cemeteries at hand.
The Baltimore "Ceremonial" is to be used all through the country.
Decrees for bishops and archbishops
Bishops are to observe the canons concerning ecclesiastical residence.
Bishops are exhorted to choose consultors from among their clergy and to ask their advice in the government of the diocese. A monthly meeting of these consultors to discuss diocesan affairs is praiseworthy.
A chancellor should be constituted in every diocese, for the easier and more orderly transaction of business.
Bishops should appoint censors for books relating to religion.
Bishops are exhorted to have a Catholic school in every parish and the teachers should be paid from the parochial funds.
The bishops or their delegates should demand every year an account of the administration of church funds from those who administer them, whether laymen or clerics.
The bishops or their delegates should demand every year an account of the administration of church funds from those who administer them, whether laymen or clerics.
Bishops should use their influence with the civil authorities to prevent anyone in the army or navy from being obliged to attend a religious service repugnant to his conscience.
A petition should be addressed to the Holy See asking for extraordinary faculties concerning matrimonial cases and the power, also, of delegating such faculties.
Our quasi-parishes should have well-defined limits, and the jurisdiction and privileges of pastors should be indicated by the bishops. The ordinary can change these limits and it is his right to appoint the incumbents.
A Society for the Propagation of the Faith, similar to that in France, should be fostered and extended.
Decrees for priests
European priests desiring to be received into an American diocese must have written testimonials from their former bishops and the consent of the ordinary here.
After next Easter, matrimonial banns must be published, and bishops should dispense with this only for grave reasons.
Pastors themselves should teach Christian doctrine to the young and ignorant.
When the title to a church is in the bishop's name, pastors are warned not to appoint trustees or permit them to be elected without the bishop's authority.
Benediction of the Blessed Sacrament must be performed in all dioceses in the manner prescribed by the Baltimore "Ceremonial".
Decrees for lay people
Laymen are not to take any part in the administration of church affairs without the free consent of the bishop. If they usurp any such authority and divert church goods to their own use or in any way frustrate the will of the donors; or if they, even under cover of the civil law, endeavour to wrest from the bishop's hands what has been confided to his care, then such laymen by that very fact fall under the censures constituted by the Council of Trent against usurpers of ecclesiastical goods.
The faithful are exhorted to enter into a society of prayer for the conversion of non-Catholics.
The sixth decree of the Seventh Provincial Council of Baltimore is to be understood as applying to those who rashly (temere) marry before a Protestant minister. Priests should give no benediction to those whom they know to intend to remarry before a preacher, or who, having done so, show no signs of penitence.

== See also ==
- Plenary Councils of Baltimore
- Roman Catholic Archdiocese of Baltimore
- History of the Catholic Church in the United States
