= Samuel Eccleston =

American archbishop

The Most Reverend Samuel Eccleston PSS
- Fifth Archbishop of Baltimore
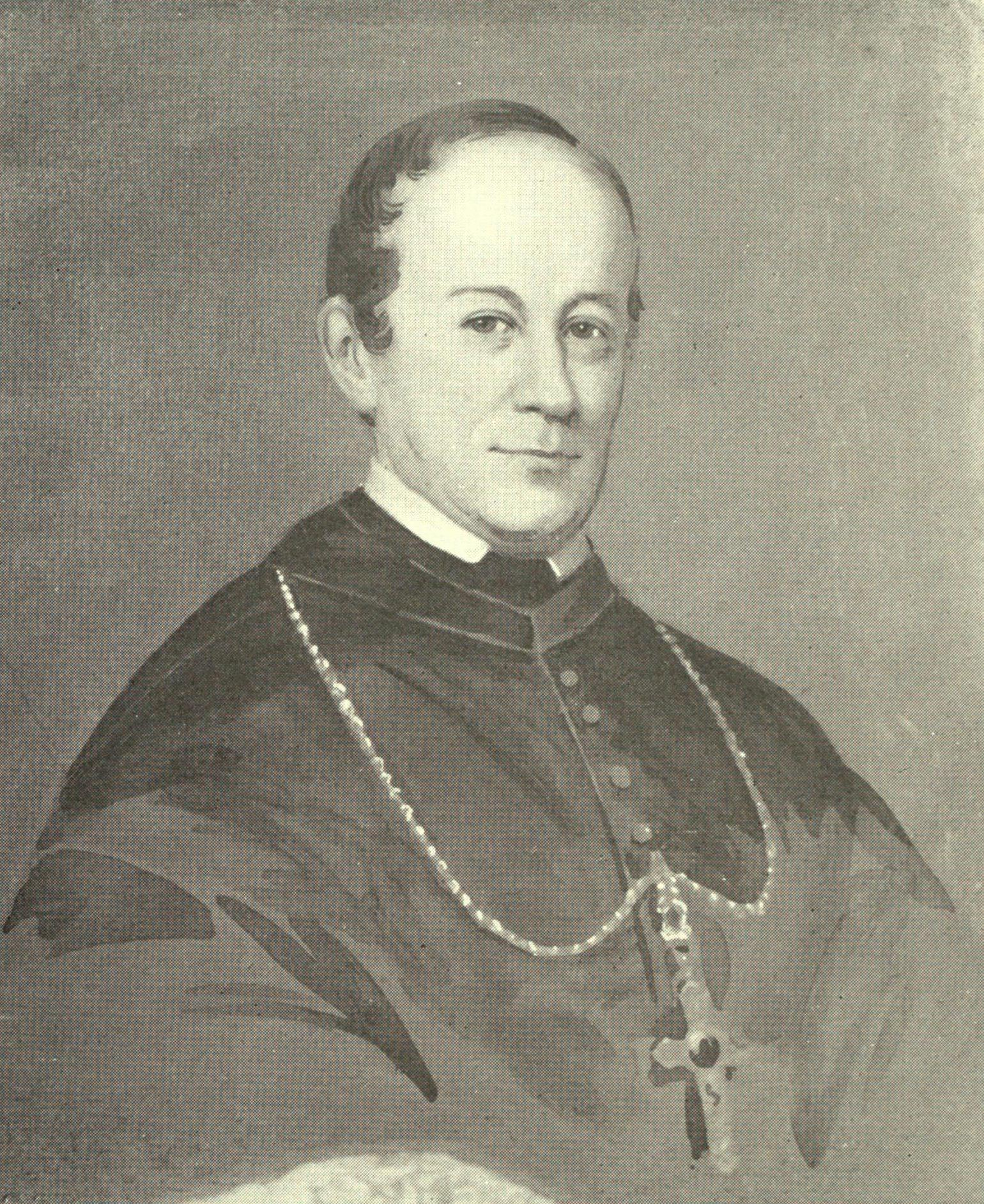
- See: Archdiocese of Baltimore
- Appointed: March 11, 1834 (coadjutor)
- Installed: October 19, 1834
- Term ended: April 22, 1851
- Predecessor: James Whitfield
- Successor: Francis Kenrick
- Previous post: Apostolic Administrator of the Diocese of Richmond (1835–1840)

Orders
- Ordination: April 24, 1825 by Ambrose Maréchal
- Consecration: September 14, 1834 by James Whitfield

Personal details
- Born: June 27, 1801 Chestertown, Maryland
- Died: May 22, 1851 (aged 49) Georgetown, Washington, D.C.
- Denomination: Roman Catholic Church
- Parents: Samuel Eccleston and Martha Hyson
- Education: St. Mary's Seminary; Grand Seminary of Saint-Sulpice

Samuel Eccleston PSS (June 27, 1801 – April 22, 1851) was an American Catholic prelate who served as archbishop of Baltimore from 1834 until his death in 1851. He was a member of the Sulpicians.

A convert to Catholicism as a young man, Eccleston attended St. Mary's Seminary in Baltimore, was ordained to the priesthood and then entered the Sulpician Order. After attending seminary in France, he served as a teacher and later president of St. Mary's Seminary in Baltimore. Eccleston was named Coadjutor Archbishop of Baltimore by the Vatican and then became Archbishop of Baltimore.

Eccleston is known for inviting several men's and women's Catholic religious orders into the archdiocese to establish seminaries, schools, and parishes for the rapidly expanding Catholic population. In recent years, he has been criticized for his efforts to disband an African-American religious community in the archdiocese.

== Biography ==
=== Early life and education ===
Samuel Eccleston was born on June 27, 1801, near Chestertown, Maryland, to Samuel and Martha (née Hyson) Eccleston. His father, who had three children from a previous marriage, was an Episcopalian clergyman. After Samuel Eccleston Sr died, Martha Eccleston married a Catholic man.

The family sent Samuel Eccleston to St. Mary's College in Baltimore, which was staffed by priests from the Sulpician Order. Inspired by how one of his teachers at St. Mary's faced death, Eccleston entered the Catholic Church on May 29, 1819. Despite vigorous protests from his family and friends, Eccleston decided to enter the priesthood, enrolling at St. Mary's Seminary in Baltimore in July 1819.

=== Ordination and ministry ===
Eccleston was ordained a priest for the Sulpicians by Archbishop Ambrose Maréchal on April 24, 1825. After entering the Sulpician Order later that year, his superiors sent Eccleston to study at the Grand Seminary of Saint-Sulpice in Issy-les-Moulineaux, France. After visiting England and Ireland, Eccleston returned to Baltimore in July 1827. The Sulpicians then assigned him as a faculty member and vice president of St. Mary's Seminary. Two years later they named him president of the seminary.

=== Coadjutor Archbishop and Archbishop of Baltimore ===
On March 4, 1834, Pope Gregory XVI appointed Eccleston as coadjutor archbishop of Baltimore and titular archbishop of Thermae Basilicae to assist Archbishop James Whitfield in his duties. Eccleston received his episcopal consecration on September 14, 1834, from Whitfield, with Bishops Benedict Flaget and Francis Kenrick serving as co-consecrators, in the Cathedral of the Assumption of Mary in Baltimore.

When Whitfield died on October 19, 1834, Eccleston automatically succeeded him as the fifth archbishop of Baltimore. At age 34, he became the youngest cleric to become archbishop in the archdiocese's history.

In 1835, the Vatican named Eccleston as apostolic administrator of the Diocese of Richmond, which had been administered by the Archdiocese of Baltimore since 1822. Eccleston received the pallium, a vestment worn by metropolitan bishops, on November 1, 1835. After the Vatican appointed Reverend Richard Whelan as bishop of Richmond in 1840, Eccleston was relieved of his duties as apostolic administrator.

Eccleston encouraged religious orders to establish houses in his diocese, particularly those who could provide social services to the growing number of Catholic immigrants in the industrializing cities. In 1840, with Eccleston's support, the Sisters of Charity opened Mount Hope Hospital in Baltimore for patients with mental disorders. The Brothers of St. Patrick came to the archdiocese in 1846 to direct a trade school near Baltimore, and the Redemptorists cared particularly for German-speaking immigrants.

Eccleston contacted the Brothers of the Christian Schools in Canada, asking them to start a Catholic boys school in Baltimore. They sent several monks there to found Calvert Hall School, the first Christian Brothers school in the United States. It opened in 1845 in the parish hall of the former St. Peter's Pro-Cathedral in Baltimore. In 1846, Eccleston requested that the Brothers of Saint Patrick take over the Baltimore Manual Labor School for indigent boys.

In 1848, the Sulpician Order opened St. Charles College, a minor seminary for those studying for the priesthood, in Howard County, Maryland. Eccleston requested that the Sisters of the Visitation staff girls schools in the archdiocese. The order took over an existing school in Frederick, Maryland in 1846, becoming the Visitation Academy of Frederick. The order established Mount de Sales Academy in Catonsville, Maryland in 1852.

In contrast to his support for other religious orders, Eccleston provided little support for the Oblate Sisters of Providence, a religious community of African American women supervised by the Sulpician Order. When the Oblate spiritual director died in 1841, Eccleston refused to replace him. Over the following years, Eccleston and other diocesan officials rarely visited the order. Feeling neglected by the Sulpicians and Eccleston, many of the sisters turned to the Redemptorist Order for spiritual support. The Redemptorists had come to the archdiocese primarily to set up German-language parishes for German immigrants. On October 7, 1847, Eccleston decided to disband the Oblates. Two days later, the Redemptorist priest Thaddeus Anwander, at the encouragement of his superiors, begged Eccleston to appoint him as the Oblates spiritual adviser. He finally gave in and gave Anwander the position.

Between 1837 and 1849, Eccleston held five Provincial Councils of Baltimore. He invited Pope Pius IX, who had been forced to flee Rome by revolutionaries in 1848, to preside over the Seventh Provincial Council in 1849.

=== Death and legacy ===
Eccleston died on April 22, 1851, in Washington at age 49. He is buried in the crypt of the Basilica of the National Shrine of the Assumption of Mary in Baltimore.

== See also ==
- Catholic Church hierarchy
- Catholic Church in the United States
- Historical list of the Catholic bishops of the United States
- List of Catholic bishops of the United States
- Lists of patriarchs, archbishops, and bishops

Catholic Church titles
Preceded by James Whitfield	Archbishop of Baltimore; October 19, 1834 – April 22, 1851	Succeeded by Francis Patrick Kenrick
