= James Whitfield (bishop) =

English-born Catholic prelate (1770–1834)

The Most Reverend James Whitfield PSS
- Archbishop of Baltimore
- See: Baltimore
- Appointed: January 8, 1828 (Coadjutor)
- Installed: May 25, 1828
- Term ended: October 19, 1834
- Predecessor: Ambrose Maréchal, PSS
- Successor: Samuel Eccleston, PSS
- Previous posts: Apostolic Administrator of Richmond (1828–1834); Coadjutor Archbishop of Baltimore (1828); Titular bishop of Appolonia (1828)

Orders
- Ordination: July 24, 1809 by Claude Simon
- Consecration: May 25, 1828 by Benedict Joseph Flaget, PSS

Personal details
- Born: November 3, 1770 Liverpool, Lancashire, England
- Died: October 19, 1834 (aged 63) Baltimore, Maryland, U.S.
- Buried: Basilica of the National Shrine of the Assumption of the Blessed Virgin Mary, Baltimore, Maryland, United States
- Motto: Auspice Maria (Under the protection of Mary)

James Whitfield, PSS (November 3, 1770 – October 19, 1834) was an English-born Catholic prelate who served as archbishop of Baltimore from 1828 until his death in 1834. He was a member of the Sulpicians.

A businessman from a wealthy English family, Whitfield enter a Catholic seminary in France as an adult in the early 1800s and was ordained a priest in the Sulpician Order in 1809. After serving as a priest in England for several years, he traveled to Maryland in 1817 to serve in the Diocese of Baltimore. He was rector of the cathedral and vicar general of archdiocese until being appointed archbishop in 1828.

Whitfield is known for hosting the first two provincial councils of American bishops, where policies for running the new American Catholic Church were established. He is also known for spending his personal fortune to build churches and sponsor priests, and for his assistance to the African-American community.

== Biography ==
=== Early life ===
James Whitfield was born on November 3, 1770, in Liverpool, England, to James and Ann (née Genders) Whitfield. His father was a successful merchant who educated his son in business. After James Whitfield senior died in 1787, James Whitfield junior and his mother traveled to Italy in hopes of improving her health. While in Italy, Whitfield worked in commercial business. During the early 1800s, the Whitfields decided to return to England. However, while traveling in France, the mother and son were detained in Lyon because France, then at war with England, had banned travel there.

In Lyon, Whitfield met Reverend Ambrose Maréchal, a French priest with the Sulpician Order who was teaching at their seminary in the city. Inspired by Maréchal to enter the priesthood, Whitfield started studying theology at the seminary, where he was considered an outstand student.

=== Priesthood ===
Whitfield was ordained to the priesthood in Lyon by Bishop Claude Simon on July 24, 1809. His mother died soon afterwards. By 1811, Whitfield was able to return to England, where the Sulpicians assigned him as pastor of St Benet's Chapel in Netherton.

In 1817, Whitfield accepted an invitation from Maréchal, now archbishop of Baltimore, to come to the United States. After arriving in Maryland in September 1817, Maréchal assigned him to the pastoral staff of St. Peter's Church in Baltimore. Whitfield also served as a curate and then rector of the Cathedral of the Assumption of the Blessed Virgin Mary in Baltimore. Maréchal named him vicar general of the archdiocese in 1818. In 1825, Whitfield received a Doctor of Divinity degree by special indult from the Vatican.

On January 8, 1828, Pope Leo XII appointed Whitfield as coadjutor archbishop of Baltimore and titular archbishop of Apollonia to assist a gravely ill Maréchal. However, on January 29, before Whitfield could be consecrated as adjutor, Maréchal died.

=== Archbishop of Baltimore ===
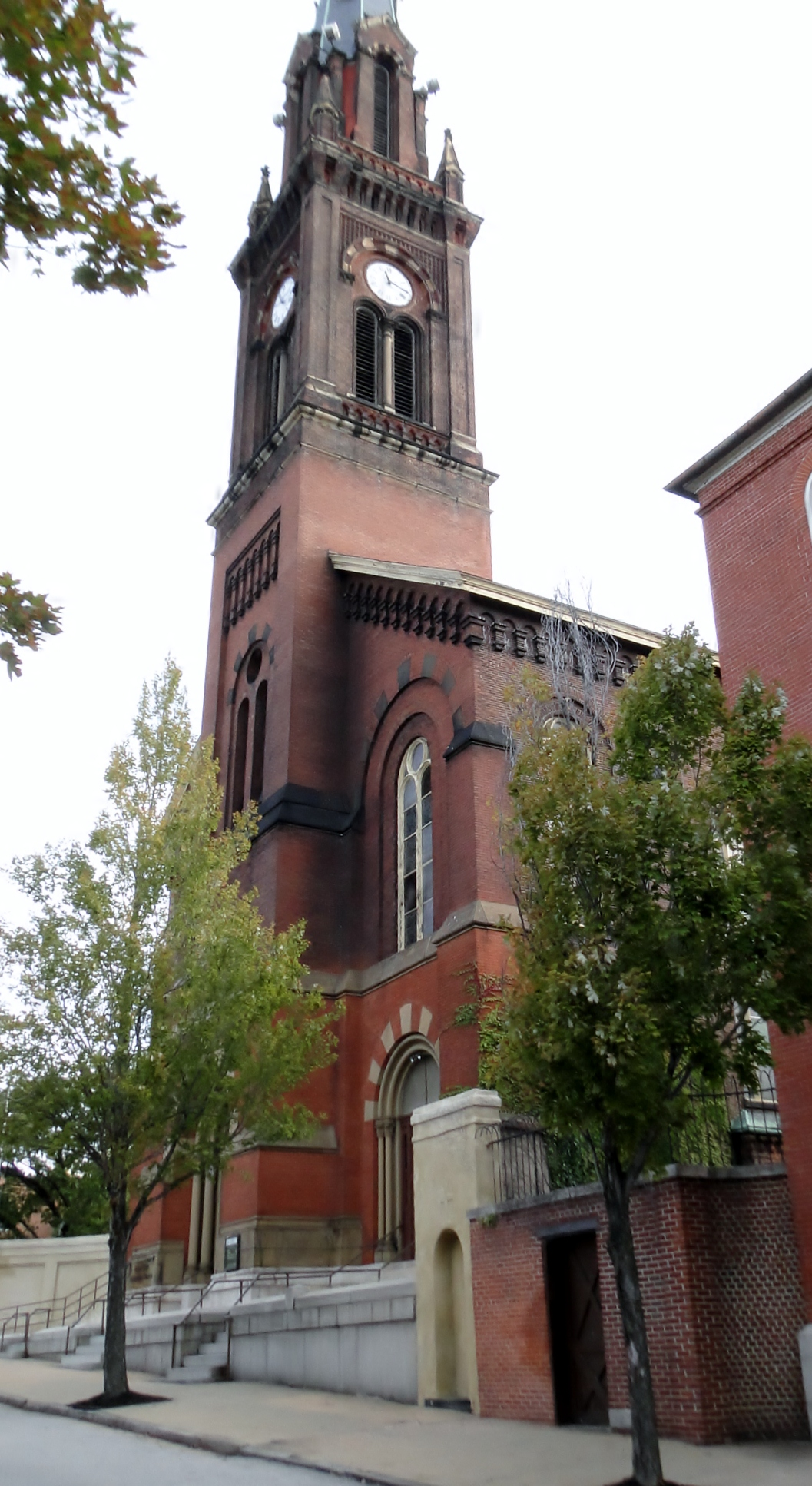
St. James the Lesser Church, Baltimore, Maryland (2012)

Whitfield was consecrated as the fourth archbishop of Baltimore on May 25, 1828, by Bishop Benedict Flaget, with Bishops Henry Conwell and John Dubois serving as co-consecrators, at Assumption Cathedral. In addition to his duties as archbishop, the Vatican appointed Whitfield as apostolic administrator of the Diocese of Richmond, holding that post from 1828 to 1834. Also in 1828, Whitfield laid the cornerstone of a building to house the St. Mary's Catholic Female Orphan Asylum in Baltimore.

On October 4, 1829, Whitfield opened the First Provincial Council of Baltimore, the first meeting of American Catholic prelates to establish policies for the American Catholic Church. On that first day of the council, Whitfield was awarded his pallium from the pope.

When Whitfield became archbishop, the archdiocese comprised around 87,000 Catholics and 52 priests. Whitfield used his personal wealth to build churches in the archdiocese, He also appealed for donations from King Louis XVIII of France and his successor, King Charles X, both of whom sent money to the archdiocese. During his period, Whitfield used his own funds to build a residence for the archbishop. He convened a synod for the diocesan clergy in 1831. Whitfield convened the Second Provincial Council of Baltimore of American bishops in 1833.

Throughout his tenure, Whitfield worked for the welfare of the African American community. He supported and authorized the foundation in the archdiocese of the Oblate Sisters of Providence, a religious community of African-American women. He once said:

How distressing it is to be unable to send missionaries to Virginia, where there are five hundred thousand Negroes! It is indubitable that had we missionaries and funds to support them, prodigies would be effected in this vast and untilled field. In Maryland blacks are converted every day, and many of them are good Catholics and excellent Christians. At Baltimore many are frequent communicants, and three hundred or four hundred receive the Blessed Sacrament the first Sunday of every month. It is the same throughout Maryland, where there are a great many Catholics among the Negroes.

At one point, a community of Carmelite sisters in Port Tobacco, Maryland, were experiencing great financial difficulties. Whitfield facilitated their move to Baltimore, where they were able to start a girls school that provided them income. In 1832, Baltimore experienced a cholera outbreak. Two priests and three sisters, including an Oblate sister, died while attending to the sick. When Whitfield was struck by cholera, Sister Anthony Duchemin from the Oblate Sisters, the order he had founded, nursed him back to health. In 1833, Whitfield laid the cornerstone for St. James the Less Roman Catholic Church in Baltimore, which he paid for at his own expense.

=== Death and legacy ===
With his health failing, Whitfield requested that the Vatican appoint a coadjutor archbishop to assist him. On March 4, 1834, Pope Gregory XVI appointed Reverend Samuel Eccleston as coadjutor archbishop of Baltimore. James Whitfield died on October 19, 1834, at age 64.

== See also ==
- Catholic Church hierarchy
- Catholic Church in the United States
- Historical list of the Catholic bishops of the United States
- List of Catholic bishops of the United States
- Lists of patriarchs, archbishops, and bishops

Catholic Church titles
Preceded by Ambrose Maréchal	Archbishop of Baltimore; January 29, 1828 – October 19, 1834	Succeeded by Samuel Eccleston
