= Provincial Councils of Baltimore =

Council of Roman Catholic bishops

The Provincial Councils of Baltimore were ten conferences of Roman Catholic priests and bishops in Baltimore, Maryland, during the first half of the 19th century. The first council convened in 1829 and the tenth council in 1869. The purpose of these councils was to set up standardized policies, rules and procedures for the growing Catholic Church in the United States. Their decrees covered topics such as the conduct of priests, the ownership of churches. the powers of bishops and the conduct of parishioners.

Although technically, the decrees issued by the provincial councils only applied to the Province of Baltimore, they were widely adopted within the new provinces being formed in the United States in the early 1800's. The first seven provincial councils served as models for the national Plenary Councils of Baltimore, which started in 1852. With the start of the plenary councils, the decrees from the last three provincial councils only applied to the Province of Baltimore.

== Background ==
In 1789, several years after the end of the American Revolution, Pope Pius VI erected the Diocese of Baltimore, the first Catholic diocese in the new United States. The pope named Reverend John Carroll, who had been in charge of missions in Colonial America, as bishop of Baltimore. At that time, the new diocese covered the entire United States. However, most of the small Catholic population in the country was concentrated in the State of Maryland. In 1791, Carroll assembled 21 priests from the diocese in a synod, or meeting, to codify a set of decrees setting rules and procedures for the diocese. These wide ranging decrees covered the conduct of priests, parishes and parishioners.

By 1808, the Catholic population of the United States had grown enough that Pope Pius VIII elevated the Diocese of Baltimore to the Archdiocese of Baltimore. He created four new dioceses in New York, Philadelphia, Boston and Bardstown in Kentucky. These dioceses became part of what was now the Province of Baltimore. In 1810, Carrol convened a second synod of priests in Baltimore. The new bishops of Philadelphia, Boston and Bardstown also attended the synod.

After the Province of Baltimore was established, Carroll made plans to convene its first provincial council. However, those plans were delay by the outbreak of the War of 1812 and then by his death in 1815.

== First Provincial Council (1829) ==
The First Provincial Council (council of the Province of Baltimore) was held in Baltimore in 1829. It was called by Archbishop James Whitfield of Baltimore and was attended by four bishops. The first goal of the council was to confirm the decrees issued by the synods of Baltimore of 1791 and 1810. The second goal was to address issues that had arisen since 1810.

=== Decrees from 1791 ===
These are some of the decrees published after the synod

- (No. 3) If a person converts to Catholicism, but previously underwent a valid baptism, they do not need to be rebaptized.
- (No. 4) A child should not receive the sacrament of confirmation before they reach the "age of reason".
- (No. 5) The parish should divide the money offerings of its parishioners in three parts: to support the pastor, to help the poor and to support the parish.
- (No. 11) A bishop must approve the absolution of a priest..
- (No. 15) A parishioner wanting to be married by a priest must first understand the Christian Doctrine. For an enslaved person, they need to at least understand the principal truths of the Catholic Church.
- (No. 16) In mixed marriages, the non-Catholic partner must promise before witnesses to raise their children as Catholics.
- (No. 17) Parishioners are encouraged to sing and pray in the vernacular (not Latin) at evening services.
- (No. 20) A Catholic may work on a holy day if required by their employer, but they should still attend mass if possible.
- (No. 23) If a wealthy parishioner does not financially support their pastors, they are guilty of a grievous sin.
- (No. 24) A priest must consult his bishop first before refusing someone a Christian burial.

=== Decrees from 1810 ===
The most significant decrees included{

- (No. 2) Priests could not leave their positions as pastors in churches to perform missionary work without the permission of their bishops.
- (No. 3) Priests could only use the Douay-Rheims version of the bible in their services.
- (No. 5) Priests should hold baptisms in churches whenever possible.
- (No. 6) If the parents cannot find a sponsor for their child's baptism, the priest should conduct the baptism in private.
- (No. 9) Priests should warn parishioners to avoid improper theatres, dances and novels.
- (No. 10) Freemasons were banned from receiving the sacraments.

=== New decrees ===
One of the new issues at the First Provincial Council was the ownership of church property. Heated disputes had been arising between bishops and parish trustees over who actually owned churches. Several lawyers, including future US Supreme Court Chief Justice Roger B. Taney, attended one session to advise the attendees on property law. A similar problem was over who had the right to hire or fire church pastors; the bishop or the trustees? These were some of the significant new decrees:

- (No. 1) Priests must accept mission assignments from their bishops.
- (No. 5) Due to past abuses by parish lay trustees, all new church buildings should be legally consigned to the bishop of the diocese.
- (No. 6) Lay trustees cannot appoint or fire a pastor. Only the bishop has that power.
- (No. 10) A priest may baptize the Infant child of non-Catholic parents if they promise to give the child a Catholic education. The sponsor for such a baptism must be Catholic.
- (No. 20) The priest must use Latin when administering the sacraments or conducting a burial service.
- (No. 31) A ceremonial written in English is to be drawn up.
- (No. 34) Bishops need to open more Catholic schools.

In addition to their decrees, the First Provincial Council sent three requests to Pope Pius VIII:

- Permission to baptize adults using the same ceremony as for infants
- Adoption of method for consecrating baptismal water that the Vatican previously approved for missionaries in Peru
- Extending the time allowed for parishioners to fulfill the paschal precept from the first Sunday of Lent to Trinity Sunday, the first Sunday after Pentecost.

== Second Provincial Council (1833) ==
The Second Provincial Council, held in 1833, was also called by Whitfield. It was attended by nine bishops.

This council settled the boundaries for all the American dioceses. In 1821, a serious dispute had arisen between Bishop Ambrose Maréchal of Baltimore and the new bishop of Richmond, Patrick Kelly, over the border between their dioceses. The Council also established the mission roles of the Society of Jesus (Jesuits). It also addressed the need for more priests by urging bishops to establish their own seminaries instead of recruiting priests from Europe.

The main decrees were:

- (No. 3) Setting the geographic boundaries of dioceses in the United States. Pope Gregory XVI confirmed these borders in a papal bull entitled Benedictus Deus, issued in 1834.
- (No. 4) Creating a method for priests to select candidates for bishop (for appointment by the pope)
- (No. 5) Recommending that the Jesuits operate the missions to Native Americans in the western territories, outside of established dioceses
- (No. 6) Recommending the Jesuits run missions for formerly enslaved peoples who had been repatriated to Liberia
- (No. 8) Urging bishops to establish seminaries

== Third Provincial Council (1837) ==
The Third Provincial Council was called by Archbishop Samuel Eccleston in 1837; it included eight bishops. Its decrees included:

- (No. 4) Bishops were responsible for using civil law to secure diocesan property.
- (No. 6) Bishops and priests could not sue each other, or sue dioceses, in civil courts.
- (No. 7) Priests were prohibited from soliciting money outside their own parishes.
- (No. 8) Pastors were warned against permitting unsuitable music during worship ceremonies.
- (No. 9) The two days following Easter and Pentecost were no longer days of obligation.
- (No. 10) Wednesdays in Advent no longer required fasting and abstinence.

The Third Provincial Council recommended to the Vatican the establishment of a separate diocese for the State of Tennessee. At that time, Tennessee part of the Diocese of Bardstown. Pope Gregory XVI erected the Diocese of Nashville, covering all of Tennessee.

== Fourth Provincial Council (1840) ==
The Fourth Provincial Council in 1840 was convened by Archbishop Samuel Eccleston, with twelve bishops in attendance. One of these attendees was Bishop Charles Auguste Marie Joseph, Count of Forbin-Janson from the Diocese of Nancy and Toul in France, on a missionary tour of the United States mandated by Gregory XVI.

With the rise of public schools in the United States, many bishops were becoming unhappy with the discriminatory treatment of Catholic children by Protestant-led school boards. The issue of what bibles to use in public schools would spark a nativist-incited riot against Catholics in Philadelphia in 1844.

The Council issued the following decrees:

- (No. 1) When a priest is officiating at a mixed marriage, he should not wear his vestments or perform any sacred rites.
- (No. 5) Bishops and priests should recommend that parishioners joined Temperance societies, which advocated against alcohol consumption.
- (No. 6) Pastors must ensure that Catholic children attending public school do not use the Protestant Bible or sing sectarian hymns. They must lobby school boards to stop the introduction of such practices into the public schools.
- (No. 8) The bishop must control all church property in the diocese. Priests are not allowed to own any church property in their own names.

The Fourth Provincial Council sent a letter of consolation to the bishops of Poland; at that time, the Catholic church there was experiencing systematic persecution by the occupying Russian Empire. The Council also sent a letter of thanks to the moderators of the Leopoldine Society of Vienna in the Austrian Empire. Founded in 1829 to aid the growth of Catholicism in the United States, the society had already made many grants to American parishes by 1840.

== Fifth Provincial Council (1843) ==
In 1843, the Fifth Provincial Council was attended by the archbishop and sixteen bishops. Among its enactments were: (No. 2) Laymen may not deliver orations in churches. (No. 4) It is not expedient that the Tridentine decrees concerning clandestine matrimony be extended to places where they have not been already promulgated. (No. 5) Pastors must observe the law of residence. (No. 6) Priests may not borrow money for church uses without written permission of the bishop.

== Sixth Provincial Council (1846) ==
The Sixth Provincial Council (the archbishop and twenty-two bishops attending) in 1846, decreed: (No. 1) that the Blessed Virgin Mary conceived without sin is chosen as the patron saint of the United States. (No. 2) Priests ordained titulo missionis may not enter a religious order without permission of their ordinaries. (No. 3) The canons concerning the proclaiming of the banns of matrimony are to be observed. At the request of the fathers, the Holy See sanctioned a formula to be used by the bishops in taking the oath at their consecration.

== Seventh Provincial Council (1849) ==
In 1849, two archbishops and 23 bishops held the Seventh Provincial Council. By 1849, the Catholic population had grown tremendously in different parts of the United States, but there were only two provinces, Baltimore and St. Louis. To meet this growth, the bishops wanted the pope to establish three more provinces and convene a national plenary council.

The main decrees were:

- (No. 2) The bishops asked the pope to define the teaching of the Immaculate Conception as official Catholic dogma.
- (No. 3) The election of bishops was altered.
- (No. 5) A bishop was forbidden to grant an exeat (educational sabbatical) to a priest unless the bishop in the destination diocese was willing to accept him.
- (No. 6) Priests were forbidden to assist at marriage ceremonies of couples who had already been married by a Protestant minister, or who intended to be.
- (No. 7) The bishops asked the pope to convene a national council of bishops in Baltimore in 1850. The bishops also requested that thee pope erect new provinces in New Orleans, Cincinnati and New York City, limiting the existing Provinces of Baltimore and St. Louis. Finally, the bishop asked that the pope designate Baltimore as the primatial see of the United States.

Pope Pius IX erected the Provinces of New York, New Orleans and Cincinnati in 1850. However, the bishops had to wait until 1858 for Pius IX to grant primacy to Baltimore.The pope also agreed to the convening of the First Plenary Council of Baltimore in 1852, which would include all four provinces

== Eighth Provincial Council (1855) ==
The Eighth Provincial Council in Baltimore was assembled in 1855. The archbishop and seven bishops or their representatives attended it. With the advent of the First Plenary Council in 1852, the decrees of the Eighth, Ninth and Tenth Provincial Councils now just applied to the Province of Baltimore.

This council enacted the following significant decrees:

- (No. 1) The Council acknowledged the definition of the Immaculate Conception of the Blessed Virgin Mary as dogma, as requested by the Seventh Provincial Council in 1849.
- (No. 2) Reversing a decree from the First Provincial Council in 1829. adults could no long be baptized using the procedure for infants. They had to be baptized according to the rules set in the Roman Ritual.
- (No. 4) No tax is to be demanded for dispensations from matrimonial impediments.
- (No. 6) The Council suggested that each diocese have 10 or 12 consultors, priests appointed to advise the bishop. The decree stated that bishop only needed to consult three or four consultors on any one matter. When a bishop died, all the consultors must forward their top candidate to replace him to their archbishop.
- (No. 7) Each diocese, through a synod, should determine the best plan for supporting their bishop.

The Eighth Provincial Council expressed support for a plan by Cardinal Gaetono Bedini to establish an American college in Rome. This college would serve as residence and seminary for American priests studying theology, canon law and other advanced subjects at the pontifical universities in that city. In 1895, Pius IX opened the Pontifical North American College.

to see an American College erected in Rome. To the Acts of this council is appended a decree of the Holy See, sanctioning a mode of procedure in judicial causes of clerics.

== Ninth Provincial Council (1858) ==
The Ninth Provincial Council in 1858 was attended by the archbishop and seven bishops. The main work of this synod consisted in drawing up petitions to the Holy See concerning a dispensation from abstinence on Saturdays; the conceding of certain honorary privileges to the Archbishop of Baltimore; the granting to the bishops the permission to allow the Blessed Sacrament to be kept in chapels of religious communities not subject to the law of enclosure. All of these petitions were granted by the Holy See.

That concerning the Archbishop of Baltimore granted to him, as ruler of the mother-church of the United States, an honorary pre-eminence, to consist in his taking precedence of any other archbishop in the country, without regard to promotion or consecration, and in his having the place of honour in all councils and conventions. The fathers also sent to Rome an inquiry as to the nature of the vows (solemn or simple) of religious women, especially of Visitation Nuns in the United States, an answer to which was deferred to a later time (1864).

The question was also discussed whether Archbishop Kenrick's version of the Bible should be approved for general use. It was finally decided to wait for Dr John Henry Newman's expected version, and then to determine along with the bishops of other English-speaking countries on one common version.

== Tenth Provincial Council (1869) ==
In 1869, the Tenth Provincial Council enacted decrees that were signed by the archbishop, twelve bishops and one abbot. These decrees included:

- Bishops are exhorted to establish missions and schools for the Negroes of their dioceses.
- Priests are to be appointed to aid the bishops in administering the temporal concerns of the diocese. They are also to supervise the spiritual and material affairs of religious women.

== See also ==
- Plenary Councils of Baltimore
