= Samuel K. Jennings =

American physician (1771–1854)

Samuel K. Jennings (1771–1854) was an American medical doctor and Methodist preacher. He was the first president of Asbury College.

Jennings was the son of Jacob Jennings, a medical doctor and Presbyterian preacher. Samuel Jennings attended Queens College (now Rutgers University) in New Jersey. He then was trained as a doctor by his father. In 1794 he converted to a Methodist. In 1796 he became a Methodist preacher and was later ordained by Francis Asbury.

When Asbury College was founded in 1816, Jennings was appointed its president. He remained president there until at least 1824. He was given an honorary M.D. by the University of Maryland, Baltimore. In 1824 he served as president of the Medical Society of Baltimore. In 1827 he was appointed a professor at Washington Medical College. He was a professor at that institution until 1842 while also serving from 1838 to 1845 as a professor of anatomy at the Maryland Academy of Fine Arts.

== Sources ==
- Circular of Information of the Bureau of Education, Vol. 15, issue 2, p. 248-249
