= Asbury College (Maryland) =

Former Methodist college in Baltimore, Maryland, US

Asbury College was a former Methodist college in Baltimore, Maryland, United States. It was founded in 1816, about 20 years after Cokesbury College, the only other Methodist college that had existed in the United States until that time, had burned down.

Asbury College obtained a license to operate from Maryland in 1818. The first president was Samuel K. Jennings. Jennings was a graduate of Rutgers College and had studied medicine with his father, Jacob Jennings. Besides Jennings who besides being president held the position of professor of mental and moral science there were four other professors. The college was still functioning in 1832 but closed not long after that.
