= Basilica of the National Shrine of the Assumption of the Blessed Virgin Mary =

Historic church in Maryland

Baltimore Basilica
- Basilica of the National Shrine of the Assumption of the Blessed Virgin Mary
- "America's First Cathedral" (Note: Despite the Basilica's slogan as "America's First Cathedral", the Spanish-built St. Louis R.C. Cathedral in New Orleans was an American cathedral for years before Baltimore's opened in 1821.)
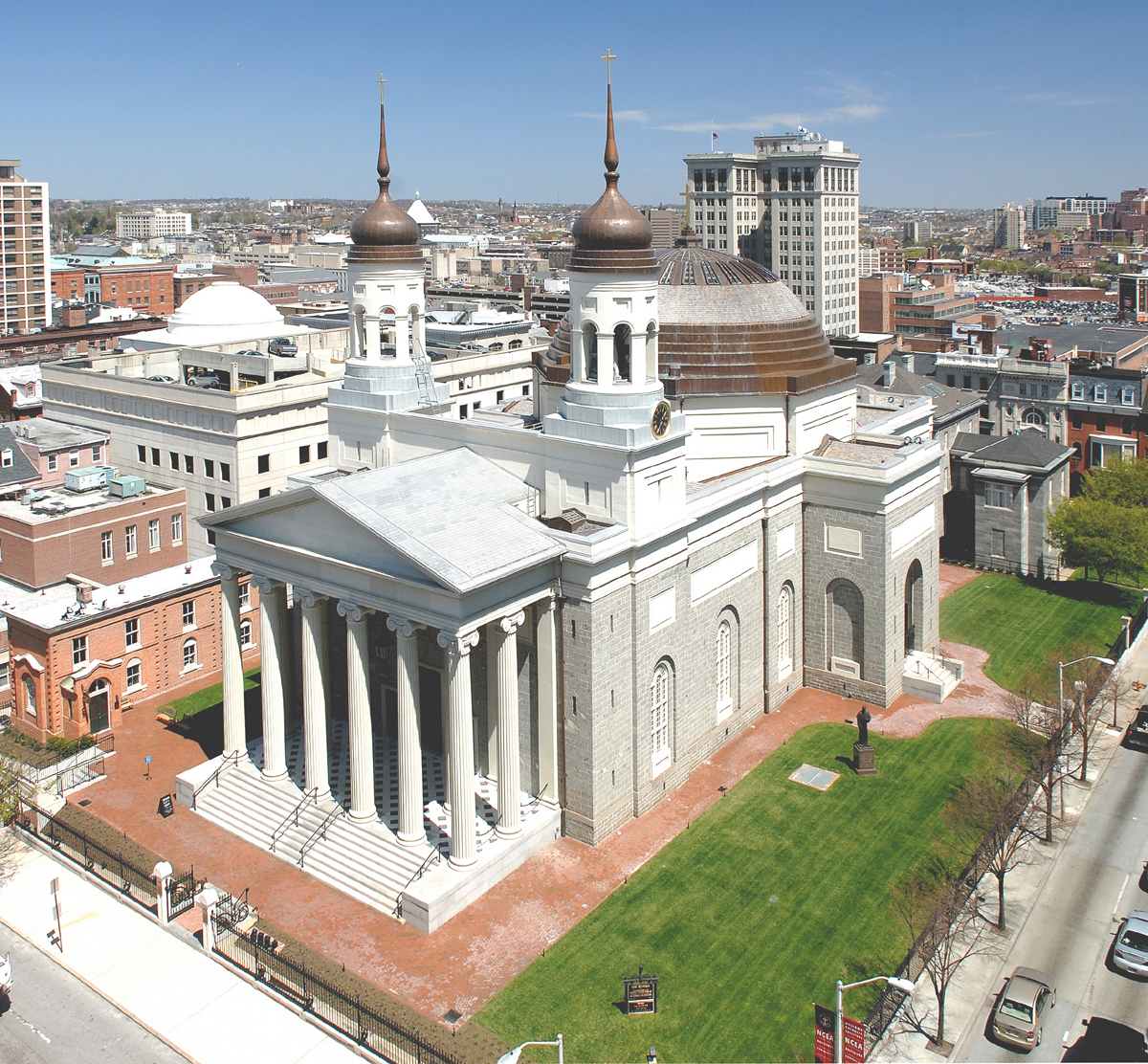
- The Basilica in 2006
- Baltimore Basilica
- Location: 409 Cathedral St. Baltimore, Maryland
- Country: United States
- Denomination: Roman Catholic Church
- Website: americasfirstcathedral.org

History
- Status: Co-cathedral, Minor basilica, National shrine, Parish church
- Dedication: Assumption of the Blessed Virgin Mary
- Consecrated: May 31, 1821

Architecture
- Functional status: Active
- Heritage designation: NRHP
- Designated: October 1, 1969
- Years built: 1806–1821; 2006 (restoration/renovation)

Administration
- Province: Baltimore
- Archdiocese: Baltimore

Clergy
- Archbishop: William E. Lori
- Rector: Rev. Brendan Fitzgerald
- Old Roman Catholic Cathedral
- U.S. National Register of Historic Places
- U.S. National Historic Landmark
- Baltimore City Landmark
- Coordinates: 39°17′39.81″N 76°36′58.18″W
- Area: less than one acre
- Architect: Benjamin H. Latrobe
- Architectural style: Neoclassical
- NRHP reference No.: 69000330

Significant dates
- Added to NRHP: October 1, 1969
- Designated NHL: November 11, 1971
- Designated BCL: 1975

The Basilica of the National Shrine of the Assumption of the Blessed Virgin Mary, also called the Baltimore Basilica, is a Catholic cathedral in Baltimore, Maryland. It was the first Catholic cathedral built in the United States after the nation's founding and was among the first major religious buildings constructed after the adoption of the United States Constitution.

It is actually a co-cathedral: it is one of the seats of the Catholic Archdiocese of Baltimore, Maryland, and a parish church (ranked minor basilica) and national shrine. It is considered the masterpiece of Benjamin Henry Latrobe, the "Father of American Architecture".

== History ==
The Basilica was constructed between 1806 and 1863 to a design of Benjamin Henry Latrobe (1764–1820), America's first professionally trained architect and Thomas Jefferson's Architect of the Capitol. It was built under the guidance of John Carroll, the first American bishop of the Roman Catholic Church. Latrobe offered Carroll two designs: one Gothic and one Neoclassical. As Neoclassicism was the unofficial style of the newly independent, Republican America, Carroll remarkably chose that design as a statement that American Catholicism belonged to the Enlightenment, not the Old World. Gothic architecture, with its medieval history, would have said the opposite. The Basilica was blessed and opened for use on May 31, 1821, by Baltimore's Archbishop Ambrose Maréchal. It was consecrated on May 25, 1876, by Archbishop James Roosevelt Bayley.

Many famous events have occurred within its walls, including the funeral Mass of Charles Carroll of Carrollton, the only Catholic signatory of the Declaration of Independence. Carroll also was the last surviving signer. Most of the first American bishops were consecrated here to fill the ever-multiplying dioceses necessitated by the young country's territorial expansion and the great growth of the American Catholic population. Until recent years, more priests were ordained at the Baltimore Basilica than in any other church in the United States.

The building hosted many of the 19th-century meetings that shaped the Catholic Church in America, including seven Provincial Councils and three Plenary Councils. These events led to the founding of The Catholic University of America. The Third Plenary Council was the largest meeting of Catholic bishops held outside Rome since the Council of Trent, and it commissioned the Baltimore Catechism.

Union General Joseph Warren Revere visited the Basilica in 1862 during the Civil War's Peninsula campaign. Reverend H. B. Coskery baptized Revere at the Basilica on October 19, 1862, and his Holy Communion took place on October 26.

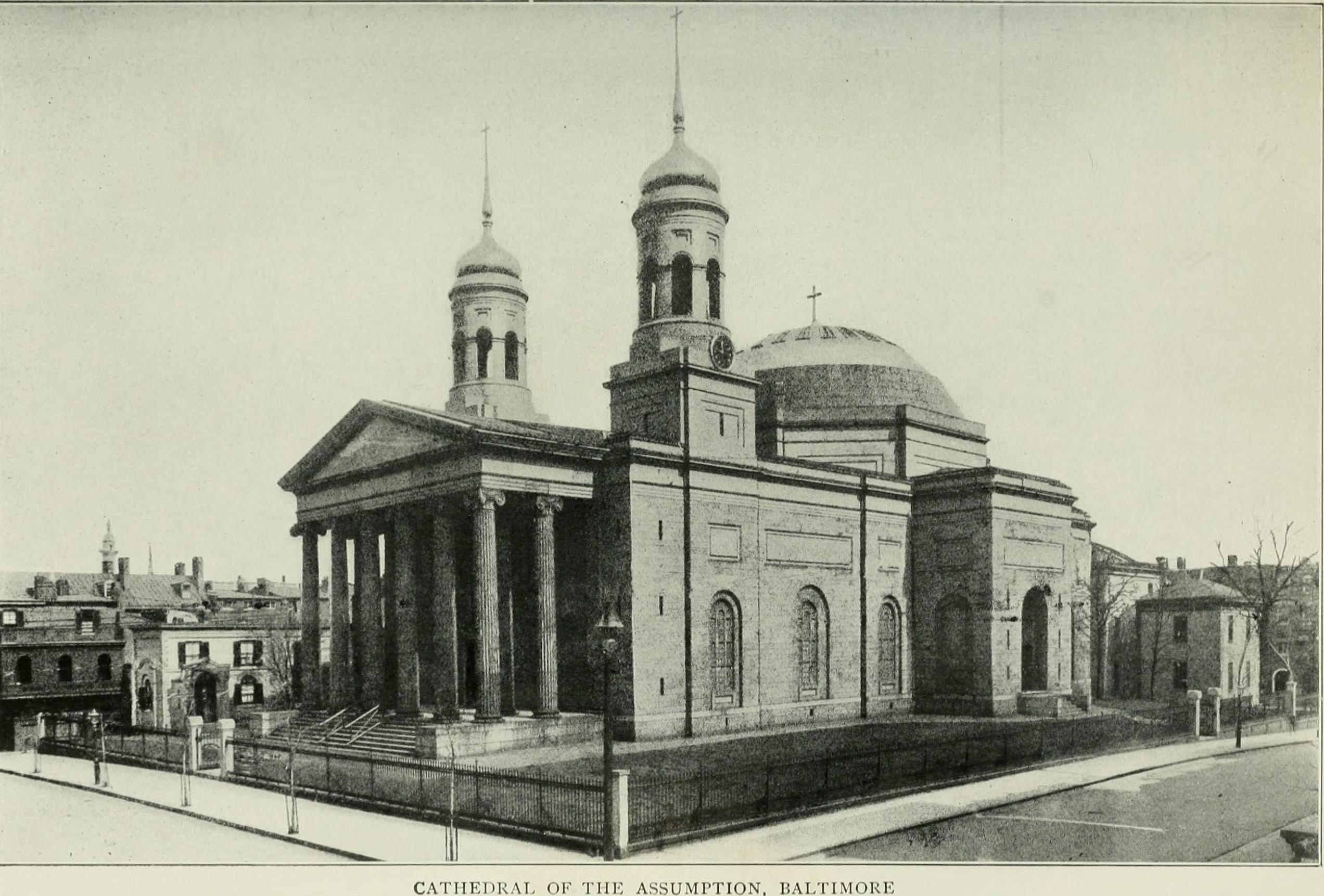
Photograph of the cathedral in the Catholic Encyclopedia (1907)

In 1937, Pope Pius XI raised the cathedral to the rank of Minor Basilica. It was listed on the National Register of Historic Places in 1969, and was declared a National Historic Landmark two years later. In 1993, the United States Conference of Catholic Bishops designated it a National Shrine.

The Cathedral Hill Historic District takes its name from the Basilica's location.

Many people deemed holy by the Catholic Church are associated with the Basilica, including Mother Mary Lange, founder of the Oblate Sisters of Providence, the first order for black Catholic nuns; Michael J. McGivney, founder of the Knights of Columbus who was ordained a priest at the Basilica in 1877 by Archbishop James Gibbons; and St. John Neumann, who is credited with founding America's Catholic school system.

== Architecture ==
The cathedral is a monumental neoclassical-style building designed in conformity to a Latin cross basilica plan — a departure on Latrobe's part from previous American church architecture, but in keeping with longstanding European traditions of cathedral design. The plan unites two distinct elements: a domed space and a longitudinal axis.

=== Exterior ===
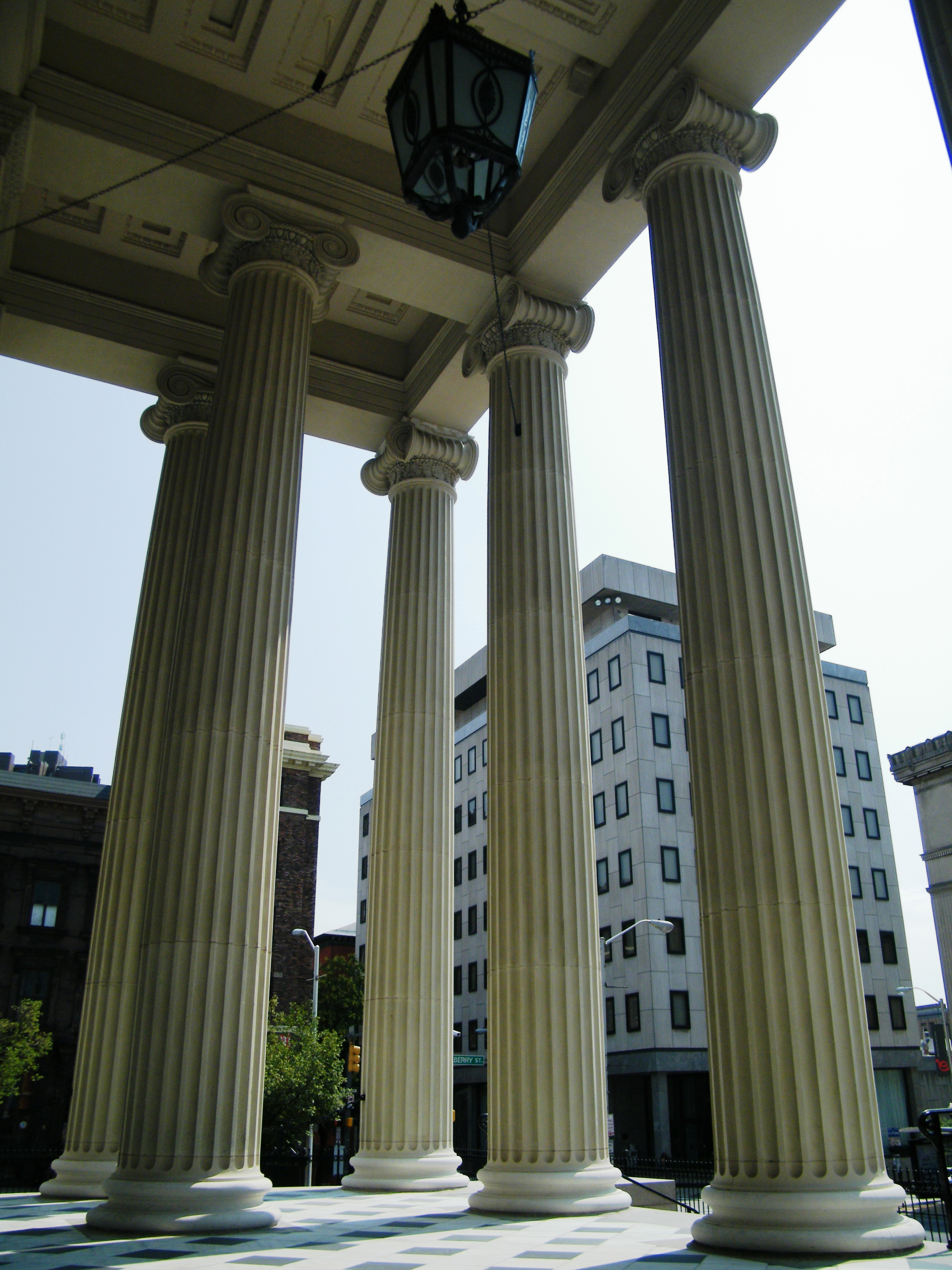
Portico with columns

The principal feature of the main façade is a classical Greek portico with Ionic columns arranged in double hexastyle pattern, immediately behind which rise a pair of cylindrical towers. Architectural historian Henry-Russell Hitchcock believed that the onion-shaped domes atop the two towers were “not of Latrobe's design,” but now it is believed that they "were entirely the architect's own." The exterior walls are constructed of silver-gray gneiss quarried from the Ellicott City Granodiorite.

=== Interior ===
The interior is occupied by a massive dome at the crossing of the Latin cross plan, creating a centralizing effect which contrasts the exterior impression of a linear or oblong building. Surrounding the main dome is a sophisticated system of barrel vaults and shallow, saucer-like secondary domes. The light-filled interior designed by Latrobe was striking in contrast to the dark, cavernous recesses of traditional Gothic cathedrals.

The Basilica houses many precious works of art, including two heroic portraits: the first entitled Descent from the Cross by Pierre-Narcisse Guérin and the second, by Baron Charles de Steuben, depicts Louis IX of France burying his plague-stricken troops before the siege of Tunis at the beginning of the Eighth Crusade in 1270. Both portraits were gifts of King Louis XVIII shortly after the 1821 opening of the Basilica.

=== Dome ===
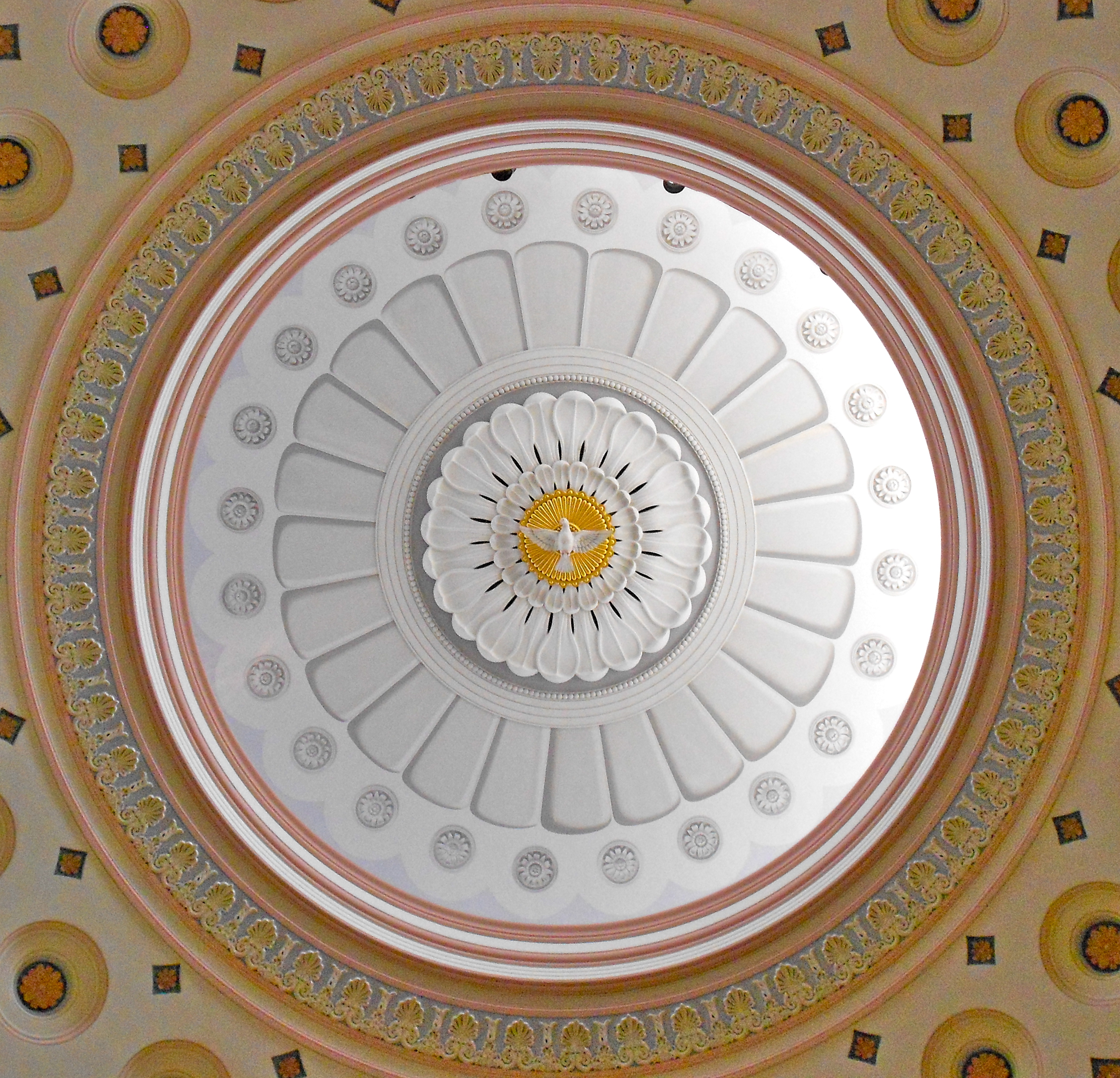
Interior of the dome

Latrobe originally planned a masonry dome with a lantern on top, but his friend Thomas Jefferson suggested a wooden double-shell dome (of a type pioneered by French master builder Philibert Delorme) with 24 half-visible skylights. For the inner dome Latrobe created a solid, classically detailed masonry hemisphere. Grids of plaster rosettes adorn its coffered ceiling.

=== 21st-century restoration ===
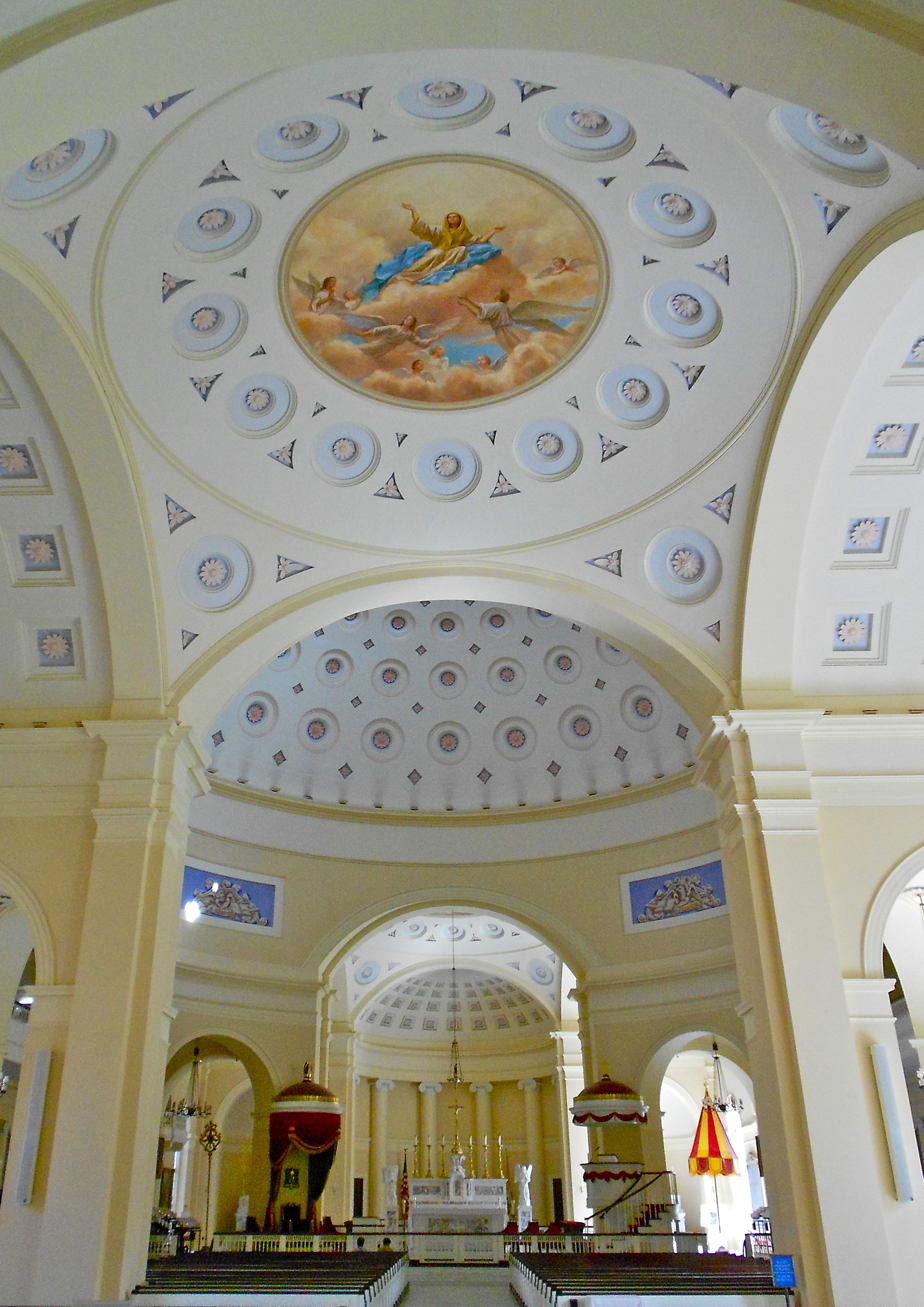
View down the nave to the altar

A 32-month, $34 million restoration project was completed in 2006. The restoration included a total incorporation of modern mechanical systems throughout the building, while also restoring the interior to Latrobe's original design. Many "misguided accretions" were corrected. The original wall colors were restored (pale yellow, blue, and rose), as was the light-colored marble flooring which had been a dark green color for decades. Twenty-four skylights in the main dome were re-opened, and the stained glass windows (installed in the 1940s) were given to St. Louis parish in Clarksville, Maryland (whose new church was designed around them) and replaced with clear glass windows.

The Basilica's crypt was also made accessible to the public, as well as the expansive masonry undercroft (basement) of the church. The undercroft had been filled with sand from the construction of the cathedral, which prevented Carroll and Latrobe's vision of a Chapel in the undercroft. The sand was removed during the restoration, and the Our Lady Seat of Wisdom Chapel was finally realized.

Baltimore's Archbiship Cardinal William Keeler was one of the many champions of the restoration project, and he completed the restoration without dipping into the coffers of the Archdiocese, instead using private funds donated for the restoration. The Basilica was closed to the public from November 2004 through November 2006, reopening in time for the Basilica's Bicentennial and the biannual meeting of the United States Conference of Catholic Bishops which was held in Baltimore to mark the occasion.

The historic pipe organ was built by Thomas Hall in 1821. It has been rebuilt by Hilborne L. Roosevelt (1884), Lewis & Hitchcock (1931), Schantz Organ Company (1989), and Andover Organ Company (2006). It was played in recital during the Organ Historical Society Convention in July 2024.

==== 2011 earthquake ====
On August 23, 2011, an earthquake jolted the East Coast from Georgia to Quebec. It rattled through the Basilica, sending nearly 1,000 feet of cracks through its ceilings and walls. A seven-month, $3 million restoration was completed on Easter Sunday 2012.

== Interments ==
Nine of the fourteen deceased Archbishops of Baltimore have been laid to rest in the Basilica's historic crypt. The crypt is located beneath the main altar, next to the Our Lady Seat of Wisdom Chapel, and is accessible to the public. Resting in the crypt are:

- John Carroll, S.J., first Bishop of the United States; Archbishop of Baltimore: November 6, 1789 — December 3, 1815
- Ambrose Maréchal, S.S., third Archbishop of Baltimore: July 4, 1817 – January 29, 1828
- James Whitfield, fourth Archbishop of Baltimore: January 29, 1828 – October 19, 1834
- Samuel Eccleston, P.S.S., fifth Archbishop of Baltimore: October 19, 1834 — April 22, 1851
- Francis Patrick Kenrick, sixth Archbishop of Baltimore: August 19, 1851 — July 8, 1863
- Martin John Spalding, seventh Archbishop of Baltimore: May 6, 1864 — February 7, 1872
- James Cardinal Gibbons, ninth Archbishop of Baltimore: October 3, 1877 — March 24, 1921
- Michael Joseph Curley, tenth Archbishop of Baltimore: August 10, 1921 — May 16, 1947 and first Archbishop of Washington: July 22, 1939 — May 16, 1947
- William Cardinal Keeler, fourteenth Archbishop of Baltimore: May 23, 1983 — July 12, 2007

== Historic designations ==
The Basilica of the Assumption was listed on the National Register of Historic Places on October 1, 1969, and was made a National Historic Landmark in November 1971. It is the centerpiece of the Cathedral Hill Historic District. The basilica is within Baltimore National Heritage Area.

== See also ==
- List of churches in the Roman Catholic Archdiocese of Baltimore
- List of Catholic cathedrals in the United States
- List of cathedrals in the United States
- Top Catholic pilgrimage destinations in the US

== Additional sources ==
- Dorsey, J. and J.D. Dilts (1997). A Guide to Baltimore Architecture. Centreville, MD: Tidewater Publishers. pp. 99–104.
