= St. Peter's Pro-Cathedral =

Coordinates: 39°17′34″N 76°36′55″W

Church of St. Peter
- Church of St. Peter
- Location: Baltimore, Maryland, United States
- Denomination: Catholic Church

History
- Status: Pro-cathedral, parish church
- Founded: 1770
- Dedication: Saint Peter

Architecture
- Functional status: Demolished
- Closed: 1841

Administration
- Diocese: Archdiocese of Baltimore

St. Peter's Church, also known as St. Peter's Pro-Cathedral, was a historic church in Baltimore, Maryland that served as the first Catholic pro-cathedral in the United States; first built in 1770, the church became the pro-cathedral of the Diocese of Baltimore when the diocese was created in 1789, and the seat of Archbishop John Carroll, the first Catholic bishop in the United States. The church was situated on the 300 block of Charles Street at Saratoga Street. The first resident pastor of the church was Fr. Charles Sewell of St. Mary's County. St. Peter's served all Catholics within the city of Baltimore who could travel to it, which was an anomaly among Catholic churches in the United States before 1884, which were largely defined by the nationality of their parishioners.

The trustees of the pro-cathedral purchased six acres of land in Baltimore in 1814 to use as a burial ground for Catholics of the city. This cemetery was opened in 1816 and, when it ran out of space in 1887, was closed. The remains were transferred to the new cathedral cemetery.

It served as the pro-cathedral of the Archdiocese of Baltimore until an official cathedral, the Basilica of the National Shrine of the Assumption of the Blessed Virgin Mary, was built in 1821 to alleviate overcrowding at St. Peter's. With an increase of the Catholic population of Baltimore from 800 in 1792 to 10,000, the pro-cathedral was only able to accommodate a tenth of its total parishioners at any given Sunday Mass. The new cathedral was built one block to the north of St. Peter's.

St. Peter's was closed in 1841, and demolished by 1845, when the Institute of the Brothers of the Christian Schools established Calvert Hall on the site.
