= Plenary Councils of Baltimore =

Roman Catholic conferences in Maryland, US

The Third Plenary Council of Baltimore (1884)

The Plenary Councils of Baltimore were three conferences of American Catholic bishops, archbishops and superiors of religious orders in the United States. The councils were held in 1852, 1866 and 1884 in Baltimore, Maryland.

These three conferences played major roles in the 19th century in the establishment of Catholic education in the United States. They also defined the roles and rules for the church hierarchy, the clergy and Catholic laypeople.

== Historical background ==
The Vatican erected the Archdiocese of Baltimore in 1789, the first and only ecclesiastical province in the United States. At that time, the Catholic population in the country was under 30,000 and the majority of them lived in Maryland. All the Catholic dioceses in the United States were then part of Province of Baltimore. From 1829 to 1849, the bishops attended seven provincial councils, all of them held in Baltimore. The bishops used the provincial councils to establish uniform procedures and policies for the province;.

From 1830 to 1850, the Catholic population in the United States, fueled by immigration, grew from 24,000 to 1.1 million, forcing the Vatican to create new ecclesiastical provinces. In 1847, the Vatican erected the Province of Saint Louis, with its own set of suffragan dioceses. Within three years, the Vatican would erect three new ecclesiastical provinces in New York, Louisville and New Orleans. By the 1840s, the explosive growth of the Catholic population led to fears and resentment among many Protestants. Many Protestant workers feared the loss of jobs and housing to newcomers and worried about increased papal power in the United States. Nativist groups arose that fomented anti-Catholic riots in Philadelphia, Pennsylvania, New York City and Louisville, Kentucky.

Facing these challenges, the bishops in the United States felt a strong need for a national meeting to unite the Catholic church. Their plan was to call a plenary conference covering all the ecclesiastical provinces in the nation. During the Seventh Provincial Council of Baltimore, the bishops passed a resolution requesting that the Vatican sanction the holding of plenary councils in the United States. The Vatican granted the petition and appointed Archbishop Francis Kenrick of Baltimore as apostolic delegate. He was given the responsibility to convene the first plenary conference in 1852 and preside over it.

== First Plenary Council (1852) ==
The First Plenary Council opened in Baltimore on May 9, 1852. It was attended by six archbishops and 35 suffragan bishops from across the United States. Bishop Joseph Alemany of the Diocese of Monterey in California and Bishop Armand de Charbonnel from the Diocese of Toronto were also in attendance. The mitered abbot of St. Mary of La Trappe near Bardstown, Kentucky, and the superiors of all the major religious orders were present.As a starter, the First Council decided that the decrees of the seven provincial councils of Baltimore should apply to the entire nation.

=== Education ===
The major goal of the First Council was the creation of Catholic schools in the United States. Teachers in many public schools were forcing Catholic students to read the Protestant bible. They were also subjecting the children to slurs and derogatory information about "popery". When Kenrick was bishop of Philadelphia, he attempted in 1842 to establish equitable treatment of Catholic students in the Philadelphia public schools. The backlash among Protestants sparked the anti-Catholic Bible riots there in 1844. To avoid these problems and provide a sound Catholic education for their children, the First Council decreed that bishops must create a Catholic school for every parish and teach Catholic doctrine to the children.

=== Trusteeism ===
Another area of concern with the First Council was trusteeism. This happened when the lay board of trustees of a parish contested the authority of its bishop. Major schisms had occurred in Norfolk, Virginia (1818) and Charleston, South Carolina, (1816) when Archbishop Ambrose Maréchal of Baltimore fought with lay trustees over the appointment of priests.Kenrick faced similar disputes with lay trustees in the 1830s in Philadelphia and Pittsburgh, Pennsylvania over the appointment of pastors and the ownership of parish property.

=== Legacy of First Council ===
The last session of the First Council was held on May 20, 1852. Pope Pius IX approved the decrees in September 1852 after asking for the inclusion of language on the celebration of certain feast days. Kenrick published the degrees after making changes requested by the pope the same month. The First Council was viewed with alarm by many American Protestants, who feared that a strong Catholic hierarchy in the United States would give the pope more power in that country.

== Second Plenary Council (1866) ==
By 1860, the Catholic population in the United States had doubled in less than ten years. The nativist reaction to the increase in the Catholic population spawned anti-Catholic riots in Washington, D.C., St. Louis, Missouri, Baltimore and other cities during the 1850s. During this period, the need for Catholic schools had become more pressing as many states had enacted compulsory education laws for children. In addition, the end of the American Civil War in 1865 had brought about enormous political and social change in the nation and the church needed to adapt its policies to meet the new needs.

The Second Plenary Council opened on October 7, 1866. It was attended by seven archbishops, 39 bishops or their procurators, and two abbots. US President Andrew Johnson was an auditor at some of the sessions. Archbishop Martin Spalding of Baltimore served as the apostolic delegate. The decrees of the Second Council are divided into fourteen titles and subdivided into chapters. The following topics are some of the topics that were covered:

=== Education ===
As with the First Council, the Second Council placed a great emphasis on Catholic education:

- Title I calls for the establishment of parochial schools in all parishes.
- Title IX recommends the use of Catholic teachers in these schools. For parents who could not afford the schools, the Second Council recommended the establishment of catechism classes in every parish to prepare children for their first communion and confirmation. Another recommendation was the establishment of industrial schools in dioceses for orphaned children and juvenile delinquents.

=== Conduct of priests ===
Title III set specific standards of conduct for priests:

- They must dress properly.
- They must avoid games and spectacles.
- They should not introduce political messages into their sermons.
- They should not act like bankers for their parishioners, holding money and paying interest on it.
- They should "...avoid idleness as a pest."

=== Secret societies ===
Title XII forbade Catholic men from joining any fraternal society that required an oath of secrecy. Pope Clement XII had specifically banned Catholics from joining any Freemasonry group in 1738 due to suspicions of the fellowship's activities. Title XII repeats this ban and adds bans on the Oddfellows and the Sons of Temperance.

=== Doctrine ===
Part of Title 1 focuses on new religious sects and philosophical movements that the Vatican considered to be heresies:

- Indifferentism, a philosophical claim that all religions were valid if they promoted positive values
- Unitarianism, a Christian denomination that believes Christ was not a divine being
- Transcendentalism, a philosophical movement that believed organized religion corrupts the purity of the individual
- Spiritism, a religious movement that believes in reincarnation of the soul. The Second Council said that such spirits are the work of Satan.

=== Legacy of Second Council ===
The decrees of the Second Council were approved by Pope Pius IX. As a result of the Second Council, hundreds of parishes across the nation started setting up their own schools. The draining of Catholic students from the public schools alarmed many school administrators, who also feared that state legislatures would start siphoning funding from their schools to the Catholic ones.

== Third Plenary Council (1884) ==
The Third Plenary Council opened in Baltimore on November 9, 1884. It was attended by 14 archbishops, 61 bishops or their representatives, six abbots, and one general of a religious congregation, along with priests and other dignitaries. Some of the activities were open to the public. Archbishop James Gibbons of Baltimore served as the apostolic delegate.The decrees of the Third Council are divided into twelve titles. The following are some of the topics covered:

=== Catholic university ===
During the 19th century, any American bishop who wanted a priest to go to a Catholic university was forced to send them to a pontifical university in Rome or to Catholic universities in Belgium or Austria-Hungary. Title V called for creating a commission to establish a Catholic university in the United States. The Vatican chartered the Catholic University of America in Washington, D.C., in 1887.

=== Ecclesiastical persons ===
Title II established policies regarding bishops, priests, nuns, and rectors in a diocese. It also established procedures in the event that a bishop died, retired or moved for the process of presenting candidates for his replacement to the Vatican.

=== Language ===
Title VIII stated that priests must instruct immigrants in their own languages.

=== Marriage ===
Title IV established two decrees on marriage for Catholics:

- Any Catholic who was married by a non-Catholic clergy was automatically excommunicated.
- A Catholic can marry a non-Catholic only if the Catholic tries to convert their spouse and promises that any children are raised as Catholic.

The last session of the Third Council was held on December 7, 1884. The decrees were approved by Pope Leo XIII.

== See also ==
- History of Catholic education in the United States
- History of Roman Catholicism in the United States
- Seton Hall University
