= Ambrose Maréchal =

French-American Catholic prelate (1764–1828)

The Most Reverend Ambrose Maréchal P.S.S.
- Archbishop of Baltimore
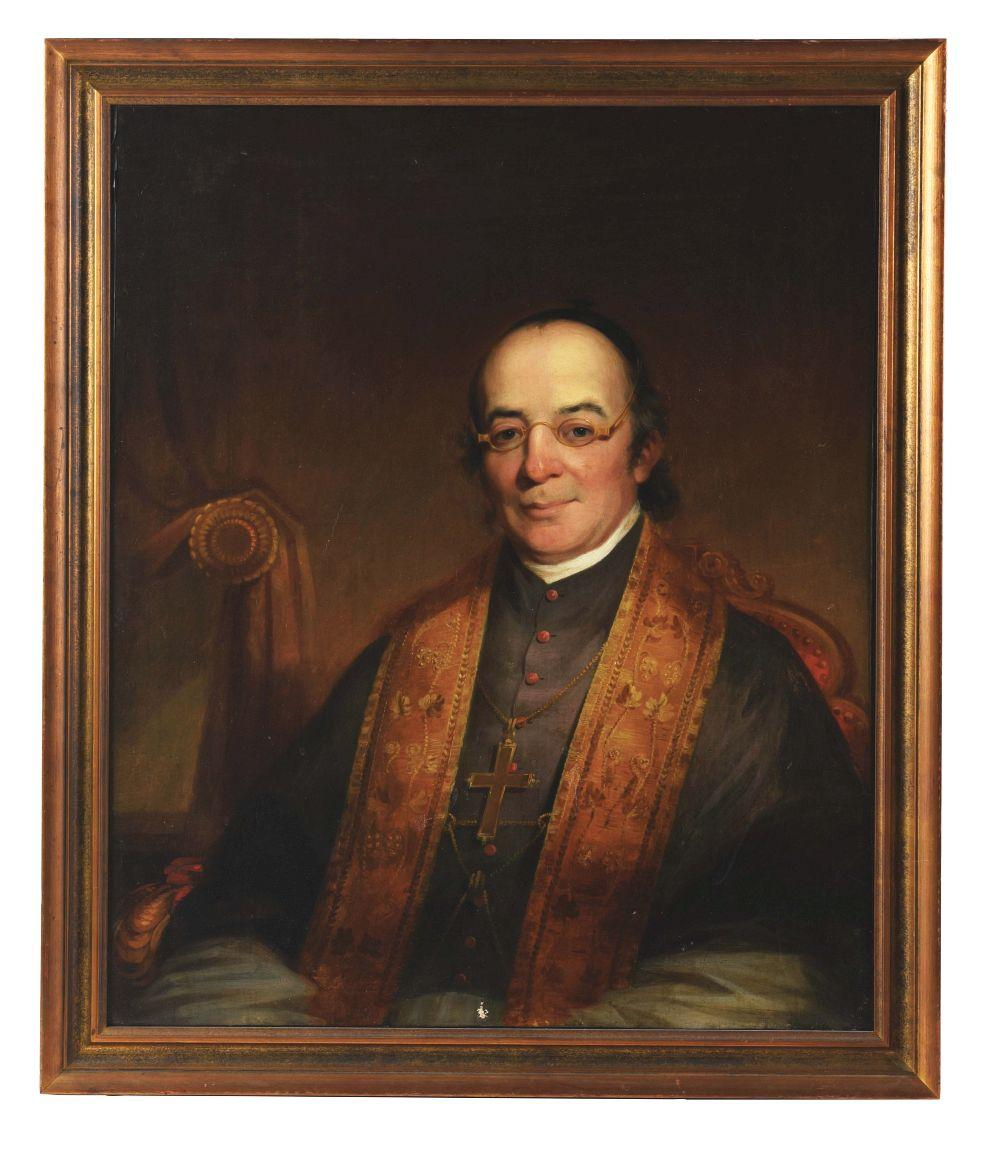
- portrait attributed to Philip Tilyard
- See: Archdiocese of Baltimore
- Appointed: July 4, 1817
- Installed: December 14, 1817
- Term ended: January 29, 1828
- Predecessor: Leonard Neale, S.J.
- Successor: James Whitfield

Orders
- Ordination: June 2, 1792
- Consecration: December 14, 1817 by Jean-Louis Lefebvre de Cheverus

Personal details
- Born: August 28, 1764 Ingré, Orléanais, Kingdom of France
- Died: January 19, 1828 (aged 63) Baltimore, Maryland; United States
- Motto: Auspice Maria (Under the protection of Mary).

Ambrose Maréchal, P.S.S. (August 28, 1764 – January 29, 1828) was a French-born Catholic prelate who served as archbishop of Baltimore from 1817 until his death. He was a member of the Sulpicians.

Maréchal dedicated the Cathedral of the Assumption of the Blessed Virgin Mary, the oldest cathedral in the United States, in Baltimore in 1821. Maréchal's tenure as archbishop was marked with conflicts with lay trustees of parishes in Virginia and South Carolina who believed they had the power to appoint their own priests. He also clashed with the new Bishops of Richmond and Charleston.

== Biography ==
=== Early life ===
Ambrose Maréchal was born at Ingré in France on August 28, 1764. Following his parents' wishes, he began studies for the legal profession. However, he later decided to enter the Saint-Sulpice Seminary at Issy-les-Moulineaux, France, with the intentions of becoming a priest. The Sulpician Order gave Maréchal his tonsure, a crown-like haircut allowing a seminarian to continue his studies, at the end of 1787.

=== Priesthood ===
Due to popular unrest in the Paris area, Maréchal left the Saint-Sulpice Seminary for Bordeaux, France, in early 1792. Eleven Sulpician priests were murdered in France during this period. Maréchal was ordained there into the priesthood on March 25, 1792, by Archbishop Jérôme-Marie Champion de Cicé.

Bishop John Carroll of the Diocese of Baltimore in 1791 had invited the Sulpicians to Baltimore, Maryland to establish St. Mary's Seminary, the first Catholic seminary in the new United States. The Sulpician Order in the spring of 1792 sent Maréchal to the United States to help staff St. Mary's. He arrived Baltimore on June 24, 1792, where he celebrated his first mass as a new priest. After spending time at the seminary, he was assigned by the Sulpicians to perform pastoral work in Bohemia, Maryland. By 1799, Maréchal was back in Baltimore, teaching theology at the seminary. In 1801, the Sulpicians sent Maréchal to teach philosophy at the new Georgetown College in Washington, D.C.

With the ascension of Napoleon Bonaparte as first consul of the new French Republic, it became safer for Catholic clergy to practice in France. In 1803, the Sulpicians ordered Maréchal to return home. He would spend the next nine years teaching at Sulpician schools in Saint-Flour, Lyon, Aix-en-Provence and Marseille. In appreciation of his service, Maréchal's students in Marseille presented him with a marble altar. Louis XVIII, who became the French monarch in 1814, later presented him with several paintings. The altar and the paintings went to the Basilica of the Assumption in Baltimore.In 1812, the Sulpicians sent Maréchal back to Baltimore, where he resumed teaching at St. Mary's Seminary. He later served as president of the seminary.

=== Archbishop of Baltimore ===
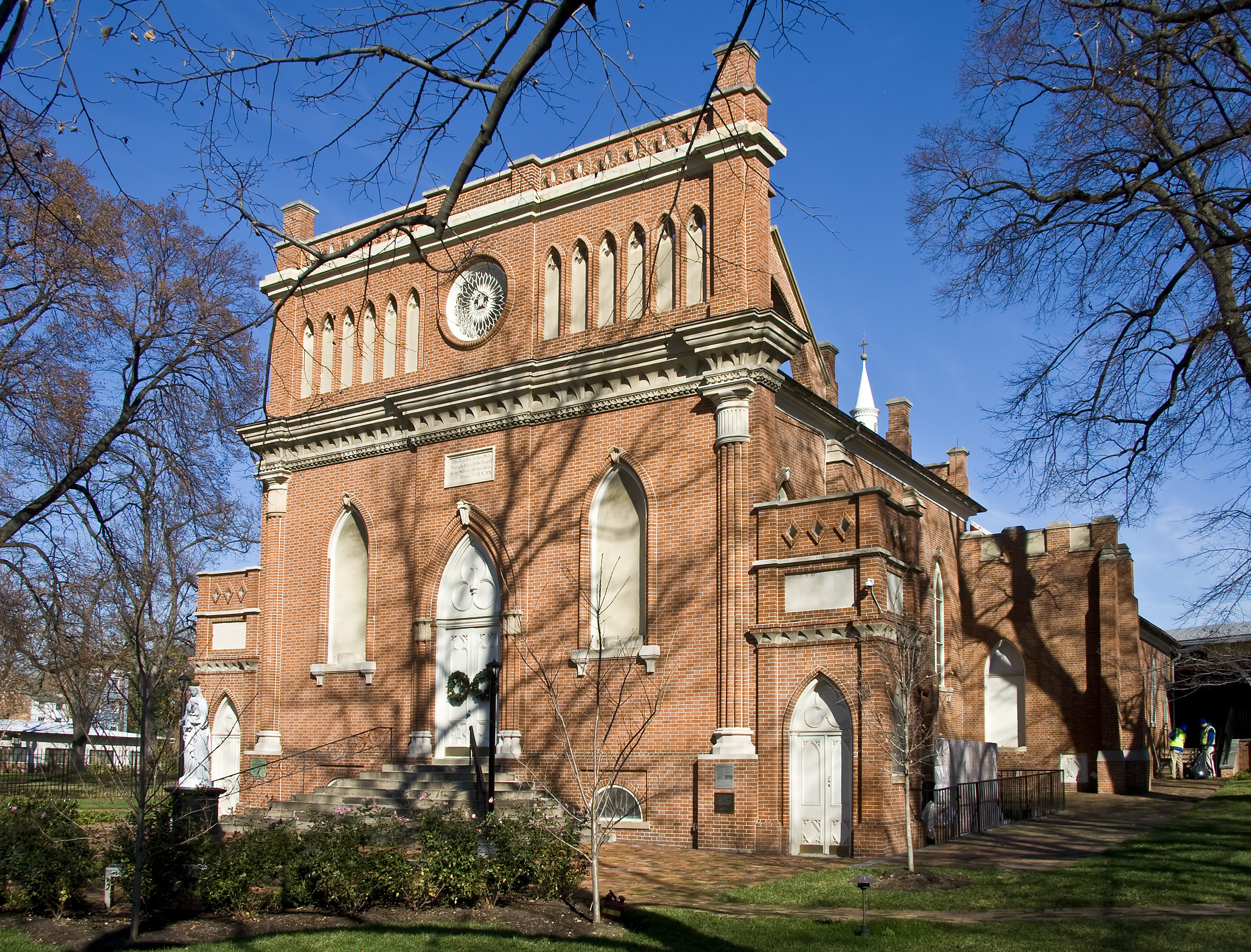
St. Mary's Seminary, Baltimore, Maryland (2011)

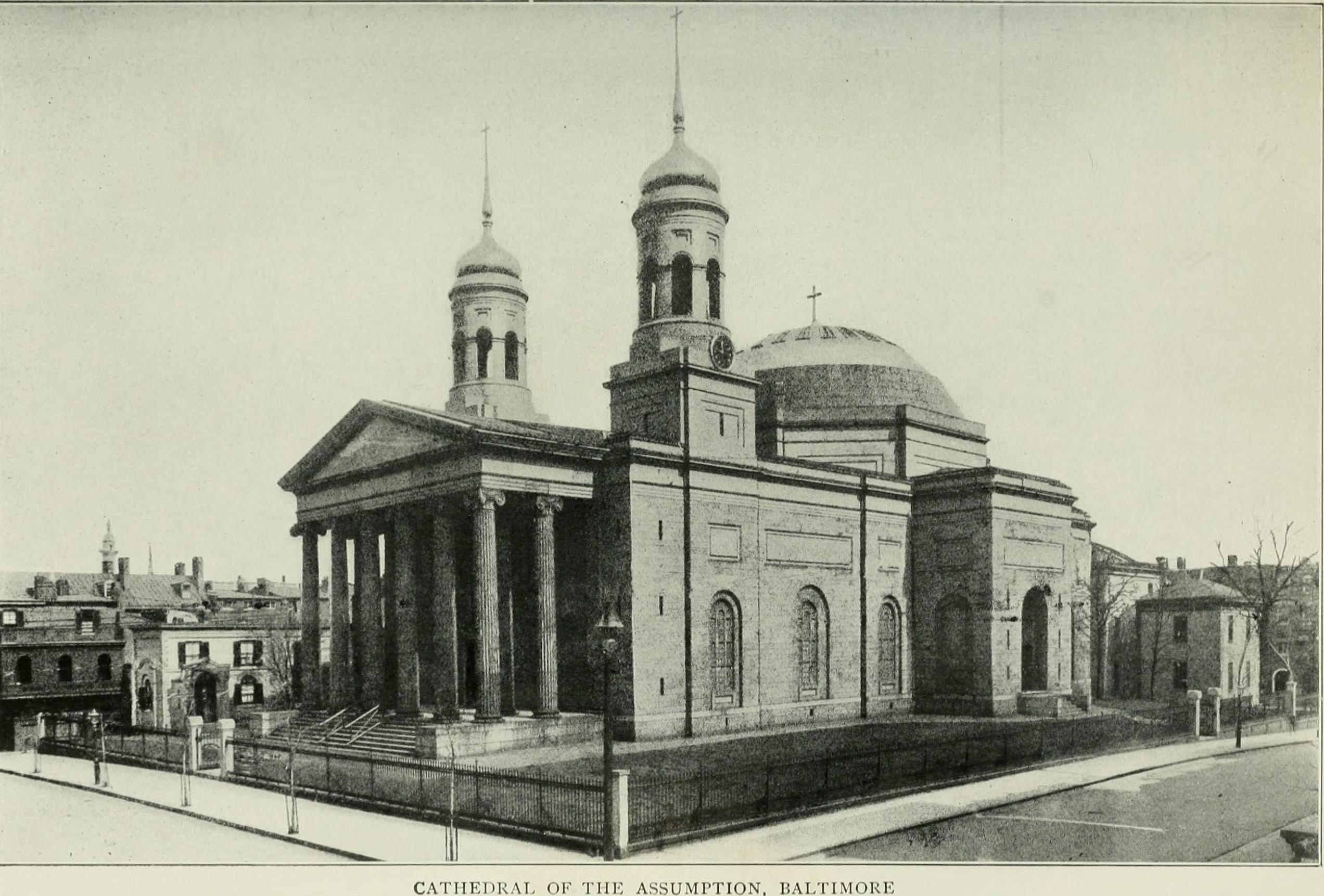
Cathedral of the Assumption, Baltimore, Maryland (1907)

On January 26, 1816, Pope Pius VII named Maréchal as bishop of Philadelphia. However, he did not want the appointment and the Vatican allowed him to decline it. On July 24, 1817, Pius VII appointed him as titular bishop of Stauropolis and coadjutor archbishop of Baltimore to assist the ailing Archbishop Leonard Neale. However, Neale died before Maréchal could be consecrated.

Instead, Maréchal was consecrated archbishop of Baltimore by Bishop Jean-Louis Cheverus at the St. Peter's Pro-Cathedral in Baltimore on December 14, 1817. The co-consecrators were Bishop John Connolly and Bishop-elect Louis de Barth.

==== Schisms ====
Maréchal indicated that the most pressing problems facing the archdiocese were the shortage of priests and overly independent lay parish trustees. The latter problem, known as trusteeism, was most pronounced in parishes with a dominant number of Irish immigrants. These trustees were willing to accept a cleric, regardless of their incompetence or lack of qualifications, as long as they were Irish. At the same time, the Propaganda Fide in Rome was receiving reports from primarily Irish parishes in Virginia and South Carolina that were unhappy with French priests who were not fluent in English or ignorant of local customs.

In 1816, Neale had to deal with a schism in Charleston, South Carolina. He had placed St. Mary's, a primarily Irish parish in that city, under interdict because its trustees had refused to accept a French priest that Neale had appointed as pastor. After several appeals to the Vatican, Pius VII upheld Neale's ruling on July 6, 1817, soon after his death. Even after receiving the pope's ruling, the trustees defied Maréchal, petitioning the Vatican to form a new diocese in the Carolinas. However, when Maréchal appointed an Irish priest to the parish, the trustees submitted to Maréchal's authority.

Maréchal in 1818 became involved with a second schism in Norfolk, Virginia, involving a French pastor, Reverend James Lucas, in an Irish parish. Complaining of Lucas' difficulty in conducting mass in English, the board of trustees had finally locked him out of St. Mary's church there. Neale then put that parish under interdict. The trustees petitioned the Vatican to lift the interdict and install an Irish priest of their choosing, Reverend Thomas Cabry. The Propaganda Fide suggested that Maréchal appoint Cabry, but Maréchal refused. Cabry then went to Norfolk and assumed the duties of pastor, despite Maréchal's threats.

In 1820, Bishop Joseph Flaget of the Diocese of Bardstown warned Maréchal about a certain priest seeking transfer to the archdiocese. The man had the appropriate letters of introduction from his bishop; however, when the archdiocesan staff observed him celebrating mass, it became clear that he was definitely not qualified. That same year, Maréchal wrote to the Propaganda Fide, complaining that European and Irish bishops were dumping their problematic Irish and European priests in the United States. Some of these priests had alcohol abuse problems, others had broken church law or had criminal records.

Concerned that the schisms in Charleston and Norfolk might spread, the Vatican on July 11, 1820, erected the dioceses of Richmond and Charleston, taking the Southeastern United States away from the Archdiocese of Baltimore. Maréchal was very unhappy with this action, complaining that the Vatican never consulted him on their creation.In May 1821, Maréchal dedicated the Cathedral of the Assumption of the Blessed Virgin Mary in Baltimore, which had been started by Archbishop John Carroll in 1806.

==== Visit to Rome ====
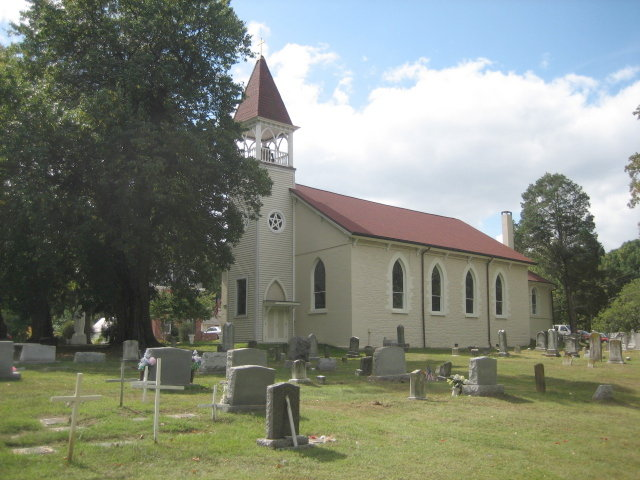
Old Sacred Heart Church, White Marsh Plantation, Bowie, Maryland (2007)

In 1821, Maréchal took his ad limina visit to Rome to visit the pope and resolve several pressing issues. One issue was the ownership of White Marsh plantation, Carroll's original home in Bowie, Maryland. Carroll had given the plantation to the Jesuit Order on February 17, 1728, but Maréchal now claimed that a significant part of the property belonged to the archdiocese. Pius VII ruled in Maréchal's favor, but the Jesuits refused to comply with his, contesting ownership of White Marsh for many more years.

A more significant outcome of Maréchal's trip to Rome was the pope's agreement to consult with the archbishop of Baltimore on the erection of new dioceses and the appointment of new bishops in the United States. The new bishop of Richmond, Patrick Kelly, stopped in Baltimore in December 1820 on his way to Richmond to meet Maréchal. Kelly wrote about the meeting:

He [Maréchal] did not receive me over kindly, and tried to persuade me it would be dangerous to take possession of my See; but his arguments did not satisfy me, and I arrived Norfolk on 19th January.

In January 1821, Kelly took up residence in Norfolk which had a larger Catholic population than Richmond. Kelly was soon involved in disputes with Maréchal over their jurisdictions. Maréchal soon came into conflict with John England, the first bishop of Charleston. England kept pressing Maréchal to call a provincial counsel to discuss church problems in the United States, but Maréchal refused. He felt that England was intruding into the affairs of the other suffragan dioceses of the archdiocese.

In 1822, at Maréchal's request, the Vatican designated St. Mary's Seminary as a pontifical university, giving it the authority to grant Doctor of Divinity degrees. After returning to Baltimore from a trip to Canada in 1826, Maréchal went to Mount Saint Mary's Seminary in Emmitsburg, Maryland on a visit. While at the seminary, he experience his first symptoms of chest dropsy (heart failure).

=== Death and legacy ===
With Maréchal gravely ill, the Vatican on January 8, 1828, appointed Reverend James Whitfield as coadjutor archbishop of Baltimore to assist him. Ambrose Maréchal died at age 63 on January 29, 1828, in Baltimore. His body is interred in the crypt of the Baltimore Basilica; his heart is in the Historical Seminary Chapel of the St. Mary's Spiritual Center & Historic Site in Baltimore, the original St Mary's Seminary campus.

== Works ==
Maréchal's writings consist almost entirely of scholarly letters and documents.

== See also ==
- Catholic Church in the United States
- Historical list of the Catholic bishops of the United States
- List of Catholic bishops of the United States
- Lists of patriarchs, archbishops, and bishops

== Notes ==
Catholic Church titles
Preceded by Leonard Neale	Archbishop of Baltimore; July 14, 1817 – January 29, 1828	Succeeded by James Whitfield
