= John Carroll (archbishop of Baltimore) =

First Catholic bishop in the US (1735–1815)

The Most Reverend John Carroll SJ
- Archbishop of Baltimore
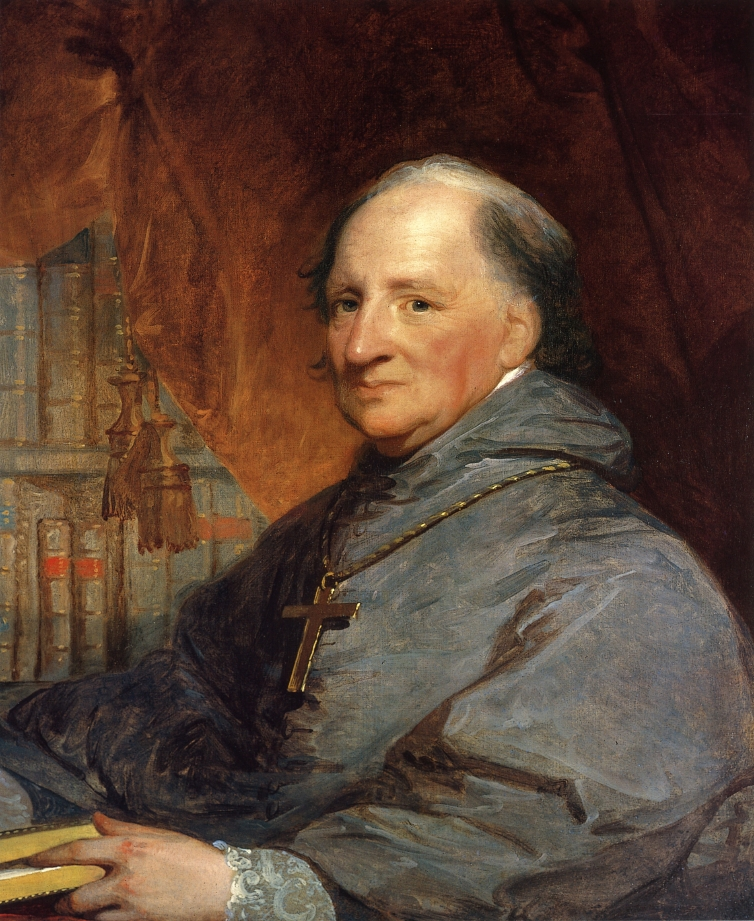
- Portrait by Gilbert Stuart, c. 1806
- Church: Catholic Church
- Province: Baltimore
- See: Baltimore
- Appointed: November 6, 1789
- Installed: December 12, 1790
- Term ended: December 3, 1815
- Predecessor: Diocese erected
- Successor: Leonard Neale

Orders
- Ordination: February 14, 1761
- Consecration: August 15, 1790 by Charles Walmesley

Personal details
- Born: January 8, 1735 Marlborough Town, Province of Maryland
- Died: December 3, 1815 (aged 80) Baltimore, Maryland, U.S.
- Education: Jesuit seminary in Liège, Belgium
- Motto: Ne derelinquas nos domine deus noster (Forsake us not, O Lord, my God, stay not far from me)

Styles of John Carroll
- Reference style: The Right Reverend
- Spoken style: Your Excellency
- Religious style: Monsignor
- Posthumous style: none

Ordination history of John Carroll
History
Episcopal consecration
- Consecrated by: Charles Walmesley
Episcopal succession
Bishops consecrated by John Carroll as principal consecrator
- Leonard Neale: December 7, 1800
- Michael Francis Egan: October 28, 1810
- Jean-Louis Lefebvre de Cheverus: November 1, 1810
- Benedict Joseph Flaget: November 4, 1810

John Carroll SJ (January 8, 1735 – December 3, 1815) was an American Catholic prelate who served as the nation's first Catholic bishop, overseeing the Diocese of Baltimore, then the only diocese in the nascent United States, from 1789 to 1815. He became Archbishop of Baltimore in 1808, up to which point Carroll had also administered the entire U.S. Catholic Church.

Born to an aristocratic family in the colonial-era Province of Maryland, Carroll spent most of his early years as a priest in Europe, teaching and serving as a chaplain. After returning to Maryland in 1773, he started organizing the Catholic Church in America with a small cadre of priests. The Vatican appointed him to several roles as leader of the American Catholic hierarchy, culminating in his appointment as archbishop.

Carroll founded Georgetown University in Washington, D.C., and St. John the Evangelist Parish in Silver Spring, Maryland, the first secular parish in the country.

== Early life and education ==
Carroll was born on January 8, 1735, in Upper Marlborough, Maryland, in the colonial-era Province of Maryland, to Daniel Carroll I and Eleanor Darnall Carroll at the noble Carroll family plantation. (Note: Some sources identify his date of birth as January 19 or January 25.) John Carroll grew up on the plantation.

- Carroll's older brother, Daniel Carroll II (1730–1796), was one of five men to sign both the Articles of Confederation (1778) and the US Constitution (1787).
- Carroll's cousin, Charles Carroll (1737–1832), was the last surviving signer of the Declaration of Independence (1776). He participated in the 1828 setting of the "first stone" in the construction of the Baltimore and Ohio Railroad.

John Carroll was home-schooled by Eleanor Carroll, then sent to a Catholic school in Bohemia Manor, Maryland. As the Province of Maryland did not allow Catholic education, the school was run secretly by the Jesuit Reverend Thomas Poulton. When Carroll reached age 13, his family sent him and his cousin Charles to the College of St. Omer in the Artois region of France. The school was a popular destination for the education of boys from wealthy Catholic families in Maryland.

== Jesuit ==
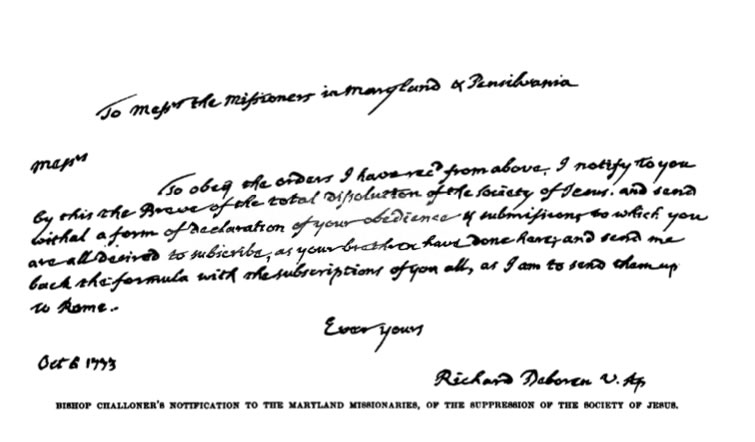
Letter of Bishop Challoner to the Maryland Jesuits informing them of the suppression of the Society of Jesus

Carroll joined the Society of Jesus as a postulant at age 18 in 1753. In 1755, he began his studies of philosophy and theology at a Jesuit seminary in Liège, Belgium.

On February 14, 1761, Carroll was ordained to the priesthood in Liège by Bishop Pierre Louis Jacquet. Carroll was formally professed as a Jesuit in 1771. Carroll remained in Europe until he was almost 40, teaching at St Omer and in Liège. He also served as chaplain to a British aristocrat traveling in Europe.

When Pope Clement XIV suppressed the Society of Jesus in 1773, Carroll returned to the family plantation in Maryland. The suppression of the Jesuits was a painful experience for Carroll; he suspected that the Congregation for the Propagation of the Faith was responsible for it. Since the laws of Maryland prohibited the establishment of a Catholic parish, Carroll worked as a missionary in both Maryland and the Province of Virginia. In 1774, he built a small chapel on the plantation called St. John the Evangelist.

In 1776, the Continental Congress asked Charles Carroll, attorney Samuel Chase and Benjamin Franklin to travel to the British Province of Canada on a diplomatic mission. Charles persuaded his cousin John to join the delegation. The goal of the mission was to persuade the French population of the province to ally themselves with the Thirteen Colonies in the American Revolution.

However, the mission to Canada was a failure; the American delegation could not win any support there. Jean-Olivier Briand, the bishop of Quebec, banned his priests from meeting with Carroll and the rest of the mission. When Franklin became sick, Carroll escorted him back from Montreal to Philadelphia. Carroll then returned to the family plantation, performing ministerial duties during the war years.

== Superior of the missions ==
During the colonial period, the Catholic clergy in the Thirteen American colonies were under the jurisdiction of the Apostolic Vicariate of the London District in England. After the American Revolution, anti-British sentiment in the new United States made it important to change that jurisdiction. When Bishop Richard Challoner, the most recent vicar-apostolic, died in 1781, his successor, Bishop James Talbot, refused to exercise jurisdiction in the United States. The Vatican had to come up with a new arrangement.

The end of the American Revolution marked the loosening of anti-Catholic sentiment and laws in the United States. Beginning on June 27, 1783, Carroll held a series of meetings at White Marsh Manor in Bowie, Maryland. These meetings started the formation of the American Catholic Church. That same year, Carroll and several supporters began fundraising for an Academy of Georgetown for educating Maryland Catholics.

Regarding the leadership of the American church, the Maryland priests felt it was too soon to have an American bishop. The papal nuncio in France, Cardinal Giuseppe Doria Pamphili, then asked Benjamin Franklin, at that point in Paris as American Minister to the French court, for advice on the matter. Franklin responded that the separation of church and state did not permit the U.S. government officially to indicate a preference. Privately, Franklin suggested that the Vatican could put a French bishop in charge of the American church, but also expressed his admiration for Carroll's abilities.

On June 9, 1784, Pope Pius VI appointed Carroll as provisional superior of the missions for the United States, with the power to celebrate the sacrament of confirmation. The Vatican reportedly appointed Carroll to please Franklin.

=== Reforms ===
==== Financial reform and lay involvement ====
Unlike in other countries, Catholicism was not regulated by government in the new United States. With little contact with the Vatican and no American hierarchy, local parishes were setting their own standards and practices. Some communities created churches administered by laity without Carroll's permission. Other parishes were controlled exclusively by their clergy.

Through his meetings with the clergy, Carroll sought to build a church structure that accepted the need for lay involvement while providing a reasonable degree of hierarchical control.

==== Early ecumenical efforts ====
Carroll frequently published articles refuting anti-Catholic slanders and misinformation. He also fought proposals to establish a Protestant denomination as a state religion. However, Carroll always treated non-Catholics with respect and said that Catholics and Protestants should work together. Carroll suggested that the chief obstacles to Christian unity were the lack of clarity by the Vatican on the boundaries of papal primacy and the use of Latin in the Catholic liturgy.

== Apostolic prefect of the United States ==
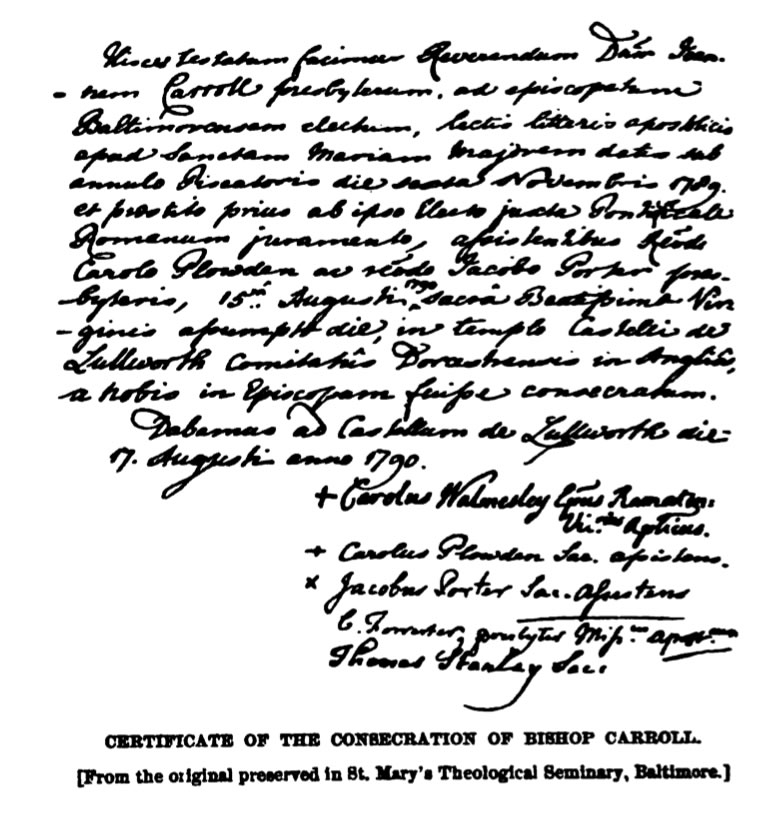
Certificate of Carroll's episcopal consecration (1790)

After the end of the American Revolution (1775–1783), on November 26, 1784, the Vatican established the Apostolic Prefecture of the United States, naming Carroll as its prefect apostolic.

In a February 1785 letter to Cardinal Leonardo Antonelli, Carroll reported on the status of the Catholic Church in Maryland, which had the largest Catholic population in the United States. He said that despite having only 19 priests in Maryland, some of the more prominent families in the state were still observant Catholics. He did mention that some of these Catholics enjoyed dancing and novel-reading. Carroll also urged the Vatican to allow American clergy a voice in appointing their first bishop, to ease their fears of Vatican control.

Pope Pius VI granted Carroll's request "that the priests in Maryland be allowed to suggest two or three names from which the Pope would choose their bishop". The pope also designated Baltimore as the first see for an American diocese, again at the priests' request. The Maryland clergy, by a vote of 24 to 1 in April 1789, recommended that the Vatican appoint Carroll as the first bishop of Baltimore.

== Bishop of Baltimore ==
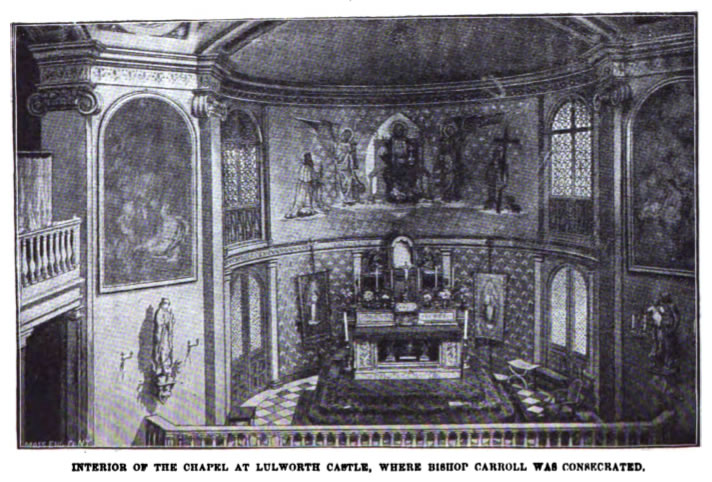
Chapel at Lulworth Castle in Dorset, England, where Reverend Carroll was consecrated bishop of Baltimore (1888)

On November 6, 1789, Pius VI appointed Carroll as bishop of Baltimore. He was consecrated in England by Bishop Charles Walmesley. He was assisted by the Reverends Charles Plowden and James Porter, on August 15, 1790, in the chapel of Lulworth Castle in Dorset. Returning to the United States, Carroll was invested as bishop at St. Thomas Manor Church in Charles County, Maryland. When it was established, the Diocese of Baltimore had jurisdiction over what is today the area of the United States east of the Mississippi River.

Carroll selected the Church of St. Peter in Baltimore to serve as his pro-cathedral. Constructed in 1770, St. Peter was the first Catholic church in Baltimore. The pro-cathedral was the site of the first synod of American priests and deacons in 1791. It also hosted the first ordination of a priest (1793) and the first consecration of a bishop (1800) in the United States.

In March 1790, Carroll sent a message of congratulations, along with a blessing, to the newly elected president, George Washington, on behalf of all American Catholics. In 1795, at Carroll's request, the Vatican appointed the Reverend Leonard Neale as a coadjutor bishop in Baltimore to assist him.

In 1804, the Vatican gave Carroll jurisdiction over the Catholic Church in the Danish West Indies. In 1805, the Louisiana Territory was added. Carroll was elected a member of the American Antiquarian Society in July 1815.

=== Founding of Georgetown University ===
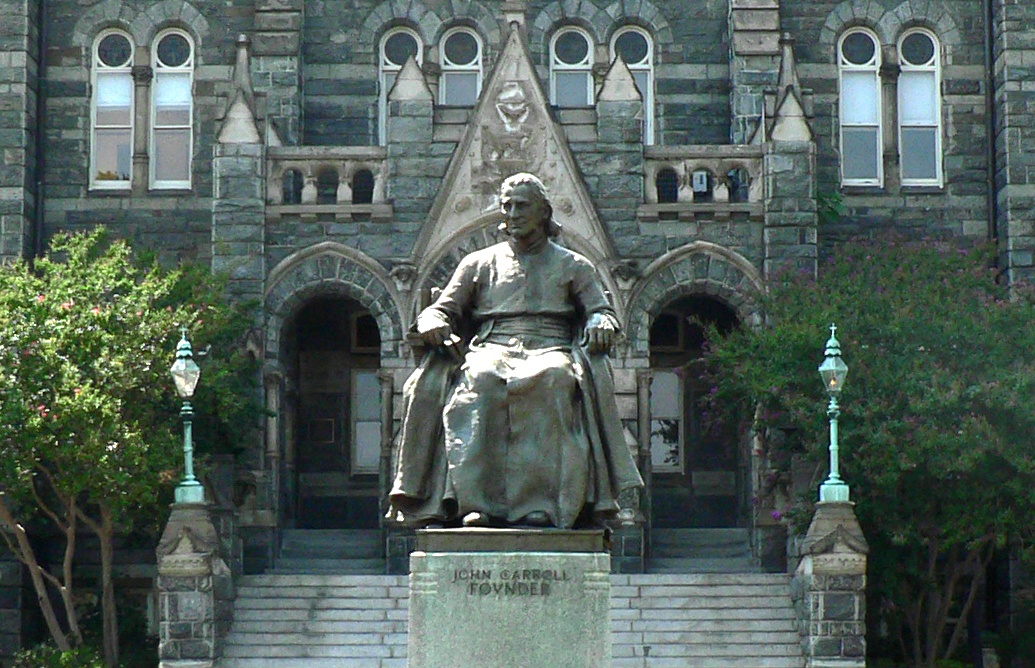
Statue of Bishop / Archbishop John Carroll at Healy Hall at Georgetown University (2007)

Since 1783, Carroll had been striving to build a Catholic institution to train American priests and educate Catholic lay people, both men and women. Construction of Georgetown College started in 1788 in the Village of Georgetown in the newly established District of Columbia. With the ending of the Jesuit suppression, the order was able to administer the new college. Georgetown College opened on November 22, 1791 The Bishop John Carroll statue is located at the university.

=== First diocesan synod ===
In 1791, Carroll convened a synod in Baltimore, the first diocesan synod in American history. It was attended by 21 priests. The agenda items included:

- Baptism sacrament
- Confirmation sacrament
- Penance
- Celebration of the liturgy in the mass and prayer services of the hours
- Anointing of the sick
- Mixed marriages between Catholics and non-Catholics
- Rules of fasting and abstinence

The synod decrees represent the first local canonical legislation in the new nation. One decree dictation that parishes divide their income into one third to support their clergy, one third to maintain their churches and the remainder to aid the poor.

=== Religious in the diocese ===
To train priests for his new diocese, Carroll asked the Fathers of the Company of Saint Sulpice to come from France to Baltimore. The Sulpicians arrived in 1791 and started the nucleus of St. Mary's College and Seminary in Baltimore. Carroll gave his approval for the establishment of the Order of the Visitation of Holy Mary in Baltimore. He was not successful, however, in inducing the Carmelites, who had come to Maryland in 1790, to take up the work of education.

In 1796, a group of Augustinian friars from Ireland arrived in Philadelphia. Carroll took the lead in restoring the Jesuit Order in Maryland in 1805, without informing Rome, by using an affiliation with the Russian Jesuits. They had been protected in the Russian Empire from suppression by Catherine the Great. That same year Carroll urged Dominican friars from England to open a priory and college in Kentucky to serve the numerous Catholics who had been migrating there from Maryland. In 1809, the Sulpicians invited Sister Elizabeth Ann Seton to come to Emmitsburg, Maryland, to found a school. Carroll had to contend with a "medley of clerical characters". One of the most notorious was Simon Felix Gallagher of Charleston, an eloquent alcoholic with a large following.

=== Construction of the first cathedral ===
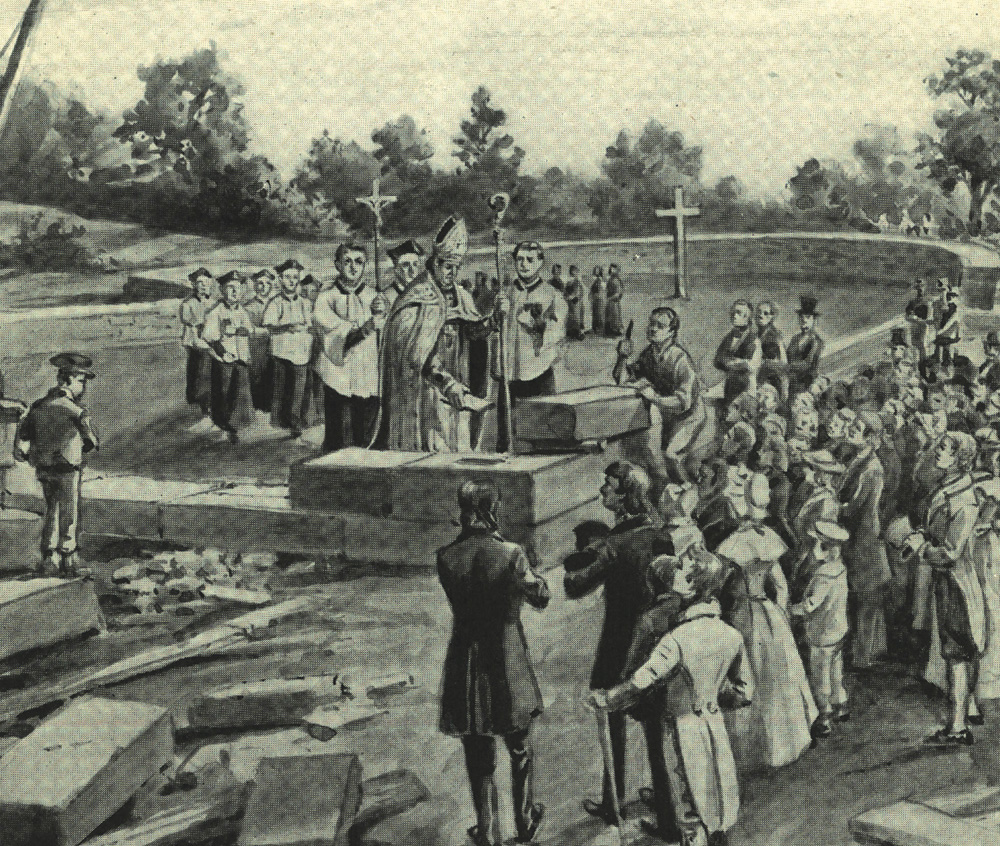
Carroll lays the cornerstone for the Cathedral of the Assumption in Baltimore

By the early 19th century, the Diocese of Baltimore had outgrown the St. Peter's Pro-Cathedral. In 1806, Carroll oversaw the construction of the first cathedral, the Cathedral of the Assumption in Baltimore.

The new cathedral was designed by architect Benjamin Latrobe, who had overseen construction of the new United States Capitol building. Carroll laid the cornerstone of the new cathedral on July 7, 1806.

=== Elevation to archbishop ===
In April 1808, Pope Pius VII elevated the Diocese of Baltimore into the Archdiocese of Baltimore, making it the first archdiocese in the United States. The pope divided the nation into four suffragan dioceses under the new archdiocese:

- The Diocese of Boston, covering New England
- The Diocese of New York, covering New York and part of New Jersey
- The Diocese of Philadelphia, covering Pennsylvania, part of New Jersey, and the coastal states in the American South
- The Diocese of Bardstown, covering the new states and territories in the American Midwest.

Pius VII named Carroll as the first archbishop of Baltimore. In 1808, he consecrated the Reverend Michael Egan as the first bishop of Philadelphia. Two years later, Carroll consecrated the Reverend Jean-Louis Lefebvre de Cheverus as the first bishop of Boston and the Reverend Benedict Flaget as the first bishop of Bardstown.

== Death ==
John Carroll died in Baltimore on December 3, 1815. His remains are interred in the crypt of the Basilica of the National Shrine of the Assumption of the Blessed Virgin Mary.

== Viewpoints ==
=== Vernacular liturgy ===
During this period, Masses were said entirely in Latin, and Catholics had limited access to Bible translations. Carroll strongly believed that Catholics should be able to read and hear the scriptures in English or whatever vernacular language they used. He insisted that priests perform liturgical readings in the vernacular. He was a tireless promoter of the Carey Bible, an edition of the English-language Douay-Rheims translation that was published in sections. He encouraged clergy and laity to purchase subscriptions to this Bible so that they could read the scriptures.

As both superior of the missions and bishop, Carroll promoted the use of vernacular languages in the liturgy, but was never able to gain the support of the Vatican. In 1787, he wrote:

Can there be anything more preposterous than an unknown tongue; and in this country either for want of books or inability to read, the great part of our congregations must be utterly ignorant of the meaning and sense of the public office of the Church. It may have been prudent, for aught I know, to impose a compliance in this matter with the insulting and reproachful demands of the first reformers; but to continue the practice of the Latin liturgy in the present state of things must be owing either to chimerical fears of innovation or to indolence and inattention in the first pastors of the national Churches in not joining to solicit or indeed ordain this necessary alteration.

It would be nearly 200 years until Carroll's wish for vernacular language-liturgy was realized in the United States as a result of the Second Vatican Council (in the Eastern Catholic Churches the use of English was permitted even a few years earlier).

=== Slavery ===
In 2018, investigations by Georgetown University and John Carroll University revealed that Carroll enslaved two men while he was bishop and archbishop: Charles and Alexis. Carroll sold Alexis in 1806 to a Baltimore man named Mr. Stenson, but Carroll kept Charles. In his will, Carroll bequeathed ownership of Charles to his nephew, the diplomat Daniel Brent, on the condition that Brent free Charles within a year of Carroll's death. Carroll also provided Charles with a small inheritance.

Carroll advocated for the humane treatment and religious education of enslaved people by their owners. However, in his early years, he never called for the abolition of slavery in the United States. In later years, he promoted a policy of voluntary gradual emancipation by slave owners. Carroll believed that this policy would prevent the breakup of families of enslaved people and allow for the care of their elderly. Responding to critics of this approach, he said:

Since the great stir raised in England about Slavery, my Brethren being anxious to suppress censure, which some are always glad to affix to the priesthood, have begun some years ago, and are gradually proceeding to emancipate the old population on their estates. To proceed at once to make it a general measure, would not be either humanity toward the Individuals, nor doing justice to the trust, under which the estates have been transmitted and received.

== Legacy ==
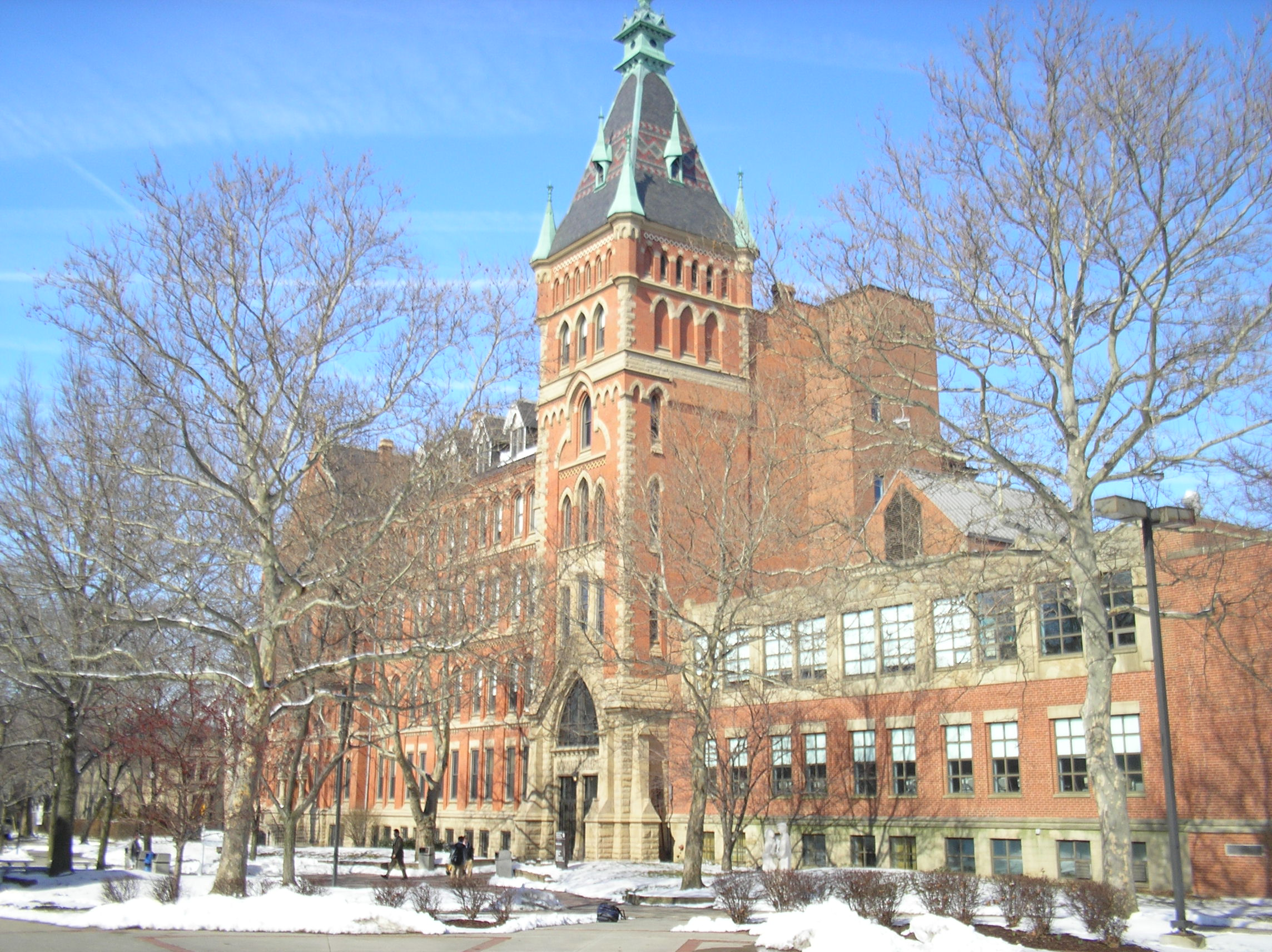
The original John Carroll University campus, now Saint Ignatius High School in Cleveland, OH.

=== Schools ===
- Archbishop Carroll High School – Dayton, Ohio
- Archbishop Carroll High School – Radnor, Pennsylvania
- Archbishop Carroll High School – Washington, D.C.
- John Carroll Catholic High School – Fort Pierce, Florida
- John Carroll Catholic High School – Birmingham, Alabama
- John Carroll School – Bel Air, Maryland
- John Carroll University – University Heights, Ohio

=== Other namings ===
- Carroll Square – an office building in Washington D.C. that is owned by the Archdiocese of Washington
- Carrolltown, Pennsylvania – founded by Reverend Peter Lemke
- John Carroll Society – an organization for Catholic professional laypersons in Washington, D.C.
- John J. Carroll Institute on Church and Social Issues (JJICSI) – an organization at Georgetown University
- Mass for John Carroll – a mass setting written by Reverend J. Michael Joncas and published in 1990

== See also ==
- Apostolic succession
- Carroll family
- Catholic Church hierarchy
- Catholic Church in the United States
- Historical list of the Catholic bishops of the United States
- List of the Catholic bishops of the United States
- Lists of patriarchs, archbishops, and bishops

== Sources and further reading ==
- Agonito, Joseph. The building of an American Catholic Church: the episcopacy of John Carroll (Routledge, 2017).
- Agonito, Joseph. "Ecumenical Stirrings: Catholic-Protestant Relations during the Episcopacy of John Carroll." Church History 45.3 (1976): 358–373.
- Archbishop John Carroll (1790–1815), Basilica of the National Shrine of the Assumption of the Blessed Virgin Mary, archived from the original on February 2, 2007
- Blanchard, Shaun. "'Was John Carroll an› Enlightened‹ Catholic?' Resituating the Archbishop of Baltimore as a 'Third Party' Prelate" In Katholische Aufklärung in Europa und Nordamerika, edited by Jürgen Overhoff and Andreas Oberdorf (2019): 165–82. online
- Breidenbach, Michael D. (2013), 'Conciliarism and American Religious Liberty, 1632–1835' (Ph.D. Dissertation, University of Cambridge)
- Curran, Robert Emmett (1993). The Bicentennial History of Georgetown University: From Academy to University, 1789–1889. Vol. 1. Washington, D.C.: Georgetown University Press. ISBN 978-0-87840-485-8. Archived from the original on March 25, 2020 – via Google Books.
- DeStefano, Michael. "John Carroll, the Amplitude Apologetic and the Baltimore Cathedral." American Catholic Studies (2011): 31–61.
- Eberhardt, Newman C. (1964), A Survey of American Church History, St. Louis: B. Herder Book Co.
- Guilday, Peter (1922). Life and Times of John Carroll, Archbishop of Baltimore (1735–1815). Vol. 1. New York: The Encyclopedia Press. OCLC 503430666 – via Internet Archive.
  - Guilday, Peter (1922). Life and Times of John Carroll, Archbishop of Baltimore (1735–1815). Vol. 2. New York: The Encyclopedia Press. OCLC 503430666 – via Internet Archive.
- Guilday, Peter. A History of the Councils of Baltimore, 1791–1884 (The Macmillan Company, 1932).
- Hennesey, James (1981), American Catholics: A History of the Roman Catholic Community in the United States, New York: Oxford University Press, ISBN 0-19-502946-1
- Hennesey, James. "An Eighteenth Century Bishop: John Carroll of Baltimore." Archivum Historiae Pontificiae (1978): 171–204. a short scholarly biography in English. online
- Melville, Annabelle M. (1955). John Carroll of Baltimore: Founder of the American Catholic Hierarchy. New York: Charles Scribner's Sons. OCLC 1100295225 – via Internet Archive.
- O'Donnell, Catherine. "John Carroll, the Catholic Church, and the Society of Jesus in Early: Republican America." in Jesuit Survival and Restoration (Brill, 2015) pp. 368–385.
- O'Donnell, Catherine. "John Carroll and the origins of an American Catholic Church, 1783–1815." William and Mary Quarterly 68.1 (2011): 101–126. online
- Shaw, Russell. Catholics in America: Religious Identity and Cultural Assimilation from John Carroll to Flannery O'Connor (Ignatius Press, 2016) online.
- Spalding, Thomas W. (1997), Most Rev. John Carroll, Archdiocese of Baltimore, archived from the original on October 20, 2009

Catholic Church titles
| New office | Prefect Apostolic of the United States; 1784–1789 | Prefecture abolished |
| New diocese | Bishop of Baltimore; 1789–1808 | Succeeded by Himself as Archbishop of Baltimore |
| Preceded by Himself as Bishop of Baltimore | Archbishop of Baltimore; 1808–1815 | Succeeded by Leonard Neale |
