= Peter Joseph Lavialle =

Catholic bishop

The Right Reverend Peter Joseph Lavialle
- Bishop of Louisville
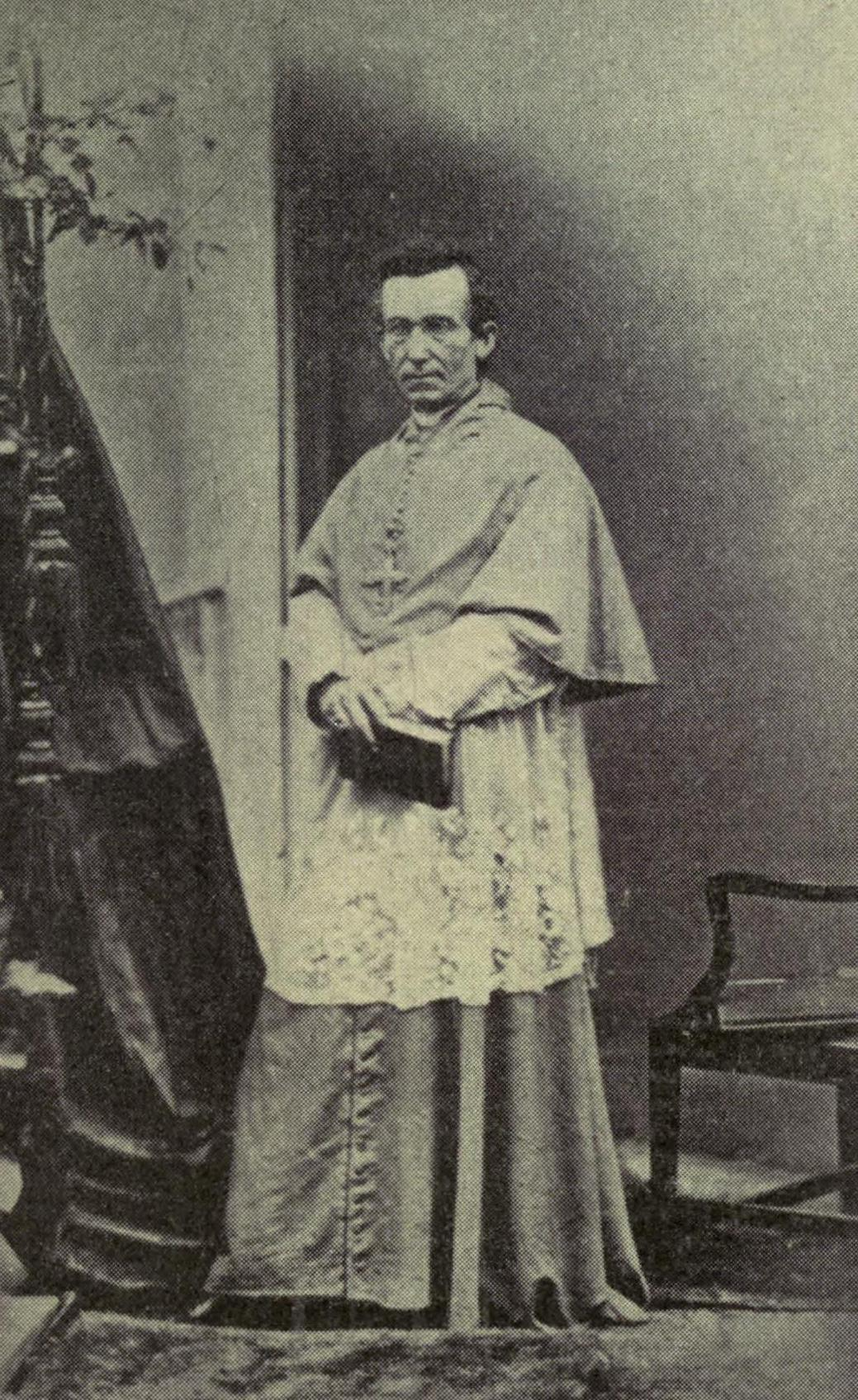
- Church: Catholic
- Diocese: Louisville
- Appointed: 7 July 1865
- Predecessor: Benedict Joseph Flaget, P.S.S.
- Successor: William George McCloskey

Orders
- Ordination: February 2, 1844 by Guy Ignatius Chabrat
- Consecration: September 24, 1865 by John Baptist Purcell

Personal details
- Born: July 15, 1819 Le Vigean, Auvergne, France
- Died: May 11, 1867 (aged 47) Nazareth, Kentucky, United States

Peter Joseph Lavialle (July 15, 1819 – May 11, 1867) was a French-born prelate of the Catholic Church. He served as Bishop of Louisville from 1865 until his death in 1867.

== Biography ==
Lavialle was born in Le Vigean, near Mauriac, Cantal, to Guillaume and Marie Jeanne (née Faure) Lavialle. He studied theology under the Sulpician Fathers. In 1842 he accepted an invitation from his relative, Bishop Guy Ignatius Chabrat, to join the Diocese of Louisville, Kentucky. Following his arrival in the United States, Lavialle continued his studies at the diocesan seminary and was ordained to the priesthood on February 2, 1844. He then served as a curate at the cathedral until 1849, when he became professor of theology at St. Thomas Seminary. In 1856 he was named president of St. Mary's College. He was appointed to succeed Antoine Blanc as Archbishop of New Orleans, Louisiana, in 1860, but he refused the honor.

On July 7, 1865, Lavialle was appointed Bishop of Louisville by Pope Pius IX. He received his episcopal consecration on the following September 24 from Archbishop John Baptist Purcell, with Bishops Jacques-Maurice De Saint Palais and John McGill serving as co-consecrators. During his short tenure, he conducted diocesan visitations, invited the Dominican Fathers and founded a convent for them, erected four churches in the city of Louisville alone. He attended the Second Plenary Council of Baltimore in October 1866.

Exhausted from his labors, Lavialle retired to St. Joseph's Infirmary and next to Nazareth, near Bardstown, where he later died at age 46. He was buried in the crypt of the Cathedral of the Assumption.

== Episcopal succession ==
Catholic Church titles
Preceded by Martin John Spalding	Bishop of Louisville; 1865–1867	Succeeded by William George McCloskey
