= William George McCloskey =

American priest (1823–1909)

William G. McCloskey
- Bishop of Louisville (1868–1909)
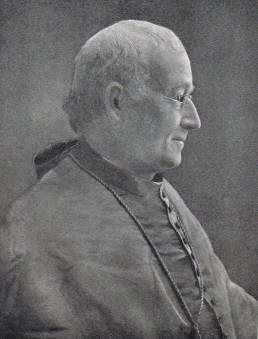
- Other posts: Rector of the American College, Rome (1860–1868)

Orders
- Ordination: October 6, 1852 by John Hughes
- Consecration: May 24, 1868 by Karl-August von Reisach

Personal details
- Born: November 10, 1823 Brooklyn, New York, U.S.
- Died: September 17, 1909 (aged 85) Louisville, Kentucky, U.S.
- Buried: Nazareth, Kentucky, U.S.

William George McCloskey (10 November 1823 – 17 September 1909) was an American Catholic prelate who served as Bishop of Louisville from 1868 to 1909.

== Life ==
=== Early life ===
William George McCloskey was born in Brooklyn, New York on November 10, 1823, the youngest of five sons of George and Ellen McCloskey. Two of his older brothers, John and George McCloskey, also became priests. John became president of Mount St. Mary's College in Emmitsburg, Maryland. George became pastor of the Church of the Nativity in New York City.

William McCloskey entered Mount St. Mary's in 1835 and graduated in 1840. In May 1850, he was ordained subdeacon there by Archbishop Samuel Eccleston.

=== Priesthood ===
On October 6, 1852, McCloskey was ordained a priest by Archbishop John Hughes for the Archdiocese of New York in St. Patrick's Cathedral in New York City. After his ordination, the archdiocese assigned McCloskey as assistant pastor at Church of the Nativity in Manhattan, serving with his brother George. William McCloskey celebrated his first mass in the basement of that church.

After ten months at Nativity, William McCloskey in 1853 requested a transfer back to Mount St. Mary out of desire to live in a cloister. Permission was granted and he became an instructor in English and Latin at the seminary. In 1857, McCloskey succeeded Reverend William Henry Elder as director of St. Mary's Seminary, where he taught moral theology and sacred scripture. During this time, Georgetown University awarded him a Doctor of Divinity degree.

On December 1, 1859 Pope Pius IX appointed McCloskey as the first rector of the American College at Rome, a seminary for American priests studying in that city. He was the unanimous choice of the bishops in the United States. McCloskey reached Rome in March 1860. While McCloskey was rector, the American Civil War (1860 to 1865) was raging at home. He had to deal with deep tension in the student body between those favoring the Confederacy and others supporting the US Government.

=== Bishop of Louisville ===
On May 3 1868, Pius IX appointed McCloskey as bishop of Louisville. He was consecrated at the Santa Maria del Umilta Church in Rome on May 24. 1868, by Cardinal Karl-August von Reisach, with Archbishops Xavier de Mérode and Salvatore Nobili Vitelleschi serving as co-consecrators.

He arrived in Louisville, as its bishop, towards the end of summer 1868. He found sixty-four churches and left in his diocese at his death one hundred and sixty-five. He introduced many religious orders into the diocese: the Passionists, the Benedictines, the Fathers of the Resurrection, the Little Sisters of the Poor, the Franciscan Sisters, and the Brothers of Mary.

In 1869, his older brother, George McCloskey, resigned as pastor of the Church of the Nativity in Manhattan, a position he had held for over twenty-years, to go to Louisville and serve as vicar general for his brother. In that same year, Bishop McCloskey was instrumental in bringing the Sisters of Mercy to Louisville in October 1869, where they took over operation of the U.S. Marine Hospital in that city.

The growth of the parochial schools was chiefly the product of his zeal. In 1869 he established the diocesan seminary known as Preston Park Seminary. He wrote a life of Mary Magdalen (Louisville, 1900).

McCloskey was present at the First Vatican Council in Rome in 1870. He also attended the Second Plenary Council of Baltimore in 1866, and the Third Plenary Council of Baltimore, in 1884, strongly advocating in the former the cause of the American College at Rome.

== Death ==
McCloskey died on September 17, 1909, at Preston Park Seminary at Bellarmine College in Louisville. He was buried in a cemetery in Nazareth, Kentucky.

== Sources ==
- The Record, the diocesan organ of Louisville, files;
- Brann, History of the American College at Rome (New York, 1910)

== Episcopal succession ==
Catholic Church titles
Preceded by —	Rector of the American College, Rome; 1860–1868	Succeeded by Silas Chatard
Preceded by Peter Joseph Lavialle	Bishop of Louisville; 1868–1909	Succeeded by Denis O'Donaghue
