= Reliquaries of Saint Thomas Becket =

Many Reliquaries of Saint Thomas Becket were produced by the Limoges enamellists in the 1200s to house relics of Thomas Becket.

== Reliquaries in public collections ==
France

- Musée d'art Roger-Quilliot in Clermont-Ferrand;
- Musée de la Sénatorerie in Guéret;
- Musée de l'Évêché in Limoges;
- Musée des Beaux-Arts in Lyon;
- Musée du Louvre in Paris (2 reliquaries - Murder and Burial of Saint Thomas Becket and Martyrdom and Glorification of Saint Thomas Becket;
- Musée national du Moyen Âge in Paris (2 reliquaries);
- Sens Cathedral;
- Église Saint-Laurent in Le Vigean;

Germany

- Schnütgen Museum in Cologne;
- Museum für Kunst und Gewerbe in Hamburg;

Italy

- Anagni Cathedral;
- Museum of Lucca Cathedral;

the Netherlands

- Museum Catharijneconvent, Utrecht;

Sweden

- Church in Trönö, Hälsingland

United Kingdom

- Ashmolean Museum in Oxford;
- Hereford Cathedral;
- British Museum in London (2 reliquaries);
- Becket Casket in the Victoria and Albert Museum in London;
- Burrell Collection in Glasgow;

USA

- Glencairn Museum in Bryn Athyn (Pennsylvania);
- Cleveland Museum of Art in Cleveland (plaque);
- Allen Memorial Art Museum in Oberlin
- California Palace of the Legion of Honor in San Francisco;
- Toledo Art Museum in Toledo;

== Gallery ==
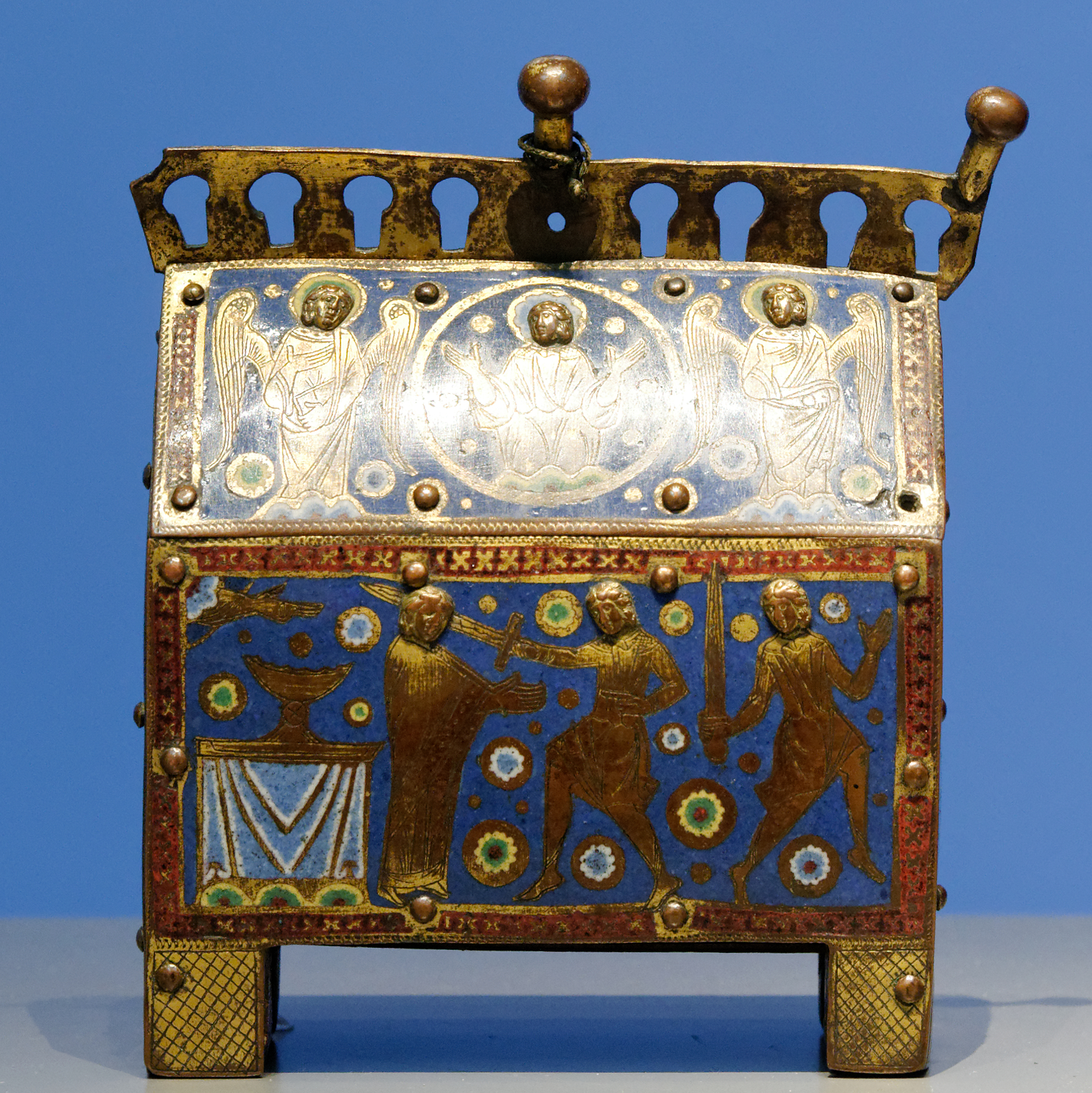
British Museum

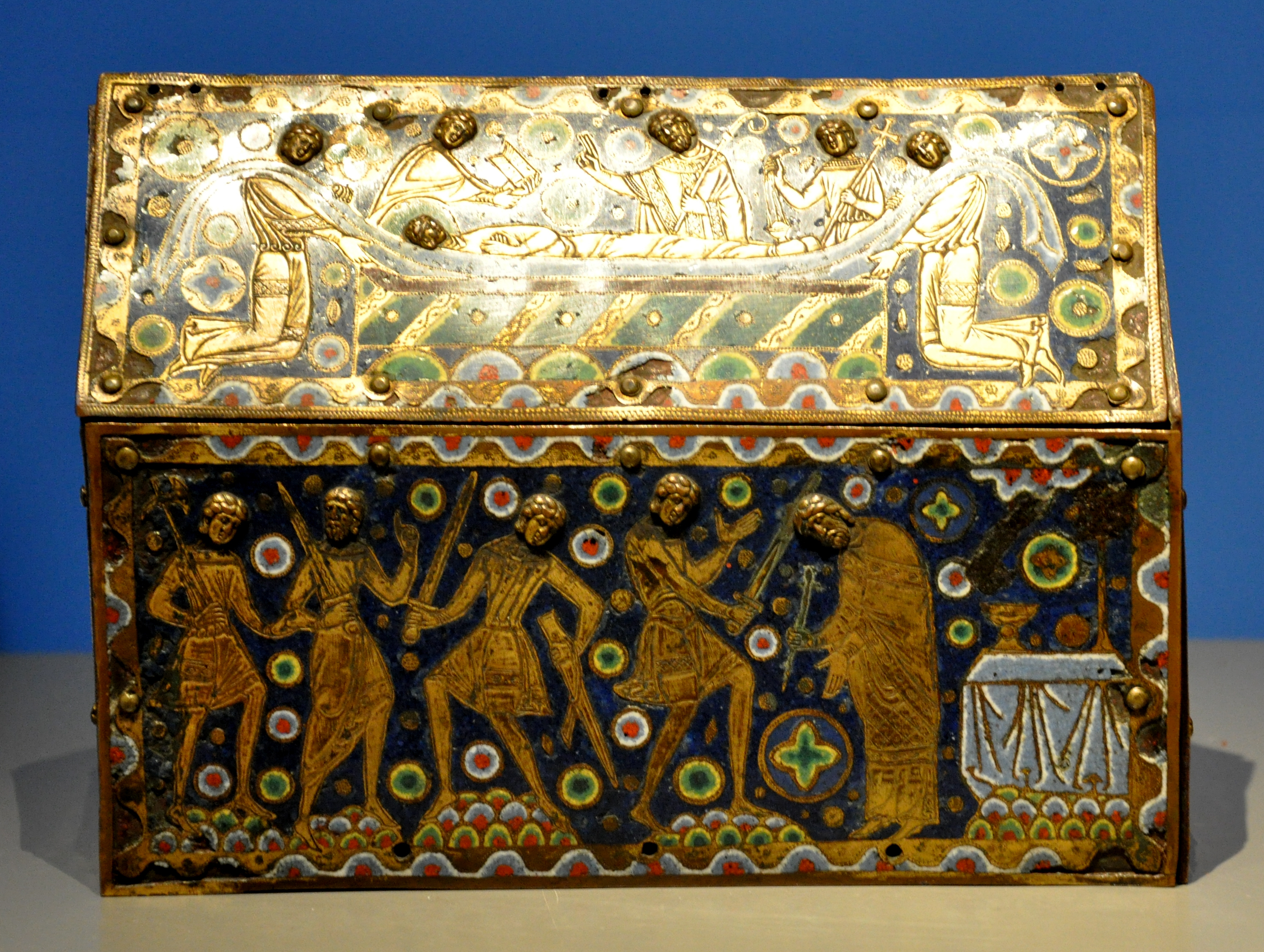
British Museum

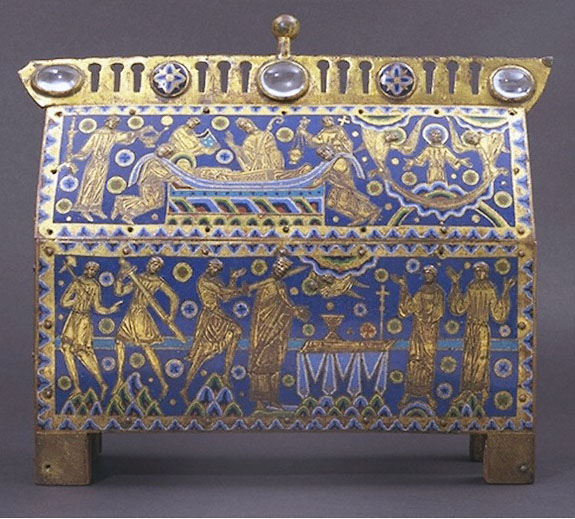
Victoria and Albert Museum

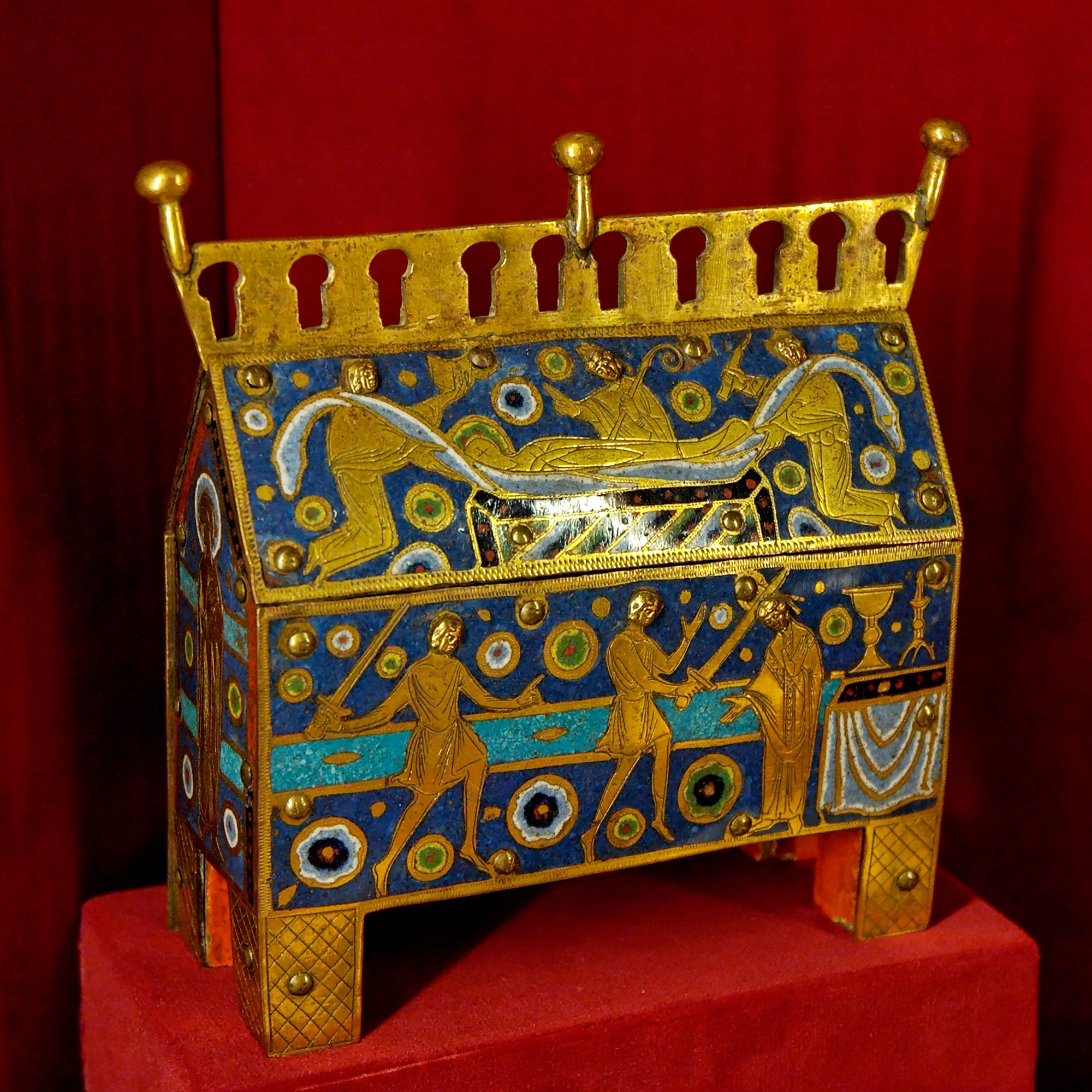
Musée national du Moyen Âge, Paris

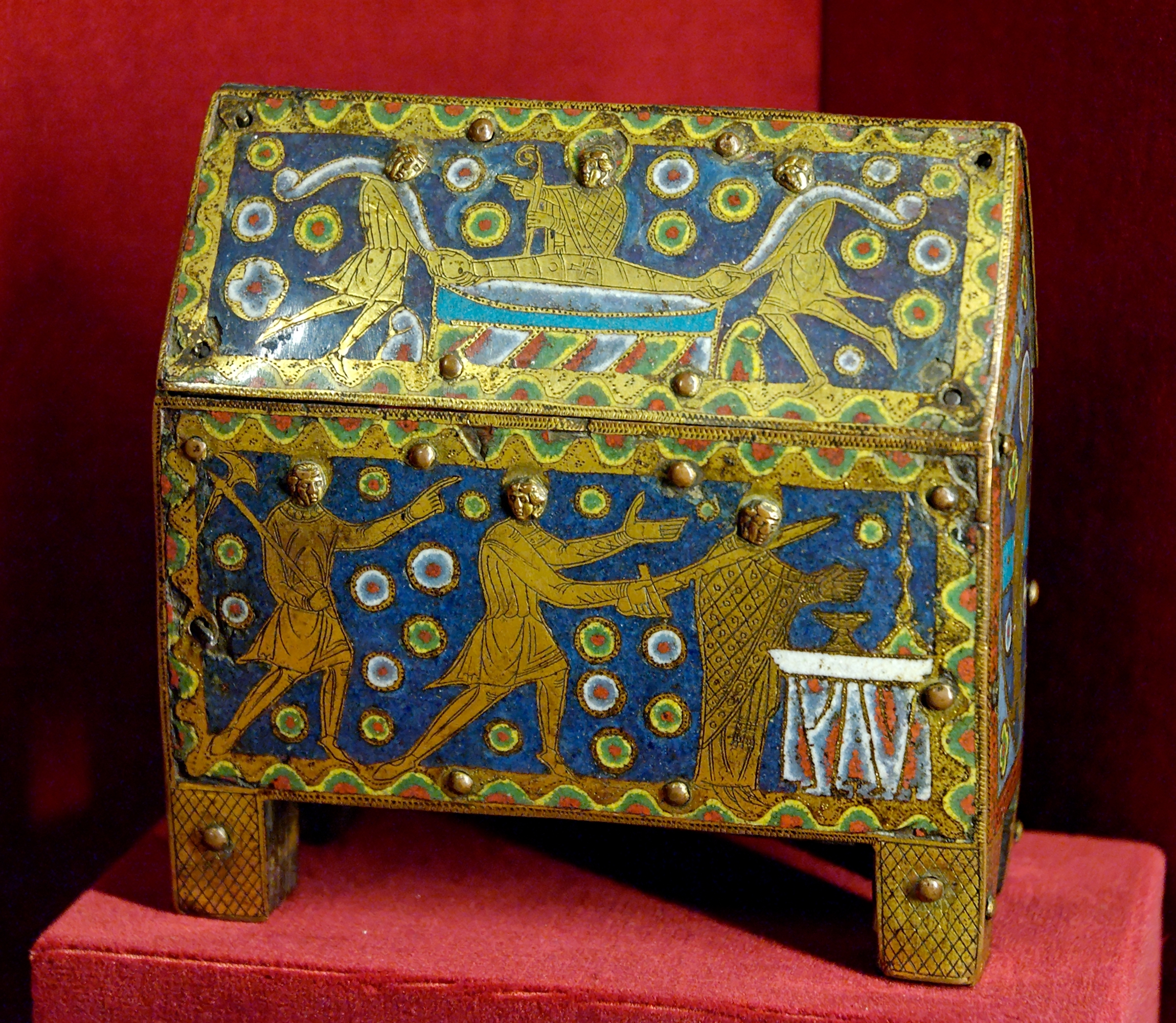
Musée national du Moyen Âge, Paris

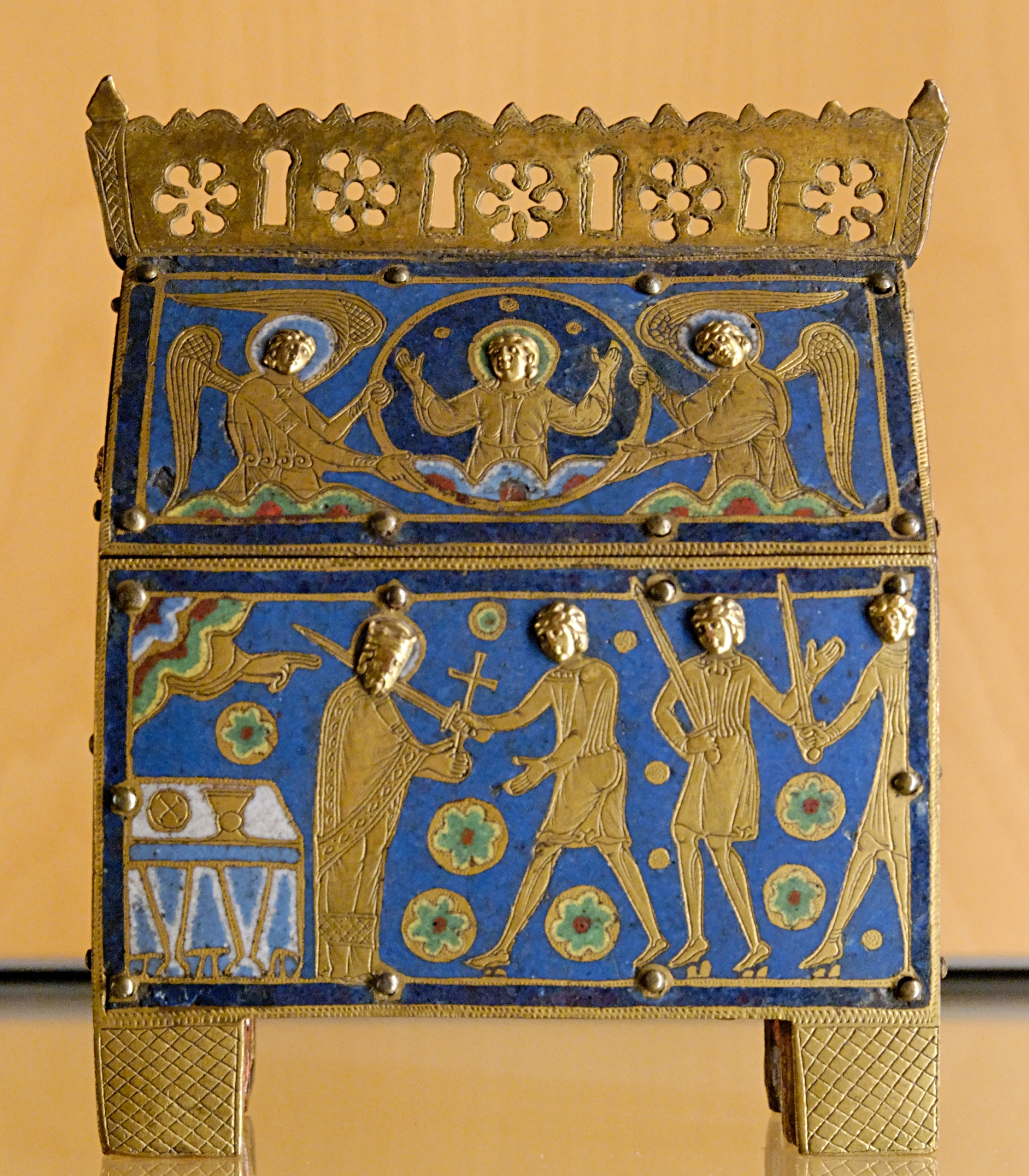
Musée des Beaux-Arts, Lyon

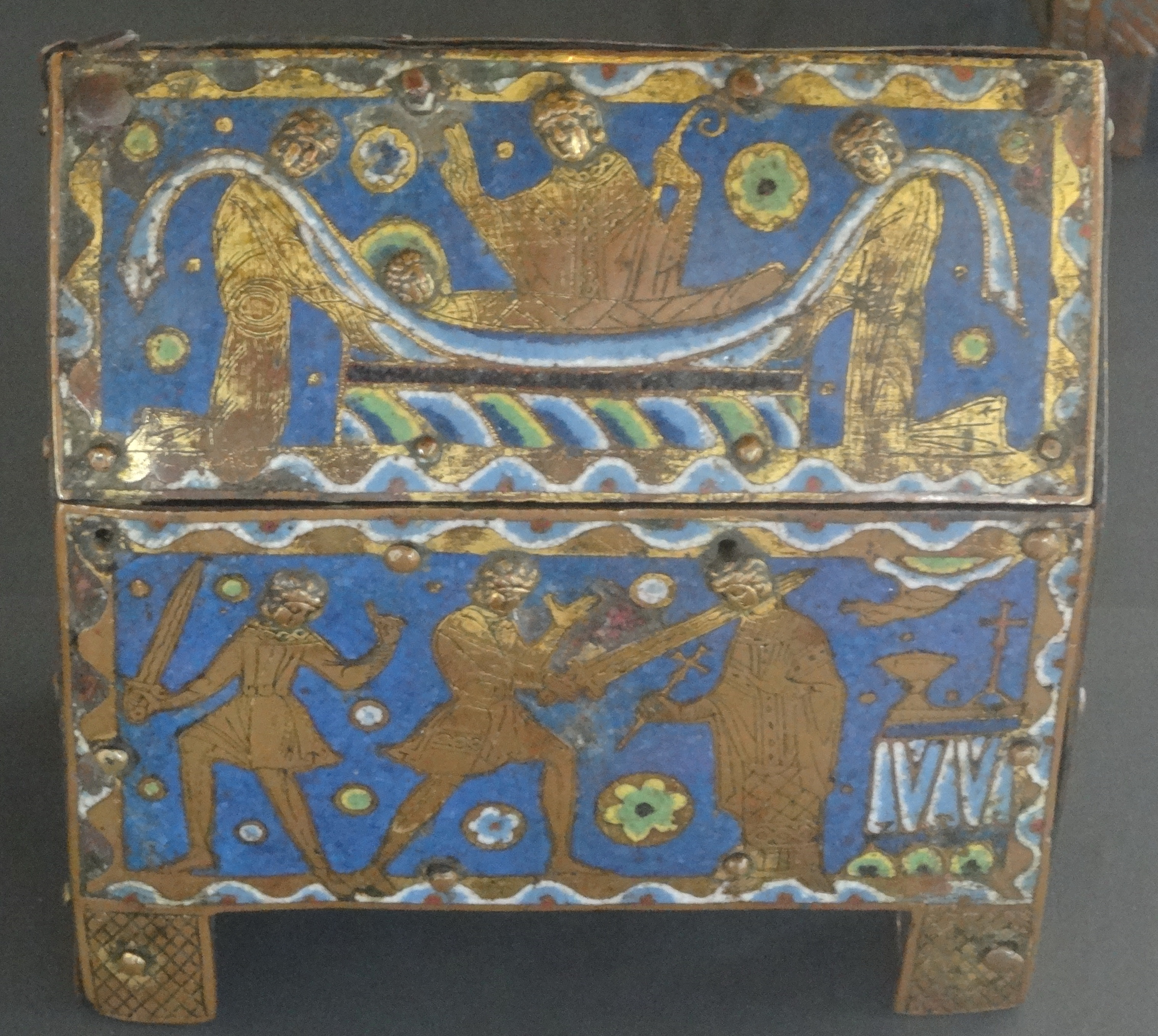
Musée des Beaux-Arts in Limoges

== Sources ==
- Foreville, Raymonde (October–December 1976). "La diffusion du culte de Thomas Becket dans la France de l'Ouest avant la fin du XIIe siècle". Cahiers de civilisation médiévale (in French) (76): 347–369.
