= Guy Ignatius Chabrat =

The Right Reverend Guy Ignatius Chabrat P.S.S.
- Bishop of Bardstown, Kentucky
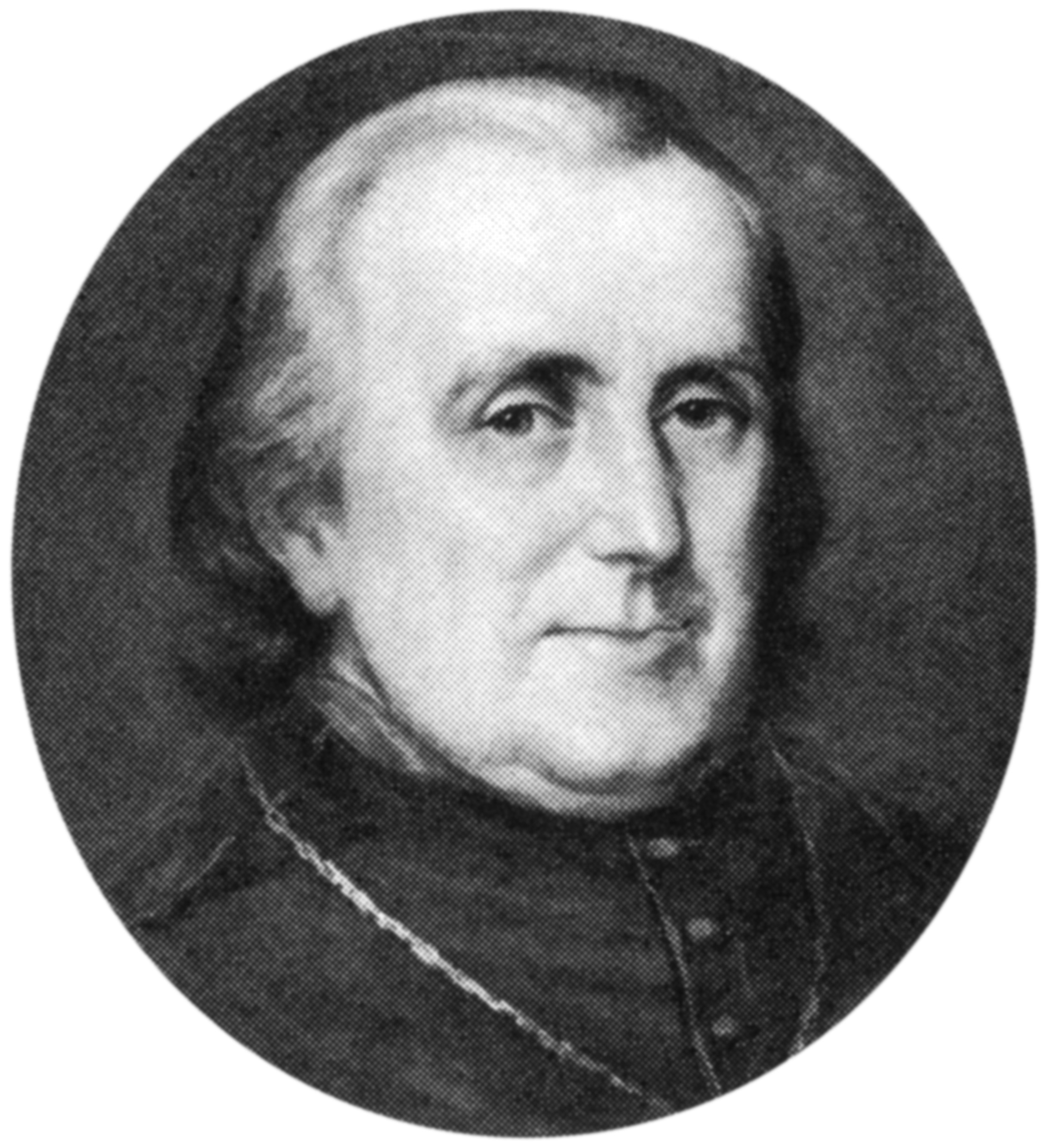
- Church: Catholic
- Diocese: Bardstown
- Appointed: 21 March 1834
- Predecessor: John Baptist Mary David
- Successor: Richard Pius Miles

Orders
- Ordination: 21 December 1811 by Benedict Joseph Flaget
- Consecration: 20 July 1834 by Benedict Joseph Flaget

Personal details
- Born: 27 December 1787 La Chambre, Savoie, France
- Died: 21 November 1868 (aged 80) Mauriac, France

Guy Ignatius Chabrat, P.S.S. (December 27, 1787 – November 21, 1868) was a French Catholic missionary who served as Coadjutor Bishop of Bardstown from 1834 to 1847. A member of the Sulpicians, he was the first Catholic priest ordained west of the Alleghenies.

== Biography ==
Guy Ignace Chabrat was born in Le Vigean, Cantal, to Pierre and Louise (née Lavialle) Chabrat; he was a relative of Peter Joseph Lavialle, Bishop of Louisville (1865–67). He studied at a Sulpician seminary and was ordained a subdeacon in 1809. In 1811, he accepted an invitation from Bishop Benedict Joseph Flaget to join the Diocese of Bardstown, Kentucky, arriving in the United States in May of that year. He was ordained to the diaconate on September 2, 1811, at Holy Cross Church and the priesthood on Christmas of the same year at St. Rose Priory. Both Orders were conferred by Flaget.

Chabrat was first assigned to St. Michael's Church, Fairfield (Kentucky) and St. Clare's Church, Colesburg (Kentucky), while also attending to a mission near Bardstown. He briefly served as pastor of St. Pius' Church in Scott County (1823). Following the death of Rev. Charles Nerinckx, he became superior of the Sisters of Loretto in 1824.

On March 21, 1834, Chabrat was appointed Coadjutor Bishop of Bardstown and Titular Bishop of Bolina by Pope Gregory XVI. He received his episcopal consecration on the following July 20 from Bishop Flaget, with Bishops John Baptist Mary David, P.S.S., and Richard Pius Miles, O.P., serving as co-consecrators. He assumed much of the administration of the diocese for the aged Flaget, including the move of the episcopal see to Louisville in 1841.

Threatened with complete blindness, he sought treatment in Europe and later resigned as Coadjutor Bishop on April 10, 1847. He retired to his native France on a comfortable pension, dying in Mauriac at age 80.
