= Denis O'Donaghue =

American prelate

- Bishop Emeritus of Louisville
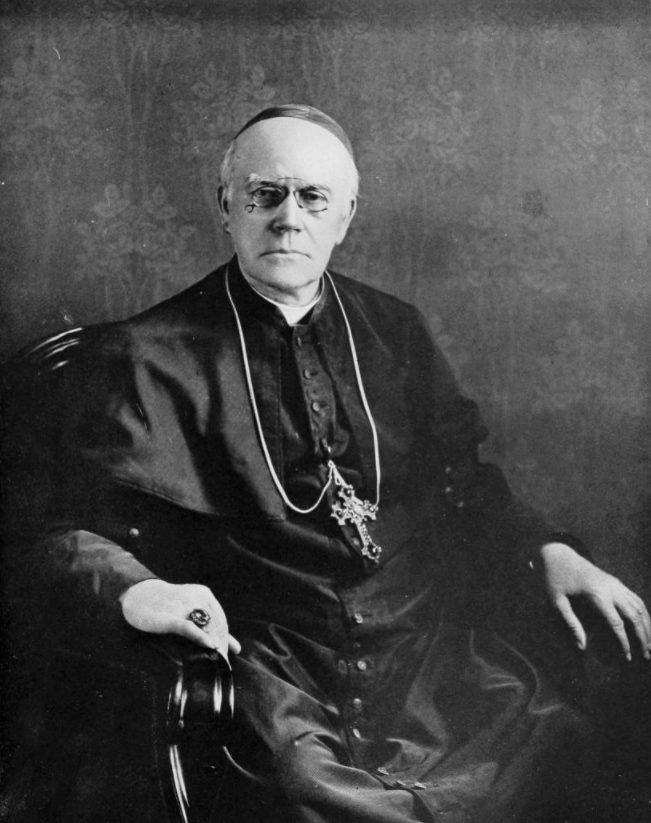
- Archdiocese: Diocese of Louisville
- Appointed: February 7, 1910
- Term ended: July 26, 1924
- Predecessor: William George McCloskey
- Successor: John A. Floersh
- Other post: Auxiliary Bishop of Indianapolis (1900–1910)

Orders
- Ordination: September 6, 1874 by Jacques-Maurice De Saint Palais
- Consecration: April 25, 1900 by William Henry Elder

Personal details
- Born: November 30, 1848 Daviess County, Indiana, U.S.
- Died: November 7, 1925 (aged 76) Louisville, Kentucky, U.S.

Denis O'Donaghue (November 30, 1848 – November 7, 1925) was an American prelate of the Catholic Church. He served as Bishop of Louisville from 1910 to 1924.

== Biography ==
=== Early life ===
O'Donaghue was born on a farm in Daviess County, Indiana, to Irish immigrants James and Mary (née Toomey) O'Donaghue. Five of his sisters became religious sisters, and one brother also became a priest. He attended Saint Meinrad Seminary for a year before transferring to Saint Thomas Seminary in Bardstown, Kentucky. In 1871 he entered the Grand Séminaire de Montréal, where he completed his theological studies.

=== Priesthood ===
O'Donaghue was ordained a priest on September 6, 1874, by Bishop Jacques-Maurice De Saint Palais. His first assignment was as assistant pastor to Rev. Augustus Bessonies at St. John the Evangelist Church in Indianapolis. In 1878, when Silas Chatard became Bishop of Vincennes (renamed the Diocese of Indianapolis in 1898), he named O'Donaghue as chancellor of the diocese. He retained his duties at St. John's until February 1885, when he became pastor of St. Patrick Church in the same city and held that position for 25 years (until he went to Louisville). He was also named vicar general of the diocese in March 1899.

=== Episcopal ministry ===
On February 13, 1900, O'Donaghue was appointed auxiliary bishop of Indianapolis and titular bishop of Pomaria by Pope Leo XIII. He was the first auxiliary bishop in the entire state of Indiana. He received his episcopal consecration on the following April 25 from Archbishop William Henry Elder, with Bishops John Samuel Foley and Thomas Sebastian Byrne serving as co-consecrators, at St. John's Church in Indianapolis.

O'Donaghue was named the fifth Bishop of Louisville, Kentucky, on February 7, 1910. He succeeded the late Bishop William George McCloskey, at whose funeral O'Donaghue had preached the previous September. Over the next 14 years, he guided the Catholics of central Kentucky through difficulties like World War I and the 1918 influenza pandemic. He closed the diocese's churches during the pandemic, saying "the civil laws of the community always take precedence over the laws of the church" and adding "I think it was a good thing and the only thing to do." For his efforts and those of the religious sisters and Knights of Columbus in Louisville during the pandemic, General Fred Thaddeus Austin of Camp Zachary Taylor wrote him a public letter of gratitude.

Given his advanced age and ill health, O'Donaghue requested a coadjutor bishop to succeed him, and received 36-year-old John A. Floersh in February 1923. He subsequently resigned as Bishop of Louisville on July 26, 1924, at which time he was also named titular bishop of Lesvi. He celebrated the golden jubilee of his priestly ordination the following September and the silver jubilee of his episcopal consecration in February 1925.

O'Donaghue died in Louisville on November 7, 1925, at age 76.

Catholic Church titles
Preceded by William George McCloskey	Bishop of Louisville; 1910–1924	Succeeded by John A. Floersh
