= John A. Floersh =

American bishop (1886–1968)

John Alexander Floersh
- Archbishop emeritus of Louisville
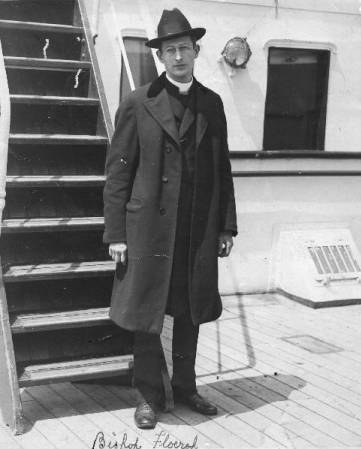
- Archbishop Floersh, c. 1924
- Archdiocese: Archdiocese of Louisville
- Predecessor: Denis O'Donaghue
- Successor: Thomas Joseph McDonough

Orders
- Ordination: June 10, 1911
- Consecration: April 8, 1923 by Giovanni Bonzano
- Rank: 21st

Personal details
- Born: John Alexander Floersh; October 5, 1886 Nashville, Tennessee, U.S.
- Died: June 11, 1968 (aged 81) Louisville, Kentucky, U.S.
- Buried: Calvary Cemetery; Louisville, Kentucky
- Denomination: Roman Catholic
- Parents: John Floersh; Minnie Floersh (née Alexander)
- Education: Pontifical Urbaniana University
- Coat of arms

John Alexander Floersh (October 5, 1886 – June 11, 1968) was an American bishop of the Roman Catholic Church. Becoming Bishop of Louisville in 1924, he was elevated to the rank of archbishop in 1937 and served until his retirement in 1967.

== Early life and priesthood ==
John Floersh was born in Nashville, Tennessee, the fourth of eight children of John and Minnie (née Alexander) Floersh. His father was a cigar manufacturer. He began his studies for the priesthood at age sixteen, and earned his Doctor of Philosophy (1907) and Doctor of Divinity (1911) degrees from the Propaganda College in Rome.

He was ordained a priest in Rome on June 10, 1911. Returning to the United States, he did pastoral work in the Diocese of Nashville for a year before becoming secretary to Archbishop Giovanni Bonzano, the Apostolic Delegate in Washington, D.C. He was named a Monsignor by Pope Benedict XV in 1917.

== Episcopal ministry ==
On February 6, 1923, Floersh was appointed coadjutor bishop of the Diocese of Louisville, Kentucky, and titular bishop of Lycopolis by Pope Pius XI. He received his episcopal consecration on the following April 8 from Archbishop Bonzano, with Archbishop Francesco Marchetti Selvaggiani and Bishop Michele Cerrati serving as co-consecrators. Following the retirement of Bishop Denis O'Donaghue, Floersh succeeded him as Bishop of Louisville on July 26, 1924. When the Diocese of Louisville was elevated to the rank of an archdiocese on December 10, 1937, Floersh became its first Archbishop.

During his tenure, Floersh greatly increased the number of parishes, schools, and other institutions. He established Bellarmine University, Catholic Charities, annual Corpus Christi processions, and St. Thomas Seminary (which was open from 1952 to 1970). In 1941, he criticized The Courier-Journal for featuring a full-page advertisement for birth control. He also called on Kentucky Catholics to support the civil rights movement. Despite this public support, he was held responsible for the refusal to admit a young black student to the local minor seminary on the basis of his race. The young man, Boniface Hardin, went on to become a Benedictine monk, priest and civil rights leader. Between 1962 and 1965, Foersh attended all four sessions of the Second Vatican Council, where he was the 21st-ranking bishop in terms of seniority.

== Later life ==
After forty-three years as head of the Diocese of Louisville, Floersh resigned on March 1, 1967, after Pope Paul VI called for the voluntary retirement of resident bishops older than 75. He died just over a year later, on June 11, 1968, at age 81. He is buried in Calvary Cemetery.

Catholic Church titles
Preceded by Denis O'Donaghue	Bishop of Louisville; 1924–1937	Succeeded by none (elevation of See)
Preceded by none (elevation of See)	Archbishop of Louisville; 1937–1967	Succeeded by Thomas J. McDonough
