= Thomas J. McDonough =

American prelate

His Excellency, The Most Reverend Thomas Joseph McDonough
- Archbishop of Louisville; Titular Bishop of Thenae
- See: Archdiocese of Louisville
- Installed: May 2, 1967
- Term ended: September 29, 1981
- Predecessor: John A. Floersh
- Successor: Thomas C. Kelly
- Other posts: Auxiliary Bishop of St. Augustine (1947–1957); Auxiliary Bishop of Savannah (1957–1960); Bishop of Savannah (1960–1967)

Orders
- Ordination: May 26, 1938 by Hugh L. Lamb
- Consecration: April 30, 1947 by Dennis Joseph Dougherty

Personal details
- Born: December 5, 1911 Philadelphia, Pennsylvania, US
- Died: August 4, 1998 (aged 86) Darby, Pennsylvania, US
- Education: St. Charles Borromeo Seminary; Catholic University of America
- Motto: Nihil sine Deo (Nothing without God)

Thomas Joseph McDonough (December 5, 1911 – August 4, 1998) was an American prelate of the Roman Catholic Church. He served as an auxiliary bishop of the Diocese of St. Augustine in Florida (1947–1957), as auxiliary bishop and bishop of the Diocese of Savannah in Georgia (1957–1967) and as archbishop of the Archdiocese of Louisville in Kentucky (1967–1981).

== Biography ==
=== Early life ===
Thomas McDonough was born on December 5, 1911, in Philadelphia, Pennsylvania, to Michael Francis and Mary Margaret (Nolan) McDonough. After graduating from West Philadelphia Catholic High School, he studied at St. Charles Borromeo Seminary in Wynnewood, Pennsylvania.

=== Priesthood ===
McDonough was ordained to the priesthood for the Diocese of Greensburg by Bishop Hugh L. Lamb on May 26, 1938. In 1941, McDonough earned a Doctor of Canon Law degree from The Catholic University of America in Washington, D.C.

McDonough was incardinated, or transferred, in 1941 to the Diocese of St. Augustine, where he served as pastor of St. Joseph's Parish in Jacksonville, Florida (1942–1943) and rector of the Cathedral of St. Augustine in St. Augustine, Florida (1943–1945). He also served as chancellor (1944–1947) and vicar general (1947–1957) of the diocese. McDonough then served as pastor of St. Paul's Parish in Jacksonville Beach, Florida.

=== Auxiliary Bishop of St. Augustine ===
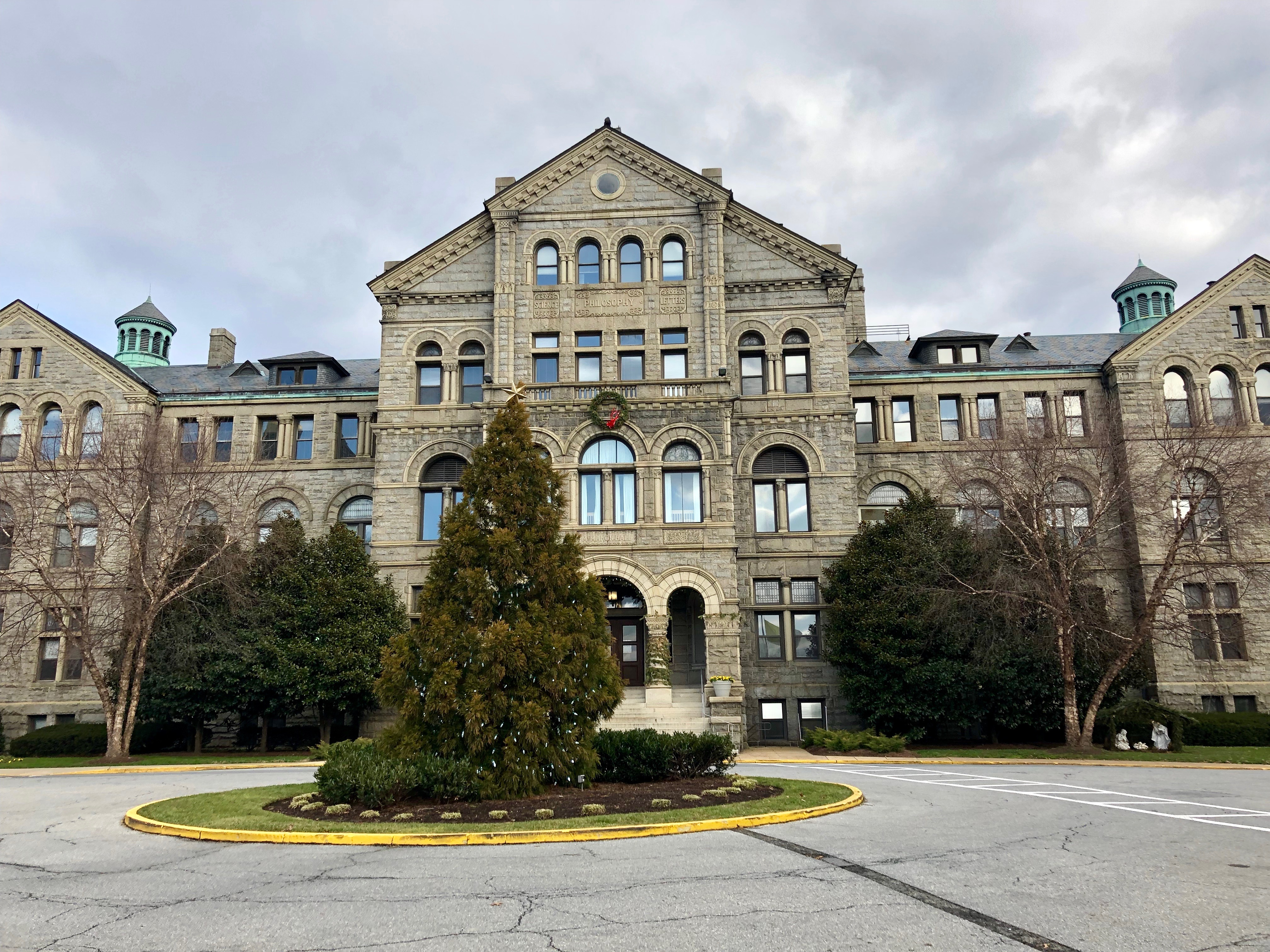
Catholic University of America, Washington, D.C. (2023)

On March 10, 1947, McDonough was appointed auxiliary bishop of St. Augustine and titular bishop of Thenae by Pope Pius XII. He received his episcopal consecration on April 30, 1947, from Cardinal Dennis Dougherty, with Bishops Emmet M. Walsh and J. Carroll McCormick serving as co-consecrators. At age 35, McDonough was then the youngest member of the American hierarchy. During his tenure as an auxiliary bishop, he was responsible for much land purchasing, fund-raising, church building, and work with African Americans.

=== Auxiliary Bishop and Bishop of Savannah ===
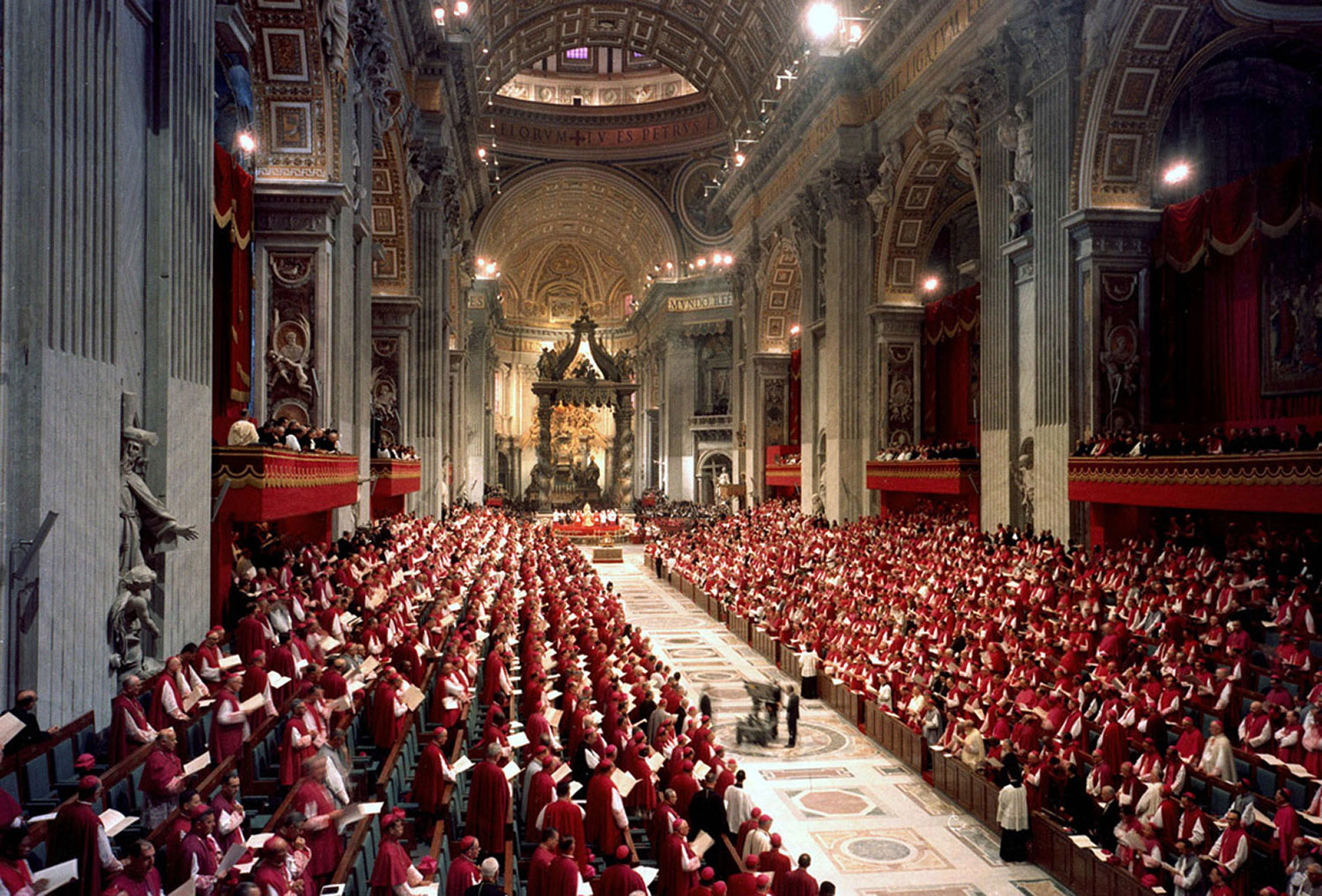
Second Vatican Council, Rome (between 1962 and 1965)

Pope John XXIII appointed McDonough as an auxiliary bishop of Savannah on January 2, 1957. He succeeded Bishop Gerald O'Hara as the tenth bishop of Savannah on March 2, 1960. McDonough attended the Second Vatican Council in Rome from 1962 to 1965 during the American Civil Rights Movement. He signed the "Pentecost Statement" of the bishops of the Atlanta Province, condemning racial discrimination as contrary to Christian principles.

=== Archbishop of Louisville ===
Pope Paul VI appointed McDonough as archbishop of Louisville on March 1, 1967. A self-described "Vatican II bishop," McDonough implemented the Second Vatican Council's reforms and guided the archdiocese through an intensive period of activity and change. His tenure saw advances in liturgical renewal, ecumenism, and lay involvement.

=== Retirement ===
On September 29, 1981, Pope John Paul II accepted McDonough's resignation as Archbishop of Louisville. Thomas McDonough died on August 4, 1998, in Darby, Pennsylvania, at age 86. He is buried at Calvary Cemetery in Louisville.

== Viewpoints ==
=== Roe v. Wade ===
On January 22, 1973, when the U.S. Supreme Court issued the Roe v. Wade decision legalizing abortion up to the third-trimester, McDonough issued a statement calling the day "Blue Monday" and saying that it was

"...overtly a violation of individual rights. It comes at a time too when efforts have been made to close down the war in Vietnam and to save the lives of all the people who have been endangered by that war. Now we hear the highest court in the land has declared an assault upon the life of the unborn child."

== See also ==
- Catholic Church hierarchy
- Catholic Church in the United States
- Historical list of the Catholic bishops of the United States
- List of Catholic bishops of the United States
- Lists of patriarchs, archbishops, and bishops

Catholic Church titles
Preceded by –	Auxiliary Bishop of St. Augustine; 1947–1957	Succeeded by –
Preceded by –	Auxiliary Bishop of Savannah; 1957–1960	Succeeded by –
Preceded by Gerald O'Hara	Bishop of Savannah; 1960–1967	Succeeded by Gerard Louis Frey
Preceded by John A. Floersh	Archbishop of Louisville; 1967–1981	Succeeded by Thomas C. Kelly
