= Archdiocese of Louisville =

Latin Catholic ecclesiastical jurisdiction in Kentucky, United States

Coordinates: 38°14′34″N 85°45′07″W

Archdiocese of Louisville Archidiœcesis Ludovicopolitana
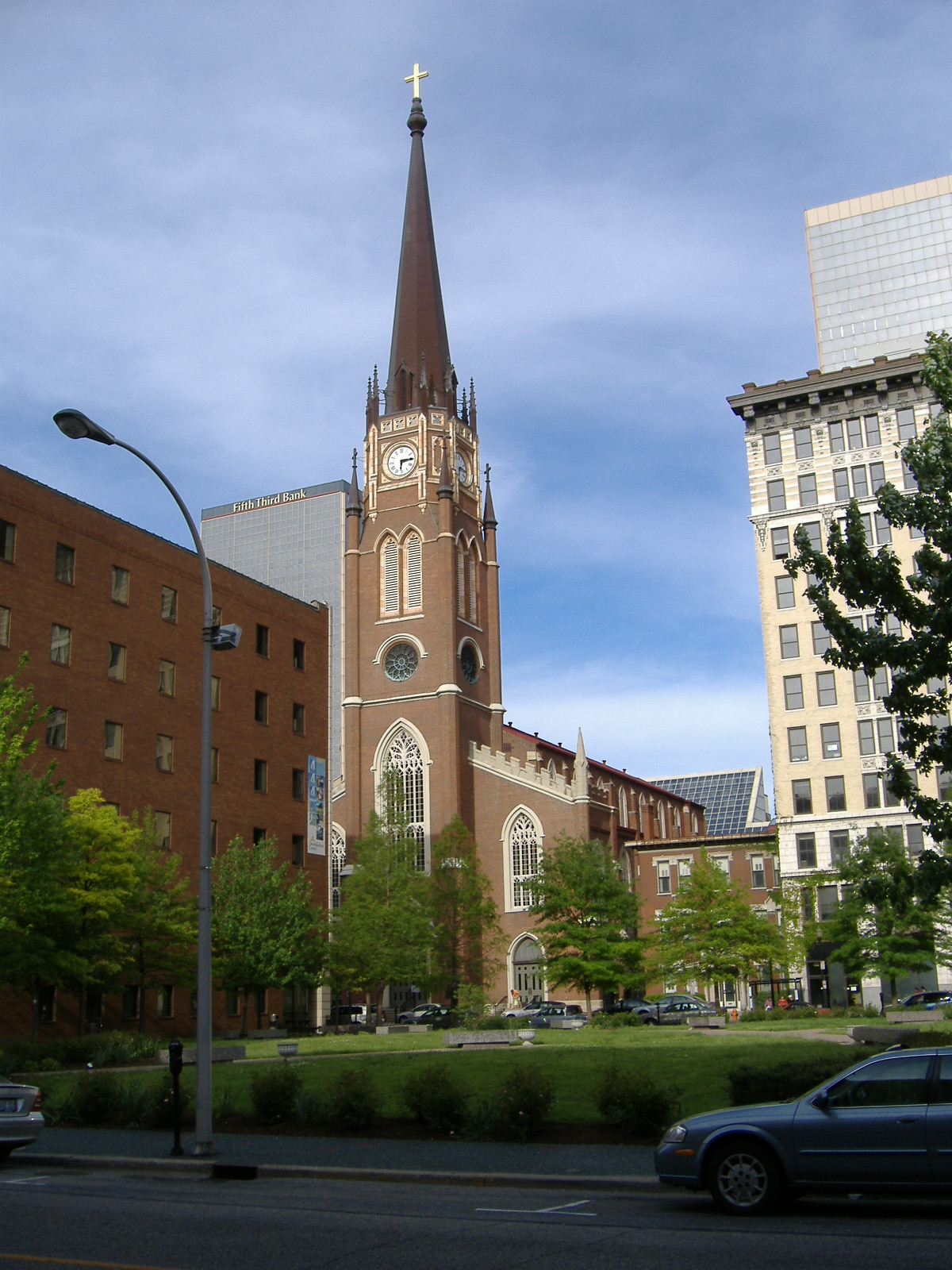
- Cathedral of the Assumption

- Coat of arms

Location
- Country: United States
- Territory: Central Kentucky
- Ecclesiastical province: Louisville

Statistics
- Population: Total; Catholics: (as of 2023); 1,319,621; 164,784 (12.5%)
- Parishes: 110
- Schools: 46 K–12 schools 3 colleges/universities

Information
- Denomination: Catholic Church
- Sui iuris church: Latin Church
- Rite: Roman Rite
- Established: April 8, 1808
- Cathedral: Cathedral of the Assumption
- Patron saint: Saint Joseph

Current leadership
- Pope: Leo XIV
- Metropolitan Archbishop: Shelton Fabre
- Vicar General: Jeffrey P. Shooner
- Bishops emeritus: Joseph Edward Kurtz

Map
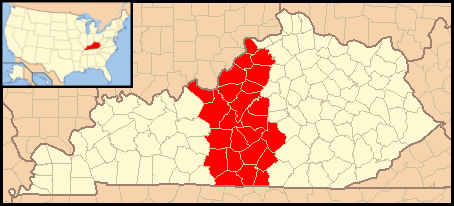

Website
- archlou.org

The Archdiocese of Louisville (Latin: Archidiœcesis Ludovicopolitanais) is an archdiocese of the Catholic Church in central Kentucky in the United States. The cathedral church of the archdiocese is the Cathedral of the Assumption in Louisville. The archdiocese is the seat of the metropolitan see of the province of Louisville, which encompasses the states of Kentucky and Tennessee. It is the second-oldest diocese west of the Appalachian Mountains. The archbishop is Shelton Fabre.

== Territory ==
The Archdiocese of Louisville consists of these 24 counties in central Kentucky: Adair, Barren, Bullitt, Casey, Clinton, Cumberland, Green, Hardin, Hart, Henry, Jefferson, Larue, Marion, Meade, Metcalfe, Monroe, Nelson, Oldham, Russell, Shelby, Spencer, Taylor, Trimble, and Washington counties. The Archdiocese covers 8,124 square miles (21,040 km^{2}).

== Statistics ==
As of 2023, the archdiocese had a Catholic population of approximately 200,000. The archdiocese operated 110 parishes and missions staffed by 127 diocesan priests, 131 permanent deacons, 39 religious institute priests, nine extern priests, 61 religious brothers, and 363 religious sisters. The archdiocese had 48 Catholic elementary and high schools serving more than 18,000 students. The archdiocese served more than 233,900 persons in Catholic hospitals, health care centers, homes for the aged, and specialized homes.

== History ==
=== 1700 to 1808 ===
Prior to the American Revolution, present-day Kentucky was part of the British Province of Virginia. To prevent hostility with Native American peoples in the region, the British did not allow European settlers to move west of the Appalachian Mountains. After the Revolution ended in 1781, settlers from the original 13 states, including Catholics, started flooding into the region.

The Vatican in 1784 removed the new United States from the jurisdiction of the Diocese of London, establishing the Prefecture Apostolic of United States of America, a jurisdiction in the United States. The first Catholic presence in Kentucky may have been a group of 25 families who traveled from Maryland in 1785 to Goodwin's Station in present-day Nelson County and founded Holy Cross Church. This was the first church in the present-day archdiocese. Most of the early Catholic settlers in Kentucky were English-Catholics from Maryland.

The Vatican in 1789 elevated the prefecture to the Diocese of Baltimore, the first diocese in the United States, covering the entire nation. The first Catholic church west of the Appalachian Mountains, Holy Cross, was constructed at Pottinger Creek in 1792. In 1792, the Commonwealth of Kentucky was admitted to the union. In 1793, Stephen T. Badin estimated that 300 Catholic families were living in Kentucky, clustered in six settlements around Bardstown. These Catholics had left Maryland due to the religious persecution of Catholics there.

=== 1808 to 1841 ===
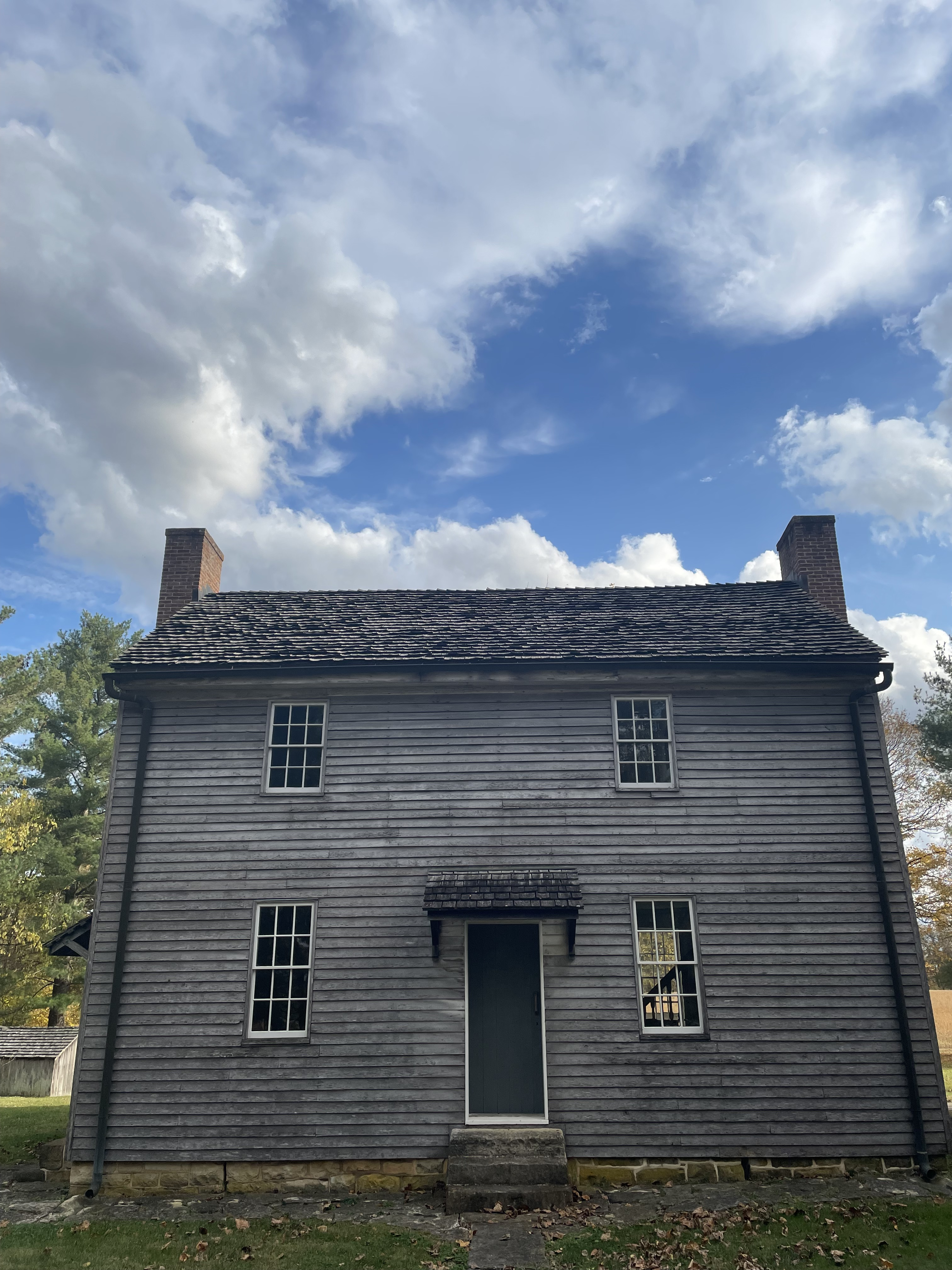
Original St. Thomas Seminary and Chapel Building, built in 1795 (2023)

In 1808, Pope Pius VII created four new dioceses out of the Diocese of Baltimore. One of these dioceses was the Diocese of Bardstown. The pope chose Bardstown because it already had a significant Catholic population. The new diocese included all of Kentucky along with a vast area of the American Midwest and South, from the Great Lakes to the Gulf Coast, out to the Mississippi River. The pope appointed Benedict Flaget as the first bishop of Bardstown. Flaget resisted the appointment, but Pius VII insisted he take it.

Needing to ordain more priests, Flaget in 1811 started St. Thomas Seminary near Bardstown. It was the first Catholic seminary outside of the original 13 colonies. Flaget started construction of St. Joseph Cathedral in Bardstown in 1816. Many Protestants helped fund its construction as they felt it would increase the area's prestige. Flaget celebrated the first mass at St. Joseph in 1819, although the cathedral was not completed until 1823. Also in 1819, Flaget founded St. Joseph's College in Bardstown.

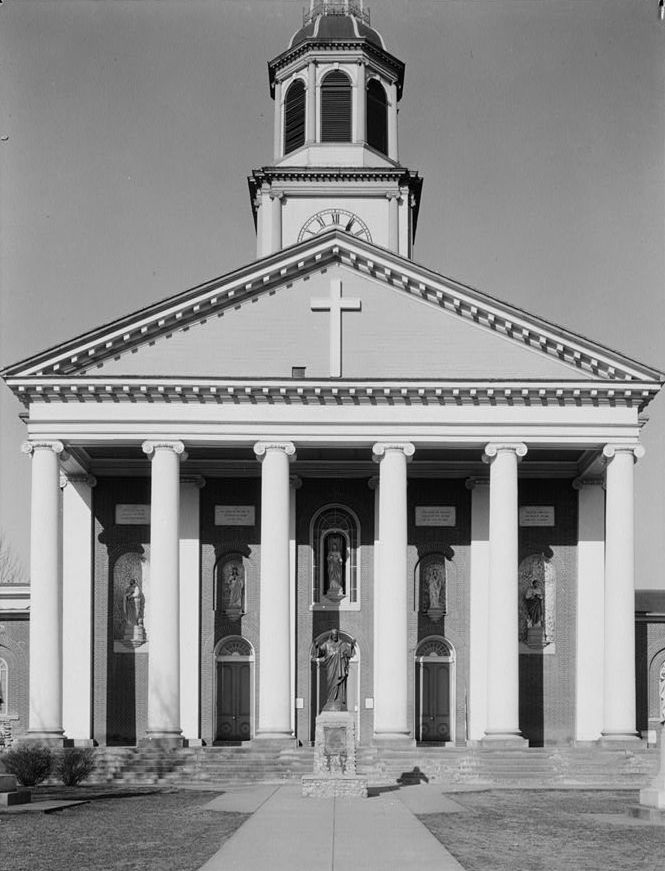
St. Joseph Proto-Cathedral (1934)

Over the coming years, the Vatican started reducing the size of the Diocese of Bardstown. It created the Diocese of Cincinnati in 1821. That same year, William Byrne founded St. Mary's College near Lebanon. Flaget tried to resign as bishop in 1833, but the Vatican forced him to stay in that position.

In 1834, Pope Gregory XVI erected the Diocese of Vincennes. The first German Catholic church in Louisville, St. Boniface, was founded in 1836; it is today the oldest continually operating parish in the city. Three years later, Gregory XVI erected the Diocese of Nashville. With the creation of these new dioceses, the Diocese of Bardstown now included just Kentucky.

To address the shortage of clergy in his diocese, Flaget in 1835 left for Europe, where he would spend the next four years recruiting seminarians to come to Kentucky. During his absence, Coadjutor Bishop Guy Ignatius Chabrat administered the diocese. At this point, Flaget had founded four colleges, a large orphanage and infirmary for girls and eleven academies for girls. He had introduced three congregations of religious sisters and four religious orders of men into the diocese. Flaget returned to Kentucky in 1839.

=== 1841 to 1855 ===
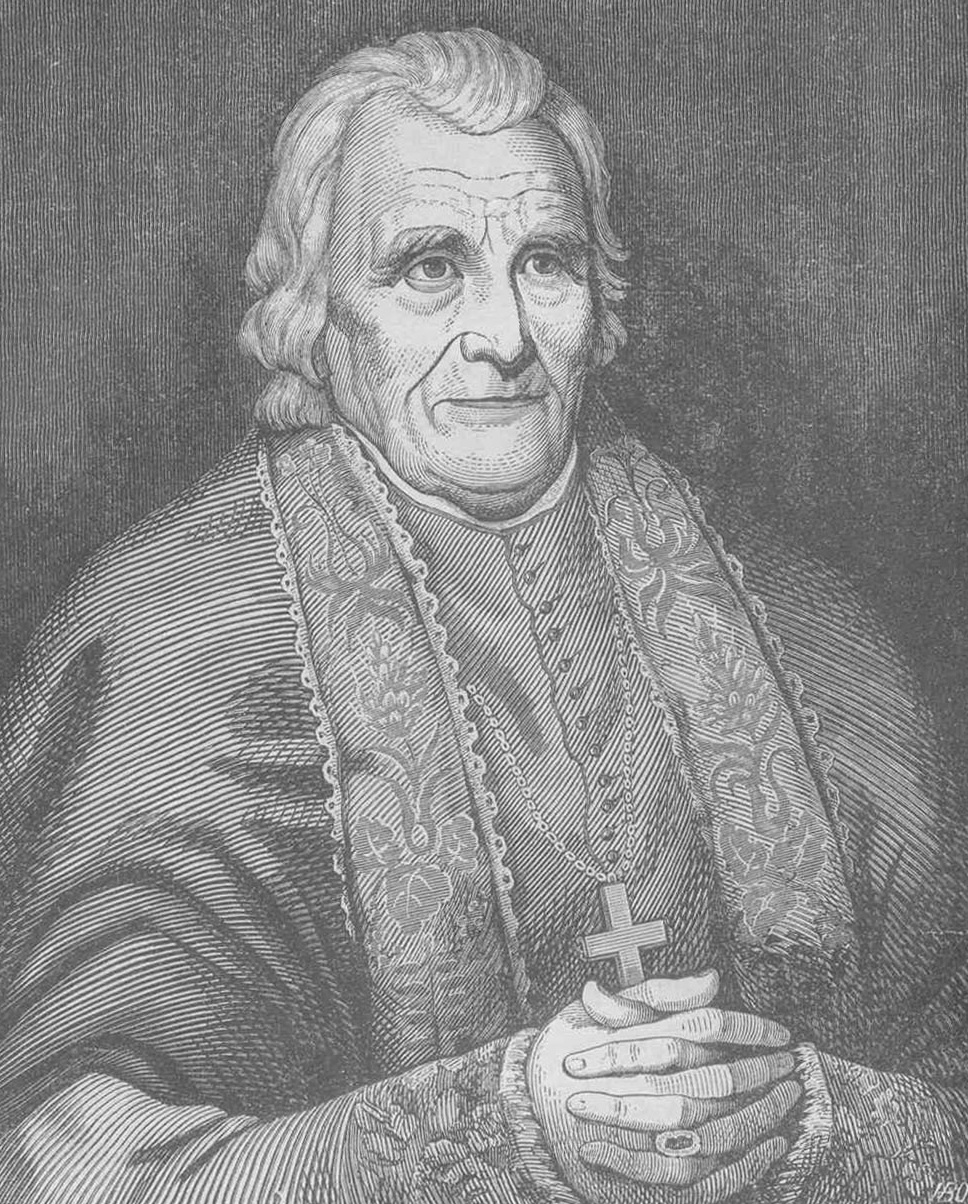
Bishop Flaget (1852)

In 1841, recognizing the increased population and importance of Louisville, Gregory XVI suppressed the Diocese of Bardstown and erected the Diocese of Louisville in its place. He designated St. Louis Church in Louisville as its new cathedral. Like the Diocese of Bardstown, the new diocese covered the entire state of Kentucky. Flaget became the first bishop of Louisville.

In 1848, Pope Pius IX appointed Martin Spalding as coadjutor bishop in Louisville to assist Flaget. That same year, 40 Trappists monks purchased 1,600 acres in Nelson County from the Sisters of Loretto. It became Gethsemani Abbey in 1850, the first Trappist monastery in the United States. Seeing the need for a new cathedral, Flaget started construction of the Cathedral of the Assumption in 1849. The new cathedral was built around the older St. Louis Cathedral; workers disassembled the old structure, carrying it out piece by piece through the doors of the new cathedral.

After Flaget's death in 1850, Spalding automatically succeeded him as bishop of Louisville. When Spalding became bishop, the diocese had a Catholic population exceeding 30,000, with 43 churches, ten chapels, and 40 priests. One of his first acts was to visit every parish, school and other Catholic institution in the diocese. He founded an orphanage for boys in 1850. He continued the construction of the Cathedral of the Assumption, dedicating it in 1852.

In 1853, Pope Pius IX erected the Diocese of Covington, taking Eastern Kentucky from the Diocese of Louisville. By the late 19th century, large numbers of German and Irish Catholic immigrants were arriving in Louisville.

=== 1855 to 1910 ===
Bloody Monday riots of 1855 (1922)

In 1855, an anti-Catholic riot, later known as Bloody Monday, erupted in Louisville. As an election approached in August 1885, tensions were rising in the city. Opponents of the Democratic Party and supporters of the anti-Catholic Know Nothing movement were spreading rumors. They claimed that immigrant Catholics were planning to overthrow the US Government and that Spalding was hiding weapons for this insurrection in his churches. On election day, rioters attacked German Catholics as they arrived at polling stations. Mobs then started burning homes in an Irish neighborhood. Louisville Mayor John Barbee, himself a member of the Know Nothing Party, saved the Cathedral of the Assumption from destruction during the riot.

Between 22 and 100 Catholics were killed before the Bloody Monday riot was suppressed. Following the riot, Spalding wrote, "I entreat all to pause and reflect, to commit no violence, to believe no idle rumors, and to cultivate that peace and love which are characteristics of the religion of Christ." In 1861, after the start of the American Civil War, Spalding closed St. Joseph's College and converted its facilities into a military hospital for soldiers. In 1864, Spalding became archbishop of Baltimore.

To replace Spalding, Pius IX named Peter Lavialle in 1865 as the next bishop of Louisville. During his two-year tenure, Lavialle conducted diocesan visitations, invited the Dominican Fathers to the diocese and erected four churches in Louisville. Lavialle died in 1867.

=== 1868 to 1937 ===
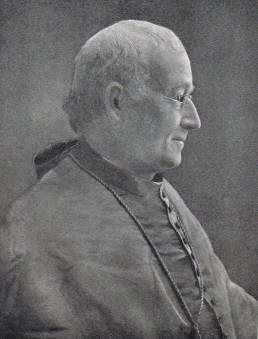
Bishop McCloskey (pre-1909)

William McCloskey, rector of the Pontifical North American College in Rome, was appointed bishop of Louisville in 1868 by Pius IX. When McCloskey took office, the diocese had 64 churches. He introduced the Passionists, the Benedictines, the Fathers of the Resurrection, the Little Sisters of the Poor, the Franciscan Sisters, and the Brothers of Mary into the diocese to run schools and staff institutions. In 1869, McCloskey brought the Sisters of Mercy to Louisville to operate the U.S. Marine Hospital. That same year, he established Preston Park Seminary in Louisville. When McCloskey died in 1909, the diocese had 165 churches.

After McCloskey died in 1909, Auxiliary Bishop Denis O'Donaghue from the Diocese of Indianapolis was the next bishop. During the 1918 influenza pandemic, O'Donaghue closed the diocese's churches. He stated "the civil laws of the community always take precedence over the laws of the church." For his efforts and those of the religious sisters and Knights of Columbus in Louisville during the pandemic, General Fred Thaddeus Austin of Camp Zachary Taylor wrote him a public letter of gratitude. The Sisters of Charity opened Nazareth College in Louisville in 1920, the first four-year Catholic college in the archdiocese for women. It is today Spalding University.

In 1923, the Vatican appointed John A. Floersh of Nashville as coadjutor bishop in the diocese to assist O'Donoghue. When O'Donoghue died in 1924, Floersh became bishop of Louisville. In 1931, the Dominican Sisters founded St. Catharine Junior College at Springfield.

=== 1937 to 1981 ===
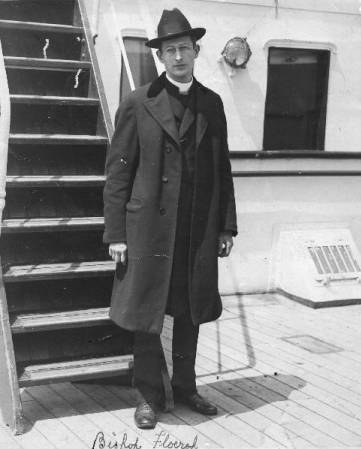
Archbishop Floersh (1924)

On December 9, 1937, Pope Pius XI elevated the Diocese of Louisville to the Archdiocese of Louisville. At the same time, the pope erected the Diocese of Owensboro, taking western Kentucky from the new archdiocese. The Dioceses of Covington, Owensboro, and Nashville were now designated as suffragan dioceses of the archdiocese. The pope named Floersh as the first archbishop of Louisville. In 1941, Floersh criticized The Courier-Journal in Louisville for featuring a full-page advertisement for birth control devices.

During his tenure as bishop and archbishop, Floersh increased the number of parishes and schools in the archdiocese. He established Bellarmine College in 1950 in Louisville; it is today Bellarmine University. Floresch also established the local Catholic Charities agency, the annual Corpus Christi processions, and St. Thomas Seminary in Louisville in 1952. He also called on Kentucky Catholics to support the American civil rights movement. Floersh retired in 1967.

The second archbishop of Louisville was Bishop Thomas J. McDonough from the Diocese of Savannah, named by Pope Paul VI in 1967. A self-described "Vatican II bishop", McDonough implemented the Second Vatican Council's reforms in the archdiocese. His tenure saw advances in liturgical renewal, ecumenism, and lay involvement. In 1970, Paul VI erected the Diocese of Memphis, making it another suffragan of the Archdiocese of Louisville. McDonough retired in 1981.

=== 1981 to present ===
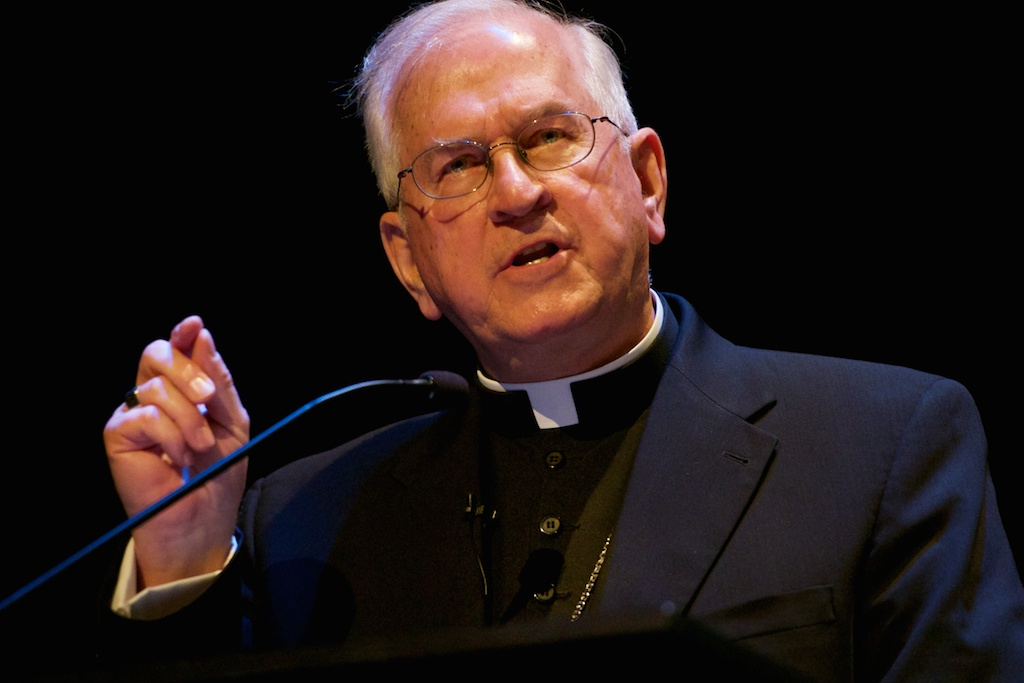
Archbishop Kurtz (2020)

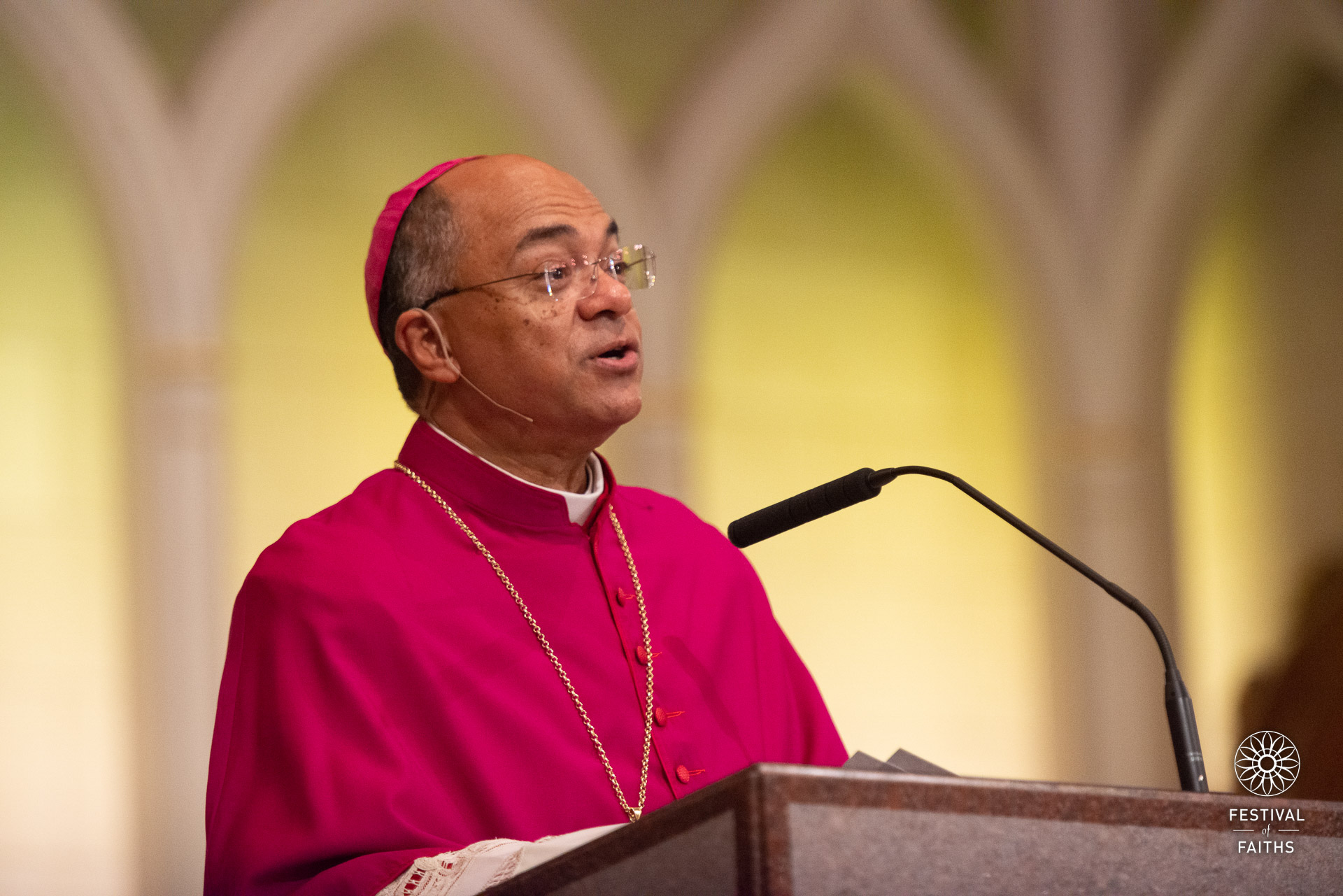
Archbishop Fabre (2022)

In 1981, Pope John Paul II appointed Auxiliary Bishop Thomas C. Kelly from the Archdiocese of Washington as the next archbishop of Louisville. Kelly led the restoration of the Cathedral of the Assumption in Louisville, pushed for interfaith dialogue, and worked for increased lay person leadership in the archdiocese. He started a Campaign for Excellence program that reversed the enrollment decline at Catholic schools in the archdiocese. Kelly admitted to developing an opioid addiction while recovering from surgery for lung cancer, only recognizing the problem after being confronted by his doctors.

In 1988, Pope John Paul II erected the Dioceses of Lexington and Knoxville, designating both new dioceses as suffragan dioceses of the Archdiocese of Louisville. This action established the present configuration of the province of Louisville. Kelly retired as archbishop in 2007 after 19 years in office. Pope Benedict XVI in 2007 named Bishop Joseph Kurtz of Knoxville as the next archbishop of Louisville. St. Catharine College in Springfield closed in 2016 due to a financial shortfall. In July 2019, Kurtz underwent treatment for urothelial cancer, which required a three-month medical leave of absence from the archdiocese. Kurtz retired in 2022.

Bishop Shelton Fabre from the Diocese of Houma-Thibodaux was named by Pope Francis in 2022 as archbishop of Louisville. In April 2025, the Catholic Education Foundation announced a $100 million capital campaign in the archdiocese to assist families in paying tuition at Catholic schools. At the time of the announcement, the foundation had received $80 million in pledges.

=== Sexual abuse ===
In the wake of the uncovering of widespread sexual abuse in the Archdiocese of Louisville in 2002, it was revealed that Bishop Kelly played a part in reassigning priests he knew or suspected had abused children and reaching confidential settlements with victims. Kelly resisted calls for him to resign.

In March 2003, Louis E. Miller pleaded guilty to 44 counts of indecent and immoral practices and six counts of sexual abuse, involving 21 victims. Miller was sentenced to 20 years in prison, where he died in 2017. In June 2003, the archdiocese paid $25.7 million to settle claims of sexual abuse by clergy from the 1940s to 1997.

Steve Pohl, pastor of St. Margaret Mary Catholic Community in Louisville, was arrested in Indian Rocks Beach, Florida in August 2015 and charged with possession of child pornography. He pleaded guilty in January 2016 and was sentenced to 33 months in prison.

Joseph Hemmerle was convicted in 2016 of inappropriately touching a ten-year-old boy in 1973 while serving as director at Camp Tall Trees in Brandenburg. Hemmerle received a seven-year prison sentence. In 2017, Hemmerle pleaded guilty to molesting another boy at the camp in 1977 and 1978; he received a two-year sentence.

The archdiocese in 2019 released Restoring Trust: Report on Sexual Abuse in the Archdiocese of Louisville. It was the result of an independent investigation by Mark Miller, a former commissioner of the Kentucky State Police, of allegations of sexual abuse from 1922 to 2019. He found significant failures in the past of reporting sexual abuse allegations to authorities. The last credible accusation of sexual abuse of a minor dated back to the 1980s.

In February 2024 Jordan Fautz, a lay teacher of religion at the St. Stephen Martyr middle and elementary schools, was arrested by the Federal Bureau of Investigation (FBI) on child pornography charges. Several of his victims filed a lawsuit against the archdiocese in March 2024. Fautz pleaded guilty in December 2024 to seven child pornography charges. He was sentenced in March 2025 to 19 years in federal prison.

== Bishops ==
=== Bishops of Bardstown ===
1. Benedict Joseph Flaget (1808–1832), resigned but reappointed in 1833
2. John Baptist Mary David (1832–1833; coadjutor bishop 1819–1832)
3. Benedict Joseph Flaget (1833–1841), title changed with title of diocese
  Guy Ignatius Chabrat (coadjutor bishop 1834–1841), title changed with title of diocese

=== Bishops of Louisville ===
1. Benedict Joseph Flaget (1841–1850)
  – Guy Ignatius Chabrat, S.S. (coadjutor bishop 1841–1847), resigned before succession
2. Martin John Spalding (1850–1864; coadjutor bishop 1848–1850), appointed Archbishop of Baltimore
3. Peter Joseph Lavialle (1865–1867)
4. William George McCloskey (1868–1909)
5. Denis O'Donaghue (1910–1924)
6. John A. Floersh (1924–1937); elevated to Archbishop

=== Archbishops of Louisville ===
1. John A. Floersh (1937–1967)
2. Thomas Joseph McDonough (1967–1981)
3. Thomas Cajetan Kelly (1981–2007)
4. Joseph Edward Kurtz (2007–2022)
5. Shelton Fabre (2022–present)

=== Auxiliary bishop ===
Charles Garrett Maloney (1954–1988)

=== Other diocesan priests who became bishops ===
- John McGill, appointed Bishop of Richmond in 1850
- John Lancaster Spalding, appointed Bishop of Peoria in 1876
- Michael Heiss, appointed Bishop of La Crosse in 1868 and later Archbishop of Milwaukee
- James Ryan, appointed Bishop of Alton in 1888
- Theodore Henry Reverman, appointed Bishop of Superior in 1926
- Francis Ridgley Cotton, appointed Bishop of Owensboro in 1937
- James Kendrick Williams, appointed auxiliary bishop of Covington in 1984 and later Bishop of Lexington
- William Francis Medley, appointed Bishop of Owensboro in 2009
- Charles Coleman Thompson, appointed Bishop of Evansville in 2011 and later Archbishop of Indianapolis
- J. Mark Spalding, appointed Bishop of Nashville in 2017

== Notable figures ==
- Stephen T. Badin (1768–1853) – Known as the "circuit rider priest", Badin was the first priest ordained in the United States. He served what would become the Diocese of Bardstown.
- John L. Spalding (1840–1916) – Co-founder of Catholic University of America in Washington, D.C. He was called the "Catholic Emerson" because of his many books of essays. Spalding later became bishop of the Diocese of Peoria.
- Thomas Merton (1915–1968) – American Trappist monk of the Abbey of Gethsemani and author. He was known for his writings on Christian spirituality and his work on Buddhist-Christian relations.

== Coat of arms ==
Coat of arms of Archdiocese of Louisville
Notes The coat of arms was designed and adopted when Archdiocese was erected Adopted 1808 Escutcheon The coat of arms has a blue background with two wavy white lines, The background displays a fortress wall with three red arrowheads. Two fleur-de-lis and a white star are displayed about the wall. Symbolism The blue background symbolizes the Bluegrass region of the archdiocese. The wavy lines represent the waterfalls of the Ohio River. The wall symbolizes the old fort on Corn Island on the Ohio river. The arrowheads represent the French and Indian War of 1754 to 1763, which raged in the region. One fleur-de-lis represents the French King Louis XVI, the other represents the French missionaries in the region, including Bishop Flaget. The star represents Our Lady of the Assumption, patroness of the cathedral.

== Education ==
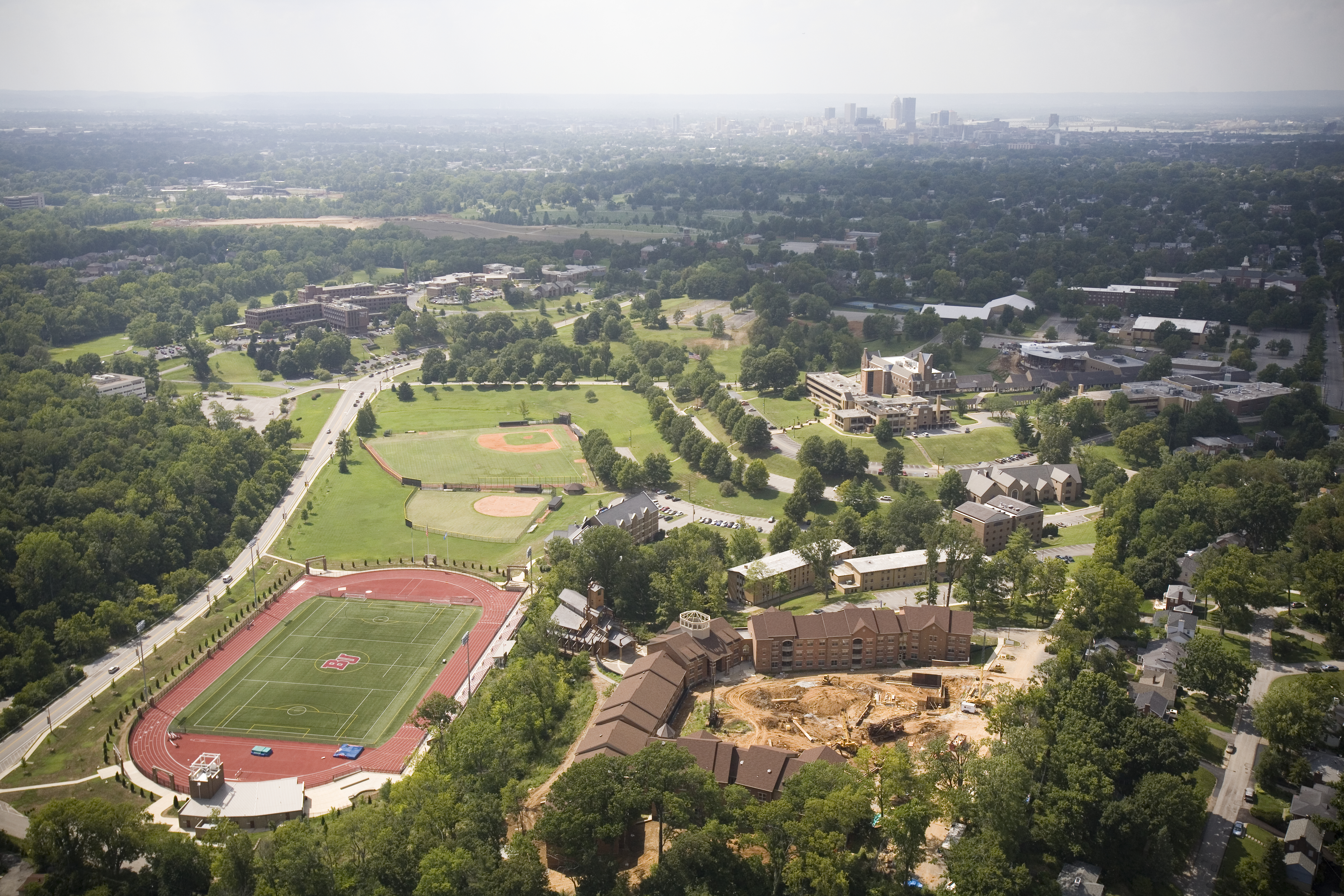
Bellarmine University, Louisville, Kentucky

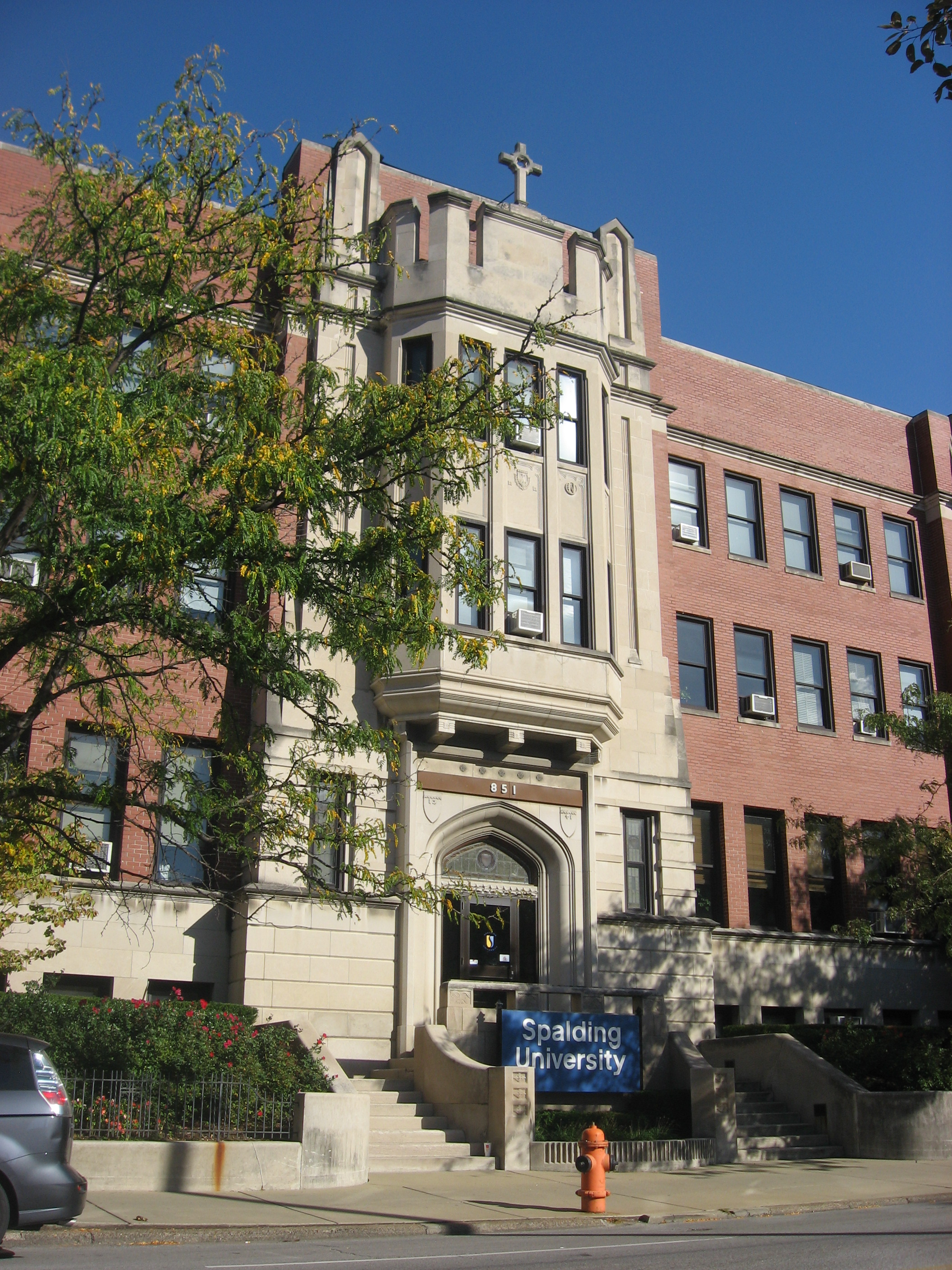
Spalding University, Louisville, Kentucky (2012)

=== High schools ===
As of 2023, the Archdiocese of Louisville has nine Catholic high schools and four kindergarten through 12th grade schools. The high schools serve over 5,000 students.

The archdiocese also recognizes three independent Catholic schools.

==== Boys ====
- DeSales High School – Louisville
- St. Xavier High School – Louisville
- Trinity High School – St. Matthews

==== Girls ====
- Assumption High School – Louisville
- Mercy Academy – Louisville
- Presentation Academy – Louisville
- Sacred Heart Academy – Louisville

==== Coeducational ====
- Bethlehem High School – Bardstown
- Holy Cross High School – Louisville

=== Elementary schools ===
As of 2023, the archdiocese had 36 Catholic elementary schools that served 12,800 students in six counties.

== Metropolitan Province of Louisville ==
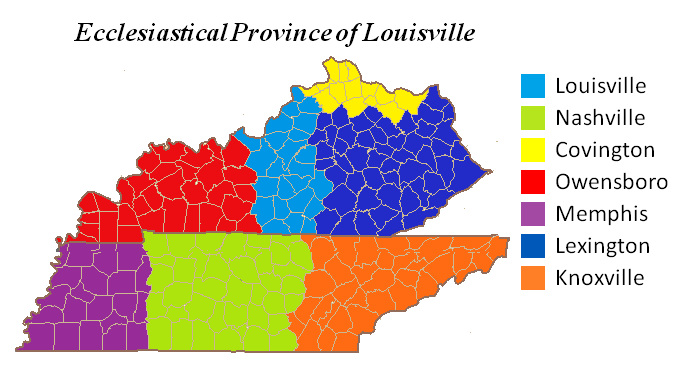
Ecclesiastical Province of Louisville

The Metropolitan Province of Louisville covers the states of Kentucky and Tennessee, and comprises the following dioceses:

- Archdiocese of Louisville
- Diocese of Covington
- Diocese of Knoxville
- Diocese of Lexington
- Diocese of Memphis
- Diocese of Nashville
- Diocese of Owensboro

== See also ==
- List of Catholic dioceses in the United States
- Religion in Louisville, Kentucky
