= St. Boniface's Catholic Church (Louisville, Kentucky) =

Historic church in Kentucky, United States

- St. Bonifacius Kirche Complex
- U.S. National Register of Historic Places
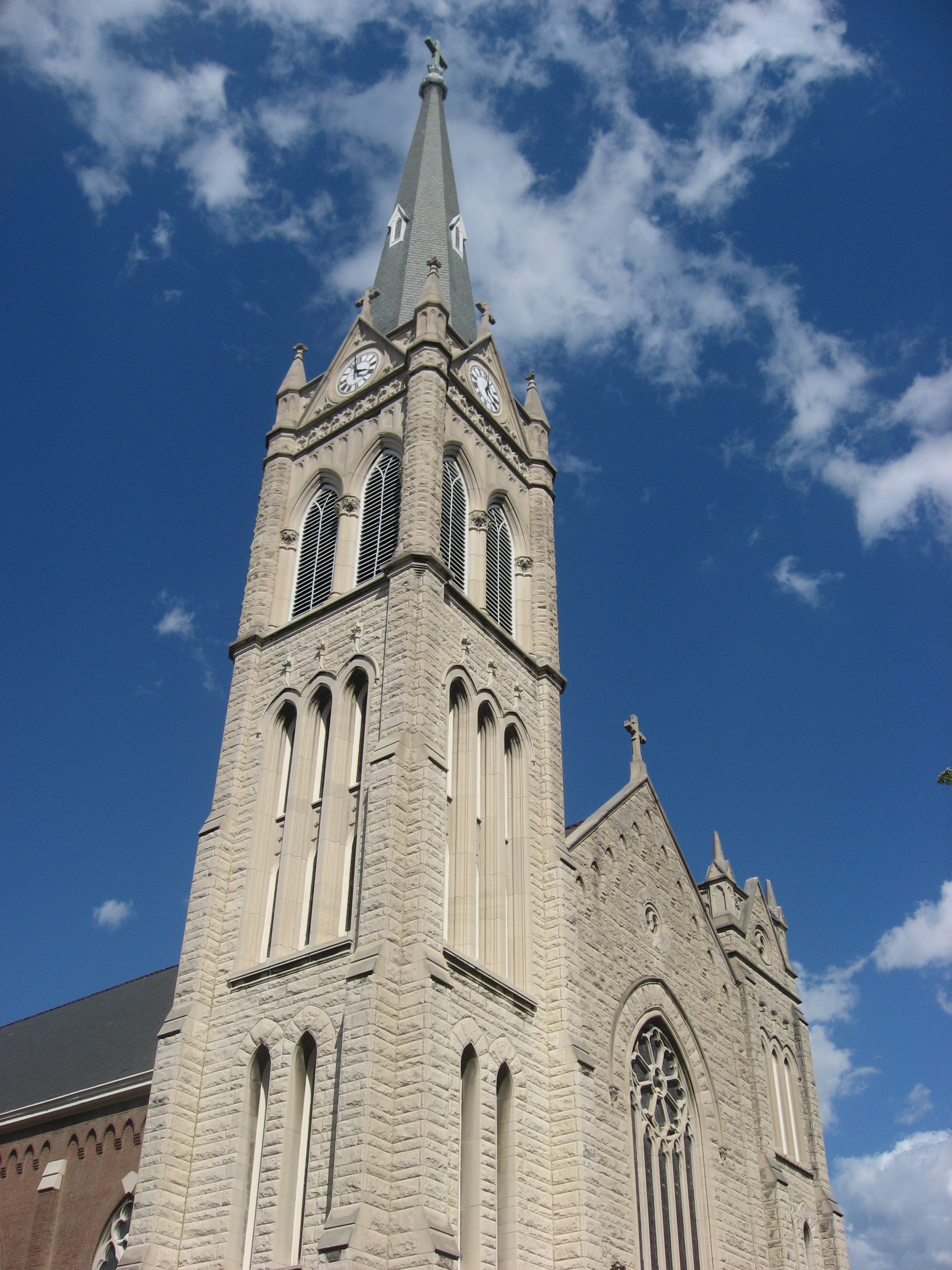
- Front and side of the church

- Location within Kentucky Location within the United States
- Location: 501-531 E. Liberty St., Louisville, Kentucky
- Coordinates: 38°15′5″N 85°44′38″W
- Area: 1.9 acres (0.77 ha)
- Built: 1899
- Architect: Murphy D. X. & Bros.
- Architectural style: Gothic Revival
- NRHP reference No.: 82001562
- Added to NRHP: October 29, 1982

St. Boniface Catholic Church (also known as St. Bonifacius Kirche Complex) is a historic church at 501-531 E. Liberty Street in Louisville, Kentucky.

Established in 1836, St. Boniface was the first German Catholic parish in the city. It is also the oldest, continuously existent, Catholic parish in the city of Louisville. The present structure was built in 1899 and added to the National Register in 1982 as St.Bonifacius Kirche Complex.

== History ==
Saint Boniface was named for the "Apostle of Germany". Diocesan clergy staffed Saint Boniface from its founding until 1849 when Bishop Martin John Spalding asked the Franciscan priests of Cincinnati, Ohio to take responsibility for the parish because of the high influx of German Catholic immigrants moving into the surrounding neighborhood, and the availability of German-speaking Franciscan priests. After 148 years, in 1998, the Archdiocese of Louisville resumed responsibility for the parish.

== Nativity Academy at St. Boniface ==
Founded in August 2003 by Fr. Tim Hogan, at that time pastor of St. Boniface parish, and administered by Sr. Paula Kleine-Kracht, OSU, Nativity Academy at St. Boniface was established as an independent private middle school in the Catholic tradition to educate urban youth. Along with the sponsorship of the Ursuline Sisters of Louisville, and the Xaverian Brothers, Nativity Academy teaches formal religion classes within the Catholic Faith. All students participate in ecumenical and Catholic prayer services, but are not required to be, or become Catholic.
