= John Baptist Mary David =

French-born Catholic prelate in the United States (1761–1841)

The Right Reverend John Baptist Mary David S.S.
- Bishop of Bardstown
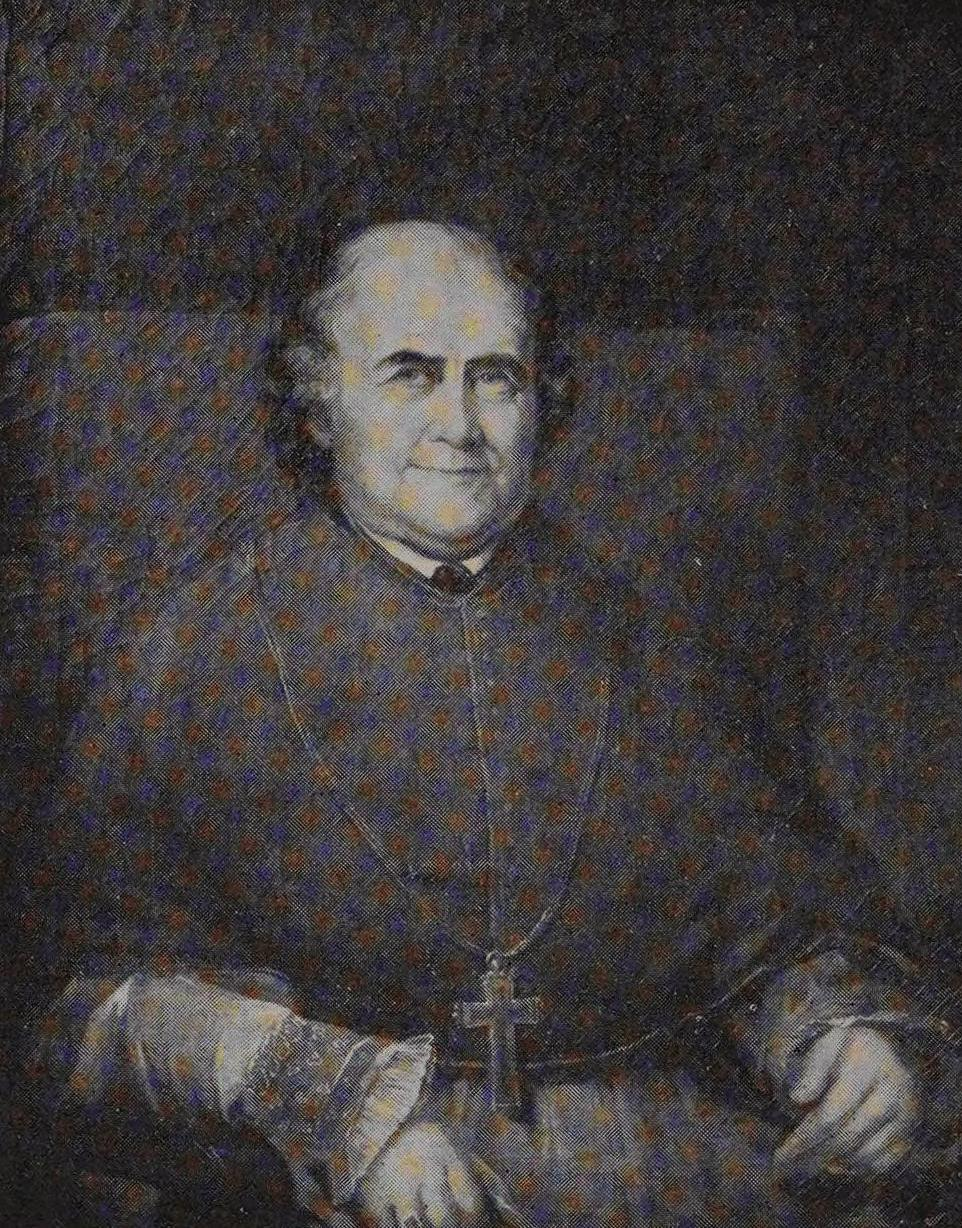
- Church: Roman Catholic Church
- See: Bardstown
- In office: August 25, 1832—March 17, 1833
- Predecessor: Benedict Joseph Flaget, S.S.
- Successor: Benedict Joseph Flaget, S.S.
- Previous post: Coadjutor Bishop of Bardstown (1819-1832)

Orders
- Ordination: September 24, 1785
- Consecration: August 15, 1819 by Benedict Joseph Flaget, S.S.

Personal details
- Born: June 4, 1761 Couëron, Province of Brittany, Kingdom of France
- Died: July 12, 1841 (aged 80) Nazareth, Kentucky, U.S.

John Baptist Mary David, S.S. (French: Jean-Baptiste-Marie David), (June 4, 1761 – July 12, 1841) was a French-born Catholic prelate who served as Bishop of Bardstown from 1832 to 1833. He was a member of the Sulpicians.

== Biography ==
David was born in Couëron, in the Province of Brittany (now the Department of Loire-Atlantique) in pre-revolutionary France. At age 7 he was placed under the care of his uncle, a priest, who instructed the boy in Latin, French, and music.

He entered the nearby college of the Oratorians at age 14, and later the seminary of the Diocese of Nantes, receiving the tonsure in 1778. Ordained a priest on September 24, 1785, he joined the Society of Saint-Sulpice (commonly known as the Sulpicians) and taught philosophy, theology, and Scripture at the Sulpician seminary in Angers from 1786 until 1790, when the French Revolution forced him to seek shelter in the private home of a Catholic family.

In January 1792, seeking safety, David was part of a small group of Sulpicians who left France for the United States, under the leadership of the Abbé Benedict Joseph Flaget, S.S., landing in Baltimore, Maryland in March. He was first sent by Bp. John Carroll to serve the Catholics of southern Maryland in Bryantown and missions in Charles County. While professor of philosophy at Georgetown College (1804–06), he continued to serve as a missionary to southern Maryland. He was the professor of theology at St. Mary's Seminary (1806–10) in Baltimore, where he was also acting president during 1810–11.

In 1810 he moved west to serve under his colleague, Flaget, now the bishop of the Diocese of Bardstown, Kentucky, where he established St. Thomas Seminary. In 1812 he founded the Sisters of Charity of Nazareth, whose Superior General he remained almost to the end of his life.

On July 4, 1817, David was appointed Coadjutor Bishop of Bardstown and Titular Bishop of Maurocastrum by Pope Pius VII. He received his episcopal consecration on August 15, 1819 (the two-year-long delay due to his reluctance to accept his nomination) from Bishop Flaget. Following his consecration, he continued to serve as a missionary, superior of St. Thomas' Seminary, and pastor of St. Joseph's Cathedral. David succeeded Flaget as the second Bishop of Bardstown on August 25, 1832. However, he resigned as Bishop less than a year later, on March 17, 1833. His poor health compelled him to retire to the motherhouse of the Sisters of Charity he had founded in Nazareth, where he later died at age 80 and was buried.

== Episcopal succession ==
Catholic Church titles
| Preceded by Benedict Joseph Flaget, S.S. | Bishop of Bardstown; 1832–1833 | Succeeded by Benedict Joseph Flaget, S.S. |
