= Le Vigean =

Commune in Auvergne-Rhône-Alpes, France

- Commune
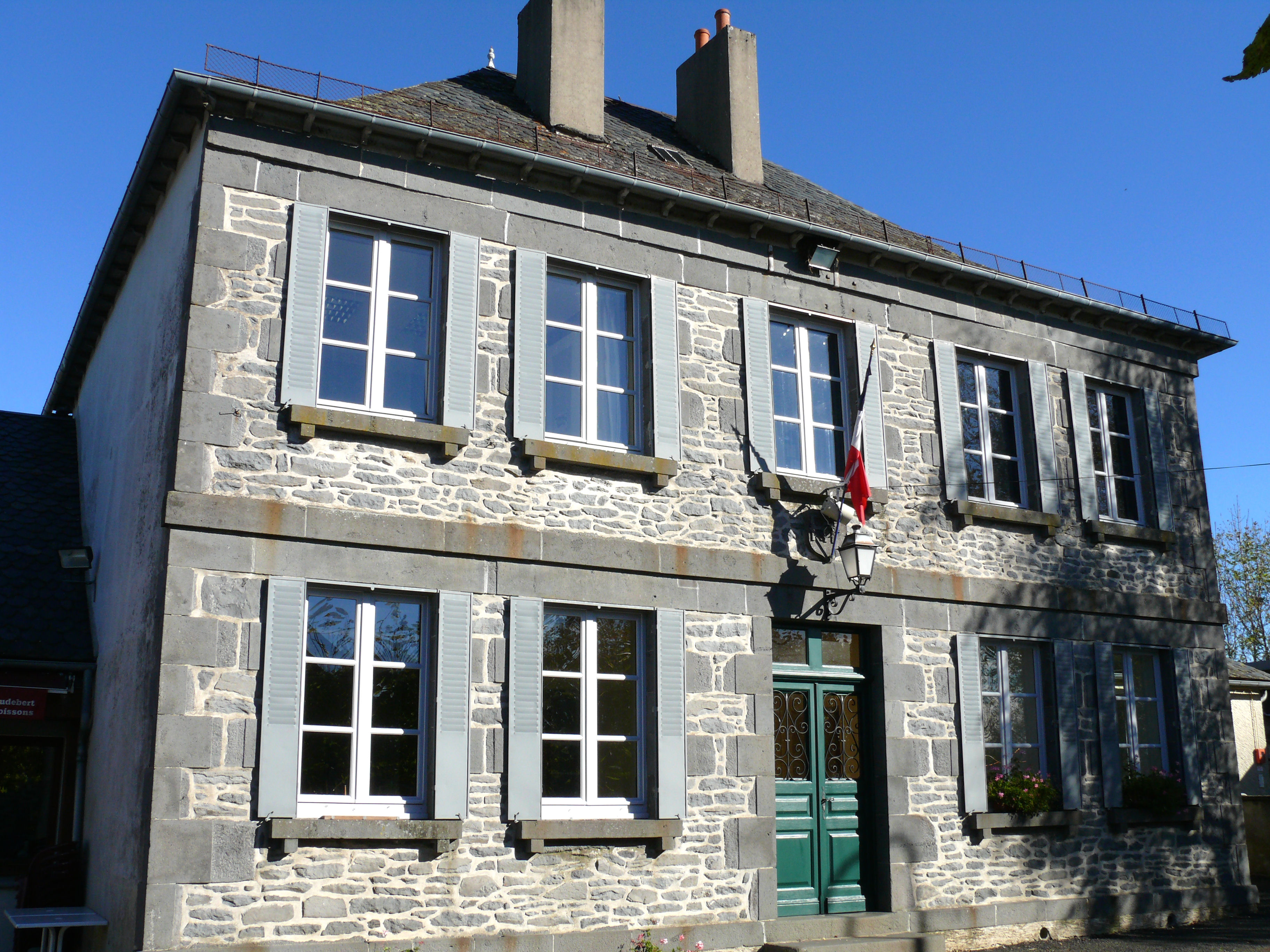
- Town hall
- Location of Le Vigean
- Location within France Location within Auvergne-Rhône-Alpes
- Coordinates: 45°13′38″N 2°21′13″E
- Country: France
- Region: Auvergne-Rhône-Alpes
- Department: Cantal
- Arrondissement: Mauriac
- Canton: Mauriac
- Intercommunality: Pays de Mauriac

Government
  - Mayor (2020–2026): Jean-Pierre Soulier
- Area^{1}: 28.99 km^{2} (11.19 sq mi)
- Elevation: 725 m (2,379 ft)
- Highest elevation: 789 m (2,589 ft)
- Lowest elevation: 462 m (1,516 ft)
- Population (2023): 787
  - Density: 27.1/km^{2} (70.3/sq mi)
- Time zone: UTC+01:00 (CET)
  - Summer (DST): UTC+02:00 (CEST)
- INSEE/Postal code: 15261 /15200
- ^{1} French Land Register data, which excludes lakes, ponds, glaciers > 1 km^{2} (0.386 sq mi or 247 acres) and river estuaries.

Le Vigean is a commune in the Cantal department in south-central France.

== Population ==
Historical population
Year	Pop.	±% p.a.
1968	1,041	—
1975	919	−1.76%
1982	856	−1.01%
1990	857	+0.01%
1999	879	+0.28%
2007	835	−0.64%
2012	841	+0.14%
2017	820	−0.50%
2023	787	−0.68%
Source: INSEE

== See also ==
- Communes of the Cantal department
