= Nazareth, Kentucky =

Unincorporated community in Nelson County, Kentucky

Coordinates: 37°50′53″N 85°28′22″W

Nazareth is an unincorporated community and a historic site in Nelson County, Kentucky, United States, located about three miles north of Bardstown. The zipcode is: 40048.

== History ==
In 1822, Nazareth became the new home of the Sisters of Charity of Nazareth, founded in 1812, whose motherhouse is still there. It was the location of their school, Nazareth Academy, later known as Nazareth College, which the Sisters operated there until 1971. The founder of the Sisters, the Right Reverend John Baptist David, S.S., died there in 1841 and is buried in the convent cemetery.

A post office operated briefly in Nazareth in 1863, which reopened in 1888 and is still in operation. The district was also a station on the Louisville and Bardstown Railroad, now the Louisville and Nashville Railroad.
