= Mount St. Mary's University (Maryland) =

Catholic university in Emmitsburg, Maryland, US

Coordinates: 39.682°N 77.353°W

- Former names: Mount Saint Mary's College and Seminary (1808–2004)
- Motto: Spes Nostra (Latin)
- Motto in English: Our Hope
- Type: Private university and seminary
- Established: June 6, 1808; 218 years ago
- Religious affiliation: Catholic
- Academic affiliations: ACCU; NAICU; CIC
- President: Gerard J. Joyce
- Students: 2,411 (fall 2024)
- Undergraduates: 1,833 (2024)
- Postgraduates: 578 (2024)
- Location: Emmitsburg, Maryland, U.S.
- Colors: Blue, White, and Bronze
- Nickname: Mountaineers
- Sporting affiliations: NCAA Division I – MAAC; ECAC; CWPA
- Mascot: Emmit S. Burg
- Website: www.msmary.edu

Mount St. Mary's University is a private Catholic university in unincorporated Frederick County, Maryland, in proximity to Emmitsburg. It has the largest Catholic seminary in the United States. Undergraduate programs are divided between the College of Liberal Arts, the Richard J. Bolte School of Business, and the School of Natural Science and Mathematics. "The Mount" has over 40 undergraduate majors, minors, concentrations, and special programs, as well as bachelor's/master's combinations in partnership with other universities, 8 master's programs, and 6 postgraduate certificate programs.

== History ==
=== Origins ===
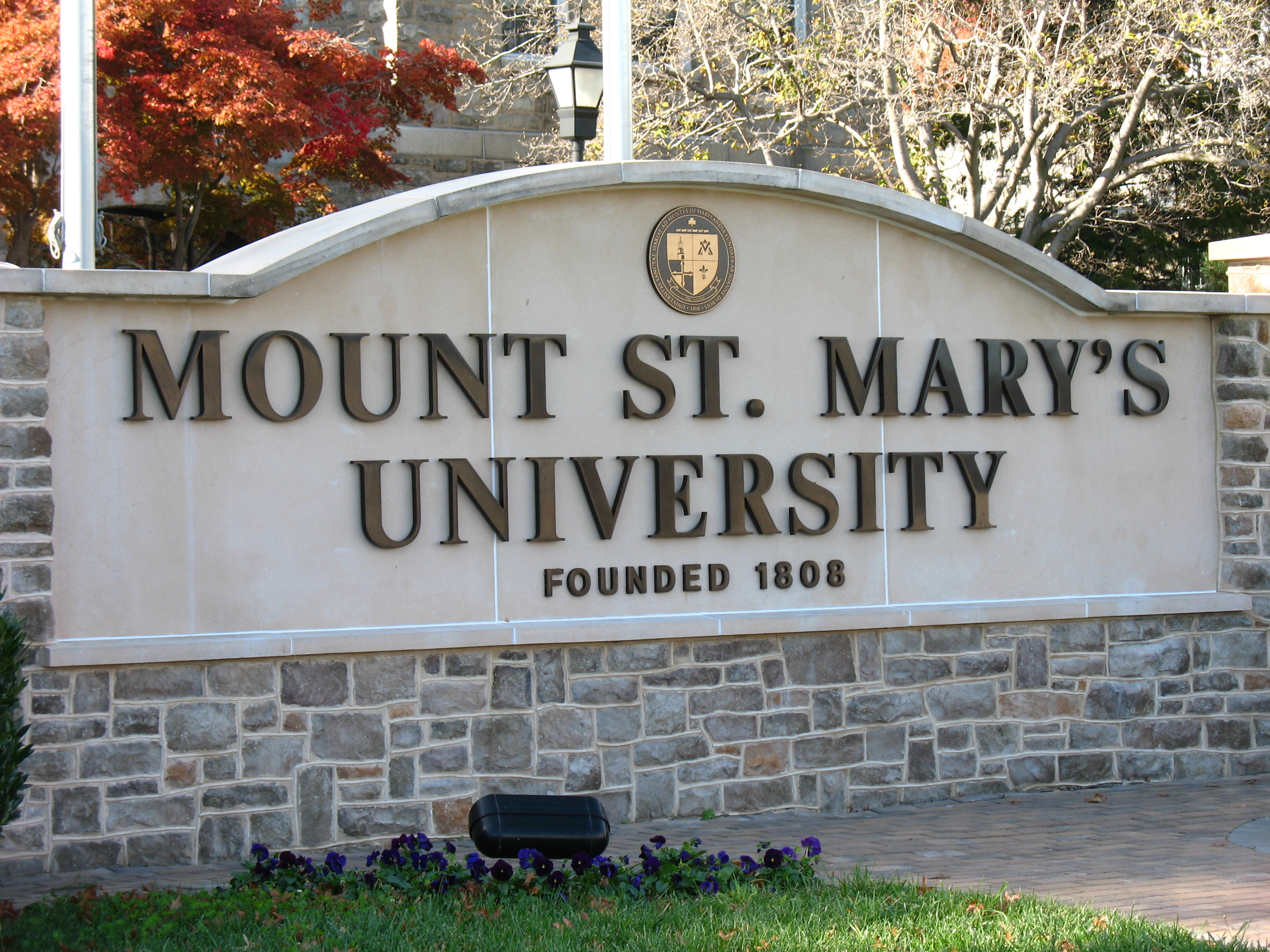
The entrance sign to Mount St. Mary's University

Mount Saint Mary's was founded by French émigré John DuBois, a French-born Catholic prelate who served as Bishop of New York from 1826 until his death in 1842. In 1805, DuBois bought land near Emmitsburg, Maryland on the mountain that Catholic colonists had christened "St. Mary's Mountain," and laid the cornerstone for Saint-Mary's-on-the-Hill church. Parishioners from two local congregations built a one-story, two room log cabin for DuBois, and that cabin was the first structure of Mount Saint Mary's. The church was completed in 1807. DuBois first opened a boarding school for children. Then, in 1808, the Society of St. Sulpice closed Pigeon Hill, its preparatory seminary in Pennsylvania, and transferred all the seminarians to Emmitsburg. This marked the official beginning of Mount St. Mary's. DuBois was appointed president of the college. Simon Bruté, whom President John Quincy Adams called "the most learned man of his day in America", joined Mount St. Mary's as teacher and vice-president in 1812. The small faculty of Mount St. Mary's strove to offer a full high school and college course to lay students and potential priests and developed Mount St. Mary's into "one of the most important ecclesiastical institutions of the country". DuBois Hall, named for DuBois, was completed in 1826 in what had been a swampy thicket on the mountain. The first charter for a university was obtained in 1830. Until the early 1900s, Mount St. Mary's also acted as a boarding school. Some remnants of the boarding school, such as Bradley Hall (one of the oldest buildings on campus), still exist. The Mount was known as Mount Saint Mary's College and Seminary until June 7, 2004, when the name was changed to Mount Saint Mary's University.

=== Saint Joseph College history and merger with Mount Saint Mary's ===
Elizabeth Ann Seton, founder of the Sisters of Charity and the first native born United States citizen to be canonized as a saint, came to Emmitsburg in 1809. She lived on the campus of Mount St. Mary's while her own school was being built. For a while, she lived in the same log cabin that had been built for DuBois. In June 1809, Seton established Saint Joseph's Academy and Free School for girls, the first free Catholic parochial school in the United States. This school is considered to be the foundation of the entire Catholic parochial school system in the United States. Seton wrote classroom textbooks and trained her Catholic sisters to become teachers, and accepted all students regardless of ability to pay. Saint Joseph's Academy and Free School developed into Saint Joseph College High School (1890–1946), Saint Joseph's High School (1946–1982), and Saint Joseph College (1902–1973), a four-year liberal arts college for women.

There was a long shared history between Saint Joseph and Mount St. Mary's. In 1815, Seton sent several of the Sisters of Charity to manage the Infirmary at Mount St. Mary's. As enrollment at Saint Joseph's Academy grew in the 1800s, some professors from Mount St. Mary's were added to the Saint Joseph's faculty, and, since the campuses of the all-female Saint Joseph College and the all-male Mount St. Mary's were just a couple of miles apart, the schools historically depended on each other for social life. In 1967, female students at Saint Joseph College began taking some classes at Mount St. Mary's, and men from Mount St. Mary's began taking some classes at Saint Joseph. In 1973, with declining enrollment numbers and rising operating costs, Saint Joseph College closed its doors and merged with Mount St. Mary's, which has been fully co-educational since then.

=== World War II ===
During World War II, Mount Saint Mary's College was one of 131 colleges and universities nationally that took part in the V-12 Navy College Training Program which offered students a path to a Navy commission.

=== 2016 "Drown the bunnies" controversy ===
In January 2016, The Washington Post reported on plans by university president Simon P. Newman to use a questionnaire administered to freshman students to dismiss 20 to 25 freshmen in the first weeks of school to improve the school's retention statistics. The questionnaire included questions about students' mental health, disabilities, and financial support. The story originally appeared in the university's student newspaper, The Mountain Echo. Newman was quoted as saying, in response to criticism and questions from colleagues, "you think of the students as cuddly bunnies, but you can't. You just have to drown the bunnies ... put a Glock to their heads." Two professors who objected to the president's policies were abruptly terminated without severance. One, Ed Egan, was the faculty adviser of The Mountain Echo, while the other, Thane Naberhaus, was a tenured professor who had publicly questioned the president's actions. The two were told they were fired because they had violated "a duty of loyalty" to the university. University provost David Rehm also objected to the president's plan and was asked to resign as provost but allowed to keep his faculty position. Professors throughout America protested the terminations and denounced them as retribution. Over 8,000 scholars digitally signed a petition for them to be reinstated, while organizations such as the American Association of University Professors, Student Press Law Center, and Foundation for Individual Rights in Education issued statements condemning Newman's actions. On February 12, 2016, the Mount St. Mary's faculty issued a resolution asking Newman to resign; on that same day, Newman announced at a faculty meeting that the two fired professors would be reinstated. On February 29, 2016, the university announced Newman's resignation. In a statement, Newman said that he cared deeply about the university, and that the recent publicity regarding his leadership became "too great of a distraction to our mission of educating students."

== Connection to Notre Dame and Saint Mary's College in Indiana ==
French missionary Simon Bruté spent two decades as teacher and pastor in the formative years of Mount St. Mary's. He was considered "one of the foremost scholars in America," and he had a great deal of influence on the Catholic Church in America. In 1834, he was appointed the founding bishop of the Diocese of Vincennes, Indiana. In 1832, Stephen Badin of Indiana purchased 524 acres (212 ha) of land surrounding two lakes near South Bend, Indiana, and when he retired in 1835 he deeded the property to the Diocese of Vincennes. It was Badin's dream that a school would be established there.

Bruté visited the South Bend property and described it as "a most desirable spot, and one soon I hope to be occupied by some prosperous institution." In 1836, Bruté traveled to France seeking funds and priests for his diocese, and one of the priests he recruited was Edward Sorin, the founder of Notre Dame. After Bruté's death in 1839, his successor, Bishop Hailandière, offered the 524-acre (212 ha) South Bend property to Sorin for the purpose of starting a college. The school was founded in 1842 as "L'Université de Notre Dame du Lac" (The University of Our Lady of the Lake). and grew to become the University of Notre Dame and its sister school Saint Mary's College.

Mount St. Mary's, Notre Dame, and Saint Mary's College are each named in honor of the Blessed Virgin Mary, with Notre Dame meaning "Our Lady," a term of endearment for Mary. And each school's motto focuses on Mary's attribute of Catholic hope. Mount St. Mary's: 'Spes Nostra' (Our Hope), Notre Dame: 'Vita Dulcedo Spes' (Life, Sweetness, Hope) and Saint Mary's College in Indiana: 'Spes Unica' (The Only/Unique Hope)

== Campuses ==
=== Main campus ===
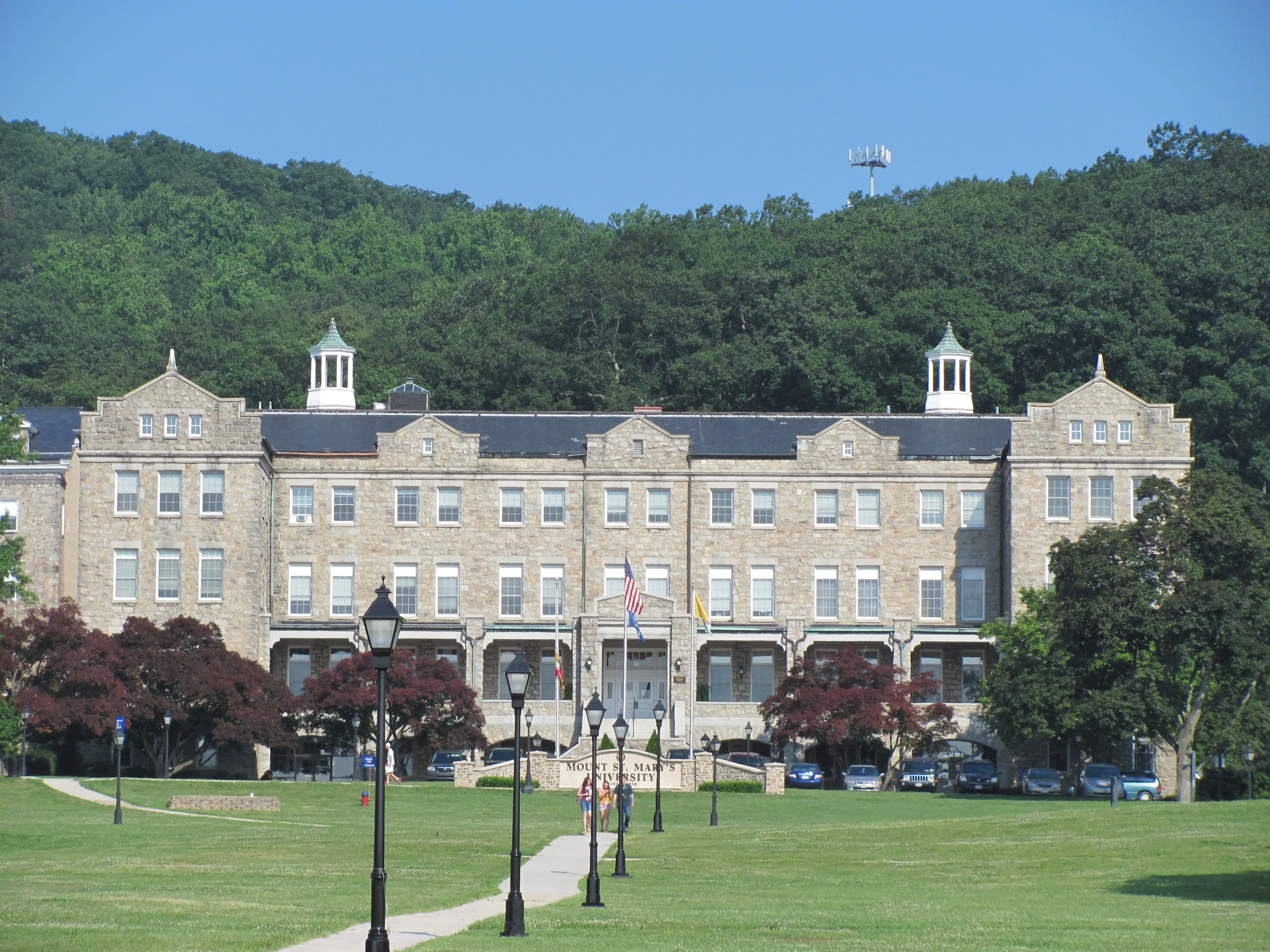
Bradley Hall is the main Administration building

Mount St. Mary's University is located on a 1,400-acre campus in a rural mountain setting. Students live in five new or renovated residence halls. There are also three apartment buildings where seniors (and some juniors) live in fully furnished apartments complete with bathrooms and kitchens. The student center and cafeteria are located in the recently renovated McGowan center.

Academic classes are held in the Knott Academic Center, the COAD Science Building, and the Borders Learning Center. The fine arts department is located in the newly renovated Flynn Hall, now known as the Delaplaine Fine Arts Center.

Bradley Hall is the campus administration building.

The ARCC, called "The Ark", is a sports and fitness complex available to students. It contains the Knott Arena, which can seat up to 5,000 people and is used for athletic events, special events and concerts on campus. On October 4, 2015, President Barack Obama spoke at the National Fallen Firefighters Memorial Service at the Knott Arena.

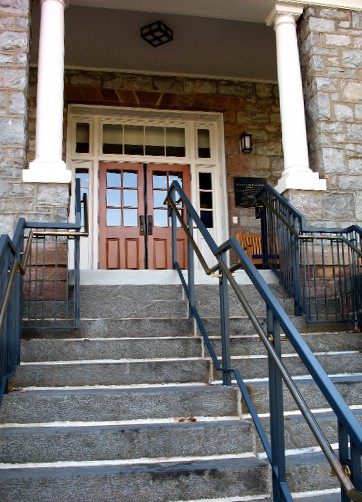
Entrance to the Delaplaine Fine Arts Center

==== National Shrine Grotto of Our Lady of Lourdes ====
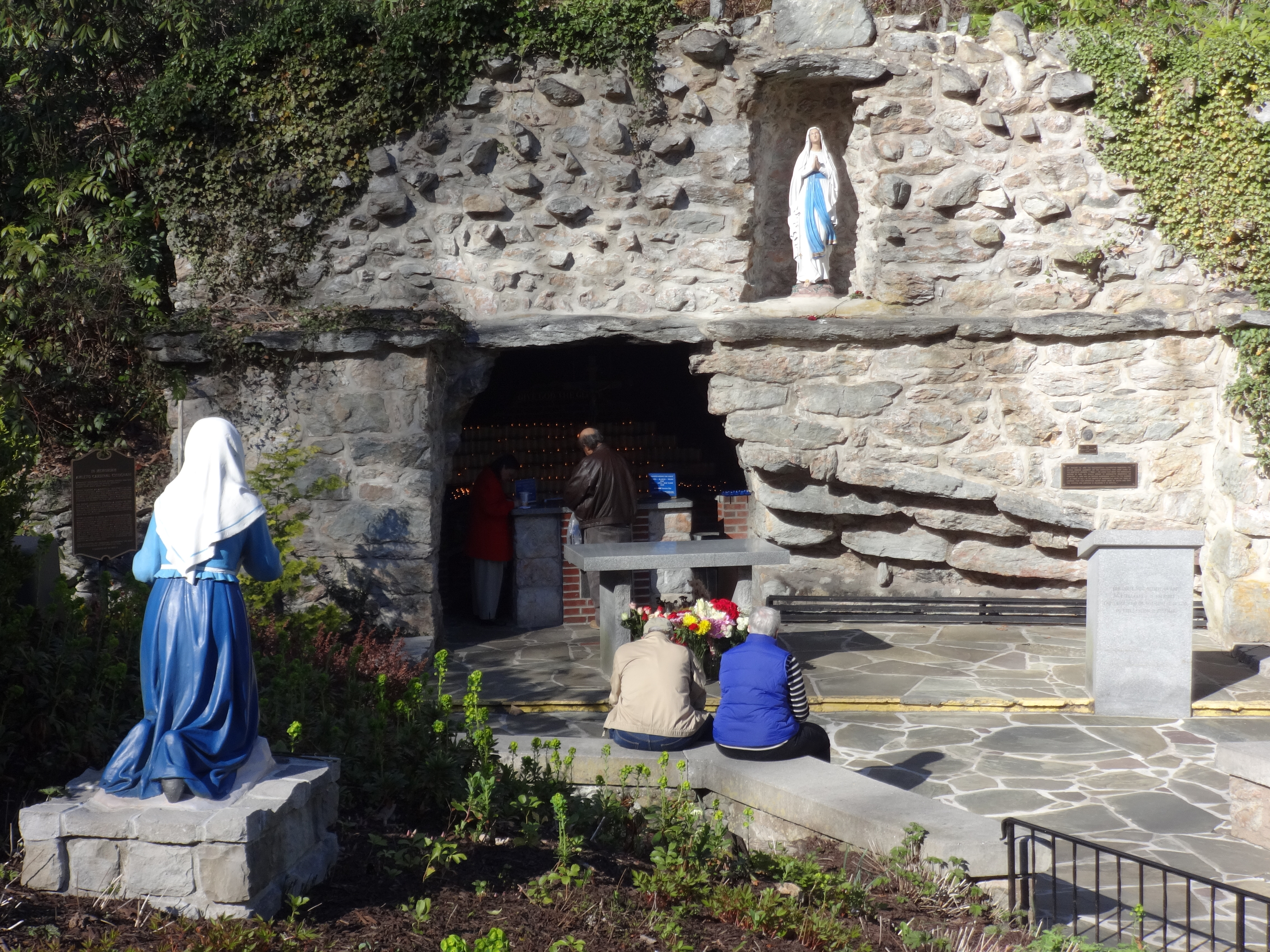
Grotto cave at National Shrine Grotto of Our Lady of Lourdes, April 2016

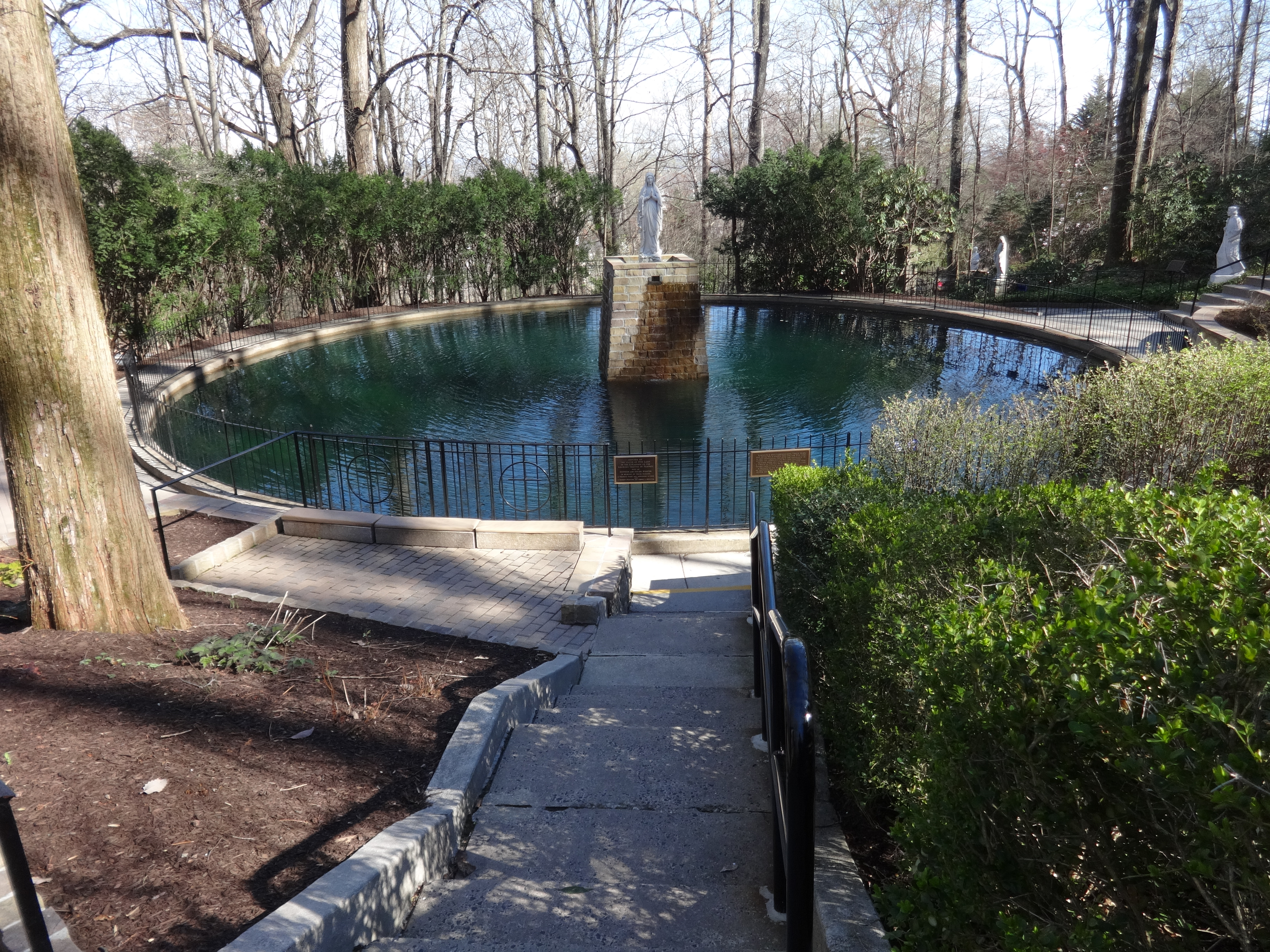
Fountain pool at National Shrine Grotto of Our Lady of Lourdes, April 2016

Mount St. Mary's is home to the National Shrine Grotto of Our Lady of Lourdes, a Catholic pilgrimage site devoted to the Blessed Virgin Mary that draws thousands of visitors annually. Emmitsburg.net describes the grotto as "a place of pastoral beauty and spiritual inspiration ... situated high on the mountainside where nature displays itself in all its wild and picturesque glory." The sixty acres of grounds include lush gardens, a pond, rosary paths, the Stations of the Cross, devotional areas, a scenic overlook, and St. Mary's Chapel on the Hill (also known as the Glass Chapel). Grotto water flows from taps located around a fountain pool, and chaplains are available to bless the water for visitors. John Watterson had the stone grotto cave built in 1875 as a replica of the miraculous Our Lady of Lourdes in France.

The grotto was first established on St. Mary's Mountain in 1805 by the university's founder, John Dubois. According to legend, DuBois was attracted to a light on the mountain and found a blessed spot and sat down at the foot of a large oak tree beside a stream. He made a cross of twigs and fixed it to the tree to be the symbol of the holy work he was undertaking. This was the original grotto. Simon Bruté was an early steward of the grotto. He created pathways throughout the grounds and attached crosses to the trees that now line the Stations of the Cross along the entrance. Saint Elizabeth Ann Seton attended Sunday Mass at the Grotto chapel. The 1911 book The Story of the Mountain tells how Mother Seton would sit on her favorite rock at the Grotto and "invoke the divine blessing by reciting the Canticle of the Three Children, and none that heard her could ever forget the tones of that voice and the fervor of that heart, which in the midst of the wild scenery of nature called upon all creatures to bless and magnify their Creator." Her rosary walks around the grotto were re-enacted in 2005 to celebrate its 200th anniversary.

In 1958, the grotto was refurbished and made more accessible to the public by Hugh J. Phillips, who became known as the "Restorer of the Grotto." The grotto was proclaimed a Public Oratory on December 8, 1965, by Cardinal Lawrence Shehan, archbishop of Baltimore. On November 27, 2007, Bishop Jacques Perrier of the Diocese of Tarbes-et-Lourdes in France visited the Mount St. Mary's Grotto and gave the gift of a stone excavated from the original grotto in Lourdes, France, in order to "spiritually connect" the two places.

=== Frederick campus ===
The Frederick campus is a satellite campus of The Mount that is located in Frederick, Maryland, about 20 miles (32 km) south of the main Emmitsburg campus. All classes are held in the evening to accommodate working adults. Students can study in master's degree and graduate certificate programs. There are four undergraduate degree programs that are designed specifically for working adults: B.S. in business, B.A. in criminal justice, B.S. in elementary education, and B.S. in human services. Most courses are offered in five or eight-week sessions, instead of traditional 15-week semesters. Classes meet once each week, from 6 to 9:30 p.m. Sessions run on a year-around schedule.

== Academics ==
=== Undergraduate admissions ===
In 2024, the university accepted 79.6% of undergraduate applicants, with those admitted having an average 3.36 GPA. Mount St. Mary's University does not require submission of standardized test scores. The university is a test optional school and those submitting test scores had an average 1040–1250 SAT score (22% submitting scores) or average 19–25 ACT score (2% submitting scores).

=== Rankings ===
In 2024, Mount St. Mary's University was ranked tied for #69 out of 178 Regional Universities North by U.S. News & World Report. The Mount was also ranked #24 in Best Value Schools and #48 in Best Colleges for Veterans.

== Seminary ==
Mount Saint Mary's Seminary enrolls on average over 150 full-time residential seminarians each year. They represent more than 25 dioceses from the U.S., as well as overseas. Students must be sponsored by a diocese or religious order before applying to study at the seminary. Some seminarians are co-sponsored by the Archdiocese for the Military Services. It is the second oldest Catholic seminary in the United States (after St. Mary's in Baltimore). The Catholic Review writes that the seminary has "a solid tradition of excellence in the formation of candidates for the Catholic priesthood." The seminary is well known for its more traditional theology, discipline and secluded rural setting.

The seminary has produced over 2600 priests and has been referred to as the "Cradle of Bishops" because 51 of its graduates have shepherded dioceses. John Hughes, an early graduate of the seminary, was the first Archbishop of the Archdiocese of New York. Class of 1826 graduate John McCloskey became the first American cardinal in 1875.

The seminary online blog On Mary's Mountain describes the daily life of the seminary community. Seminarians also write the Seminary Newsletter.

== Students and faculty ==
In 2014–15 the university enrolled 1,741 undergraduate students and 499 graduate students, with a total of 2,240 students.

The student population is about 55% female and 45% male.

Of the 1,689 undergraduate students, 55% are from Maryland and 33% are from other Mid-Atlantic States. 33 total states are represented, as well as 13 foreign countries.

Around 85% of undergraduates live on campus.

The student-faculty ratio is 13:1, and 46 percent of classes have fewer than twenty students. The most popular majors at Mount St. Mary's include: Business/Commerce, Criminology, Biological Sciences, Elementary/Secondary Education, and Accounting. The average freshman retention rate, an indicator of student satisfaction, is 80%.

For students who want to graduate early, the university offers a three-year degree option.

== Student publications ==
=== The Mountain Echo ===
The Mountain Echo is a print and online newspaper that reports on news and events at the university.

The newspaper began in 1879. According to a 1993 article by William Lawbaugh in The Mountain Briefing, the first issues were printed on a hand-operated press by Professor Ernest Lagarde from his home. Early issues of the newspaper were four pages long and reported on education, sports, and significant campus events. The issues also included articles on the history of Mount St. Mary's, poetry and literary works, death notices, alumni news, and personal and other advertisements. The Mountain Echo ceased publication after several years, but was revived on October 28, 1923, when Volume I, Number 1 was published. The Echo has been in continuous publication since then. The Mountain Echo was restructured during the academic year 1974–75, and was renamed The Mountain Review. The name was changed back to The Mountain Echo the following year. By the 1995/96 academic year, The Mountain Echo was printing a 24-page issue on a biweekly schedule. That year the newspaper expanded into two other formats. Echo Online was the first incarnation of The Mountain Echo website. And Echo Weekly News with Vince Chesney was a radio show hosted by the newspaper's editor-in-chief on the college radio station, WMTB.

=== Tolle Lege ===
Tolle Lege, first published in 2007, is a collection of philosophy and theology essays by undergraduates and seminarians. Essays are submitted through email and then voted on by the board of student editors. The journal's name means "take up and read," and is taken from Augustine's Confessions.

=== Lighted Corners ===
Lighted Corners, the Mount's literary and arts magazine, published its first issue in 1981. Lighted Corners is dedicated to art, fiction, creative nonfiction, poetry, and photography. Each year near the end of the fall semester, submissions are collected through email, which are voted on anonymously by staff. The editorial board makes the final selections, and then the staff spends the spring semester editing and putting the magazine together. Lighted Corners has won many awards from the Columbia Scholastic Press Association (CSPA), the American Scholastic Press Association, and the Society for Collegiate Journalists. In 2017, Lighted Corners received a gold medal and All-Columbian honors from the Columbia Scholastic Press Association. According to the CSPA, “All-Columbian honors have been given only when the publication has achieved the 95th percentile or higher in one or more of the three categories.”

=== Moorings ===
Moorings, the Mount's undergraduate critical humanities journal, published its first issue in 2016. Moorings accepts essay submissions primarily in History, English, Communications, Art, Music, and Theater. The journal attempts to maintain a balance in subjects while remaining dedicated to a high quality of academic work. Moorings also accepts student art submissions for cover artwork and provides a monetary prize for best essays and artwork. Although Moorings has an interdisciplinary panel of faculty advisors, the journal is almost entirely student-run with its editor-in-chief position passed down among students, making it unique among the Mount's journals. It also offers a double-blind peer review processes which both grades and edits written submissions.

== Athletics ==
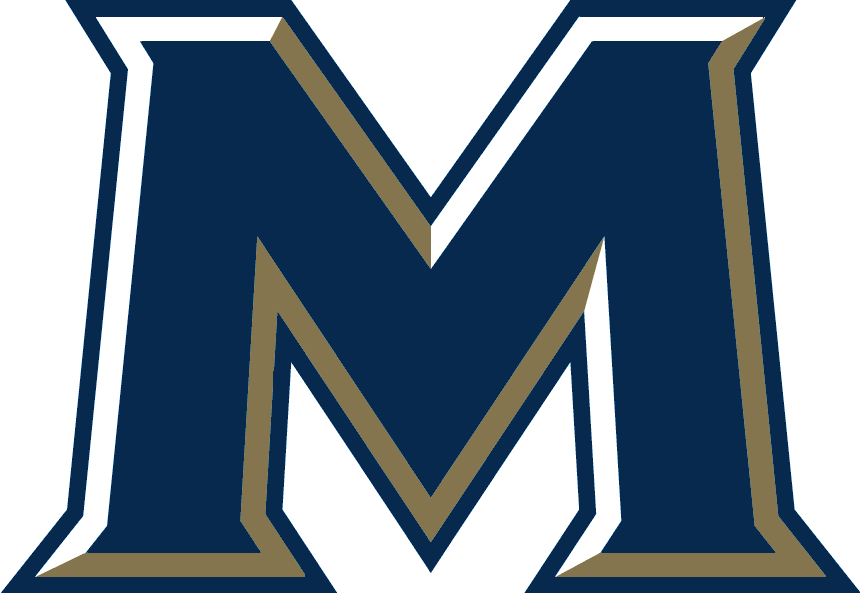
Mount St. Mary's Mountaineers alternate logo

Mount St. Mary's athletic teams compete as "the Mountaineers" at the Division I level of the National Collegiate Athletic Association (NCAA). The Mount has been a member of the Metro Atlantic Athletic Conference (MAAC) since 2022–23, having previously held membership in the Northeast Conference (NEC) from 1989–90 to 2021–22, and the Mason–Dixon Conference, at the NCAA Division II level, from 1940–41 to 1977–78 and from 1983–84 to 1987–88.

The Mount competes in 22 intercollegiate sports: Men's sports include baseball, basketball, cross country, golf, lacrosse, soccer, swimming & diving, tennis, track & field and water polo; while women's sports include basketball, bowling, cross country, golf, lacrosse, rugby, soccer, softball, swimming & diving, tennis, track & field and water polo.

== Notable people ==
=== Staff ===
- Simon Bruté, one of the earliest faculty members at the Mount as of 1812 and supporter to Dubois. Bruté taught both high school to local boys and college level courses to seminarians.
- Jim Phelan, basketball head coach until 2003. Phelan had 830 career wins (currently 18th on the all-time list), and coached a college basketball record 49 seasons at the same school. At the time of his retirement, Phelan had coached more NCAA games than any other coach in collegiate history. He was inducted into the National Collegiate Basketball Hall of Fame in 2008.

=== Alumni ===
- John Baer, journalist
- Geno Baroni, civil rights and anti-poverty activist
- Agnus Berenato (1980), head women's basketball coach at the University of Pittsburgh
- Rory Bourke (1964), songwriter, co-wrote the No. 1 hit song "The Most Beautiful Girl"; inducted into the Nashville Songwriters Hall of Fame in 1989
- Todd Bowles (2022), former American football player and current Tampa Bay Buccaneers head coach
- Charles C. Byrne, U.S. Army general
- Fred Carter, professional basketball player, 1969–1976; his Mount St. Mary's jersey number "33" was retired in 2007
- Jamion Christian, former Mount St. Mary's Head Basketball Coach
- Joe Engel, major league baseball pitcher 1912–20 (mainly for the Washington Senators)
- Edward J. Flanagan, founder of Boys Town in 1921; portrayed by Spencer Tracy in the 1938 film Boys Town
- William J. Frank, member of Maryland House of Delegates
- Francis Xavier Gartland, (January 13, 1805 – September 20, 1854) first Bishop of Savannah, Georgia (1850–1854)
- Kielce Gussie, journalist
- Chase Hilgenbrinck, former professional soccer player for the New England Revolution; priest and vocation director for Recruitment of the Diocese of Peoria
- Harry Hughes, Governor of Maryland, 1979–87
- John Hughes, the first Archbishop of the Archdiocese of New York, 1842–64
- John LaFarge, artist
- Joe Lamas, American professional football player with the Pittsburgh Steelers
- Richard A. La Vay (1975) former Maryland State Delegate
- William E. Lori, Archbishop of the Archdiocese of Baltimore
- Francisco I. Madero, democratic president of Mexico from 1911 to 1913; boarding school graduate
- Michael McCafferty, author and entrepreneur
- John McCloskey, first American Cardinal, archbishop of New York 1864–1885, first president of Fordham University 1841–43; university and seminary graduate
- Matthew F. McHugh, former U.S. Congressman
- Elijah Mitrou-Long (born 1996), Canadian-Greek basketball player for Hapoel Holon of the Israeli Basketball Premier League
- Susan O'Malley, first female president of an NBA franchise, the Washington Wizards
- Paul Palmieri, founder of Millennial Media
- John Baptist Purcell, Archbishop of Cincinnati
- James William Reilly, Ohio state representative and American Civil War general in the Union Army
- Kevin C. Rhoades, Bishop of Fort Wayne-South Bend
- Peter Rono, gold-medal winner of the 1,500 metres event at the 1988 Summer Olympics; university graduate
- Stanley Rother (1963), priest and martyr; seminary graduate
- Harry A. Slattery, U.S. Under Secretary of the Interior, 1938–39; author of the Slattery Report
- John F. Sullivan, basketball (1953–57), later played in American Basketball League
- Richard Vincent Whelan, Bishop of Richmond, Virginia (1841–1850) and Bishop of Wheeling, West Virginia (1850–1874).
- Edward Douglass White, Chief Justice of the United States Supreme Court, 1910–21
- Hugo Winterhalter (1931), musical composer, arranger, musician, and orchestra leader – MSM Choir and Chorus (1928–1931)
- Michael William Fisher (1958), Bishop of Buffalo
- Heath Tarbert, 14th Chairman of the Commodity Futures Trading Commission (CFTC)

== See also ==
- WMTB Radio – located on the campus of Mount St. Mary's
- National Catholic Educational Association
