= Simon Bruté =

French Catholic missionary (1779–1839)

Servant of God Simon Bruté
- Bishop of Vincennes (now Indianapolis)
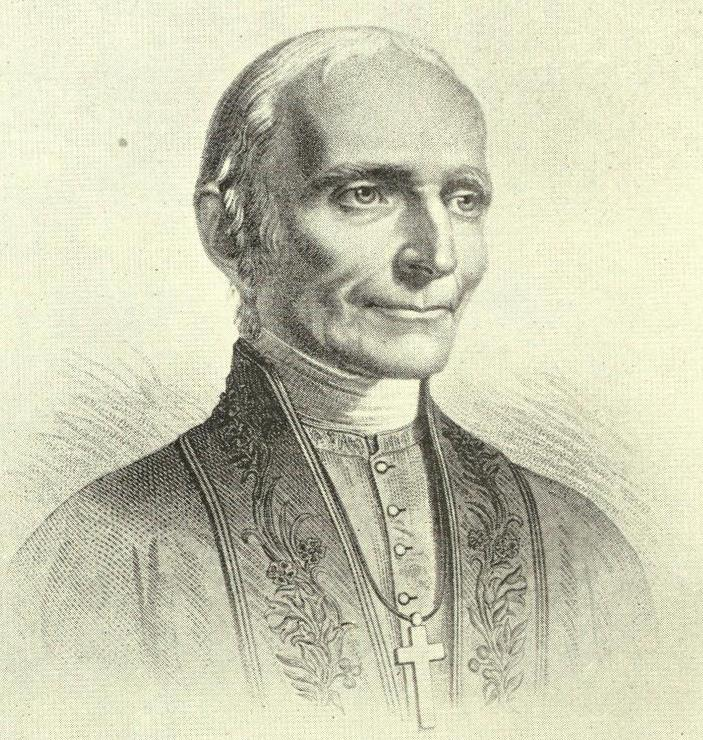
- Simon William Gabriel Brute from Who-When-What Book, 1900
- Church: Roman Catholic Church
- Archdiocese: Vincennes
- See: Vincennes
- Appointed: 6 May 1834
- Installed: 29 October 1834
- Term ended: 26 June 1839

Orders
- Ordination: 11 June 1808
- Consecration: 28 October 1834 by Benedict Joseph Flaget
- Rank: Bishop

Personal details
- Born: Simon William Gabriel Bruté de Rémur; March 20, 1779 Rennes, Ille-et-Vilaine, France
- Died: June 26, 1839 (aged 60) Vincennes, Indiana, United States
- Denomination: Roman Catholic
- Education: Seminary of Saint Sulpice in Paris

Simon William Gabriel Bruté de Rémur (March 20, 1779 – June 26, 1839) was a French Catholic missionary to the United States who served as the first Bishop of Vincennes from 1834 until his death in 1839. President John Quincy Adams called Bruté "the most learned man of his day in America."

== Early life and education in France ==
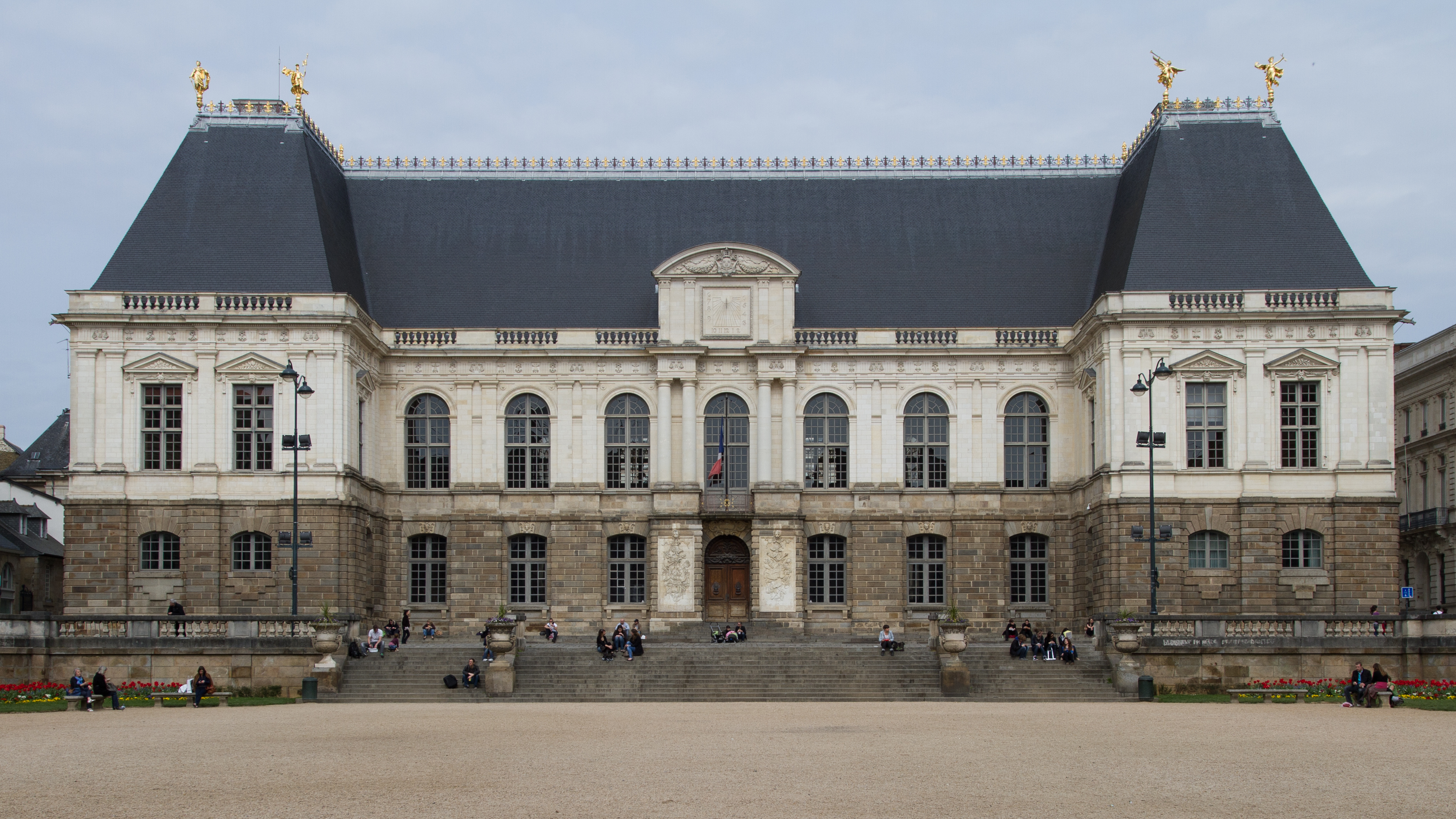
The Palace of Justice in Rennes, birthplace of Simon Bruté

Bruté's father, Gabriel Bruté de Rémur, belonged to an ancient and wealthy family. He was married twice. His first wife was Mary Jeanne Le Chat de La Sourdière (1730–1776), by whom he had seven children between 1757 and 1772. After her death, he remarried on February 14, 1778, in Rennes, Brittany, to Renée Le Saulnier du Vauhello, a native of Saint-Brieuc and the widow of Francis Vatar (1721–1771), printer to the King and Parliament at Rennes. Two sons were born of this marriage, Simon and Augustine. The family resided in the Palace of Justice, where the mother's family had occupied apartments in one of the wings since 1660.

Bruté's father had an uncle and two brothers in holy orders. Abbé Jean, the older of the brothers, was a doctor of the Sorbonne and pastor of Saint Benedict's Church in Paris. He was the author of several valuable literary works. The younger, Abbé Bruté de Loirelle, was royal censor of Belles-Lettres at Paris, and was the author of several works in prose and verse. Moreover, he made valuable translations from the writings of German and English authors. Bruté's mother had an uncle who belonged to the Premonstratensians, and a sister in the Daughters of Charity of Saint Vincent de Paul.

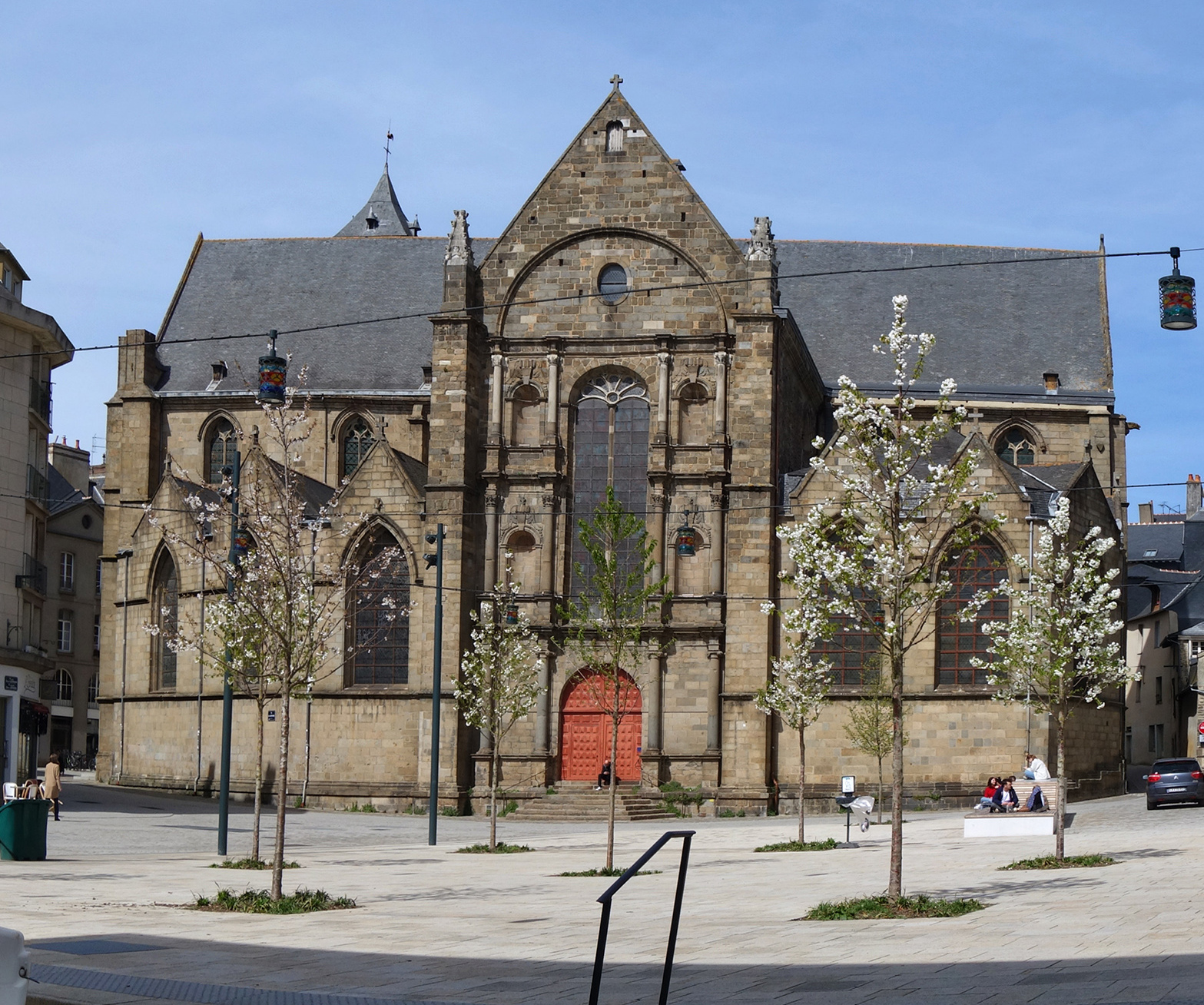
The Church of St. Germain in Rennes, where Bruté was baptized and received his first holy Communion

Bruté was born at night on March 20, 1779, at Rennes, France, and baptized early in the morning of the same day in the Saint-Germain de Rennes church of St. Germain Église. His brother Augustine was born in 1784. Bruté's father served as Director of the Finances of his native province with the promise of succession to the more remunerative office of Farmer-General of the revenues at Paris. Bruté's mother often addressed him in the words, "you were born to live in opulence." However, the family's fortunes changed with the sudden death of Bruté's father. Bruté later wrote, "'You were born to live in opulence,' my good mother often said to me ... [but] God ordered it otherwise. My father died (27th February, 1786) a few days after a very painful operation which had been rendered necessary by a fall from his Horse—and instead of a succession of opulence, left his affairs in the greatest disorder. Your Father, my Mother often said to me, could never be made to distrust anyone; he believed every person to be good and honest like himself—and the state of his accounts at the time of his death showed it." Not only were all his affairs in confusion, but it was found he was surety for the debts of others to the amount of one million francs. Friends and lawyers advised her to renounce the succession, Bruté writes, "but she, very justly, regarded an honourable name, as of more importance than wealth, and in order to preserve this to us, she determined to take upon herself the management of his affairs, even at the sacrifice of her own property." She worked day and night until she got the accounts in order, and owing to her diligence and management, all the debts were paid, with the losses much less than they would otherwise have been.

Upon the death of her second husband, Madame Bruté obtained the reversion of Francis Vatar's title of printer to the King and Parliament. This occupation afforded her only support for the family. The books edited at her office chiefly concerned law and jurisprudence, and her stock of books was valued at 130,000 francs when it was rendered obsolete by the Constituent Assembly's abolition of all local laws and customs; new publications had to be rushed to press to preserve her business from complete destruction. During the height of the French Revolution, she made young Bruté work in the print shop, learning to composite type and set pages, to save him from being enrolled in a regiment of boys aged 14 to 16 named "the Hope of the country." Despite his mother's efforts to shield him from the Reign of Terror and other horrors, the aristocratic youth still witnessed many disturbing scenes, including the trials and executions of priests and nobles. He frequented the prisons and made friends with the guards, who admitted him to the cells, where he received and delivered letters for the clergy incarcerated there. Disguised as a baker's assistant, Bruté would bring the Eucharist to imprisoned priests. The baker was, in reality, a priest in hiding.

Bruté began studying medicine in 1796 and graduated in 1803, though he never practiced medicine. Instead, after graduation, he entered the reopened seminary of Saint Sulpice in Paris in November 1803. Ordained a priest in 1808, Bruté refused the post of assistant chaplain to Napoleon I, but instead joined the Society of Saint-Sulpice, and taught theology in the diocesan seminary at Rennes from 1808 through 1810.

Due to his long interest in missions, Bruté met Benedict Joseph Flaget, who had left Saint Sulpice when it was closed during the French Revolution and then served as a missionary in the United States. Flaget had returned to the motherhouse after attempting to refuse an appointment as bishop of the new diocese of Bardstown, Kentucky.

== Missionary ==
In June 1810, Bruté sailed for Baltimore along with Flaget of Bardstown, Anthony Deydier, and others. He taught philosophy (while learning English) for two years at St. Mary's College, Baltimore. During vacations, he worked as a missionary. Bruté spent some time on the Eastern Shore. He was then sent to Mount St. Mary's College, in Emmitsburg, Maryland. In Emmitsburg, he acted both as a teacher and as pastor, as well as spiritual director to Elizabeth Ann Seton. He became known for his unselfishness, his austerity, and his spirituality, as well as for his immense erudition. In 1815, he returned to France to retrieve his library, which he donated to St. Mary's College. Upon his return that same year, he was appointed president of the college. Two years later, he returned to Emmitsburg, where he lectured on Sacred Scripture and taught Theology and Moral Philosophy at Mount St. Mary's College. In 1826, Mount St. Mary's College was no longer dependent upon the Fathers of Saint-Sulpice, its founders, so Bruté ceased to belong to that society.

== Bishop ==
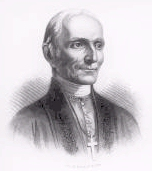
Simon William Gabriel Brute from History of the Diocese of Vincennes, 1883

French missionaries sent from Quebec had served Native Americans and fur traders throughout the region and particularly at Vincennes (founded 1732), including assisting George Rogers Clark during the American Revolution. Afterwards, the area came under the jurisdiction of the diocese of Baltimore until the creation of the diocese of Bardstown. Missionaries such as Bruté and the more experienced Fr. Stephen Badin traveled by horse, foot, flatboat, and canoe between widely scattered settlements. The neighboring Indians, called Bruté chief of the black robes and man of the true prayer.

American colonists had begun streaming over the Appalachian Mountains, joined by emigrants (including Catholic emigrants from France and Germany). Vincennes had been founded where the historic Buffalo Trace crossed the Wabash River and its subsidiary. Thousands emigrated from the East as well as the South to settle central Indiana. This caused conflict with the Native Americans, who had lost the Northwest Indian War and the War of 1812. The sheer numbers of emigrants, many Catholic, helped qualify Indiana for admission as a separate state, with Corydon as its first capital. However, the capital was soon moved north, ultimately to Indianapolis on the National Road. The state line at the Wabash River little affected missionaries such as Bruté and Badin. However, Bardstown was across the falls of the Ohio River, and Kentucky, unlike Ohio, Indiana, and Illinois, was a slave state. Slavery had become a significant spiritual as well as an economic issue in the new nation.

Rome split the diocese of Bardstown and created the Diocese of Vincennes, Indiana, in 1834, the year after the Treaty of Tippecanoe caused many Potawatomi to relocate across the Mississippi River. However, others remained, particularly the assimilated métis. In 1834, despite his protest of ill health, melancholy, and some difficulty with conversation in English ("I lose the half of it and I am not understood"), Bruté accepted the position of Bishop of Vincennes and crossed the Appalachian Mountains to serve in the newly created diocese, which encompassed all of modern-day Indiana plus eastern Illinois. He became the new diocese's first bishop and was consecrated in the same year at the Cathedral of St. Louis. On March 7, 1835, Bruté became a U.S. citizen, partly because of land ownership requirements.

The entire diocese had but three priests, including the Bishop as well as Simon Lalumiere and one other who was on loan for a year from the Diocese of St. Louis. The new bishop soon traveled to France to recruit priests and seek funds to build St. Francis Xavier Cathedral, a library, seminary, and parochial schools. In addition to his episcopal duties and pastoral work, Bruté taught theology in his seminary and one of his academies. His correspondence with leaders of the church in America and with many in France was extensive. He maintained a correspondence with Hugues Felicité Robert de Lamennais, whom he tried to reconcile with the Church both by his letters from this country and conferring with him during one of his visits to France, but without success. In 1836, Bruté returned from a trip to France with several clerical recruits, among them Benjamin Petit, who became a missionary to the Potawatomi. Bruté also drafted old acquaintances such as Anthony Deydier who arrived on the same boat as Bruté in 1810.

By the time Bruté died, the number of clergymen had grown. Bruté knew, however, that much work remained to be done. He had sought a coadjutor bishop for several years before his death, including Nicholas Petit S.J. but the Superior of the Society of Jesus refused to allow Petit to be named. On May 17, 1839, Célestine Guynemer de la Hailandière was appointed Coadjutor Bishop of Vincennes.

Bruté knew the great assistance a religious order could provide, having worked with Mother Seton and her Sisters of Charity during the founding and early years of Mount Saint Mary's College in Emmitsburg. Bruté sent Hailandière as a representative to their native France in search of a religious congregation to come to the diocese and teach, provide spiritual instruction, and assist the sick. The Sisters of Providence of Ruillé-sur-Loir sent Théodore Guérin and five others.

== Death and legacy ==
Bruté died in Vincennes, Indiana, on June 26, 1839, and was buried under the sanctuary of the cathedral there. His tremendous influence on the entire church, his success in planning, financing, and carrying out necessary ecclesiastical reforms, and the constructive and executive ability he displayed in his diocese made him one of the foremost Catholic emigrants to the United States. He wrote Brief Notes on his experiences in France in 1793, in which he described state persecution of Catholic priests.

The name of the Latin School of Indianapolis, now closed, was changed to Bishop Bruté Latin School in his honor. The Archdiocese of Indianapolis runs a college seminary named after Bruté. Students attend classes at the nearby Marian University, which offers the Bishop Simon Bruté Scholarship.

In 2005, one of Bruté's successors, Daniel M. Buechlein of the Archdiocese of Indianapolis (which was transferred from Vincennes in 1898), retained Dr. Andrea Ambrosi as a postulator to open a cause for the canonization of Bruté. It was expected that the cause would cost around $250,000, and perhaps as much as $1 million, and that it could be a few years before the Congregation for the Causes of Saints judged that Bruté led a life of heroic virtue, according him the title Venerable and preparing the way for beatification. Ambrosi had an existing relationship with the archdiocese as postulator of the cause of St. Theodora Guérin, who would be canonized by Pope Benedict XVI in 2006, and therefore had a strong prior knowledge of the early history of the Diocese of Vincennes. The cause was officially opened on September 12, 2005.

As of 2023, Bruté's cause was progressing slowly, with the historical commission still completing its work of gathering all of Bruté's extant writings (amounting to some 2,000 pages), after which the theological commission could begin its work of assessing the Catholic orthodoxy of those writings. Father Guillaume Bruté de Rémur, a descendant of Bruté's brother Augustine who grew up in France and has followed in his great-great-great-great-uncle's footsteps as a priest, missionary, and seminary rector, has expressed interest in helping to further the cause, and reports that he and his family are praying for their ancestor's canonization.

== Sources ==
- Simon Bruté profile, indianacatholic.mwweb.org
- Bayley, James Roosevelt (1860). Memoirs of the Right Reverend Simon Wm. Gabriel Bruté, D. D., First Bishop of Vincennes. New York: John Gilmary Shea.
- Bruté de Rémur, Charles (1887). Vie de Monseigneur Bruté de Rémur, premier évêque de Vincennes (États-Unis) (in French). Rennes: Plihon et Hervé.
- Clarke, Richard H. (1888). Lives of the Deceased Bishops of the Catholic Church in the United States. Vol. II (revised, enlarged and corrected ed.). New York: Richard H. Clarke. pp. 7–43.
- Godecker, Mary Salesia (1931). Simon Bruté de Rémur, First Bishop of Vincennes. St. Meinrad, IN: St. Meinrad Historical Essays.
