= Deydier =

Deydier is a surname. Notable people with the surname include:

- Anthony Deydier (1788–1864), French priest, missionary, and teacher
- Brigitte Deydier (born 1958), French judoka
