= Timothy Maude =

United States Army general (1947–2001)

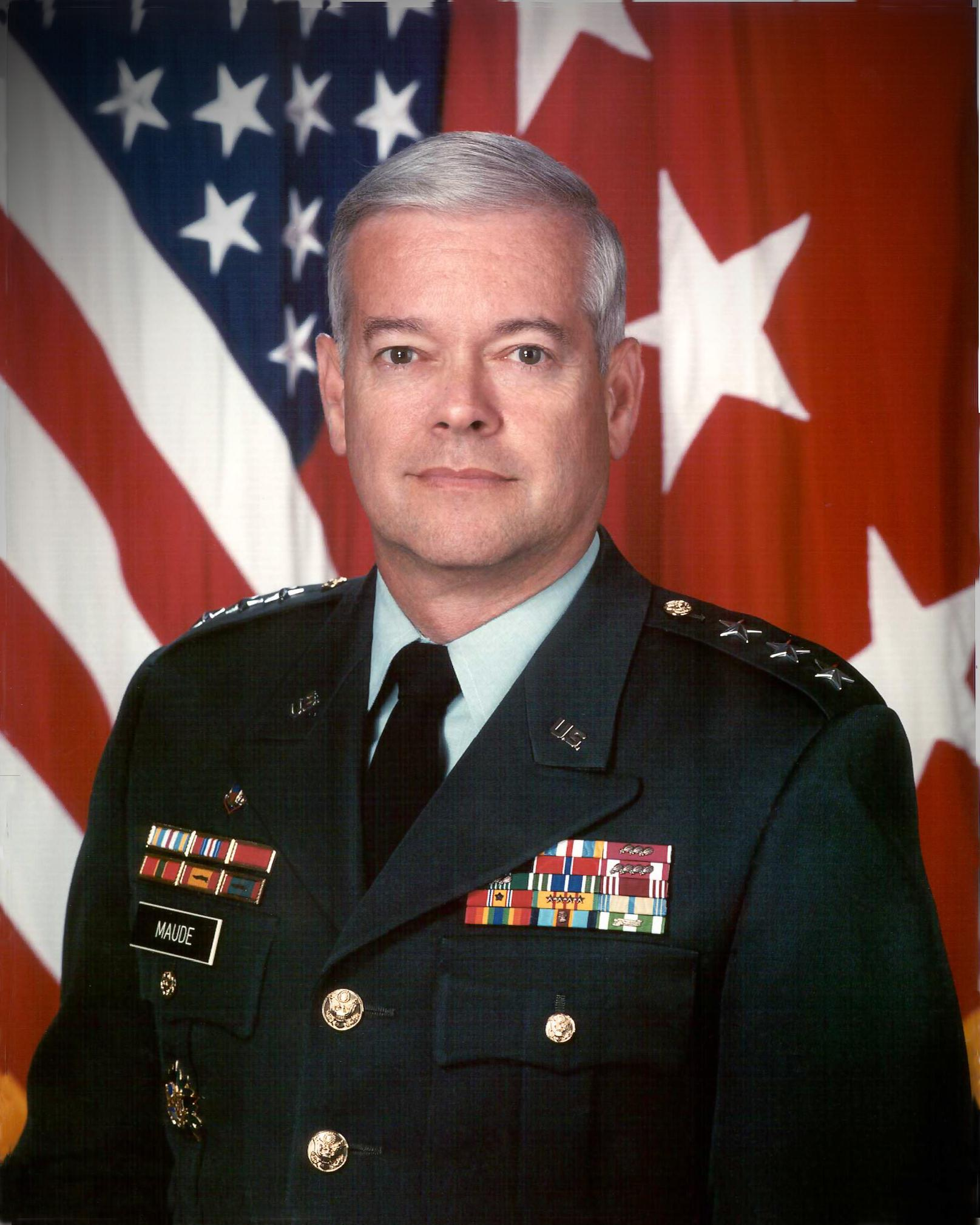
- Official portrait, c. 2000-2001
- Born: November 18, 1947; Indianapolis, Indiana, U.S.
- Died: September 11, 2001 (aged 53); The Pentagon, Virginia, U.S.
- Cause of death: Collapse of the Pentagon's southwest wall during the September 11 terrorist attacks
- Burial place: Arlington National Cemetery
- Education: Golden Gate University (BA); Ball State University (MPA)
- Spouse: Teri Maude
- Relatives: 2
- Military career
- Allegiance: United States
- Branch: United States Army
- Service years: 1966–2001
- Rank: Lieutenant General
- Conflicts: Vietnam War
- Awards: Army Distinguished Service Medal; Defense Superior Service Medal; Legion of Merit (4); Bronze Star Medal; Purple Heart

Timothy Joseph Maude (November 18, 1947 – September 11, 2001) was a lieutenant general in the United States Army. He was killed in the September 11 attacks at the Pentagon.

Maude was the highest ranking U.S. military officer killed in the September 11 attacks and the most senior United States Army officer killed by foreign action since the death of Lieutenant General Simon Bolivar Buckner Jr. on June 18, 1945, in the Battle of Okinawa during World War II. Maude had been serving as the U.S. Army's Deputy Chief of Staff for Personnel and was at a meeting when American Airlines Flight 77 crashed into the west side of the Pentagon. His offices had just days before been moved to the most recently renovated section of the Pentagon.

== Early life ==
Maude was born in Indianapolis, Indiana, on November 18, 1947. He joined the United States Army as an enlisted soldier on March 21, 1966, when he was eighteen years old. He initially intended to become a priest and graduated from the Latin School of Indianapolis, a Roman Catholic seminary high school, but received his commission as a second lieutenant upon completing Officer Candidate School in February 1967. He earned a Bachelor of Arts in management from Golden Gate University and a Master of Public Administration from Ball State University.

== Career ==
Upon commission, Maude served one year in South Vietnam. The remainder of his career was spent in the continental United States, West Germany, and South Korea. His assignments included:

- Deputy Chief of Staff for Personnel and Installation Management, Seventh United States Army, also known as United States Army Europe (USAREUR) and Seventh Army
- Deputy Chief of Staff for Personnel

Maude was stationed in Washington, D.C. by August 1998 and was nominated as Deputy Chief of Staff for Personnel by President Clinton's Secretary of Defense, William S. Cohen, in May 2000.

Maude introducing the Army of One recruitment drive

Maude began the "Army of One" recruiting campaign, primarily utilizing television and internet advertising. He testified before the U.S. Congress concerning the necessity of meeting recruiting goals to fulfill the United States Army's missions. In September 2001, he announced that the Army of One campaign was drawing more recruits. On September 4, 2001, it was reported that the United States Army had met its goals early for active duty soldiers and that the United States Army Reserve and United States Army National Guard would meet theirs by the end of the month.

=== Views on homosexuality ===
Maude was a "point man" for the Don't Ask Don't Tell policy and matters concerning LGBT issues. When Private First Class Barry Winchell was murdered by Calvin Glover because it was rumored that Winchell was gay, Maude was one of the Army leaders who met with Winchell's mother, Patricia Kutteles.

C. Dixon Osburn, executive director of Servicemembers Legal Defense Network, said in a press release: "Lt. Gen. Maude has played a pivotal role in developing and implementing key programs related to LGBT military personnel."

== Death ==
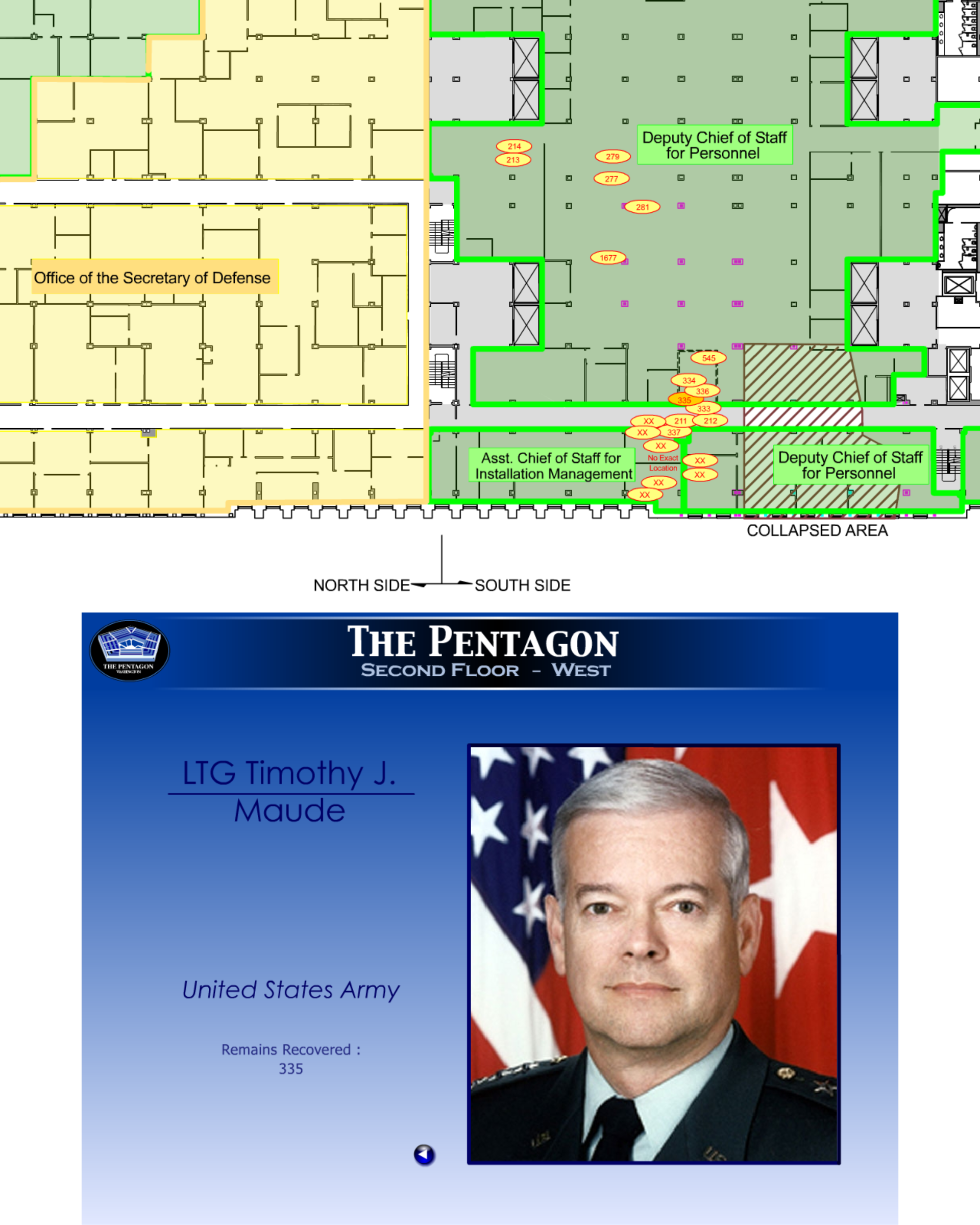
Information about the recovery of Maude's remains

On September 11, 2001, Maude was working as the United States Army's Deputy Chief of Staff for Personnel and was in a meeting when American Airlines Flight 77 crashed into the west side of the Pentagon. His offices had just days before been moved to the most recently renovated section of the Pentagon. He was the highest ranking military officer killed in the attacks, and the senior-most United States Army officer killed by foreign action since the death of Lieutenant General Simon Bolivar Buckner Jr. on June 18, 1945, in the Battle of Okinawa during World War II.

== Personal life ==
Maude was survived by his wife, Teri, and two daughters, Karen Maude and Kathleen Koehler.

== Awards and decorations ==

1st row	Distinguished Service Medal		
2nd row	Defense Superior Service Medal	Legion of Merit with three oak leaf clusters	Bronze Star Medal
3rd row	Purple Heart Medal (posthumously)	Meritorious Service Medal with four oak leaf clusters	Army Commendation Medal with two oak leaf clusters
4th row	Army Achievement Medal	Good Conduct Medal	National Defense Service Medal with two service stars
5th row	Vietnam Service Medal with four service stars	Global War on Terrorism Service Medal (posthumously)	Armed Forces Reserve Medal
6th row	Army Service Ribbon	Overseas Service Ribbon	Vietnam Campaign Medal

Unit awards

Joint Meritorious Unit Award	Valorous Unit Award	Meritorious Unit Commendation
Superior Unit Award	Republic of Vietnam Gallantry; Cross Unit Citation	Civil Actions Unit Citation

== Legacy ==
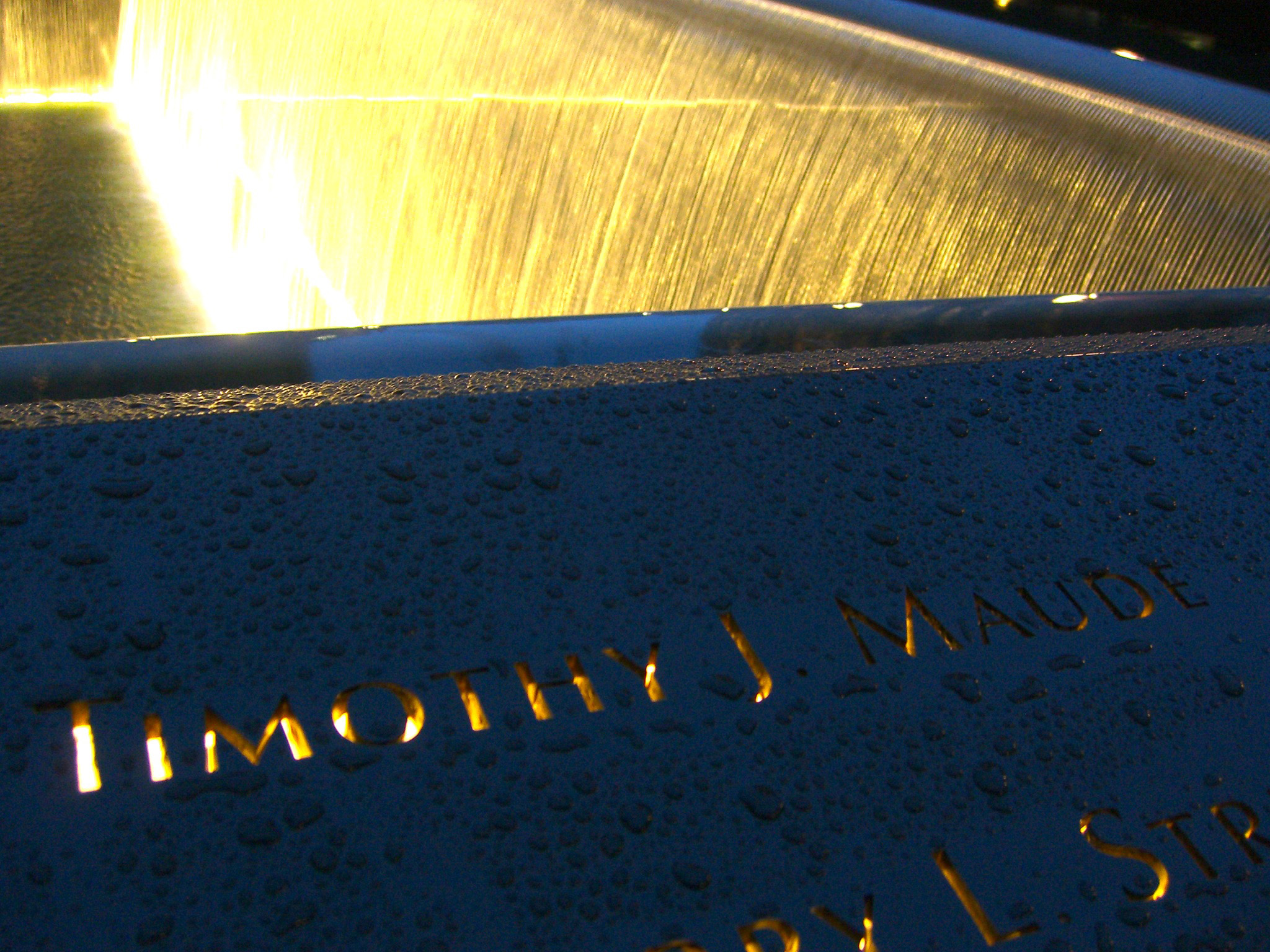
Maude's name is located on Panel S-74 of the National September 11 Memorial’s North Pool, along with the names of those who were aboard United Airlines Flight 93.

Maude's remains were recovered a few days later and were interred at Arlington National Cemetery on October 6, 2001. Almost seven months later, on April 30, 2002, the Lieutenant General Timothy J. Maude Center for Human Resources was dedicated in his honor at the Campbell Barracks in Heidelberg, Germany, where he served from 1995 to 1998 as the Deputy Chief of Staff for Personnel and Installation Management. It was his last assignment before being stationed in Washington, D.C.

In 2010, the United States Army Human Resources Command named their new Center of Excellence at Fort Knox, Kentucky, after Maude.

At the National 9/11 Memorial, Maude is memorialized at the South Pool, on Panel S-74.

The Knights of Columbus named the Timothy J. Maude Council 10292 in Wiesbaden, Germany, in Maude's memory.
