= Diocese of Bardstown =

Former Roman Catholic diocese in the United States

Coordinates: 37.810833°N 85.472222°W

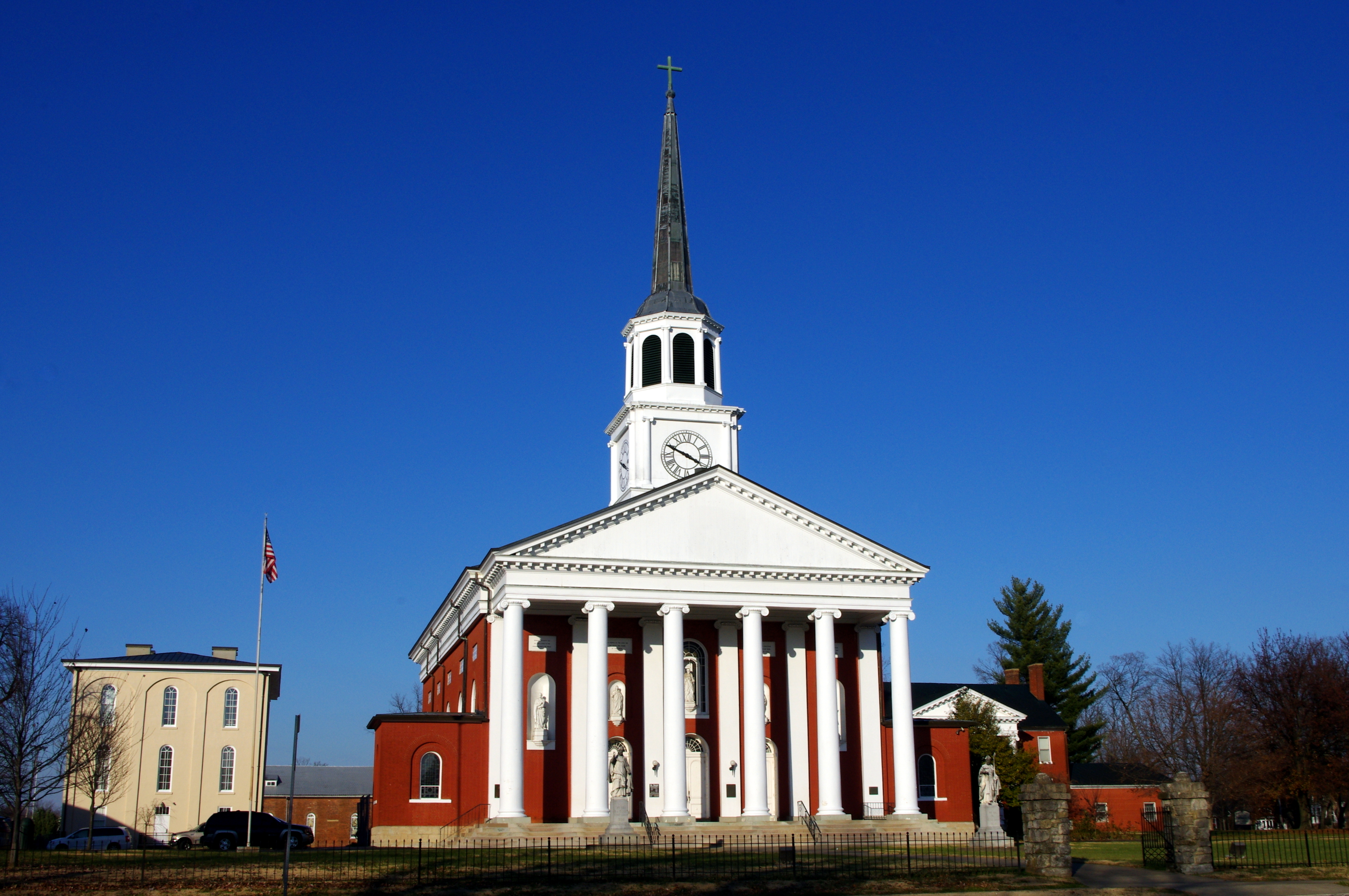
Basilica of Saint Joseph Proto-Cathedral (Bardstown, Kentucky)

The Diocese of Bardstown (Latin: Dioecesis Bardensis) was a Latin Church Catholic diocese in the United States established in Bardstown, Kentucky on April 8, 1808, along with the Diocese of Boston, Diocese of New York, and Diocese of Philadelphia, comprising the former territory of the Diocese of Baltimore west of the Appalachian Mountains. The Diocese of Baltimore simultaneously became a metropolitan archdiocese with the four new sees as its suffragans. The title of the former Diocese of Bardstown changed to Diocese of Louisville with the transfer of its see from Bardstown to Louisville in 1841.

When founded, the Bardstown Diocese included most of Kentucky, Tennessee, Missouri, Illinois, Indiana, Ohio and Michigan. The geographical area was large, and today there are 44 dioceses in the area of the original diocese.

== History ==
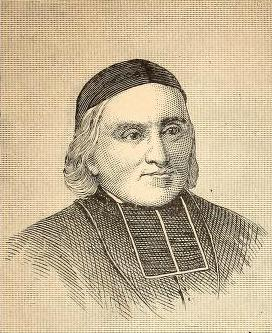
Bishop Flaget

The first Catholic immigrants to the area came from Maryland in the year 1785, founding Holy Cross Church as the first Catholic church in the state. By 1796 it is estimated that there were 300 Catholic families in Kentucky. Among the early missionaries were Stephen Badin and Michel Barriere who set out on foot for Kentucky on September 3, 1793, sent by Bishop John Carroll of Baltimore. In April, 1794 Barriere left Bardstown, for New Orleans but Badin established the home base for his missionary journeys on Pottinger's Creek. For the next 14 years Badin travelled on foot, horseback and boat between widely scattered Catholic settlements in Kentucky and the Northwest Territory. After the departure of Barriêres, for three years Badin was the only priest in the whole of Kentucky. In 1797 M.J.C. Fournier and, in 1799, Anthony Salmon joined Badin, but the latter was killed by a fall from a horse nine months after his arrival, and Fournier died in 1803. In 1805 he received permanent help with the arrival of Charles Nerinckx.

The Dominicans arrived in Springfield in 1805. The Sisters of Loretto were founded in Marion County in 1812, that same year, Sisters of Charity of Nazareth were founded near Bardstown. A French colony arrived at Louisville in the year 1806 and settled near the Falls of the Ohio, to engage in the milling business, utilizing the falls for power. Their first church was built in 1811; Badin was the first pastor, and continued as such until 1817.

In 1808, Bardstown became a diocese in its own right, when Benedict Joseph Flaget was appointed by the Holy See as the first Bishop of the newly established Diocese of Bardstown on April 8, 1808. Land for the new diocese was taken from the first American diocese, the Diocese of Baltimore, which comprised an area of 890,000 square miles. The new diocese comprised 8,127 miles, an area now covering 10 modern states, including Kentucky, Ohio, Tennessee, Michigan, Indiana and others. But Flaget opposed the appointment and traveled to France in an effort to have it reversed. He was unsuccessful in this effort. On his return trip to the United States, Flaget brought other early Sulpician missionaries to America: Simon Bruté, Guy Ignatius Chabrat, Anthony Deydier, and James Derigaud. The first two also became bishops in America. Upon his arrival, Flaget was consecrated a bishop by now-Archbishop Carroll on November 4, 1810, in a ceremony at the Baltimore Cathedral, now a basilica. So only three years after his appointment did Flaget arrive in Kentucky, and the following year he returned to Baltimore with Badin to discuss land title and other problems.

Upon taking office, Flaget found himself charged with the pastoral care of the western frontier of the United States, having the assistance of seven priests. Saint Thomas Seminary was established in 1811, and Saint Joseph College in Bardstown in 1820. The college was closed during the American Civil War and the building briefly served as a hospital for Union soldiers. Saint Mary College was founded in 1821. Before it was closed in 1976, it was the third oldest Catholic college for boys in the country.

The Diocese of Bardstown established its first church, Saint Thomas Parish, within four years of its founding. The diocese eventually increased the number of parishes to 23, and the number of priests from six to 36 within the first 25 years of its founding. The cornerstone of historic Basilica of Saint Joseph Proto-Cathedral was laid on July 16, 1816. Many of the paintings and interior decorations were donated by Pope Leo XII, King Louis-Philippe of France and others. The former cathedral of the Diocese of Bardstown, it is now a parish church. Flaget was responsible for a growing network of congregations.

John Baptist Mary David (who had been with Flaget in Kentucky since 1810) was ordained a bishop and named Flaget's co-adjutor in 1817, but for two years he tried to refuse the difficult position. He briefly succeeded Flaget in 1832, but he resigned less than a year later, when Flaget was again appointed to head the diocese.

Tennessee was separated from the diocese in 1837 when the Diocese of Nashville was established by Pope Gregory XVI.

In 1841, the diocese was transferred from Bardstown to Louisville and was renamed the Diocese of Louisville with its Cathedral of the Assumption. Later it was raised to Archdiocese of Louisville. The Diocese of Bardstown, no longer a residential bishopric, is today listed by the Catholic Church as a titular see.

Pope Benedict XVI's visit to the United States in April 2008 celebrated the 200th anniversary of the 1808 creation of the new dioceses and the elevation of Baltimore to an archdiocese.

== Sources ==
- Succession of Bishop Benedict Joseph Flaget, P.S.S.
- Cathedrals in the Wilderness, J. Herman Schauinger, The Bruce Publishing Company (1952).
