= Hell Opened to Christians =

17th-century religious tract

L'Inferno aperto al cristiano perchè non v'entri, also known in its English translation as Hell Opened to Christians: To Caution Them from Entering into It, is a Roman Catholic religious tract by Fr. Giovanni Pietro Pinamonti, SJ originally written in Italian and published in 1688. It consists of seven daily meditations on the punishment of mortal sin in Hell. The work would later be used by the Irish author James Joyce as a source for the retreat sermons heard by protagonist Stephen Dedalus in the novel A Portrait of the Artist as a Young Man, published in 1916.

== Background ==
Hell Opened to Christians was written by the Italian priest and author Giovanni Pietro Pinamonti. Pinamonti was born on December 27, 1632, in Pistoia to a family of noble origin. In 1647, he entered the Society of Jesus. He was forced by illness to give up his studies, abandoning a teaching career for mission work in the Italian countryside. In this capacity he was companion to the famed preacher Paolo Segneri, SJ for twenty-six years. Pinamonti's own preaching brought him the friendship of Cosimo III de' Medici and other notables, and his writings brought him fame beyond Italy. Aside from Hell Opened to Christians, his other works include La Religiosa in solitudine (1695) and Il Direttore (1705). He died on June 25, 1703.

Hell Opened to Christians is a devotional work in the Ignatian meditative tradition. This tradition originates with Saint Ignatius of Loyola's Spiritual Exercises, published in 1548. Works in this tradition consist of imaginative reflections on scriptural themes, in which an individual vividly imagines and meditates on scenes from scripture. This technique is called "composition of place", and it is used throughout Pinamonti's work. Hell was a common subject for such reflections, as this corresponded with the first, introductory week of the Spiritual Exercises. This tradition was "brought to a peak of elaboration and refinement" in the writings of several 17th century Italian Jesuits, including Pinamonti.

== Contents ==
Hell Opened to Christians consists of seven daily meditations on the punishment of mortal sin in hell. These meditations, called "Considerations" within the text, contain a specific topic analyzed under three aspects and conclude with a short prayer. The work's consideration on the punishments of Hell is twofold, analyzing the Poena Sensus (pain of the senses) and Poena Damni (pain of the loss of Heaven). The first three days' meditations treat the Poena Sensus, specifically focusing on 1. the prison of Hell, 2. the fire of Hell, and 3. the company of the Damned. The last four days' meditations treat the Poena Damni, specifically focusing on 4. the pain of loss, 5. the sting of conscience, 6. the pain of "Extension" (viz. despair from comparison with the state of the saints), and 7. the eternity of Hell. The meditations elaborate greatly on each of these themes, and contain many citations from scripture and the Church Fathers.

=== Outline ===
First Consideration: Sunday

The Prison of Hell

1. Its Straightness
2. Its Darkness
3. Its Stench

Prayer to the Eternal Father

Second Consideration: Monday

The Fire

1. Its Quality
2. Its Quantity
3. Its Intenseness

Prayer to the Eternal Word

Third Consideration: Tuesday

1. The Company of the Damned
2. Of the Devils
3. Of Accomplices in Sin

Prayer to the Holy Spirit

Fourth Consideration: Wednesday

1. The Pain of Eternal Loss
2. The Loss is Most Sorrowful
3. It is Due to Sin

Prayer to Jesus Christ

Fifth Consideration: Thursday

The Sting of Conscience

1. Memory of Past Pleasures
2. Sorrow for Sins Committed
3. Good Occasions Neglected

Prayer to the Guardian Angel

Sixth Consideration: Friday

The Despair

1. The Extension of the Pains
2. The Intensity
3. From Comparison with the Glorified

Prayer to Holy Name

Seventh Consideration: Saturday

1. The Eternity of Endless Pain
2. It is Unchanging
3. It is Just

Prayer to the Most Holy Virgin

== Impact ==
Hell Opened to Christians proved to be a popular and influential work. It went through numerous editions in Italian and was translated into Latin, French, German, Spanish, Portuguese, Greek, Dutch, and English. Copies of the work have been held in numerous libraries, such as the National Library of Ireland and the University of Notre Dame. By the late 19th century, Hell Opened to Christians was still well-known, enough to be cited in English language debates about the nature of Hell. For instance, it was referred to disapprovingly by Frederic William Farrar in his "Eternal Hope" sermons and by St. George Jackson Mivart in his article "Happiness in Hell" in The Nineteenth Century. In his 1905 book Recollections, William O'Brien described the effect that woodcut illustrations in an edition of Hell Opened to Christians had on him as a youth.

Perhaps the most modern legacy of Hell Opened to Christians is its influence on the Irish author James Joyce. Pinamonti's work is generally held to be the main source of a sermon given by a character in Joyce's 1916 novel A Portrait of the Artist as a Young Man. In Chapter III of Joyce's book, protagonist Stephen Dedalus attends a retreat given at his school, Belvedere College, by Fr. Arnall, a Jesuit priest. The topic of the retreat is the Four Last Things: death, judgement, Hell, and Heaven. During the retreat, Arnall gives two sermons on Hell, the first on the pain of the senses and the second on the pain of loss. After hearing these sermons, Stephen Dedalus has a conversion of heart, makes confession, and receives the Eucharist, resolving to amend his life. However, Stephen's new piety is short-lived, as he eventually rejects the Church as one of the "nets flung at [the soul] to hold it back from flight."

Hell Opened to Christians was first proposed as the source for Arnall's two sermons by James R. Thrace of Northwestern University in a February 1960 article in the journal Modern Philology. This was followed in November 1960 by an article in the journal Modern Language Notes by Elizabeth F. Boyd of Douglass College, who independently arrived at much the same conclusion. Both articles analyzed Joyce's text and found major similarities with Pinamonti's text in language and structure. Both authors therefore concluded that Joyce used Hell Opened to Christians as an important model when composing Arnall's sermons, adapting it for use in his novel. This conclusion was extended by James Doherty of the Latin School of Indianapolis, who in a November 1963 article in Modern Philology presented an argument about which edition of Hell Opened to Christians might have been used by Joyce. That Hell Opened to Christians was used by Joyce is now generally accepted by Joyce scholars.

== List of editions ==
- L'Inferno aperto al cristiano perchè non v'entri. Naples: Bonis Stamp. Arciv., 1689.
- L'Inferno aperto al cristiano perchè non v'entri. Rome: Domenico Antonio Ercole, 1691.
- Hell opened to Christians, to caution them from entering into it. Dublin: R. Grace, 1831.
- L'Inferno aperto al cristiano perchè non v'entri. Monza: Tipografia Cobbetta, 1836.
- Hell opened to Christians; to caution them from entering into it. Philadelphia: Henry McGrath, 1845.
- Hell opened to Christians; to caution them from entering into it. Derby: Thomas Richardson & Son, 1845.
- Hell opened to Christians to caution them from entering into it. Dublin: C. M. Warren, 1857.
- Hell open to Christians, to caution them from entering into it. Dublin: Irish Messenger, 1933.
- "Into That Eternal Furnace: From Giovanni Pietro Pinamonti’s Hell Opened to Christians to Caution Them from Entering into It" in The Penguin Book of Hell. New York: Penguin Books, 2018.
