= Paul Palmieri (entrepreneur) =

American entrepreneur (born 1970)

- Born: August 25, 1970 (age 56); New Britain, Connecticut
- Education: Mount St. Mary's University
- Occupations: Venture advisor, New Enterprise Associates

Paul Palmieri (born August 25, 1970) is an American entrepreneur and business leader in the mobile telecommunications and digital advertising industries. He was the chairman and chief executive officer of Millennial Media (NYSE:MM), a company he co-founded in 2006 with Chris Brandenburg, until his resignation in January 2014. He is currently a Venture Advisor with New Enterprise Associates.

== Early life and education ==
Palmieri was born in New Britain, Connecticut. He grew up in the Oakhurst section of Ocean Township, Monmouth County, New Jersey, and attended Red Bank Catholic High School, where he performed in school plays. He then went to Mount St. Mary's University where he graduated with a B.A. in political science.

== Career ==
Following his graduation, Palmieri spent 15 years working as a business development and telecom executive at companies including Sprint and Verizon Wireless. At Verizon, Palmieri ran data efforts and helped grow data revenue from $35MM a year into a multiple billion dollar business. Palmieri devoted much of his time to helping establish the foundations of the mobile content ecosystem and the app economy.

Palmieri co-founded Millennial Media in May 2006, and in his position as president and CEO, led the company's growth into an independent mobile advertising platform.

In March 2012, Millennial Media became a publicly traded company and its common stock is now listed on the NYSE under the ticker symbol MM.

Palmieri is the global vice chairman of the Mobile Marketing Association and a member of the board of directors at the Interactive Advertising Bureau (IAB).

On January 27, 2014, Palmieri stepped down from his position as CEO at Millennial Media to take on a role as Venture Advisor at New Enterprise Associates. He was succeeded by Michael Barrett, a former Yahoo! Chief Revenue Officer.

== Awards ==
In 2010 Palmieri was named Ernst and Young Entrepreneur of the Year in Maryland.
