= Michael McCafferty =

American entrepreneur

- Born: September 7, 1942 (age 84); Philadelphia, Pennsylvania
- Education: Mount St. Mary's University
- Occupations: Serial Entrepreneur Advisor to Entrepreneurs: Author; Race Car Driver; Pool Shooter Open Cockpit Biplane Adventure Aviator
- Website: dblm.com

Michael McCafferty (born September 7, 1942) is an American serial entrepreneur, inventor, and programmer. He is known as the "Father of CRM" for having invented and coded TeleMagic, the first #CRM (Customer Relationship Management) software product for PCs. After graduating from college in 1964, he was recruited to work for IBM as a new account territory sales rep in Hagerstown, Maryland. He then became founder/CEO of Technitrol, Inc.'s startup subsidiary named Eastern Data Processing, until 1974. After his startup called PAL (Product & Area Locator), the first computerized Yellow Pages, in San Diego, failed, he filed for bankruptcy on March 17, 1983. He went on to create TeleMagic as the founder/CEO of his company Remote Control International. The software was met with positive reception both in terms of sales figures as well as customer reception. This success led his company and the software he created to eventually be purchased by The Sage Group in 1992. During his college years, he worked on entrepreneurial endeavors, including a birthday cake delivery service, a restaurant, and advertising. He currently works as a mentor to other startup founders/CEOs.

== Personal life ==
Michael McCafferty was born in Philadelphia, Pennsylvania, on September 7, 1942, to Verna M. McCafferty and Charles F. McCafferty. He is the second oldest of six siblings. He has two children and currently resides in Del Mar, California.

== Career and education ==
In his early life, McCafferty worked on repairing bicycles with his brother, and in high school, he worked at a gas station. He was accepted into Mount St. Mary's College in September 1960. He went into multiple career paths during college, including selling advertising space to local retailers on desk blotters, birthday cake sales and delivery, and a restaurant called "The Purple Onion." McCafferty was employed by IBM as a salesperson shortly after he graduated from college. He became a top producer at IBM, and he sold computers in multiple states, including Pennsylvania, West Virginia, Virginia, and Maryland. He used his career at IBM to learn more about computers and running a business. After three years, he left IBM and began working on his own business ventures.

=== Eastern Data Processing ===
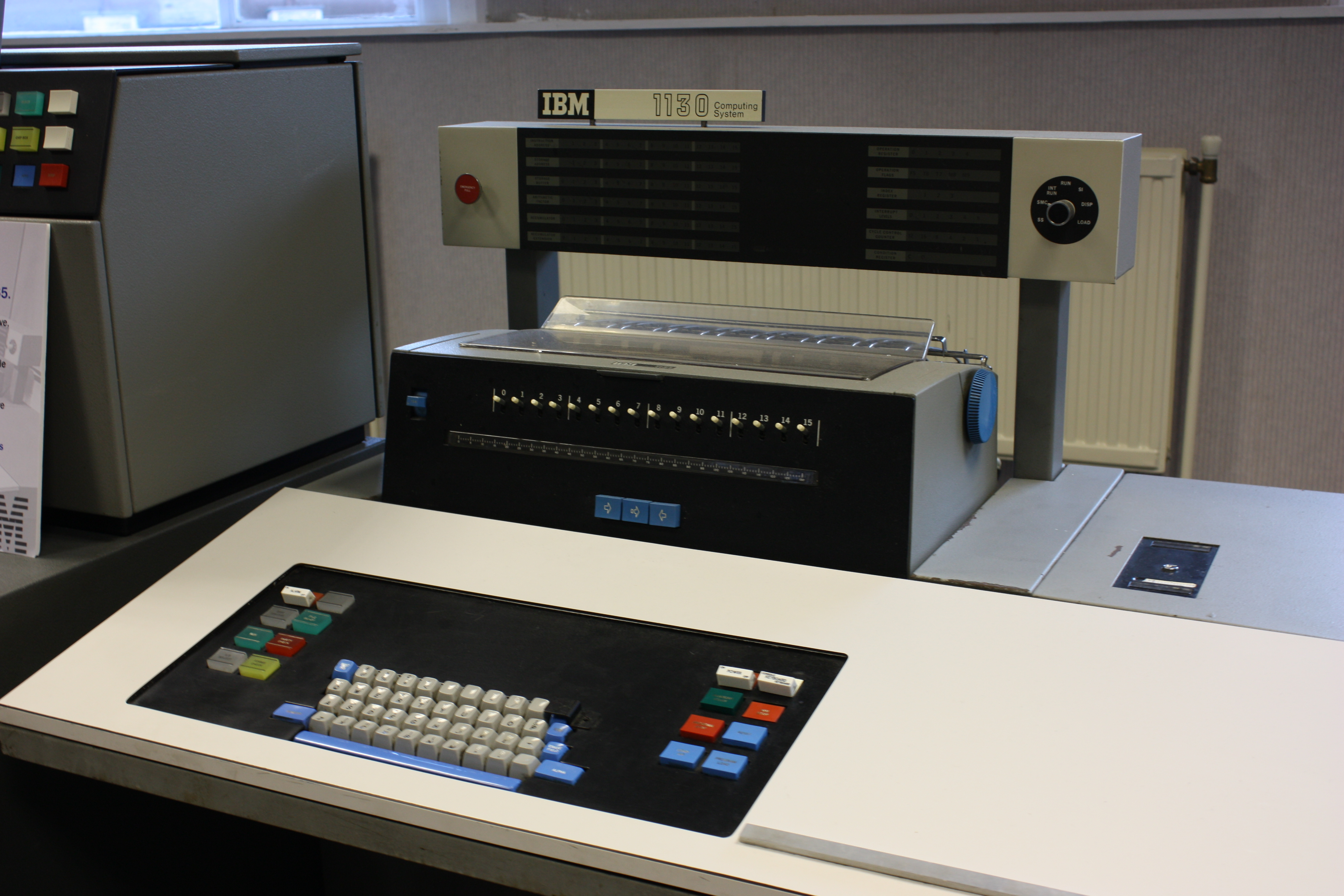
An IBM 1130 console

McCafferty got a job as a solo programmer at Technitrol, Inc., in Philadelphia programming on an IBM 1130 computer. The company's president hired him due to his lack of experience with programming, McCafferty's background with IBM, and his understanding of the programming language FORTRAN. After a year employed as a programmer and manager of the Data Processing department, he and the president of Technitrol decided to form a company in 1968 called Eastern Data Processing (EDP) as a subsidiary of Technitrol when McCafferty was only 26. The goal of this company was to provide computerized payroll services to businesses. It was intended to compete with a similar business called "Automatic Data Processing". McCafferty was the company's president, and he had a 20% share in the company. In the first six months of the company's operation, the company saw $400,000 in losses, which was due in part to the fact that much of its business was not related to its intended business structure. As such, the company did not have a product to sell. Nevertheless, the Technitrol president allowed him to continue working with the company, though with a new vision for it. McCafferty then spent the next six years building a profitable business. Despite these problems that the business faced early on, the combined success of it and other subsidiaries of Technitrol contributed to the parent company's success. The company experienced a 125% increase in sales between 1972 and 1973, an increase from $4.7 million to $10.6 million. Profits increased from $107,000 to $466,000. When his employer, E. Stuart Eichert, died, McCafferty learned that his promised shares in the company were not set in writing, and thus he lost his ownership in the company. He quit immediately. The first prototype for EDP ran on an IBM 360 Model 30 with IBM 2311 disk storage drives and two Tape Drives, and was programmed in COBOL. During seven years, it grew to support three-shift work days and was used for thousands of companies’ payrolls.

=== After EDP ===
When he left EDP, he went to work in Chicago, Illinois, to work for Robert F. White & Company as the company's vice president of operations. In his new position, he was tasked with converting physical punch cards to tape/disk payroll files. After working there for two years, he moved to San Diego strictly for the weather.

=== TeleMagic ===
Michael filed for Chapter 7 personal bankruptcy on March 17, 1983. Following his filing, Michael went on to invent and program the first #CRM (Customer Relationship Management) product for the PC called TeleMagic, which was made for use by salespeople and entrepreneurs to keep track of customers and prospects. The product was marketed by his company, Remote Control International. The software was originally intended to be sold to telemarketers but quickly became popular in more sales markets. The program could be integrated with other software applications, including word processors and accounting. The program was originally released for MS-DOS in 1985, and later in 1987, versions of the program were released on Unix and Macintosh systems. While it was originally intended for use in the United States, it was expanded to other regions in 1988, including Canada, Sweden, the United Kingdom, Ireland, France, Australia, Singapore, South Africa, Russia, and others. Remote Control International was generally successful and ranked 79th and 348th on Inc. 500's list of the Fastest Growing Companies in 1991 and 1992, respectively. The company was later purchased by The Sage Group on October 2, 1992, which allowed Michael to retire. After its purchase, TeleMagic was made available for Windows in 1993, and Remote Control International was renamed to TeleMagic Inc. in 1994. It did not have any more software releases on later platforms after this. This is believed to be due in part to Sage's financial issues following the purchase of the company, and the fact that TeleMagic under Sage was posting losses at about one million pounds per year. On February 14, 2007, the Computer History Museum in Mountain View, California, accepted TeleMagic-related software and related items to preserve them. The product received praise around its release as well beyond its lifespan. The Baltimore Sun's Patrick Rossello called TeleMagic the "hot software for this effort and is reasonably priced at many software stores." including from a writer for Forbes.com who stated that TeleMagic felt that "had seen more robust solutions 20 years ago in TeleMagic than were readily available on the Salesforce.com platform." Other websites such as CMO.com.au gave TeleMagic credit for "marketers to consolidate, manage and track customer information." Not all reception was positive, however; according to The Guardian's Guy Clapperton, Jane Harrad-Roberts, the consultant director of the company Marketing Projects, chose to drop TeleMagic after The Sage Group purchased it, feeling that they had made it a worse product.
