= Kielce Gussie =

American journalist

- Born: Florida
- Education: Mount St. Mary's University
- Occupation: Journalist
- Years active: 2019–present
- Organization: Vatican News

Kielce Gussie is an American journalist for Vatican News.

Gussie is originally from Florida and was raised Catholic. She attended Annunciation Catholic School in Middleburg, Florida as well as Bishop Snyder High School in Jacksonville, Florida. She received a Bachelor of Arts degree in theology from Mount St. Mary's University in Maryland in 2019 and moved to Rome that same year. She worked as a production assistant for EWTN in 2020 before becoming a journalist for Rome Reports. She joined Vatican News in October 2024.

Gussie read from the Acts of the Apostles at the beginning of the funeral of Pope Francis on April 26, 2025. She had learned that she would speak at the funeral just three days prior. She had met Pope Francis twice before; the first time they met, he blessed her rosary, and the second time they met was on her birthday.
