= TeleMagic =

1980s CRM Customer Relationship Management system

TeleMagic is the name of the first customer relationship management software product for personal computers designed for salespeople and entrepreneurs for the purpose of keeping track of customers and prospects. Originally, the software was sold into the telemarketing marketplace and quickly evolved into mainstream sales applications. Subsequently, there were many competitive products that came to market to perform these functions, and this category eventually became known as contact management software, then sales force automation software, and ultimately customer relationship management software.

== History ==
TeleMagic was invented by Michael McCafferty in 1985 and marketed by his company Remote Control International. On October 2, 1992, the company was sold to The Sage Group. As of 2023, TeleMagic continues to be sold and supported by a network of value-added resellers (VARs) and consultants.

== Features ==
TeleMagic is unique in several ways:

1. From the earliest versions of the software, TeleMagic was designed to be interfaced with other manufacturer's software, such as Word Processors (for letter writing), and accounting for Order Entry, enabling users to fully record sales without exiting the program.
2. A Developer's Kit allowed the product to be tailored to the specific needs of various vertical markets.
3. Add-on products became available using the built-in customizing features, the Developer's Kit, and completely standalone products.
4. TeleMagic is sold through a network of value-added resellers who provide on-site support, integration services, training, etc.

== Market reception ==
The product received praise around its release as well as beyond its lifespan. In 1995, PC Magazine applauded its customization stating "TeleMagic is hard to beat". The Baltimore Sun's Patrick Rossello called TeleMagic the "hot software for this effort and is reasonably priced at many software stores." including from a writer for Forbes.com who stated that TeleMagic felt that "had seen more robust solutions 20 years ago in TeleMagic, than were readily available on the Salesforce.com platform." Other websites such as CMO.com.au gave TeleMagic credit for "marketers to consolidate, manage and track customer information." Not all reception was positive however; according to The Guardian's Guy Clapperton, Jane Harrad-Roberts, the consultant director of the company Marketing Projects, chose to drop TeleMagic after The Sage Group purchased it, feeling that they had made it a worse product.

== Timeline ==
- 1985, January – MS-DOS version created for first customer Coffee Ambassador, San Diego, CA
- 1987 – Macintosh version created
- 1987 – Unix version created
- 1988 – expansion into Canada, UK, Ireland, France, Switzerland, Netherlands, Australia, South Africa, Singapore, Sweden and Russia
- 1991 – Inc. 500 Fastest Growing Company (#79)
- 1992 – Inc. 500 Fastest Growing Company (#348)
- 1992, October 2 – TeleMagic company sold to The Sage Group
- 1993 – Windows version released
- 1994 – Company name changed from Remote Control International to TeleMagic, Inc.
- 2007 – (Feb 14) – Computer History Museum in Mountain View, California accepts donation of many TeleMagic-related artifacts & software
