= Benedict Joseph Flaget =

Catholic bishop (1763–1850)

The Right Reverend Benedict Joseph Flaget SS
- Bishop of Louisville
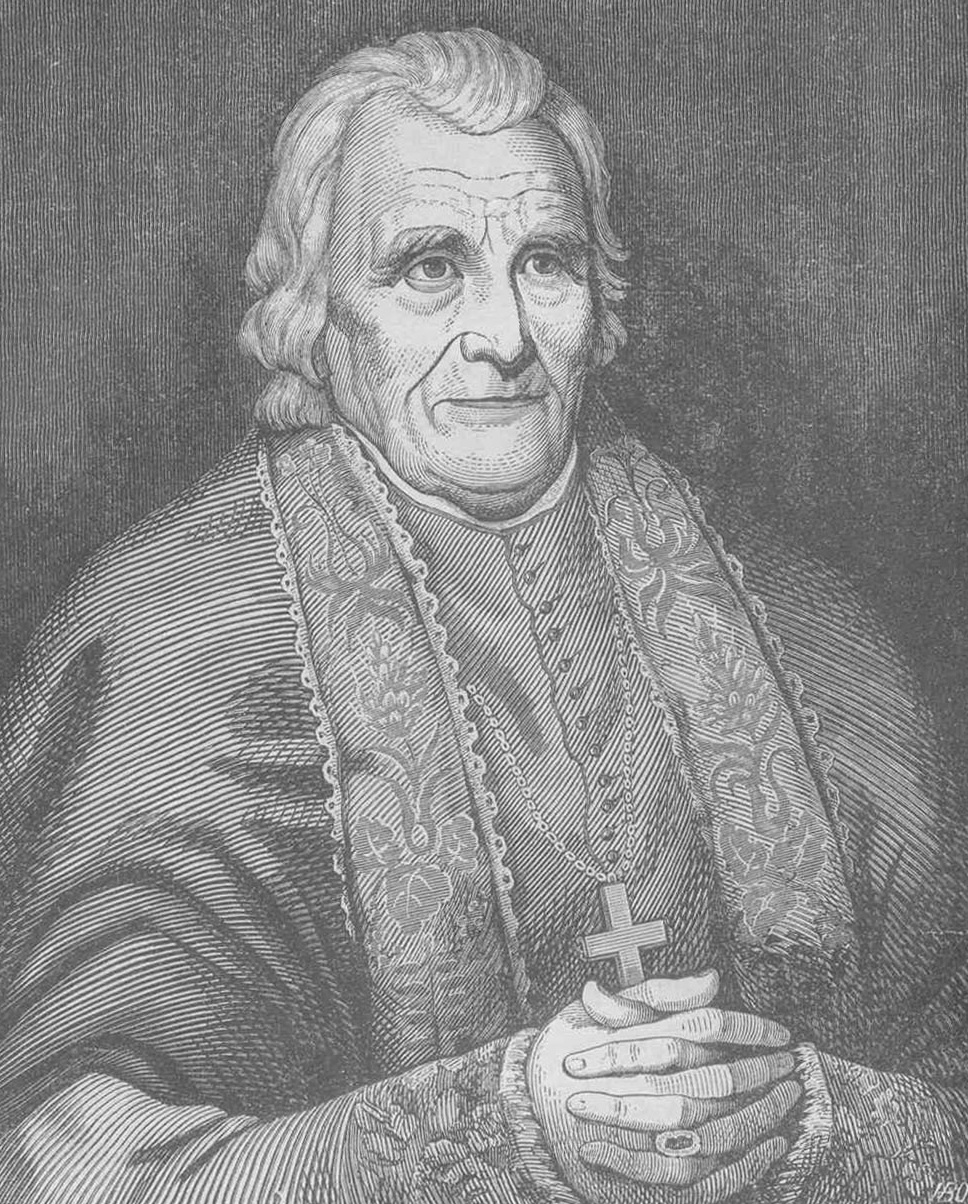
- Church: Latin Church
- See: Louisville
- In office: February 13, 1841 – February 11, 1850
- Successor: Martin John Spalding
- Previous post: Bishop of Bardstown (1808–1832; 1833–1841)

Orders
- Ordination: June 1, 1788
- Consecration: November 4, 1810 by John Carroll

Personal details
- Born: November 7, 1763 Contournat, Saint-Julien-de-Coppel, Auvergne, Kingdom of France
- Died: February 11, 1850 (aged 86) Louisville, Kentucky, United States

Benedict Joseph Flaget SS (November 7, 1763 – February 11, 1850) was a French-born Catholic prelate who served as Bishop of Bardstown from 1808 to 1839. When the see was transferred to Louisville in 1839, he became Bishop of Louisville, remaining in the post from 1839 to 1850. He was a member of the Sulpicians.

== Education and call to ministry ==
Flaget was born on November 7, 1763, in Contournat, now part of the commune of Saint-Julien-de-Coppel, in the ancient Province of Auvergne in the center of the Kingdom of France. Orphaned at an early age, he and his siblings were raised by his maternal aunt, assisted by his paternal uncle, a canon at the collegiate church of Billom. At the age of 17 he entered the Society of Saint-Sulpice at Clermont-Ferrand. He was ordained a priest on June 1, 1788. Flaget then taught theology for two years at the University of Nantes, and soon held the same post at the seminary at Angers, until those institutions were closed by the French Revolution.

== Early church work in America ==
In January 1792 Flaget sailed from Bordeaux, accompanied by fellow Sulpician John Baptist Mary David, and the then secular deacon Stephen Badin whose studies for the priesthood had been interrupted by the Revolution. They reached Philadelphia on March 26 and proceeded to Baltimore, arriving on March 29. After only two months in America, the Bishop of Baltimore, John Carroll, sent him to Fort Vincennes in the Indiana Territory to staff the Church of St. Francis Xavier, founded by Jesuit missionaries in 1748, before their Suppression and expulsion by British forces in 1763. There was a considerable number of French settlers and the mission which had gone without the presence of a resident priest for decades.

Flaget journeyed west in a wagon headed through the Allegheny Mountains to Fort Pitt, the area now known as Pittsburgh, Pennsylvania. A letter of introduction from Bishop Carroll provided an introduction to General "Mad" Anthony Wayne. Travel was to be by flatboat down the Ohio River, but due to low water conditions he stayed at Fort Pitt for a few months. While there he learned English and tended to those afflicted by an outbreak of smallpox in the area. Flaget left Pittsburgh in November and traveled down the Ohio River to the Falls of the Ohio (Louisville), where he continued on his journey to Fort Vincennes with George Rogers Clark. They reached the fort on December 21, 1792.

At Vincennes, in addition to his pastoral work, Flaget founded a school and library in the church (now the Old Cathedral and Library), the oldest educational institutions in Indiana. At Vincennes he ministered to the Catholics at the small parish. Here also he nursed the sick when in 1793 smallpox broke out among the settlers and the nearby Miami tribe. Flaget himself became ill, but recovered.

Flaget was recalled by his superiors to Baltimore and on April 23, 1795, traveled to Kaskaskia and then down the river to New Orleans and from there sailed to Baltimore. He taught geography and French at Georgetown College for the next three years. One of his students was the future bishop of Boston, Benedict Joseph Fenwick.

Flaget left Baltimore with two colleagues in 1798 bound for Cuba as part of a Sulpician mission to establish a college on that island. They were met with opposition from the local diocesan administrators, however, and were not able to celebrate Mass in Havana. During that stay, he contracted yellow fever and was left behind when the other Sulpicians decided to return to the United States. He recovered and acted as a tutor to the son of a wealthy Spaniard. Later, after the death of the Archbishop of Havana, the Dean of the Cathedral granted him permission to celebrate Mass at the church of the Capuchin friars. Flaget learned Spanish during his stay. While he was in Cuba, Louis Phillippe of France and his two brothers had arrived there on their journey in exile. The refugee aristocrats were befriended by their fellow Frenchman, Flaget, in 1800. This was a kindness which Louis Phillippe remembered and returned when he later ascended the throne of France as King.

Flaget returned to Baltimore in November 1801. He brought with him 23 young Spaniards whom he had recruited to study at Georgetown College. He then spent the next several years in various posts at that school.

In 1821 he started on a visitation of Tennessee, and bought property in Nashville for the first Catholic church. Flaget conducted the first Catholic mass in Nashville, Tennessee at the home of Revolutionary War Patriot and Commissioned Officer, Captain Timothy Demonbreun.

== Bishop ==
Flaget was appointed by the Holy See as the first Bishop of the newly established Diocese of Bardstown on April 8, 1808. The diocese comprised 8,137 square miles, an area now covering 10 modern states, including Kentucky, Ohio, Tennessee, Michigan, Indiana and others. Today this area includes 35 dioceses. Flaget, however, vigorously opposed the appointment and traveled to France in an effort to have it reversed. He was unsuccessful in this effort.

On his return trip to the United States, Flaget brought other early Sulpician missionaries to America: Simon Bruté, Guy Ignatius Chabrat, Anthony Deydier, James Derigaud and Julian Romeuf. The first two also became bishops in America. Upon his arrival, Flaget was consecrated a bishop by now-Archbishop Carroll on November 4, 1810 in a ceremony at the Baltimore Cathedral, now a basilica.

Upon taking office the following year, Flaget found himself charged with the pastoral care of the western frontier of the United States, having the assistance of seven priests and an estimated 25 enslaved African Americans.

In 1814, there being no Anglican clergyman in St. Louis, George Rogers Clark asked his old friend, Flaget, to baptize his three oldest children. Flaget went on to build St. Joseph Cathedral in Bardstown as the center of the diocese and a seminary to train the clergy needed to carry out the work of the diocese. He was one of only two bishops of Bardstown (along with John Baptist Mary David), though, since the diocese was removed to Louisville, Bardstown remained a titular see.

By 1817 Flaget was able to supply clergy to care for the French and Native American peoples living around the Great Lakes. He also began to establish parishes in Indiana and Michigan. In 1819 he proposed to the Sacred Congregation for the Propagation of the Faith (which oversaw the American Church as a missionary territory) the subdivision of his diocese. Eventually the diocese was subdivided, the first division becoming the Diocese of Cincinnati. Flaget was the principal consecrator of that new diocese's first bishop, Edward Dominic Fenwick, O.P. His counsel was also sought by the Congregation in international matters, such as resolving a dispute between the Canadian Sulpicians and the Archbishop of Quebec.

Flaget attended the First Provincial Council held by the American bishops in Baltimore to organize the Catholic Church as it was beginning to establish itself in the new nation. Worn out by this and his other labors, due to his poor health he submitted his resignation as bishop, which was accepted effective May 7, 1832. The outcry at this was so great from both the clergy and laity of the diocese, however, that he was appointed to that post again on March 17, 1833. The Bardstown Diocese was later transferred to Louisville, Kentucky on February 13, 1841, becoming the Diocese of Louisville.

During a cholera outbreak in 1833, Flaget's care for the afflicted of all classes and creeds elicited general admiration from the public. In 1834 he received a new coadjutor bishop in the person of Guy Ignatius Chabrat, S.S., whom Flaget himself had recruited from a Sulpician seminary in France in 1811 and then ordained. The following year, Flaget left for Europe, where he stayed until 1839. By the time of his departure, he had erected four colleges, a large female orphanage and infirmary, eleven academies for girls, and had introduced three congregations of Religious Sisters and four religious orders of men. After his return, he helped the Trappists to establish their first successful monastery in the nation in his diocese.

Chabret resigned as Coadjutor in 1847, and Flaget himself became confined to his bed for the last years of his life. He died February 11, 1850, and was buried two days later, after a Requiem Mass celebrated by his new Coadjutor Bishop, Martin John Spalding, with the sermon given by Bishop Purcell. He was buried in the undercroft of the Cathedral of the Assumption in Louisville, Kentucky.

== Legacy ==
Several institutions have been named for Benedict Joseph Flaget:

- Bishop Flaget School – Chillicothe, Ohio
- Flaget Memorial Hospital – Bardstown, Kentucky
- Flaget Elementary School – Vincennes, Indiana
- Flaget Center (Senior Center) – Louisville, Kentucky
- Flaget Community Center – Louisville, Kentucky
- Knights of Columbus, Flaget Council – Chillicothe, Ohio
- Bishop Flaget High School – Louisville, Kentucky (closed in 1974)

Catholic Church titles
Preceded by none	Bishop of Bardstown; 1808–1832	Succeeded by John Baptist Mary David
Preceded by John Baptist Mary David	Bishop of Bardstown; 1833–1841	Succeeded by none (transfer of See)
Preceded by none (transfer of See)	Bishop of Louisville; 1841–1850	Succeeded by Martin John Spalding
