= One by AOL =

Advertising company

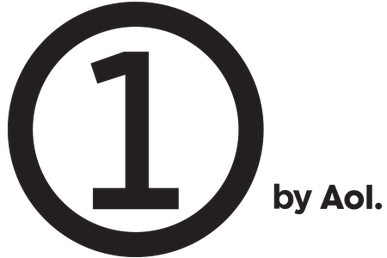
- Type: Subsidiary
- Industry: Mobile advertising & Monetization
- Defunct: September 10, 2018
- Headquarters: Baltimore, Maryland, USA
- Area served: Worldwide
- Key people: Tim Mahlman (President); Seth Demsey (CTO)
- Number of employees: 601 (January 23, 2014)
- Parent: AOL
- Website: www.onebyaol.com

One by AOL, formerly known as Millennial Media, was an advertising company that places display ads on mobile devices (mobile marketing).

== History ==
One by AOL was founded as Millennial Media in May 2006 by Paul Palmieri and Chris Brandenburg. The company received $64.8M in funding between 2007 and 2011 from venture capitalists, and went on to acquire several companies, including TapMetrics in 2010, Condaptive in 2011, Jumptap in 2013, and Nexage in 2014.

In January 2012, Millennial Media filed with the SEC for an initial public offering of its common stock, and the company was first listed in March 2012.

On January 27, 2014, Palmieri stepped down from his position and was replaced by Michael Barrett.

On September 3, 2015, AOL agreed to buy Millennial Media for US$238 million. On October 23, 2015, AOL completed the acquisition, and changed the name to ONE by AOL.

== Consolidation ==
On September 10, 2018, AOL's parent company Oath consolidated BrightRoll, One by AOL and Yahoo Gemini into a single advertising proposition dubbed Oath Ad Platforms.
