= Latin School of Indianapolis =

Coordinates: 39.7582°N 86.1484°W

Information
- Established: 1955
- Closed: 1978
- Enrollment: 80 (1972)

The Latin School of Indianapolis served from 1955 to 1978 as a pre-seminary boys' high school for the Roman Catholic Archdiocese of Indianapolis.

In its first two academic years, the Latin School operated as part of Cathedral High School, an all-boys Catholic high school founded in 1918. The first class had 24 boys enrolled. During those two years, the school was named the Cathedral Latin School.

In its third academic year, the Latin School moved into dedicated facilities, consisting of four classrooms attached to the Holy Rosary Church at 520 Stevens Street. The name was changed to Bishop Bruté Latin School after Simon Bruté, the first Bishop of the Diocese of Vincennes, which at the time included all of Indiana.

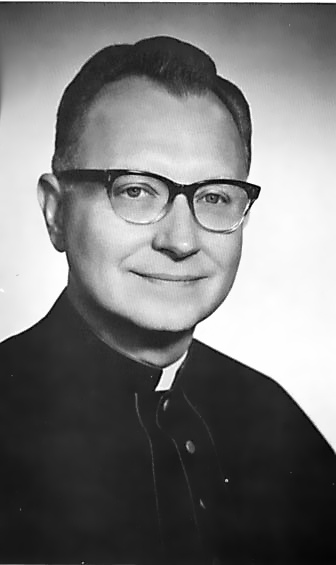
Msgr. Joseph D. Brokhage (1964)

Father Joseph D. Brokhage (S.T.D., ordained 1939, Monsignor 1964) served as both rector of the school and pastor of Holy Rosary parish. Under his leadership, the school grew steadily and added a large wing of classrooms, a recreation room and a gymnasium/auditorium along Stevens Street. An ambitious program was launched in 1963 to build a group of dormitories for out-of-town students. This plan was only partially carried out. The first dormitory, Dugan Hall, was built with funds provided by the Latin School Foundation, a foundation started by the District Council of Catholic Men. Dugan Hall was named for Msgr. Henry Dugan, who had been a member of the advisory board when the school was founded.

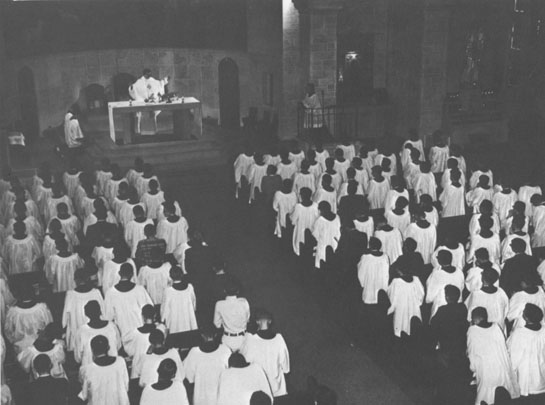
Students at Mass in Holy Rosary Church (1965). After that academic year, students wore the schoolday standard to church services: collared shirt, dresspants and tie.

== Academics ==
The concept of the Latin School originated with Brokhage, who modeled the school academically after the Boston Latin School, the oldest public school in America. The Indianapolis Latin School differed from the Boston school, because it prepared high school boys to enter seminary, principally the St. Meinrad Seminary and Benedictine Archabbey in southern Indiana.

The school attained a high degree of academic rigor and boasted a classical-style curriculum along with Church related subjects. For a period, Latin was a required course for all four years at Latin School. Greek was required during senior year until 1966. The majority of the instructors were priests from the Archdiocese, who taught in their areas of specialization.

== Closing ==
In 1978, the Archdiocese closed the school, because enrollment had decreased from 154 students in 1971 to 80 students in 1972. Sharply rising costs were another factor.

== Legacy ==
About 500 young men were graduated from Latin School since its founding and 86 were ordained as priests by the Archdiocese of Indianapolis. The former Latin School facility now houses Lumen Christi Catholic School, which was established in 2003.

== See also ==
- List of schools in Indianapolis
