= Stephen Badin =

First Catholic priest ordained in the United States (1768–1853)

The Reverend Stephen Theodore Badin
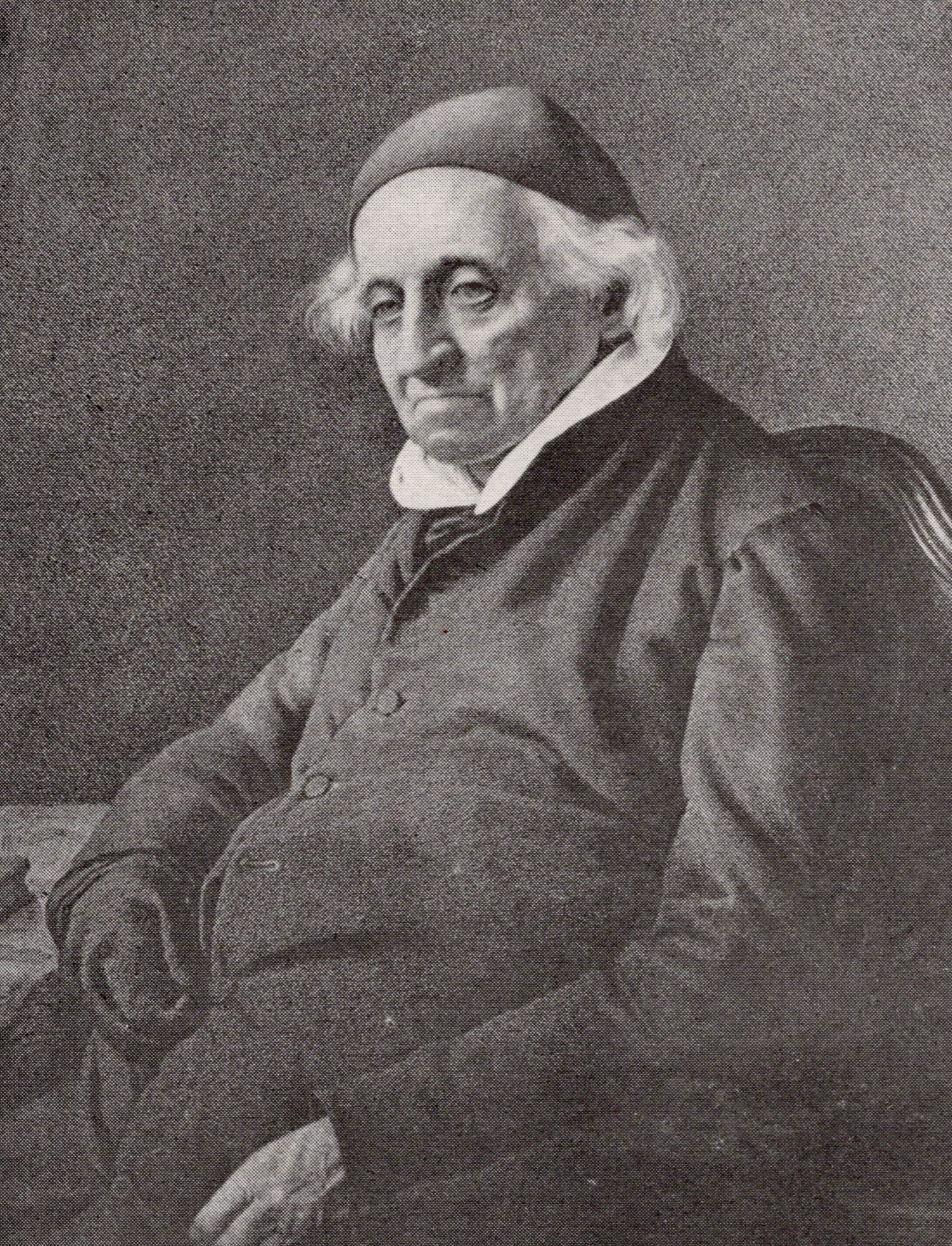
- Native name: Étienne Théodore Badin
- Church: Catholic
- Diocese: Baltimore

Orders
- Ordination: 25 May 1793 by John Carroll

Personal details
- Born: 17 July 1768 Orléans, France
- Died: 21 April 1853 (aged 84) Cincinnati, Ohio, U.S.

Stephen Theodore Badin (born Étienne Théodore Badin; 17 July 1768 – 21 April 1853) was a French-American Catholic priest who was the first ordained in the United States. He spent most of his long career ministering to widely dispersed Catholics in Canada and in what became the states of Kentucky, Ohio, Indiana, Michigan, and Illinois.

== Early life ==
Stephen Theodore Badin was born in Orléans, France on 17 July 1768. He was educated at the Collège de Montaigu in Paris and then began theological studies at the Sulpician seminary there. He was soon ordained a deacon. After the French Revolution in 1789, the new government started imposing restrictions on the Catholic Church. When his seminary was closed in 1791, Badin decided to leave France.

After sailing from Bordeaux, France, to Philadelphia with J. B. David and Reverend Benedict Flaget, P.S.S., he arrived in Baltimore. Badin completed his theological studies with the Sulpicians in that city and was ordained a priest by Bishop John Carroll on 25 May 1793. Badin then studied English with the Jesuits at what was then Georgetown College in Maryland. Much of his missionary work would be among Maryland Catholics creating settlements west of the Appalachian Mountains and French Catholics living in the Great Lakes region.

== Kentucky mission ==
Carroll then sent Fathers Badin and Michel Barriere to the new state of Kentucky. They set out on foot on 3 September 1793, about a year after Flaget moved to Kentucky. The two priests crossed the Appalachian Mountains, then took a flatboat down the Ohio River to Maysville, Kentucky. They then traveled by land to Lexington, Kentucky. Badin went on to White Sulfur Springs, Kentucky, where he established a mission named in honor of St. Francis de Sales. Later in 1793, Badin was assigned as pastor at Holy Cross Church which had been founded the previous year, in Loretto, Kentucky. To support Badin, his parishioners donated ten enslaved people for his use.

In April 1794, Badin established the home base for his missionary journeys on Pottinger's Creek, Kentucky, perhaps after consultation with Reverend Jean DuBois. For the next 14 years. Badin traveled on foot, horseback, and boat between widely scattered Catholic settlements in Kentucky and the Northwest Territory. One estimate puts his travels at over 100,000 miles. In 1806, he received help with the arrival of Reverend Charles Nerinckx. Carroll eventually named Badin as the vicar general of the regions.

In 1808, Pope Pius VII erected the Diocese of Bardstown, a huge diocese covering all of Kentucky and several future states in the Northwest Territory. The pope named Flaget as the first bishop of Bardstown. However, Flaget did not arrive in Bardstown for another three years. Badin and Flaget soon came into conflict over Badin's claims of ownership of church properties in the area. The two men travelled to Baltimore to consult with Carroll. The archbishop ruled in Flaget's favor.

== Return to France ==
Badin returned to France in 1819 for an unknown reason. He may have been upset over the land dispute or by the rise of anti-Catholicism in the region. His return may have been triggered by the eviction of Choctaw Indian Academy. While in France, Badin ministered to two parishes, Millaney and Marreilly-en-Gault near Orléans. He worked to secure gifts of money and church furniture to send to the Kentucky mission churches. In 1822, Badin published a "Statement of the Missions in Kentucky" (Etat des Missiones du Kentucky).

== Potawatomi mission ==
Badin returned to the United States by 1825 when he recorded his baptisms, marriages, and burials on Drummond Island, Michilimackinac, and Sault Ste Marie, continuing his missionary work in the Michigan Territory through 1828. He reestablished the St. Joseph Mission near present-day South Bend in the new state of Indiana. In 1829, Badin went back to Kentucky. In 1830, Badin offered his services to Bishop Edward Fenwick of the Archdiocese of Cincinnati, which oversaw missionary work with the Potawatomi Indians in the western Great Lakes area. Potawatomi Chief Leopold Pokagon, who had converted to Catholicism, traveled to Detroit in 1830 to ask for a priest to be sent to his tribe. Fenwick asked Badin, who was in Detroit visiting his brother, to accept Pokagon's request. In administering to the Potawatomi, Badin employed a translator as he considered himself too old to learn the Potawatomi language.

== Indiana and Illinois missions ==
In 1832, Badin purchased 524 acres (2.12 km^{2}) of land around South Bend, half from the government and half from two landowners. He then built a log chapel to serve as chapel and residence. Badin gave the land to the new Diocese of Vincennes in 1834 on the condition that it be used for a school and an orphanage. The land became the site of the University of Notre Dame. Badin also organized the first orphanage in the state of Indiana in 1834, under the direction of Sister Lucina Whitaker and Sister Magadalen Jackson from Kentucky. From his South Bend outpost, Badin visited Fort Dearborn in Illinois in October 1830, and possibly several other times (writing during an 1846 visit that such marked the fiftieth anniversary of his first visit).

In 1833, pursuant to a new treaty, the Potawatomi people moved west to Council Bluffs, Iowa. In 1836, given his advanced age, Badin decided to leave his Indian mission to his successor, Father Louis Desaille. Badin was named vicar of the Diocese of Bardstown in 1837. He continued missionary work as well as defended Catholicism, particularly in a series of "Letters to an Episcopalian Friend" published in the Catholic Telegraph of Cincinnati in 1836.

In September 1846, Badin accepted an offer by Bishop William Quarter of the new Diocese of Chicago to become pastor of the French settlement at Bourbonnais Grove, Illinois. Badin remained there for two years before taking one last missionary trip through the Kentucky diocese in 1848, which lasted about two years. He donated large tracts of land to the Diocese of Bardstown and its successor, the Diocese of Louisville, and wrote a poem in French about the Battle of Tippecanoe.

== Later years ==
Around 1850, Badin returned to Cincinnati to retire. Bishop John Purcell provided Badin a place at his residence. Badin also served at St. Mary's Church in nearby Hamilton, Ohio.

Badin died in Cincinnati on 21 April 1853 and was buried at the cathedral crypt in Cincinnati. In 1906, his body was re-interred at the University of Notre Dame in a replica of Badin's Log Chapel. The original chapel was destroyed by fire in 1856.

== Legacy ==
Father Stephen T. Badin High School, a Catholic high school in Hamilton, Ohio, was named in his honor. There is a Badin Hall on the Notre Dame campus.
