= Anthony Deydier =

Anthony Deydier, was a French priest, missionary and teacher.

== Biography ==
=== Early years in America ===
Deydier was born in France on April 30, 1788. He left his native country on June 10, 1810, on the same boat as Simon Bruté, accompanying Benedict Flaget. After his ordination to the diaconate he refused ordination to the priesthood and he taught for four years at Mount St. Mary's in Emmitsburg, Maryland, (which was where Father Bruté spent most of his early years in America), eventually ending up in Albany New York as a private tutor. According to one source, he had received minor orders in France and when he arrived in the United States, he taught music in New York City. Apparently his association with Brute at Mount St. Mary's is what led him eventually to his priestly ordination. Bruté reportedly asked him to come to Indiana. That call obviously struck a chord in Deydier because it was in the missions that he spent the remainder of his life. Bishop Bruté ordained him on March 25, 1837, in the Cathedral of Saint Francis Xavier in Vincennes, Indiana.

=== Missionary work in Indiana ===
After his ordination as a priest he was sent to Evansville, Indiana. He apparently did not find many Catholics. The day after his arrival, on May 4, 1837, he celebrated Mass in a tavern, at the corner of First and Locust. He then returned to Vincennes, but was then sent back to Evansville in November 1838, after conducting a collection tour in September of that year. From then on he is reported to have remained in Evansville. However, it was reported in Historical Records and Studies that in 1842, while on a similar mission trip, Deydier was appointed temporary administrator of the new French Parish in New York City, St. Vincent DePaul. Much of his time was taken up ministering to the workers on the Wabash and Erie Canal. Deydier's life in Evansville was not one of leisure. Saint Theodora Guerin, foundress of the Sisters of Providence, St. Mary of the Woods wrote in her journal "So extreme was his poverty and so complete his destitution, that I shall run the risk of being accused of exaggeration in describing it." He founded the parish of the Assumption in Evansville, Vanderburgh County, Indiana. In the "History of Vanderburgh County" it was written:

It was a noticeable feature of the Catholic priesthood in the pioneer days that wherever they found a community, no matter how small or how widely scattered, wherein they could establish a mission, there the cross was erected and the protecting care of the church spread over the inhabitants. No hardship was accounted too severe and no sacrifice too great to stand in the way of the propagation of a religion which they believed to declare the voice and will of God. The first information of any Catholics residing in the vicinity of Evansville, was communicated in the fall of 1836, to the Right Rev. Gabriel Brute, first bishop of Vincennes, by Rev. Father Buteux, and the companions of his journey, who lodged on their arrival here, at the Mansion House, then kept by Francis Linck, a citizen well remembered to this day and esteemed by all the older inhabitants of the city. Mr. Linck, born in 1774, was a native of Stockheim, in Wurtemburg, and in 1836 was the only Catholic in Evansville, except perhaps the late John Walsh. In March, 1837, Very Rev. Father De la Hielandiere, vicar-general of the Rev. Bishop, accompanied by Rev. Father Shawe, visited Evansville with a view of establishing a mission, and on the 3rd day of May, following, Rev. Father Anthony Deydier was dispatched to take charge of the mission. Father Deydier was born in France, April 30, 1788, and was ordained a priest at the cathedral of Vincennes, March 25, 1837. Very few knew that he had reached the full strength of his manhood when he took upon himself holy orders, and was placed in charge of the mission in this city. While here he lived a blameless and well spent life, unobtrusive in his deportment, but with a kind word for all. After almost a year's residence at the house of Mr. Linck, in January, 1838, he built a lodge room, 10x15 feet size, at the corner of Fifth and Chestnut streets. Here he made his abode, using his little room as a dwelling and for chapel purposes for about three years. For Sabbath day services larger rooms at the homes of Catholics were occasionally used. He labored heroically among his people, did much missionary work in the country adjacent to Evansville, and in 1838 made a successful trip to the east to raise funds for the erection of a church building. The history of Catholicism in Evansville since that time is the history of a wonderful growth. The worthy priest who stood by the church in its infancy, lived to see it become rich and powerful with a numerous priesthood within the territory where he once labored alone - lived to see a sturdy oak grown from the acorn planted by his hands. When old age and increasing infirmities had impaired his usefulness, he retired from the active ministry and, returning to Vincennes, passed the evening of his life in comparative rest, greatly beloved by all who knew him. His death occurred February 11, 1864.

Deydier remained until 1859, when he retired to the "Highlands" at Vincennes.

He died on February 11, 1864, and was buried in the orphanage cemetery, which is now part of the St. Vincent de Paul Parish. In 2016, the parish was merged into St. Francis Xavier Parish.
