= William Leo Higi =

American Roman Catholic prelate (1933–2025)

His Excellency, The Most Reverend William Leo Higi
- Bishop of Lafayette in Indiana
- Archdiocese: Indianapolis
- Diocese: Lafayette in Indiana
- Appointed: April 7, 1984
- Installed: June 6, 1984
- Retired: May 12, 2010
- Predecessor: George Avis Fulcher
- Successor: Timothy Doherty

Orders
- Ordination: May 30, 1959 by John Joseph Carberry
- Consecration: June 6, 1984 by Edward O'Meara, Raymond Joseph Gallagher, and Joseph Robert Crowley

Personal details
- Born: August 29, 1933 Anderson, Indiana, U.S.
- Died: January 3, 2025 (aged 91) Lafayette, Indiana, U.S.
- Motto: Praised be Jesus Christ

Styles of William Leo Higi
- Reference style: His Excellency; The Most Reverend
- Spoken style: Your Excellency
- Religious style: Bishop

William Leo Higi (August 29, 1933 – January 3, 2025) was an American prelate of the Roman Catholic Church. He served as bishop of the Diocese of Lafayette in Indiana from 1984 to 2010.

== Biography ==
=== Early years ===
William Higi was born in Anderson, Indiana, on August 29, 1933. While a high school junior, he became a seminarian for the Diocese of Indianapolis.

On May 30, 1959, Higi was ordained into the priesthood by Cardinal John Carberry for the Diocese of Lafayette in Indiana at the Cathedral of St. Mary of the Immaculate Conception in Lafayette, Indiana. He was appointed secretary to Carberry on August 13, 1962, vice-chancellor of the diocese on January 14, 1965, and chancellor on June 16, 1967. Pope Paul VI named Higi a prelate of honor on November 16, 1976. Appointed vicar general of the diocese on June 29, 1979, Higi was appointed diocesan administrator on January 26, 1984, upon the death of Bishop George A. Fulcher.

=== Bishop of Lafayette in Indiana ===
On April 7, 1984, Pope John Paul II appointed Higi as bishop of Lafayette in Indiana. He was consecrated by Archbishop Edward O’Meara on June 6, 1984. During Higi's tenure, he dedicated several new churches and opened St. Theodore Guerin High School in Noblesville, Indiana. Higi also did outreach to Haiti on several trips there.

On December 31, 2003, Higi reported that 18 priests serving in the diocese since 1950 had been accused by 26 parishioners of sexually abusing them as minors. Nine priests were removed from ministry due to credible accusations.

=== Retirement ===
On May 12, 2010, Pope Benedict XVI accepted Higi's letter of resignation as bishop of Lafayette, required when a bishop reaches age 75. The pope replaced him with Monsignor Timothy Doherty. Higi died on January 3, 2025, in Lafayette at the age of 91.

== See also ==
- Catholic Church hierarchy
- Catholic Church in the United States
- Historical list of the Catholic bishops of the United States
- List of Catholic bishops of the United States
- Lists of patriarchs, archbishops, and bishops

== Episcopal succession ==
Catholic Church titles
Preceded by George Avis Fulcher	Bishop of Lafayette in Indiana; 1984–2010	Succeeded by Timothy Doherty
