= Sebastian Menke =

American Catholic priest and academic administrator (1910–2002)

Sebastian G. Menke (December 21, 1910 – April 21, 2002) was an American Catholic priest and academic administrator, who served as the tenth president of St. Ambrose College in Davenport, Iowa from 1964 to 1973.

== Biography ==
=== Early life and education ===
Menke was born on December 21, 1910, in St. Paul, Iowa. He graduated from St. Ambrose in 1934, and was ordained a priest for the Diocese of Davenport in St. Paul in 1938.

=== St. Ambrose College ===
Menke returned to St. Ambrose and taught Latin, German, Greek, ancient history and astronomy on campus. He then became rector for East Hall (Rohlman Hall). While he studied for his doctorate at the University of Iowa he served as chaplain at Mercy Hospital in Iowa City. Menke served as president during a time when struggles were high for private colleges. The Vietnam War was raging and there were protests against the war on campus. Edward Rogalski, who would eventually serve as the college's president, remembers, "He did a lot to help defuse the emotions. We would meet with students at any time of day and night. He even led a protest march here in Davenport — and that was a time when emotions were running very high". In 1964, he was named a Monsignor by Pope Paul VI, upon the nomination of Bishop Ralph Hayes. From 1970 to 1973, St. Ambrose and Marycrest College planned for a merger. They even chose a new name for the school, Newman College, before the effort was discontinued and both schools went their own way. During his presidency, South Hall (Cosgrove Hall), Hayes Hall, and Galvin Fine Arts Center were all constructed.

=== Sacred Heart Cathedral ===
After leaving the presidency Menke became the pastor and rector of Sacred Heart Cathedral. He served as a chairperson for one of the commissions during the diocesan synod in 1974. Menke also chaired a board that was working on the consolidation of St. Luke's and Mercy Hospitals in Davenport. Like the merger of the two colleges, the hospital merger did not happen either. He was involved in establishing the United Way of the Quad-Cities Area. El Centro Cultural Hispano, an organization that cared for the needs of the Spanish-speaking people of the Quad City area, was established at Sacred Heart in 1975. Two years later Mass in Spanish was added to the cathedral schedule. Menke was instrumental in establishing a food pantry and a clothing center at the cathedral. He helped out at the Catholic Worker House and the East Side Development Center. He was involved with other social service agencies and racial matters.

=== Later life and death ===
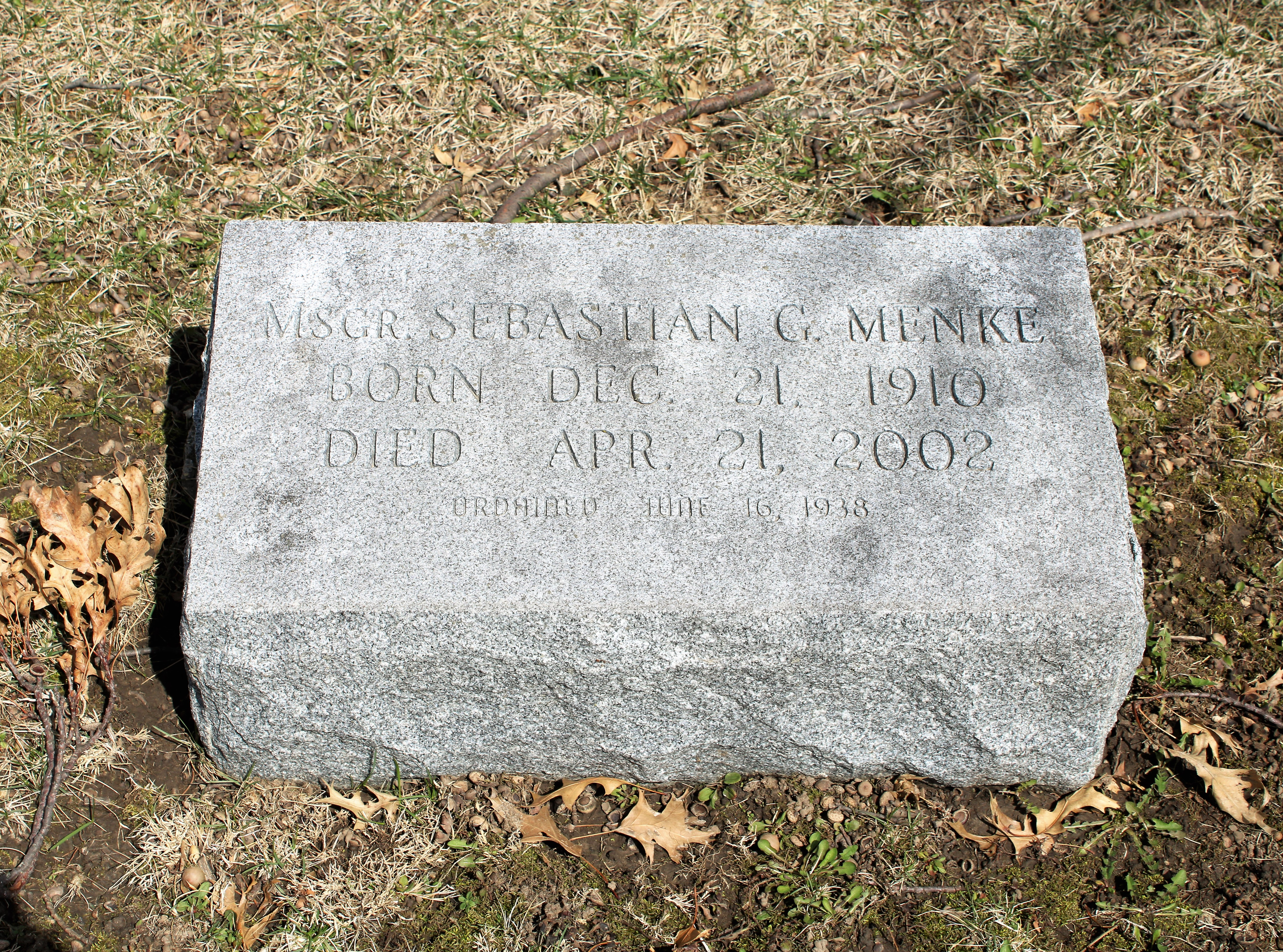
Menke's grave in Mount Calvary Cemetery

In 1985, Menke retired as the cathedral rector and took up residence at St. Mary's Church in Iowa City. At the end of 1991 he left Iowa City and retired to St. Vincent Center in Davenport. He died on April 21, 2002, aged 91. Memorial Masses were held at Christ the King Chapel at St. Ambrose and Sacred Heart Cathedral. He donated his body to the Department of Anatomy at the University of Iowa, which was later buried in the Priests' Circle of Mount Calvary Cemetery in Davenport.

== Legacy ==
The Menke Observatory is an astronomical observatory owned and operated by St. Ambrose University. It was named in honor of Menke.

Academic offices
Preceded by William J. Collins	President of St. Ambrose University; 1964–1973	Succeeded by William J. Bakrow
