= Roman Catholic Diocese of Lafayette =

Roman Catholic Diocese of Lafayette may refer to the following Roman Catholic dioceses in the United States:

- Roman Catholic Diocese of Lafayette in Louisiana
- Roman Catholic Diocese of Lafayette in Indiana
