= William Bakrow =

American academic

William J. Bakrow
- Born: April 22, 1923; Rochester, New York, United States
- Died: March 17, 2005 (aged 81); Rockport, Massachusetts, United States
- Education: Brown University, Indiana University Bloomington
- Occupations: Educator, College President
- Known for: 11th President of St. Ambrose College
- Spouse: Maree (Walsh) Bakrow
- Children: 3
- Parent(s): Leonard Bakrow, Edith (Adler) Bakrow

William J. Bakrow (April 22, 1923 – March 17, 2005) was the 11th president of St. Ambrose College in Davenport, Iowa, from 1973 to 1987.

== Early life and education ==
Bakrow was born in Rochester, New York, to Leonard and Edith (Adler) Bakrow. He was educated at Harley High School in Rochester. He earned his bachelor's degree from Brown University in Providence, Rhode Island, and his doctorate in education from Indiana University Bloomington, Indiana. During World War II he served in the United States Army. After the war he worked as a correspondent for United Press in the Philippines. He married Maree (Walsh) Bakrow and they had three children.

== Career ==
Bakrow helped establish the Motorola Executive Institute in Tucson, Arizona, in 1964, where he served as its executive director until 1973. In June of the same year he was named the first lay person to serve as president of St. Ambrose College.

During his 15 years at St. Ambrose, he was referred to as "Dollar Bill," as he wiped out the schools $2 million debt, doubled enrollment, and balanced the budget for eight consecutive years. During his presidency, St. Ambrose began graduate studies with the Master of Business Administration program. At the end of his term as president St. Ambrose College became St. Ambrose University.

== Later life and death ==
When he retired from St. Ambrose in 1987, he moved to Rockport, Massachusetts. He spent a year as the interim president of Montserrat College of Art, and served on the Rockport Finance Committee and Planning Board. He died in Rockport on March 17, 2005, at the age of 81. His funeral was held in St. Joachim's Church and he was buried in Beech Grove Cemetery, both in Rockport.

Academic offices
Preceded by Sebastian Menke	President of St. Ambrose University; 1973–1987	Succeeded by Edward Rogalski
