= Marian Catholic High School (Illinois) =

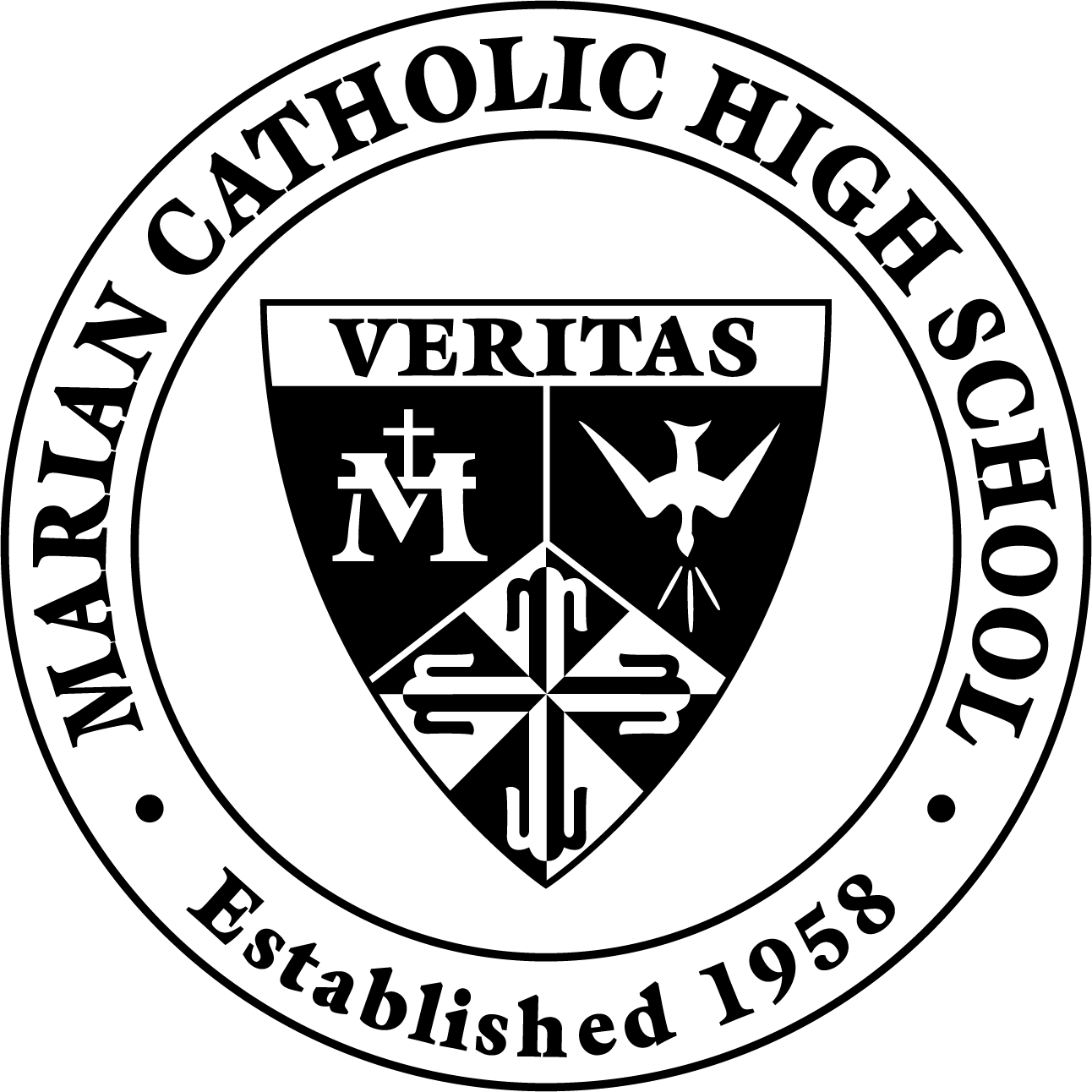

Location
- 700 Ashland Avenue; Chicago Heights, Illinois 60411-2073; United States; 41°31′11″N 87°39′23″W

Information
- Type: Private, Coeducational
- Motto: Veritas (Truth)
- Religious affiliation: Roman Catholic
- Established: 1958
- Status: open
- Oversight: Archdiocese of Chicago
- President: Vince Krydynski
- Principal: Joe Zampillo
- Teaching staff: 83
- Grades: 9–12
- Enrollment: 784 (2023)
- Average class size: 24
- Student to teacher ratio: 13:1
- Campus: suburban
- Campus size: 72 acres (290,000 m^{2})
- Colors: Black, white and gold
- Athletics conference: Chicago Catholic League, Girls Catholic Athletic Conference
- Mascot: Sparty
- Team name: Spartans
- Accreditation: North Central Association of Colleges and Schools
- Newspaper: The Spartan Star
- Yearbook: The Mariner
- Tuition: US$16,100(2026-27)
- Affiliation: Dominican Sisters of Springfield
- Website: www.marianchs.com

Marian Catholic High School is a co-educational secondary school in Chicago Heights, Illinois. It is located in the Roman Catholic Archdiocese of Chicago.

== History ==
In 1949, after making a request to Samuel Stritch, Cardinal Archbishop of Chicago, a priest at St. Agnes parish in Chicago Heights was given permission to purchase land and begin raising funds for the construction of a coed high school. By 1951 enough capital had been raised to hire a local architect to design the building. The Cardinal then mandated that there were to be two cooperative schools, one for women and one for men, each to be run by a religious order. The new plan called for the first school to accept coed classes until the boys' school was ready, about four years after the school for women was open.

The Dominican Sisters of Springfield, Illinois agreed to oversee and staff the new school in 1955. Ground breaking occurred on January 6, 1957, and the school opened in September, 1958. The school was dedicated by Cardinal Albert Gregory Meyer on January 11, 1959.

In September 1961, the first group of seniors preparing to graduate stood at 165, but the incoming freshman class was 450. The initial staff of six nuns was now at 18, and had outgrown the capacity of their convent in nearby Homewood. The Dominican Sisters added a new convent to the school to accommodate the growing staff. Without a male religious order to sponsor the male school, plans were eventually dropped to build the second school. Mobile classrooms were brought in to help with the overcrowding.

In 1970, the Sisters and the Archdiocese reached an agreement that would leave the sisters as the sole sponsors of the school, while the Archdiocese committed more money to build an addition. While the Archdiocese did not cover all of the needed additions, over the intervening years the school continued to raise money and make needed additions and renovations.

The school received some criticism over tuition payment issues in March 2009, with an article appearing in the Chicago Tribune and various local media outlets. One hundred students who were late on their fees, causing a $450,000 budget deficit, were temporarily sent home from the school. Most quickly returned to class after working out payment plans. The Chicago Tribune was charged with bad reporting by many parents, who felt that many vital facts were not accurately represented in the initial article.

== Athletics ==
Marian Catholic is a member of the Chicago Catholic League and Girls Catholic Athletic Conference and participates in state tournaments sponsored by the Illinois High School Association.

The school sponsors interscholastic sports teams for both men and women in basketball, cross country, golf, soccer, tennis, track and field, and volleyball. The school sponsors baseball, football, and wrestling for men, while sponsoring cheerleading and softball for women.

While not sponsored by the IHSA, Marian Catholic also sponsors interscholastic teams for men and women in fencing. The fencing teams compete as a part of the Great Lakes High School Fencing Conference.

The following teams have placed in the top four of their respective state tournament sponsored by the IHSA:

- Football •• State semifinalist (1981, 1986); 2nd place (1999—2000); State Champion (1993—94)
- Men's Basketball •• 3rd place (2018)
- Women's Basketball •• 4th place (2003—04); 3rd place (2006—07); 2nd place (2001—02), State Champion (2012—13); 3rd place (2013—14)
- Women's Golf •• 4th place (2006—07); 3rd place (2007—08); 2nd place (2005—06)
- Softball •• 4th place (1986—87); 3rd place (1984—85)
- Women's Volleyball •• 4th place (2011); State Champion (2016)
- Baseball •• 2nd place (2017); State Champion (2012)

== Band program ==
The Marian Catholic Band has been awarded both the Sudler Shield (1997), "an international award recognizing high school, youth, and international marching bands of world class excellence", and the Sudler Flag of Honor (1991), another international award given for outstanding concert performance from the John Philip Sousa Foundation.

The Marian Catholic Band has won seven Bands of America Grand National Championships, 23 National Class Championships, and five Bands of America Summer National Championships, the most of any band, as well as holding the record for most total and consecutive National Finals appearances, at 34. The band has won its class in the Illinois State Marching Band competition every season since 1980, a 40-year streak unmatched by any other Illinois High School Association program (band or otherwise). The band also holds 18 Illinois State Grand Champion trophies.

== Notable alumni and faculty ==
=== Alumni ===
- Colin Egglesfield (class of 1991) is a professional actor, best known for playing Joshua Madden on the soap opera All My Children.
- Rodney Harrison (class of 1991) is a former NFL defensive back who played for the San Diego Chargers and New England Patriots (Super Bowl XXXVIII and XXXIX).
- John Holecek (class of 1990) is a former NFL linebacker who played eight seasons for the Buffalo Bills, San Diego Chargers, and Atlanta Falcons.
- Dennis Kelly (class of 2008) is an offensive lineman currently with the NFL's Indianapolis Colts, and formerly with the Philadelphia Eagles, Tennessee Titans, and Green Bay Packers.
- Tim Kelly (class of 2004) is the Tight Ends Coach for the NFL's New York Giants. Kelly formerly held multiple offensive coaching positions with both the Tennessee Titans and Houston Texans.
- Mike Prior (class of 1981) is a former NFL defensive back who played for the Tampa Bay Buccaneers, Indianapolis Colts, and Green Bay Packers.
- Shonda Rhimes (class of 1987) is the creator of the TV shows Grey's Anatomy, Private Practice, How to Get Away With Murder, and Scandal.
- Brian Timpone (class of 1991) is a conservative businessman and former CBS television journalist turned Internet news entrepreneur.
- Jaboukie Young-White (class of 2012) is a comedian, actor, writer and musician. Former Senior Youth Correspondent (2018-21) on The Daily Show.

=== Faculty ===
- James Conroyd Martin (now retired) is the author of Push not the River and its sequel Against a Crimson Sky.
