= William J. Collins =

Catholic priest from Davenport, Iowa (1896–1981)

Rt. Rev. Msgr. William J. Collins
- Born: 1896; Millersburg, Iowa, USA
- Died: 1981 (aged 84–85); Davenport, Iowa, USA
- Known for: President of St. Ambrose College, Davenport, Iowa

William J. Collins (1896–1981) was a 20th-century Catholic priest who served as the ninth president of St. Ambrose College in Davenport, Iowa from 1956 to 1963.

== Biography ==
He was born and raised in Millersburg, Iowa and was educated at St. Ambrose College. He was ordained a priest for the Diocese of Davenport at Sacred Heart Cathedral in 1929.

He was referred to as "Sailor Bill" since he had served in the Navy. He was assigned to the faculty of St. Ambrose College and served as chairman of the business and economics departments on campus before becoming president. From 1953 to 1959 he was the moderator of the Te Deum, a lecture program that provided adult education in the diocese. He was named the president of St. Ambrose in 1956, the same year that Pope Pius XII named him a Domestic Prelate upon the nomination of Bishop Ralph Hayes. Hoping to get the school back on track financially, Collins raised tuition and temporarily dropped the football program. During his term, East Hall (Rohlman Hall) was constructed. Collins was active in the American Legion and helped found the Council of World Affairs. After he served as president of the college he was assigned as the chaplain at the Kahl Home for the Aged and Infirmed in Davenport.

Academic offices
Preceded by Ambrose Burke	President of St. Ambrose University; 1956–1963	Succeeded by Sebastian Menke
