= Menke Observatory =

Astronomical observatory in Iowa, US

- Organization: St. Ambrose University
- Location: Dixon, Iowa (USA)
- Coordinates: 41°46′19″N 90°47′39.5″W
- Website: web.sau.edu/astronomy/menke/

Menke Observatory is an astronomical observatory owned and operated by St. Ambrose University. It is located northwest of Dixon, Iowa (USA) on the southern bank of the Wapsipinicon River. It is named after the former President of St. Ambrose, Monsignor Sebastian Menke, and moved to it current location in 1994.

== See also ==
- List of astronomical observatories
