= John Carberry =

American prelate (1904–1998)

His Eminence John Joseph Carberry
- Cardinal, Archbishop of St. Louis
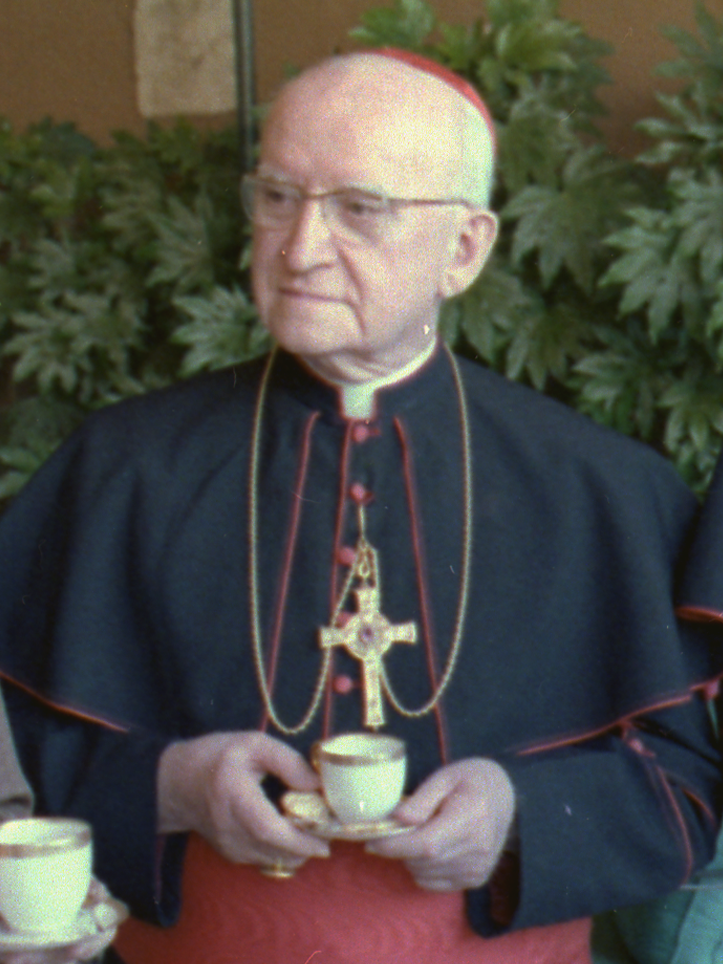
- Cardinal Carberry in 1978
- See: St. Louis
- Appointed: February 17, 1968
- Installed: March 25, 1968
- Term ended: July 31, 1979
- Predecessor: Joseph Ritter
- Successor: John L. May
- Other post: Cardinal-Priest of San Giovanni Battista de’ Rossi
- Previous posts: Bishop of Columbus (1965-1968); Bishop of Lafayette in Indiana (1957-1965); Coadjutor Bishop of Lafayette in Indiana (1956-1957)

Orders
- Ordination: July 28, 1929 by Francesco Marchetti Selvaggiani
- Consecration: July 25, 1956 by Raymond Augustine Kearney
- Created cardinal: April 28, 1969 by Paul VI
- Rank: Cardinal-Priest

Personal details
- Born: July 31, 1904 Brooklyn, New York, US
- Died: June 17, 1998 (aged 93) St Louis, Missouri, US
- Motto: Maria regina mater (Mary Queen Mother)

Styles of John Joseph Carberry
- Reference style: His Eminence
- Spoken style: Your Eminence
- Informal style: Cardinal
- See: St. Louis

John Joseph Carberry (July 31, 1904 – June 17, 1998) was an American Catholic prelate who served as Archbishop of St. Louis from 1968 to 1979. He was created a cardinal in 1969. He served as Bishop of Lafayette in Indiana from 1957 to 1965 and Bishop of Columbus from 1965 to 1968. During his term as an archbishop, Carberry was a strong advocate for ecumenicism and racial equality.

== Biography ==
=== Early life and education ===
John Joseph Carberry was born in Brooklyn, New York, the youngest of ten children of James Joseph and Mary Elizabeth (née O'Keefe) Carberry. His father worked as a clerk at Kings County Court. He received his early education at the parochial school of St. Boniface Parish in Brooklyn. In 1919, at age 15, he enrolled at Cathedral College of the Immaculate Conception, a minor (high school) seminary in Queens. He excelled in both baseball and the violin at the college.

From 1924 to 1930, Carberry studied for the priesthood in Rome, where he resided at the Pontifical North American College. He earned a Doctor of Philosophy degree (1929) and a Doctor of Theology degree (1930) from the Pontifical Urbaniana University.

=== Ordination and ministry ===
On June 28, 1929, Carberry was ordained a priest for the Diocese of Brooklyn by Cardinal Francesco Selvaggiani in Rome. Following his return to New York, Carberry was assigned as a curate at St. Peter's Parish in Glen Cove, where he remained for one year. He continued his studies at the Catholic University of America in Washington, D.C., where he received a Doctor of Canon Law degree in 1934. Carberry then served as a curate at St. Patrick's Parish in Huntington, New York, for one year.

From 1935 to 1940, Carberry was on loan to the Diocese of Trenton in New Jersey, serving as secretary to Bishop Moses E. Kiley and assistant chancellor of the diocese. He also taught at Trenton Cathedral High School in Trenton, New Jersey, from 1939 to 1940. Returning to New York, Carberry taught at St. Dominic High School in Oyster Bay, New York, before serving as professor of canon law at Seminary of the Immaculate Conception in Huntington, New York, from 1941 to 1945.

Carberry was an officialis of the Diocese of Brooklyn from 1945 to 1956, serving as chief judge of the diocesan court. He also served as diocesan director for radio and television, becoming known as the "radio priest." The Vatican elevated Carberry to the rank of papal chamberlain in 1948 and domestic prelate in 1954. From 1955 to 1956, Carberry served as president of the Canon Law Society of America.

=== Bishop of Lafayette in Indiana ===
On May 3, 1956, Carberry was appointed coadjutor bishop of Lafayette in Indiana and titular bishop of Elis by Pope Pius XII. He received his episcopal consecration on July 25, 1956, from Bishop Raymond Kearney, with Bishops George W. Ahr and John Benjamin Grellinger serving as co-consecrators, at the Our Lady of Perpetual Help Church In Brooklyn Carberry selected as his episcopal motto: Maria, Regina Mater (Latin: "Mary, Queen and Mother"). His installation took place at the Cathedral of St. Mary of the Immaculate Conception in Lafayette, Indiana, on August 22, 1956 .

Upon the death of Bishop John Bennett, Carberry automatically succeeded him as the second bishop of Lafayette on November 20, 1957. He convened the first diocesan synod and established the Diocesan Council of Men and the Society for Priestly Vocations during his tenure. Carberry attended all four sessions of the Second Vatican Council in Rome between 1962 and 1965. During its third session, he addressed the Council on Dignitatis humanae, the declaration on religious liberty.

=== Bishop of Columbus ===
Carberry was appointed the seventh bishop of Columbus by Pope Paul VI on January 16, 1965. He was installed at St. Joseph's Cathedral in Columbus, Ohio, on March 25, 1965. During his tenure in Columbus, he implemented the reforms of the Second Vatican Council and supported the American Civil Rights Movement and ecumenical movement. He established the Clergy Advisory Council, and oversaw the renovation of St. Joseph's Cathedral after issuing regulations for liturgical changes. Carberry also bought a new building to centralize the offices of the diocesan chancery. In 1966, he was named by Cardinal Francis Spellman as vicar delegate of the Military Ordinariate for Ohio, West Virginia, Kentucky, Tennessee, Mississippi, and Alabama.

As a member of the National Conference of Catholic Bishops, Carberry served as chair of the Committee on Ecumenical and Interreligious Affairs from 1965 to 1969. He helped found the Inter-Church Board for Metropolitan Affairs, the first organization in the United States uniting Protestants and Catholics for ecumenism and social action. In 1968, he became the first Catholic bishop to receive the Ohio Council of Churches' annual "Pastor of Pastors" award. That same year, Carberry received a letter from the American Jewish Congress protesting what they claimed was "anti-Semitic language and imagery" in a Catholic passion play staged each year by a parish in Union City, New Jersey. Carberry passed the complaints to Archbishop Thomas Boland, who then directed the parish to make changes in line with the American Jewish Congress' demands.

=== Archbishop of St. Louis ===
On February 14, 1968, Carberry was appointed the fifth archbishop of St. Louis. His installation took place at the Cathedral of St. Louis in St. Louis, Missouri, on March 25, 1968. Carberry was considered more theologically conservative than his predecessor, Cardinal Joseph Ritter. Time Magazine described Carberry as being "threatened by a world he does not understand." Carberry strongly defended the 1968 encyclical Humanae vitae, and created the Archdiocesan Pro-Life Commission.

Paul VI created Carberry a cardinal priest of S. Giovanni Battista de Rossi a via Latina in the consistory of April 28, 1969. In 1969, Carberry removed about 60 of his seminarians from a class at the Saint Louis University Divinity School, objecting to their being taught Pauls' epistles by the Presbyterian scholar Keith Nickle.

In 1971, Carberry made a controversial decision to close McBride High school in the largely black North St. Louis area, while subsidizing a swimming pool at John F. Kennedy High School in Manchester, Missouri, a wealthy suburb. Carberry moved his own residence from the episcopal residence in St. Louis to suburban Creve Coeur, Missouri. In 1972, Carberry established the Urban Services Apostolate for inner-city parishes in the archdiocese. He was elected vice-president of the National Conference of Catholic Bishops in 1974, and was a delegate to the World Synod of Bishops in 1972, 1974 and 1976. Carberry initially opposed the reception of communion by hand, believing it was irreverent and risked the possibility of recipients stealing hosts to use at black masses. However, he later permitted this practice in St. Louis in 1977. That same year, he ordained the first permanent deacons in the archdiocese.

Carberry was a cardinal electors who participated in the conclaves of August and October 1978, which selected Popes John Paul I and John Paul II, respectively. Carberry helped lead an internal campaign against the liberal Archbishop Jean Jadot, the apostolic delegate to the United States, whom he perceived as "destroying the Catholic Church in the United States." Carberry was a vocal critic of the television comedy Maude, which he said

"injected CBS-TV as advocate of a moral and political position that many not only oppose but find positively offensive as immoral. ...The decision to secure an abortion or the decision to have a vasectomy, even for those who choose them, is hardly a joke."

=== Later life and death ===
Upon reaching the mandatory retirement age of 75 for bishops, Carberry resigned as archbishop of St. Louis on July 31, 1979. He was succeeded by Bishop John L. May,. After suffering a stroke in 1988, Carberry moved into St. Agnes Home in Kirkwood, Missouri, where he died at age 93. He died soon after his only living relative, sister, Loretto Carberry. He is buried in the crypt of the Cathedral of St. Louis.

Catholic Church titles
Preceded by Joseph Ritter	Archbishop of St. Louis; 1968–1979	Succeeded by John L. May
Preceded by Clarence George Issenmann	Bishop of Columbus; 1965–1968	Succeeded by Clarence Edward Elwell
Preceded by John George Bennett	Bishop of Lafayette in Indiana; 1957–1965	Succeeded by Raymond Joseph Gallagher
