= Barbara Doherty =

American educator and theologian (1931–2020)

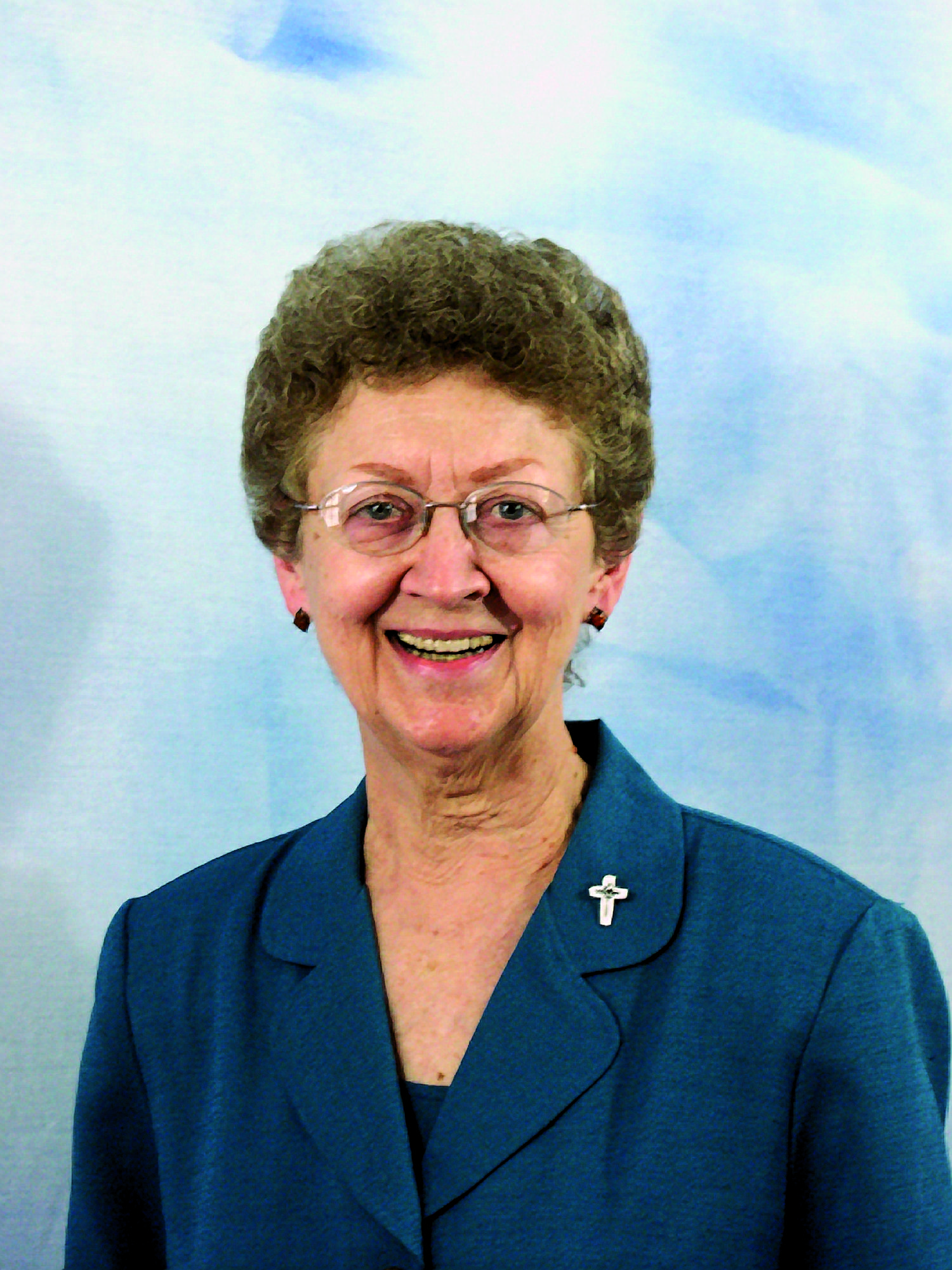
- Born: December 2, 1931
- Died: August 17, 2020 (aged 88); Saint Mary-of-the-Woods, Indiana, U.S.
- Other names: Vincent Ferrer
- Education: Saint Mary-of-the-Woods College; Saint Mary's College (Indiana); Fordham University
- Title: President of Saint Mary-of-the-Woods College
- Term: 1984–1998

Barbara Doherty (December 2, 1931 – August 17, 2020) was an educator and theologian. A Roman Catholic religious sister, she was a member of the Sisters of Providence of Saint Mary-of-the-Woods. She was president of Saint Mary-of-the-Woods College in Indiana from 1984 to 1998. Other posts have been as director of the Institute of Religious Formation at Catholic Theological Union in Chicago, president of the Indiana Conference of Higher Education, and on national boards of the Leadership Conference of Women Religious and the Women's College Coalition.

== Biography ==
Doherty was born on December 2, 1931. She attended Providence High School in Chicago, where she met the Sisters of Providence. After graduation, she entered the Sisters of Providence novitiate in 1951. In 1953 she professed final vows and took the religious name of Sister Vincent Ferrer. (Doherty later returned to using her birth name.)

Doherty held bachelor's degrees in Latin, English, and history from Saint Mary-of-the-Woods College; a Master's degree in Sacred Doctrine from Saint Mary's College (Indiana); and a doctorate in Theology from Fordham University. She also received honorary doctor of letters degrees from Indiana State University and Dominican University.

During the 1940s and 1950s, Doherty worked with the Friendship House and on Chicago's Skid Row. In 1963 she began work with the formation of new sisters in her congregation, and in 1964 she was named Mistress of Postulants. In this role she helped guide the congregation through the transitions required for women religious by the Second Vatican Council.

In 1982 Doherty was on the steering committee to found the Women of Providence in Collaboration, an association of religious congregations related to Providence. Doherty has studied and lectured in Europe, Asia, Central America, South America and Polynesia and has lectured on various non-Christian religions including Hinduism and Buddhism.

Doherty served as coordinator of the Office of the Shrine of Saint Mother Theodore Guerin for the Sisters of Providence of Saint Mary-of-the-Woods from August 2007 until January 2011. She died on August 17, 2020. A virtual funeral has been planned for August 26, 2020. An in-person funeral was held on November 2, 2021.

== Works ==
- I Am What I Do: Contemplation and Human Experience (1981)
- Make Yourself an Ark (1984)

Educational offices
Preceded by Jeanne Knoerle, SP	President of Saint Mary-of-the-Woods College; 1984–1998	Succeeded by Joan Lescinski, CSJ
