= George Avis Fulcher =

Catholic bishop

His Excellency, The Most Reverend George Avis Fulcher
- Bishop of Lafayette in Indiana; Titular Bishop of Morosbisdus
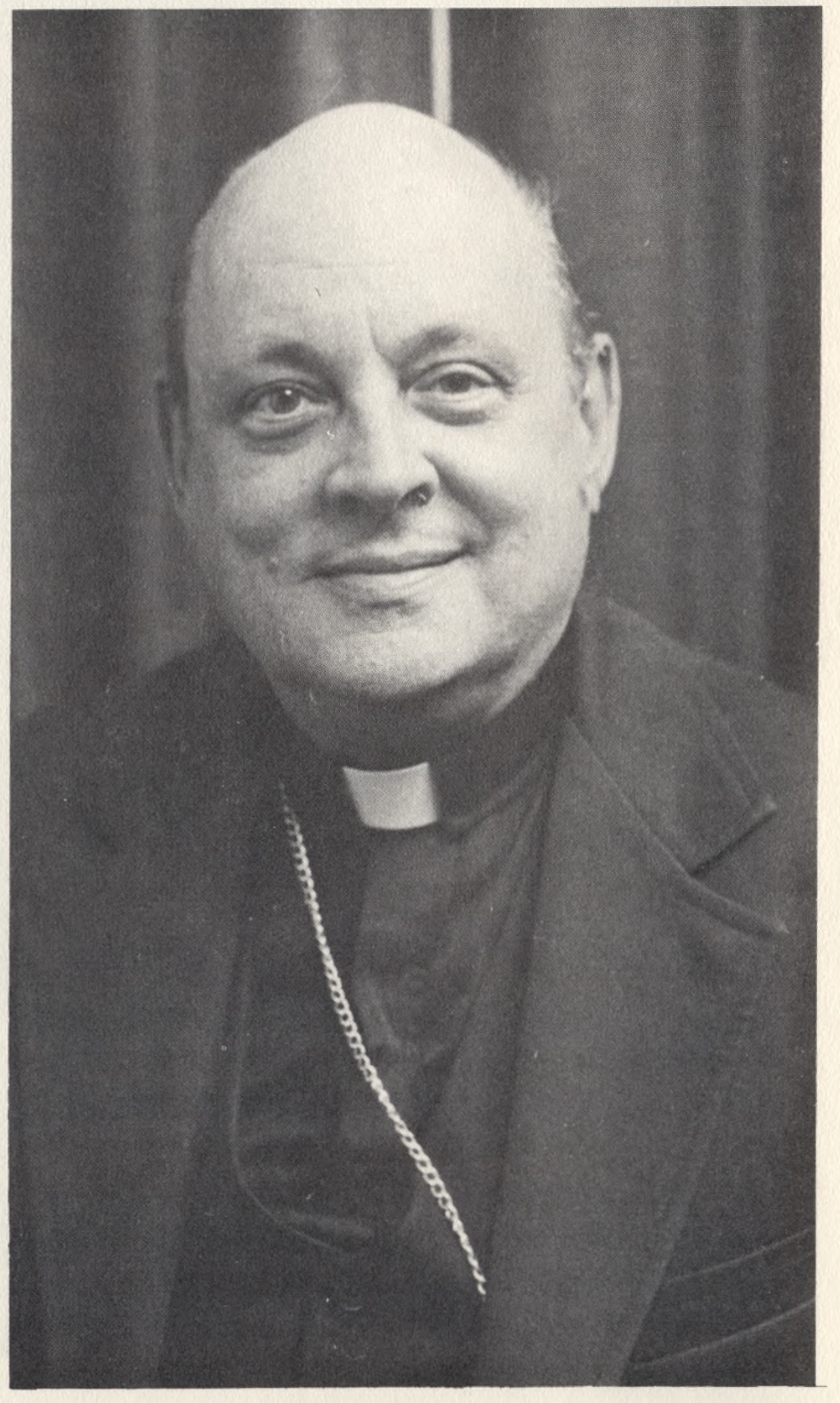
- Church: Roman Catholic Church
- See: Diocese of Lafayette in Indiana
- Predecessor: Raymond Joseph Gallagher
- Successor: William Leo Higi
- Other posts: Auxiliary Bishop of Columbus; 1976 to 1983; Titular Bishop of Morosbisdus

Orders
- Ordination: February 28, 1948 by Michael Joseph Ready
- Consecration: July 18, 1976 by Edward John Herrmann

Personal details
- Born: January 30, 1922 Columbus, Ohio, US
- Died: January 25, 1984 (aged 61) Rockville, Indiana, US
- Motto: God is light

Styles of George Avis Fulcher
- Reference style: Reverend
- Spoken style: Your Excellency
- Religious style: Bishop
- Posthumous style: none

George Avis Fulcher (January 30, 1922 – January 25, 1984) was an American Catholic prelate who served as bishop of Lafayette in Indiana from 1983 until his death in 1984. He previously served as an auxiliary bishop in the Diocese of Columbus in Ohio from 1976 to 1983.

== Biography ==
=== Early life ===
George Fulcher was born in Columbus, Ohio, on January 30, 1922, to George and Mary (Lennon) Fulcher. He was baptized at Saint Patrick Church and briefly attended primary school there, before his family moved to the Hilltop and began attending St. Aloysius. He graduated from Saint Charles Preparatory School in Columbus 1940 and entered seminary studies at the Athenaeum of Ohio in Cincinnati, Ohio, in 1944.

=== Priesthood ===
Fulcher was ordained a priest for the Diocese of Columbus by Bishop Michael Ready on February 28, 1948, in Columbus. In addition to parish pastoral work, he served as the editor-in-chief of the diocesan newspaper, the Catholic Times, from 1958 to 1963.

=== Auxiliary Bishop of Columbus ===
Fulcher was appointed as an auxiliary bishop of Columbus and titular bishop of Morosbisdus by Pope Paul VI on May 24, 1976. Fulcher was consecrated at Saint Joseph Cathedral in Columbus by Bishop Edward John Herrmann on July 18, 1976. He served as the rector of St. Joseph Cathedral from 1975 to 1983, and also served on the NCCB committee that drafted the Pastoral Letter on Peace.

=== Bishop of Lafayette in Indiana ===
On February 8, 1983, Fulcher was appointed by Pope John Paul II as bishop of Lafayette in Indiana. He was later appointed to the US Conference of Catholic Bishops committee for the implementation of the Pastoral Letter on Peace.

While returning from a conference with religious superiors in Terre Haute, Indiana, on January 25, 1984, George Fulcher died in a car crash on US-41 near Rockville, Indiana. He was 61 years old.

== Episcopal succession ==
Catholic Church titles
Preceded by Raymond Joseph Gallagher	Bishop of Lafayette in Indiana; 1983—1984	Succeeded by William Leo Higi
