= Joan Lescinski =

American journalist

Sr. Joan Lescinski CSJ
- Born: 1947 (age 77–78); Albany, New York, US
- Known for: President of St. Mary-of-the-Woods College, Saint Mary-of-the-Woods, Indiana; President of St. Ambrose University, Davenport, Iowa

Joan Lescinski CSJ was the 13th president of St. Ambrose University in Davenport, Iowa. She is the first woman to lead the university in its history. Lescinski took office in the summer of 2007, succeeding Edward Rogalski, who retired after 20 years as the university's president. She retired after 14 years as the university's president on August 6, 2021.

== Biography ==
A native of Albany, New York, Lescinski is the daughter of Joseph and Lucy Lescinski. Sr. Joan professed religious vows as a member of the Sisters of St. Joseph of Carondelet, St. Louis, Missouri in 1965. In 1970 she received a bachelor's degree and in 1974 a master's degree in English literature from the College of St. Rose in Albany. She earned a doctorate in 1981 from Brown University in Providence, Rhode Island.

Lescinski started her teaching career at an inner-city Catholic high school in Utica, New York. She has taught at the college level since 1972. From 1979 to 1991, she worked as a professor of English at the College of St. Rose; from 1991 to 1993 she served as associate dean, academic affairs and professor of English at Avila University in Kansas City, Missouri; and from 1993 to 1998 she served as vice president of academic affairs, dean and professor of English at Fontbonne University in St. Louis, Missouri. She became president and professor of English at St. Mary-of-the-Woods College, serving from 1998 to 2007.

St. Mary-of-the-Woods College, "The Woods," is the oldest Catholic liberal arts women's college in the United States. Lescinski led SMWC to record gains in enrollment, facilitated the development of institutional strategic and master plans, and introduced several undergraduate and two new graduate academic programs. SMWC invested $10 million in campus facilities and had a significant increase in its number of donors. Lescinski led the most ambitious capital campaign in SMWC's history, with $25 million raised, exceeding their campaign goal by 20 percent.

In 2007, Lescinski became the first nun and first female president of St. Ambrose University (SAU) in Davenport, Iowa. Under her leadership, the university has expanded on and beyond the main campus. In 2009, ground was broken for the Center for Health Sciences Education building on the Genesis Medical Center West Central Park campus, with an addition built in 2014.

Also in 2009, SAU established its presence in downtown Davenport at the DavenportOne New Ventures Center, where students take graduate and professional development courses. The following year in 2010, the university purchased the residence building and property of the Diocese of Davenport, while the Diocese was in bankruptcy. The land is being developed in partnership with the adjacent Assumption High School for an athletic complex.

Anticipated for completion in Fall 2017 is a new Wellness and Recreation Center on the main campus in the location of the former Timmerman Field. This will mark the conclusion of the largest single capital project in the university's history.

During Lescinski's tenure, several degree programs have been added or expanded at the undergraduate and graduate levels: Mechanical Engineering (2011); Master of Physician Assistant Studies (2014); Master of Early Childhood Education (2015); Healthcare and Business Sales (2016); and Doctor of Occupational Therapy (2016).

Academic offices
Preceded by Barbara Doherty	President of St. Mary-of-the-Woods College; 1998–2007	Succeeded by David Behrs
Preceded by Edward Rogalski	President of St. Ambrose University; 2007–2021	Succeeded by Amy C. Novak
