= Jeanne Knoerle =

Sister Jeanne Knoerle, S.P.
- Sister Jeanne Knoerle in May 1979
- Born: Mary Jeanne Knoerle; February 24, 1928; Lakewood, Ohio
- Died: June 10, 2013 (aged 85); Saint Mary-of-the-Woods, Indiana
- Other names: Sister Mary Gregory
- Education: Saint Mary-of-the-Woods College, Indiana University
- Known for: President of Saint Mary-of-the-Woods College, 1968–1983

Sister Jeanne Knoerle, S.P., (February 24, 1928 – June 10, 2013) was an author, educator and theologian. A Roman Catholic religious sister, she was a member of the Sisters of Providence of Saint Mary-of-the-Woods. She was president of Saint Mary-of-the-Woods College in Indiana from 1968 to 1983. Other posts were with the Association of Catholic Colleges and Universities (board chair, 1979–80) and with the Lilly Endowment.

== Early life ==
Knoerle was born in Lakewood, Ohio to parents Harold M. Knoerle and Bernadine Seufert. On July 22, 1949, she joined the Sisters of Providence and took the religious name Sister Mary Gregory. She became a fully professed member of the Congregation on January 23, 1957.

Knoerle earned her bachelor's degree in drama from Saint Mary-of-the-Woods College and later went on to study at Indiana University, where she earned two master's degrees (in journalism and business) and a Ph.D. in comparative literature. She emphasized in Chinese literature, particularly the poet Lu Ji and the classical Chinese Novel Dream of the Red Chamber.

== Career ==
After teaching at the high school level for four years, Knoerle began teaching at her alma mater, Saint Mary-of-the-Woods College. Upon completion of her Ph.D. she served one year as visiting professor at Providence College in Taiwan.

=== Saint Mary-of-the-Woods College ===
Knoerle then served as assistant president of Saint Mary-of-the-Woods College until she was named the twelfth president of the school in 1968, a position she held until 1983. As president of the College, Knoerle started the Women's External Degree program (now called Woods OnLine) in 1973 as a distance learning option for women with families. It is now one of the largest online degree programs in Indiana.

In her role as president, she participated in a number of symposiums and conferences, including the 1976 Congress of Presidents in New York City and as keynote speaker at the 1977 Indiana state deans' convention.

=== Later work ===
Knoerle participated in projects with Monastic Interreligious Dialogue and initiated the Brookland Commission, an inquiry beginning in 1988 into the place of intellectual life among communities of women religious.

In 1988 Knoerle began as a program director of the Lilly Endowment, overseeing the Religion Division. In this role, she particularly championed telling the story of colleges founded by women's religious congregations.

Throughout her lifetime, Knoerle was very active in the Terre Haute, Indiana community. She served on the board of numerous organizations, including the Terre Haute Chamber of Commerce, Union Hospital (Indiana), Hospice of the Wabash Valley, Mental Health Association of the Wabash Valley, and Wabash Valley United Way. She also helped found the Alliance for Growth and Progress in Terre Haute as well as the Our Green Valley Alliance.

After her work with Lilly, Knoerle took on work within her Congregation, serving as Director of Residential Life and Services for the Sisters of Providence. She also volunteered in the fiber program at White Violet Center for Eco-Justice as a spinner and weaver.

=== Recognition ===
Knoerle received honorary doctorate degrees from six different universities, including Indiana University, Indiana State University and Rose-Hulman Institute of Technology. She received the John K. Lamb Award for her service to Terre Haute and a Ford Foundation Fellowship. She also was a Fulbright Scholar.

In April 2012, she was named a Wabash Valley Woman of Influence by the United Way.

After her death, Saint Mary-of-the-Woods College named their new athletic facility the Jeanne Knoerle Sports and Recreation Center in her honor. The Our Green Valley Alliance for Sustainability in Terre Haute, Indiana, also gave her name to an award, the Sister Jeanne Knoerle Sustainability Award.

== Works ==
- The Dream of the Red Chamber: A Critical Study (1972)

=== As contributor ===
- National Congress on Church-Related Colleges and Universities, Church and College: A Vital Partnership: Volume 4: Exchange (1980)
- Deedy, John, ed. The Catholic Church in the Twentieth Century: Renewing and Reimaging the City of God (2001)
- Schier, Tracy, ed. and Cynthia Russett, ed. Catholic Women's Colleges in America (2002)
- Sisters of Providence, Love, Mercy, and Justice: A Book of Practices of the Sisters of Providence of Saint Mary-of-the-Woods, Indiana (2006)

Educational offices
Preceded by Marie Perpetua Hayes, S.P.	President of Saint Mary-of-the-Woods College; 1968–1983	Succeeded by Barbara Doherty, S.P.
Preceded by Norbert Hruby	Board Chair of Association of Catholic Colleges and Universities; 1979–1980	Succeeded by Rev. Frederick McManus
