= John George Bennett =

His Excellency, The Most Reverend John George Bennett
- Bishop of Lafayette in Indiana
- Church: Roman Catholic Church
- See: Diocese of Lafayette in Indiana
- Successor: John Carberry

Orders
- Ordination: June 27, 1914 by Herman Joseph Alerding
- Consecration: January 10, 1945 by John F. Noll

Personal details
- Born: January 20, 1891 Dunnington, Indiana, US
- Died: November 20, 1957 (aged 66)
- Education: St. Joseph's College; St. Meinrad Seminary
- Motto: Imple superna gratia (Fill with eternal grace)

Styles of John George Bennett
- Reference style: His Excellency; The Most Reverend
- Spoken style: Your Excellency
- Religious style: Bishop

John George Bennett (January 20, 1891—November 20, 1957) was an American prelate of the Roman Catholic Church. He served as bishop of the Diocese of Lafayette in Indiana from 1945 until his death in 1957.

== Biography ==
=== Early life ===
John Bennett was born on January 20, 1891, in Dunnington, Indiana. Deciding to become a priest, he studied at St. Joseph's College in Rensselaer, Indiana, and St. Meinrad Seminary in St. Meinrad, Indiana.

Bennett was ordained to the priesthood by Bishop Herman Joseph Alerding for the Diocese of Fort Wayne on June 27, 1914. After his ordination, Bennett served as a curate at St. Peter Parish in Fort Wayne, Indiana (1914–1927), as pastor of St. Joseph Parish in Garrett, Indiana (1927–1944), and defensor vinculi of the diocese (1929–1944).

==== Bishop of Lafayette in Indiana ====
On November 11, 1944, Bennett was appointed as the first bishop of the newly erected Diocese of Lafayette in Indiana by Pope Pius XII. He received his episcopal consecration on January 10, 1945, from Bishop John F. Noll, with Bishops Francis Cotton and John O'Hara, serving as co-consecrators.

John Bennett died on November 20, 1957, at age 66.

== Episcopal succession ==
Catholic Church titles
| Preceded by – | Bishop of Lafayette in Indiana; 1945—1957 | Succeeded by John Carberry |
