= Mike Prior =

American football player (born 1963)

No. 24, 39, 45
- Position: Safety

Personal information
- Born: November 14, 1963 (age 62); Chicago Heights, Illinois, U.S.
- Listed height: 6 ft 0 in (1.83 m)
- Listed weight: 208 lb (94 kg)

Career information
- High school: Marian Catholic (Chicago Heights)
- College: Illinois State
- NFL draft: 1985: 7th round, 176th overall pick

Career history
- Tampa Bay Buccaneers (1985–1986); Indianapolis Colts (1987–1992); Green Bay Packers (1993–1998)

Awards and highlights
- Super Bowl champion (XXXI); NCAA Division I-AA first-team All-American (1983); Illinois State Hall of Fame (1991); Chicagoland Hall of Fame (2008); Missouri Valley Conference Hall of Fame (2020)

Career NFL statistics
- Tackles: 691
- Interceptions: 35
- Forced fumbles: 7
- Fumble recoveries: 17
- Stats at Pro Football Reference

Michael Robert Prior (born November 14, 1963) is an American former professional football player who was a safety for 13 seasons in the National Football League (NFL) with the Tampa Bay Buccaneers, Indianapolis Colts and Green Bay Packers. He played college football for the Illinois State Redbirds. Prior currently serves as the Football Development Commissioner for the Indianapolis Colts.

== Early life ==
Mike Prior was born on November 14, 1963, in Chicago Heights, Illinois. Prior attended Marian Catholic High School where he played football, baseball, and wrestling. In football, Prior starred at running back and defensive back. In his senior season, he was selected to the Chicago All-Area Football Team on both offense and defense.

== College career ==
Prior played both football and baseball at Illinois State, setting the school record for batting average at .388. In football, he set the school record in punt return yardage and had his No. 15 jersey retired. Immediately following his college career, Prior was selected by the Los Angeles Dodgers in the fourth round of the 1985 Major League Baseball draft and the Tampa Bay Buccaneers in the seventh round of the 1985 NFL draft. He was also drafted by the Baltimore Orioles in the 18th round of the 1984 draft and by the Houston Astros in the fourth round of the 1986 secondary draft. Prior chose football because it would be easier to raise a family and involve less traveling than working through baseball's minor leagues. He graduated from Illinois State with a degree in business administration.

== Professional career ==
=== Tampa Bay Buccaneers (1985–1986) ===
Prior played his rookie season with the Tampa Bay Buccaneers in 1985. He almost made the starting lineup at safety, but the late add of David Greenwood relegated Prior to mainly special teams action as a member of the Bucs. A fractured wrist sustained in a preseason game against the Washington Redskins landed him on injured reserve; he was waived from that list in October.

=== Indianapolis Colts (1987–1992) ===
Prior joined the Indianapolis Colts in February 1987. He was cut by the team on September 1, but later returned as a replacement player in the 1987 NFL Strike, starting three games. After the strike ended, the team retained him, initially utilizing Prior on special teams but later moving him up to a defensive starter. In 1989, Prior intercepted a Bernie Kosar pass and returned it for a touchdown in overtime to help the Colts defeat the Cleveland Browns. He was named AFC Defensive Player of the Week for his exploits. In 1990, Prior caught his first NFL pass on a successful fake punt attempt. Prior was injured early in the 1991 season, and was placed on the injured reserve list in October. He stayed with team through the 1992 season and then became a free agent.

=== Green Bay Packers (1993–1998) ===
Prior signed with the Green Bay Packers in April 1993. The team brought him on as a replacement for the recently departed Chuck Cecil. In his debut season, Prior moved into the punt returner role late in the year when Robert Brooks was injured. Injuries in the defensive backfield led to an increased late-season role in 1994. Prior nabbed an interception in Super Bowl XXXI. He was released by the team before the 1998 season but was quickly re-signed. The Packers did not re-sign Prior after the season.

== Personal life ==
Prior returned to Indianapolis after retiring from the NFL. He served as the athletic director for St. Luke School Catholic School before returning to the Colts in 2005 as the Youth Football Commissioner (now Football Development Commissioner). Prior also serves as an assistant football coach at Cathedral High School in Indianapolis. Prior has three daughters.
