= Timothy Doherty =

American Roman Catholic bishop

His Excellency, The Most Reverend Timothy Lawrence Doherty
- Bishop of Lafayette in Indiana
- Diocese: Lafayette in Indiana
- Appointed: May 12, 2010
- Installed: July 15, 2010
- Predecessor: William Leo Higi

Orders
- Ordination: June 26, 1976 by Arthur J. O'Neill
- Consecration: July 15, 2010 by Daniel M. Buechlein, William Leo Higi, and Thomas G. Doran

Personal details
- Born: September 29, 1950 (age 76) Rockford, Illinois, US
- Denomination: Roman Catholic
- Education: St. Ambrose University; Pontifical Gregorian University; Pontifical Lateran University; Loyola University Chicago
- Motto: The word of God is not chained

Styles of Timothy Lawrence Doherty
- Reference style: His Excellency; The Most Reverend
- Spoken style: Your Excellency
- Religious style: Bishop

Timothy Lawrence Doherty (born September 29, 1950) is an American prelate of the Roman Catholic Church. He was a priest of the Diocese of Rockford in Illinois until he was appointed bishop of the Diocese of Lafayette in Indiana by Pope Benedict XVI on May 12, 2010. On July 15, 2010, Doherty was consecrated, becoming the sixth bishop of the diocese.

== Biography ==
=== Early life and education ===
Timothy Doherty was born on September 29, 1950, in Rockford, Illinois, the eldest of seven children of Lawrence and June Doherty. In 1964, at age 14, he decided to become a priest. He then entered St. Mary Minor Seminary in Crystal Lake, Illinois. After graduating from St. Mary in 1968, Doherty enrolled at St. Ambrose University in Davenport, Iowa. He received a Bachelor of Arts degree from St. Ambrose in 1972.

Doherty in 1972 traveled to Rome to enter the seminary at the Pontifical North American College. He was awarded a Bachelor of Sacred Theology degree in 1975 from the Pontifical Gregorian University in Rome.

=== Ordination and ministry ===
On June 26, 1976, Doherty was ordained a priest of the Diocese of Rockford at Saint Thomas the Apostle Church in Crystal Lake by Bishop Arthur J. O'Neill.

After his 1976 ordination, the diocese assigned Doherty as an associate pastor at the Cathedral of St. Peter Parish in Rockford, where he remained for five years. He was sent back to Rome in 1981 to study at the Pontifical Lateran University. He earned a Licentiate of Sacred Theology in moral theology from the Alfonsian Academy at the university in 1982.

After Doherty's return to Illinois in 1982, the diocese assigned him as a teacher of religious studies at Boylan Catholic High School in Rockford. He left Boylan in 1986 to become assistant principal and head of the religion department at Marian Central Catholic High School in Woodstock, Illinois.

Doherty in 1991 began his doctoral studies at Loyola University Chicago; he received a Doctor of Philosophy degree in Christian Ethics from Loyola in 1995. That same year, Bishop Thomas Doran appointed Doherty as diocesan ethicist for health care issues. From 1996 to 1999, he also served as an associate pastor at Saint Anthony College of Nursing in Rockford, teaching courses in theology and health care ethics.

In 1999, Doherty left Saint Anthony to become parochial administrator for a short period St. James Parish in Lee, Illinois. Later in 1999, he was appointed pastor of St. Mary Parish in Byron, Illinois. Doherty would stay at St. Mary for the next six years. After 2007, the diocese transferred him to serve as pastor at both St. Catherine of Siena Parish in Dundee, Illinois, and St. Mary Mission Parish in Gilberts, Illinois.

=== Bishop of Lafayette in Indiana ===
On May 12, 2010, Doherty was appointed the sixth bishop of Lafayette in Indiana by Benedict XVI. He succeeded Bishop William Higi, who reached the mandatory retirement age of 75 in August 2008. Doherty received his episcopal consecration at the Cathedral of Saint Mary of the Immaculate Conception from Archbishop Daniel M. Buechlein on July 15, 2010, with Higi and Bishop Thomas G. Doran serving as co-consecrators. As bishop, Doherty has served as chair of the U.S. Conference of Catholic Bishops (USCCB) Committee for the Protection of Children and Young People.

Doherty in August 2018 said that he was disgusted and angry about the findings of massive clerical sexual abuse and cover-ups of that abuse in Pennsylvania in a special grand jury report released by Pennsylvania Attorney General Josh Shapiro. On July 1, 2020, Doherty suspended Reverend Theodore Rothrock, a priest at St. Elizabeth Seton Parish in Carmel, Indiana, from public ministry. In a Sunday bulletin, Rothrock had described Black Lives Matter (BLM) organizers as like parasites and maggots. Rothrock later apologized for his statement. A week later, Doherty stated that he does not support the BLM organization and condemned violence at peaceful demonstrations.

== See also ==
- Catholic Church hierarchy
- Catholic Church in the United States
- Historical list of the Catholic bishops of the United States
- List of Catholic bishops of the United States
- Lists of patriarchs, archbishops, and bishops

== Episcopal succession ==
Catholic Church titles
Preceded by William Leo Higi	Bishop of Lafayette in Indiana; 2010—present	Succeeded by Incumbent
