= James Conroyd Martin =

American novelist

- Occupations: Writer, English teacher
- Writing career
- Period: 2000s–present
- Genre: Historical fiction
- Website: jamescmartin.com/index.htm

James Conroyd Martin is an American historical fiction author and teacher.

== Personal ==
Martin received his bachelor's degree from Saint Ambrose University and received a Master of Arts in English literature from DePaul University. A native of Chicago, Martin chaired the English Department at Marian Catholic High School in Chicago Heights, Illinois. He has since retired and moved to Portland, OR, where he continues writing.

Although not of Polish descent, Martin has been praised by the Polish-American community for his Polish Trilogy and was honored in 2007 by the American Institute of Polish Culture and in 2008 by the Wisconsin Division of the Polish American Congress.

== Bibliography ==
- The Boy Who Wanted Wings (2016)
- Hologram: A Haunting (2014)

=== Polish trilogy ===
- Push not the River (2001)
- Against a Crimson Sky (2006)
- The Warsaw Conspiracy (2012)
