= Edward Rogalski =

American academic administrator (1942–2026)

- Born: February 16, 1942; Manville, New Jersey, U.S.
- Died: September 23, 2026 (aged 84); Bettendorf, Iowa, U.S.
- Known for: President of St. Ambrose University, Davenport, Iowa

Edward J. Rogalski (February 16, 1942 – September 23, 2026) was an American religious leader and academic administrator who was the 12th president of St. Ambrose University in Davenport, Iowa, from 1987 to 2007. In 1968, Rogalski became president of St. Ambrose University in 1987. From 1974 to 1980, Rogalski was St. Ambrose’s vice president for administration, and from 1981 to 1986, the institution’s senior vice president. He served as executive vice president at the time of his appointment to the presidency. Throughout his career at the university, Rogalski has also been a member of the faculty in the Department of Education. He held the rank of professor.

== Life and career ==
Edward J. Rogalski was born in Manville, New Jersey, on February 16, 1942. A native of Manville, New Jersey, Rogalski received his Bachelor of Arts degree from Rutgers University, with majors in social sciences and education. He earned his master's degree in student personnel administration and the doctor of philosophy degree in higher education from the University of Iowa.

Rogalski was on the board of directors of US Bank, Genesis Health System, the Handicapped Development Center, and the Scott County Family Y. He was the chairman of the board of directors of the Genesis Health System, president of the Davenport Rotary Club, chairman of DavenportOne, vice chair of the Davenport Civil Rights Commission, on the board of directors for Big Brothers/Big Sisters and on the board of directors for Junior Achievement.

He was also chair and member of the executive committee of the Iowa Association of Independent Colleges and Universities (IAICU) and chair and member of the executive committee of the Iowa College Foundation. He was a board member and commissioner on State Policy for the National Association of Independent Colleges and Universities, a member of the Phi Delta Kappa Education Society, and consultant to the Marriott Corporation Educational Division.

Rogalski was named a Knight of St. Gregory and named an Outstanding Business Leader by Seabury and Smith. He was also a member of the Holy Family Church, an extraordinary minister of Holy Communion, and a president of the parish council. He was awarded an honorary doctorate from Loras College in 1990.

He and his wife, Bobbi, had five sons. He died at a retirement community in Bettendorf, Iowa, on September 23, 2026, at the age of 84.

Academic offices
| Preceded by William J. Bakrow | President of St. Ambrose University; 1987–2007 | Succeeded by Joan Lescinski |
