= Diocese of Lafayette in Indiana =

Latin Catholic jurisdiction in the US

Coordinates: 40°25′02″N 86°52′43″W

Diocese of Lafayette in Indiana Dioecesis Lafayettensis in Indiana
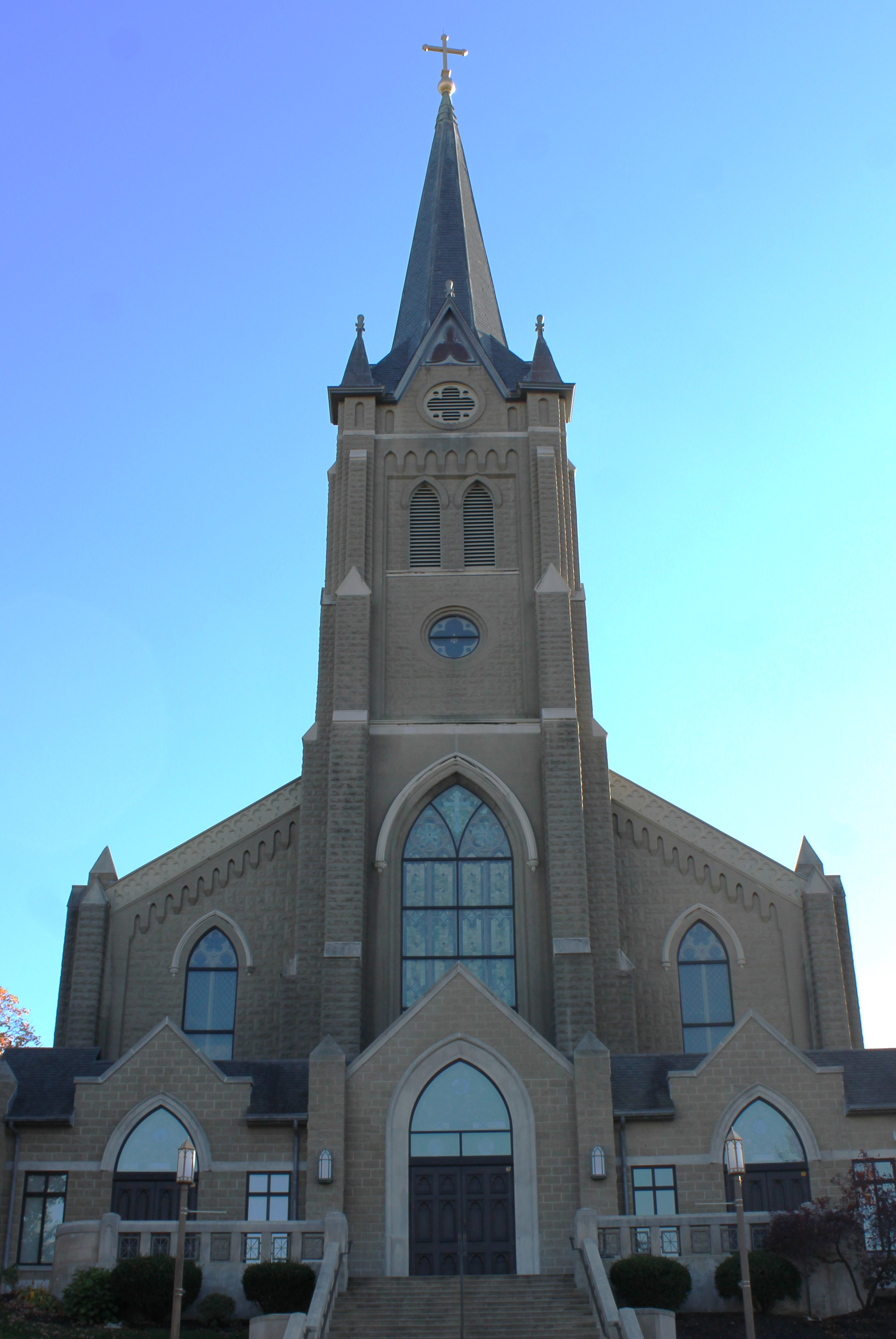
- St. Mary's Cathedral of the Immaculate Conception

- Coat of arms

Location
- Country: United States
- Territory: Central Indiana
- Ecclesiastical province: Indianapolis

Statistics
- Area: 9,832 sq mi (25,460 km^{2})
- Population: Total; Catholics: (as of 2023); 1,292,100; 111,200 (8.6%)
- Parishes: 61

Information
- Denomination: Catholic
- Sui iuris church: Latin Church
- Rite: Roman Rite
- Established: October 21, 1944 (81 years ago)
- Cathedral: The Cathedral of Saint Mary of the Immaculate Conception
- Patron saint: Immaculate Conception; Théodore Guérin

Current leadership
- Pope: Leo XIV
- Bishop: Timothy L. Doherty
- Metropolitan Archbishop: Charles C. Thompson

Map
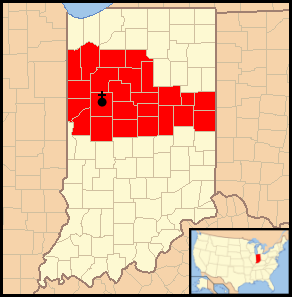

Website
- dol-in.org

The Diocese of Lafayette in Indiana (Latin: Dioecesis Lafayettensis in Indiana) is a diocese of the Catholic Church in central Indiana in the United States. The bishop is Timothy L. Doherty. The Diocese of Lafayette in Indiana is a suffragan diocese of the metropolitan Archdiocese of Indianapolis.

== History ==
=== 1700 to 1800 ===
The Indiana area was part of the French colony of New France during the 17th century and the first half of the 18th century. It was explored by French fur traders and missionaries under the Bishop of Quebec. It became British territory after the French Indian War ended in 1763; however, the British government refused to allow American colonists to enter the region.

Several years after the American Revolution in 1789, Pope Pius VI erected the Diocese of Baltimore, covering the entire United States. John Francis served as vicar-general in the west from 1798 until his death in 1804.

=== 1800 to 1850 ===
In 1808, Pope Pius VII erected the Diocese of Bardstown, with jurisdiction over the Indiana Territory and other areas in the Midwest.

The Diocese of Vincennes was created in 1834 by Pope Gregory XVI to cover the entire state of Indiana and part of Illinois. The diocese sent many French missionaries to this very anti-Catholic area. The most notable missionary was Mother Theodore Guerin, who made her way to southern Indiana with her Sisters of Providence in 1841. Guerin and the other sisters formed St. Mary of the Woods Academy at Terre Haute. Many alumni of St. Mary traveled throughout Indiana preaching.

The first Catholic parish in Lafayette was Saints Mary & Martha, founded in 1844 to serve Irish Catholic workers on the Wabash and Erie Canal. Their church was dedicated in 1846.

=== 1850 to 1900 ===
Saints Mary & Martha Parish opened the first Catholic school in Lafayette in 1850. In 1857, Pope Pius IX established the Diocese of Fort Wayne, taking its territory from the Diocese of Vincennes. The Lafayette area would be part of this diocese for the next 87 years. The first parish in Kokomo, St. Patrick's, was founded in 1859.

The Saint Joseph Orphan Asylum and Manual Training School was opened in 1868 in Rensselaer. Today it is Saint Joseph's College of Indiana.

Six members of the Sisters of St. Francis of Perpetual Adoration came to Lafayette from Germany in 1875 to tend to the sick and train members of their order as nurses. In 1876, they opened St. Elizabeth Hospital, the first Catholic hospital in Indiana; today it is Franciscan Health Lafayette East. That same year, the diocese opened the St. Joseph's Orphan Asylum for boys in Lafayette.

=== 1900 to 1960 ===
The Sisters of St. Francis founded the St. Elizabeth School of Nursing in Lafayette in 1922. The Montfort Fathers established Our Lady of Grace Parish in Noblesville in September 1944. Pope Pius XII erected the Diocese of Lafayette in Indiana on October 21, 1944, with territory of the Diocese of Fort Wayne. The new diocese had 54 parishes and an approximate population of 31,700 Catholics.

In 1945, the pope named John Bennett of Fort Wayne as the first bishop of the new diocese. John Carberry of the Diocese of Brooklyn was appointed coadjutor bishop of Lafayette to assist Bennett in 1956 by Pius XII. When Bennett died in 1957, Carberry automatically became the next bishop of Lafayette.

=== 1960 to 2000 ===
Carberry convened the first diocesan synod and established the Diocesan Council of Men and the Society for Priestly Vocations during his tenure. A 1964 census of the diocese found a population of 73,822 Catholics and noted a move from mostly rural populations to scattered suburban areas. In 1965, Pope Paul VI appointed Carberry as bishop of the Diocese of Columbus.

In August 1965, Paul VI appointed Raymond Gallagher of the Diocese of Cleveland as the next bishop of Lafayette. Within his first five years, Gallagher dedicated many churches in northern Indiana.

With Gallagher's retirement in 1982, Auxiliary Bishop George Fulcher of the Diocese of Columbus was appointed by Pope John Paul II as his replacement. In January 1984, Fulcher died in a car crash. The pope selected Monsignor William Higi in 1984 to succeed Fulcher.

==== 2000 to present ====
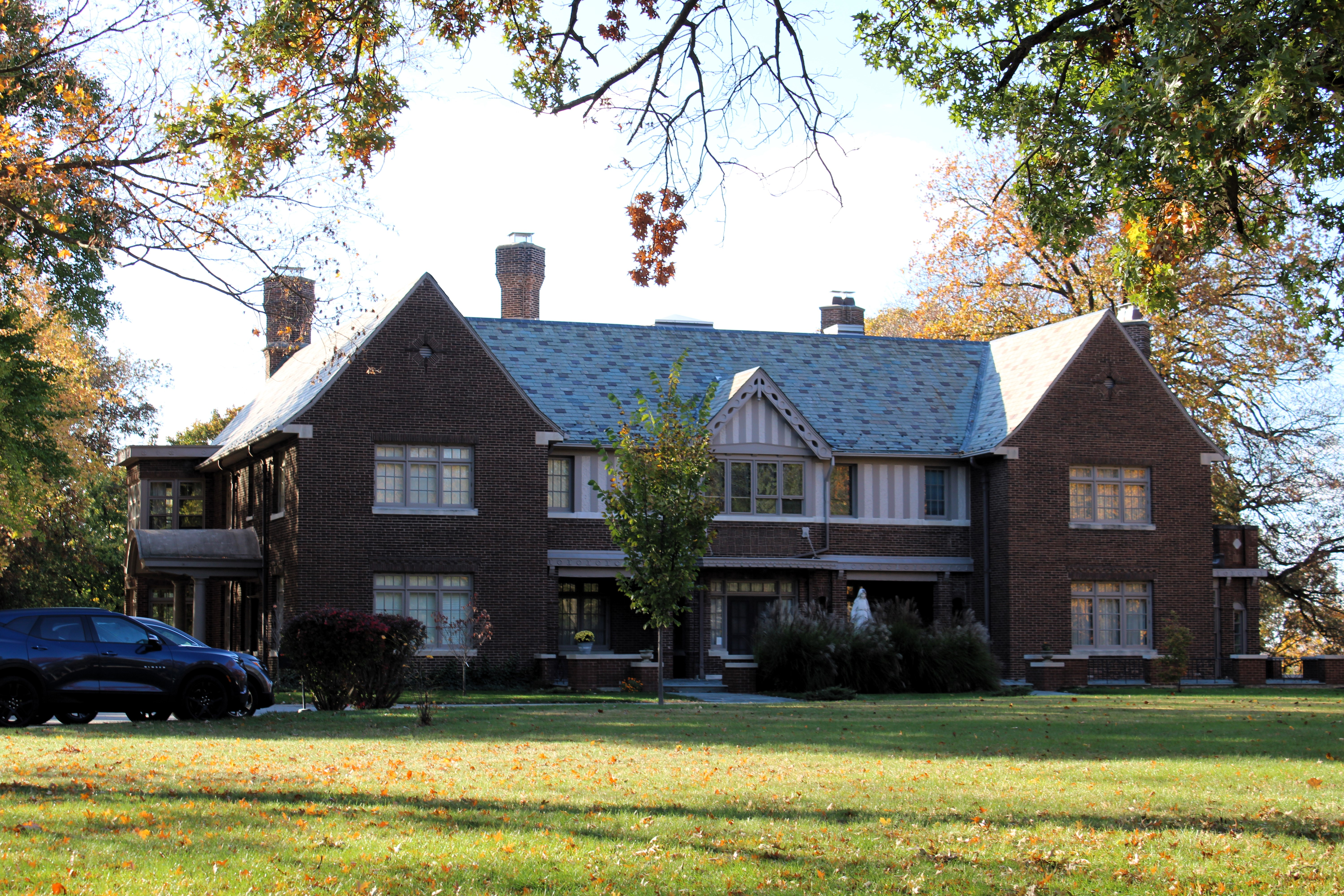
Diocesan Pastoral Center, Lafayette, Indiana (2023)

Higi opened St. Theodore Guerin High School in Noblesville in 2004. In addition to working within the diocese, he established outreach programs to Haiti. After over 26 years as bishop, Higi retired as bishop of Lafayette in 2010.

Timothy Doherty from the Diocese of Rockford was named by Pope Benedict XVI to replace Higi in 2010. Between 1990 and 2010, the number of priests in the diocese had fallen from 154 to 129. To alleviate the shortage, Doherty recruited priests from Nigeria and Mexico.

Doherty released a statement in 2015 encouraging Catholics in the diocese to avoid attending marriages of same-sex couples. He also stated that no priest or deacon could participate in such ceremonies and no Catholic facility could host them.

In July 2020, Doherty suspended Theodore Rothrock, a priest at St. Elizabeth Seton Parish in Carmel, from public ministry. In a Sunday bulletin, Rothrock had described the Black Lives Matter organizers as parasites and maggots. Rothrock later apologized for his remarks.

A family sued the diocese and Our Lady of Mount Carmel Catholic School in Carmel in June 2026, stating that their middle school son was verbally and sexually abused by some of his male classmates. The parents said that the school administrators minimized the abuse and did nothing to stop it.

=== Sex abuse ===
In 1988, the priest Ron Voss was first accused of sexually abusing a teenage boy. After undergoing therapy, Voss transferred to Haiti. The Vatican laicized him in 1993. Eight men eventually accused Voss of sexual abuse when they were teenagers.

Also in 1988, Ken Bollinger was removed from public ministry by the Diocese of Lafayette after it received complaints of him sexually abusing teenage boys. He confessed to plying his victims with alcohol and playing sexual games with them. Bollinger was laicized in 2009.

In 1997, the Indianapolis Star and News published a series of articles on sexual abuse allegations against priests in the diocese and the mishandling of these cases by diocesan officials. The paper reported that Bishop Higi established two tiers of response to sexual abuse claims: if the victim was under age 13, the diocese permanently removed the priest from ministry. In cases where the victim was over 13, but still a minor, the diocese sent the priest away for therapy and later let him return to ministry.

In 2003, Higi reported that 18 priests serving in the diocese since 1950 had been accused by 26 parishioners of sexually abusing them as minors. The diocese had removed nine priests from ministry due to credible accusations.

The diocese was sued in September 2018 by a man who said that he had been sexually abused as a minor by James Grear, pastor at Our Lady of Mount Carmel Church in Carmel in 1982. Two other men were later added to the lawsuit. Grear was permanently removed from ministry in 2001.

James DeOreo, a diocesan priest, sued the diocese for fraud and defamation in March 2024. In January 2021, a man at DeOreo's parish in Zionsville first accused DeOreo of causing him to develop an eating disorder. The diocese immediated suspended DeOreo. When the diocese found no proof of this allegation, the man then stated that DeOreo sexually abused him. DeOreo said that Theodore Dudzinski, vicar general of the diocese, gave the man the inspiration for the second set of false claims. DeOreo's lawsuit was dismissed in January 2025.

== Bishops ==
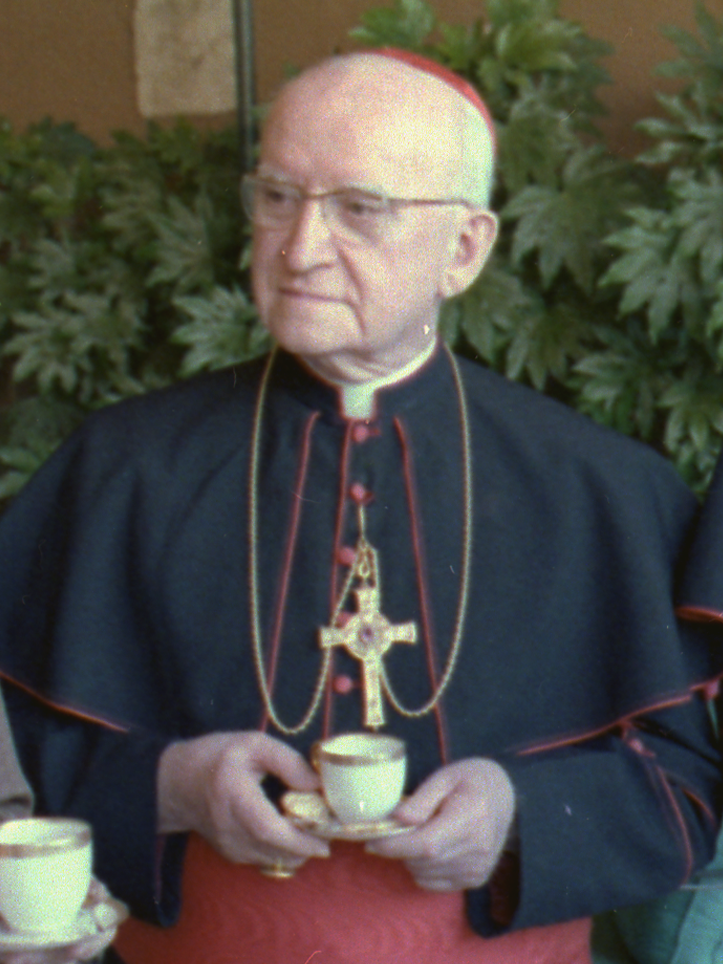
Bishop Carberry (1978)

1. John George Bennett (1944–1957)
2. John Joseph Carberry (1957–1965), appointed Bishop of Columbus and later Archbishop of Saint Louis (elevated to cardinal in 1969)
3. Raymond Joseph Gallagher (1965–1982)
4. George Avis Fulcher (1983–1984)
5. William Leo Higi (1984–2010)
6. Timothy Doherty (2010–present)

== Ecclesiastical province ==
See: List of the Catholic bishops of the United States#Province of Indianapolis

== Education ==
As of 2025, the Diocese of Lafayette in Indiana has two high schools and 16 middle/elementary schools.

=== High schools ===
- Lafayette Central Catholic Jr/Sr High School – Lafayette
- Guerin High School – Noblesville

=== College ===
Saint Joseph's College, Rensselaer, offers certificate programs in health science, veterinary science, CPR training and executive education.

== Patron saint ==
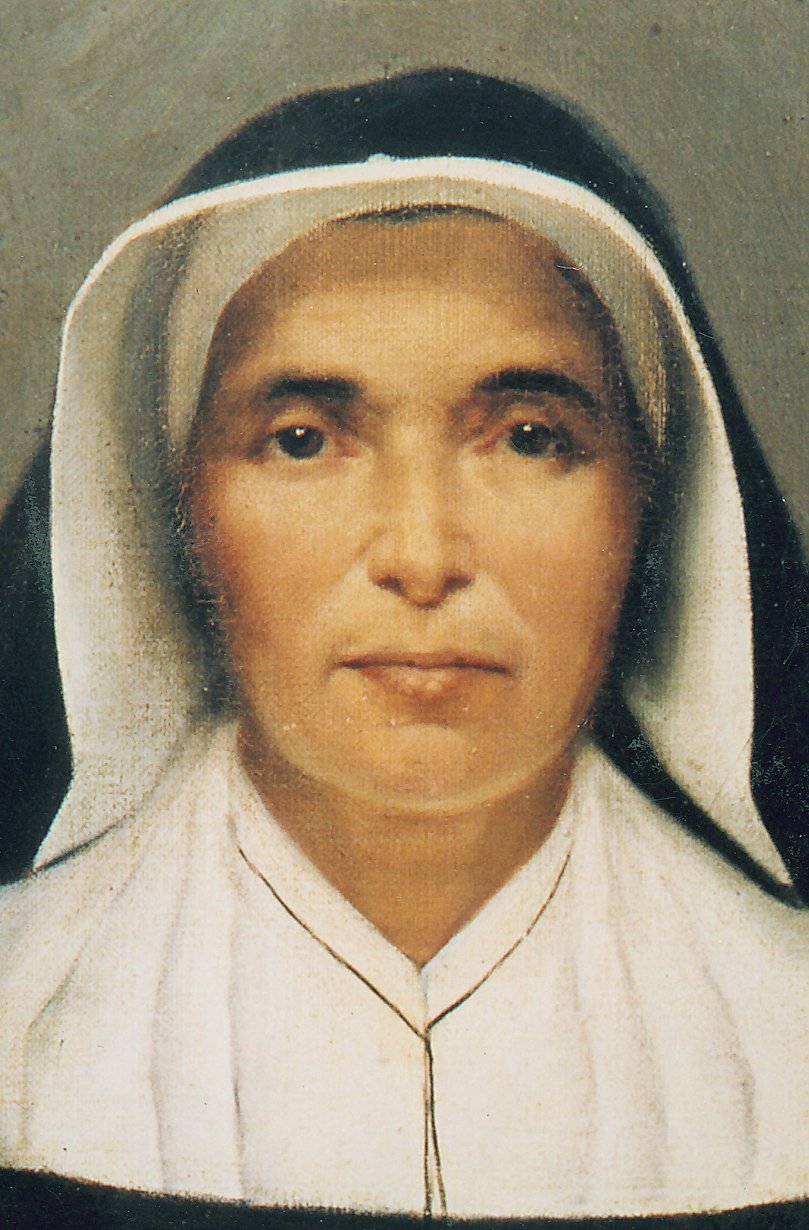
Mother Théodore Guérin (1852)

Ever since the establishment of the Diocese of Lafayette in Indiana in 1944, its patron saint has been the Immaculate Conception. The feast day for the Immaculate Conception is December 8. With the opening of St. Theodore Guerin High School in Noblesville in 2004, the diocese named Mother Théodore Guérin as a second patron saint.

== Media ==
=== Radio ===
- WRDF "Redeemer Radio" 106.3 FM licensed to Columbia City and based in Fort Wayne, plus audiostream.
- WSQM "Catholic Radio Indy" 90.9 FM in Noblesville. It is a repeater of WSPM 89.1 based in Indianapolis and licensed in Cloverdale, plus audiostream.

=== Publications ===
The Diocese of Lafayette publishes a weekly newspaper, The Catholic Moment, started in 1945. Its circulation is approximately 28,000.

== Coat of arms ==
Coat of arms of Diocese of Lafayette in Indiana
Notes Coat of arms was designed and adopted when the diocese was erected Adopted 1944 Escutcheon The arms of the diocese contain a crescent over a crenellated dividing line. It also features a field of bell-like devices in silver and blue. Superimposed over the field is a red shield with a diagonal gold bar. Symbolism The crescent is the emblem of Mary, mother of Jesus, under the title of the Immaculate Conception. She is a patroness of the diocese and its cathedral. The crenellated dividing line suggests a fort wall, likely representing homage to Fort Ouiatenon. The bell-like devices, the red shield and the diagonal gold bar represent the coat of arms of the Marquis de Lafayette, the namesake of Lafayette, Indiana.
