= Push Not the River =

2000 historical romance novel by James Conroyd Martin

- Author: James Conroyd Martin
- Genre: Historical romance
- Publisher: St. Martin's Press
- Publication date: 2000
- ISBN: 978-0-312-31150-6

Push Not the River (2000) is a historical romance novel by American author James Conroyd Martin. The novel is set in Poland in the times leading up to and during the 1792 Partition of Poland. It is based on the real diary of Countess Anna Maria Berezowska which was published in 2021 by Polyverse Publications.

== Plot summary ==
The story starts when the 17-year-old Anna is orphaned. She moves in with Aunt Stella and Uncle Leo and her cousins Walter and Zofia, a very manipulative and promiscuous girl. Anna later meets Jan Stelnicki, falls in love almost instantly and remains obsessed with him for most of her life. Zofia, jealous because she wanted Jan herself, tricks Anna into coming into the forest where she abandons her. While there, Anna is raped by a stranger. Leo goes to where Anna was raped, but he gets stuck and Zofia and Walter watch him die. Shortly after the attack, Anna is married off to Antoni and moves to Warsaw.

In Warsaw, Anna's life changes drastically. The Constitution of May 3, 1791 is signed by King Stanisław August Poniatowski, giving the peasants human rights. Many Polish nobles are enraged by the new laws and call for Catherine the Great of Russia to deliver them. Anna discovers she is pregnant from being raped and gives birth to a son. It is revealed that Walter, who supports the Russians, was the one who raped Anna. Anna becomes a supporter of Polish independence but is forced to watch as her country is overrun by hostile powers. As the victorious Russians march on Warsaw, Zofia sacrifices herself to buy time for Anna and her family to flee the war-torn city.
