= Raymond Joseph Gallagher =

American clergyman

His Excellency, The Most Reverend Raymond Joseph Gallagher
- Bishop of Lafayette in Indiana
- See: Diocese of Lafayette in Indiana
- In office: 1965—1982
- Predecessor: John Carberry
- Successor: George Avis Fulcher

Orders
- Ordination: March 25, 1939 by Joseph Schrembs
- Consecration: August 11, 1966 by Egidio Vagnozzi

Personal details
- Born: November 19, 1912 Cleveland, Ohio, US
- Died: March 7, 1991 (aged 78) Muncie, Indiana, US
- Denomination: Roman Catholic
- Parents: Hugh and Ella (née Reedy) Gallagher
- Education: St. Mary's Seminary and University; John Carroll University; Loyola University Chicago
- Motto: Caritas super omnia (Love above all)

Styles of Raymond Joseph Gallagher
- Reference style: His Excellency; The Most Reverend
- Spoken style: Your Excellency
- Religious style: Bishop

Raymond Joseph Gallagher (November 19, 1912 – March 7, 1991) was an American clergyman of the Roman Catholic Church who served as the third bishop of the Diocese of Lafayette in Indiana from 1965 to 1982.

== Biography ==
=== Early life ===
Raymond Gallagher was born on November 19, 1912, in Cleveland, Ohio, to Hugh and Ella (née Reedy) Gallagher. He was educated at St. Thomas Aquinas Parish School (1918–1926) and Cathedral Latin High School in Chardon, Ohio (1926–1930). He earned a Bachelor of Arts degree from John Carroll University in University Heights, Ohio, in 1934, and attended St. Mary's Seminary in Baltimore, Maryland, from 1934 to 1939.

=== Priesthood ===
Gallagher was ordained to the priesthood in Cleveland by Archbishop Joseph Schrembs for the Diocese of Cleveland on March 25, 1939. After his ordination, Gallagher served as a curate at St. Colman Parish in Cleveland (1939–1944). In 1944, he enlisted in the United States Navy Chaplain Corps, serving there until his discharge in 1946. In 1948, Gallagher earned a Master of Social Work degree from Loyola University Chicago and became assistant director of diocesan Catholic Charities.

Pope Pius XII named Gallagher a papal chamberlain in 1955. Between 1958 and 1959, he was a member of US President Dwight D. Eisenhower's Commission on Child Welfare, becoming chair of the White House Conference on Children and Youth in 1960. He served as general secretary of the National Conference of Catholic Charities from 1961 to 1965.

=== Bishop of Lafayette in Indiana ===
On June 21, 1965, Gallagher was appointed the third bishop of Lafayette in Indiana by Pope Paul VI. He received his episcopal consecration at the Cathedral of St. John the Evangelist in Cleveland on August 11, 1965, from Archbishop Egidio Vagnozzi, with Bishops Leo Byrne and Clarence Issenmann serving as co-consecrators.

On October 26, 1982, Pope John Paul II accepted Gallagher's resignation as bishop of Lafayette in Indiana. Raymond Gallagher died in Muncie, Indiana, on March 7, 1991, at age 78.

== See also ==
Catholic Church titles
Preceded by John Carberry	Bishop of Lafayette in Indiana; 1965—1982	Succeeded by George Avis Fulcher
