= Cathedral of Saint Mary of the Immaculate Conception (Lafayette, Indiana) =

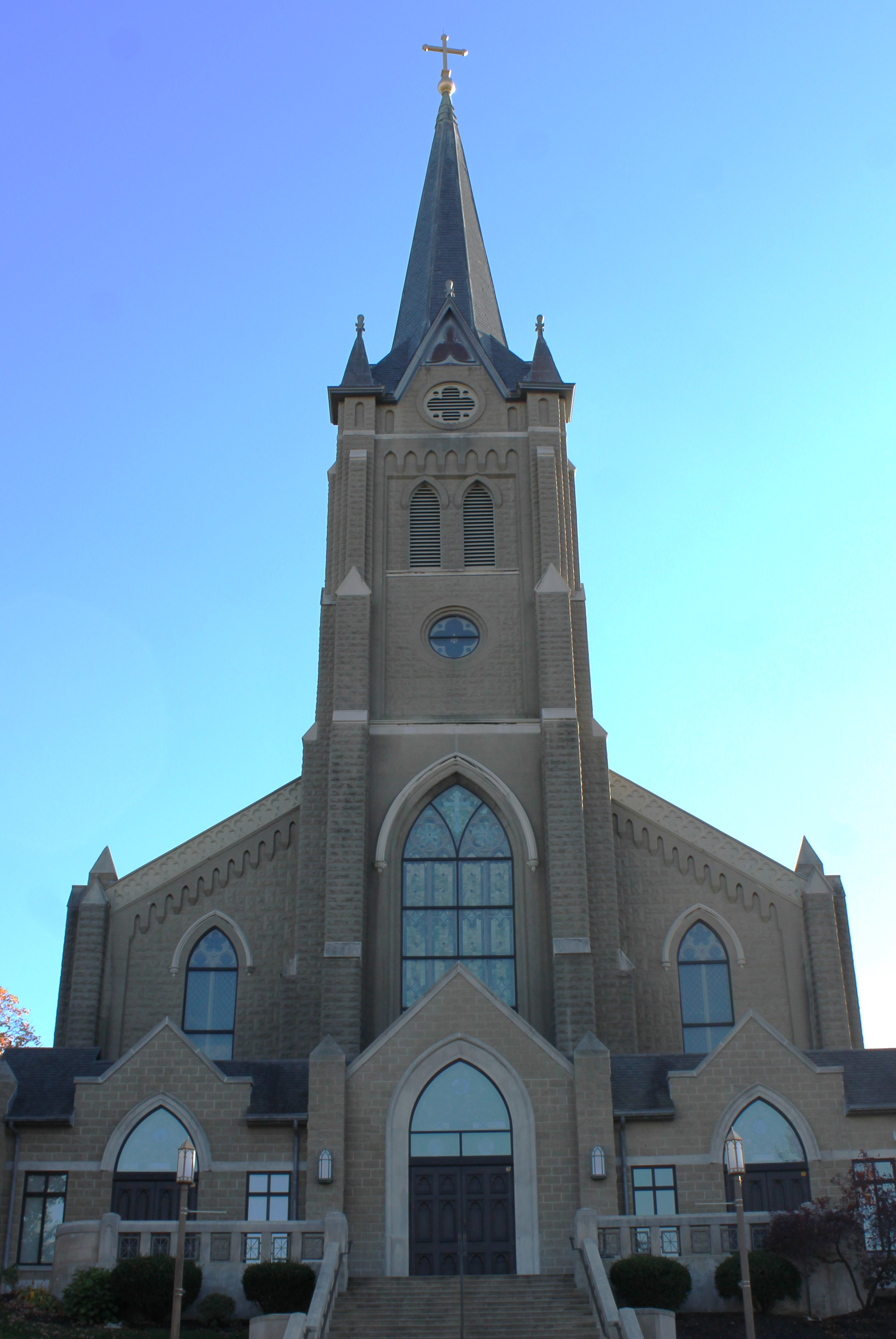
- St. Mary's Cathedral in 2023
- Cathedral of Saint Mary of the Immaculate Conception
- Location: 1207 Columbia St. Lafayette, Indiana
- Country: United States
- Denomination: Roman Catholic Church
- Website: www.saintmarycathedral.org

History
- Status: Cathedral/Parish
- Founded: 1843 (parish)
- Dedication: Immaculate Conception
- Dedicated: August 15, 1866

Architecture
- Functional status: Active
- Style: Gothic Revival
- Groundbreaking: 1861
- Completed: 1866

Specifications
- Materials: Brick/Concrete

Administration
- Diocese: Lafayette in Indiana

Clergy
- Bishop: Most Rev. Timothy Doherty
- Rector: Very Reverend Theodore C. Dudzinski, J.C.L.
- St. Mary's Cathedral
- U.S. Historic district – Contributing property
- Coordinates: 40°25′5″N 86°53′2″W
- Part of: St. Mary Historic District (ID01000622)
- Added to NRHP: June 14, 2001

The Cathedral of Saint Mary of the Immaculate Conception is the cathedral of the Roman Catholic Diocese of Lafayette in Indiana. It is located at 1207 Columbia Street in Lafayette, Indiana. It is also a contributing property in the St. Mary Historic District.

== History ==
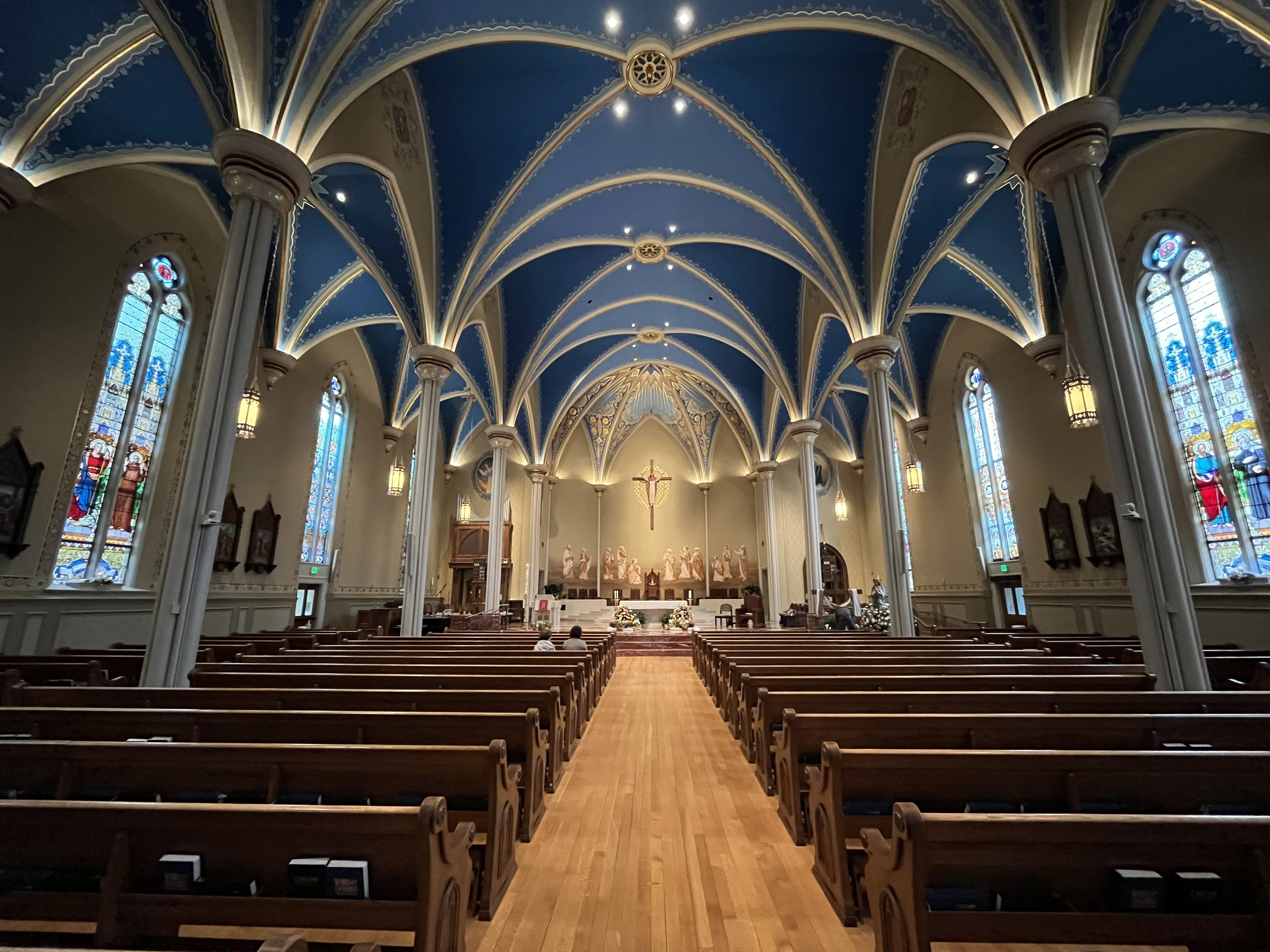
Cathedral interior in 2024

The congregation began in 1843 when a small group of Irish Catholic families in the area met for Mass in rented space. By the following year, they raised enough money to construct their own building. The brick Church of Sts. Mary and Martha stood at the intersection of Fifth and Brown Streets and was completed in 1846. In 1850, a school was constructed on adjacent land which came under the administration of the Oblate Sisters of Providence in 1858.

In 1860, parishioner Lawrence Stockton donated a plot of land on Columbia Street to the Reverend Edmund Kilroy for construction of a church, rectory, and school. Preliminary work began shortly thereafter, but stopped when the Civil War began in April 1861.

The Reverend George Hamilton replaced Father Kilroy as pastor and oversaw completion of construction. The Gothic-style church was dedicated August 15, 1866. The central tower rises to a height of 170 feet (52 m). The interior is divided into three naves by columns. The frescos and the stained glass windows were installed in 1887. The exterior was originally brick, but it was covered in 1904 with concrete to resemble stone. That same year, the front staircase and the balustrade were also completed.

In 1944, the Diocese of Lafayette-in-Indiana was created by dividing the Diocese of Fort Wayne and St. Mary's Church was chosen as the cathedral for the new diocese. The cathedral has undergone a number of renovations, three of which were mentioned in the 150th Anniversary documentary, in the years of 1933, 1976, and 2001 with the addition of a social hall.

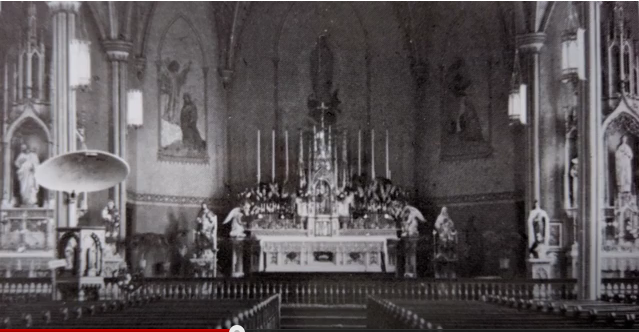
Original Look

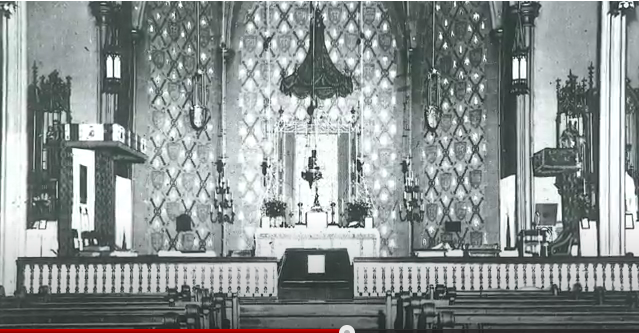
1933 Renovation

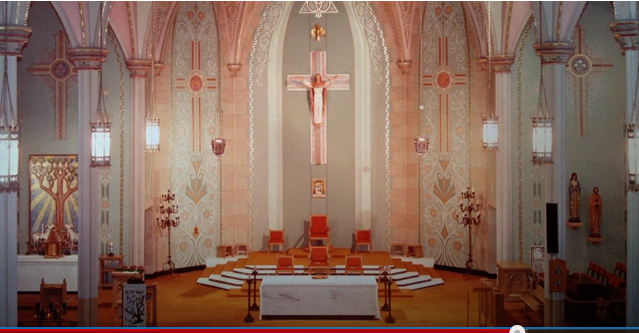
1976 Renovation

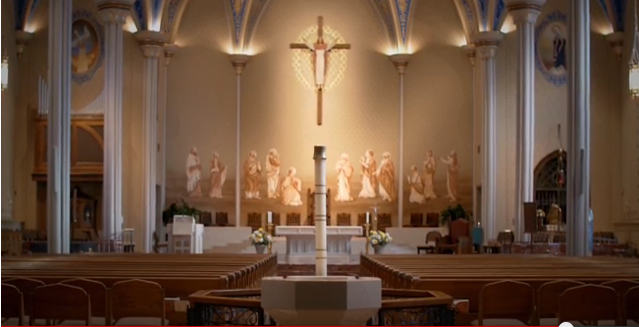
2001 Renovation (Current)

== See also ==
- List of Catholic cathedrals in the United States
- List of cathedrals in the United States
- St. Mary Historic District
