= St. Ambrose University =

Catholic university in Iowa, US

- Former names: St. Ambrose Academy (1882–1908); St. Ambrose College (1908–1987)
- Motto: Faith Learning Justice
- Type: Private university
- Established: 1882; 144 years ago
- Founder: John McMullen
- Religious affiliation: Catholic
- Endowment: $317 million (2026)
- Faculty: 350
- Administrative staff: 314
- Students: 2,747 (Fall 2022)
- Undergraduates: 2,118 (Fall 2022)
- Postgraduates: 629 (Fall 2022)
- Location: Davenport, Iowa, United States; 41.54°N 90.58°W
- Campus: Urban area, 177 acres (72 ha)
- Colors: Ambrose Blue & White
- Nickname: Fighting Bees
- Sporting affiliations: NAIA – CCAC (primary); NAIA – HAAC (football, men's and women's lacrosse, wrestling); NACE (esports)
- Website: www.sau.edu

St. Ambrose University (SAU) is a private Catholic university in Davenport, Iowa, United States. It was founded as a school of commerce for young men in 1882.

== History ==
=== Foundation ===
St. Ambrose was founded as a seminary and school of commerce for young men in 1882, known as St. Ambrose Academy. It owes its beginning to the first Bishop of Davenport, John McMullen, who founded it under the auspices of the Diocese of Davenport. The affiliation remains strong today.

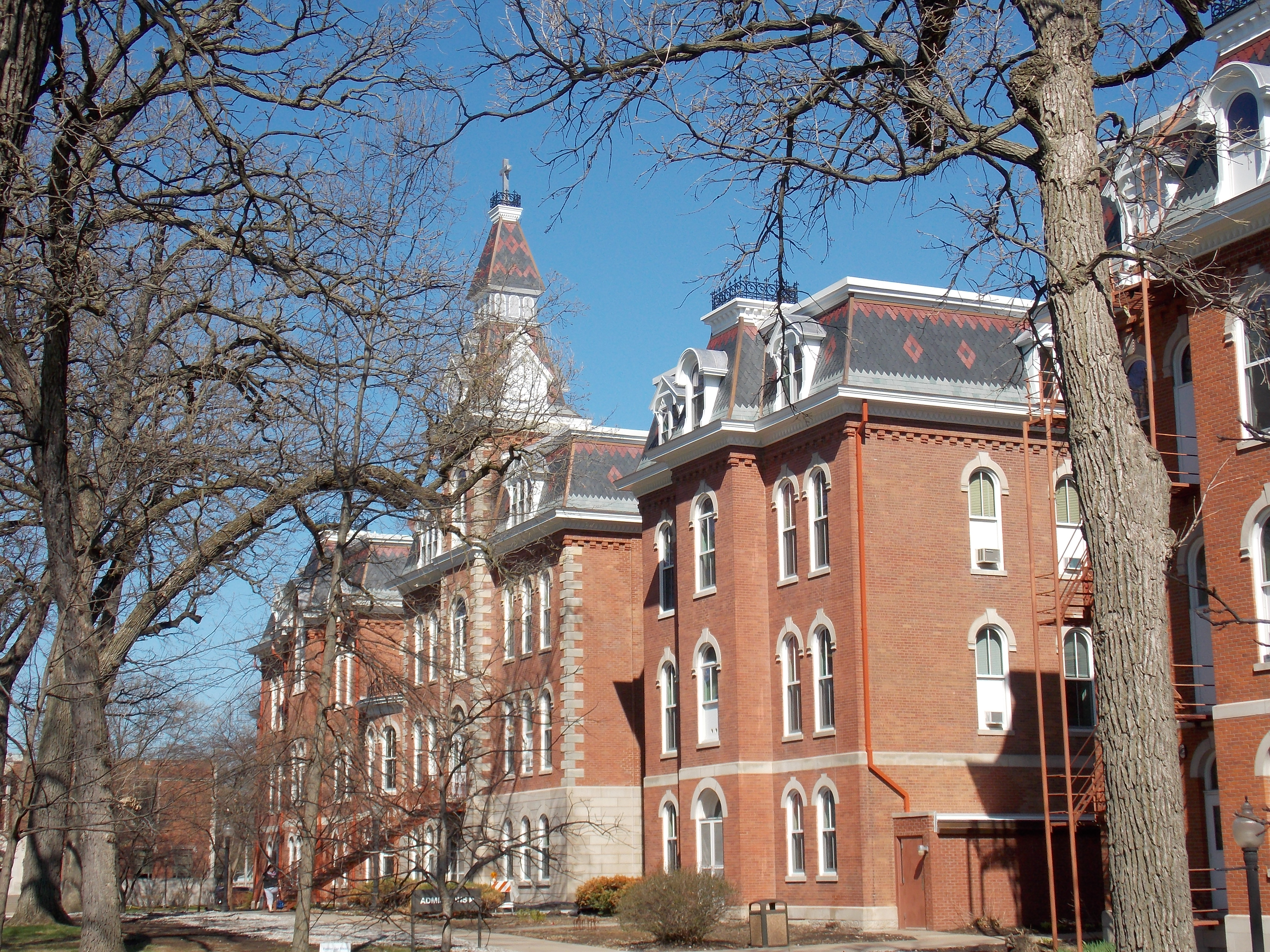
Ambrose Hall

For its first three years, classes were held in two rooms of the old St. Marguerite's School, located on the grounds of what is now Sacred Heart Cathedral in Davenport. McMullen died of cancer in 1883, and Aloysius Schulte was named the first president of St. Ambrose at the age of 23.

The school was moved to Locust Street in 1885, where the central part of the present-day Ambrose Hall was built. Located in a secluded grove of oak trees, the site was far removed from the city. That same year, St. Ambrose was incorporated as "a literary, scientific and religious institution." The articles of incorporation stated, "No particular religious faith shall be required of any person to entitle him to admission to said seminary."

By the start of the 20th century, a clearer division was being made between the high school academy and the college program. In 1908, the name of the institution was officially changed to St. Ambrose College to express the institution's mission. Night school classes were inaugurated in 1924, and the first session of summer school was held in 1931.

During World War II, the United States Navy chose St. Ambrose College as a location for the training of many officers. For a short time, regular classes ceased, and the campus became a training ground for the Navy's V-12 squads.

=== St. Ambrose Academy ===
The high school program, St. Ambrose Academy, was founded at the same time as the college and housed in the college's buildings. From 1886 to 1931 some of the academy students were boarded on the campus.

=== Growth ===
In 1968, St. Ambrose became fully coeducational, although women had been taking classes on campus ever since the 1930s.

St. Ambrose began offering graduate classes in 1977 with the H.L. McLaughlin Master of Business Administration program. Its graduate offerings have since expanded to 14 programs.

On April 23, 1987, St. Ambrose College became St. Ambrose University at the direction of the board of directors. The university was organized into the colleges of Business, Human Services (now Health and Human Services), and Arts and Sciences.

In 1997, St. Ambrose began offering its first doctoral program, the Doctor of Business Administration (DBA).

In May 2024, the university announced a partnership with fellow Catholic institution Mount Mercy University in Cedar Rapids that would allow students from both institutions to freely take classes at them. At the time of the announcement, a merger was "being explored for the future." Three months later, in August 2024, it was announced that the university would merge with Mount Mercy.

== Students and faculty ==
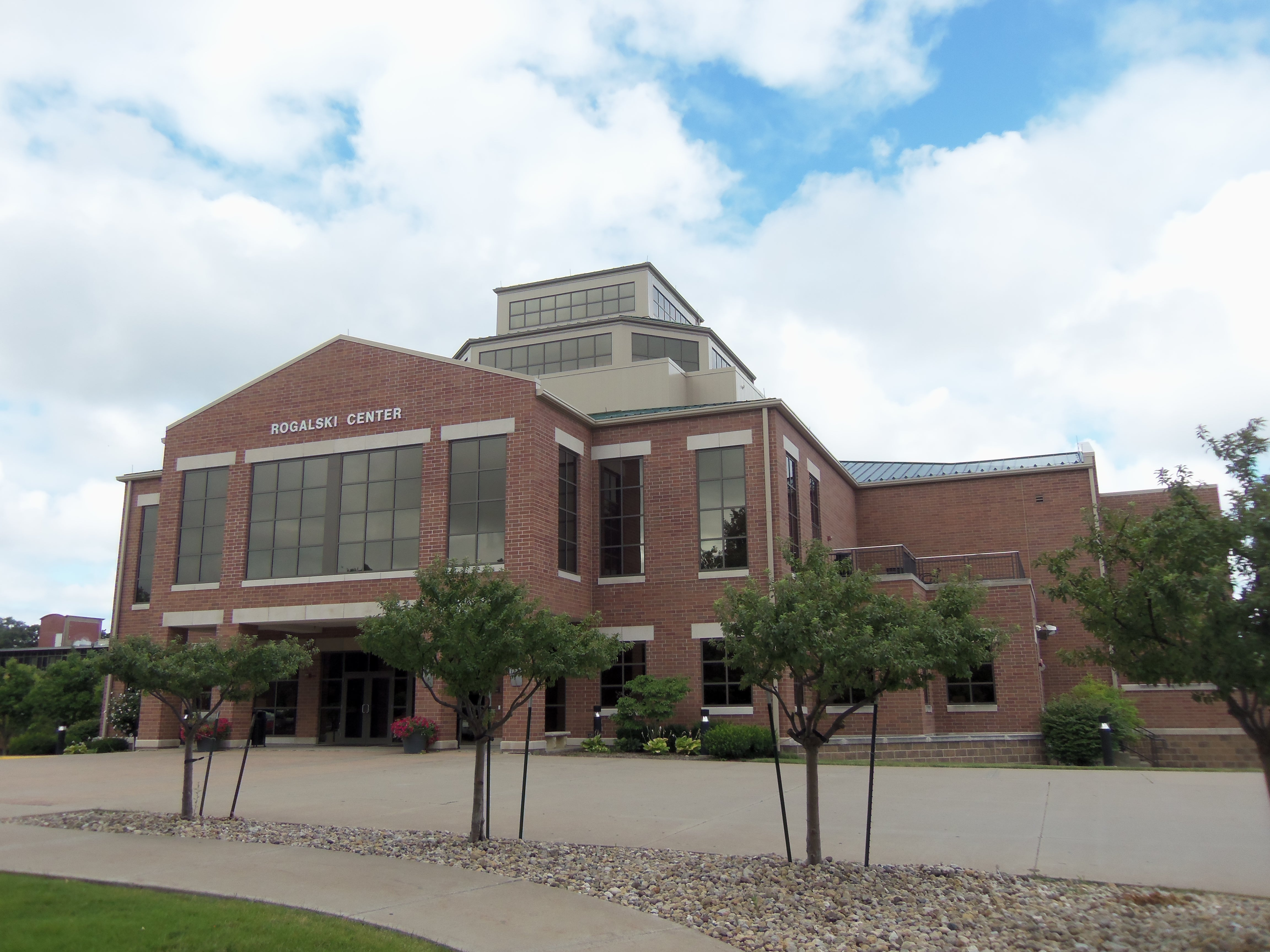
Rogalski Center

The university enrolls 2,916 students, as of Fall 2021. 2,231 of these students were undergraduates and 685 were graduate students. The student body is approximately 58 percent female, and 89 percent are full-time students. More than 16 percent of students identify themselves as belonging to a minority group.

The university employs 335 faculty members and 270 staff. The student-faculty ratio is approximately 12 to 1 with an average class size of 20 students.

Sr. Joan Lescinski, CSJ replaced Dr. Edward Rogalski as president in 2007, becoming the first woman to hold that office.

Amy C. Novak, EdD, became the 14th president of the university on Saturday, August 7, 2021, succeeding Sr. Joan Lescinski, CSJ after 14 years as the president of St. Ambrose University.

== Academics ==
St. Ambrose University offers more than 60 undergraduate majors(includes pre-professional like Medical, Dental, Law, Chiropractic, Physical Therapy, Physician's Assistant, Optometry, Pharmacy and Veterinary Medicine), 11 master's, and three doctoral programs offered through the colleges of Arts and Sciences, Business, and Health and Human Services. Notable programs include one of the only Master of Occupational Therapy programs leading to a registered occupational therapist degree in the state of Iowa. Additionally, pass rates on the National Physical Therapy Examination are consistently high; the two-year average rate is 97%.

There are 11 master's degree programs and three doctoral programs: physical therapy, occupational therapy and business administration.

There are Study Abroad Programs for Fall and spring semesters, winter and May interim, and summer programs offered in more than 40 countries.

== Accreditation ==
St. Ambrose University is accredited by the Higher Learning Commission. In its 2017-18 review, the Commission recommended a 10-year approval for St. Ambrose.

=== Specialized accreditations ===
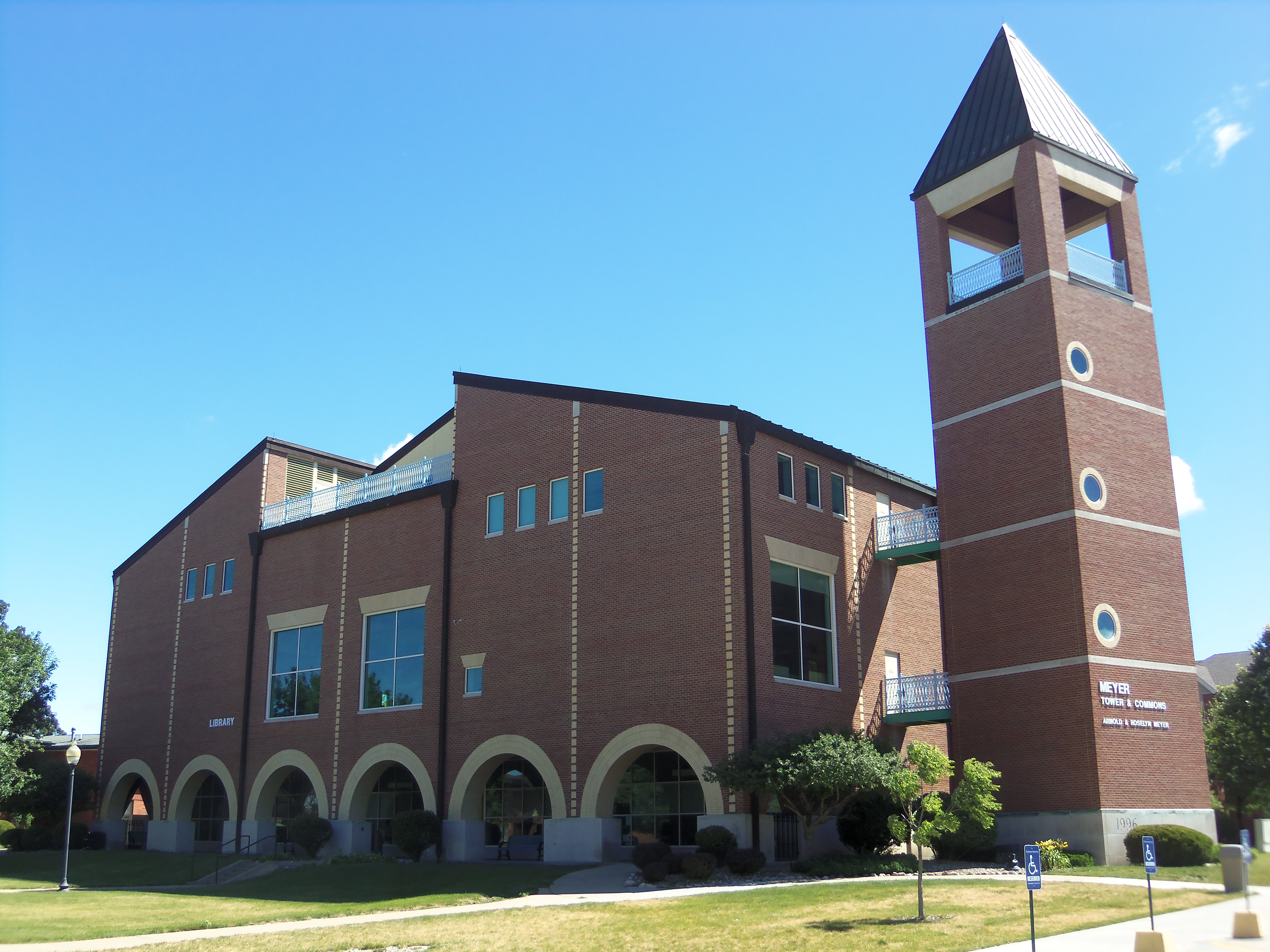
St. Ambrose University Library

==== Patricia VanBruwaene College of Business ====
Through its accreditation by the Accreditation Council for Business Schools and Programs, the College of Business also has accredited undergraduate, graduate, and organizational leadership programs.

The college was named the Patricia VanBruwaene College of Business on April 7, 2022, through the Patricia VanBruwaene estate.

==== Education ====
Iowa Department of Education – Teacher Education Accreditation Council (TEAC)
Children's Campus – National Association for the Education of Young Children (NAEYC).

==== Industrial engineering ====
The Engineering Accreditation Commission of the Accreditation Board of Engineering and Technology

==== Mechanical engineering ====
The Engineering Accreditation Commission of the Accreditation Board of Engineering and Technology

==== Nursing ====
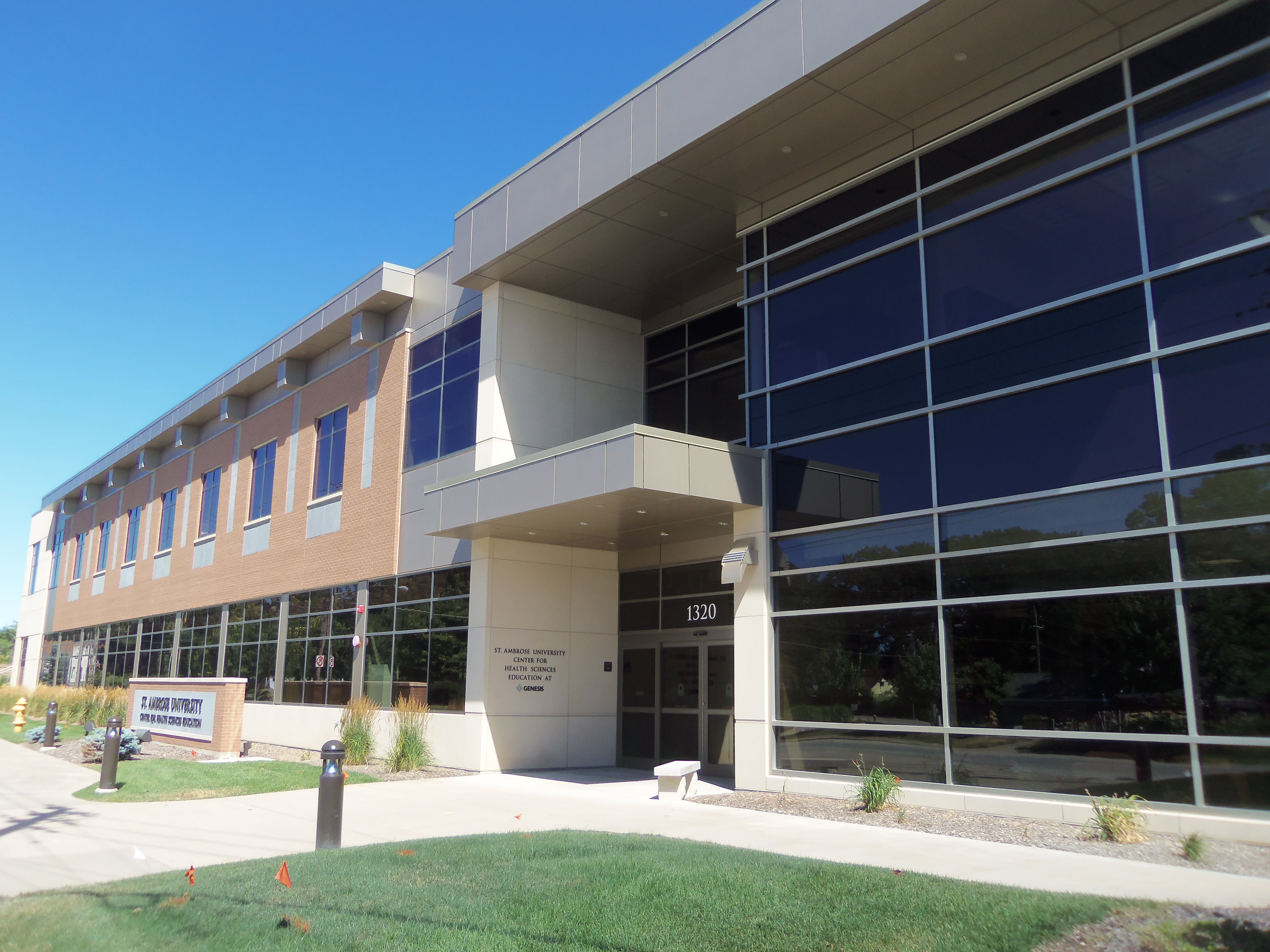
Health Sciences Building

Commission on Collegiate Nursing Education (CCNE)
The Iowa Board of Nursing

==== Occupational therapy ====
Accreditation Council for Occupational Therapy Education (ACOTE) of the American Occupational Therapy Association (AOTA)

==== Physical therapy ====
Commission on Accreditation in Physical Therapy Education (CAPTE) of the American Physical Therapy Association (APTA)

==== Public health ====
Council on Education for Public Health (CEPH)

==== Social work ====
Council on Social Work Education (CSWE)

==== Speech language pathology ====
Council on Academic Accreditation of American Speech-Language Hearing Association (ASHA) 2019–2027.

==== Physician assistant studies ====
Accreditation-provision status by the ARC-PA

== Rankings ==
In 2021, St. Ambrose University was labeled a "College of Distinction". That same year, U.S. News & World Report ranked St. Ambrose University 27th for Regional Universities Midwest out of a region of 12 states. It also named the university 19th in the nation for Best Colleges for Veterans due to helping veterans and active duty service members pay for their degrees and 32nd overall in the nation for overall value (calculated by 2019-2020 net cost of attendance).

In 2021, The Princeton Review ranked the university in their Best of the Midwest section of its "2021 Best Colleges Region by Region".

== Athletics ==
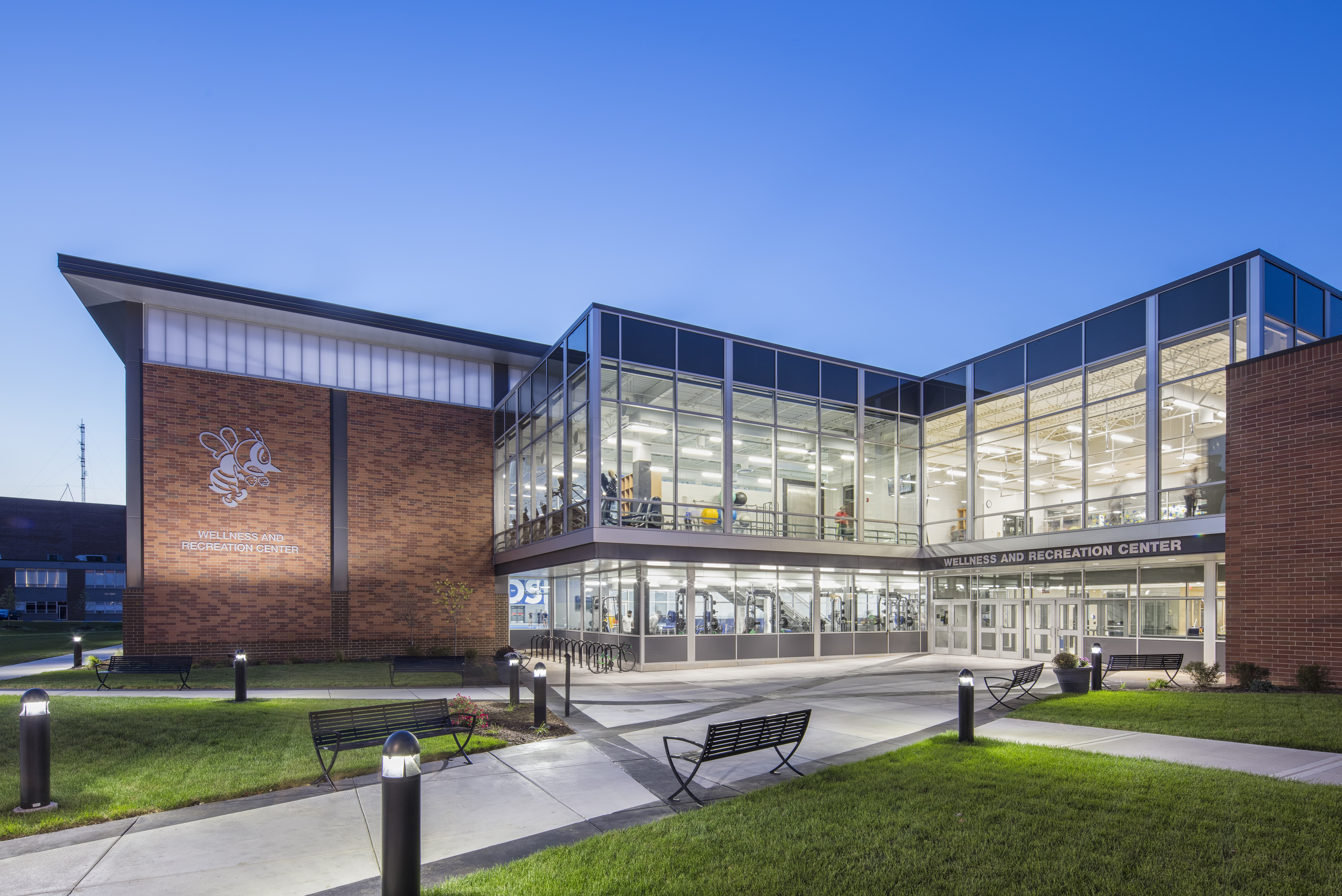
Wellness and Recreation Center

The St. Ambrose athletic teams are called the Fighting Bees. The university is a member of the National Association of Intercollegiate Athletics (NAIA), primarily competing in the Chicagoland Collegiate Athletic Conference (CCAC) for most of its sports since the 2015–16 academic year. Meanwhile, its football team has competed in the Midwest League of the Mid-States Football Association (MSFA) since 1996 but announced in 2023 that they will move to the Heart of America Athletic Conference (HAAC) in 2024 as an associate member, just as its men's wrestling team has been since 2021. Its men's & women's lacrosse teams compete in the Kansas Collegiate Athletic Conference (KCAC), and its men's and women's eSports teams compete in the National Association of Collegiate Esports (NACE). The Fighting Bees previously competed in the defunct Midwest Collegiate Conference (MCC) from 1990–91 to 2014–15 (when the conference dissolved).

St. Ambrose competes in 28 intercollegiate varsity sports: Men's sports include baseball, basketball, bowling, cross country, football, golf, lacrosse, soccer, swimming & diving, tennis, track & field, volleyball and wrestling. Women's sports include basketball, bowling, cross country, dance, golf, lacrosse, soccer, softball, swimming & diving, tennis, track & field and volleyball. Co-ed sports include cheerleading, eSports and marching bands.

== Architecture ==
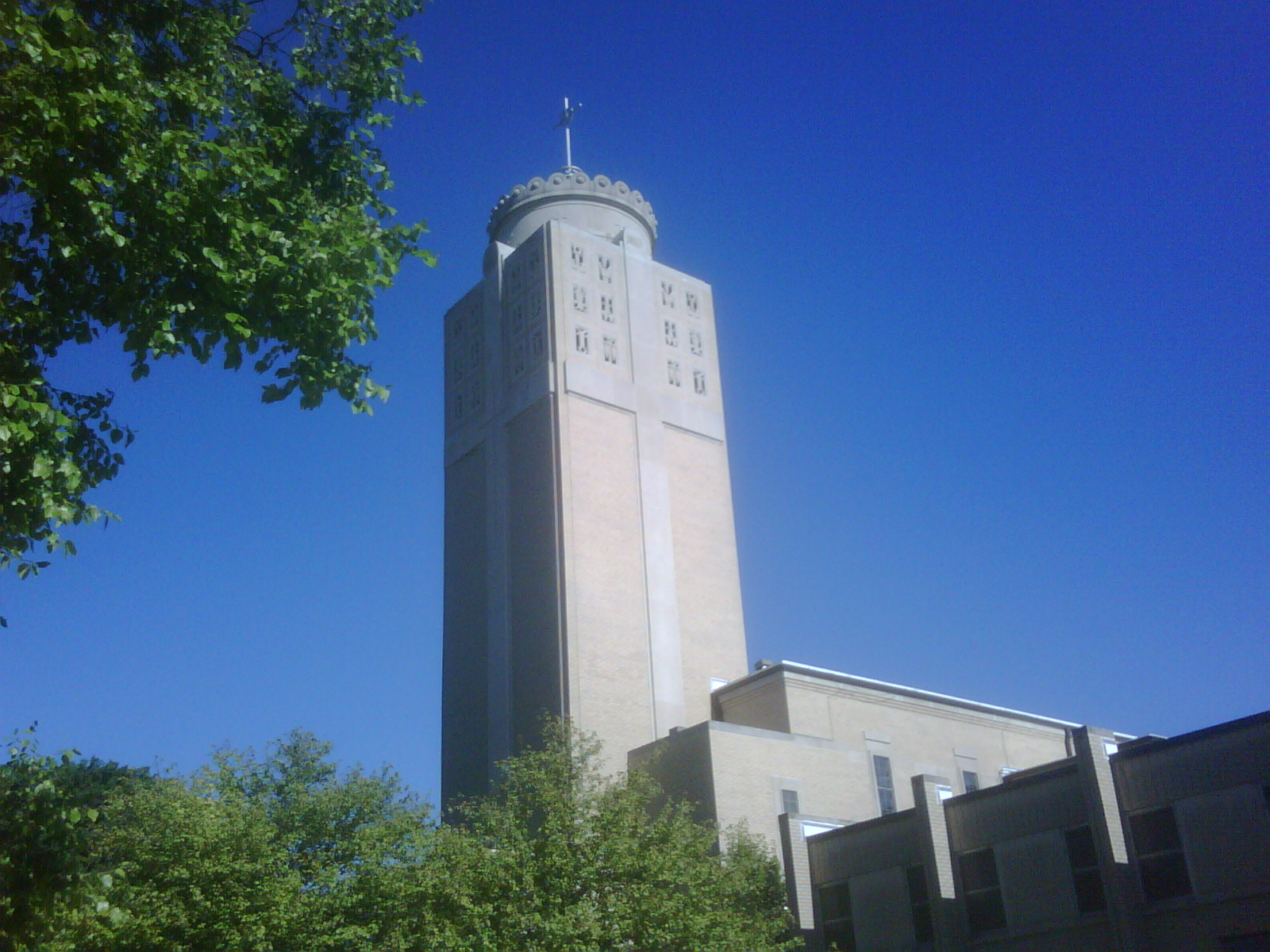
Christ the King Chapel

- Ambrose Hall, designed by Victor Huot, is the oldest building on campus and is listed on the National Register of Historic Places.
- Alumni House, located off campus on the corner of Brady Street and Kirkwood Boulevard and houses the offices of Alumni and Advancement, is listed on the National Register of Historic Places.
- The Rogalski Center, constructed in 2004, houses a food court, bookstore, ballroom, and administrative offices, among others. Its function is comparable to that of a student union building.
- Christ the King Chapel, designed by Cincinnati architect Edward J. Schulte, has a prominent tower of white brick and was built in 1952. It underwent a $5.2 million renovation in 2007.
- The St. Ambrose University Library was designed in 1995 by Evans Woollen of Woollen, Molzan and Partners. The library was opened in March 1996.

== Campus media ==
KALA (FM) (88.5FM/106.1 FM) This 350 watt public format, non-profit radio station located on campus in the Galvin Fine Arts Center, broadcasts throughout the quad-cities. The varied format of the station, includes local and national news, information and entertainment from Public Radio and from Public Radio International. The music format includes mainstream and fusion jazz, blues, roots, gospel, Latin, classic rock, oldies, pop music, urban contemporary and classic R&B. KALA is also affiliated with the syndicated Pink Floyd program Floydian Slip. The station also covers "live" radio programs such as SAU campus news, a local calendar of events, daily weather updates, and student run radio shows. A mainstay of the station's commitment to the university community is its live home/remote coverage of St. Ambrose University sports events. This includes SAU's Fighting Bees/Queen Bees basketball, football, and baseball games.

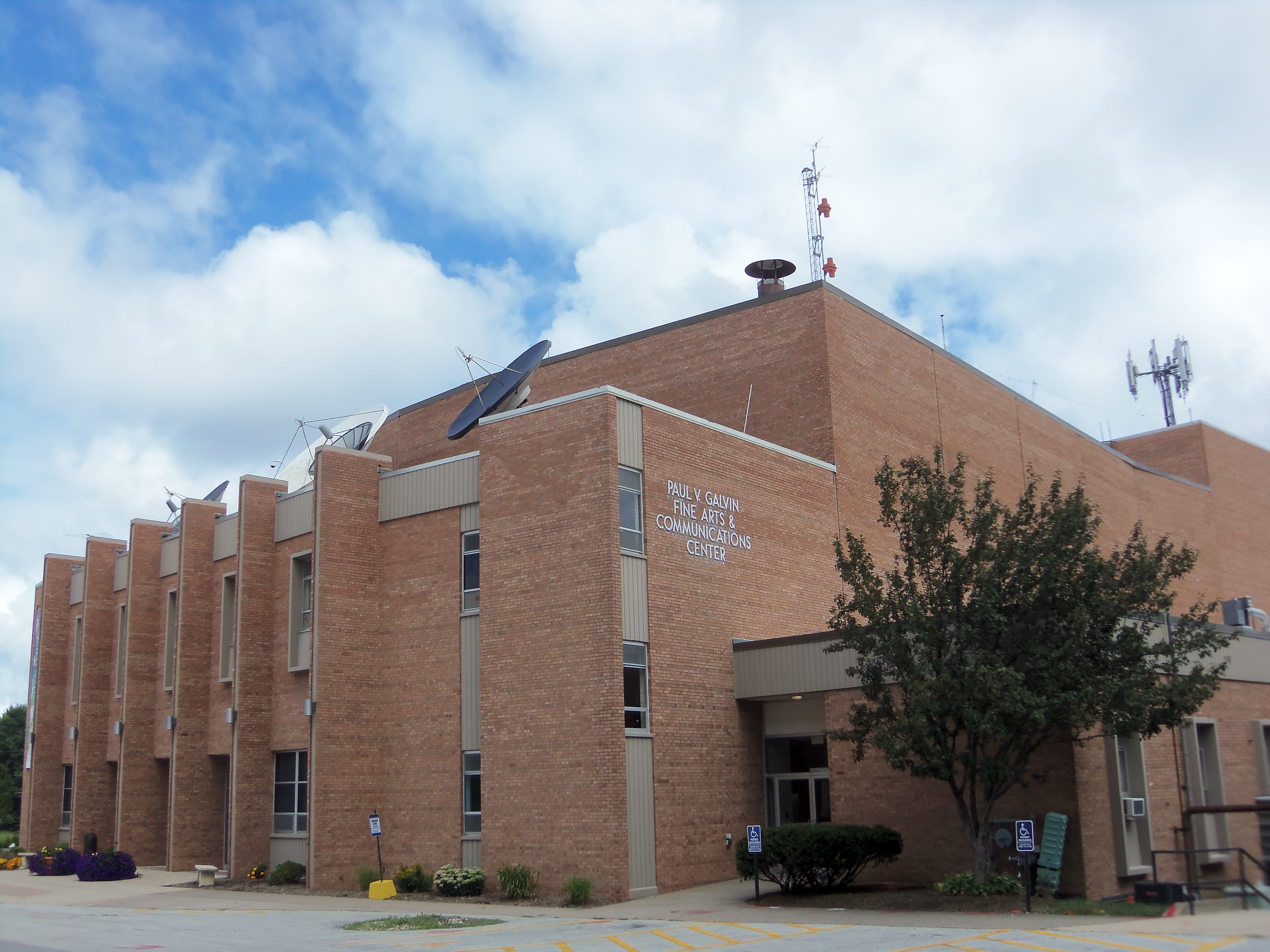
Paul V. Galvin Fine Arts Center

SAUtv is the television outlet of the St. Ambrose University Communication Center. On-line, program channeling and student run content is broadcast throughout the Quad-city area on the local cable channel. This includes Dateline SAU, The Ray Shovlain Show, The Krista Van Hauen Show and the Mike Magistrelli Show. The Station and individual student broadcasters have gone on to win awards due to the quality of their content from the Iowa Broadcast Network Association (IBNA). SAUtv also has live coverage of St. Ambrose University sports, including Fighting Bee and Queen Bee basketball, football and baseball games.

== Notable alumni ==
- Lon Adams (1925–2020), creator of the Slim Jim.
- William Lawrence Adrian, (April 16, 1883 – February 13, 1972), bishop
- Gene Baker (June 15, 1925 – December 1, 1999) baseball player
- James Mark Beckman (born 1962) bishop
- Joe Bolkcom (born July 29, 1956) politician
- Dan Brady (born July 4, 1961), politician
- Vis Brown (born November 2, 1975) actor
- Edward Catich (1906–1979) priest and calligrapher.
- David Choby, bishop
- Kim Clarke handball player
- Duffy Conroy basketball coach
- Abbey Curran, beauty pageant contestant
- Maurice John Dingman (January 20, 1914 – February 1, 1992) bishop
- Timothy Doherty (born September 29, 1950), bishop
- Thomas A. Dunn, politician
- John H. Ebersole (January 26, 1925 – September 23, 1993) radiologist
- Jim Finigan (August 19, 1928 – May 16, 1981) baseball player
- David L. Gross (1940), historian
- Robert Dwayne Gruss (born June 25, 1955) bishop
- Ulrich Hauber (June 28, 1885 – July 1, 1956) president of St. Ambrose College
- Lester Hearden, American football player
- Thomas J. Hennen, (born July 4, 1978) bishop
- Sam Hoger, Mixed martial arts player
- Waddy Kuehl (February 12, 1893 – July 24, 1967), American football player
- Ted Lapka (April 20, 1920 – December 1, 2011), American football player
- Cletus Madsen, music teacher
- James Conroyd Martin, historical fiction author
- Pat McMahon (born 1933), actor
- Bernard F. Meyer, (June 16, 1891 – May 8, 1975) missionary
- Art Michalik American football player
- Rocky Miller (born October 22, 1965), politician
- Marvin Mottet (May 31, 1930 – September 16, 2016) priest
- Michael Ohioze track and field athlete
- Gene Osborn, broadcaster
- James Philbrook (October 22, 1924—October 24, 1982), actor
- Robin Pingeton, basketball coach
- Stephen A. Roell, business executive
- Lawrence Donald Soens (1926–2021), bishop
- Michael St. Angel (1916–1984), actor
- Darrell Steffensmeier (born 1942), criminologist
- Jamie Van Fossen (born May 5, 1960), politician
- Marcos Villatoro, writer
- Robert M. Wolterstorff, bishop
- Dave Zuidmulder, American football player
- Elizabeth Hamilton Guarino, model and author.

== See also ==
- Saint Ambrose
- Finlandia Hymn
- KALA (FM)
