= St. Matthew Cathedral (South Bend, Indiana) =

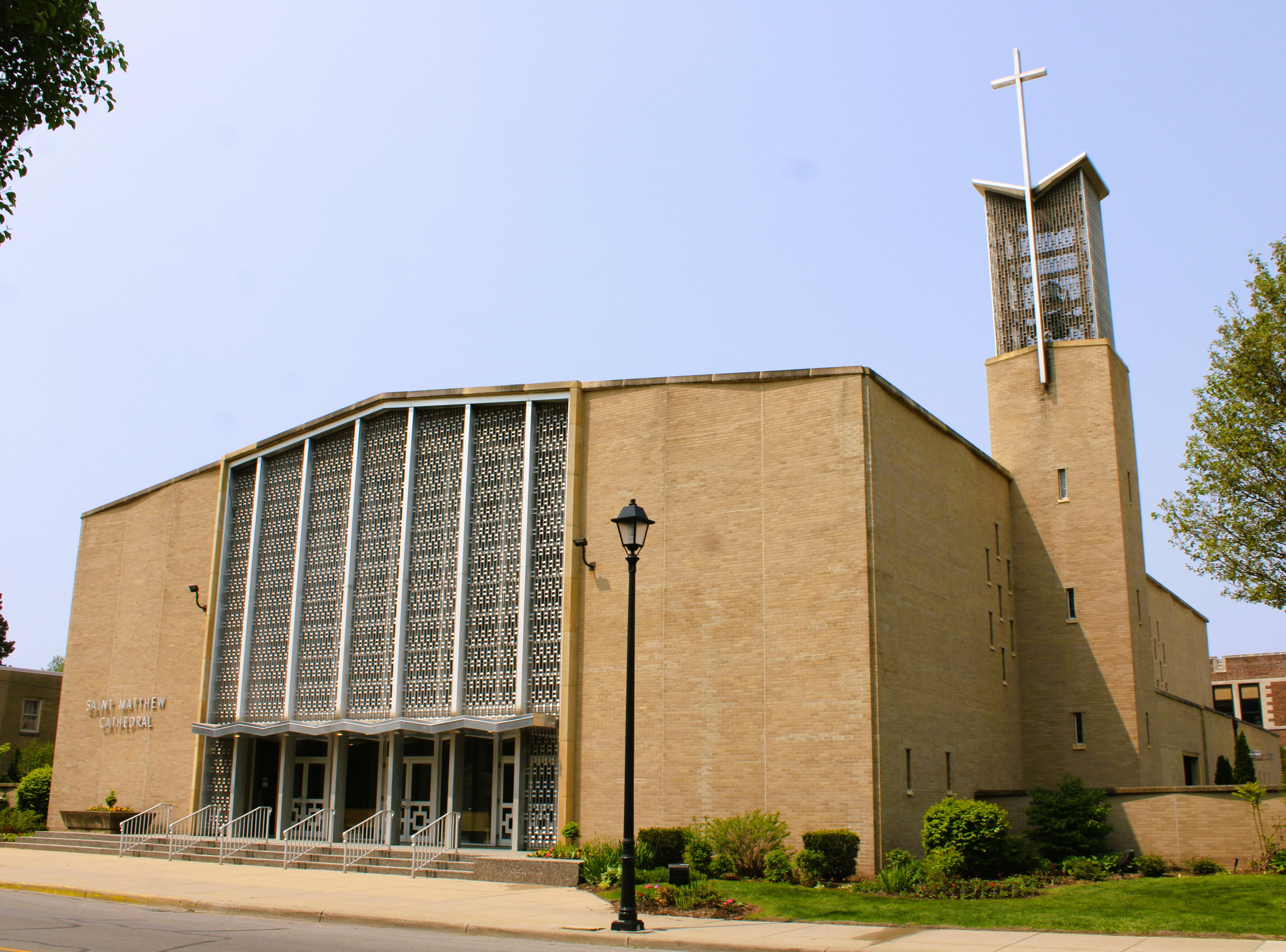
- St. Matthew Cathedral in 2023
- St. Matthew Cathedral
- 41°39′24″N 86°14′08″W
- Location: 1701 Miami Street; South Bend, Indiana
- Country: United States
- Denomination: Roman Catholic Church
- Website: www.stmatthewcathedral.org

History
- Founded: 1922

Architecture
- Style: Modern
- Groundbreaking: 1959
- Completed: 1960

Specifications
- Materials: Brick

Administration
- Diocese: Fort Wayne-South Bend

Clergy
- Bishop: Most Rev. Kevin C. Rhoades
- Rector: Rev. Andrew Budzinski

St. Matthew Cathedral is a Catholic cathedral in South Bend, Indiana, United States. Along with Cathedral of the Immaculate Conception in Fort Wayne, it is the seat of the Diocese of Fort Wayne-South Bend.

== History ==
=== St. Matthew Parish ===
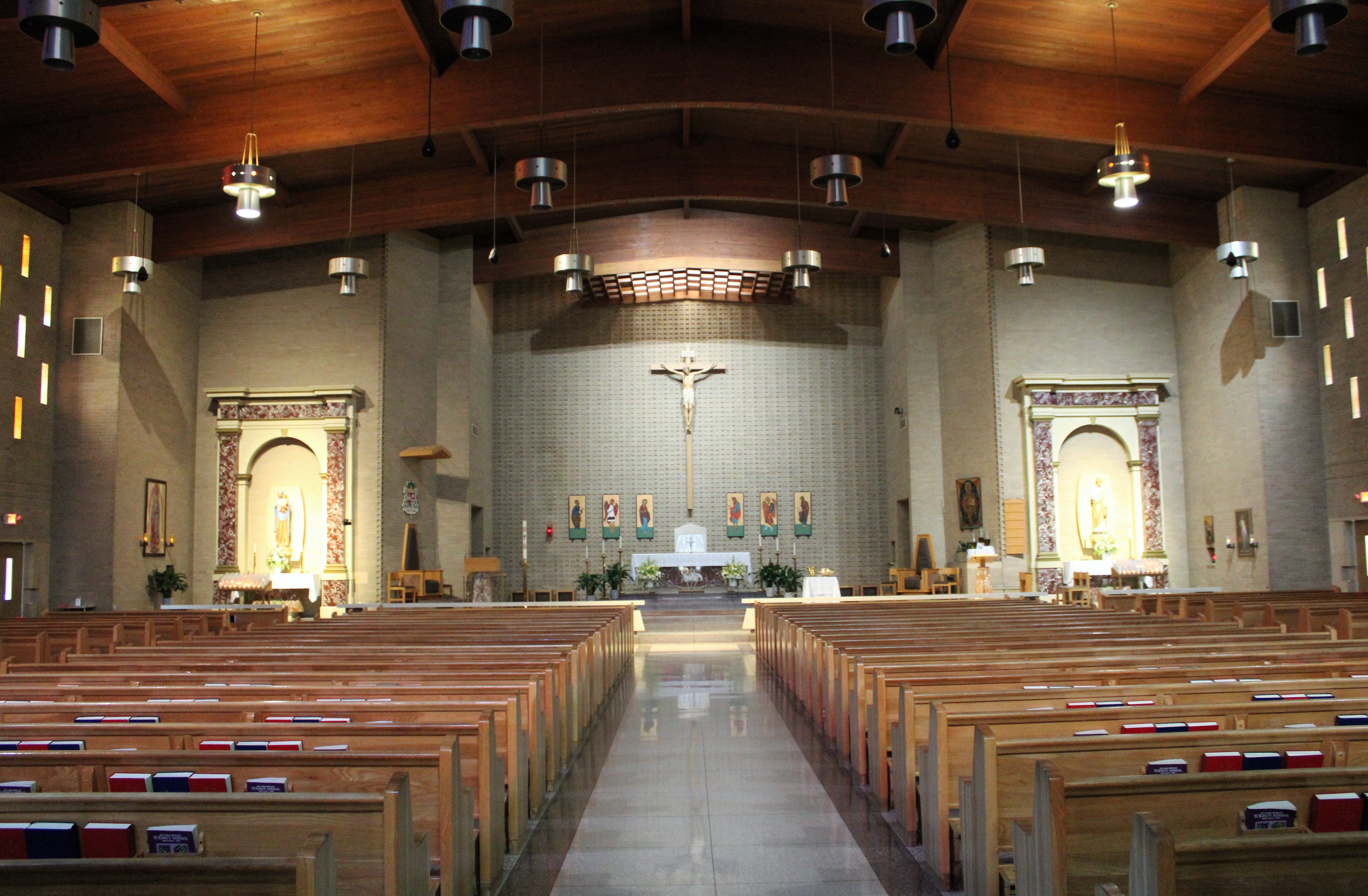
Cathedral interior

The Rev. John DeGroote bought 14 lots in the Oak Park addition of South Bend in 1921. Initial plans called for a building to house a combined church and school, but because the estimated cost of $35,000 was considered too expensive, Bishop Herman Alerding suggested a more modest wooden structure to serve temporarily as a church. The Rev. Theodore Hammes was appointed as the parish's first pastor and initially lived at St. Monica's parish in Mishawaka. Twenty-two men volunteered to help build the church, which was constructed in May 1922 for $10,000. The sanctuary was dedicated August 13, 1922, with a parish hall in the basement. The congregation quickly outgrew the structure's capacity of 240, and in October 1923, church leaders dedicated an expansion that increased the seating capacity to 600. The parish purchased six additional lots in 1924 which became the site of a school in 1929.

The Missionary Sisters of Our Lady of Victory arrived at St. Matthew in 1942 and stayed until 1958. They taught religious education to the children who did not attend the parish school and performed other duties. The current rectory opened in 1954 to replace a small house that was no longer adequate and soon after, in 1959, ground was broken for the current church. The old church was demolished; however, the bells were stored to become part of the new church.

=== St. Matthew Cathedral ===
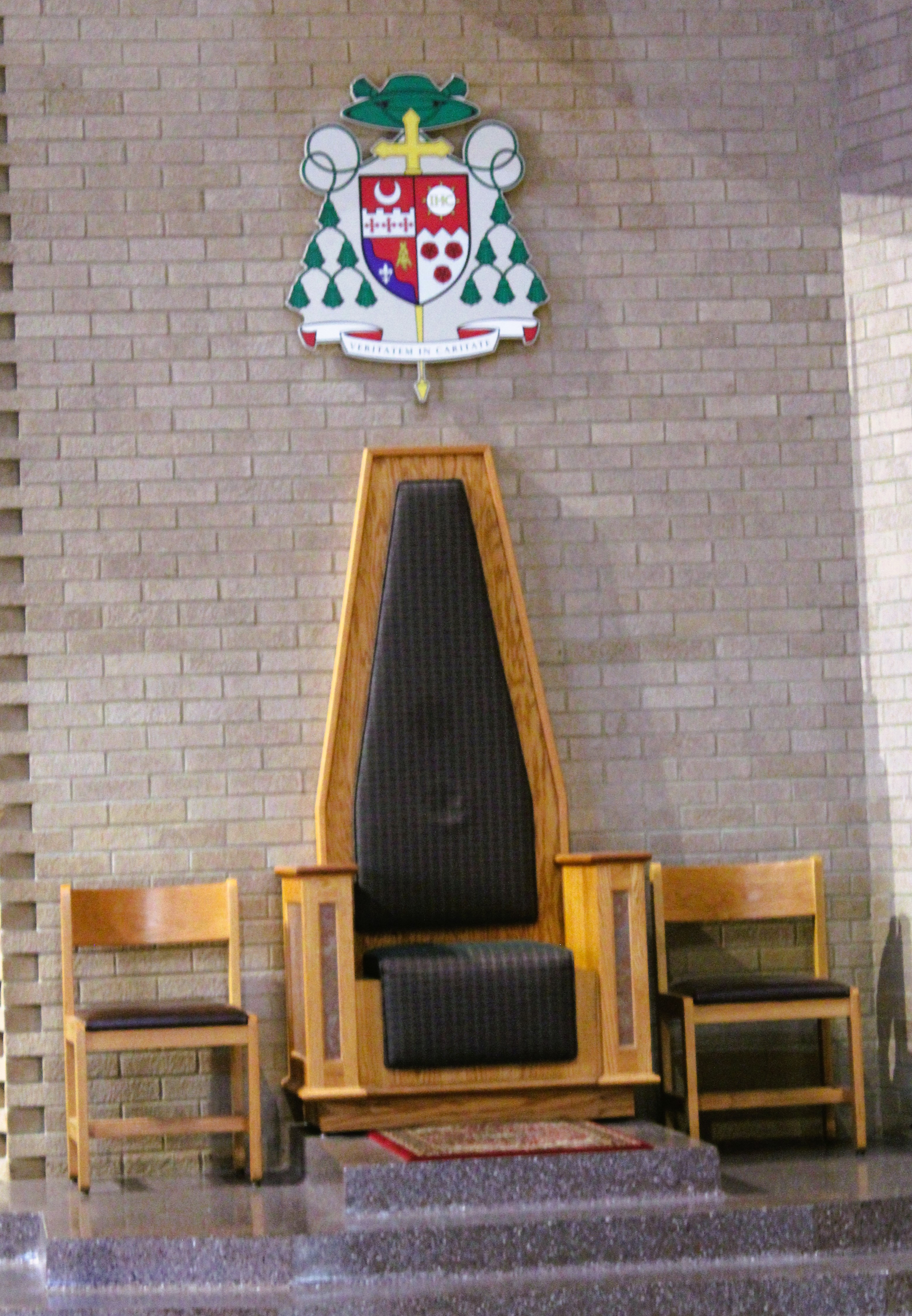
Cathedra

In 1960, Pope John XXIII changed the name of the Diocese of Fort Wayne to the Diocese of Fort Wayne-South Bend. St. Matthew Church, which was still under construction, was named Co-cathedral for the diocese.

Msgr. Joseph R. Crowley became pastor of St. Matthew in 1969 and on August 24, 1971, was named auxiliary bishop for the diocese. After his ordination as bishop, he assumed the post of diocesan director of religious education, but two years later, returned to St. Matthew as pastor. He was to be the first of three auxiliary bishops to serve the parish consecutively as its pastor.

In 1989, the parish choir, under the direction of Dr. Edward Kline, was invited to sing at the Vatican. In 1992, the campus grew again with the opening of the Cathedral Center and a day care center in the former convent. The day care center expanded into another building that the parish purchased in 1994. Bishop Daniel R. Jenky, C.S.C., who became pastor in 1997, left the parish in 2002 to become Bishop of Peoria.

== Catholic schools ==
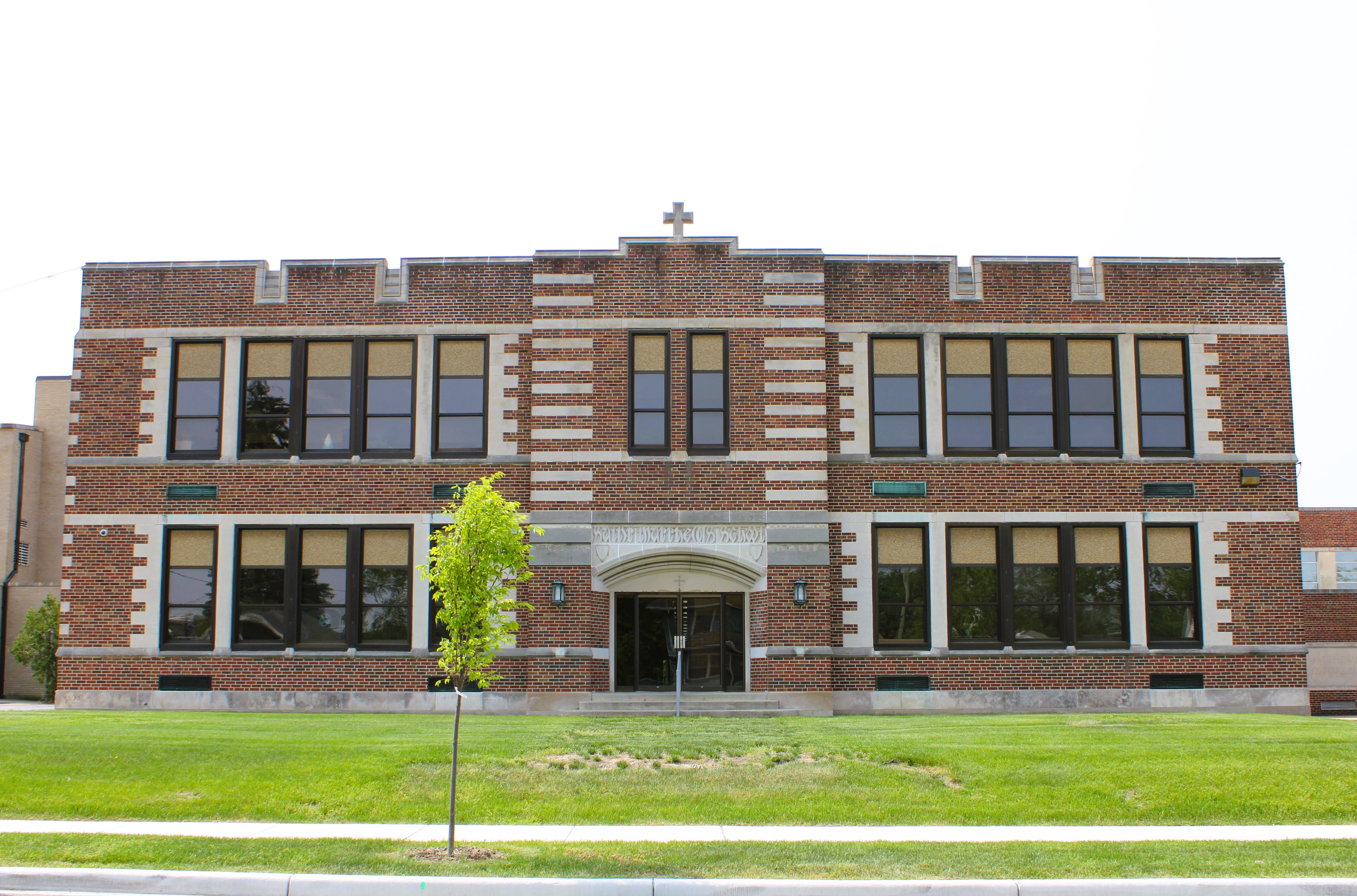
St. Matthew Cathedral School

Construction of St. Matthew School began on May 15, 1929, and Bishop John F. Noll dedicated the structure, which cost $167,000, on October 13, 1929. Enrollment the first year was 150 students in five grades taught by the Sisters of St. Joseph. The school expanded by one grade each year until 1932.

In 1934, the Brothers of the Holy Cross opened Central Catholic High School with 18 students on the second floor of the school building. As the enrollment increased, the brothers added additional classrooms and athletic programs. Tuition in the early years was $40. The number of brothers on the faculty increased which also grew to include a layperson, who taught biology and coached the athletic teams. Professors from the University of Notre Dame also taught at the school. The school's largest enrollment was 237 boys; however, it was unable to withstand changes in the neighborhood and closed in 1951 when three Catholic schools merged to create St. Joseph High School.

After Central Catholic left St. Matthew School expanded into the space. The parish added a new gymnasium in 1955 and significantly renovated the older building during the pastorate of Bishop Jenky.

== Pastors and rectors ==
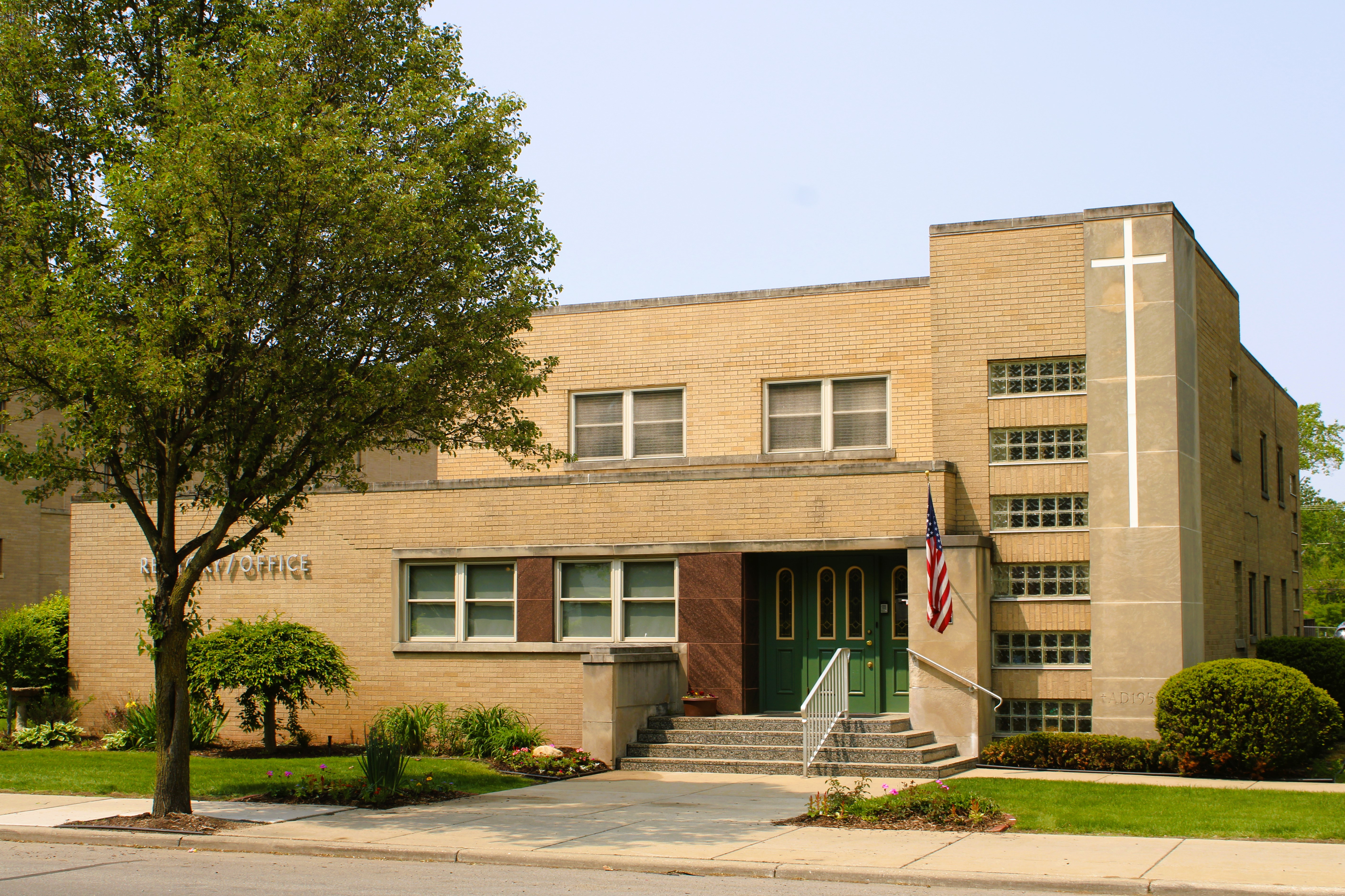
Rectory/Parish Office

The following priests have served as pastors of St. Matthew's parish and, after 1960, as the cathedral rector:

- Rev. Theodore Hammes (1921–1933)
- Msgr. Arnold J. Wibbert (1933–1969)
- Bishop Joseph R. Crowley (1969–1991)
- Bishop John R. Sheets, SJ (1991–1997)
- Bishop Daniel R. Jenky, C.S.C. (1997–2002)
- Msgr. Michael Heintz (2002–2016)
- Rev. Terry Fisher (2016–2023)
- Rev. Andrew Budzinski (2023–present)

== See also ==
- List of Catholic cathedrals in the United States
- List of cathedrals in the United States
