= Joseph Robert Crowley =

Most Reverend Joseph R. Crowley
- Auxiliary Bishop of Fort Wayne-South Bend
- Church: Catholic Church
- See: Titular See of Maraguia
- Appointed: June 16, 1971
- In office: August 24, 1971 - May 8, 1990

Orders
- Ordination: May 1, 1953 by John F. Noll
- Consecration: August 24, 1971 by George Biskup

Personal details
- Born: January 12, 1915 Fort Wayne, Indiana
- Died: February 4, 2003 (aged 88) South Bend, Indiana

Joseph Robert Crowley (January 12, 1915 – February 4, 2003) was an American Bishop of the Catholic Church. He served as auxiliary bishop of the Diocese of Fort Wayne-South Bend from 1971–1990.

== Biography ==
Born in Fort Wayne, Indiana, Joseph Crowley worked for five years at People's Trust and Savings Company in Fort Wayne. He served in the U.S. Army Air Corps during World War II serving in both the North African and European campaigns. He attained the rank of captain. He was ordained a priest for the Diocese of Fort Wayne-South Bend by Bishop John F. Noll on May 1, 1953. As a priest he served at St. Peter's Church in Fort Wayne, St. Francis Xavier Church in Pierceton, St. Patrick's Church in Lagro, St. Joseph's Church in Fort Wayne and St. Matthew's Cathedral in South Bend. He also served on the diocesan board of directors, as assistant chancellor, consultor, director of religious instruction and vicar general among other responsibilities. In addition Crowley served as the editor of Our Sunday Visitor in Huntington, Indiana, moderator of the United States Bishops' Press Panel during the final session of the Second Vatican Council, and chairman of the U.S. Catholic Conference's Committee on Communication. On June 16, 1971 Pope Paul VI appointed him as the Titular Bishop of Maraguia and Auxiliary Bishop of Fort Wayne-South Bend. He was ordained a bishop by Archbishop George Biskup of Indianapolis on August 24, 1971. The principal co-consecrators were Bishops Leo Pursley of Fort Wayne-South Bend and Andrew Grutka of Gary. He continued to serve as auxiliary bishop and rector of St. Matthew's Cathedral until his resignation was accepted by Pope John Paul II on May 8, 1990. He was a Knights of Columbus member at Ave Maria Council 5521 in South Bend, Indiana. He died on February 4, 2003, at the age of 88.
