= John Michael D'Arcy =

American Catholic bishop (1932–2013)

His Excellency, The Most Reverend John Michael D'Arcy
- Bishop of Fort Wayne-South Bend
- Diocese: Fort Wayne-South Bend
- Installed: May 1, 1985
- Term ended: November 14, 2009
- Predecessor: William Edward McManus
- Successor: Kevin C. Rhoades
- Other posts: Auxiliary Bishop of Boston (1974-1985); Titular Bishop of Mediana (1974-1985)

Orders
- Ordination: February 2, 1957 by Richard James Cushing
- Consecration: December 30, 1974 by Humberto Medeiros

Personal details
- Born: August 18, 1932 Boston, Massachusetts, US
- Died: February 3, 2013 (aged 80) Fort Wayne, Indiana, US
- Denomination: Roman Catholic Church
- Education: St. John's Seminary; Pontifical University of St. Thomas Aquinas
- Motto: His steadfast love endures forever

Styles of John D'Arcy
- Reference style: The Most Reverend
- Spoken style: Your Excellency
- Religious style: Bishop
- Posthumous style: not applicable

John Michael D'Arcy (August 18, 1932 – February 3, 2013) was an American Catholic prelate of the who served as Bishop of Fort Wayne-South Bend from 1985 to 2009. He previously served as an auxiliary bishop for the Archdiocese of Boston from 1974 to 1985.

== Biography ==
=== Early life ===
John D'Arcy was born on August 18, 1932, in Boston, Massachusetts. His parents, Michael and Margaret (Moran) D'Arcy, were Irish immigrants. He had three sisters: Mrs. Mary Caprio, Sister Anne, and Mrs. Joan Sheridan. He entered St. John's Seminary in Boston in September 1949.

=== Priesthood ===
D'Arcy was ordained to the priesthood in Boston for the Archdiocese of Boston on February 2, 1957, by Cardinal Richard James Cushing. D'Arcy attended the Pontifical University of St. Thomas Aquinas in Rome from 1965 to 1968, earning a doctorate in spiritual theology. He served as spiritual director and professor of spiritual theology at St. John's Seminary from 1968 to 1985, and also as pastor of St. Mary Star of the Sea Parish in Beverly, Massachusetts.

=== Auxiliary Bishop of Boston ===
On December 30, 1974, D'Arcy was appointed as an auxiliary bishop of Boston and titular bishop of Mediana by Pope Paul VI. He received his episcopal consecration at the Cathedral of the Holy Cross in Boston on February 11, 1975, from Cardinal Humberto Medeiros, with Bishops Thomas Riley and Lawrence Riley serving as co-consecrators. He became episcopal vicar for the Lowell Region in 1981.

When serving as auxiliary bishop in Boston, D'Arcy "warned against the Catholic Church’s transfer of pedophile priest John Geoghan to a new parish, according to the church's own investigators. But Bishop D'Arcy's 1984 letter to Archbishop Bernard Francis Law about Geoghan’s history of abusing young boys did no good." Geoghan was left in his youth-groups job and "D'Arcy was transferred to Indiana".

=== Bishop of Fort Wayne-South Bend ===
D'Arcy was named bishop of Fort Wayne-South Bend by Pope John Paul II on February 26, 1985. Replacing Bishop William McManus, D'Arcy was installed on May 1, 1985.

In 2009, D'Arcy declared he would boycott the May graduation ceremony at the University of Notre Dame because President Barack Obama would be delivering the commencement speech and receiving an honorary degree. Noting Obama's "unwillingness to hold human life as sacred," he said that "a bishop must teach the Catholic faith 'in season and out of season,' and he teaches not only by his words–but by his actions" and asked Notre Dame if by choosing Obama "it has chosen prestige over truth."

=== Retirement ===
Pope Benedict XVI accepted D'Arcy's resignation as bishop of Fort Wayne-South Bend on November 14, 2009.

John D'Arcy died on February 3, 2013, in Fort Wayne, Indiana, from lung and brain cancer at age 80. Following his death, visitations were held at both St. Matthew's Cathedral in South Bend and the Cathedral of the Immaculate Conception in Fort Wayne. The mass of Christian burial for D'Arcy was held on February 8, 2013, at the Cathedral of the Immaculate Conception followed by the rite of committal, which was conducted privately with his family in the cathedral crypt.

== See also ==
- List of the Catholic bishops of the United States § Province of Indianapolis

== Sources ==
- Diocese of Fort Wayne-South Bend
- Michael J. D'Arcy obituary, Nashua Telegraph (Nashua, New Hampshire) December 2, 1977, page 2.

Catholic Church titles
| Preceded by William Edward McManus | Bishop of Fort Wayne-South Bend; 1985–2009 | Succeeded by Kevin C. Rhoades |
| Preceded by – | Auxiliary Bishop of Boston; 1975–1985 | Succeeded by – |
