= List of public art in Fort Wayne, Indiana =

This is a list of public art in Fort Wayne, Indiana.

This list applies only to works of public art accessible in an outdoor public space. For example, this does not include artwork visible inside a museum.

Most of the works mentioned are sculptures. When this is not the case (i.e. sound installation, for example) it is stated next to the title.

== Fort Wayne ==
Title	Artist	Year	Location/GPS Coordinates	Material	Dimensions	Owner	Image
3 Rivers Water Filtration Plant	Wilbur Bybee	1933	Three Rivers Water Filtration Plant	Indiana limestone	139 relief panels. (Larger panels: each approx. 2 ft. 11 in. × 4 ft. × 3 in.); (Smaller panels: each approx. 1 ft. 11 in. × 2 ft. 11 in. × 3 in.).	Three Rivers Water Filtration Plant	
Abraham Lincoln: The Hoosier Youth	Paul Manship	1932	Lincoln National Life Insurance Company 41°4′25.45″N 85°8′23.47″W	Bronze	Sculpture: approx. 12 ft. 6 in. × 4 ft. 7 in. × 4 ft. 7 in.	Lincoln National Corporation	
Allen County Courthouse Reliefs	Brentwood Tolan	1902	Allen County Courthouse	Limestone		Allen County Commissioners	
American Flyer	Robert R. Johnson	1991	Anthis Career Center 41°4′29.72″N 85°8′11.36″W	Aluminum	Sculpture: approx. 13 × 5 1/2 × 6 ft.	Fort Wayne Community Schools	
Angel	Unknown		Lindenwood Cemetery	Marble	Sculpture: approx. 66 × 26 × 25 in.	Lindenwood Cemetery	
Animal in Motion	Abbott Pattison	1960	Fort Wayne Museum of Art	Bronze	Sculpture: 48 × 80 × 40 in.	Fort Wayne Museum of Art	
Anthony Wayne	Brentwood Tolan	1902	Allen County Courthouse	Limestone		Allen County Commissioners	
Anthony Wayne Monument	George Etienne Ganiere	1918	Freimann Square	Bronze	Sculpture: approx. 20 × 13 × 5 ft.	City of Fort Wayne	
(Anthony Wayne on Horseback)			Anthony Wayne Building	Aluminum	Approx. 9 × 10 × 1 ft.		
Black Prow	George Sugarman	1978	Lincoln National Life Insurance Company	Metal	Sculpture: approx. 7 ft. 4 in. × 7 ft. 1 in. × 7 ft. 4 in.	Lincoln National Corporation	
Blessed Virgin	Unknown	1989	Our Lady of Good Hope Catholic Church	Painted Concrete	Sculpture: approx. 47 × 19 × 11 in.	Our Lady of Good Hope Catholic Church	
Blessed Virgin		ca. 1955	Precious Blood Catholic Church	Marble	Statue: approx. 7 1/2 ft. × 2 ft. × 18 in.	Precious Blood Catholic Church	
Blessed Virgin	Unknown		Queen of Angels Catholic Church	Limestone	Statue: approx. 10 ft. × 40 in. × 12 in.	Queen of Angels Catholic Church	
Blessed Virgin	Unknown	ca. 1943	Poor Sisters of Saint Clare41°4′6.4″N 85°6′13.28″W	Painted Concrete, Fieldstone, Mortar & Seashells	Statue: approx. 5 ft. × 27 in. × 17 in.; Grotto: 14 × 16 × 5 ft.	Poor Sisters of Saint Clare	
Christ	Unknown	1958	Old Concordia Cemetery	Marble	Sculpture: approx. 73 × 36 × 36 in.	Concordia Cemetery Gardens and Mausoleums	
Christ	Unknown	1961	Concordia Cemetery Gardens & Mausoleums	Marble	Sculpture: approx. 6 ft. × 3 ft. × 17 in.	Concordia Cemetery Gardens and Mausoleums	
Christ Holding a Chalice	Unknown	ca. 1950	Cathedral of the Immaculate Conception41°4′32.51″N 85°8′16.19″W	Limestone	Sculpture: approx. H. 17 1/2 ft. × Diam. 40 in.	Cathedral of the Immaculate Conception (Fort Wayne, Indiana)	
Christ in the Garden of Gethsemane	William Conrad Severson	1962	Concordia Cemetery Gardens and Mausoleums - Garden of Prayer	Granite	Sculpture: approx. 8 ft. × 14 in. × 2 ft. 3 in.	Concordia Cemetery Gardens and Mausoleums	
Christ in the Garden of Gethsemane	Unknown		Catholic Cemetery	Marble	Sculpture: approx. 51 × 48 × 16 in.	Catholic Cemetery	
Christ of Lewis Street	Vassano Clementi	1938	130 E. Lewis St	Marble	Sculpture: approx. 9 ft. 4 in. × 3 ft. × 2 1/2 ft.	Cathedral of the Immaculate Conception	
Center Altar	Daprato Statuary Company	1931	Catholic Cemetery	Bronze	Sculpture: approx. 14 ft. × 82 in. × 22 in.	Roman Catholic Diocese of Fort Wayne-South Bend	
Cinderella	Salin	1987	Foellinger-Freimann Botanical Conservatory	Cast Iron & Paint	Sculpture: approx. 3 1/2 × 2 × 3 1/2 ft.	City of Fort Wayne	
Civil War Monument	Hamilton	1893	Lawton Park 41°5′21.54″N 85°8′5.78″W	Bronze	Sculpture: approx. 10 × 4 × 4 ft.	City of Fort Wayne	
Crack the Whip	John Seward Johnson II	1984	Lincoln National Life Insurance Company41°4′22.63″N 85°8′23.01″W	Bronze	Sculpture: approx. 3 ft. 9 in. × 17 ft. 6 in. × 12 ft.	Lincoln National Corporation	
Crossings	David Evans Black	1984	Fort Wayne Museum of Art 41°4′52.05″N 85°8′9.8″W	Steel	18 × 30 × 40 ft. (3 tons)	Fort Wayne Museum of Art	
Dancing Family	Milton Hebald	1970	Fort Wayne Children's Zoo	Bronze	Sculpture: approx. 60 × 50 × 58 in.	Fort Wayne Children's Zoo	
David N. Foster	Frederick Hibbard	1922	Swinney Park	Bronze	Sculpture: approx. 9 ft. 6 in. × 42 in. × 31 1/4 in.	City of Fort Wayne	
Eagles	Unknown	ca. 1903	203 East Douglas Avenue	Limestone	Each eagle: approx. 4 × 4 × 4 ft.	Fort Wayne Community Schools	
Four Angels and Two Crosses	Unknown	ca. 1949–1950	MacDougal Chapel, Cathedral of the Immaculate Conception	Bronze	Approx. 5 ft. 4 in. × 17 in. × 3 in.	Cathedral of the Immaculate Conception (Fort Wayne, Indiana)	
Freedom	Robert R. Johnson	1986	Foellinger-Freimann Botanical Conservatory	Metal	Sculpture: approx. 132 × 120 × 18 in.	City of Fort Wayne	
(Freeform Abstract)	Hector Garcia		Sherman Park	Concrete & Styrofoam	Sculpture: approx. 5 ft. 3 in. × 5 ft. × 10 ft. 10 in.	City of Fort Wayne	
Galapagos Tortoise	Tom Tischler	1985	Fort Wayne Children's Zoo	Bronze	Approx. 32 × 57 × 24 in.	Fort Wayne Children's Zoo	
General Henry W. Lawton Monument	Frederick Hibbard	ca. 1920	Lakeside Park	Bronze	Sculpture: approx. 10 1/2 × 4 × 4 ft.	Lakeside Park	
George Washington	Brentwood Tolan	1902	Allen County Courthouse	Limestone		Allen County Commissioners	
Helitec I	Timothy Doyle	1980	Fort Wayne Museum of Art	Indiana Limestone & Stainless Steel	Sculpture: approx. 6 ft. 2 in. × 55 in. × 2 ft.	Fort Wayne Museum of Art	
Indiana Landscape	Briant & 18 artists	1984	Neff Hall, Indiana University – Purdue University Fort Wayne campus	Ceramic	Approx. 12 ft. 6 in. × 16 ft. 6 in. × 3 ft. 9 in.	Indiana University – Purdue University Fort Wayne	
Jesuit Priest	Hector Garcia	1976		Bronze	Figure: approx. 7 1/2 ft. × 2 ft. × 34 in.	City of Fort Wayne	
Jesus and the Little Children	Marshall Fredericks	1962	St. John's Lutheran Church	Aluminum	Approx. 6 ft. × 8 ft. × 12 in.	St. John's Lutheran Church	
John Allen	Brentwood Tolan	1902	Allen County Courthouse	Limestone		Allen County Commissioners	
John Nuckols	Hector Garcia	1985	Hanna Park	Bronze or Brass	Bust: approx. 28 × 26 × 13 in.	City of Fort Wayne	
Koala and Platypus	Connie Phillips	1987	Fort Wayne Children's Zoo	Bronze	2 sculptures. Koala: approx. 29 × 18 × 10 in.; Base: approx. H. 55 in. × Diam. 58 in.; Platypus: approx. 12 × 25 × 8 in.; Base: approx. H. 14 in. × Diam. 45 in.	Fort Wayne Children's Zoo	
Lafayette	Brentwood Tolan	1902	Allen County Courthouse	Limestone		Allen County Commissioners	
Liberty	Brentwood Tolan	1902	Allen County Courthouse Dome 41°4′47.38″N 85°8′21.83″W	Copper	Approx. H. 13 ft. 8 in.	Allen County Commissioners	
Lions Park Monument	Unknown	1953	Lions Park	Limestone	Sculpture: approx. 31 × 27 × 61 in.	City of Fort Wayne	
Little Turtle	Hector Garcia	1976		Bronze	Sculpture: approx. 9 ft. 6 in. × 37 in. × 16 in.	Fort Wayne Historical Society	
LVII	Bill Barrett	1987	Lincoln National Life Insurance Company	Aluminum	Sculpture: approx. 10 ft. 3 in. × 6 ft. 7 in. × 4 ft. 10 in.	Lincoln National Corporation	
Lifestarts	Eric Ernstberger	1991	Lutheran Hospital of Indiana 41°2′19.63″N 85°14′55.27″W	Stainless steel	Approx. 16 ft. 4 in. × 33 1/2 ft. × 4 ft.	Lutheran Hospital of Indiana	
Moses and St. Paul	Unknown	1925	Trinity English Evangelical Lutheran Church 41°4′37.5″N 85°8′41.2″W	Limestone	Approx. 6 × 2 × 2 ft.	Trinity English Evangelical Lutheran Church	
Mother Seton	Allison Adams	1987	Catholic Cemetery	Indiana limestone	Approx. 15 ft. × 6 ft. × 10 in.	Roman Catholic Diocese of Fort Wayne-South Bend	
Mystery of Faith	Bert Gast	1973	Catholic Cemetery, 3500 Lake Avenue	Barre granite	Sculpture: approx. H. 17 ft. 9 in. × Diam. 4 ft. 8 in.	Catholic Cemetery Association	
Old Aqueduct Club Monument	M.S. Mahurin	1923	Orff Park 41°4′41.89″N 85°9′12.74″W	Limestone	Sculpture: approx. 6 ft. × 46 1/2 in. × 24 in.	City of Fort Wayne	
Olen J. Pond Memorial	Frederick Hibbard	1930	Memorial Park	Limestone	Sculpture: approx. 6 ft. × 28 in. × 16 in.	City of Fort Wayne	
Our Lady	Unknown	1938	Cathedral of the Immaculate Conception	Limestone	Sculpture: approx. 9 ft. 9 in. × 2 ft. 4 in. × 1 ft. 8 in.	Cathedral of the Immaculate Conception (Fort Wayne, Indiana)	
Perry A. Randall	Frederick Hibbard	1916	Swinney Park 41°4′24.65″N 85°9′33.81″W	Bronze	Sculpture: approx. 32 × 32 1/2 × 17 3/4 in.	City of Fort Wayne	
Pietà	Unknown	Before 1941	Catholic Cemetery	Concrete	Sculpture: approx. 45 × 47 × 26 in.	Diocese of Fort Wayne-South Bend	
Polyminia	Harold Reed Langland	1984	Calhoun Street Transit/Ped Mall	Metal	Approx. H. 8 ft. × Diam. 2 ft.	Fort Wayne Citilink	
Praying Hands	Unknown	1980s	Covington Memorial Gardens	Marble	Sculpture: approx. 74 × 31 × 31 in.	Memory Gardens Management Corporation	
Praying Hands	Pompeiian Studios	1972	Lindenwood Cemetery	Marble	Sculpture: approx. 54 × 34 1/2 × 34 1/2 in.	Lindenwood Cemetery	
Quake	Peter Forakis	1982	Fort Wayne Museum of Art 41°4′52.35″N 85°8′7.07″W	Steel	Sculpture: approx. 10 1/2 ft. × 12 ft. × 38 in.	Fort Wayne Museum of Art	
St. Charles Borromeo	Hector Garcia	1980	St. Charles Borromeo Catholic Church		Figure: approx. 77 × 21 × 17 in.	St. Charles Borromeo Catholic Church	
St. Christopher	Unknown	After 1950	Cathedral of the Immaculate Conception	Concrete	Sculpture: approx. 64 × 20 × 20 in.	Cathedral of the Immaculate Conception (Fort Wayne, Indiana)	
Saint Elizabeth Ann Seton With Children	Margaret Beaudette	1993	St. Elizabeth Ann Seton Parish	Fiberglass	Sculpture: approx. H. 5 1/2 ft. × Diam. 55 in.	Roman Catholic Diocese of Fort Wayne-South Bend	
St. Frances Xavier Cabrini	Hector Garcia	ca. 1976	Catholic Cemetery	Limestone	Sculpture: approx. 15 ft. 11 in. × 6 ft. × 11 in.	Roman Catholic Diocese of Fort Wayne-South Bend	
St. John Neumann	Timothy Doyle		Catholic Cemetery	Limestone	Relief: approx. 15 ft. 11 in. × 6 in. × 11 in.	Roman Catholic Diocese of Fort Wayne-South Bend	
Saint Joseph the Worker	Lemuel Joyner	1961	St. Joseph Catholic Church	Bronze	Approx. 11 × 3 × 1 ft.	St. Joseph Catholic Church	
Saint Joseph the Worker	Unknown	1965	St. Joseph Hospital	Marble	Approx. 21 ft. × 5 ft. × 2 ft. 6 in.	St. Joseph Hospital	
St. Jude	Unknown	ca. 1964	St. Jude Catholic Church	Concrete	Statue: approx. 5 ft. 3 in. × 24 in. × 14 in.	St. Jude Catholic Church	
St. Therese "The Little Flower"	Unknown	ca. 1962	St. Therese Catholic Church	Marble	Statue: approx. 5 ft. × 21 in. × 14 in.	St. Therese Catholic Church	
St. Vincent de Paul	Unknown	ca. 1967	St. Vincent's Catholic Church	Marble	Statue: approx. 70 × 24 × 16 1/2 in.	St. Vincent's Catholic Church	
St. Vincent de Paul		1969	Catholic Cemetery	Granite	Sculpture: approx. 6 ft. 2 in. × 21 in. × 18 in.	Diocese of Fort Wayne-South Bend	
Blessed Virgin		1992	Precious Blood Catholic Church	Marble	Statue: approx 6 ft. × 27 in. × 26 in., Each decorative piece: approx. D. 8 in. × Diam. 25 in.	Precious Blood Catholic Church	
Station	Stuart Fink	1986	Fort Wayne Museum of Art	Concrete	Sculpture: 99 3/4 × 23 × 24 in.	Fort Wayne Museum of Art	
Statue of Blessed Virgin	Unknown	1988	Bishop Dwenger High School	Marble	Sculpture: approx. 5 ft. × 26 in. × 12 in.	Diocese of Fort Wayne-South Bend	
The Healing Christ	Herman Scherer	1916	Lutheran Center for Health Services	Granite	Sculpture: approx. 6 ft. 4 in. × 4 ft. 10 in. × 2 ft. 4 in.	Lutheran Center for Health Services	
The Immaculate Conception	Unknown		Cathedral of the Immaculate Conception	Marble	Approx. 9 × 4 × 4 ft.	Cathedral of the Immaculate Conception (Fort Wayne, Indiana)	
The Luther Statue	Frederick Soetebier	1957	Concordia Theological Seminary	Bronze	Sculpture: approx. 12 1/2 ft. × 80n in. × 32 in.	Concordia Theological Seminary	
The Muse	Sufi Ahmad	1986	Foellinger-Freimann Botanical Conservatory	Bronze	Sculpture: approx. 55 × 76 × 77 in.	City of Fort Wayne	
The Spirit of Flight	James Novelli	1928	Memorial Park	Bronze	Sculpture: approx. 55 × 76 × 77 in.	City of Fort Wayne	
Spirit of the American Doughboy	E. M. Viquesney	1920	Memorial Park	Bronze	Sculpture: approx. 7 ft. × 31 in. × 26 in.	City of Fort Wayne	
The Spirit of the American Navy	E. M. Viquesney	1928	Memorial Park	Bronze	Sculpture: approx. 7 ft. × 31 in. × 26 in.	City of Fort Wayne	
Two Open Rectangles Eccentric Variation IV	George Rickey	1978	Lincoln National Corporation	Stainless steel & Aluminum	Sculpture: approx. 7 ft. 11 in. × 11 ft. × 2 ft.	Lincoln National Corporation	
Untitled	Richard Stankiewcz	1978	Lincoln National Corporation	Steel	Sculpture: approx. 11 ft. 10 in. × 10 ft. × 5 ft.	Lincoln National Corporation	
Veterans Memorial	Tavarelli Marble Works	1975	Covington Memorial Gardens	Marble	6 figures. Tallest figure: approx. 83 × 22 × 14 in.; Shortest figure: approx. 75 × 22 × 13 in.	Covington Memorial Gardens	
Wind Dancer	Yvonne Zalkowski Tofthagen	1981	Calhoun Street Transit/Pedestrian Mall	Metal	Approx. 8 ft. × 5 ft. 7 in. × 5 ft. 3 in., Diam. 30 in.	Fort Wayne Citilink	
