= Robert M. Feustel House =

Historic house in Indiana, United States

- U.S. National Register of Historic Places
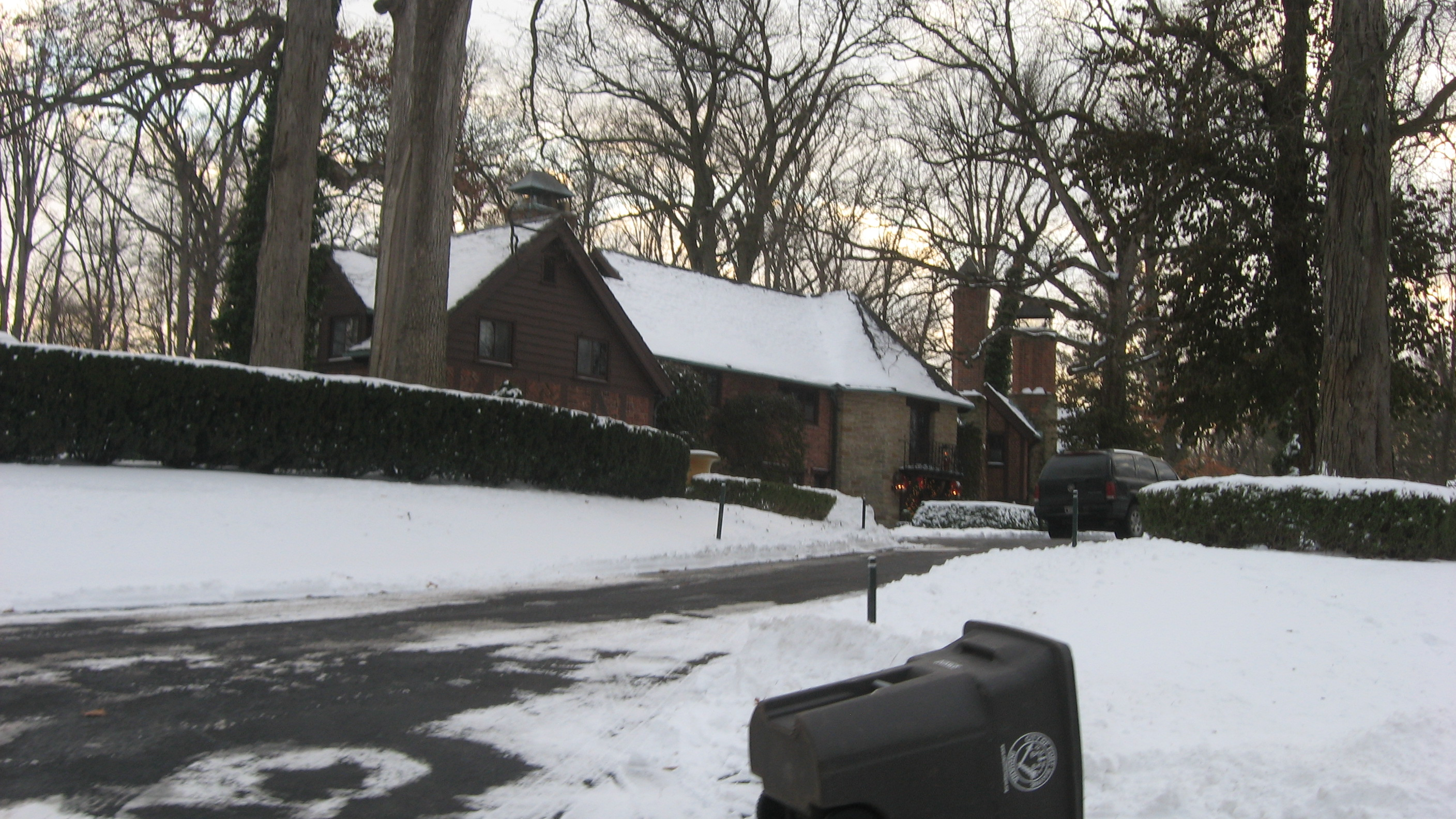
- Robert M. Feustel House, January 2014

- Location within Indiana Location within the United States
- Location: 4101 W. Taylor St., Fort Wayne, Indiana
- Coordinates: 41°3′52″N 85°11′38″W
- Area: 1.3 acres (0.53 ha)
- Built: 1927
- Architect: Meade & Hamilton
- Architectural style: Tudor Revival
- NRHP reference No.: 80000049
- Added to NRHP: November 7, 1980

The Robert M. Feustel House is a historic home in Fort Wayne, Indiana. It was built in 1927, and consists of a series of irregularly intersecting two-story, Tudor Revival style hip-roofed masses. It features polygonal chimney stacks, half-timbering with herringbone brick infill, and diagonal projections at the juncture of the wings.

The home is named for its original owner, Robert M. Feustel. Feustel, a graduate of Purdue University, worked as a civil engineer and businessman. Across his life, he served as President of Indiana Service Corporation; President of Midland United Company; President of the Indiana Railroad Company; General Manager of the Fort Wayne and Lima Railroad Company; President of the State Line Generating Company of Chicago; Chairman of the West Ohio Gas Company; President of the Public Service Company of Indiana; and President of the Northern Indiana Public Service Company. He also served as Director of the Seventh District of the Federal Reserve Bank of Chicago. Additionally, he was involved in the field of education, serving as a Trustee of Purdue University and as President of the Fort Wayne School of Art (which later became part of the Indiana University system).

Bishop Leo A. Pursley of the Diocese of Fort Wayne-South Bend resided in the Robert M. Feustel House for twenty years.

It was listed on the National Register of Historic Places in 1980.
