= John Sheets =

John Sheets may refer to:

- John Richard Sheets, American Roman Catholic bishop
- John M. Sheets, politician from the U.S. state of Ohio
