= John F. Noll =

American prelate

His Excellency, the Most Reverend John Francis Noll
- Archbishop-Bishop of Fort Wayne
- Church: Roman Catholicism
- Province: Indianapolis
- Diocese: Fort Wayne
- See: Fort Wayne
- In office: June 30, 1925 to July 31, 1956
- Predecessor: Herman Joseph Alerding
- Successor: Leo Aloysius Pursley

Orders
- Ordination: June 4, 1898 by Joseph Rademacher
- Consecration: June 30, 1925 by George Mundelein

Personal details
- Born: January 25, 1875 Fort Wayne, Indiana
- Died: July 31, 1956 (aged 81) Huntington, Indiana, US
- Education: St. Lawrence Seminary
- Motto: Mentes tuorum visita (Visit the minds of your people)

Styles of John Francis Noll
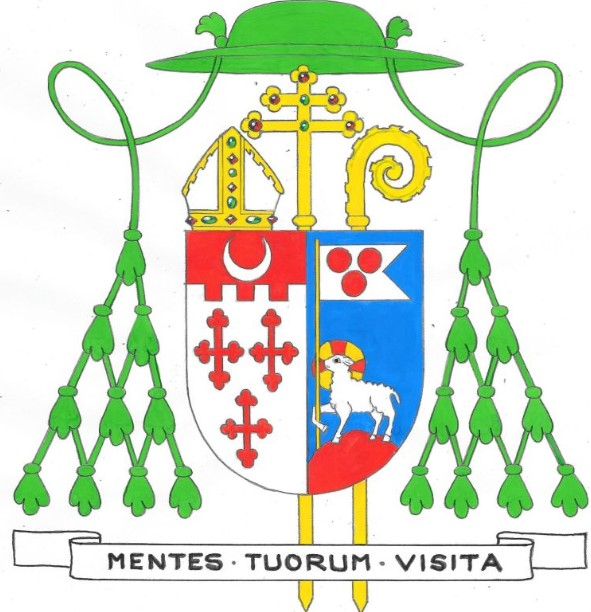
- Reference style: His Excellency; The Most Reverend
- Spoken style: Your Excellency
- Religious style: Bishop

John Francis Noll (January 25, 1875 – July 31, 1956) was an American prelate of the Catholic Church. He served as bishop of Fort Wayne in Indiana from 1925 until his death in 1956. He received the personal title of archbishop in 1953.

Noll was active in national church organizations. In 1912, he founded the weekly newspaper Our Sunday Visitor. Noll was called one of the most influential Catholics of his day. His significant role in the completion of the Shrine earned him the moniker “Apostle of the Shrine.”

== Biography ==
=== Early life ===
John Noll was born on January 25, 1875, in Fort Wayne, Indiana, one of nineteen children. He attended St. Lawrence Seminary in Mt. Calvary, Wisconsin, from 1888 to 1893.

=== Priesthood ===
Noll was ordained a priest at the Cathedral of the Immaculate Conception in Fort Wayne, Indiana, on June 4, 1898, for the Diocese of Fort Wayne by Bishop Joseph Rademacher. After his ordination, Noll was assigned to a pastoral position at St. Patrick Parish in Ligonier, Indiana.

As a young priest, Noll frequently challenged anti-Catholic propaganda in the area. He sometimes confronted public speakers who claimed to be former priests. These men would regale crowds with stories about alleged evil practices in Catholic churches. Noll would ask the imposters to name their religious order or request they recite a specific Catholic prayer. Sometimes he would ask them questions in Latin, a language understood by all priests. These tactics frequently exposed the speakers as frauds. Noll wrote Father Smith Instructs Jackson in 1900.

In 1910, Noll was named pastor of St. Mary's Catholic Parish in Huntington, Indiana. Noll bought a printing press and in 1912 founded the weekly newspaper Our Sunday Visitor (OSV) It was widely distributed in many parishes as a supplement or in coordination with the local paper. For a time, it became a popular Catholic newsweekly nationwide. Noll donated all the OSV profits to religious, educational and charitable causes. He embraced the communication tools of his day — print, radio and later television. Noll served on the boards of the Catholic Press Association and the Catholic Church Extension Society in Chicago. The Vatican elevated Noll to the rank of monsignor in 1921.

=== Bishop of Fort Wayne ===
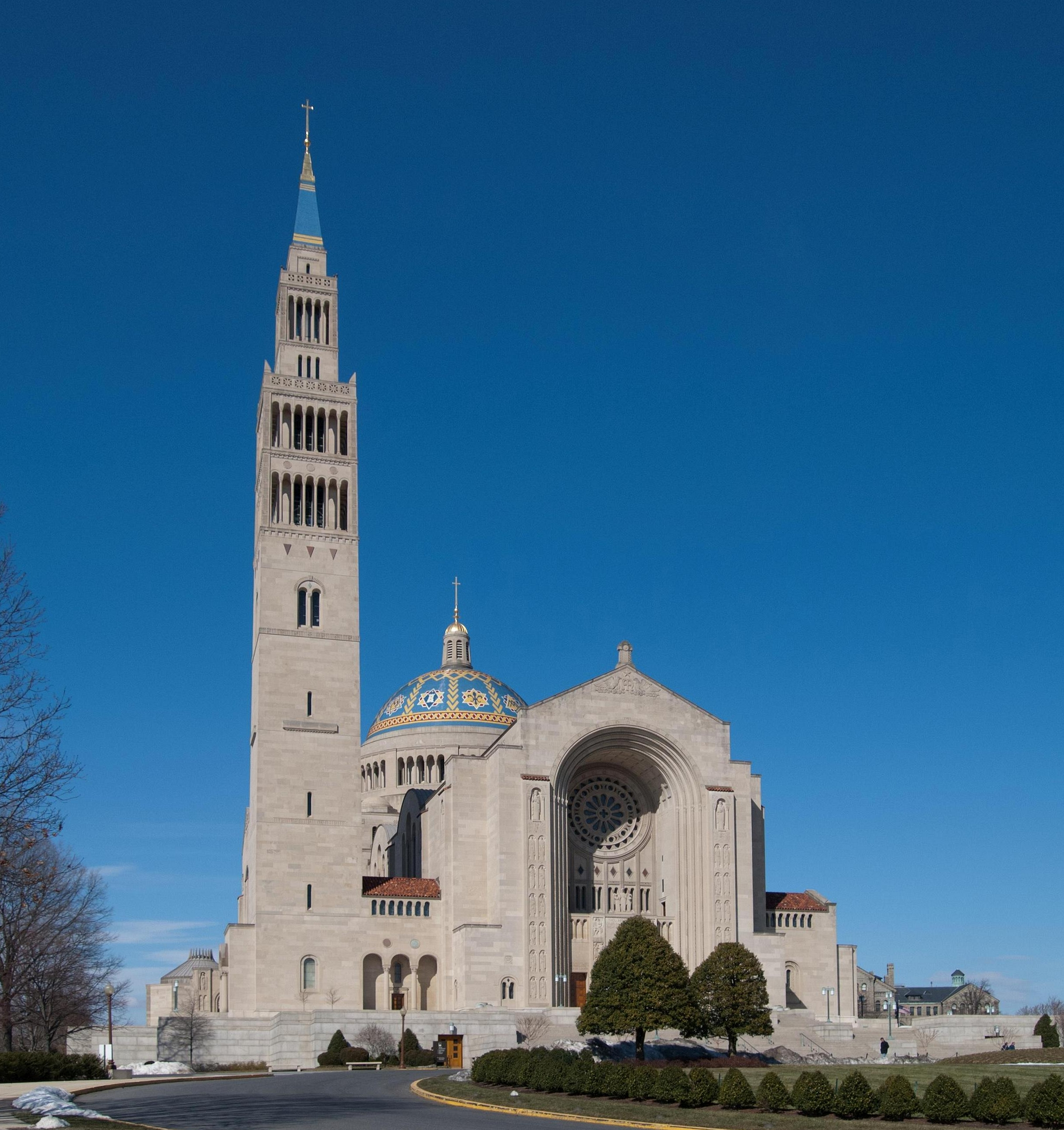
Basilica of the National Shrine of the Immaculate Conception, Washington D.C. (2013)

Noll was appointed fifth bishop of Fort Wayne by Pope Pius XI on May 12, 1925. Noll was consecrated at the Cathedral of the Immaculate Conception on July 30, 1925, by Archbishop George Mundelein.

As bishop, Noll built a preparatory seminary, several high schools, and an orphanage. During the Great Depression of the 1930s, he reorganized the system of Catholic charities. He was active as an organizer the national level, and chaired the Department of Lay Organizations of the National Catholic Welfare Conference. Noll was instrumental for renewing support in 1953 for the completion of the National Shrine of the Immaculate Conception in Washington, D.C.

Pope Pius XII elevated Noll to archbishop ad personam on September 2, 1953, meaning that the title was personal to Noll and not passed on to his successors.

=== Political activism ===
Noll was strongly associated with conservative elements of the Catholic Church, allied with the anti-communist movement in the United States and elsewhere. He condemned many labor unions, much to the chagrin of several fellow bishop. Noll also collaborated with the anti-Semitic radio priest, Reverend Charles Coughlin.

=== Death and legacy ===
John Noll died in Huntington on July 31, 1956, and is buried in the Victory Noll Cemetery there.

- Sister Maria Stanisia, an artist in Chicago, painted Portrait of Bishop John F. Noll.
- The Bishop Noll Institute, a Catholic high school in Hammond, Indiana, is named after Noll.
- A stained glass portrait of Noll is mounted in the museum of the Diocese of Fort Wayne.

Catholic Church titles
| Preceded by Herman Joseph Alerding | Bishop of Fort Wayne; 1925—1956 | Succeeded by Leo Aloysius Pursley |
