= St. Mary's Catholic Church (Huntington, Indiana) =

Catholic church in Indiana, US

- Location in Indiana
- 40°53′09″N 85°29′53″W
- Location: Huntington, Indiana
- Country: United States
- Denomination: Catholic Church
- Sui iuris church: Latin Church
- Website: www.stmaryhuntington.org

Architecture
- Completed: October 11, 1896

Administration
- Diocese: Diocese of Fort Wayne-South Bend

St. Mary's Catholic Church is a Catholic parish church in the city of Huntington, Indiana, and was completed on October 11, 1896. There are about 1500 parish members that attend St. Mary's Church. The Church stands 130 feet (40 m) tall from the main tower, while the other tower is 94 feet (29 m) tall. The Church is part of the Catholic Diocese of Fort Wayne-South Bend.

== History ==
John Roche, a land owner in Huntington, owning around 10,000 acres (40 km^{2}), had always wanted an English-speaking church, specifically an Irish one. The only church was St. Peter and Paul's Catholic Church, where German was spoken. He died before he could accomplish his dream but his sister Bridget took the money that she had received for selling her brother's 10,000-acre (40 km^{2}) estate to build St. Mary's Catholic Church. The project would cost 75,000 dollars. The cornerstone of the church was laid May 3, 1896, John Roche's 79th birthday, and the dedication was in October 1897. When completed the Church had a good review with stained glass windows from the Royal Bavarian Art Institute of Munich; with eight large columns of imported Italian granite to support the arches in the nave, the large statues and Stations of the Cross from France; the pews are made of oak, and polished red brick on the exterior. Through the years the church has gone through much and in the 1950s it had an interior remodeling. It was in the late 1940s that the church removed its three large and ornate altars as well as the elaborately carved wooden frames fitted around the current Stations of the Cross for replacements with a more modern appearance.

== Today ==
Father Thomas Zehr is the current priest at St. Mary's. Father Stephen Colchin was his predecessor. St. Mary's has partnered up with St. Peter and Paul's to help educate young children. St. Mary has a Middle School on its grounds while St. Peter and Paul's has the elementary school. The schools are still up and running while they flourish to teach young children. There was a high school but it closed due to financial problems following the 1984–85 academic year; the high school won the 1935 and 1941 Catholic High School State Basketball Tournament.
