= Leo Aloysius Pursley =

American clergyman

His Excellency, The Most Reverend Leo Aloysius Pursley
- Bishop of Fort Wayne-South Bend
- Church: Roman Catholic
- Diocese: Fort Wayne-South Bend
- In office: February 26, 1957 to August 24, 1976
- Predecessor: John F. Noll
- Successor: William Edward McManus
- Other posts: Auxiliary Bishop of Fort Wayne (1950-1957); Titular Bishop of Hadrianopolis in Pisidia (1950-1957)

Orders
- Ordination: June 11, 1927 by Bishop John F. Noll
- Consecration: September 19, 1951 by Amleto Giovanni Cicognani, John F. Noll, Joseph M. Marling, co-consecrators

Personal details
- Born: March 12, 1902 Hartford City, Indiana, US
- Died: November 15, 1998 (aged 96) Fort Wayne, Indiana, US
- Denomination: Roman Catholic
- Parents: Alexander Nelson and Mary Jeanette (née Sloan) Pursley
- Education: Mount St. Mary's Seminary of the West
- Motto: In manibus dei (In the hands of God)

Leo Aloysius Pursley (March 12, 1902 – November 15, 1998) was an American clergyman of the Roman Catholic Church. He served as bishop of the Diocese of Fort Wayne-South Bend in Indiana from 1956 to 1976.

== Biography ==
=== Early life ===
Leo Pursley was born on March 12, 1902, in Hartford City, Indiana, to Alexander Nelson and Mary Jeanette (née Sloan) Pursley. His father was a local Democratic politician and delegate to the 1940 Democratic National Convention. Leo Pursley studied at Mount St. Mary's Seminary of the West in Cincinnati,

=== Priesthood ===
Pursley was ordained to the priesthood for the Diocese of Fort Wayne on June 11, 1927, by Bishop John Noll in Fort Wayne, Indiana. After his ordination, Pursley served in the following assignments in Indiana parishes:

- Curate at St. Mary in Lafayette
- Curate at St. Lawrence in Muncie
- Curate at St. Patrick in Fort Wayne
- Pastor of Sacred Heart in Warsaw
- Pastor of St. John the Baptist in Fort Wayne

=== Auxiliary Bishop of Fort Wayne ===
On July 22, 1950, Pursley was appointed as an auxiliary bishop of Fort Wayne and titular bishop of Hadrianopolis in Pisidia by Pope Pius XII. He received his episcopal consecration at the Cathedral of the Immaculate Conception in Fort Wayne on September 19, 1950, from Archbishop Amleto Cicognani, with Bishops Noll and Joseph M. Marling serving as co-consecrators.

=== Bishop of Fort Wayne-South Bend ===
Following the death of Bishop Noll, Pursley was named bishop of what was now the Diocese of Fort Wayne-South Bend on December 29, 1956. His installation took place at the Cathedral of the Immaculate Conception on February 26, 1957. Pursley attended all four sessions of the Second Vatican Council in Rome from 1962 to 1965.

=== Personal life, retirement, and legacy ===
Pursley resided in Fort Wayne's historic Robert M. Feustel Home for twenty years.

On August 24, 1976, Pope Paul VI accepted Pursley's resignation as bishop of Fort Wayne-South Bend. Leo Pursley died in Fort Wayne on November 15, 1998, at age 96.

In 2008, it was revealed in court papers that Pursley in 1972 wrote to Bishop John Marshall of the Diocese of Burlington about Reverend Edward Paquette, a priest of the Diocese of Fort Wayne-South Bend. Paquette wanted to transfer to Vermont. Pursley warned Marshall that Paquette had been accused of molesting boys and should, if accepted in Vermont, be kept away from children. Marshall allowed Paquette to transfer, but ignored Pursley's advice. In 2008, the Diocese of Burlington paid out a $8.7 million settlement to a Vermont sexual abuse victim of Paquette.

== See also ==
Catholic Church titles
Preceded by John F. Noll	Bishop of Fort Wayne-South Bend; 1956—1976	Succeeded by William Edward McManus
