= William Edward McManus =

American bishop

His Excellency, The Most Reverend William Edward McManus
- Bishop of Fort Wayne-South Bend
- Church: Roman Catholic Church
- See: Diocese of Fort Wayne-South Bend
- Predecessor: Leo Aloysius Pursley
- Successor: John Michael D'Arcy
- Other posts: Titular Bishop of Mesarfelta; Auxiliary Bishop of Chicago; 1967 to 1976

Orders
- Ordination: April 15, 1939, by George William Mundelein
- Consecration: August 24, 1967 by John Patrick Cody

Personal details
- Born: January 27, 1914 Chicago, Illinois, US
- Died: March 3, 1997 (aged 83) Des Plaines, Illinois, US
- Motto: Sursum corda (Lift up your hearts)

William Edward McManus (January 27, 1914 – March 3, 1997) was a 20th-century bishop of the Catholic Church in the United States. He served as an auxiliary bishop of the Archdiocese of Chicago in Illinois from 1967 to 1976 and bishop of the Diocese of Fort Wayne-South Bend in Indiana from 1976 to 1985.

== Biography ==
William McManus was born on January 27, 1914, in Chicago, Illinois. He was ordained a priest on April 15, 1939, for the Archdiocese of Chicago by Cardinal George Mundelein.

=== Auxiliary Bishop of Chicago ===
On June 11, 1967, McManus was named titular bishop of Mesarfelta and auxiliary bishop of the Archdiocese of Chicago by Pope Paul VI. He was consecrated at Holy Name Cathedral in Chicago on August 24, 1967, by Cardinal John Cody. Bishops Cletus F. O'Donnell and Aloysius John Wycislo were the principal co-consecrators.

=== Bishop of Fort Wayne-South Bend ===
On August 24, 1976, Paul VI named McManus as the seventh bishop of Fort Wayne-South Bend.He was installed in Fort Wayne, Indiana, on October 29, 1976.

Pope John Paul II accepted McManus' resignation as bishop of Fort Wayne-South Bend on February 18, 1985. He died on March 3, 1997, at age 83 in Des Plaines, Illinois.

== See also ==
Catholic Church titles
Preceded by Leo Aloysius Pursley	Bishop of Fort Wayne-South Bend; 1976–1985	Succeeded by John Michael D'Arcy
