= Our Sunday Visitor =

Catholic publishing company

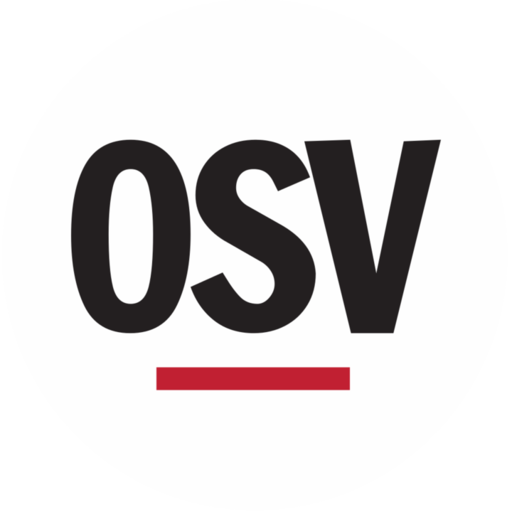
- Company logo
- Founded: 1912
- Founder: John F. Noll
- Country of origin: United States
- Headquarters location: Huntington, Indiana
- Key people: Kyle Hamilton, Scott P. Richert, Gretchen R. Crowe, Fr. Patrick Mary Briscoe, O.P.
- Publication types: Newspapers, magazines, books, pamphlets, offertory envelopes
- Official website: osv.com

Our Sunday Visitor (OSV) is a Catholic publishing company in Huntington, Indiana, which prints the American national weekly newspaper of that name, as well as numerous Catholic periodicals, religious books, pamphlets, catechetical materials, inserts for parish bulletins and offertory envelopes, and offers an "Online Giving" system and "Faith in Action" websites for parishes. Founded in 1912 by Fr John F. Noll, the newspaper Our Sunday Visitor was the most popular Catholic newsweekly of the twentieth century.

== History ==
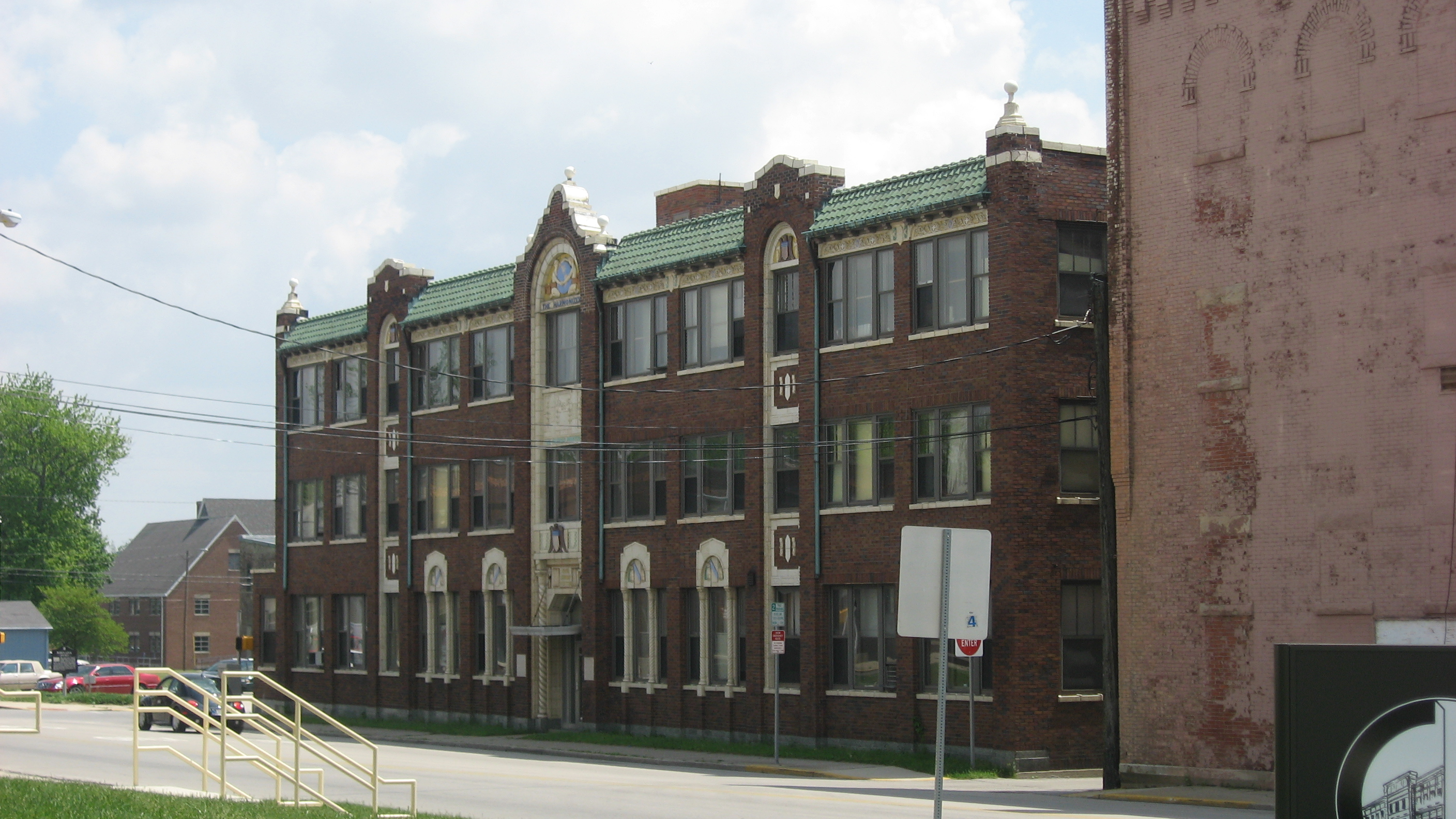
Our Sunday Visitor's former offices in Huntington

John Francis Noll, later Bishop of Fort Wayne in Indiana, was a small town priest who, having grown weary of anti-Catholic literature, and especially a widely circulated anti-Catholic paper called The Menace, decided to print a parish bulletin. The first issue of Our Sunday Visitor, numbering 35,000 copies, was dated May 5, 1912. A year later, the circulation of the paper had reached 160,000 copies, far beyond Noll's parish. Shortly after World War I, the circulation had grown to 500,000 copies.

The initial focus of Our Sunday Visitor was to combat anti-Catholicism, help Catholics preserve their identity, teach Catholics about their faith, and combat social injustice. A column Noll started in 1912, called "Father Smith Instructs Jackson", was later collected into a popular book, which sold millions of copies.

On March 30, 1913, the paper offered a $10,000 reward for anyone who could prove the anti-Catholic charges laid against the Church. No one ever claimed the reward.

In the 1930s, Our Sunday Visitor focused on how Catholics could preserve their faith in a secular society. During the 1940s, Noll's newspaper took positions against birth control, divorce, and indecent literature and movies.

During the Cold War, the paper expressed opposition to communism, discouraging Catholics from joining communist groups. The fortieth anniversary issue of Our Sunday Visitor, published on May 4, 1952, carried a banner headline that read, "They Do Not Want God in Our Schools: Secular Trend is Certain to Bring Disaster."

In 1953, Noll was named archbishop ad personam by Pope Pius XII. Noll suffered a stroke in 1954 and was no longer able to edit Our Sunday Visitor. He died on July 31, 1956.

After Noll's death, the paper continued to be produced, and in 1961 its circulation had surpassed one million. Today, Our Sunday Visitor has a full publishing wing which publishes books, religious educational materials, and other media. The company expanded by purchasing Harcourt Religion in 2009. As of 2019 the weekly newspaper is known as Our Sunday Visitor, and the editorial director for periodicals is Gretchen R. Crowe; earlier it was known as OSV Newsweekly. Fr. Patrick Mary Briscoe, O.P., was announced as Crowe's successor as editor of Our Sunday Visitor, on August 24, 2022.

In July 2012, Our Sunday Visitor was selected by the Vatican as the exclusive distributor of the North American English edition of the official Vatican newspaper, L'Osservatore Romano.

In July 2022, the company announced plans to acquire the operations of Catholic News Service, which was set to close its US office at the end of the year. Crowe will serve as the editor of the new agency, OSV News.

In July 2024, the company announced its weekly newspaper will transition to a monthly lifestyle magazine format.

== OSV News ==
OSV News
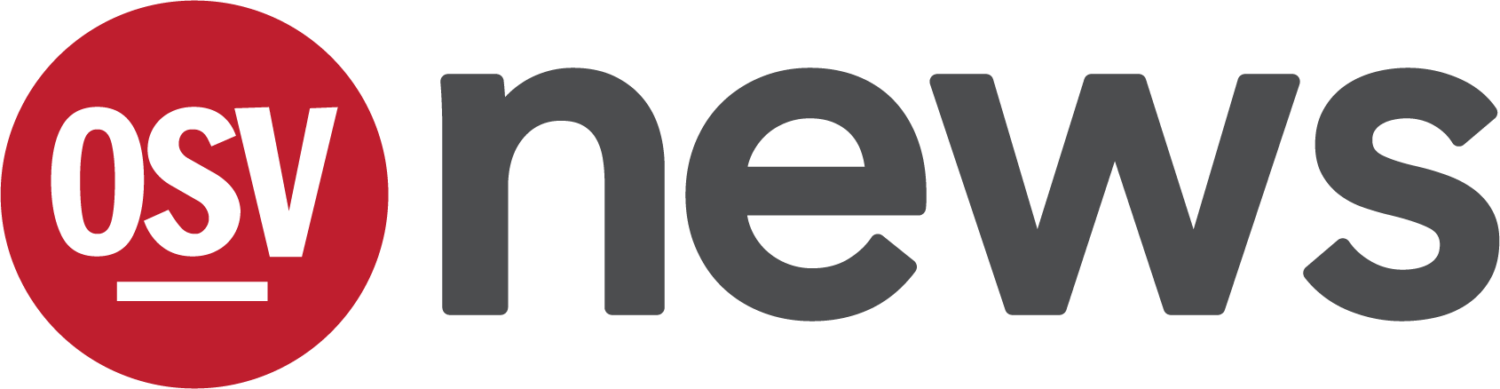
- Format: Online
- Owner: Our Sunday visitor
- Editor-in-chief: Gretchen Crowe
- Founded: 1 January 2023
- Language: English, Spanish
- Website: catholicnews.com and osvnews.com

Our Sunday Visitor announced in July 2022 that since the close of the US services of Catholic News Service (CNS) was planned, Our Sunday Visitor would be launching a new news agency on 1 January 2023: OSV News. Our Sunday Visitor also stated it would acquire the digital archives of CNS and allow for its consultations on OSV News by subscribers. They also stated the new agency's website would be hosted on CNS's former URL address.

In August 2022, Gretchen Crowe was named editor-in-chief of the future OSV News.

In September 2022, Our Sunday Visitor stated it would reemploy three veteran CNS journalists for the future launch of OSV News.

The launch date of 1 January 2023 was also confirmed by OSV News.
