= Herman Joseph Alerding =

German-born American prelate (1845–1924)

His Excellency, The Right Reverend Herman Joseph Alerding
- Bishop of Fort Wayne
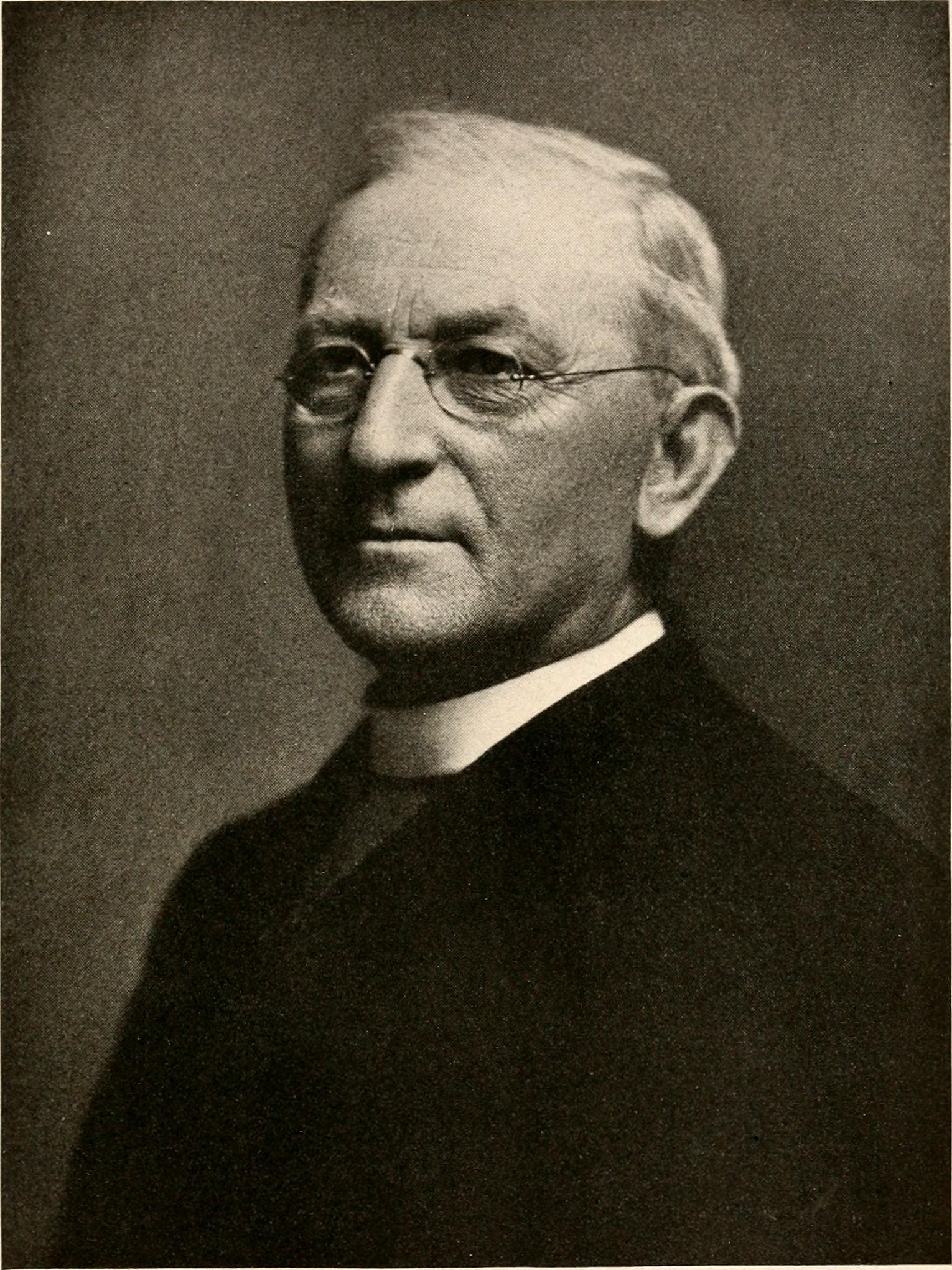
- See: Diocese of Fort Wayne
- In office: November 30, 1900 to December 6, 1924
- Predecessor: Joseph Rademacher
- Successor: John F. Noll

Orders
- Ordination: September 22, 1869 by Jacques-Maurice De Saint Palais
- Consecration: November 30, 1900 by William Henry Elder

Personal details
- Born: April 13, 1845 Westphalia, Kingdom of Prussia (now Germany)
- Died: December 6, 1924 (aged 79) Fort Wayne, Indiana, U.S.
- Buried: Cathedral of the Immaculate Conception; Fort Wayne
- Education: St. Meinrad Seminary; St. Thomas Seminary
- Motto: Salva me bona crux (Save me, O good cross)

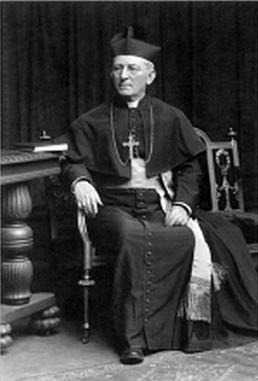
Bishop Alerding (pre-1923)

Herman Joseph Alerding (April 13, 1845 – December 6, 1924) was a German-born American prelate of the Roman Catholic Church. He served as bishop of the Diocese of Fort Wayne in Indiana from 1900 until his death in 1924.

== Biography ==
=== Early life ===
Herman Alerding was born on April 13, 1845, in Westphalia in the Kingdom of Prussia (now Germany). After his birth, the family immigrated to the United States, settling in Newport, Kentucky. He attended the parochial school of Corpus Christi Parish in Newport Alerding decided to become a priest, but Bishop George Carrell, the prelate for the local Diocese of Covington, refused to send him to seminary. Carrell did not want to pay Alerding's seminary tuition.

However, in 1858, Bishop Jacques-Maurice De Saint Palais of the nearby Diocese of Vincennes sponsored Alerding at St. Charles Borromeo Seminary near Vincennes, Indiana. When St. Charles closed in 1859, Alerding transferred to St. Thomas Seminary in Bardstown, Kentucky. He returned to Indiana in 1860 to enroll at St. Meinrad Seminary in St. Meinrad, Indiana. At the seminary, he mentored the seminarian Paul Dresser and taught him to play several musical instruments. Dresser eventually left the seminary and later became a popular composer, composing "On the Banks of the Wabash", the state song of Indiana.

After receiving the tonsure and minor orders in September 1865, Alerding was ordained to the subdiaconate on June 18, 1867, and to the diaconate on June 21.

=== Priesthood ===
Alerding was ordained to the priesthood for the Diocese of Vincennes by Saint Palais on September 22, 1869. After his ordination, Alerding served as a curate at St. Joseph Parish in Terre Haute, Indiana, while also attending several missions throughout Parke and Sullivan Counties in Indiana He was appointed pastor in 1871 of St. Elizabeth Parish in Cambridge City, Indiana. While at Cambridge City, Alerding calmed a turbulent congregation which had been under interdict from the bishop for several months. He liquidated the parish debt, and purchased a site for a new church.

Alerding was transferred to St. Joseph Parish in Indianapolis, Indiana, in 1874, there overseeing the construction of a church, rectory, and parochial school. He briefly served as procurator of the adjoining St. Joseph Seminary until it closed the following year. In 1883, Alerding published A History of the Catholic Church in the Diocese of Vincennes. Alerding was stricken by typhoid fever and took a trip to Europe to recover in 1884.

=== Bishop of Fort Wayne ===
On August 30, 1900, Alerding was appointed the fourth bishop of Fort Wayne by Pope Leo XIII. He received his episcopal consecration on November 30, 1900, from Archbishop William Elder, with Bishops Denis O'Donaghue and Henry K. Moeller serving as co-consecrators, at the Cathedral of the Immaculate Conception in Fort Wayne. He presided over a diocesan synod in November 1903. His pew-rent policy was expressly opposed by Archbishop Diomede Falconio, the apostolic delegate to the United States.

During World War I, Alerding established the Fort Wayne Diocesan War Council. In a pastoral letter issued in December 1918, Alerding declared, "We deserved the infliction of this terrible war and its awful consequences." Under Alerding's administration, the number of diocesan priests nearly doubled from 109 in 1900 to 210 in 1925. In 1900, the diocese had 102 churches with resident pastors, 39 mission churches, and 73 parochial schools; in 1924, there were 148 churches with resident pastors, 31 mission churches, and 106 parochial schools.

=== Death and legacy ===
On November 29, 1924, Alerding suffered three broken ribs when his car collided with a streetcar in Fort Wayne. Already weakened by diabetes, he never recovered from the accident. Herman Alerding died in Fort Wayne on December 6, 1924, at age 79. He was buried at the Cathedral of the Immaculate Conception in Fort Wayne.

Catholic Church titles
Preceded by Joseph Rademacher	Bishop of Fort Wayne; 1900—1924	Succeeded by John F. Noll
