= John Richard Sheets =

John Richard Sheets (September 21, 1922 – April 16, 2003) was an American Roman Catholic bishop.

Born in Omaha, Nebraska, Sheets was ordained a priest for the Society of Jesus on June 17, 1953. On May 14, 1991, he was named titular bishop of 'Murcona' and auxiliary bishop of the Roman Catholic Diocese of Fort Wayne-South Bend, Indiana, and was ordained on June 25, 1991. On September 23, 1997, Sheets retired.
