= Diocese of Fort Wayne–South Bend =

Latin Catholic jurisdiction in the US

Coordinates: 41°04′50″N 85°08′21″W

Fort Wayne–South Bend Dioecesis Wayne Castrensis–South Bendensis
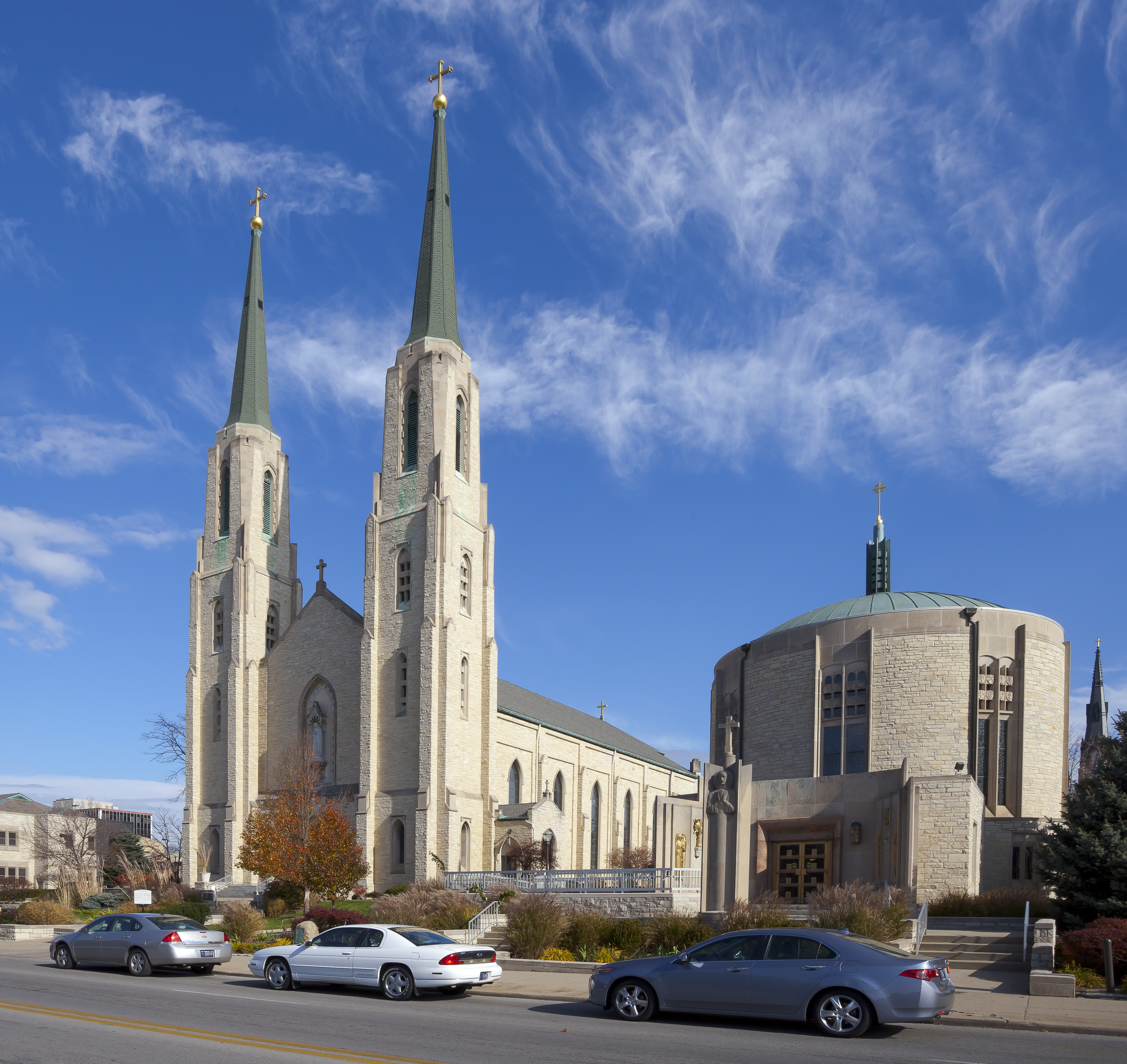
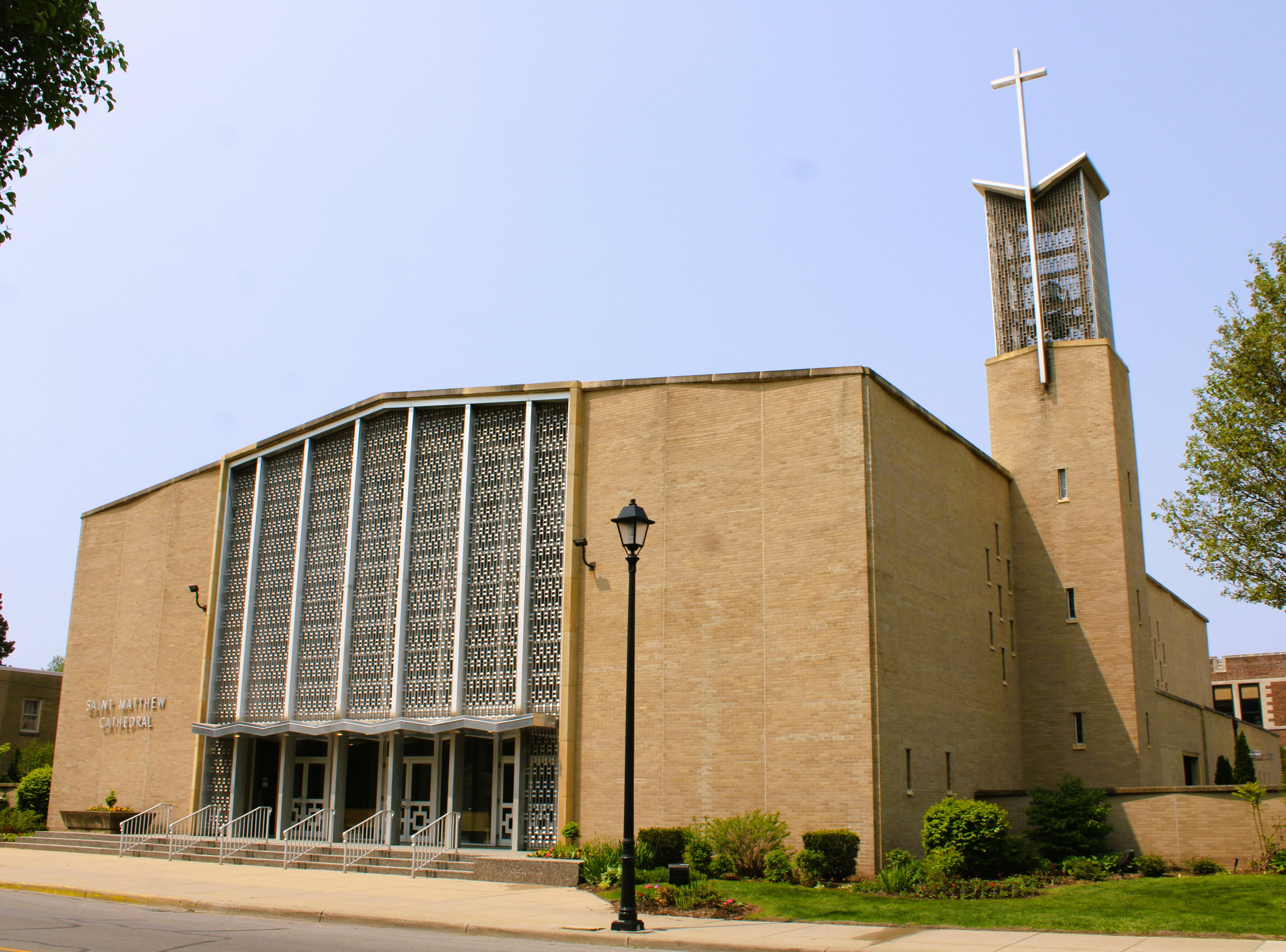
- Cathedral of the Immaculate Conception St. Matthew Cathedral

- Coat of arms

Location
- Country: United States
- Territory: Northeastern Indiana, Michiana
- Ecclesiastical province: Indianapolis

Statistics
- Area: 5,792 km^{2} (2,236 sq mi)
- Population: Total; Catholics: (as of 2006); 1,247,850; 159,888 (12.8%)
- Parishes: 84

Information
- Denomination: Catholic
- Sui iuris church: Latin Church
- Rite: Roman Rite
- Established: January 8, 1857 (169 years ago)
- Cathedral: Cathedral of the Immaculate Conception (Fort Wayne)
- Co-cathedral: Saint Matthew Cathedral (South Bend)
- Patron saint: Immaculate Conception

Current leadership
- Pope: Leo XIV
- Bishop: Kevin C. Rhoades
- Metropolitan Archbishop: Charles C. Thompson

Map
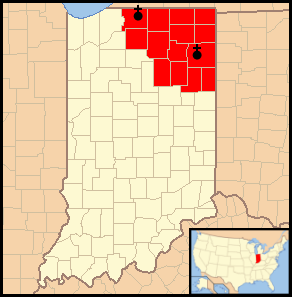

Website
- diocesefwsb.org

The Diocese of Fort Wayne–South Bend (Latin: Dioecesis Wayne Castrensis–South Bendensis) is a diocese of the Catholic Church in north-central and northeastern Indiana in the United States. The Cathedral of the Immaculate Conception in Fort Wayne is the see's primary cathedral; Saint Matthew's Cathedral in South Bend is the associate cathedral. Kevin C. Rhoades is the bishop.

== Territory ==
The Diocese of Fort Wayne–South Bend encompasses 14 Indiana counties:

Adams, Allen, DeKalb, Elkhart, Huntington, Kosciusko, LaGrange, Marshall, Noble, Steuben, St. Joseph, Wabash, Wells, Whitley.

== History ==
=== 1700 to 1800 ===
The Indiana area was part of the French colony of New France during the 17th century and the first half of the 18th century. It was explored by French fur traders and missionaries under the Bishop of Quebec. It became British territory after the French and Indian War ended in 1763; however, the British government refused to allow American colonists to enter the region.

Several years after the American Revolution ended in 1783, Pope Pius VI in 1789 erected the Diocese of Baltimore, covering the entire United States. John Francis served as vicar-general in the west from 1798 until his death in 1804.

=== 1800 to 1850 ===
In 1808, Pope Pius VII erected the Diocese of Bardstown, with jurisdiction over the Indiana Territory and other areas in the Midwest. In 1832, the missionary Stephen Badin established a mission church at South Bend in what was now the State of Indiana.

In 1834, Pope Gregory XVI erected the Diocese of Vincennes, encompassing all of Indiana and the eastern third of Illinois. The pope named Simon Bruté, president of Mount St. Mary's College in Emmitsburg, Maryland, as its first bishop.

In 1835, Bruté was at South Bend in the course of a 600-mile visitation of the diocese. The first parish in Fort Wayne was St. Augustine's, erected in 1836. Its church was dedicated in 1939. It later became the Cathedral of the Immaculate Conception.

The first St. Patrick's Church in Lagro was constructed in 1838 for Irish workers on the Wabash and Erie Canal. Also in 1838, the first St. Vincent de Paul Church, a log cabin in Logansport, was constructed to also serve canal workers.Bruté died in 1839. In 1840, Julian Benoit purchased land in Fort Wayne for the Cathedral of the Immaculate Conception. Benoit routinely covered over a dozen mission stations by canal boat or horseback.

In 1842, Bishop Célestin de la Hailandière of Vincennes offered a parcel of land in South Bend to Edouard Sorin of the Congregation of Holy Cross to build a college. Sorin arrived in South Bend in November 1842, and began the school using Badin's old log chapel. This was the start of the University of Notre Dame. Sorin in 1853 built the St. Alexis Chapel on the college property. It later became part of St. Joseph Parish, the first in South Bend.

=== 1850 to 1900 ===
The Sisters of the Holy Cross in 1855 moved their Saint Mary's Academy, a school for girls, from Bertrand, Michigan, to Notre Dame, Indiana. Today it is Saint Mary's College.

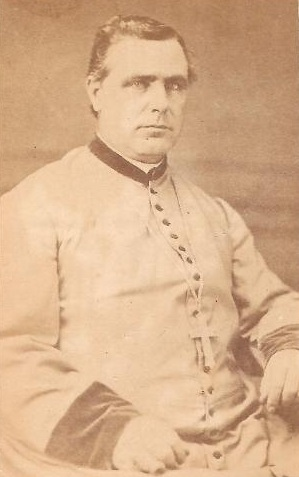
Bishop Dwenger (pre-1893)

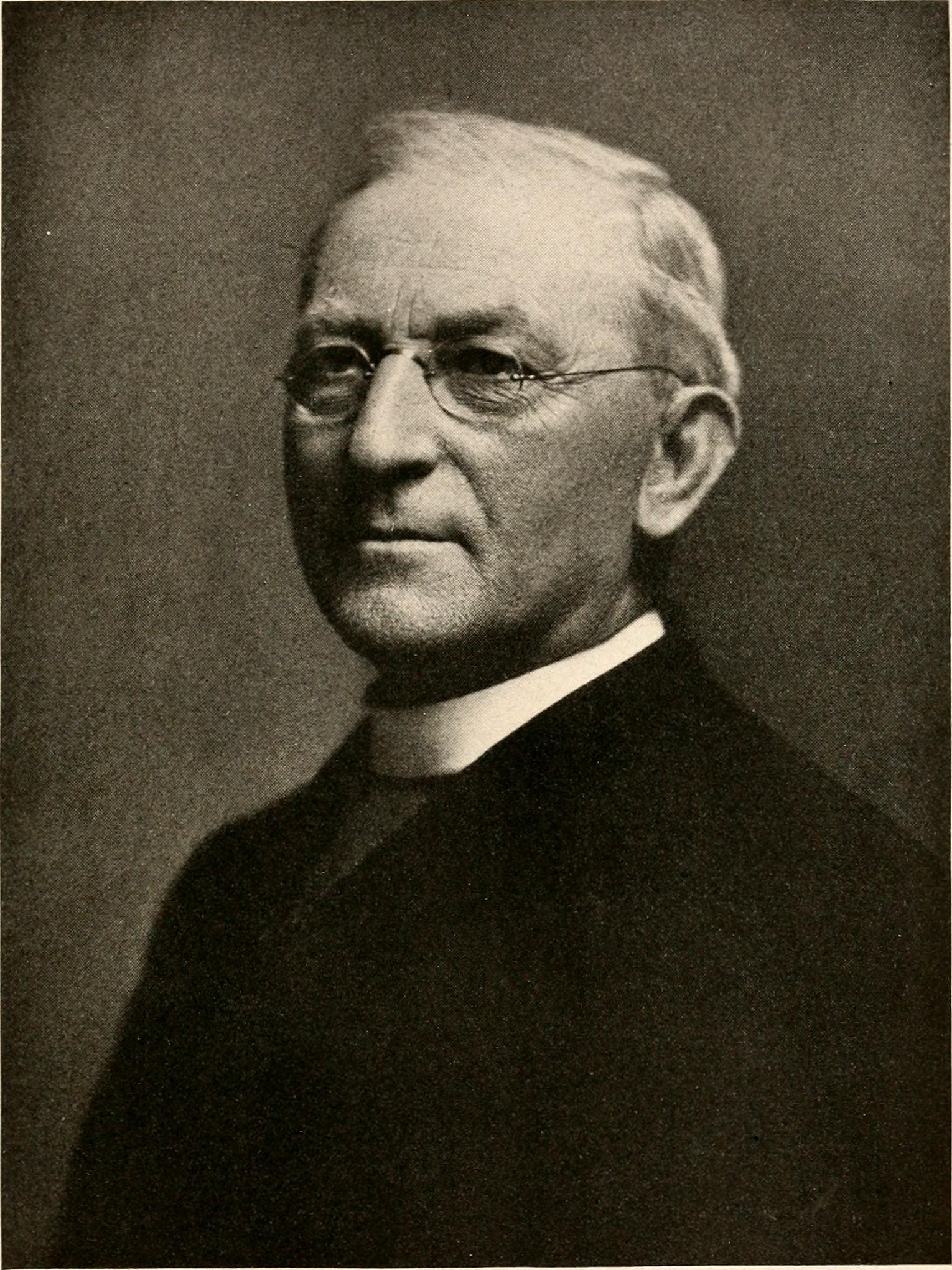
Bishop Alerding (1919)

In 1857, Pope Pius IX established the Diocese of Fort Wayne, taking its territory from the Diocese of Vincennes. The pope appointed John Luers of the Diocese of Cincinnati as the first bishop of Fort Wayne.

In 1863, Luers held a synod of priests at the University of Notre Dame in which he established the laws and constitution for the diocese. That same year, due to the large German-speaking population in the diocese, Luers invited the Poor Handmaids of Jesus Christ, a German religious order, to come to the diocese. He also founded the Catholic Clerical Benevolent Association of the Diocese of Fort Wayne for the support of elderly and sick priests. Luers died in 1871.

In 1872, Pope Pius IX appointed Joseph Dwenger of the Missionaries of the Precious Blood as the second bishop of Fort Wayne. Dwenger promoted the parochial school system. The Sisters of St. Joseph in 1882 opened St. Joseph Hospital in South Bend. Today it is part of Saint Joseph Health System. In 1886, Dwenger erected the St. Vincent Orphan Asylum for orphan girls at Fort Wayne, to be operated by the Poor Handmaids of Jesus Christ. Dwenger died in 1893 after 21 years as bishop of Fort Wayne.

Bishop Joseph Rademacher of the Diocese of Nashville was named bishop of Fort Wayne in 1893 by Pope Leo XIII.

=== 1900 to 1930 ===
Rademacher died in 1900. The same pope then selected Herman Alerding, of Vincennes as Rademacher's replacement later that year. At Alerding's request, the Sisters of the Holy Family of Nazareth came to the diocese in 1902 to work in the parochial schools.

The Franciscan Sisters of the Sacred Heart opened Sacred Heart Hospital in Garrett in 1901. In 1906, a contingent of the Sisters of St. Francis of Maryville arrived in Peru, Indiana, to take charge of the Wabash Railroad Hospital. It had been erected by the Wabash Railroad to serve its many workers in the Peru area. The sisters renamed it St. Ann's Hospital.

After the American entry into World War I in 1917, Alerding established the Fort Wayne Diocesan War Council. Alerding died in 1924. Under Alerding's administration, the number of diocesan priests rose from 109 in 1900 to 210 in 1925. In 1900, the diocese had 102 churches with resident pastors, 39 mission churches, and 73 parochial schools; by 1924, there were 148 churches with pastors, 31 mission churches, and 106 schools. Alerding died in 1924.

The Poor Handmaids of Jesus Christ in 1925 established Ancilla Domini in Donaldson as an extension of DePaul University in Chicago. Its purpose was to educate members of their order. Today Ancilla Domini College is a campus of Marianne University Plymouth.

John F. Noll of Fort Wayne was appointed as the fifth bishop of that diocese by Pope Pius XI in 1925. Noll supervised construction of a preparatory seminary and several high schools.

=== 1930 to 1950 ===
During the Great Depression of the 1930s, Noll reorganized the system of Catholic charities. In 1932, he replaced the old St. Vincent Orphan Asylum with a newer facility, the St. Vincent Villa for both boys and girls.

Pope Pius XII erected the Diocese of Lafayette in Indiana in October 1944, with territory from the Diocese of Fort Wayne. The pope erected the Archdiocese of Indianapolis in October also, with the Diocese of Fort Wayne becoming its suffragan. The Sisters of St. Francis of Perpetual Adoration in 1944 relocated St. Francis College from Lafayette to Fort Wayne. Today it is the University of Saint Francis. The Crozier Order in 1948 opened the Our Lady of the Lake Seminary in a former hotel on Lake Wawasee in Syracuse, Indiana.

=== 1950 to 2000 ===
Noll died in July 1956. In December 1956, Pius XII erected the Diocese of Gary, removing Lake, Porter, LaPorte, and Starke Counties from the Diocese of Fort Wayne. Also in December, the pope named Auxiliary Bishop Leo Pursley of Fort Wayne as Noll's replacement. In 1960, Pope John XXIII renamed the Diocese of Fort Wayne as the Diocese of Fort Wayne–South Bend. The Holy Cross Brothers in 1966 opened Holy Cross College, a two-year college in Notre Dame, to educate the members of the order. Today it is a four-year liberal arts college open to men and women.

After Pursley retired as bishop of Fort Wayne-South Bend in 1976, Pope Paul VI appointed Auxiliary Bishop William McManus of the Archdiocese of Chicago as the next bishop of the diocese. He retired as bishop of the diocese in 1985. McManus' successor was Auxiliary Bishop John Michael D'Arcy from the Archdiocese of Boston, named by Pope John Paul II in 1985. D'Arcy served as bishop until his retirement in 2009.

=== 2000 to present ===
The diocese in 2008 announced the merger of Sacred Heart Parish in Lakeville and St. Parish in South Bend,to form St. Catherine of Siena Parish. In 2008, court papers revealed that Bishop Pursley in 1972 wrote to Bishop John Marshall of the Diocese of Burlington about Edward Paquette, a priest who wanted to transfer from Fort Wayne-South Bend to Vermont. In his letter, Pursley warned Marshall that Paquette had been accused of molesting boys and should, if accepted in Vermont, be kept away from children. Marshall allowed Paquette to transfer, but ignored Pursley's advice to restrict him. In 2008, the Diocese of Burlington paid out a $8.7 million settlement to a Vermont sexual abuse victim of Paquette.

In 2009, Pope Benedict XVI named Kevin C. Rhoades, previously bishop of the Diocese of Harrisburg, as bishop of Fort Wayne-South Bend. The diocese in August 2024 announced the merger of St. Hedwig and St. Patrick Parishes in South Bend on the recommendations of their pastors.

In 2018, Bishop Rhoades released a list of 18 priests and deacons who previously served the diocese and were credibly accused of sexually abusing minors. Eric Burgener, the parochial vicar at St. Vincent de Paul Parish in Fort Wayne, was removed from public ministry in January 2022 by the diocese. A woman had reported credible accusations to the diocese of Burgener having boundary issues.

Rhodes in September 2024 issued guidelines for schools on dealing with transgender students. The schools were instructed to use the person's biological pronoun and have them use the restrooms for their biological sex. Rhodes also called for compassion for those struggling with what he termed "gender dysphoria"

The diocese, along with administrators of Bishop Luers High School, were sued in January 2025 by 38 female alumni of the school. The plaintiffs claimed that the school failed to notify police or the girls' parents in 2023 when three male students started selling deepfake videos of the victims superimposed in pornographic videos.

In February 2026, Rhodes criticized the appointment of Susan Ostermann by the University of Notre Dame to lead its Liu Institute for Asia and Asian Studies. Rhodes objected to Ostermann's support of abortion legalization. That same month, Ostermann decided not to take the position.

== Bishops ==
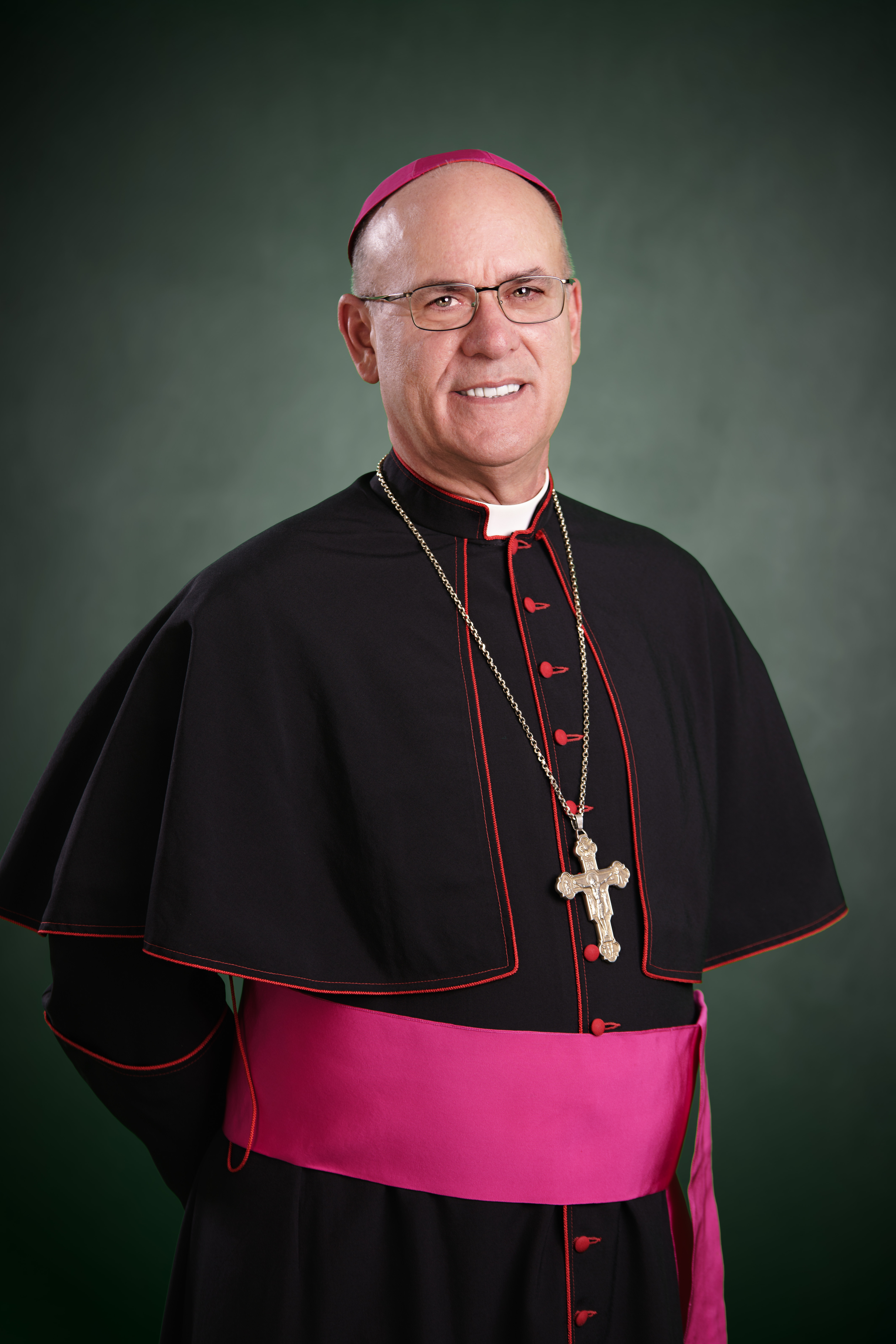
Bishop Rhoades

=== Bishops of Fort Wayne ===
1. John Henry Luers (1857–1871)
2. Joseph Gregory Dwenger (1872–1893)
3. Joseph Rademacher (1893–1900)
4. Herman Joseph Alerding (1900–1924)
5. John F. Noll (1925–1956) – elevated to Archbishop ad personam in 1953

=== Bishops of Fort Wayne–South Bend ===
1. Leo Aloysius Pursley (1956–1976) (diocese name changed in 1960)
2. William Edward McManus (1976–1985)
3. John Michael D'Arcy (1985–2009)
4. Kevin Carl Rhoades (2009–present)

=== Auxiliary bishops ===
- Leo Aloysius Pursley (1950–1955)
- Joseph Robert Crowley (1971–1990)
- John Richard Sheets, S.J. (1991–1997)
- Daniel R. Jenky, C.S.C. (1997–2002), appointed Bishop of Peoria

=== Other diocesan priests who became bishops ===
- John George Bennett, appointed Bishop of Lafayette in Indiana in 1945
- Andrew Gregory Grutka, appointed Bishop of Gary in 1956

== Education ==
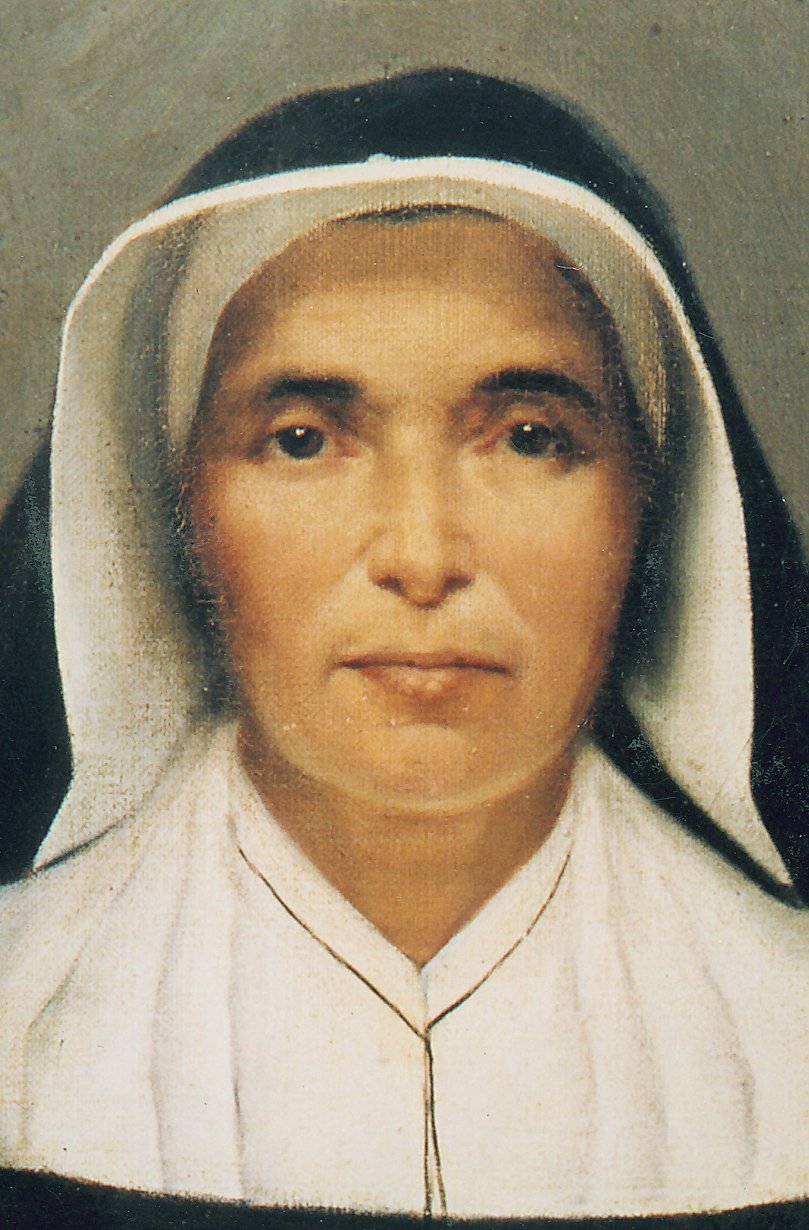
Mother Theodore Guerin (1856)

Mother Theodore Guérin, founder of the Sisters of Providence of Saint Mary-of-the-Woods is considered the patron of education in the Diocese of Fort Wayne–South Bend.

=== Colleges and universities ===
- Ancilla Domini College – Donaldson. It is a campus of Marian University Plymouth in Indianapolis.
- Holy Cross College – Notre Dame
- Saint Mary's College – Notre Dame
- University of Notre Dame – Notre Dame
- University of Saint Francis – Fort Wayne

=== Secondary schools ===
- Bishop Dwenger High School – Fort Wayne
- Bishop Luers High School – Fort Wayne
- Marian High School – Mishawaka
- Saint Joseph High School – South Bend

== Coat of arms ==
Coat of arms of Diocese of Fort Wayne–South Bend
Notes The coat of arms was designed and adopted when the diocese was erected Adopted 1960 Escutcheon The arms of the diocese are composed of a crescent moon at the top with a fortified wall below it. The wall contains three Bottony crosses. Below the wall is a river bend flowing diagonally with a fleur-de-lis on it. A six-winged seraph stands between the river and the wall . Symbolism The crescent moon represents Mary, mother of Jesus, patroness of the diocese. The three crosses represent the Holy Trinity. The fortified wall represents Fort Wayne. The angel identifies the patron of the cathedral in South Bend. The wavy line represents South Bend. The fleur-de-lis recalls the colonization of this region by French Catholics.

== Catholic radio within the diocese ==
- WRDF "Redeemer Radio" 106.3 FM in Fort Wayne
- WRDI "Redeemer Radio" 95.7 FM in South Bend

== Ecclesiastical Province of Indianapolis ==
See: List of the Catholic bishops of the United States#Province of Indianapolis
