= Cathedral of the Immaculate Conception (Fort Wayne, Indiana) =

Historic church in Indiana, United States

- U.S. National Register of Historic Places
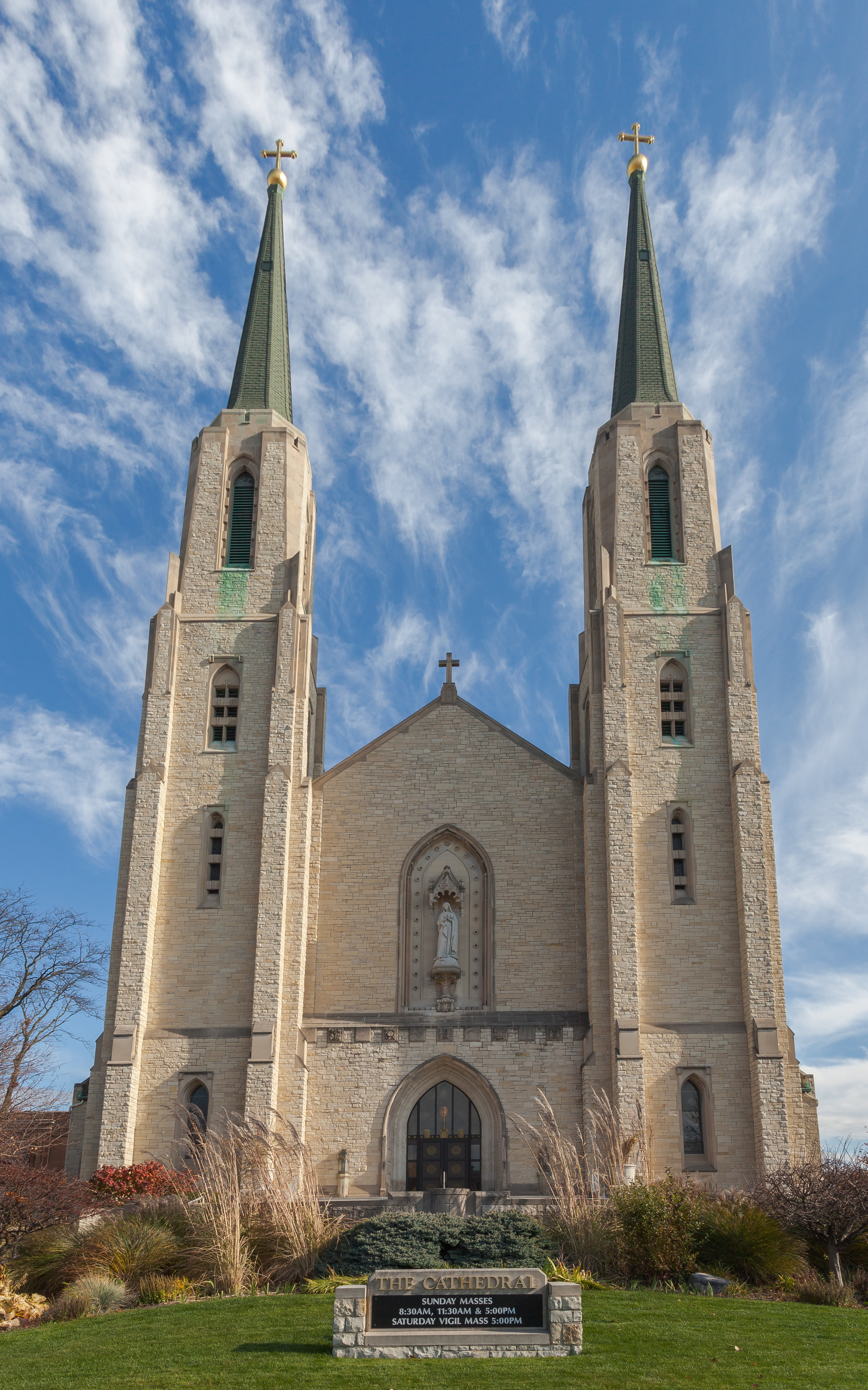
- West façade in November 2012

- Location within Indiana Location within the United States
- Location: 915 South Clinton Street, Fort Wayne, IN 46802, (corner of Jefferson and Calhoun Streets) Fort Wayne, Indiana
- Coordinates: 41°4′32.51″N 85°8′16.19″W
- Area: less than one acre
- Built: 1859-1860
- Architect: Benoit, Rev. Msgr Julian
- Architectural style: Gothic
- NRHP reference No.: 80000048
- Added to NRHP: October 23, 1980

The Cathedral of the Immaculate Conception in Fort Wayne, Indiana, in the United States, is the primary cathedral of the Roman Catholic Diocese of Fort Wayne-South Bend, headed by Bishop Kevin C. Rhoades.

St. Augustine Parish was erected in Fort Wayne in 1836 and its church was constructed in 1839. The church was designated as St. Augustine Cathedral in 1857, but was destroyed by fire in 1859. The new Cathedral of the Immaculate Conception was built on the St. Augustine property and was dedicated in 1860.

== History ==
=== St. Augustine Church ===
The first Catholic priest to minister in present-day Fort Wayne was Reverend Steven Badin, the first priest ordained into the United States. He was assigned by the Diocese of Vincennes in 1830 to the Potawatamie mission in the area. The next year, he assisted Catholic settlers with purchasing a plot of land from Peace-Chief Jean-Baptiste de Richardville for construction of a new church.

In 1836, the diocese named Reverend Louis Mueller as the first resident pastor in the Fort Wayne area. In 1839, Mueller built St. Augustine's, a small log church on the property that was purchased in 1831. This would be the forerunner of the Cathedral of Immaculate Conception Parish.

Reverend Julian Benoit became pastor of St. Augustine's in 1840. He paid off the parish debt and purchased more property next to St. Augustine's, initially for use as a cemetery. In 1849, the German-speaking parishioners of St. Augustine's created St. Mary's Parish, a national church that is today defunct. St. Augustine parish constructed a rectory in 1854.

=== St. Augustine Cathedral ===
In 1857, Pope Pius IX erected the Diocese of Fort Wayne and appointed John Luers as its first bishop. Luers designated St. Augustine's Church as his cathedral, while planning for a larger, more permanent facility. St. Augustine's Cathedral was destroyed by fire in early 1859.

The cornerstone for the new cathedral was laid in the spring of 1859. Benoit, who designed it, named it the Cathedral of the Immaculate Conception, in honor of the Blessed Virgin. Benoit was the primary fundraiser, making trips to New Orleans, Louisiana, and France, where he raised $46,000. He used his personal wealth to cover a large portion of the construction costs of Immaculate Conception. The new cathedral was built over the existing cemetery. The cost, including a pipe organ and pews, was $63,000.

=== Cathedral of the Immaculate Conception ===
The Cathedral of the Immaculate Conception was dedicated on December 8, 1860. The next year, the diocese installed 19 large stained glass windows along with a sanctuary window of the Virgin Mary, all manufactured in France.

In 1896, Immaculate Conception underwent its first renovation, supervised by its rector, Monsignor Joseph H. Brammer. Twelve stained-glass windows were commissioned from the Royal Bavarian Art Institute in Munich, depicting scenes from the life of Mary. Brammer also imported wood-carved Stations of the Cross from Germany.

In 1901, the diocese erected a bishop's residence and chancery on the Immaculate Conception campus; these buildings were paid for by the sale of a diocesan farm in Jasper County. During the early 1900s, two entrances were installed on the west side of the cathedral.

The diocese constructed the MacDougal Memorial Chapel and chancery in 1950 on space formerly occupied by two parish schools. At that time, the brick exterior of the cathedral was covered with Lannon stone from Wisconsin.

== Architecture ==
The Cathedral of the Immaculate Conception is 80 feet (24 m) wide by 180 feet (55 m) long. Its two bell towers, topped by spires, rise 200 feet (61 m) from the ground. The exterior facade is faced with Indiana limestone and Lannon stone from Wisconsin.

The brass candlesticks with the figures of the apostles came from France. The crucifix and altar stone were salvaged from St. Augustine Church after its fire.

Cathedral images

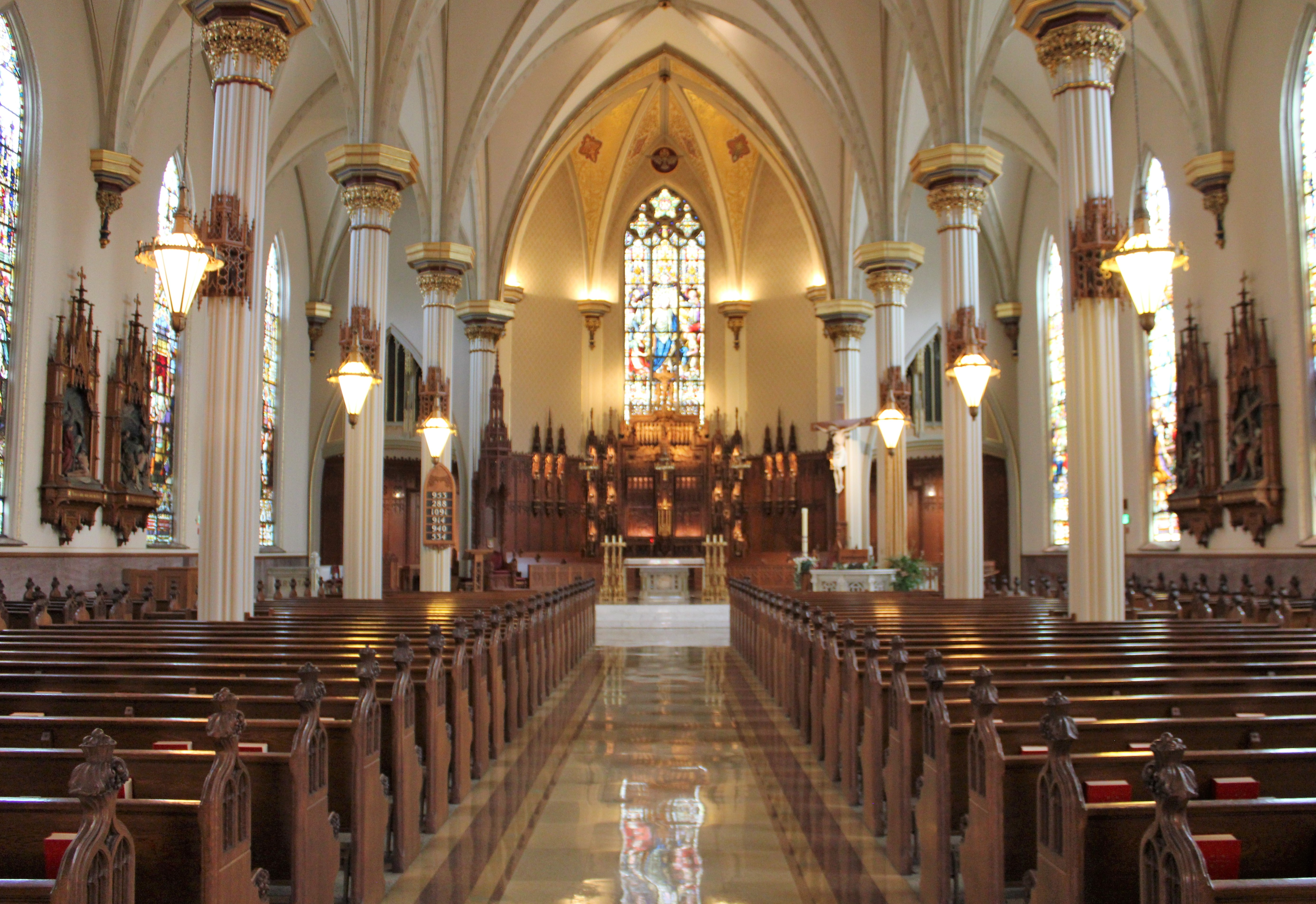
Chancel, Immaculate Conception Cathedral (2023)

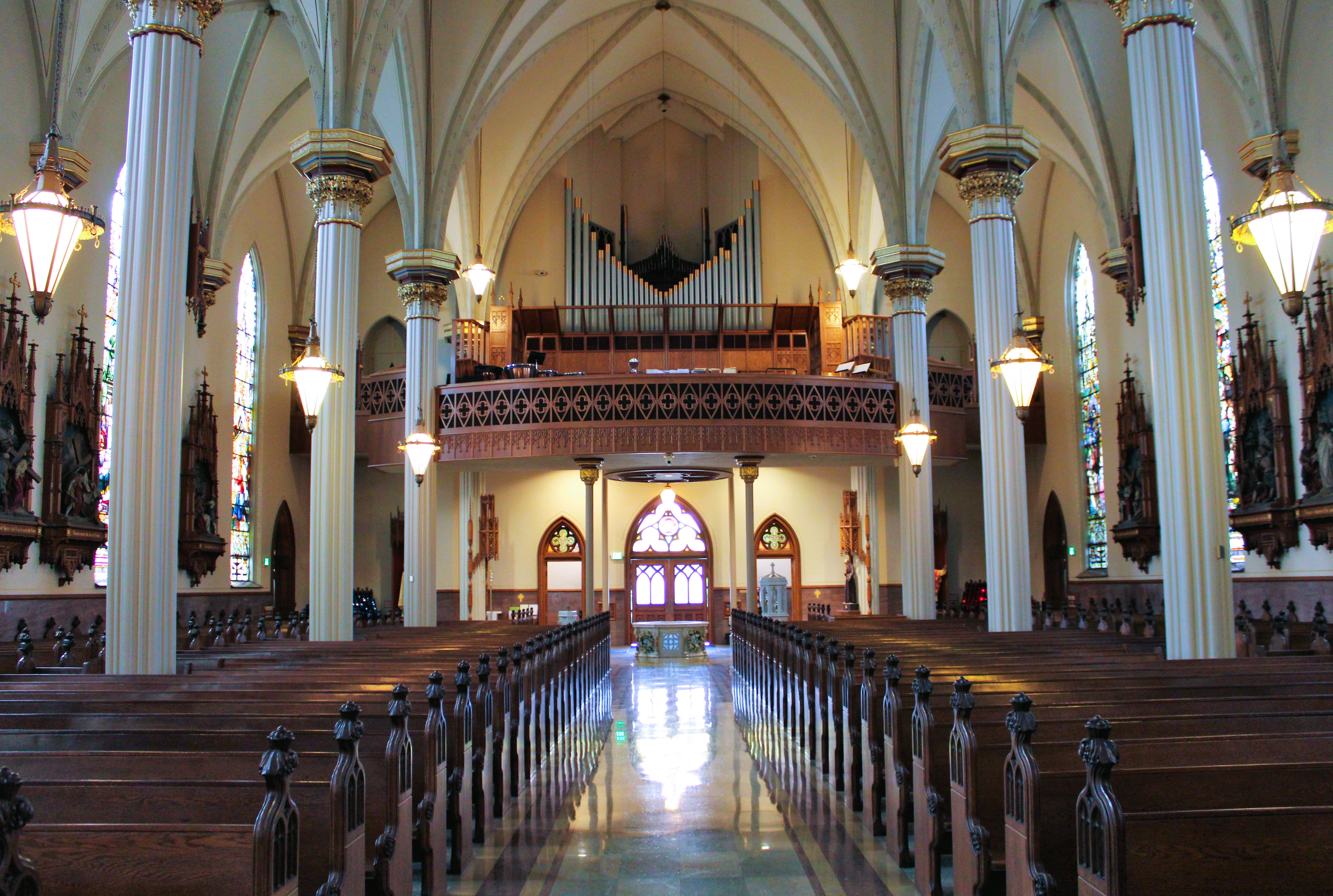
Gallery, Immaculate Conception Cathedral (2023)

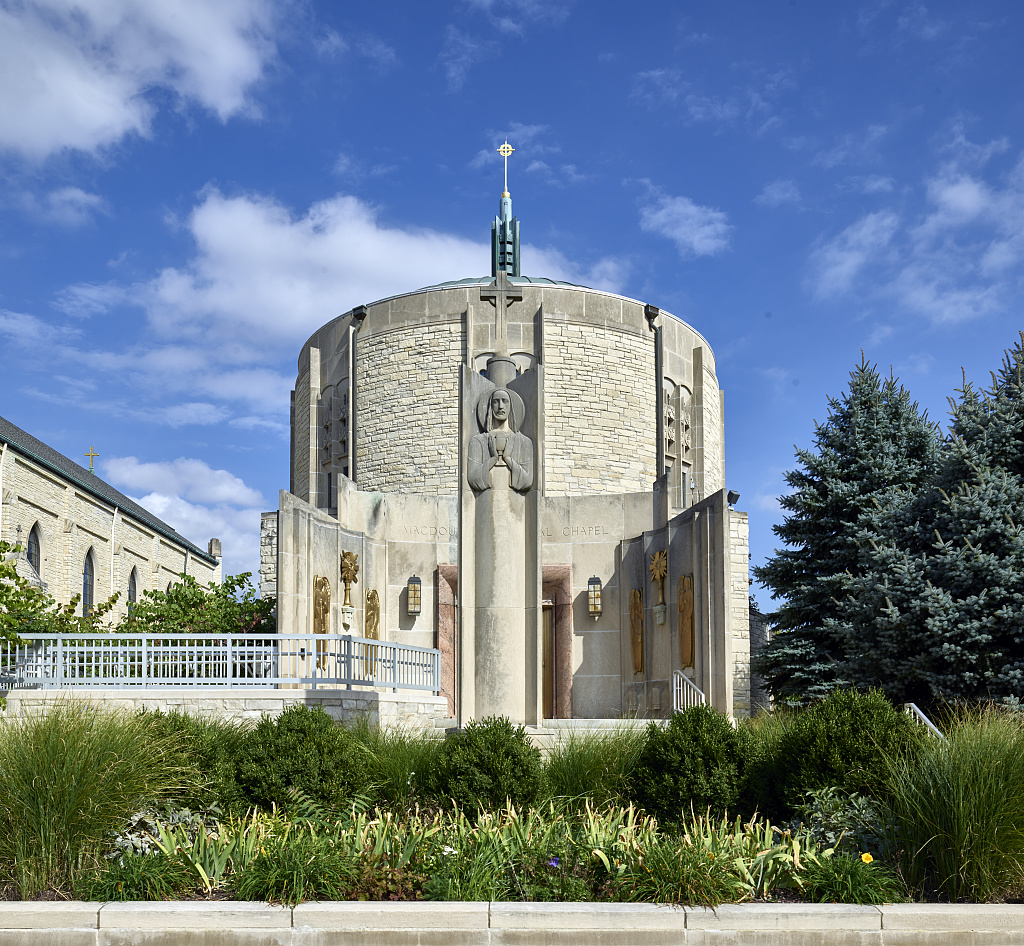
Guérin Chapel (2016)

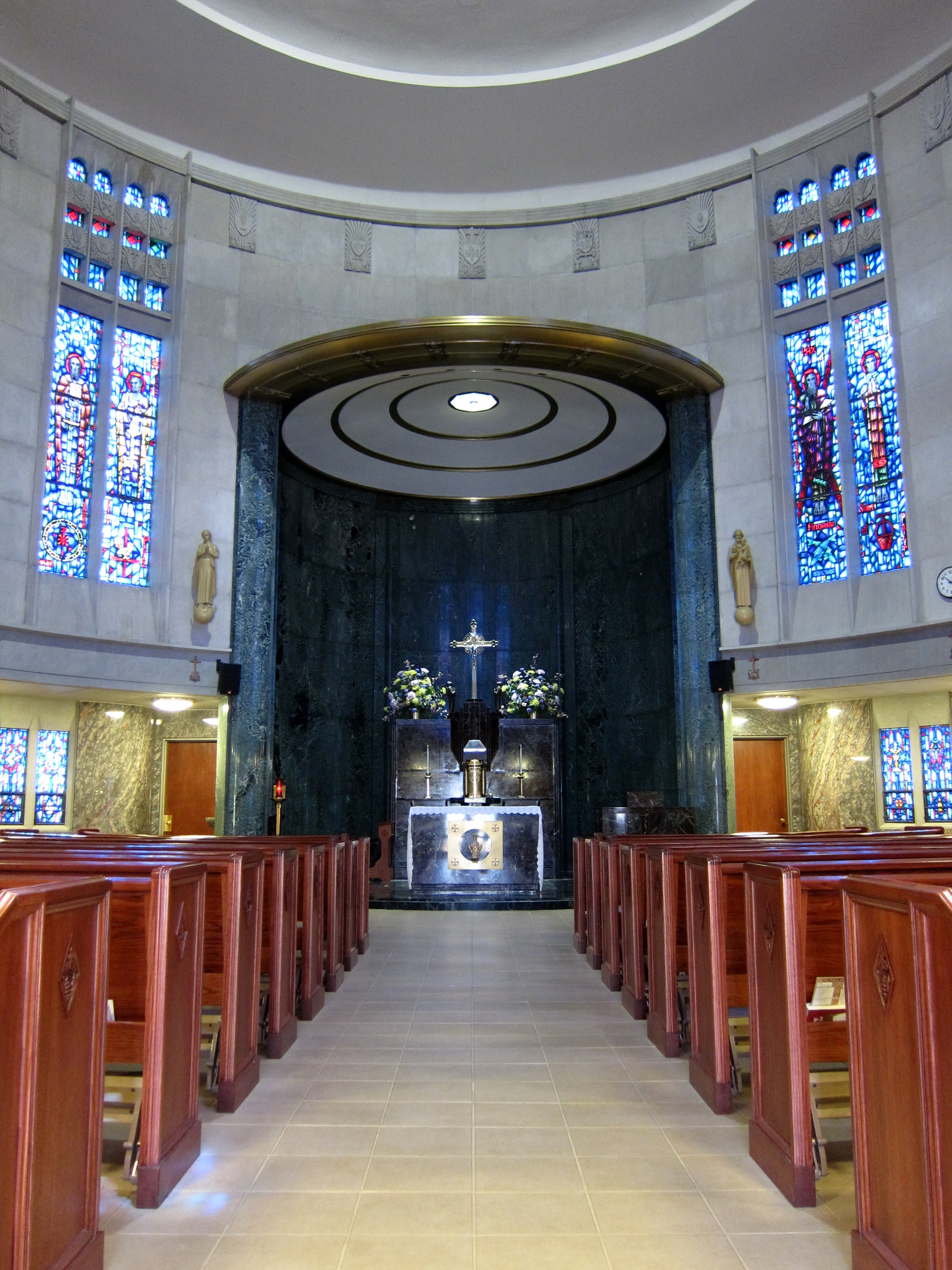
Interior, Guérin Chapel (2012)

== Burials ==
- Monsignor Julian Benoit (1885)
- Bishop John Henry Luers (1871)
- Bishop Joseph Dwenger (1893)
- Bishop Herman Joseph Alerding (1924)

== Present day ==
The cathedral building still stands today, maintained through various renovations over the decades, the most recent by Schenkel and Sons, Inc.

The cathedral grounds, called the Cathedral Square, includes the diocesan chancery, the MacDougal Chapel, the Cathedral Center for C.C.D. classes (formerly the Cathedral Boys School), and the rectory and the grave of Chief Joseph Richardville. Recently, the Cathedral Museum housed in the basement of MacDougal Chapel and diocesan offices located in the Cathedral Center were moved to a new location a few blocks north of Cathedral Square.

It was listed on the National Register of Historic Places in 1980.

== Current pastoral staff ==
- Rector - Reverend Jacob D. Runyon
- Associate pastors - Reverend Peter Dee De and Reverend Wimal Jayasuria

== See also ==
- List of Catholic cathedrals in the United States
- Roman Catholic Marian churches
- List of tallest buildings in Fort Wayne
