= Kasper (surname) =

Kasper is a German surname. Notable people with the surname include:

- Adam Kasper, American record producer
- Antonín Kasper (disambiguation), several people with this name
- Carlos Kasper (born 1994), German politician
- Charlotte Kasper (born 1998), American curator
- Cy Kasper (1895–1991), American football player and coach
- Dave Kasper, American soccer player
- Dawn Kasper (born 1977), American artist
- Debbie Kasper, American television writer and comedian
- Dennis Kasper (born 1943), American microbiologist and immunologist
- Drew Kasper, American wrestler known as Brutus Creed, of the Creed Brothers
- Gian-Franco Kasper (1944–2021), Swiss ski official
- Hans Kasper (1939–2023), German politician
- Herbert Kasper (1926–2020), American fashion designer
- Jacob Kasper, American wrestler known as Julius Creed, of the Creed Brothers
- James Kasper (born 1945), American politician
- Jan Kasper (1932–2005), Czech ice hockey player
- John Kasper (1929–1998), American activist
- John Kasper (bobsleigh) (born 1968), American bobsledder
- John Kasper (cricketer) (1946–2020), New Zealand cricketer
- Judith D. Kasper (1948–2021), American aging researcher
- Julia Kasper, New Zealand entomologist
- Kevin Kasper (born 1977), American football player in the National Football League
- Kalle Käsper, Estonian writer
- Kateryna Kasper (born 1986), Ukrainian soprano
- Kirsten Kasper, American triathlete
- Len Kasper (born 1971), American television broadcaster for the Chicago Cubs
- Ludwig Kasper (1893–1945), Austrian sculptor
- Lynne Rossetto Kasper, American food writer and radio journalist
- Marco Kasper (born 2004), Austrian ice hockey player
- Maria Katharina Kasper (1820–1898), German founder of the Poor Handmaids of Jesus Christ
- Manuela Kasper-Claridge (born 1959), German journalist
- Nolan Kasper (born 1989), American alpine skier
- Peter Kasper (ice hockey) (born 1974), Austrian ice hockey player
- Peter Kasper (volleyball) (born 1985), Slovak volleyball player
- Philip H. Kasper (1866-1942), American farmer and businessman
- Rick Kasper, Canadian mason and politician
- Romy Kasper (born 1988), German racing cyclist
- Steve Kasper (born 1961), Canadian ice hockey player
- Veljo Käsper (1930–1982), Estonian film director
- Walter Kasper (born 1933), German cleric
- Wolfgang Kasper (1939–2023), Australian economist

== See also ==
- Käsper (surname), Estonian surname
- Kasper (disambiguation), including more people with similar surnames
- Casper (disambiguation)
