= Gaspare =

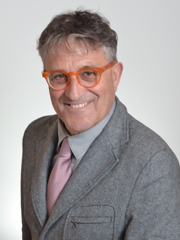
Italian politician Gaspare Antonio

Gaspare (also Gaspero, Gasperino and Gasparro) is an Italian male given name, the literal translation of the English name Casper and Jasper (French Gaspard, Scandinavian Kasper and Jesper).

The name is rare in contemporary times, but was common enough in the past such that it is the root of a number of Italian surnames, such as De Gasperi, Gasperini, Gasparini, and Gasparri.

It may refer to:

== Given name ==
- Gasparo Angiolini
- Gaspare Ambrosini
- Gasparo Berti
- Gaspare Colosimo
- Gasparo Contarini
- Gaspare Finali (1829–1949), Italian academic and politician
- Gasparo Gozzi
- Gaspare DiGregorio
- Gaspare "Gap" Mangione
- Gaspare Messina
- Gaspare Pacchierotti
- Gasparo da Salò
- Gaspare Spontini
- Gasparo Tagliacozzi
- Gaslare Monteleone

== Surname ==
- Oronzo Vito Gasparo

== See also ==
- Gasparro (surname)
