= Caspers =

Caspers is a German language surname‍ that stems from the male given name Casper. Notable people with the name include:

- Barbara Caspers (active 1980), Australian paralympic shooter
- Dirk Caspers (born 1980), German former footballer
- Ella Caspers (fl. 1909), Australian contralto
- Johannes Caspers (1910–1986), German politician
- Lutz Caspers (born 1943), German athlete
- Marion Caspers-Merk (born 1955), German politician

== See also ==
- Casper (given name)
- Casper (surname)
- Casper (disambiguation)
