= Käsper =

Family name

The Estonian-language surname Käsper may refer to:

- Kalle Käsper (born 1952), Estonian writer
- Gohar Markosjan-Käsper (1949–2015), Armenian writer who lived in Estonia
- Veljo Käsper (1930–1982), Estonian screenwriter and film director

== See also ==
- Casper
- Kasper (surname)
