= Kašpárek =

Kašpárek (feminine: Kašpárková) or Kasparek is a Czech and Polish (of Czech origin) surname, which is a diminutive of the given name Kaspar. Notable people with the surname include:

- Franciszek Kasparek, Polish jurist and professor
- Fritz Kasparek (1910–1954), Austrian mountaineer
- Leopoldine Kasparek (1893–1921), Austrian serial killer
- Magda Kašpárková, Czech handball player
- Rolf Kasparek, German musician
- Šárka Kašpárková (born 1971), Czech former track and field athlete
- Stanislav Kašpárek, Czech handball player

== See also ==
- Kašpárek is also the Czech name of the puppet Kasperle
