= Joseph Rademacher (bishop) =

American prelate

His Excellency, The Right Reverend Joseph Rademacher
- Bishop of Fort Wayne
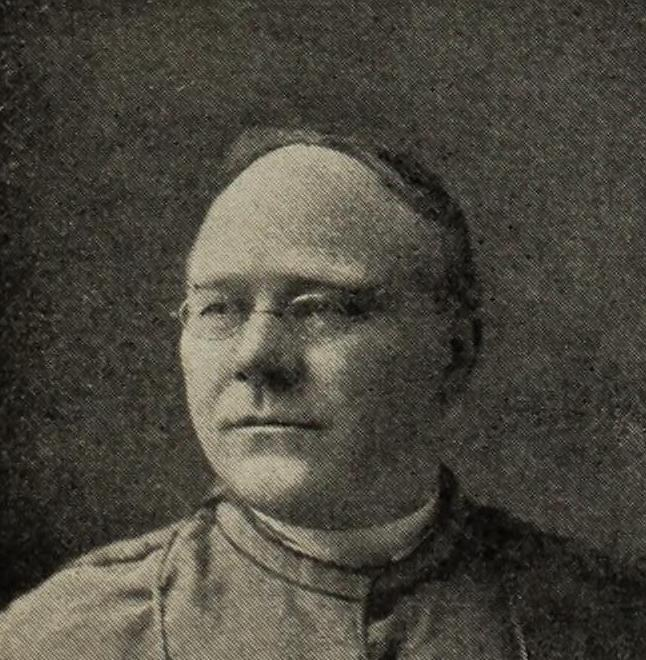
- Church: Roman Catholic Church
- See: Diocese of Fort Wayne
- Predecessor: Patrick Feehan
- Successor: Thomas Sebastian Byrne
- Other posts: Bishop of Nashville; 1883 to 1893

Orders
- Ordination: August 2, 1863 by John Henry Luers
- Consecration: June 24, 1883 by Patrick Feehan

Personal details
- Born: December 3, 1840 Westphalia, Michigan, US
- Died: June 12, 1900 (aged 59) Chicago, Illinois, US
- Education: St. Vincent's College; St. Michael's Seminary
- Motto: Crux spes unica (Hail to the cross, our only hope)

Joseph Rademacher (December 3, 1840 – June 12, 1900) was an American prelate of the Roman Catholic Church. He served as bishop of the Diocese of Nashville in Tennessee from 1883 to 1893 and as bishop of the Diocese of Fort Wayne in Indiana from 1893 until his death in 1900.

== Biography ==
=== Early life ===
Joseph Rademacher was born on December 3, 1840, in Westphalia, Michigan, to Bernard and Theresia (née Platte) Rademacher, both German immigrants. In 1855, he began his classical and philosophical studies under the Benedictines at St. Vincent's College in Latrobe, Pennsylvania. He completed his theological studies at St. Michael's Seminary in Pittsburgh.

=== Priesthood ===
Rademacher was ordained to the priesthood for the Diocese of Fort Wayne by Bishop John Luers on August 2, 1863. After his ordination, the diocese assigned Rademacher as the first resident pastor in Attica, Indiana, also attending to the nearby missions. In 1870, he was transferred to a parish in Columbia City, Indiana. In 1872, Rademacher was appointed chancellor of the diocese and pastor of St. Mary's Parish in Fort Wayne, Indiana. He served as pastor of St. Mary of the Immaculate Conception Parish in Lafayette, Indiana, from 1880 to 1883.

=== Bishop of Nashville ===
On April 3, 1883, Rademacher was appointed as the fourth bishop of Nashville by Pope Leo XIII. He received his episcopal consecration at St. Mary's Catholic Cathedral in Nashville on June 24, 1883, from Archbishop Patrick Feehan, with Bishops Joseph Dwenger and John Watterson serving as co-consecrators.

=== Bishop of Fort Wayne ===
Rademacher was named the third bishop of Fort Wayne by Leo XIII on July 15, 1893. Unlike his predecessor, Rademacher was known as a mild and approachable leader.

=== Death and legacy ===
Rademacher was disabled by a stroke in early 1899, and was admitted to St. Joseph Hospital in Fort Wayne, then to St. Elizabeth Hospital in Chicago. Joseph Rademacher died at St. Elizabeth's on June 12, 1900, at age 59.

Catholic Church titles
Preceded by Patrick Feehan	Bishop of Nashville; 1883–1893	Succeeded by Thomas Sebastian Byrne
