= Poor Handmaids of Jesus Christ =

Catholic institute of Religious Sisters

The Poor Handmaids of Jesus Christ (P.H.J.C.) (German: Arme Dienstmägde Jesu Christi) (A.D.J.C.) is a female congregation of the Catholic Church. It originated in Dernbach (Westerwald), Germany, where their international headquarters (generalate) is still located. Their organization for associates (like Fiat Spiritus) is also open to men. Their American Province has its motherhouse in Donaldson, Indiana.

== History ==
The founder of the Poor Handmaids was Maria Katharina Kasper (also known in English as Catherine Kasper) of Dernbach, Germany. She was beatified by Pope Paul VI on 16 April 1978. Pope Francis confirmed her canonization, which was celebrated on 14 October 2018 in Saint Peter's Square.

The official foundation date of the congregation is 15 August 1851. On this date Katharina Kasper took the vows of celibacy, obedience and poverty before the bishop of Limburg, Peter Joseph Blum. She was accompanied by four other women: Katharina Schoenberger, who took the religious name Theresia; Elisabeth Haas, who took the name Agnes; Anna Maria Mueller, who took the name Elisabeth; and Elisabeth Meuser, who took the name Klara. Since Dernbach did not yet have a church, the ceremony took place in the nearby village of Wirges. (The exact location, if church or vicarage, is a matter of debate between historians.)

The congregation grew rapidly, opening houses throughout Germany, the Netherlands, and England.

=== Stations in the Austro-Hungarian Empire and its successor states ===
The sisters founded eight stations in various towns in the Czech part of the Austro-Hungarian empire:

- Prague, a monastery (Kloster zum hl. Joseph; 01.06.1881 - 09.08.1945)
- Prague, an orphanage (Waisenhaus zum hl. Schutzengel; 13.09.1895 - 11.05.1945)
- Weipert, a poorhouse and old peoples' home (Armenhaus; 02.09.1896 - 13.07.1943)
- Weipert, a hospital (10.03.1909 - 18.11.1946)
- Bürgstein, a monastery (St. Johannes von Nepomuk; 16.10.1890 - 09.08.1945)
- Hirschberg, a monastery (St. Josephskloster; 10.07.1893 - 02.08.1945)
- Böhmisch-Kamnitz, the regional hospital (Bezirkskrankenhaus; 31.10.1895 - 27.11.1946)
- Türmitz, a monastery (Kloster Immakulata; 10.10.1887 - 01.08.1945)

None of these stations survived.

=== The stations in Great Britain ===
The sisters established three main stations in England. They were intended as a refuge, in case the Kulturkampf made such steps necessary. All were located in the diocese of Westminster:

- London (1876 - 1941)
- Walthamstow (1898 - 1940)
- the Convent of St Joseph, in Hendon (established 1882; school added by 1900)

The London and Walthamstow stations were destroyed in World War II.

=== In the United States ===
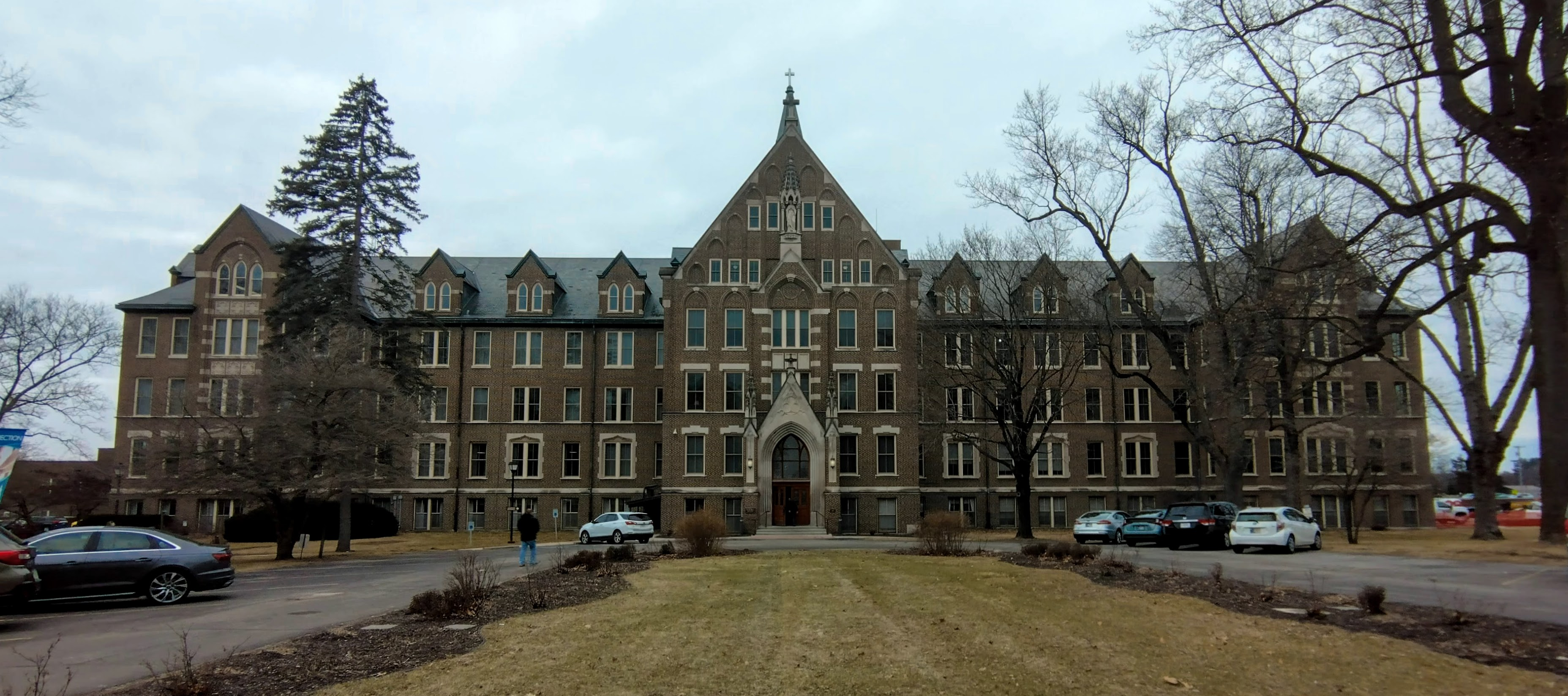
The American motherhouse in Donaldson, Indiana

In 1868, due to the large German-speaking population in the Diocese of Fort Wayne, Bishop John Henry Luers invited the sisters of Dernbach to come to the diocese. Luers himself was born in Münster (Germany). His family had emigrated when he was about thirteen. He became the first bishop of Fort Wayne (1848–1871).

On 8 August 1868 the first eight sisters left Dernbach (Prussia) to sail for the US from Le Havre, (France). Rosa Blum, the niece of the bishop of Blum, served as their superior. The other seven were Eudoxia Bender, Hyazintha Neuroth, Matrona Moehring, Facunda Wand, Bella Sienoecke, Henrica Sienoecke, and Corona Jahn. They were chosen out of 200 sisters who had volunteered to serve in the US. They boarded the ship on the 13th and reached New York on 24 August 1868. After a brief stay, they took the train to Fort Wayne, Indiana. From there, they took a horse-drawn cart to Hessen Cassel, Indiana. There they established their first mission on the feast of St. Rose, 30 August 1868. They nursed the sick, and looked after the parish church.

On 4 May 1869, St. Joseph Hospital became the first American hospital founded by the Poor Handmaids. It was located in the former Rockhill Hotel near Fort Wayne, and also served as the motherhouse of the order. They operated a school of nursing from 1918 to 1968, and operated the hospital until 1998, when it was sold. St. Joseph's is now a member of the Lutheran Health Network.

The first parochial school the sisters took charge of was that of St. Paul's in Fort Wayne, of which they took charge on 6 October 1869. They also engaged in private nursing, caring for the sick in their homes. St. Vincent's Orphan Asylum, also in Fort Wayne, came under their care in 1887. St. Roch's Sanatarium for consumption opened in 1899; Holy Family Hospital in La Porte, Indiana in 1900. They were also active in the dioceses of Belleville and Alton.

The sisters were introduced to the local community by Edward Koenig, pastor of St. Paul's Church at Fort Wayne. In due course, Koenig remained as an advisor with the sisters at their newly established motherhouse in Fort Wayne, serving as a liaison between the sisters and the bishop. He fulfilled this function for three consecutive bishops of the Fort Wayne diocese (John Henry Luers, Joseph Gregory Dwenger and Joseph Rademacher) until his death on 22 January 1898.

In October 1868, the vicar general of Chicago, Peter Fischer, asked for three sisters to serve in a German orphanage on the north side of Chicago. On 10 November 1868, they began their ministry at Angel Guardian Orphanage. The orphanage closed in 1978.

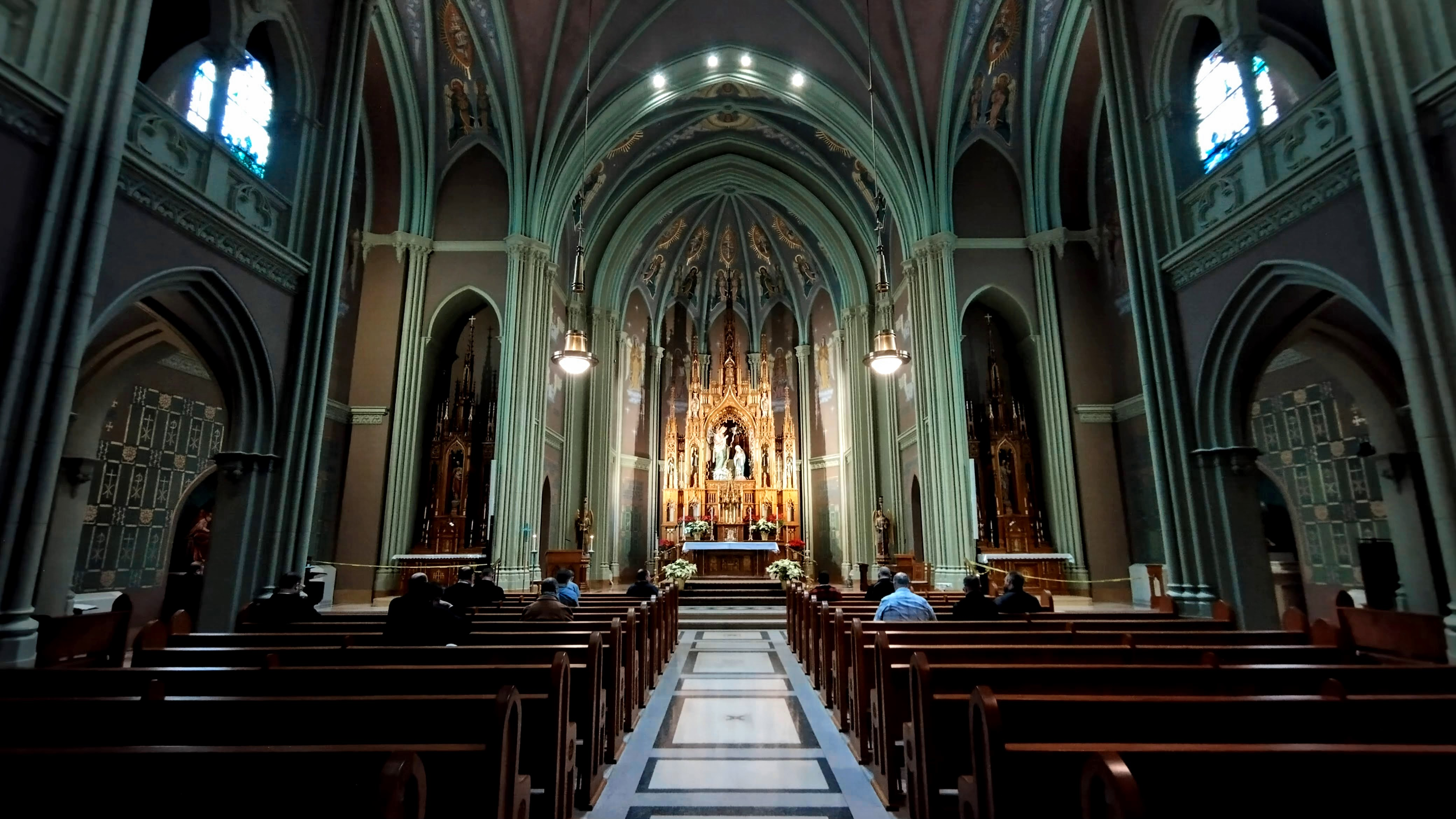
The chapel inside the Donaldson motherhouse

In the early 1920s, the motherhouse in America moved from Fort Wayne, Indiana to Donaldson. In 1937, the Poor Handmaids established Ancilla College as an extension of DePaul University to train candidates and novices. In 1966, Ancilla became a two-year private junior college. In 2021, Ancilla College merged into Marian University.

The American province is headquartered in Donaldson, Indiana.

== Present day ==
The Poor Handmaids of Jesus Christ is an international congregation of apostolic women religious within the Roman Catholic Church. They minister with the poor, the sick and children in Germany, the Netherlands (1859), United States (1868), England (1876), India (1970), Mexico (1988), Brazil (1993), Kenya (2000), and Nigeria (2006).

With prayer and community living as their foundation, they minister in rural, urban and inner city settings in the Midwest (USA). In Kenya, they run the St. Anne Mission hospital, which is sponsored by the Diocese of Meru.

The Notre Dame Archives is the repository for the Archives of the American Province of the Poor Handmaids of Jesus Christ.
