= Kaspar =

Male given name and family name

Kaspar is a given name and surname which may refer to:

Given name:

- Kaspar, Count Palatine of Zweibrücken (1459 – c. 1527)
- Kaspar Albrecht (1889–1970), Austrian architect and sculptor
- Kaspar Amort (1612–1675), German painter
- Caspar Aquila, sometimes spelled Kaspar, (1488–1560), German theologian and reformer
- Kaspar or Caspar Barlaeus (1584–1648), Dutch polymath, Renaissance humanist, theologian, poet and historian
- Kaspar Anton von Baroni-Cavalcabo (1682–1759), Italian painter
- Kaspar von Barth (1587–1658), German philologist and writer
- Kaspar Bausewein (1838–1903), German operatic bass
- Kaspar or Gáspár Bekes (1520–1579), Hungarian nobleman
- Kaspar Anton Karl van Beethoven (baptized 1774, died 1815), brother of composer Ludwig van Beethoven
- Kaspar Brandner (1916–1984), German World War II soldier awarded the Knight's Cross of the Iron Cross
- Kaspar Braun (1807–1877), German wood engraver
- Kaspar Brunner (died 1561), Swiss mechanic best known for his construction of the clockwork of the Zytglogge, Bern's medieval clock tower
- Gaspare Kaspar Capparoni (born 1964), Italian actor
- Kaspar Dalgas (born 1976), Danish footballer
- Kaspar Eberhard (1523–1575), German Lutheran theologian and teacher
- Kaspar Faber (1730–1784), German entrepreneur, founder of the stationery company Faber-Castell
- Kaspar Flütsch (born 1986), Swiss alpine snowboarder
- Kaspar Förster (baptized 1616, died 1673), German singer and composer
- Kaspar Füger (c. 1521 – after 1592), German Lutheran pastor and hymn writer
- Kaspar Fürstenau (1772–1819), German flautist and composer
- Kaspar Hauser (1812? – 1833), German youth who claimed to have grown up in total isolation in a darkened cell
- Kaspar or Caspar Hennenberger (1529–1600), German Lutheran pastor, historian and cartographer
- Kaspar Karsen (1810–1896), Dutch painter
- Kaspar Kokk (born 1982), Estonian cross-country skier
- Kaspar K. Kubli, Jr. (1869–1943), American politician
- Kaspar Kummer (1795–1870), German flautist, professor and composer
- Kaspar Laur (born 2000), Estonian footballer
- Kaspar Munk (born 1971), Danish film director
- Kaspar Oettli, Swiss orienteer who won a silver medal in the relay at the 1987 world championships
- Kaspar Röist (died 1527), Swiss papal official and commander of the papacy's Swiss Guard
- Kaspar Rostrup (1940–2025), Danish film director
- Kaspar Gottfried Schweizer (1816–1873), Swiss astronomer
- Kaspar or Caspar Schwenckfeld (1489 or 1490–1561), German theologian, writer and preacher
- Kaspar Maria von Sternberg (1761–1838), Bohemian theologian, mineralogist, geognost, entomologist and botanist
- Kaspar von Stieler (1632–1707), soldier-poet and linguist
- Kaspar or Kasper Straube, German 15th century printer
- Kaspar Taimsoo (born 1987), Estonian rower
- Kaspar Treier (born 1999), Estonian basketball player
- Kaspar Velberg (born 1989), Estonian actor
- Kaspar Ursinus Velius (c. 1493–1539), German humanist scholar, poet and historian
- Kaspar Villiger (born 1941), Swiss businessman and politician
- Kaspar Zehnder (born 1970), Swiss conductor and flautist
- Kaspar von Zumbusch (1830–1915), German sculptor

Surname:

- Danny Kaspar (born 1954), American college basketball head coach
- Felix Kaspar (1915–2003), Austrian figure skater and two-time world champion
- Mizzi Kaspar (1864–1907), mistress of Rudolf, Crown Prince of Austria
- Kašpar, a list of people with the Czech surname

== See also ==
- Casper (disambiguation)
- Kasper (given name), a list of people with the given name
- Kaspars, a Lithuanian given name, and a list of people with that name
- Azerbaijan Caspian Shipping Company, abbreviated as Kaspar
- Kašpárek
