= Joseph Dwenger =

American prelate

His Excellency, The Right Reverend Joseph Gregory Dwenger C.P.P.S.
- Bishop of Fort Wayne
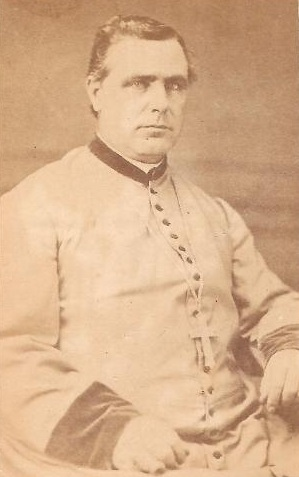
- Church: Roman Catholic Church
- See: Diocese of Fort Wayne
- In office: April 14, 1872 to January 22, 1893
- Predecessor: John Henry Luers
- Successor: Joseph Rademacher

Orders
- Ordination: September 4, 1859 by John Baptist Purcell
- Consecration: April 14, 1872 by John Baptist Purcell

Personal details
- Born: April 7, 1837 Minster, Ohio U.S.
- Died: January 22, 1893 (aged 55) Fort Wayne, Indiana, U.S.
- Buried: Cathedral of the Immaculate Conception, Fort Wayne
- Education: Athenaeum of Ohio

Styles of Joseph Gregory Dwenger
- Reference style: The Most Reverend
- Spoken style: Your Excellency
- Religious style: Monsignor

Joseph Gregory Dwenger, C.P.P.S (April 7, 1837 – January 22, 1893) was an American prelate of the Catholic Church. He served as bishop of Fort Wayne in Indiana from 1872 to 1893. He was a member of the Missionaries of the Precious Blood.

== Biography ==
=== Early life ===
Joseph Dwenger was born near Minster, Ohio, on April 7, 1837. His parents were Johann Gerhard Heinrich "Henry" Dwenger and Maria Catherine Wirdt. Dying of cholera, his widowed mother entrusted the boy to Reverend Andrew Kunkler, a priest of the Missionaries of the Precious Blood. The order raised Dwenger and educated him at Holy Trinity School in Cincinnati, Ohio He later joined the religious order, and was sent to study for the priesthood at Mount St. Mary's Seminary in Cincinnati.

=== Priesthood ===
Dwenger was ordained a priest for the Missionaries of the Precious Blood by Archbishop John Baptist Purcell on September 4, 1859. He had received a papal dispensation to receive ordination at age 22. In 1861, Dwenger arranged for the purchase of a property in Carthagena, Ohio that would become St. Charles Seminary, he was its founding rector. In 1862, the Missionaries assigned Dwenger to pastoral work. In 1867, he was sent on preaching missions in Ohio, Indiana and Kentucky. In 1872, Dwenger accompanied Purcell, as his theologian, to the Second Plenary Council of American bishops in Baltimore, Maryland.

=== Bishop of Fort Wayne ===
On February 15, 1872, Pope Pius IX appointed Dwenger as bishop of Fort Wayne. He was consecrated at the Cathedral of St. Peter in Chains in Cincinnati by Purcell on April 14, 1872, in Cincinnati. In 1874, Dwenger led the first pilgrimage of American bishops to Europe.

During his time in office he supported the congregation of the Poor Handmaids of Jesus Christ, as had his predecessor Bishop John Henry Luers. He allowed Father Edward Koenig – who had served as advisor to the sisters since their arrival – to remain in office in their Motherhouse in Fort Wayne. The good relationship continued, and in due course the congregation opened many schools, orphanages and hospitals in his and the neighboring dioceses. Especially the establishment of orphanages were at his core interest.

He served such parishes as Holy Rosary in St. Marys and St. Joseph's in Wapakoneta, both in Auglaize County, and he aided in establishing Immaculate Conception Parish in Celina, Ohio In 1875, he erected the St. Joseph orphan asylum for boys in Lafayette. He also created a trade school for boys in Lafayette. He was a zealous promoter of the parochial school system.

In 1884, Dwenger attended the Third Plenary Council at Baltimore, a meeting of the bishops of the United States. He spent seven months in Rome the following year, presenting the decrees of the plenary council to Pope Leo XIII for approval. Residing at the Pontifical North American College during his visit to Rome, he caused a stir by raising an American flag at the college on July 4th, American independence day.

In 1886, Dwenger erected an asylum for orphan girls at Fort Wayne. In 1888, while traveling again to Rome, Dwenger visited the motherhouse of the Poor Handmaids of Jesus Christ in Dernbach in the German Empire. He wanted to thank the sisters for their contributions to the diocese, including the work of the many sisters who had established schools and hospitals there. Dwenger took his final trip to Rome in 1891 to lobby support for the North American College.

=== Death and legacy ===
Joseph Dwenger died on January 22, 1893, in Fort Wayne. He was buried at the Cathedral of the Immaculate Conception in Fort Wayne. Bishop Dwenger High School in Fort Wayne is named for him.

Catholic Church titles
Preceded by John Henry Luers	Bishop of Fort Wayne; 1872–1893	Succeeded by Joseph Rademacher
