= Gasparini =

Gasparini is an Italian surname and may refer to:

- Francesco Gasparini (1668–1727), or simply "Gasparini," Italian composer
- Gaspare Gasparini (died 1590), Italian painter
- Graziano Gasparini (1924–2019), Venezuelan architect
- John Gasparini (fl. 1978–2009), former hockey coach and president of the United States Hockey League
- Marten Gasparini (born 1997), Italian baseball player
- Mitja Gasparini (born 1984), Slovenian volleyball player
- Quirino Gasparini (1721–1778), Italian composer
- Zulma Brandoni de Gasparini, Argentine palaeontologist

== See also ==
- Gasbarini, a minor planet
- Foucher-Gasparini, a French mechanical organ building company
- Gasparinisaura, a genus of dinosaur from the Late Cretaceous
