= Kasper =

Kasper may refer to:

- Kasper (surname), a list of people with the surname
- Kasper (given name), a list of people with the given name
- Käsper (surname), an Estonian surname
- Kasper (singer), Korean rapper
- Kasperle or Kasper, a traditional puppet character from Austria and Germany
- Michael Kasprowicz (born 1972), Australian cricketer nicknamed "Kasper"
- a division of Jones Apparel Group

== See also ==
- Casper (disambiguation)
- Kaspar
- Kašpar
