= Casper (given name) =

- Gender: Male

Origin
- Origin: Chaldean
- Meaning: "Treasurer"

Casper (with the same sounding Kasper) is a family and personal name derived from Aramaic that means "Treasurer". The origins of the name have been traced as far back as the Old Testament and variations of the name have been adopted by a variety of cultures and languages.

== Origins ==
The name is derived from Gaspar which in turn is from an ancient Chaldean word, "gizbar", which according to Strong's Concordance means "treasurer". The word "gizbar" appears in the Hebrew version of the Old Testament Book of Ezra (1:8). In fact, the modern Hebrew word for "treasurer" is still gizbar (גזבר). By the 1st century B.C. the Septuagint gave a Greek translation of "gizbar" in Ezra 1:8 as "gasbarinou" (literally, "son of Gasbar"). The transition from "Gizbar" to "Caspar" and "Kaspar" can thus be summarized as: Gizbar→Gasbar→Gaspar→Caspar→Kaspar... with "C" being a misreading of the manuscript "G" and "K" having the same phonetic value as "C".

There are numerous modern variations such as Gaspar (Catalan, Portuguese and Spanish), Gaspare (Italian), Gaspard (French), Kaspar (Dutch, German), Kašpar (Czech), Casper (Dutch, English), Caspar (Dutch), Kacper (Polish), Kasperi (Finnish), Kasper (Danish, Swedish), Gáspár (Hungarian), Гаспар (Russian) and Kaspars (Latvian).

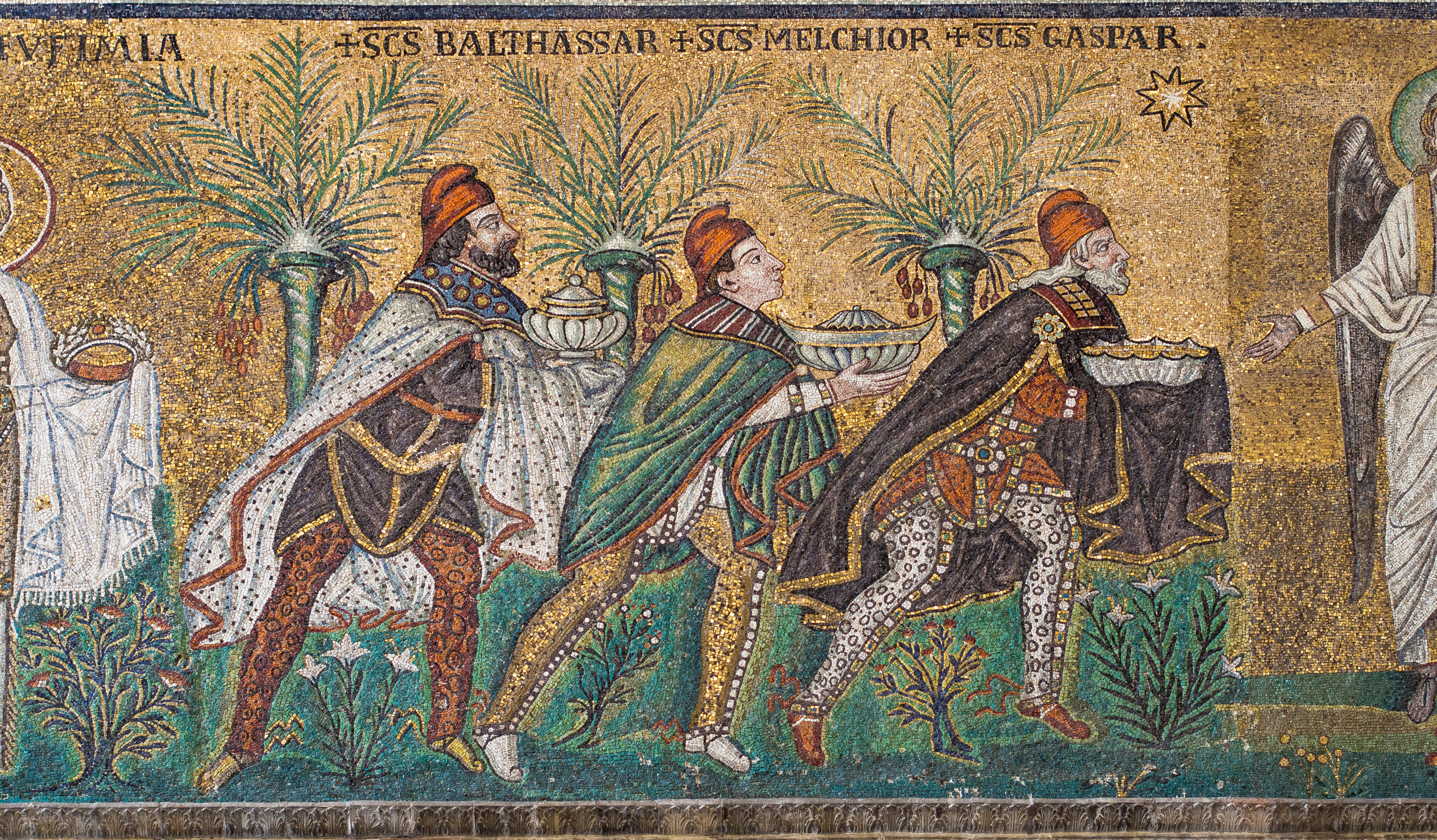
The Three Wise men in Basilica of Sant'Apollinare Nuovo, Ravenna (Italy)

By the 6th century, the name "Gaspar" was recorded in mosaic at the Basilica of Sant'Apollinare Nuovo in Ravenna, Italy as one of the traditional names assigned by folklore to the anonymous Magi mentioned in the Gospel of Matthew account of the Nativity of Jesus. The letter "G" in the name Gaspar was clearly different from the letter "C" used elsewhere, suggesting that the name Gaspar preceded the name Caspar, and not the other way around as some have supposed.

The Western tradition of the name Gaspar also derives from an early 6th century Greek manuscript, Gaspar

- Gosper
- Kaspar
- Kasper
- Kosper

== People ==
- Casper Ankergren (born 1979), Danish football goalkeeper
- Casper Asbjornson (1909–1970), American Major League Baseball catcher
- Casper ten Boom (1859–1944), Dutch watchmaker who aided Jews during the Holocaust
- Casper Christensen (born 1968), Danish comedian
- Casper Elgaard (born 1978), Danish auto racing driver
- Casper Helling (born 1972), Danish speedskater, particularly in longer distances
- Casper Henningsen (born 1985), Danish footballer
- Casper Holstein (1876–1944), New York City gangster
- Casper Janebrink (born 1970), Swedish singer, songwriter and musician
- Casper Jørgensen (born 1985), Danish racing cyclist
- Casper Ulrich Mortensen (born 1989), Danish handball player
- Casper Øyvann (born 1999), Norwegian footballer
- Casper Pedersen (born 1996), Danish cyclist
- Casper Reardon (1907–1941), classical and jazz harpist
- Casper Ruud (born 1998), Norwegian tennis player
- Casper Schoppen (born 2002), Dutch chess grandmaster
- Casper Sloth (born 1992), Danish footballer
- Casper Stornes (born 1997), Norwegian triathlete
- Casper R. Taylor, Jr. (1934–2023), American politician
- Casper Van Dien (born 1968), American actor
- Casper Ware (born 1990), American basketball player
- Casper Wells (born 1984), Major League Baseball player
- Casper Winther (born 2003), Danish footballer
- Casper Wollenhaupt (1755–1809), merchant and politician in Nova Scotia (now part of Canada)
- Casper Yost (1863–1941), longtime editor of the St. Louis Globe-Democrat newspaper

== See also ==
- Casper (surname)
- Caspar David Friedrich (born 1774), German Romantic painter
- Casper the Friendly Ghost
