= Maria Katharina Kasper =

German foundress and saint (1820–1898)

Saint Mary Catherine Kasper, A.D.J.C.
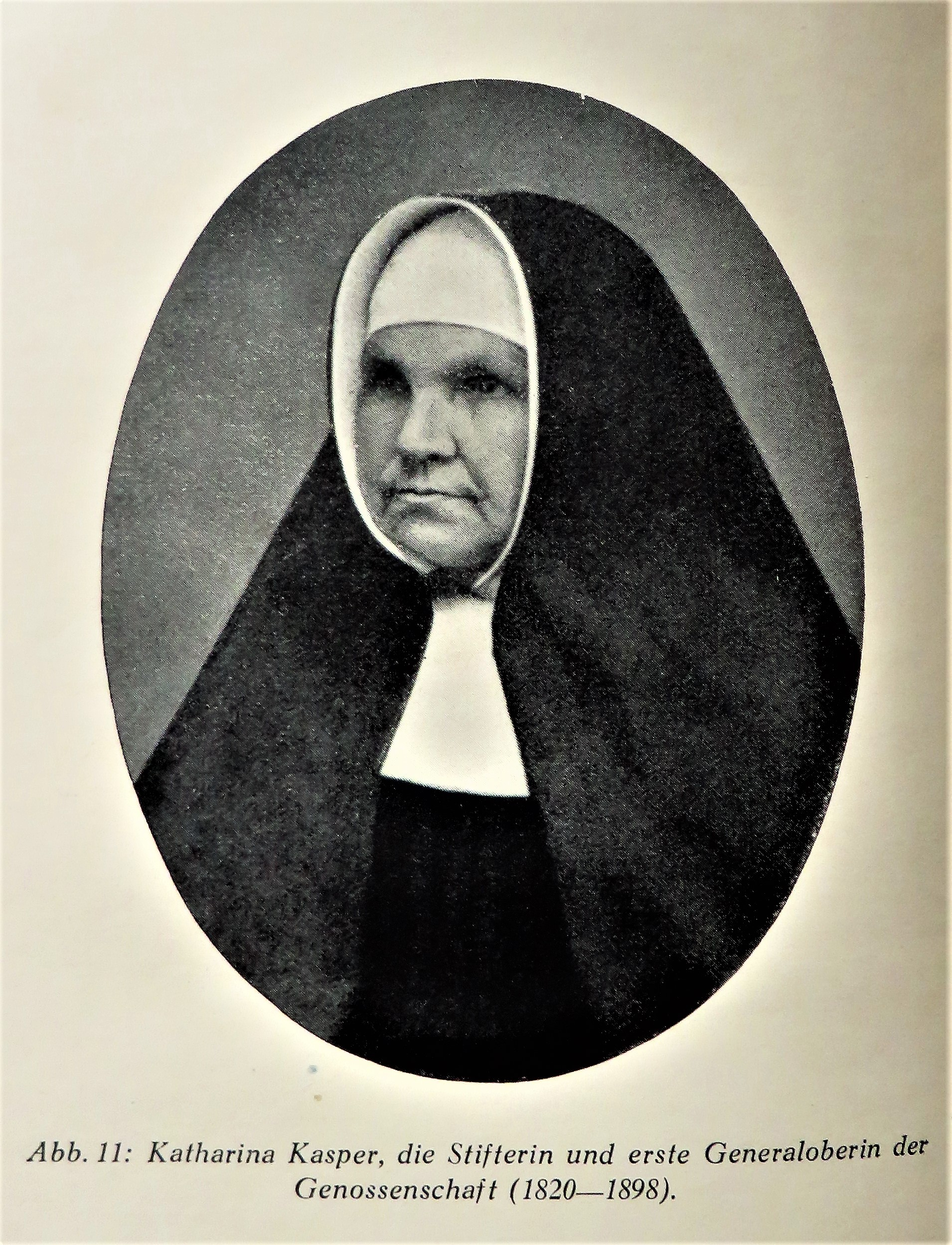

Virgin and foundress
- Born: Katharina Kasper; 26 May 1820; Dernbach, Amt Montabaur, Duchy of Nassau, German Confederation
- Died: 2 February 1898 (aged 77); Dernbach, Unterwesterwaldkreis, Prussia, German Empire
- Resting place: Motherhouse Church, Dernbach, Westerwald, Germany
- Venerated in: Catholic Church (Poor Handmaids of Jesus Christ)
- Beatified: 16 April 1978, Saint Peter's Square, Vatican City, by Pope Paul VI
- Canonized: 14 October 2018, Saint Peter's Square, Vatican City, by Pope Francis
- Feast: 2 February
- Attributes: Religious habit; Crucifix

Mary Catherine Kasper, A.D.J.C. (German: Maria Katharina Kasper) (born Katharina Kasper; 26 May 1820 – 2 February 1898) was a German Catholic Religious Sister and the foundress of the Poor Handmaids of Jesus Christ. Kasper entered the religious life later in her life despite having harbored a desire to become a religious sister for a very long time. It did not materialize earlier due to aggravating circumstances such as Kasper's poor economic status and the deaths of both her father and her brother. Moreover, due to the secularization under Napoleon, no female religious orders existed in her region. Her dedication to the poor and the will was noted during the course of her life and she dedicated herself to this work with great zeal.

Kasper's canonization process launched in the 1940s and on 4 October 1974 the investigations into her cause were accepted by the Holy See for further study and she was granted the title of Venerable; Pope Paul VI beatified her not long after on 16 April 1978. Pope Francis confirmed her canonization which was celebrated on 14 October 2018.

== Early life ==
Maria Katharina Kasper was born on 26 May 1820 in Dernbach (now part of the state of Rhineland-Palatinate in western Germany) as the third of four children to the devout peasants Heinrich Kasper (Dernbach, 30/12/1773 - Dernbach, 26/01/1842) and Katharina Fassel (Bilkheim 14/12/1785- Dernbach, 20/03/1848). Her father had four daughters from his first marriage with Anna Margaretha Hannappel (1776 - Dernbach, 23/10/1814). Her siblings were Peter, Christian and Joseph.

In her childhood she liked to read and placed a particular emphasis on the Bible and The Imitation of Christ. Kasper attended school in her hometown (from age six to fourteen though frail health often kept her at home) and helped in her parents' potato patch while also doing household chores such as spinning and weaving. To the children she sang songs and often told them stories.

Kasper also worked in the fields and one such job she was entrusted with was the splitting of stones for road construction in the areas around the field. Kasper often traveled to a Marian shrine and took fellow children there too. At an early age resolved to consecrate her life to God. During adolescence Kasper worked in the fields to support her parents, while her vision of a vocation grew clearer as she worked.

On January 26th 1842 her father died and in the same year one of her brothers died whilst on his way back from trading in the Netherlands; their deaths splintered the household. Her step-sisters received her father's estate. She and her mother were forced to leave their home; Their poor economic condition aggravated the situation. They rented a room at the home of Matthias Müller and she did weaving for a meager living to support herself and her mother. Her mother died sometime after this which left Kasper alone but free to pursue her call to the religious life.

== Career ==
She wanted to become a nun but not in a pre-existing religious congregation. She wished to combine the contemplative spirit of Mary with and active life of Martha in the service of God. This would have meant leaving her home region, as there were no women's religious orders present due to secularization. Yet there were still (male) members of these orders (from formerly existing monasteries) living in her area, e.g., Franciscans and Cistercians in nearby Montabaur. Due to their presence and also their ongoing religious activities their spirit lived on. Kasper encountered this not only in Montabaur but also during her stay in Limburg. With the help of other locals and family, she built her own little house in Dernbach which became the first house of the community. The first local girls, who helped her to nurse children and the sick in the village, lived at their respective family homes.

The activities of her group did not go unseen, particularly as their activities grew. The local mayor made a public announcement about the group, gave them some guidelines, and asked the villagers to make donations to them. Also the priests from neighbouring Wirges and Montabaur were informed. They probably passed the information to Peter Joseph Blum the Bishop of Limburg, who Kasper also visited. In time, some of the girls from the village moved into Kasper's house, and also women from other villages. What began in 1845/46 as a dedicated but loose circle, now needed larger premises. It also became an association dedicated to entering organized religious life and would form the basis for the religious congregation that Kasper would create.

== Poor Handmaids of Jesus Christ order ==
On 15 August 1851 Bishop Blum received the first vows of the group in Wirges church. The Poor Handmaids of Jesus Christ were established and Kasper (and the other women) were professed as religious. Kasper took the religious name "Maria". The congregation spread at a rapid pace and Kasper visited the various homes that spread to see how each functioned and how each was performing its mission; the congregation soon crossed to the Netherlands in 1859. Kasper served five consecutive terms as the order's Superior General. In 1854 the order opened its first school. Pope Pius IX granted a decree of praise for the order on 9 March 1860 but it first received formal papal approval from Pope Leo XIII on 21 May 1890. In the aftermath of the Civil War, John Henry Luers, the bishop of Fort Wayne, Indiana wrote to Mother Maria, petitioning her to send sisters to Fort Wayne to minister to the German immigrants who had settled there.

== Death ==
Kasper suffered a heart attack on 27 January 1898 and died in Dernbach motherhouse at dawn of the Feast of the Presentation (2 February 1898). She was buried at the sisters' private cemetery near to the motherhouse. Her remains were transferred to the order's motherhouse chapel in 1950. From their first placing in a vault they were due to the beatification (1978) transferred into a shrine-casket placed underneath the altar.

== Legacy ==
Her order now operates, besides Germany in countries across the world such as Brazil, Great Britain, India, Kenya, Netherland, Nigeria and Mexico. At her death in 1898, there were 1725 religious in 193 houses, but in 2008 they numbered 690 religious in 104 houses. The United States Motherhouse for the PHJC's is in Donaldson (Plymouth), Indiana.

== Canonization ==
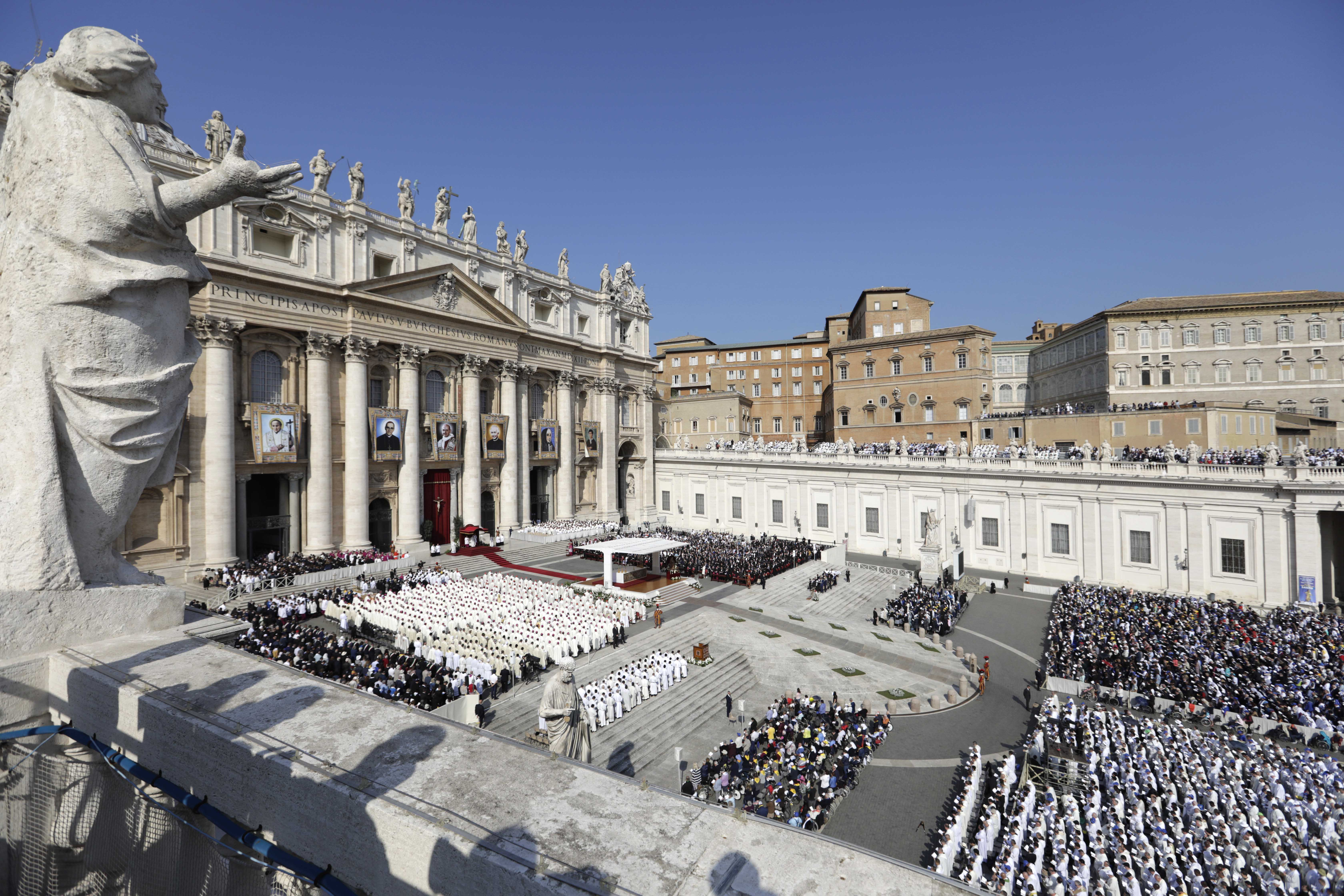
Kasper's canonization in 2018.

The beatification process began in Limburg in an informative process that opened in 1928 and was closed less than a decade later in 1935. Kasper's spiritual writings were approved by theologians on 27 November 1937. The formal introduction to the cause came on 3 February 1946 under Pope Pius XII and Kasper became titled as a Servant of God. The first step forward was a committee approving the cause on 3 May 1966, while the Congregation for the Causes of Saints and their consultants likewise confirmed their approval for the cause on 9 April 1974. The C.C.S. granted additional approval to the cause on 4 June 1974. Kasper became titled as Venerable on 4 October 1974 after Pope Paul VI – in an audience with the C.C.S. prefect Cardinal Luigi Raimondi – confirmed that Kasper had lived a life of heroic virtue and authorized the promulgation of a decree confirming this move.

Her beatification then depended upon the papal confirmation of a miracle that science and medicine fail to explain. The miracle leading to her beatification was the healing of the sister Maria Herluka – of Kasper's order – from severe tuberculosis in September 1945. The miracle was investigated on 3 December 1968 until its closure on 29 May 1970, and the C.C.S. validated the process on 24 October 1974. Medical experts confirmed the healing had no possible explanation at their meeting held on 16 July 1975 while the C.C.S. and their theological consultants on 30 November 1976 determined the healing came as a direct result of Kasper's intercession. The C.C.S. alone – also on 30 November – provided additional confirmation. This later culminated on 20 January 1977 when Paul VI confirmed the healing as a miracle which would allow for Kasper to be beatified.

Paul VI beatified Kasper in April 1978 in Saint Peter's Square.

Pope Francis confirmed her canonization which was celebrated in Saint Peter's Square on 14 October 2018. The miracle that allowed for her canonization took place in India in 2012.

On 20 October 2019 the Bishop of Limburg Georg Bätzing blessed a bell which was donated from Limburgian family dedicated to the new saint. This bell ('c') will complete the bells of Limburger Dom. Commissioned in 2019 by the Diocese of Limburg, Johannes Schröder composed an oratorio Beati Pauperes. Selig, die arm sind vor Gott (Blessed the poor), commemorating her on the anniversary of her canonization.
