= Gasparro (surname) =

Gasparro is an Italian surname. Notable people with the surname include:

- Frank Gasparro (1909–2001), American engraver
- Vince Gasparro, Canadian politician

== See also ==
- Gaspare, given name
