= St. Joseph Hospital (Fort Wayne, Indiana) =

Hospital in Fort Wayne, Indiana, US (1861–2021)

Coordinates: 41°4′40.3″N 85°8′57″W

- Lutheran Health Network

Geography
- Location: 700 Broadway, Fort Wayne, Indiana, United States

Organization
- Care system: Public
- Type: Community

Services
- Beds: 191

History
- Founded: 1869
- Closed: 2021

Links
- Website: www.stjoehospital.com
- Lists: Hospitals in Indiana

St. Joseph Hospital, known commonly as "St. Joe," was the first hospital founded in Fort Wayne, Indiana, United States, opening in 1869. St. Joseph's was sold in 1998, and continued to operate under Lutheran Health Network (a subsidiary of CHS) until 2021 when staff and equipment were transferred to the newly opened Lutheran Downtown Hospital. "Old St. Joe's" was demolished in 2022.

Proceeds from the sale went to establish St. Joseph Community Health Foundation which provides financial support to healthcare programs in the Fort Wayne area.

== History ==
Rockhill House Hotel was built in 1838 by William Rockhill, as a luxury hotel. Rockhill died in 1865 and the hotel closed two years later. The need for a hospital in Fort Wayne became clear when a smallpox epidemic struck the town in 1865. Bishop John Luers of the Diocese of Fort Wayne offered to buy the abandoned Rockhill House for a hospital if the county and the city would contribute to the necessary repairs and outfitting the building for hospital purposes. The mayor and the county commissioners saddled with debt, declined. Luers bought the property and formed the St. Joseph's Benevolent Association to raise money to renovate the 65-room former hotel and open a hospital. In 1868, due to the large German-speaking population in the diocese, Bishop John Luers invited the Poor Handmaids of Jesus Christ (PHJC) of Dernbach / Westerwald, a German religious order, to come to the diocese to staff the hospital. St. Joe's also served as the motherhouse of the congregation until it moved to Donaldson, Indiana in the 1920s.

In 1870, "the hospital initiated a program that enabled all poor residents of Allen County to be treated there rather than being placed in the 'poorhouse', as was the custom. For this service, the city and township trustees paid the hospital $3 per week for each patient."

Over the years St Joseph Hospital developed into a 9-story facility with over 400 beds, providing care to thousands each year. The facility was once known for the St. Joseph Regional Burn center that was the only one of its kind in Northeast Indiana. In 1918 St. Joseph School of Nursing opened across the street from the hospital. Student nurses attended the three-year program during the day, and worked at the hospital in the evenings.

The Poor Handmaids owned and operated St. Joseph Hospital until the 1998 when they sold the hospital to Quorum Health Group. The proceeds from the sale went to the St. Joseph Community Health Foundation. The foundation funds organizations such as "Matthew 25", a nonprofit, healthcare center located in Fort Wayne, Indiana serving the underinsured, the poor, and homeless.

St. Joseph Hospital closed at 5:59 a.m. on November 13, 2021, after staff and patients were transferred to the newly completed Lutheran Downtown Hospital at the corner of Van Buren and Main Streets.

In May 2022 old St. Joe's caught fire, sparked by contractors working to demolish the building which is currently undergoing demolition as the new Lutheran Downtown Hospital opened up across the street off of Van Buren Street.

Lutheran Downtown Hospital is a member of the Lutheran Health Network, a subsidiary of Community Health Systems.

== Services ==
- Behavioral Health
- Intensive Care Unit
- Cardiac and Vascular Services
- ER
- Hyperbaric Medicine
- Inpatient and Outpatient Surgery
- Lake Avenue Outpatient Center
- Lutheran Health Network Diabetes Services
- Nationally Verified Burn Center(Lost accreditation in July 2018)
- Orthopaedic Center
- Pain Management Center
- Radiology and Lab Services
- Rehabilitation
- Senior Circle Program
- Senior Health Services
- Sleep Disorders Center
- Transitional Care Unit
- Wound Care Center
- Anthony Medical Center
