= Kaspars =

Male given name

- Gender: Male

Origin
- Region of origin: Latvia

Kaspars is a Latvian masculine given name. It is a cognate to the German name Kaspar and English name Casper and may refer to:

- Kaspars Astašenko (born 1975), Latvian ice hockey player
- Kaspars Bērziņš (born 1985), Latvian basketball player
- Kaspars Cipruss (born 1982), Latvian basketball player
- Kaspars Daugaviņš (born 1988), Latvian ice hockey player
- Kaspars Dubra (born 1990), Latvian football defender
- Kaspars Dumpis (born 1982), Latvian luger and Olympic competitor
- Kaspars Dumbris (born 1985), Latvian biathlete
- Kaspars Gerhards (1969), Latvian politician
- Kaspars Gorkšs (born 1981), Latvian footballer
- Kaspars Ikstens (born 1988), Latvian footballer
- Kaspars Kambala (born 1978), Latvian basketball player
- Kaspars Liepiņš (born 1984), Latvian sidecarcross rider
- Kaspars Ozers (born 1968), Latvian cyclist
- Kaspars Petrovs (born 1978), Latvian convicted serial killer
- Kaspars Saulietis (born 1987), Latvian ice hockey player
- Kaspars Stupelis (born 1982), Latvian sidecarcross passenger
- Kaspars Vecvagars (born 1993), Latvian basketball player
- Kaspars Znotiņš (born 1975), Latvian stage and film actor
