= Caspar (disambiguation) =

Caspar is a masculine given name.

Caspar may also refer to:

- Caspar, California, a census-designated place
- Fort Caspar, Wyoming, a former US Army military post on the National Register of Historic Places
- CASPAR digital preservation project
- Azerbaijan Caspian Shipping Company, abbreviated as Caspar

== See also ==
- Caspar-Werke, a defunct German aircraft manufacturer
- Casper (disambiguation)
