= Kašpar =

Kašpar is a Czech surname. It may refer to:

- Adolf Kašpar (1877-1934), Czech painter and illustrator
- Jan Kašpar (1883-1927), Czech aviator, designer and engineer
- Jonáš Kašpar, Czech slalom canoeist who has competed since the late 2000s
- Lukáš Kašpar (born 1985), Czech ice hockey player
- Karel Kašpar (1870-1941), Czech Catholic cardinal
- Petr Kašpar (born 1960), Czech retired footballer and current director general of Slovak football club Slovan Bratislava
- Kašpar Mašek, Czech-Slovenian composer

== See also ==
- Kasper (disambiguation)
- Casper (disambiguation)
