= Antonín Kasper =

Antonín Kasper may refer to:

- Antonín Kasper Sr. (1932–2017), Czech speedway rider, Speedway World Team Cup medallist
- Antonín Kasper Jr. (1962–2006), his son, Czech speedway rider, 1982 Individual U-21 World Champion
