= Leopoldine Kasparek =

Austrian serial killer (1893–1921)

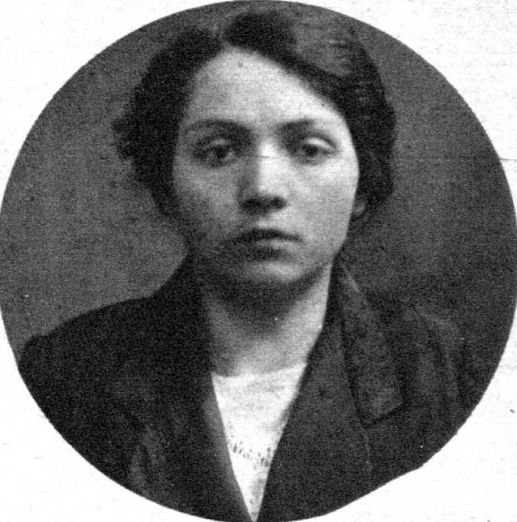
- Undated photograph of Kasparek
- Born: c. 1893
- Died: 1921 (aged 27–28)
- Other names: "The Strangler of Vienna" "The Strangling Angel"
- Status: Deceased
- Conviction: Murder
- Penalty: Death; commuted to life imprisonment

Details
- Span of crimes: 1915–1916
- Country: Austria
- State: Vienna
- Target: Wealthy elderly women
- Killed: 4
- Injured: 11
- Date apprehended: September 1916

Leopoldine Kasparek (1893–1921), also known as The Strangler of Vienna, was an Austrian serial killer, arsonist, and thief who attacked 14 wealthy, elderly women in Vienna, Austria, killing four. After gaining enough trust to be let into their homes, Kasparek strangled her victims until they were dead or unconscious before ransacking their homes. Initially sentenced to death for her crimes, her sentence was later commuted to life imprisonment. She remained imprisoned until her death in 1921.

== Murders ==
Between 1915 and 1916, Kasparek committed a series of assaults and murders on wealthy elderly women. Ten of her victims recovered from their injuries, three died immediately, and one died from her wounds in the hospital. After Krasparek's victims allowed her into their homes, she strangled them until they were either dead or unconscious. She then ransacked every room in their homes, stealing anything of value.

Kasparek murdered her first victim in 1915. Her second victim was 56-year-old Marie Wurisch, a partially blind woman. After strangling Wurisch unconscious, Kasparek coated her in paraffin wax – a flammable substance – and lit her on fire. When her charred body was discovered, it was initially believed that her death had been accidental. However, investigators reclassified it as a homicide after noticing ligature marks around her neck. On 21 August 1916, Kasparek strangled 80-year-old Zäilie Höstschul to death. On 10 September 1916, she fatally strangled her final victim, 72-year-old Stefanie von Mack.

Between the murders, Kasparek was arrested several times for thefts, robberies, and acts of extortion. She received short prison sentences for these crimes. The murders remained unsolved for several months until investigators connected her to Wurisch's murder in September 1916. Kasparek was subsequently arrested.

== Legal proceedings ==
Following her arrest, Kasparek swallowed a large darning needle, which had to be removed by surgery at a hospital. As soon as she was well enough, she strangled an elderly nurse unconscious and escaped from the hospital. However, she was captured within 30 minutes.

At her trial, Kasparek was cynical and unremorseful. She bragged about the crimes she committed and cursed the judges and the jurors. After she had been given a death sentence, it took six policemen to drag her out of the courtroom and put her back in her prison cell. Her sentence was later commuted to life imprisonment.

In 1921, Kasparek died at the Neudorf penitentiary.

== See also ==
- List of serial killers by country
- List of serial killers by number of victims
