= Casper Schoppen =

Dutch chess grandmaster (born 2002)

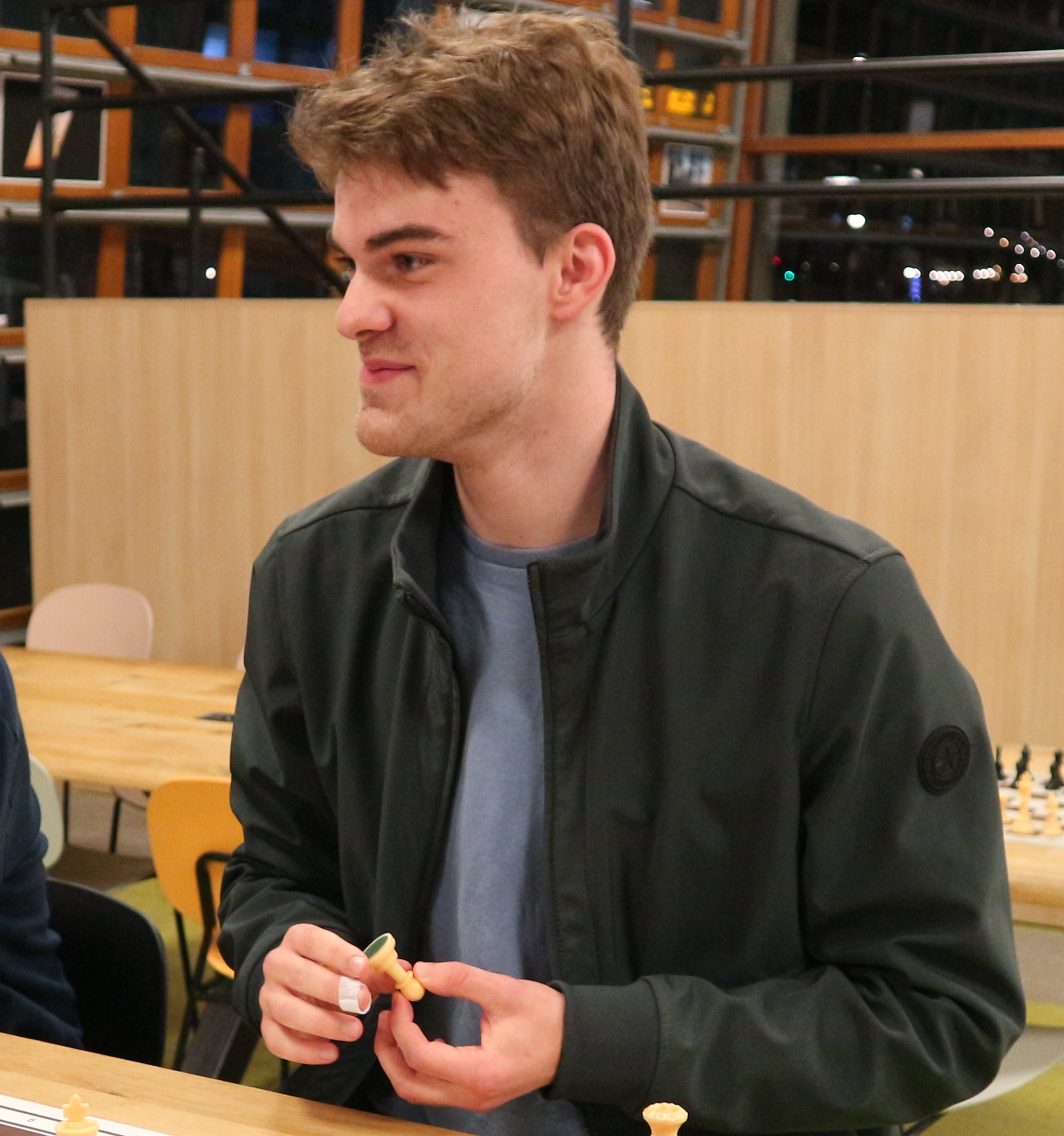
- Schoppen in 2023

Personal information
- Born: March 21, 2002 (age 24) Utrecht, Netherlands

Chess career
- Country: Netherlands
- Title: Grandmaster (2020)
- FIDE rating: 2582 (September 2026)
- Peak rating: 2589 (May 2026)

Casper Schoppen is a Dutch chess grandmaster.

== Chess career ==
In May 2019, he achieved a world record in "Puzzle Rush" on Chess.com, with a score of 70.

In February 2020, he won the Open section of the Daniël Noteboom Memorial Tournament in Leiden.

In September 2020, he took part in European Online Youth Chess Championship in Open 18 group. He came second, with a score of 7/9 behind Andrey Esipenko.

In July 2023, Schoppen played and won III Open Internacional CA MONTEOLIVETE in Valencia on better tiebreaks, scoring 7,5/9.

In December 2023, he played in the European Rapid & Blitz Chess Championships. He was tied for first place going into the final round, but lost his game against eventual winner Alexey Sarana. He finished 4th overall in the championship.

In June 2025, Schoppen won the IM/GM round robin, organized as part of the 17th BPB Limburg Open.

In October 2025, he won Open Hvar with the score of 8/9.

In December/January 2025/26, Schoppen came first in XXXVI Międzynarodowy Festiwal Szachowy CRACOVIA 2025 after winning his last round and finishing half a point ahead of his competitors.
