= Gasparri =

Gasparri is a surname of Italian origin. Notable people with the name include:

- Andrea Gasparri (born 1989), Italian footballer
- Enrico Gasparri (1871–1946), Italian cardinal
- Franco Gasparri (1948–1999), Italian actor
- Maurizio Gasparri (born 1956), Italian politician
- Pietro Gasparri (1852–1934), Italian cardinal
