= Marten Gasparini =

Italian baseball player

- Shortstop
- Born: May 24, 1997 (age 28); Ruda, Italy
- Bats: Switch Throws: Right
- Stats at Baseball Reference

Marten Gasparini (born May 24, 1997) is an Italian former professional baseball shortstop who played in the Kansas City Royals organization his entire minor league career. Gasparini received a $1.3 million signing bonus from the Royals, a record bonus for a European player. On May 18, 2019, Gasparini announced his retirement from professional baseball after 6 seasons in the Kansas City Royals organization.

== Early life ==
Gasparini was raised in the town of Ruda, Friuli, the son of an Italian father (Federico) and a British mother (Wendy). His mother, a former track and field athlete, taught English in Italy, using American movies with Italian subtitles to help her students learn the language. One such film was For Love of the Game, which piqued Gasparini's interest in baseball. He also participated in soccer and martial arts.

While competing in Little League Baseball at the age of 11, Gasparini caught the attention of scouts. He then attended the Italian Baseball Academy in Tirrenia beginning in 2011. In 2012, Gasparini competed for the Italian national baseball team in the 15-and-under and 18-and-under Baseball World Championships.

== Career ==
At the age of 16, Gasparini signed with the Royals as an international free agent for a signing bonus of US$1.3 million in 2013, the largest bonus given to a European player. That fall, he participated in the Arizona Instructional League. Gasparini made his professional debut in 2014 with the Burlington Royals of the rookie-level Appalachian League. He had a .191 batting average in 19 games played for Burlington, and also played four games for the Idaho Falls Chukars of the rookie-level Pioneer League.

Gasparini spent the 2015 season with Idaho Falls, where he had a .259 batting average, 26 stolen bases, and led the league in triples with 10. He played the 2016 season with the Lexington Legends of the Class A South Atlantic League, posting a .196 batting average with seven home runs and 42 RBIs. He returned to Lexington in 2017, batting .227 with nine home runs and 50 RBIs in 122 games.

== Personal life ==
Gasparini has a sister, who is studying in the United States.
