= Gaspare Gasparini =

Italian painter

Gaspare Gasparini (died 30 September 1590) was a native of Macerata. He was a disciple of Girolamo Siciolante da Sermoneta, whose style he followed, though in a less finished manner; as appears in his two pictures in the church of San Venanzio at Fabriano, representing The Baptism of Christ and The Last Supper. He is seen to more advantage in his picture of St. Peter and St. John curing the Lame Man, in the same church, a grand composition, in which he seems to have imitated the style of Raphael. In the church of the Conventuali, in his native place, there is a fine picture of St. Francis receiving the Stigmata.
