= Debbie Kasper =

American comedian

Debbie Kasper is a stand-up comedian and writer. She was nominated for a Daytime Emmy Award for her work on The Rosie O'Donnell Show. She also wrote for Roseanne during the ninth season of the show.

Kasper's one woman show "Without ME My Show IS Nothing" received the DramaLogue award for best one person show in Los Angeles. She co-wrote and co-stars in "Self-Help: The Comedy" and tours in the show.
