= Julia Kasper =

New Zealand entomologist

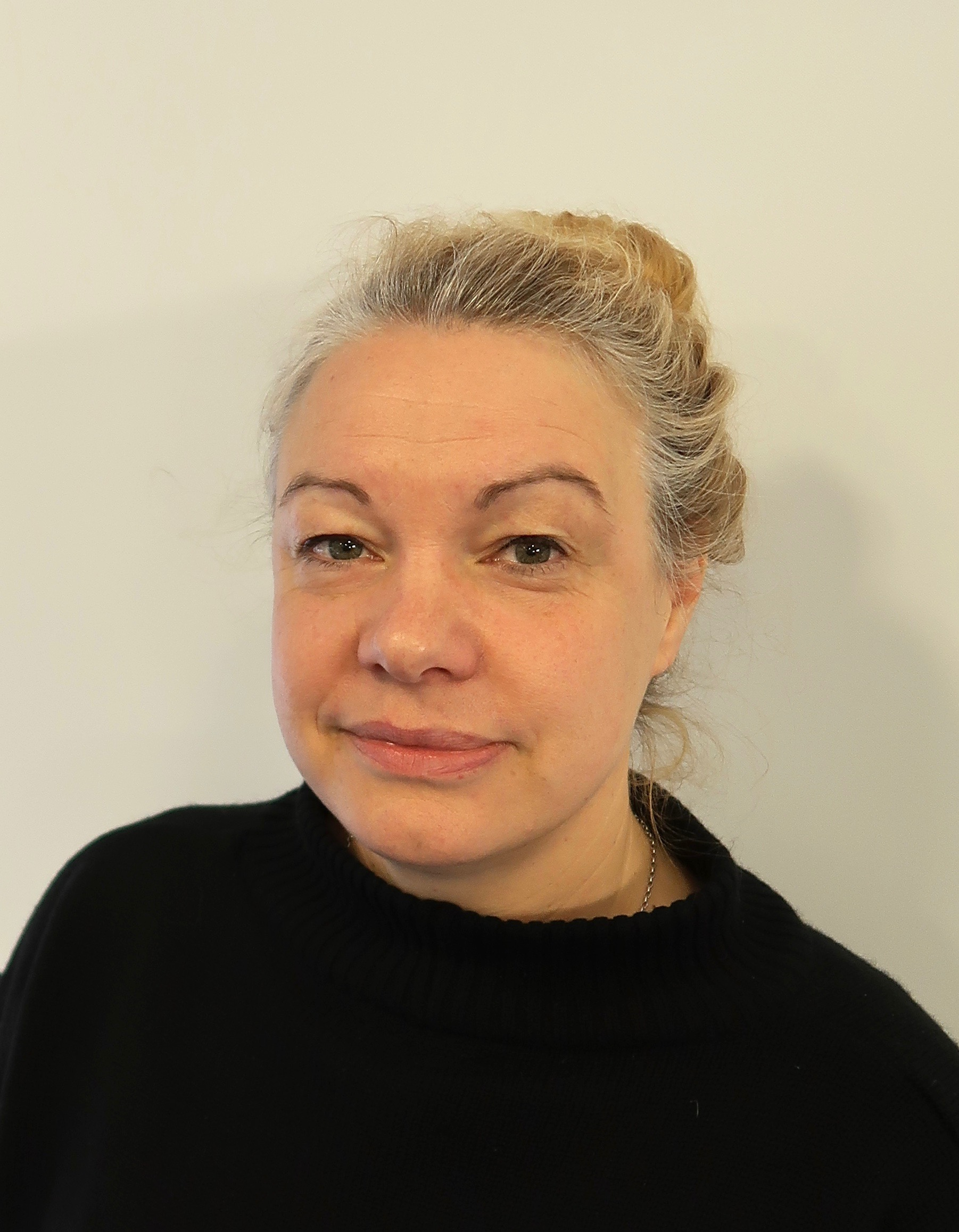
- Kasper in 2019
- Born: Julia Kasper
- Scientific career
- Fields: Entomology, taxonomy
- Institutions: Te Papa
- Thesis: Examinations of decomposition-processes and the olfactory sense of the necrophagous fly Lucilia caesar (L.) (Diptera: Calliphoridae) in relationship to the fly’s physiological state (2013)
- Author abbrev. (zoology): Kasper

Julia Kasper is a New Zealand entomologist specialising in Diptera. As of 2022, she is the lead invertebrate curator at New Zealand's national museum, Te Papa. As part of her work Kasper is assisting with a citizen science project informing a national mosquito census. Kasper previously worked as the principal entomologist at the New Zealand Biosecure Laboratory. She has also undertaken work in forensic entomology assisting the New Zealand police and coroners with cases. Prior to living in New Zealand, she worked at the Natural History Museum in Berlin. Kasper obtained her doctorate at Humboldt University of Berlin in 2013.

She is a member of the New Zealand Entomological Society and, as of 2022, serves as the President of its Wellington branch.

== Works ==
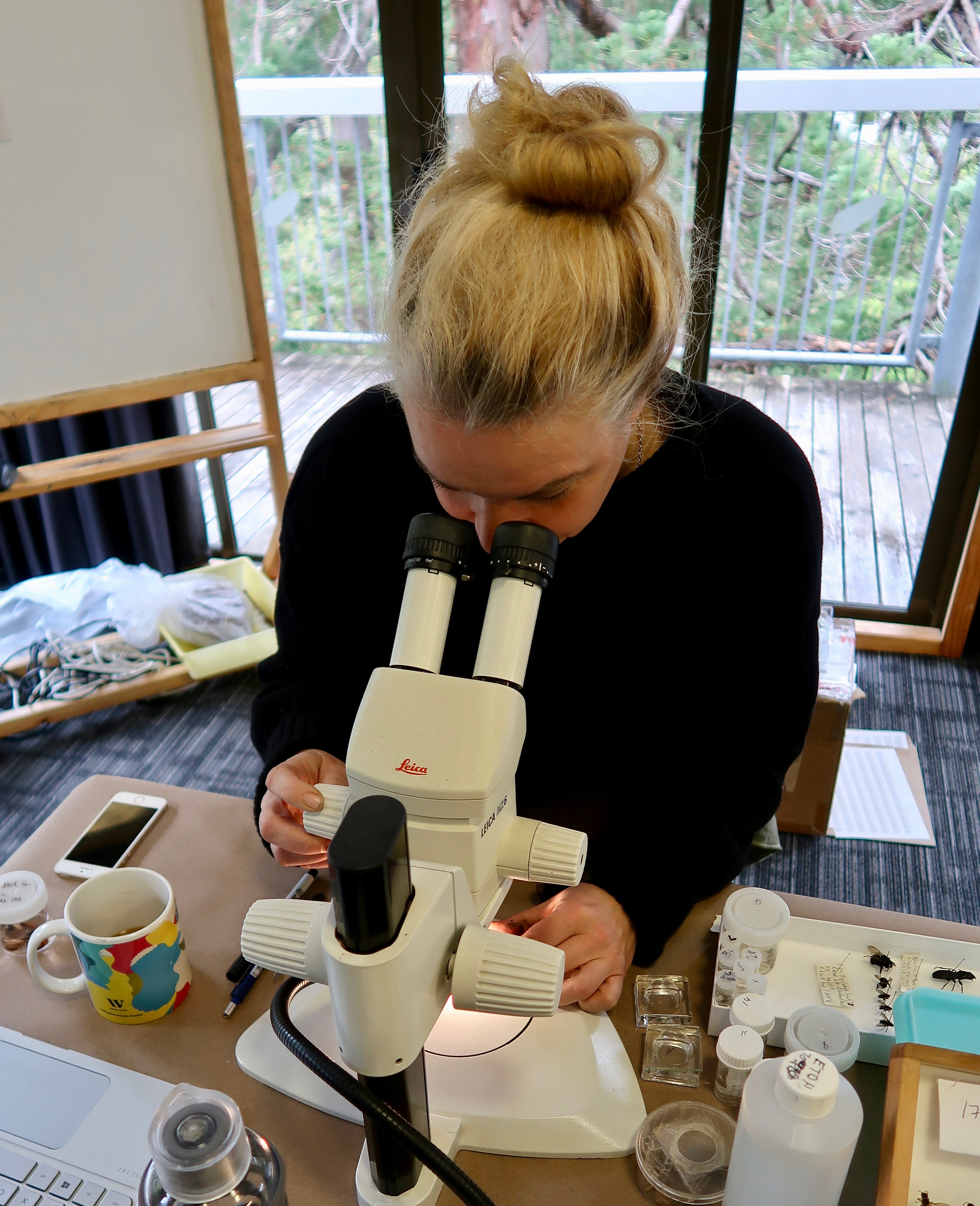
Kasper participating in a bioblitz.

Some publications by Kasper include:

- Julia Kasper; Roland Mumm; Joachim Ruther (27 August 2012). "The composition of carcass volatile profiles in relation to storage time and climate conditions". Forensic Science International. 223 (1–3): 64–71. doi:10.1016/J.FORSCIINT.2012.08.001. ISSN 0379-0738. PMID 22951222. Wikidata Q34404223.
- Julia Kasper (7 December 2020). "Description of a new species of mosquito, Aedes (Ochlerotatus) arundinariae (Diptera: Culicidae) from the Chatham Islands, New Zealand". New Zealand Entomologist. 43 (2): 93–102. doi:10.1080/00779962.2020.1846988. ISSN 0077-9962. Wikidata Q104800563.
- Sirvid, Phil; Kasper, Julia (2020). My little book of bugs = Taku pukapuka iti mō ngā pepeke. Stephanie Tibble, Jean-Claude Stahl. Wellington, New Zealand: Te Papa Press. ISBN 978-0-9951338-7-7. OCLC 1179162127.
- Rodrigo B. Salvador; Barbara M. Tomotani; Katrin L. O’Donnell; Daniel C. Cavallari; João V. Tomotani; Rhian A. Salmon; Julia Kasper (9 March 2021). "Invertebrates in Science Communication: Confronting Scientists' Practices and the Public's Expectations". Frontiers in environmental science. 9. doi:10.3389/FENVS.2021.606416. ISSN 2296-665X. Wikidata Q111095722.
