= Gasperini =

Gasperini is an Italian surname. Notable people with the surname include:

- Gian Piero Gasperini (born 1958), Italian football player and coach
- Giovanni Gasperini (1886–?), Italian gymnast
- Maria Caserini née Gasperini (1884–1969), Italian stage and film actress

== See also ==
- A commune in Pecetto di Valenza
- Gasperini v. Center for Humanities (1996), a US Supreme Court case
