= Wolfgang Kasper =

Australian economist, linguist, and traveller (1939–2023)

- Born: 18 March 1939; Germany
- Died: 13 August 2023 (aged 84); Port Douglas, Australia

Academic background
- Education: Saarland University, University of Kiel
- Influences: Herbert Giersch, Friedrich A. Hayek, Joseph A. Schumpeter, Fritz Machlup, Thomas Sowell

Academic work
- Discipline: Institutional economics, political economy

Wolfgang Kasper (18 March 1939 – 13 August 2023) was an Australian economist, linguist and traveller. From 1999, he was an emeritus professor of economics of the University of New South Wales. He is best known internationally for his institutional economics textbook and in Australia for his advocacy of market deregulation.

== Career ==
Born in Germany in 1939, he spent his formative school years in Germany and the Principality of Liechtenstein. From 1959, he studied modern languages at the Interpreters' Institute of the University of the Saar, Saarbrücken, Germany, and soon also took up law and economics at the Universities of Saarbrücken and Kiel, as well as at academic organisations in London and Paris.

From the mid-1960s, Kasper worked first on the small research staff of the German Council of Economic Advisors and then at the Kiel Institute of World Economics. He earned a Ph.D. summa cum laude from Kiel University on issues in international finance. In the early 1970s, he served as a Harvard University Advisor to the Malaysian Minister of Finance in Kuala Lumpur.

Subsequently, he joined the Australian National University in Canberra. From 1977 to 1999, he was the foundation professor of economics of the University of New South Wales, first at Royal Military College, Duntroon, then at the new Australian Defence Force Academy (ADFA) in Canberra. He also undertook work assignments at the Reserve Bank of Australia, the Organisation for Economic Co-operation and Development (OECD) in Paris and the Federal Reserve of San Francisco. From 1999 to 2006, he served as a senior fellow of the Centre for Independent Studies, a Sydney-based free-market think tank. In 2003, the Commonwealth government awarded him the Centenary Medal for his work in economics.

Kasper had a long record of research and consulting for international businesses and governments. An early interest was the reform of the international monetary system, having been the ‘Benjamin’ in the eminent Bürgenstock Group of academics and bankers, who paved the way for floating exchange rates in the late 1960s and early 1970s. He has also published on international migration and the relocation of industries from mature, high-cost economies to new, low-cost places, as well as on institutional economics, i.e. the importance of habits, work practices, customs, legislation and regulations to shaping a community's economic growth potential. In a complex modern economy with an emphasis on differentiated services, mores and laws constitute ‘institutional capital’, which is central to international competitiveness and the long-term growth potential. Based on this conviction, he became an early advocate of liberalisation of factor and product markets in Australia and New Zealand.

== Personal life and death ==
Kasper spent his retirement on the far south coast of New South Wales. He was married to Regine (née Deiglmayr) from 1966. They had two married daughters and four grandchildren.

On 13 August 2023, whilst in Port Douglas for an extended wintersun holiday, Kaspar died from a stroke. He was 84.

== Publications ==
Kasper published some 20 monographs and more than 300 articles on political economy and institutional economics. Some of his publications work have been translated into Mandarin, Turkish, Spanish, French, Hindi, Persian, Russian and Arabic.
