= Judith D. Kasper =

American researcher (1948–2021)

Judith D. Kasper (1948–2021) was an American researcher focused on aging.

== Biography ==
Born in Dodge City, Kansas, she completed her undergraduate studies at the University of Kansas in 1970 and pursued a master's (1973) and Ph.D. (1976) in sociology at the University of Chicago.

After moving to Maryland in 1977, Kasper held positions at various healthcare research institutions. In 1987, she became a professor in the Department of Health Policy and Management at Johns Hopkins University's Bloomberg School of Public Health.

In 2011, Kasper initiated the National Study of Caregiving.

Over her career, Kasper authored two books and co-authored over 150 peer-reviewed publications. She also co-developed the National Health and Aging Trends Study with Vicki A. Freedman, which annually interviewed 8,000 older Americans, generating data on late-life disability trends.
