= Dirk Caspers =

German footballer

Personal information
- Full name: Dirk Caspers
- Date of birth: 31 May 1980 (age 46)
- Place of birth: Neuss, West Germany
- Height: 1.85 m (6 ft 1 in)
- Position: Defender

Senior career*
Years	Team	Apps	(Gls)
2000–2001	Bor. Mönchengladbach II	15	(0)
2001–2003	Alemannia Aachen II		
2003	Alemannia Aachen	10	(1)
2003–2005	Schalke 04 II	18	(0)
2005–2006	SG Wattenscheid 09	21	(3)
2006–2007	SC Preußen Münster	31	(5)
2007–2008	Bonner SC	23	(1)
2008	Schwarz-Weiß Essen	15	(0)
2008–2010	Rot-Weiss Essen II	47	(2)
2009–2010	Rot-Weiss Essen	12	(0)
2010–2012	Fortuna Köln	46	(1)
2012–2013	SC Kapellen-Erft	19	(1)
- * Club domestic league appearances and goals

Dirk Caspers (born 31 May 1980 in Duisburg) is a German former footballer.

== Career ==
Caspers played for several clubs in North Rhine-Westphalia, including many reserve teams, and made 10 appearances in the 2. Bundesliga for Alemannia Aachen.
