= Kasper (given name) =

Male given name

Kasper is a masculine given name which may refer to:

- Kasper Andersen (cyclist) (born 2002), Danish cyclist
- Kasper Andersen (speedway rider) (born 1998), Danish speedway rider
- Kasper Irming Andersen (born 1986), Danish handball player
- Kasper Bøgelund (born 1980), Danish retired footballer
- Kasper Dolberg (born 1997), Danish footballer
- Kasper Fisker (born 1988), Danish footballer
- Kasper Goltwurm (1524–1559), German Lutheran theologian - see Philip III, Count of Nassau-Weilburg
- Kasper Hakunti (born 1988), Finnish curler
- Kasper Hämäläinen (born 1986), Finnish footballer
- Kasper Hjulmand (born 1972), Danish football manager and former player
- Kasper Høgh (born 2000), Danish footballer
- Kasper Hvidt (born 1976), Danish handball goalkeeper
- Kasper Jørgensen (handballer) (born 1977), Danish handballer
- Kasper Winther Jørgensen (born 1985), Danish rower
- Kasper Kusk (born 1991), Danish footballer
- Kasper Lorentzen (born 1985), Danish footballer
- Kasper Nielsen (born 1975), Danish team handball player
- Kasper Niesiecki (1682–1744), Polish heraldist, Jesuit, lexicographer, writer, theologian and preacher
- Kasper Ødum (born 1979), Danish badminton player
- Kasper Pedersen (born 1993), Danish footballer
- Kasper Povlsen (born 1989), Danish footballer
- Kasper Risgård (born 1983), Danish footballer
- Kasper Schmeichel (born 1986), Danish football goalkeeper
- Kasper Skaanes (born 1995), Norwegian footballer
- Kasper Søndergaard (born 1981), Danish handball player
- Kasper Straube (fl. 1473–1477), German printer

== See also ==
- Kaspar
- Casper
