= Gohar Markosjan-Käsper =

Armenian writer

Gohar Markosjan-Käsper (Armenian: Գոհար Մարկոսյան-Կասպեր; 14 July 1949, Yerevan – 15 September 2015, Barcelona) was an Armenian writer who lived in Tallinn, Estonia.

== Biography ==
Her father was an opera singer and her mother, a ballet-dancer. She graduated from Yerevan State Medical University and married Kalle Käsper, an Estonian writer and translator, in 1990. Before moving to Estonia, Gohar Markosjan worked as a doctor in Yerevan.

Markosjan-Käsper's best-known work is probably the novel Penelope (translated into French, German - as Penelope, die Listenreiche, Dutch and Spanish). Her novels Helena and The Caryatides have also been successful in Russia and Western Europe. Her works have been characterized as magical realist.

She wrote in Russian. Markosjan-Käsper was also a member of the Estonian Writers' Union.

== Bibliography ==
- Penelope (1998)
- Helena (2000)
- The Caryatides (2003)
- Penelope Starts the Journey (2007)
- Mycenae, Rich in Gold (2009)
- Memento mori (2012)
