= John Luers =

American Catholic bishop

The Right Reverend John Henry Luers
- Bishop of Fort Wayne
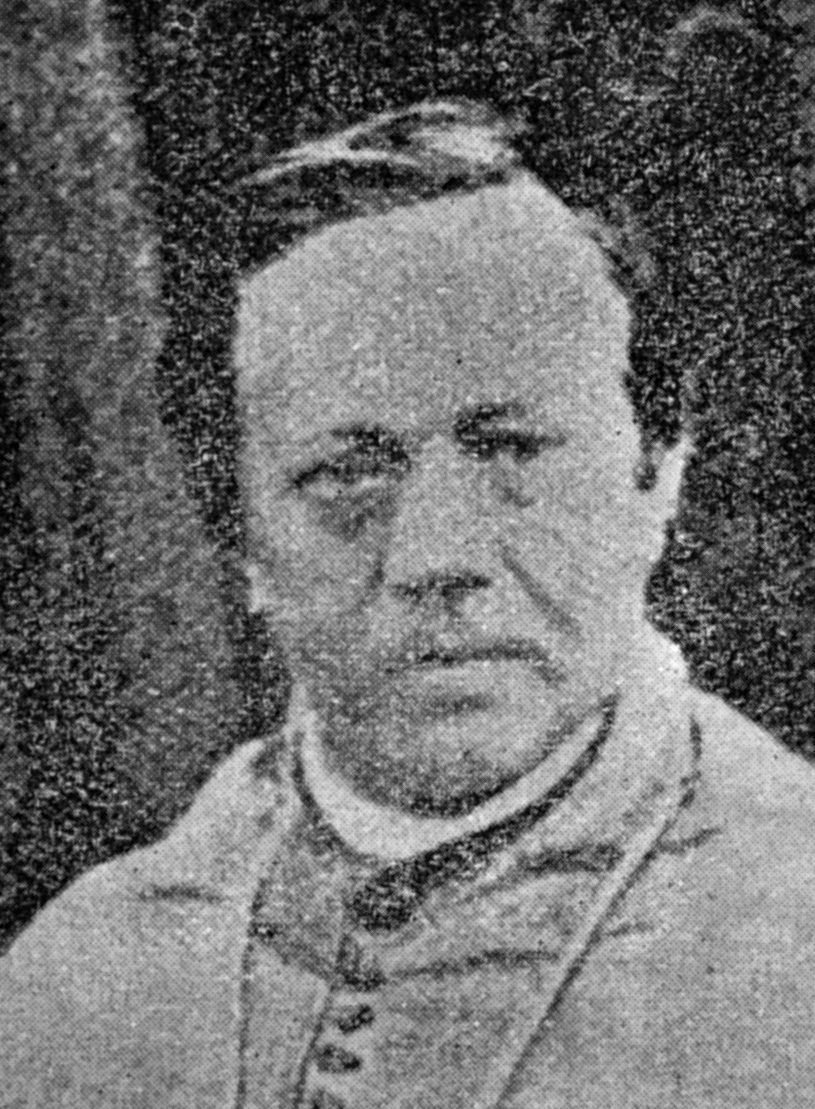
- Church: Catholic Church
- Diocese: Fort Wayne
- Appointed: September 22, 1857
- Term ended: June 29, 1871
- Predecessor: Office established
- Successor: Joseph Dwenger

Orders
- Ordination: November 11, 1846 by John Baptist Purcell
- Consecration: January 10, 1858 by John Baptist Purcell

Personal details
- Born: Johann Heinrich Luers; September 29, 1819 Lutten, Grand Duchy of Oldenburg
- Died: June 29, 1871 (aged 51) Cleveland, Ohio, U.S.

John Henry Luers (born Johann Heinrich Luers; September 29, 1819 – June 29, 1871) was an American Catholic prelate who served as the first Bishop of Fort Wayne from 1858 until his death in 1871.

== Early life and education ==
Luers was born on September 29, 1819, in Lutten, a town near Münster in the Grand Duchy of Oldenburg, which is part of the present-day Goldenstedt, in the German state of Lower Saxony. He was the son of Arnold Heinrich and Maria Elisabeth (née Kröger) Luers. In 1833, the family immigrated to the United States, settling on a farm in Piqua, Ohio. They were parishioners at St. Augustine's Church in nearby Minster.

As a teenager in Piqua, Luers befriended Mahlon Dickerson Manson, who later served as a Union general in the American Civil War and a U.S. Representative from Indiana. He first worked as a clerk at a store in Piqua. During this period, he once forgot his prayers at a family gathering. He later recalled, "The subsequent interview between my father and myself was of such a striking nature that I received sufficient reasons to promise to relearn what I had forgotten. It was a sore lesson, but one which I never forgot."

According to a later account by John Baptist Purcell, then Bishop of Cincinnati, Purcell first encountered Luers in 1835: "While on my way to an appointment in Ohio, on horseback, he trudged along on foot beside me, going to church. I secured him a ride behind one of my companions...He stated his desire to study for the priesthood." Luers then studied at St. Francis Xavier Seminary in Brown County.

== Priesthood ==
Luers was ordained a priest by Bishop Purcell on November 11, 1846. His first and only assignment as a priest was as pastor of St. Joseph's Church in Cincinnati, a parish for German-speaking immigrants.

As pastor, Luers finished the construction of the church at Linn and Laurel Streets, added a parochial school, and eliminated the parish's debt. He also baptized Henry K. Moeller, the future Archbishop of Cincinnati.

== Bishop of Fort Wayne ==
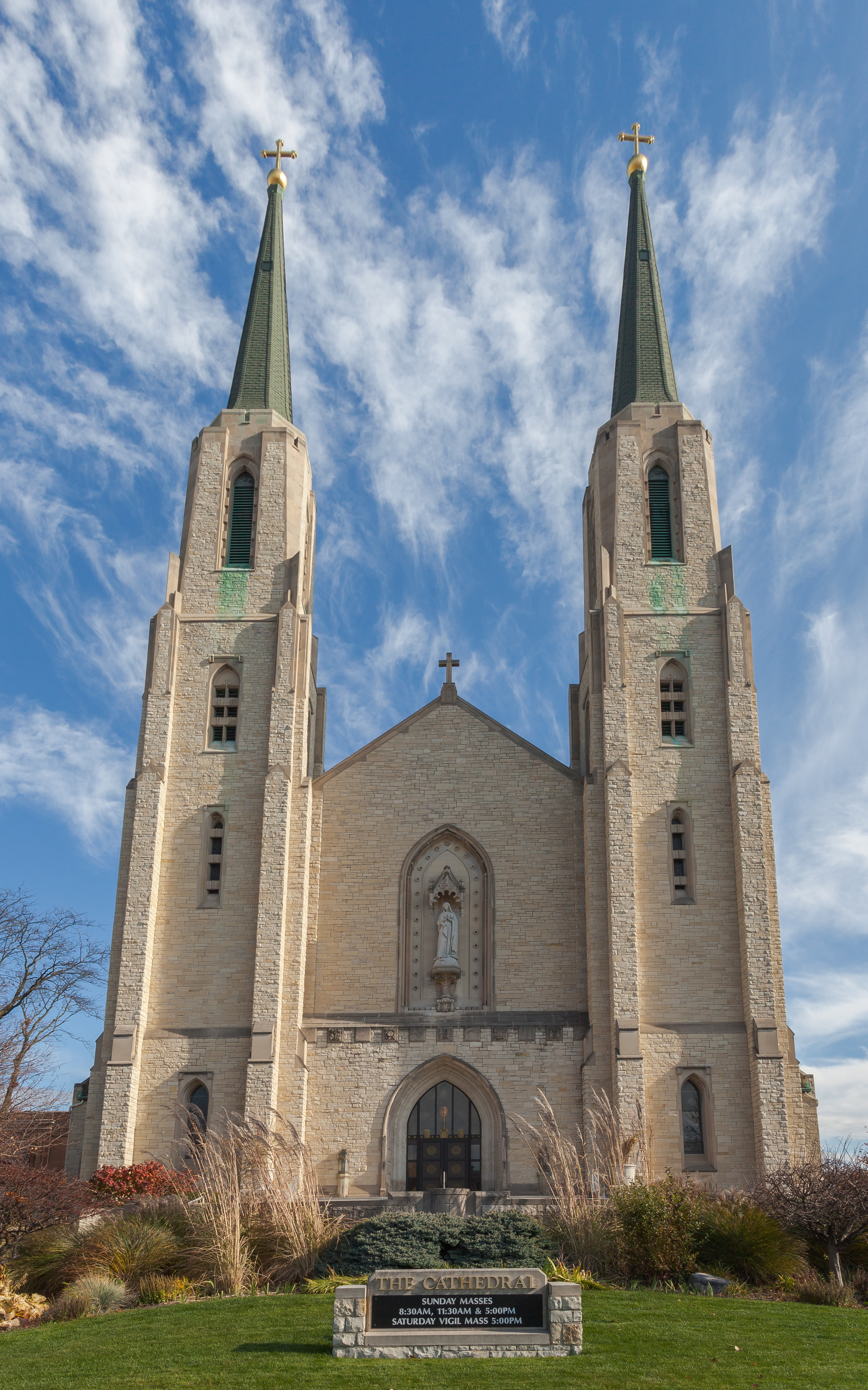
Cathedral of the Immaculate Conception, Fort Wayne, Indiana (2012)

In January 1857, the Diocese of Fort Wayne was erected from the Diocese of Vincennes, comprising the northern half of Indiana. In April of that year, Archbishop Purcell submitted to Rome a terna, or list of three candidates, to serve as the diocese's first bishop—Revs. Luers, Julian Benoit, and Pirmin Everhard. The Congregation for the Propagation of the Faith (which then oversaw the affairs of the Church in the United States) nominated Luers on the following August 31, and Pope Pius IX confirmed his appointment on September 22.

Luers received his episcopal consecration on January 10, 1858, from Archbishop Purcell at the Cathedral of St. Peter in Chains, with Bishops Jacques-Maurice De Saint Palais and George Aloysius Carrell serving as co-consecrators. Upon his arrival, the Diocese of Fort Wayne contained 14 priests and 20 churches to serve a Catholic population between 18,000 and 20,000. It also included the University of Notre Dame, run by the Congregation of Holy Cross. By the end of his tenure, the diocese contained 69 priests, 75 churches, and 50,000 Catholics.

Luers laid the cornerstone of the Cathedral of the Immaculate Conception on June 19, 1859, and dedicated it on December 9, 1860. In 1863, he held a diocesan synod at the University of Notre Dame in which he established the laws and constitution for the diocese, including the elimination of trusteeism. In 1868, Luers established an orphanage in Rensselaer, Indiana, for children who had been orphaned during the Civil War. To serve the large German-speaking population in the diocese, he invited the Poor Handmaids of Jesus Christ, a German religious order, to come to the diocese in 1868; the sisters established St. Joseph Hospital in 1869.

Luers attended the Second Plenary Council of Baltimore (1866), but he did not attend the First Vatican Council (1868–1870) in order to tend to the needs of his diocese.

=== Death and legacy ===
In June 1871, with the Diocese of Cleveland vacant, Luers was invited to confer holy orders on a number of seminarians. On the morning of June 29, after performing the ceremonies, he collapsed from apoplexy on his way to the railroad station. He was taken to a nearby rectory, where he died shortly afterward, at the age of 51.

His Requiem Mass was celebrated by Bishop De Saint Palais at the Cathedral of the Immaculate Conception, with Archbishop Purcell delivering the eulogy. He was buried in the crypt of the cathedral.

The Franciscan Order founded Bishop Luers High School in 1958 in Fort Wayne.

== Sources ==
- Hoying, Louis A. (1982). Pilgrims All: A History of Saint Augustine Parish, Minster, Ohio.
- White, Joseph M. (2007). Worthy of the Gospel of Christ: A History of the Catholic Diocese of Fort Wayne–South Bend.

Catholic Church titles
Preceded by Founder	Bishop of Fort Wayne; 1855–1871	Succeeded by Joseph Dwenger
