= Dernbach, Westerwaldkreis =

Dernbach
- Municipality
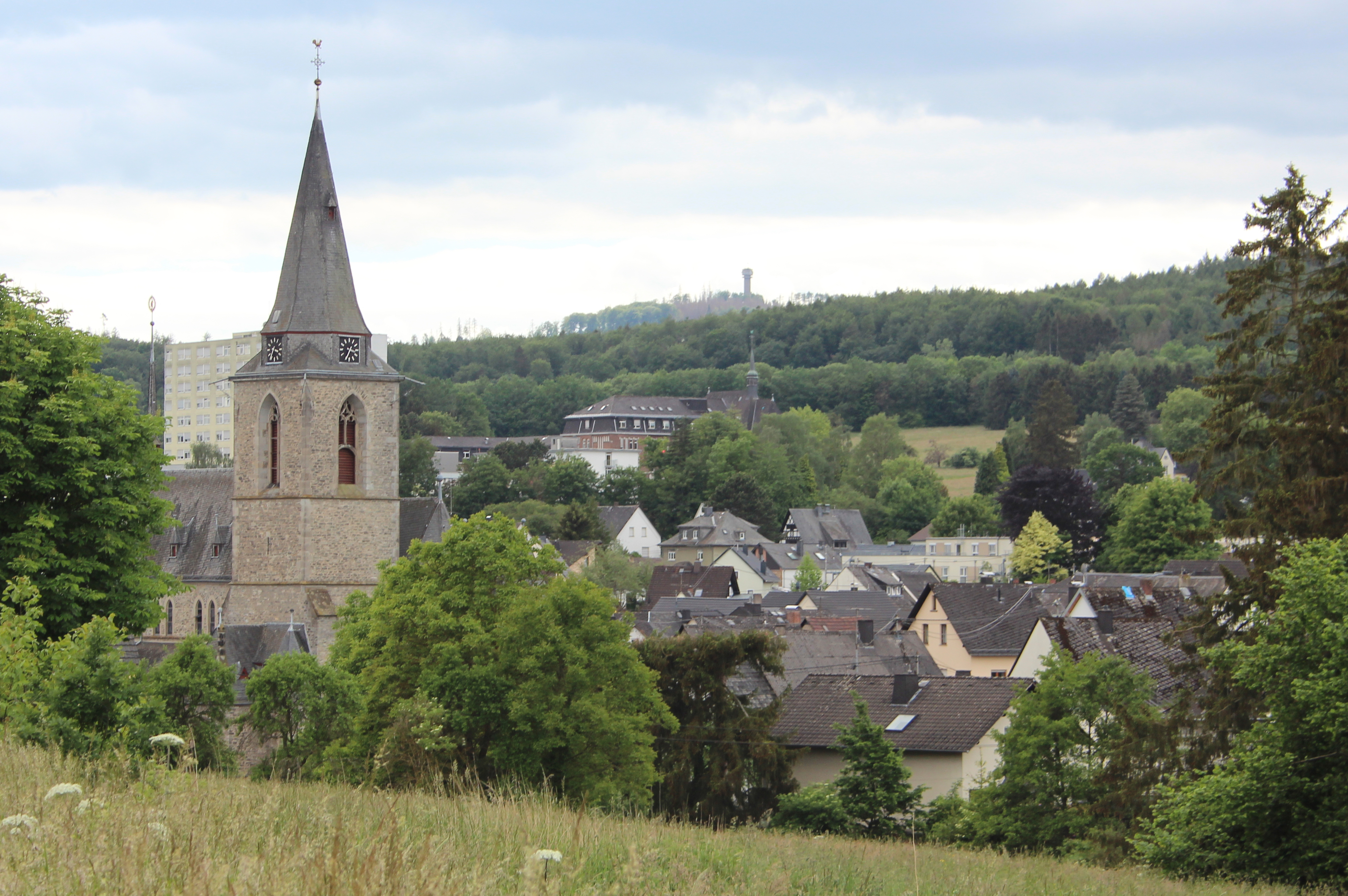

- Coat of arms

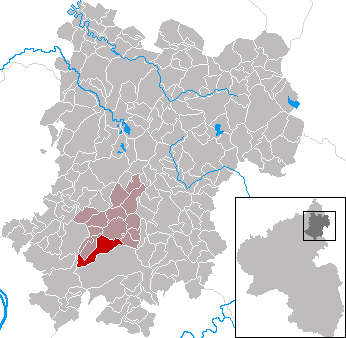
- Location of Dernbach within Westerwaldkreis district
- Interactive map of Dernbach
- Location within Germany Location within Rhineland-Palatinate
- Coordinates: 50°27′31″N 7°47′14″E
- Country: Germany
- State: Rhineland-Palatinate
- District: Westerwaldkreis
- Municipal assoc.: Wirges

Government
  - Mayor (2019–24): Andreas Quirmbach (CDU)

Area
  - Total: 8.76 km^{2} (3.38 sq mi)
- Elevation: 260 m (850 ft)

Population (2025-12-31)
  - Total: 2,561
  - Density: 292/km^{2} (757/sq mi)
- Time zone: UTC+01:00 (CET)
  - Summer (DST): UTC+02:00 (CEST)
- Postal codes: 56428
- Dialling codes: 02602
- Vehicle registration: WW
- Website: www.dernbach.de

Dernbach (Westerwald) (German pronunciation: [ˈdɛʁnbax]) is a local municipality (Ortsgemeinde) in the district of Westerwaldkreis in Rhineland-Palatinate, Germany, and part of the municipal association Verbandsgemeinde Wirges. The village is known throughout the country by the three-way interchange A48/A3, called Dernbacher Dreieck, and well known worldwide by the international congregation Poor Handmaids of Jesus Christ, called Dernbacher Schwestern.

== Etymology ==
Unlike many other surrounding villages, Dernbach has not a Central Franconian, but a Celtic toponym. Several communities and families have the same name, so it has become customary to say "Dernbach bei Montabaur", to avoid confusion.

== Geography ==
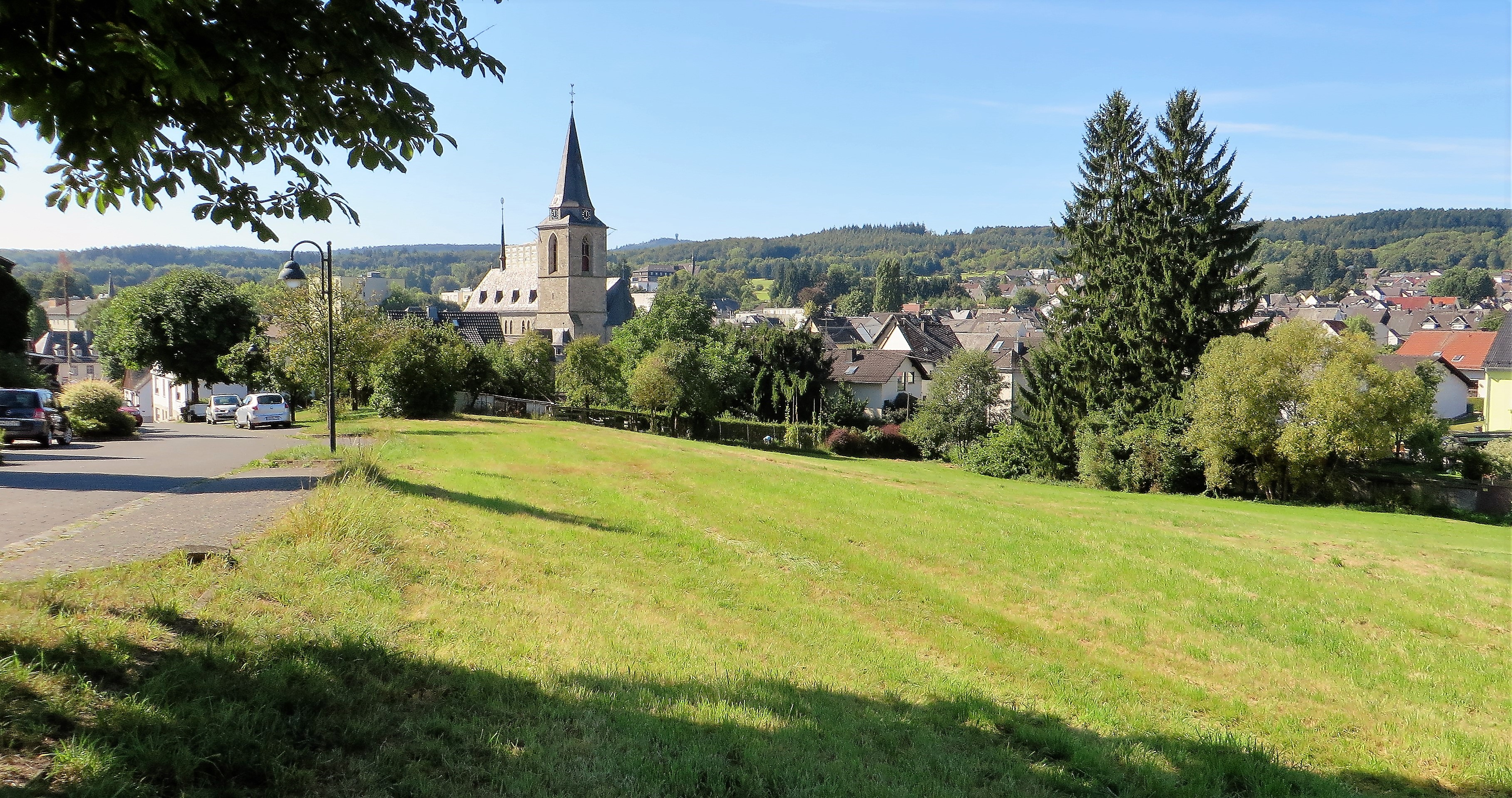
Dernbach Nordansicht

=== Location ===
Dernbach is located north of the city of Montabaur within the wooded hills of the national nature reserve "Naturpark Nassau". Surrounding villages are Ebernhahn, Wirges, Staudt, Eschelbach and Elgendorf.

=== Geology ===
Due to its subterranean natural resources, such as iron ore, silver and lead deposits, Dernbach was characterized by intensive mining for a long time.

=== Climate ===
Dernbach has a temperate-oceanic climate with cool winters and warm summers. Its average annual temperature is 8,9 °C (48 °F). In January the mean temperature is -2,0 °C (28 °F), while the mean temperature in July is 22 °C (71 °F). Temperatures can vary significantly over the course of a month with warmer and colder weather. Precipitation is spread evenly throughout the year with a light peak in summer due to showers and thunderstorms.

== History ==
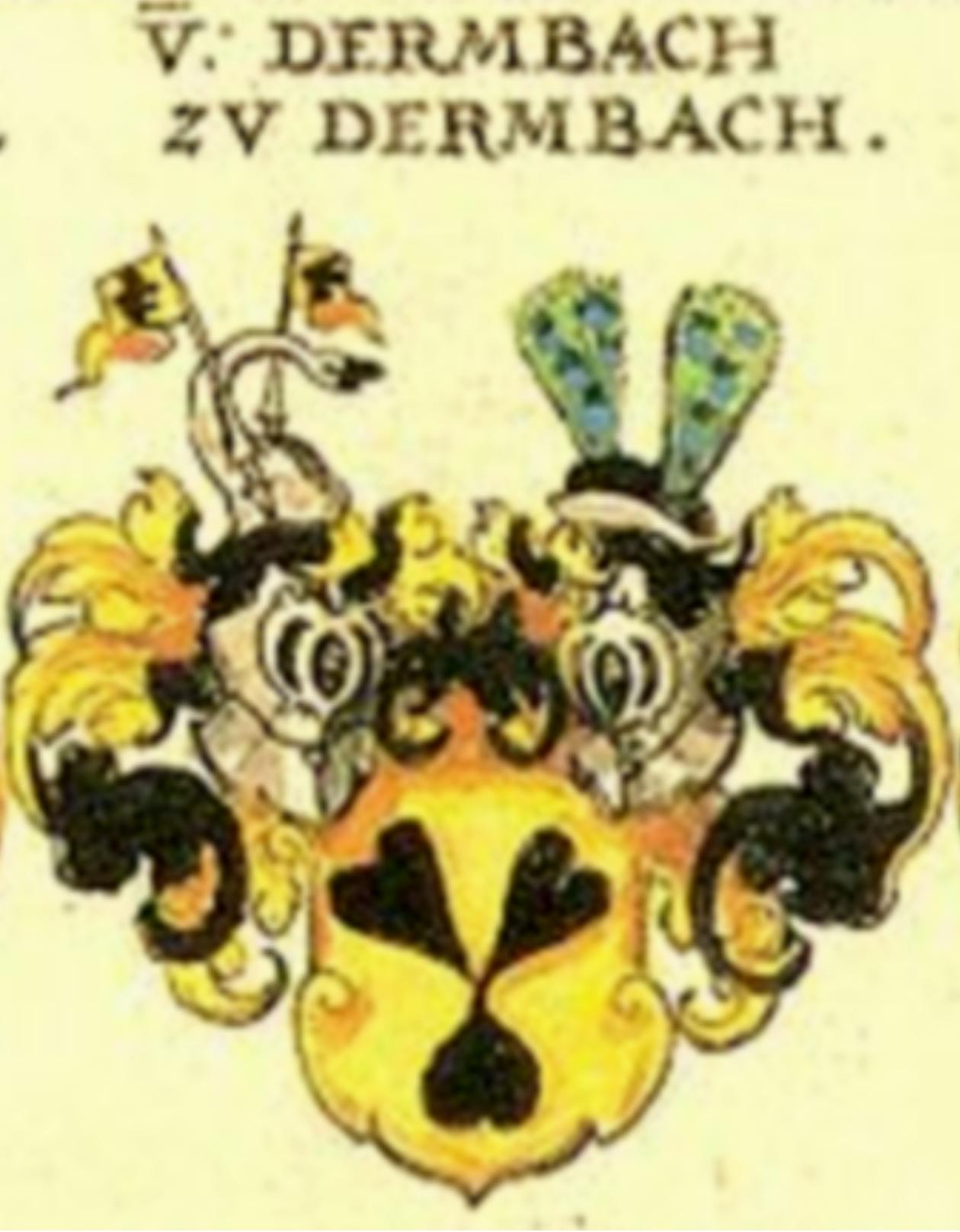
Coat of arms of the Dernbach noble family

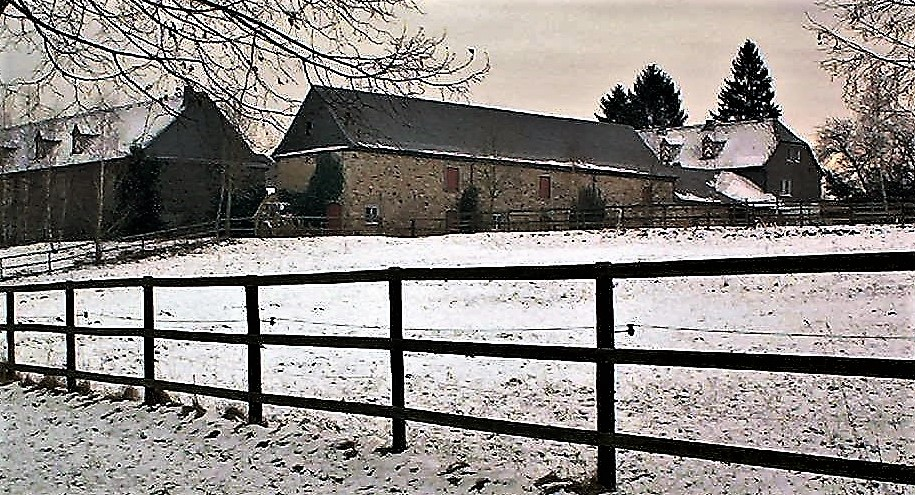
The courtyard of Dernbach, built in 1815 AD.

Under its former name "Derinbach", the rural commune was mentioned in a document for the first time in 1220 AD. The medieval village structure was dominated by an impressive knight's castle (build around 1200 AD) and a much older chapel, built after 1136 AD in late Romanesque style. The knightly family of Dernbach, related to the noble House of Isenburg in terms of ministeriality, guarded and defended the nearby residence of the Archbishop and Prince-elector of Trier in Montabaur (castellum Humbacense) after his return from a Crusade in the Holy Land (1217 AD). As the male line of the family died (around 1400 AD), the famous Hilchen von Lorch inherited the Dernbach castle and owned it for almost 300 years. After the end of the Holy Roman Empire the medieval moated fortress in Dernbach was converted into a courtyard (1812/15 AD) by the House of Nassau. The ancient chapel dedicated to St. Lawrence was demolished in 1901, when for the first time a parish church was erected in Dernbach. The famous assembly of sculptures (early 15th century) which belonged to the chapel, the so-called 'Dernbacher Beweinung', a group made out of clay, was transferred to Limburg, where it now can be seen in the diocesan museum.

=== Maria Katharina Kasper ===
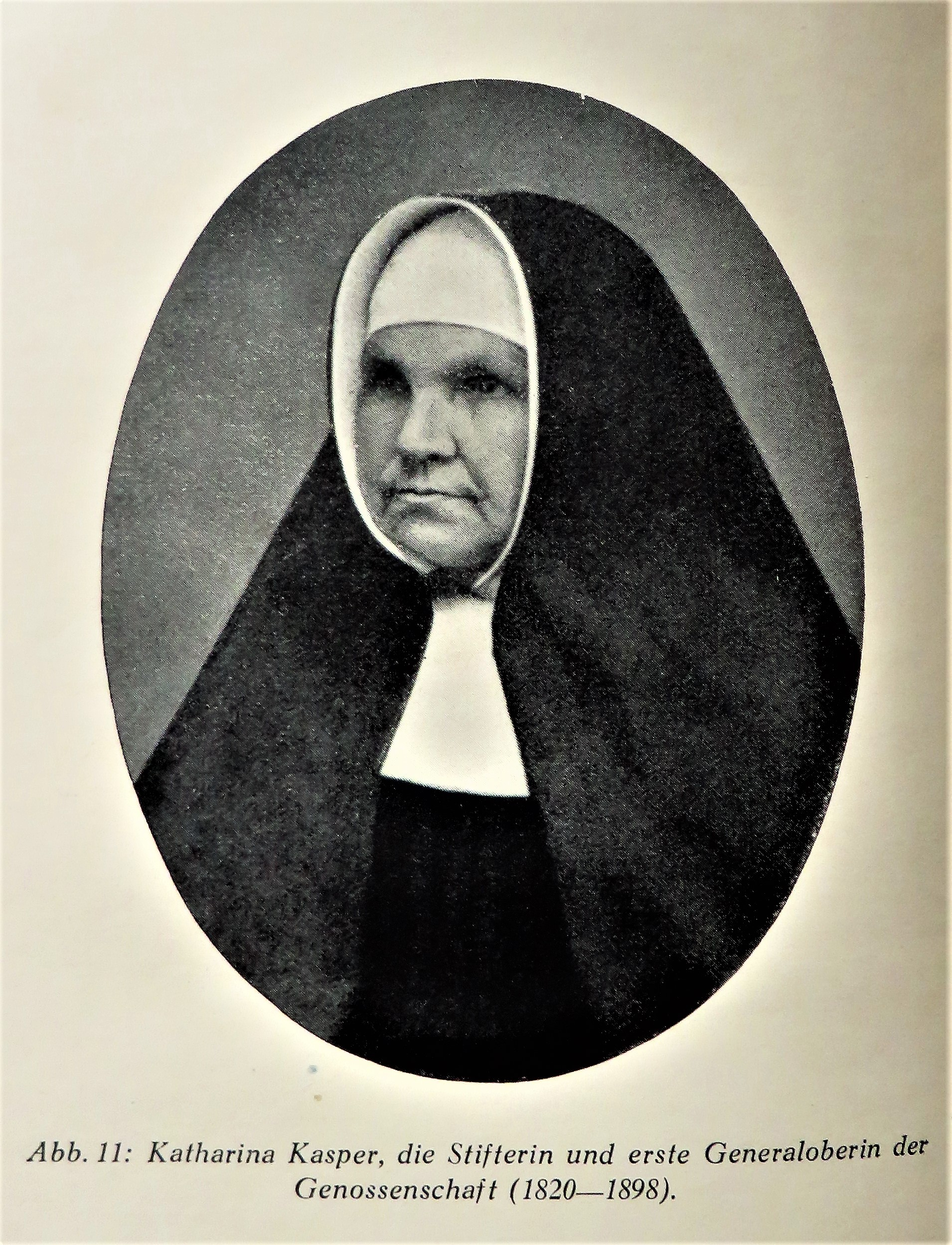
Katharina Kasper (1820–1898)

The village owes its popularity primarily to the extraordinary life and work of the blessed Maria Katharina Kasper (May 26, 1820 – February 2, 1898 AD). Born and grown up in Dernbach as a child of small farmers, she everywhere noticed the misery and distress of the fellow human being and she was not willing to accept this for the rest of her life. Whenever possible, she went to the catholic school, above all because of the religious education. As a young woman she founded a pious association of young people, to help those in need. Finally the child's vision of a monastic life generously serving the poor and the sick became real in 1851 AD, when she founded the first new congregation of sisters in the 1827 newly established diocese of Limburg (Lahn). In the following years further stations were established in and outside of Dernbach. When the foundress died (2 February 1898), the congregation Poor Handmaids of Jesus Christ had 193 branches all over the world. In the early 20th century the international religious order grew up to more than 4,500 nuns, in Germany, Netherlands, England, USA – just to mention a few countries. Maria Katharina Kasper was beatified on April 16, 1978, by Pope Paul VI, as the miracle needed for her beatification was reaffirmed. The motherhouse – today a modern building complex – houses the so-called Generalate (the order's highest administrative center), and the German provincialate, i.e. the order's administrative center for its province Germany. It is situated next to the Parish Church in the centre of the village. The order's current leadership consist out of sisters from India, Germany and the USA. On March 6, 2018, the Vatican announced the recognition of a new miracle. It ist said to have happened in 2011/12 at her intercession in India. She was canonized by Pope Francis in Rome on October 14, 2018.

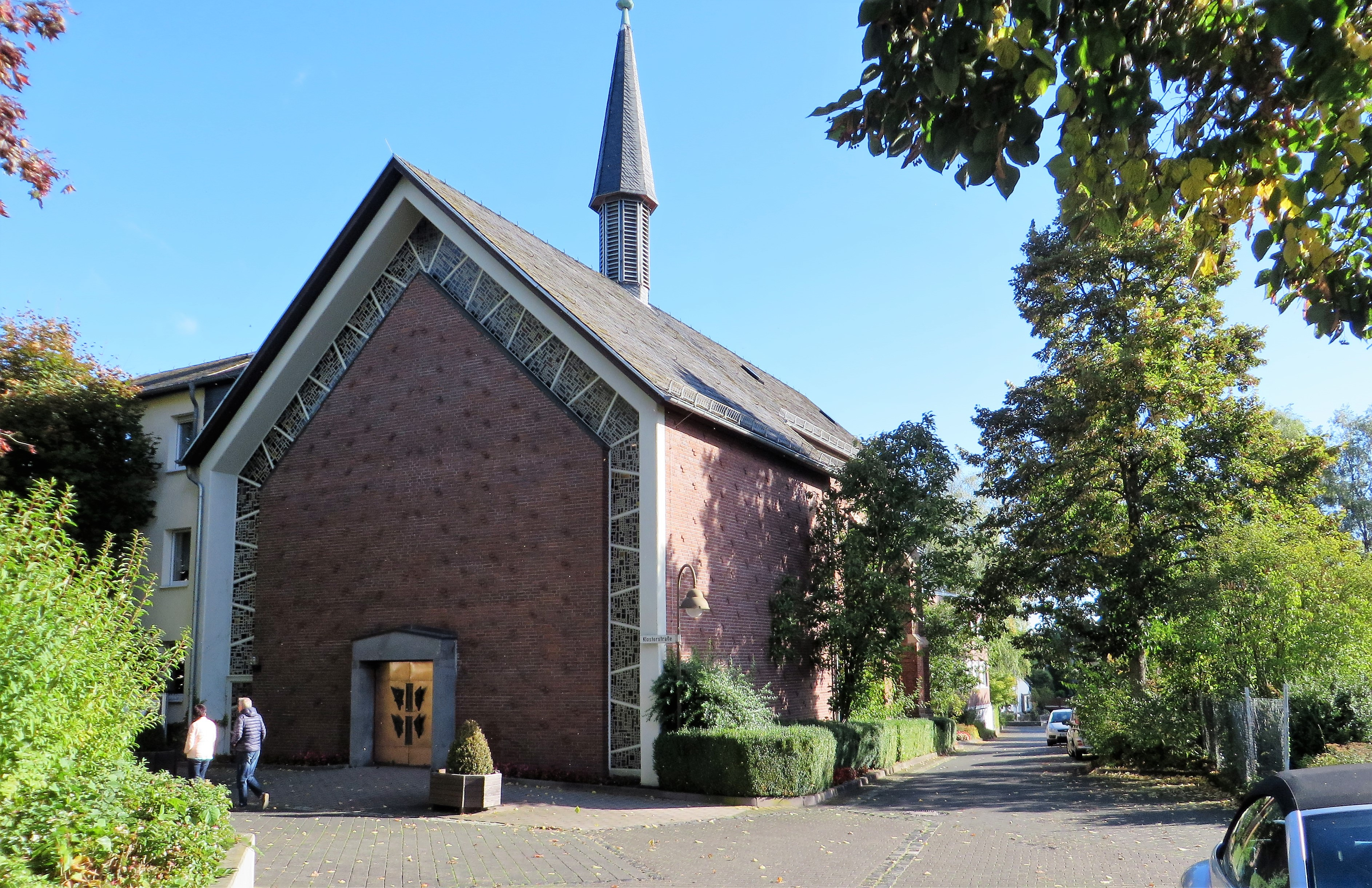
Klosterkirche in Dernbach

=== Historical population ===
Year	Pop.
1815	668
1835	822
1871	1,093
1905	1,763
1939	1,998
1950	2,272

Year	Pop.
1961	2,543
1970	2,759
1987	2,504
1997	2,676
2005	2,526
2025	2561

=== municipality council ===
The council is made up of 21 council members, including the extraofficial mayor (Bürgermeister), who were elected in a majority vote in a municipal election on 7 June 2009.

== Economy and infrastructure ==
=== Education ===
300 years of school history document the tremendous importance of education for Dernbach and its long-term development. The challenge of a growing population in the long run could be met by investing in classrooms and school buildings. The "Pfarrer-Giessendorf-Schule" from the 1960s, renovated just a few years ago, today is a primary school. Meanwhile, a private school is located at the site too.

=== Transport ===
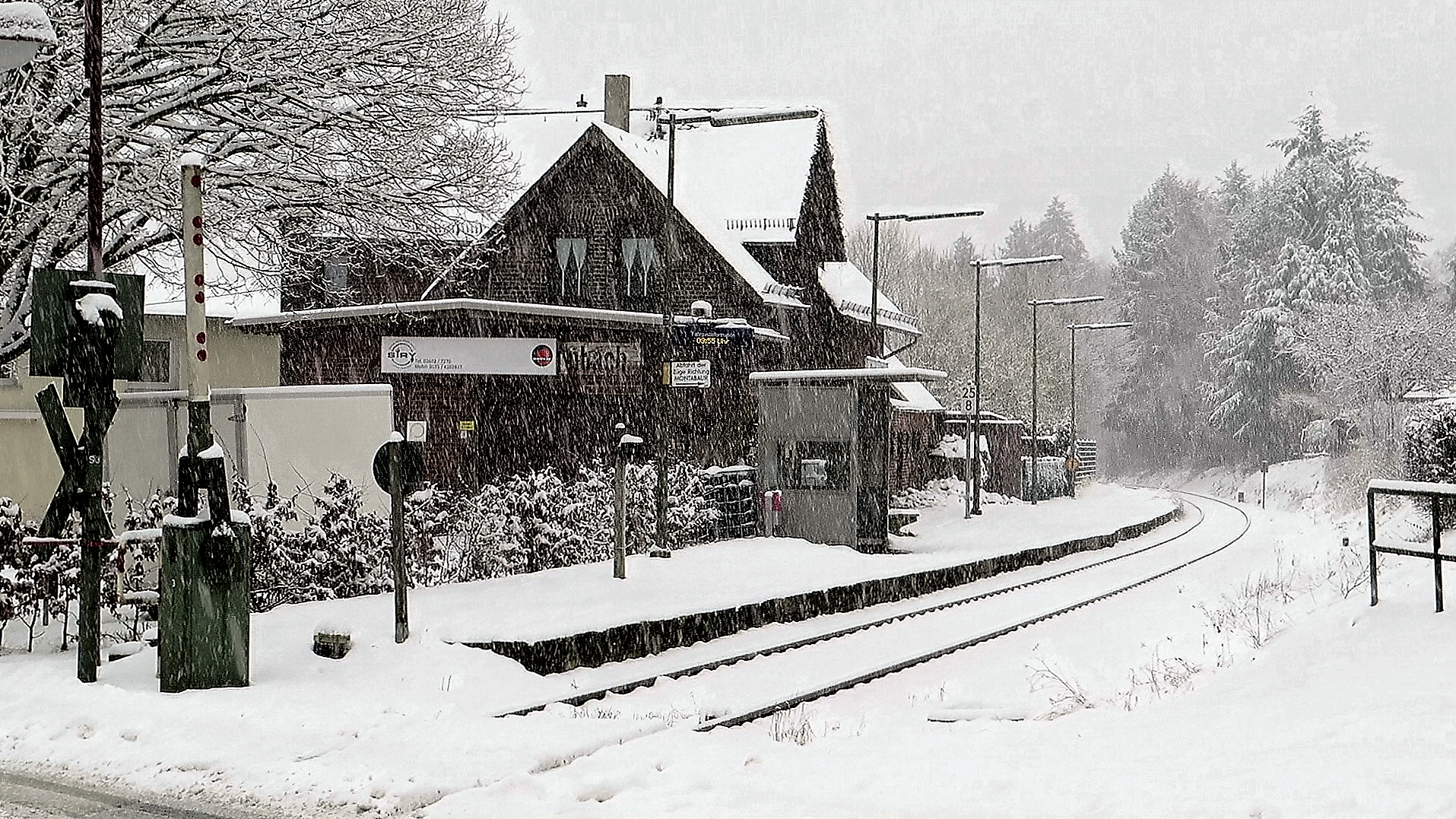
Dernbach train stop

Dernbach is served by the local bus lines 420, 425, 481 and 958. Dernbach is located in the area of the transport association Verkehrsverbund Rhein-Mosel (VRM), zones 412 and 414.

The Zweckverband SPNV Nord plans the reactivation of the Brexbach Valley Railway from Neuwied via Ransbach-Baumbach to Siershahn station and continuing via Wirges and Dernbach to Montabaur station.

The nearest highway entry/exit A 3 (Cologne–Frankfurt) is Montabaur, some 3 km away. The next InterCityExpress stop is at Montabaur station on the Cologne-Frankfurt high-speed rail line, crossing the A3/A48 interchange through the modern Dernbach Tunnel, built in the late 20th century.

The regional rail service Lower Westerwald Railway (Unterwesterwaldbahn), RB29, connecting Limburg and Siershahn, operated by DreiLänderBahn, a section of Hessische Landesbahn, (HLB) stops at the old village station in Dernbach, built in 1902.

=== Public institutions ===
- The Herz-Jesu-Krankenhaus, a hospital founded in 1904 and expanded in 1972.
- The Altenheim St. Josef, a retirement home founded in the 1990s.
- The Hospiz St. Thomas, a hospice founded in 2017.

=== Sons and daughters of the town ===
- Maria Katharina Kasper (1820–1898), canonized founder of an order, the Arme Dienstmägde Jesu Christi (“Poor Handmaids of Jesus Christ”)
