= Kalle Käsper =

Estonian writer (born 1952)

Kalle Käsper (born 1952 in Tallinn) is an Estonian writer.

== Biography ==
Käsper was the husband of Armenian writer Gohar Markosjan-Käsper. Notable works by Käsper include "Buridanid", "Taani prints Hamlet, nuhk" (Hamlet, Prince of Denmark, a Spy). He has co-authored the screenplay of "Jüri Rumm", a popular Estonian film (of 1994). His novel "Üksindus on hommikuti hell" (Loneliness is tender in the morning) has been translated into Russian (Russian: Oda utrennemu odinočestvu), was published in the literary journal Neva. Käsper's work "Saksamaa õppetunnid”" (The Lessons of Germany) won a yearly prize of the Russian magazine Zvezda, where this translation was published.

In recent years, Käsper has published in Estonian newspapers comments on politics and current affairs, distinguished by criticism towards the developments in post-Soviet Estonia and disapproval of cultural Americanisation. Käsper as a publicist is also supportive of Russia and Russian president Vladimir Putin and has expressed nostalgic attitudes to some aspects of the Soviet period. Käsper (a Russian philologist by education) has also translated into Estonian a number of works by Russian authors.

== Selected works ==
- Alliksandriine (2003)
- Vennad Luiged (2002)
- Taani prints Hamlet, nuhk (2004)
