= Casper =

Casper may refer to:

== People ==
- Casper (given name)
- Casper (surname)
- Casper (Maya ruler) (422–487?), ruler of the Mayan city of Palenque
- Tok Casper, first known king of Maya city-state Quiriguá in Guatemala, ruling beginning in 426
- David Gray (snooker player) (born 1979), nicknamed Casper
- Casper (rapper) (born 1982), German musician
- DJ Casper (1965–2023), American musician

== Places in the United States ==
- Casper, Wyoming, a city
- Casper Mountain, overlooking Casper, Wyoming

== Entertainment ==
- Casper the Friendly Ghost, a Paramount cartoon character owned by Harvey Comics
  - Casper the Friendly Ghost in film, a series of films based on the Harvey Comics character
    - Casper (film), a 1995 live-action film featuring Casper the Friendly Ghost
    - Casper: A Spirited Beginning, a direct-to-video prequel of the 1995 film
    - Casper Meets Wendy, a direct-to-video sequel to Casper: A Spirited Beginning
    - Casper's Haunted Christmas, a direct-to-video animated feature set in Christmas Time
    - Casper's Scare School, second direct-to-video animated film
  - Casper and the Spectrals, a 2009–2010 three-issue comic book miniseries that revamped Casper the Friendly Ghost
  - Casper (video game), a series of video games based on the 1995 film
- "Casper" (song), by Takeoff
- "The Day That Never Comes", a song by Metallica with the working title "Casper"

== Science and technology ==
- Casper (persistency), a file used for persistency in Linux
- Casper, the Apollo Command/Service Module of the Apollo 16 spacecraft

== Transportation ==
- Hyundai Casper, a sport utility vehicle

== Other uses ==
- USS Casper (PF-12), a World War II frigate
- Casper (admissions test), a medical school admissions test
- Casper (cat) (c. 1997 – 2010), a cat famous for riding on buses
- Casper College, Casper, Wyoming, US
- Casper (skateboarding), a skateboarding trick
- Casper Sleep, a mattress manufacturer
- Casper's, a hot dog restaurant chain in northern California

== See also ==
- Caspar (disambiguation)
- CASPR, a human protein
- Casspir, a South African armored personnel carrier
- Gasper (disambiguation)
- Kasper (disambiguation)
