= Casper (surname) =

Casper is a surname. Notable people with the surname include:

- Anne Casper (born 1965), American diplomat and ambassador
- Billy Casper (1931–2015), American golfer
- Chris Casper (born 1975), English former footballer and football manager
- Daniel Casper (born 2001), American curler
- Dave Casper (born 1951), American professional football player
- Drew Casper, American film historian and theorist
- Duncan Spears Casper, (1824–1898), early Mormon pioneer and one of the first settlers of Holladay, Utah.
- Gerhard Casper (born 1937), ninth president of Stanford University
- John Casper (born 1943), astronaut and U.S. Air Force colonel
- Siegfried Jost Casper (1929–2021), German biologist

== See also ==
- Donald Caspar (born 1927), American scientist
- Joseph Caspar (1799–1847), Swiss painter
- Michaela Caspar (born 1960), German actress
- Casper (disambiguation)
