= Gaspé =

Gaspé, Gaspésie, Gaspee, may refer to:

- Gaspé, Quebec, a city in eastern Canada
- Gaspé (electoral district), a past federal electoral district of Canada
- Gaspé (provincial electoral district), a provincial electoral district in Quebec
- Gaspé Bay, a bay located on the northeast coast of the namesake peninsula
- Gaspé Peninsula, a peninsula where both the city and district are located
- HMCS Gaspé, a Royal Canadian Navy shipname
- Gaspésie–Îles-de-la-Madeleine, the provincial region containing the Gaspé peninsula and the Magdalen Islands
- Gaspésie—Les Îles-de-la-Madeleine, a federal electoral district
- Gaspee Affair, U.S. War of Independence
- HMS Gaspee, a Royal Navy shipname
- Gaspee Point, Rhode Island, United States

== See also ==
- Cross of Gaspé
- Gasp (disambiguation)
