= Historiography of the Gaspee affair =

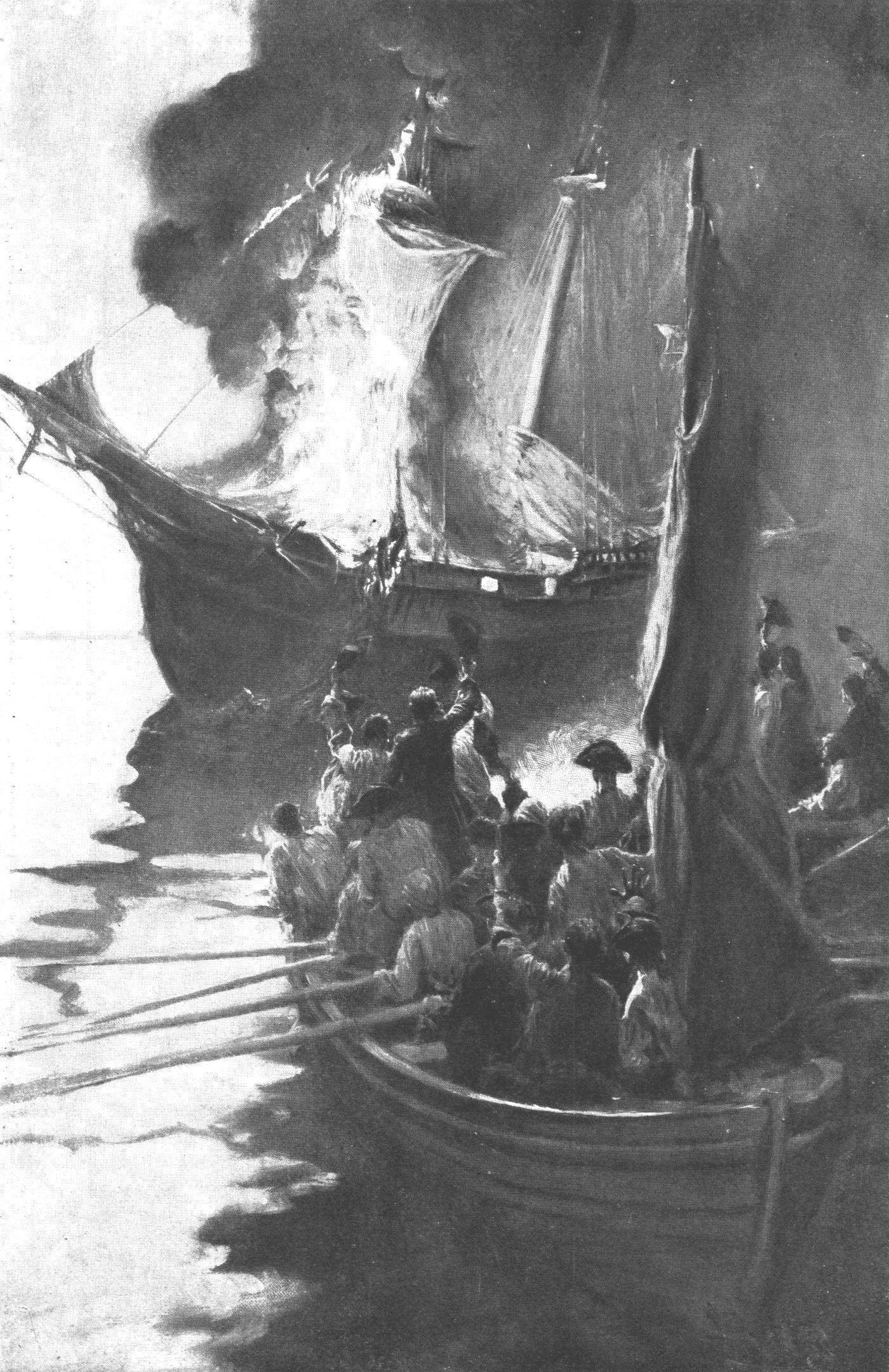
Burning of the Gaspee, an illustration depicting the destruction of the schooner by the colonists.

The historiography of the Gaspee affair examines the changing views of historians and scholars with regard to the burning of HMS Gaspee, a British customs schooner that ran aground while patrolling coastal waters near Warwick, Rhode Island and was boarded and destroyed by colonists during the lead up to the American Revolution in 1772. Scholars agree that the incident sparked a period of renewed tension between Great Britain and its American colonies, but they disagree as to the specific long- and short-term impacts of the attack on British and colonial policies and attitudes.

== Contemporaneous accounts ==
There were 38 newspapers in America in 1772. At least 11, mostly in the Northeast, reported the attack on the Gaspee within the first few weeks following the incident. Moreover, the Gaspee Commission of Inquiry was the topic of John Allen's An Oration, Upon the Beauties of Liberty, Or the Essential Rights of Americans, one of the most important pre-independence pamphlets to circulate within the colonies. Allen was a little-known preacher at the Second Baptist Church in Boston, but he gave an emotional sermon in December 1772. His Oration went through seven printings published in four different cities. Allen argued that Great Britain and the American colonies were separate judicial spheres and one could not interfere with the other. He addressed his message to Lord Dartmouth and portrayed the actions of Americans as merely self-defense, not rebellion, an important distinction for his audience in early 1773. Oration ranked among the best-selling pamphlets of the crisis.

Bernard Bailyn included Allen among three colonial pamphleteers who were able to demonstrate the "concentrated fury" comparable to that found in tracts and treaties by Europe's more imaginative and capable writers. Subsequent events quickly overshadowed the Gaspee incident, such as the Boston Tea Party.

Richard Snowden published The American Revolution; Written in the Style of Ancient History in Baltimore, and he started with the Boston Tea Party and made no mention of the Gaspee or any event prior to 1773. Mercy Otis Warren skipped from 1770 to 1773 in her massive two volume history of the American Revolution in 1805. Even a book focused on the Royal Navy's difficulties in the colonies from 1763 to 1782 failed to mention the Gaspee. No scholar has dedicated a monograph to the Gaspee episode, such as Benjamin Woods Labaree’s The Boston Tea Party or Hiller B. Zobel’s The Boston Massacre.

== Early 19th century ==
After 1800, chroniclers and biographers started to write histories about the events and well-known personalities of the American Revolution. Many romanticized it as a "Golden Age" and de-emphasized its revolutionary character, especially in light of disturbing revolutionary events in France, Haiti, and Latin America. Others sought to interview aging survivors of the Revolution, even tracking down those who had fled to Canada or London. Three colonial participants from the attack on the Gaspee documented their memories of that night: Dr. John Mawney, the doctor who tended to the Lieutenant's wounds; Ephraim Bowen, who provided Joseph Bucklin with the firearm used to shoot the British lieutenant; and Aaron Biggs, an indentured servant who gave contemporary testimony that he was an eyewitness to the events of June 9–10, 1772.

The colonial government and Patriot press discredited his deposition. Bowen was only 19 in 1772, but later achieved the rank of Colonel and went on to run a successful rum distillery in Pawtuxet Village. In 1839 at age 86, Bowen attempted to recall the events of that night 67 years earlier. He was confident that all others involved in the attack were dead, and he named as many individuals as he could remember. Mawney's and Bowen's accounts are the only detailed eyewitness narratives from the colonial side. They tell that the men convened at Sabin's Tavern, John Brown organized a flotilla of eight boats, and Abraham Whipple identified himself to the Gaspee lookouts as the Sheriff of Kent County. From the Gaspee's crew and officers, there is ample testimony, but Rhode Island's Patriots left only scanty information.

== Pre–Civil War ==
Gaspee Point, pictured in 1852.

For four decades leading up to the American Civil War, Harlow Sheidley claims that Massachusetts’ conservative leaders published American histories that prominently featured New Englanders as the "true" founders of the American republic.

In 1845, Rhode Island Judge William R. Staples published the Documentary History of the Destruction of the Gaspee], first appearing in the Providence Daily Journal. His account later appeared as a substantial pamphlet. Staples's work contained 56 pages of contemporaneous correspondence surrounding the events of 1772–73.

Staples mostly let the historical actors speak for themselves. When his work was republished in 1990, Richard M. Deasy wrote an introduction reflecting on the Gaspee and the lasting contribution of Judge Staples’ compilation of documents. Deasy mentioned other maritime attacks on British government property as well as the Dockyards, &c. Protection Act 1772 (12 Geo. 3. c. 24) (see arson in royal dockyards), but he explained the reaction of the Crown to the Gaspee as "simply the proverbial straw that broke the camel's back."

Samuel G. Arnold produced a brief treatment of the Gaspee in 1860 in his History of the State of Rhode Island and Providence Plantations. He dedicated ten pages to the arrival of the Gaspee in Narragansett Bay, to early troubles with Dudingston, and to the destruction of the vessel, the Commission of Inquiry, and Ephraim Bowen's account of that night. Arnold celebrated the triumph of liberty over tyranny throughout the section on the American Revolution and described Lieutenant Dudingston's wounds as "the first British blood shed in the war of independence."

Secretary of State of Rhode Island John Russell Bartlett published Records of the Colony of Rhode Island and Providence Plantations in New England, a ten-volume set. Volume 7 covered the years 1770–1776, published in 1862. He covered the Gaspee, including a few additional pages of correspondence not found in Staples surrounding the destruction of the Gaspee. George Bancroft assisted Bartlett by securing copies of documents in London. Bartlett had published the same pages under the title A History of the Destruction of His Britannic Majesty’s Schooner Gaspee, in Narragansett Bay, on the 10th June, 1772.

== Imperial School ==
The period from 1865 to 1900 was a dry spell for historians writing about Rhode Island events leading up to the American War for Independence, although there was a significant body of work written on Massachusetts at the time.

Meanwhile, American historians were following in the footsteps of Jared Sparks (1789–1866) and George Bancroft (1800–1891) by visiting British archives to uncover the information that officials in London had at their disposal, and to discern how they made decisions that affected the American colonies. Their work became known as the "Imperial School" of historical interpretation, and it took into account both the reasonings of the Patriots and Loyalists in their actions alongside that of the British Parliament. George Louis Beer (1872–1920) and Herbert L. Osgood (1855–1918) examined the changes in mercantilist ideology among European theorists that influenced the decisions of the Privy Council in dealing with the American colonies.

After the French and Indian War, Britain returned some colonies in the Caribbean to the French but retained Canada, which marked a shift in colonial administration. Controlling, regulating, and collecting the revenues of colonial markets, the scholars explained, became divisive points of contention in the 1760s and the 1770s.

== Early 20th century and "progressive" interpretations ==
In the early 20th century, educational leaders expressed an interest in teaching Rhode Island school children about the Gaspee. According to historian Michael Kammen, the years between 1886 and 1906 marked a time of national "obsession with revolutionary America in juvenile fiction." Horatio B. Knox published a 98-page book on the Gaspee in 1908 "written expressly for the school children of Rhode Island."

Progressive historians in the early 20th century were interested in the economic motives of historical actors. They highlighted the ways in which large, corporate business interests were not always compatible with the interest of common people in a democracy. Arthur M. Schlesinger, Sr. and Charles and Mary Ritter Beard imposed their belief in the economic motivations of historical actors onto the larger demographic, geographic, and social changes in the colonies. According to these writers, the attack on the Gaspee was not motivated by Rhode Islanders finally taking a stand against an overbearing and over-stepping British Navy, but it was the merchants of Providence and Newport challenging the revenue enforcement of the London government. The merchants had numerous family and commercial ties to the colonial legislature and to the governor's office. America's revolutionary heroes, at the turn of the century, were more likely to be portrayed as statesmen and capable politicians, not revolutionaries or radicals.

In the years leading up to the Great Depression, Charles A. Beard and Mary R. Beard published and re-published their massive, 800-page Rise of American Civilization college textbook, they made only a one-sentence reference to the Gaspee but allotted five pages to the Boston Tea Party, even making analogies between trade privileges granted to the East India Company in the 18th century with those given to Standard Oil in the nineteenth. While many Americans may have been cynical about having to return to Europe to fight another war only two decades later in 1941, they quickly rallied to defend their belief in democracy and representative government. Not wanting to repeat the painful experiences following World War I, many Americans wanted to return to a postwar America that would be homogeneous and unified. Portrayals of the revolutionary period by historians reflected this cultural shift, and post-1945 historical writing emphasized the constructive nation-building done by thoughtful elites in the late 1780s and downplayed the fiery rhetoric of patriotic hotheads in the 1770s. That made the revolution seem not very "revolutionary" at all. Oliver M. Dickerson placed the blame for friction in the colonies not on the Navigation Acts, which he argued were functioning well by every assessment, but he accused the new Board of Customs Commissioners of acting like pirates. Dickerson portrayed the American colonies of the New World as prosperous, highly-desirable places to live. The founders must have been reluctant revolutionaries.

Gordon S. Wood, in his more recent highly acclaimed work on the radical transformation of colonial society, argued that the British Navigation Acts were working well. He believed that "compliance was remarkably high." The American colonists reinforced their support of Britain and the monarchical, hierarchical society in which they lived when they mobilized to assist their King during the outbreak of the French and Indian War in 1756. Royal authority was deeply rooted in the mid-18th century in the Thirteen Colonies of North America. While compliance may have been high in many areas, some Rhode Island merchants were not prepared for the type of rigid enforcement of revenue collection that followed the Seven Years' War.

While Dudingston's zealous enforcement of custom laws in 1772 may not have been politically popular in Narragansett Bay, Lawrence H. Gipson researched the technical legal grounds for it. He found that Dudingston was well within his jurisdiction to send property seized in Rhode Island to the Vice-Admiralty court in Boston. Gipson, part of the "Imperial School," covered the Gaspee incident in more detail in his massive 15-volume history than any other professional historian, devoting 14 pages to it. He found that Rhode Island's colonists erred in their assertions of legal impropriety. On the other hand, James B. Hedges, in his history of the Brown family, claimed the opposite. He indicated that an Act of Parliament required for seizures to stand trial in the colony in which they were apprehended. While both scholars disagreed on technical points, they were in agreement that law was king. Each side, they argued, was trying to promote a more accurate understanding of the relevant legislation.

Carl Ubbelohde maintained that the few cases in which Rhode Island business was adjudicated in Judge Robert Auchumuty's Boston courtroom were the exception, not the rule, in colonial Vice-Admiralty courts.

== Consensus "republican" interpretations ==
Edmund Morgan found that a "Puritan ethic" was still guiding many of New England's colonists in the 1760s and 1770s. In their nonimportation and nonconsumption rhetoric and in their attacks on luxury and idleness, colonists coalesced around a shared set of American values. Morgan tied the Boston Massacre and the Gaspee to the corrupt American Board of Customs Commissioners. Despite all the varieties and differences among the Patriot leadership, Morgan argued that they had a consensus at a more basic, world-view level. A frugal, hard-working, and virtuous people were not going to stand by while Britain imposed a nonproductive class of idle placeholders over them. Dickerson found the "corrupt class" to include some of the "King’s Friends," who personally profited from American ships, merchants, and seafarers through the American Board of Customs, causing significant harm to a century of successful Navigation Acts. Republican virtue, it seemed, would be the guiding principle for America's founders.

== Neo-Whig "ideological" interpretations ==
Not content to "flatten out" the complexity and nuances of the Revolutionary period, historians writing in the 1960s and 1970s rehabilitated, in one form or another, all of the previous "schools of thought." Whiggish, economic, imperial, and conflict views came back with a new vitality, new evidence, and a new perspective, perhaps colored by the protest movements and crowd action of 1960s America.

Colonial elites in the 18th century knew that mobs frequently served the public welfare and understood that they played an integral role in protecting a free society. Local uprisings were better defined as extra-institutional, rather than anti-institutional. They were focused and "disciplined" or at least proportional in the scale of their protests. Historian Pauline Maier built upon the earlier findings of George Rudé and E. P. Thompson in their research on 18th-century mob and crowd behavior in Britain. Rudé found that London mobs were not mere tools of elites, outside agents, or conspirators. They frequently acted with strong social and economic grievances and attacked the property of people they knew personally. They broke windows, "pulled down" houses, and sometimes burned their victims in effigy. Mobs usually acted and reacted near their homes. Thompson indicated that as more and more of the British economy came under the control of "unseen" market forces, the traditional "paternalistic" protectors of the economy were coming under scrutiny for not "protecting" people from these forces.

In the colonies, Maier noted that three kinds of uprisings pointing toward the revolution that have attracted attention from historians because they directly challenged British authority: restrictions on the use of white pine trees, naval impressments, and customs-related conflicts. The conflicts did not merely engage those on the periphery of American society (seafarers, Blacks, and servants), but colonial elites participated in these protests. Charles Dudley, the customs collector in Newport, was attacked in 1771 not by the "lowest class of Men" but by the merchants and shipmasters of the port. In 1772, members of the leading merchant family of Providence planned the attack on Dudingston and the Gaspee. In keeping with colonial patterns for local uprisings, the local sheriff immediately identified himself and claimed that he was carrying out his duties by seeking to arrest Dudingston. Some of the attackers may have blackened their faces, another trait of some colonial mobs.

Maier noted that the Brown's actions were carried out only as a last resort and after all legal means had failed. Rhode Island merchants and shipmasters had pressed their grievances during the spring of 1772 through civil and military channels to no avail. Uprisings were meant to show weaknesses in the government, "areas for improvement" in which laws needed enforcement. In the case of the Gaspee, the uprising was meant to show where enforcement had been excessive. The desired response from the Crown would have been to relax the enforcement of customs in a colony that depended so much upon navigation.

Dudingston was tried and convicted of illegal seizure in a Rhode Island court, and the customs board in Boston paid his fine. Maier's work revealed the function the colonial mob served in a society in which the government and police presence was small. Maier turned the idea of a "lawless" mob on its head and showed that a mob could take limited action in order to maintain law and order.

== Neo-Imperial interpretation ==
Several history professors and graduate students tried to understand, analyze, and interpret a British and American Loyalist perspective on the Gaspee. Franklin Wickwire wrote an article in 1963 that examined the British perspective on the Gaspee more thoroughly than anyone before or since. He examined the transition from Lord Hillsborough to Lord Dartmouth as Secretary of State for the Colonies in 1772. Dartmouth was not as experienced in colonial affairs as Hillsborough and relied heavily on one of his under-secretaries, John Pownall, the younger brother of colonial governor of Massachusetts Thomas Pownall. By 1772, Pownall had 30 years of experience with American colonial affairs. Dartmouth and later Lord North relied on Pownall to the point that he was not merely carrying out administrative duties but was writing policy for the colonies. From humble beginnings, Pownall had risen to the high councils of the British government that ultimately brought about the undoing of the first British Empire.

When the Privy Council ordered the attorney and solicitor general to draft the commission and the King's proclamation for the Gaspee, Dartmouth left for his country home, assigning the duties to Pownall, who wrote much of the copy, forwarding important documents to Dartmouth merely for his signature. Wickwire's view of the Gaspee incident showed a British ministry in which important directives and orders were delegated to subministers. They were dedicated and competent administrators but had little knowledge about what was actually happening "on the ground" in the American colonies. Most had never visited the Eastern Seaboard of North America and were not in a good position to judge how their directives were going to be received on the other side of the Atlantic. While John Pownall certainly understood the political culture of the colonies better than many of his superiors, London's officials repeatedly failed to anticipate policy implications and outcome.

== Neo-Progressives and "radical" interpretations ==
This same time period saw a resurgence of scholarship that was loosely defined as "neo-progressive" or "radical" history. Alfred F. Young, in an introduction to a collection of essays by self-styled radical historians, distinguished between "internal radicals" and "external radicals." The most pro-Independence in the years up to 1776 were radical because of their unwillingness to work within the colonial system. Apart from independence, they were not seeking drastic changes to the social order. Internal radicals, sometimes known to contemporaries as "levellers," may or may not have been interested in Patriot grievances against the ministry. They sought a reordering of colonial hierarchies that would allow the "outsiders" in. Jesse Lemisch portrayed sailors as the quintessential "outsiders." While they were not interested in the reordering of society, like black slaves an indentured servants, they were treated like children by the civil codes of the Thirteen Colonies. Lemisch argued that impressment of sailors, especially the capture of colonial citizens who were not mariners, was a key grievance understated by previous authors. The naval impressment by the authorities swayed many Americans to the cause of independence.

One of only two book-length scholarly treatments of the Gaspee was a Ph.D. thesis by Lawrence J. DeVaro. Writing most of his chapters in the early 1970s, he was heavily influenced by Bernard Bailyn's The Ideological Origins of the American Revolution. DeVaro argued that the Gaspee had a greater impact in Britain than in America. Where Patriots saw Crown actions as a conspiracy to subvert their court system and trial in the vicinage, ministry officials saw the attack on the Gaspee as a conspiracy to weaken royal authority in New England. Previous attacks, even ones in Rhode Island, were not considered treason. While some rewards had been posted in the past for information leading to an arrest, none was followed by a Royal Commission, unlike the Gaspee. Exaggerated and erroneous reports were taken to London that overestimated the number of participants, the seriousness of Dudingston's wounds, and misidentified the location of the attack. The reports made it difficult for the commission to execute its duties properly. Even as it went about its inquiry, local residents overestimated the power delegated to the commissioners. The historian David Lovejoy, using the Newport Mercury, showed how many residents in Providence and Newport were expecting the worst possible outcome from the commission. The Newport pastor Ezra Stiles, indicated to Reverend Elihu Spencer that "no one justifies the burning of the Gaspee. But none ever thought of such a Thing as being Treason."

Historian Joey La Neve DeFrancesco argues that the Gaspee Affair resulted from the desire of the colonial elite in Rhode Island to protect their involvement in the triangular slave trade, which formed the backbone of the colony's economy. He noted that the Intolerable Acts severely affected the ability for Rhode Island merchants, many of whom participated in the attack on the Gaspee, to profit from slavery and the industries which were dependent on the slave trade, such as the rum and molasses trades. DeFrancesco writes that the colonists' "supposed fight for liberty was in fact a fight for the freedom to profit from the business of slavery", and claimed that celebrations of the incident in Rhode Island represent "New England’s historical amnesia on slavery."
