= Last Gasp =

(The) Last Gasp may refer to

- Last Gasp (publisher), a San Francisco–based book publisher
- "Last Gasp" (Inside No. 9), a TV episode
- The Last Gasp, a 2007 album by Impaled
- The Last Gasp (novel), a 1983 novel by Trevor Hoyle
- "Last Gasp", a song by Holly Herndon from the album Proto
- Synonym for dying gasp feature in telecommunications
