= List of shipwrecks in 1772 =

The List of shipwrecks in 1772 includes some ships sunk, wrecked or otherwise lost during 1772.

table of contents
1772
Jan	Feb	Mar	Apr
May	Jun	Jul	Aug
Sep	Oct	Nov	Dec
Unknown date

== January ==
=== 1 January ===
List of shipwrecks: 1 January 1772
Ship	State	Description
Antwerp	Great Britain	The packet boat was wrecked on the Goodwin Sands, Kent. Her crew were rescued.

=== 2 January ===
List of shipwrecks: 2 January 1772
Ship	State	Description
Intelligence	Great Britain	African slave trade: The ship was lost at Cap-Français, Saint-Domingue with the loss of 21 slaves.

=== 9 January ===
List of shipwrecks: 9 January 1772
Ship	State	Description
Scholtenburg	Dutch East India Company	The East Indiaman, a frigate, was lost off "Infiegoene" whilst bound for Ceylon.

=== 20 January ===
List of shipwrecks: 20 January 1772
Ship	State	Description
Polly	Great Britain	The ship ran aground at Beaumaris, Anglesey and was severely damaged. She was on a voyage from London to Liverpool, Lancashire.

=== 31 January ===
List of shipwrecks: 31 January 1772
Ship	State	Description
Friends-goodwill	Great Britain	The ship foundered in the English Channel off Portland, Dorset with the loss of a crew member. Survivors were rescued by a French fishing vessel. She was on a voyage from Plymouth, Devon to London.

=== Unknown date ===
List of shipwrecks: Unknown date 1772
Ship	State	Description
Ann	Ireland	The ship could have been lost near La Rochelle, France. She was on a voyage from Cork to Nantes, France.
Aquitaine	France	The East Indiaman sank in the Garonne.
Britannia	Great Britain	The ship was driven ashore near Aldborough, Yorkshire. She was on a voyage from Hull, Yorkshire to Porto, Portugal.
Friendship	Ireland	The ship could have been lost in the Orkney Islands, Great Britain. She was on a voyage from Rotterdam, Dutch Republic to Belfast.
Haywood	Great Britain	The ship was blown out to sea from São Miguel Island, Azores in late January. No further trace, presumed foundered with the loss of all hands.
Joseph	Great Britain	The ship's location was lost near Cádiz, Spain.
Lady Mary	Great Britain	The ship was driven ashore and wrecked at Formby, Lancashire with the loss of three of her crew. She was on a voyage from Workington, Cumberland to Cork.
Nancy	Great Britain	The ship was driven ashore 2 nautical miles (3.7 km) west of Hythe, Kent. She was on a voyage from South Carolina, British America to London.
Nancy	Great Britain	The ship was driven ashore near Tinmouth, Devon. She was on a voyage from Seville, Spain to London.
Swallow	(Kingdom of Great Britain) Jersey	The ship foundered with some loss of life. She was on a voyage from Jersey to St. Ubes, Portugal.

== February ==
=== 11 February ===
List of shipwrecks: 11 February 1772
Ship	State	Description
Polly	Ireland	The ship was driven ashore at Belfast, County Antrim. She was on a voyage from Philadelphia, Pennsylvania, British America to Belfast.

=== Unknown date ===
List of shipwrecks: Unknown date 1772
Ship	State	Description
Francis & Maria	(Kingdom of Great Britain) Guernsey	The ship was lost whilst on a voyage from Rochfort, France to Guernsey. Her crew were rescued.
Mogdort	Great Britain	The ship was driven ashore at "Cowell", Argyllshire. She was on a voyage from Saint John Island to Glasgow, Renfrewshire.
St. Michael	(Denmark) Norway	The ship ran aground in the North Sea off Great Yarmouth, Norfolk, Great Britain. She was on a voyage from Arundale to Waterford, Ireland.

== March ==
=== Unknown date ===
List of shipwrecks: Unknown date 1772
Ship	State	Description
Carolina	Great Britain	The ship ran aground on The Shingles, Isle of Wight. She was on a voyage from North Carolina, British America to London.
James	Ireland	The ship was driven ashore in Cales Bay near "Batty". She was on a voyage from Waterford to Cales.
Jane	Ireland	The ship was run down in the River Thames by a British ship and was beached. She was on a voyage from Cork to London.
Mercury	France	The ship was driven ashore in Cales Bay. She was on a voyage from Barcelona, Spain to Havre de Grâce.

== April ==
=== Unknown date ===
List of shipwrecks: Unknown date 1772
Ship	State	Description
Active	Great Britain	The ship was driven ashore and wrecked near Royan, France.
Apollo	Great Britain	The ship was driven ashore in the Baltic Sea.
Collin	Great Britain	The ship was driven ashore on Amrum, Duchy of Holstein. She was on a voyage from the Firth of Forth to Hamburg.
Endeavour	Great Britain	The ship was driven ashore and wrecked on the south coast of the Isle of Wight. She was on a voyage from Liverpool, Lancashire to Hull, Yorkshire.
Medway	Great Britain	The ship was lost near Zierikzee, Dutch Republic. She was on a voyage from Hull to Rotterdam, Dutch Republic.
Neptune	Great Britain	The ship foundered in the Baltic Sea. She was on a voyage from Königsburg, Prussia to Amsterdam, Dutch Republic.

== May ==
=== 4 May ===
List of shipwrecks: 4 May 1772
Ship	State	Description
Sally	(Kingdom of Great Britain) British America	The sloop was wrecked on the Cape Lookout Shoals, 10 leagues (30 nautical miles (56 km) off the coast of North Carolina with the loss of seven of the 22 people on board. She was on a voyage from New York to Charles Town, South Carolina.

=== Unknown date ===
List of shipwrecks: Unknown date 1772
Ship	State	Description
Empress of Russia	Great Britain	The ship foundered in the Baltic Sea. She was on a voyage from Liverpool, Lancashire to Danzig.
Generous Friends	Great Britain	The ship foundered off the Whiting sandbank, in the North Sea off the coast of Suffolk She was on a voyage from Saint Petersburg, Russia to London.
Generous-planter	Great Britain	The collier was wrecked on the Barr sandbank, in the North Sea off South Shields, County Durham.
Lucretia	Hamburg	The ship was driven ashore and wrecked near Weymouth, Dorset, Great Britain. She was on a voyage from Genoa to Hamburg.
Old Batchelor	Great Britain	The ship was lost off Moggadore, Morocco.
Rose	Great Britain	The ship was driven ashore and wrecked near Aldeburgh, Suffolk. She was on a voyage from Porto, Portugal to Great Yarmouth, Norfolk.
York	Great Britain	The ship was lost between Gibraltar and Málaga, Spain. She was on a voyage from Genoa to Hamburg.

== June ==
=== 9 June ===
List of shipwrecks: 9 June 1772
Ship	State	Description
HMS Gaspée	(Kingdom of Great Britain) Royal Navy	HMS Gaspée. Gaspée Affair: The schooner ran aground in the Providence River, Rhode Island, British America whilst chasing Hannah. She was captured by the Sons of Liberty, burnt and sunk.

=== Unknown date ===
List of shipwrecks: Unknown date 1772
Ship	State	Description
Charlotte	Dutch Republic	The ship was driven ashore on Texell. She was on a voyage from Mogadore, Morocco to Amsterdam.
Hambleton	Great Britain	The ship was driven ashore and wrecked on the Dutch coast. She was on a voyage from Sint Eustatius to Amsterdam.

== July ==
=== 26 July ===
List of shipwrecks: 26 July 1772
Ship	State	Description
Dule of Albany	British East India Company	The East Indiaman was wrecked on the Long Sand, in the Bengal River.

=== Unknown date ===
List of shipwrecks: Unknown date 1772
Ship	State	Description
Generous Friends	Great Britain	The ship ran aground in the River Thames and was wrecked. She was on a voyage from Montserrat to London.
Goodintent	Great Britain	The ship ran aground in the River Thames at Blackwall, Middlesex and capsized. She was on a voyage from London to Newcastle upon Tyne, Northumberland.
Maria Beckford	Great Britain	The ship was driven ashore on the coast of Florida, British America.
Molly	Great Britain	The ship foundered in the Skaggerak off Skagen, Denmark with the loss of four of her crew.

== August ==
=== 5 August ===
List of shipwrecks: 5 August 1772
Ship	State	Description
Eagle	Great Britain	The ship was destroyed by fire in the River Thames.

=== 9 August ===
List of shipwrecks: 9 August 1772
Ship	State	Description
Swan	Great Britain	The ship was run onto by a collier at the Kentish Knock and foundered with the loss of a crew member. Survivors were rescued by a third vessel.

=== 16 August ===
List of shipwrecks: 16 August 1772
Ship	State	Description
Meredith	Great Britain	The ship was driven ashore and wrecked on Watlant Island, Bahamas. Her crew were rescued by Royal Charlotte (Great Britain). Meredith was on a voyage from Jamaica to London.

=== 28 August ===
List of shipwrecks: 28 August 1772
Ship	State	Description
Fanny	(Kingdom of Great Britain) Nevis	The sloop was wrecked at the Salt Ponds, Saint Kitts.
John	(Kingdom of Great Britain) Virgin Islands	The sloop was wrecked at Sandy Point, Saint Kitts.
Juno	(Kingdom of Great Britain) Saint Kitts	The sloop was lost at the Salt Ponds, Saint Kitts.
Mary and Elizabeth	(Kingdom of Great Britain)	The schooner was wrecked at Sandy Point, Saint Kitts.
Pompey	(Dutch Republic) Saint Martin	The sloop was wrecked in Frigate Bay, Saint Kitts.
Watson	Great Britain	The sloop was driven ashore and wrecked at Basseterre, Saint Kitts.

=== 31 August ===
List of shipwrecks: 31 August 1772
Ship	State	Description
Apollo	(Kingdom of Great Britain) British America	The ship was wrecked in a hurricane at Deep Bay, Saint Kitts with the loss of all but one of her crew.
Blake	(Kingdom of Great Britain) Antigua	The sloop was wrecked in a hurricane at Deep Bay, Saint Kitts. Her crew were rescued.
Chatham	(Kingdom of Great Britain) Saint Kitts	The schooner was wrecked in a hurricane at Sandy Point, Saint Kitts.
Experiment	(Kingdom of Great Britain) Saint Kitts	The schooner was wrecked in a hurricane at Saint Kitts.
Farley	Great Britain	The ship was driven ashore and wrecked in a hurricane at Bloody Point, Saint Kitts. Her crew were rescued.
Fortune	(Kingdom of Great Britain) Saint Kitts	The brig was wrecked in a hurricane at Nevis.
Hazard	(Kingdom of Great Britain) Saint Kitts	The schooner was wrecked in a hurricane at Hart's Bay, Saint Kitts.
Irish Gimblet	(Kingdom of Great Britain)	The sloop was wrecked in a hurricane at Nevis with the loss of all hands.
Jenny	(Kingdom of Great Britain) Nevis	The sloop was wrecked in a hurricane at Nevis with the loss of all hands.
John and Elizabeth	(Kingdom of Great Britain) British America	The sloop was wrecked in a hurricane at Sandy Point, Saint Kitts.
Isidure	Ireland	The brig was wrecked in a hurricane at Deep Bay, Saint Kitts.
Margaretti	(Kingdom of Great Britain)	The schooner was wrecked in a hurricane at Saint Kitts.
Mercury	Great Britain	The brig was wrecked in a hurricane at Saint Kitts.
Mercury	(Kingdom of Great Britain) saint Kitts	The schooner was wrecked in a hurricane at Saint Kitts.
New York	(Kingdom of Great Britain) British America	The ship was wrecked in a hurricane at Basseterre, Saint Kitts.
Relief	(Kingdom of Great Britain) Virgin Islands	The schooner was wrecked in a hurricane at saint Kitts.
Thistle	Great Britain	The snow was wrecked in a hurricane at Limeh Bay, Saint Kitts.
Tryon	(Kingdom of Great Britain) British America	The brig foundered in a hurricane off Saint Kitts with the loss of all but one of her crew.
Two Williams	(Kingdom of Great Britain)	The sloop was wrecked in a hurricane at Antigua with the loss of all hands.

=== Unknown date ===
List of shipwrecks: Unknown date 1772
Ship	State	Description
Norra Fizland	Sweden	The ship was wrecked on the Goodwin Sands, Kent, Great Britain with the loss of four of her crew. She was on a voyage from Cagliari, Sardinia to Stockholm.
St. Peter	Great Britain	The ship foundered in the Atlantic Ocean off Cádiz, Spain.

== September ==
=== 1 September ===
List of shipwrecks: 1 September 1772
Ship	State	Description
Charles	(Kingdom of Great Britain) Jamaica	The brig foundered whilst on a voyage from Georgia to New York, British America.

=== 5 September ===
List of shipwrecks: 5 September 1772
Ship	State	Description
Jenny	Great Britain	The ship was wrecked on the Northern Triangles. She was on a voyage from British Honduras to Glasgow, Renfrewshire.
Mary	Great Britain	The ship was wrecked on the Northern Triangles. She was on a voyage from British Honduras to New York, British America.

=== 24 September ===
List of shipwrecks: 24 September 1772
Ship	State	Description
Chanteloupe	Great Britain	The ship was driven ashore at Thurlestone Rock. She was bound for London from Grenada, laden with sugar, coffee and rum. Of the crew of 13 and seven passengers, only the second mate was rescued.
Phœnix	France	The ship was driven ashore in the Cattewater. She was on a voyage from Havre de Grâce to Martinique.

=== 25 September ===
List of shipwrecks: 25 September 1772
Ship	State	Description
Catharine	(Denmark) Norway	The ship foundered in the English Channel off Portland, Dorset, Great Britain with the loss of four of her twelve crew. Survivors were rescued by Quebeck (Great Britain). Catharine was bound for Dublin, Ireland.
Princess of Wales	Ireland	The ship was lost on the Arklow Banks, in the Irish Sea off the coast of County Wicklow. She was on a voyage from Maryland, British America to Dublin.

=== Unknown date ===
List of shipwrecks: Unknown date 1772
Ship	State	Description
Chantelope	Great Britain	The ship was driven ashore and wrecked at Kingsgate, Devon with the loss of all but one of her crew. She was on a voyage from Grenades to London.
Charlottee	Great Britain	The ship was driven ashore near Ramsgate, Kent. She was later refloated and taken in to the River Thames, where she capsized. Charlottee was on a voyage from Narva, Russia to Chester, Cheshire.
Unnamed	Imperial Russian Navy	The ship departed from Caffa for Kertch. No further trace, presumed foundered with the loss of all hands.
Helena	Great Britain	The ship was driven ashore and wrecked on Bornholm, Denmark. She was on a voyage from Stockholm, Sweden to London.
Mary & Elizabeth	Great Britain	The ship ran aground in the River Thames at Pitcher's Point and was wrecked. She was on a voyage from Jamaica to London.
Rose	Great Britain	The ship foundered in the Irish Sea off Milford, Pembrokeshire. She was on a voyage from Bristol to Bordeaux, France.
True Briton	Great Britain	The ship was driven ashore on the coast of Norway.

== October ==
=== 2 October ===
List of shipwrecks: 2 October 1772
Ship	State	Description
Pretty Polly	Great Britain	The ship ran aground on the North Sand, in Liverpool Bay. All on board were rescued.

=== 29 October ===
List of shipwrecks: 29 October 1772
Ship	State	Description
Good-intent	Ireland	The ship foundered in Carmarthen Bay. She was on a voyage from Dublin to Havre de Grâce, France.

=== Unknown date ===
List of shipwrecks: Unknown date 1772
Ship	State	Description
Good-intent	Great Britain	The ship was driven ashore and wrecked at Hunstanton, Norfolk.
Hopewell	Great Britain	The ship was wrecked on the Welsh Hook, in the Bristol Channel with the loss of five lives. She was on a voyage from Waterford, Kingdom of Ireland to Bristol, Gloucestershire.
Le Liberti	Danzig	The ship capsized in the English Channel off Shoreham-by-Sea, Sussex, Kingdom of Great Britain. She was on a voyage from Danzig to Dundalk, Ireland.
Mary & Ann	Great Britain	The ship was lost whilst on a voyage from London to Cork, Ireland.
Nancy & Peggy	Ireland	The ship was driven ashore and wrecked on the Irish coast. She was on a voyage from Liverpool, Lancashire, Great Britain to Ballyshannon, County Donegal.
Shuldrum	Great Britain	The ship departed from Newfoundland in late October for Pool. No further trace, presumed foundered in the Atlantic Ocean with the loss of all hands.

== November ==
=== 1 November ===
List of shipwrecks: 1 November 1772
Ship	State	Description
Francis & Elizabeth	Ireland	The ship foundered in Clognakitty-bay. Her crew were rescued. She was on a voyage from Lisbon, Portugal to Dublin.

=== 10 November ===
List of shipwrecks: 10 November 1772
Ship	State	Description
Carolina	Great Britain	The ship was lost in Mount's Bay. She was on a voyage from Maryland, British America to London.
Sally	Great Britain	The ship foundered in the English Channel off St Alban's Head, Dorset with the loss of all but one of her crew. She was on a voyage from Figueira da Foz, Portugal to Pool, Dorset.

=== 17 November ===
List of shipwrecks: 17 November 1772
Ship	State	Description
Dispatch	Great Britain	The ship sprang a leak and foundered in the Atlantic Ocean off Land's End, Cornwall. Her crew survived. She was on a voyage from London to Dublin, Ireland.
Trotman	Great Britain	The ship was driven ashore and wrecked at Brunt Head. Her crew were rescued. She was on a voyage from London to Bristol, Gloucestershire.

=== 18 November ===
List of shipwrecks: 18 November 1772
Ship	State	Description
Fortune	Great Britain	The ship was wrecked on the coast of Florida, British America with the loss of two of her crew. She was on a voyage from Jamaica to London.

=== 21 November ===
List of shipwrecks: 21 November 1772
Ship	State	Description
Fenny	Great Britain	The ship foundered in Bude Bay with the loss of all hands. She was on a voyage from London to Bristol, Gloucestershire.
Goodintent	Great Britain	The ship was lost with all hands. She was on a voyage from London to Liverpool, Lancashire.
May	Great Britain	The ship was driven ashore and wrecked at Orford, Suffolk with the loss of all but two of her crew. She was on a voyage from Stockholm to Dublin, Ireland.
Papp-castle	Great Britain	The ship was lost off Liverpool with the loss of all hands.

=== 26 November ===
List of shipwrecks: 26 November 1772
Ship	State	Description
Grenada	Great Britain	The gally was driven ashore at Dublin, Ireland and was severely damaged.
Le Vigilent	France	The ship was wrecked on the coast of Brittany.

=== 29 November ===
List of shipwrecks: 29 November 1772
Ship	State	Description
Harriot	Great Britain	The ship was driven ashore at Falmouth, Cornwall. She was on a voyage from Nice, France to London.

=== Unknown date ===
List of shipwrecks: Unknown date 1772
Ship	State	Description
Antigua Frigate	Great Britain	The ship foundered in the Mediterranean Sea off Catania, Sicily. Her crew were rescued.
Betty	Great Britain	The ship was driven ashore in Swansey Bay. She was on a voyage from Riga, Russia to Swansey, Glamorgan.
Brotherly Love	Great Britain	The ship foundered in the English Channel 2 leagues (6 nautical miles (11 km) east of Dungeness, Kent. Her crew were rescued. She was on a voyage from London to Ostend, Dutch Republic.
Campo Bello	Great Britain	The ship was driven ashore in Cardigan Bay. She was on a voyage from Campobello to Liverpool, Lancashire.
Cruiser	Great Britain	The ship was wrecked in Padstow Bay, Cornwall before 28 November. She was on a voyage from North Carolina, British America to Bristol, Gloucestershire.
Dispatch	Great Britain	The ship was lost with all hands. She was on a voyage from London to Liverpool.
Eendraught Sitse	Dutch Republic	The ship was lost whilst on a voyage from Amsterdam to Alicante, Spain.
Fly	Great Britain	The ship departed from the Clyde for Dunkirk, France. No further trace, presumed foundered with the loss of all hands.
Friends	Great Britain	The ship foundered in Carnarvon Bay. Her crew were rescued.
Hawke	Great Britain	The ship foundered in the Sound of Mull. She was on a voyage from Riga to Liverpool.
Helena La Clare Tax Kirk	France	The ship was driven ashore at Brighthelmstone, Sussex, Great Britain. She was on a voyage from Bordeaux to Amsterdam, Dutch Republic.
Industry	Great Britain	The ship foundered in the Atlantic Ocean off the Cape Verde Islands. She was on a voyage from Liverpool to Africa.
Jolly Bacchus	Great Britain	The ship foundered in the English Channel off Dungeness with the loss of all but one of her crew. She was on a voyage from Jamaica to London.
Leopard	Great Britain	The ship was driven ashore and wrecked at Whitlock, Cumberland. She was on a voyage from Whitehaven, Cumberland to Jamaica.
Liberatas	Sweden	The ship was wrecked on the Welsh coast. She was on a voyage from Stockholm to Dublin.
Newnham	Great Britain	The ship was driven ashore and wrecked on Flat Holm, in the Bristol Channel. She was on a voyage from London to Newnham-on-Severn, Gloucestershire.
Thomas & Mary	Great Britain	The ship was wrecked on the Shipwash Sand, in the North Sea off the coast of Suffolk. Her crew were rescued.
Venus	Great Britain	The ship was driven ashore and severely damaged at Padstow, Cornwall. She was later refloated.
William & Ann	Great Britain	The ship struck the Ionion and was consequently beached at Dungeness. She was on a voyage from Danzig to Chatham, Kent.
Willing-mind	Great Britain	The ship was driven ashore near Barmouth, Merionethshire. She was on a voyage from Liverpool to Bristol, Gloucestershire.

== December ==
=== 2 December ===
List of shipwrecks: 2 December 1772
Ship	State	Description
Lady Margaret	Bremen	The ship was driven ashore and wrecked at Blakeney, Norfolk, Great Britain. Her crew were rescued. She was on a voyage from Bremen to Bordeaux, France.

=== 3 December ===
List of shipwrecks: 3 December 1772
Ship	State	Description
Sea Nymph	Great Britain	The ship foundered off St. Lucar, Spain. She was on a voyage from Newfoundland, British America to Calais, France.

=== 8 December ===
List of shipwrecks: 8 December 1772
Ship	State	Description
Carlisle	(Kingdom of Great Britain) British America	The ship was wrecked at Malamocco, Republic of Venice. She was on a voyage from Falmouth, Cornwall, Great Britain to Venice.

=== 12 December ===
List of shipwrecks: 12 December 1772
Ship	State	Description
Bacchus	Great Britain	The ship was driven ashore and wrecked near Dover, Kent. Her crew survived. She was on a voyage from Lime, Dorset to Harwich, Essex.

=== 15 December ===
List of shipwrecks: 15 December 1772
Ship	State	Description
Jenny	Great Britain	The ship was wrecked on the Goodwin Sands, Kent. She was on a voyage from South Shields, County Durham to Pool, Dorset.

=== 19 December ===
List of shipwrecks: 19 December 1772
Ship	State	Description
Phenix	Great Britain	The ship was wrecked on the Matchapungo Shoals, off the coast of Virginia, British America. Her crew were rescued.

=== 25 December ===
List of shipwrecks: 25 December 1772
Ship	State	Description
Acteon	Great Britain	The ship was lost near Londonderry, Ireland. She was on a voyage from London to British Honduras.

=== Unknown date ===
List of shipwrecks: Unknown date 1772
Ship	State	Description
Assumption	France	The ship was lost at Guernsey, Channel Islands. She was on a voyage from Guadeloupe to Havre de Grâce.
Bacchus	Ireland	The ship was lost at the mouth of the Garonne. She was on a voyage from Cork to Bordeaux, France.
Dingley	Great Britain	The ship was reported to have been lost at a Norwegian port. She was on a voyage from Saint Petersburg, Russia to London. She was later taken in to Christiansand.
Elizabeth & Mary	Great Britain	The ship was wrecked on the Welsh coast with the loss of all hands. She was on a voyage from Cork, Ireland to Bristol, Gloucestershire.
Hero	Great Britain	The ship was driven ashore at Waterford, Ireland.
Industry	Great Britain	The ship was wrecked on the coast of Norway with some loss of life. She was on a voyage from London to Gothenburg, Sweden.
Integrity	Great Britain	The ship ran aground in the River Avon and was severely damaged. She was on a voyage from Bristol, Gloucestershire to London.
John & Elizabeth	Great Britain	The ship was driven ashore and wrecked on the coast of Jutland with the loss of all but three of her crew. She was on a voyage from Exeter, Devon to Hamburg.
Molly	Great Britain	The packet boat foundered off the Isle of Man. She was on a voyage from Liverpool, Lancashire to Dublin, Ireland.
Philadelphia	(Kingdom of Great Britain) British America	The ship was driven ashore at Youghall, County Cork, Ireland.
Sally	Great Britain	The ship foundered in the Atlantic Ocean off Cape Finisterre, Spain. She was on a voyage from Cádiz to Ferrol, Spain.
Venice Paquet	(Denmark) Norway	The ship was lost at Venice. She was on a voyage from Bergen to Venice.

== Unknown date ==
List of shipwrecks: Unknown date 1772
Ship	State	Description
Barbadoes	Great Britain	The ship was destroyed by fire at Barbados.
Betsey	Great Britain	The ship was wrecked in the Otterock River, North Carolina, British America before 29 July.
Beum Consego	flag unknown	The ship was driven ashore and wrecked on Anguilla.
Britannia	Great Britain	The ship was driven ashore at Gallipoli, Ottoman Empire and was severely damaged, She was later refloated and taken in to Constantinople.
Bretagne	Great Britain	The East Indiaman was driven ashore and wrecked on the Isle of May in the West Indies. Twelve of her crew were rescued.
Charlotte	Great Britain	The ship was wrecked on the coast of Africa.
Charming Polly	Great Britain	The ship was driven ashore and wrecked on the coast of Carolina, British America. She was on a voyage from London to Georgia, British America.
Cunriff	Great Britain	The ship was wrecked on a reef off Barbados. She was on a voyage from London and Cork, Ireland to Antigua and Jamaica
HMS Dispatch	(Kingdom of Great Britain) Royal Navy	The Sloop-of-War foundered in a hurricane. Her crew were rescued by another Royal Navy vessel.
Duke of Albany	Great Britain	The ship was lost in the Bengal River.
Ebenezar	Denmark	The ship foundered whilst on a voyage from Copenhagen to St. Croix.
Elizabeth	Ireland	The ship foundered in the Atlantic Ocean before 9 June. Her crew were rescued by Mary (Great Britain). Elizabeth was on a voyage from Dublin to North Carolina.
Elizabeth	Great Britain	The ship was driven ashore and wrecked on Condea Island. She was on a voyage from Livorno, Grand Duchy of Tuscany to Alexandria, Egypt.
Emanuel	Denmark	The ship foundered whilst on a voyage from Copenhagen to St. Croix.
London	Great Britain	The ship foundered in the Atlantic Ocean off Rhode Island, British America. She was on a voyage from Rhode Island to London.
Hazard	Great Britain	The whaler foundered off the coast of Greenland.
Liberty	Great Britain	The ship was lost in the West Indies. She was on a voyage from Virginia, British America to Barbados.
Lydia	Great Britain	The ship foundered in the Atlantic Ocean off Boston, Massachusetts, British America. She was on a voyage from London to Boston.
Nimrod	Great Britain	The ship foundered in the Grand Banks of Newfoundland. She was on a voyage from Bristol, Gloucestershire to Newfoundland, British America.
Pitt	Great Britain	The ship was wrecked in a hurricane at Dominica.
Porpoise	Great Britain	The whaler was sunk by an iceberg off the coast of Greenland.
Prussian	Great Britain	The ship was driven ashore on Anguilla.
Rebello	Portugal	The ship foundered in the Atlantic Ocean off Bahia, Brazil. She was on a voyage from São Miguel Island, Azores to Bahia.
St Augustine	Great Britain	The ship was driven ashore and wrecked on the coast of Africa.
Young	Great Britain	The ship was wrecked on The Cockles. She was on a voyage from Virginia to Jamaica.
