= Gasp (disambiguation) =

A gasp is a paralinguistic respiration in the form of a sudden and sharp inhalation of air through the mouth.

Gasp may also refer to:

- Gasp (2009 film) (气喘吁吁), a Chinese film
- Gasp! (2010 TV series), an Australian TV series.
- Gasp (2012 film), a short German drama film
- G.A.S.P!! Fighters' NEXTream, a fighting game for the Nintendo 64
- "Gasp (Harper's Island)", a 2008–2009 TV-series episode
- GASP, a human gene
- Gasp., taxonomic author abbreviation of Guglielmo Gasparrini (1803–1866), Italian botanist and mycologist
- Gdańsk Autonomous Elementary School (Gdańska Autonomiczna Szkoła Podstawowa), an elementary school in Gdańsk
- Glenorchy Art and Sculpture Park (GASP), a sculpture park and boardwalk in Hobart, Tasmania, Australia
- Group Against Smog and Pollution (GASP), popular acronym of environmentalist groups, e.g. Michelle Madoff
- Guilt and Shame Proneness Scale (GASP)

== See also ==
- Gaspé (disambiguation), including Gaspee, Gaspesie
- Gaspar (disambiguation)
- Gasper (disambiguation)
- Agonal respiration
- Apneustic respirations
- Asthma
- Dying gasp
- Sleep apnea
