= William Duddingston =

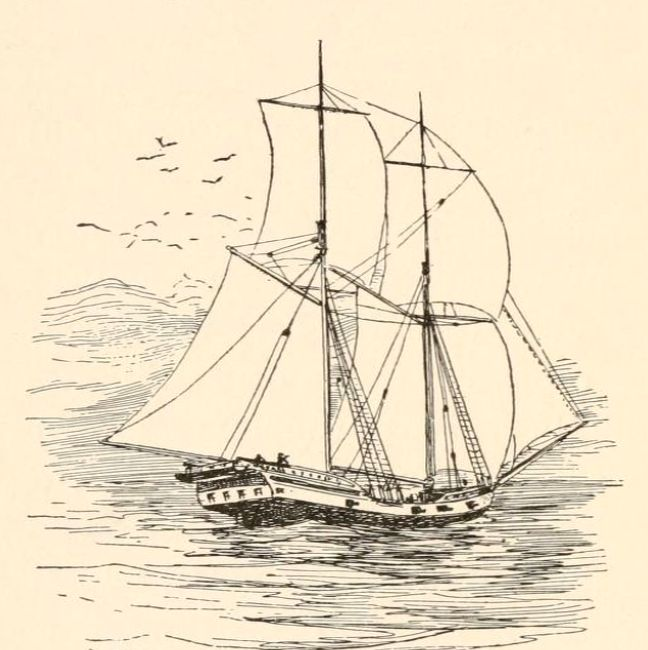
HMS Gaspee Commanded by W. Duddingston

Rear-Admiral William Duddingston (November 1740 – 27 October 1817) was an 18th-century Scottish commander in the Royal Navy of the schooner HMS Gaspee, famed for its destruction in the Gaspee Affair, one of the precursors to the American War of Independence.He was captured and taken prisoner just before the vessel was destroyed by the various rebels, including the Sons of Liberty.

== Early life and family ==
He was born in November 1740 in the parish of Kilconquhar in the East Neuk of Fife, the third son of 14 children to James Duddingston (1695-1768) and his wife Margaret Gillespie. The family lived at St Ford (or Sandford) just south-west of Kilconquhar.

On 17 November 1802 he married Antonia Steuart in Elie Parish Church, just south of Kilconquhar.

They had two sons and two daughters: Elizabeth Hay Duddingston (1803–1866) died in Geneva; one son who died unnamed within hours of birth in 1804; William Montague Duddingston (1806–1824); and Susan Stirling Duddingston (1807–1890) died in Paris. His wife died in 1839 at their Edinburgh home, 4 Heriot Row.

Duddington was uncle to Robert Heriot Barclay and encouraged and aided his naval career. From 1752 to 1755 he served as a merchant seaman on the Fife coast in Scotland. He appears as a Royal Navy lieutenant in 1759, but was possibly a midshipman from 1755 to 1759.

== Naval life ==
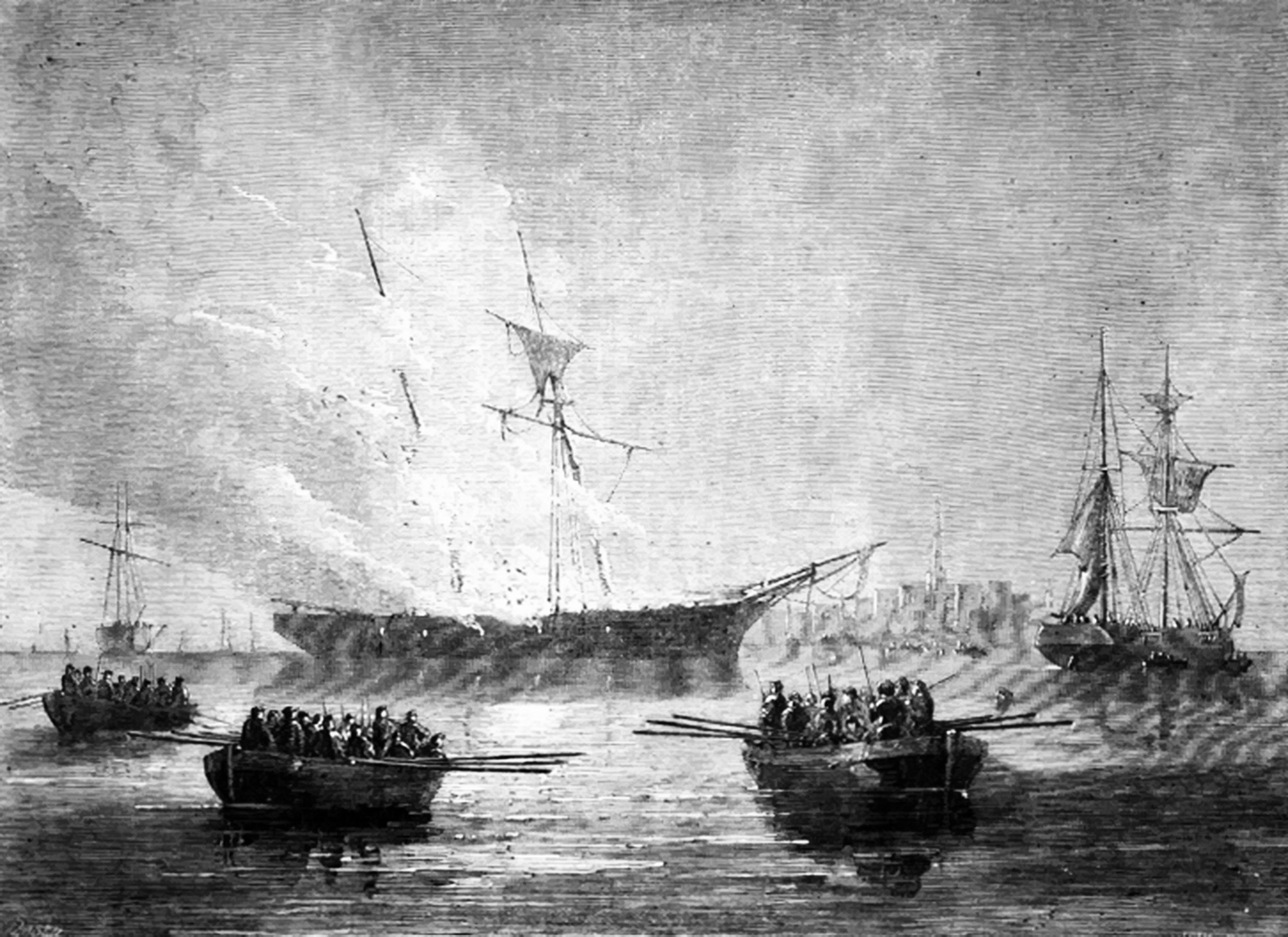
The Burning of the Gaspee

In September 1768 he was given command of HMS Gaspee. In March 1772 the ship was ordered to go to Rhode Island to patrol the waters to prevent smuggling of contraband goods in evasion of taxation. In these seizures the crew were awarded a percentage of the value of the goods seized, which was a strong incentive. Seizures were therefore often a little overenthusiastic and included some ships where the correct duty had been paid.

On 9 June 1772 the Gaspee gave chase to the American sloop Hannah, and Benjamin Lindsey her captain, lured the Gaspee into the shallows, where she ran aground on a sandbar. Lindsey continued to Providence, Rhode island, where he organized colonial rebels, including John Brown and other members of the Sons of Liberty, for an attack on the Gaspee. The next day they rowed to the stranded Gaspee and took Duddingston and his crew prisoner before setting fire to the ship. The captured men were held at Pawtuxet Village.

Details of his release are unclear, but he reappears as commander of HMS Bonetta in August 1772. In February 1773 he received a pension of £91 per annum for his wounds received in the Gaspee Affair. In January 1775 he was placed in charge of HMS Senegal. From 2 to 4 July 1776 he was involved in the Staten Island Landings along with 140 other British ships. In March 1777 he was given command of the newly complete HMS Cameleon. Only in September 1777 was he promoted to captain and given charge of a 28 gun ship captured from the Americans in 1776, provocatively re-named HMS Boston.

== Final years ==
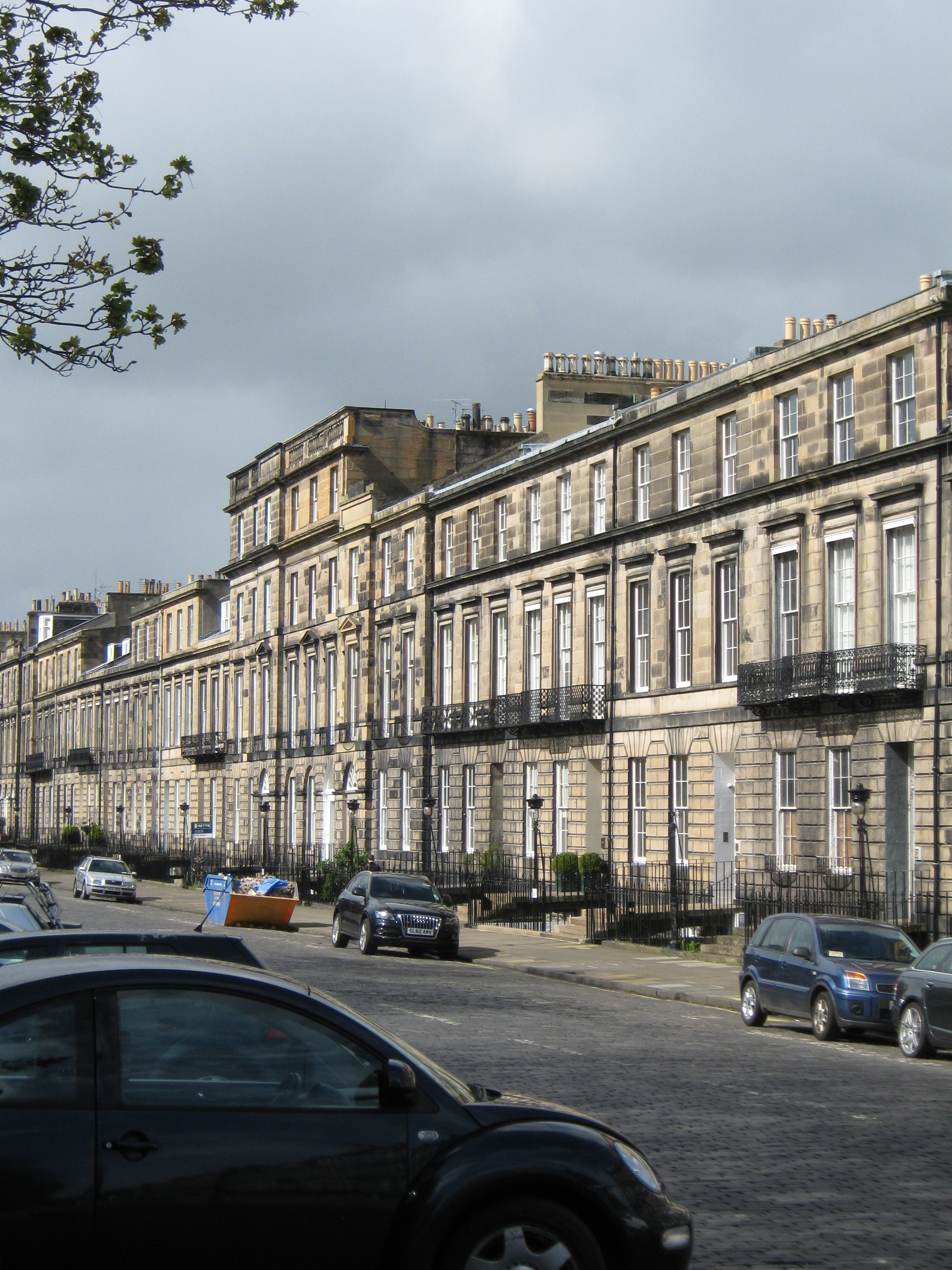
Heriot Row, Edinburgh

When Duddingston retired around 1805, he was wealthy enough to buy two substantial houses: Earlsferry House in Fife and 4 Heriot Row, a huge newly completed townhouse in Edinburgh. Earlsferry House was specially commissioned by Duddingston. He retired in November 1794.

Duddington died on 27 October 1817 in Earlsferry in Fife. He is thought to be buried nearby in Elie Churchyard.

Earlsferry House was demolished around 1958, mainly due to the burdens of inheritance tax, but Heriot Row survives in its entirety.

== Recognition ==
Gaspee Street in Providence, Rhode Island, is named after Duddingston's ship.

== Sources ==
- Mark, Harrison W. (2023). "Gaspee Affair". World History Encyclopedia.
- "William Dudingston". www.gaspee.org. 1772 Gaspee Virtual Archives.
