= Glasper =

Glasper is a surname. Notable people with the surname include:

- Robert Glasper (born 1978), American jazz pianist
- Ryan Glasper (born 1985), Canadian and American football player
- Tyre Glasper (born 1987), American football player

== See also ==
- Gasper (name)
