= Trevor Hoyle =

English science fiction author

- Born: 25 February 1940 (age 86); Rochdale, Lancashire, England, United Kingdom
- Other names: Trevor Smith, Larry Milne, Joseph Rance
- Occupation: Author

Trevor Hoyle (born 25 February 1940 in Rochdale, Lancashire, England, United Kingdom) is an English science fiction author. In the late 1970s he gained recognition for his "Q" series, featuring Christian Queghan, a scientific investigator possessing the ability to journey through time as well as to hypothetical worlds. As well as a number of Blake's 7 novels. Hoyle also writes as Larry Milne and Joseph Rance.

== 'Q' series ==
In the Q series, Chris Queghan is an anthropologist on Earth IVn, a colonial offshoot of Earth billions of years from the present day. In the first novel, Seeking the Mythical Future, Queghan is apparently an astronaut who travels through the event horizon of a black hole into an alternate universe, whose "Earth IVn" is a dystopia. "Queghan" lands in a blood-red sea, leeches are still actively used within medicine, rats roam hospital corridors and hospital hygiene is non-existent, "King Jimmy K" (Jimmy Carter) rules an intact and absolutist British Empire which includes "New Amerika", mental health professionals control the "Medikal Direkorate Authority" and "Psychological Concentration Camps", Australasia (Australia) is still a penal continent for the empire and torture is considered to be a legitimate criminal justice procedure. However, it turns out that the astronaut who has been trapped on "Earth IVn" is not Queghan, but another astronaut who crossed the event horizon and entered its alternate universe, which is in resonance with the auditory and visual hallucinations of Stahl, who is experiencing schizophrenia in a psychiatric hospital ward of the original Earth IVn. However, it is still an hallucination and when its faux-Queghan figure disappears, so does the surrounding hallucinatory facade. In Through the Eye of Time, Oswald Mosley and the British Union of Fascists control an alternate thirties United Kingdom, and ally themselves with Nazi Germany against France, Japan and the United States. Finally, in The Gods Look Down, an anachronistic matter replicator device is being used in biblical Canaan to help feed itinerant Hebrew communities after the Exodus from ancient Egypt.

- Seeking the Mythical Future - Panther, 1977 (ISBN 0-586-04366-7)
- Through the Eye of Time - Panther, 1977 (ISBN 978-0-586-04367-7)
- The Gods Look Down - Panther, 1978 (ISBN 0-586-04368-3)

== Blake's 7 ==
- Terry Nation's Blake's 7 (1977) (adapts the Series 1 episodes "The Way Back", "Space Fall", "Cygnus Alpha" and "Time Squad")
- Project Avalon (1979) (adapts the Series 1 episodes "Seek–Locate–Destroy", "Duel", "Project Avalon", "Deliverance" and "Orac")
- Scorpio Attack (1981) (adapts the Series 4 episodes "Rescue", "Traitor" and "Stardrive")

== Other works ==
- Rule of Night (1975)
- Earth Cult (1979)
- The Man Who Travelled on Motorways (1979)
- This Sentient Earth (1979)
- Bullet Train (1980 – with Arei Kato)
- The Svengali Plot (1980)
- Through The Eye of Time (1982)
- The Gods Look Down (1982)
- The Last Gasp (1983)
- Vail (1984)
- Scorpio Attack (1984)
- Kids (1987)
- Blind Needle (1994)
- Mirrorman (1999)
