= Gasper =

Gasper may refer to:

== Places ==
- Gasper, Kentucky, in Logan County, Kentucky, U.S.
- Gasper Township, Preble County, Ohio, U.S.
- Stourton with Gasper, a civil parish in Wiltshire, England, U.K.

== People ==
- Gasper, Canadian rock band from Truro, Nova Scota
- Gasper (name), both a given name and surname; includes a list of people with the name
- Gasper, one who gasps
- Gasper, a participant in erotic asphyxiation

== Other uses ==
- Gasper, an alternative name for the exclamation mark.
- Gasper, British slang for a type of high-tar cigarette, such as:
  - Woodbine (cigarette)
  - Gauloises
- Gasper (aircraft), a type of adjustable ventilation outlet used in aircraft
- Gasper goo, or freshwater drum, a species of fish
- Gasper Limestone, a geologic formation in Virginia, U.S.
- Gasper River, a river in southwestern Kentucky, U.S.

== See also ==
- Casper (disambiguation)
- Gaspar (disambiguation)
- Gasp (disambiguation)
