= HMS Gaspee =

Several ships of the Royal Navy have borne the name Gaspee (or Gaspe):

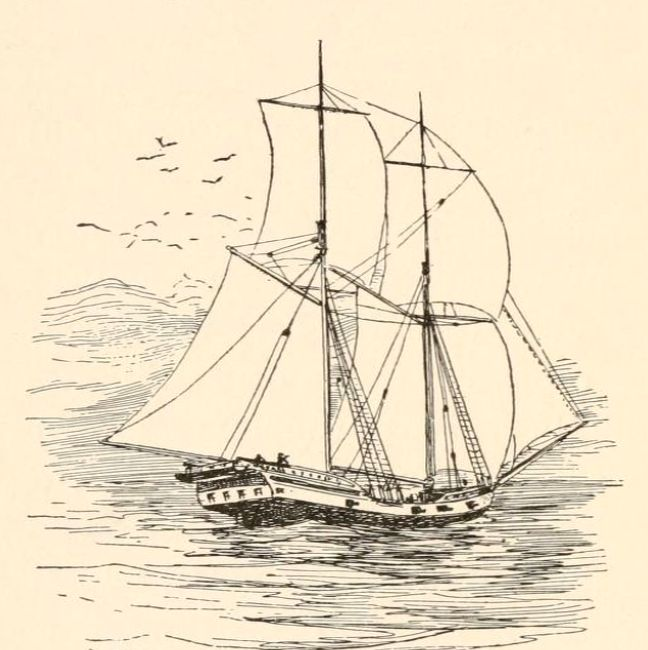
HMS Gaspee (the schooner destroyed in 1772

- Gaspee (1763) was a revenue schooner famously destroyed in the 1772 Gaspee Affair in Narragansett Bay.
- HMS Gaspée was a schooner or brig purchased in North America, and captured on 23 November 1775. Her captors scuttled her but the Royal Navy retrieved her in May 1776. She served again in 1777 but her subsequent fate is unknown.
