= Gasper (name) =

Gasper is a name, appearing as both a given name and surname. Notable people with the name include:

== Given name ==
=== Sports ===
==== Basketball ====
- Gašper Okorn (born 1973), Slovenian basketball coach
- Gašper Potočnik (born 1980), Slovenian basketball coach
- Gašper Vidmar (born 1987), Slovenian basketball player

==== Cycling ====
- Gašper Katrašnik (born 1995), Slovenian cyclist
- Gašper Švab (born 1986), Slovenian cyclist

==== Football (soccer) ====
- Gašper Černe (born 2004), Slovenian footballer
- Anna Gasper (born 1997), German footballer

==== Ice hockey ====
- Gašper Kopitar (born 1992), Slovenian ice hockey player
- Gašper Krošelj (born 1987), Slovenian ice hockey player

==== Skiing ====
- Gašper Berlot (born 1990), Slovenian Nordic combined skier
- Gašper Markič (born 1986), Slovenian alpine skier

==== Other sports ====
- Gašper Fistravec (born 1987), Slovenian rower
- Gasper Urban (1923–1998), American gridiron football player
- Gašper Vinčec (born 1981), Slovenian competitive sailor

=== Other ===
- Gasper Grima (c. 1680–1745), Maltese philosopher
- Gaspër Krasniqi (died 1876), Albanian Roman Catholic priest
- Gasper Lawal (born 1948), Nigerian drummer, storyteller, and composer
- Gašper Mašek (1794–1873), Czech-Slovenian composer
- Gaspër Jakova Mërturi (1870–1941), Albanian defrocked priest and writer

== Surname ==
=== Sports ===
- Anna Gasper (born 1997), German footballer
- Chase Gasper (born 1996), American soccer player
- Mickey Gasper (born 1995), American baseball player
- Robert Gasper (born 1958), Canadian luge athlete

=== Other ===
- Des Gasper, development studies academic in the Netherlands
- Elon Gasper (born 1952), high-tech executive in the United States
- George Gasper (born 1939), American mathematician
- Julia Gasper, English independent academic specialising in early modern literature
- Reann Gasper, Canadian politician

== See also ==
- Caspar (disambiguation)
- Casper (disambiguation)
- Gaspar (disambiguation)
- Gasper (disambiguation)
- Glasper (disambiguation)
