= Horatio B. Knox =

American academic

Horatio Bickford Knox (November 16, 1856 - April 14, 1912) was an American academic and an instructor in Civics and History at the Rhode Island Normal School.

He was born in Cambria, Pennsylvania, son of Simeon Pease Knox and Sarah E. Bickford. He graduated from Colby College in 1881, and earned an M.A. in 1895.

He was principal of the Boynton School in Eastport, Maine from 1881-1884, and principal of the Palmer, Massachusetts high school from 1884-1893. He taught Latin and Greek at Moses Brown School in Providence, Rhode Island from 1893-1904. From 1904-1912, he was an instructor in Civics and History at the Rhode Island Normal School.

In 1908, he published "The Destruction of the Gaspee," written for school children in Rhode Island. He was a member of the American Institute of Instruction, the Rhode Island Historical Society.

He was an active member of Central Congregational Church, serving as director of its Sunday School. He was also a Mason, a member of the University Club, the Congregational Club, President of the Barnard Club and the Rhode Island Institute of Instruction.

He married Mary Edgerton Roberts on August 18, 1882, and had two children.
