= John Allen (minister) =

John Allen (c. 1741 – c. 1780s) was a Baptist minister in Colonial America. Although not well-connected with colonial patriots in British North America, he had an enormous impact on re-igniting the tensions within the British Empire in 1772 when he mentioned the Gaspee affair and the Royal Commission of Inquiry seven times in his Thanksgiving Day sermon at Second Baptist Church in Boston. His sermon "An Oration, Upon the Beauties of Liberty, Or the Essential Rights of the Americans," was reprinted seven times in four different cities, making it one of the most popular pre-independence pamphlets in British America.

== Early life ==
In 1764 at age 23, Allen was ordained and installed as the pastor of the Particular Baptist Church in Spitalfields, London. Like most Baptist ministers, Allen had to earn his livelihood through secular work. He opened a linen-drapers shop in Shoreditch. When his business failed, Allen's debt grew, and he spent some time incarcerated at the King's Bench Prison. When the Particular Baptist congregation dismissed him he briefly found a new pastorate at Broadstairs. In 1767 he was dismissed by the congregation, and in 1768 he returned to London as a schoolteacher. By January 1769 he was again in financial trouble, and he was tried at the Old Bailey for forging a £50 note. Although he was acquitted, this trial destroyed his reputation, and its stigma followed him to Boston.

== Later life ==
In 1770, Allen published The Spirit of Liberty. Already showing his radical political views and his sympathies for the developing American cause, this pamphlet argues for the return of John Wilkes to Parliament and defends the rights of the individual. Most chroniclers believe that he left London for New York in 1771 though Allen did not re-appear in the historical record until 1772. At that time, the Second Baptist Church in Boston was searching for a teaching elder following Pastor John Davis's leaving due to health issues. Davis knew of Allen and made it clear before he died that he wanted Allen to preach at Second Baptist. The church committee knew something of Allen's reputation in England and so was reluctant to invite him to speak.

After some debate, they asked him to give the annual Thanksgiving Day address. His sermon "An Oration, Upon the Beauties of Liberty, Or the Essential Rights of the Americans," was reprinted seven times in four different cities, making it one of the most popular pre-independence pamphlets in British America. Allen remained as a "visiting pastor" from November 1772 to July 1773. The Second Baptist Church did not extend a permanent call to him.

== Death ==
Allen was not well-connected with other colonial patriots, and there is no record of him following his service at Second Baptist Church. Some argue that he continued to publish pamphlets into the 1780s; most sources placed his death at age 33 in 1774. The Oxford Dictionary of National Biography dates his death between 1783 and 1788. Bumsted and Clark argue that it may have been as late as 1789.
