= HMCS Gaspé =

Several Canadian naval units have been named HMCS Gaspé;

- HMCS Gaspé (J94), a Fundy-class minesweeper that entered service in 1938 and was discarded in 1945.
- HMCS Gaspé (MCB 143), a Bay-class minesweeper that entered service in 1953 and was transferred to the Turkish Navy in 1958 and renamed Trabzon.

== Battle honours ==
- Atlantic, 1939–45
