= The Last Gasp (novel) =

1983 novel

The Last Gasp is a novel by Trevor Hoyle published in 1983.

== Plot summary ==
The Last Gasp is a novel in which industrialization causes the depletion of oxygen, which then results in mass deaths, upheavals in society, and mutations.

== Reception ==
Dave Pringle reviewed The Last Gasp for Imagine magazine, and stated that "If one could carry this fairly conventional bestseller back 130 years in a time machine and give it to Mr Dickens to read, one suspects it would be utterly beyond his comprehension. The world has moved on, and the hard times have changed indeed."

== Reviews ==
- Review by Dan Chow (1983) in Locus, #275 December 1983
- Review by Don D'Ammassa (1984) in Science Fiction Chronicle, January 1984
