= Dying gasp =

Message sent by a CPE to an ISP to indicate it has run out of power

A dying gasp is a message (or signal) sent by the customer premises equipment (CPE) to equipment managed by an internet service provider (ISP) to indicate that the CPE has lost power. Also known as last gasp.

== DSL ==
A DSL device will send a dying gasp signal to the digital subscriber line access multiplexer (DSLAM) when a power outage occurs. A DSL interface with dying gasp must derive power for a brief period from another source so that the message can be sent without external power. The dying gasp message will end the session and a new session will be able to be made as soon as power returns and the modem retrains.

Dying gasp is referenced in section 7.1.2.5.3 of ITU-T Recommendation G.991.2 (12/2003) as the Power Status bit.

== Fiber ==
When an optical network terminal loses power it will send a dying gasp signal to the optical line terminal which will end the session.

== See also ==
- Passive optical network
