= Pawtuxet Village =

Village in Rhode Island, United States

- Pawtuxet Village Historic District
- U.S. National Register of Historic Places
- U.S. Historic district
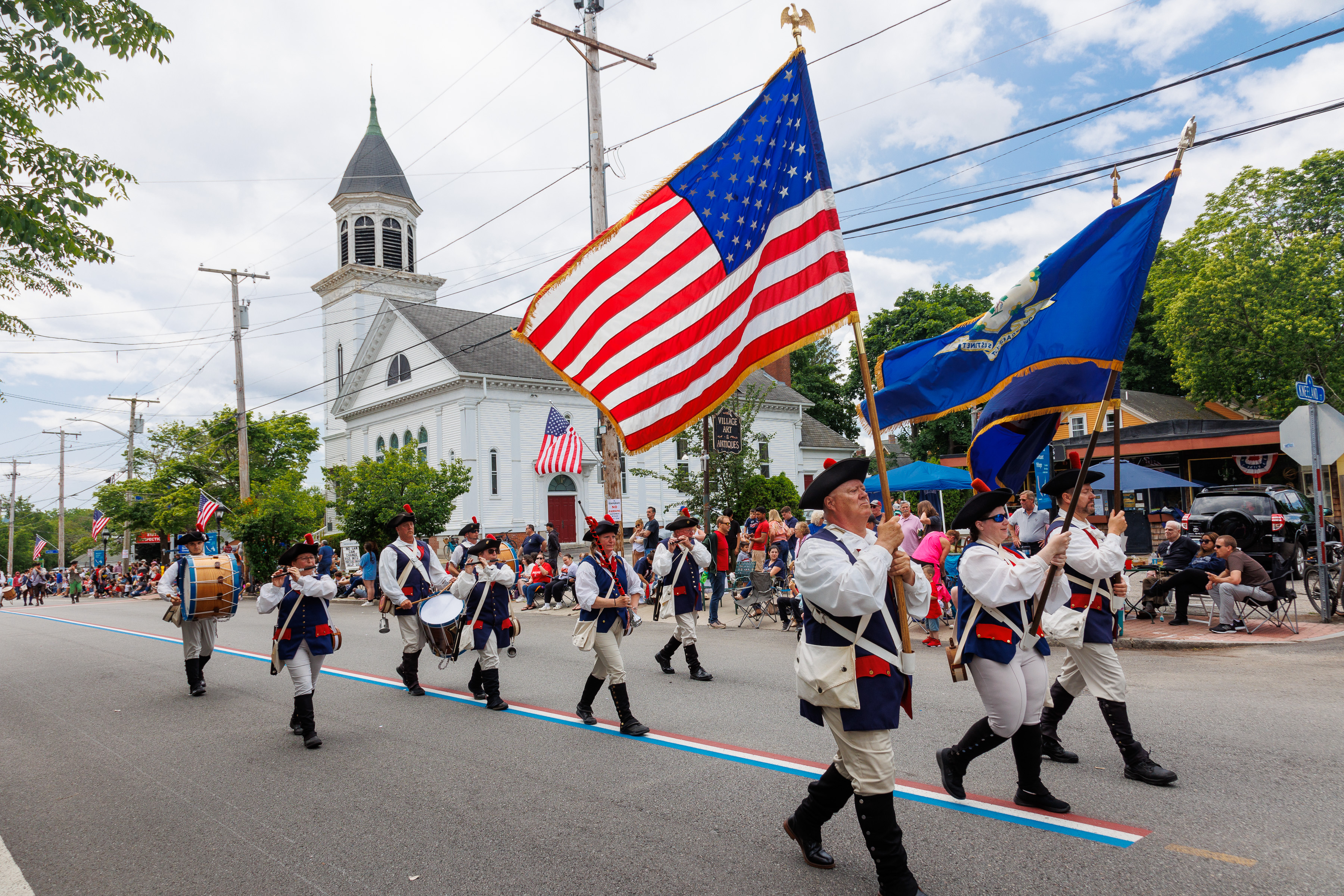
- Pawtuxet is known for its annual Gaspee Days celebration

- Location within Rhode Island Location within the United States
- Location: Bounded roughly by Bayside, S. Atlantic, and Ocean Aves., Pawtuxet and Providence Rivers, and Post Rd., Cranston, Rhode Island, U.S.
- Coordinates: 41°45′49″N 71°23′27″W
- Built: 1638
- Architect: Multiple
- Architectural style: Late Victorian
- NRHP reference No.: 73000050
- Added to NRHP: April 24, 1973

Pawtuxet Village (PAH-tucks-it) is a section of the New England cities of Warwick and Cranston, Rhode Island, United States. It is located at the point where the Pawtuxet River flows into the Providence River and Narragansett Bay.

== History ==
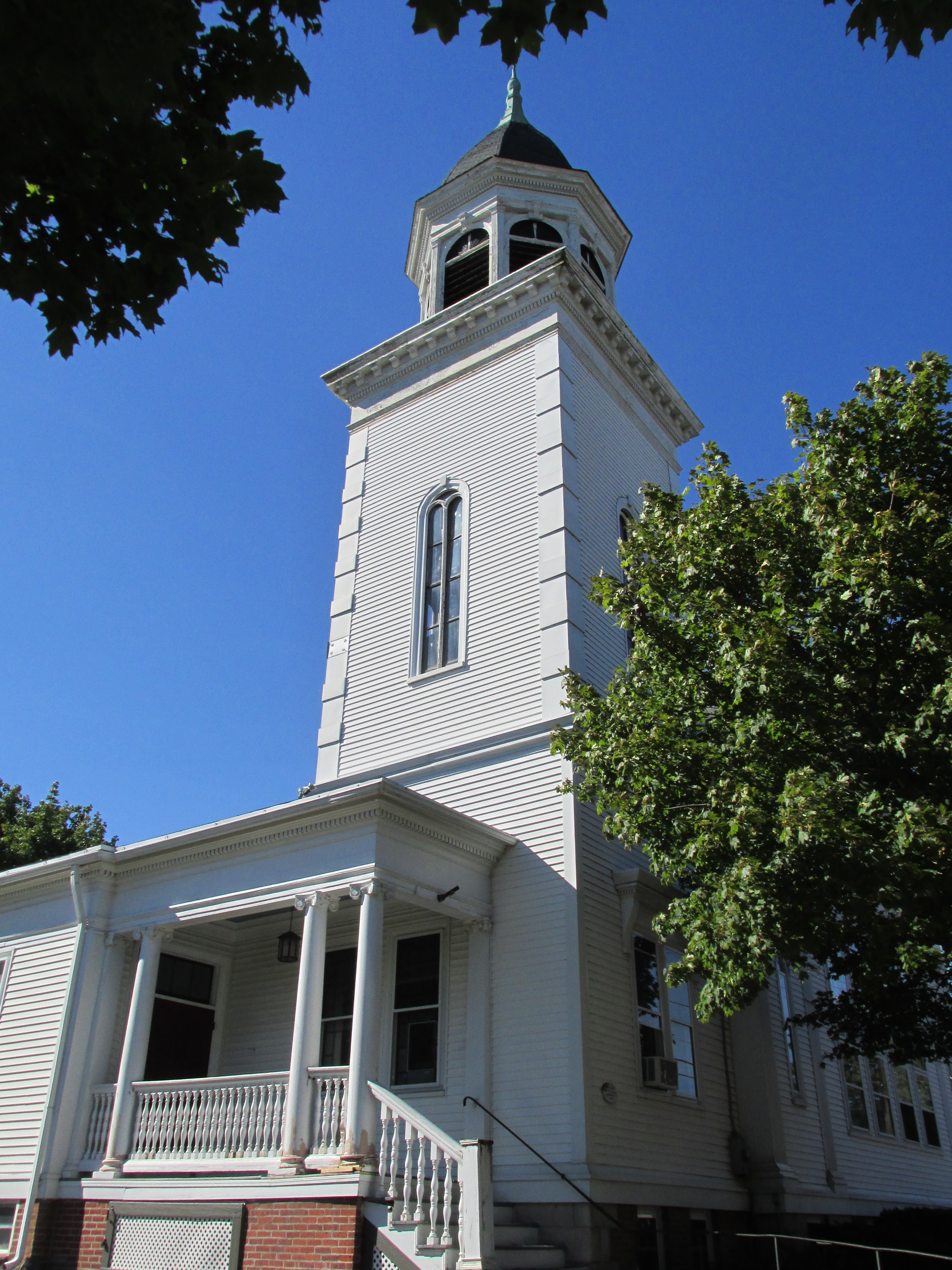
Pawtuxet Baptist Church

Pawtuxet means "Little Falls" in the Narragansett language, and this area was originally occupied by the Sononoce Pawtuxet band, part of the larger Narragansett Indian tribe. In 1638, Rhode Island founder Roger Williams purchased the property extending south from Providence to the Pawtuxet River. Shortly after, his followers William Arnold, William Harris, William Carpenter, and Zachariah Rhodes settled along the fertile meadows of the Pawtuxet. Meanwhile, Samuel Gorton purchased the land south of the Pawtuxet River and became the founder of Warwick.

Early 18th-century inhabitants took advantage of the power of the Pawtuxet River by constructing various mills, and took advantage of its excellent harbor by building one of America's premier shipping ports. The Pawtuxet Village Historic District boasts dozens of preserved Colonial structures among its scenic blend of homes and buildings. The mouth of the Pawtuxet River was a strategic location to settle, and gave boats a safe harbor and the village considerable importance in the triangular trade of the day, and shipyards for the coastal and West Indies trade were located here.

It was here in 1772 where Rhode Island patriots took the first organized military action towards independence by attacking and burning the hated British revenue schooner HMS Gaspée. This was America's "First Blow for Freedom", known as the Gaspee Affair, and led directly to the establishment of permanent Committees of Correspondence, unifying the individual colonies, and starting the process of the American Revolution. The cities of Cranston and Warwick celebrate this historic role of Pawtuxet Village by hosting the annual Gaspee Days Parade each June.

During the early 19th-century, Christopher and William Rhodes formed the textile manufacturing firm which controlled the prosperity and swayed the destiny of Pawtuxet for more than half a century. It changed from a shipping port to a mill village with textile mills at either end of the Pawtuxet Falls. Pawtuxet shops and businesses of the 19th-century may be seen on old advertising maps from about 1862 to 1870.

In the late 19th-century, the Rhodes family developed one of Rhode Island's top attractions called the Rhodes-on-the-Pawtuxet casino, dance hall, and canoe center. Trolley lines from Providence carried vast numbers to the Pawtuxet area for entertainment.

In the 21st-century, Pawtuxet Village became known as a food destination, with eateries ranging from a tea room, Parisian cafe, Irish pub, Thai restaurant, creperie, ice cream, and more. The Friends of Pawtuxet Village host an annual Taste of Pawtuxet event to highlight local eateries.

== Gaspee Days celebration ==
Gaspee Days parade

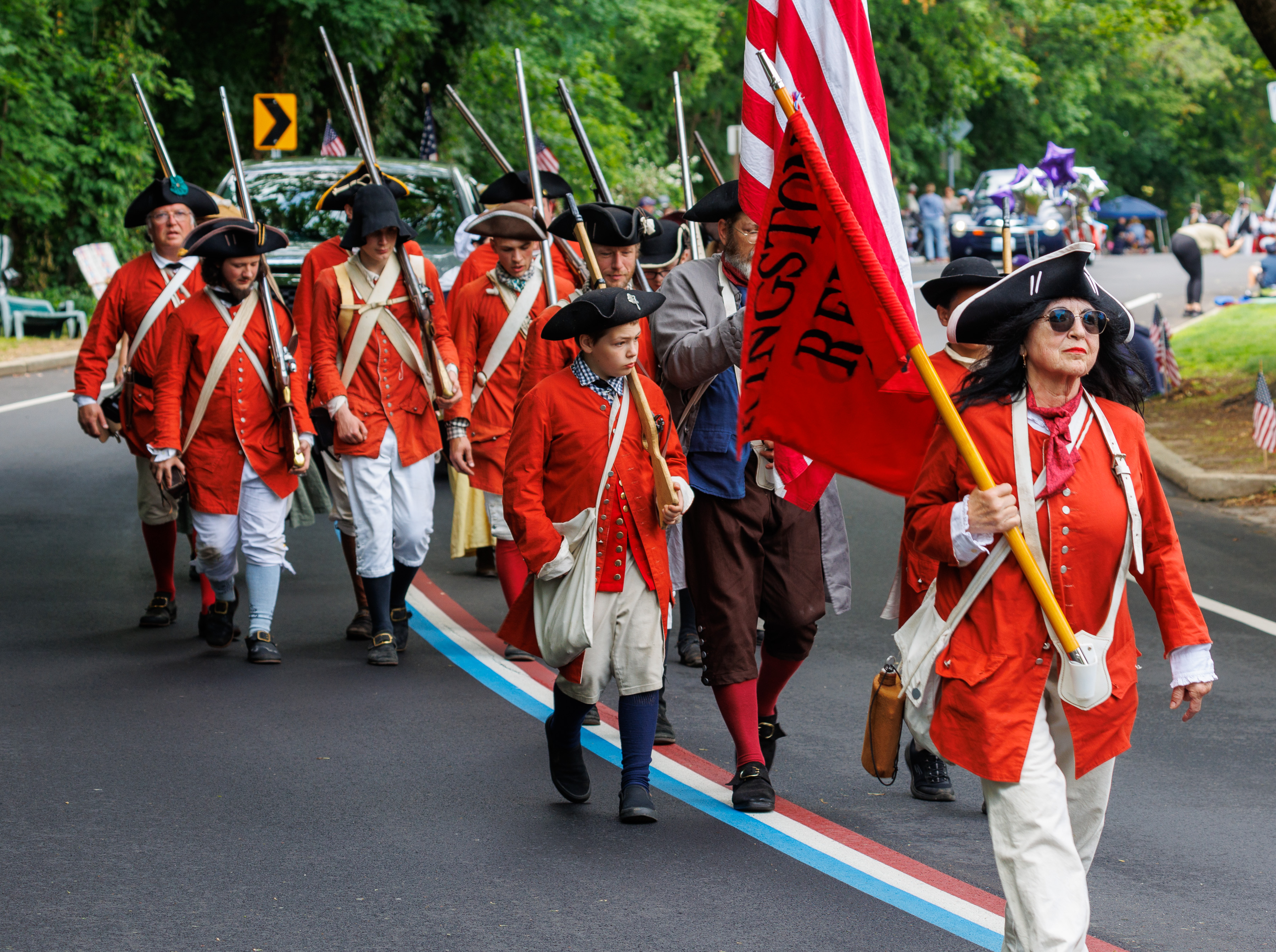
Kingston Reds

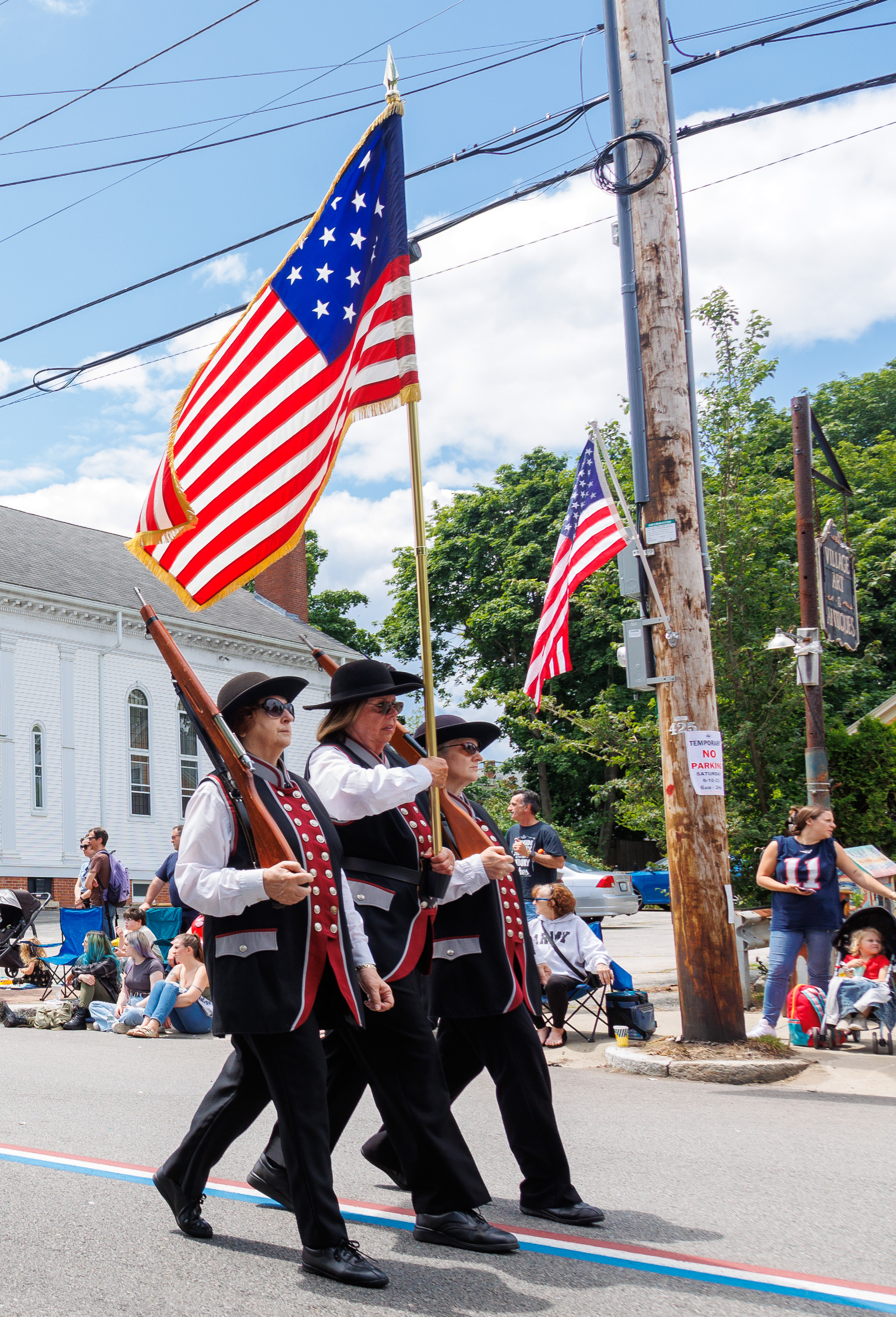
Connecticut Patriots

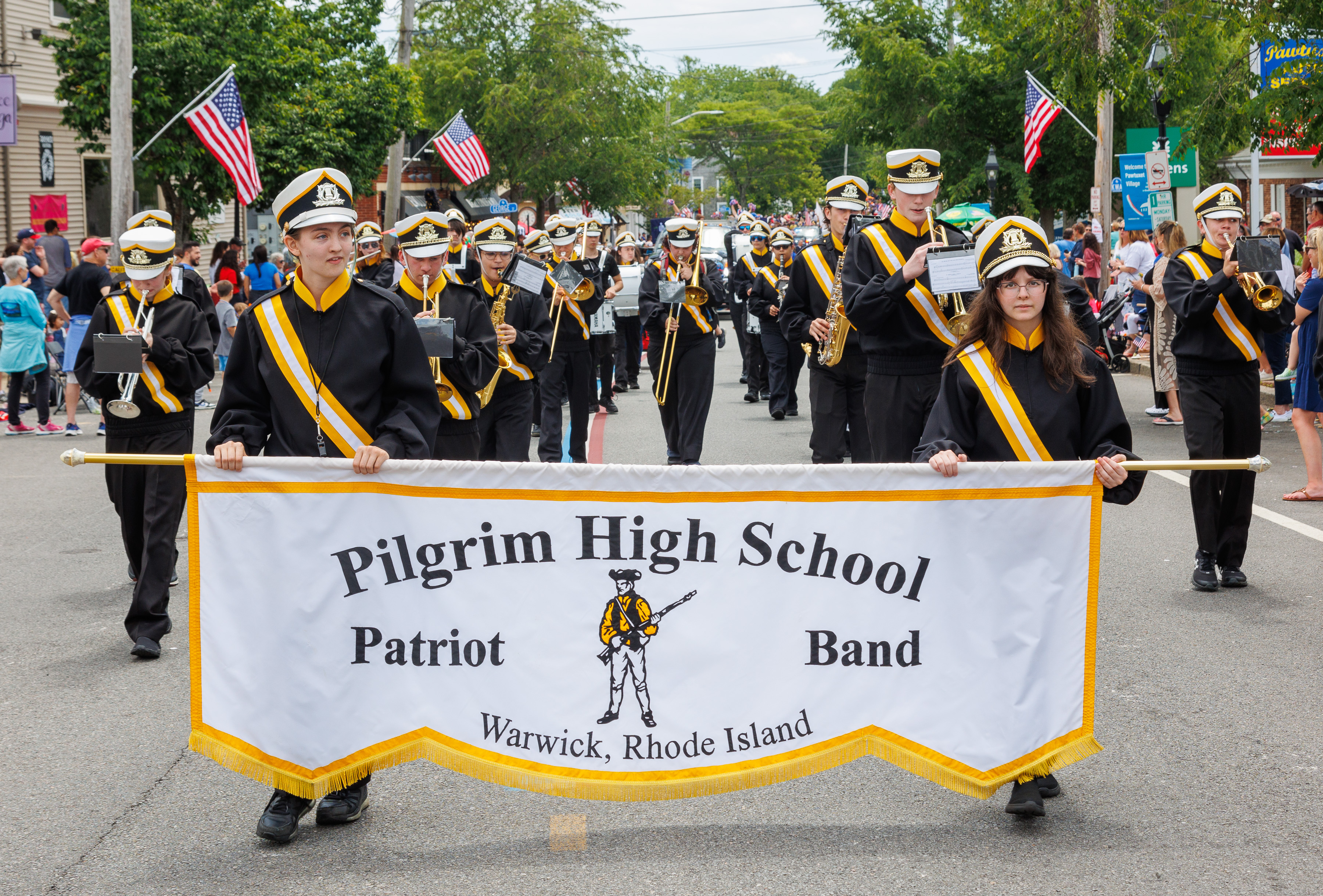
Pilgrim High School Patriot Band.jpg

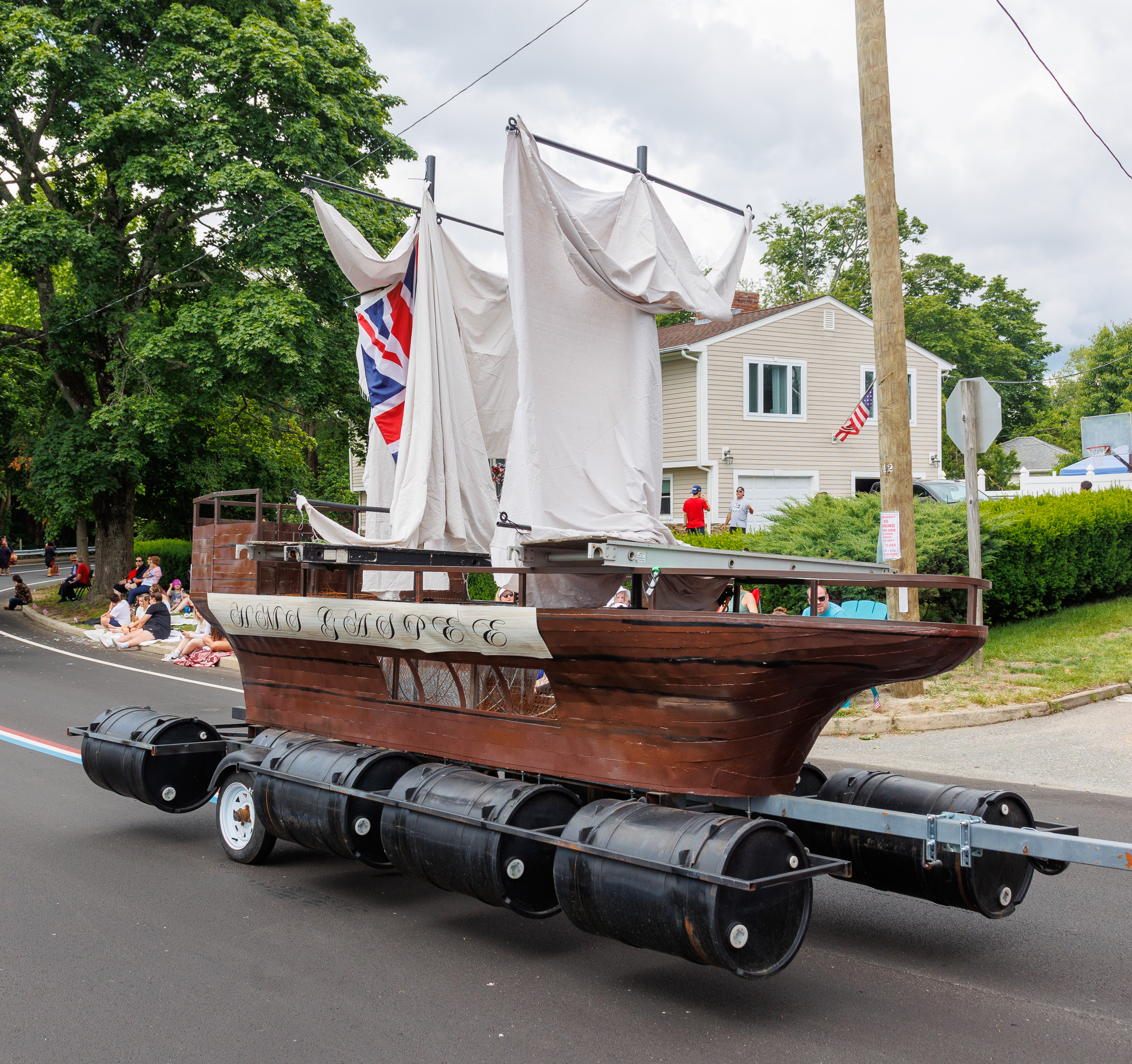
Mock HMS Gaspee

Since 1965, the town has hosted a multi-day series of events known as Gaspee Days which commemorates the Gaspee Affair, the 1772 burning of the British revenue schooner HMS Gaspée. The events include an arts and crafts festival, fireworks, concerts, 5k race, colonial encampment, parade, and fundraising events. The Gaspee Days Parade is held annually on the second Saturday in June. The parade showcases Rhode Island's many ceremonial Independent Military Organizations as well as Colonial Fife & Drum Corps and bands from as far away as Connecticut and Massachusetts. Local dignitaries and civic organizations also participate.

The Gaspee Days celebration concludes with a reenactment of the burning of the Gaspée at Pawtuxet Park.

== Notable residents ==
- Elisha Hunt Rhodes (1842–1917), soldier of the 2nd Rhode Island Volunteers and diarist of the Civil War
- Vanessa Carlton (1980–), American singer-songwriter and pianist

== See also ==
- Experiment (horse-powered boat), first tested here
- National Register of Historic Places listings in Providence County, Rhode Island
- National Register of Historic Places listings in Kent County, Rhode Island
- The Case of Charles Dexter Ward, a 1927 story by H. P. Lovecraft, partially set in the village
