= Gaspee Point =

- U.S. National Register of Historic Places
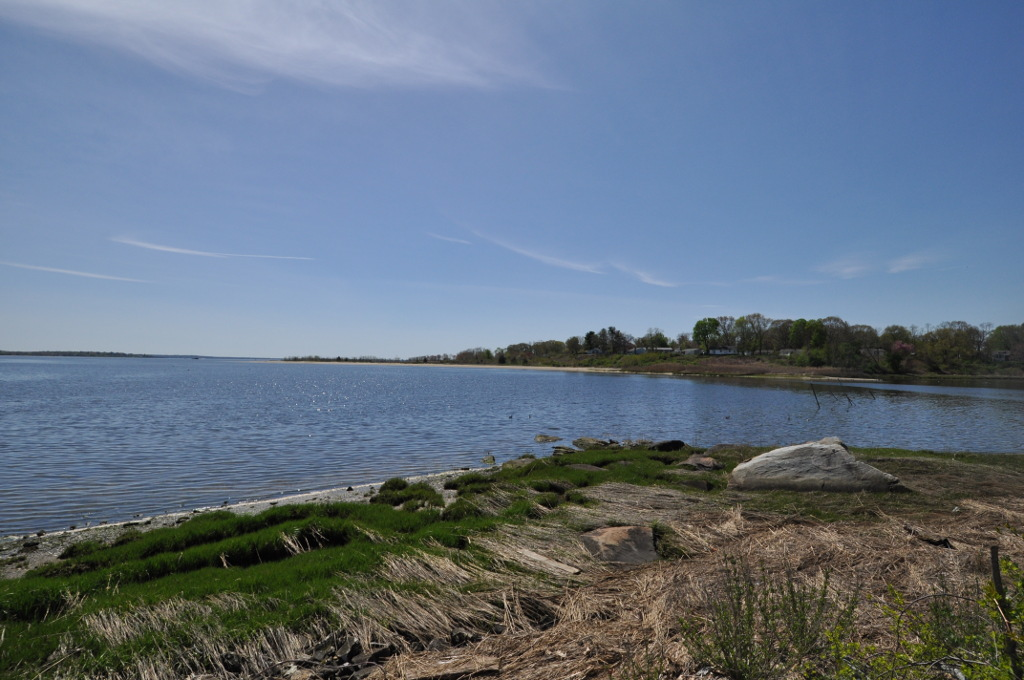
- Gaspee Point in May 2017

- Location within Rhode Island Location within the United States
- Location: Warwick, Rhode Island, U.S.
- Coordinates: 41°44′40″N 71°22′42″W
- Built: 1772
- NRHP reference No.: 72000018
- Added to NRHP: June 8, 1972

Gaspee Point is a small peninsula on the west side of the southern reaches of the Providence River in Warwick, Rhode Island. It is bounded on the north by Passeonkquis Cove and on the south by Occupessatuxet Cove, and is accessible by Namquid Drive in Warwick.

The site was added to the National Register of Historic Places in 1972.

== Gaspée affair ==
Gaspee Point was the site of one of the first acts in the American Revolution when the Royal Navy's HMS Gaspee was grounded there by American patriots on June 9, 1772 in what became known as the Gaspée affair.

HMS Gaspee was a revenue schooner locally detested for its enforcement of the unpopular Navigation Acts. Patriots rowed out to HMS Gaspee whilst stranded on Nanquid, a spit of sand about nine miles below Providence during the night of June 9, 1772. After boarding they burnt the ship in the early hours of Wednesday June 10 in an act of open rebellion against the colonial-era governance of the British Empire, who viewed it as an act of piracy.

== See also ==
- National Register of Historic Places listings in Kent County, Rhode Island
