= Gaspee affair =

1772 burning of a British navy schooner

- Part of the American Revolution
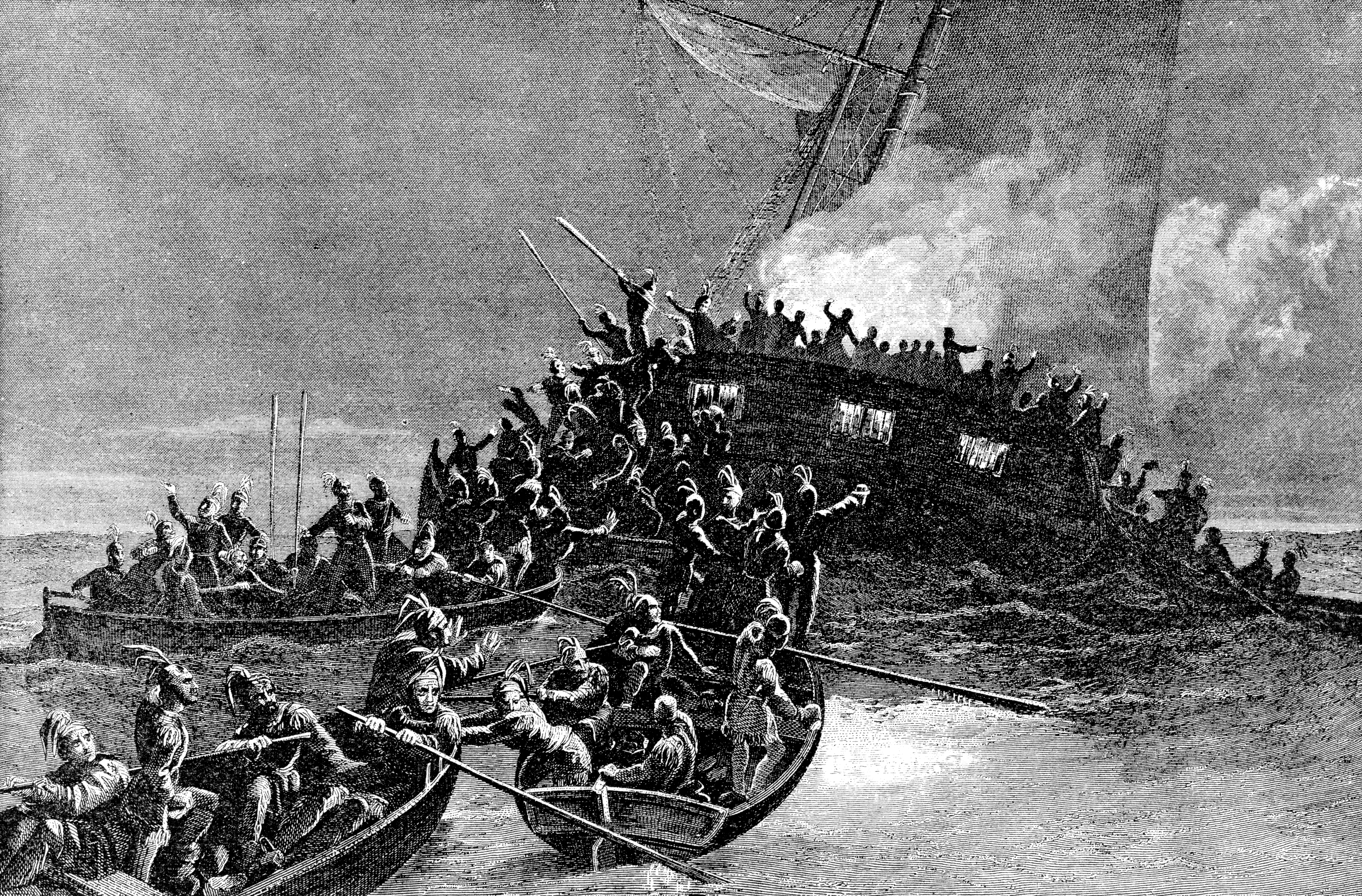
- 1886 engraving of the burning of Gaspee by the Sons of Liberty
- Date: June 9, 1772
- Location: Near Gaspee Point, Rhode Island
- Caused by: Opposition to the Royal Navy's enforcement of custom laws in Rhode Island ports
- Methods: Arson
- Result: Gaspee burnt

Parties
Sons of Liberty	Great Britain

Lead figures
Abraham Whipple; John Brown	William Duddingston (WIA)

The Gaspee affair was a significant event in the lead-up to the American Revolution. HMS Gaspee was a Royal Navy revenue schooner that enforced the Navigation Acts around Newport, Rhode Island, in 1772. It ran aground in shallow water while chasing the packet boat Hannah on June 9 off Warwick, Rhode Island. That night a group of men led by Abraham Whipple and John Brown attacked, boarded, and burned the Gaspee to the waterline.

The event sharply increased tensions between American colonists and Crown officials, particularly given that it had followed the Boston Massacre in 1770. Crown officials in Rhode Island aimed to increase their control over the colony's legitimate trade and stamp out smuggling in order to increase their revenue from the colony. Concomitantly, Rhode Islanders increasingly protested the Townshend Acts and other British policies that had interfered with the colony's traditional businesses, which primarily rested on involvement in the maritime trade.

Along with similar events in Narragansett Bay, the affair marked the first acts of violent uprising against Crown authority in British North America, preceding the Boston Tea Party by more than a year and moving the Thirteen Colonies as a whole toward the coming war for independence.

== Background ==
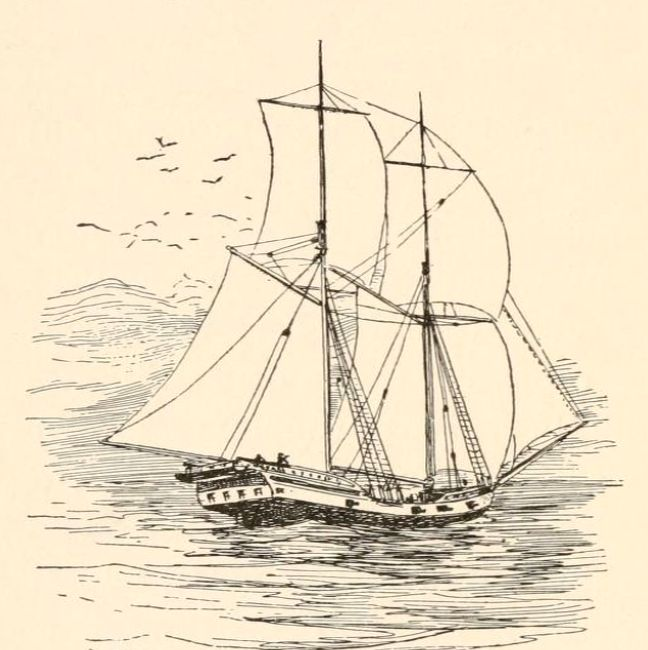
HMS Gaspee

The British Customs service had a history of facing strong resistance in the Thirteen Colonies in the 18th century. Britain was at war during much of this period and was not in a strategic position to risk antagonizing its overseas colonies. Several successive ministries implemented new policies following Britain's victory in the French and Indian War (the component of the Seven Years' War in North America) in an attempt to increase control within the colonies and to recoup some of the heavy cost of the war. The British Parliament argued that revenue was necessary to bolster military and naval defensive positions along the borders of their distant colonies and also to pay the debt which Britain had incurred in pursuing the war against France.

One policy included deputizing Royal Navy officers to enforce customs laws in American ports. The Admiralty purchased six Marblehead sloops and schooners and gave them Anglicized French names based on their recent acquisitions in Canada, removing the French accents from St John, St Lawrence, Chaleur, Hope, Magdalen, and Gaspee. The enforcement became increasingly intrusive and aggressive in Narragansett Bay. Serious riots had in a number of instances occurred in response to what was considered by the colonists as an unjust incursion on their trade and livelihood.

Rhode Islanders finally responded by attacking HMS St John in 1764, and they burned the revenue sloop Liberty in 1768 on Goat Island. Captain Samuel Hood of HMS Romsey reporting in 1767 that Gaspee was repaired at Halifax after damaging her gripe and false keel after going ashore near Rhode Island suggests Gaspee was no stranger to Rhode Islanders or its shoals.

In early 1772, Lieutenant William Dudingston sailed Gaspee into Narragansett Bay to enforce customs collection and mandatory inspection of cargo. He arrived in Rhode Island in February and met with Governor Joseph Wanton. Soon after he began patrolling Narragansett Bay, Gaspee stopped and inspected the sloop Fortune on February 17 and seized 12 hogsheads of undeclared rum. Duddingston sent the Fortune and seized rum to Boston, believing that any seized items left in a Rhode Island port would be reclaimed by the colonists. This move brought outrage within the Rhode Island colony, because Duddingston had taken upon himself the authority to determine where the trial should take place concerning the seizure, superseding the authority of Wanton. Furthermore, it was a direct violation of the Rhode Island Royal Charter to hold a trial outside of Rhode Island on an arrest that took place within the colony.

Duddingston and his crew became increasingly aggressive in their searches, boardings, and seizures, even going so far as to stop merchants who were on shore and force searches of their wares. Public resentment and outrage continued to escalate against Gaspee in particular and against the British in general. A local sheriff threatened Duddingston with arrest, and Rear Admiral John Montagu responded with a letter threatening to hang as pirates anyone who made effort to rescue ships taken by Duddingston during his operations.

On March 21, Rhode Island Deputy Governor Darius Sessions wrote to Wanton, requesting that the basis of Duddingston's authority be examined. Sessions includes the opinion of Chief Justice Stephen Hopkins, who argues that "no commander of any vessel has any right to use any authority in the Body of the Colony without previously applying to the Governor and showing his warrant for so doing." Wanton wrote to Duddingston the next day, demanding "produce me your commission and instructions, if any you have, which was your duty to have done when you first came within the jurisdiction of this Colony." Duddingston returned a rude reply to Wanton, refusing to leave his ship or to acknowledge Wanton's elected authority within Rhode Island.

== Incident ==
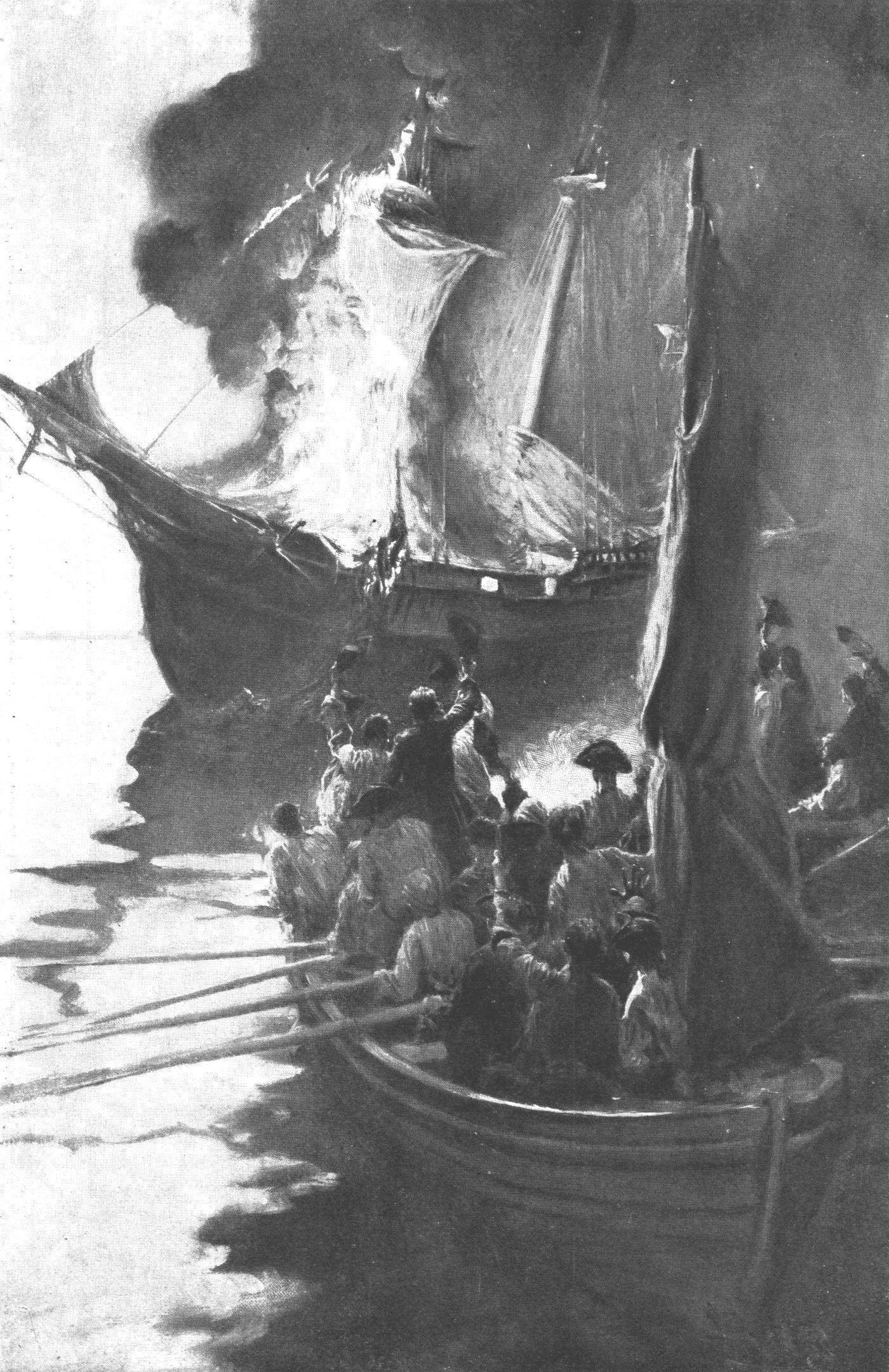
August 1883 Harper's Magazine illustration of HMS Gaspee's burning

On June 9, Gaspee gave chase to the packet ship Hannah but ran aground in shallow water on the northwestern side of the bay on what is now Gaspee Point. The crew were unable to free the ship, and Duddingston decided to wait for high tide to set the vessel afloat. Before that could happen, however, a band of Providence men in 18 boats armed with pistols, guns and clubs led by Abraham Whipple and John Brown decided to act on the "opportunity offered of putting an end to the trouble and vexation she daily caused." In an affidavit, one of the men testifies they were intent on burning the schooner. John Brown's brother Joseph was also in the boarding party.

Their flotilla rowed out to the ship which was about 9 miles from Rhode Island and boarded it at 1 a.m. on the morning of June 10. The crew put up a feeble resistance in which they were attacked with handspikes, and Duddingston was shot and wounded in the groin. Duddingston requested to be allowed down to his cabin, and two surgeons were ordered to dress his wounds. The boarding party casually read through the ship's papers before forcing the crew off the ship and setting it aflame. Since Gaspee was burnt and did not explode, it is likely that her magazine's gunpower had been looted.

A few days after being forced off the ship, Duddingston was arrested for an earlier seizure of colonial cargo. His commanding officer Rear Admiral Montagu freed him by paying his fine and then promptly sent him back to England to face a court-martial on the incident, since there were not enough ships from which to form a court-martial at Boston.

== Aftermath ==
=== Charges and investigative commission ===
Previous attacks by the Americans on British naval vessels had gone unpunished. In one case, a customs yacht had been destroyed by fire with no administrative response. But in 1772, the Admiralty would not ignore the destruction of one of its military vessels on station. The American Department consulted the solicitor and attorneys general, who investigated and advised the Privy Council on the legal and constitutional options available. These included charges of arson in royal dockyards, but the idea was dismissed as not legally credible, as HMS Gaspee was not in a dockyard when she was burned. The Crown turned to a centuries-old institution of investigation: the Royal Commission of Inquiry, made up of the chiefs of the supreme courts of Massachusetts, New York, and New Jersey, the judge of the vice-admiralty of Boston, and Rhode Island Governor Wanton.

The Dockyard Act passed in April 1772 demands that anyone suspected of burning British ships should be extradited and tried in England; however, Gaspee's raiders were charged with treason. The task of the commission was to determine which colonists had sufficient evidence against them to warrant shipping them to England for trial. The commission was unable to obtain sufficient evidence and declared their inability to deal with the case.

The British authorities called for the apprehension and trial of the people responsible for shooting Duddingston and destroying Gaspee. Governor Wanton and Deputy Governor Sessions echoed those same sentiments, but they lacked any enthusiasm for punishing their fellow Rhode Islanders. William Dickinson the British midshipman from HMS Gaspee described the attackers as "merchants and masters of vessels, who were at my bureau reading and examining my papers."

Admiral Montagu wrote to Wanton on July 8, nearly a month after the burning of the schooner, and utilized the account of Aaron Briggs, an indentured servant claiming to have participated in the June 9 burning. Montagu identified five Rhode Islanders, in varying levels of detail, whom he wanted Wanton to investigate and bring to justice: John Brown, Joseph Brown, Simeon Potter, Dr. Weeks, and Richmond.

Wanton responded to this demand by examining the claims made by Briggs. Samuel Tompkins and Samuel Thurston, the proprietors of the Prudence Island farm where Briggs worked, gave testimony challenging his account of June 9. Both men stated that Briggs had been present at work the evening of June 9 and early in the morning on June 10. Additionally, Wanton received further evidence from two other indentured servants working with Briggs, and both stated that Briggs had been present throughout the night in question. Thus, Wanton believed that Briggs was an imposter. Duddingston and Montagu challenged Wanton's assertions, Montagu saying that "it is clear to me from many corroborating circumstances, that he is no imposter." Montagu wrote to the Admiralty September 2, 1772 requesting a dozen Books of Instructions to be sent out, "that the young Gentlemen that are made officers may have no excuse for not knowing their Duty"

=== Whig response ===
Colonial Whigs were alarmed at the prospect of Americans being sent to England for trial, and a committee of correspondence was formed in Boston to consult on the crisis. In Virginia, the House of Burgesses was so alarmed that they also formed an inter-colonial committee of correspondence to consult with similar committees throughout the Thirteen Colonies.

Reverend John Allen preached a sermon at the Second Baptist Church in Boston which utilized the Gaspee affair to warn about greedy monarchs, corrupt judges, and conspiracies in the London government. This sermon was printed seven different times in four colonial cities, becoming one of the most popular pamphlets of Colonial America.

== Legacy ==
Historian Joey La Neve DeFrancesco argues that the Gaspee affair resulted from the desire of the colonial elite in Rhode Island to protect their involvement in the triangular slave trade.

Gaspee Days parade
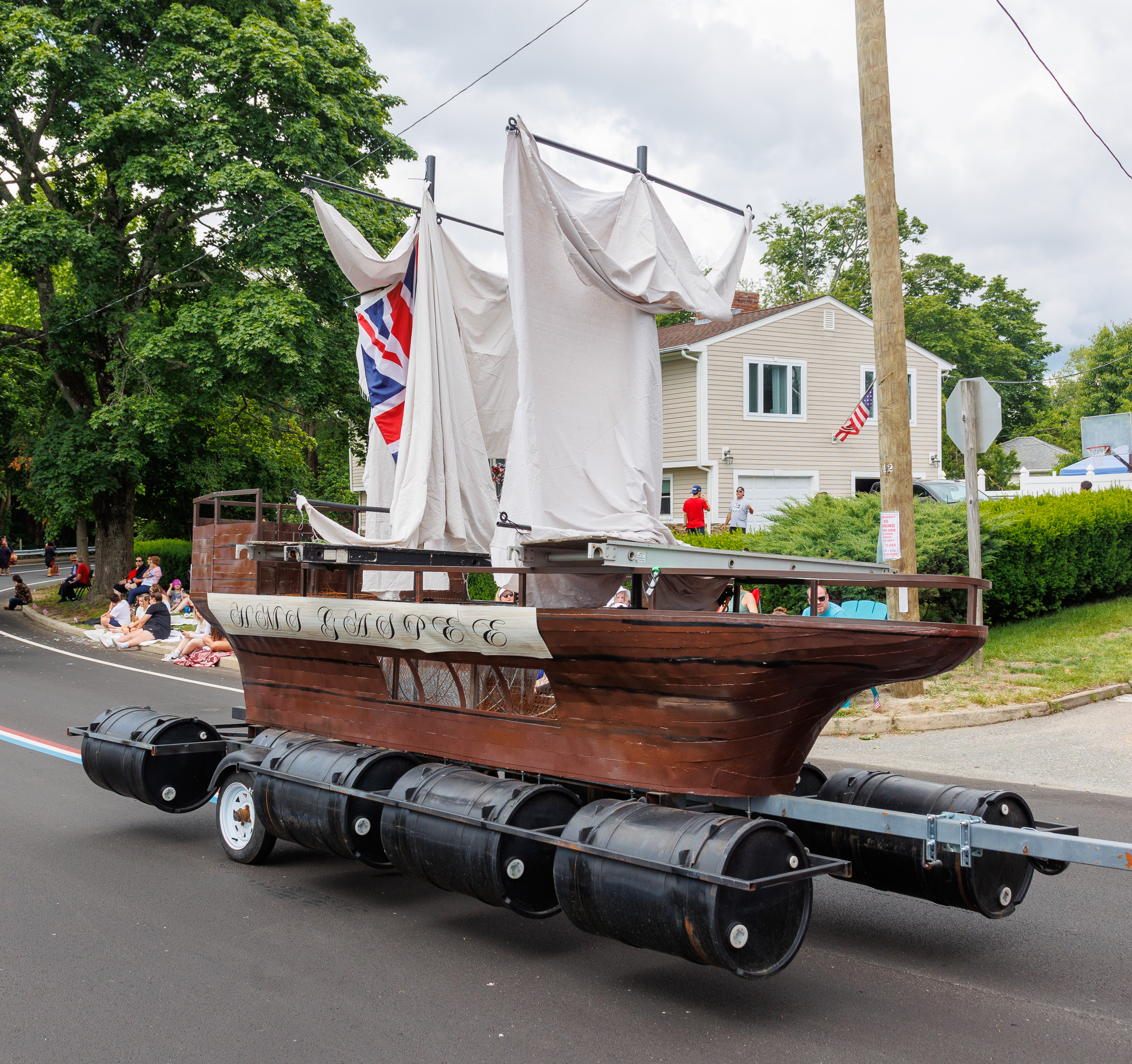
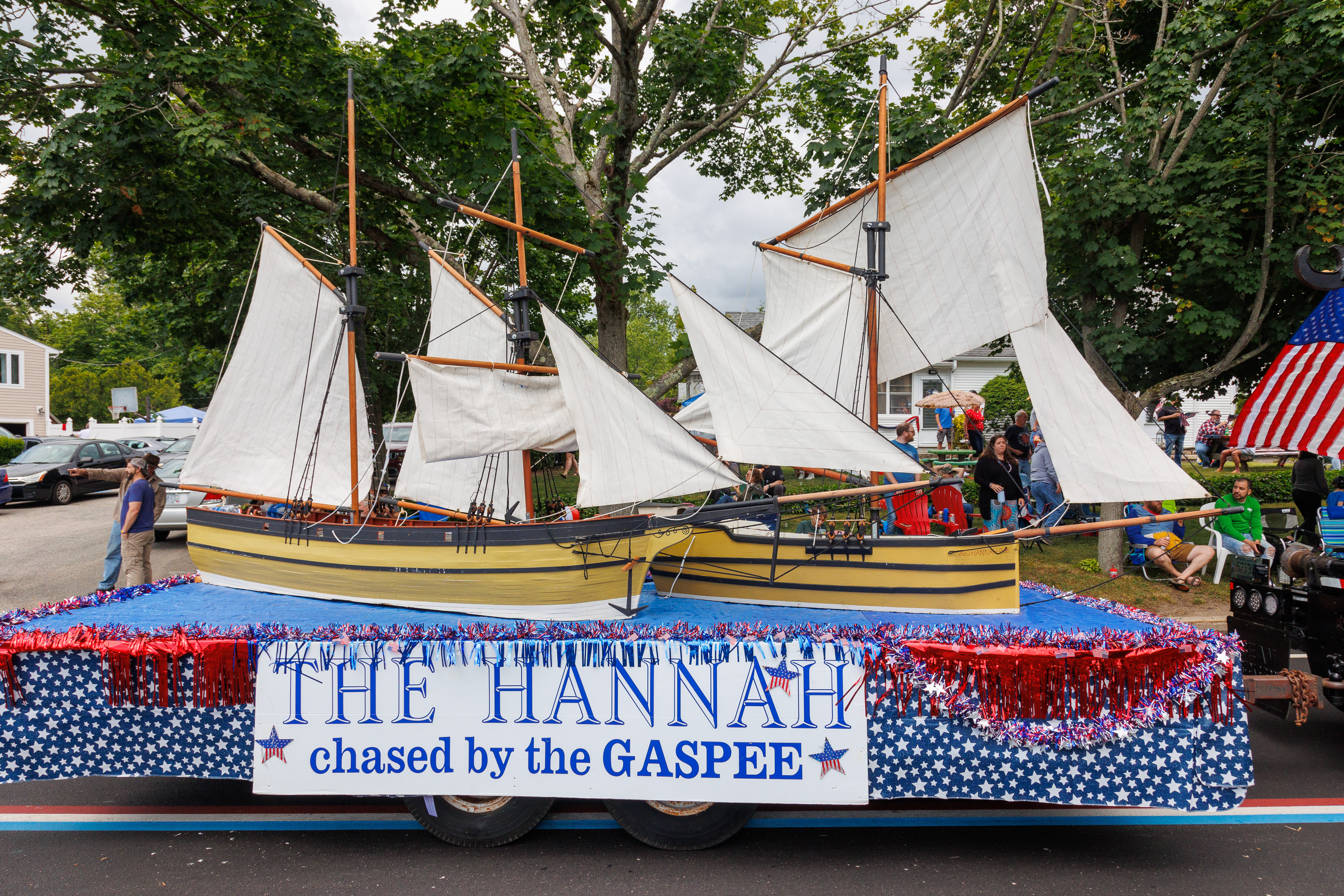
The affair is commemorated annually in Pawtuxet Village's Gaspee Days parade

Pawtuxet Village commemorates the Gaspee affair each year with its Gaspee Days festival and parade. This multi-day event includes fireworks, arts and crafts, and races, but the highlight is a parade, which features burning the Gaspee in effigy and other entertainments.

In 2017, then Rhode Island governor Gina Raimondo signed a bill into law to introduce a Gaspee Days license plate to commemorate the legacy of the event.

== See also ==
- Caroline affair
- HMS Diana

== Sources ==
- Armstrong, Commander Benjamin F. (U.S. Navy) (February 2016). "An Act of War on the Eve of Revolution". Naval History Magazine. Vol. 30, no. 1. Archived from the original on October 24, 2020.
- Barrow, Thomas (1967). Trade and empire; the British customs service in colonial America, 1660-1775. Cambridge, Mass.: Harvard University Press.
- Bartlett, John Russell (1861). A History of the Destruction of His Britannic Majesty's Schooner Gaspee, in Narragansett Bay, on the 10th June, 1772: Accompanied by the Correspondence Connected Therewith; the Action of the General Assembly of Rhode Island Thereon, and the Official Journal of the Proceedings of the Commission of Inquiry, on the Same. A. C. Greene, printer to the state.
- Gravlee, G. Jack, ed. (1976). Pamphlets and the American Revolution : rhetoric, politics, literature, and the popular press. Delmar, New York: Scholar's Facsmiles & Reprints, Inc. ISBN 0-8201-1280-1.
- Leslie, William R. “The Gaspee Affair: A Study of Its Constitutional Significance.” Mississippi Valley Historical Review 39#2 1952, pp. 233–56. JSTOR 1892182.
- Miao, Michelle. “Kindling the Flame of Revolution: Communication and Committees of Correspondence in Colonial America.” The History Teacher 55#1 2021, pp. 121–36. JSTOR 27201481 It was very widely reported in all13 colonies.
- Messer, Peter C. “A Most Insulting Violation The Burning of the HMS ‘Gaspee’ and the Delaying of the American Revolution.” New England Quarterly 88#4 2015, pp. 582–622. JSTOR 24718882
- Morgan, Gwenda, and Peter Rushton. “Arson, Treason and Plot: Britain, America and the Law, 1770-1777.” History 100#3 2015, pp. 374–91. JSTOR 24809702 On the British legal perspectives.
- Park, Steven (2016). The Burning of His Majesty's Schooner Gaspee: An Attack on Crown Rule Before the American Revolution. Westholme Publishing. ISBN 978-1-59416-267-1.
  - Park, Steven H. "The burning of HMS Gaspee and the limits of eighteenth -century British imperial power" (PhD dissertation, U of Connecticut; ProQuest Dissertations & Theses, 2005. 3195552). Argues the controversy awakened the colonists to the threat the British government posed to their liberties.
- Rhoden, Nancy L. ed. English Atlantics Revisited: Essays Honouring Professor Ian K. Steele (McGill-Queen's University Press, 2007), Canadian historians emphasize importance of London's mishandling of the affair in angering Americans.

== Primary sources ==
- Staples, William R. ed. The Documentary History of the Destruction of the Gaspee (Providence: Knowles, Vose, and Anthony, 1845; reprinted 1990). online
