= Anastasie Brown =

Mother Anastasie Brown, S.P.
- Title: General superior

Personal life
- Born: Jane Brown; October 13, 1826 North Arm, Edgar County, Illinois
- Died: August 10, 1918 (aged 91) Saint Mary-of-the-Woods, Indiana
- Resting place: Sisters of Providence Convent Cemetery

Religious life
- Religion: Catholic
- Institute: Sisters of Providence of Saint Mary-of-the-Woods
- Profession: 15 August 1847

Senior posting
- Post: President of Saint Mary-of-the-Woods College
- Period in office: 1868–1874
- Predecessor: Mary Cecilia Bailly, SP
- Successor: Mary Ephrem Glenn, SP

Mother Anastasie Brown, S.P., (October 13, 1826 – August 10, 1918), was the Superior General of the Sisters of Providence of Saint Mary-of-the-Woods, Indiana from 1868 to 1874. During her term, the congregation had financial difficulties stemming from the Panic of 1873. Both prior to and following her time in office, Brown was Directress of the Academy, a women's college run by the Sisters of Providence now known as Saint Mary-of-the-Woods College.

== Early life ==
Born Jane Brown in the small Catholic settlement of North Arm, Edgar County, Illinois, Brown grew up in a religious family under parents Aloysius Brown and Elizabeth Drury. Aloysius, who had moved to North Arm as a Catholic missionary, served as a leader in the town. He was a justice of the peace and also took the community into his home for Sunday prayers when no priest was available. Aloysius also built the church in that town, even teaching himself how to make bricks for the purpose. Later, this brick-making would lead him to do business with the Sisters of Providence and their foundress, Saint Mother Theodore Guerin.

These connections led Aloysius to send his daughter Jane to the Sisters of Providence Academy or Institute for Girls (now Saint Mary-of-the-Woods College) when it opened in 1841. Jane forged a strong relationship with Mother Theodore, who taught her math and astronomy. On January 23, 1844, Jane entered the congregation as a Sister of Providence. Mother Theodore gave her the religious name Sister Anastasie. She became a fully professed sister on August 15, 1847.

Her first mission was to St. Rose in Vincennes, Indiana, in 1847. In January 1849, she with three other sisters opened St. Joseph School in Terre Haute, Indiana. In 1853 she opened the first house at Evansville, and in 1856 she took over as directress at the Academy in Saint Mary-of-the-Woods.

== As Superior General ==
In 1868, she was elected Superior General of the Sisters of Providence and received the title of Mother Anastasie. However, this election was controversial, as her predecessor Mother Mary Cecilia Bailly was quite offended not to have been re-elected. For a brief time, Mother Mary Cecilia and her supporters spoke of separating and starting a new branch of the Sisters of Providence. Even once this plan had faded, the splintering in the community made governing the congregation difficult.

During her second three-year term, Mother Anastasie began work on a hospital in Terre Haute, Indiana. The congregation put many funds and much work into the building and establishment of this hospital. However, anti-Catholic sentiment and lack of support from the community led this project to fail by 1873.

Increasing debts plagued the congregation. The Panic of 1873 began a nationwide depression, and the Sisters found themselves thousands of dollars in debt as a result of large-scale building projects and real estate ventures, both prior to and during Mother Anastasie's administration.

== After administration ==
Mother Anastasie was not re-elected in 1874, and Mother Mary Ephrem Glenn took over as Superior General. Mother Anastasie spent the next seven years working in Lafayette and Madison. In 1881, she returned to her position as Directress of the Academy.

A lover of art and culture, Mother Anastasie thrived in this position. She had studied perspective and mechanical drawing with her father Aloysius, and gained instruction in design, drawing from nature and working in painting and watercolor as a student of Sister St. Francis at Saint Mary-of-the-Woods. At the Academy, Mother Anastasie instituted the Monday Night Program, where the teachers and students would examine examples of the arts, including drawing, writing, needlework, art, poetry, class work, and musical numbers.

Mother Anastasie herself continued as an artist into her old age, creating pencil sketches and paintings, often for use in the sanctuary. She retired to private life in 1896, suffered two strokes, and died at the motherhouse August 10, 1918.

Catholic Church titles
Preceded by Mary Cecilia Bailly, SP	General Superior of the Sisters of Providence of Saint Mary-of-the-Woods; 1868–1874	Succeeded by Mary Ephrem Glenn, SP
Educational offices
Preceded by Mary Cecilia Bailly, SP	President of Saint Mary-of-the-Woods College; 1868–1874	Succeeded by Mary Ephrem Glenn, SP
