= Mary Ephrem Glenn =

Educator and Catholic leader from the USA

Mother Mary Ephrem Glenn, S.P.
- Born: Margaret Glenn; January 21, 1836; Bellefonte, Pennsylvania
- Died: February 1, 1916 (aged 80); Saint Mary-of-the-Woods, Indiana
- Burial place: Sisters of Providence Convent Cemetery, Saint Mary-of-the-Woods, Indiana
- Title: General Superior of the Sisters of Providence of Saint Mary-of-the-Woods
- Predecessor: Mother Anastasie Brown
- Successor: Mother Euphrasie Hinkle
- Parent: Unknown

Mother Mary Ephrem Glenn, S.P. (January 21, 1836 – February 1, 1916) was the Superior General of the Sisters of Providence of Saint Mary-of-the-Woods, Indiana from 1874 to 1883. During her term, she established missions beyond Indiana for the first time and greatly reduced the Congregation's indebtedness, which was partly a result of the Panic of 1873.

She was born Margaret Glenn in Bellefonte, Pennsylvania, in 1836 but grew up in Indiana. Her parochial school in Madison was run by the Sisters of Providence, and the congregation foundress Saint Mother Theodore Guerin visited this mission in 1846. Mother Theodore was impressed by Margaret and gave her a picture representing a child near the Blessed Virgin. Margaret later remarked that this was the beginning of her vocation to become a religious sister.

Margaret later entered the Sisters of Providence and took the name Sister Mary Ephrem. By 1862 she was a fully professed Sister and was sent to work at a school in Loogootee, Indiana. In 1866, due to her way with finances, Sister Mary Ephrem was named the Econome (Treasurer) of the congregation, in charge of all accounting. She also spent time at St. Rose Academy in Vincennes, Indiana.

== As Superior General ==
In 1874, with the congregation struggling with debt and other issues arising from the Panic of 1873, Sister Mary Ephrem was elected Superior General of the Sisters of Providence. From then on she was honored with the title Mother Mary Ephrem.

She was a strong advocate of parochial education. In addition to schools already run by the Sisters of Providence, Mother Mary Ephrem oversaw the opening of seventeen parish schools, though several did not succeed due to lack of financial support by poor congregations. Schools in Michigan, Ohio and Illinois took the Sisters of Providence outside of Indiana for the first time, with the permission of Bishop Jacques-Maurice De Saint Palais. While visiting one of these missions in 1881, Mother Mary Ephrem met and inspired another young student who would grow up to be a Superior General of the congregation, Mother Mary Raphael Slattery.

Mother Mary Ephrem also proved skillful at soliciting donors and regulating spending within the congregation, greatly reducing the debt of the Sisters of Providence.

A special project undertaken during her term was the building of the St. Anne Shell Chapel, a small stone chapel to replace a wooden one built by Mother Theodore to honor Saint Anne after a harrowing trip. The chapel was completed in 1876. Mother Mary Ephrem also began the building of a new novitiate.

After her nine-year term, Mother Mary Ephrem returned to her post as Econome for the congregation in 1883. In 1890, she went to St. Patrick's in Terre Haute, Indiana, which she had founded in 1881. In 1891 she went to teach in Galesburg, Illinois. After various other ministries, Mother Mary Ephrem spent the last ten years of her life at the motherhouse, where she died on February 1, 1916.

Catholic Church titles
Preceded by Anastasie Brown, SP	General Superior of the Sisters of Providence of Saint Mary-of-the-Woods; 1874 - 1883	Succeeded by Euphrasie Hinkle, SP
Educational offices
Preceded by Anastasie Brown, SP	President of Saint Mary-of-the-Woods College; 1874 - 1883	Succeeded by Euphrasie Hinkle, SP
