= Euphrasie Hinkle =

Educator and Catholic leader from the USA

Mother Euphrasie Hinkle, S.P.
- Born: Anna Hinkle; September 15, 1847; Carrollton, Kentucky, U.S.
- Died: August 27, 1889 (aged 41); Saint Mary-of-the-Woods, Indiana, U.S.
- Burial place: Sisters of Providence Convent Cemetery, Saint Mary-of-the-Woods, Indiana
- Title: General Superior of the Sisters of Providence of Saint Mary-of-the-Woods
- Predecessor: Mother Mary Ephrem Glenn, S.P.
- Successor: Mother Mary Cleophas Foley, S.P.
- Parent(s): George D. Hinkle and Lucy S. Hawkins

Mother Euphrasie Hinkle, S.P. (September 15, 1847 – August 27, 1889) was the Superior General of the Sisters of Providence of Saint Mary-of-the-Woods, Indiana, from 1883 to 1889. She was a convert from Methodism. During her term, she established missions of the Sisters of Providence in Chicago, Illinois and Chelsea, Massachusetts. She began building the Church of the Immaculate Conception on the motherhouse grounds in 1886. She died in office August 27, 1889.

== Early life ==
She was born Anna Hinkle in 1847, in Carrollton, Kentucky to George D. Hinkle and Lucy S. Hawkins. Her father was a prominent judge connected with the publishing firm of Wilson, Hinkle and Co. Her mother died when Anna was very young, and she was raised by her father and a paternal aunt. Although the Hinkles were Methodist, George sent his daughters to St. Augustine School, run by the Sisters of Providence. Anna was unhappy with this arrangement and made her displeasure known in school, one day even going so far as to toss all of the classroom books on Christian Doctrine out the window.

However, as her schooling continued, Anna was drawn to Catholicism and soon converted. She entered the Sisters of Providence on July 14, 1864, taking the name Sister Euphrasie, and spent a year at St. John Academy in Indianapolis. After taking her first vows, she became Assistant Mistress of Novices, a position that she held until 1874. She then was appointed Superior of St. Rose Academy in Vincennes, Indiana.

In August 1880, Sister Euphrasie was elected into the general administration of the Sisters of Providence as Second Assistant to Mother Mary Ephrem Glenn. With her background in education, Sister Euphrasie was very helpful in school mission visitations, a yearly required task for Superiors General.

== As Superior General ==
In 1883, Sister Euphrasie was herself elected Superior General of the Sisters of Providence and was called Mother Euphrasie from then on. A priority of her administration was education, not only in schools run by the Sisters but also of the Sisters themselves. During her term she opened numerous schools, including the first Chicago mission of the congregation (St. Philip, now St. Mel) and the first East Coast mission (St. Rose in Chelsea, Massachusetts). She also began building the Church of the Immaculate Conception in her term, working with architects D.A. Bohlen & Son of Indianapolis. The cornerstone was laid on September 14, 1886. (The church was not completed until 1907.) In the elections of 1886, Mother Euphrasie asked to be relieved of her position due to failing health, but she was re-elected. In addition to her personal problems, the motherhouse burned down on February 7, 1889. She died on August 27, 1889, aged 41.

Catholic Church titles
| Preceded by Mary Ephrem Glenn, SP | General Superior of the Sisters of Providence of Saint Mary-of-the-Woods; 1883 - 1889 | Succeeded by Mary Cleophas Foley, SP |
Educational offices
| Preceded by Mary Ephrem Glenn, SP | President of Saint Mary-of-the-Woods College; 1883–1889 | Succeeded by Mary Cleophas Foley, SP |
