= St. Anne Shell Chapel =

Chapel in Saint-Mary-of-the-Woods, Indiana, U.S.

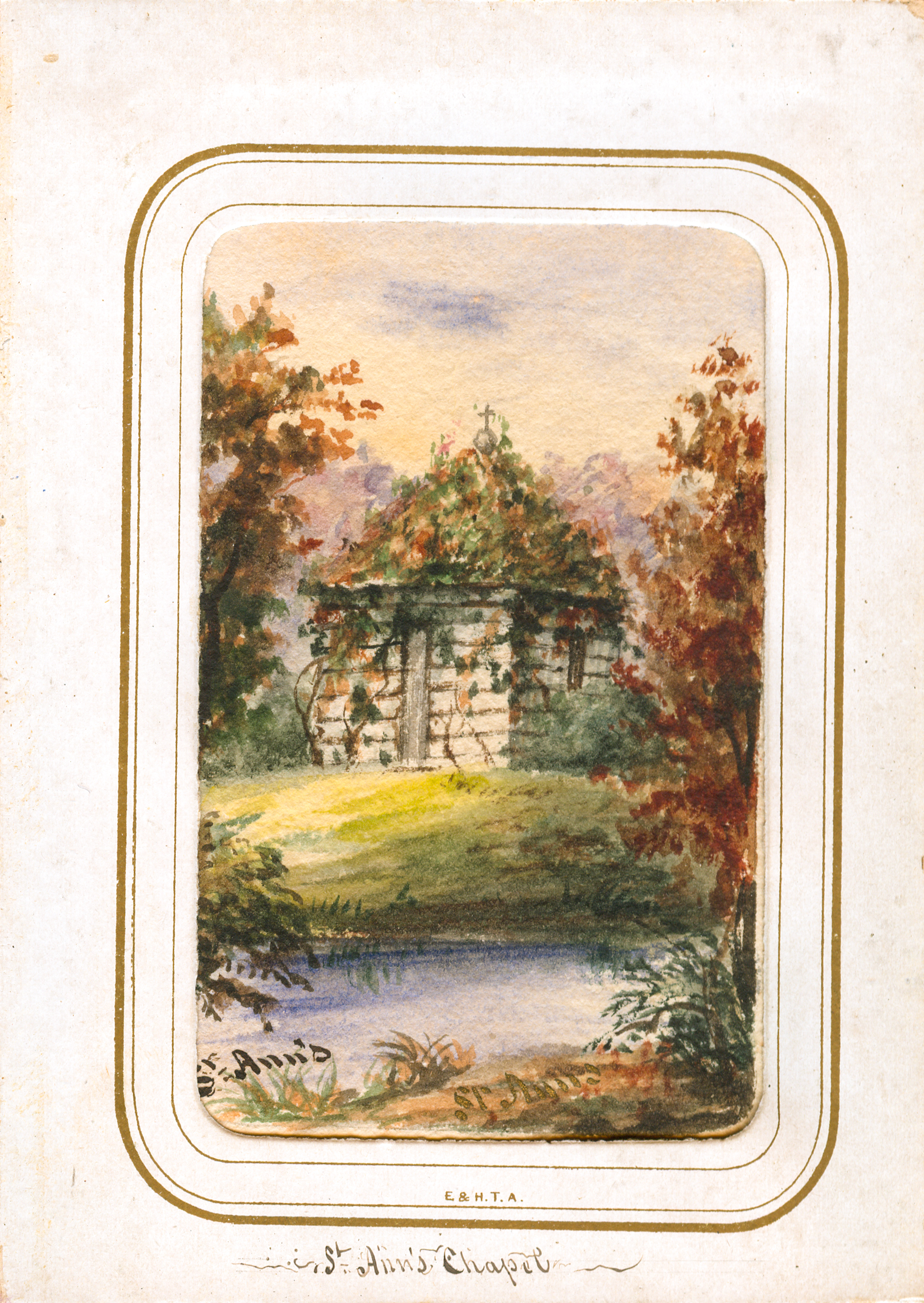

- the Chapel's location in Indiana

Religion
- Affiliation: Roman Catholic
- Diocese: Archdiocese of Indianapolis
- Ecclesiastical or organisational status: Chapel of the Sisters of Providence of Saint Mary-of-the-Woods
- Year consecrated: 1876 (July 25)
- Status: active

Location
- Location: Saint Mary-of-the-Woods, Indiana
- State: Indiana
- Coordinates: 39.50928°N 87.45790°W

Architecture
- Type: Chapel
- Completed: 1876

Specifications
- Direction of façade: west
- Length: 15 ft (4.6 m)
- Width: 15 ft (4.6 m)
- Materials: stone, shells

Website
- http://www.spsmw.org

The St. Anne Shell Chapel at Saint Mary-of-the-Woods, Indiana, is on the motherhouse grounds of the Sisters of Providence of Saint Mary-of-the-Woods. It is known for its interior, which has walls completely covered in seashells forming mosaics and patterns. The small chapel's primary function is as a chapel and shrine in honor of St. Anne.

== History ==
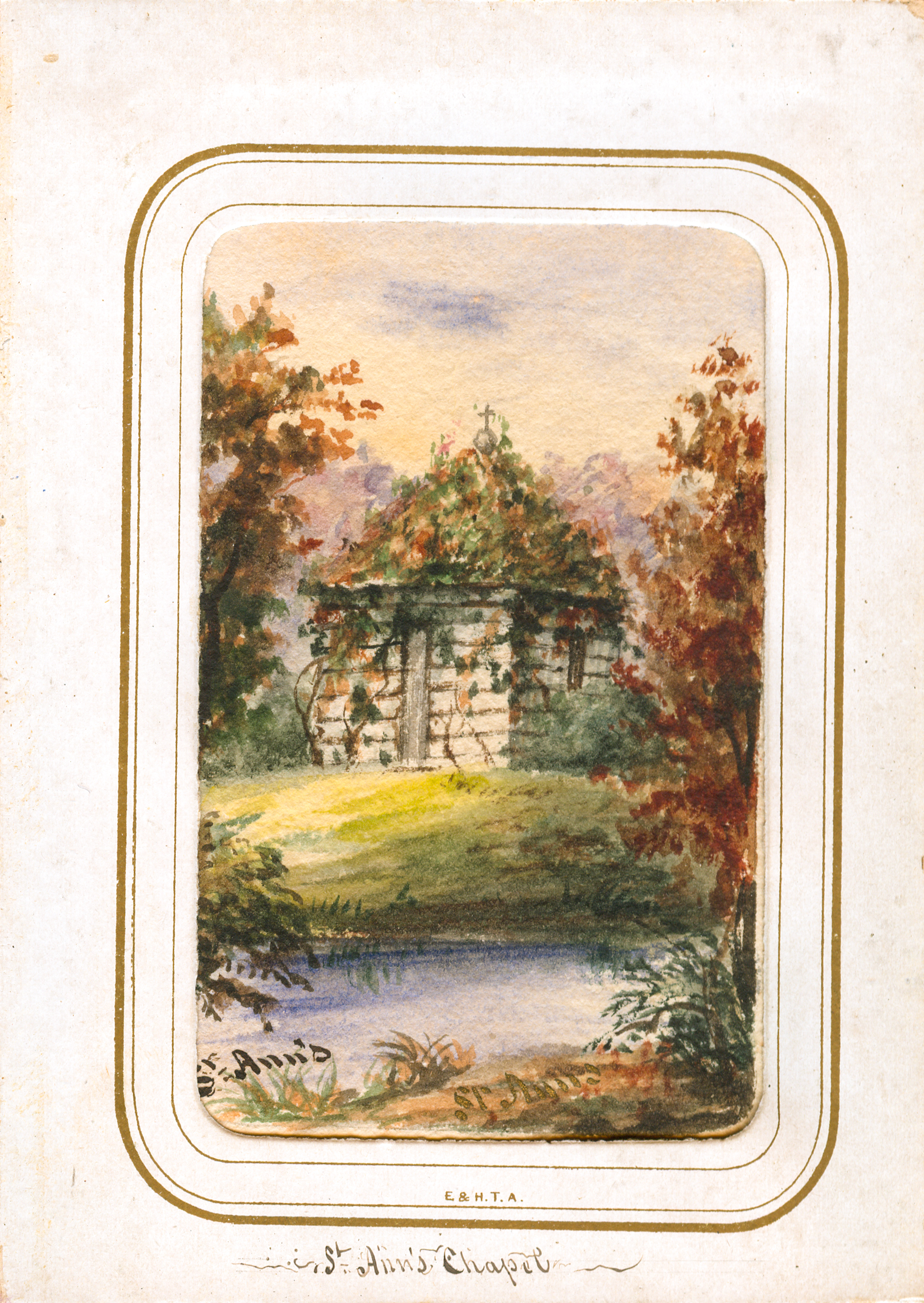
This painting by Mother Mary Cecilia Bailly shows the original chapel, completed in 1844 and torn down in 1875.

In November 1843, congregation foundress Saint Mother Theodore Guerin and Sister Mary Cecilia Bailly were returning from France with three French postulants after a fundraising trip. Sailing on the Nashville, the sisters encountered a fierce storm that threatened to sink the craft. The sisters prayed to the Blessed Virgin Mary and to St. Anne for safety. (Guerin originally hailed from Brittany, France, where St. Anne is honored as patron of sailors.)

Upon returning safely to Saint Mary-of-the-Woods, Guerin had a small log chapel built in honor of St. Anne on a small knoll in the forest of the motherhouse grounds. This chapel was completed in 1844.

After several decades, the logs in this structure began to give way. Under the leadership of General Superior Mother Mary Ephrem Glenn, a sturdier stone chapel was built on the same site with the same 15' by 15' dimensions. This new chapel, called the Shrine of St. Anne but more commonly known as the Shell Chapel, was consecrated on July 25, 1876, with a blessing by a Father Chasse.

Every July 25 since 1844, on the eve of the Feast of St. Anne, the sisters gather for a solemn procession to the chapel in honor of the saint. This procession includes songs and prayers. At its height, when nearly all Sisters of Providence spent the summers at Saint Mary-of-the-Woods, this procession may have included over 1,000 habited sisters.

== Interior and art ==
As the chapel was being built, Sister Mary Joseph Le Fer de la Motte had the idea to line the walls with iridescent river shells from the nearby Wabash River. Shells were collected, mainly by sister novices, from a sandbar at Durkee's Ferry in the river. Le Fer did much of the shell placing herself, setting the shells in soft plaster on the walls.

Several mosaic designs, originally drawn by Guerin and preserved by Le Fer, decorate the walls. These designs include a depiction of the Nashville, a map of Indiana showing the mission established up to 1876, and an illustration of the all-seeing Eye of God. A built-in altar, also covered in shells, holds a statue of St. Anne that Guerin brought from France.

Two, narrow, stained glass windows, one on either side wall, include designs of shell and coral. The floor is tiled with sea green and coral-colored floral patterns, and a painted nautilus border trims the top of the walls.
