= Joseph Bailly =

Joseph Bailly (7 April 1774 – 21 December 1835) was a fur trader and a member of an important French Canadian family that included his uncle, Charles-François Bailly de Messein.

Bailly was one of several Canadian from prominent families who were important in the western fur trade. In 1822, he established a trading post near present-day Porter, Indiana, making him the foremost pioneer of that area.

== Early history and ancestors ==
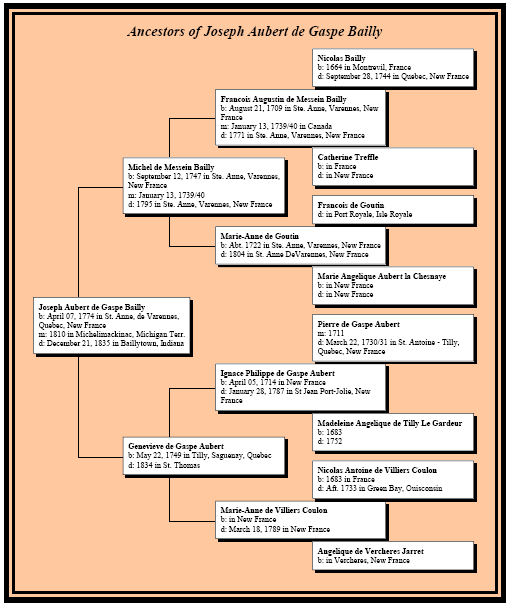
Ancestors of Joseph Bailly

Joseph Bailly was an early fur trader on the Great Lakes. He and his children had significant influence as the region transitioned from English colonialism to frontier expansion of the United States. He was born Honore Gratien Joseph Bailly de Messein on 7 April 1774 in Verchères, Quebec; a village which originated with a land grant to his great-great-grandfather Francois Xavier Jarret, Sieur de Vercheres in 1672. It is located 20 mi (32 km) up the Saint Lawrence River from Montreal, on the opposite bank. Bailly was a sixth–generation French-Canadian, descending from Jehan Terriault and Perrine Brault, who were original colonists in Acadia in 1637. Bailly's great-grandfather Nicholas Antoine Coulon, Sieur de Villiers was a trader and Army officer who was killed by Meskwaki people on the shore of Green Bay, Wisconsin in 1733. His uncle, Father Charles-Francois Bailly de Messein, spent more than twenty years as a Catholic missionary to the Mi'kmaq Indians of Nova Scotia, and was appointed coadjutor Bishop of Quebec in 1788. Following the family interest in the fur trade, Joseph Bailly received an advanced education in Montreal, and served a clerkship with the North West Company. In 1792, at the age of 18, he finished his education, and entered the fur trade at Michilimackinac. Although from a prominent family, they had little money. His father died in 1795, and Joseph became the main support of his mother, younger brother, and sister for several years.

== Fur trader ==
In the winter of 1792–93, Bailly entered into extensive fur trading with Ottawa villages in central Michigan. From 1793 to 1810, his winter residence was a trading post located near an Ottawa village at the foot of the Maple River Rapids, in Lebanon Township, Clinton County. Bailly owned additional trading posts from 1793 to 1822 on Lake Muskego, Muskegon River, Michigan (now Muskegon, Michigan); from 1793 to 1810 in Chig-au-mish-kene village on Grand River (now Lyons, Michigan); from 1807 to 1815, in Parc aux Vaches village on St. Joseph River (south of present-day Niles, Michigan); from 1807 to 1828 on the Calumet River, Indiana; and from 1807 to 1828 on the Kankakee River, Illinois.

== First marriage and expansion of the business ==
Joseph married Angelique McGulpin (Bead-Way-Way or Mecopemequa) in 1794 in Maketoquit's village at the foot of Maple River rapids, Michigan. Angelique was born about 1780 in Chig-au-mish-kene village on Grand River, Michigan. She was a daughter of Maketoquit (Black Cloud), the chief of a large band of Grand River Ottawa. He located his main village in what became Essex Township of Shiawassee County, on the south side of the Maple River, but the band used a winter camp in Lebanon Township of Clinton County (now the village of Maple Rapids) for gathering maple sugar. Children of the marriage were Francis Bailly, born in 1795; Alexis Bailly; born in 1798; and Sophia Bailly, born in 1807. The marriage ended in divorce. Francis remained with Maketoquit's band and Alexis was sent to boarding school in Montreal. Sophia was adopted by a close friend of both parents, fur trader Magdelaine Laframboise, who summered on Mackinac Island and wintered on Grand River (now Lowell, Michigan).

== Second marriage and beginning of a trade empire ==
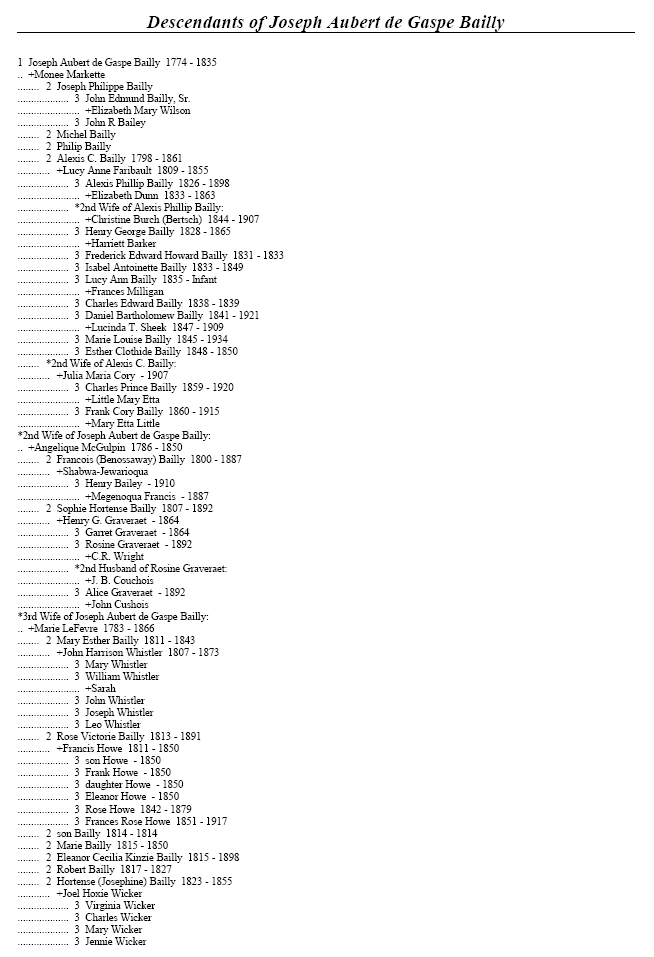
Descendants of Joseph Bailly

Joseph Bailly entered into a financial partnership with Dominic Rousseau of Montreal which dominated the fur trade on the upper Great Lakes out of Mackinac Island and challenged the giant North West Company. Rousseau and Bailly maintained large warehouses on Mackinac and in Montreal; trading in numerous locations with several fleets of voyageurs.

Joseph married Marie Lefevre de La Vigne (Mo-nee or Tou-se-qua) in 1810. She was born in 1783 in Ma-con, a large mixed-band Indian village on the Raisin River west of present Monroe, Michigan. Her mother was a Potawatomi of the St. Joseph Band (now known as the Pokagon Band of Potawatomi Indians). Marie married Kougowma (or Kiogima), also called La Vigne, a medicine man in the Mackinac band of Ottawa, who took her to Mackinac Island. Kougowma died between 1804 and 1809. Bailly adopted the two daughters from this marriage, Agatha born in 1797 and Therese, born in 1803. Five more children were born of this second marriage, who were Esther in 1811, Rose in 1813, Eleanor in 1815, Robert in 1817 and Hortense in 1819.

== Third marriage theory ==
Joseph's marriage to Angelique McGulpin, born circa 1790 at Mackinac, is usually considered to be his first marriage. The marriage is confirmed through Mackinac County marriage records for Mackinac. These records imply that this was not a marriage of an Indian to a Frenchman, but of a mixed-blood to a Frenchman, since marriages with Indians were not recorded. Research also shows that Angelique was the daughter of Patrick McGulpin, a Scottish trader at Mackinac, and not the daughter of a native. Only their daughter, Sophie, is confirmed through baptismal records at Mackinac to be the child of Angelique and Joseph. She was born early in 1807. Their son Francois would remain among his mother's people the Ottawa as a medicine man.

The information stated above as the background of Angelique is ascribed to several researchers to be Bailly's first wife. According to tradition, fur traders would take native wives, whom they would "set aside" when the arrangement was no longer convenient. Being an Indian woman, there probably was never a church marriage. Preliminary research into this first wife has identified her as an Ottawa Woman of the Grand River Ottawa, named Monee. Without a sanctioned marriage, the church allowed a new marriage, to Angelique McGulpin. The evidence for his marriage to Angelique comes from his "third" marriage in 1810. At that time, the church (according to Joseph's daughter) refused to allow a divorce from his "first" (i.e., church–sanctioned) wife. Therefore, Joseph married Marie in a civil ceremony.

Records show that his six children born from 1799 to 1803 were born in camps along the east of Lake Michigan. Angelique would have been age 9 to 13. Since the youngest, Francois, stayed in the Ottawa villages as a medicine man (doctor), it is unlikely that Angelique was the "first wife". Yet most Indian wives were not considered wives. The reference by Joseph's daughter, therefore, would most likely refer to a metis (mixed blood) or French wife, married in the Church. Therefore, it is concluded by some researchers that Joseph had three wives.

Joseph's third wife was Marie LeFevre. She was born at Riviera des Raisins to LeFevre de Gascon and a French and Indian woman, about 1783. When her father died in 1790, the family was driven away from the Detroit area as half-breeds. They returned to her mother's Ottawa people at L'abre Croche. Here, she was married to an Ottawa medicine man named de la Vigne. After having two daughters, she left him because of his spirit worship. Having been raised in the Catholic Church, she sought to rejoin this religion. By 1810, she was at Mackinac, where she met Joseph Bailly. At this time, because of their common religious concerns, they were married in a civil ceremony. Their six children and Alexis would become the living memory of the Bailly family.

== War of 1812 ==
Bailly attempted to avoid involvement in the War of 1812, but found that he could not maintain neutrality. He was a Canadian citizen, and had a huge business headquartered in Montreal. Bailly was appointed a Lieutenant in the Michigan Fencibles, a regiment of Canadian militia, in January 1813. He was seized as a prisoner of war in January 1814, while visiting his post at Parc Aux Vaches (very near the site of today's campus of the University of Notre Dame), by United States militia. He was taken to Fort Detroit and held for two months, until March. Bailly was on Mackinac Island when it was invaded by US forces in July, and was deported with the other Canadian Loyalists to Drummond Island, Canada (now Chippewa County, Michigan), though the Battle of Mackinac Island ended in the retreat of American forces. He sent his eight-year-old daughter Sophia to live with her adopted brother, trader Joseph LaFramboise in Prairie du Chien, Wisconsin, but the war theater soon expanded westward to that village.

== Legal case of Dominique Rousseau ==
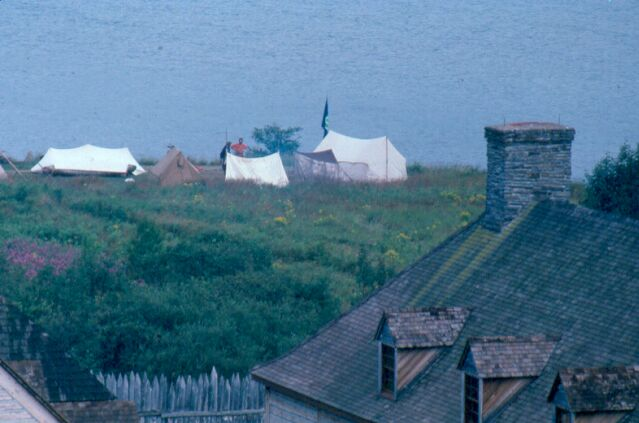
Summer voyageur Encampment at the Grand Portage (1983)

In Montreal, a little-known legal case first asserted American jurisdiction over the lands of northern Minnesota and the upper Great Lakes. It took place in the Court of King's Bench, Register of Common Pleas (District of Montreal), Superior Term, 1803–05, seemingly an unlikely place for a case over the rights of the United States within its own territory to be played out.

Dominique Rousseau and Joseph Bailly were both traders from Montreal in the years prior to the American Revolution. Both were of French Canadian parents. In the summer of 1802, Rousseau and Bailly hired Paul Hervieux of Repetingy (Montreal) to act as bourgeois (partner) and take a canoe under an American license issued at Michilimackinac and to go to Grand Portage. Here they were to trade with the Indians and the canoemen of the other companies.

On July 10 or 12 they arrived in Grand Portage Bay. They were ready for trade by 8:00 a.m. the day after they arrived. They had three "little" tents in a spot some 50 feet from the North West Company canoes and ten feet from the shore.

In testimony by Thomas Forsyth, Esquire, a Montreal trader with the XY Company, and Maurice Blondeau, a "merchant voyageur" since 1752, the area had been cleared by a John Erskine (Askin) in the mid-1750s and there had been a "free right to pitch their tents" in any open area although this area was normally occupied by the North West Company.

Shortly after they had set up camp, Duncan McGillivray and Simon McTavish appeared among their tents and ordered Rastoute, Hervieux's clerk, to move beyond the "little fort". This was the establishment of Mr. Boucher. Boucher ran a small trading post, of the North West Company, for the canoemen. Rastoute, having anticipated this possibility, produced a copy of the American–issued trading license. McGillivray and McTavish replied to the effect that it was not valid at Grand Portage.

Later in the day, McGillivray and McLeod returned to the site of Hervieux's tents. With a group of bourgeois and clerks, McGillivray slashed at the trader's tent and McLeod ordered the traders out. They pulled the stakes from the ground. Michel Robichaux, a voyageur of 25 years, heard McLeod threaten, "if you were at Rat Portage...I would break your neck". McLeod then opened a bale of trade goods and scattered it "to the breezes". McGillivray and McLeod then returned to the stockade.

Hervieux and his men moved their camp beyond the "little fort" of Boucher. Here they remained through the rendezvous. Upon their return to Mackinac, Bailly and Rousseau filed suit for recovery of damaged and lost goods in the courts of Montreal, Quebec. "The Court having heard the parties by their Counsel and duly examined the evidence of Record ... It is Considered that the Plaintiffs do recover the sum of Five Hundred Pounds current money of this province, with costs of suit." Bailly and Rousseau won their case and established the precedence of American rule over these parts of the upper lakes. In the summer of 1804, the North West Company, under its British license, moved its rendezvous from American soil at Grand Portage to Fort William in Thunder Bay, on British soil.

== The pioneer becomes a citizen ==
Joseph Bailly returned to Mackinac Island in 1817 to establish US citizenship, prior to re-entering the fur trading business. By 1820, he was the principal trader on the Calumet River of northern Indiana. In 1822, Bailly moved his young family there. His daughters Agatha and Sophia remained on Mackinac Island. Therese was in school in Montreal, but joined him later. They were the first family of European descent in northern Indiana, and their home became a popular and lively stop for travelers between Chicago and Detroit or Fort Wayne. The family was well known for their refinement and graciousness. The extensive trading post that Bailly established hosted the Indian bands of the region, especially the Potawatomi. His trading influence extended westward to the Sac and Fox villages of Illinois. Bailly purchased over 2,000 acres (8.1 km^{2}) of land, drafting plans for developing a commercial harbor, city and infrastructure at the mouth of the Calumet. The Bailly home was a center of the Catholic faith in northern Indiana, but Joseph also strongly supported the Baptist Carey Mission to the Indians. His wife and daughters also acquired extensive land holdings through treaty grants and skillful speculation. The town of Monee, Illinois in Will County, Illinois is named for Mrs. Bailly.

== Descendants ==
Bailly's son, Francis Bailly, became a medical doctor, and a medicine man of the Grand River Ottawa band. Following the forfeiture of the Ottawa lands on Maple River, Francis, his cousin Maketoquit, and a sub-chief man named Wintagowish purchased the land containing their village on Maple River in an attempt to co-exist with the new inrush of settlers. When it became impossible, they agreed to resettle on a reservation at Elbridge, Oceana County, Michigan.

Alexis Bailly was a prominent pioneer fur trader to the Sioux bands in Minnesota, founding the town of Wabasha and the Wabasha County government, and serving in the Minnesota Legislature.

Daughter Sophia Graveraet and her husband lived on Mackinac, and traded with the Ottawa and Chippewa (Ojibwa) in the region of Grand Traverse Bay. She was the "Indian grandmother" in the tales from the books of Ottawa-Chippewa chronicler John Couchois Wright.

Daughter Agatha Biddle was a leader of the Mackinac Island community, and became chief of the Mackinac band of Chippewa and Ottawa Indians. Her home, which was in her family for several generations, is an historic feature operated by Mackinac Island State Park since 1959, which demonstrates life on the island from the early fur trade era.

Therese Nadeau died as a young mother, at the Bailly homestead in Indiana. Her sons, all traders, became leaders at the Prairie Band Potawatomi Indian Reservation, where the Prairie Band of Potawatomi Indians were sent, and pioneers of Shawnee County, Kansas.

Esther Whistler was in charge of the fledgling stages of Bailly's grand development called Baillytown, which ceased on her sudden death in 1842. Her trader husband and sons followed the relocation of the Sac and Fox tribe, and were pioneers of the towns of Burlington, Coffey County, Kansas and Stroud, Lincoln County, Oklahoma.

Rose Howe was the wife of an early Chicago banker and entrepreneur, a New Englander named Francis Howe, who died alongside three of their children in a cholera outbreak in Chicago during the summer of 1850. Following his early death, Rose and her mother became active investors in Chicago's commercial development. From 1869 to 1874, Rose and her daughter Frances extensively toured Catholic shrines of Europe and the Middle East.

Eleanor became Mother Mary Cecilia Bailly of the Sisters of Providence of Saint Mary-of-the-Woods, based near Terre Haute, Indiana. She was a protege of foundress Saint Théodore Guérin, and succeeded her as a leader of the order. Her biography of Saint Mother Guerin, published posthumously, was part of the formal evidence supporting canonization in October 2006.

Robert Bailly died in childhood, while a student at Carey Mission.

Josephine Bailly married Chicago businessman and developer Joel H. Wicker, one of two brothers for whom Wicker Park and the Wicker Park neighborhood are named. One of his many projects was to clear the lands acquired by Joseph Bailly, subdividing them and selling farmsteads to pioneering families of modest means. She also died as a young mother.

== Bailly's death and legacy ==
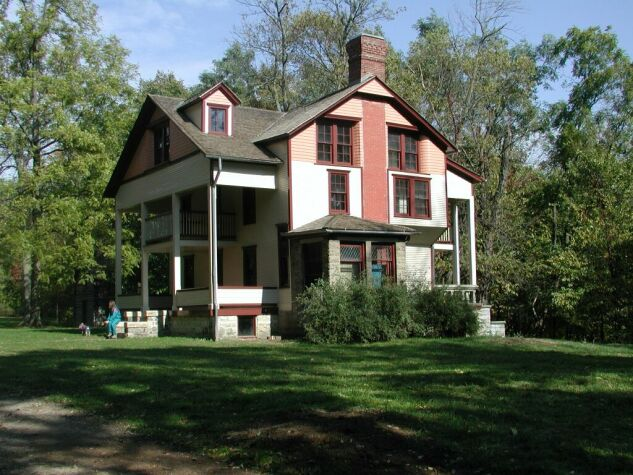
Home in Porter County, Indiana

Joseph Bailly died of illness on 21 December 1835 in his home in Porter County, Indiana, and was buried in the family cemetery nearby. The trading post, family home and cemetery remained in the family through three generations, until after 1918. They became focal historic features of the Indiana Dunes National Lakeshore in 1966, which became the Indiana Dunes National Park in 2019, and are currently in use demonstrating everyday life and culture before the settlement of Indiana by people of European origin. Nearby Chellberg Farm, part of the original Joseph Bailly land holdings which was purchased from Joel Wicker by a Swedish immigrant family from Chicago, showcases life from the subsequent pioneer period. The Joseph Bailly Homestead became a National Historic Landmark in 1962. It was included in the new Indiana Dunes National Lakeshore in 1966.

Joseph Bailly is the subject of two published semi-fictional biographies. The Story of a French Homestead in the Old Northwest, by his granddaughter Frances Howe (1907), is a wildly inaccurate and romanticized version of the family story. Howe, who was partially raised on the Bailly homestead, was an extremely pious and probably racist woman who wrote devotional literature for the Catholic Diocese of South Bend. Her book reads in part like a religious tract. Howe, who has been described as a "swarthy" Indian and a middle-aged spinster, reportedly acted superior to her immigrant neighbors living next to the homestead and gradually became a recluse. (It is told that children from the neighboring Chellberg farm would come over and peek in the window and make faces at her, calling her an old Indian.) In order to be accepted into society in turn-of-the-century Indiana, Howe was prepossessed with making her family seem "white" and properly Catholic, and seems to have written the book in order to give the family acceptable genealogical and moral credentials.

In her attempt to literally whitewash much of the family history, Howe reportedly had the bones of many Native Americans who had been buried in the large grave around her grandparents disinterred. With her adopted daughter Emma Cecilia Bachmann (an orphan from Terre Haute), Howe had also attempted to turn the Bailly homestead into a girls' school but failed. Emma married in 1908 (marriage certificate #39900 in Jackson County, MO) and moved to Los Angeles. Her adopted mother died while living with her in California in 1917.

The Bailly family was also celebrated in the book Wolves Against The Moon, by Julia Cooley Altrocchi (1940); and several pamphlets and papers.

== Research continues ==
In 2005, teams under the direction of Valparaiso University professor Randa Duvick began translating Joseph Bailly's 1799-1802 fur trade business account book from the original French language. Viewing the account book as an important historic resource, Duvick has compared the translation to an archaeological dig, revealing rarely discovered intricate detail about everyday life over the large areas of Michigan, Indiana, and Illinois that Bailly covered in his trade.

== See also ==
- French language
- Fort Mackinac
- Fort Michilimackinac
- Indiana Dunes National Lakeshore
- Joseph Bailly Homestead
- Michilimackinac
- Straits of Mackinac
- Mary Cecilia Bailly

== Sources ==
1. Olga Mae Schiemann, From A Bailly Point of View, An introduction to the first pioneer family of northwestern Indiana, Chicago, Illinois, 1952. Issued as a Duneland Historical Society Publication, August 1955.,
2. Howe, Frances Rose 1851–1817, The Story Of A French Homestead In The Old Northwest, James Dowd Publishers - Bowie, Maryland 1907 / repub. Heritage Books 1999.
3. Altrocchi, Julia Cooley, Wolves Against The Moon, MacMillan Company, New York 1940.
4. David R. Frederick from National Park Service Research Records and Press Releases, Bailly Cemetery - Porter County, Indiana - Enumeration, not published - compiled and reported to Porter County, Indiana Genweb 20 November 2002.
5. A.L. Spooner, Muskegon River Trading Posts
6. From: R D Winthrop e-mail: rdwinthrop@a1access.netFrom: R D Winthrop rwinthrop@laaccess.net, Re: Nishnawbe Roll call : Lamarandier, NISHNAWBE-L@rootsweb.com.
7. The Society (newsletter), Ionia County Historical Society, Ionia, Michigan
8. Samuel Abbott, Justice of the Peace, Michigan Voyageurs from the Notary Book of Samuel Abbott, Mackinac Island, 1807-1817
9. Electronic Land Patent Images, BLM-GLO Records - US Bureau of Land Management, Washington, DC
10. "2 Michigan Historical Society - Lansing, Michigan, Collections and Researches Made By The Michigan Pioneer Historical Society - Vol. 16
11. H. Butler, Commandant, U.S. Army Travel Pass for Joseph Bailly - War of 1812
12. R. David Edmunds, The Potawatomis: Keepers of the Fire. .Sources Cited: 1. Anthony Butler to the Secretary of War, January 23, 1814, Potawatomi file, Great Lakes Indian Archives 2. John Whistler to McArthur, July 1, 1814, Potawatomi file, Great Lakes Indian Archives 3. Wisconsin Historical Collections, Vol. X, page 112 and Vol. XIX, pages 159–60.
13. US Census Bureau, 1820 Federal Census of Indiana, Index only........Bailey, Joseph
14. US Census Bureau, 1820 Federal Census for Michigan
15. State Historical Society of Wisconsin, Collections of the State Historical Society of Wisconsin. Volume 11LIST OF TRADERS
16. City of Valparaiso, History of Valparaiso, Porter County, Indiana
17. Howe, Frances Rose 1851–1817, The Story Of A French Homestead In The Old Northwest.
18. Chicago Democrat newspaper, Chicago, Illinois.
19. National Register of Historic Places - Indiana, Porter County
20. National Park Service staff, National Park Service - Indiana Dunes National Lakeshore - Bailly Homestead
21. St. Joseph Co., Indiana, U. S. Census 1830, Washington DC: National Archives micropublication M19-26, page 417, Joseph Bailly household."Joseph Bailly, 1M 50-60."
22. US Bureau of Indian Affairs, compiled and edited by Charles J. Kappler, Clerk to the Senate Committee on Indian Affairs, Treaty of Camp Tippecanoe, Indiana with the Potowatomie - October 20, 1832, Indian Affairs, Laws and Treaties, Volume II (Treaties) - Government Printing Office, Washington, 1904, 7 Stat. 378, Proclamation Jan 21, 1833.
23. George B. Porter, Thomas J.V. Owen and William Weatherford, Commissioners, Treaty With The Chippewa, Etc., 1833, Indian Affairs - Laws and Treaties - Vol. II (Treaties); compiled by Charles J. Kappler, Washington 1904, Schedule A (Kappler page 406), 26 Sep 1833, Parmly Billings Library, 510 N. Broadway, Billings Montana 59101, 70 3285 572 UR.
24. File contributed by Deb Haines, Directory City of Chicago. 1896. - OBITUARY
25. Martha Miller, Joseph Bailly, Dunes Settler, Shirley Heinze Land Trust - Publications—444 Barker Road - Michigan City, IN 46360. Joseph Bailly, Dunes Settler By Martha Miller, Illustrated by Joyce Keane and Dale Fleming, revised edition 1987, paperback, 22 pages.
26. United States. Office of Indian Affairs, Census Register of all the Men, Women and Children within the 6th Article of the Treaty made with the Ottawa and Chippewa, Washington DC: National Archives publication: RG no. 75, List no. 412. Copies from microfilm at Clarke Historical Library, Central Michigan University, Mt. Pleasant, Michigan.
27. Ionia County Historical Society, Ionia County History, Section Three - The First Whites
28. Multi-Mag, Inc., USA City Link - Lyons, Michigan 48851
29. United States. Office of Indian Affairs, Census Register of all the Men, Women and Children within the 6th Article of the Treaty made with the Ottawa and Chippewa, List no. 412.
30. US Indian Bureau, pursuant to the Treaty signed at Washington, 1836, 1836 Mixed Blood Census of Michigan, Provided by Lowell Koslosky, Petoskey, Michigan from the original roll.
31. William Hull, Governor of the State of Michigan and Thirty Chiefs of the Tribes, Treaty With The Ottawa, Chippewa, Wyandot and Potowatomi - 1808
32. Ghislane Bartolo and Lynn Waybright Rheume - 1988 Custombook, Inc. Tappan, NY, The Cross Leads Generations On. A Bicentennial Retrospect, St. Mary of the Immaculate Conception, Local Catholic Church History and Catholic Ancestors
33. Costello, Joan and Canright, Betty, The Bailly Women - presented to the Duneland Historical Society at the Chesterton Library Service Center on 21 Feb 2002, Duneland Historical Society
34. Grants and titles recorded at the Indiana State Land Office, Indian Reserve Lands of Indiana
35. US Bureau of Indian Affairs, compiled and edited by Charles J. Kappler, Clerk to the Senate Committee on Indian Affairs, Treaty of Camp Tippecanoe, Indiana with the Potowatomie - October 20, 1832.
36. US Bureau of Indian Affairs, compiled and edited by Charles J. Kappler, Clerk to the Senate Committee on Indian Affairs, Treaty of the Tippecanoe River, Indiana with the Potowatomie - October 27, 1832, Indian Affairs, Laws and Treaties, Volume II (Treaties) - Government Printing Office, Washington, 1904, 7 Stat. 399, Proclamation Jan 21, 1833.
37. Richard C. Schmal, Pioneer History - Early Mail Routes
38. Monee Chamber of Commerce, History of Monee, Will County, Illinois
39. Government of the incorporated Village of Monee, Illinois, A Rich Past - History of Monee
40. Richard C. Schmal, Pioneer History - Early Lake County Travels: (from the Nov. 29, 1989, Lowell Tribune, page 8)
41. Wright, John Couchois, Chicago-Jig: The Authentic Indian Tradition of the Happy Hunting Ground-, Handwritten edition, on thin sheets of cedar bound with leather thongs, presented to Michigan Governor Fred W. Green, Clarke Historical Library, Central Michigan University, Mt. Pleasant, Michigan 48859.
42. Valparaiso University Speakers Bureau, Valparaiso, Indiana 46383-6493 and Dr. Randa Duvick - Professor, foreign languages and literatures
43. Brown, Mary Borromeo (1949). History of the Sisters of Providence of Saint Mary-of-the-Woods: Volume I. Saint Mary-of-the-Woods, Indiana: Sisters of Providence. pp. 125–150.
