= Irma Le Fer de la Motte =

French-American nun

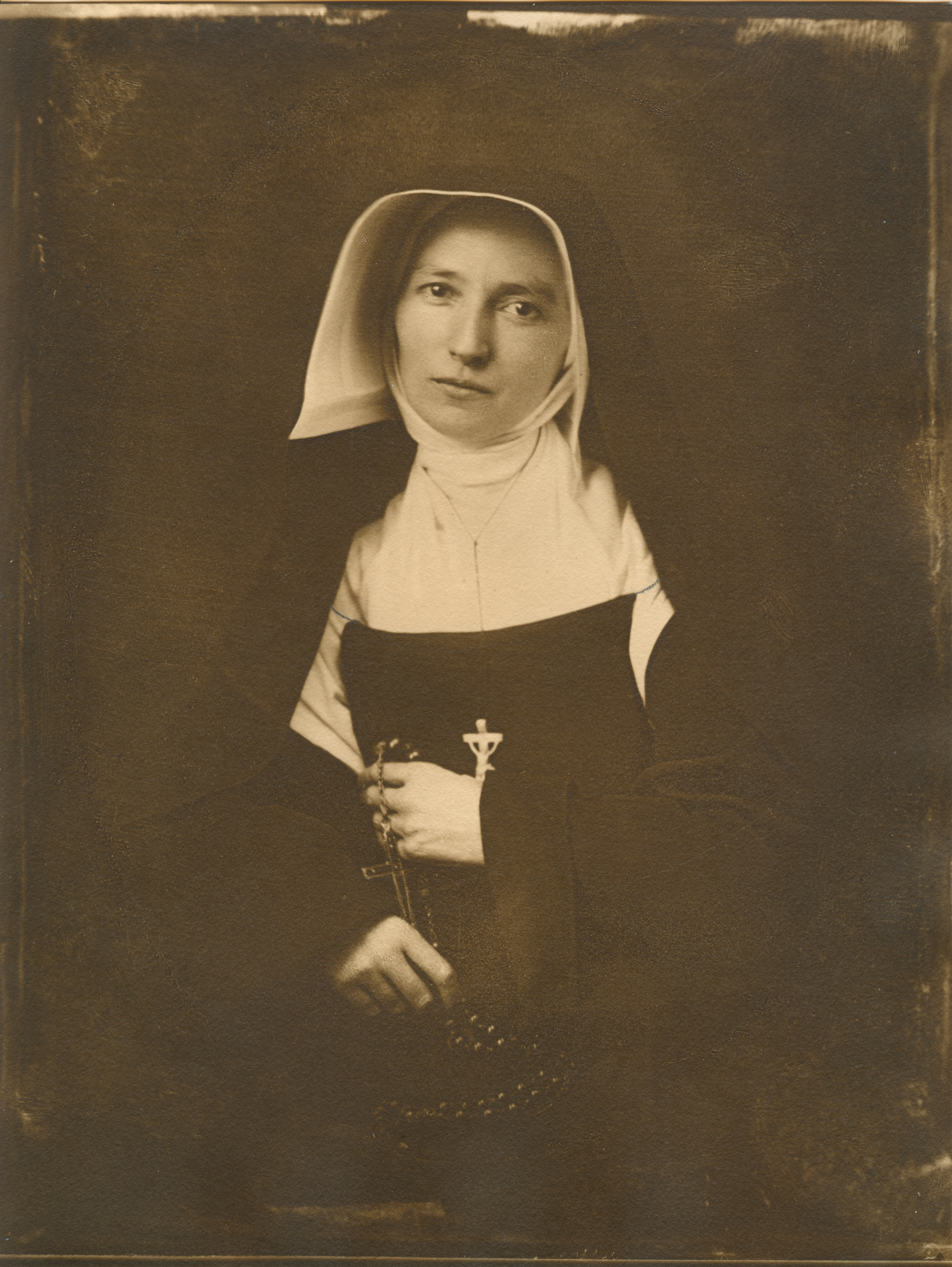
Irma Le Fer de la Motte(Sister St Francis Xavier Le Fer)

Irma Le Fer de la Motte (15 April 1816 – 31 January 1856), also called as Sister Saint Francis Xavier Le Fer was a French-American nun.

== Biography ==
Born on 15 April 1816 at Saint-Servan, Irma Le Fer de la Motte was the fourth of twelve children of Charles Le Fer de la Motte and Eugenie de Ginguene. Her early education was scant. She learned from an informal school run by an elderly woman, and also from an English woman who lived in the town.

She joined Sisters of Providence (Ruillé-sur-Loir, France), in 1839, where she was given a religious name as Sister Francis Xavier. On 17 November 1841 she arrived to Sisters of Providence of Saint Mary-of-the-Woods, Indiana, where she served for fourteen years until her death. At Sisters of Providence, she also held important leadership positions including novice mistress. She assisted Saint Theodora Guerin, the founder of Sisters of Providence of Saint Mary-of-the-Woods, in discharging her administrative responsibilities.

She died in Saint Mary-of-the-Woods on 31 January 1856.
