= Mary Cecilia Bailly =

American Catholic leader (1815–1898)

Mother Mary Cecilia Bailly
- Title: Superior general

Personal life
- Born: Eleanor Cecilia Kinzie Bailly; June 2, 1815 Mackinac County, Michigan
- Died: August 2, 1898 (aged 83) Terre Haute, Indiana
- Resting place: Sisters of Providence Convent Cemetery, Saint Mary-of-the-Woods, Indiana

Religious life
- Religion: Catholic
- Institute: Sisters of Providence of Saint Mary-of-the-Woods

Senior posting
- Period in office: 1856–1868
- Predecessor: Saint Mother Theodore Guerin
- Successor: Mother Anastasie Brown

Mother Mary Cecilia Bailly, S.P., (June 2, 1815 – August 2, 1898) was the Superior General of the Sisters of Providence of Saint Mary-of-the-Woods, Indiana from 1856 to 1868, directly succeeding the congregation's foundress Saint Mother Theodore Guerin. During her time in office, she began rebuilding the Academy (now Saint Mary-of-the-Woods College) and sent Sisters of Providence to staff military hospitals in Indianapolis and Vincennes, Indiana during the American Civil War.

She was born Eleanor Cecilia Kinzie Bailly in Mackinac County, Michigan, on June 2, 1815. Her father was Joseph Aubert de Gaspé Bailly de Messein, a Canadian fur magnate of French descent, and her mother was Marie Le Fèvre de la Vigne (Tou-se-qua), a member of the Ottawa tribe. When Eleanor was seven, the family moved to the Joseph Bailly Homestead, Porter County, Indiana. This homestead was much traveled by various Native American tribes, including the Menominee, Ho-Chunk, Meskwaki and Dakota Sioux.

A priest named John Guegeuen celebrated Mass at this homestead and directed Eleanor to the Sisters of Providence. Eleanor entered the community on November 25, 1841, at which time she became known as Sister Mary Cecilia. In 1843 she was selected to accompany Mother Theodore on a fundraising trip to France. The pair left Saint Mary-of-the-Woods on April 26, 1843, and sailed to France, where they spent time with the Sisters of Providence of Ruillé-sur-Loir. The sisters there, who expected a "savage", were impressed by Bailly's education and fluent French. Guerin and Bailly also met with dignitaries including Maria Amalia of the Two Sicilies, Queen of France.

Upon returning, Bailly spent time teaching at the Academy, now Saint Mary-of-the-Woods College, and took full administrative charge of the institute in 1848.

== As Superior General ==
Bailly became Superior General of the Sisters of Providence in 1856 upon the death of Mother Theodore, earning the title of Mother Mary Cecilia. During her administration, she sent Sisters of Providence to staff schools in many Indiana towns including Washington, New Albany, Cannelton, Fort Wayne, Indianapolis, Loogootee, Vincennes and Lafayette.

In 1858, Mother Mary Cecilia secured the services of Diedrich A. Bohlen, an architect from Indianapolis, to construct a new building for the Academy and several other buildings the congregation needed, including a bakehouse and a greenhouse. A small, temporary chapel was also built to fill the Sisters' needs until a more permanent and majestic structure could be built. (The Church of the Immaculate Conception, this later, permanent structure, was not consecrated until 1907.)

By May 1861, Indiana was mired in the American Civil War and the wounded troops were in need of care. Indiana governor Oliver Morton called upon Mother Mary Cecilia to provide Sisters of Providence as nurses. On May 17, 1861, the Sisters took over administrative duties at Military Hospital in Indianapolis. The Sisters were in charge of washing, cooking and cleaning, and several Sisters served as nurses. The Sisters of Providence are now honored by a monument in Washington, D.C., dedicated to the Nuns of the Battlefield of the Civil War.

Mother Mary Cecilia became known for her decisiveness and firm leadership, which drew some Sisters to her and caused others to look upon her unfavorably. In the congregation's elections of 1868, Mother Mary Cecilia did not receive dispensation to continue as Superior General and Sister Anastasie Brown was named instead.

This situation was seen as an insult to Mother Mary Cecilia and caused controversy within the community, some of whom viewed Brown, now known as Mother Anastasie, to be a usurper. For some time, there was talk of creating a new branch of the Sisters of Providence, with Mother Mary Cecilia in charge, on the old Bailly Homestead Porter County, Indiana. However, with the 1874 election of a new Superior General, Mother Mary Ephrem Glenn, these plans ceased and the community returned to a mostly united group. In 1880, Mother Mary Cecilia went to serve at St. Ann's Orphanage in Terre Haute, Indiana. She remained there, caring for the orphans, as well as writing a biography of Saint Mother Theodore Guerin, which was left unfinished at her death in 1898.

== Legacy ==
Bailly is buried in the Sisters of Providence Convent Cemetery at Saint Mary-of-the-Woods.

Catholic Church titles
Preceded by Saint Mother Theodore Guerin	General Superior of the Sisters of Providence of Saint Mary-of-the-Woods; 1856 - 1868	Succeeded by Anastasie Brown, SP
Educational offices
Preceded by Saint Mother Theodore Guerin	President of Saint Mary-of-the-Woods College; 1856 - 1868	Succeeded by Anastasie Brown, SP
