= Ann Joseph Morris =

American nun and beekeeper (1847–1930)

Sister Ann Joseph Morris
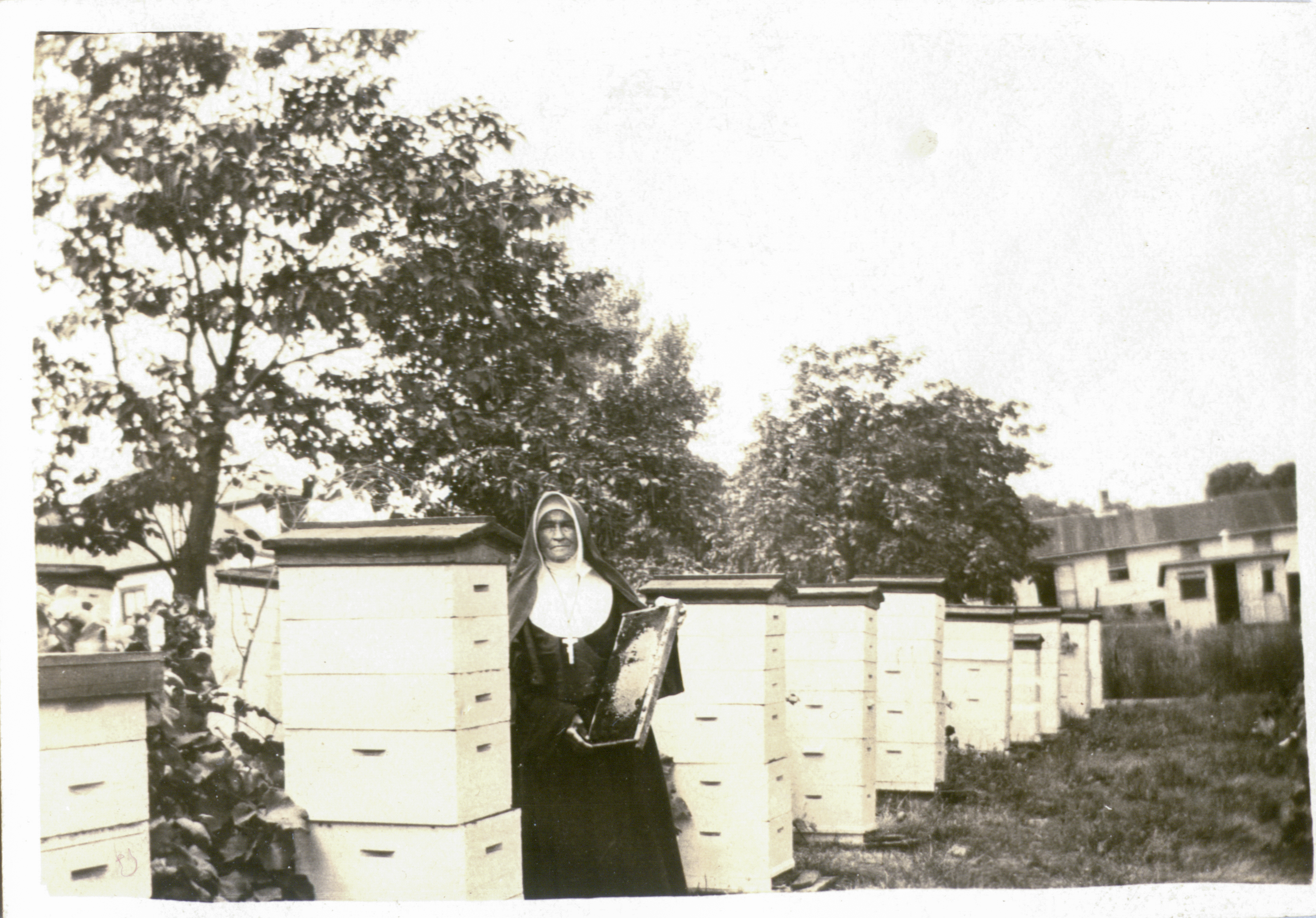
- Sister Ann Joseph Morris, Keeper of the Bees, between 1871 and 1920
- Born: Sarah Morris; November 7, 1847; Loogootee, Indiana, U.S.
- Died: March 8, 1930 (aged 82)
- Occupations: bee keeper, farmer, nun

Sister Ann Joseph Morris (1847-1930) was a nun and member of the Sisters of Providence of Saint Mary-of-the-Woods, located in Saint Mary-of-the-Woods, Indiana who was keeper of the bees. Born Sarah Morris on November 7, 1847, at Loogootee, Indiana, she joined the order on August 18, 1871, at the age of 24. She was one of four sisters, all of whom were converts to the Roman Catholic faith. Previously she had been a school teacher and continued to teach in elementary schools run by the sisters in both Indiana and Michigan after joining the order. She was reassigned to the nascent apiary at Rosary Hill in the early 1880s due to poor health. As a "Keeper of the Bees" for the apiary located at the convent, Sister Ann taught many novice beekeepers of Indiana and her operation was a popular site to visit by local beekeeping associations. She was also admired for her capable management of the convent's poultry farm.

Morris died on March 8, 1930.

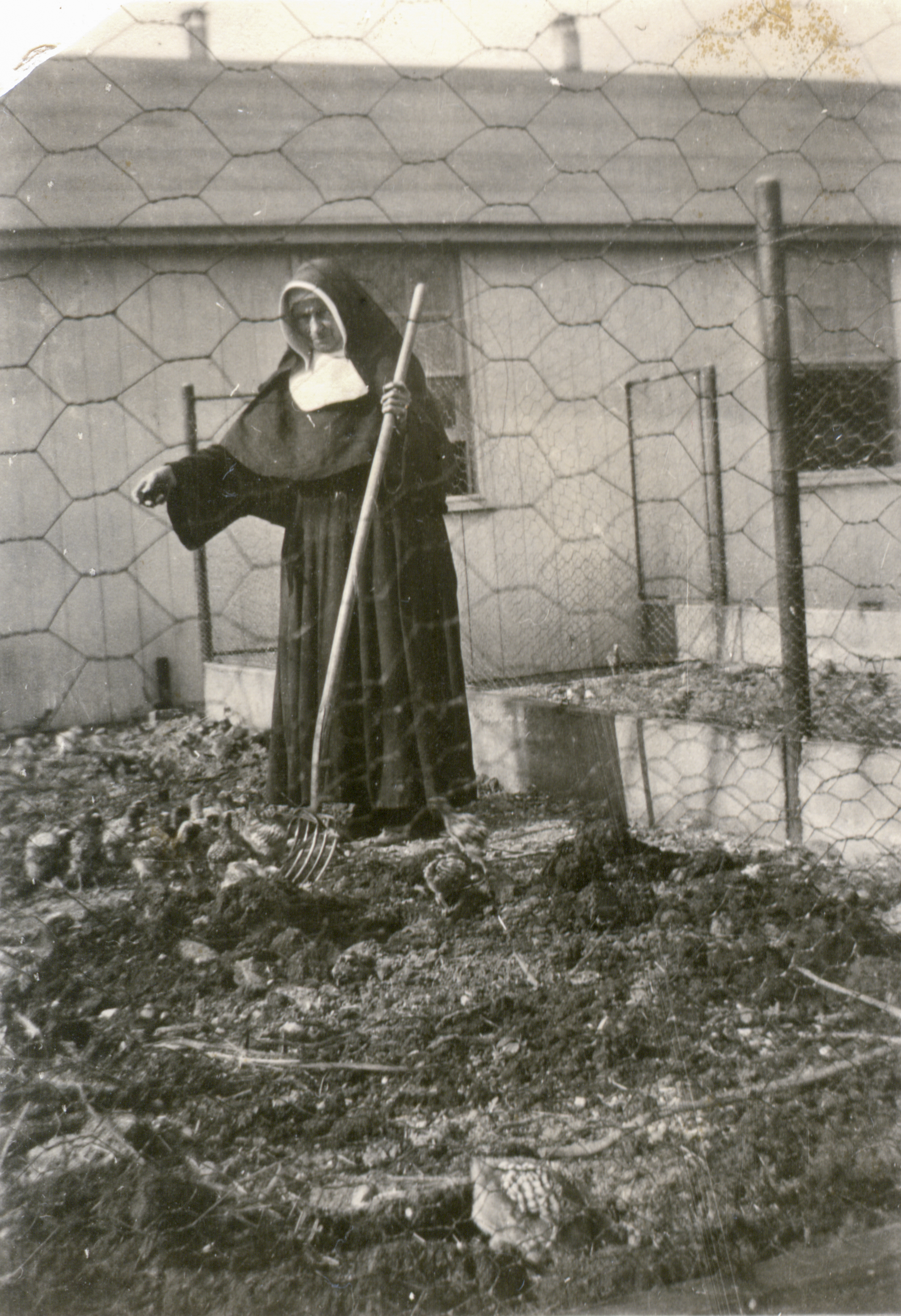
Sister Ann working with chickens at Saint Mary-of-the-Woods.
