= Saint Mother Théodore Guérin (Clark) =

Statue by Teresa Clark in Washington, D.C., U.S.

- Artist: Teresa Clark (sculptor)
- Year: 2006
- Type: Indiana limestone
- Dimensions: 200 cm (78 in)
- Location: Washington, D.C., United States; 38°55′28.57″N 77°0′22.86″W
- Owner: Basilica of the National Shrine of the Immaculate Conception

Saint Mother Théodore Guérin is a public Artwork by American artist Teresa Clark, located at the Basilica of the National Shrine of the Immaculate Conception in Washington, D.C., United States. This statue serves as a memorial to Théodore Guérin and was a gift from the Sisters of Providence of Saint Mary-of-the-Woods.

== Description ==
The statue is a full body portrait of Guérin standing at 6 1/2 feet tall. It is made of Indiana limestone and shows her wearing a traditional Catholic nun's habit. A rosary hangs from her waist and she stares straight ahead. Her proper left arm is pulled to her chest holding the cross that hangs from her neck. Her proper right arm is outstretched in front of her with her hand open as if reaching out to hold someone's hand. Her proper right foot steps out in front her. The statue stands on top of a limestone base which stands on a granite base and is surrounded by flowers.

== Artist ==
Teresa Clark moved from Fort Wayne, Indiana, to Terre Haute, Indiana, in the spring of 2005 and shortly thereafter she was commissioned to create the statue of Guérin. As a non-religious person she was moved by the story of Guérin and in 2006 Clark was baptized Catholic at the age of 50.

The sculpture was carved by master stone carver Nick Fairplay from Oberlin, Ohio.

== Information ==
Clark credits the commission as clearing problems up in her life, hence her conversion to Catholicism. Creating the sculpture from clay Clark described the process of creation in relation to Guérin: "Using your hands to create someone, an individual who was a woman of faith—one kind of feeds the other. I almost feel her presence at times when I’m working."

The plans to create the sculpture had been in the works since 2004. It took Clark over a year to carve the piece, finalizing it in early 2006. After approval from the National Shrine, a fiberglass molding was produced and the sculpture was sent to Fairplay's studio.

The limestone came from Victor Oolitic Stone Company in Oolitic, Indiana, and was delayed in being delivered to Fairplay's studio.

== Acquisition ==
The sculpture, a gift of the Sisters of Providence of Saint Mary-of-the-Woods, was installed in Mary's Garden at the National Shrine, on the grounds of the Basilica of the National Shrine of the Immaculate Conception in Washington, D.C., and dedicated on May 10, 2008. More than 450 people attended the ceremony which included Clark. After a liturgy was held at the Crypt Church at the Shrine, Archbishop Pietro Sambi blessed the sculpture. A reception was held at the Pope John Paul II Cultural Center.

The sculpture was described as a "wonderful addition" to the garden by Walter R. Rossi.
