= Henri Marchand (sculptor) =

French-American sculptor

- Born: Jules Henri Marchand
- Education: studied under Auguste Rodin
- Known for: diorama

Henri Marchand (1877–1950) was a French-American sculptor known for his detailed museum dioramas.

== Early life ==
Born in France, Marchand studied under Auguste Rodin. In 1903, he and his wife Clothilde, also an artist, emigrated to the United States. Marchand began working as a diorama artist at the New York State Museum. His work on the museum's Iroquois dioramas, dedicated in 1918, earned him recognition.

In 1925, Marchand and his family moved to Buffalo, New York, where he and his sons Paul and George were to construct dioramas for the Buffalo Museum of Science. Though much of the work the Marchands created there is no longer on display, some can still be seen, particularly in the museum's Hall of Wildflowers.

== Scandal ==
Tragedy fell upon the family in 1930, when Marchand's wife Clothilde was murdered by a Seneca woman named Nancy Bowen, who had been influenced by a younger woman in her tribe who was intimately involved with Marchand. This younger woman, Lila Jimerson, was one of Marchand's models for the exhibits he was working on at the time.

During the very public trial, it was revealed that Marchand had had numerous affairs, many with native women. Marchand testified that this behavior was a "professional necessity" since his diorama work required him to sculpt bare-chested women. He also said during the trial that his wife Clothilde knew about and accepted his lifestyle, statements viewed as arrogant by numerous members of the court and the press.

== Legacy ==
Though Marchand left the Buffalo Science Museum position following his wife's death, he continued to construct dioramas through the Marchand Diorama Corporation and had several workers under him. For instance, in the early 1930s, he donated a diorama to the Sisters of Providence of Saint Mary-of-the-Woods that depicted the beginnings of their congregation; he sent one of his artists, Gregory Kamka, to finish eleven other dioramas for them.

Marchand's sons Paul and George Marchand became well known in the field of museum dioramas themselves. Among themselves, the family created works for places including Chicago's Field Museum of Natural History, the Smithsonian Institution and the American Museum of Natural History.
