= Kathleen Desautels =

Sister Kathleen Desautels, SP
- Employer: 8th Day Center for Justice

Sister Kathleen Desautels, S.P., is a community organizer and social justice activist. A Roman Catholic nun, she is a member of the Sisters of Providence of Saint Mary-of-the-Woods.

== Biography ==
Desautels has worked for 8th Day Center for Justice in Chicago, Illinois for over 25 years, focusing on issues of human rights, women in the church, institutional power, and peace. Previously she ministered as an elementary school teacher, a prison chaplain and a pastoral associate.

Desautels attended Saint Mary-of-the-Woods College and went on to receive a Masters in religious studies from La Salle University. She joined the Sisters of Providence in 1960 and became a fully professed sister in 1968.

For her work as a prominent activist, Desautels has been profiled by Rolling Stone and the Chicago Tribune, among others. She was also featured in the 2012 documentary Band of Sisters, directed and produced by Mary Fishman.

Desautels has been arrested numerous times for acts of non-violent civil disobedience. In the early 1990s she was involved with labor movement protests during the A. E. Staley Lockout and was arrested twice. In November 2001 Desautels, dressed in a funeral shroud and carrying a symbolic foam coffin, trespassed onto federal property at Fort Benning outside Columbus, Georgia as part of a protest against the US Army School of the Americas. As a result, Desautels served a six-month prison sentence as a "prisoner of conscience".
