= Sisters of Providence Convent Cemetery =

Catholic cemetery in Indiana, United States

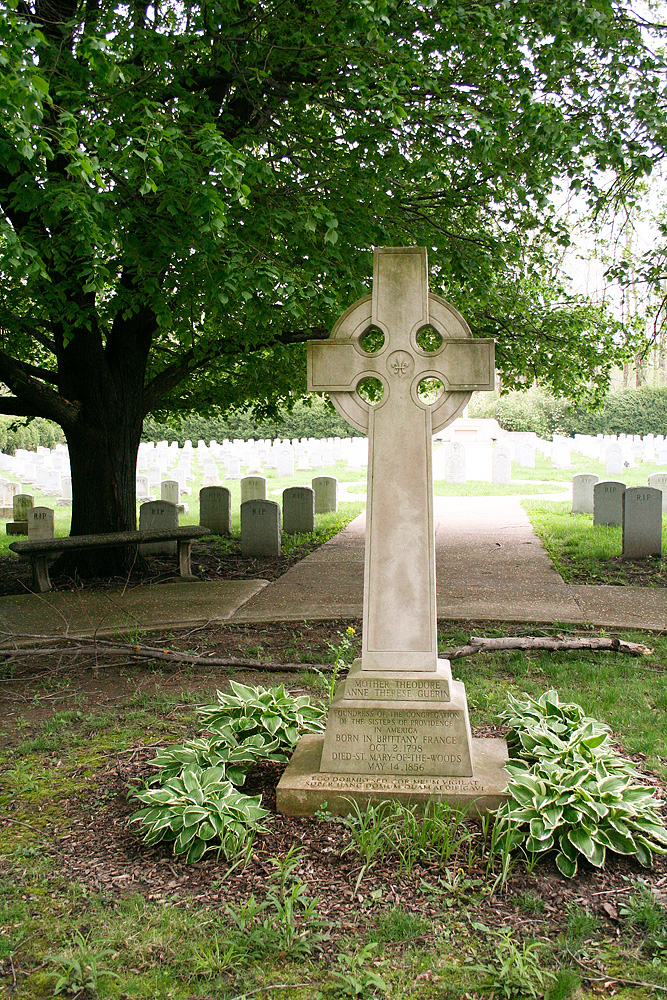
- The grave of Saint Mother Theodore Guerin in the Sisters of Providence convent cemetery
- Interactive map of Sisters of Providence Convent Cemetery

Details
- Established: 1861
- Location: Saint Mary-of-the-Woods, Indiana, US
- Country: United States
- Coordinates: 39.5095°N 87.4566°W
- Type: Private
- Owned by: Sisters of Providence of Saint Mary-of-the-Woods
- Size: 30 acres (120,000 m^{2})
- No. of graves: over 2100
- Website: www.sistersofprovidence.org
- Find a Grave: Sisters of Providence Convent Cemetery

Convent Cemetery in Saint Mary-of-the-Woods, Indiana, is the cemetery for the Sisters of Providence of Saint Mary-of-the-Woods, a congregation of Catholic women religious founded in 1840 by Théodore Guérin.

The original location for the sisters' cemetery was a small hill near Saint Anne Shell Chapel on the motherhouse grounds in Saint Mary-of-the-Woods. The earliest deaths in the community were buried here, including Saint Mother Theodore. It soon became clear that more land would be necessary to accommodate the growing congregation.

On October 13, 1857, Mother Mary Cecilia Bailly, general superior of the Congregation, purchased 30.39 acres (123,000 m^{2}) just east of the Shell Chapel, but nothing was done to prepare the ground until 1860. That year, a stump puller was hired, cemetery limits were set, and work on the cemetery began.

The first grave in the new cemetery was filled on April 10, 1861, with the burial of Sister Seraphine Jennings. Later, the graves from the earlier cemetery were exhumed and the bodies were moved to the new cemetery, including that of Saint Mother Theodore. A portion of Saint Mother Theodore's remains still rest in the cemetery, along with several thousand Sisters of Providence and several priests who have served the community.

Several tombstones in the cemetery are government-issue military headstones, honoring several Sisters of Providence who served in military hospitals during the Civil War. These stones were installed with a Requiem Mass and ceremony on July 31, 1923.
