= Sisters of Providence of Saint Mary-of-the-Woods =

Religious congregation of Catholic women in Indiana (1840–)

Sisters of Providence of Saint Mary-of-the-Woods, Indiana
- Abbreviation: S.P.
- Formation: October 22, 1840; 186 years ago
- Type: religious institute
- Headquarters: Saint Mary-of-the-Woods, Indiana
- Location: United States, Asia
- General Superior: Sister Dawn Tomaszewski
- Website: sistersofprovidence.org
- Remarks: Founded by Saint Mother Theodore Guerin

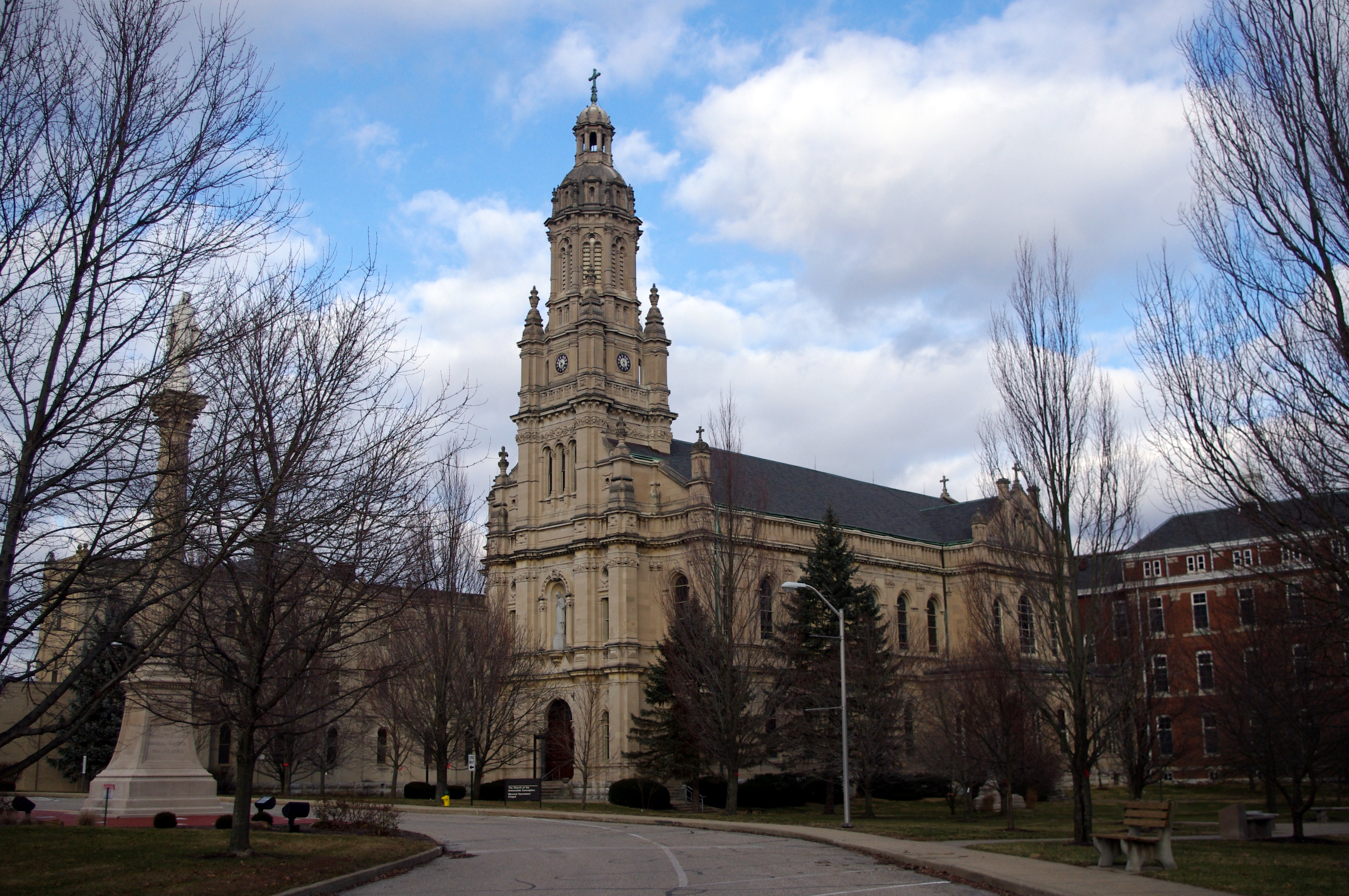
Church of the Immaculate Conception (Saint Mary-of-the-Woods, Indiana)

The Sisters of Providence of Saint Mary-of-the-Woods is a religious congregation of Catholic women founded by Théodore Guérin in Saint Mary-of-the-Woods, Indiana, in 1840. Guérin and her five companion sisters departed from the Sisters of Providence of Ruillé-sur-Loir, France, at the invitation of the Bishop of Vincennes to found the Sisters of Providence in the United States. In 1843, the Indiana congregation became independent of the religious institute in Ruillé, and the rules of the congregation were approved by the Holy See in 1887.

More than 5,200 women have entered the Sisters of Providence since 1840. As of 2014, there were nearly 350 sisters in the institute, roughly 300 of whom live and minister from the motherhouse grounds in Saint Mary-of-the-Woods, Indiana. Other sisters minister in 17 U.S. states, the District of Columbia, and Asia. Currently, foreign missions are in Asia. Former foreign missions were in Peru and Antigua.

Sisters of Providence are designated by the initials "SP" following their name in print. The congregation is a member of the Women of Providence in Collaboration.

Guérin was canonized on October 15, 2006. The miraculous healing in 1908 of Mary Theodosia Mug, who was also her biographer, was accepted by the Holy See for her sainthood in 2006. Her remains are located in her official shrine near the Church of the Immaculate Conception at Saint Mary-of-the-Woods, Indiana, as well as a portion buried in the nearby Sisters of Providence Convent Cemetery.

== History ==
In 1840 at the invitation of Bishop Simon Bruté of the Diocese of Vincennes, the Sisters of Providence of Ruillé-sur-Loir, France, sent Sister St. Theodore Guerin to open a school and minister to people in the Diocese of Vincennes. She was accompanied by five other sisters: Sister St. Vincent Ferrer (Victoire) Gagé, Sister Basilide (Josephine) Sénéschal, Sister Olympiade (Therese) Boyer, Sister Mary Xavier (Francis Louise) Lerée, and Sister Mary Liguori (Louise Frances) Tiercin.

Marker on location of first Sisters of Providence motherhouse

After a rough journey across the Atlantic Ocean and the eastern United States, the sisters arrived in Saint Mary-of-the-Woods, Indiana, on October 22, 1840. They stayed with a local family, Joseph and Sarah Thralls. (This location is now honored with a historical marker from the Indiana Historical Bureau.)

The Sisters of Providence of Saint Mary-of-the Woods were established as a separate community than the founding congregation in Ruillé-sur-Loir. The rules and constitutions received final approval from the Holy See in 1887.

=== Educational ministry ===
Educators from the beginning, the sisters began building a school for girls called "The Academy" in 1840. The first student at the academy arrived for enrollment July 4, 1841. The Academy is now known as Saint Mary-of-the-Woods College and is the oldest Roman Catholic college for women in the United States. As early as 1846, a charter was granted by the State empowering the institution to confer academic honors and collegiate degrees.

The sisters soon found themselves in charge of or staffing several local schools, including St. Joseph's Parochial Catholic School, St. Benedict's German Catholic School, and St. Patrick's Day School, all in nearby Terre Haute. As their reputation grew, the Sisters of Providence would eventually staff schools across Indiana. They would also extend their ministry into Illinois, Massachusetts, California, Florida, Texas, Oklahoma, other states, and the District of Columbia. They have also staffed schools internationally in China, Taiwan, and at Colegio San José in Arequipa, Peru.

=== Civil War ===
In May 1861 the Sisters of Providence were asked to take over the administration of City Hospital in Indianapolis, when measles broke out in the nearby state encampment. The United States Government turned it into a military hospital for the duration of the war. In June 1864, seventy-five Hoosiers from Sherman's army were transferred from hospitals in Louisville and Jeffersonville. The hospital also cared for wounded Confederate soldiers. Under the direction of Mary Cecilia Bailly, the sisters took charge of washing, cooking, and cleaning; several Sisters served as nurses. In a "Report of the Surgeons of the Military Hospital" to the Inspector General, Doctors John M Kitchen and P.H. Jameson wrote, "In conclusion we feel that ... whatever success may have attended the management of the Hospital is due in a great degree to the noble and self-sacrificing efforts of those meek and worthy women – the sisters of Providence."

A Confederate prison was also located in Indianapolis, which held at one time 7,000 prisoners. According to Colonel Oran Perry of the 69th Regiment of Indiana, "It is probable that all the Sisters in the Service in the city here were, at times, on duty in this prison. ... The Sisters were seen everywhere, on the boats, in the barracks, in the streets, always giving the most tender care to the soldiers."

After the Battle of Fort Donelson, the Bishop of Vincennes offered the use of the seminary for the sick and wounded and the assistance of the sisters to care for them. Soldiers of the 19th Illinois Regiment were cared for at this emergency facility. The Sisters also staffed a contagion ward set up at the college at Vincennes.

At the end of the war the hospital was returned to the city and the Sisters opened St John's Infirmary for those soldiers with no place to go, but not yet strong enough to travel.

=== Mission in Asia ===
The Sisters of Providence of Saint Mary-of-the-Woods were the first congregation of American women religious to establish a mission in China.

==== Ministry in Kaifeng ====
In the summer of 1919, Bishop Joseph Tacconi of Kaifeng, China, met with Sisters of Providence general superior Mother Mary Cleophas Foley to request sisters for a school for young women in Kaifeng. Sister Marie Gratia Luking led this group of sisters to Kaifeng to open an elementary school and a junior middle school for girls. Luking and her companions arrived in Kaifeng on November 24, 1920. Soon after arriving, the sisters opened a medical dispensary and the Hua Mei School for Girls. The sisters ministered here until 1927 when the Communist army of Mao Zedong reached Kaifeng. The sisters were forced to leave, taking refuge with the Maryknoll Sisters in Korea.

In 1929 they returned to Kaifeng and opened an orphanage as well as a novitiate for women wanting to enter religious life. This native congregation, the Providence Sister-Catechists, received papal approval in 1932. Ching I Middle School was opened September 12, 1932.

==== World War II ====
Japan began threatening China by 1935, and air raids, bombings, and attacks by soldiers became commonplace. Kaifeng was bombed March 25, 1938. Soon the school and novitiate became a place of refuge for people seeking safe haven. Though Kaifeng fell to the Japanese June 6, 1938, and life became more difficult for the sisters, they remained in their compound.

On December 8, 1941, the sisters' compound in Kaifeng was attacked by Japanese soldiers. The sisters from the United States were forced to relocate to a Baptist mission compound and then a Benedictine Sisters' compound in Kaifeng. On March 22, 1943, the Sisters of Providence and all other U.S. missionaries were interned at the Weihsien Compound, a concentration camp in Shandong. Five months later U.S. internees were again relocated, this time to Peking where they were placed under house arrest with the Spanish Daughters of Jesus.

In September 1945 after the war had ended, the sisters returned to Kaifeng and repaired their compound, I Ching School, and the novitiate. However, China was soon politically plagued by internal strife between the Communists and the Nationalists. As the Communist armies advanced to Kaifeng, the United States Consulate General advised U.S. citizens to leave. The sisters spent some time with the Religious of the Sacred Heart in Shanghai.

==== Taiwan ====
As China fell under Communist rule, 23 Sisters of Providence and Providence Sister-Catechists moved to Taiwan, then known as Formosa, and settled in Taichung. Luking and the other sisters began building a new college. The school, now known as Providence University, opened in 1949 and moved to Shalu, Taichung, in 1987.

Currently, Sisters of Providence work in multiple ministries in Taiwan. In addition to Providence University, sisters staff multiple facilities for care of children and adults with mental and/or physical disabilities including St. Theresa Opportunity Center in Yucheng, Reed School in Hsinchu, St. Camillus de Lellis Center for the Mentally Challenged in Penghu, and Miracle Place in Taishan.

== Spirituality ==
According to their mission statement, Sisters of Providence are "dedicated to the mission of being God's Providence in the world by committing ourselves to works of love, mercy and justice in service among God's people."

Individual sisters are free to worship in their own ways and places of ministry. On the motherhouse grounds of Saint Mary-of-the-Woods, the congregation has daily mass available in the Church of the Immaculate Conception. The grounds are also home to numerous shrines and sacred places, including the Blessed Sacrament Chapel, the Saint Anne Shell Chapel, the Grotto of Our Lady of Lourdes, the National Shrine of Our Lady of Providence, and a walking labyrinth. An outdoor set of the Stations of the Cross leads into the Sisters of Providence Convent Cemetery.

== Current ministries ==
Sisters of Providence work in the areas of education, health care, peace and justice, social services, and spiritual development. In addition to the individual ministries of its sisters, the congregation funds multiple ministry organizations.

=== Providence Spirituality & Conference Center ===
Providence Spirituality & Conference Center is the welcoming center for pilgrims and visitors to the Sisters of Providence at Saint Mary-of-the-Woods. It offers retreats and other events. The facility serves as the entrance to the Shrine of Saint Mother Theodore Guerin. Also preserved at the center is a set of twelve historical dioramas, begun by Henri Marchand and completed by Gregory Kamka.

There is also a gift shop, dining services in O'Shaughnessy Dining Hall, and the National Shrine of Our Lady of Providence.

=== White Violet Center for Eco-Justice ===
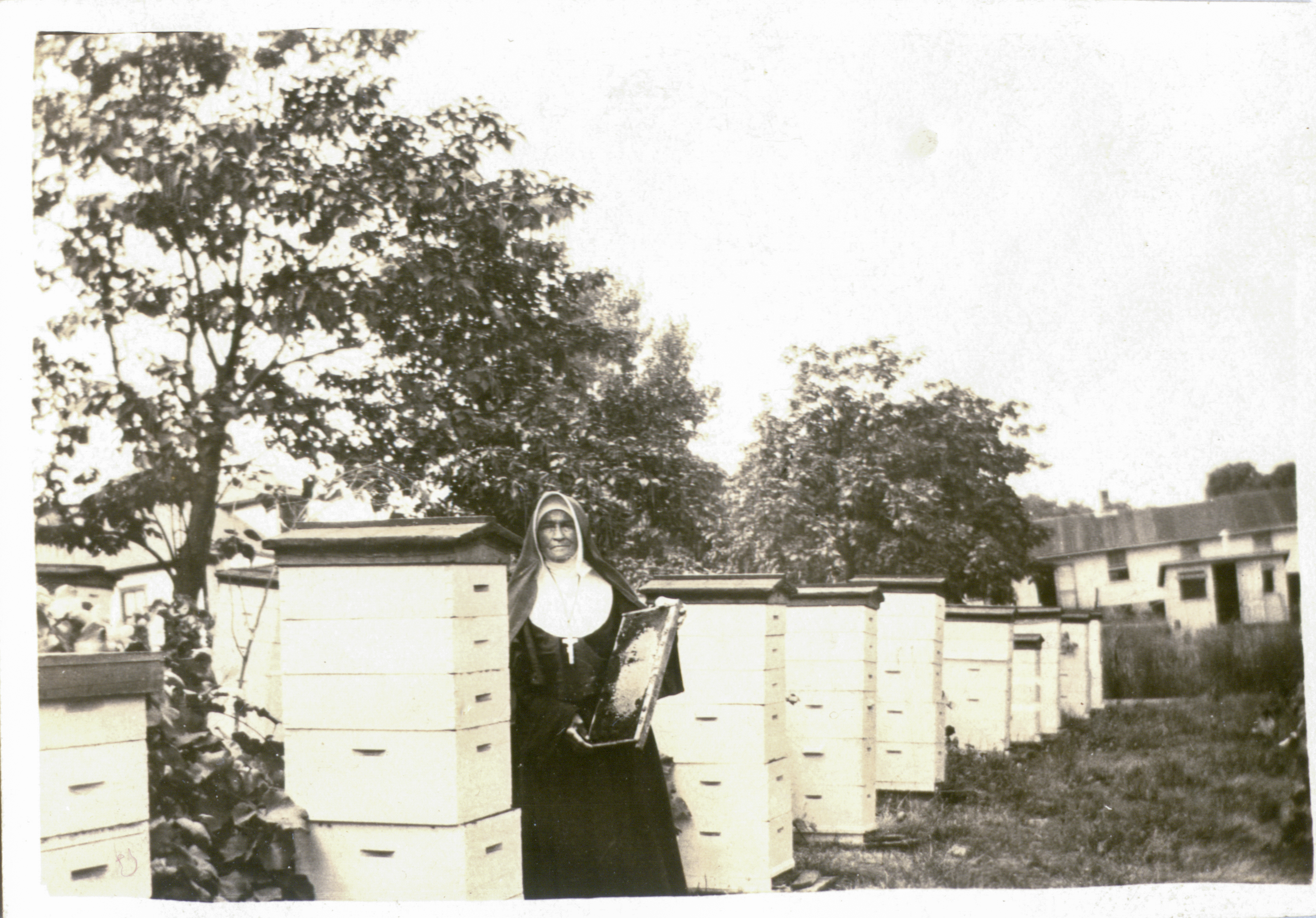
Sr. Morris, keeper of bees, c. 1900

White Violet Center for Eco-Justice focuses on organic agriculture, eco-justice education, spiritual ecology and social advocacy. Founded in 1995, the center maintains a herd of alpacas, 343 acres (1.39 km^{2}) of state-certified organic farmland, bees, a berry patch, a farmers' market, classified forest, and orchards. White Violet Center is considered an "engaged project" by the Yale Forum on Religion and Ecology.

=== Guerin Outreach Ministries ===
Guerin Outreach Ministries is made up of two ministries: Providence Family Services in West Humboldt Park, Chicago, and Providence in the Desert in southern California. These ministries provide adult literacy/GED instruction, tutoring for school-age children, English as a Second Language classes, citizenship classes, music classes, computer literacy classes, and bilingual counseling.

== Activism in society ==
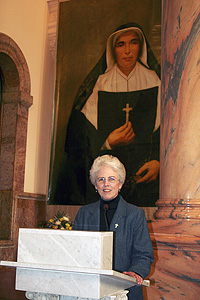
Ann Margaret O'Hara, a past General Superior of the Sisters of Providence of Saint Mary-of-the-Woods. Since the 1970s, the Sisters have abandoned their religious habit for the pant suit.

In the aftermath of the Second Vatican Council, the congregation has elected to focus on what it calls social justice issues: women in church/society, eco-justice, racism, nonviolent strategies for peace and disarmament, immigrant rights, and persons living in poverty.

Several ministries of the Sisters of Providence address these issues, including White Violet Center for Eco-Justice, Guerin Outreach Ministries, Providence Self Sufficiency Ministries.

The Sisters of Providence administer grants to not-for-profit systemic change groups with limited access to other funding through their Poverty and Justice Fund. They are also a founding congregation and sponsoring member of 8th Day Center for Justice, based out of Chicago.

=== Death penalty and prison reform ===
Numerous Sisters of Providence participate in prison ministry, visiting and writing to inmates. The General Council of the Sisters of Providence adopted a public stance against the death penalty in 1995 in collaboration with the Leadership Conference of Women Religious. Sisters of Providence plan prayer vigils, write letters to government leaders and provide media relations support for this cause.

The only federal execution chamber in the United States is located at the Federal Correctional Complex just south of Terre Haute, Indiana, only five miles away from the motherhouse of the Sisters of Providence in Saint Mary-of-the-Woods, Indiana.

=== Nonviolence ===
The Sisters of Providence Anti-Racism Team works to dismantle systemic racism within the Sisters of Providence, their sponsored institutions, places of ministry, and the larger society. The Sisters of Providence Litany of Non-violence reads, in part, "Deliver us from the silence that gives consent to abuse, war and evil. Grant us the desire, and the courage, to risk speaking and acting for the common good."

=== Prisoners of Conscience ===
Since 1990, numerous Sisters of Providence have been involved with School of the Americas Watch in protest of the training of mainly Latin American military officers by the United States Department of Defense, at the School of the Americas in Fort Benning, Georgia.

Several Sisters of Providence have chosen to take direct action in protest, facing legal repercussions for crossing onto federal property at Fort Benning. For action in November 2001, Sister Kathleen Desautels was convicted of federal trespassing and served a six-month sentence at the Federal Prison Camp in Greenville, Illinois. Other sisters have been arrested and sentenced to house arrest, community service, and probation.

=== Green projects ===
The Sisters of Providence maintain a significant recycling program and use a sustainable irrigation system for their organic gardens and orchards.

== Sisters of Providence ==
=== General superiors ===
- Saint Mother Theodore Guerin, congregation foundress and Roman Catholic saint; general superior 1840–1856

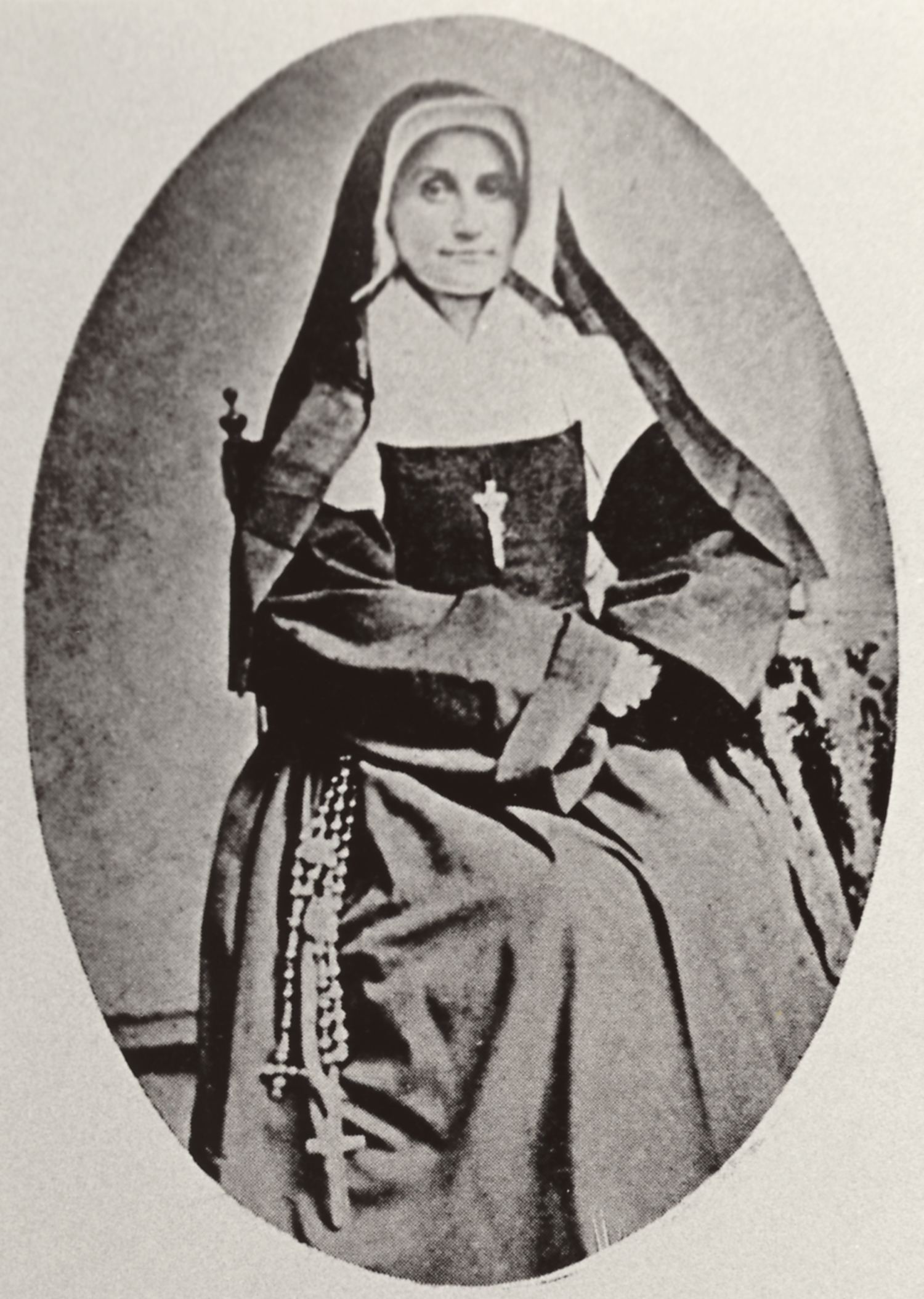
Mother Mary Cecilia Bailly 1868-1874

- Mother Mary Cecilia Bailly, 1856–1868
- Mother Anastasie Brown, 1868–1874
- Sister Anne Doherty, 1981–1986
- Mother Mary Cleophas Foley, 1890–1926, inaugurated Saint Mary-of-the-Woods College and mission in China
- Mother Marie Helene Franey, 1948–1953
- Mother Mary Ephrem Glenn, 1874–1883
- Mother Euphrasie Hinkle, 1883–1889
- Mother Rose Angela Horan, 1960–1966
- Mother Mary Bernard Laughlin, 1938–1948
- Sister Nancy Nolan, 1986–1996
- Sister Ann Margaret O'Hara, 2001–2006
- Mother Gertrude Clare Owens, 1954–1960
- Mother Mary Pius Regnier, 1966–1976
- Sister Diane Ris, 1996–2001
- Sister Loretta Schafer, 1976–1981
- Mother Mary Raphael Slattery, 1926–1938
- Sister Denise Wilkinson, 2006–2016
- Sister Dawn Tomaszewski, 2016–

=== Other sisters ===
- Sister Judith Birgen, professor and Fulbright lecturer (Uganda, 2008)
- Sister Cecilia Clare Bocard, musician and composer for organ and piano
- Sister Irma Le Fer de la Motte (1816–1856), French-born sister, novice mistress
- Sister Barbara Doherty, educator and theologian, president of Saint Mary-of-the-Woods College 1984–1998
- Sister Jeanne Knoerle, author and educator, president of Saint Mary-of-the-Woods College 1968–1983
- Sister Ann Joseph Morris, keeper of the bees, 1871–1930
- Mary Theodosia Mug, 1860–1943
- Sister Esther Newport, painter, art educator and founder of the Catholic Art Association
- Sister Edith Pfau, painter, sculptor and art educator
- Sister Alexa Suelzer, theologian, author and educator known for Old Testament criticism

== See also ==
- St. Elizabeth Church and School
