= Saint Mary-of-the-Woods College =

Catholic college in Indiana, US

- Motto: Virtus cum Scientia (Virtue and Knowledge United)
- Type: Private liberal arts college
- Established: 1840; 186 years ago
- Religious affiliation: Catholic Church (Sisters of Providence of Saint Mary-of-the-Woods)
- President: Brennan Randolph
- Students: 1,159 (fall 2024)
- Undergraduates: 858 (fall 2024)
- Postgraduates: 301 (fall 2024)
- Location: Saint Mary-of-the-Woods, Indiana, U.S. 39.5087°N 87.4665°W
- Campus: Rural, 67 acres (27 ha)
- Colors: Pomeroy Blue & White
- Nickname: Pomeroys
- Sporting affiliations: NAIA – River States; IHSA
- Mascot: Onyx
- Website: smwc.edu
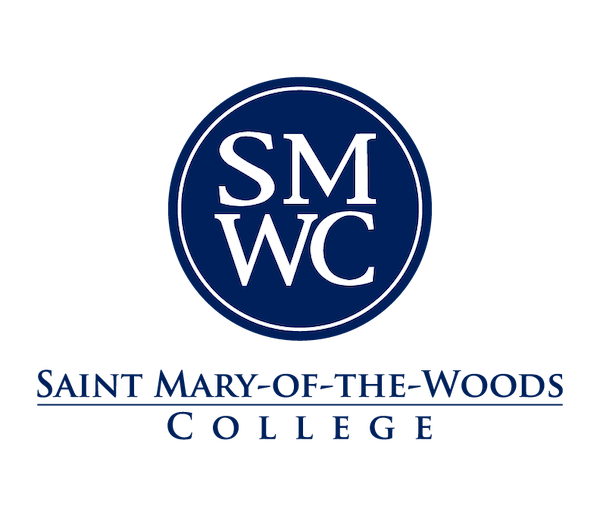

Saint Mary-of-the-Woods College (SMWC) is a private Catholic liberal arts college in Saint Mary-of-the-Woods, Indiana, United States. Originally a college exclusively for women, it is now coeducational. It is the oldest Catholic college in Indiana and is known for the Mari Hulman George School of Equine Studies.

== History ==
Saint Mary-of-the-Woods College was founded as an academy for young women by Saint Mother Theodore Guerin, who reached the site on October 22, 1840, after three months of travel. She led five Sisters of Providence, who had traveled from their convent in Ruillé-sur-Loir, France.

Mother Theodore had not been the first to step forward when the Bishop of Vincennes asked the Sisters of Providence to establish an academy for young women in Indiana. Although she had been decorated by the French Board of Education as a highly gifted and efficient teacher, Mother Theodore felt unworthy of the task of founding an institution of learning. Her superiors convinced her to accept the assignment. Saint Mother Theodore Guerin was canonized on October 15, 2006, by Pope Benedict XVI, and is Indiana's first saint.

In 1846, Saint Mary-of-the-Woods College was granted the first charter for the higher education of women in the state of Indiana. SMWC conferred its first Bachelor of Arts degree in 1899. It was the first women's college to offer journalism courses and the first to offer degree work in secondary education, home economics, and secretarial science. As the careers open to women expanded, the college expanded into areas such as business, computer information systems, equine studies, psychology and nursing. SMWC now offers associate and bachelor's degrees in over 30 majors on campus and online. In 2015, Saint Mary-of-the-Woods College announced that the board of trustees voted unanimously to become fully coeducational at its May 1, 2015 meeting.

Saint Mary-of-the-Woods College is recognized as a pioneer in the area of distance education. In 1973, the college introduced one of the first independent study programs in the nation, the Women's External Degree (WED) program. This program served adult women who needed flexible schedules to earn a degree while balancing important family and job responsibilities. In 2005, the college expanded access to its undergraduate distance and adult programs to men, while maintaining its longstanding mission for the advancement of women's education. Today, through the renamed Woods Online program, women and men can earn a college degree in a wide variety of majors. In August 2012, the Indianapolis Business Journal recognized SMWC as having one of the largest online degree programs in the state. More than 800 are currently enrolled in the program from 33 states and all across the globe, including England, Greece, Hong Kong and Jamaica. In 2015, all programs, including the campus-based resident undergraduate degree program, were opened to both men and women.

Saint Mary-of-the-Woods College also offers three master's degree programs, open to both women and men, in the hybrid format. In 2000, the college created the Master of Arts in Art Therapy (MAAT) program, designed for persons who use or plan to use art in therapy or art as therapy, and the Master of Arts in Music Therapy (MAMT) program, which welcomes qualified music therapists seeking an advanced understanding of the therapeutic uses of music. In 2007, the college introduced the Master of Leadership Development (MLD) program. This program explores culture and creativity, leadership identity, ethical decision-making and critical analysis of research. All three master's degree programs use distance learning and intensive campus-based residencies.

=== Motto ===
"Virtus cum Scientia," translated as "Virtue with Knowledge United," appears on the SMWC seal and/or coat of arms.

=== Coat of arms ===
The college's coat of arms is a shield divided vertically in halves. The left field is blue, showing in the center a poplar tree on a hill or terrace in natural colors, with the first letter of the name of Mary; these latter devices are in gold. The right field is gold and shows three eaglets with open wings in blue, and beak and talons in red. The right half of the shield shows the arms of Madame du Roscoat, the foundress of the Sisters of Providence at Ruille-sur-Loir, France. The three eaglets are emblematic of the Holy Trinity, the motto of the du Roscoat family being "Trino Soli sit honor et gloria" ("To the Triune God alone honor and glory").

The left field is charged with devices symbolic or significant of some fact connected with the history of Saint Mary-of-the-Woods. The rayed star, charged with the letter "M" in blue, is an emblem of Mary Mother of God, the Stella Matutina, under whose protection Saint Mary-of-the-Woods, represented by a tree, places all its hopes for growth and life. The Latin crosses are emblems of Redemption and Catholicity. The crest is the count's coronet of the du Roscoat family and the motto "Virtus cum Scientia," is the one chosen by Mother Theodore Guerin, foundress of the Sisters of Providence in America.

== Academics ==
The curriculum of Saint Mary-of-the-Woods College is based on a traditional liberal arts education. All campus students are required to complete an extensive curriculum of general studies in addition to their major(s) and/or minor(s).

SMWC is a member of the College Consortium of Western Indiana. This membership allows students who are full-time at their home institution to take one class at other member institutions Rose–Hulman Institute of Technology and Indiana State University (both in nearby Terre Haute, Indiana) without additional tuition.

== Athletics ==
The Saint Mary-of-the-Woods (SMWC) athletic teams are called the Pomeroys, and the college is a member of the National Association of Intercollegiate Athletics (NAIA). Since the 2021–22 academic year, its teams compete primarily in the River States Conference (RSC). The school is also a member of the United States Collegiate Athletic Association (USCAA) and the Intercollegiate Horse Show Association (IHSA). SMWC athletes make up nearly 30 percent of all campus students.

SMWC competes in 16 intercollegiate varsity teams: Men's sports include basketball, cross country, equestrian, golf, soccer, sprint football, track & field and volleyball; while women's sports include basketball, cross country, equestrian, golf, soccer, softball, track & field and volleyball; as well as hunt seat. SMWC added sprint football, a weight-restricted form of American football that is not governed by the NAIA, the USCAA, or the National Collegiate Athletic Association (NCAA), in 2022. It is one of six charter members of the Midwest Sprint Football League.

=== Crosstown Classic ===
The Crosstown Classic is a hometown rivalry winter basketball game between SMWC and Rose-Hulman Institute of Technology. This annual competition has resulted in a 13–7 record favoring the Pomeroys. Prior to 2016, the game was known as the "Clabber Girl Classic", named for the famed Clabber Girl trophy presented by the Clabber Girl of Hulman and Company. The college announced a partnership with local automotive retailer Dorsett Automotive, changing the name to the "Dorsett Automotive Crosstown Classic".

=== USCAA National Championships ===
The SMWC softball team boasts 12 National Championships including four consecutive USCAA National Softball Championships (2002–2005). The SMWC Equestrian Team competes throughout the year in both Western and English, traveling to about 20 shows per season. SMWC has been the site for regional horse shows, managed by the SMWC equestrian team members. In 2007, the SMWC Western Team was named IHSA Reserve National Champions.

In 2009, the Pomeroy soccer team experienced a "Cinderella" season, in which they entered the USCAA National Championship Tournament as the eighth seed (the lowest seed) and advanced all the way to the national championship before being defeated by Marygrove College. Just days before the soccer team brought home the silver cup from Burlington, Vermont, the first-year cross-country squad won the USCAA National Championship in New Hampshire. Also in fall 2010, the cross-country team won a second USCAA National Championship.

National champions

Softball (12) - 1997¹, 2000¹, 2002, 2003, 2004, 2005, 2007, 2008, 2015, 2016, 2017, 2019

Women's Cross Country (3) - 2009, 2010, 2019

Men's Golf (2) - 2018, 2019

National runners-up

Softball (7) - 1997¹, 2006, 2009, 2010, 2011, 2013, 2017

Women's Soccer (1) - 2009

Women's Cross Country (1) - 2012

Men's Golf (1) - 2017

Women's Basketball (1) - 2000

Volleyball (4) - 2015, 2016, 2017, 2018

¹NSCAA

=== NAIA ===
On October 7, 2020, SMWC announced that they had been accepted as members of the National Association of Intercollegiate Athletics (NAIA) and would become provisional members of the River States Conference (RSC) starting July 1, 2021. The college will be eligible for postseason competition during the 2020–2021 academic year and is scheduled to become full members of the NAIA on July 1, 2022.

=== Club and intramural sports ===
The department currently offers seven non-scholarship club sport options; Competitive Cheer, Cycling, Dance, eSports, Powerlifting, Rowing, and Tennis. Each sport is guided by a head coach or instructor and some clubs may require try-outs for participation while others may have open membership.

Intramurals offer both competitive and non-competitive options through both the fall and spring semesters. Students are able to participate in "one-off" events on and off-campus and "season-long" team events including laser tag, mini-golf, cornhole, pickleball, basketball, volleyball, kickball, home run derby, capture the flag, video game tournaments, and bowling.

== Historic architecture ==
In addition to other structures, the campus includes six historic buildings owned by the college that date from 1913 to 1969: Guerin Hall (1913), Conservatory of Music (1913), Le Fer Hall (1924), Owens Hall (1960), Rooney Library (1964), and Hulman Hall (1969). The campus's 67 acres (27 hectares) are also home to the motherhouse of the Sisters of Providence of Saint-Mary-of-the Woods, whose buildings date from the 19th and 20th Centuries.

The Indianapolis architectural firm of D. A. Bohlen, Architect, and its successors, D. A. Bohlen and Son; Bohlen and Burns; and Bohlen, Meyer, Gibson and Associates, completed "more than sixty projects" for the Sisters of Providence, including all six of the historic buildings. More than twenty of the firm's projects, including Foley Hall (1860, 1897) at Saint Mary-of-the-Woods, are listed on the National Register of Historic Places. Foley Hall was demolished in 1989.

Campus architects retained its pastoral setting, while a "French influence reminiscent of Georges-Eugène Haussmann" is visible in the "straight walkways and open views". The historic buildings on campus were representative of popular architectural styles at the time of their construction. From 1894 until the 1970s, three generations of the Joseph Bisch family supervised maintenance of the campus.

=== Guerin Hall (1913) ===
Anne Therese Guérin Hall, designed by Oscar D. Bohlen in a Renaissance Revival style, is named in honor of the foundress of the Sisters of Providence of Saint Mary-of-the-Woods. Construction for the four-story brick building began in 1911; it was dedicated on October 12, 1913. Guerin Hall was the college's first residence for students. Its lower floor contained offices, classrooms, and a chapel, while its upper floors offered semi-private rooms, a new trend in student housing at that time. The ornate front entrance features heavily carved Corinthian capitals on pilasters, made of Indiana limestone. Guerin Hall surrounds an open courtyard and a veranda extends across the front of the building.

=== Conservatory of Music (1913) ===
Saint Cecilia Conservatory of Music was designed by Oscar D. Bohlen and constructed between 1911 and 1913, the same time as Guerin Hall. The Conservatory is located "on the site of the second Saint Mary-of-the-Woods village church and cemetery." The three-story, Italian Renaissance Revival-style Conservatory was constructed of light brick and Bedford limestone. It has Ionic details and Beaux-Arts influences. The Conservatory was dedicated along with Guerin Hall on October 12, 1913, and contained music studios, practice rooms, classrooms, and offices. Cecilian Auditorium, which "seats up to 720 people on the main floor and balcony", provides a theatrical space that includes a proscenium stage and theatrical lighting.

=== Le Fer Hall (1924) ===
Le Fer Hall, named in honor of Sisters Saint Francis Xavier and Mary Joseph Le Fer, two of Saint Mother Théodore Guérin's companions, serves as a residence hall for students. The Indianapolis architectural firm of D. A. Bohlen and Son designed the four-story, French Renaissance Revival-style building. Construction began in 1921. The yellow brick residence hall contains classical balustrades on its stone and decorative metal balconies; its twin towers and tile roof reflects the Spanish Revival architectural style. Le Fer Hall's main floor includes classrooms, offices, and a social hall/ballroom; rooms for students were on the upper floors. Residence hall rooms contain large windows and hardwood floors; more than 75 percent of them are suites with a connecting bathrooms.

=== Owens Hall (1960) ===
Robert Bohlen, the last of D. A. Bohlen's descendants, designed Owens Hall in 1960 as a novitiate building for the Sisters of Providence. Its modern design includes "spandrel panels of brushed aluminum" between the windows of its "vertical central bay".

=== Rooney Library (1964) ===
The Mary and Andy Rooney Library, a contemporary structure built at a cost of $1.28 million, was designed in 1961 by Indianapolis architects August C. Bohlen and Melvin B. G. Meyer of Bohlen and Burns. This modern interpretation of a Classical-style building includes an offset entrance with a vertical bay.

=== Hulman Hall (1969) ===
Mary Fendrich Hulman Hall, was designed by Melvin B. G. Meyers, president of Bohlen, Meyer, Gibson and Associates, in a Mid-century modern style. Its design is similar to Owens Hall and Rooney Library. The building's vertical design includes "spandrel panels and use of aluminum." The exterior's rough-cut stone in spandrel panels is classically inspired.

=== Les Bois (2021) ===
Les Bois (The Woods in French) was erected in the summer of 2021 following a large influx of on-campus students. It has a modern apartment design, with two bedrooms that fit two people each, a living room, and a kitchen.

== Accreditation ==
Saint Mary-of-the-Woods College is accredited through the Higher Learning Commission of the North Central Association of Colleges and Schools and approved for teacher training by the Indiana Department of Education and the National Council for Accreditation of Teacher Education (NCATE). Additionally, many individual programs of various departments are certified by their professional associations.

Programs of various departments are certified by their professional associations, including American Art Therapy Association, American Bar Association, American Music Therapy Association, Institute for the Certification of Computer Professionals (ICCP), National Association of Schools of Music, and Society for Human Resource Management.

== Notable alumni ==
- Marie Louise Andrews (1849–1891), story writer and journalist
- Amalia Küssner Coudert (1863–1932), painter and miniaturist
- Barbara A. Curran, attorney and member of the New Jersey General Assembly
- Sister Kathleen Desautels, community organizer and activist
- Sister Barbara Doherty, educator and theologian, president of Saint Mary-of-the-Woods College (1984–1988)
- Mary Fendrich Hulman (1905–1998), Hulman family matriarch
- Mari Hulman George, Chairman emeritus of the Indianapolis Motor Speedway
- Sister Jeanne Knoerle (1928–2013), author and educator, president of Saint Mary-of-the-Woods College (1968–1983)
- Marta Linares, First Lady of Panama (2009–2014)
- Sister Mary Theodosia Mug, author, poet, and composer who sometimes wrote as Helen Maery.
- Caroline Myss, mystic and medical intuitive
- Mary Alma Ryan, first graduate of the school that became the college, superior of the academy.
- Kathy Sinnott, Irish Member of the European Parliament (2004–2009) and disability rights campaigner
- Sister Alexa Suelzer (1918–2015), theologian, author, and educator known for Old Testament criticism
- Jean M. Wilkowski, author and ambassador
- Sarah Vaughn, comic book writer and artist (Alex + Ada, Sparkshooter, etc.)
- Kathryn A. Martin, Chancellor, University of Minnesota Duluth
- Rose Leke (1966–1969), Cameroonian malariologist
- Alice Moore McComas, author, editor, lecturer, and suffragist
- Peggy Lehner, formerly served as state senator for the 6th District of the Ohio Senate, and in the Ohio House of Representatives
