= Théodore Guérin =

French-American Catholic educator and saint

Saint Théodore Guérin SP
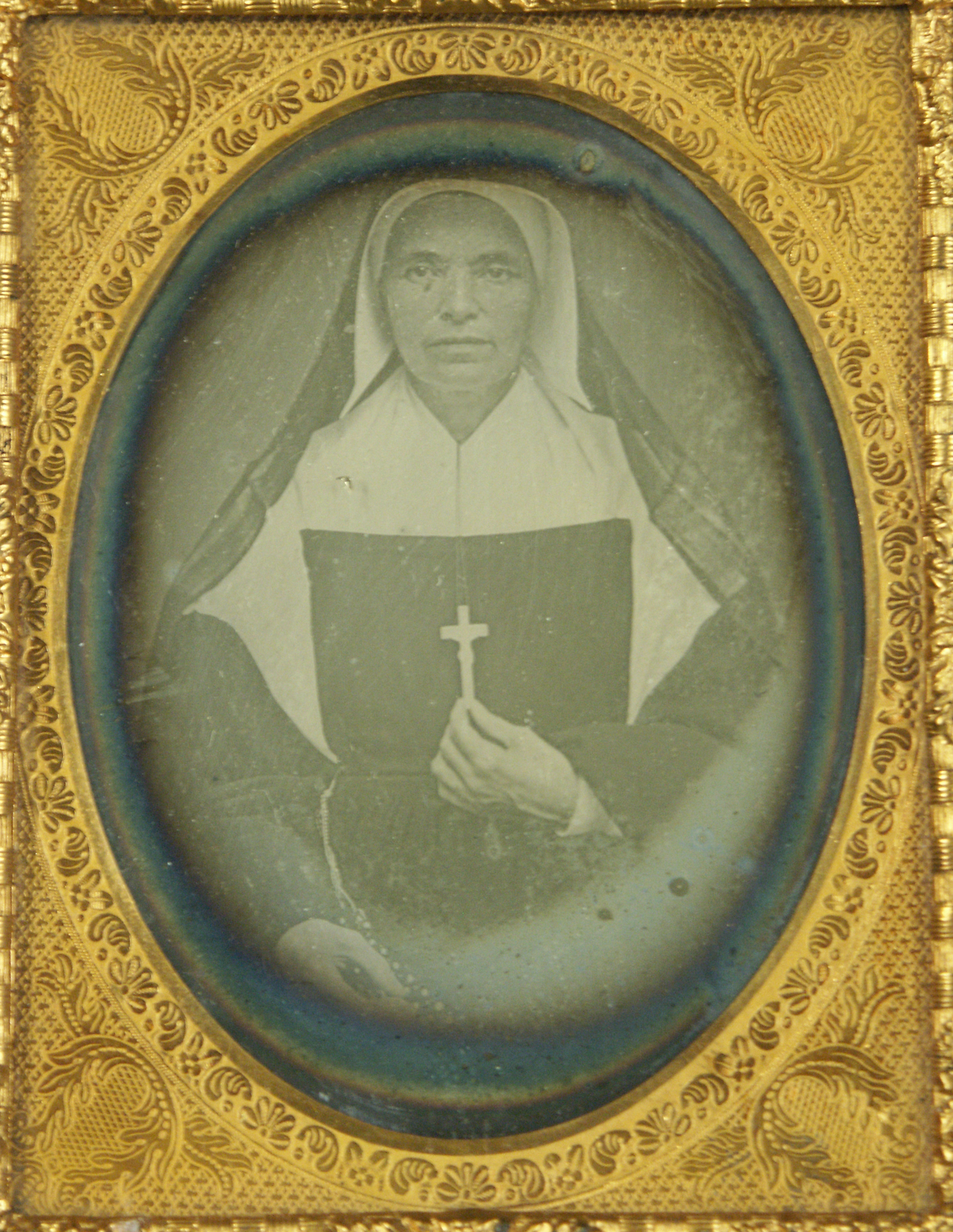
- 1855 portrait of Guérin

Religious, Foundress, Superior General of the Sisters of Providence of Saint Mary-of-the-Woods, Caretaker, Educator
- Born: Anne-Thérèse Guérin; October 2, 1798; Étables-sur-Mer, France
- Died: May 14, 1856 (aged 57); Saint Mary-of-the-Woods, Indiana, United States
- Venerated in: Catholic Church
- Beatified: October 25, 1998, by Pope John Paul II
- Canonized: October 15, 2006, by Pope Benedict XVI
- Major shrine: Shrine of Saint Mother Theodore Guérin and Sisters of Providence Convent Cemetery, Saint Mary-of-the-Woods, Indiana (where her remains are entombed)
- Feast: October 3
- Patronage: State of Indiana; Roman Catholic Diocese of Lafayette in Indiana; Indianapolis

Théodore Guérin SP (born Anne Thérèse Guérin; French pronunciation: [an teʁɛz ɡeʁɛ̃]; 2 October 1798 – 14 May 1856) was a French-American Catholic religious sister who founded the Sisters of Providence of Saint Mary-of-the-Woods, based in Saint Mary-of-the-Woods, Indiana.

Born and raised in France, Guérin immigrated to the United States in 1840, where she became known for her advancement of education, especially in Indiana and in eastern Illinois. She founded numerous schools, including Saint Mary-of-the-Woods College in Saint Mary-of-the-Woods, Indiana. Guérin is known for her care of the orphaned, the sick, and the poor of the Diocese of Vincennes.

Guérin was beatified by Pope John Paul II in 1998, and she was canonized by Pope Benedict XVI in 2006. Mother Guérin's feast day is 3 October, although some calendars list it in the Roman Martyrology as 14 May, the date of her death.

== Early life and education ==
Anne-Thérèse Guérin was born on 2 October 1798, in the village of Étables-sur-Mer in Brittany, France, to Laurent Guérin, an officer in the French Navy under Napoleon Bonaparte, and Isabelle (Lefèvre) Guérin. Anne-Thérèse was born near the end of the French Revolution, which led to the Reign of Terror and the establishment of the French First Republic. This period of significant change also caused a crisis within French Catholicism, when schools and churches were closed, and many Catholic priests chose exile over death from the guillotine.

Laurent and Isabelle Guérin had four children, two sons (Jean-Laurent and Laurent-Marie) and two daughters; however, only Anne-Thérèse and her younger sister, Marie-Jeanne, survived to adulthood. The Guérin sisters were mostly educated at home by their mother and later by a relative who lived with the family.

Anne-Thérèse knew from an early age that she would devote her life to serving God. At the age of ten, when she was allowed to take her First Communion two years earlier than the custom of the time, she confided to the priest in Etables that she wished to enter a religious community when she was older.

When Guérin was fifteen, tragedy struck the family. Bandits robbed and killed her father as he was traveling home to visit his family. The grief proved to be too much for Isabelle Guérin, who already had lost two children, and she fell into a deep depression. The teenaged Anne-Thérèse accepted the responsibility of caring for her mother and sister, as well as the family's home and garden. When her sister became old enough to take on household tasks, Anne-Therese took sewing jobs and work in a factory to help support the family. Around the age of twenty, Guérin asked for her mother's blessing to join a religious order, but Isabelle was still unable to cope with her loss and refused. Five years later, Isabelle recognized the depth of Anne-Thérèse's devotion to God and permitted her to leave home to join a convent.

=== Entering religious life ===
On 18 August 1823, Guérin entered the Sisters of Providence of Ruillé-sur-Loir congregation and was given the religious name of Sister Saint Théodore. She professed first vows 8 September 1825, and perpetual vows, which at the time were optional, on 5 September 1831.

Sister Saint Théodore spent her early career as an educator, beginning as a teacher at Preuilly-sur-Claise in central France. In 1826, she began serving as a teacher and superior at the Saint Aubin parish school in Rennes before her transfer to a school at Soulaines in the Diocese of Angers. She began to study medicine and remedies under a local doctor. She ministered to the needs of the area's sick and poor and received a medal for her teaching from the inspector for the Academy of Angers. While working in France, Sister Saint Théodore became seriously ill, most likely with smallpox. Although she recovered, the illness damaged her digestive system. As a result, Sister Saint Théodore could only eat a simple, bland diet for the rest of her life.

== Emigration from France to Indiana ==
In 1839, the Most Reverend Simon William Gabriel Bruté, the first bishop of the vast Diocese of Vincennes in Indiana, sent Vicar General Célestine Guynemer de la Hailandière as a representative to their native France. Bishop Bruté searched for a religious congregation to come to the diocese to teach, provide spiritual instruction, and assist the sick. With only a few priests and a significant influx of Catholic immigrants of French, Irish, and German descent, the diocese needed additional help with its expanding ministry. Bishop Bruté knew the great assistance that a religious order could provide, having worked with Mother Elizabeth Ann Seton and her Sisters of Charity during the founding and early years of Mount Saint Mary's University in Emmitsburg, Maryland.

In June 1839, while Hailandière was in France, Bishop Bruté died at Vincennes, Indiana; Hailandière, his successor, was consecrated a bishop of the diocese on 18 August 1839. One of Bishop Hailandière's first acts was to ask the Sisters of Providence of Ruillé-sur-Loir to send a group of sisters to establish a ministry in Vincennes. Mother Mary, the superior general of the congregation, suggested Sister Saint Théodore for the task. Although Guérin was unsure of her ability to complete such a mission initially, she agreed after considerable discernment. Guérin later remarked that a sentence from the Rule of the congregation convinced her to answer the call to immigrate to the United States: "The Congregation being obliged to work with zeal for the sanctification of souls, the sisters will be disposed to go to whatsoever part of the world obedience calls them."

== Founding a new order in Indiana ==
On 15 July 1840, Sister Saint Théodore and five companions (Sister Olympiade Boyer, Sister Saint Vincent Ferrer Gagé, Sister Basilide Sénéschal, Sister Mary Xavier Lerée, and Sister Mary Liguori Tiercin) departed from France to sail to the United States. After a nearly two-month-long journey across the Atlantic Ocean, the six women traveled by steamboat and stagecoach to reach the dense forest of Indiana.

On 22 October 1840, Guérin and her companions arrived at Saint Mary-of-the-Woods, Indiana, a small, remote village in the wilderness in Vigo County, a few miles northwest of Terre Haute. For several months the sisters lived in a small frontier farmhouse with the Thralls family, along with a few postulants who had been waiting for them when they arrived. Only later did she learn that her French superiors had already decided the sisters in the United States should form a new religious congregation under her leadership. Guérin became known as Mother Théodore.

== Life work ==
=== Educator ===
In July 1841, less than a year after they arrived in Indiana, and despite their meager resources, Mother Théodore and the Sisters of Providence of Saint Mary-of-the-Woods opened Saint Mary's Academy for young women. The academy was the forerunner of Saint Mary-of-the-Woods College. Guérin had doubts that the new institution would succeed. As she reflected in her journals, "It is astonishing that this remote solitude has been chosen for a novitiate and especially for an academy. All appearances are against it."

From the time of her arrival at Saint Mary-of-the-Woods in July 1840 to January 1849, Mother Théodore worked with Catholic parishes to establish parish schools at several sites within the Diocese of Vincennes. In 1843, Guérin traveled to France on a fundraising trip. Bishop Hailandière established two schools in Indiana while Guérin was traveling in France and assigned them to the Sisters of Providence to operate: St. Peter-Montgomery (1843) and Saint Mary Female School-Vincennes (1843).

Guérin personally directed the establishment of Saint Joseph School (1842) in Jasper; Saint Anne's Academy (1844) in Madison; Saint Augustine's (1846) in Fort Wayne; and Saint Vincent's Academy (1849) in Terre Haute, Indiana; as well as a school in Saint Francisville, Illinois. After her return to the United States from a fundraising trip to France, Guérin and the Sisters of Providence established six other schools in Indiana: two in Evansville, Saint Joseph's Academy (1853) and Assumption (1853); Saint Patrick's (1853) in North Madison; Saint Mary's (1853) at Fort Wayne; Saint Mary's (1854) at Lanesville; and Saint Bartholomew (1855) at Columbus.

In addition to establishing schools, Mother Théodore and the Sisters of Providence cooperated with Bishop John Stephen Bazin, Hailandière's successor, and Bishop Jacques-Maurice de Saint-Palais, Bazin's successor, in the establishment of two orphanages in Vincennes and free pharmacies at Vincennes and Saint Mary-of-the-Woods.

=== Business and congregation leader ===
Guérin proved to be a skilled businesswoman and leader and a beloved general superior and spiritual leader of the Sisters of Providence of Saint Mary-of-the-Woods. She arranged to purchase a local farmhouse belonging to the Thralls family to serve as the congregation's first convent at Saint Mary-of-the-Woods. She oversaw the construction of a new Providence convent, which was formally dedicated on 7 August 1854. During the final years, Guerin was planning to build a new chapel at the convent in honor of the Blessed Virgin; however, she did not live to see it completed. The Church of the Immaculate Conception (Saint Mary-of-the-Woods, Indiana), her last major project, was completed in 1886.

Despite numerous challenges and hardships during the congregation's early years, which included rebuilding after destructive fires and crop failures, prudent use of limited finances, and negotiating disagreements with Catholic leaders, Guérin remained devoted to her work and the Sisters of Providence of Saint Mary-of-the-Woods endured. By the time of her death in May 1856, the Sisters of Providence congregation in Indiana had grown from its original six sisters and four postulants to sixty-seven professed members, nine novices, and seven postulants.

=== Death ===
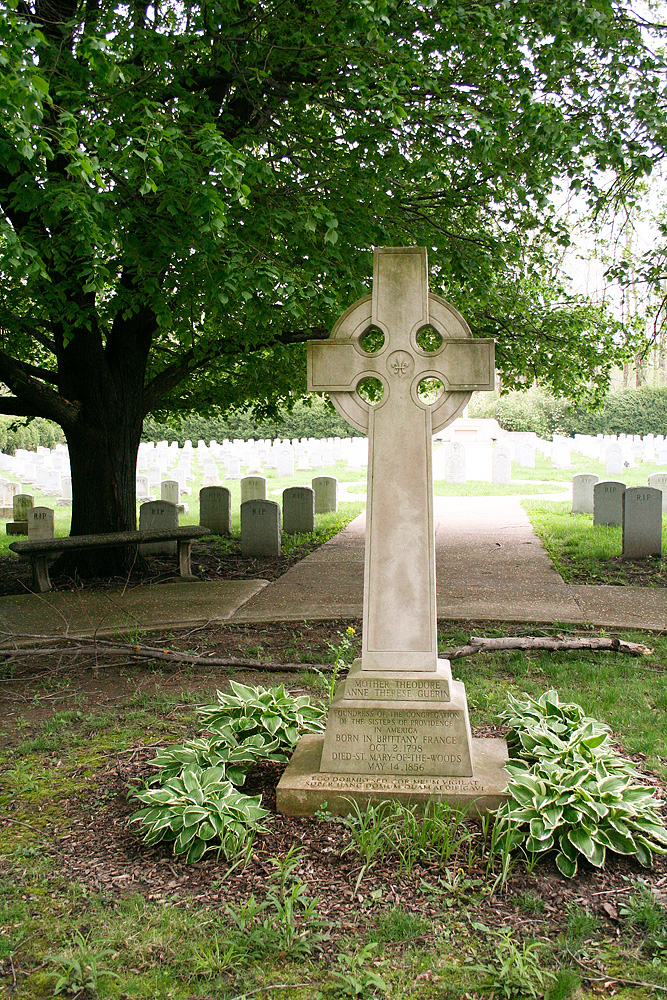
One final resting place of Mother Theodore in the Sisters of Providence Convent Cemetery

Guérin suffered from poor health for most of her adult life; however, her final illness began in March 1856. Guérin died on 14 May 1856 at the motherhouse at Saint Mary-of-the-Woods, Indiana, at fifty-seven.

The Catholic Telegraph and Advocate of Cincinnati, Ohio, published the following notice about Mother Théodore's death:

Died - At Saint Mary's-of-the-Woods (sic), in the 58th year of her age, Wednesday, 14th inst., Sister St. Théodore, Superior General of the Sisters of Providence in Indiana.

This woman, distinguished by her eminent virtues, governed the community of which she was the superior from its commencement to the time of her death, a period of nearly sixteen years. Being a perfect religious herself and endowed with mental qualities of a high order, she was peculiarly fitted to fill the duties which Providence assigned her.

Not only her Sisters are bereaved by her death, but all those who knew her excellence and the amount of good she did, join in lamenting that she should have been removed from the sphere of her usefulness. To judge from the celestial expression of her countenance as she lay in death, there is every reason to believe that she has already taken her abode among the Saints in Heaven, enjoying the munificence of God, who rewards His servants 'according to their works.

Guérin's remains were buried on 15 May 1856 in the Sisters of Providence Cemetery at Saint Mary-of-the-Woods, Indiana. Her grave is marked with a Celtic cross that bears an inscription in Latin, translated as: "I sleep, but my heart watches over this house which I built." In 1907, Guérin's remains were moved to the Church of the Immaculate Conception at Saint Mary-of-the-Woods, although some of her remains are still buried at the original gravesite.

== Veneration ==
Saint Theodora Guérin SP
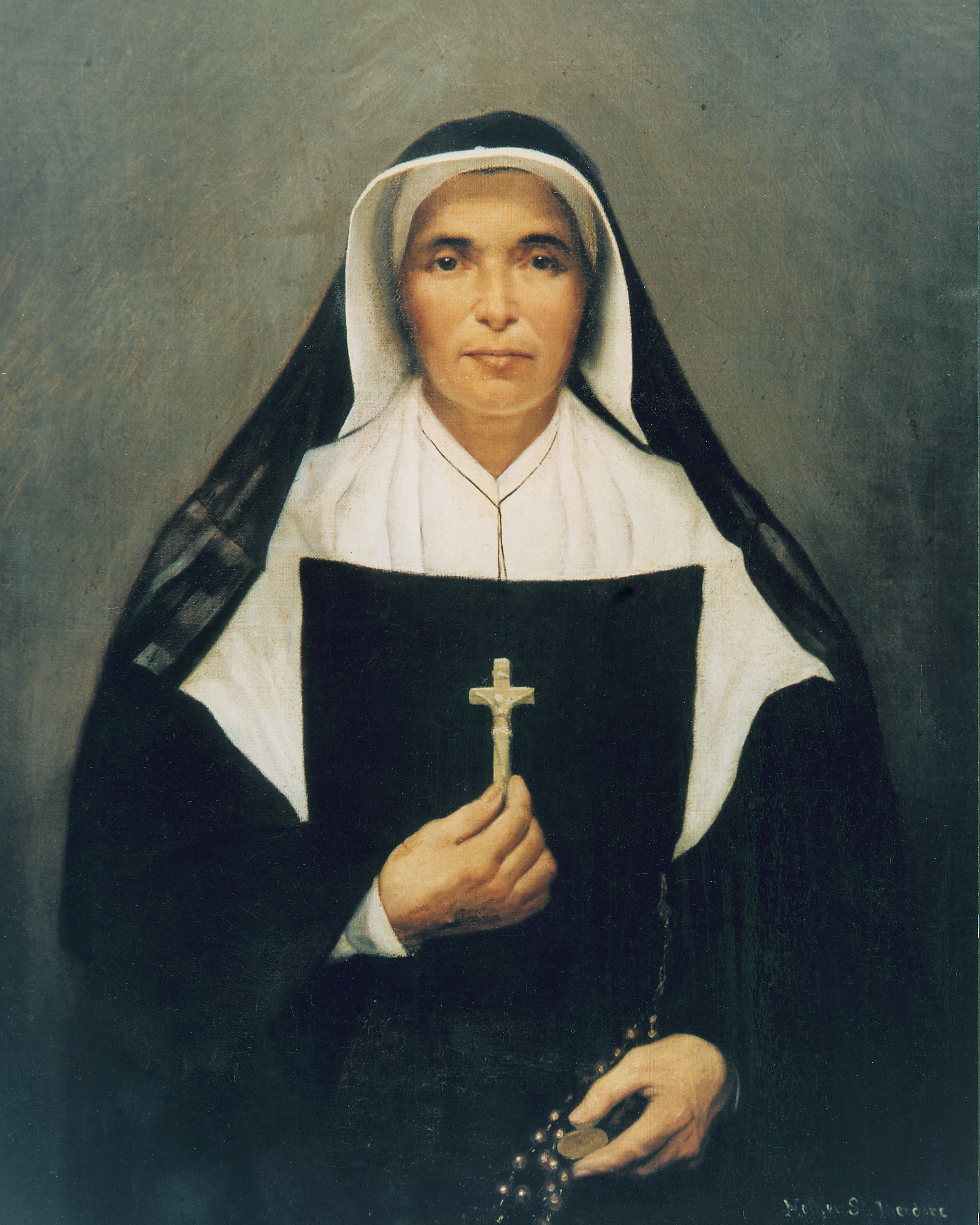
- Portrait painting of Saint Theodora Guérin
- Venerated in: Catholic Church
- Beatified: 25 October 1998, Vatican City by Pope John Paul II
- Canonized: 15 October 2006, Vatican City by Pope Benedict XVI
- Major shrine: Shrine of Saint Mother Theodore Guérin, near the Church of the Immaculate Conception, Saint Mary-of-the-Woods, Indiana
- Feast: 14 May (3 October for the Sisters of Providence and in Indiana)
- Patronage: Diocese of Vincennes, Indiana

=== Cause for sainthood ===
In 1907, Guérin's remains were exhumed from the convent cemetery and moved to the crypt at the Church of the Immaculate Conception at Saint Mary of the Woods. At that time, Bishop Francis Silas Chatard, the first bishop of the Diocese of Indianapolis and a medical doctor before becoming a priest, examined the remains of Mother Théodore. When Bishop Chatard found the brain had not fully decomposed after fifty-one years in the grave, he asked three other physicians to examine his findings. This phenomenon was the first physical sign to consider Guérin's life and service to the people of the area worthy of further investigation. In 1909, after reviewing the medical reports on Guérin's remains, Chatard introduced the Cause for Canonization, the first step in the extensive process of declaring saints in the Roman Catholic Church. During the early phase of the process, twenty-four individuals provided personal accounts of their experiences with Guérin. Theologians approved her spiritual writings on 28 July 1926 and 28 February 1940.

On 25 October 1998, after the first miracle attributed to Guérin was accepted, Pope John Paul II beatified and bestowed the title of "Blessed" on Mother Théodore. In his comments, the Pope recognized her as a "holy woman of God" and "a woman for our time" who "lived a life of extraordinary love." On 1 July 2006, Pope Benedict XVI gave his final approval for her canonization as a saint after agreeing with the consensus view that a second miracle had occurred due to Guérin's intercession. The canonization ceremony was held on 15 October 2006, in Saint Peter's Square, Vatican City. Mother Théodore was given the official name of Saint Theodora Guérin.

=== Attributed miracles ===
The first miracle attributed to Guérin is said to have occurred in 1908. Before going to bed on 30 October, Sister of Providence Mary Theodosia Mug prayed at Guérin's crypt in the Church of the Immaculate Conception on the motherhouse grounds at Saint Mary-of-the-Woods for another sister who was ill. However, Mug herself suffered from damaged nerves in both arms and her right hand, breast cancer, and an abdominal tumor. When she awoke the next day, Sister Mary Theodosia was able to move her arms without pain, and the lump in her abdomen had disappeared. The cancer never returned. Sister Mary Theodosia died of old age in 1943 at the age of eighty-two.

The second of the miracles attributed to Guérin involves Phil McCord of Terre Haute, Indiana, and occurred in January 2001. McCord, who had worked in facilities management for the Sisters of Providence, stopped by the Church of the Immaculate Conception and was drawn in by music from the pipe organ. After entering the church, McCord felt compelled to pray to Guérin, asking for strength to undergo surgery, a cornea transplant for his right eye to improve his failing eyesight (Previous eye surgeries did not fully restore his eyesight, which had deteriorated to a legally-blind status of 20–800 in one eye and 20–1000 in the other.) McCord returned to his home, and when he awoke the next morning, his vision, although still blurry, had improved. A follow-up visit with his eye doctor confirmed that McCord no longer needed the cornea transplant. With subsequent laser treatment, McCord's eyesight returned perfect, 20-20 vision. Ophthalmologists and others investigating the case could find no medical explanation for the change in his condition. In 2006 the Catholic cardinals at the Vatican reviewed and approved the findings in the case and declared the event a miracle, paving the way for the final step in Guérin's canonization process.

== Legacy ==
Guérin rose above numerous personal and professional challenges, such as ideological differences and financial disagreements with other Catholic leaders, frail health, and primitive living conditions in the Indiana wilderness, as well as religious, gender, and cultural prejudice. Guérin also broke barriers for women's education when she and the Sisters of Providence of Saint Mary-of-the-Woods opened an academy for young women in Indiana in 1841. The academy is the forerunner to the present-day Saint Mary-of-the-Woods College, the oldest Catholic women's liberal arts college in the United States. In addition to being a capable businesswoman and school administrator, Guérin was a prolific writer whose journals provide details of her life and work. Still, her greatest legacy is the Sisters of Providence of Saint Mary-of-the-Woods, the congregation she founded in 1840, and its ongoing ministries.

=== Sisters of Providence congregation ===
More than 5,200 women have entered the Sisters of Providence of Saint Mary-of-the-Woods congregation since its founding in 1840. As of 2010, there are nearly 400 sisters in the order. Roughly 300 of them live and minister from the motherhouse grounds at Saint Mary-of-the-Woods, Indiana.

Guérin was working on plans for constructing a new chapel for the Sisters of Providence at the end of her life, but she did not live to see the completion of the Church of the Immaculate Conception at Saint Mary-of-the-Woods. The Sisters of Providence maintain various relics of Guérin's life in their congregation archives at Saint Mary-of-the-Woods, as well as in a Heritage Museum in Providence Center on the motherhouse grounds and the Shrine of Saint Mother Théodore Guérin, which is accessed through the Providence Center.

== Honors and tributes ==
=== Shrine of Saint Mother Theodore Guérin ===
In October 2006, shortly before her canonization, Saint Theodora Guérin's remains were moved from the crypt to the sanctuary of the Church of the Immaculate Conception on the motherhouse grounds at Saint Mary-of-the-Woods, Indiana. The Shrine of Saint Mother Theodore Guérin is located beneath the Blessed Sacrament Chapel near the Church of the Immaculate Conception. The shrine was dedicated in October 2014 under the administration of general superior Sister Denise Wilkinson. It includes a small, simple chapel where Guérin's remains rest in a coffin made of walnut wood from the Sisters of Providence grounds. There are also several rooms in the shrine that contain historical artifacts, relics, photos, and information about Guérin's life and the early days of the Sisters of Providence.

=== Schools ===
Several schools are associated with Guérin and the Sisters of Providence of Saint Mary-of-the-Woods:

- Saint Mary-of-the-Woods College in Saint Mary-of-the-Woods, Indiana
- Guerin College Preparatory High School in River Grove, Illinois
- Saint Theodore Guerin High School, in Noblesville, Indiana
- Providence Cristo Rey High School in Indianapolis, Indiana,

=== Patronage ===
Saint Theodora Guérin has been named a patron saint of:

- Diocese of Lafayette-in-Indiana
- Knights of Columbus of Indianapolis, Indiana
- Archdiocese of Indianapolis
- Education in the Diocese of Fort Wayne-South Bend

=== Other tributes ===
- On 10 October 2006, Mitch Daniels, the governor of Indiana at that time, unveiled one of several highway signs in a ceremony at the Church of the Immaculate Conception that would mark a section along U.S. Route 150 Saint Mary-of-the-Woods, Indiana, as the Saint Mother Theodore Guerin Memorial Highway.
- In 2007, the Society of Indiana Pioneers honored Guérin's canonization by naming her a Hoosier Pioneer; on 6 November 2010, the group named her a Pioneer Founder of Indiana.
- A statue of Guérin, created by artist Teresa Clark, was installed in Mary's Garden at the Basilica of the National Shrine of the Immaculate Conception in Washington, D.C., and dedicated on 10 May 2008.
- In 2009 the Indiana Historical Bureau erected a state historical marker in Guérin's honor on the Sisters of Providence motherhouse grounds at Saint Mary-of-the-Woods, Vigo County, Indiana.
- The Archdiocese of Indianapolis presents its Mother Théodore Guérin Award to educators "who exemplify her values and virtues."

== See also ==
- List of Americans venerated in the Catholic Church
- Saint Mother Théodore Guérin sculpture

Catholic Church titles
Preceded by	General Superior of the Sisters of Providence of Saint Mary-of-the-Woods; 1840 - 1856	Succeeded by Mary Cecilia Bailly, SP
Educational offices
Preceded by	President of Saint Mary-of-the-Woods College; 1841 - 1856	Succeeded by Mary Cecilia Bailly, SP
