= Saint Mary-of-the-Woods, Indiana =

Saint Mary-of-the-Woods
- Unincorporated community
- Nicknames: Saint Mary's, the Woods
- Location of St. Mary of the Woods in Vigo County, Indiana.
- Coordinates: 39°30′44″N 87°27′47″W
- Country: United States
- State: Indiana
- County: Vigo
- Township: Sugar Creek

Area
  - Total: 1.26 sq mi (3.26 km^{2})
  - Land: 1.24 sq mi (3.21 km^{2})
  - Water: 0.019 sq mi (0.05 km^{2})
- Elevation: 597 ft (182 m)

Population (2020)
  - Total: 767
  - Density: 618.9/sq mi (238.96/km^{2})
- Time zone: UTC-5 (Eastern (EST))
  - Summer (DST): UTC-4 (EDT)
- ZIP code: 47876
- Area codes: 812, 930
- GNIS feature ID: 2583468

Saint Mary-of-the-Woods, often called St. Mary's, is an unincorporated community in Sugar Creek Township in northwestern Vigo County, in the U.S. state of Indiana. The community is part of the Terre Haute Metropolitan Statistical Area. A large portion of Saint Mary-of-the-Woods along U.S. Route 150 is taken up by the grounds of the Sisters of Providence of Saint Mary-of-the-Woods, which contain the motherhouse of the Sisters of Providence as well as Saint Mary-of-the-Woods College.

Although Saint Mary-of-the-Woods is unincorporated, it has a post office, with the ZIP code of 47876. It had a population of 797 at the 2010 census.

== History ==
The earliest land records in Saint Mary-of-the-Woods date back to 1825, when George and Polly Smith acquired a land patent signed by Andrew Jackson. It is likely that this was a land grant for military service, as George Smith served as an aide and dispatch bearer to George Washington during the American Revolution. In the following years several other settlers acquired acreage from the United States government. From the Smiths, a Joseph Thralls and his family acquired a significant parcel of land in 1835.

Records from 1838 show a purchase of land transferring from Joseph and Sarah Thralls to Bishop Simon Bruté of the Roman Catholic Diocese of Vincennes for a sum of fifteen dollars. Bruté was concerned with establishing a Catholic mission for the surrounding Terre Haute area and built a small frame church, the first in Vigo County.

In 1840, Saint Mother Theodore Guerin arrived in Saint Mary-of-the-Woods with several companions and found a dense forest with few buildings. There she established the Sisters of Providence of Saint Mary-of-the-Woods, a Roman Catholic congregation of women. Originally, the Thralls family provided housing for the sisters.

As the Sisters of Providence grew in number, the town of St. Mary's also expanded. In April 1850, twenty men from the village had left for California in search of gold. Despite this, by 1851, Sister of Providence Sister Saint Francis Xavier wrote, "Now we have quite a little country town... We have in the village a post office, two little inns, three or four stores, wheelwrights, coopers, carpenters, blacksmiths, shoemakers, cabinet makers, etc."

A post office was established under the name St. Mary's in 1846. It was renamed to Saint Mary Of The Woods in 1912, and is still in operation.

== Demographics ==
Historical population
Census	Pop.	Note	%±
2010	797		—
2020	767		−3.8%
U.S. Decennial Census

== Education ==
All areas in Vigo County are in the Vigo County School Corporation. Saint Mary-of-the-Woods is zoned to Fayette Elementary School, West Vigo Middle School and West Vigo High School.
