= Diocese of Vincennes =

Former Roman Catholic diocese in the United States

The Diocese of Vincennes (Latin: Dioecesis Vincennapolis) is a former Catholic diocese in the State of Indiana in the United States. It was erected on May 6, 1834, the first diocese in Indiana and one of the earliest in the United States. The diocese was suppressed on March 28, 1898. The Vincennes area is now part of the Diocese of Evansville. The Diocese of Vincennes was re-created in 1995 by the Vatican as a titular see.

When it was erected in 1834, the Diocese of Vincennes covered all of Indiana and the eastern third of Illinois, including what was then the small village of Chicago. Its see city was Vincennes, Indiana, with Saint Francis Xavier as its cathedral. In 1843, the Vatican erected the Diocese of Chicago from the Illinois portion of the Diocese of Vincennes. The Vatican in 1857 formed the Diocese of Fort Wayne from the northern half of Indiana. Due to the rapid growth of Indianapolis, Indiana, the Vatican in 1898 suppressed the Diocese of Vincennes, replacing it with the Diocese of Indianapolis.

== Bishops of Vincennes ==
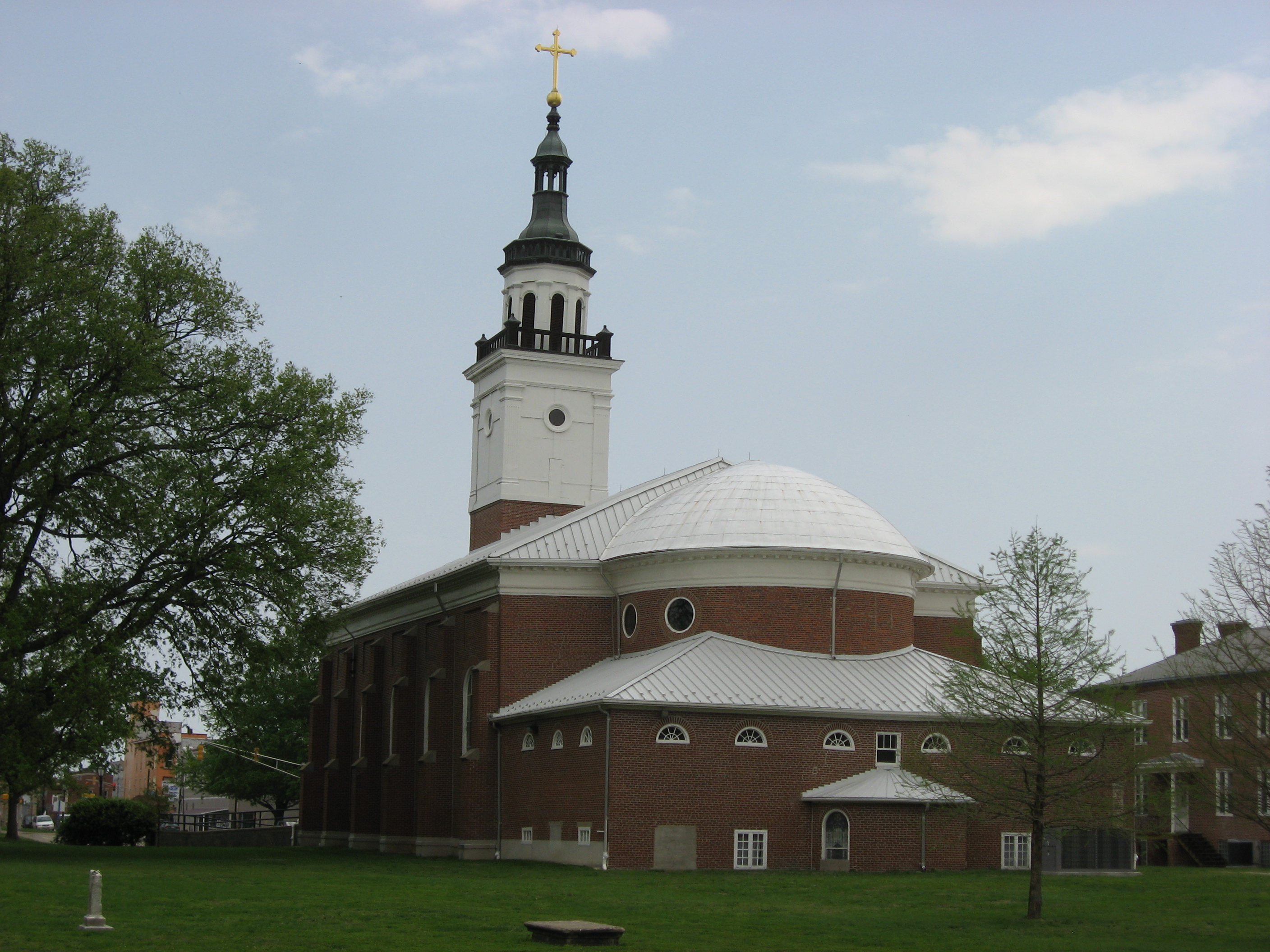
Basilica of Saint Francis Xavier, Vincennes, Indiana (2011)

1. Simon Bruté de Rémur (October 28, 1834 – June 26, 1839)
2. Célestine de la Hailandière (August 18, 1839 – March 29, 1847)
3. Jean Bazin (October 24, 1847 – April 23, 1848)
4. Jacques Maurice de Saint Palais (January 14, 1849 – June 28, 1877) Saint Palais also served as diocesan administrator from April 23, 1848, to January 14, 1849.
5. Francis Silas Chatard (May 12, 1878 – September 7, 1918) Chatard became the first bishop of Indianapolis on March 28, 1898.

Bruté, Hailandière, Bazin and Saint Palais were interred in the crypt of the Basilica of St. Francis Xavier in Vincennes. Chatard is interred at Calvary Cemetery in Indianapolis.

== History ==
=== Early history ===
Before the Vatican erected the Diocese of Vincennes in 1834, its territory passed through three other dioceses:

- Diocese of Quebec – 1675 to 1789
- Diocese of Baltimore, Maryland – 1789 to 1808
- Diocese of Bardstown, Kentucky – 1808 to 1834

==== Diocese of Quebec ====
During the 17th and early 18th centuries, present-day Indiana was part of New France, the French colony in North America. The Diocese of Quebec, headquartered in Quebec City in present-day Canada, had jurisdiction over all the Catholics in the Colony. It is believed that the diocese sent the first Jesuit missionaries to present-Vincennes around 1675. The Jesuit missionary Jean Mermet arrived in the area around 1712, but he may not have stayed long.

The first Catholic Church at Vincennes, St. Francis Xavier, was established around 1732. Father Sebastian Louis Meurin, St. Francis Xavier's first resident priest, arrived in Vincennes in May 1748, but the earliest records of the Catholic Church in Vincennes, Indiana date to April 21, 1749. In 1753, during the French-Indian War between France and Great Britain, Meurin left Vincennes. After the end of the war, Great Britain took over New France; the Diocese of Quebec retained its jurisdiction over the Catholics in the region.

Sever itinerant priests visited Indiana during the late 18th century, including Father Pierre Gibault, who visited the area in 1770. During this early period, the Catholic communities in the area experienced hardships due to epidemics, the American Revolution and conflicts with Native Americans. The Diocese of Quebec lacked money and priests to support them. With the end of the revolution in 1783, the Indiana area passed from British to American control. Gibault served as the resident priest at St. Francis Xavier from 1785 to 1789.

==== Diocese of Baltimore ====
With the end of the American Revolution, the Vatican decided to create an American diocese, removing any control from British dioceses. On November 6, 1789, Pope Pius VI erected the Diocese of Baltimore in Baltimore, Maryland, the first Catholic diocese in the United States, and appointed Reverend John Carroll as its first bishop. The diocese encompassed the entire nation, including Indiana. In 1791, Carroll sent Reverend Benedict Joseph Flaget to succeed Gibault at St. Francis Xavier Parish in Vincennes. Flaget arrived at Vincennes on December 21, 1792. Flaget opened a school and held classes at St. Francis Xavier church. The school's curriculum included religious studies, music, and vocational training. Reverend John Francis Rivet, Flaget's successor, arrived at Vincennes in 1796 to continue Flaget's work. Rivet, who received a $200 annual salary from the U.S. Congress, became the first public school teacher in the Northwest Territory. He died in 1804.

==== Diocese of Bardstown ====
In 1808, responding to the population growth in the United States, Pope Pius VII created four new dioceses. The frontier areas of the American Midwest, including Indiana, became part of the Diocese of Bardstown, headquartered in Bardstown, Kentucky. Flaget was appointed as its first bishop. In 1814, Flaget returned to Indiana, became the first Catholic bishop to visit the territory. In 1832, recognizing the rapid growth of the area, Flaget and Bishop Joseph Rosati of the Diocese of St. Louis, petitioned Pope Gregory XVI to establish a diocese in Indiana.

=== Bishop Bruté (1834–1839) ===
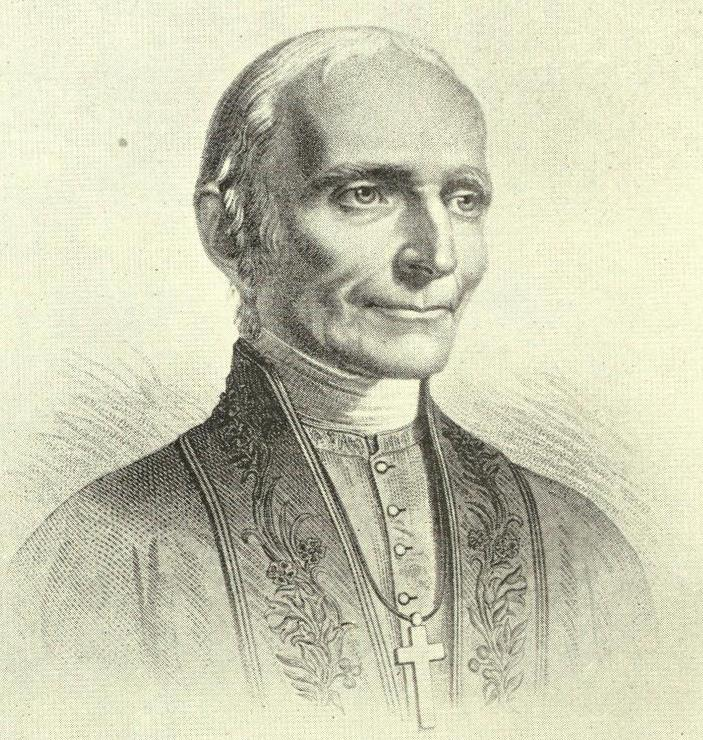
Bishop Brute (1891)

On May 6, 1834 Pope Gregory XVI erected the Diocese of Vincennes and named Simon Bruté de Rémur, a French priest, as its first bishop. He was consecrated on October 28, 1834, at St. Louis, and arrived at Vincennes on November 5, 1834. Bruté designated Saint Francis Xavier Church as his cathedral.

At the time of Bruté's installation, the new Diocese of Vincennes had only three priests ministering to Catholics scattered across Indiana and the eastern third of Illinois. Bruté visited each Catholic family in the diocese, regardless of the distance from his rectory at Vincennes. He also founded a college at Vincennes in 1837, and connected it to a theological seminary for men to train for the priesthood which had been established under the Congregation of Jesus or "Eudists". In 1839, they purchased a building on the site of the first Vincennes University, which failed, and named the new school St. Gabriel's College. The college closed in 1845, but its building was home to St. Rose Academy until it moved to a new location in 1884. Bruté died in Vincennes on June 26, 1839.

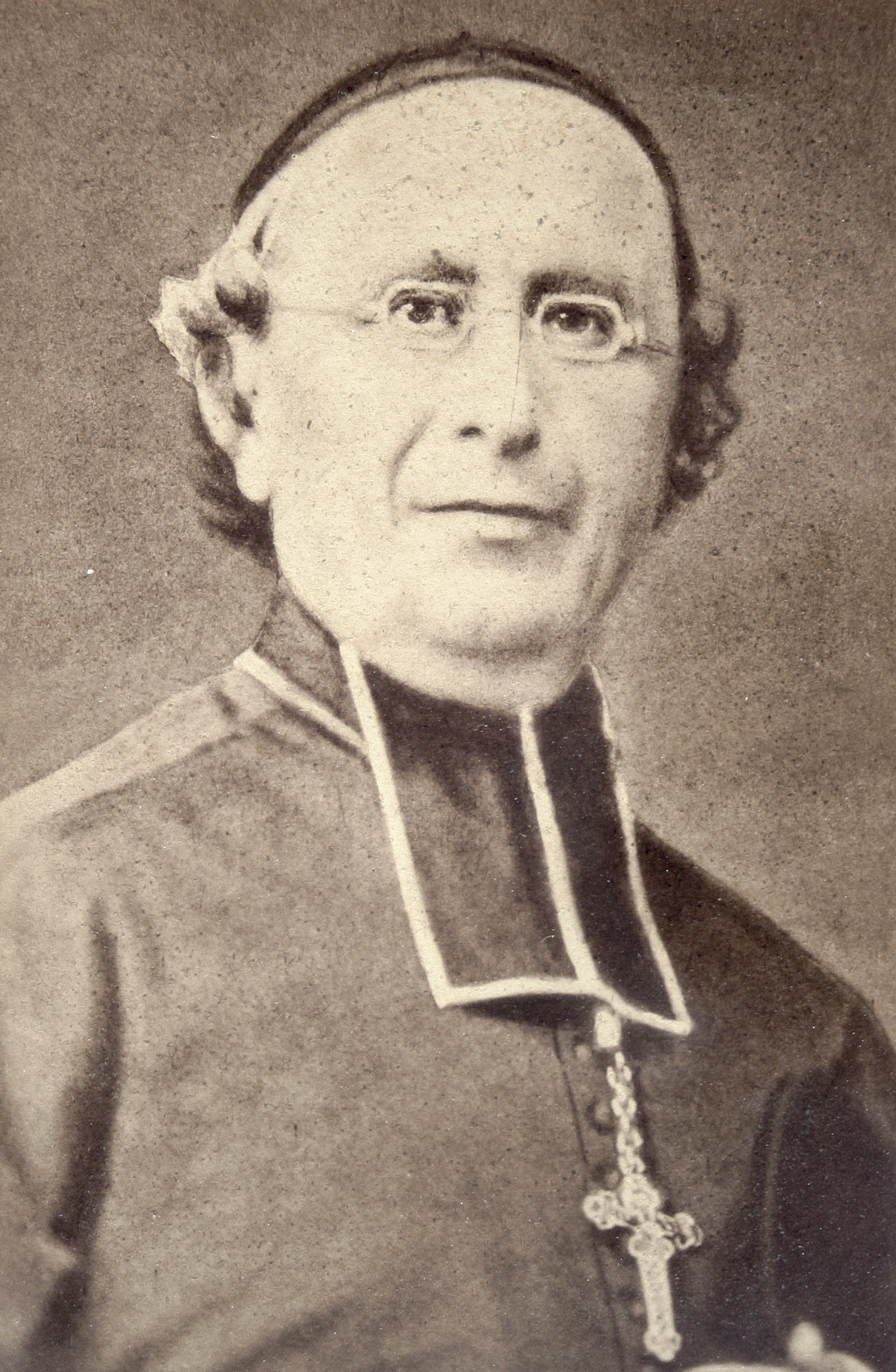
Bishop Hailandière (pre-1882)

=== Bishop Hailandière (1839–1847) ===
Father Célestine Guynemer de la Hailandière, a French priest serving as Bruté's vicar general, was consecrated as the second bishop of Vincennes on August 18, 1839, at the Chapel of Sacred Heart in Paris, France. Hailandière remained in France for several months after his consecration, raising funds and making arrangements for improvements to the diocese. His most significant achievements included the completion of St. Francis Xavier Cathedral at Vincennes, and construction of a library to house Bruté's collection of more than 5,000 books and religious documents. He consecrated the cathedral on August 8, 1841.

Hailandière arranged for the Sisters of Providence to establish their order within the diocese, and encouraged the Brothers of the Holy Cross to establish schools for boys. He also called on Catholic leaders, including Father Edward Sorin, founder of the University of Notre Dame, and Mother Théodore Guérin, founder of Sisters of Providence of Saint Mary-of-the-Woods, to join him in Indiana.

In 1843, the Vatican erected the Diocese of Chicago, taking its territory from the Diocese of Vincennes. Despite de Hailandière' efforts in Indiana, its population grew slowly and the institutions that he helped to establish suffered many problems. He became discouraged and resigned as bishop of Vincennes in 1847.

=== Bishop Bazin (1847–1848) ===
John Stephen Bazin, Hailandière's successor, was appointed the third bishop of Vincennes on September 3, 1847. He was the first bishop ordained in Indiana. Bazin's consecration took place at St. Francis Xavier Cathedral on October 24, 1847. Within a few months of his consecration, Bazin was in failing health. He appointed Jacques Maurice de St. Palais, his vicar general, as diocesan administrator. Bazin died at Vincennes on April 23, 1848.

=== Bishop Saint Palais (1849–1878) ===
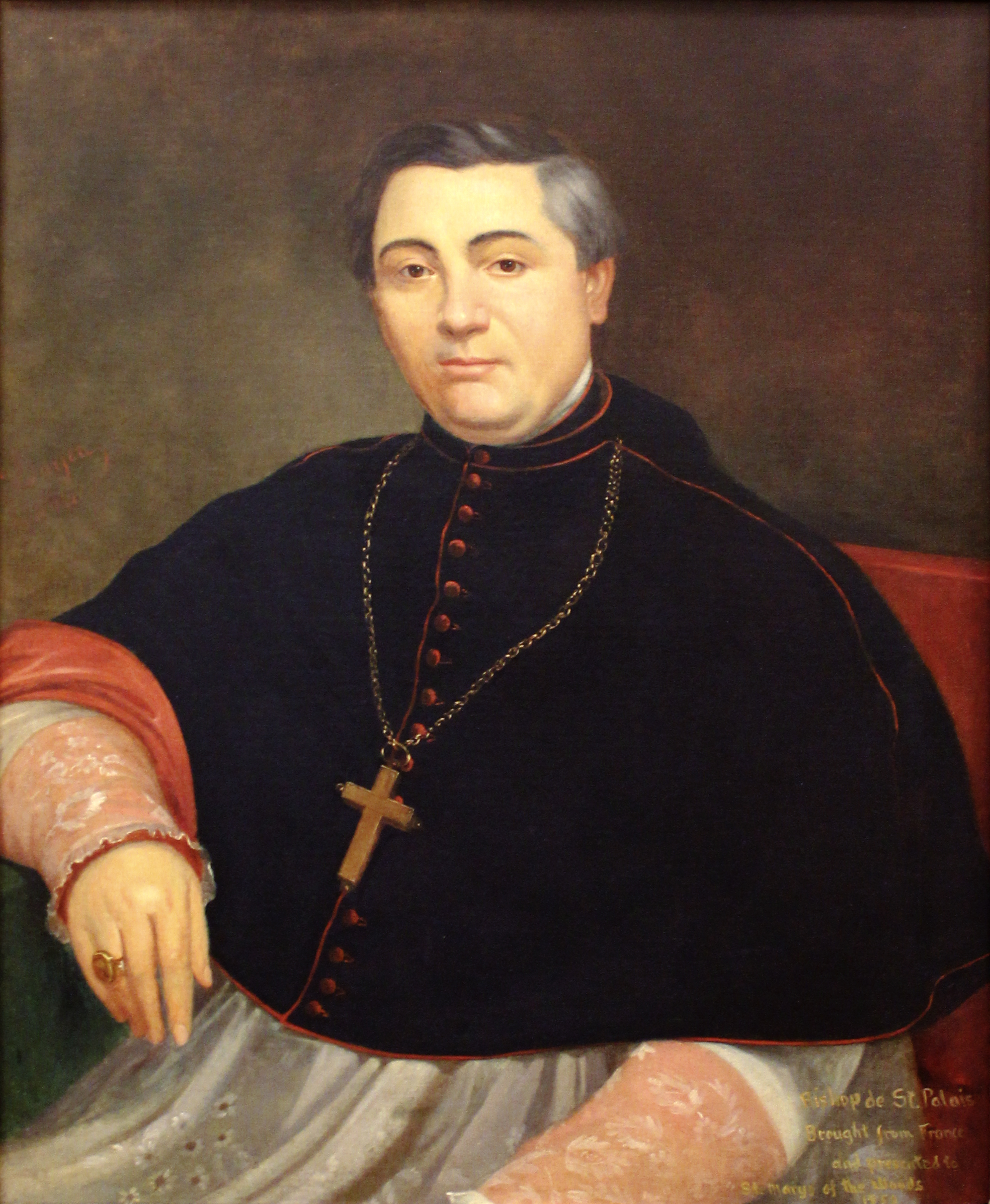
Bishop Saint Palais (pre-1877)

St. Palais was consecrated as the fourth bishop of Vincennes on January 14, 1849, at Vincennes. During his tenure as bishop, he had to resolve debts from Hailandière's episcopacy, deal with a cholera epidemic and expand schools in the diocese. In 1849, Guerin established St. Ann's orphanage in Vincennes, and in 1853 monks from Einsiedeln, Switzerland, founded St. Meinrad abbey and seminary in Southern Indiana, but plans to open a school for African-Americans was never carried out.

On January 8, 1857, the Vatican erected the Diocese of Fort Wayne, taking Northern Indiana from the Diocese of Vincennes. During the American Civil War of the early 1860s, several priests from the diocese served as chaplains with the Union Army. After the war, Saint Palais recognized that Indianapolis, now the biggest city in the diocese, should be the location for his see. However, he deferred this decision to his successor. Saint Palais died on June 28, 1877. At the time of his death, the diocese had 151 churches, with 117 priests serving 90,000 Catholics.

=== Bishop Chatard (1878–1898) ===
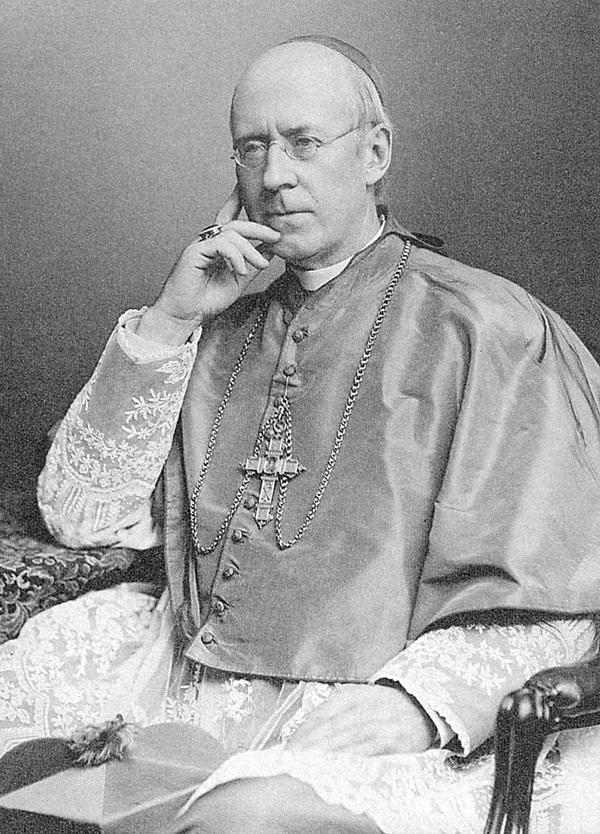
Bishop Chatard (pre-1918)

Francis Silas Chatard was consecrated as bishop of Vincennes in Rome, Italy, on May 12, 1878. He became the first native Hoosier (Indiana native) to become bishop. Chatard established his residence at Indianapolis after his consecration. He later petitioned the Vatican to transfer the episcopal see to Indianapolis.

=== Suppression of Diocese of Vincennes ===
Pope Leo XIII suppressed the Diocese of Vincennes and erected the Diocese of Indianapolis on March 28, 1898, with Chatard becoming its first bishop. The city of Vincennes, the former seat of the Diocese of Vincennes, became part of the newly created Diocese of Evansville and St. Francis Xavier became a church again. In 1970, the Vatican designated St. Francis as a basilica.

In 1995, the Vatican restored the former Diocese of Vincennes as the titular episcopal see of Vincennes, and in 1997 appointed Bishop Gerald Eugene Wilkerson as its first titular bishop.
