= Chatard =

Chatard is a surname. Notable people with the surname include:

- Frederick Chatard (1807–1897), American naval officer
- Silas Chatard (1834–1918), Catholic bishop
