= List of the oldest buildings in Indiana =

This article lists the oldest extant buildings in Indiana, including extant buildings and structures constructed prior to and during the United States rule over Indiana. Only buildings built prior to 1820 are suitable for inclusion on this list, or the building must be the oldest of its type.

In order to qualify for the list, a structure must:

- be a recognizable building (defined as any human-made structure used or intended for supporting or sheltering any use or continuous occupancy);
- incorporate features of building work from the claimed date to at least 1.5 metres (4.9 ft) in height and/or be a listed building.

This consciously excludes ruins of limited height, roads and statues. Bridges may be included if they otherwise fulfill the above criteria. Dates for many of the oldest structures have been arrived at by radiocarbon dating or dendrochronology and should be considered approximate. If the exact year of initial construction is estimated, it will be shown as a range of dates.

== List of oldest buildings ==
Building	Image	Location	First built	Use	Notes
Grouseland		Vincennes, Indiana	1802–1804	Residence	Home of president William Henry Harrison It is the oldest standing building in Indiana.
Indiana Territorial Capitol		Vincennes, Indiana	1804	Government	First territorial capitol of Indiana; moved from original foundation in 1949
Mont Clair Farmhouse		Knox County, Indiana	1806	Residence	
The French House		Vincennes, Indiana	ca. 1806–1809	Residential	Built by an early French fur trader, also known as the Michel Brouillet House
Westfall House		Corydon, Indiana	ca. 1807	Residential	
Branham Tavern		Corydon, Indiana	ca. 1808	Commercial	
Kintner-McGrain House		Corydon, Indiana	ca. 1808	Residential	
Thomas Downs House		Charlestown, Indiana	ca. 1809	Residential	Built for Thomas Downs, Clark County's first treasurer
316 Ferry Street		Vevay, Indiana	ca. 1810	Commercial	
Veraestau		Dearborn County, Indiana	ca. 1810	Residence	
John Work House		Charlestown Township, Clark County, Indiana	ca. 1811	Residential	Built for miller John Work
Old Salisbury Courthouse		Centerville, Indiana	ca. 1811	Courthouse	One of the oldest remaining courthouses in the Northwest Territory.
Little Cedar Grove Baptist Church		Mound Haven, Indiana	ca. 1812	Church	Oldest church on its original foundation
Scribner House		New Albany, Indiana	ca. 1813–1814	Residence	Oldest building in New Albany. Built by one of the town's founders Joel Scribner
Aunt Lucy Detraz House		Vevay, Indiana	ca. 1814	Residence	
Barrett-Gate House		New Harmony, Indiana	ca. 1814	Residence	
David McCormick Tavern		Vevay, Indiana	ca. 1814	Commercial/ Residence	
Eigner Barn		New Harmony, Indiana	ca. 1814	Outbuilding	
Potter's Barn		New Harmony, Indiana	ca. 1814	Outbuilding	
Potter's Cabin		New Harmony, Indiana	ca. 1814	Residence	
Weber Cabin		New Harmony, Indiana	ca. 1814	Residence	
346 Granary Street		New Harmony, Indiana	ca. 1814	Residence	
Old State Capitol		Corydon, Indiana	ca. 1814–1816	Government	The second territorial capitol and the first state capitol of Indiana.
Blue River Friends Hicksite Meeting House		Washington County Indiana	ca.1815	Church	The oldest Quaker meeting house standing in the state.
505 Granary Street		New Harmony, Indiana	ca. 1815	Residence	
Armstrong Tavern		Vevay, Indiana	ca. 1816	Commercial/ Residence	Oldest known meeting place of the Masonic Lodge in Indiana.
Benjamin Ferguson House		Charlestown, Indiana	ca. 1816	Residence	Built for state senator Benjamin Ferguson
Empire House, Indiana		Rising Sun, Indiana	ca. 1816	Residence/ Commercial	
Perret Dufour House		Vevay, Indiana	ca. 1816	Residence	
Adams-Payne House		Corydon, Indiana	ca. 1817	Residence	
Governor Hendricks' Headquarters		Corydon, Indiana	ca. 1817	Residence/ Government	
Heth House		Corydon, Indiana	ca. 1817	Residence	
Israel Whitehead House		Vevay, Indiana	ca. 1817	Residence	
Old Treasury Building		Corydon, Indiana	ca. 1817	Government	
Posey House		Corydon, Indiana	ca. 1817	Residence	
Schofield House		Madison, Indiana	ca. 1817	Residence	The location of where the Grand Lodge of Indiana was formed in 1818.
Jasper City Mill		Jasper, Indiana	ca. 1817	Commercial	
Harmonist Granary		New Harmony, Indiana	ca. 1818	Commercial	
James Brown Ray Home		Brookville, Indiana	ca. 1818	Residence	
James N. Tyner House		Brookville, Indiana	ca. 1818	Residence	
Jeremiah Sullivan House		Madison, Indiana	ca. 1818	Residence	
Old Perry County Courthouse		Rome, Indiana	ca. 1818	Courthouse	
Richard Talbott Inn		Madison, Indiana	ca. 1818	Commercial/ Residence	
Talbott House		Madison, Indiana	ca. 1818	Residence	
Vance-Tousey House		Lawrenceburg, Indiana	ca. 1818	Residence	
Eigner Cabin		New Harmony, Indiana	ca. 1819	Residence	
George Keppler House		New Harmony, Indiana	ca. 1819	Residence	
Jesse Hunt Hotel		Lawrenceburg, Indiana	ca. 1819	Commercial	
Porter Law Office		Corydon, Indiana	ca. 1819	Commercial	
Salomon-Wolf House		New Harmony, Indiana	ca. 1819	Residence	
510 Church Street		New Harmony, Indiana	ca. 1819	Residence	
Sanders-Childers House		Indianapolis, Indiana	ca. 1820	Residence	Oldest house in Indianapolis, built by William Sanders around 1820
St. Francis Xavier Cathedral		Vincennes, Indiana	ca. 1826	Church	Oldest Catholic Church in Indiana
Richardville House		Fort Wayne, Indiana	ca. 1827	Residence	Oldest building in Fort Wayne, built for Chief Richardville

== See also ==
- National Register of Historic Places listings in Indiana
- History of Indiana
- Oldest buildings in the United States
