= Grouseland =

Historic house in Indiana, United States

- William Henry Harrison House
- U.S. National Register of Historic Places
- U.S. National Historic Landmark
- U.S. Historic district – Contributing property
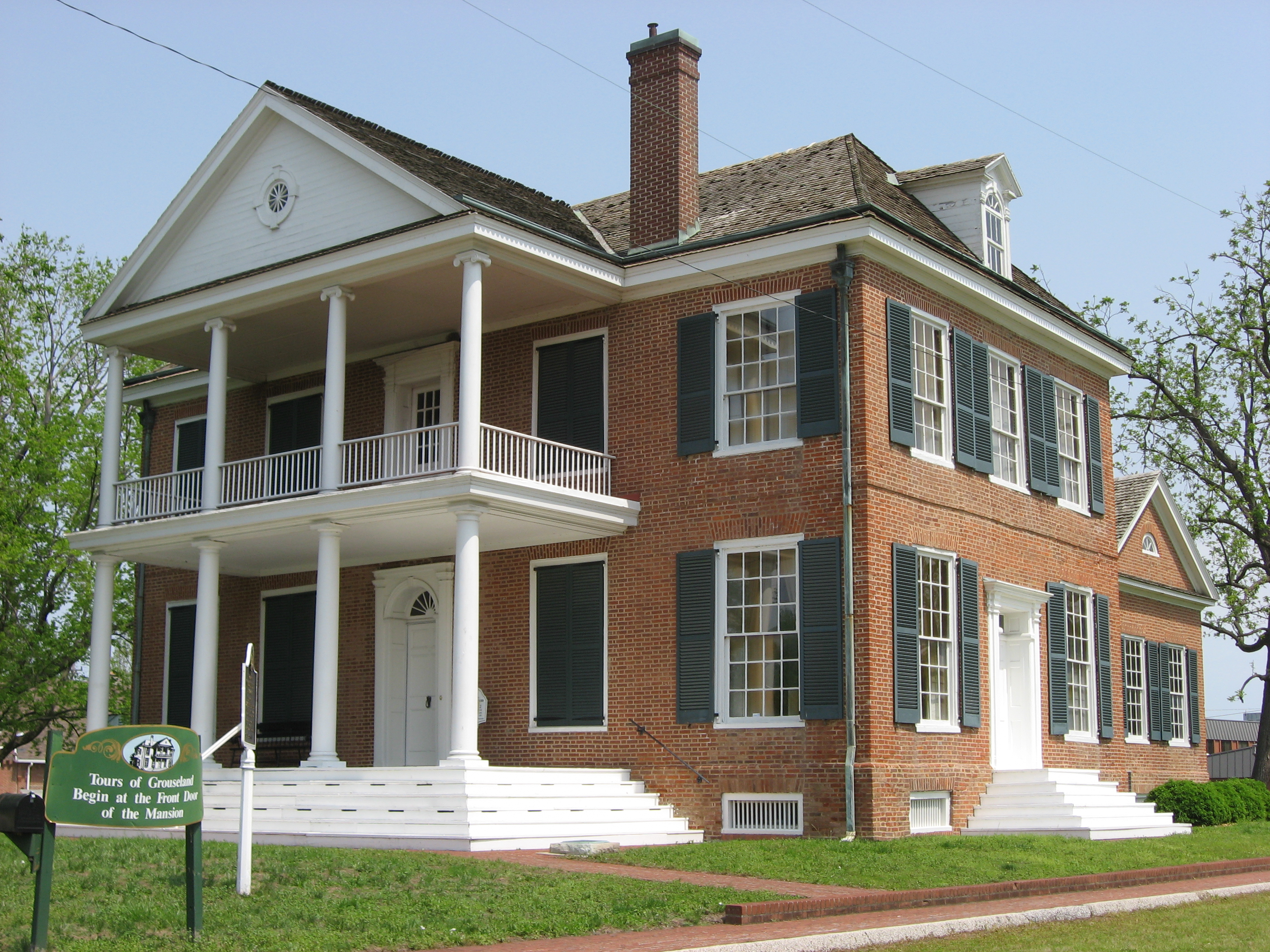
- Location: 3 W. Scott St., Vincennes, Indiana
- Coordinates: 38°41′7.76″N 87°31′33.62″W
- Built: 1804
- Architect: William Lindsay
- Architectural style: Federal
- NRHP reference No.: 66000018

Significant dates
- Added to NRHP: October 15, 1966
- Designated NHL: December 19, 1960

Grouseland, the William Henry Harrison Mansion and Museum, is a National Historic Landmark important for its Federal-style architecture and role in American history. The two-story, red brick home was built between 1802 and 1804 in Vincennes, Indiana, for William Henry Harrison (1773–1841) during his tenure from 1801 to 1812 as the first governor of the Indiana Territory. The residence was completed in 1804, and Harrison reportedly named it Grouseland due to the abundance of grouse in the area.

== History ==
=== Construction ===
In 1800, U.S. president John Adams appointed twenty-seven-year-old William Henry Harrison the first governor of the Indiana Territory. Soon after his arrival in Vincennes in 1801, Harrison began planning the construction of a home on 300 acres (120 ha) of land he purchased adjacent to the town. When Harrison was certain of remaining for a second term as territorial governor, construction began on his Federal-style mansion, which was built between 1802 and 1804.

Grouseland was home to William Henry and Anna Tuthill (Symmes) Harrison and their children until 1812. At least three of the Harrisons' ten children were born at Grouseland, including John Scott Harrison, the father of Benjamin Harrison (the 23rd president of the United States). The Harrisons left Grouseland in 1812 and moved to North Bend, Ohio. Harrison served in the U.S. Army during the War of 1812, and later as a member of the Ohio Senate, the U.S. House of Representatives, and the U.S. Senate before his election in 1840 as the 9th president of the United States.

Grouseland was designed by the architect William Lindsay and constructed in the Federal style, reminiscent of the aristocratic homes where Harrison spent his boyhood in Virginia. Grouseland was a marked contrast to the log cabins of the Indiana Territory's other residents. In the early 19th century, the territory was on the edge of the American frontier with few established roads, and Vincennes, the territorial capital, had an American and French population estimated at only 700. Grouseland was built at great personal expense to Governor Harrison; it is believed to have cost an estimated US$20,000 at the time of its construction.

Grouseland's builder used skilled labor and local bricks manufactured not far from Vincennes. It is believed to have been the first brick building in Vincennes as well as the Indiana Territory. Limestone blocks for the home's foundation were obtained from nearby quarries. Grouseland was decorated in grand style with items imported from Europe. At least one biographer surmises that Harrison's motives in constructing such an elaborate home in the wilderness included establishing the respect due to him as governor, despite his relative youth at the time. Grouseland reflected Harrison's position and marked his place in American aristocracy. (William Henry Harrison was the youngest son of Benjamin Harrison V, a signer of the Declaration of Independence.)

=== Governor's home ===
During Harrison's governorship of the Indiana Territory, Grouseland was the focal point of the social and official life of the territory. Visiting legislators were frequently entertained and overnight guests at the governor's home. (When it was the capital of the Northwest Territory, more territory was governed from Vincennes than any city outside Washington, D.C.) Governor Harrison also met with Indian leaders that included Little Turtle, Buckongahelas, and other representatives from various American Indian tribes to negotiate a number of important land cession treaties. (Harrison's eleven treaties with Native American leaders between 1803 and 1809 resulted in cession of American Indian lands in the southern third of present-day Indiana and most of Illinois, comprising millions of acres of land for future settlement.) Five of the land-ceding treaties that Harrison negotiated with Native American leaders were signed at Grouseland, including the Treaty of Grouseland (1805), which was signed in the mansion's council chamber (main floor parlor).

Harrison also had two confrontations with the Shawnee leader Tecumseh at Grouseland. On August 12, 1810, Harrison met with Tecumseh, who was accompanied by 100 to 400 braves (sources report different numbers), on the lawn in front of Grouseland. The meeting lasted for eight days but ended without a treaty. Their differences were later settled in battle as part of Tecumseh's War. Harrison defeated Tenskwatawa (the Prophet), who was Tecumseh's brother, at the Battle of Tippecanoe in 1811, and defeated Tecumseh at Battle of the Thames in 1813.

=== Other uses ===
After Harrison's departure from Grouseland in 1812, its next resident was Judge Benjamin Parke. In 1821, Grouseland was deeded to Harrison's son, John Cleves Symmes Harrison, who lived in the home with his wife, Clarissa, and their six children for about ten years. Harrison family heirs retained their home until 1850. Afterwards, Grouseland served several purposes, including a grain warehouse, library, hotel, and a private residence.

=== Preservation ===
In 1909 the Vincennes Water Company acquired the property and planned to demolish the historic home and use the site for other purposes. However, the Francis Vigo Chapter of the Daughters of the American Revolution raised funds to purchase the home and save it from demolition. By 1916 the local DAR chapter had raised US$2,000 from the community and were given a limited deed to property. The DAR restored the home to the period when William Henry Harrison lived there, including furnishing it with a few Harrison family possessions. It opened as a historical museum in 1911. The City of Vincennes acquired the water company in 1935 and gave the local DAR chapter a quitclaim deed to Grouseland.

=== House museum ===
Grouseland was designated a National Historic Landmark in 1960 and listed on the National Register of Historical Places in 1966. Situated at the northwest corner of Park and Scott streets, within the present-day Vincennes Historic District, it is owned by the local chapter of the Daughters of the American Revolution, the organization that saved the building from destruction. The property is maintained by the Grouseland Foundation, a volunteer board of directors composed of DAR and non-DAR members that manages the structure and programs. The Grouseland Rifle is owned by the Foundation and exhibited at Grouseland; dating from the early 19th century, it has been designated the state firearm of Indiana. The main campus of Vincennes University is adjacent to the property. Other state historic sites in Vincennes include the Territorial Capitol building.

== Description ==
Grouseland's present-day site on a half-city block about 100 yards (91 m) from the Wabash River was part of Harrison's 300-acre (120-hectare) estate in Vincennes. The two-story, redbrick home in the Federal style has a high roof and dormer windows with an attic. The structure rests on a basement with a limestone foundation. The main house and rear dependency are joined by a covered passage. The first floor of the main house has a parlor (council chamber) to the left and a dining room to the right of an entry and hallway leading to a library at the rear. The second floor has six bedrooms and a passageway connecting to the rear dependency.

== See also ==
- List of residences of presidents of the United States
- List of museums in Indiana
- List of the oldest buildings in Indiana
- Presidential memorials in the United States
- List of National Historic Landmarks in Indiana
- National Register of Historic Places listings in Knox County, Indiana
