= Jacques-Maurice De Saint Palais =

American prelate (1811–1877)

His Excellency, The Right Reverend Jacques-Maurice De Saint Palais
- Bishop of Vincennes
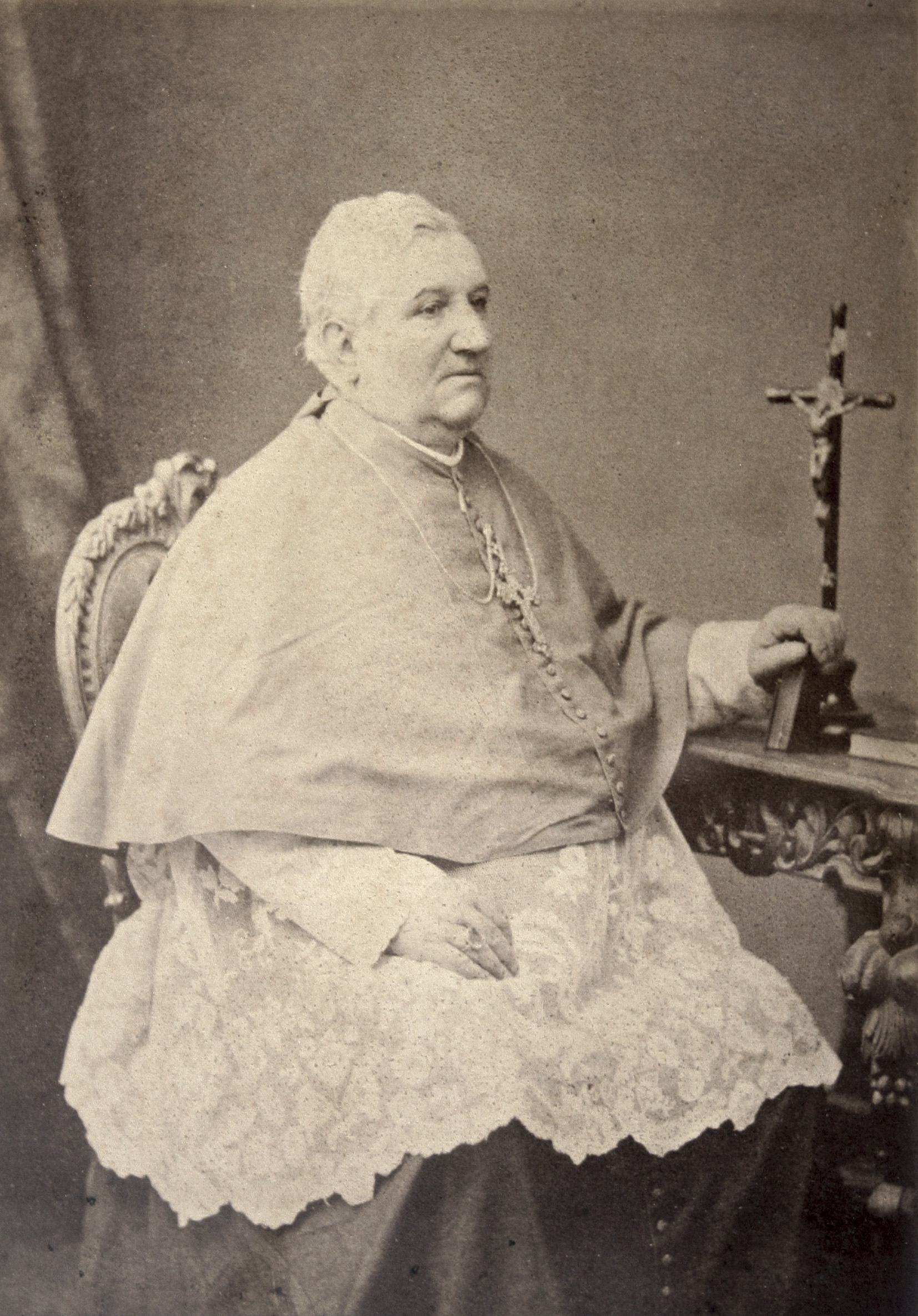
- Church: Roman Catholic Church
- Diocese: Diocese of Vincennes
- In office: October 3, 1848—June 28, 1877
- Predecessor: John Stephen Bazin
- Successor: Francis Silas Marean Chatard

Orders
- Ordination: May 28, 1836
- Consecration: January 14, 1849 by Richard Miles

Personal details
- Born: November 15, 1811 La Salvetat, Languedoc-Roussillon, France
- Died: June 28, 1877 (aged 65) Saint Mary-of-the-Woods, Indiana, United States

Styles of Jacques-Maurice De Saint Palais
- Reference style: The Right Reverend
- Spoken style: Your Excellency
- Religious style: Bishop
- Posthumous style: none

Jacques-Maurice des Landes d’Aussac de Saint Palais (November 15, 1811 – June 28, 1877) was a French-born prelate of the Roman Catholic Church. He served as the fourth bishop of Vincennes in Indiana from 1848 until his death in 1877.

== Biography ==
=== Early life ===
De Saint Palais was born on November 15, 1811, in La Salvetat in France. He was ordained to the priesthood on May 28, 1836, in the Church of Saint-Sulpice, Paris. That same year, de Saint Palais met Bishop Simon Bruté, the first bishop of the new Diocese of Vincennes in the United States. Looking to recruit seminarians and priest to serve in Vincennes, Bruté convinced de Saint Palais to join him. In July 1836, De Saint Palais left France, finally arriving in Chicago, Illinois. Then a small frontier community, Chicago was part of the new diocese.

Over the next 12 years, Chicago grew into a city. De Saint Palais served in several parishes there. After the death of Bishop Jean Bazin in April 1848, de Saint Palais was elected as administrator of the diocese.

=== Bishop of Vincennes ===
De Saint Palais was named bishop of Vincennes on October 3, 1848, by Pope Pius IX. He received his episcopal consecration on January 14, 1849, from Bishop Richard Miles, with Bishops Martin Spalding and Hippolyte Du Pontavice, vicar general of Vincennes, serving as co-consecrators.

De Saint Palais closed the diocesan seminary at St. Gabriel's College and began an orphan asylum called St. Vincent's using the seminary building. He championed the building of a new motherhouse for the Sisters of Providence of Saint Mary-of-the-Woods and was in frequent correspondence with their foundress, Saint Mother Theodore Guerin. In 1849, Guerin established St. Ann's Orphanage in Vincennes.

Around 1850, a large wave of Catholic Irish and German immigrants moved into the diocese. In 1854, monks from Einsiedeln, Switzerland, founded St. Meinrad abbey and seminary in southern Indiana.

During his time in the diocese, the Catholic population grew from about 30,000 to 80,000. In 1857, part of the diocese was split off to form the Diocese of Fort Wayne and made suffragan to Cincinnati.

De Saint Palais had to contend with both a cholera epidemic, and the American Civil War, during which several priests from the diocese served as chaplains. He recognized that Indianapolis had become a major city, but deferred the decision to move the seat of the diocese to his successor.

==== Death ====
De Saint Palais died on June 28, 1877, at St. Mary-of-the-Woods, Indiana, at age 65. He is buried in the crypt of the Old Cathedral in Vincennes.

Catholic Church titles
Preceded by Jean Etienne Bazin	Bishop of Vincennes; 1848–1877	Succeeded by Francis Silas Marean Chatard
