= Vincennes Historic District =

Historic district in Indiana, United States

- U.S. National Register of Historic Places
- U.S. Historic district
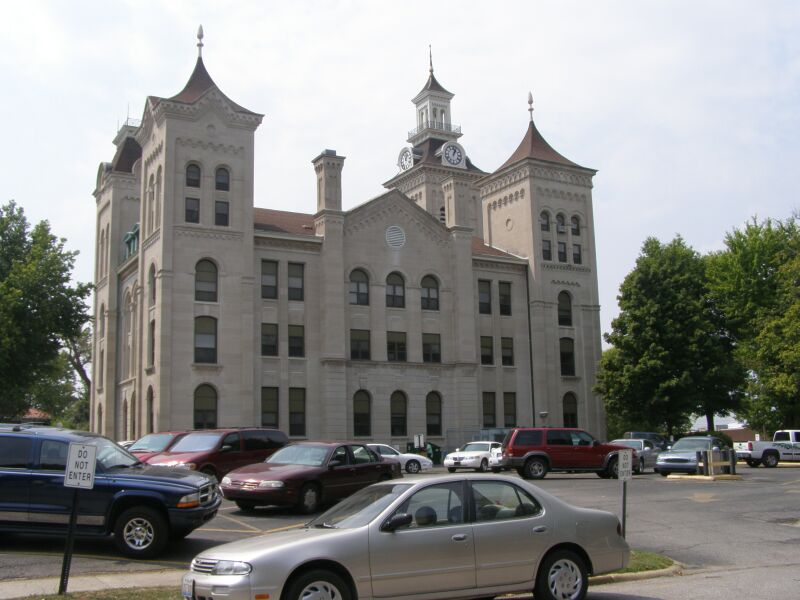
- Knox County Courthouse, August 2007

- Location within Indiana Location within the United States
- Location: Vincennes, Vincennes, Indiana
- Coordinates: 38°40′38″N 87°31′43″W
- Area: 500 acres (200 ha)
- Architect: Multiple
- Architectural style: Mixed (more Than 2 Styles From Different Periods)
- NRHP reference No.: 74000022
- Added to NRHP: December 31, 1974

Vincennes Historic District is a national historic district located at Vincennes, Indiana. The district encompasses 1,161 contributing buildings, five contributing sites, nine contributing structures, and 37 contributing objects in the central business district and surrounding residential sections of Vincennes. It developed between about 1787 and 1955, and includes notable examples of Federal, Greek Revival, Italianate, and Classical Revival style architecture. Located in the district are the separately listed George Rogers Clark National Historical Park, William Henry Harrison Home, Indiana Territorial Capitol, Old State Bank, and St. Francis Xavier Cathedral and Library. Other notable buildings include the Brouillet House (c. 1806), Knox County Courthouse (1873), Ellis Mansion (c. 1830), Lacy House (c. 1840), Dunn House (1840), Summers House (c. 1859–1866), Fyfield House (1860), Grannan House (c. 1870), Cauthorn House (c. 1874), Gimble-Bond Store (1879), and Rabb House (c. 1880–1890).

It was listed on the National Register of Historic Places in 1974.

== Vincennes state historic sites ==
=== The Original Territory Capitol Building ===
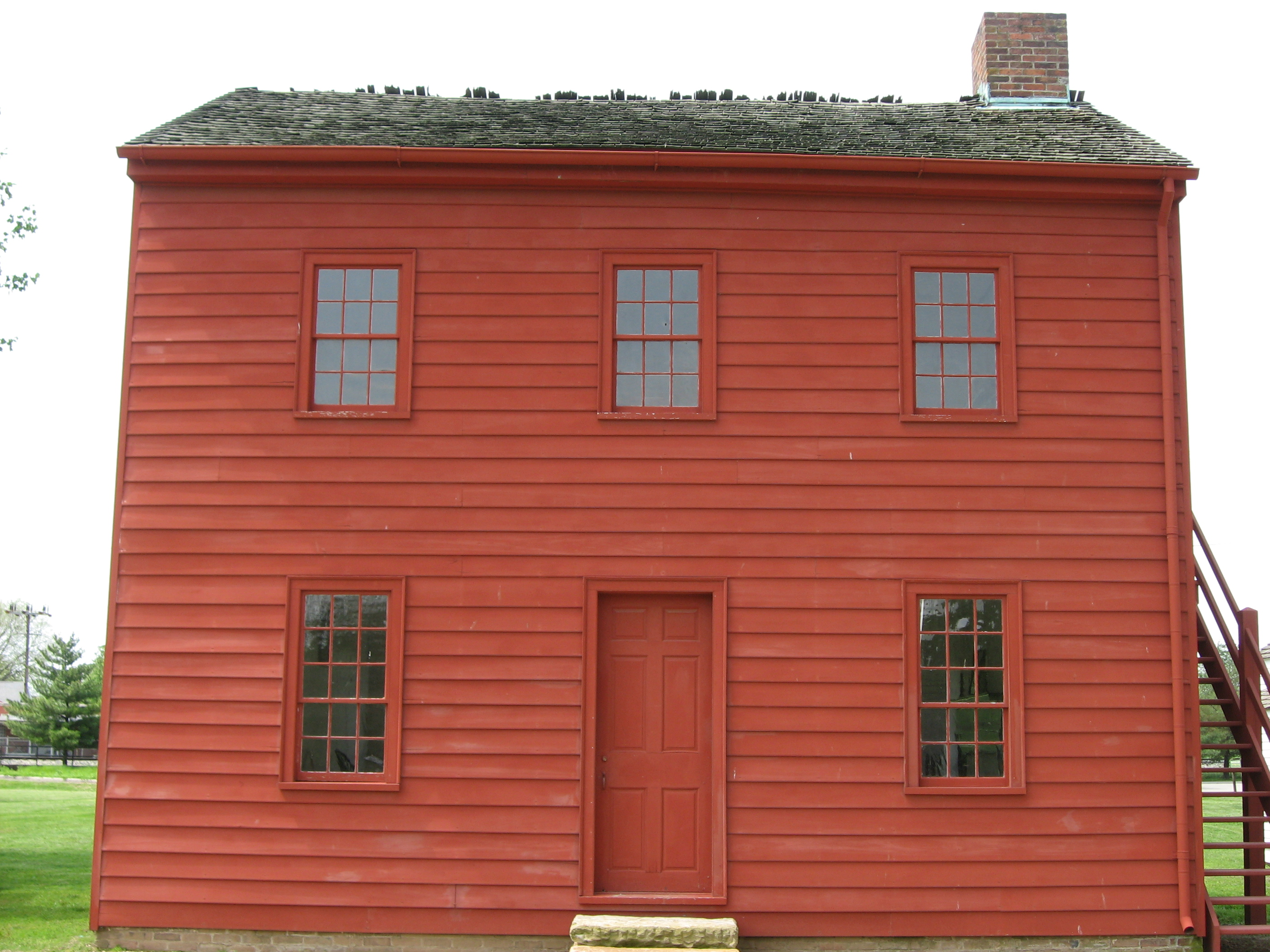
The Original Territory Capitol Building; The "Red House"

Built in 1805 as a tailor shop, the “Red House” is a small two-story building, its heavy timber frame held together with wooden pegs. The “Red House," often considered the oldest major government building in the Midwest, was one of three buildings rented by the legislature from 1805 to 1813 and was the meeting place of the legislature in 1811, after the Battle of Tippecanoe. In addition to serving as the capitol of the Indiana Territory, Vincennes also served as the capital of the Louisiana Purchase for nine months in 1804 - that means that for a brief time more land was governed out of Vincennes than any other capitol except for Washington, D.C. In 1813, the territorial government moved to Corydon, which became Indiana's first state capital when Indiana became a state in 1816. After the government moved, the "Red House" passes through a number of owners and purposes as a saddle-maker's shop, a tinsmith's shop, a tailor's shop, and a boarding house. In 1919 the building was purchased by the Women's Fortnightly Club and moved to a location in Harrison Park, to be used as a museum. It was moved again in 1947 to what became known as the Vincennes State Historic Site which includes several other historic structures. Throughout its lifetime, the "Red House" was repainted several times in colors other than red but was referred to in many documents from the early 1800s as "The Red House," a fact confirmed by an early 21st century restoration that found traces of the original red color. Since then, the house has been painted red to reflect to its origins.

=== The French House ===
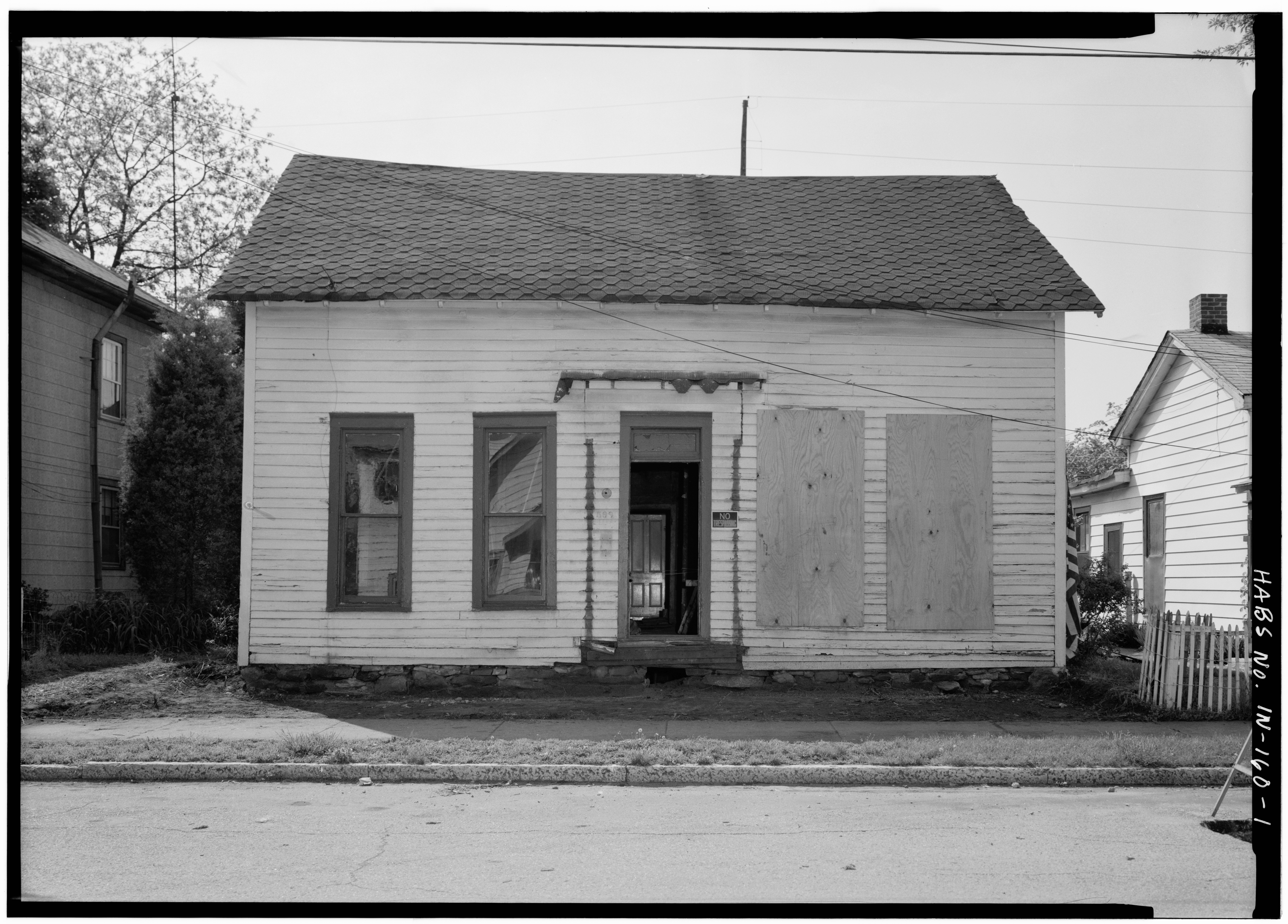
The French House, before restoration c.1974

The French House, also referred to as the Michel Brouillet House, stands in Vincennes as the most intact early nineteenth century French Creole style house in Indiana built circa 1809. It was the home of Michel Brouillet who was born in Vincennes in 1774 and spent most of his life working as middle class “jack of all trades” as a fur-trader and interpreter, fully engaged in economic activities with Native American partners. Brouillet also served as a scout and messenger between Vincennes and Fort Harrison during the War of 1812.The house was constructed in the French colonial tradition called poteaux-sur-sole, or vertical “posts on sill.” Unlike the American log cabin with horizontal logs, the French style uses upright posts fitted into a horizontal sill beam. When the house was purchased Old Northwest Bicentennial Corporation (ONBC) in 1975, there were elements missing from the French House that were fundamental to this style of architecture, primarily two key missing pieces were the porches and lean-to. Archaeological excavations and research throughout the late 1970s and early 1980s revealed evidence of these elements and other landscape features such as outbuildings and picket fences having indeed previously existed. The evidence revealed in these excavations help tell the story of the house and interpret the extensive history of Vincennes. The French House has since been restored to look as it did in its prime, including the reincorporation of the front and back porches and lean-to. In 2015, the Indiana State Museum and Historic Sites (ISMHS) acquired the property from the ONBC, and it is now a part of the Indiana State Museum, Vincennes State Historic Site.

=== Jefferson Academy ===
The Jefferson Academy, the predecessor of Vincennes University, tells the story of early public education as the first school of higher learning in Indiana and as one of the oldest institutions of higher education in the United States. Founded in 1801 by Territorial Governor Harrison, the one room Academy taught Latin, French, and geometry by Catholic priests who acted as teachers for the Academy. Just a few years later, in 1806, the Jefferson Academy became Vincennes University.

=== Elihu Stout Print Shop ===
The Print Shop of Elihu Stout is next door to the territorial capitol in Vincennes. In 1804, Governor William Henry Harrison brought Elihu Stout to Vincennes to print the laws enacted by the legislator of the Indiana territory. Previously, Stout had been a journeyman printer with the Kentucky Gazette in Lexington. In July 1804, Stout established the Indiana Gazette, the first newspaper in Indiana, which ran for 41 years. Elihu Stout's Print Shop represents the power of communication in westward expansion; as the country expanded westward, the distribution of information was crucial to the formation of states. The Elihu Stout Print Shop building in present-day Vincennes is a replica of Stout's first print shop, but the wooden printing press displayed is an original Adam Ramage Printing Press, the same type used by Stout. In 1806, Stout's original print shop burned down, destroying the building and his press, though it did not take long for Stout to acquire the funding to get the newspaper up and running again, as in July 1807 papers were once again being churned out and distributed to subscribers.

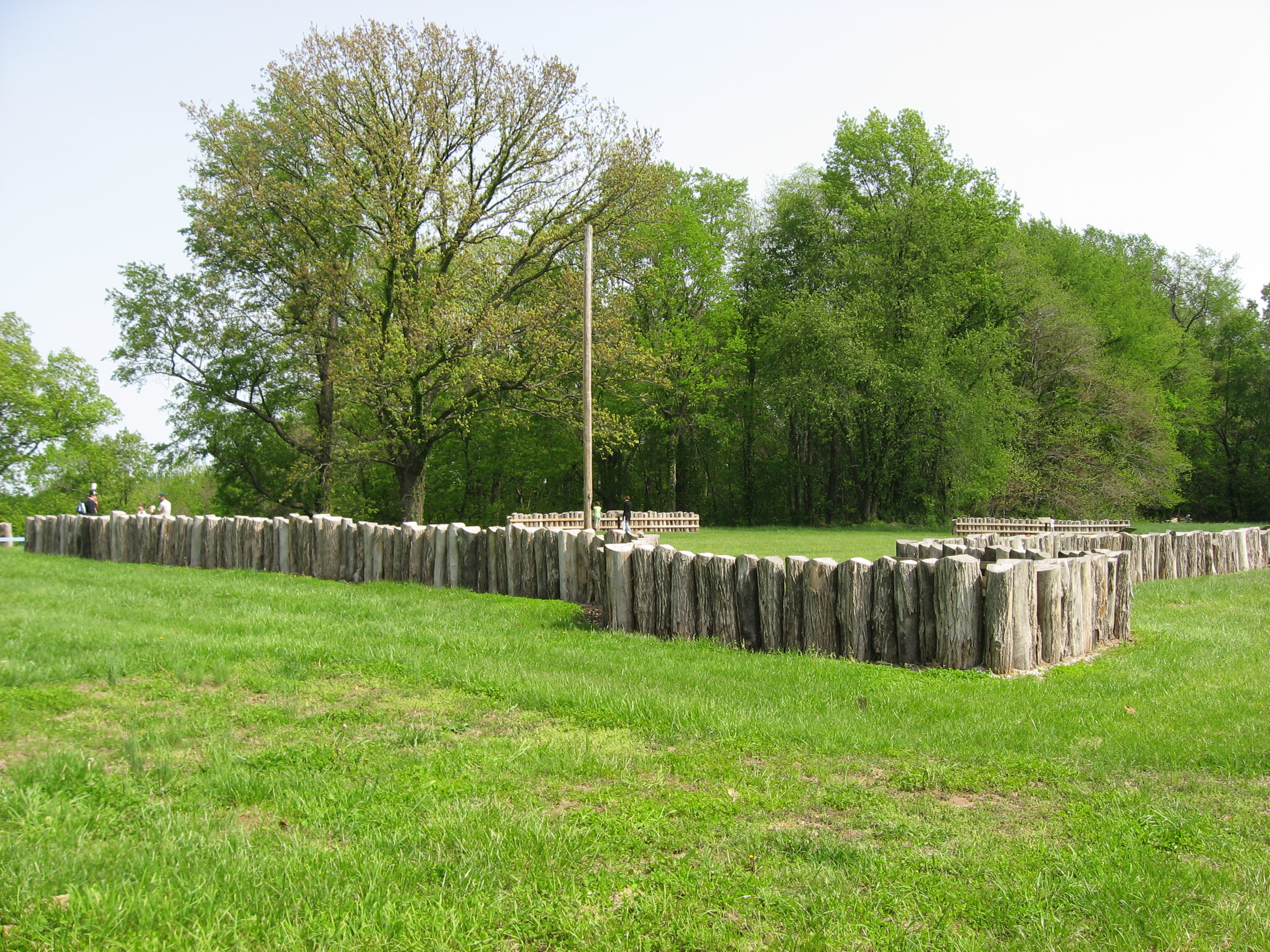
Fort Knox II

=== Fort Knox II ===
Fort Knox II was one if the earliest military posts built and garrisoned in the Indiana territory and was an important outpost used by the United States Army from 1803 to 1813. The fort served as the staging area for the troops and on November 7, 1811, Governor William Henry Harrison gathered his army at Fort Knox II and marched up the Wabash River to the Battle of Tippecanoe at Prophetstown (near present-day Lafayette, Ind.). The fort is outlined with short posts and interpretive markers tell the story of the site. Fort Knox II site is listed and preserved as a state and national historic site and was added to the National Register of Historic Places in 1982.

=== Sugar Loaf Mound ===
Sugar Load Mound is a natural feature that Late Woodland Indians used as a burial mound around 900 A.D. With a sixteen by twenty five foot platform area Sugar Loaf holds a broad view over Vincennes. Travelers heading to Vincennes along the Buffalo Trace from Louisville used it as a landmark, it also served as a marker along the Underground Railroad for slaves seeking freedom in the North.

=== The Old State Bank ===
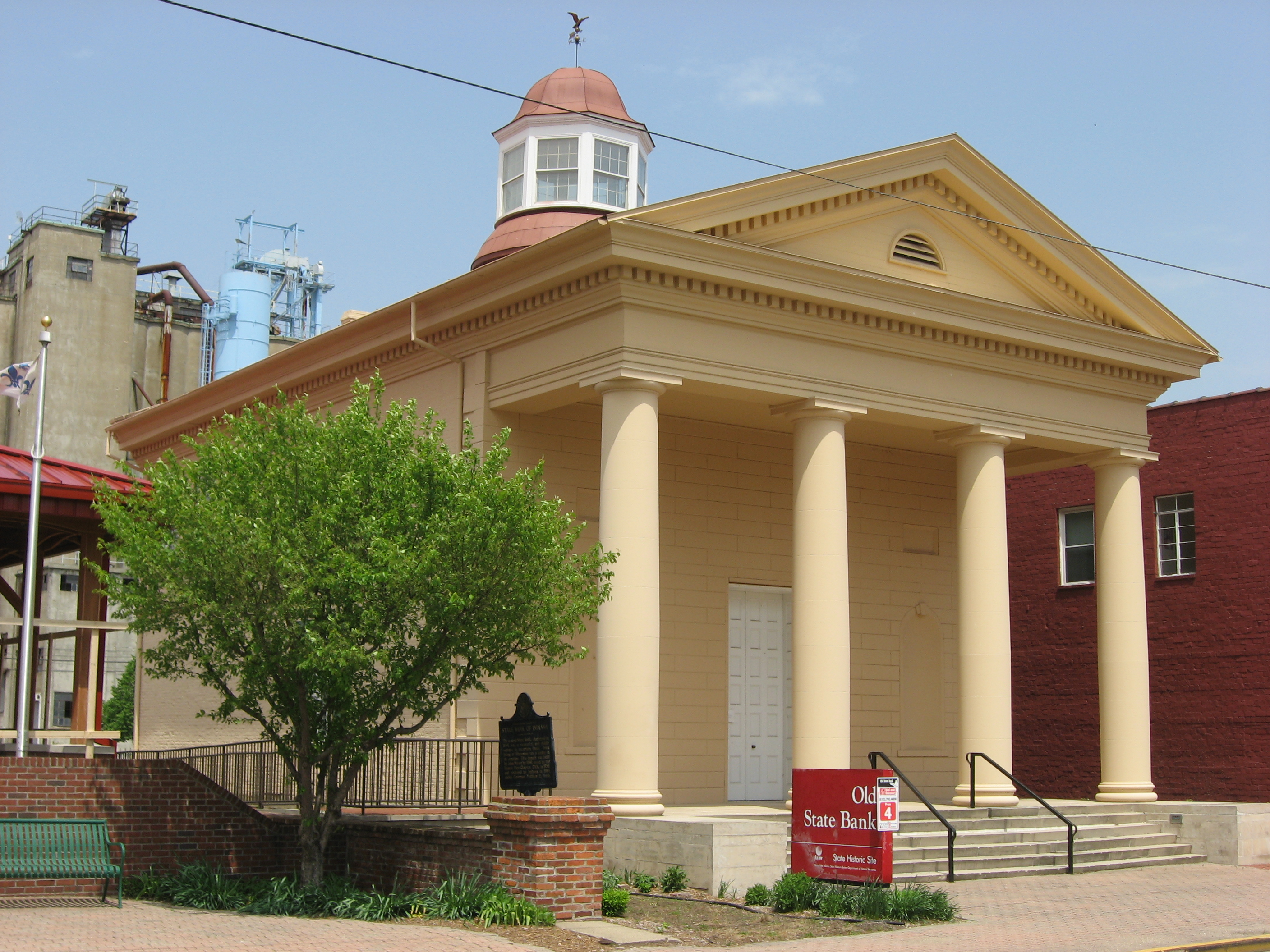
Old State Bank

The Old State Bank is the oldest existing bank structure in Indiana. On Feb. 13, 1834, the Indiana General Assembly chartered the Second State Bank of Indiana, with headquarters in Indianapolis and 12 branches across the state. Construction of the bank in Vincennes began in July 1838. The bank moved into this building upon its completion in November 1838 having been previously located in a rented space on First Street between Main and Vigo Streets. The bank's facade is an imitation of the front of a Greek temple; this distinctive design known as the Greek Revival Style. The style is carried over into the main room of the bank where six fluted columns, more than 30 feet tall, support a bell-shaped cupola that admitted light into the main room. Given the proximity to the Wabash River, Vincennes was a strong fur-trading location early in Indiana's history and the bank's charter allowed it to take furs and produce in exchange for cash. The Old State Bank helped transform Indiana from a fur-trade to agricultural economy and was a key establishment in settling the Midwest.
