= Mary Theodosia Mug =

Roman Catholic nun and author

Mary Theodosia Helen Mug S. P.
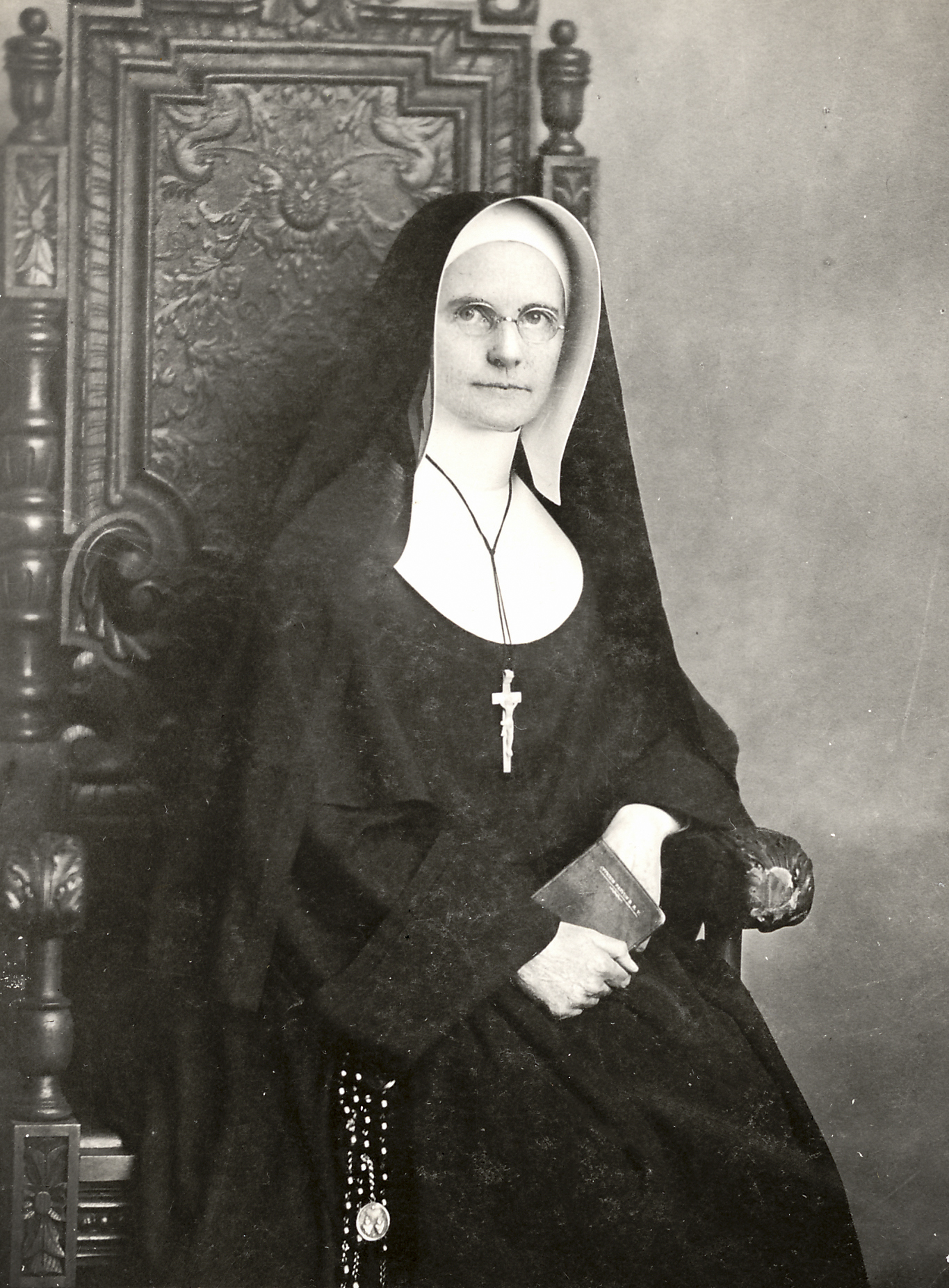

Personal life
- Born: Helen Mary Mug; 1860 Attica, Fountain County, Indiana
- Died: March 23, 1943 (aged 82) St. Mary-of-the-Woods, Vigo County, Indiana

Religious life
- Religion: Catholic

Mary Theodosia Mug (1860–1943) was an author, poet, composer, and the biographer of Saint Mother Théodore Guérin. After almost 90 years of controversy, Sister Mug's miraculous healing from cancer was finally accepted in 2006 by the Holy See as Guérin's first miracle for sainthood. Sister Mug published books and also composed music under the pseudonym H. Maery or Helen Maery, although she did occasionally use her religious name.

== Early life and education ==
She was born Helen Mary Mug in Attica, Indiana to Ellen Phillips Mug and John Mug. Her mother was a student at St. Mary-of-the-Woods College in the 1850s, and she knew Mother Guérin, who had personally prepared her for her first communion. Ellen was still a student when Mother Guérin died in 1856. For primary and high school daughter Helen Mary Mug was educated at St. Ignatius Academy in Lafayette (today St. Ignatius School), and then she enrolled at St. Mary-of-the-Woods College, where she graduated in 1877. She entered the Sisters of Providence of Saint Mary-of-the-Woods congregation the following January, professing her perpetual vows on August 15, 1891, and taking her religious name of Sister Mary Theodosia Helen Mug.

== Illness and miraculous healing ==
Sr. Mug suffered from neuritis, a more painful form of neuropathy, that inhibited her ability to carry out her teaching duties at St. Mary-of-the-Woods college. The congregation sent her for mineral baths and cures, but eventually she developed a tumor in her breast.

She became part of Mother Guérin's canonization process when her healing from cancer was declared a miracle and attributed to the saint. On October 30, 1908, sister Mug prayed at the Saint-Mary-of-the-Woods motherhouse, kneeling before Guérin's crypt in the Church of the Immaculate Conception. She didn't pray for herself (although she could have, given her health), but for another sister, Joseph Therese O'Connell, who was also ill. "While standing there," she wrote to Mother Mary Cleophas, "the thought came into my mind, 'I wonder if she has any power with Almighty God.' Instantly I heard in my soul the words, 'Yes, she has.'"

Before her prayers at Mother Guérin's tomb, Sister Mug's condition had deteriorated considerably, with fainting and vomiting. She had suffered nerve damage following a mastectomy for breast cancer at the hospital in Terre Haute, and she had pain in both arms and her right hand, which were difficult to use. The cancer had also spread to her abdomen, and Dr. Willien, her physician, did not want to disturb it for fear she would die. However, the morning after praying, the lump in her abdomen disappeared, and she could move her arms and hand comfortably.

Mother Guérin's cause for canonization was opened in Rome the following year, in 1909, and it was formally submitted to the Congregation of Rites in 1914. A postulator from that process had dismissed Sister Mug's healing, saying it wasn't a miracle. Father Andrea Ambrosi became Mother Guérin's postulator in 2006 when she was canonized. Ambrosi decided the earlier dismissal was wrong, and accepted the miracle.

== Writing and selected works ==
Sister Mary Theodosia befriended older Sisters of Providence who remembered Mother Guérin well, and who would also have known her own mother when she was a student. According to Penny Blaker Mitchell, whose work was published by the sisters, she learned from Sister Basilide, Sister Mary Joseph, Olympiade, Sister Mary Xavier, and Mother Mary Cecilia. This knowledge made her a natural choice to do the writing when Silas Chatard, Bishop of Indianapolis, asked the congregation for a book about Mother Guérin. She wrote the book by hand in pencil, with a desk adjusted to knee height to accommodate the persistent pain in her arm.

Sister Mug published a life of Mother Guérin anonymously, as obedience and humility required, but it eventually became widely known as hers; she published subsequent work either under her name or under the pseudonym Helen Maery. With the Library of Congress for copyright purposes she often included her birth name, Helen Mary Mug.

- 1904. The Life and Life-Work of Mother Théodore Guérin, Foundress of the Sisters of Providence at St.-Mary-of-the-Woods, a biography of Mother Guérin. Written anonymously as "A Member of the Congregation."
- 1912. Eucharistic Lilies: Youthful Lovers of Jesus in the Blessed Sacrament Written pseudonymously as Helen Maery.
- 1918. Hymn to Our Lady, Patroness of the United States, piano/vocal sheet music, written as H. Meary, words by Rev. William P. Treacy.
- 1925. Thoughts for You and Me, poetry by Sister Mary Viola Burke, Sister Mary Teresita Frawley, Sister Loretta Therese Bierman, Sister Mary Borromeo Brown, Sister Francis Cecile Miller, and Sister Mary Theodosia Mug.
- 1925. Hymn to the Little Flower: St. Teresa of the Child Jesus, piano/vocal sheet music published by The Little Flower Publishing Company, St. Mary-of-the-Woods, Indiana, as H. Meary.
- 1931. Lest We Forget: The Sisters of Providence of Saint Mary-of-the-Woods in Civil War Service, booklet about how the City Hospital of Indianapolis became a Military Hospital during the Civil War.
- 1942. Journals and Letters of Mother Theodore Guérin, Foundress of the Sisters of Providence of Saint Mary-of-the Woods, as Sister Mary Theodosia Mug, editor.
