= Frederick Chatard =

American naval officer (1807–1897)

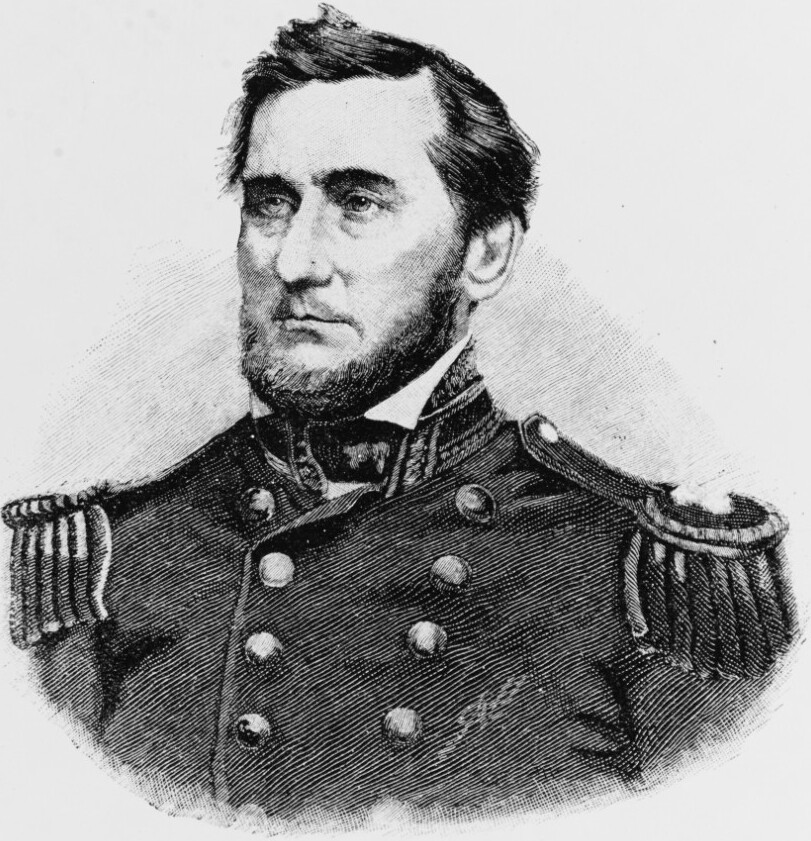
- Chatard, c. 1860s
- Born: 1807; Baltimore, Maryland, U.S.
- Died: October 3, 1897 (aged 89–90); St. Louis, Missouri, U.S.
- Spouse(s): Catherine Josephine Tiernan (m. 1831; died 1840) Eliza McNally (died 1895)
- Children: 6
- Relatives: Silas Chatard (nephew)
- Military career
- Allegiance: United States of America; Confederate States of America
- Branch: United States Navy; Confederate States Navy
- Service years: 1824–1861; 1861–1865
- Rank: Commander
- Commands: USS Independence (1814); USS Lexington (1825); USS Fredonia; USS Saratoga (1842); USS Pennsylvania (1837)
- Conflicts: Mexican–American War; Pacific Coast campaign; Capture of Mazatlán; American Civil War; Battle of Drewry's Bluff; Battle of Aquia Creek

Frederick Chatard (1807 – October 3, 1897) was an American naval officer. He served in the United States Navy from 1824 to 1861, serving in the Mexican–American War and advancing to the rank of commander. He then served as commander in the Confederate States Navy throughout the Civil War, from 1861 to 1865.

== Early life ==
Frederick Chatard was born at the family home on Saratoga Street in Baltimore, Maryland, in 1807 to Dr. Pierre Chatard. His paternal grandfather was a rich planter in Martinique and his father moved from Martinique to Baltimore in 1797. Chatard attended private schools in Baltimore. The family's house burned down in the Clay Street Fire of 1872.

== Career ==
At the age of 17, on November 16, 1824, Chatard was appointed as a midshipman of the United States Navy on the USS North Carolina (1820). He was promoted to lieutenant on March 29, 1834. By 1836, he was on the schooner USS Grampus (1821) and by May 1837, he was on the USS Vandalia (1828). In January 1843, he joined the USS Columbus (1819). In November 1847, during the Mexican–American War, he was in command of the USS Independence (1814) during the capture of Mazatlán. During the Pacific Coast campaign, he used riverine warfare tactics he learned from Levin M. Powell while serving under him in the Vandalia. On January 12, 1848, with the Independence and a bark Whiton, he spiked guns at the Castillo de la Entrade in San Blas and cut out two schooners. On January 17, with the bark Whiton, he spiked three guns at the presidio at Manzanillo. In the fall of 1849, he was lieutenant commander of the USS Lexington (1825) and witnessed the California gold rush during his time on the ship. In 1852, he took command of the store ship USS Fredonia. He was promoted to commander on September 14, 1855. In May 1857, he succeeded Edward G. Tilton as commander of the USS Saratoga (1842). In the winter of 1857, he failed to apprehend William Walker and a group of filibusters at his station in Punta Arenas. He served in the Navy until the outbreak of the American Civil War. In January 1861, he left service of the receiving ship USS Pennsylvania (1837). He resigned on April 24, 1861.

== Civil War ==
Chatard joined the Confederate States Navy on June 15, 1861. In September 1861, he was directed to erect batteries at Evansport, Virginia, by General Holmes. He erected batteries along with Captain William F. Lynch on the Potomac River. He was in charge of the heavy batteries at Manassas Junction, Virginia, prior and after the First Battle of Bull Run. He was also in charge of the batteries at Gloucester Point on the York River. He was later put in charge of the marine battery at Drewry's Bluff. He participated in the Battle of Drewry's Bluff on the James River, on the Potomac River near Evansport, Virginia, and the Battle of Aquia Creek. He remained at Drewry's Bluff until it was abandoned on April 2, 1865. Following the end of the war, he returned to Baltimore.

== Later life ==
Chatard moved to St. Louis in 1866. He was pardoned by President Andrew Johnson in January 1867. He was associated with the Life Association of America. He retired from business in the mid-1870s.

== Personal life ==
Chatard married Catherine Josephine Tiernan, daughter of Luke Tiernan and sister of Charles Tiernan, on October 13, 1831. She died in 1840. He later married Eliza McNally, daughter of Michael R. McNally. His wife died in 1895. He had two sons and four daughters, including Luke Tiernan, Mrs. Robbins, Mrs. A. A. Janis, Charlotte, and Kate. Bishop Silas Chatard was his nephew.

Chatard died on October 3, 1897, at Mullanphy Hospital in St. Louis.
