= La Salvetat-sur-Agout =

- Commune
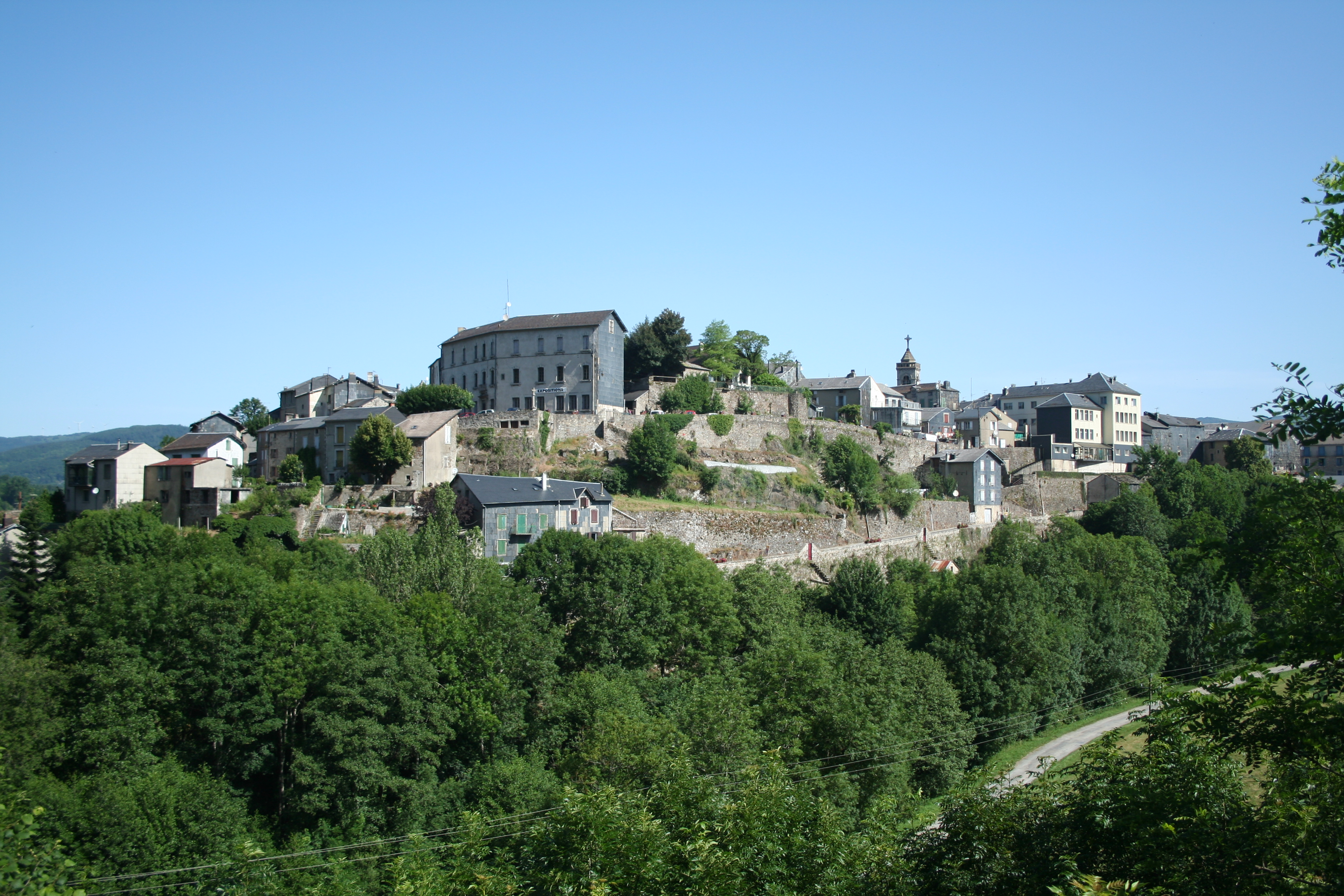
- A general view of La Salvetat-sur-Agout

- Coat of arms
- Location of La Salvetat-sur-Agout
- Location within France Location within Occitanie
- Coordinates: 43°36′06″N 2°42′14″E
- Country: France
- Region: Occitania
- Department: Hérault
- Arrondissement: Béziers
- Canton: Saint-Pons-de-Thomières
- Intercommunality: CC du Haut-Languedoc

Government
  - Mayor (2020–2026): Francis Cros
- Area^{1}: 87.55 km^{2} (33.80 sq mi)
- Elevation: 700 m (2,300 ft)
- Highest elevation: 1,087 m (3,566 ft)
- Lowest elevation: 663 m (2,175 ft)
- Population (2023): 1,108
  - Density: 12.66/km^{2} (32.78/sq mi)
- Time zone: UTC+01:00 (CET)
  - Summer (DST): UTC+02:00 (CEST)
- INSEE/Postal code: 34293 /34330
- ^{1} French Land Register data, which excludes lakes, ponds, glaciers > 1 km^{2} (0.386 sq mi or 247 acres) and river estuaries.

La Salvetat-sur-Agout (French pronunciation: [la salvəta syʁ aɡu(t)], lit. 'La Salvetat on Agout'; Occitan: La Salvetat) is a commune in the Hérault department in the Occitanie region in southern France.

== Population ==
Historical population
Year	Pop.	±% p.a.
1968	1,361	—
1975	1,115	−2.81%
1982	1,174	+0.74%
1990	1,153	−0.23%
1999	1,118	−0.34%
2007	1,204	+0.93%
2012	1,112	−1.58%
2017	1,141	+0.52%
2023	1,108	−0.49%
Source: INSEE

== See also ==
- Communes of the Hérault department
