= Indiana Territorial Capitol =

- Territorial Capitol of Former Indiana Territory
- U.S. National Register of Historic Places
- U.S. Historic district – Contributing property
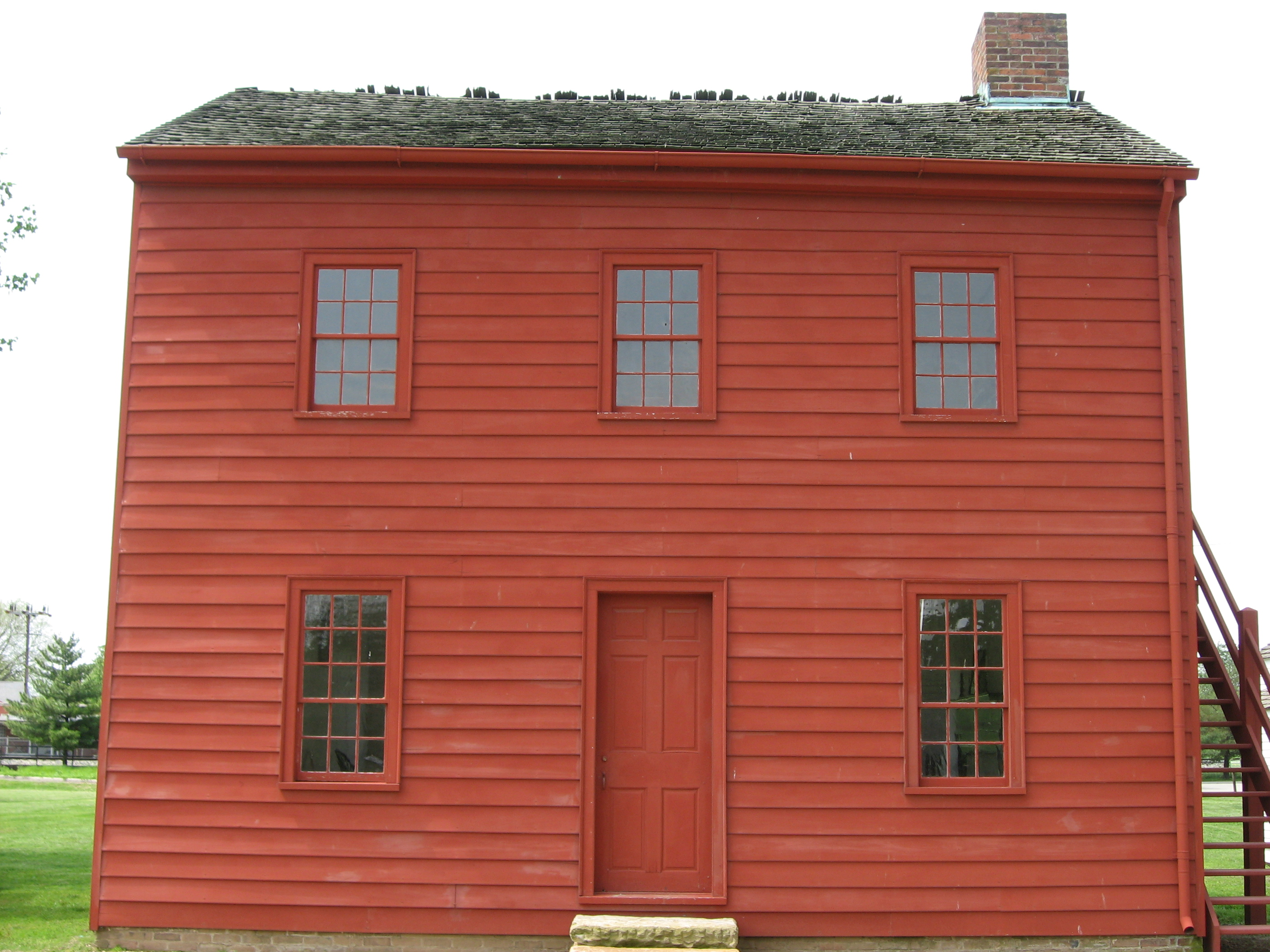
- Front of the old capitol

- Location within Indiana Location within the United States
- Location: Bounded by Harrison, 1st, Scott, and Park Sts., Vincennes, Indiana
- Coordinates: 38°41′6″N 87°31′31″W
- Area: 0.1 acres (0.040 ha)
- Built: 1800-1805
- NRHP reference No.: 73000021
- Added to NRHP: July 2, 1973

The Indiana Territorial Capitol, also known as the Indiana Territory State Memorial and Legislative Hall, is part of a state historical site in Vincennes, Indiana. Part of a row of buildings located across from Vincennes University, the building was the center of government for the Indiana Territory from 1800 to 1813. It was built between 1800 and 1805, and is a simple two-story frame building. It was moved to its present site in 1949.

The building was added to the National Register of Historic Places in 1973. It is located in the Vincennes Historic District.

== See also ==
- List of the oldest buildings in Indiana
