= Célestin Guynemer de la Hailandière =

French-born bishop in the United States

- Bishop of Vincennes (1839–1847)
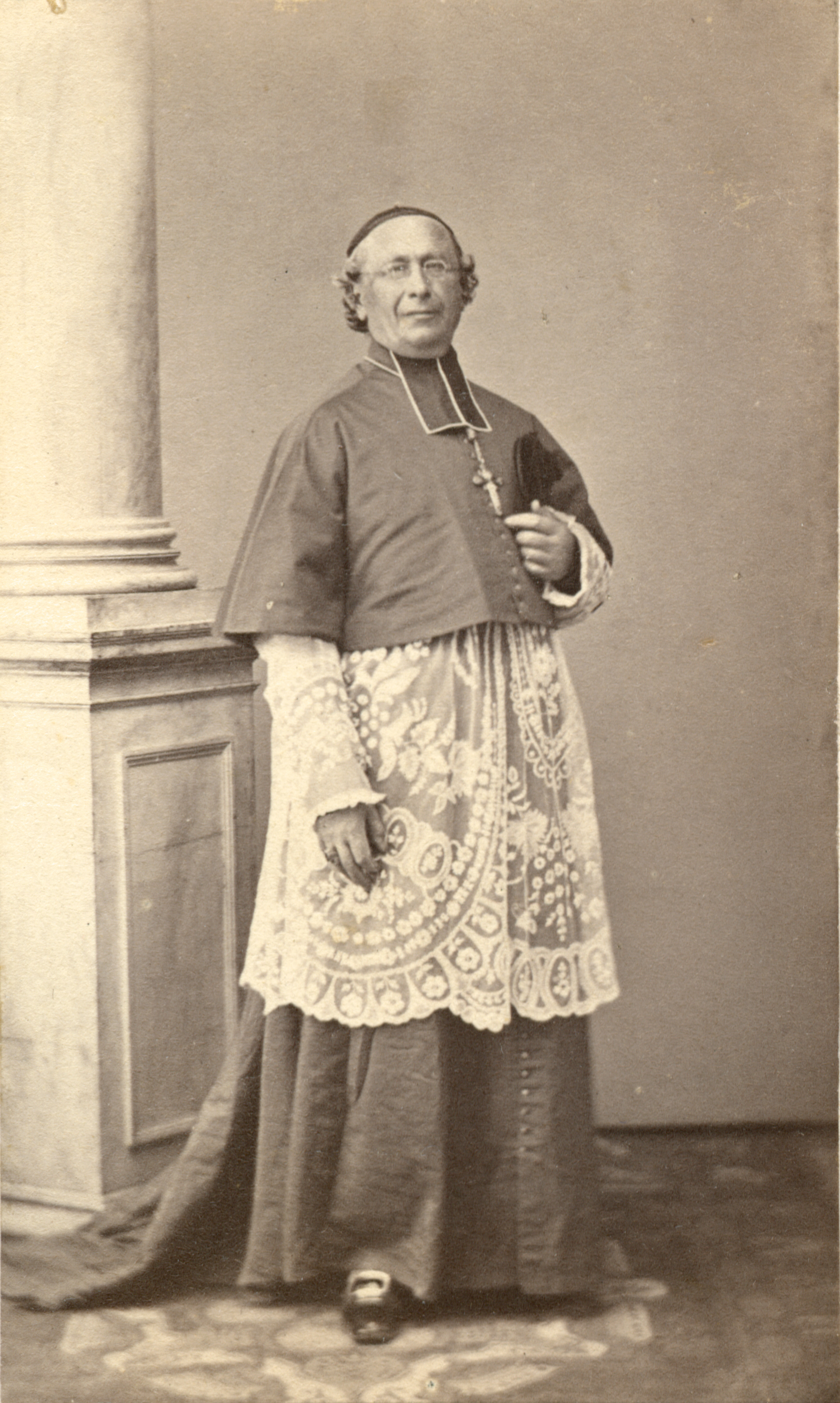

Orders
- Ordination: May 28, 1825
- Consecration: August 18, 1839 by Charles Forbin-Janson

Personal details
- Born: May 3, 1798 Combourg, France
- Died: May 1, 1882 (aged 83)
- Buried: Vincennes, Indiana

Styles of Célestin Guynemer de la Hailandière
- Reference style: The Right Reverend
- Spoken style: Your Excellency
- Religious style: Bishop
- Posthumous style: none

Célestin René Laurent Guynemer de la Hailandière (May 3, 1798 – May 1, 1882) was a French prelate of the Roman Catholic Church. He served as Bishop of Vincennes (now the Archdiocese of Indianapolis) from 1839 to 1847. He is perhaps best known for donating the land for the establishment of the University of Notre Dame.

== Biography ==
=== Early life ===
La Hailandière was born May 3, 1798, in Combourg during the time of the French Revolution. He was baptized the same day by a priest sheltered in hiding in his father's house. The family later moved to Rennes, where La Hailandière began his classical studies. At the age of nineteen he took up the study of law, and was admitted to the bar. In 1822, after attending a mission, he decided to become a priest. Counseling against making a rash decision, his father encouraged him not to give up the law, and through an acquaintance with Jacques-Joseph Corbière had young Célestin appointed judge of the civil tribunal of Redon at the age of twenty-four.

After a brief time as judge, he resigned the position and in October 1822 entered the seminary at Rennes. From there he went to the Seminary of Saint-Sulpice in Paris. Apart from his studies, he was assigned to teach catechism under the direction of Félix Dupanloup, later Bishop of Orleans. Célestin was ordained a priest on May 28, 1825, in Paris and assigned as curate of the parish of St. Germain in Rennes. In 1836 Simon Bruté de Rémur, Bishop of Vincennes came to Rennes looking for an assistant who could serve as his vicar-general. The Bishop of Rennes recommended the curate of St. Germain, and Célestin left for the United States with Bruté de Rémur.

The diocese, which included the state of Indiana and the eastern part of Illinois, was sparsely populated with only a few small towns and widely scattered farms. The Potawatomi and Miami lived in the northern part of Indiana. There were few Catholics. As La Hailandière knew little English, he was assigned to attend the French Catholics living in and around Vincennes.

=== Bishop ===
On May 17, 1839, La Hailandière was appointed Coadjutor Bishop of Vincennes and Titular Bishop of Axieri by Pope Gregory XVI. At the time, he was the youngest bishop in the United States. Bishop Bruté de Rémur sent La Hailandière as a representative to their native France to raise funds, recruit priests, and invite religious congregations to come to the diocese and teach, provide religious instruction, and assist the sick. The Sisters of Providence of Ruillé-sur-Loir agreed to send some sisters, among whom was Théodore Guérin. Bishop Bruté died on June 26, 1839, while La Hailandière was in France.

La Hailandière succeeded Bishop Bruté de Rémur as the second Bishop of Vincennes on the following June 26, and received his episcopal consecration in the Chapel of the Sacred Heart in Paris on August 18 from Bishop Charles Forbin-Janson, with Bishops Louis Blanquart de Bailleul, Bishop of Versailles, and Jean-Louis-Simon Lemercier of Beauvais serving as co-consecrators. In 1840 Hailandière attended the Fourth Provincial Council in Baltimore.

In 1842, Bishop Hailandière offered land to Father Edouard Sorin of the Congregation of Holy Cross, on condition that he build a college in two years. Fr. Sorin arrived on the site with eight Holy Cross brothers from France and Ireland on November 26, 1842, and began the school using Father Stephen Badin's old log chapel. Thus began the University of Notre Dame.

During his tenure, the eastern third of Illinois, which had hitherto been part of the diocese's territory, was separated from the Diocese of Vincennes upon the establishment of the Diocese of Chicago on November 28, 1843. Whether the Bishop was a perfectionist, not clear in his instructions, or lacked confidence in his subordinates, Hailandière had difficulty delegating work and so had trouble keeping assistants. Hailandière resigned his post on July 16, 1847, his health strained after eight years of service, and then returned to France. He was succeeded by John Stephen Bazin.

== Death ==
Bishop Célestin Guynemer de la Hailandiere died at the family estate at Triandin, near Combourg on May 1, 1882 (two days before his 84th birthday), 35 years after his return to France. At his request, his remains were returned to the United States in November 1882 and were transferred to and buried in the Old Cathedral of Vincennes on November 22, 1882.

== Episcopal succession ==
Catholic Church titles
| Preceded by Simon Bruté de Rémur | Bishop of Vincennes; 1839–1847 | Succeeded by Jean Bazin |
