= John Stephen Bazin =

French bishop (1796–1848)

The Right Reverend John Stephen Bazin
- Bishop of Vincennes
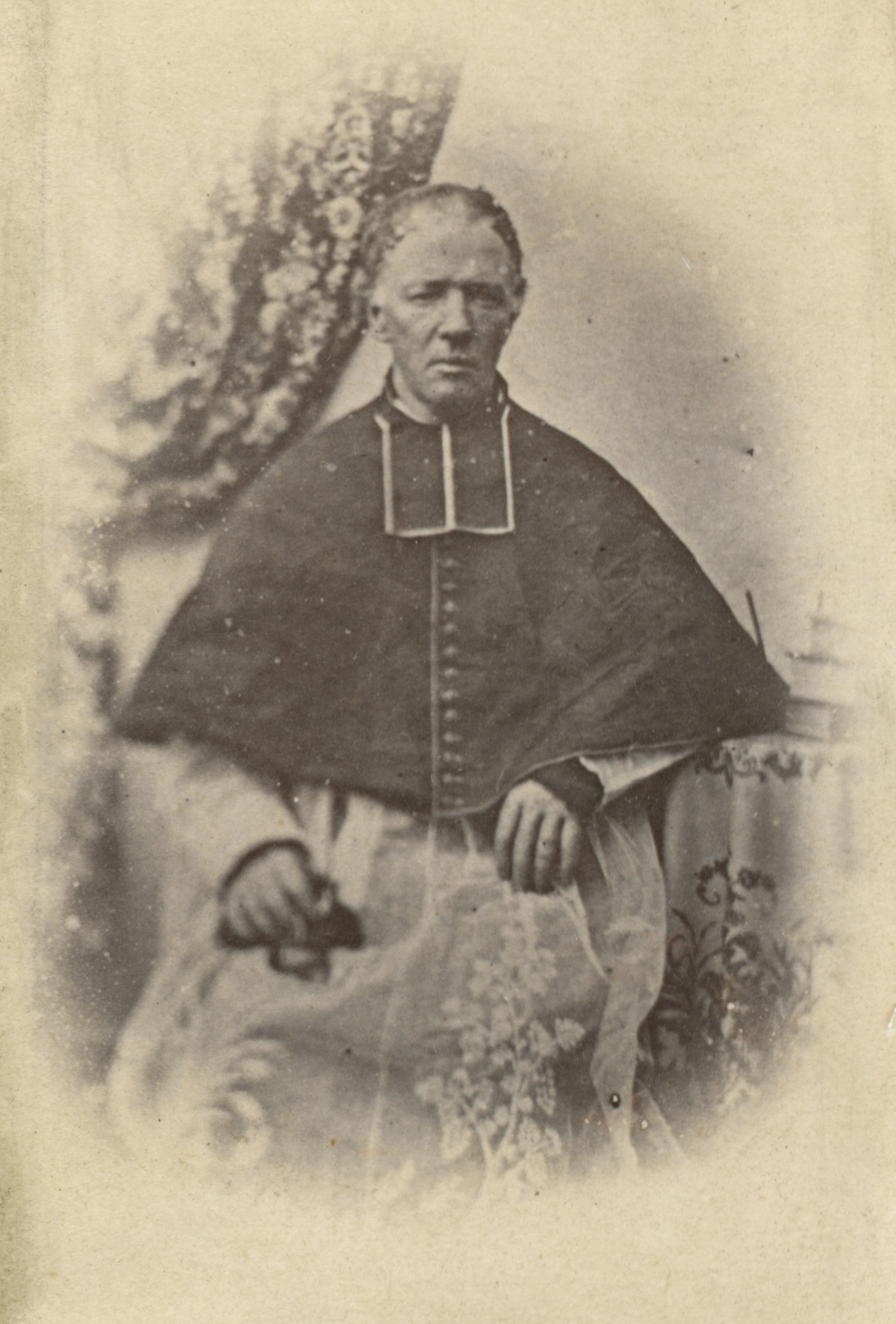
- Native name: Jean Etienne Bazin
- See: Roman Catholic Diocese of Vincennes (Indiana)
- Installed: October 24, 1847
- Term ended: April 23, 1848
- Predecessor: Célestin Guynemer de la Hailandière
- Successor: Jacques-Maurice des Landes d’Aussac De Saint Palais

Orders
- Ordination: July 22, 1822

Personal details
- Born: October 15, 1796 Duerne, France
- Died: April 23, 1848 (aged 51) Vincennes, Indiana
- Denomination: Roman Catholic

John Stephen Bazin (October 15, 1796–April 23, 1848) was the third Roman Catholic Bishop of Vincennes (now the Archdiocese of Indianapolis).

== Life ==
Jean Etienne Bazin was born at Duerne, near Lyon, on October 15, 1796, the fourth of nine children of Jean-Antoine and Claudine (née Ville) Bazin. He was educated in his native country and ordained in Lyon Cathedral on July 22, 1822.

In November 1830, he arrived in the United States and began his labours among the Roman Catholics of Mobile, Alabama, where for seventeen years he worked for the religious instruction of the young, organizing the Sunday schools and establishing the Catholic Orphan Asylum Society. He was also the vicar-general of the diocese.

In 1846 at the request of Bishop Michael Portier, Bazin went to France to secure the services of the Society of Jesus for Spring Hill College of Mobile, Alabama, and of the Brothers of the Christian Schools for the Boys' Orphan Asylum. In both efforts he was successful.

When Célestine Guynemer de la Hailandière, Bishop of Vincennes, resigned his see in 1847, Bazin was consecrated his successor on the 24th of October of that year.

Bazin reassured Theodore Guerin that her congregation, the Sisters of Providence of Saint Mary-of-the-Woods, could continue despite numerous issues they had had with Bishop de la Hailandière, who had banished Guerin from the diocese and threatened excommunication. In a letter to another bishop, Jean-Baptiste Bouvier of Le Mans, Guerin described Bazin as "pious, humble, and of an amiable simplicity."

Bazin died at Vincennes, Indiana on April 23, 1848, only seven months after his consecration as bishop. He and was interred in the Old Cathedral.

Catholic Church titles
Preceded by Mathias Loras	President of Spring Hill College; 1832–1836	Succeeded by Peter Mauvernay
Preceded by Célestine Guynemer de la Hailandière	Bishop of Vincennes; 1847–1848	Succeeded by Jacques-Maurice des Landes d’Aussac De Saint Palais
