= Silas Chatard =

American Catholic prelate

Francis Silas Marean Chatard
- Bishop of Indianapolis (1898–1918)
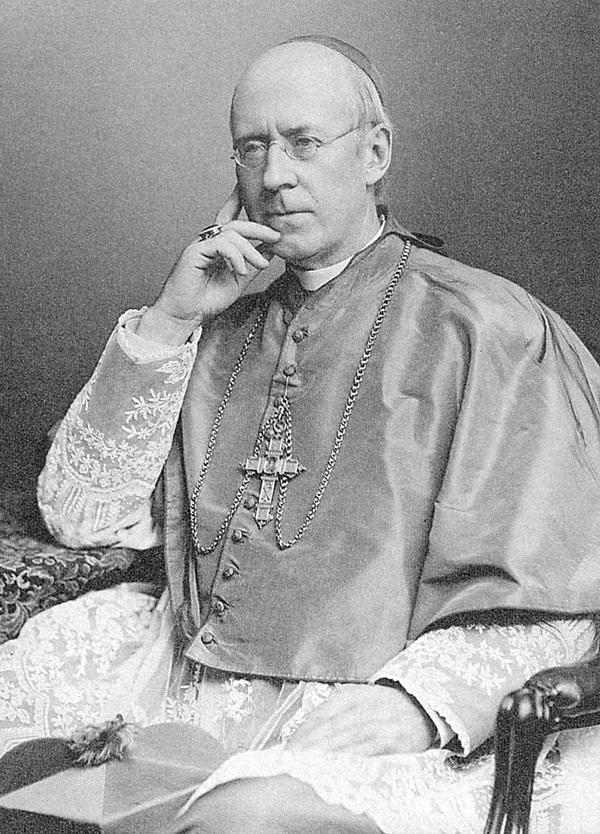
- Other posts: Bishop of Vincennes, Indiana (1878–1898); Rector of the North American College, Rome (1868–1878)

Orders
- Ordination: June 14, 1862 by Costantino Patrizi Naro
- Consecration: May 12, 1878 by Alessandro Cardinal Franchi

Personal details
- Born: December 13, 1834 Baltimore, Maryland
- Died: September 7, 1918 (aged 83) Indianapolis, Indiana

Francis Silas Marean Chatard (December 13, 1834 – September 7, 1918) was an American Catholic prelate who served as Bishop of Indianapolis from 1898 to 1918.

== Life ==
He was born Silas Francis Marean Chatard in Baltimore, Maryland, on December 13, 1834, to Ferdinand E. Chatard and Eliza Marean. Both his father, Ferdinand, and his paternal grandfather, Pierre, an emigrant from Santo Domingo, West Indies, were physicians in Baltimore. His paternal grandmother, Eliza Anna Chatard, was a financial supporter of the Oblate Sisters of Providence. His uncle was Confederate States commander Frederick Chatard.

Raised in a prominent family, he attended Mount Saint Mary's College in Emmitsburg (now Mount Saint Mary's University), and the Maryland University School of Medicine, receiving a doctorate in medicine. He served his residency at the Baltimore Alms House.

Soon afterward, he felt the call to priesthood and in 1857 began studying at the Pontificio Collegio Urbano de Propaganda Fide in Rome. He was ordained on June 14, 1862, and received a Doctor of Divinity degree the next year. Following his ordination, he served as Vice-Rector of the Pontifical North American College in Rome. In 1868, he became Rector of the college. During his time as Rector, the First Vatican Council was held, and was able to meet many American Bishops who stayed at the college while in Rome. Chatard was apparently a favorite of Pope Pius IX.

On March 26, 1878, he was named Bishop of the Diocese of Vincennes, in Indiana. At his consecration in Rome on June 14, 1878, he switched his first and middle name, taking the name of Francis Silas. He was installed in the cathedral at Vincennes on August 11, 1878, and he went almost immediately to Indianapolis, arriving there on August 17, 1878. His predecessor, Bishop St. Palais had recognized that Indianapolis had become a major city, but deferred the decision to move the seat of the diocese to his successor.

Said to be "the most scholarly clergyman in America", in 1883, Chatard was rumored as the new Archbishop of Philadelphia, That appointment never took place for reasons unknown. Chatard did have some impact on the American Church, however. He aligned himself with the more conservative wing of the Church, led by Michael Corrigan of New York and others. The more progressive wing was led by the likes of Cardinal Gibbons and Archbishop Ireland.

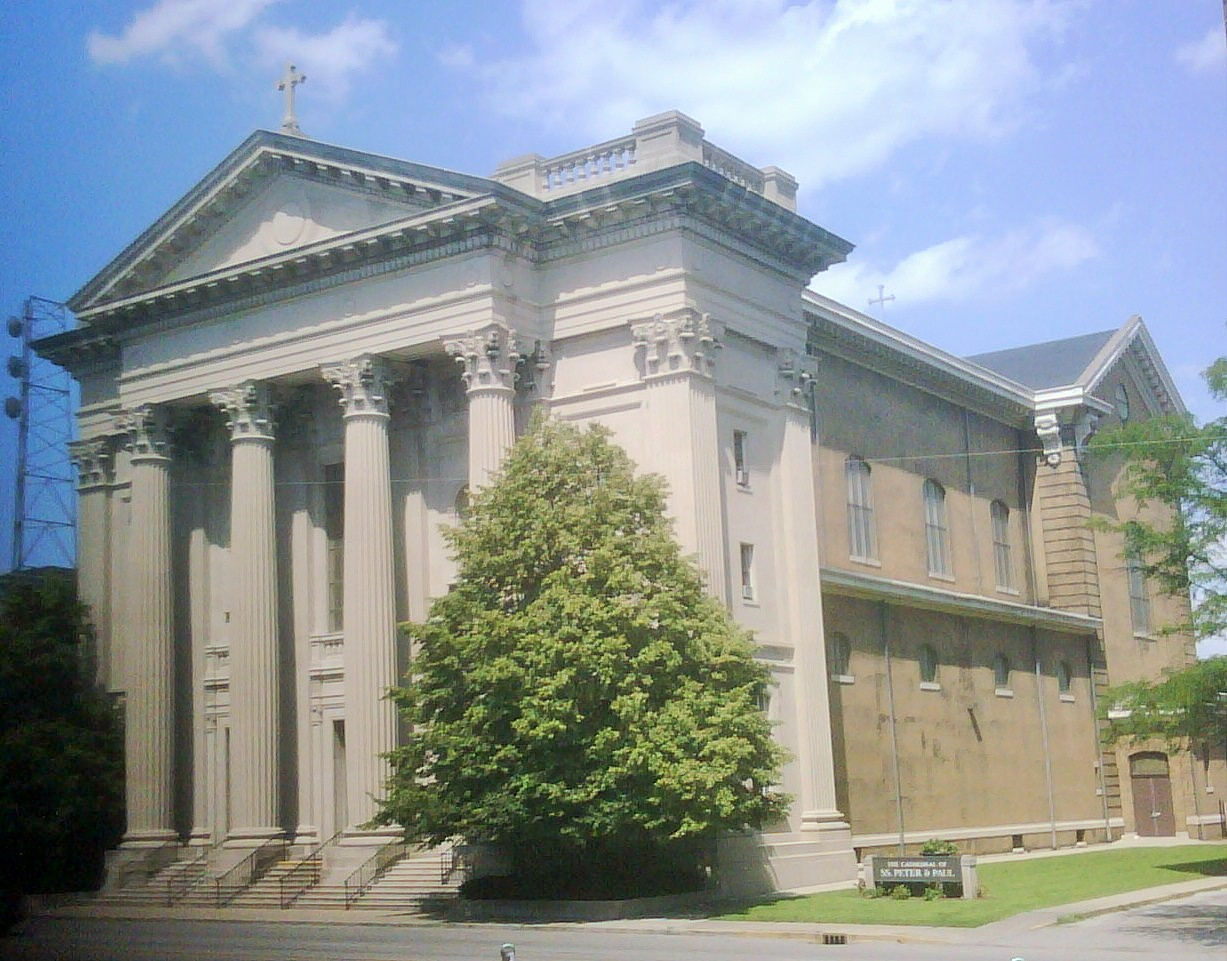
Sts. Peter & Paul Cathedral, Indianapolis

While bishop, he oversaw the movement of the Episcopal see of the diocese of Vincennes to Indianapolis in 1898. He established his see at Saint John the Evangelist Church, which served as the proto-cathedral for the diocese in Indianapolis from 1878 to 1906, when Saints Peter and Paul Cathedral was built. Following the move, he was named as the first bishop of the newly renamed Diocese of Indianapolis. It was he who asked Sister of Providence Mary Theodosia Mug to write a biography of Mother Théodore Guérin. Sister Mug's miraculous healing from cancer also became the first miracle accepted by the Holy See for Mother Guérin's canonization.

In January 1899, he suffered a stroke, from which he never fully recovered. By the time of his death on September 7, 1918, at the age of 83, he had enormously changed the face of the Catholic Church in Indiana. During his tenure the Catholic population of the diocese increased from 80,000 to 130,000. His body was interred in the crypt of the Cathedral of Sts. Peter and Paul in Indianapolis. On June 8, 1976, Bishop Chatard's remains were transferred from the cathedral to the Calvary Cemetery, Chapel Mausoleum, Indianapolis.

The diocese of Indianapolis was split in 1944. The old see city of Vincennes became part of the new diocese of Evansville with Indianapolis being raised to the status of Archdiocese.

In the 1960s, establishment of Bishop Chatard High School began. The high school is located in Indianapolis, Indiana.

Catholic Church titles
Preceded by See established	Bishop of Indianapolis; 1898–1918	Succeeded by Joseph Chartrand
Preceded by Jacques-Maurice De Saint Palais	Bishop of Vincennes; 1878–1898	Succeeded by See suppressed
Academic offices
Preceded by William G. McCloskey	Rector of the Pontifical North American College; 1868–1878	Succeeded by Louis Hostlot
