= St. Francis Xavier Cathedral and Library =

Historic church in Vincennes, Indiana, United States

- Old Cathedral Complex
- U.S. National Register of Historic Places
- U.S. Historic district – Contributing property
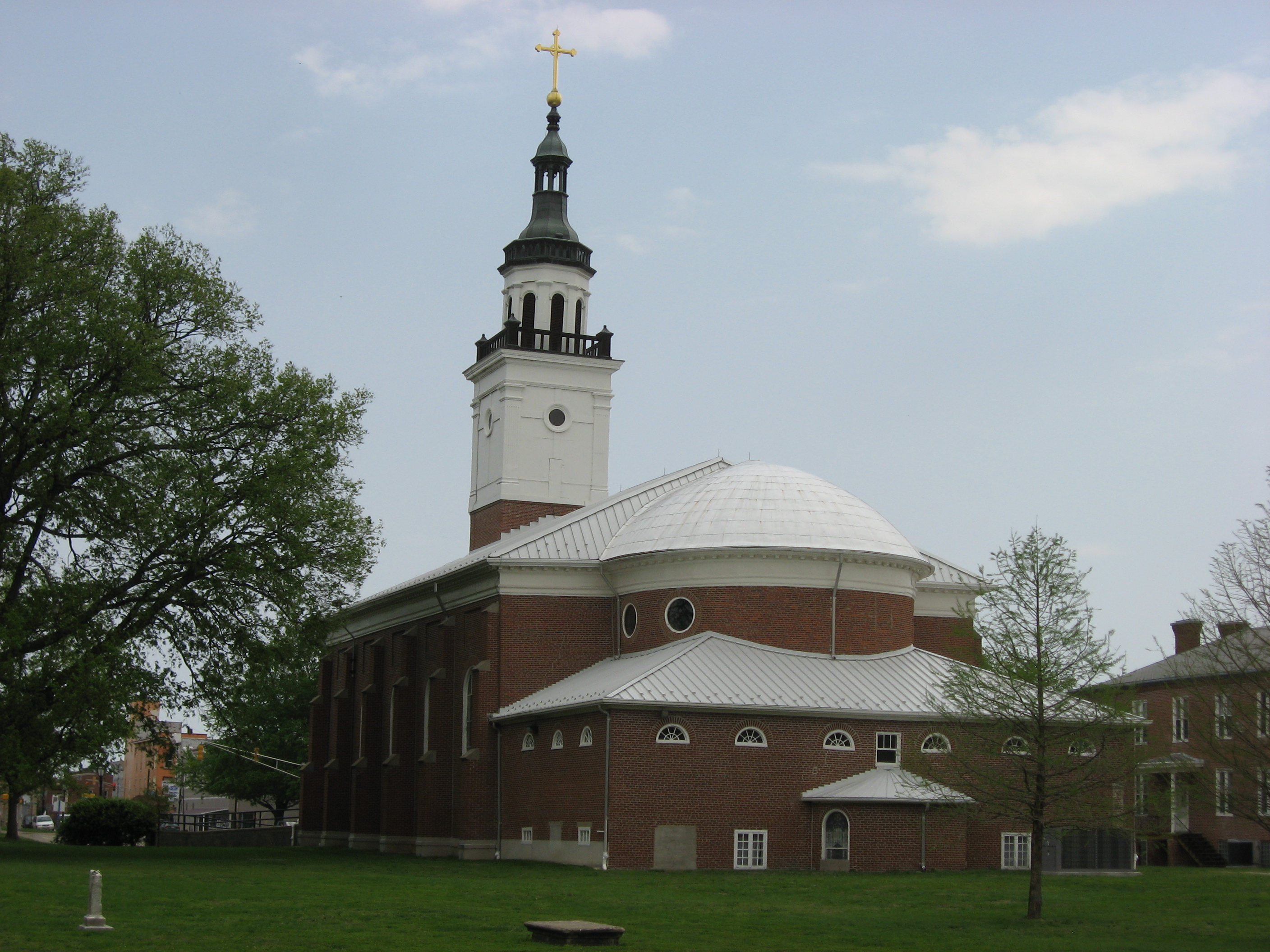
- The cathedral from the rear.

- Location within Indiana Location within the United States
- Location: 205 Church St., Vincennes, Indiana
- Coordinates: 38°40′44″N 87°32′3″W
- Area: 2 acres (0.81 ha)
- Built: 1826
- Architectural style: Greek Revival
- NRHP reference No.: 76000025
- Added to NRHP: 17 August 1976

The St. Francis Xavier Cathedral (also known as the Basilica of St. Francis Xavier, or simply "The Old Cathedral"; French: Basilique Saint-François-Xavier de Vincennes) is a historic Catholic church in Vincennes, Indiana, under the Diocese of Evansville. Named for Francis Xavier, the 16th-century Jesuit missionary, it is located opposite George Rogers Clark National Historical Park at 205 Church Street, within the Vincennes Historic District.

Jesuit missionaries established St. Francis Xavier parish around 1734 on land donated by the King of France, making it the oldest Catholic parish in Indiana; its earliest parish records date from 1749. The present Greek Revival-style basilica church, built on or near the site of two earlier Catholic churches, dates from 1826. In 1834, when Pope Gregory XVI erected the Diocese of Vincennes, St. Francis Xavier was elevated to a cathedral and served as the seat of the episcopal see from 1834 to 1898. On 14 March 1970 Pope Paul VI elevated St. Francis Xavier Cathedral to the status of minor basilica, "an honor reserved for only the most historic churches."

Between 1834 and 1898 two of St. Francis Xavier's priests became bishops (Benedict Joseph Flaget, Bishop of Bardstown, and Célestin de la Hailandière, Bishop of Vincennes), and several served as vicars general or seminary rectors. Between 1837 and 1882 seventy-five priests were ordained at St. Francis Xavier, including Michael E. Shawe, the first priest ordained in Indiana. Bishop John Stephen Bazin's episcopal consecration at St. Francis Xavier in 1847 was the first to be conducted in the state. The remains of the first four Bishops of Vincennes (Simon Bruté, de la Hailandière, Bazin, and Jacques Maurice de St. Palais) are buried in St. Francis Xavier's crypt. The basilica was added to the National Register of Historic Places in 1976.

== History ==
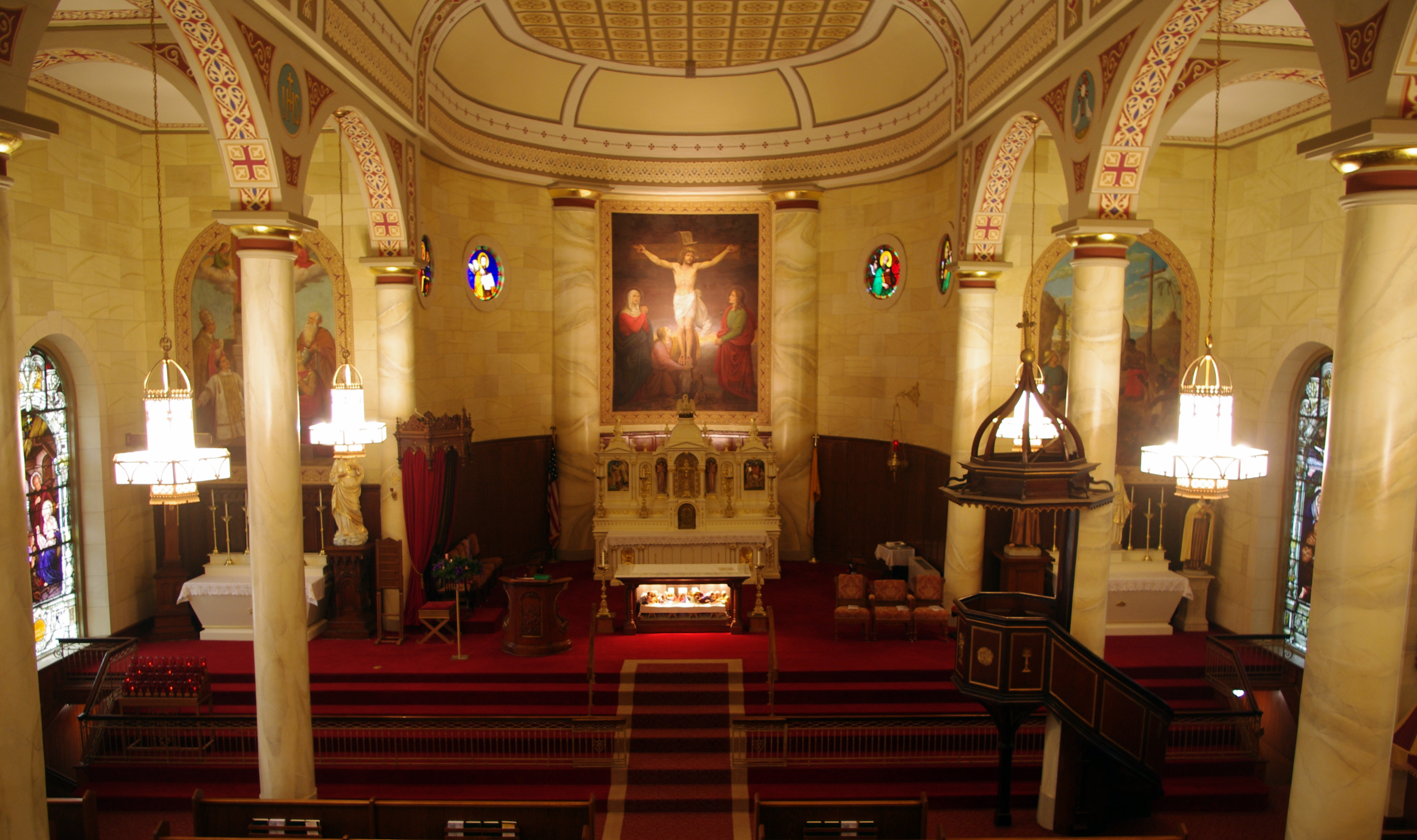
The basilica interior

The history of St. Francis Xavier parish is closely tied to development of the Catholic Church in Indiana—the parish has ties to six Roman Catholic dioceses in North America: the Diocese of Quebec, Canada, the Diocese of Baltimore, Maryland, the Diocese of Bardstown, Kentucky, the Diocese of Vincennes, Indiana, the Diocese of Indianapolis, Indiana, and the Diocese of Evansville, Indiana. After St. Francis Xavier's establishment as an early Jesuit mission in the seventeenth century, it became the seat of the Diocese of Vincennes in the nineteenth century, and achieved its present-day status as a basilica in 1970.

=== Jesuit mission (1732–1763) ===
St. Francis Xavier, the oldest Catholic parish in Indiana, traces it origins from the early Jesuit missionaries, who visited the area on the Wabash River as early as 1732. Vincennes was named for a Canadian soldier, François-Marie Bissot, Sieur de Vincennes, and the site became an important French trading post and military garrison in the Northwest Territory.

St. Francis Xavier's first resident priest was Father Sebastian Louis Meurin, S.J., who arrived in May 1748. The earliest parish record is the marriage between Julien Trattier, of Montreal, Canada, and Josette Marie, the daughter of a Frenchman and an Indian woman; it is dated 21 April 1749. The parish's first baptism, recorded on 25 June 1749, was John Baptist, the son of Peter Siapichagane and Catharine Mskieve. In December 1750, Madam Trattier, who was the first to be married in the church, became one of the parish's first deaths, at age eighteen. She was buried in St. Francis Xavier's first parish church, under her pew. Father Meurin's last official act, the burial of “the wife of a Corporal in the garrison", was recorded on 17 March 1753. During this time all certificates except those of deaths are signed by “M. de St. Ange, Lieutenant of Marines and Commandant for the King, at Post Vincennes.” Father Meruin, who transferred to Prairie du Rocher in 1753, was succeeded by Father Louis Vivier, S. J., whose first recorded act is a marriage on 20 May 1753. Father Vivier died at Vincennes in October 1756, The first record from the parish's next resident priest, Father Julian Duvernay, is dated 28 August 1756. During this early period of the parish's history the number of baptisms and marriages, half of which were Indians or slaves that belonged to the garrison commandant or the village inhabitants, small, but increasing. Following the Treaty of Paris (1763), when the Jesuits were banished from the area, Father Duvernay left Vincennes, but the Diocese of Quebec retained its ecclesiastical jurisdiction over St. Francis Xavier church.

=== Parish church (1763–1834) ===
Between 1763 and 1785 St. Francis Xavier parish did not have a resident priest. During the interim a notary public administered baptism as a layman, and recorded the names on the register. In 1770, after the inhabitants of Vincennes requested a priest for their parish, the Bishop of Quebec sent Father Pierre Gibault to visit Vincennes. Father Gibault, who returned to Vincennes during the American Revolutionary War, administered an oath of allegiance to its French inhabitants at St. Francis Xavier church in 1788. This oath to the Americans placed Vincennes under the Commonwealth of Virginia. On 25 February 1779 British General Henry Hamilton surrendered Fort Sackville to Colonel George Rogers Clark at St. Francis Xavier church. In 1785 Father Gibault returned to Vincennes to become the parish's first resident priest in more than twenty years. He left Vincennes on 11 October 1789, and no resident priests replaced him until 1792.

On 6 November 1789, when Pope Pius VI erected the Diocese of Baltimore as the first Catholic diocese in the United States, St. Francis Xavier was placed under its ecclesiastical jurisdiction. John Carroll, the first Bishop of Baltimore, sent Father Benedict Joseph Flaget to Vincennes as the parish's permanent priest. Father Flaget arrived on 21 December 1792. He opened a parochial school at the church before he was recalled to Baltimore in 1795. Father Jean François (John Francis) Rivet, who was Father Flaget's replacement at St. Francis Xavier, established a college, the predecessor to Vincennes University, and held classes in the church rectory. He died at Vincennes in 1804, once again leaving the parish without a resident priest.

In September 1808, when Father Flaget was appointed the first bishop of the Diocese of Bardstown, St. Francis Xavier was placed under the jurisdiction of the new diocese. In 1814 Bishop Flaget became the first Catholic bishop to visit Indiana. Visiting priests continued to serve St. Francis Xavier parish until Bishop Flaget appointed Fathers Blanc and Jeanjean as resident priests on 25 April 1818. Several other priests served the parish until 1823, when Father Leo Champomier was the appointed St. Francis Xavier's resident priest. In 1825, at the direction of Bishop Flaget, Father Champomier proposed construction of a new brick church that became the present-day St. Francis Xavier Basilica.

=== Diocesan cathedral (1834–98) ===
On 6 May 1834 Pope Gregory XVI issued a Papal Bull to erect the Diocese of Vincennes, the first Catholic diocese in Indiana. St. Frances Xavier became the cathedral church for the new diocese and served as the seat of the episcopal see under all five Bishops of Vincennes. Father Simon Bruté de Rémur was consecrated as the first Bishop of Vincennes on 28 October 1834 at St. Louis; he died at Vincennes on 26 June 1839. Father Célestin de la Hailandière, Bishop Bruté's vicar general, was consecrated as the second Bishop of Vincennes on 18 August 1839 in Paris, France, but resigned from the post in 1847. During Hailandière's tenure as bishop, the Illinois portion of the Diocese of Vincennes was erected as the Diocese of Chicago in 1843. When Rev. John Stephen Bazin was consecrated the third Bishop of Vincennes, on 24 October 1847 at St. Francis Xavier Cathedral, he became the first Catholic bishop consecrated in Indiana. Bishop Bazin's tenure was a short one; he died at Vincennes on 23 April 1848. Father Jacques Maurice de St. Palais, the fourth Bishop of Vincennes, was consecrated at St. Francis Xavier on 14 January 1849, and served until his death on 28 June 1877. In 1857, while St. Palais was Bishop of Vincennes, the northern half of Indiana was erected as the Diocese of Fort Wayne. Rev. Francis Silas Chatard, the fifth and final Bishop of Vincennes, was consecrated at St. Francis Xavier on 12 May 1878; however, he chose Indianapolis, the state capital of Indiana and the largest city in the diocese, as the new seat of the episcopal see. Between 1837 and 1882 seventy-five priests were ordained at St. Francis Xavier, including Michael E. Shawe, the first priest ordained in Indiana. In 1898 the episcopal see was moved to Indianapolis and it became the Diocese of Indianapolis. Bishop Chatard was its first bishop.

=== Since 1898 ===
St. Francis Xavier remained under the jurisdiction of the Diocese of Indianapolis from 1898 to 1944, when Pope Pius XII elevated the episcopal see to the Archdiocese of Indianapolis and established two new suffragan diocese in Indiana: the Diocese of Evansville and the Diocese of Lafayette. On 14 March 1970 Pope Paul VI raised the status of St. Francis Xavier Cathedral to a basilica.

== Cathedral design and construction ==
The present Greek Revival-style basilica dates from 1826, making it the oldest Catholic church in Indiana. It was built on or near the site of two earlier churches. The first chapel, a crude structure measuring 22 feet by 66 feet, with log posts, mud daub, and a bark roof was erected circa 1734, around the time that Vincennes was founded. A second log church, which replaced the older structure, was dedicated on 3 December 1785. It measured 90 feet by 42 feet and had a small bell tower. The earlier church was renovated and converted to a rectory.

On 24 July 1825 Father Jean Leon Champomier held a parish meeting to consider his proposal to erect a new brick church, which became the present-day St. Francis Xavier Basilica. Its cornerstone of Tennessee marble was laid on 30 March 1826. A strong storm struck Vincennes on 6 November 1826, and destroyed two walls of the unfinished church, but the church was rebuilt. The first services were held in the new church during the summer of 1827, although the interior was not yet complete and had little decoration.

When Bishop Bruté, the first Bishop of Vincennes, arrived at Vincennes on 5 November 1834 the church was still unfinished. Bishop Hailandière, the second Bishop of Vincennes, continued work on the cathedral. In April 1840 the south end collapsed, but it was rebuilt. Bishop Hailandière consecrated the cathedral on 8 August 1841 Bede O'Connor, O.S.B., vicar general to Bishop St. Palais, fourth Bishop of Vincennes, supervised the cathedral's interior decoration. Father Hugo Peythieu procured fourteen oil paintings from France for the Stations of the Cross.

=== Cathedral library ===
The small brick building that became known as Old Cathedral Library was erected adjacent to the church in 1840 to house Bishop Bruté's personal collection of more than 5,000 books and other documents. His collection became the nucleus for the cathedral's library, the first library to be established in Indiana. In 1968 the Lilly Endowment provided grant funds to construct a new museum and library building to house the collection, which had grown to contain more than 11,000 rare books and volumes. Its oldest document, which is hand engraved on parchment, is an original papal document from Pope John XXII that dates from 1319.

== Description ==
The basilica is the main structure in a complex that also includes a Greek Revival-style rectory (1841), the old library (1840), a library/museum building (1968), and an adjacent cemetery.

=== Exterior and plan ===
The simple Greek Revival-style basilica is constructed of reddish orange brick laid in Flemish bond. Its plan is based on the St. Joseph Cathedral at Bardstown, Kentucky. St. Francis Xavier measured 115 feet by 60 feet; each side had five windows and its façade had a window over each of its three entrance doors. In 1834 Bishop Bruté described the unfinished church as a plain brick building without plaster or whitewash, with a simple wooden altar, a gilded tabernacle, a cross, and six candlesticks. After his arrival the roof was strengthened, the interior was plastered, and a sacristy was added. The sanctuary was later enlarged and its floor raised to allow excavation for a burial crypt. Bishop Hailandière also had a ciborium pulpit, a new high altar with saints' relics, and side altars added to the cathedral. Other additions included stone steps across the front, an enlarged organ gallery, and installation of a new organ. More alterations were made in 1908 (new windows and brick buttresses added to the side walls) and in 1911 (the second-level windows were closed).

A bell tower designed by architect Jean Marie Marsile was added in the 1830s at a cost of $1,566. The steeple bell (ca. 1742) in the upper belfry originally hung in the parish's first church.

Statues of St. Joan of Arc, St. Francis Xavier, and St. Patrick stand in arched niches on the cathedral's façade. A statue of Father Pierre Gibault in front of the cathedral honors his assistance to the Americans during the American Revolutionary War.

=== Interior ===
Wilhelm Lamprecht (1838 –1922), who studied at the Academy of Fine Arts, Munich, came to America to paint, and decorated churches in Newark, New Jersey, Cincinnati, Ohio, and Vincennes. Lamprecht painted three large murals for St. Francis Xavier in 1870: a Crucifixion scene above the high altar; a Madonna with the patron saints of the first four bishops of Vincennes (Saints Simon, Celestine, Stephen, and Maurice) above the Blessed Mother altar; and Saint Francis Xavier, the parish's patron saint, above the Saint Joseph altar.

The fourteen oil paintings installed in the sanctuary for the Stations of the Cross came from France, ca. 1883. Their frames were carved locally.

Von Gerichten Art Glass Company of Columbus, Ohio, created the stained glass windows depicting Saints Matthew, Mark, Luke, and John in 1908.

Large Doric columns support the basilica's arched ceiling. They are made of yellow poplar encased in plaster and painted to resemble marble.

== Services ==
St. Frances Xavier parish is under the jurisdiction of the Diocese of Evansville.

As of February 2026, Mass is celebrated on Sunday, at 8:00 am in Spanish and 5:30 pm in English; on Tuesday (during the school year) at 8:10 am; on Wednesday at 6:00 pm; on Thursday at 8:00 am in Spanish; on Friday at 12:00, Noon; and Saturday at 7:30 am. Reconciliation is available at 11:30 am on Friday; and at 5:00 pm on Sunday.

The basilica's library and museum are open Memorial Day through Labor Day, Mon.–Sat., 12:30–4 p.m., or by appointment.

== Ordinaries ==
Five bishops served the Diocese of Vincennes since St. Francis Xavier's consecration on 8 August 1841.

1. Simon Bruté de Rémur (Consecrated 28 October 1834–Died 26 June 1839)
2. Célestine de la Hailandière (Consecrated 18 August 1839–Resignation accepted 29 March 1847)
3. John Stephen Bazin (Consecrated 24 October 1847–Died 23 April 1848)
4. Jacques Maurice de St. Palais (Consecrated 14 January 1849–Died 28 June 1877); he also served as administrator of the diocese from Bishop Badin's death on 23 April 1848 to 14 January 1849.
5. Francis Silas Chatard (Consecrated 12 May 1878–Died 7 September 1918); Bishop Chatard became the first Bishop of Indianapolis on 28 March 1898, after the episcopal see was moved to Indianapolis.

The remains of the first four Bishops of Vincennes are buried in St. Francis Xavier's crypt. Bishop Chatard was interred at Saints Peter and Paul Cathedral (Indianapolis), but his remains were moved to Calvary Cemetery, Indianapolis, in 1976.

== See also ==
- List of Catholic cathedrals in the United States
- List of cathedrals in the United States
- Oldest churches in the United States
