= Marcy Village Apartments =

- U.S. National Register of Historic Places
- U.S. Historic district
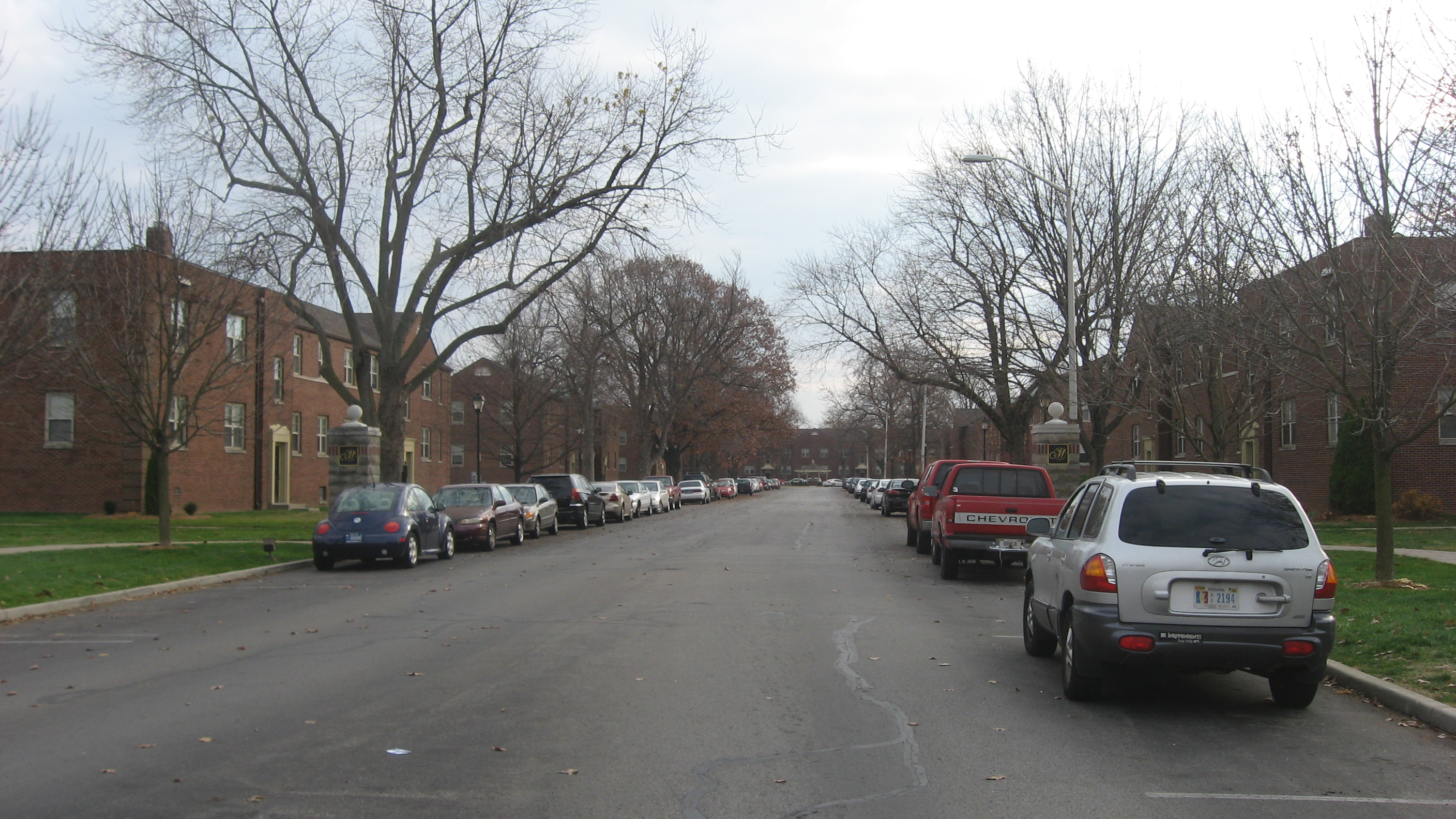

- Location within Indianapolis Location within Indiana Location within the United States
- Location: 4440-4567 Marcy Ln. and 1401 E. 46th St., Indianapolis, Indiana
- Coordinates: 39°50′19″N 86°8′4″W
- Area: 24 acres (9.7 ha)
- Built: 1939
- Architect: Granger and Bollenbacher
- Architectural style: Colonial Revival
- NRHP reference No.: 04000202
- Added to NRHP: March 24, 2004

Marcy Village Apartments is a historic community located in Indianapolis, Indiana, United States. Built in 1939, the 25-acre (10 ha), 19-building apartment community comprises a historic district listed on the National Register of Historic Places on March 24, 2004. Ground for the development was broken the week of March 20, 1939, and work was started full-time with Everett A. Carson of Indianapolis as the builder. Architects, Granger & Bollenbacher of Chicago, created the Colonial Revival apartment community for owners at the time, Marcy Realty Corporation.

== History ==
On October 10, 1938, the Board of Zoning Appeals held a project hearing on a petition for a variance to permit construction to start within two weeks on the $1,680,000 multi-apartment project in northeast Indianapolis. Samuel B. Sutphin of New Augusta, owner of the 25-acre site for the proposed project, filed the petition with the zoning board.

Purchase of the site by the Marcy Realty Corporation depended upon favorable action by the zoning board. The multi-apartment project was first planned by its sponsors on a tract at 59th Street and the Monon Railroad, but was abandoned when nearby property owners protested. The new site was bounded on the north by 46th Street between College and Keystone Ave in Indianapolis, just north of the Indiana State School for the Deaf. The development of the project took 500 workmen nearly eight months to construct.

The Marcy Village large-scale housing project was the first Federal Housing Administration project of its type completed in Indiana. The buildings are distributed over the twenty-five-acre tract.

Marcy Village, which represents an expenditure of approximately $1,690,000, was implemented under section 207of the National Housing Act of 1934. Under that section, sponsors may borrow from some private lending institution approved by the government any amount up to $5,000,000, at an interest rate not to exceed 4%, for terms to be approved by the administrator and which in some instances run as long as thirty-three years, for the construction of apartment buildings or groups of single-family buildings. At the time, Marcy Village was the 90th project completed in Indiana under that plan, though Marcy Village was the largest of its type in Indiana.

Colonial architecture is the primary design of the nineteen buildings of the project. In addition to the apartments, there were five storerooms occupied by shops, including a drug store, grocery store, barber shop, beauty shop, and dentists' and doctors' offices.

== General contractor ==
Everett A. Carson, an Indianapolis-based general contractor and father of Dr. Wayne Carson, a surgeon and sponsor, was the general contractor for the project. E. A. Carson built structures in and near Indianapolis, including the front for SS. Peter and Paul Cathedral on North Meridian Street, St. Joan of Arc Catholic Church, a parochial school building, and several academic buildings for Indiana University.

== See also ==
- National Register of Historic Places listings in Marion County, Indiana
