= List of churches in the Archdiocese of Indianapolis =

Roman Catholic Archdiocese of Indianapolis

This is a list of current and former Roman Catholic churches in the Roman Catholic Archdiocese of Indianapolis in Indiana in the United States The archdiocese covers the Indianapolis metropolitan area and Southern Indiana.

The cathedral church of the archdiocese is Saints Peter and Paul Cathedral in Indianapolis. The oldest parish in the archdiocese is St Mary of the Knobs, founded in 1823.

The parishes in the archdiocese are divided into 11 deaneries. As of 2024, the archdiocese had 126 parishes.

== Batesville deanery ==
Name	Image	Location	Description/notes
All Saints		25743 IN-1, Guilford	Combination of St. Joseph, St. Paul, St. John the Baptist and St. Martin Churches
Dearborn County Catholics		St. Lawrence Church, 542 Walnut St, Lawrenceburg	Parish founded in 1842, church dedicated in 1867. Now part of Dearborn County Catholics
		St. Mary of the Immaculate Conception Church, 203 4th St, Aurora	Founded in 1857. Now part of Dearborn County Catholics
		St. Teresa Benedicta of the Cross, 23455 Gavin Lane, Lawrenceburg	Founded in 2000. Now part of Dearborn County Catholics
Holy Family		3027 Pearl St, Oldenburg	Founded in 1837
Immaculate Conception		2081 E. Co Rd 820 S, Greensburg	Founded in 1840, current church dedicated in 1869
Oratory of SS. Philomena and Cecelia		16194 St. Mary's Rd, Brookville	Founded in 1844, operated by the Priestly Fraternity of St. Peter
St. Anthony of Padua		4773 Church Rd, Morris	Founded in 1866
St. Catherine of Siena		8874 Harrison St, Napoleon	Founded as St. Maurice in 1859, church dedicated in the early 1900s. Became St. Catherine of Siena parish in 2013
St. Charles Borromeo		213 W. Ripley St, Milan	Founded as a mission in 1908 and church dedicated that same year. Became a parish in 1948
John the Baptist		331 S. Buckeye St, Osgood	Founded in 1867
St. Joseph and St. Vincent de Paul Parishes		St. Joseph Church, 125 E. Broadway St, Shelbyville	Founded in 1865, current church dedicated in 1908. Now partnered with St. Vincent de Paul Parish
		St. Vincent de Paul Church, 4218 E. Michigan Rd, Shelbyville	Founded in 1838, current church dedicated in 1926
St. Louis		13 St. Louis Pl, Batesville	Founded in 1868, church dedicated in 1870
St. Mary		1331 E. Hunter Robbins Way, Greensburg	Founded in 1858
St. Michael and St. Peter Parishes		St. Michael Church, 145 E St Michaels Blvd, Brookville	Founded in 1845. Now partnered with St. Peter Parish
		St. Peter Church, 1207 East Rd, Brookville	Now partnered with St. Michael Parish
St. Nicholas		6461 E. St Nicholas Dr, Sunman	Founded in 1853, current church dedicated in 1856

== Bloomington deanery ==
Name	Image	Location	Description/notes
Catholic Community of Lawrence County		St. Vincent de Paul Church, 1723 I St, Bedford	Parish founded in 1864. Now part of the Catholic Community of Lawrence County
		St. Mary of the Assumption Church, 777 S. 11th St, Mitchell	Founded in 1869, current church dedicated in 1967. Now part of the Catholic Community of Lawrence County
Orange County Catholics		Our Lady of the Springs Church, 8796 IN-56, French Lick	Founded in 1887 and church dedicated that same year. Now part of Orange County Catholics
		Our Lord Jesus Christ the King Church, East Co Rd 150 N, Paoli	Founded in 1952. Now part of Orange County Catholics
St. Agnes		1008 McLary Rd, Nashville	Founded in 1940, current church dedicated in 2002
St. Charles Borromeo		2222 E. 3rd St, Bloomington	Founded in 1864, current church dedicated in 1952
St. John the Apostle and St. Jude the Apostle Churches		St. John the Apostle Church, 4607 W. State Road 46, Bloomington	Founded in 1970, current church dedicated in 1998. Now partnered with St. Jude the Apostle Church
		St. Jude the Apostle Church, 300 W. Hillside Ave, Spencer	Founded in 1951. Now partnered with St. John the Apostle Church
St. Martin of Tours		1709 E. Harrison St,Martinsville	Founded in 1934, current church dedicated in 1962
St. Paul Catholic Center		1413 E. 17th St, Bloomington	Founded in 1969 and current church dedicated that same year. Serves the Indiana University Bloomington community.

== Connersville deanery ==
Name	Image	Location	Description/notes
Catholic Community of St. Anne and St. Elizabeth of Hungary		St. Elizabeth of Hungary Church, 333 W. Maple St, Cambridge City	Parish founded in 1864, current church dedicated in 1880. Now merged with St. Anne Parish
		St. Anne Church, 102 N. 19th St, New Castle	Now merged with St. Elizabeth of Hungary Parish
St. Elizabeth Ann Seton		240 S. 6th St, Richmond	Founded in 2016
St. Gabriel & St. Bridget Parish		St. Bridget Church, 404 E. Vine St, Liberty	Founded in 1853 for Irish immigrants. Current church dedicated in 1905. Now merged with St. Gabriel Parish
		St. Gabriel Church, 232 W. 9th St, Connersville	Now merged with St. Bridget Parish.
St. Mary of the Immaculate Conception		512 N. Perkins St, Rushville	Founded in 1857, current church dedicated in 1898

== Indianapolis East deanery ==
Name	Image	Location	Description/notes
Holy Spirit		7243 E. 10th St, Indianapolis	Parish founded in 1946
Our Lady of Lourdes		5333 E. Washington St, Indianapolis	Current church dedicated in 1942
St. Mary		311 N. New Jersey St, Indianapolis	Founded in 1858, current church dedicated in 1910
St. Michael the Archangel		3354 W. 30th St, Indianapolis	Current church dedicated in 1954
Saints Peter and Paul Cathedral		1347 N. Meridian St, Indianapolis	Classical Revival-style church built between 1906 and 1907
St. Philip Neri		550 N. Rural St, Indianapolis	Current church dedicated in 1909
St. Rita		1733 Dr Andrew J Brown Ave, Indianapolis	Founded in 1919
St. Therese Little Flower		4720 E. 13th St, Indianapolis	Founded in 1924, current church dedicated in 1962
St. Thomas the Apostle		523 S. Merrill St, Fortville	Current church dedicated in 1915, parish founded in 1961

== Indianapolis North deanery ==
Name	Image	Location	Description/notes
Christ the King		1827 Kessler Blvd, Indianapolis	Parish founded in 1939
Immaculate Heart of Mary		5692 Central Ave, Indianapolis	Founded in 1946
St. Andrew the Apostle		4052 E. 38th St., Indianapolis	Founded in 1946, current church dedicated in 1976
St. Joan of Arc		4217 Central Ave, Indianapolis	Founded in 1921; Roman basilica-style church dedicated in 1929
St. Lawrence		6944 E. 46th St, Indianapolis	Founded in 1950
St. Luke the Evangelist		7575 Holliday Dr. E, Indianapolis	Founded in 1961
St. Matthew the Apostle		4100 E. 56th St, Indianapolis	Founded in 1958, current church dedicated in 1986
St. Pius X		7200 Sarto Dr, Indianapolis	Founded in 1955
St. Simon the Apostle		8155 Oaklandon Rd, Indianapolis	Founded in 1960, current church dedicated in 2001
St. Thomas Aquinas		4600 N. Illinois St, Indianapolis	Founded in 1938, current church dedicated in 1969

== Indianapolis South deanery ==
Name	Image	Location	Description/notes
Good Shepherd		2905 Carson Ave, Indianapolis	Parish founded in 1993 with the merger of St. Catherine of Siena and St. James the Greater Parishes
Most Holy Name of Jesus		89 N. 17th Ave, Beech Grove	Founded in 1908 as Blessed Sacrament Parish, renamed in 1918. Current church dedicated in 1954
Our Lady of the Most Holy Rosary		520 Stevens St, Indianapolis	Parish founded in 1909 to serve the Italian community; current church dedicated in 1925
Nativity of Our Lord Jesus Christ		7225 Southeastern Ave, Indianapolis	Founded in 1948, current church dedicated in 1969
Sacred Heart of Jesus		1530 Union St, Indianapolis	Founded in the 1870s for German immigrants, church consecrated in 1895
St. Ann		6350 S. Mooresville Rd, Indianapolis	Founded in 1917, current church dedicated in 2009
St. Barnabas		8300 Rahke Rd, Indianapolis	Founded in 1965, current church dedicated in 1986
SS Francis and Clare of Assisi		5901 W. Olive Branch Rd, Greenwood	Founded in 1993, current church dedicated in 1997
St. John the Evangelist		126 W. Georgia St, Indianapolis	Founded in 1837. Listed on NRHP
St. Jude		5353 McFarland Rd, Indianapolis	Founded in 1959, current church dedicated in 1997
St. Mark the Evangelist		535 Edgewood Ave, Indianapolis	Founded in 1947, current church dedicated in 1993
St. Patrick		950 Prospect St, Indianapolis	Founded in 1865
St. Roch		3600 S. Pennsylvania St, Indianapolis	Founded in 1922, current church dedicated in 1952

== Indianapolis West deanery ==
Name	Image	Location	Description/notes
Holy Angels		740 W 28th St, Indianapolis	Parish founded in 1903, current church dedicated in 2021
Mary, Queen of Peace		1005 W. Main St, Danville	Founded in 1937 as a mission, current church dedicated in 1990
St. Anthony		337 N. Warman Ave, Indianapolis	Founded in 1891
St. Christopher		5301 W. 16th St, Indianapolis	Founded in 1937
St. Gabriel the Archangel		6000 W. 34th St, Indianapolis	Founded in 1963
St. Joseph		1401 S. Mickley Ave, Indianapolis	Founded in 1949
St. Malachy		9833 E. County Road 750 N, Brownsburg	Founded in 1869 for Irish immigrants, current church dedicated in 2008
St. Michael the Archangel		3354 W. 30th St, Indianapolis	Current church dedicated in 1954
St. Monica		6131 Michigan Rd, Indianapolis	Founded in 1957
St. Susanna		1210 E. Main St, Plainfield	Founded in 1952, church dedicated in 1971
St. Thomas More		1200 N. Indiana St, Mooresville	Founded in 1967

== New Albany deanery ==
Name	Image	Location	Description/notes
Catholic Community of Jeffersonville		Most Sacred Heart of Jesus Church, 1840 E. 8th St, Jeffersonville	Parish founded in 1952, current church dedicated in 2001. Now part of Catholic Community of Jeffersonville
		St. Augustine Church, 315 E. Chestnut St, Jeffersonville	Founded in the 1850s, current church dedicated in 1905. Now part of Catholic Community of Jeffersonville
Catholic Community of St. Mary and St. Joseph		St. Joseph Church, 312 E. High St, Corydon	Founded in 1916, current church dedicated in 1986. Now partnered with St. Mary Church
		St. Mary Church, 2500 St Mary's Dr. NE, Lanesville	Founded in 1852. Now partnered with St. Joseph Church
Holy Family		129 W. Daisy Ln, New Albany	Founded in 1954 and church dedicated that same year
Our Lady of Perpetual Help		1752 Scheller Ln, New Albany	Founded in 1950, current church dedicated in 1967
St. Anthony of Padua		316 N. Sherwood Ave, Clarksville	Founded in 1851, current church dedicated in 1972
St. Francis Xavier		101 N. Ferguson St, Henryville	Founded in 1869, current church dedicated in 1928
St. John Paul II		2253 W. St Joe Rd, Sellersburg	Founded in 2015 with the merger of St. Paul and St. Joe Hill Parishes
St. Mary		415 E. 8th St, New Albany	Founded in 1853, current church dedicated in 1858
St. Mary of the Annunciation		7500 Navilleton Rd,Navilleton	Founded as a mission in 1845, permanently became a parish in 1938.
St. Mary of the Knobs		5719 St Marys Rd, Floyds Knobs	Founded in 1823, St. Mary is the old parish in the archdiocese.
St. Michael		101 St Michaels Dr, Charlestown	Founded as a mission in 1860, current church dedicated in 1982
Tri Parish Community		St. Michael Church, 11400 Farmers Ln. NE, Greenville	Now part of the Tri Parish Community
		St. Bernard Church, 7600 Hwy. 337 NW, DePauw	Now part of the Tri Parish Community

== Seymour deanery ==
Name	Image	Location	Description/notes
American Martyrs and St. Patrick Churches		American Martyrs Church, 270 S. Bond St, Scottsburg	Parish founded in 1938. Now partnered with St. Patrick Church
		St. Patrick Church, 208 S. Shelby St, Salem	Now partnered with American Martyrs Church
Holy Trinity		100 Keeley St, Edinburgh	Founded in 1851
Prince of Peace		Prince of Peace Church, 413 E. Second St, Madison	Founded in 1993 with the merger of St. Patrick, St Anthony, St. Mary, and St. Michael Parishes. Current church was dedicated in 1851.
Most Sorrowful Mother of God		591 Ferry St, Vevay	Founded in 1875, partnered with Prince of Peach Parish
St. Ambrose		325 S, Chestnut St, Seymour	Founded in 1860, current church dedicated in 1871
Catholic Churches of Jennings County		St. Ann Church, 4570 N County Rd, 150 E, North Vernon	Current church dedicated in 1866. Now part of Catholic Churches
		St. Joseph Church, 1875 S. County Rd, North Vernon	Founded as St. James Parish in 1850, church dedicated as St. Joseph in 1892. Now part of Catholic Churches
		St. Mary Church, 212 Washington St, North Vernon	Dedicated in 1868 as Church of the Nativity of the Blessed Virgin. Now part of Catholic Churches
St. Bartholomew		1306 27th St, Columbus	Founded in 1841, current church dedicated in 2001
St. Rose of Lima		114 Lancelot Dr, Franklin	Founded in 1868, current church dedicated in 1965

== Tell City deanery ==
Name	Image	Location	Description/notes
Holy Cross		11056-11098 IN-62, St. Croix	Parish founded in 1860
Quad Parishes		St. Michael Church, Cannelton	Current church dedicated in 1869. Now part of the Quad Parishes
		St. Pius V Church, 330 Franklin St, Troy	Founded in 1838 for German immigrants. Current church dedicated in 1884. Now part of the Quad Parishes
		St. Mark Church, 5377 Acorn Rd, Tell City	Founded in 1863. Now part of the Quad Parishes
		St. Paul Church, 814 Jefferson St, Tell City	Now part of the Quad Parishes
St. Augustine		18020 Lafayette St, Leopold	Founded in 1837
St. Boniface/St Meinrad Parishes		Historic St. Boniface Church, 15519 IN-545,Fulda	Founded in 1847, current church dedicated in 1865. Now partnered with St. Meinrad Parish
		St. Meinrad Church, 19570 N. 4th St, Saint Meinrad	Founded in 1861 by the Abbey of Saint Meinrad, current church dedicated in 1960. Now partnered with St. Boniface Parish.
St. Isidore the Farmer		6501 St Isidore Rd, Bristow	Founded in 1968
St. Joseph		State Road 66, Marengo	Founded in 1855, current church dedicated in 1978. Now part of the Tri Parish Community

== Terre Haute deanery ==
Name	Image	Location	Description/notes
Annunciation		19 N. Alabama St, Brazil	Parish founded in the 1860s, current church dedicated in 1881
Sacred Heart and St. Joseph Churches		Sacred Heart 610 S 6th St, Clinton	Founded as a mission in 1883, became a parish in 1889. Current church dedicated in 1909. Now partnered with St. Joseph Church
		St. Joseph Church, 201 E Ohio St, Rockville	Founded as a mission in 1863, became a parish in 1904. Current church dedicated in the early 1970s
Sacred Heart of Jesus		2322 N. 13th 1/2 St, Terre Haute	Founded in 1924, current church dedicated in 1956
St. Benedict		111 S. 9th St, Terre Haute	Founded in the early 1860s for German immigrants. Current church dedicated in 1899
St. Joseph University Parish		113 S. 5th St, Terre Haute	Founded in 1837, current church started in 1910. Serves the Indiana State University and Rose-Hulman Institute of Technology communities
St. Margaret Mary		2405 S. 7th St, Terre Haute	Founded in 1920, current church dedicated in 1958
St. Paul the Apostle		202 E. Washington St, Greencastle	Founded in 1853, current church dedicated in 1866
St. Patrick		1807 Poplar St, Terre Haute	Founded in 1881, current church dedicated in 1956

== Other chapels ==
Name	Image	Location	Description/notes
Immaculate Conception		3301 St Marys Rd, West Terre Haute	Chapel consecrated in 1907, located at the motherhouse of the Sisters of Providence of Saint Mary-of-the-Woods
		Blessed Sacrament Chapel3301 St Marys Rd, Saint-Mary-of-the-Woods	Chapel consecrated in 1924. Supervised by the Sisters of Providence of Saint Mary-of-the-Woods
Immaculate Conception Convent Church		22143 Main St, Oldenburg	Chapel of the Sisters of St. Francis

== Former churches ==
Name	Image	Location	Description/notes
Holy Family		815 W. Main St, Richmond	Parish founded in 1953, closed in 2016
Holy Trinity		2618 W. Saint Clair St, Indianapolis	Founded in 1906, closed in 2014
St. Andrew Church		35 S. 5th St, Richmond	Founded in 1946, closed in 2016
St. Michael the Archangel		519 E Third St., Madison	First mass in 1839. Was merged with other Jefferson County parishes in 1993. Church available for tours, information on the Historic Madison Inc. website.
St. Mary		720 N. A St, Richmond	Founded in 1859, closed in 2016
St. Rose of Lima		Knightstown	Founded in 1872, closed in 2016
