= Mary Cleophas Foley =

American Roman Catholic nun

Mother Mary Cleophas Foley, S.P.
- Born: Margaret Teresa Foley; February 18, 1845; Scipio, Indiana
- Died: 1928 (aged 82–83)
- Burial place: Sisters of Providence Convent Cemetery, Saint Mary-of-the-Woods, Indiana
- Title: General Superior of the Sisters of Providence of Saint Mary-of-the-Woods
- Predecessor: Mother Euphrasie Hinkle
- Successor: Mother Mary Raphael Slattery
- Parent(s): James Byrne Foley and Mary O'Connor

Mother Mary Cleophas Foley, S.P., (February 18, 1845 – 1928) was the Superior General of the Sisters of Providence of Saint Mary-of-the-Woods, Indiana from 1890 to 1926. During her time in office, she completed the building of the Church of the Immaculate Conception (Saint Mary-of-the-Woods, Indiana) and built numerous other buildings at Saint Mary-of-the-Woods, Indiana, including a new Providence Convent, the Blessed Sacrament Chapel, and an infirmary.

Foley inaugurated Saint Mary-of-the-Woods College in 1909 and served as president of the college from 1890 to 1926. She introduced the cause for canonization for Mother Theodore Guerin, the foundress of the Sisters of Providence of Saint Mary-of-the-Woods, who was canonized a saint of the Roman Catholic Church in 2006. Foley also inaugurated the Sisters of Providence mission to China in 1920, making hers the first congregation of American religious women to set up a mission there.

== Early life ==
Mary Cleophas was born Margaret Teresa Foley in Scipio, Indiana to Irish immigrants James Byrne Foley and Mary O'Connor. She was raised with nine siblings in a household that practiced daily evening devotions including night prayers, the rosary and spiritual reading. Her older sister Mary Ann, born in 1843, entered the Sisters of Providence of Saint Mary-of-the-Woods around 1860 at the suggestion of the parish priest, Father Daniel Moloney. Mary Ann took the religious name Sister Aloysia.

Two years later, at the age of seventeen, Margaret too entered the congregation. She was brought by her father to Providence Convent on the evening of September 13, 1862, and was greeting by her sister, Sister Aloysia. She officially entered religious life the next day. In 1863 she received her religious name of Sister Mary Cleophas, after Mary of Cleophas, one of the women present at the crucifixion of Jesus.

Sister Mary Cleophas taught in Washington, Indiana from 1863 to 1864 and then at St. Patrick in North Madison, Indiana until 1867.

== Congregation administration ==
In 1868 Sister Mary Cleophas was elected novice mistress of the Sisters of Providence. She served in this capacity until 1886, in charge of the spiritual and professional development of the novices of the community. During this time, Sister Mary Cleophas worked closely with Bishop Francis Silas Chatard, Bishop of the Diocese of Vincennes (now the Roman Catholic Diocese of Indianapolis). Chatard created numerous changes in the formation process of new Sisters of Providence, including extending the education period prior to going on mission to two years instead of one.

In 1886 Sister Mary Cleophas became first assistant to superior general Mother Euphrasie Hinkle. At this time a main goal of the congregation was to receive papal approbation, or official recognition by the Vatican as a religious community. This was finally received in 1887.

On February 7, 1889, tragedy struck the community when Providence Convent, a three-story brick convent built by the congregation's foundress Saint Mother Theodore Guerin, was destroyed by fire. Around this time, Mother Euphrasie Hinkle's health began to deteriorate as well, and Sister Mary Cleophas stepped in to replace her.

== As Superior General ==
In July 1890, Sister Mary Cleophas was elected Superior General of the Sisters of Providence and was honored with the title of "Mother." From there on she was known as Mother Mary Cleophas Foley.

=== Constructing new buildings ===
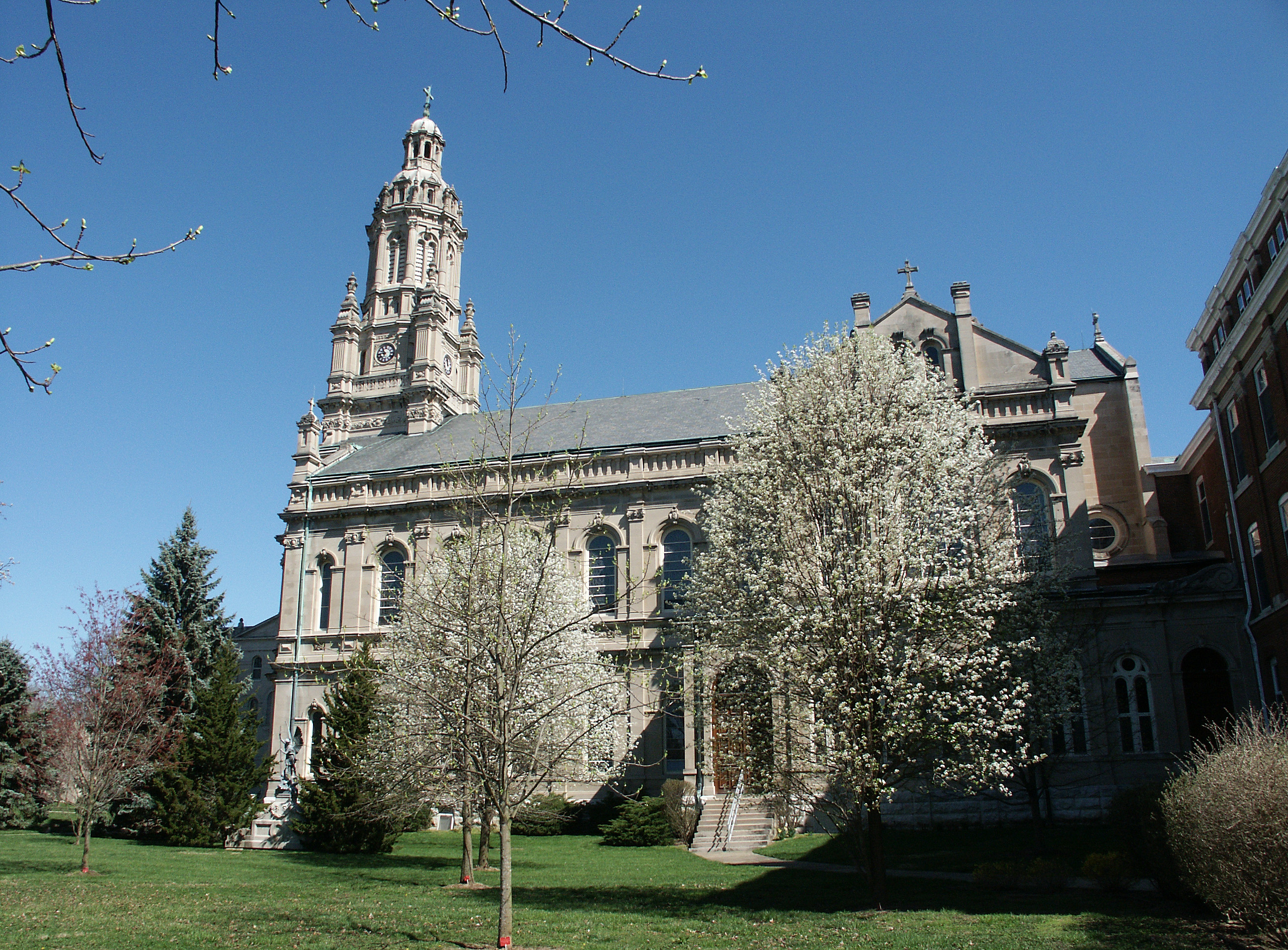
The Church of the Immaculate Conception.

Mother Mary Cleophas's first priority was completing the new Providence Convent to provide a home for her sisters. This building, a sturdy four-story brick structure, was completed and blessed in 1890. She also completed a new novitiate for sisters in 1904 and an infirmary for sisters with contagious diseases that same year.

She oversaw the completion of the Church of the Immaculate Conception, a large cathedral-like structure to serve as the primary worship space for the congregation. In 1902, Mother Mary Cleophas and Sister Mary Alma traveled to Europe to visit churches and gather inspiration for the interior of their church. The structure was completed in 1907.

In addition, Mother Mary Cleophas completed several buildings for the academy, the women's college on the motherhouse grounds now known as Saint Mary-of-the-Woods College. These buildings include Guerin Hall, the Conservatory of Music, and LeFer Hall.

Near the end of her life, Mother Mary Cleophas spent much of her time working on the Blessed Sacrament Chapel, a chapel for Eucharistic adoration. The structure was consecrated in 1924.

== Notes ==
Catholic Church titles
Preceded by Euphrasie Hinkle, SP	General Superior of the Sisters of Providence of Saint Mary-of-the-Woods; 1890 - 1926	Succeeded by Mary Raphael Slattery, SP
Educational offices
Preceded by Euphrasie Hinkle, SP	President of Saint Mary-of-the-Woods College; 1890 - 1926	Succeeded by Mary Raphael Slattery, SP
