= Mary Alma Ryan =

American Roman Catholic nun

Sister Mary Alma Ryan S. P.
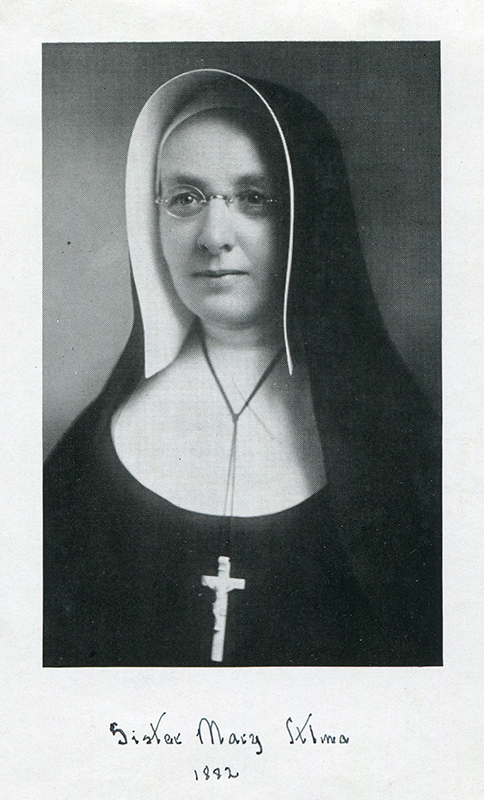

Personal life
- Born: Rosemary Ryan; January 12, 1863 Port Huron, Michigan
- Died: January 5, 1929 (aged 65) St. Mary-of-the-Woods, Indiana

Religious life
- Religion: Roman Catholic

Mary Alma Ryan (1863–1929) was the first graduate of the school that became Saint Mary-of-the-Woods College. As a Sister of Providence of Saint Mary-of-the-Woods, she later became superior of the same academy from which she graduated. She was a distinguished member of the council that governed the Sisters of Providence. For over 30 years she was the closest associate and confidante to Mary Cleophas Foley, their superior general.

== Early life and education ==
She was born Rosemary Ryan in Port Huron, Michigan, on January 12, 1863, to Mary Jeanne (Jane) Roberts Ryan, a French Canadian-American, and Daniel Ryan, originally from Tipperary, Ireland. Her mother was accomplished in piano, and Rosemary picked it up by ear, becoming a fine player. Her father was a grocer, and a member of the school board who emphasized education. She was the oldest of 11 children — six girls and five boys — who lived to maturity; others, including twins, died at birth.

She attended public school until the Sisters of Providence of Saint Mary-in-the-Woods opened their academy in 1880, at which time she transferred to it for her third year of high school. Her parents wanted her to finish at the public school and become a teacher, but the school run by the Sisters of Providence attracted her. Sacred Heart Academy in Port Huron was their two-year boarding school for girls. Mother Mary Theodosia Mug recalled her coming to them with her arms full of music books even though they had not sought her out. She was proficient in French and Latin, and showed additional ability in logic and astronomy. She became the first graduate of their Sacred Heart Academy, which became Saint Mary-of-the-Woods College.

== Life as a sister ==
She entered the novitiate of the Sisters of Providence on July 9, 1882, when she was 19 years old. She had high spirits and preferred sledding to chores, but she was also considered a "precious stone" by her superiors. She was an organist and choir director, and taught music in the high school where she had been a student. She took her final vows on August 15, 1885.

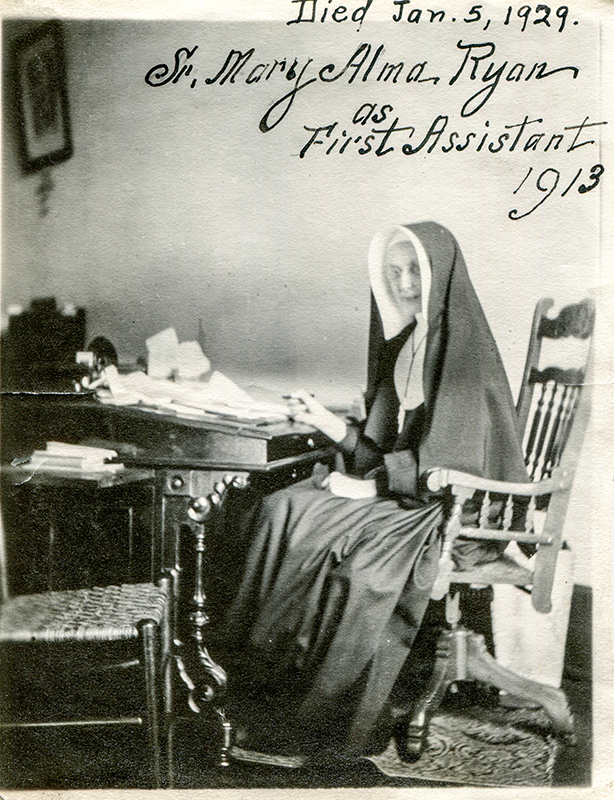

In 1897 she became superior of the academy, and in 1900 she became prefect of studies. She was elected to the general council, serving from 1902 to 1906. She became the close companion of their Superior General, Mother Mary Cleophas Foley, and accompanied her in all matters for 30 years. In 1902, when she was Third Assistant Sister, she traveled to Europe with Mother Mary Cleophas, the first such trip for sisters since 1866, to visit churches and study styles for the building of their Church of the Immaculate Conception. They visited what was then known as Ruillé-sur-Loir in northwestern France, which held the Motherhouse. When in Rome they had an audience with Pope Leo XIII on January 11, 1903, and they visited Lourdes, from which Sister Mary Alma brought back a stone that was given to her for their grotto back home. Through her efforts the congregation was closely affiliated with the Religious of the Sacred Heart, and she connected the congregation to their Sodality of the Children of Mary, and the Prima Primaria Sodality in Rome.

== Various illnesses and death ==
Shortly after her election as superior of the academy in 1897, she suffered a severe scalding of one foot that left her somewhat lame for life, and needing a special shoe. She also endured several bouts of pneumonia, nearly dying of it in 1923. She was said to have had heart trouble all her life. She was violently injured in 1925 with a weeks-long recovery, after a cyclone, which the South Bend Tribune described as "one of the most severe" in the region's history, damaged the building in which she was working, shattering windows and knocking her to the floor.

When Mother Mary Cleophas was dying in December 1928, Sister Mary Alma said at her bedside, "If I go to heaven first, I shall take you; and if you go first, you must take me," perhaps an echo of the biblical Book of Ruth 1:16, "for where you go I will go, and where you lodge I will lodge; your people shall be my people, and your God my God" (RSV). Mother Cleophas died on December 27, 1928, and Sister Mary Alma died less than a week later of influenza on January 5, 1929.
