= Saints Peter and Paul Cathedral (Indianapolis) =

Church in Indianapolis, Indiana, U.S.

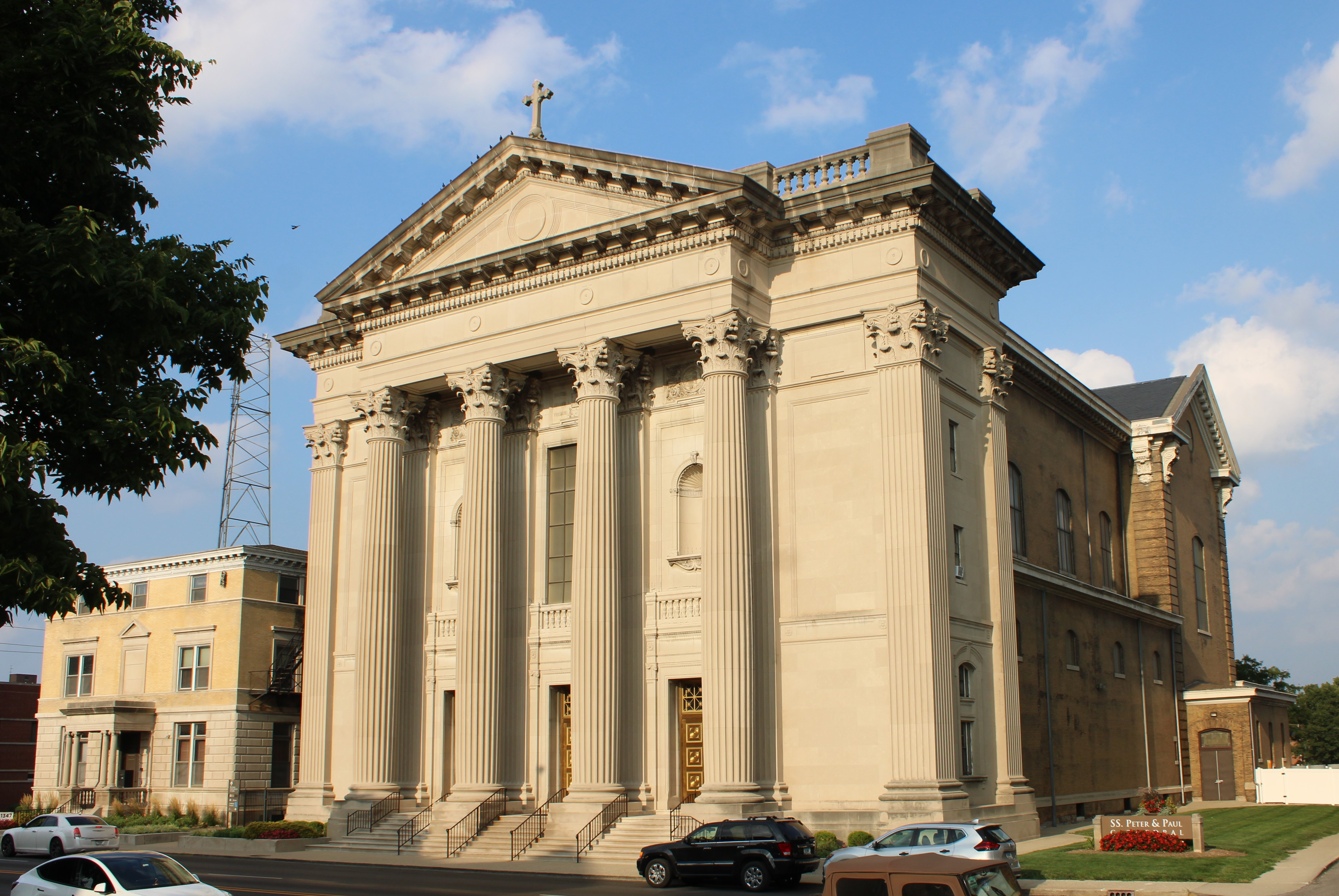
- Saints Peter and Paul Cathedral in 2023

- Location within Indianapolis Location within Indiana
- 39°47′07″N 86°09′25″W
- Location: 1347 North Meridian Street; Indianapolis, Indiana
- Country: United States
- Denomination: Roman Catholic Church
- Website: www.ssppc.org

History
- Founded: 1892
- Founder: Most Reverend Silas Chatard
- Dedicated: December 21, 1906; Rededicated May 14, 1986
- Consecrated: December 21, 1906

Architecture
- Architect(s): Renwick, Aspinwall & Russell; William W. Renwick
- Style: Classical Revival
- Completed: 1907

Specifications
- Capacity: 1,000
- Materials: Limestone; Brick

Administration
- Archdiocese: Indianapolis

Clergy
- Archbishop: Charles Coleman Thompson
- Rector: Rev. James Brockmeier, STL

Saints Peter and Paul Cathedral is a Roman Catholic cathedral located at Fourteenth and Meridian Streets in Indianapolis, Indiana, in the United States. It is the seat of the Archdiocese of Indianapolis, and of the Archbishop of Indianapolis, currently Archbishop Charles C. Thompson. The cathedral is named after the Apostles Peter and Paul, two disciples of Jesus Christ.

The rectory and chapel for the cathedral were completed in 1892. The cathedral and a temporary façade were built between 1905 and 1907; the permanent facade was erected in 1936. The high altar of the unfinished cathedral was consecrated on December 21, 1906. The cathedral underwent a major renovation in 1985 and 1986.

== History ==
=== 1870 to 1900 ===
During the 1870s, Indiana was under the jurisdiction of the Diocese of Vincennes, with the episcopal seat located in Vincennes, Indiana. Saint Francis Xavier Cathedral in Vincennes was the cathedral for the parish. However, by this time Indianapolis had become the largest city in the state, far larger than Vincennes. Bishop Jacques Maurice de St. Palais believe that the Vatican should move the episcopal seat to Indianapolis, but left that decision to his successor Silas Chatard. Chatard was consecrated as bishop of Vincennes on May 12, 1878; he immediately established residence in Indianapolis. Chatard designated Saint John the Evangelist Church in Indianapolis to serve as his pro-cathedral. However, it was his plan to eventually build a new cathedral in that city.

In August 1890, Chatard purchased five lots at Fourteenth and Meridian Streets in Indianapolis for the new cathedral. The purchase price was $32,500, paid with private donations within three years. He built a chapel and rectory on the site in 1892 in what would become Saints Peter and Paul Parish. The chapel was dedicated. In March 1892, Chatard and Monsignor Auguste Bessonies moved into the rectory in April 1892. Also in 1892, the Sisters of Providence opened the cathedral school.Chatard purchased five more lots at Fourteenth and Meridian Streets for $22,000 in July 1894 to allow additional space for the cathedral.

Four years later, on March 28, 1898, Pope Leo XIII suppressed the Diocese of Vincennes and erected the Diocese of Indianapolis. Saints Peter and Paul became the cathedral parish for the diocese. Chatard started raising funds for a new cathedral.

=== 1900 to present ===
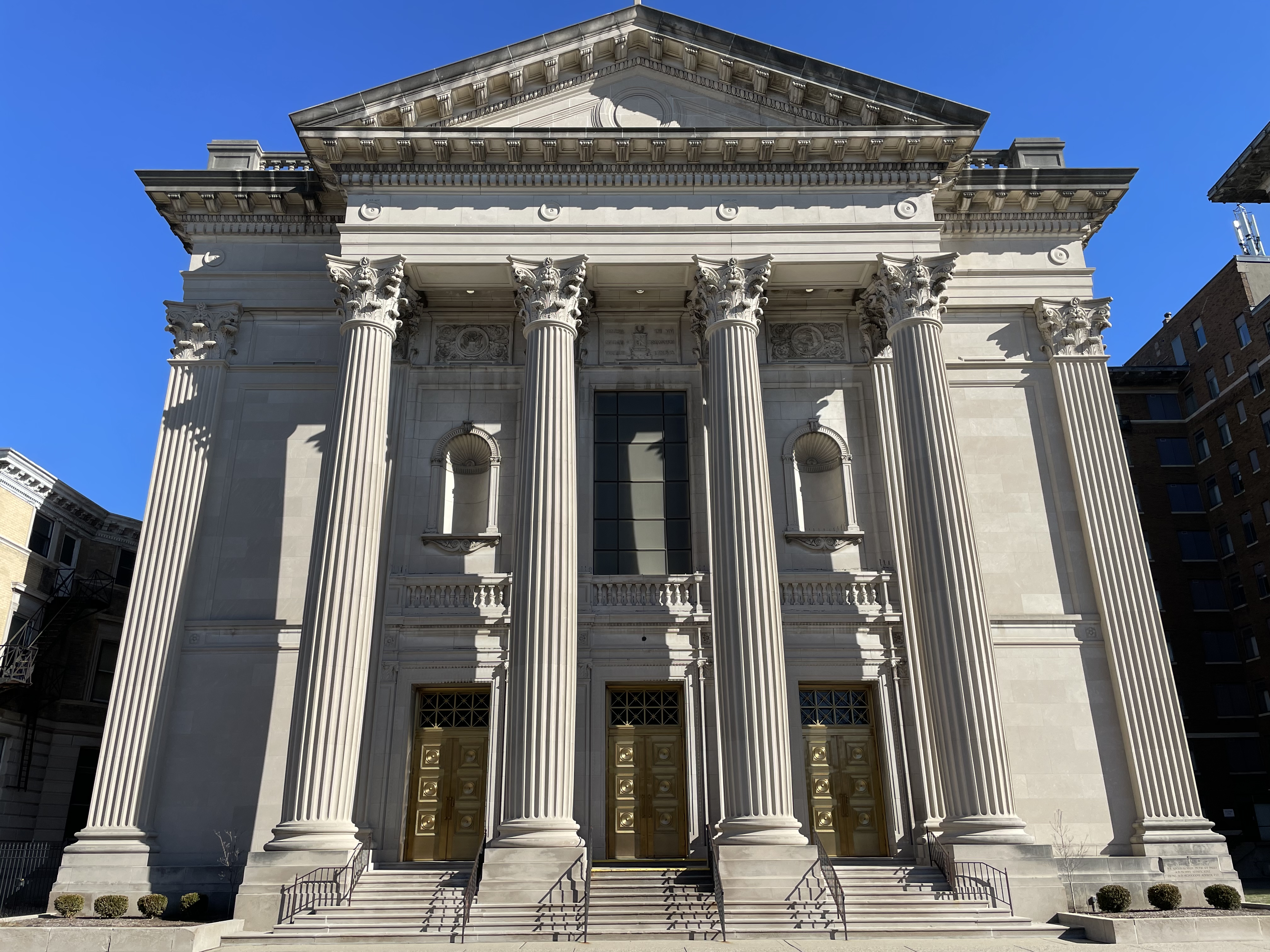
View from North Meridian St, Cathedral of Saints Peter & Paul (2023)

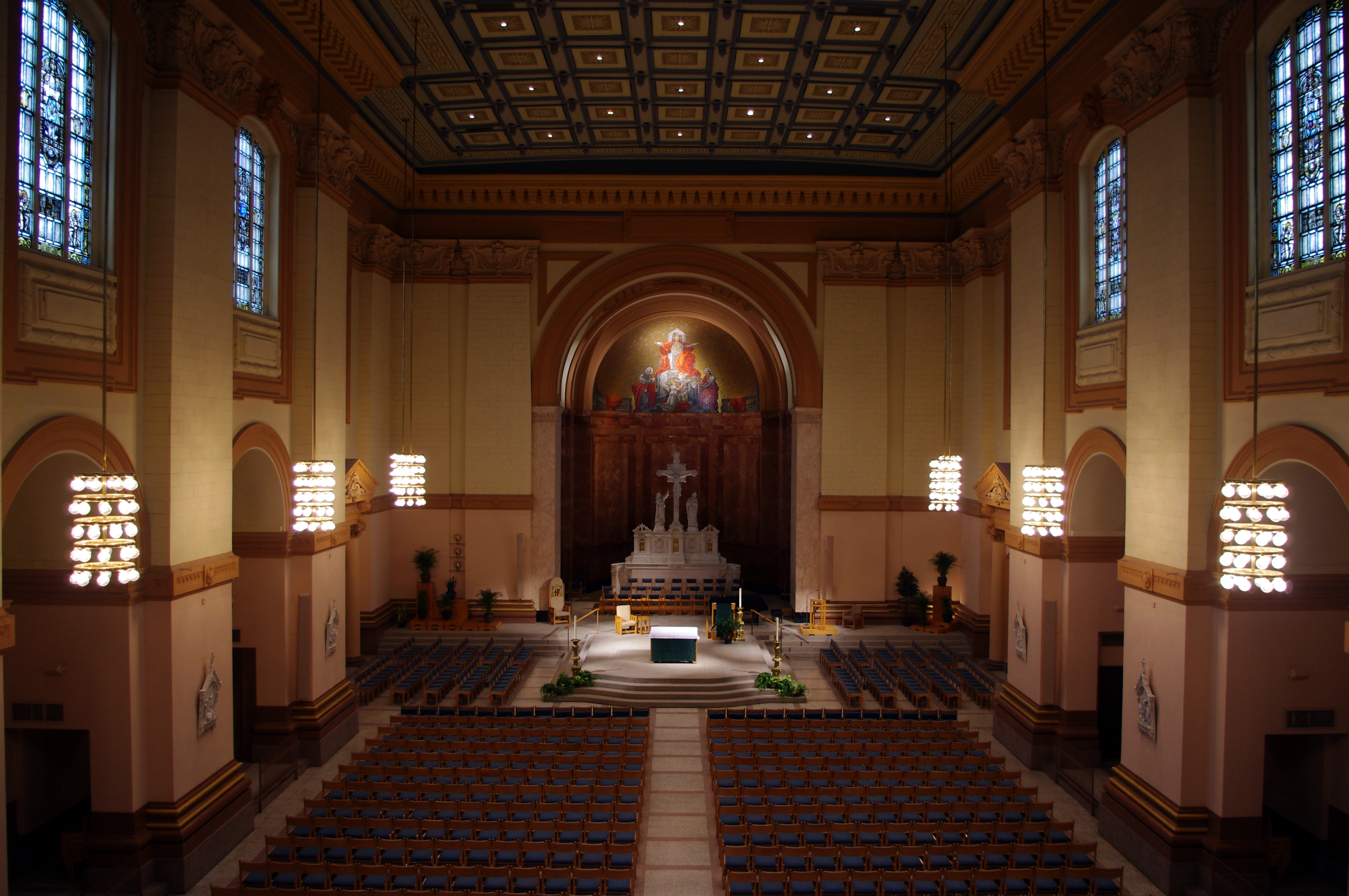
Nave, Saints Peter & Paul Cathedral (2012)

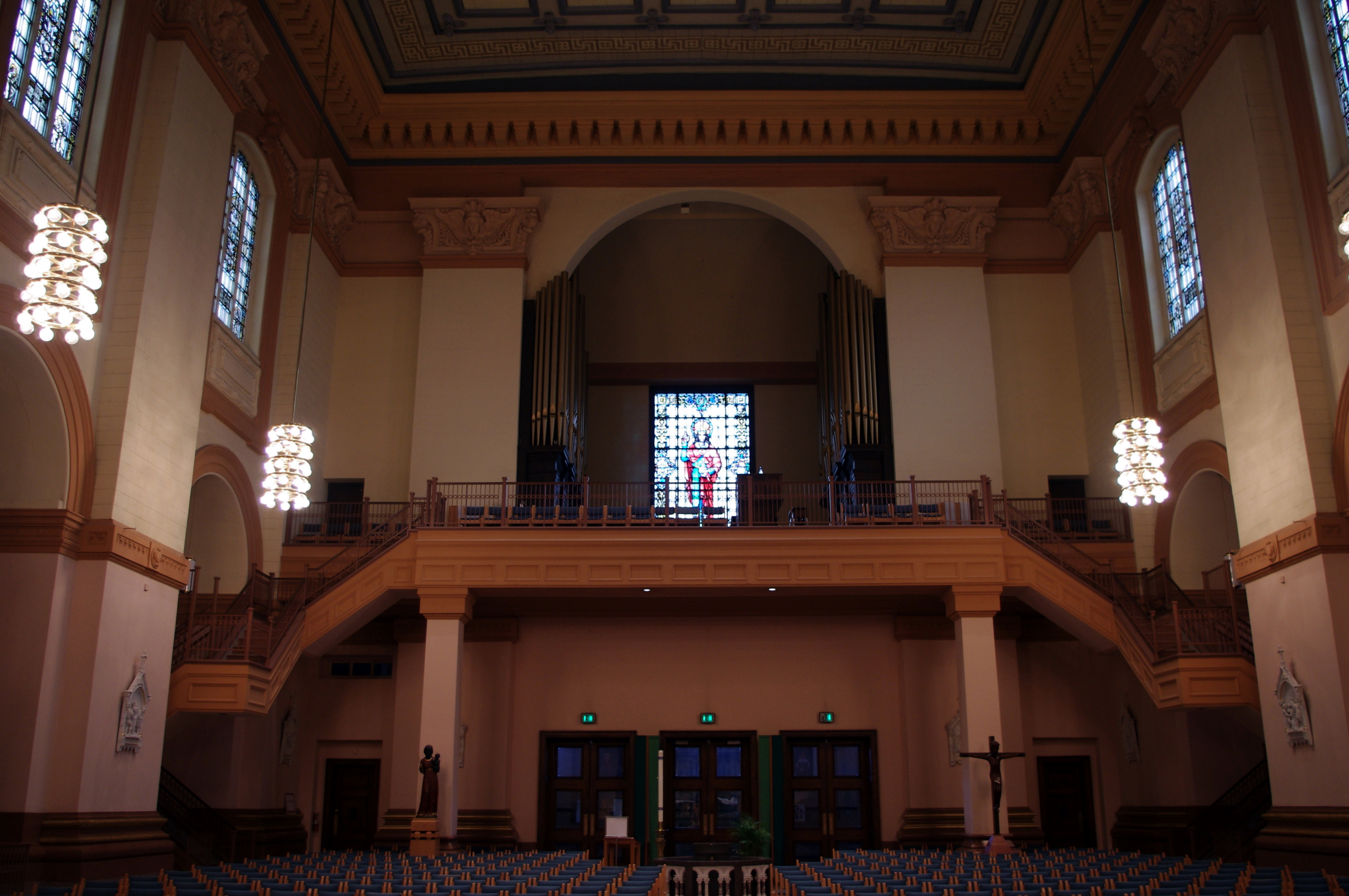
Organ loft, Saints Peter & Paul Cathedral (2012)

Construction began on Saints Peter and Paul Cathedral in August 1903. The high altar of the unfinished cathedral was consecrated on December 21, 1906, in a private ceremony, making it the sole cathedral in the diocese. The first pontifical high mass at the new cathedral took place on December 25, 1906. By this point, the project had cost $200,000.

In 1907, the diocese began a major renovation of the cathedral chapel, but the entry of the United States into World War I in April 1917 delayed its completion. In 1912, a separate school building was constructed on the cathedral campus. Chatard consecrated the newly named Blessed Sacrament Chapel in September 1918. Faced with an increased school enrollment, the diocese constructed a separate high school on the campus in 1922. By 1928, the parish membership was closed to 5,000 parishioners.

In 1936, the diocese started work on a permanent facade for the cathedral. It hired Indianapolis architect August Bohlen for the facade, which was designed by Layton DeMilt of the Bohlen architectural firm. The mosaic of Christ the king was installed in the apse and the floor of the nave was painted red and gold.

On October 21, 1944, Pope Pius XII elevated the Diocese of Indianapolis to the Archdiocese of Indianapolis.By 1976, due to declining enrollment, all the cathedral schools had been closed or merged to other locations. The diocese converted the Cathedral High School building into apartments.

In 1985, the archdiocese started a major renovation of the cathedral. It hired the firm of Sovik, Mathre, Sathrum, Quanbeck of Northfield, Minnesota, served as architects and planners. The changes included liturgical changes mandated at the Second Vatican Council in Rome during the early 1960s. The project had a $1.7 million budget. The refurbished cathedral was rededicated on May 14, 1986.

== Description ==
The cathedral is the main structure in a complex that also includes a three-story rectory, a two-story service wing, and the adjacent Blessed Sacrament Chapel. The cathedral has a seating capacity of 500 worshippers.

=== Design ===
At the beginning of the 20th century, Chatard hired the architectural firm of Renwick, Aspinwall & Russell from New York City to design Saints Peter & Paul Cathedral. The lead architect was William L. Coulter, who designed the cathedral, rectory, and adjacent chapel in the Classical Revival-style. It is believed that Coulter patterned the cathedral is patterned after the Archbasilica of Saint John Lateran in Rome, Italy, where Chatard was ordained a priest.

During the design process, the cathedral plan was modified to reduce its overall length and width and eliminate its domes and two side chapels. William W. Renwick took over sole responsibility for the cathedral project around 1900. The Indianapolis architectural firm of D. A. Bohlen and Son served as local supervisors for the project.

Renwick designed the cathedral's original interior décor, including three sanctuary altars, doorway and arch decoration, the metal ceiling, and frames for the stations of the cross. D. A. Bohlen and Son designed the interior's original holy water fonts and dark oak furnishings.

=== Exterior ===
Saints Peter & Paul Cathedral measures 188 feet (57 m) by 80 feet (24 m). Its walls and temporary facade were constructed of brick with limestone trim from Bedford, Indiana. The permanent facade is a Roman classical design in the Corinthian order. The exterior includes four fluted columns measuring 56 feet (17 m) tall and 5.5 feet (1.7 m) in diameter, with capitals 6.5 feet (2.0 m) high and 7 feet (2.1 m) across. The facade has three entrances with the following exterior carvings:

- The Great Seal of the United States over the north door
- The seal of Indiana over the south door
- A ship, a christogram,a labarum, and a Latin verse from I Timothy 3:15 over the middle door

The facade also includes two niches intended for statues of Saints Peter and Paul.

=== Interior ===
==== Description ====
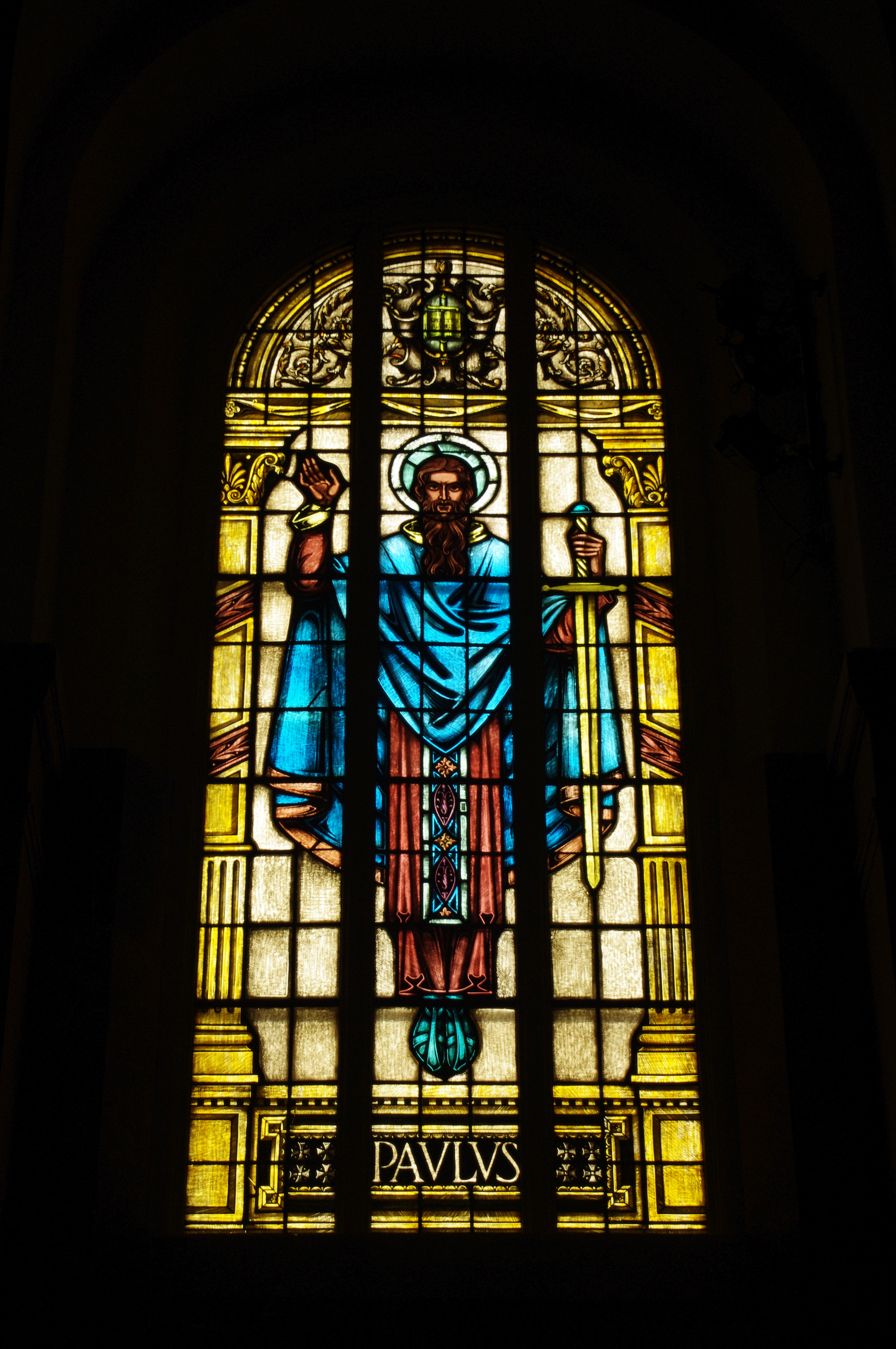
Window depicting Apostle Paul, Cathedral of Saints Peter & Paul (2012)

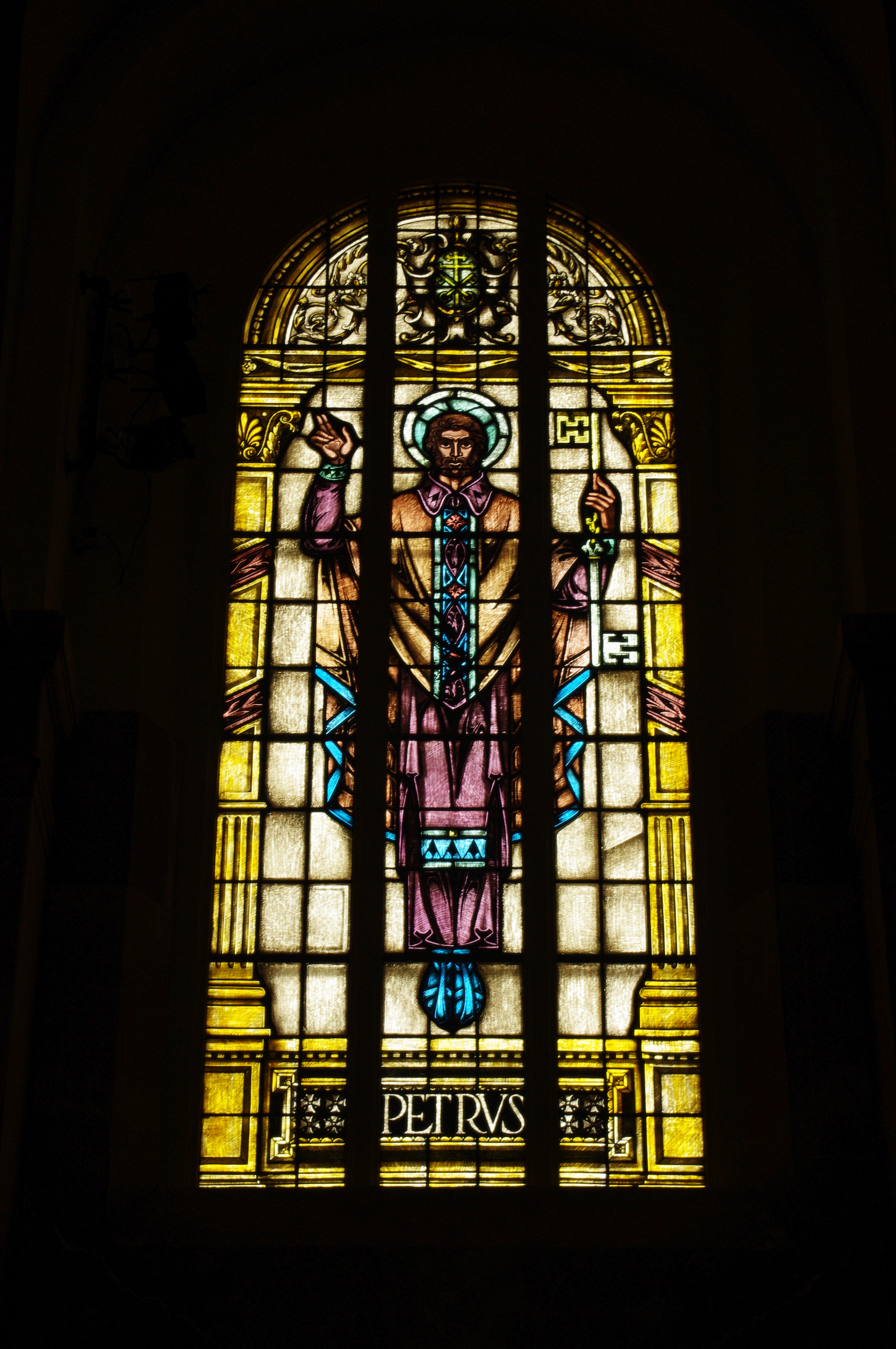
Window depicting Apostle Peter, Cathedral of Saints Peter & Paul (2012)

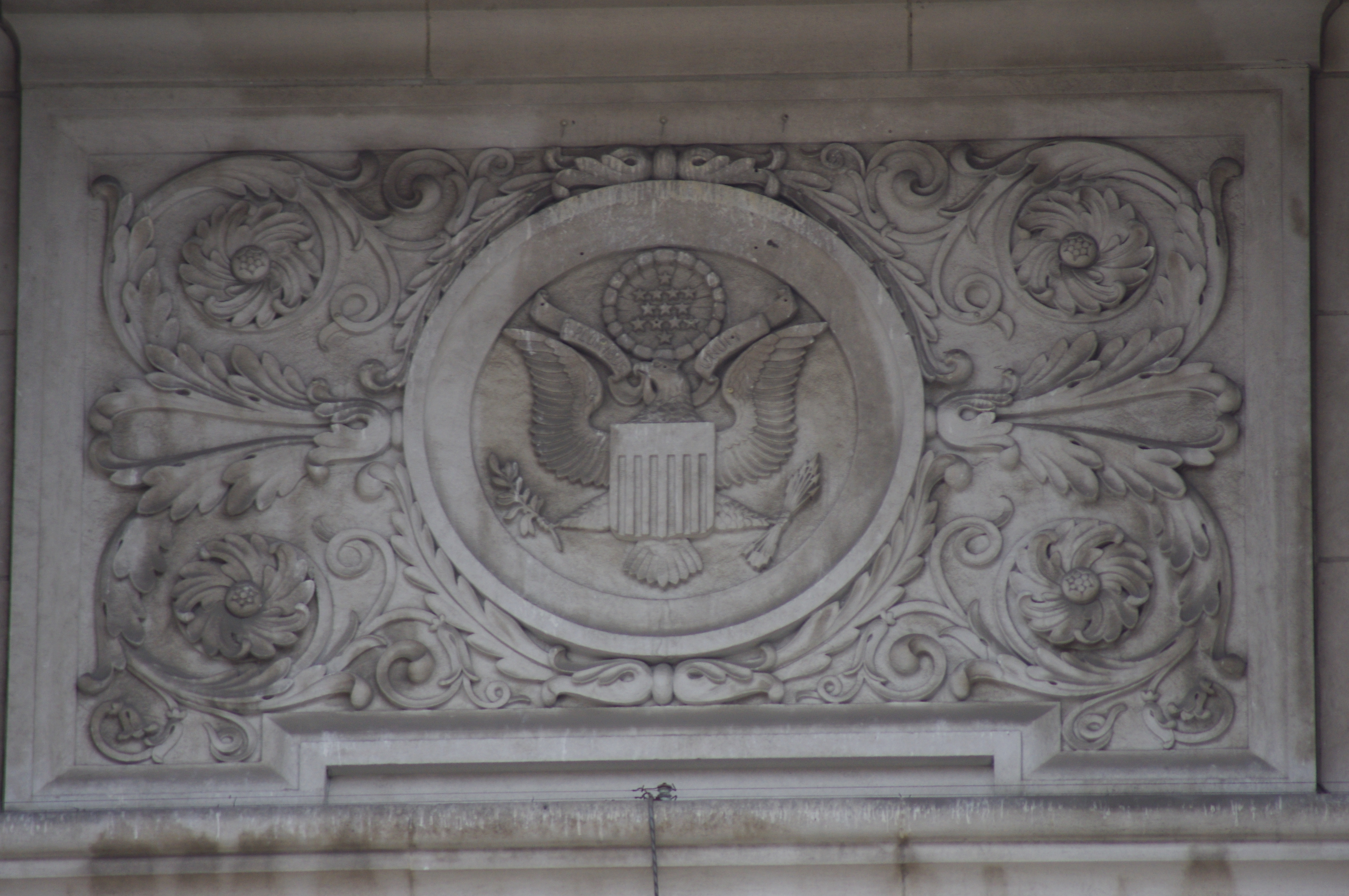
Great Seal of the United States over the north door, Cathedral of Saints Peter & Paul (2012)

Several major renovations have altered the cathedral's interior decoration. The original interior had tinted walls with ivory accents, and the heads of angels topped the panes between its windows. Side altars were installed in 1908. The original dark oak furnishings, which included pews, pulpit, confessional, confessional rails, a bishop's throne and canopy, sedilia, choir stalls, and vestment case, were later removed or replaced. The original terrazzo flooring, divided with light purple bands, and the marble high altar were also replaced.

In a sanctuary renovation in 1936, the floor was extended over the original stairway and covered in marble, the cathedrals walls were faced with marble, and a new baptistry was installed. The renovation also redesigned Renwick's original stations of the cross. The cathedral's organ, originally installed in 1907, was rebuilt.

The renovations of 1985 and 1986 included a major redecoration of the sanctuary and structural repairs to the exterior and interior. Changes to the sanctuary included

- relocation of some of the statuary
- a new color scheme, flooring, and lighting
- removal of the original pews
- addition of a white oak, marble-topped altar
- replacement of the marble cathedra with a white oak one
- a lectern to replace the marble pulpit

==== Windows ====
The cathedral contains 21 stained glass windows that were created by the Rambusch Decorating Company of New York City. The windows include the following depictions:

- depictions of the Apostles Peter and Paul
- the coats of arms of Chatard, Chartrand, Pope Pius X and Pope Pius XI
- symbols of the Four Evangelists (Mathew, Mark, Luke and John)
- wheat and grapes to symbolize the eucharist

The façade window in the organ gallery depicted Christ the King and Bishop Ritter's coat of arms.

==== Artwork ====
In 1940, a benefactor donated a painting entitled Madonna of the Forest to the cathedral. It was attributed to the 15th century Venetian artist Giovanni Bellini. It was restored and removed for safekeeping in 1974.

The painter Edgar S. Cameron of Chicago originally painted the upper apse in an early Byzantine style. Christ was at the center, flanked by Mary (mother of Jesus) and the Apostle Peter on the left and Saint Joseph and the Apostle Paul on the right. In 1936, the archdiocese covered these murals with glass mosaics that depicted Christ in Majesty, flanked by the Apostles Peter and Paul.

Chatard commissioned Cesare Aureli, an Italian sculptor, to carve the Blessed Mother and Child and Saint Joseph statues in white Carrara marble. They were installed around 1909. Aureli's statue of Frances de Sales was installed on the high altar in 1911. In 1915. a life-size Crucifixion was installed above the main altar. The sanctuary also includes a copy of Antonio Montauti's sculpture Pietà.

=== Rectory ===
The main entrance to the rector from Meridian Street opens into a wide interior corridor. The first floor's original plan had double parlors on the north, a reception room and bishop's study on the south, and a dining rom at the end of the corridor in the building's service area. The second floor included the bishop's quarters on the west and bedrooms on the north and east sides. The third floor, which was later remodeled into bedrooms, included four storage rooms with a large library at the center.

=== Blessed Sacrament Chapel ===
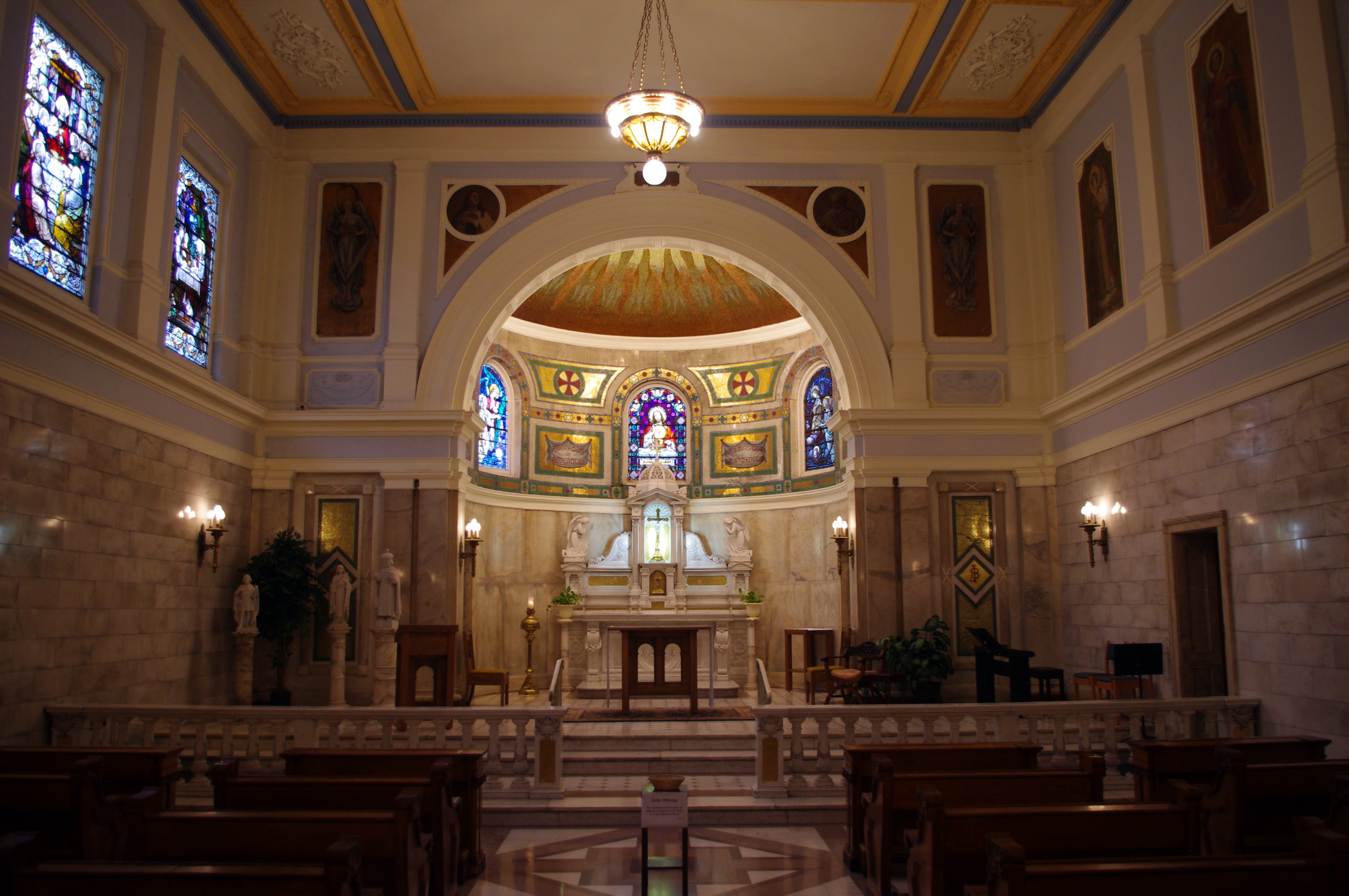
Blessed Sacrament Chapel, Cathedral of Saints Peter and Paul (2012)

The Blessed Sacrament Chapel measures 80 feet (24 m) by 34 feet (10 m) and has a main entrance flanked by double columns that support an arched roof. The interior is decorated in Venetian mosaics. Bernard Mellerio painted eleven angels on the walls, based on the angels painted by Fra Angelico that reside in the Museo Nazionale di San Marco in Florence, Italy.

The art-glass designs once included the Sacred Heart flanked by angels, the Blessed Sacrament, and a christogram. With the exception of the Sacred Heart window, the diocese replaced them in 1923 with new designs. These included depictions of the Last Supper, Christ and his disciples, the village Emmaus as mentioned in the New Testament, a monstrance and angels.

== Membership ==
Parish membership reached a total of 4,950 in 1928, but it steadily declined after a peak of 4,684 members in 1949. Membership fell to 3,000 by 1960; 1,500 by 1970; and 289 by 1984. In 2015, parish membership included 165 families.As of 2025, 134 families were registered in the parish.

The decline in membership was attributed to the deaths of longtime members, parish families moving to the suburbs, a declining neighborhood around the cathedral, and a general urban decline. In an effort to revitalize the cathedral parish, the archdiocese renovated the cathedral in 1985 and 1986.

== Ordinations ==
Chartrand was ordained a priest at Saints Peter & Paul Chapel on September 24, 1892. He was appointed as rector of the new cathedral on December 26, 1905, and named coadjutor bishop and Chatard's successor on June 27, 1910. Chartrand governed the diocese on the bishop's behalf until Chatard's death on September 7, 1918. Chartrand was consecrated as bishop of Indianapolis at the cathedral on September 15, 1910.

Reverend Joseph Elmer Ritter was named rector of the cathedral on August 25, 1925. He was consecrated auxiliary bishop of Indianapolis at the cathedral in 1933, and was appointed bishop of Indianapolis on March 26, 1934. When the diocese was elevated to an archdiocese on November 17, 1944, Ritter became its archbishop.

Chatard and Chartrand were initially buried in the cathedral's crypt. In 1976, their remains were removed and interred at the Calvary Cemetery's mausoleum chapel in Indianapolis.

== See also ==
- List of churches in the Roman Catholic Archdiocese of Indianapolis
- List of Catholic cathedrals in the United States
- List of cathedrals in the United States
