= Church of the Immaculate Conception (Saint Mary-of-the-Woods, Indiana) =

American church

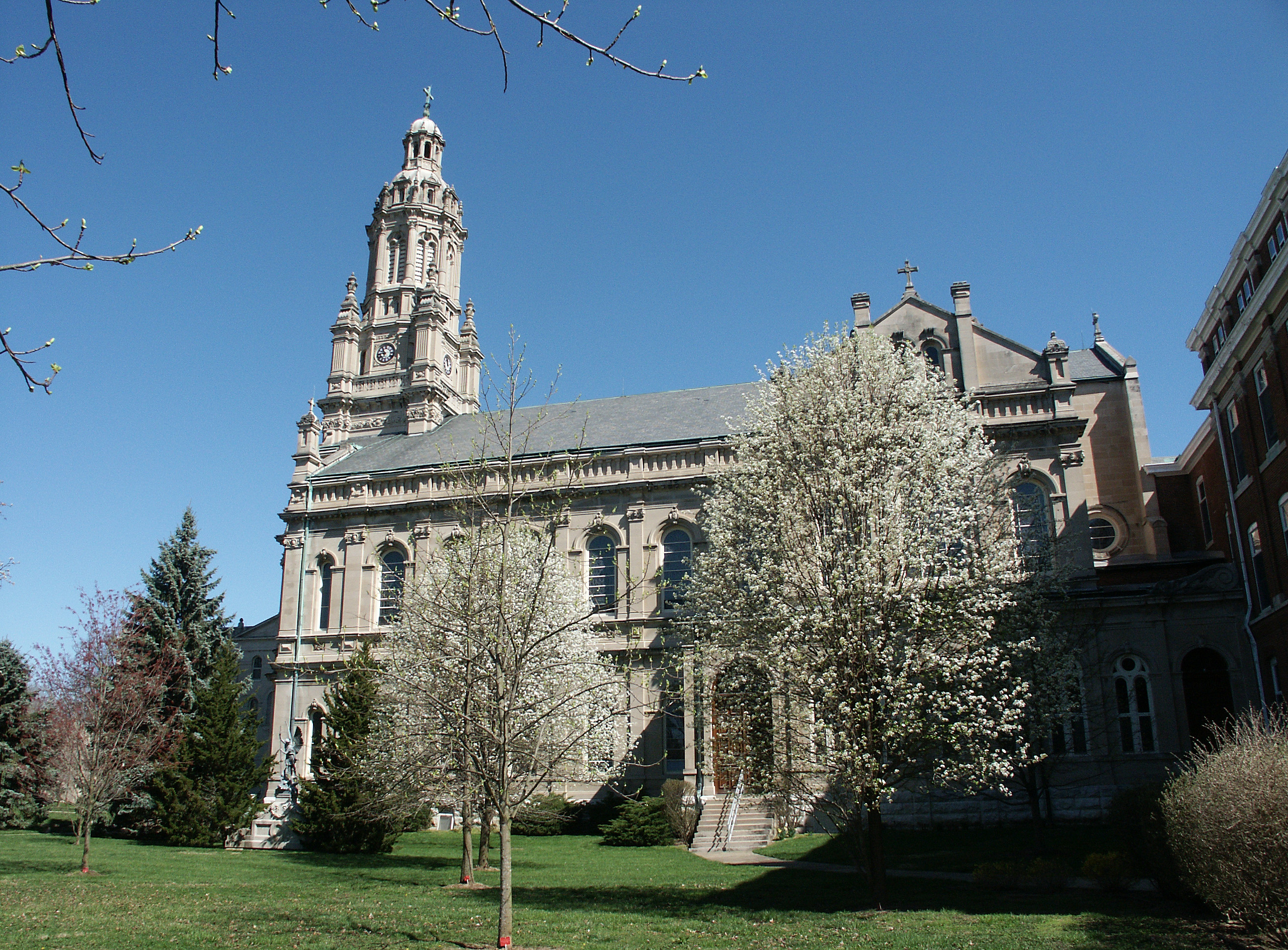

- The Church's location in Vigo County, Indiana

Religion
- Affiliation: Roman Catholic Church
- Diocese: Roman Catholic Archdiocese of Indianapolis
- Ecclesiastical or organisational status: Chapel for the Sisters of Providence of Saint Mary-of-the-Woods
- Year consecrated: 1907
- Status: active

Location
- Location: Saint Mary-of-the-Woods, Indiana; United States
- State: Indiana
- Coordinates: 39.5106°N 87.4606°W

Architecture
- Architects: D. A. Bohlen and Son, Indianapolis
- Type: Chapel
- Style: Classical revival
- Groundbreaking: 1886
- Completed: 1907

Specifications
- Direction of façade: West
- Length: 154 feet (47 m)
- Width: 72 feet (22 m)
- Width (nave): 90 feet (27 m)
- Spire: 1
- Materials: Indiana limestone

Website
- http://www.spsmw.org

The Church of the Immaculate Conception on the motherhouse grounds of the Sisters of Providence of Saint Mary-of-the-Woods is a large Italian Renaissance Revival-style church constructed of Indiana limestone at Saint Mary-of-the-Woods, Indiana. The cathedral-like structure, which is the fourth church/chapel of the Sisters of Providence since their arrival at Saint Mary-of-the-Woods in 1840. Construction for the church began in 1886; its exterior was completed in 1891 and the interior was completed in 1907. The church was consecrated on October 23, 1907, and continues to serve as a place of daily worship services that are open to the public. The church also houses the shrine and tomb of Saint Mother Théodore Guérin, foundress of the Sisters of Providence of Saint Mary-of-the-Woods. Our Lady of Sorrows Chapel (1905) was erected in the crypt beneath the church.

The church's interior was renovated in 1986, but the sanctuary retains much of its early decoration, including Georgian marble columns, Numidian marble walls, a semi-dome ceiling, Stations of the Cross, stained glass windows, religious paintings by Tadeusz Żukotyński, a sculpture by Harry Breen, and other works of art. Its Casavant Frères pipe organ dates from 1953. Carrara marble from the reredos (high altar) was used to create an altar, lectern, and a presider's chair in 1986.

== History ==
When the Sisters of Providence of Saint Mary-of-the-Woods arrived in Saint Mary-of-the-Woods, Indiana in 1840, there was no church on the site, and a log cabin served as its first chapel. Saint Mother Théodore Guérin, the foundress of the order, described the primitive chapel to friends in France, "The Church! Yes, dear friends, that is the dwelling of the God of the Universe, in comparison with which the stables wherein you shelter your cattle are palaces!" The log chapel was dismantled in 1853. The second chapel, a room in the new Providence motherhouse (1853), served the Sisters of Providence until 1863, when a simple frame chapel designed by Indianapolis architect Diedrich A. Bohlen was completed. Although Bohlen's frame chapel was large, capable of seating 300 people, it was only intended to be a temporary structure until a more substantial church could be erected at Saint Mary-of-the-Woods.

From the time of her arrival at Saint Mary-of-the-Woods, Saint Mother Guérin hoped to establish a new church to honor the Immaculate Conception. Prior to her death in 1856, she began to gather materials to use in its construction, but the church was not built during her lifetime. The Italian Renaissance Revival-style structure is the fourth church/chapel of the Sisters of Providence of Saint Mary-of-the-Woods since 1840. It serves as the focal point for daily worship and devotion at Saint Mary-of-the-Woods. Other nearby places for prayer include the Saint Anne Shell Chapel (1876), the Blessed Sacrament Chapel (1924), and Our Lady of Providence Shrine (1990) in Providence Center, among others.

Diedrich A. Bohlen, founder of the architectural firm of D.A. Bohlen and Son of Indianapolis, Indiana, designed the Indiana limestone church. Construction began in 1886, under the leadership of general superior Mother Euphrasie Hinkle. Its cornerstone was laid the same year. Although a fire destroyed the Providence motherhouse in 1889, the church, which was already under construction, was damaged but not destroyed. Noted architect Oscar D. Bohlen continued work on the project after his father, Diedrich, died in 1890. The church's exterior was completed in 1891; however, it took sixteen additional years before the interior was fully furnished. By June 1892 the plasterwork was completed and installation of temporary wooden flooring, seats, and altars permitted the sisters to worship in the unfinished church. An organ from William Schuelke Church Organ Builder of Milwaukee, Wisconsin, was purchased in 1902; it was later replaced.

"By 1902, the General Council, under the leadership of General Superior Mother Mary Cleophas Foley, focused its attention on the interior decoration of the church." Mother Mary Cleophas and General Councilor Sister Mary Alma Ryan, who traveled to Europe to visit numerous churches and gather ideas, were inspired by the Basilica of Sant'Apollinare Nuovo in Ravenna, Italy, and the Cathedral Church of the Holy Trinity, Paris, among others. Soon after the two sisters returned to Saint Mary-of-the-Woods, artisans and craftsmen were employed to decorate the church's interior. The completed church was consecrated on October 23, 1907, in a celebration attended by religious dignitaries, including Francis Silas Chatard, Bishop of the Diocese of Indianapolis.

Under the leadership of General Superiors Sister Anne Doherty and Sister Nancy Nolan, the church's interior was renovated in 1986 to conform with liturgical changed that were adopted after the Second Vatican Council and to strengthen the church's floor joists. Melvin B. G. Meyer, principal architect at Bohlen, Meyer, Gibson and Associates, served as the project architect.

== Architecture ==
The Church of the Immaculate Conception is constructed of Indiana limestone and designed in the Italian Renaissance Revival style.

=== Exterior and plan ===
Following the general trends of Cathedral architecture of Western Europe, the church at Saint Mary-of-the-Woods has a basic cruciform architectural plan with a nave intersecting its transept. Although the church slightly varying from absolute coordinates, it is generally oriented along an east/west axis. A tall bell tower provide vertical emphasis on the west side of the church's front façade. Architect Oscar D. Bohlen explained that the church was designed in an "Italian Renaissance style with a French sentiment." Our Lady of Sorrows Chapel was erected in 1905 in the crypt beneath the church.

=== Interior ===
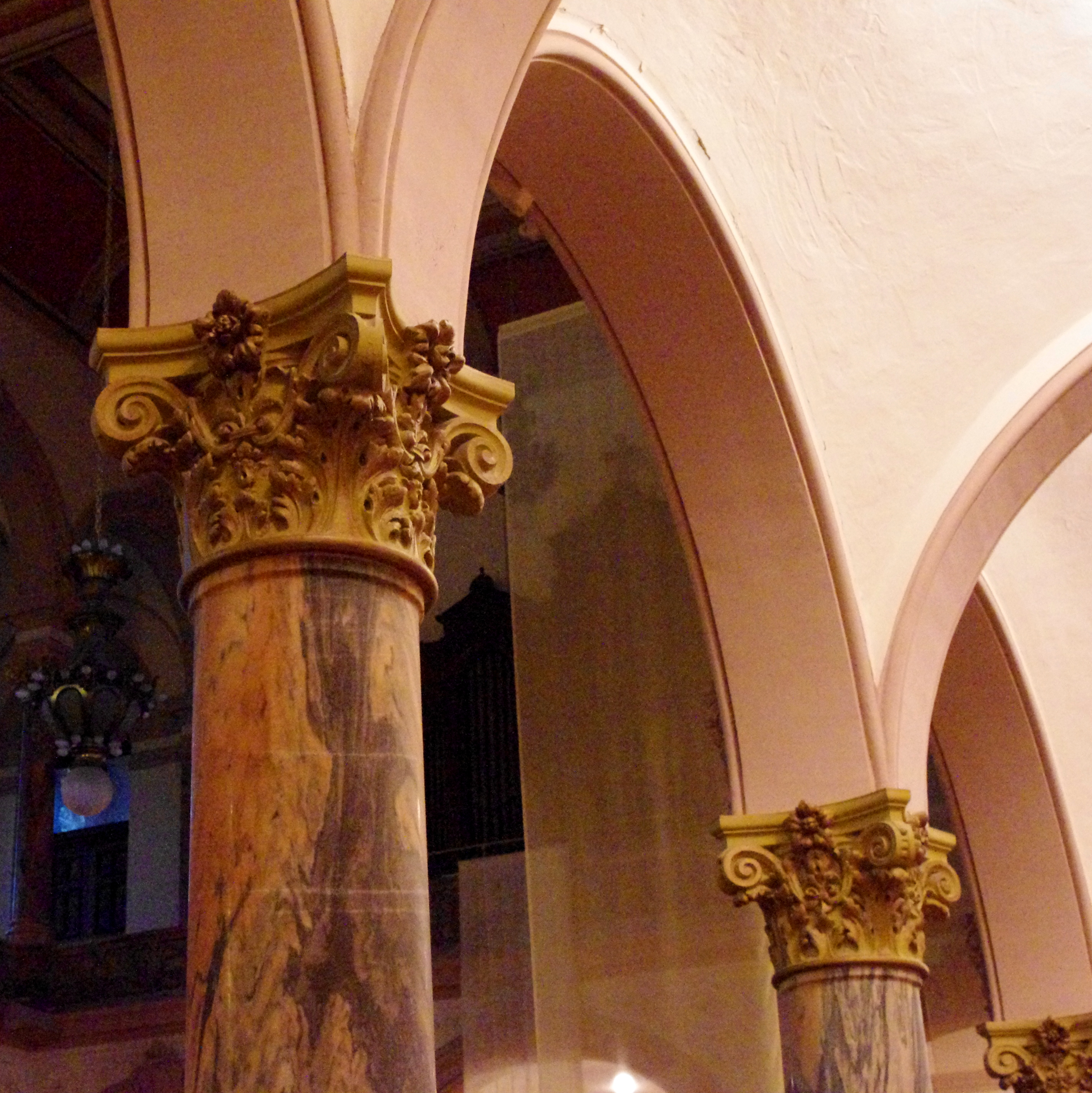
Composite order columns in the church.

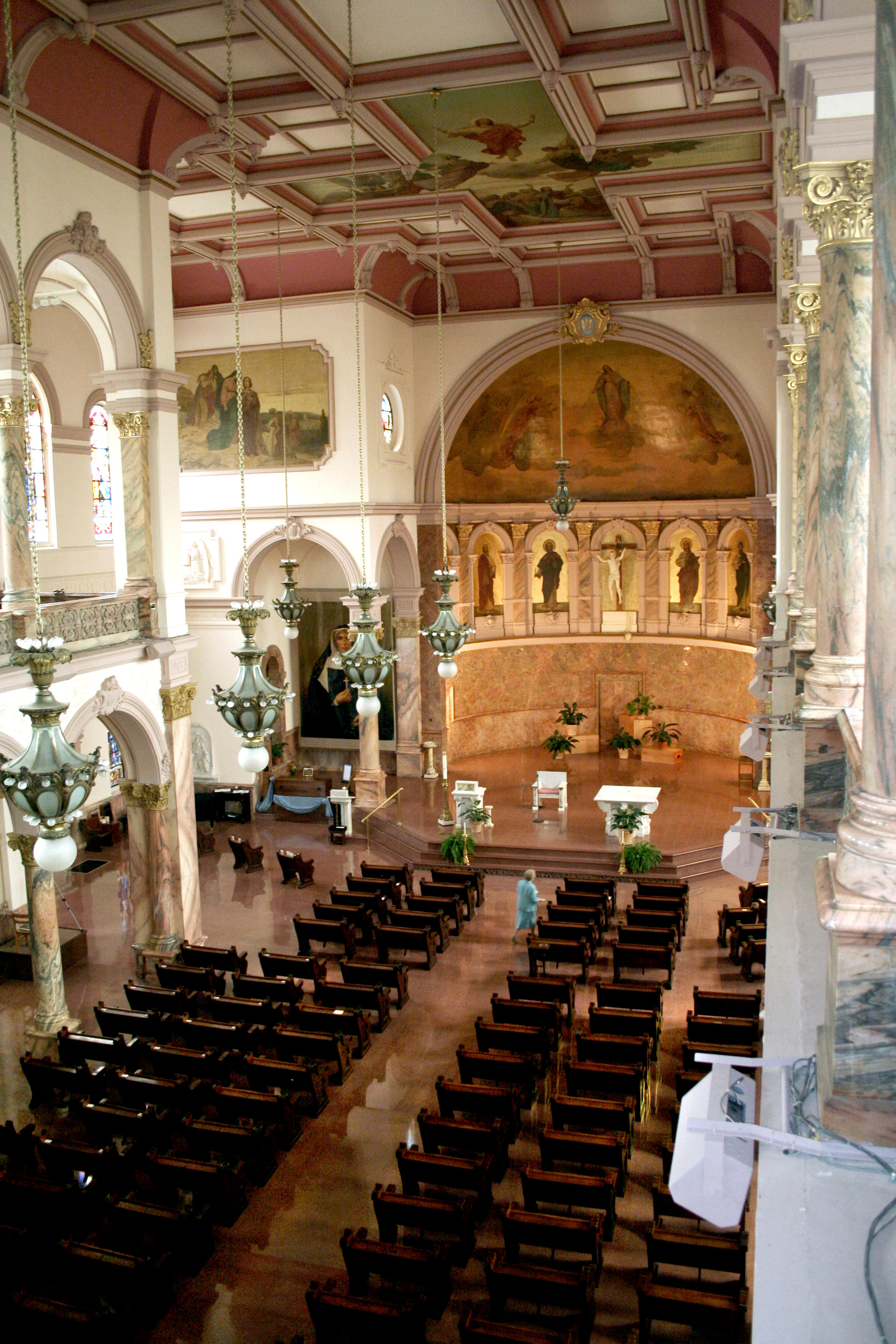
The interior of the Church of the Immaculate Conception.

The church's interior includes a high-ceiling nave flanked by two aisles with lower ceilings. Original pink Georgian marble columns in the composite order flank the nave. The sanctuary also includes red Numidian marble walls and a semi-dome ceiling. The varied types of marble that decorate the church come from Italy, Africa, Skyros, Greece and the United States.

The original flooring was Venetian marble; it was replaced with a speckled maroon and black terrazzo floor as part of the renovations made in 1986; the church's walls and ceiling were painted mauve, pink, and alabaster. The original reredos (high altar) has been removed, but the sanctuary still contains religious artifacts, paintings, sculptures, stained glass windows, and other works of art.

== Interior artwork ==
=== Stained glass windows ===
The Bavarian Art Institute of Munich, Germany created the church's stained glass windows. They depict events from the life of Christ, Mary (mother of Jesus), and Old Testament figures. Windows in the upper balcony display scenes of angels.

=== Stations of the Cross ===
The Stations of the Cross underneath the gallery and around the back of the church are made of alabaster. They were created by the Mayer and Company of Munich and London at a cost of $1,800 and installed around 1891.

=== Paintings ===
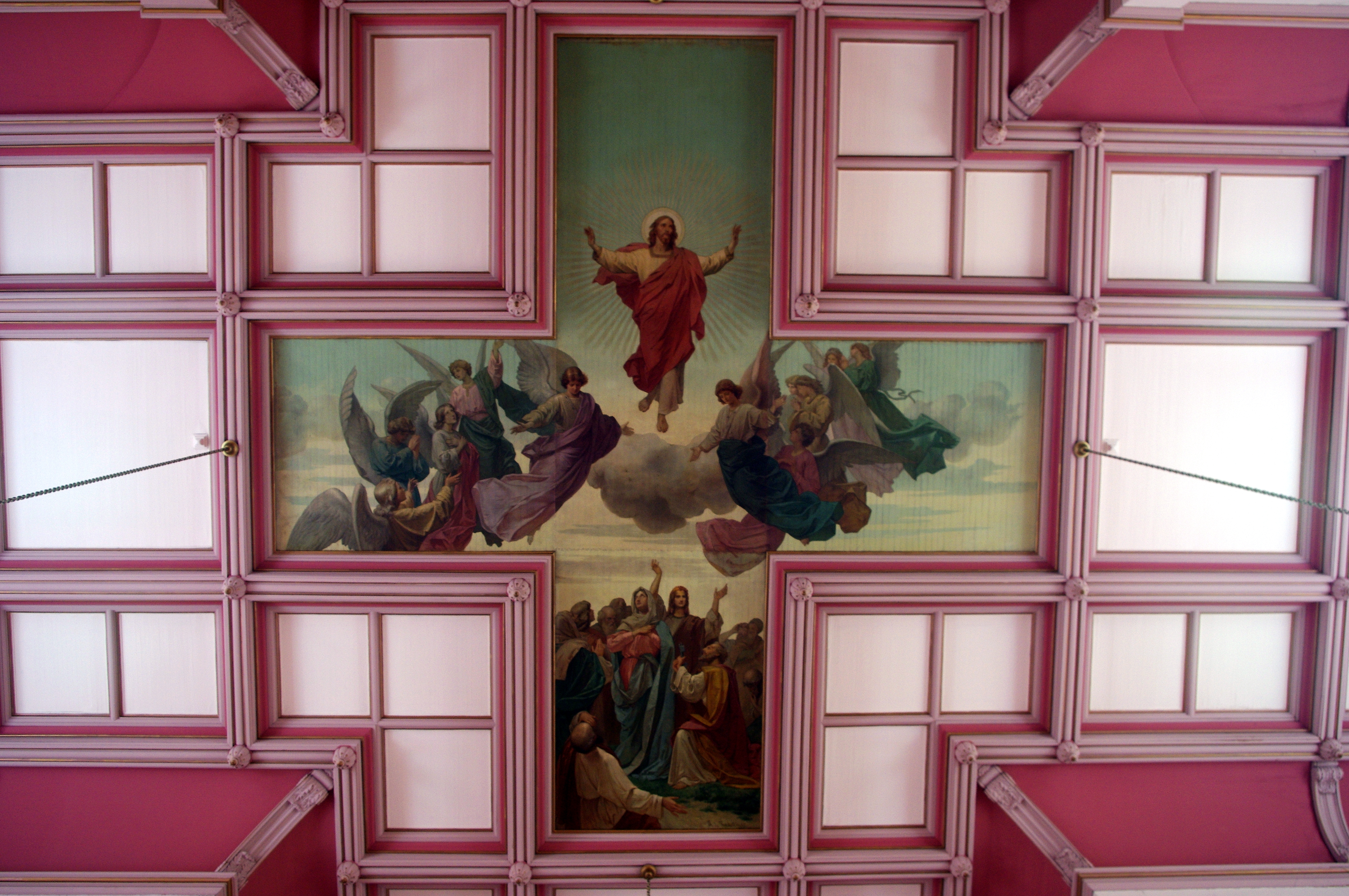
"The Ascension" mural painted on the church ceiling at the crossing.

Tadeusz Żukotyński (Thaddeus von Zukotynski) of Munich and Chicago painted three murals in addition to the sanctuary's semi-dome fresco. The east and west transepts and the arcade beneath the dome include Żukotyński's of the Four Evangelists, the "Return from Calvary," and the "Flight into Egypt." The semi-dome fresco took Żukotyński three months to complete. It represents the Immaculate Conception of the Blessed Virgin Mary. She stands on a globe supported by clouds with Saint Michael and Saint Gabriel on either side. "The Ascension" painting in the ceiling coffer at the intersection of the nave and transept depicts Christ ascending into heaven In 1906, while Żukotyński painted the religious figures, the Sisters of Providence hired George Hepfinger of Chicago to do the decorating and painting in the remainder of the church.

=== Altar furniture ===
The church renovation in 1986 included removal of a reredos (high altar) made by the Deprato Studio of Chicago. It had been installed in the sanctuary in 1906. The Carrara marble from the reredos was used to create a new altar, a lectern, and a presider's chair as part of the renovations made in 1986.

=== Sculpture ===
Removal of the reredos opened a space in the center wall of the sanctuary for a sculpture by Harry Breen of Champaign, Illinois. It depicts a Christ figure ascending from the Crucifix.

A Carrara marble statue in one of the church's alcoves depicts the Blessed Virgin Mary. It is placed in front of a shrine that contains the tomb of Saint Mother Théodore Guérin, foundress of the Sisters of Providence of Saint-Mary-of-the-Woods. Another alcove contains a statue of Saint Joseph and a tablet that marks the relics of Saint Theodore, Saint Urbin, and other holy men and women.

Bas relief sculptures on either side of the sanctuary depict religious scenes. On the right, the Blessed Virgin gives a rosary to Saint Dominic, while the infant Jesus presents a chaplet to Saint Catherine of Siena. The bas relief scene on the left depicts Saint Anne and Saint Joachim with the little Mary.

== Music ==
=== Pipe organ ===
In the upper balcony at the west front of the church is a rare pipe organ made by the Casavant Frères Company of Canada and installed in 1953. With approximately 1,700 pipes, it is the third organ that has been used in the church. For its dedication on December 8, 1953, the Sisters of Providence held a brief organ recital featuring Sister of Providence organist and composer Sister Cecilia Clare Bocard, who played her musical composition, "Te Deum Laudamus". The organ was renovated in 1999.

=== Bells ===
In the bell tower at the west front is a set of chimes. Made by the McShane Bell Foundry of Maryland, the eleven bells placed in the tower in 1910 have a combined weight of 13,150 pounds (5,960 kg). Originally, the bells were rung by hand to wake the Sisters of Providence, to call them to prayer, and to let them known when to retire. In addition, hymns were played on the set on Sundays, holidays, and feast days. The bells still are rung each hour and toll for deceased Sisters of Providence. The Sisters also ring the bells each time someone is executed by capital punishment in the United States. In November 2004, Schulmerich Carillons installed a Generation 4 Novabell DSP cast bell controller which activates the bells. The bells, chimes and tolls are either programmed into the system or they may be controlled manually.

== Services ==
Worship services are open to the public. Hours of worship are 11 a.m. on Sunday; Monday through Saturday at 11:30 a.m. (Exceptions: funeral Masses, special feasts, and holy days).
