= Bohlen, Meyer, Gibson and Associates =

American architectural firm

Bohlen, Meyer, Gibson and Associates (BMG)
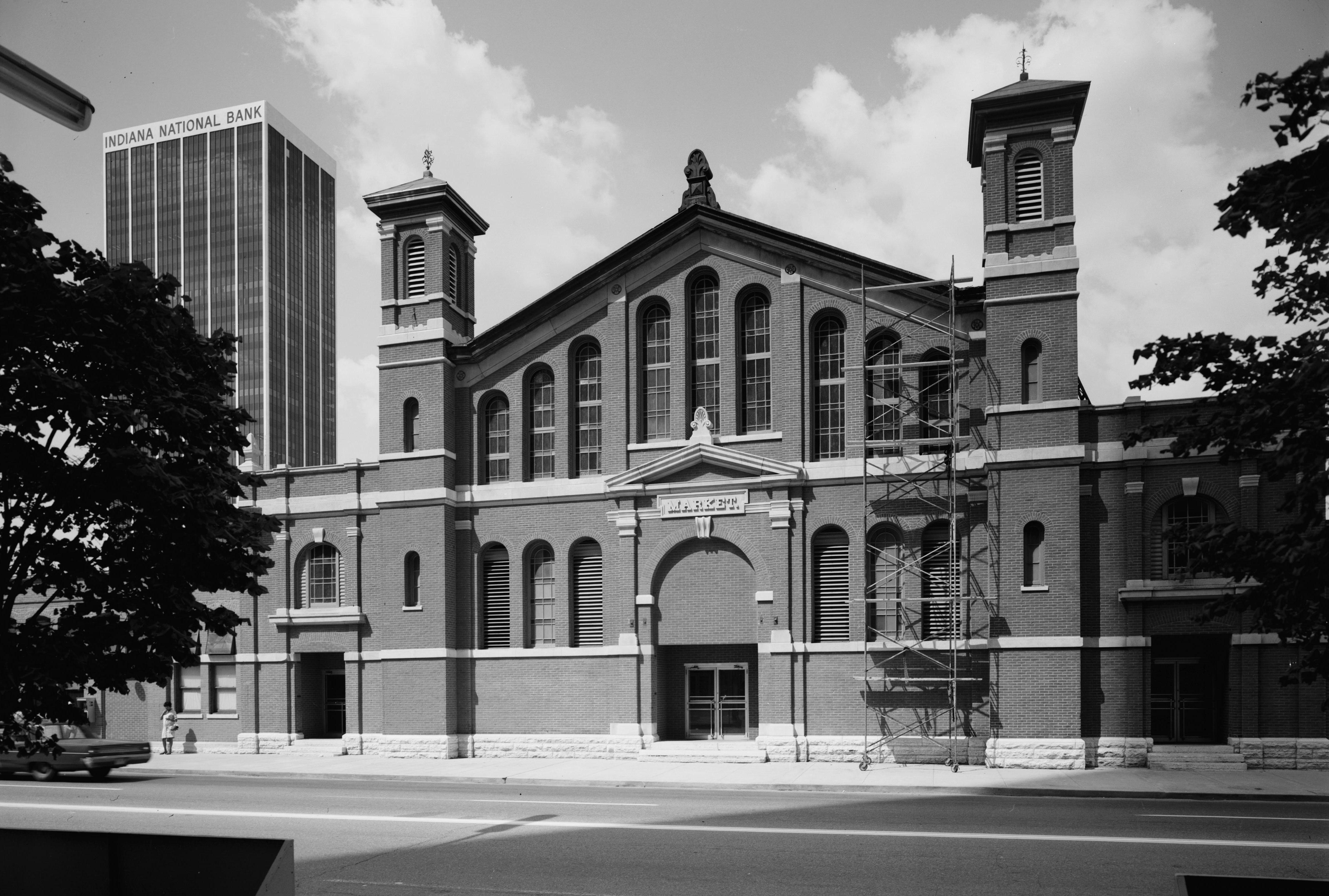
- Indianapolis City Market

Practice information
- Founded: 1853 (as D. A. Bohlen, Architect)
- Location: Indianapolis, Indiana

Bohlen, Meyer, Gibson and Associates, or BMG, is an architectural firm based in Indianapolis, Indiana. It was founded in Indianapolis on April 10, 1853, as D. A. Bohlen, Architect by Diedrich A. Bohlen, German immigrant. In 1884, after Diedrich's son, Oscar D. Bohlen, joined the firm it was renamed D. A. Bohlen and Son. Four successive generations of Bohlen architects have worked at the firm: Diedrich A. Bohlen (its founder), Oscar D. Bohlen (Diedrich's son), August C. Bohlen (Diedrich's grandson), and Robert L. Bohlen (Diedrich's great-grandson). The firm specialized in institutional projects, especially civic, religious, and educational buildings. In 1971 Melvin B. G. Meyer acquired majority interest in the firm, which adopted its name in reference to its founder and its two principal architects, Meyer and John M. Gibson. The architectural firm is among the oldest still operating in the United States. More than twenty of its projects are listed on the National Register of Historic Places.

== History ==
Diedrich A. Bohlen, a native of Cadenberge, Kingdom of Hanover, immigrated to the United States around 1851, and founded D. A. Bohlen, Architect, on April 10, 1853, at Indianapolis, Indiana. Bohlen is credited for introducing the German Neo-Gothic style to Indiana. The designs for several of his buildings, including the Indianapolis City Market façade (1886), exhibit the Romanesque Revival architecture style called Rundbogenstil.

More than twenty of the Bohlen firm's projects are listed on the National Register of Historic Places, including Morris-Butler House (1864), Indianapolis; Foley Hall (1860, 1897), Saint Mary-of-the-Woods College; Saint John the Evangelist Catholic Church (1871), rectory (1863) and bishop's residence (1878), Indianapolis; Roberts Park Methodist Church (1876), Indianapolis; Crown Hill Cemetery's Gothic Chapel (1877); Indianapolis City Market (1886); Indianapolis's Majestic Building (1896); and the Indianapolis Fire Department headquarters (1913) and municipal garage (1913), among others.

Bohlen's firm is among the oldest architectural firms still operating in the United States. Four successive generation of Bohlen architects have worked at the Indianapolis firm. Diedrich Augustus Bohlen founded the firm in 1853. Oscar Diedrich Bohlen, D. A.'s son, joined the firm around 1882, and became a partner in 1884. August Carl Bohlen, Oscar's son, joined the firm in 1910, and later co-authored Indiana's original building codes. Robert Lesh Bohlen, August's son, joined the firm in 1946.

D. A. Bohlen, Architect, went through several name and ownership changes after Bohlen's descendants, new partners, and associates joined the firm. In 1876 Matthew Roth became D. A. Bohlen's business partner, and for a few years the firm was named Bohlen and Roth. In 1884, after Bohlen's son, Oscar, joined the firm, its name was changed to D. A. Bohlen and Son, Architects. Following D. A. Bohlen's death on June 1, 1890, Oscar continued the family firm on his own until 1910, except for the period between 1897 and 1899, when Hugo Zigrosser was his partner. After Oscar's death in 1936, his son, August, who joined the firm in 1910, and August's son, Robert, continued the family's presence at the architectural firm until the mid-twentieth century. Following Robert's death in 1960, August Bohlen entered into a partnership with David V. Burns.

The firm was renamed Bohlen and Burns Architects in 1961, and incorporated as Bohlen, Burns and Associates in 1967. With August's retirement in 1970, ownership passed from the Bohlen family to Melvin B.G. Meyer and John M. Gibson, the firm's main architects, and Noel Cord, the firm's accountant. Meyer, who joined firm in 1946 as a draftsman, served as its main designer from 1948 to 1990. In 1971 Meyer acquired majority interest in the firm, which adopted the name, Bohlen, Meyer, Gibson and Associates, Inc. in reference to its founder, D. A. Bohlen, and its two principal architects, Meyer and Gibson. Mike Rogers and Hans Megerling, also architects in the firm, replaced Cord as investors in the firm in 1980. Following Meyer's retirement from the firm in 1990, Mr. and Mrs. John V. Schneider of the Schneider Corporation purchased the architectural firm. Although the firm's original location in Indianapolis is not known, its offices were housed in several downtown locations, before moving to more suburban locations, including the Meadows Office Complex (1970–78), Castleton, (1978–91), and North Post Road, (1991– ).

== Major clients and projects ==
The firm specialized in institutional structures for religious, educational, and civic institutions, although it did design some private residences for well-do-to families, such as the French mansard-style Morris-Butler House (1864) in Indianapolis and the Neo-Jacobean-style Churchman House (1871) on a farm that later became part of Beech Grove, Indiana. The firm did not enter the multi-family housing market until 1993.

Most of the Bohlen firm's early projects were in the Indianapolis area. Notable exceptions include the French Lick Springs Hotel (1898), designed by Oscar Bohlen, in French Lick, Indiana, and numerous buildings for the Sisters of Providence of Saint Mary-of-the-Woods at Saint Mary-of-the-Woods, Indiana. The firm's architects also designed Oldenburg Convent (1899), Oldenburg Academy (1898), and other buildings for the Sisters of Saint Francis at Oldenburg, Indiana, as well as buildings at The Carmel of Saint Joseph, a Carmelite monastery in Allendale, Indiana.

In 1891 Bohlen's firm submitted a design for a proposed Indiana building to be erected at the World's Columbian Exposition (1893) at Chicago. The selection committee narrowed its choice to two plans, one from the Bohlen firm and the other from Wing and Mahurin of Fort Wayne, Indiana. In a controversial move from the committee's leadership, a design proposed by Chicago architect Henry Ives Cobb was recommended to the Indiana Board of World's Fair Managers and built for the exposition, despite protests from the Indiana architects who argued that Cobb's plan arrived after the contest deadline. Although the Bohlen firm did not receive this prestigious commission, it designed other projects built outside of Indiana at Cleveland, Ohio; Dayton, Ohio; Detroit, Michigan; Grand Rapids, Michigan; and Saint Louis, Missouri.

=== Sisters of Providence projects ===
One of the firm's earliest and long-standing clients was the Sisters of Providence of Saint Mary-of-the-Woods. D. A. Bohlen established a relationship with the Sisters of Providence in the 1850s that continued over several decades. Boheln's firm completed "more than sixty projects" for the Sisters.

Providence motherhouse and chapel (1853–4, 1863), Foley Hall (1860), and the Church of the Immaculate Conception (1892) are among Diedrich Bohlen's early renovations and designs for the Sisters of Providence on the grounds of Saint Mary-of-the-Woods College, a Roman Catholic liberal arts college near Terre Haute, Indiana. A fire destroyed the motherhouse in 1889, and Foley Hall has been demolished, but the Church of the Immaculate Conception is still in use. Construction on the Church of the Immaculate Conception began in 1886. After D. A. Bohlen's death in 1890, Oscar continued his father's legacy as community architect at Saint Mary-of-the-Woods. The church's interior decoration was completed in 1907, and it underwent a major renovation in 1987, with Melvin Meyer as the project architect.

The Bohlen firm designed several additional buildings for Sisters of Providence, including an addition to Foley Hall (1897), a new novitiate (1904), Guerin Hall (1913), Saint Cecilia Conservatory of Music (1913), Le Fer Hall (1924), and Blessed Sacrament Chapel (1924). Robert Bohlen, the last of D. A. Bohlen's descendants to design a building for the Sisters of Providence, designed Owens Hall (1960). The firm's president, Melvin B. G. Meyer, designed a new library and chapel in the Providence motherhouse and Providence Center.

=== Indianapolis projects ===
Many of the firm's most notable religious, civic, commercial, and residential buildings were erected in Indianapolis. These include buildings designed by the firm's founder, D. A. Bohlen, his descendants, and Melvin B. G. Meyer.

Bohlen's early commissions in the city included the Charles Mayer store façade (1853), the dome for Odd Fellows Grand Lodge (1854), and the Metropolitan (1858), the city's first theater. Indianapolis's German community was another source of early commissions for the firm. D. A. Bohlen was the architect for the city's German-English Independent School (1860) on Maryland Street and the General German Protestant Orphans' Home (1872), later known as Pleasant Run Children's Home, on South State Avenue.

The firm designed several of Indianapolis's notable churches and cemetery structures. D. A. Bohlen designed the United Evangelical Zion Church (1866) on West Ohio Street; his firm also designed its replacement, Zion United Church of Christ (1913), at North and New Jersey Streets. D. A. Bohlen designed Crown Hill Cemetery's Gothic Chapel (1875), and his firm designed an addition to the structure in 1917. Crown Hill's Community Mausoleum, designed by the Bohlen firm, was completed in the early 1950s. In 1960 the firm drew up plans for the cemetery's first garden crypts.

D. A. Bohlen also designed Saint John the Evangelist Catholic Church (1871), the main structure in a cluster of parish buildings on the southwest corner of Georgia Street and Capitol Avenue in Indianapolis that includes a D. A. Bohlen-designed rectory (1863) and bishop's residence (1878). D. A. Bohlen's son, Oscar, designed the twin spires on the two towers that flank the church's main façade and supervised their construction in 1893. Other D. A. Bohlen-designed buildings for the parish include Saint Johns School for Boys (1867), across the alley from the rectory, and the Saint Johns Academy for Girls (1874), on nearby Maryland Street. Both of these buildings were later demolished.

Other notable churches designed by D. A. Bohlen include the Romanesque Revival-style Roberts Park Methodist Church (1876) at Delaware and Vermont Streets; Emmanuel Church (1883), later renamed Lockerbie Square United Methodist Church, at East and New York Streets; and Saint Paul's Evangelical Lutheran Church (1883) at McCarty and New Jersey Streets. Oscar Bohlen designed Assumption Catholic Church (1894). Built in West Indianapolis, a city suburb at that time, it is the oldest frame Catholic church in the city in continuous use. Also known as Saint Mary of the Assumption Roman Catholic Church, it was later named Saint Athanasius the Great Byzantine-Ruthenian Catholic Church. Oscar also designed the parish's original school building (1895).

Numerous commercial and several notable civic structures were designed in Indianapolis during Oscar Bohlen's tenure at the firm. D. A. and Oscar Bohlen collaborated on the Indianapolis City Market (1886), still in operation, and Tomlinson Hall (1886), adjacent to the City Market at the corner of Delaware and Market Streets. Tomlinson Hall was destroyed by fire in 1958. Oscar Bohlen's most notable commercial structure was the Majestic Building (1896), a commission from the Indiana Gas Company, at 47 South Pennsylvania Street. The ten-story, steel-skeleton building became the city's first skyscraper. Oscar also designed the Indiana National Bank building (1897), a Neoclassical structure at Three Virginia Avenue. Demolished in 1971, it was among the first fireproof building in Indiana. Oscar's son, August, designed a six-floor addition to the bank's adjacent building.

August Bohlen designed the Stokely Brothers office building (1912) and the Indianapolis Star-News building (1924); however, August and Robert Bohlen's most notable design was the Art Deco-style Empire Life and Accident Insurance Company building (1950). It later became known as the Lilly Endowment building. The firm's other major projects in Indianapolis during the early twentieth century included the Oscar Bohlen-designed Murat Temple (1910) at Massachusetts Avenue and New Jersey and Michigan Streets. He also designed an addition to Indianapolis Union Station (1903) and the Pennway (1909) and Big Four (1929) buildings.

The Bohlen firm designed several buildings for Indianapolis's Saint Vincent Hospital, Methodist Hospital, and Saint Francis Hospital, among others. In 1882 D. A. Bohlen remodeled a vacant seminary building on East Vermont Street for the Daughters of Charity of Saint Vincent de Paul to house Saint Vincent's Infirmary, predecessor to Indianapolis's Saint Vincent Hospital. Oscar Bohlen designed the hospital's second building (1889) on South and Delaware Streets, and after it was destroyed by fire in 1904, the Bohlen firm designed the third Saint Vincent Hospital (1913) building facing Fall Creek Parkway, between Capitol and Illinois Streets. Oscar also designed Methodist Hospital (1901) and Saint Francis Hospital (1903).

During the 1970s and 1980s the firm's Indianapolis clients included Indianapolis Newspapers, Inc.; Saint Vincent Hospital; Methodist Hospital; and the Indiana National Bank, in addition to the Indianapolis Fire Department, the Beveridge Paper Company, the University of Indianapolis (formerly Indiana Central University), and the Diamond Chain Company, among others. Melvin Meyer designed the executive offices for Indianapolis Newspapers, Inc.; the Krannert Pavilion and the Children's Pavilion at Methodist Hospital; the Krannert Library at the University of Indianapolis; and the Kiwanis International headquarters at Indianapolis.

== Notable structures ==
=== D. A. Bohlen, Architect ===
- Charles Mayer and Company store façade (1853), Indianapolis
- Odd Fellows Grand Lodge dome addition (1854), Indianapolis
- Metropolitan (1858), Indianapolis
- German-English Independent School (1860), Indianapolis
- Foley Hall (1860), Saint Mary-of-the-Woods, Indiana
- Providence motherhouse and chapel (1853–4, 1863), Saint Mary-of-the-Woods, Indiana
- Morris-Butler House (1864), Indianapolis
- Zion United Church of Christ (1866), Indianapolis
- Saint John the Evangelist Catholic Church (1871), rectory (1863), and bishop's residence (1878), Indianapolis
- Churchman House (1871), Beech Grove, Indiana
- General German Protestant Orphans Home (1872), later known as Pleasant Run Children's Home, Indianapolis
- Roberts Park Methodist Church (1876), Indianapolis
- Crown Hill Cemetery's Gothic Chapel (1877), Indianapolis
- Saint Paul's Evangelical Lutheran Church (1883), Indianapolis
- Emmanuel Church (1883), renamed Lockerbie Square United Methodist Church, Indianapolis

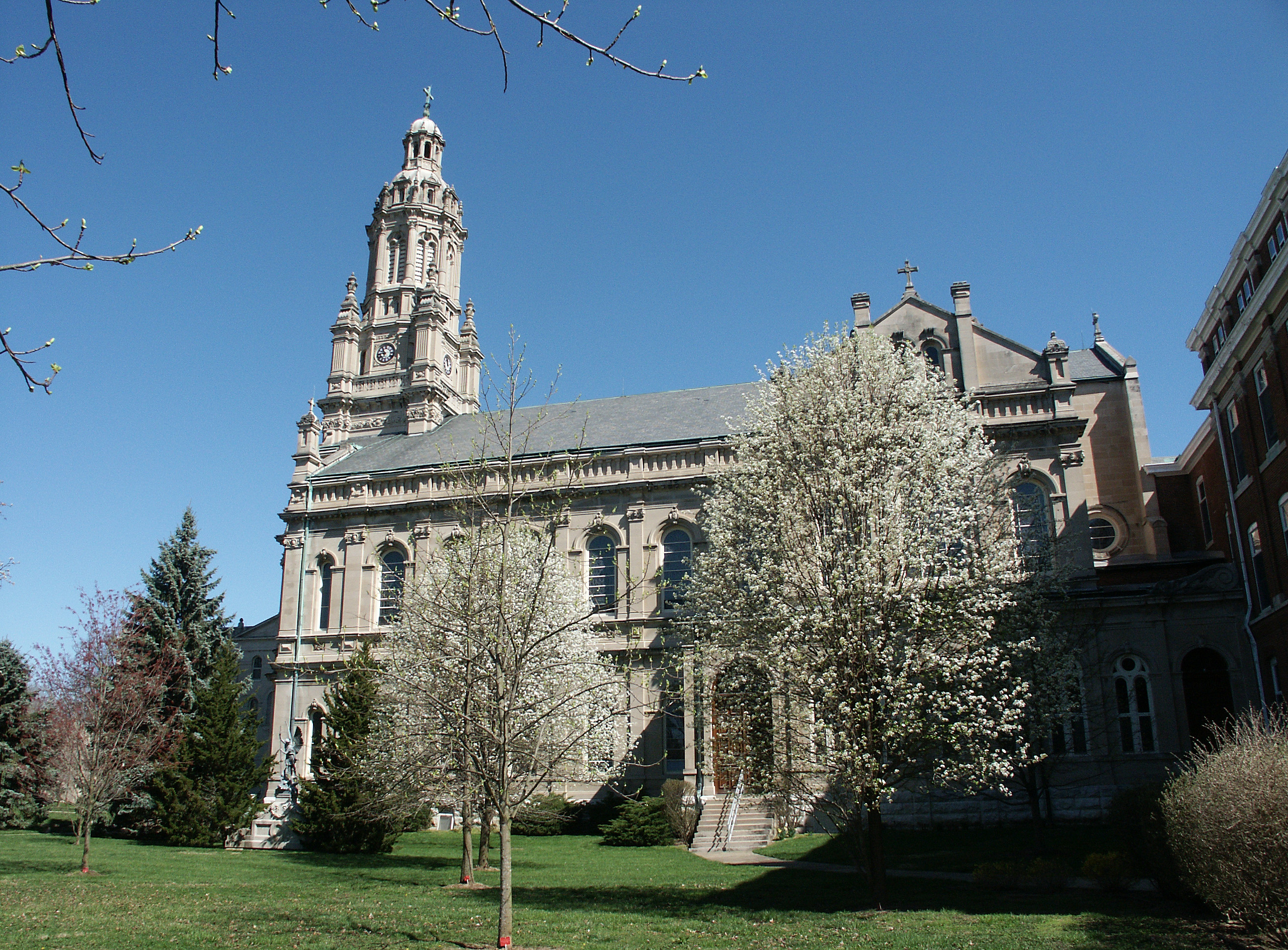
Church of the Immaculate Conception

=== D. A. Bohlen and Son ===
- Indianapolis City Market (1886)
- Tomlinson Hall (1886), Indianapolis
- Saint Vincent Hospital (1889, 1913), Indianapolis
- Providence motherhouse (1890), Saint Mary-of-the-Woods, Indiana
- Indiana Dental College (1893), Indianapolis
- Majestic Building (1896), Indianapolis
- Indiana National Bank building (1895)
- French Lick Springs Hotel (1898), French Lick, Indiana
- English Opera House/Theater and English Hotel (1898), Indianapolis
- Methodist Hospital of Indianapolis (1901)
- Saint Francis Hospital (1903), Indianapolis
- Indianapolis Union Station addition (1903)
- Church of the Immaculate Conception (1907), Saint Mary-of-the-Woods, Indiana
- Murat Temple (1910), Indianapolis
- Stokely Brothers office building (1912), Indianapolis
- Indianapolis Fire Department headquarters (1913) and municipal garage (1913)
- Indianapolis Star-News Building (1924)
- Blessed Sacrament Chapel (1924), Saint Mary-of-the-Woods, Indiana
- Marygrove College buildings (1925–27), including Madame Cadillac Hall and the Liberal Arts building, Detroit, Michigan
- Empire Life and Accident Insurance Company building (1950), later known as the Lilly Endowment headquarters, Indianapolis
