= Blessed Sacrament Chapel (Saint Mary-of-the-Woods, Indiana) =

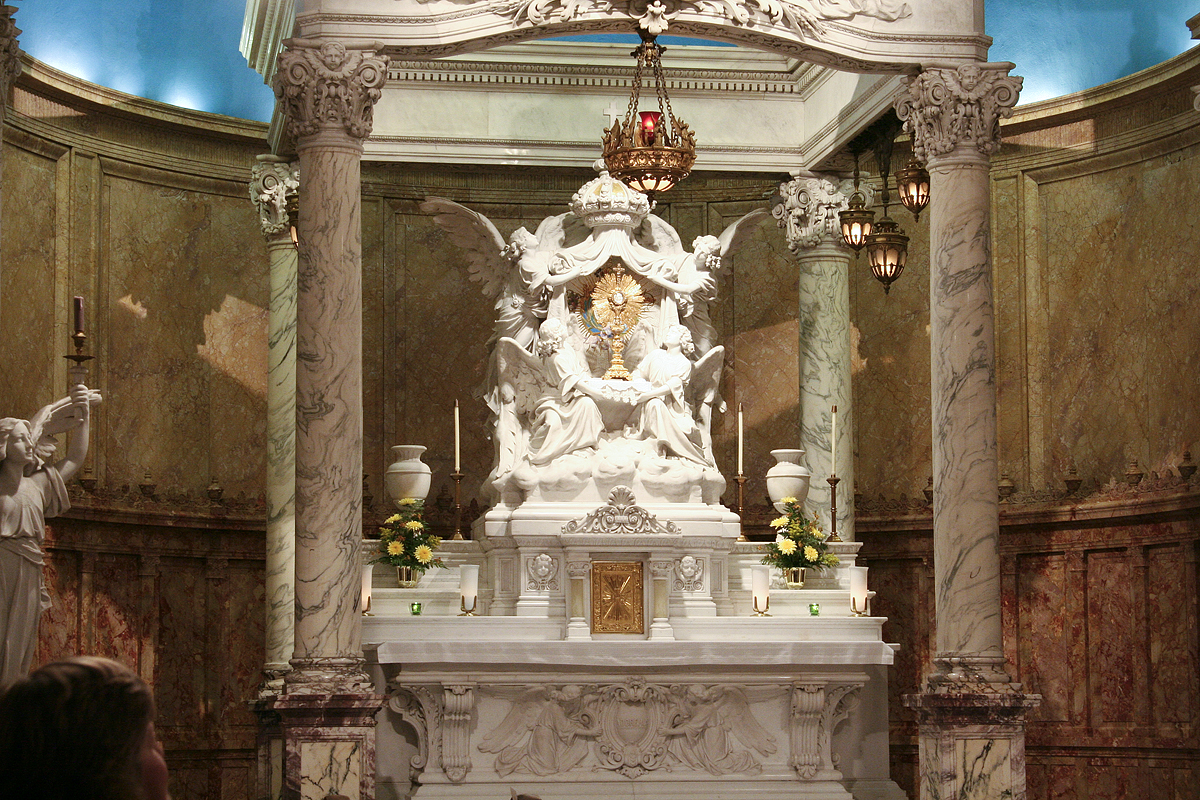

- Blessed Sacrament Chapel's location in Vigo County, Indiana

Religion
- Affiliation: Roman Catholic
- Diocese: Archdiocese of Indianapolis
- Ecclesiastical or organisational status: Chapel of Eucharistic adoration for the Sisters of Providence of Saint Mary-of-the-Woods
- Year consecrated: 1924
- Status: active

Location
- Location: Saint Mary-of-the-Woods, Indiana; United States
- State: Indiana
- Coordinates: 39.5109°N 87.4608°W

Architecture
- Architects: D.A. Bohlen and Son, Indianapolis
- Type: Chapel
- Style: Italian Renaissance, Classical revival
- Groundbreaking: April 9, 1920
- Completed: 1924

Website
- http://www.spsmw.org

The Blessed Sacrament Chapel at Saint Mary-of-the-Woods, Indiana is on the motherhouse grounds of the Sisters of Providence of Saint Mary-of-the-Woods. Its primary function is as a location for Eucharistic adoration by the Sisters of Providence and members of the public.

== History ==
Saint Mother Theodore Guerin, who came to Saint Mary-of-the-Woods, Indiana with several companions in 1840 and founded the Sisters of Providence, had a strong devotion to the Blessed Sacrament. In December 1913, Pope Pius X gave the sisters permission to hold perpetual Eucharistic adoration, which began at Saint Mary's in a different location on June 10, 1914. For decades the Sisters of Providence had wanted a specific Chapel of Perpetual Adoration, but this was not achieved until the 1920s under the leadership of General Superior Mother Mary Cleophas Foley.

Ground was broken on April 9, 1920, and the cornerstone was laid on June 7 of that year. The building was consecrated on May 19, 1924, by Bishop Joseph Chartrand of the Archdiocese of Indianapolis. He designated the chapel Chapel of Divine Love, though the sisters referred to it simply as the Blessed Sacrament Chapel.

== Interior and art ==
The chapel is built in the Italian Renaissance style with a barrel-vault ceiling. It was designed by D.A. Bohlen & Son of Indianapolis. Funded in large part through donations from the families and friends of Sisters of Providence, the chapel features multiple types of marble, gold, and silver.

The chapel's focal point is a Carrara marble baldachin. Carved from one piece of marble by the Deprato Company of Pietrasanta, Italy, the baldachin weighs 8,000 pounds.

Nine stained glass windows of Tiffany glass are found in the chapel: four on each side and one rose window of the Holy Spirit above the entrance. The windows were designed specifically for the space and were executed in the Royal Bavarian Studios in Munich, Germany. In order to encourage undivided attention on the Blessed Sacrament, no figures are pictured in the windows.

== See also ==
- List of churches in the Roman Catholic Archdiocese of Indianapolis
