= Sisters of Providence =

Sisters of Providence may refer to a number of congregations of Religious Sisters:

- Sisters of Providence (Montreal), founded in 1840 by Émilie Gamelin
- Sisters of Providence (Ruillé-sur-Loir, France), founded in 1806
- Sisters of Providence of Holyoke, founded in 1873 in Massachusetts as the first mission of the Sisters of Providence of St. Vincent de Paul
- Sisters of Providence of Saint Mary-of-the-Woods, founded in 1840 in Indiana by St. Mother Théodore Guérin
- Sisters of Providence of St. Vincent de Paul, founded in 1861, Kingston, Ontario, Canada
- Sisters of Providence of the Institute of Charity, founded in 1832 by Antonio Rosmini
- Sisters of Providence of Lisieux, founded in 1691 as a separate branch of the Sisters in Rouen by King Louis XIV
- Sisters of Providence of Rouen, later the Sisters of the Infant Jesus, founded in 1666 by Nicholas Barré
- Sisters of St. Ann of Providence, founded in 1834, Turin, Italy, by Carlo Tancredi Falletti and his wife Juliette Colbert]
- Congregation of Divine Providence, Mainz, founded in 1851 in Germany by Wilhelm Emmanuel von Ketteler
- Congregation of Divine Providence, Saint-Jean-de-Bassel, Lorraine, founded in 1762 by Jean-Martin Moye
- Daughters of Providence (Paris), 1651–1681
- Daughters of Providence, founded in 1818 in Brittany by Jean-Marie de Lamennais
- Oblate Sisters of Providence, founded in 1829, Baltimore, Maryland, first religious congregation composed of women of African descent
- Women of Providence in Collaboration, an association of congregations of Roman Catholic sisters
