= Gertrude Clare Owens =

Mother Gertrude Clare Owens, S.P.
- Born: Margaret Genevieve Haughan Owens; March 26, 1887; Chicago, Illinois
- Died: November 18, 1963 (aged 76); Saint Mary-of-the-Woods, Indiana
- Burial place: Sisters of Providence Convent Cemetery, Saint Mary-of-the-Woods, Indiana
- Title: General Superior of the Sisters of Providence of Saint Mary-of-the-Woods
- Predecessor: Mother Marie Helene Franey, S.P.
- Successor: Mother Rose Angela Horan, S.P.
- Parent(s): Michael Haughan and Margaret Tracey (step-father Michael Owens)

Mother Gertrude Clare Owens, S.P., (March 26, 1887 – November 18, 1963) was the Superior General of the Sisters of Providence of Saint Mary-of-the-Woods, Indiana, from 1954 to 1960. During her term, she established a sister-formation program to help develop new postulants and novices. She also built a new novitiate at Saint Mary-of-the-Woods, which was later named Owens Hall in her honor.

== Early life ==
The second child of Michael Haughan and Margaret Tracey, Margaret Genevieve Haughan was born in Chicago on March 26, 1887. Her father died when Genevieve was a child, and her mother's second husband, Michael Owens, adopted her and her siblings.

Genevieve was drawn to nursing and initially considered joining the Sisters of St. Joseph, who had a history of hospital ministry. However, an aunt suggested she join the Sisters of Providence and care for ill and elderly sisters in their infirmary instead. Genevieve entered the Sisters of Providence Congregation on September 7, 1904.

Taking the name Sister Gertrude Clare, she professed first vows on August 15, 1907, and became a fully professed Sister on August 15, 1916. On July 2, 1920, Owens was elected a Councilor of the Sisters of Providence. In this role, she managed the Sisters' Infirmary and later became in charge of several aspects of the novitiate, the training period for new sisters.

== As Superior General ==
On May 5, 1954, Owens was elected as Superior General of the Congregation and earned the name Mother Gertrude Clare. In this role, she completed the building of Marian Cottage, a shrine to Our Lady of Fatima dedicated to prior general superior Mother Marie Helene Franey, the expansion of Immaculata Junior College and High School in Washington, D.C., and an expansion of Schulte High School in Terre Haute, Indiana. As part of her duty to visit Sisters on mission, she sent Sisters in her place to Taiwan—then called Formosa—where no one from the Congregation had been able to visit for years, due to the global climate of World War II.

She also worked to improve the Sisters of Providence Infirmary. A portion of the fourth floor was in use as a convalescent area for tubercular patients but was no longer needed for that purpose, as the spread of tuberculosis had been halted by preventive medicines and more knowledge of treatment options. She converted this area into additional rooms for sister patients.

In accordance with her years spent leading meditations for postulants and novices, Owens laid the cornerstone for a new novitiate building on July 25, 1959. This building, not completed until after Owens' death, was later named Owens Hall in her honor under the leadership of then-Superior General Mother Mary Pius Regnier.

In February 1960, an illness sent Owens to the infirmary herself in a semi-coma state. Never fully recovering, she was unable to finish her term as superior. Owens died on November 18, 1963, and was buried on November 22, 1963, a date made more notable for the community due to the assassination of President John F. Kennedy that same day.

Catholic Church titles
| Preceded by Mother Marie Helene Franey, S.P. | General Superior of the Sisters of Providence of Saint Mary-of-the-Woods; 1954 - 1960 | Succeeded by Mother Rose Angela Horan, S.P. |
