= Ingleside, Holyoke, Massachusetts =

Ingleside
- Neighborhood of Holyoke
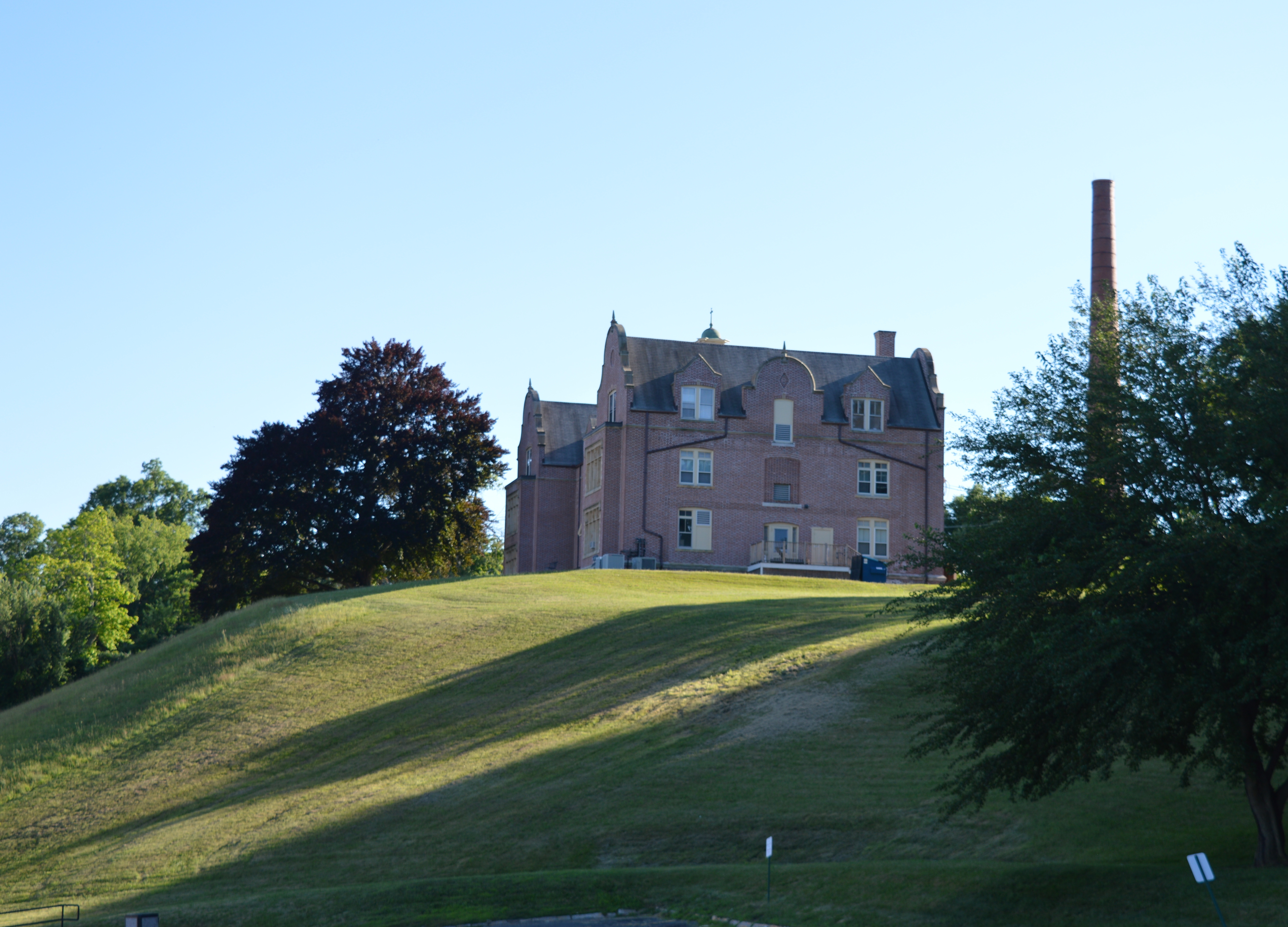
- McCleary Manor on Brightside Hill, Ingleside

- Location within Holyoke Location within Massachusetts Location within the United States
- Coordinates: 42°10′30.33″N 72°37′58.32″W
- Country: United States
- State: Massachusetts
- City: Holyoke
- Wards: 2, 5
- precincts: 2A, 5A

Area
  - Total: 0.69 sq mi (1.8 km^{2})
- Elevation: 161 ft (49 m)
- ZIP code: 01040
- Area code: 413
- GNIS feature ID: 608757

Ingleside is a neighborhood in Holyoke, Massachusetts located to the south of the city center, approximately 2 miles (3.2 km) from downtown. The neighborhood features access to the Connecticut River through the Sue Ellen Panitch River Center and the Land of Providence reservation. Ingleside is also home to the Holyoke Mall, the Nuestras Raices farm, the Sisters of Providence of Holyoke, the Providence Behavioral Health Hospital, and several recreational and historical venues.

While Ingleside holds the same ZIP code as the rest of Holyoke, it is served by its own post office, maintained at the Holyoke Mall.

== History ==
Prior to the annexation of Holyoke from West Springfield in 1850, Ingleside was the site of a ferry known as the Jones' ferry, its landing sites are known as Jones Ferry Road on both the Holyoke and Chicopee sides of the Connecticut River today.

The word ingle, stemming from a Gaelic word for fire, may have been chosen for lime kilns which were once in the vicinity in its time as a part of West Springfield. The origin of the name Ingleside itself seems to stem from the eponymous Ingleside Hotel, a large complex constructed by one Jones S. Davis, a key figure in the creation of the city's Lyman Mills, which are now known as Open Square.

Completed in 1868, the hotel cost Mr. Davis a total of $162,000 (approximated $3.6 million in 2016 US Dollars), and opened on July 4. On July 21, 1871, the hotel hosted the first college rowing regatta in the United States held by the Rowing Association of American Colleges, one of the country's earliest intercollegiate undergraduate sporting events. Held on the banks of the Connecticut River, Massachusetts Agricultural College won the event in an upset against the teams of Harvard, Yale, and Brown. This would be one of the only significant events in the resorts history however, as following the Panic of 1873, it would be sold at auction to one N.S. Chandler "for a little less than $30,000". The hotel, which featured a farm, telegram station, gasworks, and railway stop, was short-lived however, and closed in the winter of 1874 due to low attendance in the midst of an economic depression. The hotel was razed by fire on July 25, 1875, with some indication that the blaze "was the work of an incendiary". The hotel and its contents were insured in total for $20,000. Though the hotel itself stood on the shores of the Connecticut for less than a decade, the Ingleside name would persist as that of the surrounding area long after its absence.

== Geography ==
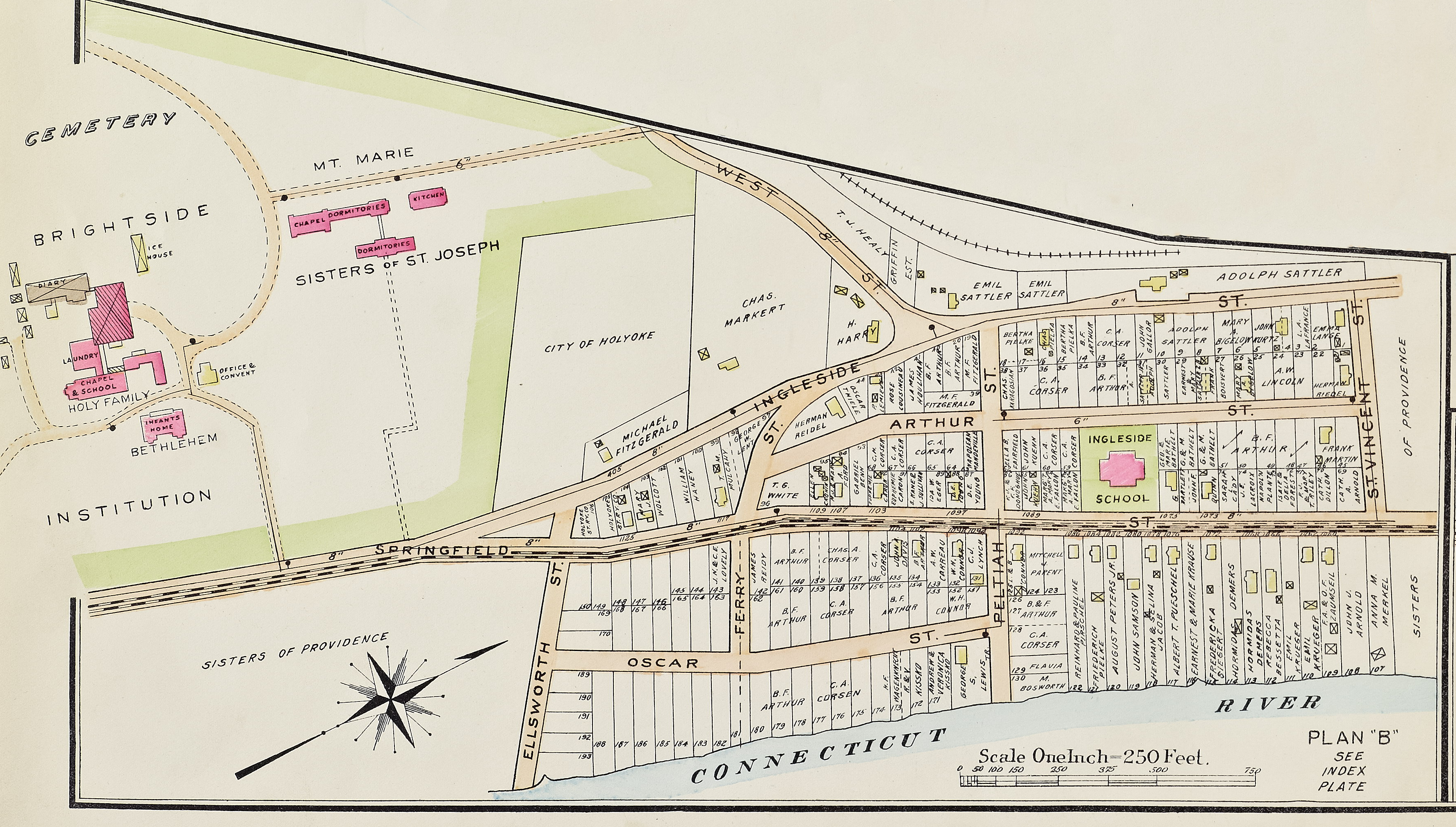
Map of the eastern portion of Ingleside as it appears in Richard's Standard Atlas of Holyoke, c. 1911

The contemporary boundaries of Ingleside are defined by Rt 91 to its west, railroad tracks to its north west, Springdale park to its northeast, the Connecticut River to its east, and West Springfield to its south.

=== Geology ===
Ingleside's western boundaries contain primarily sand and gravel deposits created by aeolian processes, creating an abundance of gravelly silty loam. In contrast the easterly portion of the neighborhood, which is adjacent to the Connecticut River, consists of floodplain alluvium. The boundary of Ingleside which borders the river contains FEMA regulated floodways which are part of a 100-year floodplain, defined by the agency as areas with a 1% chance of flooding per annum.

== Transportation ==
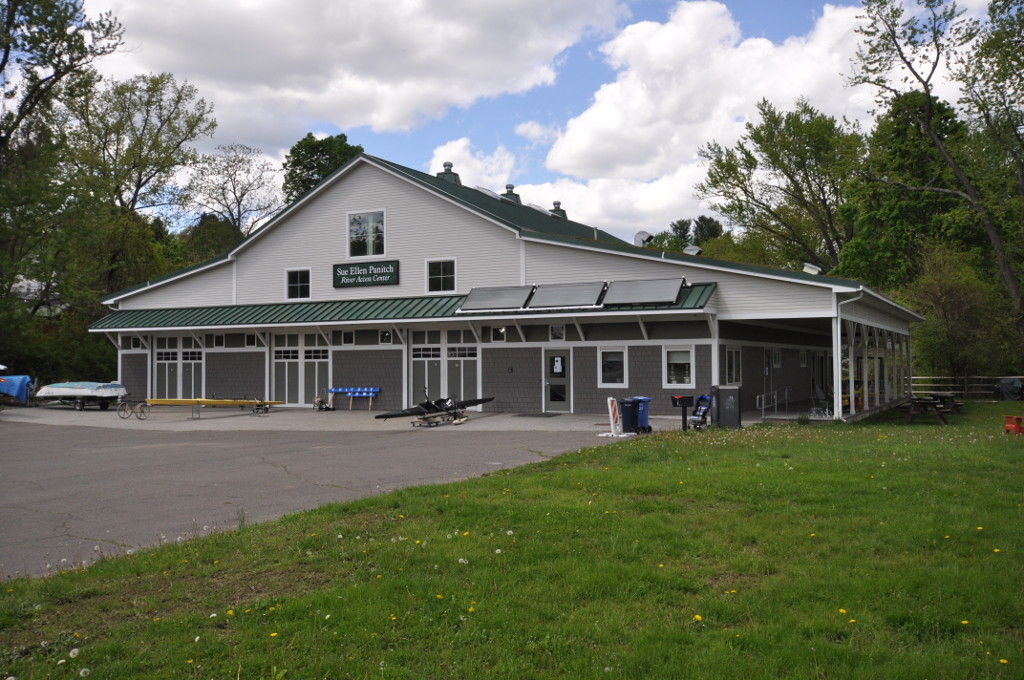
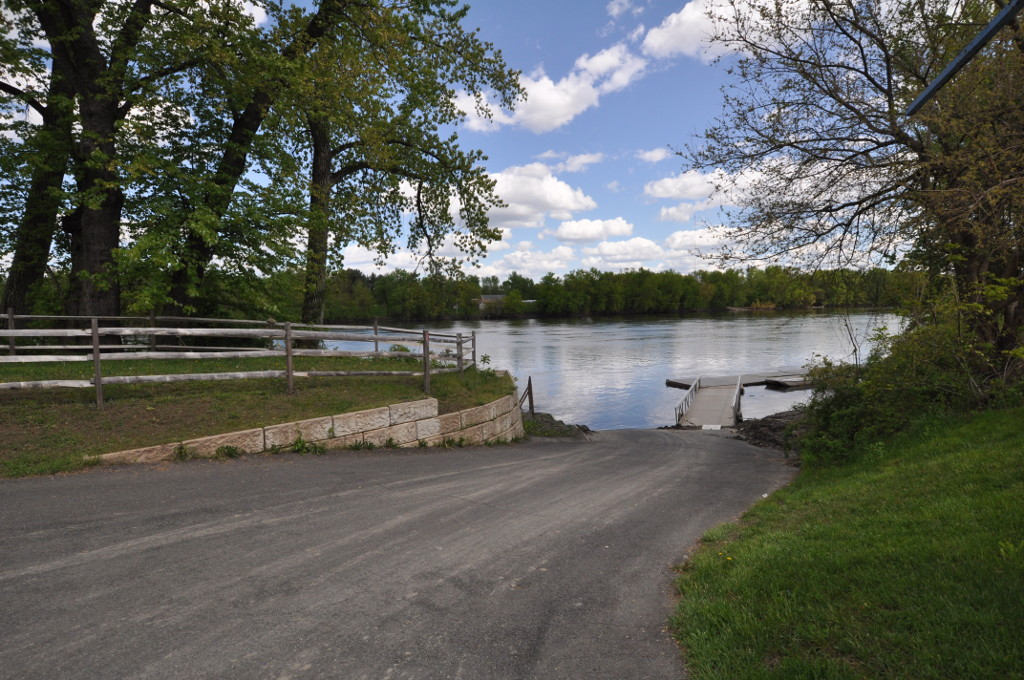
The Sue Ellen Panitch River Access Center, housing Holyoke Rows; the Jones Ferry Boat Launch on the Connecticut River

=== Streets and highways ===
Ingleside is directly accessible from U.S. Interstate 91 via Exit 15, Lower Westfield Rd./Ingleside. U.S. Route 5 traverses the neighborhood from north to south, with direct access to I-91 via exit 14, and the Massachusetts Turnpike I-90 via exit 4 at Holyoke's border with West Springfield. To its north Route 5 splits from Main Street, which continues northeasterly toward Springdale.

Several bus routes serve Ingleside, including PVTA R29 at Providence Hospital, P20 at the Holyoke Crossing shopping center, and these routes, along with the P20 Express and R41, serve the Holyoke Mall. Peter Pan Buslines also serves the Holyoke Mall stop with connections to points north and Springfield Union Station.

=== Rail ===
Ingleside was originally a stop on the New York, New Haven and Hartford Railroad but is no longer serviced by passenger rail service. A freight railway defines the northwest of the neighborhood and is presently a rail connection for the Pioneer Valley Railroad, which services rails between Westfield, Southampton, and the factory-access railways in Holyoke's canal district.

=== Boat ===
Public boat access on the Connecticut River is available for small craft from the Sue Ellen Panitch River Center on Jones Ferry Road. While portage is required for all points north of the Hadley Falls Dam or south of the dam in Enfield, Connecticut, the river can be navigated largely uninterrupted between these two points.
