= Loretta Schafer =

American Roman Catholic nun (1917–1998)

Sister Loretta Schafer, S.P.
- Born: April 2, 1917
- Died: February 19, 1998 (aged 80); Saint Mary-of-the-Woods, Indiana, US
- Burial place: Sisters of Providence Convent Cemetery, Saint Mary-of-the-Woods, Indiana, US
- Title: General Superior of the Sisters of Providence of Saint Mary-of-the-Woods
- Predecessor: Mother Mary Pius Regnier, S.P.
- Successor: Sister Anne Doherty, S.P.

Sister Loretta Schafer, S.P., (April 2, 1917 – February 19, 1998) was the Superior General of the Sisters of Providence of Saint Mary-of-the-Woods, Indiana, from 1976 to 1981. In 1977, she worked with the United States Department of Housing and Urban Development to develop and construct the Maryvale Retirement Complex at Saint Mary-of-the-Woods, Indiana.

Schafer served as Chancellor of the Archdiocese of Indianapolis, the first woman to serve in this position.

In 1978, she sold Chicago's Providence St. Mel School, which had been property of the Sisters of Providence, to principal Paul Adams after the Archdiocese of Chicago withdrew financial support. The story of the community's rallying spirit to keep the school open gained national attention and press, including a Reader's Digest article "A School That Wouldn't Die".

Catholic Church titles
Preceded by Mother Mary Pius Regnier, S.P.	General Superior of the Sisters of Providence of Saint Mary-of-the-Woods; 1976 - 1981	Succeeded by Sister Anne Doherty, S.P.
