= Mary Bernard Laughlin =

American educator and Catholic leader (1876–1948)

Mother Mary Bernard Laughlin, S.P.
- Born: Mary Laughlin; August 12, 1876; Fort Wayne, Indiana
- Died: October 6, 1948 (aged 72); Saint Mary-of-the-Woods, Indiana
- Burial place: Sisters of Providence Convent Cemetery, Saint Mary-of-the-Woods, Indiana
- Education: Saint Mary-of-the-Woods College
- Title: General Superior of the Sisters of Providence of Saint Mary-of-the-Woods
- Predecessor: Mother Mary Raphael Slattery, S.P.
- Successor: Mother Marie Helene Franey, S.P.

Mother Mary Bernard Laughlin, S.P., (August 12, 1876 – October 6, 1948) was the Superior General of the Sisters of Providence of Saint Mary-of-the-Woods, Indiana, from 1938 to 1948. During her term, she coordinated the 100th anniversary of the Congregation, which was founded in 1840 by Saint Mother Theodore Guerin, and led the sisters through World War II.

She was born Mary Laughlin to Michael Laughlin, an Irish immigrant, and Mary Slamon of Eaton, Ohio. The oldest living child in a family of twelve, Laughlin was a member of St. Patrick's parish in Fort Wayne, Indiana, until entering the Sisters of Providence on May 2, 1905. Taking the name Sister Mary Bernard, she was professed in 1907 and took final vows in 1915.

Laughlin attended high school at Saint Mary-of-the-Woods Preparatory Normal School and also attended Saint Mary-of-the-Woods College. She began her teaching career with 8th-grade boys and displayed natural leadership, becoming principal in every school to which she was assigned.

In 1925, Laughlin was elected First Assistant to the Superior General, Mother Mary Raphael Slattery. She held this position until she herself became Superior General in 1938.

== As Superior General ==
During Laughlin's administration, the Sisters of Providence expanded their ministry to include work in New Hampshire and Texas. New schools were opened in California, Oklahoma, Illinois and Indiana. Saint Mary-of-the-Woods College, run by the Sisters of Providence, gained recognition by the Association of American Universities and increased enrollment by 50%.

In 1940, Laughlin coordinated the 100th anniversary of the congregation. The Congregation entered its centennial year with a Pontifical Mass celebrated by Archbishop Joseph E. Ritter of Indianapolis. (The Sisters of Providence were founded in 1840 by Saint Mother Theodore Guerin.)

That decade, she also led the Sisters during World War II. Though the tradition of the Congregation was for the Sisters to return to Saint Mary-of-the-Woods during the summer months, in 1943 all Sisters remained wherever they were on mission, as travel was restricted on government request. That same year, Sisters of Providence ministering in Kaifeng, China, were interred in a Japanese concentration camp. After losing contact with the sisters in China for a short while, Mother Mary Bernard enlisted the help of the International Red Cross to locate the missionaries. (Main article: Sisters of Providence of Saint Mary-of-the-Woods.)

Catholic Church titles
Preceded by Mary Raphael Slattery, S.P.	General Superior of the Sisters of Providence of Saint Mary-of-the-Woods; 1938 - 1948	Succeeded by Marie Helene Franey, S.P.
Educational offices
Preceded by Mary Raphael Slattery, S.P.	President of Saint Mary-of-the-Woods College; 1938 - 1948	Succeeded by Marie Helene Franey, S.P.
