= Marie Helene Franey =

American educator and Catholic leader (1898–1953)

Mother Marie Helene Franey, S.P.
- Born: Helena Agnes Franey; July 29, 1898; Galesburg, Illinois
- Died: November 23, 1953 (aged 55); Saint Mary-of-the-Woods, Indiana
- Burial place: Sisters of Providence Convent Cemetery, Saint Mary-of-the-Woods, Indiana
- Education: Saint Mary-of-the-Woods College, Indiana University, Saint Louis University
- Title: General Superior of the Sisters of Providence of Saint Mary-of-the-Woods
- Predecessor: Mother Mary Bernard Laughlin
- Successor: Mother Gertrude Clare Owens
- Parent(s): Michael D. Franey and Margaret Connerton

Mother Marie Helene Franey, S.P., (July 29, 1898 – November 23, 1953) was the Superior General of the Sisters of Providence of Saint Mary-of-the-Woods, Indiana from 1948 to 1953. In 1952, she was appointed by the Sacred Congregation of Religious in Rome to serve on an International Commission of 40 superiors general. She was one of three superiors general from the United States to serve on this commission.

== Early life ==
She was born Helena Agnes Franey on July 29, 1898, in Galesburg, Illinois, to Michael D. and Margaret (Connerton) Franey. Helena was one of six children. Because of Michael's occupation as superintendent of workshops of the Chicago, Burlington and Quincy Railroad, the family moved often. They spent some time in Jackson, Michigan, moved to Columbus, Ohio, and settled for a time in Elkhart, Indiana. She attended Edinboro State Normal School in Edinboro, Pennsylvania before the family sent Helena to attend high school in Saint Mary-of-the-Woods, Indiana.

Both Michael and Margaret had sisters who were Sisters of Providence (Sister Mary Helena Franey and Sister Louis Joseph Connerton), so sending Helena there was a sensible decision. However, it was still a surprise when Helena decided to enter the convent herself. (Later, two of Helena's brothers would enter the priesthood, becoming Father John T. Franey and Monsignor Louis J. Franey.)

Helena entered the congregation on September 24, 1918, professed first vows in 1921 and took final vows in 1926, taking the religious name of Sister Marie Helene. She taught high school from 1920 through 1944 at Marywood Academy in Evanston, Illinois; Providence High School in Chicago; St. Augustine in Fort Wayne, Indiana; and Saint Mary-of-the-Woods Academy. From 1928 to 1929, Franey took a break from teaching to study Latin at Indiana University and earn her master's degree. She would later study at the Institute of Canon Law at Saint Louis University in Missouri.

== In administration ==
In 1944, Franey was elected a councillor of the Congregation. In 1948, she succeeded Mother Mary Bernard Laughlin as the community's general superior, earning the title of Mother Marie Helene.

As general superior, Franey established Our Lady of Providence Junior-Senior High School in Clarksville, Indiana, and furnished sisters to minister in Indianapolis; Somerville, Massachusetts; Chicago; Plainfield, Indiana; and Terre Haute, Indiana.

Franey and another Sister of Providence, Sister Francis Joseph, visited Rome during the Holy Year of 1950. In 1952, Franey and Sister Catherine Celine became the first Sisters of Providence to travel by air when they flew from Washington, D.C., to Indiana. That year, Franey was one of six general superiors to plan the First National Congress of Religious, held at University of Notre Dame in Indiana.

Franey died in office on November 23, 1953, of an acute heart attack following a short illness. A shrine to Our Lady of Fatima on the motherhouse grounds at Saint Mary-of-the-Woods is dedicated in her honor.

== Works ==
- The Idea of the Early Christians Concerning Death as Shown in Catacomb Inscriptions, 1929
- The Roman Forum in the Time of Cicero, 1930

Catholic Church titles
Preceded by Mary Bernard Laughlin, SP	General Superior of the Sisters of Providence of Saint Mary-of-the-Woods; 1948-1953	Succeeded by Gertrude Clare Owens, SP
Educational offices
Preceded by Mary Bernard Laughlin, SP	President of Saint Mary-of-the-Woods College; 1948-1953	Succeeded by Francis Joseph Elbreg, SP
