= Anne Doherty =

Sister Anne Doherty, S.P.
- Born: Teresa Anne Doherty; May 6, 1928; Indianapolis, Indiana
- Died: February 3, 2013 (aged 84); Saint Mary-of-the-Woods, Indiana
- Burial place: Sisters of Providence Convent Cemetery, Saint Mary-of-the-Woods, Indiana
- Education: Saint Mary-of-the-Woods College, Catholic University of America
- Title: General Superior of the Sisters of Providence of Saint Mary-of-the-Woods
- Predecessor: Sister Loretta Schafer
- Successor: Sister Nancy Nolan

Sister Anne Doherty, S.P., (May 6, 1928 – February 3, 2013) was an American religious sister, educator, professor and psychologist. She served as the Superior General of the Sisters of Providence of Saint Mary-of-the-Woods, Indiana, from 1981–1986. During her term, the Constitutions of the Sisters of Providence gained papal approbation.

== Early life ==
She was born Teresa Anne Doherty in Indianapolis, Indiana, to parents Patrick and Hannah Byrne Doherty and attended St. Philip Neri Parish. She entered the congregation on January 9, 1946, and was professed as a full Sister of Providence on August 15, 1953, with the religious name Sister Dennis.

Doherty graduated with a bachelor's degree from Saint Mary-of-the-Woods College in 1963 and later went to Catholic University of America to earn a master's degree in psychology (1966) and a doctorate in clinical psychology and counseling (1969).

== Ministry ==
Doherty spent time ministering as an elementary educator in Indiana and Illinois and then went on to teach at Saint Mary-of-the-Woods College, Weston School of Theology and Martin University.

She also practiced psychology at several clinics in Vigo County, Indiana, including a stint as director of Clinical Services at Katherine Hamilton Center from 1972–1979. Her clinical interests included families with children as well as treatment of sexual abuse victims and offenders. She also directed attention toward the rural poor, leading to her testifying before a 1977 Congressional Hearing on Aging regarding the needs of elderly in rural areas.

Doherty began her term as general superior in 1981. She coordinated the building of Karcher Hall at Saint Mary-of-the-Woods and began renovation of the Church of the Immaculate Conception (Saint Mary-of-the-Woods, Indiana). She also oversaw the sale of the Immaculata College property in Washington, D.C. After her term, Doherty worked as a tribunal advocate in the Diocese of Monterey, California, and the Diocese of Gary, Indiana.

In 1984, Doherty was presented the President's Award from the Ancient Order of Hibernians in Indianapolis for exemplifying Catholicism and Irish heritage.

During her last years, Doherty lived with Alzheimer's disease. She died at Saint Mary-of-the-Woods on February 3, 2013, and is buried in the Sisters of Providence Convent Cemetery.

Catholic Church titles
Preceded by Loretta Schafer, SP	General Superior of the Sisters of Providence of Saint Mary-of-the-Woods; 1981 - 1986	Succeeded by Nancy Nolan, SP
