= Mary Pius Regnier =

American Catholic nun (1914–2005)

Mother Mary Pius Regnier, S.P.
- Born: Helen Marie Regnier; April 28, 1914; Aurora, Illinois
- Died: November 27, 2005 (aged 91); Saint Mary-of-the-Woods, Indiana
- Burial place: Sisters of Providence Convent Cemetery, Saint Mary-of-the-Woods, Indiana
- Education: Saint Mary-of-the-Woods College, St. Louis University
- Title: General Superior of the Sisters of Providence of Saint Mary-of-the-Woods
- Predecessor: Mother Rose Angela Horan, S.P.
- Successor: Sister Loretta Schafer, S.P.
- Parent(s): Fred A. Regnier and Anna McDonnell Regnier

Mother Mary Pius Regnier, S.P. (April 28, 1914 – November 27, 2005) was the Superior General of the Sisters of Providence of Saint Mary-of-the-Woods, Indiana, from 1966 to 1976. She held office immediately following the Second Vatican Council, a time when Roman Catholic congregations underwent drastic changes. Regnier began the process for revising the Congregation's Constitutions to bring it into accordance with the Church's recommendations for the renewal of religious life.

== Early life ==
Born Helen Marie Regnier in 1914, she was the oldest daughter of Fred A. and Anna McDonnell Regnier in Aurora, Illinois. A brother, William, later became a Roman Catholic priest in the Roman Catholic Diocese of Rockford, Illinois.

Regnier entered the Sisters of Providence on January 23, 1932. Taking the religious name of Sister Mary Pius, she professed first vows on August 15, 1934, and final vows on January 23, 1940. Her early area of ministry was education, where she showed a love of sports and a particular skill at teaching young boys. She earned a bachelor's degree in English from Saint Mary-of-the-Woods College and a master's degree in education from Saint Louis University.

In 1960, Regnier was elected to the Sisters of Providence general council, a position which she held into 1966.

== As Superior General ==
Regnier was elected Superior General of the Congregation in 1966, earning her the name of Mother Mary Pius. In this role, she oversaw the sale of numerous Congregation-owned schools and the order's buy-in to Social Security, which became available in 1972.

Facing declining vocations, Regnier led the Congregation through its first-ever study by a secular company. Following the Second Vatican Council (ending in 1965), the Sisters of Providence along with many other congregations saw numerous departures from community. However, Regnier held the congregation together despite unrest. Under her leadership, wearing the traditional habit became optional, and the Sisters received permission to drive cars, to handle their own correspondence, and to use electric clocks. Regnier also saw the Sisters through the moratorium on new members that was mandated by the Vatican from 1972 to 1974 for all religious orders.

After her term as Superior General, Regnier spent a period of time in the Diocese of Joliet in Illinois, spending 15 years in the Marriage Tribunal there. In her position as advocate, she gathered information regarding the marriages of persons seeking annulment. After retiring from there in 1993, she served on staff at the health care services at Saint Mary-of-the-Woods and in prayer ministry, spending significant time in the Blessed Sacrament Chapel.

In 2000, along with many other Sisters of Providence, Regnier pledged to donate her brain to science in order to advance medical knowledge of brain disease, saying, "This is research. Something positive could come of it, so I gladly agreed."

Regnier died at Saint Mary-of-the-Woods on November 27, 2005. Said Sister Ann Margaret O'Hara, Superior General at the time, "She had a wonderful light and happy spirit. She knew how to relate to people and how to draw the best out of them. She had the kind of wisdom that always stayed on the core values of religious life."

Catholic Church titles
Preceded by Mother Rose Angela Horan, S.P.	General Superior of the Sisters of Providence of Saint Mary-of-the-Woods; 1966–1976	Succeeded by Sister Loretta Schafer, S.P.
