= Nancy Nolan =

American Roman Catholic nun and academic administrator

Sister Nancy Nolan, S.P.
- Born: May 13, 1936; Galesburg, Illinois
- Died: December 20, 2020 (aged 84); Saint Mary-of-the-Woods, Indiana
- Title: General Superior of the Sisters of Providence of Saint Mary-of-the-Woods
- Predecessor: Sister Anne Doherty, S.P.
- Successor: Sister Diane Ris, S.P.

Sister Nancy Nolan, S.P. (May 13, 1936 - December 20, 2020) was the Superior General of the Sisters of Providence of Saint Mary-of-the-Woods, Indiana, from 1986-1996. During her term, she completed renovation of the Church of the Immaculate Conception (Saint Mary-of-the-Woods, Indiana). Nolan also oversaw the 150th anniversary of the Congregation, founded by Saint Mother Theodore Guerin in 1840, and completed the construction of Providence Center at Saint Mary-of-the-Woods.

During her term she was actively involved in the process of promoting the Cause for the Canonization of Mother Theodore Guerin, who was canonized a Roman Catholic saint in 2006.

After serving as Superior General, Nolan spent time as president of Guerin College Preparatory High School in Chicago until February 2007. A scholarship program there, Nolan Scholars, was named in her honor.

On December 20, 2020, at the age of 84, Nolan died at the motherhouse in Saint Mary-of-the-Woods, Indiana.

Catholic Church titles
Preceded by Sister Anne Doherty, S.P.	General Superior of the Sisters of Providence of Saint Mary-of-the-Woods; 1986 - 1996	Succeeded by Sister Diane Ris, S.P.
