= Diane Ris =

American Roman Catholic nun and educator

Sister Diane Ris, S.P.
- Sister Diane Ris (right) with a friend in July 2008.
- Born: Diane Lawlor Ris; July 16, 1932; Port Chester, New York
- Died: February 20, 2013 (aged 80); Saint Mary-of-the-Woods, Indiana
- Title: General Superior of the Sisters of Providence of Saint Mary-of-the-Woods
- Predecessor: Sister Nancy Nolan, S.P.
- Successor: Sister Ann Margaret O'Hara, S.P.

Sister Diane Ris, S.P., (16 July 1932 – 20 February 2013) was the Superior General of the Sisters of Providence of Saint Mary-of-the-Woods, Indiana, USA, from 1996 to 2001. She was also an educator and author.

== Career ==
Ris entered the congregation in July 1951 and became a fully professed Sister of Providence on 23 January 1959, with the religious name Sister Martin Therese. She studied education at Saint Mary-of-the-Woods College and Indiana University before earning a doctorate from Ball State University in elementary education. Ris taught at several grade schools in Indiana, Illinois and Maryland before becoming a professor of education at Morehead State University, a position which she held for 20 years. In 1989 the university presented her with the Distinguished Teacher Award, the highest honor for Morehead faculty. In 1995, she held a temporary interim director position with Global Education Associates in New York.

During her term as superior general, revised versions of the congregation's Constitutions and Complementary Document (1997) were published. Ris also continued the process of the canonization of the order's foundress, Theodore Guerin, including the beatification ceremony in Rome in October 1998. She was also present for the final canonization ceremonies in October 2006.

Ris was behind a major effort during the Catholic Jubilee year of 2000 to forgive the debt of three sponsored institutions of the Congregation. Through this campaign, $1,567,466 was forgiven. She also supported anti-death penalty efforts.

In part due to the timing of Guerin's canonization process, Ris dedicated much of her time to research into Guerin's life and legacy, and her expertise has been cited in several publications including Bill Briggs's 2010 book The Third Miracle. In 2011, Ris completed and published a new biography of Guerin that had originally been started by Sister Joseph Eleanor Ryan prior to her death in 1991. The book, Saint Mother Theodore Guerin: Woman of Providence, contains previously unpublished material from the Sisters of Providence archives.

== Works ==
- The Effect of Formal Pre-student Teaching Experiences on the Anxiety Level and Performance of Beginning Student Teachers in the Elementary School (1977)
- Saint Mother Theodore Guérin: Woman of Providence (2011) ISBN 1-4567-3605-1 (with Joseph Eleanor Ryan)

Catholic Church titles
Preceded by Sister Nancy Nolan, S.P.	General Superior of the Sisters of Providence of Saint Mary-of-the-Woods; 1996 - 2001	Succeeded by Sisters Ann Margaret O'Hara, S.P.
