= Land of Providence =

Open space reservation

Coordinates: 42.168°N 72.631°W

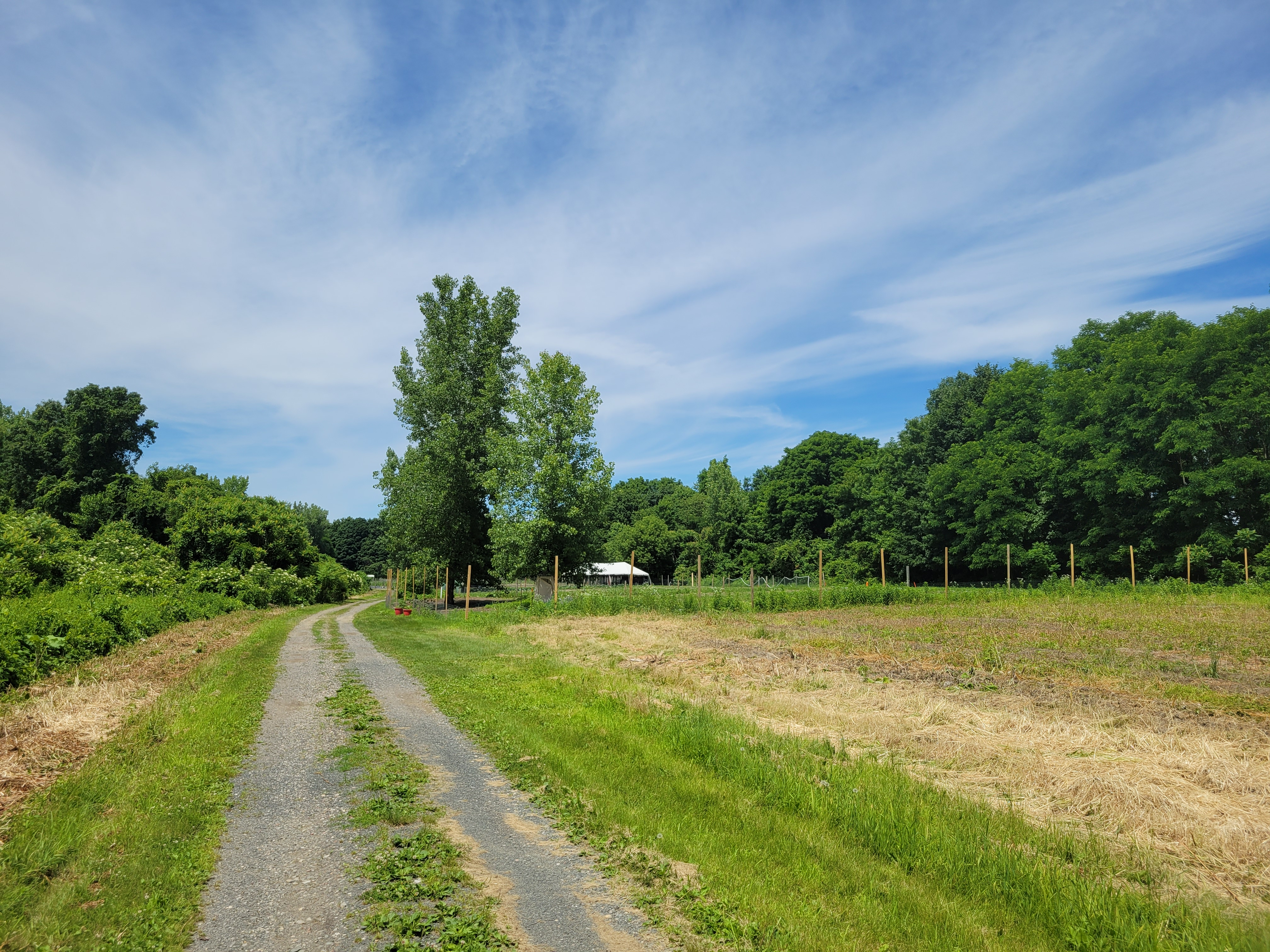
- Land of Providence
- Interactive map of Land of Providence
- Location: Massachusetts, United States
- Established: 2009
- Operator: The Trustees of Reservations

Land of Providence is a 25-acre (100,000 m^{2}) open space reservation located in the Ingleside neighborhood of Holyoke, Massachusetts, on the banks of the Connecticut River. The property was previously owned by the Sisters of Providence. In 2009 it was donated to The Trustees of Reservations and is now used for farming by the local organization Nuestras Raices, which allows local residents farm the land and raise livestock.

== History ==
The Trustees of Reservations were given this piece of land by the Sisters of Providence in June 2009. With this gift, The Trustees of Reservations committed to serving as long-term stewards of the river and land, carrying out the legacy of the Sisters of Providence, supporting Nuestras Raices, and providing outdoor opportunities for community members.

== Programs at Land of Providence ==
Programs held at the Land of Providence include the Holyoke Boys & Girls Club environmental education program, farm intern stewardship apprenticeships, Holyoke Youth Conservation Corps, winter snowshoe treks, public and private tours, kayak yours, yoga as well as public workshops on topics such as: worm composting, container gardening, greenhouse assembly, and rain barrel setup.

== Visiting ==
Land of Providence is open from April 1 through November 30 daily, sunrise to sunset. It can be accessed from either Route 5 in Holyoke or from Jones Ferry Road in Holyoke. Restrooms near the property are available seasonally only.

This property is open for birdwatching, cross-country skiing or snowshoeing (in season), picnicking, and moderate hiking. Dog walking or bicycle use on the property is strictly prohibited. Public transportation is available.
