= Rose Angela Horan =

American nun

Mother Rose Angela Horan, S.P.
- Born: Mary Cecilia Horan; June 13, 1895
- Died: August 19, 1985 (aged 90); Saint Mary-of-the-Woods, Indiana
- Burial place: Sisters of Providence Convent Cemetery, Saint Mary-of-the-Woods, Indiana
- Education: Saint Mary-of-the-Woods College, Indiana State Teachers College
- Title: General Superior of the Sisters of Providence of Saint Mary-of-the-Woods
- Predecessor: Mother Gertrude Clare Owens, S.P.
- Successor: Mother Mary Pius Regnier, S.P.
- Parent(s): Mary (Farrell) and Michael Horan

Mother Rose Angela Horan, S.P., (June 13, 1895 – August 19, 1985) was the Superior General of the Sisters of Providence of Saint Mary-of-the-Woods, Indiana, from 1960 to 1966. During her term, she supervised the division of the Congregation into separate regions as well as provinces. She expanded the ministries of the Sisters of Providence through Providence Retirement Home, opened in New Albany, Indiana, in 1962. Horan also oversaw the construction of Guerin High School in River Grove, Illinois, and sent Sisters of Providence to minister in Arequipa, Peru.

Born Mary Cecilia Horan in 1895 to Mary Farrell and Michael Horan, she entered the Sisters of Providence on September 6, 1913, at the age of 18. Taking the religious name of Sister Rose Angela, she professed first vows on August 15, 1916, and final vows on the same date in 1924. After earning a bachelor's degree from Saint Mary-of-the-Woods College and a Masters from Indiana State Teachers College, Horan spent many years teaching English and Latin in Illinois and Indiana. She was later awarded an honorary Doctor of Laws degree from Indiana State University.

A scholar, philosopher, and poet, Horan gave a talk on the "Philosophy of Aging" during the Sisters of Providence National Congress of 1973. She also wrote numerous poems, prose, and papers for the private use of her religious community.

== Works ==
- The Story of Old St. John's: A Parish Rooted in Pioneer Indianapolis (1971)

Catholic Church titles
Preceded by Gertrude Clare Owens, SP	General Superior of the Sisters of Providence of Saint Mary-of-the-Woods; 1960 - 1966	Succeeded by Mary Pius Regnier, SP
