= Denise Wilkinson =

American Roman Catholic nun

Sister Denise Wilkinson, S.P.
- Title: General Superior of the Sisters of Providence of Saint Mary-of-the-Woods
- Predecessor: Sister Ann Margaret O'Hara, S.P.
- Successor: Sister Dawn Tomaszewski, S.P.

Sister Denise Wilkinson, S.P. is a Catholic leader, writer and educator. She was the Superior General of the Sisters of Providence of Saint Mary-of-the-Woods, Indiana, from 2006 to 2016. During her term, the congregation's foundress Saint Mother Theodore Guerin was canonized a saint. Wilkinson also oversaw the founding of the Providence Associates program, the renovation of several properties at Saint Mary-of-the-Woods, and long-range planning for the Sisters of Providence.

== Career ==
Wilkinson attended Marywood High School in Evanston, Illinois, where she was first introduced to the Sisters of Providence congregation. Wilkinson entered the congregation on September 12, 1963, and became a fully professed Sister of Providence on August 25, 1973.

Wilkinson earned a bachelor's degree in English from Saint Mary-of-the-Woods College. She also attended Saint Louis University and received her master's in counseling.

She spent some time as Vice President of Student Affairs at Saint Mary-of-the-Woods College, promoting the college as "a spot to demonstrate works of love, mercy and justice."

In 2006, Wilkinson was elected superior general of the Sisters of Providence when Sister Ann Margaret O'Hara decided not to seek a second term. Wilkinson was re-elected in 2011. Her administration focused on long-range congregation planning and moving the Sisters of Providence toward self-sufficiency. Wilkinson and her administration opened Providence Cristo Rey High School in Indianapolis as a sponsored ministry of the Congregation in 2007.

A significant part of Wilkinson's terms involved the canonization of Saint Mother Theodore Guerin in October 2006. Over the course of her administration, Wilkinson led the establishment of the permanent shrine of Saint Mother Theodore, which opened in 2014. She also led efforts to streamline the Sisters' finances and maximize use of buildings owned by the congregation.

After two terms as general superior, she was succeeded by Sister Dawn Tomaszewski in the role on September 10, 2016.

Catholic Church titles
Preceded by Sister Ann Margaret O'Hara, S.P.	General Superior of the Sisters of Providence of Saint Mary-of-the-Woods; 2001 - 2006	Succeeded by Sister Dawn Tomaszewski, S.P.
