= Mary Slattery =

Mary Slattery may refer to:

- Mary Slattery, first wife of American playwright Arthur Miller
- Mary Raphael Slattery (1863–1940), Superior General of the Sisters of Providence of Saint Mary-of-the-Woods, Indiana
