= Parish (Catholic Church) =

Ecclesiastical subdivision of a diocese

In the Catholic Church, a parish (Latin: parochia) is a stable community of the faithful within a particular church, whose pastoral care has been entrusted to a parish priest (Latin: parochus), under the authority of the diocesan bishop. It is the lowest ecclesiastical subdivision in the Catholic episcopal polity, and the primary constituent unit of a diocese or eparchy. Parishes are extant in both the Latin and Eastern Catholic Churches. In the 1983 Code of Canon Law, parishes are constituted under cc. 515–552, entitled "Parishes, Pastors, and Parochial Vicars."

== Types ==
Most parishes are territorial parishes, which comprise all the Christian faithful living within a defined geographic area. Some parishes may be joined with others in a deanery or vicariate forane and overseen by a vicar forane, also known as a dean or archpriest.

Per canon 518, a bishop may also erect non-territorial parishes, or personal parishes, within his see. Personal parishes are created to better serve Catholics of a particular rite, language, nationality, or other commonality which make them a distinct community. Such parishes include the following:

- National parishes, established to serve the faithful of a certain ethnic group or national origin, offering services and activities in their native language.
- Parishes established to serve university students.
- Parishes established in accordance with the 7 July 2007 motu proprio Apostolic Letter Summorum Pontificum "for celebrations according to the older form of the Roman rite", i.e., the form in use in 1962
- Parishes belonging to the personal ordinariates for former Anglicans as established by Anglicanorum Coetibus of 4 November 2009. In the United States, this also includes those established prior to 2009, by the Pastoral Provision and other dispensations for former members of the Episcopal Church in the United States

All the Catholic faithful who reside in a territorial parish are considered constitutive of that territorial parish, and all members of a community for which a personal parish has been erected are similarly members of that personal parish. Membership should not be confused with registration or worship, however. Catholics may for convenience or taste attend liturgies at any Catholic church, even Eastern Catholic ones. The term church may refer to the parish – the community that meets together – or to the building. In this article it is used to refer to the building.

== Personnel ==
Each parish is charged to a parish priest (sometimes called a pastor in the United States and provost in Poland), although pastoral care of one or more parishes can also be entrusted to a team of priests in solidum under the direction of one of them, who is to be answerable to the bishop for their activity. In extraordinary situations, a share in the pastoral care of a parish can also be entrusted to a deacon or lay person under the supervision of a priest. Canon 519 states:

The parish priest is the proper clergyman in charge of the congregation of the parish entrusted to him. He exercises the pastoral care of the community entrusted to him under the authority of the diocesan bishop, whose ministry of Christ he is called to share, so that for this community he may carry out the offices of teaching, sanctifying and ruling with the cooperation of other priests or deacons and with the assistance of lay members of Christ's faithful, in accordance with the law.

In American usage, a "parish priest" is any priest assigned to a parish even in a subordinate capacity, and some may be designated as associate pastors or assistant pastors. Globally they may be known as assistant priests, parochial vicars or curates.

=== Other personnel ===
In addition to the parish priest and any assistant priests he may have, a parish commonly has a staff of lay people (vestry), religious, and ordained deacons. For example, a parish secretary may assist in administrative matters, a parish sister in activities such as visiting the sick, and a perhaps married permanent deacon in sacramental as well as pastoral or administrative duties.

A parish is obliged to have a finance committee and, if the bishop considers it opportune, a pastoral council or parish council. The finance committee and pastoral council are only consultative. Often the parish council is elected, to be broadly representative of the parish community, while members of the finance committee are more often appointed by the pastor according to their expertise.

== Parish life ==
=== Parish church ===
Each parish has at least one place of worship, the parish church. Geography, overcrowding, or other circumstances may induce the parish to establish alternative worship centers, however, which may not have a full-time parish priest.

The parish church is the center of most Catholics' spiritual life, since it is there that they receive the sacraments. On Sundays, and perhaps also daily, Mass is celebrated by a priest resident in the parish. Confession is made available, and perhaps Vespers in the larger or more progressive parishes. There are also laity-led activities and social events in accordance with local culture and circumstances.

=== Parochial school ===
Many parishes in different parts of the world operate schools for the children of the parish, though their organization, staffing, and funding varies widely according to local practice. However, many parishes cannot support schools alone, and there may be regional schools run by some parish or by the diocese. In addition to the standard curriculum, students at parochial schools are given moral and religious instruction in line with the teachings of the Catholic Church.

=== Other facilities ===
In addition to a parish church, each parish may maintain auxiliary organizations and their facilities such as a rectory, parish hall, parochial school, or convent, frequently located on the same campus or adjacent to the church.

== Formation ==
A parish has two constitutive elements: a body of Christian faithful and a parish priest (called the pastor in the United States) to serve their spiritual needs. The parish is a "juridic person" under canon law, and thus recognized as a unit with certain rights and responsibilities. It is not autonomous, however. The diocesan bishop has the sole power to erect, suppress, or alter parishes, after consulting with his Presbyteral Council.

Ecclesiae Sanctae, a 1966 Apostolic Letter of Pope Paul VI issued motu proprio, directs that

parishes in which apostolic activity can be performed only with difficulty or less effectively because of the excessive number of the faithful or too vast a territory or for any other reason, be suitably divided or dismembered according to the various circumstances. Likewise parishes which are too small should be united insofar as the situation demands it and circumstances permit.

Where a parish priest has been named to pastor a defined community, but circumstances do not permit it to be formally erected as a parish, the congregation is recognized as a quasi-parish. Quasi-parishes would be found in new mission churches, called "missions" of the mother parish, in new neighborhoods, and in communities too small to support their own priest.

== Naming ==
Canon law provides no formal guidelines for choosing a name for a parish or quasi-parish; however, the Congregation for Divine Worship and the Discipline of the Sacraments issued guidelines in 1999 that it may commonly be the same as the name of the parish church. In turn, the Rite of Dedication of a Church and an Altar stipulates that this name must be

- the name of the Holy Trinity
- a name for Christ, invoked in the liturgy, or a mystery of his life
- the name of the Holy Spirit
- a name for the Blessed Virgin Mary, invoked under a title for her used in the liturgy
- the name of a holy angel
- the name of a canonized saint, as it appears in the Roman Martyrology (or appendix)
- the name of a blessed, but only with the permission of the Holy See.

If two or more parishes are merged, the church buildings of each parish retain their names, but the parish itself may adopt a different name for pastoral reasons.

== Merger and suppression ==
Bishops may close parishes through two legal mechanisms under canon law. In a merger, the identity of two or more parishes are abolished, and their former congregants organized into a new parish, and take on its identity. Under suppression, the identity of one parish is abolished, and its former congregants are joined to one or more extant parishes and take on their identity.

Suppression occurs only when the Church believes the entity of the existing parish cannot continue. This includes cases such as bankruptcy, abuse, or deviations from canonical teachings. In effect, however, the community of people that constituted the former parish is merged into one or more remaining parishes after a suppression, because the geographic area must, by canon law, be covered by other parishes. Exceptions are rare, as Dario Castrillón Hoyos of the Congregation for the Clergy explained in a 2006 letter to Bishop William S. Skylstad, president of the United States Conference of Catholic Bishops:

[O]nly with great difficulty can one say that a parish becomes extinct. A parish is extinguished by the law itself only if no Catholic community any longer exists in its territory, or if no pastoral activity has taken place for a hundred years (can. 120 #1). When a parish is "suppressed" by competent authority, in reality, the still existing community of Christ's faithful is actually "merged" into the neighboring community of Christ's faithful and constitutes a larger community, and the territory of the extinguished parish is added to the other, forming a larger territorial unit.

Parishes are typically suppressed or merged when they become unsustainable due to a decline in the local Catholic population. For example, given the ongoing priest shortage, a bishop may wish to reallocate clergy serving a small parish so that they can help serve a larger one, or a decline in contributions may make upkeep of a large, old parish church economically impossible. The merger or suppression of a parish does not necessarily require that its parish church or other operations be closed, however. The former parish church may be retained as an alternative worship space, for example, or converted for other pastoral use.

=== Opposition to suppressions ===
Controversy has arisen in the United States over the suppression of parishes, and over the disposition of parochial assets and liabilities following such a change.

Some bishops have interpreted suppression as equivalent to the extinction of a parish under canon 123 (as due to war or disaster), in which case the assets and liabilities of the former parish revert to the diocese. In most cases, however, the local Catholic population was stable, and could not be said to be extinct, and so they should have been distributed to the successor parishes, as the Congregation for the Clergy emphasized in 2006 letter to the USCCB.

In other cases, parishioners have objected to the closing of churches, making administrative recourse to the Vatican and staging sit-in protests at churches in Boston, Springfield, and Worcester, Massachusetts; Allentown and Scranton, Pennsylvania; and Syracuse and Buffalo, New York. In 2010 the Supreme Tribunal Apostolic Signatura, the highest court within the Catholic Church, overruled bishops, ruling that the closing of churches in Springfield, Allentown, and Buffalo was unnecessary and thus not permitted under canon 1222.

== Statistics ==
The number of parishioners varies widely from parish to parish, even within the same diocese, reflecting local demographics and worship practices. The "ideal" size parish is a subject of debate. According to a study by the Center for Applied Research in the Apostolate, the average parish in the United States grew in size from 2,260 parishioners in 2000 to 3,277 in 2010. The largest parish in the world is St. Mary's Catholic Church, Dubai with 350,000 parishioners.

The number of parishes, similarly, varies widely from diocese to diocese. As of December 2012 there were 221,740 parishes, among total 456,503 pastoral centers in the world. Some statistics on the total number of parishes in different countries are maintained by their respective Episcopal Conference, and reported in the Annuario Pontificio:

- Brazil - 12,199 (2020)
- France - 18,844 (2005); 13,577 (2020)
- Germany - 12,488 (2005); 10,051 (2020)
- India - 11,179 (2020)
- Italy - 25,694 (2006); 25,581 (2020)
- Mexico - 7,648 (2020)
- Poland - 10,162 (2006); 10,391 (2020)
- Spain - 22,674 (2010); 22,895 (2020)
- United States - 17,413 (2013); 16,722 (2020)

== See also ==
- Chapel of ease
- Filial church
- Personal prelature
- Titular church

== Bibliography ==
- Michael Trueman and Pete Vere. When Parishes Merge or Close. Catholic Answers Magazine
- Bruce, Tricia Colleen. 2017. Parish and Place: Making Room for Diversity in the American Catholic Church. New York, NY: Oxford University Press.
