= Mary Raphael Slattery =

Mother Mary Raphael Slattery, S.P.
- Born: Mary Slattery; January 17, 1863; Galesburg, Illinois
- Died: September 9, 1940 (aged 77); Saint Mary-of-the-Woods, Indiana
- Burial place: Sisters of Providence Convent Cemetery, Saint Mary-of-the-Woods, Indiana
- Title: General Superior of the Sisters of Providence of Saint Mary-of-the-Woods
- Predecessor: Mother Mary Cleophas Foley, S.P.
- Successor: Mother Mary Bernard Laughlin, S.P.
- Parent(s): Patrick and Hannah (Marshall) Slattery

Mother Mary Raphael Slattery, S.P., (January 17, 1863 – September 9, 1940) was the superior general of the Sisters of Providence of Saint Mary-of-the-Woods, Indiana, from 1926 to 1938. During her term, her business sense helped the congregation through the Great Depression. In the midst of the Depression, Slattery had Saint Mary-of-the-Woods College, originally under the finances of the congregation, separately incorporated in order to protect its future.

She oversaw the founding of Providence High School in Chicago, now known as Providence St. Mel School. Slattery also sent Sisters of Providence for the first time to minister in Oklahoma, North Carolina and California.

Slattery also promoted among her religious sisters a devotion to Our Lady of Providence, encouraging them to share this devotion with their students.

Born Mary Slattery in Galesburg, Illinois, she entered the congregation on September 4, 1882, and was professed as a full Sister of Providence on August 15, 1885. She spent time ministering in Valparaiso, Indiana, and at Saint Agnes Academy in Indianapolis. Beginning in 1902, Slattery spent 24 years as treasurer of the congregation until she was elected superior general in 1926.

Catholic Church titles
Preceded by Mother Mary Cleophas Foley, S.P.	General Superior of the Sisters of Providence of Saint Mary-of-the-Woods; 1926 - 1938	Succeeded by Mother Mary Bernard Laughlin, S.P.
Educational offices
Preceded by Mother Mary Cleophas Foley, S.P.	President of Saint Mary-of-the-Woods College; 1926 - 1938	Succeeded by Mother Mary Bernard Laughlin, S.P.
