= Women of Providence in Collaboration =

American religious association

- Abbreviation: WPC
- Formation: 1982
- Type: Association of congregations of women religious
- Executive director: Sister Ann Margaret O'Hara, SP (Saint Mary-of-the-Woods)
- Website: www.WPCweb.org

Women of Providence in Collaboration or WPC is an association of congregations of North American Roman Catholic religious sisters with "Providence" in their name. It initially grew out of an idea by Sister Michelle Holland, SP (Spokane, Washington), to have an event for religious congregations to come together with the purpose of "exploring together the theology and spirituality of Providence." This event occurred in 1980 in Great Falls, Montana, and 80 sisters from varying congregations attended.

In 1982 another event occurred, from which a Women of Providence in Collaboration steering committee was formed. This committee included Michelle Holland, SP of Spokane; Barbara Doherty, SP of Saint Mary-of-the-Woods; Kathleen Popko, SP of Holyoke; Mary Joan Coultas, CDP of Pittsburgh; and Anita Green, CDP of St. Louis.

Since 1982, the congregations have continued meeting and hosting events for their congregation members. These members are:

- Congregation of Divine Providence, San Antonio, Texas
- Congregation of the Sisters of Divine Providence, Wakefield, Rhode Island
- Missionary Catechists of Divine Providence, San Antonio, Texas
- Oblate Sisters of Providence, Baltimore
- Sisters of Providence, Montreal Quebec
- Sisters of Providence of Holyoke, Massachusetts
- Sisters of Providence of Saint Mary-of-the-Woods, Indiana
- Sisters of Providence of St. Vincent de Paul, Kingston, Ontario

The current executive director is Sister Ann Margaret O'Hara, SP, member of the Sisters of Providence of Saint Mary-of-the-Woods
