= Providence Health System =

Providence Health Systems was established by the Sisters of Providence of Holyoke in 1984. In 1998, Providence Health of Holyoke, Massachusetts merged with Allegany Health System and Eastern Mercy Health System in Radnor, Pennsylvania to form "Catholic Health East", which has 23 hospitals from Maine to Florida and was the eighth-highest-grossing hospital chain in the nation.

== History ==
In November 1873, at the request of Rev. Patrick J. Harkins, pastor of St. Jerome's Church, four Sisters of Charity of Saint Vincent de Paul from Kingston, Ontario, Canada, came to Holyoke, Massachusetts to establish a charitable mission. They began to care for the sick poor, most of whom were immigrants laboring in the city's paper mills.

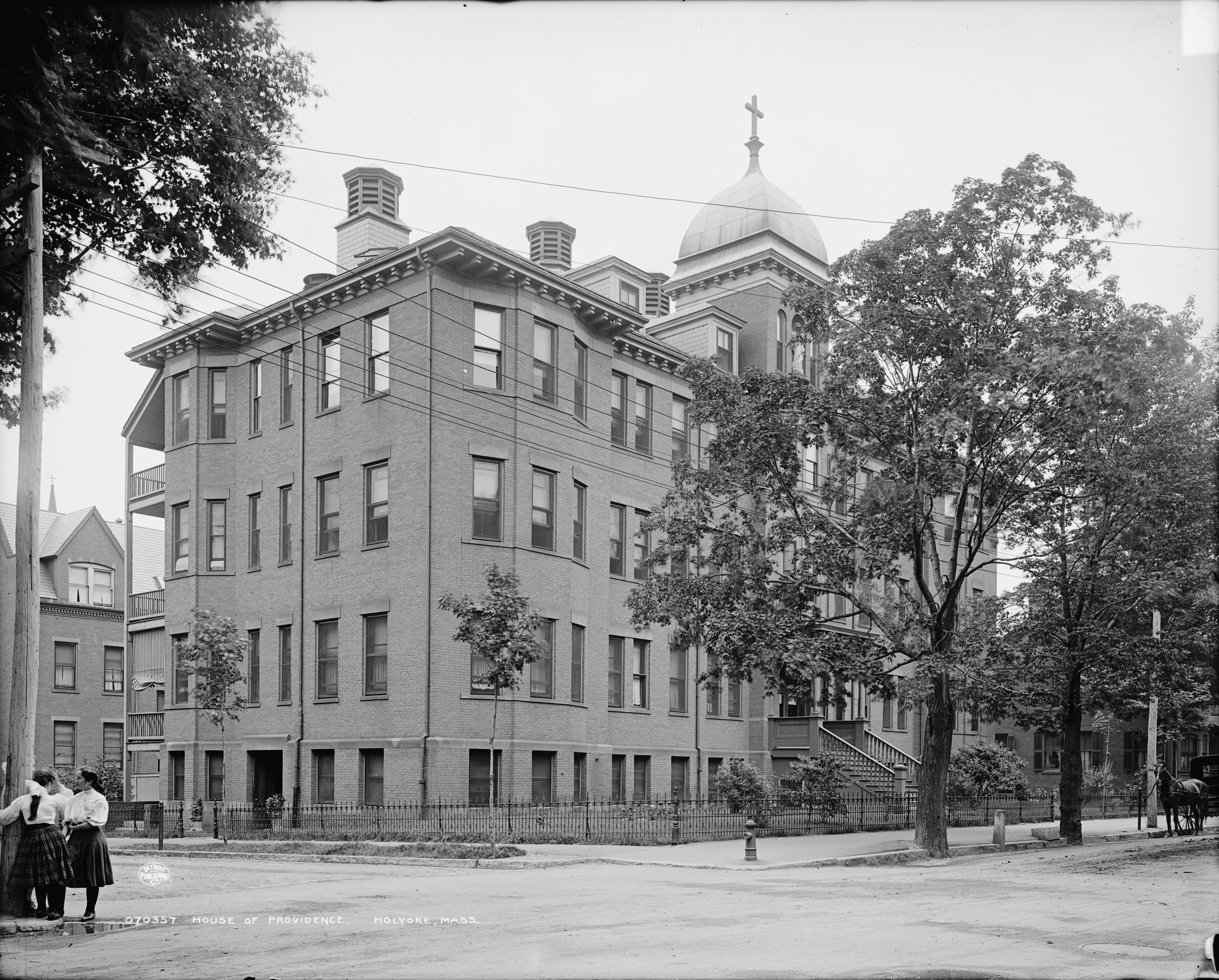
House of Providence, Holyoke, Massachusetts (c. 1910)

Within one week, the sisters welcomed their first orphan. It was not long after that before the city almoner was sending the city's needy and the infirm to the sisters for care and shelter. The House of Providence functioned as a hospital, orphanage, home for the elderly and convent.

== Healthcare ==
Providence Hospital, Holyoke's first full-service medical facility was founded in 1873. Mercy Hospital in Springfield, the first Catholic hospital in western Massachusetts. developed from a Holyoke mission. Saint Vincent Hospital in Worcester was founded in 1893.

== Present day ==
Providence Health Systems was established by the Sisters of Providence of Holyoke in 1984. They brought the health care facilities they owned and operated together to form "Sisters of Providence Health and Human Service System, Inc. (SPHS)". These facilities initially included Providence Hospital, Beaven Kelly Home, and Mount St. Vincent Nursing Home, all in Holyoke; Mercy Hospital and St. Luke’s Home, in Springfield; Our Lady of Providence Children’s Center in West Springfield; Farren Memorial Hospital in Turners Falls, Massachusetts; and St. Joseph of the Pines in Southern Pines, North Carolina.

In 1990, Farren Memorial Hospital transitioned "Farren Care Center", focusing on care for people with long-term medical conditions and behavioral disorders. By summer of 2020, Farren was "no longer able to efficiently support the requirements of caring for its more complex residents." Plans were being made to relocate residents to Mount Saint Vincent Care Center in Holyoke.

In 1967, the Sisters of Providence assumed management of the Diocese of Raleigh's St. Joseph of the Pines Hospital, a 75-bed acute care facility, built of the site of the 1928 Pine Needles Golf Resort Hotel. hospital and added Home Care services. One year later, SJP shifted its mission from acute medical care to long-term care.

In 1992, Sisters of Providence Health and Human Service System, Inc. (DBA Providence Systems) changed its name to Sisters of Providence Health System, Inc. (SPHS). Six years later the Sisters were instrumental in joining with two other Catholic health systems, Eastern Mercy Health System and Allegany Health System to form Catholic Health East, one of the larger Catholic health systems in the U.S., a multi-institutional system with facilities spanning the eastern coast from Maine to Florida.
