= Sisters of Providence of St. Vincent de Paul =

- Formation: 1861
- Type: religious institute
- Headquarters: Kingston, Ontario
- General superior: Sister Sandra Shannon
- Website: www.providence.ca

The Sisters of Providence of St. Vincent de Paul are an apostolic congregation of vowed women religious, who rely on and proclaim the Providence of God. They are the only religious congregation founded in Kingston, Ontario.

== History ==
In 1843 congregation of the "Daughters of Charity, Servants of the Poor" was founded in Montreal by Bishop Ignace Bourget and Émilie Gamelin. Its object is to provide for the poor and sick spiritual and temporal relief, to shelter children and the aged, to visit the homes of the poor and the ill, to shelter the infirm and the homeless, to maintain dispensaries for the needy, and to instruct the young. On December 13, 1861, four Sisters from Montreal arrived in Kingston to found what is now known as the Sisters of Providence of St. Vincent de Paul.

== Spirituality ==
In accordance with their mission statement, the Sisters of Providence of St. Vincent de Paul seek to empower others, especially the poor and oppressed, to achieve a quality of life in keeping with their human dignity. They also strive to be prophetic leaders in their Church and in society.

The Sisters of Providence of St. Vincent de Paul follow their charism of compassionate caring for God's people, especially the most destitute, manifested by service given in a spirit of humility, simplicity and charity. As they serve with compassion and walk in hope, they trust in the power, the movement and the mystery of Providence in all things.

== General superiors ==
The first general superior of the Sisters of Providence of St. Vincent de Paul was Mother Mary Edward, born Catherine McKinley.

The current general superior is Sister Sandra Shannon.

== Current ==
The congregation is a member of the Women of Providence in Collaboration. The web site was relaunched on December 13, 2011, marking the end of the 150th Anniversary celebrations. It is accessible at http://www.providence.ca.
