= Providence Behavioral Health Hospital =

- Trinity Health Of New England

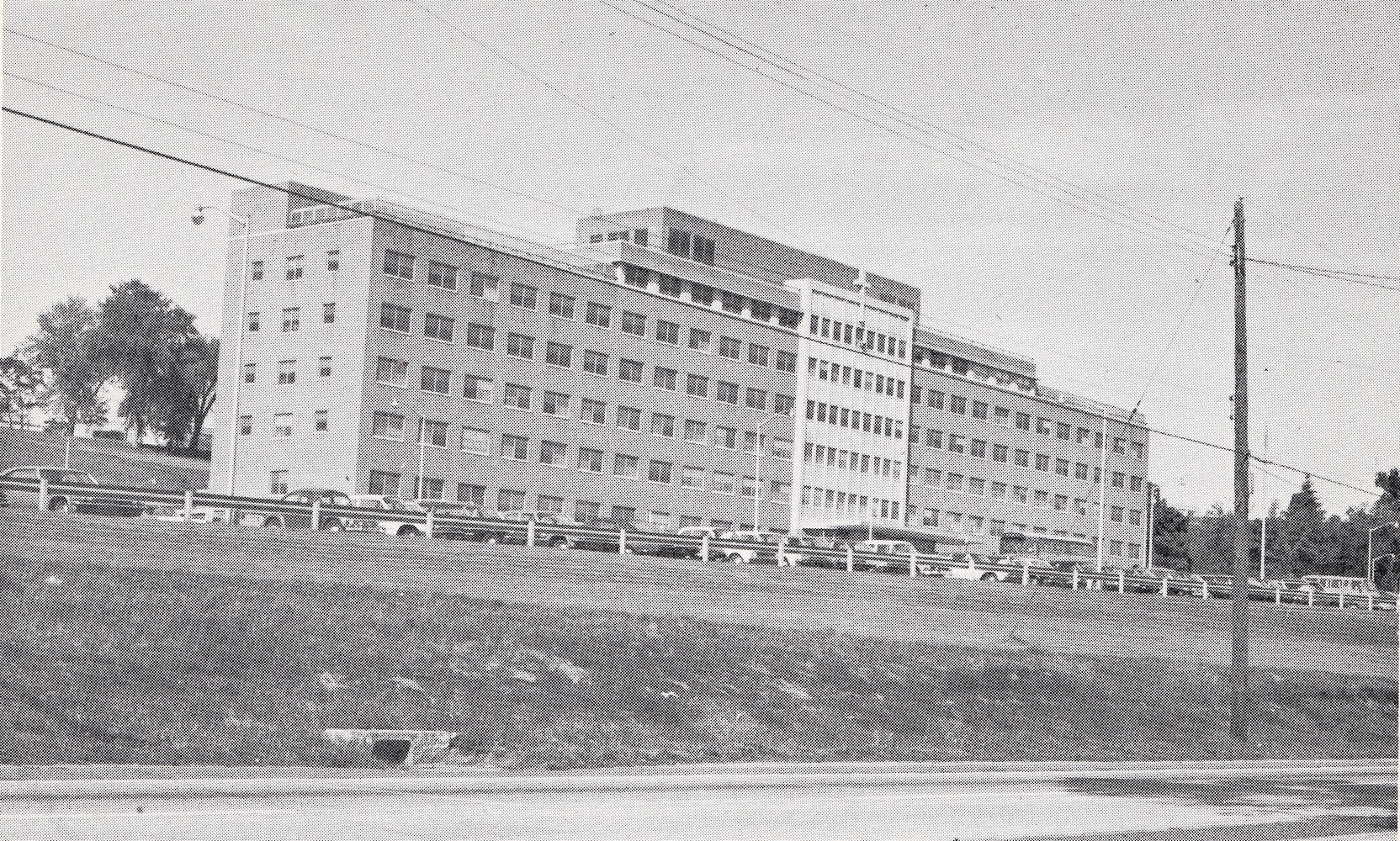
- Providence Hospital, as seen from Main Street (US-5), 1970

- Location within Massachusetts

Geography
- Location: 1233 Main St, Holyoke, Massachusetts, United States
- Coordinates: 42.165920°N 72.633928°W

Organization
- Care system: Private
- Type: Community, Behavioral and Substance Abuse

History
- Founded: November 7, 1873 (founded); December 17, 1892 (charter)

Links
- Website: www.mercycares.com/providence_behavioral_health_hospital
- Lists: Hospitals in Massachusetts

Providence Behavioral Health Hospital, formerly known as Providence Hospital, is a faith-based non-profit behavioral health and substance abuse medical center located in Holyoke, Massachusetts, providing non-emergency services. Founded in 1873 by the Sisters of Providence of Holyoke, Providence was originally the first full-service medical hospital in Holyoke, continuing until 1996 when it was converted to a psychiatric and behavioral health facility. In February 2020 the hospital announced it would cease all inpatient psychiatric services, citing a shortage of psychiatrists, effective June 30, 2020. The hospital will continue to maintain substance use disorder services as well as a methadone clinic.

The hospital's adjacent Catherine Horan Medical Building also houses medical practices, as well as the Holyoke branch of the Massachusetts Office of the Chief Medical Examiner.

== History ==
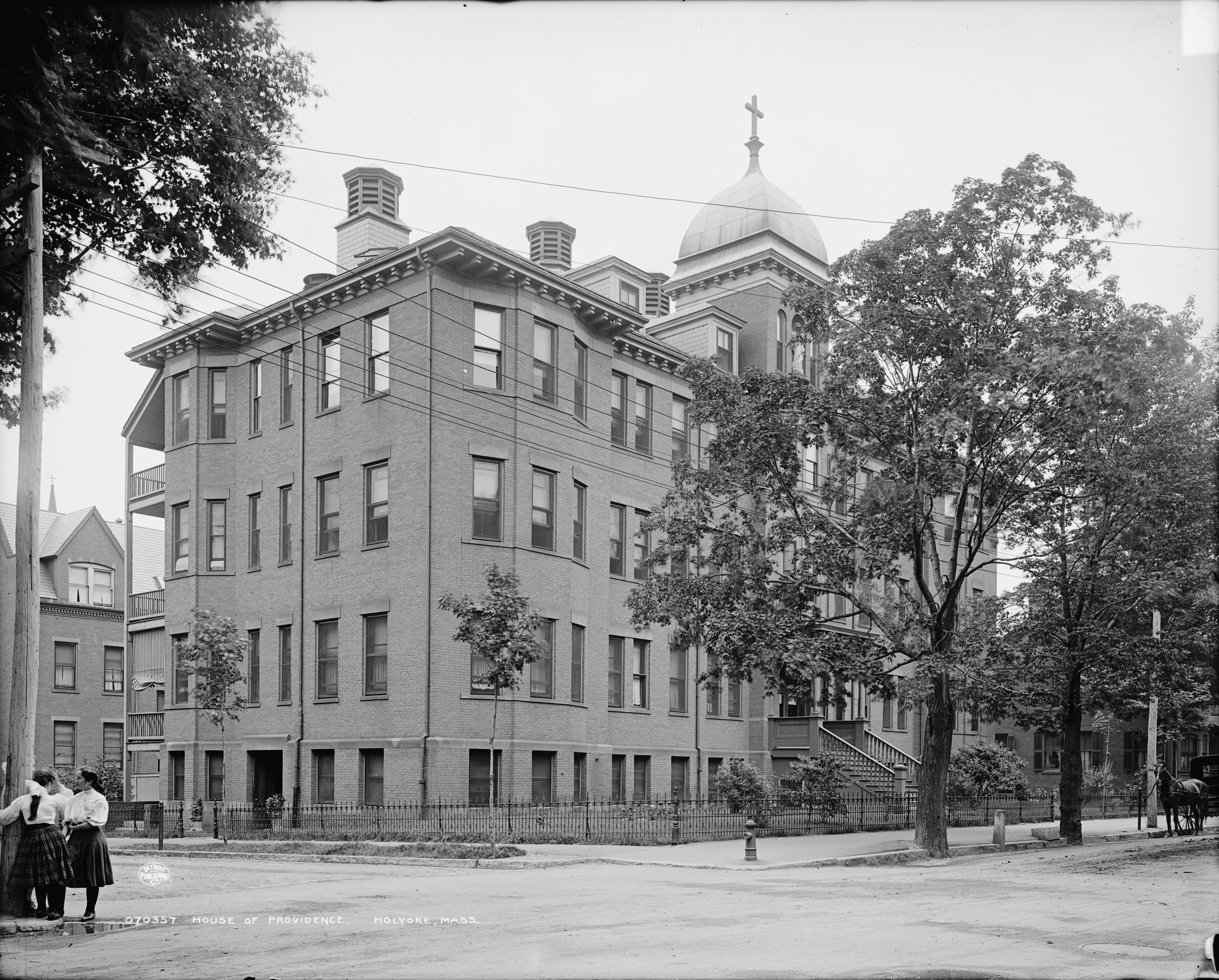
The former House of Providence Hospital, which stood at the corner of Dwight and Elm St in downtown Holyoke served patients from 1894 to 1958

The hospital was first founded by the Sisters of Providence on November 7, 1873, in a small dwelling in South Hadley Falls to aid the sick and needy. In 1894 the Sisters opened a modern medical hospital in Holyoke on the corners of Dwight and Elm Streets, which also featured their residence on the top floor; the facility would serve more than 200,000 patients in its 64 years of use.

The hospital's facility in downtown closed in June 1958 following the opening of its current facility in the month prior. The former facility was razed in the following year and the land leased to the city by the Diocese for additional downtown parking. The hospital would maintain a full emergency staff with medical specialists, surgeons, and an intensive care unit until 1996, when it closed and began transitioning into a behavioral care facility.
