= Ann Margaret O'Hara =

Ann Margaret O'Hara, SP
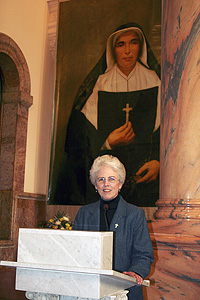
- In February 2006, Sr. Ann Margaret O'Hara announces the upcoming canonization of M. Theodore Guerin
- Born: Peggy Ann O'Hara; December 22, 1937 (age 88); Louisville, Kentucky
- Title: Superior general of the Sisters of Providence of Saint Mary-of-the-Woods
- Predecessor: Diane Ris SP
- Successor: Denise Wilkinson SP

Ann Margaret O'Hara, SP, (born 22 December 1937) is a former superior general of the Sisters of Providence of Saint Mary-of-the-Woods, Indiana, from 2001 to 2006. During her term, she made numerous changes to help the congregation plan for the future, including establishing a Mission Advisory Board and creating a process for long-range planning.

O'Hara and her administration founded Providence Cristo Rey High School in Indianapolis as a sponsored ministry of the congregation. She also oversaw the conversion of physical plant equipment at Saint Mary-of-the-Woods to use alternative fuels, including biodiesel.

O'Hara was Superior general of the congregation during the final stages in the canonization process of the Sisters of Providence foundress Saint Mother Theodore Guerin, who was declared a saint in the Roman Catholic Church in October 2006.

Prior to her term, she spent many years as dean of students at Immaculata College in Washington, DC. She has held numerous leadership roles, including Executive Secretary of St. Gabriel Province, Saint Mary-of-the-Woods College Dean of Admission and Vice President of Student Affairs, and Director of Program Services for the National Association of Church Personnel Administration.

In 2006 O'Hara decided not to pursue a second term as superior general. Currently, she serves as executive director of Women of Providence in Collaboration, following Barbara McMullen, CDP, in this position.

Catholic Church titles
Preceded by Diane Ris SP	Superior general of the Sisters of Providence of Saint Mary-of-the-Woods; 2001–2006	Succeeded by Denise Wilkinson SP
