= Ecclesiae Sanctae =

Motu proprio issued by Pope Paul VI

Ecclesiae Sanctae ([Governing] of the Holy Church) is an apostolic letter or motu proprio issued by Pope Paul VI on August 6, 1966. Paul wrote this letter on how to implement the Vatican Council, especially as regards the conciliar documents Christus Dominus (On the Pastoral Office of Bishops), Presbyterorum Ordinis (On the Life and Ministry of Priests), Perfectae Caritatis (On the Adaptation and Renewal of Religious Life), and Ad Gentes (On the Missionary Activity of the Church).

== Provisions ==
The document announced the provision that all bishops, archbishops and Curial officials, from October 11, 1966, were deemed to "voluntarily" offer their resignation to the pope on their 75th birthday. With this provision, all bishops who were appointed by Pope Pius XI and a large part of the bishops who were appointed by Pope Pius XII lost their jurisdiction. Four years later, this innovation was followed by the motu proprio Ingravescentem aetatem, which excluded cardinals over eighty years of age from participating in a Papal conclave. Both documents replaced all pre-conciliar documents.

Another provision of Ecclesiae Sanctae encouraged episcopal conferences and patriarchal synods to "enact regulations and publish norms for the bishops in order to obtain a suitable distribution of the clergy," both in their own area and for the benefit of mission countries. Seminarians are to be imbued with a concern for the global mission of the Church, and not only for the mission of their own diocese. An example of implementation of this is the Archdiocese of St. Louis (USA) sending 45 priests to Bolivia over the next 60 years. Vatican II's call for all Catholics to be missionary disciples was advanced further by Paul VI's Apostolic Letter of 1975, Evangelii Nuntiandi.

Ecclasiae Sanctae, in line with the Council's decrees, required that a council of priests be established and recommended that a pastoral council – of clerics, religious, and laity – also be established. Both are advisory to the bishop and have only a consultative vote.
