= Sisters of Providence of Holyoke =

Catholic congregation

Sisters of Providence of Holyoke, Massachusetts
- Formation: December 17, 1892
- Type: Religious Institute
- Headquarters: Holyoke, Massachusetts
- President: Kathleen Popko, SP
- Website: www.sisofprov.org

The Sisters of Providence of Holyoke, Massachusetts, are a congregation of Roman Catholic religious sisters founded in 1892.

== History ==
In November 1873, four Sisters of Charity from the House of Providence in Kingston, Ontario, Canada, came to Holyoke in Western Massachusetts to care for the sick poor, most of whom were immigrants laboring in the city's paper mills. Holyoke was a young, rapidly growing industrial city with cotton, satin and thread mills. These employed hundreds of immigrants, especially those from Ireland and Scotland.

A great dam was built across the Connecticut at Holyoke. Hundreds of laborers were employed in its construction. The immigrants and mill employees were lodged in company houses, badly constructed, unsanitary and overcrowded. Disease, especially typhoid fever, was rampant. Since the city had neither hospital nor an almshouse, during illness these poor people received little or no care. There were no homes for the aged or infirm, or an orphanage for homeless children. Rev. Patrick J. Harkins, pastor of St. Jerome's Church, the only Catholic Church in the city, was aware of the needs of his poor parishioners and sought to address them. In September 1873 two Sisters of Charity of the House of Providence arrived from their Mother House in Kingston, Ontario, Canada. The two, Sister Mary de Chantal and Sister Mary Elizabeth were on a begging trip and seeking his permission to solicit funds from his parish for their poor back home. Harkins had studied under Sr. Mary Elizabeth’s brother, Fr. Stafford, at Regiopolis College in Kingston. He asked that they open a charitable mission in the city.

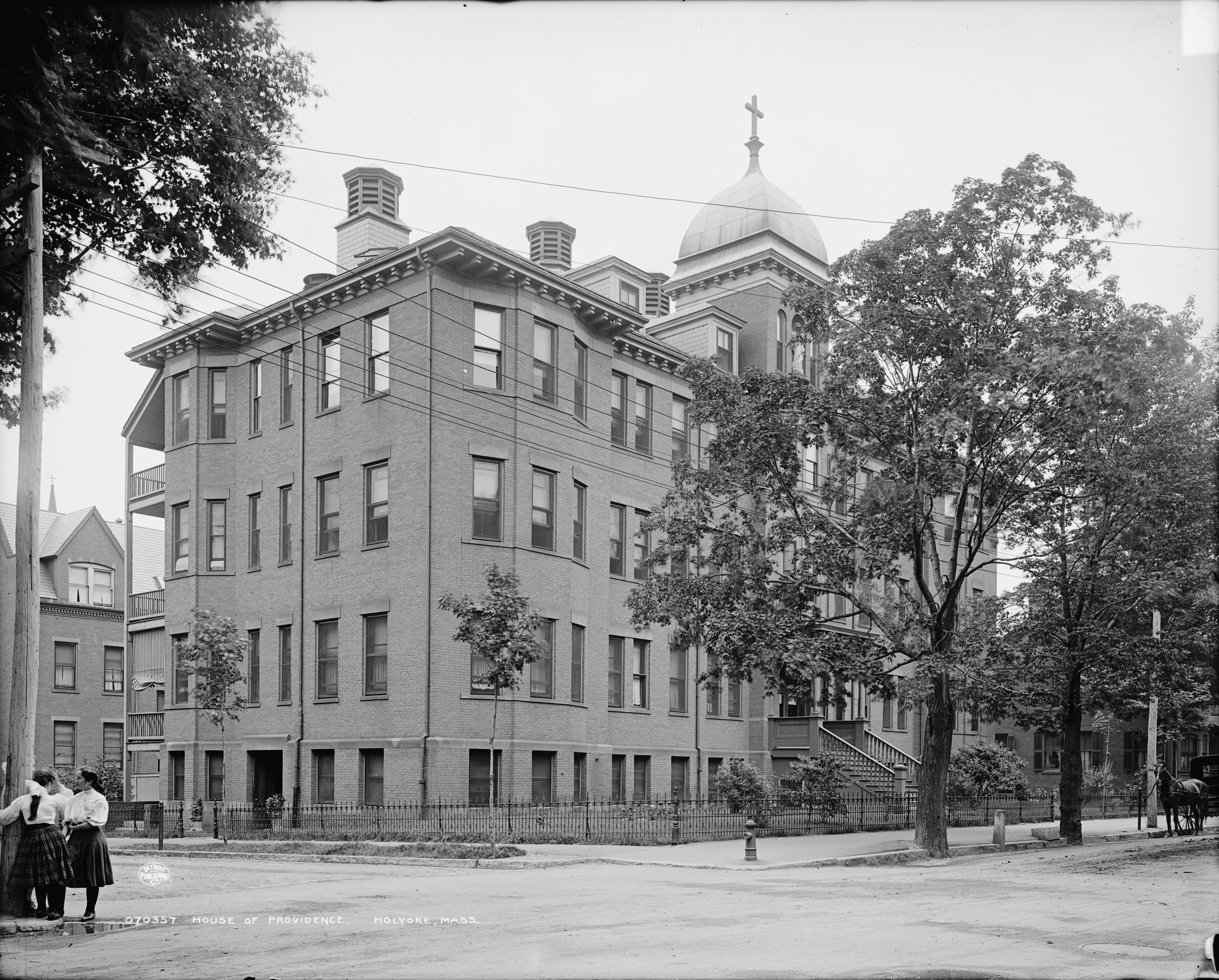
House of Providence, Holyoke, Massachusetts (c. 1910)

The sisters’ Reverend Mother Mary John and Mother Mary Edward, first assistant, visited Holyoke on September 23, 1873. They accepted Holyoke as their first mission. On November 7, 1873, four sisters arrived to establish the Holyoke mission, settling in their first House of Providence, located on the other side of the Connecticut River in South Hadley Falls. They crossed the river by rowboat to visit the needy in Holyoke. Within one week, Sisters Mary Edward, Mary Mount Carmel, Mary of the Cross, and Mary Patrick welcomed their first orphan, 11-year old Edward Reilly. It was not long after that before the city almoner was sending the city's needy and the infirm to the sisters for care and shelter.

Soon their house was filled to capacity and only the very sick and friendless could be admitted. In 1874, the Sisters moved from South Hadley Falls to a new House of Providence in Holyoke. The House of Providence functioned as a hospital, orphanage, home for the elderly and convent.

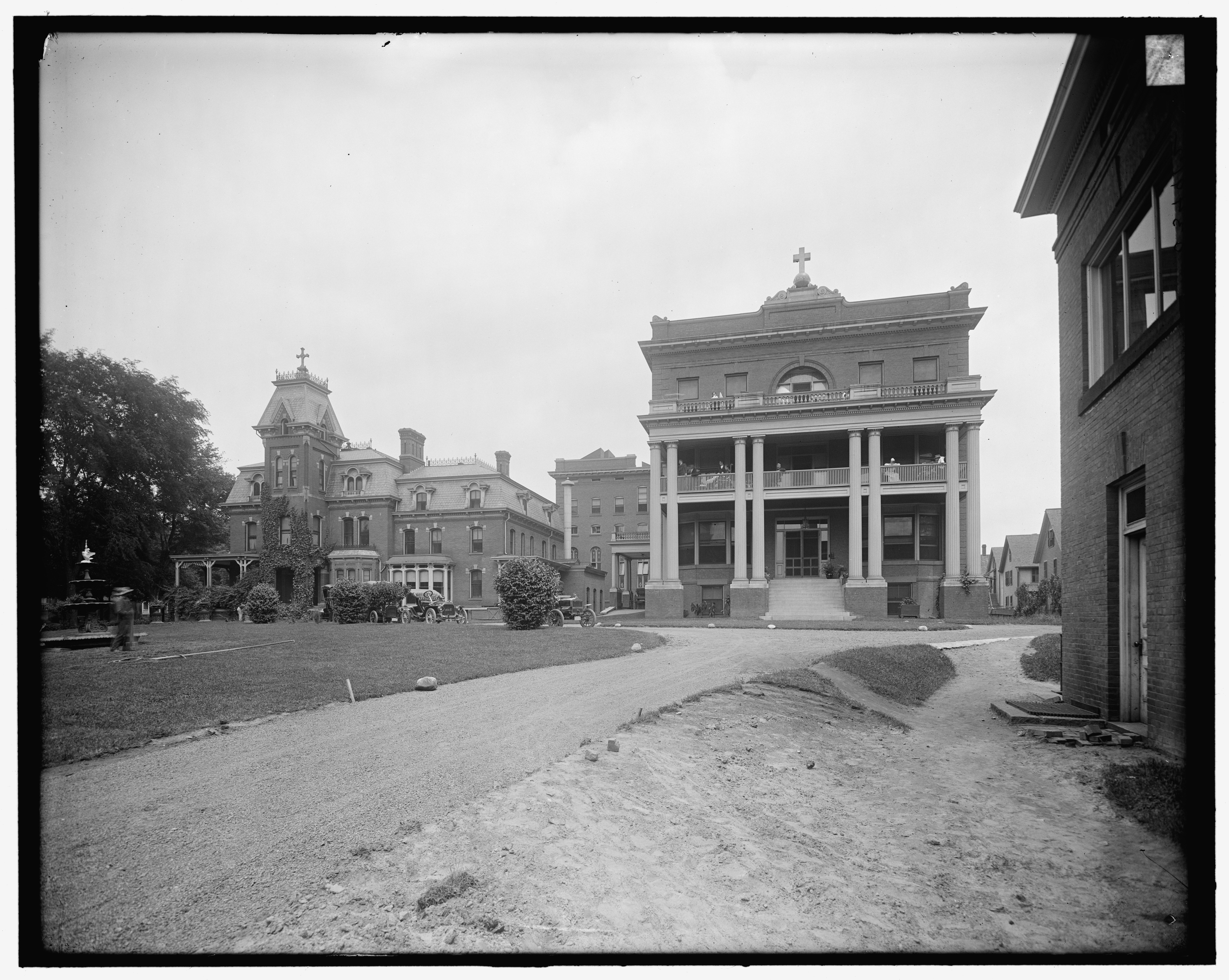
Mercy Hospital Springfield Mass 1900-1910

Providence Hospital, Holyoke's first full-service medical facility was founded in 1873. Mercy Hospital in Springfield, the first Catholic hospital in western Massachusetts. developed from a Holyoke mission the following year. Saint Vincent Hospital in Worcester was founded in 1893.

The work of the Sisters of Providence, as all in Holyoke called them, rapidly developed. Soon they were not only caring for the orphaned, the aged, and the infirm at the House of Providence, but for the sick poor in their homes where the sisters spent nights with the dying and preparing the dead for burial. To help support themselves and their ministries, the sisters made and sold altar breads, church linens, vestments and burial robes. This last work was a major source of income for the House of Providence until around 1920. In the summer of 1875 Father Harkins sent a request to Kingston for the Sisters to take charge of the Boys School at St. Jerome's Institute. Teaching was not one of the works for which the sisters’ congregation had been founded, but not finding it incompatible with their Rule, and wishing to cooperate with the pastor accepted this new work on August 12, 1875. Sister Mary of Providence, Sister Mary Berchmans and four novices arrived from Kingston to begin the new teaching ministry. As no convent had been provided for the sisters teaching in the school, they resided at the House of Providence and frequently helped care for the orphans, aged and infirm in their free time from school, as well as relieving on night duty or spending their nights with the dying. With true missionary spirit, these pioneer sisters generously and courageously fulfilled their vocation as servants of the poor.

By 1890 the Rev. Dr. Thomas D. Beaven, acting for the Right Rev. Patrick Thomas O'Reilly, Bishop of Springfield of which Holyoke is a part, petitioned Rome for the sisters to become a separate diocesan Congregation, separate from the Mother House in Kingston. On the day of Bishop O’Reilly's death, May 28, 1892 notice arrived that Rome had granted that permission, and on August 12 Father Beaven was appointed to succeed as bishop. Following his predecessor's plan, sisters who wished were permitted to remain members of the Kingston Community, and on August 13, 1892, fourteen of their number bade farewell to their companions in Holyoke and returned to Kingston. The 30 remaining sisters became the nucleus for the new diocesan Community. And, on August 17, 1892 a provisional government was established with Mother Mary of Providence (in secular life Catherine Horan), as its first major superior.

The sisters’ new Community was incorporated under the laws of the Commonwealth as the Sisters of Providence, Holyoke, Massachusetts. Their charter, dated December 17, 1892, was granted for “the establishment and maintaining of the school for the education of children; establishing and maintaining a hospital for the cure of the sick; assisting the poor and destitute people; and teaching and fitting young women for the Order of the Sisters of Providence and maintaining the same.”

In the next 15 years, the sisters, under the able leadership of Mother Mary of Providence established 20 works of charity. Mother Mary served as teacher, principal, nurse, administrator and religious leader. By her death in 1943, the Sisters of Providence had made sharp inroads into alleviating the social needs of Western Massachusetts. In their various missions, the works of the Community were continuing to flourish throughout the Springfield Diocese, which at that time include Worcester in central Massachusetts. The Sisters ministries included several hospitals and nursing schools, an orphanage, nursing homes, a residence for working girls and a home for unwed mothers. Many others of their ministries also aided the poor and needy.

In 1950, the diocese was divided into two diocese: the newly established Worcester Diocese was headed by Bishop John Wright, and the Springfield Diocese by Bishop Christopher J. Weldon. The need to rebuild many of the institutions operated by the Sisters of Providence was a major concern. Some of the buildings were more than 50 years old, while others needed expansion or modernization. In the Springfield Diocese, Bishop Weldon raised funds to add a new wing to Farren Memorial Hospital in Montague City, and to rebuild Providence Hospital in Holyoke. Funds were also raised to replace the original Brightside buildings in Holyoke with Our Lady of Providence Children's Center in West Springfield, the Guild of the Holy Child in Westfield moved into its new building, and in Worcester, there was a dedication for a new Saint Vincent Hospital.

During these same years, the Community took steps to provide the advanced educations the Sisters needed in order to assume significant roles within these modern, sophisticated health and human service agencies. A House of Studies was opened in the Boston area for the many sisters who began to pursue professional studies. Many of the newer members of the Community were sent to the House of Studies or to Marillac College, a sister formation college in St. Louise, Missouri, where they obtained college degrees.

In 1967, the Sisters of Providence assumed management of the Diocese of Raleigh's St. Joseph of the Pines Hospital, a 75-bed acute care facility, built of the site of the 1928 Pine Needles Golf Resort Hotel. hospital and added Home Care services. One year later, SJP shifted its mission from acute medical care to long-term care. The Sisters acquired land on Camp Easter Road in 1990 and began the development of a skilled nursing center, The Health Center, and new residential living community, Belle Meade. The Health Center opened in 1996; Belle Meade in 1999. The Coventry assisted living facility, opened in 2008 and is located between The Health Center and Belle Meade.

== Present Day ==
The sisters legacy is visible in the Sisters of Providence Health System, a member of Trinity Health-New England, whose parent organization Trinity Health is the second largest Catholic health System in the U. S. In addition, the sisters sponsor Genesis Spiritual Life Center, and Providence Ministries for the Needy.

Finding the motherhouse too large for their needs, the sisters converted it into "Providence Place at Ingleside", an independent living community with 119 units for those over age 55. Residents are welcome to enjoy and gather in the large and ornate chapel for daily mass and prayer. In addition, the chapel is open for concerts several times a year.

Also on the same campus, "Mary’s Meadow" at Providence Place offers care to people needing long and short term rehabilitative services.

== Sources ==
Sisters of Providence archival materials housed in the Sisters of Providence Archives in Holyoke, Mass.
