= Religious sister =

Woman who has taken public vows in a religious institute

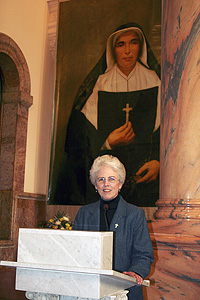
The former Superior General of the Sisters of Providence of Saint Mary-of-the-Woods, Sister Ann Margaret O'Hara, SP, in 2006. In the background a painting of the congregation's foundress, Mother Théodore Guérin.

A religious sister (abbreviated: Sr.) is a Christian woman who has taken public vows in a religious congregation dedicated to apostolic works. Though often referred to as nuns, they are canonically distinct. Nuns, religious sisters and canonesses all use the term "Sister" as a form of address. Religious sisters are found in various traditions of Christianity, particularly Catholicism, Evangelical Lutheranism and Anglicanism. In the Catholic Church, religious sisters are associated with a religious institute.

== History ==
Until the 16th century, Catholic religious orders in the Western world made vows that were perpetual and solemn. In 1521, Pope Leo X allowed tertiaries of religious orders to take simple vows and live a more active life dedicated to charitable works. This provision was rejected by Pope Pius V in 1566 and 1568. Early efforts by women such as Angela Merici, founder of the Ursulines (1535), and Jane Frances de Chantal, founder with Francis de Sales of the Order of the Visitation of Holy Mary (1610), were halted as the cloister was imposed by Church authorities.

Into the 17th century, Catholic Church custom did not allow women to leave the cloister if they had taken religious vows. Female members of the mendicant orders (Dominicans, Augustinians, Carmelites, and Poor Clares) continued to observe the same enclosed life as members of the monastic orders. The work of religious women was confined to what could be carried on within the walls of a monastery, either teaching boarding students within the cloister or nursing the sick in hospitals attached to the monastery.

Mary Ward was an early proponent of women with religious vows living an active life outside the cloister, based on the apostolic life of the Jesuits. There was to be no enclosure, no common recitation of the Liturgy of the Hours, and no religious habit. In 1609 she established a religious community at Saint-Omer and opened schools for girls. Her efforts led to the founding of the Institute of the Blessed Virgin Mary, also known as the Sisters of Loreto (IBVM). Her congregation was suppressed in 1630, but has continued to exist in some countries in various forms.

Other Catholic women's groups with simple vows continued to be founded, at times with the approval of local bishops. Vincent de Paul insisted that the Daughters of Charity of Saint Vincent de Paul, which he founded, would have no convent but the hospital, no chapel but the parish church, and no cloister but the streets. Not technically a religious congregation, they are a society of apostolic life and renew their vows annually. The 19th century saw the proliferation of women's congregations engaged in education, religious instruction, and medical and social works, along with missionary work in Africa and Asia. After nearly three centuries, in 1900 Pope Leo XIII, by his constitution Conditae a Christo, gave his approval to women's congregations with simple vows.

The 1917 Code of Canon Law of the Catholic Church reserved the term "nun" (Latin: monialis) for women religious who took solemn vows or who, while being allowed in some places to take simple vows, belonged to institutes whose vows were normally solemn. They lived under cloister, "papal enclosure", and recited the Liturgy of the Hours in common. The Code used the word "sister" (Latin: soror) for members of institutes for women which it classified as "congregations"; and for "nuns" and "sisters" jointly it used the Latin word religiosae (women religious).

== Contemporary developments ==
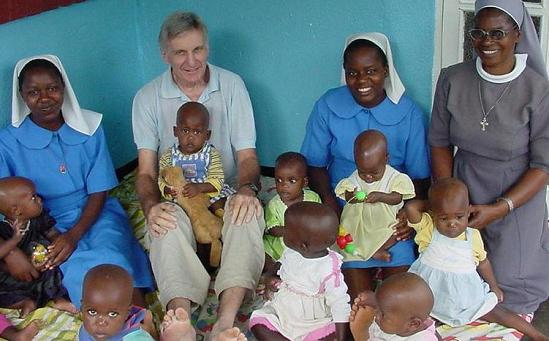
Sisters (with chaplain) working at Mother of Peace AIDS orphanage in Zimbabwe, to prepare for opening another orphanage

The bishops of the Second Vatican Council, in their decree on the religious life Perfectae Caritatis, asked all religious to examine their charism, as defined by their rule and founder, in light of the needs of the modern world. Some religious who had led a more contemplative life responded to modern needs of the apostolate outside the monastic walls. The same document stated that in a religious community of sisters, there should only be "one class of Sisters", except where there were special circumstances, and the only distinctions between sisters should relate to the types of vocational role they undertake.

The Council also noted the connection between the work of religious brothers and sisters and the apostolate of lay people:

"Religious Brothers and Sisters should value the apostolic works of the laity and willingly devote themselves to promoting lay enterprises".

The Council also entrusted to all clergy a role in helping religious men and women, "that they may persevere in the grace of their vocations".

Throughout his post-conciliar document Ecclesiae Sanctae (1967), Pope Paul VI used the word "nun" to refer to women with solemn vows. The 1983 Code of Canon Law uses the expression "monastery of nuns". The new code did not force traditional orders that were taking on works outside the monastery into uniformity. In response to Vatican II, there has been "vigorous discussion among monastics as regards what kinds of work and life-styles are genuinely compatible with monastic life".

In Evangelical Lutheranism and Anglicanism, religious sisters take vows of poverty, chastity, and obedience, although they are differentiated from nuns who live a cloistered life in a convent. Examples include the Communität Casteller Ring, an order of Evangelical-Lutheran sisters in the Benedictine tradition, as well as the Daughters of Mary, an Evangelical-Lutheran religious order devoted to the Blessed Virgin Mary. These stand in contrast to Evangelical Lutheran nuns who live in convents, such as Isenhagen Abbey.

== See also ==
- Catholic sisters and nuns in the United States
- Consecrated life
- Religious brother
- Vocational discernment in the Catholic Church
