= Veale Township, Daviess County, Indiana =

Veale Township
- Township
- Location of Veale Township in Daviess County
- Coordinates: 38°33′59″N 87°11′04″W
- Country: United States
- State: Indiana
- County: Daviess

Government
  - Type: Indiana township

Area
  - Total: 29.67 sq mi (76.8 km^{2})
  - Land: 29.11 sq mi (75.4 km^{2})
  - Water: 0.57 sq mi (1.5 km^{2})
- Elevation: 430 ft (130 m)

Population (2020)
  - Total: 1,130
  - Density: 38.8/sq mi (15.0/km^{2})
- FIPS code: 18-78722
- GNIS feature ID: 453953

Veale Township is one of ten townships in Daviess County, Indiana. As of the 2020 census, its population was 1,130 (up from 1,095 at 2010) and it contained 449 housing units.

Historical population
Census	Pop.	Note	%±
1890	1,083		—
1900	1,125		3.9%
1910	1,059		−5.9%
1920	1,015		−4.2%
1930	916		−9.8%
1940	898		−2.0%
1950	776		−13.6%
1960	693		−10.7%
1970	652		−5.9%
1980	682		4.6%
1990	779		14.2%
2000	1,041		33.6%
2010	1,095		5.2%
2020	1,130		3.2%
Source: US Decennial Census

== History ==
Veale Township was organized on 12 May 1817 at the first meeting of the Daviess County Commissioners. and named for James Veale; one of the township's first residents, Veale had settled there in 1807 or 1808. In the county's early history, Veale Township was an industrial leader: within its boundaries were the first sawmill and the first distillery in Daviess County.

== Geography ==
According to the 2010 census, the township has a total area of 29.67 square miles (76.8 km^{2}), of which 29.11 square miles (75.4 km^{2}) (or 98.11%) is land and 0.57 square miles (1.5 km^{2}) (or 1.92%) is water. Horseshoe Pond and Jackson Pond are in this township.

=== Unincorporated towns ===
- Cumback
- Sandy Hook

(This list is based on USGS data and may include former settlements.)

=== Adjacent townships ===
- Washington Township (north)
- Harrison Township (east)
- Jefferson Township, Pike County (southeast)
- Washington Township, Pike County (southwest)
- Harrison Township, Knox County (west)

=== Major highways ===
- I-69
- SR 57

=== Cemeteries ===
The township contains one cemetery, Bethel.
