= Steele Township, Daviess County, Indiana =

Steele Township
- Township
- Location of Steele Township in Daviess County
- Coordinates: 38°46′27″N 87°11′05″W
- Country: United States
- State: Indiana
- County: Daviess

Government
  - Type: Indiana township

Area
  - Total: 43.39 sq mi (112.4 km^{2})
  - Land: 42.76 sq mi (110.7 km^{2})
  - Water: 0.63 sq mi (1.6 km^{2})
- Elevation: 449 ft (137 m)

Population (2020)
  - Total: 910
  - Density: 21/sq mi (8.2/km^{2})
- FIPS code: 18-72890
- GNIS feature ID: 453871

Steele Township is one of ten townships in Daviess County, Indiana. As of the 2010 census, its population was 910 (up from 903 at 2010) and it contained 402 housing units.

Historical population
Census	Pop.	Note	%±
1890	1,599		—
1900	1,992		24.6%
1910	1,852		−7.0%
1920	1,654		−10.7%
1930	1,527		−7.7%
1940	1,428		−6.5%
1950	1,206		−15.5%
1960	1,125		−6.7%
1970	988		−12.2%
1980	981		−0.7%
1990	895		−8.8%
2000	930		3.9%
2010	903		−2.9%
2020	910		0.8%
Source: US Decennial Census

== History ==
Steele Township was organized in 1835 out of what had been northern Washington Township. It was settled later than most other Daviess County townships—the earliest settlers in the county were primarily hillfolk from Tennessee, Kentucky, and the Carolinas; they were unfamiliar with the bottomland prevalent in the township, and folklore of the day held that malaria was far more prevalent in lowlands. The first settlement was made around 1820; in the township's earliest years, it was isolated by poor transportation, but the construction of the Wabash and Erie Canal led to an economic boom for a short time, before the canal was abandoned.

== Geography ==
According to the 2010 census, the township has a total area of 43.39 square miles (112.4 km^{2}), of which 42.76 square miles (110.7 km^{2}) (or 98.55%) is land and 0.63 square miles (1.6 km^{2}) (or 1.45%) is water. Melton Pond is in this township.

=== Cities and towns ===
- Plainville

=== Adjacent townships ===
- Elmore Township (northeast)
- Bogard Township (east)
- Washington Township (south)
- Vigo Township, Knox County (northwest)

=== Major highways ===
- SR 57
- SR 358

=== Cemeteries ===
The township contains one cemetery, Plainville.
