= Old School Privy =

- U.S. National Register of Historic Places
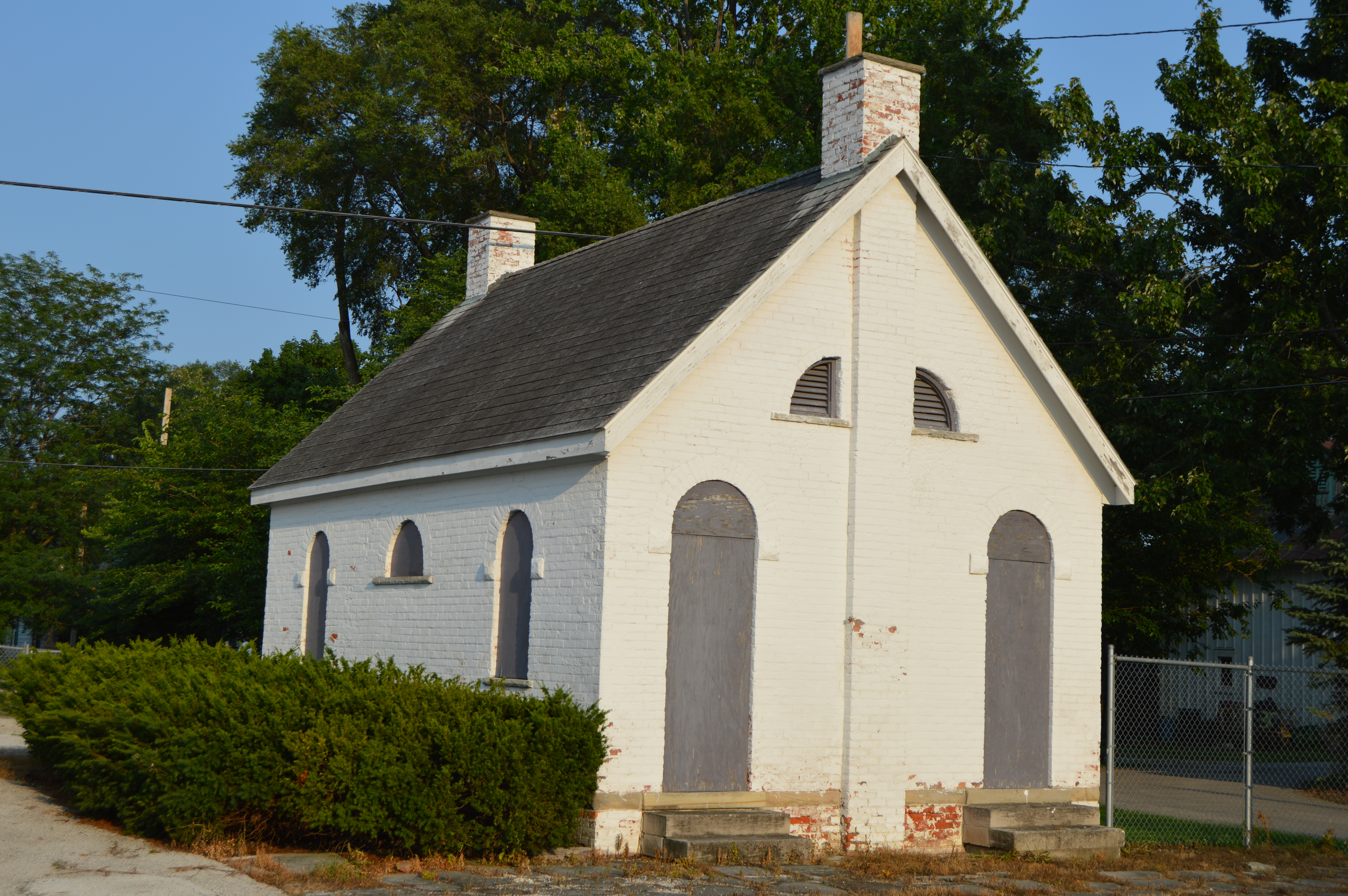
- Western and northern sides

- Location within Ohio Location within the United States
- Location: 310 Main St., Genoa, Ohio
- Coordinates: 41°30′54″N 83°21′34″W
- Area: 0.1 acres (0.040 ha)
- Built: 1870
- Architectural style: Romanesque Revival
- NRHP reference No.: 75001515
- Added to NRHP: July 31, 1975

The Old School Privy is a historic outhouse in the village of Genoa, Ohio, United States. Constructed in the 1870s, it has the unusual distinction of being both a public toilet and an official historic site.

Incorporated in 1868, Genoa quickly sought to demonstrate its residents' civic pride through the construction of fine buildings. Among these was its first schoolhouse, which the residents built two years later; it was significant enough to the community that they also erected an architecturally distinctive public toilet adjacent to it in the same year. Public toilets were once common near crossroads in Ohio and other Northwest Territory states, but architecture comparable to the Old School Privy was virtually unknown for such humble structures. In later years, the building was converted for use as an incinerator.

Built of brick, the privy features elements of limestone. It is a rectangular building with a gabled roof and a chimney at each end; two doors pierce the front, while two full windows and a small semicircular light are placed in the side. Rather than being built simply functionally without unnecessary elements, the building features the high styling of Romanesque Revival architecture, such as rusticated stone trim and decorative stonework in the arches that top the entrances. Stonework is used in many of the components that were expected to see heavy use, including the steps, the windowsills, the thresholds, and the water table.

In 1975, the Old School Privy was listed on the National Register of Historic Places, qualifying because of its place in local history. One of 29 such locations in Ottawa County, it was the seventh to be given this distinction. Other outhouses have been added to the Register as contributing properties to larger designations, such as the outhouses associated with the Old Union Church at Alfordsville in southwestern Indiana, but very few public toilets such as the Old School Privy or Colorado's Bear Lake Comfort Station have individually been named to the Register.
