= Indiana State Road 358 =

State highway in Indiana, United States

State Road 358
- SR 358 highlighted in red

Route information
- Maintained by INDOT
- Length: 12.146 mi (19.547 km)

Major junctions
- West end: SR 67 near Edwardsport
- East end: SR 58 near Elnora

Location
- Country: United States
- State: Indiana
- Counties: Knox, Daviess

Highway system
- Indiana State Highway System; Interstate; US; State; Scenic
← SR 357	→ SR 362

State Road 358 in the U.S. state of Indiana is an east–west state highway in Knox and Daviess counties, covering a distance of about 12 miles.

== Route description ==
State Road 358 starts at State Road 67 near the small town of Edwardsport and runs east to Plainville. It is then concurrent with State Road 57 and runs northeast for about 3 miles (4.8 km) before striking east again for the last two miles (3 km) of its length, where it meets State Road 58 south of Elnora.

== Major intersections ==
County	Location	mi	km	Destinations	Notes
Knox	Edwardsport	0.000	0.000	SR 67 – Vincennes, Spencer	Western terminus of SR 358
Daviess	Plainville	6.626	10.664	SR 57 south – Washington	Southern end of SR 57 concurrency
Daviess	Elmore Township	10.174	16.373	SR 57 north – Elnora	Northern terminus of SR 57 concurrency
Daviess	Elmore Township	12.146	19.547	SR 58 – Elnora, Odon	Eastern terminus of SR 358
1.000 mi = 1.609 km; 1.000 km = 0.621 mi: Concurrency terminus
