= Sandy Hook (disambiguation) =

Sandy Hook is a barrier spit along the Atlantic coast of New Jersey.

Sandy Hook may also refer to:

== Places ==
=== United States ===
- Sandy Hook, Connecticut, a district within the town of Newtown, Connecticut
- Sandy Hook, Indiana, unincorporated community
- Sandy Hook, Kentucky, a city in Elliott County
- Sandy Hook, Maryland, an unincorporated community in Washington County
- Sandy Hook, Mississippi, an unincorporated community
- Sandy Hook, Missouri, an unincorporated community
- Sandy Hook, Virginia, an unincorporated community in Goochland County
- Sandy Hook, Wisconsin, a Census Designated Place in Grant County
- Sandy Hook, Missouri, on the National Register of Historic Places listings in Missouri, Counties L–N

=== Canada ===
- Sandy Hook, a community in the town of Uxbridge, Ontario
- Sandy Hook, a community in the Rural Municipality of Gimli, Manitoba
- Sandy Hook, a neighborhood in the District of Sechelt, British Columbia

=== Other places ===
- Sandy Hook Island, an island in Western Australia's Recherche Archipelago

== Other uses ==
- Sandy Hook Elementary School shooting, a mass murder in 2012 in Newtown, Connecticut
- "Sandy's hook" or "Sandy's left hook", the "left hook" or "left turn" (westerly movement) of Hurricane Sandy in 2012, a rare event for a hurricane near the northern United States
