= Epsom (disambiguation) =

Epsom is a town in Surrey, England. Related to that are:

- Epsom (UK Parliament constituency), a former constituency
- Epsom railway station, serving Epsom
- Epsom College, an independent school in Epsom
- Epsom Downs, an area of chalk upland near Epsom
  - Epsom Downs Racecourse, on Epsom Downs
    - Epsom Derby, a prestigious horse race run on Epsom Downs Racecourse
    - Epsom Oaks, another horse race run on Epsom Downs Racecourse
    - Epsom Downs (play), set on Epsom Derby day
  - Epsom Downs railway station, serving Epsom Downs
- Epsom salts (magnesium sulphate), named for a saline spring in Epsom
- Epsom and Ewell, the borough including Epsom
- Epsom riot, a disturbance by Canadian soldiers in 1919
- Epsom Wells, a play written by Thomas Shadwell in 1673

== Other places ==
=== Australia ===
- Epsom, Queensland, a locality in the Isaac Region
- Epsom, Victoria, Australia
  - Epsom railway station, Victoria
- Epsom Handicap, a Group 1 Australian Thoroughbred horse race run at Randwick Racecourse, Sydney

=== New Zealand ===
- Epsom (New Zealand electorate)
- Epsom, New Zealand

=== United States ===
- Epsom, Indiana, United States
- Epsom, New Hampshire, United States

== Other uses ==
- Operation Epsom, the British attempt of the capture of Caen

== See also ==
- Epsom House, an historic building, now an entertainment venue, in Tasmania, Australia
- Epson, a Japanese electronics company
