= Harrison Township, Daviess County, Indiana =

Harrison Township
- Township
- Location of Harrison Township in Daviess County
- Coordinates: 38°34′06″N 87°04′52″W
- Country: United States
- State: Indiana
- County: Daviess

Government
  - Type: Indiana township

Area
  - Total: 32.17 sq mi (83.3 km^{2})
  - Land: 30.34 sq mi (78.6 km^{2})
  - Water: 1.83 sq mi (4.7 km^{2})
- Elevation: 548 ft (167 m)

Population (2020)
  - Total: 689
  - Density: 22.7/sq mi (8.77/km^{2})
- FIPS code: 18-31702
- GNIS feature ID: 453382

Harrison Township is one of ten townships in Daviess County, Indiana. As of the 2020 census, its population was 689 (down from 696 at 2010) and it contained 308 housing units.

Historical population
Census	Pop.	Note	%±
1890	1,300		—
1900	1,154		−11.2%
1910	1,109		−3.9%
1920	1,074		−3.2%
1930	867		−19.3%
1940	778		−10.3%
1950	755		−3.0%
1960	525		−30.5%
1970	485		−7.6%
1980	600		23.7%
1990	544		−9.3%
2000	673		23.7%
2010	696		3.4%
2020	689		−1.0%
Source: US Decennial Census

== History ==
Harrison Township was organized in June 1841 out of parts of Reave and Veale townships. Its first settlers were Lewis and William Jones, who came from South Carolina in 1812 and were soon joined by many other families from the Palmetto State.

The Glendale Ridge Archaeological Site was listed on the National Register of Historic Places in 1985.

== Geography ==
According to the 2010 census, the township has a total area of 32.17 square miles (83.3 km^{2}), of which 30.34 square miles (78.6 km^{2}) (or 94.31%) is land and 1.83 square miles (4.7 km^{2}) (or 5.69%) is water.

=== Unincorporated towns ===
- Glendale
- Hudsonville

(This list is based on USGS data and may include former settlements.)

=== Adjacent townships ===
- Barr Township (northeast)
- Reeve Township (east)
- Boone Township, Dubois County (southeast)
- Jefferson Township, Pike County (southwest)
- Veale Township (west)
- Washington Township (northwest)

=== Major highways ===
- SR 257

=== Cemeteries ===
The township contains three cemeteries: East Union, Ebenezer and Saint Patricks Glencoe.
