= Hudsonville =

Hudsonville may refer to the following places:

- Hudsonville, Indiana, an unincorporated community
- Hudsonville, Michigan, a city
- Hudsonville, Mississippi, an unincorporated community
