= Cornettsville =

Cornettsville may refer to a place in the United States:

- Cornettsville, Indiana
- Cornettsville, Kentucky
