= The Indiana Theater =

The Indiana Theater is a theatre located at 419 E. Main Street, Washington, Indiana. Built in 1926, it features period architecture, ornate molded plaster capitals, decorated beams, a full featured stage, period sconce lighting, a full service concession area, and large lobby.

In November 2011, an informal preservation group, The Friends of the Indiana Theater, was formed to try to purchase the property and preserve it. The group began to incorporate in March, 2012 as a 501C3. Future intent is to develop and operate as a not-for-profit with the mission of reopening the building as a cultural center providing a venue for live entertainment in the form of musical performances, stage plays, informal dining, training facility, exposition center, and or public meeting place. The more general mission is to promote downtown Washington, its businesses, culture, and the historical heritage of Washington and Daviess County.

Originally opened in 1928 as a one screen stage theater featuring a balcony, this building was eventually "twinned" (the balcony becoming the second auditorium) and after sitting empty for 4 years has now undergone a substantial upgrade to include All Digital Projection & 5.1 Dolby Digital Surround Sound. It is now once again featuring First-Run movies. The main level features the "Grand" Auditorium, while the upstairs has the "Balcony" Auditorium which also features Stadium Seating.
