= Old Union Church and Cemetery =

Historic church in Indiana, United States

- U.S. National Register of Historic Places
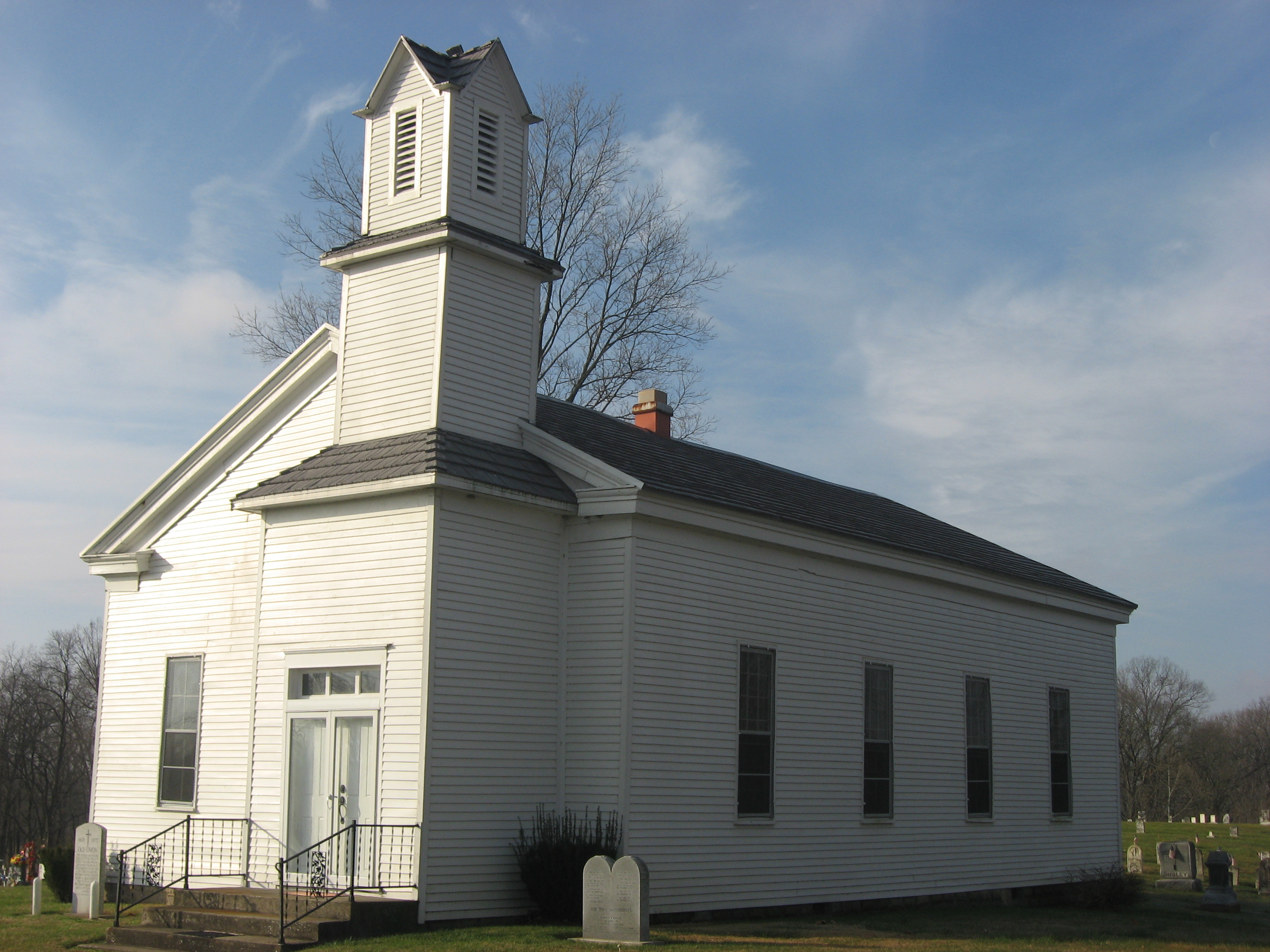

- Location within Indiana Location within the United States
- Nearest city: Alfordsville, Indiana
- Coordinates: 38°32′56″N 86°57′22″W
- Area: 5 acres (2.0 ha)
- Built: 1858
- Built by: Sea, Hilary
- Architectural style: Greek Revival
- NRHP reference No.: 05000605
- Added to NRHP: June 17, 2005

Old Union Church and Cemetery is a historic church and cemetery located in Reeve Township, Daviess County, Indiana. Built in 1858, the church is a one-story Greek Revival-style frame structure with clapboard siding and a gable roof, featuring a projecting entrance tower added around 1900. The nearby cemetery contains about 1,000 graves, with the earliest marked burial dating to 1823, and the property also includes a historic shelter house and privy.

It was listed on the National Register of Historic Places in 2005.
