= Raglesville, Indiana =

- Census-designated place
- Location of Raglesville in Daviess County, Indiana.

- Location in Indiana
- Coordinates: 38°48′08″N 86°57′44″W
- Country: United States
- State: Indiana
- County: Daviess
- Township: Van Buren

Area
  - Total: 0.86 sq mi (2.22 km^{2})
  - Land: 0.85 sq mi (2.21 km^{2})
  - Water: 0.0039 sq mi (0.01 km^{2})
- Elevation: 600 ft (180 m)

Population (2020)
  - Total: 115
  - Density: 134.7/sq mi (51.99/km^{2})
- ZIP code: 47562
- FIPS code: 18-62712
- GNIS feature ID: 2583466

Raglesville is an unincorporated community and census-designated place (CDP) in Van Buren Township, Daviess County, Indiana, United States. As of the 2020 census, Raglesville had a population of 115.

== History ==
Raglesville was laid out in 1837. A post office was established at Raglesville in 1849, and remained in operation until it was discontinued in 1923. John Ragle was the first postmaster.

== Geography ==
Raglesville is located in northeastern Daviess County at 38°48′12″N 86°57′41″W. It is 4 miles (6 km) southeast of Odon and 21 miles (34 km) northeast of Washington, the county seat.

According to the U.S. Census Bureau, the Raglesville CDP has an area of 0.85 square miles (2.2 km^{2}), all of it land.

== Demographics ==
Historical population
Census	Pop.	Note	%±
2020	115		—
U.S. Decennial Census
