= Glendale, Daviess County, Indiana =

Glendale
- Unincorporated community
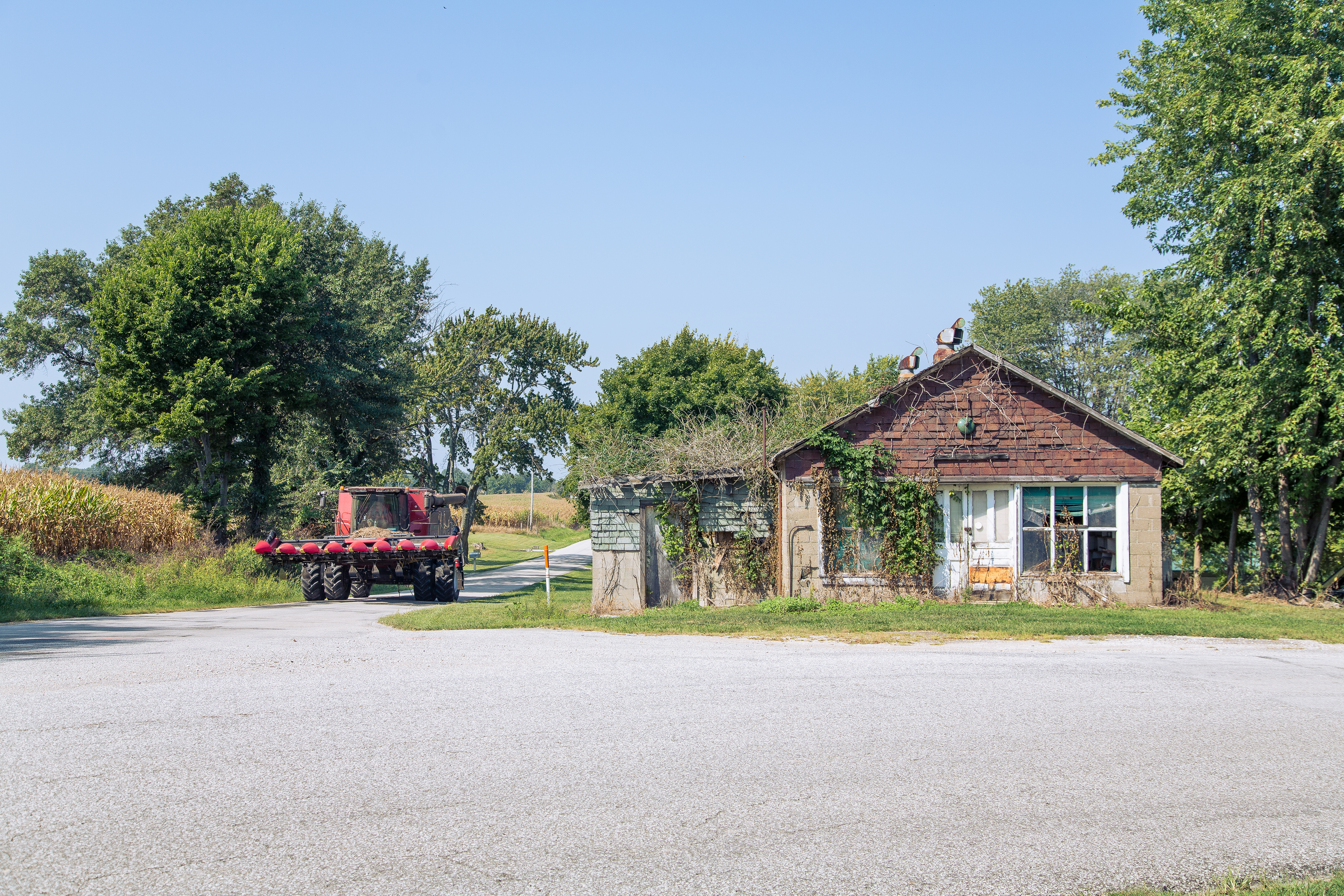

- Location within Indiana Location within the United States
- Coordinates: 38°34′05″N 87°04′38″W
- Country: United States
- State: Indiana
- County: Daviess
- Township: Harrison
- Elevation: 528 ft (161 m)
- ZIP code: 47558
- FIPS code: 18-27864
- GNIS feature ID: 452512

Glendale is an unincorporated community in Harrison Township, Daviess County, Indiana.

== History ==
A post office was established at Glendale (spelled Glen Dale in early years) in 1866, and remained in operation until it was discontinued in 1907. It was named after Glendale, Ohio.
