= Van Buren Township, Daviess County, Indiana =

Van Buren Township
- Township
- Location of Van Buren Township in Daviess County
- Coordinates: 38°46′26″N 86°58′18″W
- Country: United States
- State: Indiana
- County: Daviess

Government
  - Type: Indiana township

Area
  - Total: 30.86 sq mi (79.9 km^{2})
  - Land: 30.22 sq mi (78.3 km^{2})
  - Water: 0.65 sq mi (1.7 km^{2})
- Elevation: 490 ft (150 m)

Population (2020)
  - Total: 2,813
  - Density: 93.08/sq mi (35.94/km^{2})
- FIPS code: 18-78434
- GNIS feature ID: 453944

Van Buren Township is one of ten townships in Daviess County, Indiana. As of the 2020 census, its population was 2,813 (up from 2,552 at 2010) and it contained 727 housing units.

Historical population
Census	Pop.	Note	%±
1890	1,295		—
1900	1,312		1.3%
1910	1,199		−8.6%
1920	1,031		−14.0%
1930	897		−13.0%
1940	961		7.1%
1950	1,038		8.0%
1960	1,117		7.6%
1970	1,125		0.7%
1980	1,333		18.5%
1990	1,589		19.2%
2000	1,960		23.3%
2010	2,552		30.2%
2020	2,813		10.2%
Source: US Decennial Census

== History ==
Van Buren Township was organized in September 1841; the last township to be formed in Daviess County, it was created in response to a petition circulated among residents of parts of Barr and Madison townships, praying to be set off as a separate township. In the first years of settlement, present-day Van Buren Township attracted few pioneers; most individuals in the area were trappers or hunters, and permanent settlement only began in the late 1820s.

== Geography ==
According to the 2010 census, the township has a total area of 30.86 square miles (79.9 km^{2}), of which 30.22 square miles (78.3 km^{2}) (or 97.93%) is land and 0.65 square miles (1.7 km^{2}) (or 2.11%) is water.

=== Unincorporated towns ===
- Raglesville

=== Adjacent townships ===
- Madison Township (north)
- Perry Township, Martin County (east)
- Barr Township (south)
- Bogard Township (west)
- Elmore Township (northwest)

=== Cemeteries ===
The township contains five cemeteries: Evans Memorial Park, Franklin, Kilgore, Liberty and Stoll.
