= General Ketcham =

General Ketcham may refer to:

- Daniel Warren Ketcham (1867–1935), U.S. Army brigadier general
- John H. Ketcham (1832–1906), Union Army brigadier general and brevet major general

== See also ==
- William Scott Ketchum (1813–1871), Union Army brigadier general of Volunteers
