= Bogard Township, Daviess County, Indiana =

Bogard Township
- Township
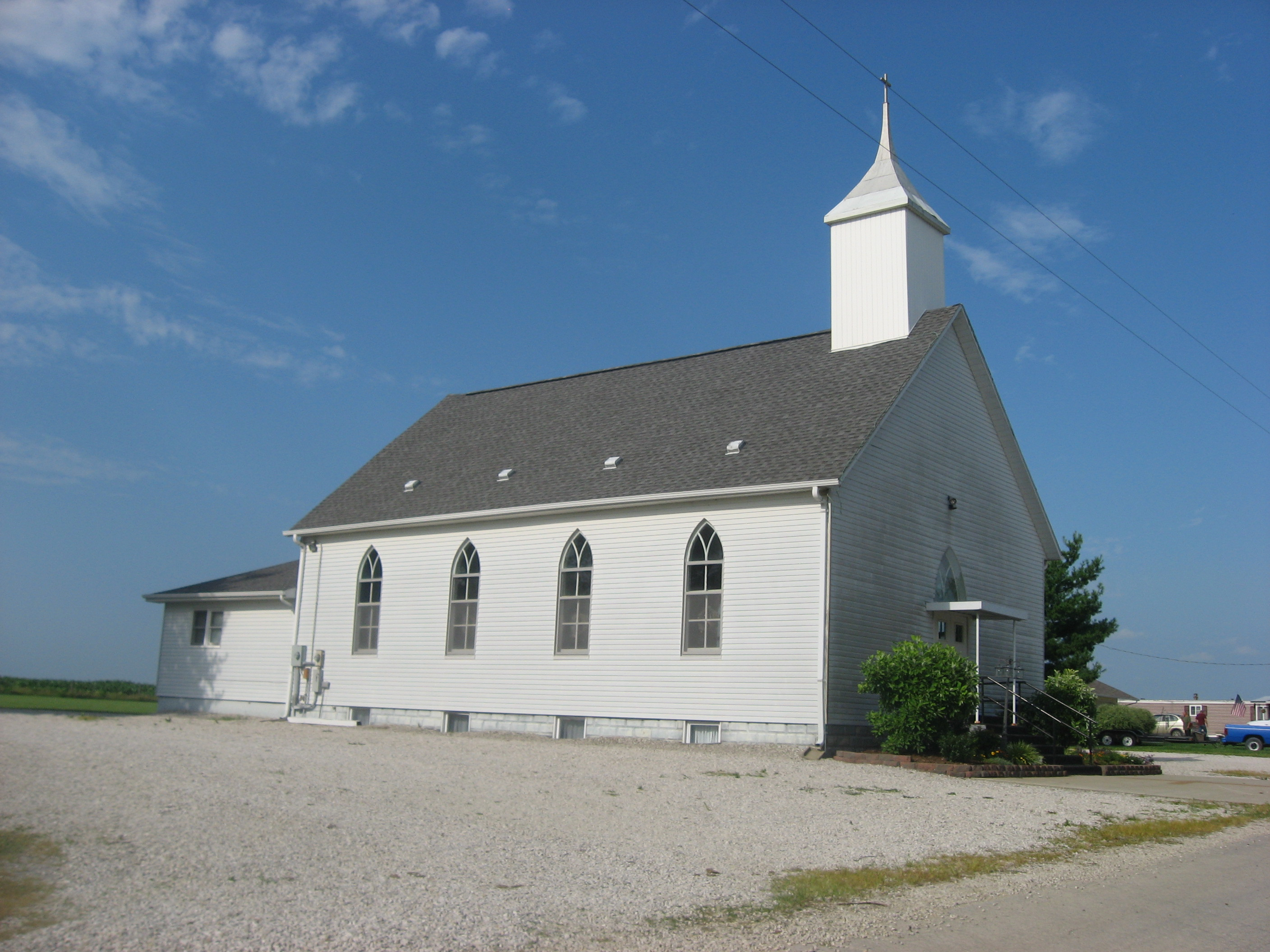
- Methodist church in Cornettsville

- Location of Bogard Township in Daviess County
- Coordinates: 38°46′09″N 87°04′26″W
- Country: United States
- State: Indiana
- County: Daviess

Government
  - Type: Indiana township

Area
  - Total: 36.75 sq mi (95.2 km^{2})
  - Land: 36.44 sq mi (94.4 km^{2})
  - Water: 0.31 sq mi (0.80 km^{2})
- Elevation: 486 ft (148 m)

Population (2020)
  - Total: 1,592
  - Density: 43.69/sq mi (16.87/km^{2})
- FIPS code: 18-06274
- GNIS feature ID: 453121

Bogard Township is one of ten townships in Daviess County, Indiana. As of the 2020 census, its population was 1,592 (up from 1,473 at 2010) and it contained 408 housing units.

Historical population
Census	Pop.	Note	%±
1890	1,693		—
1900	1,802		6.4%
1910	1,574		−12.7%
1920	1,347		−14.4%
1930	1,138		−15.5%
1940	1,096		−3.7%
1950	1,043		−4.8%
1960	944		−9.5%
1970	844		−10.6%
1980	940		11.4%
1990	1,068		13.6%
2000	1,189		11.3%
2010	1,473		23.9%
2020	1,592		8.1%
Source: US Decennial Census

== History ==
Bogard Township was organized on 9 May 1820. Among its earliest settlers was North Carolina native Elias Myers, who arrived in 1816 and purchased 320 acres (130 ha) of land in the following year. Its namesake was a W. Bogard, who was a victim of an attack by Indians.

The McCall Family Farmstead was added to the National Register of Historic Places in 2013.

== Geography ==
According to the 2010 census, the township has a total area of 36.75 square miles (95.2 km^{2}), of which 36.44 square miles (94.4 km^{2}) (or 99.16%) is land and 0.31 square miles (0.80 km^{2}) (or 0.84%) is water.

=== Unincorporated towns ===
- Cornettsville
- Epsom

(This list is based on USGS data and may include former settlements.)

=== Adjacent townships ===
- Elmore Township (north)
- Madison Township (northeast)
- Van Buren Township (east)
- Barr Township (southeast)
- Washington Township (southwest)
- Steele Township (west)

=== Cemeteries ===
The township contains five cemeteries: Concord, Cornettsville, Humphries, Tolberts Chapel and Wells.
