= Madison Township, Daviess County, Indiana =

Madison Township
- Township
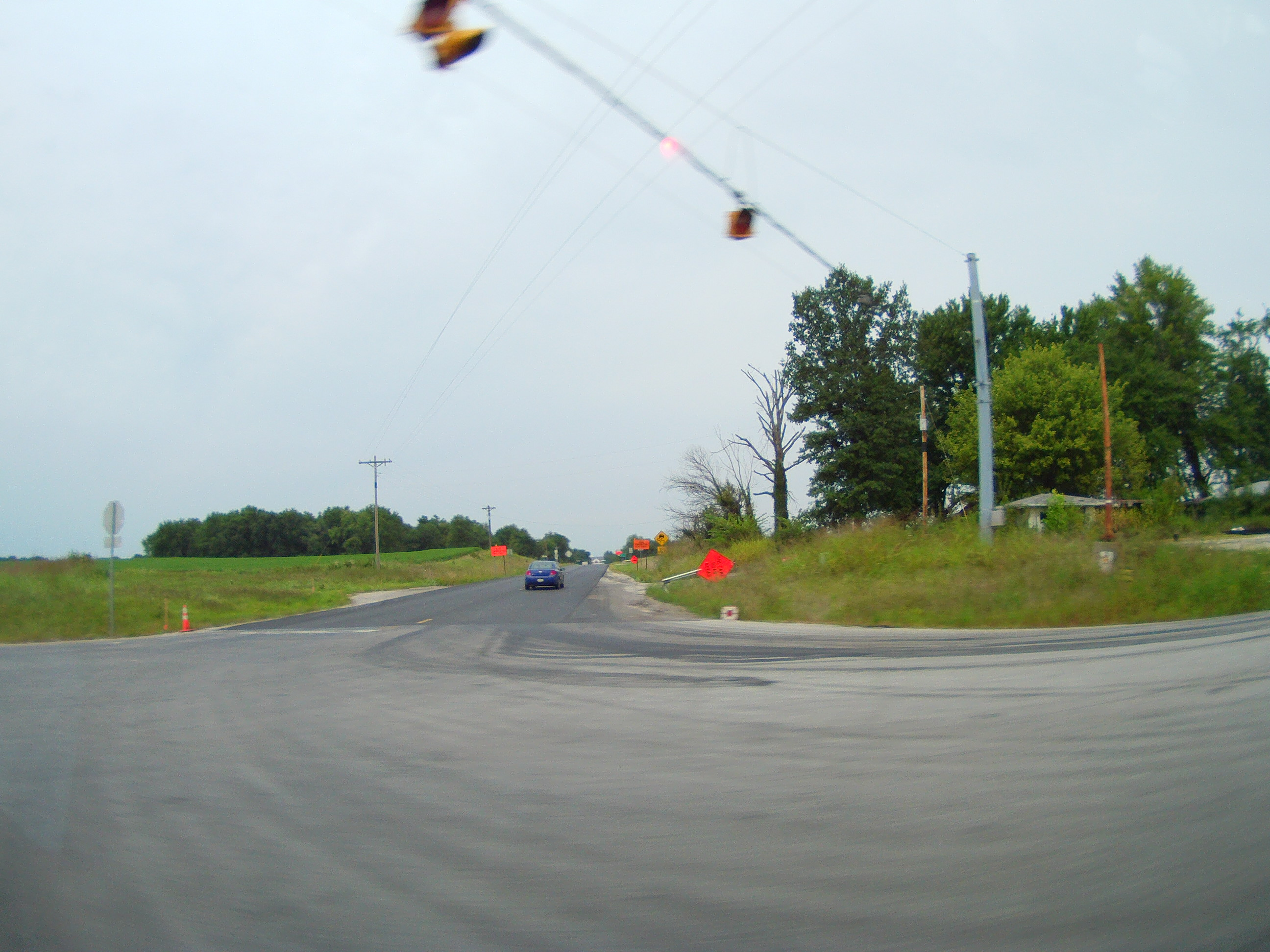
- Looking west on Highway 58 from U.S. 231, in Madison Township

- Location of Madison Township in Daviess County
- Coordinates: 38°51′34″N 86°58′01″W
- Country: United States
- State: Indiana
- County: Daviess

Government
  - Type: Indiana township

Area
  - Total: 36.79 sq mi (95.3 km^{2})
  - Land: 36.64 sq mi (94.9 km^{2})
  - Water: 0.15 sq mi (0.39 km^{2})
- Elevation: 614 ft (187 m)

Population (2020)
  - Total: 3,018
  - Density: 82.37/sq mi (31.80/km^{2})
- FIPS code: 18-45936
- GNIS feature ID: 453590

Madison Township is one of ten townships in Daviess County, Indiana. As of the 2020 census, its population was 3,018 (up from 2,840 at 2010) and it contained 1,276 housing units.

Historical population
Census	Pop.	Note	%±
1890	2,352		—
1900	2,359		0.3%
1910	2,371		0.5%
1920	2,080		−12.3%
1930	1,897		−8.8%
1940	2,003		5.6%
1950	2,282		13.9%
1960	2,461		7.8%
1970	2,570		4.4%
1980	2,788		8.5%
1990	2,609		−6.4%
2000	2,793		7.1%
2010	2,840		1.7%
2020	3,018		6.3%
Source: US Decennial Census

== History ==
Madison Township was organized in 1823 and given the name of "Wallace Township". It had first been settled about two years before; the first pioneer was Baldwin Howard, whose initial residence was about 1 mile (1.6 km) south of the present town of Odon. The original name was used for twelve years; in 1835, residents supported a petition to change the township's name to "Madison", and the county commissioners granted their request.

Among the township's leading nineteenth-century residents was one Ben Perkins, a mulatto; despite the prevailing sentiments of the time, he was well regarded in the community. Living at a time when only whites held the franchise, he regularly voted the Whig ticket without being challenged. In the 1856 spring elections, the Know Nothing movement was popular in Madison Township, and the Democrats nominated Perkins for township clerk; to their surprise, he won, and his actions in office won him the reputation of one of the best clerks the township ever had. To the even greater surprise of local Democratic leaders, Perkins refused to vote the party line in the presidential election of that autumn, instead supporting John C. Frémont, the Republican candidate.

== Geography ==
According to the 2010 census, the township has a total area of 36.79 square miles (95.3 km^{2}), of which 36.64 square miles (94.9 km^{2}) (or 99.59%) is land and 0.15 square miles (0.39 km^{2}) (or 0.41%) is water.

=== Cities and towns ===
- Odon

=== Unincorporated towns ===
- Farlen

=== Adjacent townships ===
- Taylor Township, Greene County (northeast)
- Perry Township, Martin County (southeast)
- Van Buren Township (south)
- Bogard Township (southwest)
- Elmore Township (west)
- Cass Township, Greene County (northwest)

=== Major highways ===
- I-69
- US 231
- SR 58

=== Cemeteries ===
The township contains these cemeteries: Ferguson, Friendship, Pleasant Hill and Walnut Hill.
