= McCall Family Farmstead =

- U.S. National Register of Historic Places
- U.S. Historic district
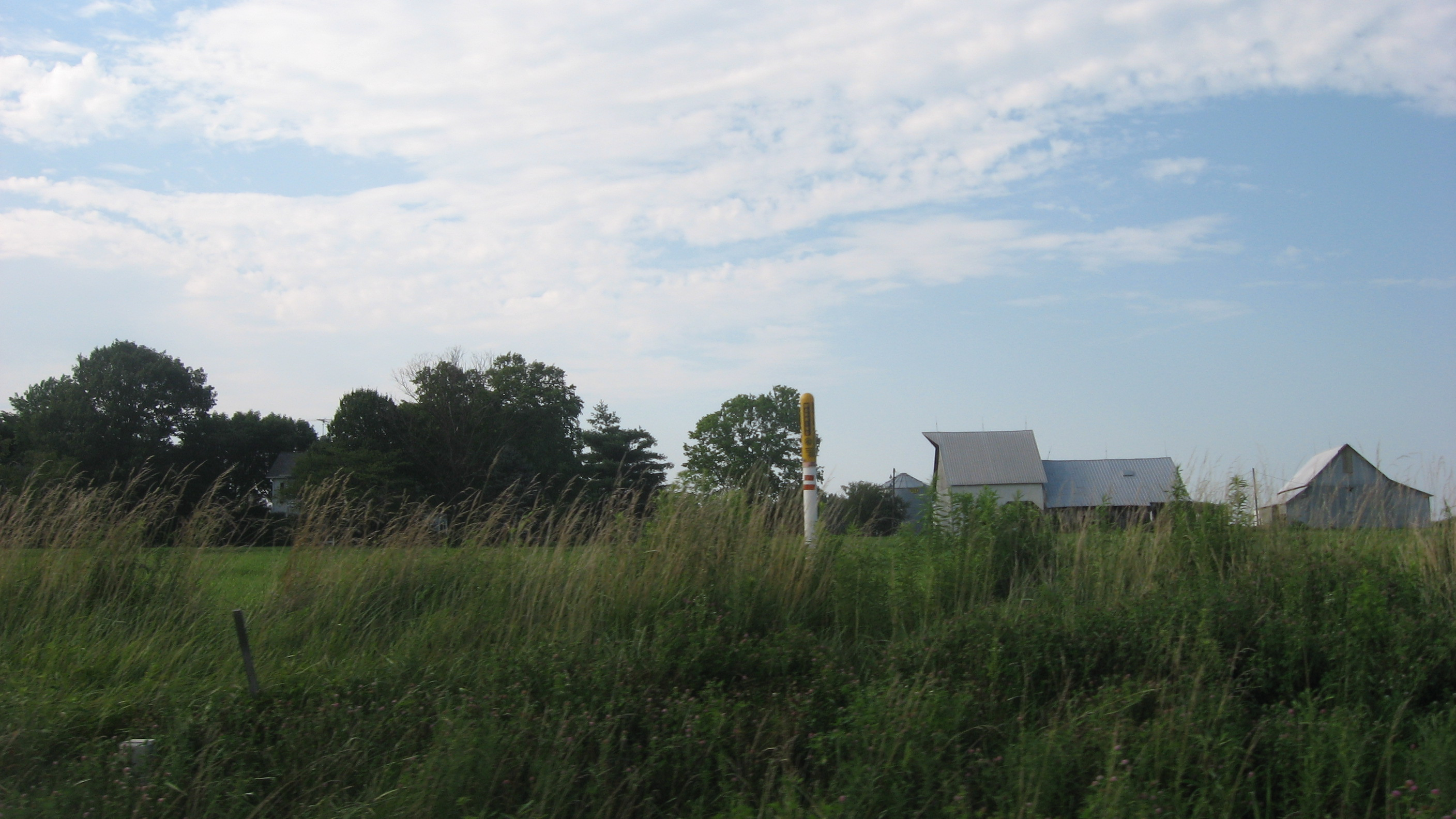
- McCall Family Farmstead, July 2013

- Location within Indiana Location within the United States
- Location: 4914 E800N, southeast of Plainville, Bogard Township, Daviess County, Indiana
- Coordinates: 38°46′22″N 87°04′32″W
- Area: 7.4 acres (3.0 ha)
- Built: 1871-1935
- Built by: McCall, John
- Architectural style: I-house
- NRHP reference No.: 13000721
- Added to NRHP: September 18, 2013

McCall Family Farmstead is a historic home and farm complex and national historic district located in Bogard Township, Daviess County, Indiana. The house was built about 1883, and is a two-story, frame I-house with a rear ell. Other contributing resources are a log barn with timber-frame addition (1871, c. 1895), two timber frame barns (c. 1900, 1920), a pump house (c. 1920), garage (c. 1935), five concrete fence posts (1906–1908), and the agricultural landscape.

It was added to the National Register of Historic Places in 2013.
