= Flag of Daviess County, Indiana =

Flag and seal of Mooresville, Indiana

Daviess County, Indiana

The flag of Daviess County, Indiana, also known as the "Thoroughfare for Freedom" flag, was created by Kathleen J. Cavanaugh for a county wide contest held in 1975. The flag was adopted on January 1, 1976, to coincide with the United States Bicentennial.

== History ==
In 1975, the Daviess County Bicentennial Committee sponsored a contest where residents of the county could submit a flag and a seal design for the county. The contest was known as the "Heritage In Design" contest, and it was held in preparation for the United States Bicentennial. The winner of the contest would receive a $100 bond, and their flag and seal designs would become the official flag and seal of the county. Second place would receive a $50 bond.

The requirements for the contest were the following: Any person or group in the county could submit designs. No more than one submission per each design. Judging would be based upon how well the designs represented the county's history. The designs must be original, of high design quality, are of artistic value, and display good workmanship. The flag must be 16 inches by 24 inches. There should be one flag submitted on paper, and one flag submitted made out of flag materials. The seal should have a diameter of 5 inches.

The submissions were reviewed by a group of judges. The flag and seal designed by Kathleen J. Cavanaugh, an accomplished artist and member of the Daviess County Art League, was chosen as the winner of the contest, and her flag and seal were subsequently adopted after slight revisions to the designs.

== Iconography ==
=== Design ===
The flag consists of a reddish pink railroad in the center that is the height of the flag, shrinking in width as it goes from the bottom of the flag to the top. Placed on the railroad is a large white disc. In the center of the disc is a flame outlined in gold to give double emphasis. The flame is also depicted on the seal. Encompassing the inside edge of the disc is the phrase "DAVIESS COUNTY INDIANA". The dates 1816 and 1817 are inscribed on the bottom of the disc. There are 10 stars forming a circle around the train track, with five stars being on either side of the track. Kathleen J. Cavanaugh titled the flag "Thoroughfare for Freedom".

The railroad on the flag originally had 6 black horizontal stripes, but the county changed the design to contain 9 black stripes. The original design had the date 1976 inscribed on the disc, but the county changed the date to 1817 to match the seal.

=== Symbolism ===
The title "Thoroughfare for Freedom" was given to the flag to suggest the continuing progress of Daviess County from 1816 to 1976, the founding year of the county to the bicentennial anniversary of the United States. The railroad on the flag embodies the title of the flag. The light blue field symbolizes the short-lived Wabash and Erie Canal that was constructed in the county. The light blue field also symbolizes the hopes, ambitions, and disappointments of the entrepreneurs that built the county. The ten stars represent the ten townships of the county. The flame and its gold outline represents the vast coal resources in the county and the influence of religious faith that has sustained and inspired the county since the first settlers. The green garland around the flame symbolizes the importance of agriculture to the county and how no other county can produce crops better than Daviess County.

== Usage ==
The flag is meant to represent all of Daviess County, Indiana. The Daviess County government maintains a copy of the flag.

The original copies of the flag and seal were donated to the Daviess County Museum and are on display in Room 300 of the museum.
