= Elmore Township, Daviess County, Indiana =

Elmore Township
- Township
- Location of Elmore Township in Daviess County
- Coordinates: 38°51′44″N 87°04′17″W
- Country: United States
- State: Indiana
- County: Daviess

Government
  - Type: Indiana township

Area
  - Total: 35.33 sq mi (91.5 km^{2})
  - Land: 34.98 sq mi (90.6 km^{2})
  - Water: 0.35 sq mi (0.91 km^{2})
- Elevation: 490 ft (150 m)

Population (2020)
  - Total: 1,120
  - Density: 312/sq mi (120/km^{2})
- FIPS code: 18-20962
- GNIS feature ID: 453277

Elmore Township is one of ten townships in Daviess County, Indiana, United States. As of the 2020 census, its population was 1,120 and it contained 462 housing units.

Historical population
Census	Pop.	Note	%±
1890	1,968		—
1900	2,706		37.5%
1910	2,268		−16.2%
1920	1,995		−12.0%
1930	1,800		−9.8%
1940	1,721		−4.4%
1950	1,608		−6.6%
1960	1,504		−6.5%
1970	1,515		0.7%
1980	1,376		−9.2%
1990	1,305		−5.2%
2000	1,235		−5.4%
2010	1,113		−9.9%
2020	1,120		0.6%
Source: US Decennial Census

== History ==
Elmore Township was organized on 13 August 1821 from the northern part of Bogard Township. It was named for the Elmore family; although they were not the first settlers (they arrived in 1818, two years after the first settlement), they owned land near the township's voting location. The township's population fluctuated greatly in its early years; many individuals built boats and floated down the White River, while large numbers of people from other states settled in the township. Perhaps the most significant growth occurred in 1825, when at least five Tennessee families and at least one family from Kentucky settled in the township.

== Geography ==
According to the 2020 census, the township has a total area of 35.33 square miles (91.5 km^{2}), of which 34.98 square miles (90.6 km^{2}) (or 99.00%) is land and 0.35 square miles (0.9 km^{2}) (or 1.00%) is water. Indian Pond is in this township.

=== Cities and towns ===
- Elnora

=== Adjacent townships ===
- Cass Township, Greene County (northeast)
- Madison Township (east)
- Van Buren Township (southeast)
- Bogard Township (south)
- Steele Township (southwest)
- Vigo Township, Knox County (west)

=== Major highways ===
- I-69
- SR 57
- SR 58
- SR 358

=== Cemeteries ===
The township contains three cemeteries: Fairview and Ketchem.
