= Indiana State Road 57 =

Highway in Indiana

State Road 57
- SR 57 highlighted in red

Route information
- Maintained by INDOT
- Length: 83.19 mi (133.88 km)
- Existed: October 1, 1926–present

Major junctions
- South end: US 41 at Evansville
- I-69 at Evansville; I-64 near Evansville; US 150 at Washington
- North end: US 231 at Worthington

Location
- Country: United States
- State: Indiana
- Counties: Daviess, Gibson, Greene, Pike, Vanderburgh

Highway system
- Indiana State Highway System; Interstate; US; State; Scenic
← SR 56	→ SR 58

State Road 57 (SR 57) in the U.S. state of Indiana is a north–south, largely two-lane road in the southwestern portion of the state.

== Route description ==
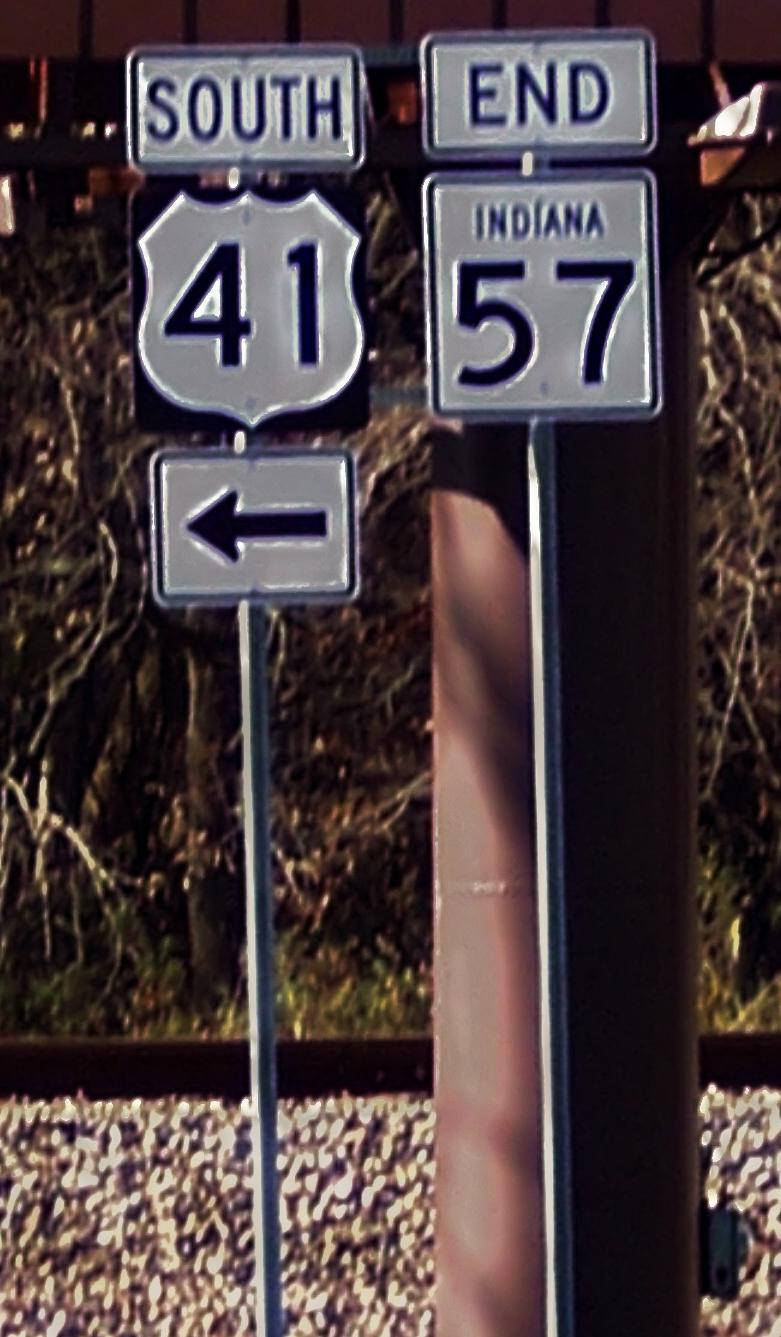
Southern terminus of SR 57 at US 41

SR 57 begins at U.S. Highway 41 in Evansville and provides access to Evansville Regional Airport. It is routed concurrently with Interstate 69 to SR 68 just north of Interstate 64 then is concurrent with SR 68 for roughly 1 mile before resuming its original route. The highway serves a number of small communities and the cities of Oakland City, Petersburg and Washington. The final few miles of SR 57 are concurrent with US 231. SR 57 ends at the south junction of US 231 and SR 67, three miles (4.8 km) southwest of Worthington.

In 2009, a portion of SR 57 was relocated onto the new I-69 route and overlapped with SR 68. The original route has been removed and now exists only as a service road to the Warrick County Industrial Park.

Prior to Interstate 69, SR 57 had been a frequently congested highway with a number of dangerous intersections, such as SR 68 near Haubstadt, SR 168 in Mackey, SR 64 in Oakland City, SR 56 and SR 61 in Petersburg, US 50 in Washington and SR 58 in Elnora. The road had been widened in a number of spots to accommodate the heavy volume.

== Major intersections ==
County	Location	mi	km	Destinations	Notes
Vanderburgh	Evansville	0.00	0.00	US 41 – Evansville	Southern terminus of SR 57
Vanderburgh	Scott Township	8.63	13.89	I-69 south – Evansville	Southern end of I-69 concurrency, Former I-164
Gibson–Warrick county line	Johnson–Greer township line	10.06	16.19	I-64 - Louisville, St. Louis	Former northern terminus of I-164, former southern terminus of I-69
Gibson–Warrick county line	Johnson–Greer township line	11.66	18.76	I-69 north / SR 68 west – Haubstadt, Indianapolis	Northern end of I-69 concurrency; western end of SR 68 concurrency
Warrick	Greer Township			SR 68 east – Dale	Eastern end of SR 68 concurrency
Gibson	Mackey	17.35	27.92	SR 168 west – Fort Branch	Eastern terminus of SR 168
Gibson	Oakland City	22.71	36.55	SR 64 – Princeton, Huntingburg	
Gibson	Oakland City	24.89	40.06	SR 357 south – Oakland City	Northern terminus of SR 357
Pike	Petersburg	35.57	57.24	SR 56 west	Western end of SR 56 concurrency
Pike	Petersburg	36.09	58.08	SR 56 east / SR 61 – Jasper, Boonville, Vincennes	Northern terminus of concurrency of SR 56 after 0.52 mi.
Pike	Petersburg	36.24	58.32	SR 356 east – Jasper	Western terminus of SR 356
Daviess	Washington	47.67	76.72	US 50 / US 150 – Vincennes, Bedford, Paoli	
Daviess	Plainville	60.43	97.25	SR 358 west – Bicknell	Southern end of SR 358 concurrency
Daviess	Elmore Township	63.98	102.97	SR 358 east – Odon	Northern end of SR 358 concurrency
Daviess	Elnora	66.62	107.21	SR 58 west – Sandborn	Western end of SR 58 concurrency
Daviess	Elnora	66.74	107.41	SR 58 east – Odon	Eastern end of SR 58 concurrency
Greene	Fairplay Township	79.90	128.59	US 231 south / SR 54 – Bloomfield, Switz City	Southern end of US 231 concurrency
Greene	Fairplay Township	83.19	133.88	US 231 north / SR 67 – Worthington, Switz City	Northern end of US 231 concurrency; northern terminus of SR 57
1.000 mi = 1.609 km; 1.000 km = 0.621 mi: Concurrency terminus
