= Cumback, Indiana =

Unincorporated community in Indiana, US

Coordinates: 38°33′31″N 87°08′51″W

Cumback is an unincorporated community in Daviess County, Indiana, in the United States.

== History ==
A post office was established at Cumback in 1881, and remained in operation until it was discontinued in 1905. The community was named for William Cumback, a U.S. Representative from Indiana.
