= Farlen, Indiana =

Farlen
- Unincorporated community
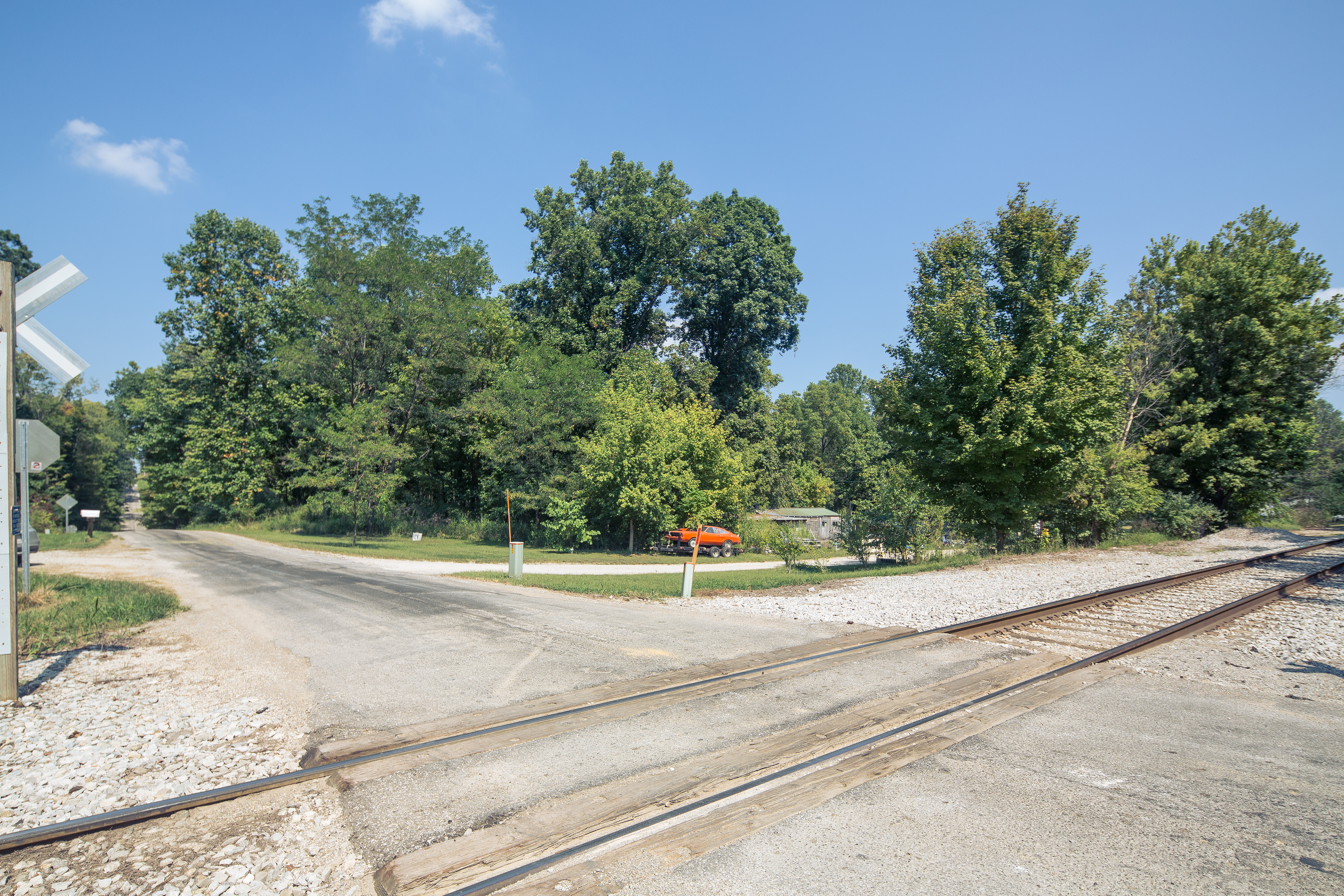

- Location within Indiana Location within the United States
- Coordinates: 38°51′02″N 86°55′22″W
- Country: United States
- State: Indiana
- County: Daviess
- Township: Madison
- Elevation: 620 ft (190 m)
- ZIP code: 47562
- FIPS code: 18-22702
- GNIS feature ID: 434389

Farlen is an unincorporated community in Madison Township, Daviess County, Indiana.

== History ==
A post office was established at Farlen in 1884, and remained in operation until it was discontinued in 1902. The community was named for a McFarlen who kept a store.
