= Corning, Indiana =

Corning
- Unincorporated community
- Location within Indiana Location within the United States
- Coordinates: 38°34′58″N 87°01′03″W
- Country: United States
- State: Indiana
- County: Daviess
- Township: Reeve
- Elevation: 574 ft (175 m)
- ZIP code: 47558
- FIPS code: 18-15166
- GNIS feature ID: 432988

Corning is an unincorporated community in Reeve Township, Daviess County, Indiana.

== History ==
A post office was established at Corning in 1893, and remained in operation until it was discontinued in 1902.
