= James Bradford Foley =

American politician (1807–1886)

James B. Foley

Member of the U.S. House of Representatives from Kentucky's 4th district
- In office March 4, 1857 – March 3, 1859
- Preceded by: William Cumback
- Succeeded by: William S. Holman

Personal details
- Born: James Bradford Foley; October 18, 1807 Dover, Kentucky, U.S.
- Died: December 5, 1886 (aged 79) Greensburg, Indiana, U.S.
- Resting place: South Park Cemetery

James Bradford Foley (October 18, 1807 – December 5, 1886) was an American politician who served one term as a U.S. representative from Indiana from 1857 to 1859.

== Biography ==
Born near Dover, Kentucky, Foley received a limited schooling. He was employed on a flatboat on the Mississippi River in 1823. He moved to Greensburg, Indiana, in 1834.

He engaged in mercantile pursuits from 1834 to 1837, and afterwards in farming. He served as Treasurer of Decatur County from 1841 to 1843. He later served as member of the State constitutional convention in 1850. He was appointed commander of the Fourth Brigade of State militia in 1852.

=== Congress ===
Foley was elected as a Democrat to the Thirty-fifth Congress (March 4, 1857 – March 3, 1859).

=== Later career and death ===
He resumed agricultural pursuits in Decatur County.

He died in Greensburg, Indiana, December 5, 1886. He was interred in South Park Cemetery.

U.S. House of Representatives
| Preceded by William Cumback | Member of the U.S. House of Representatives from Indiana's 4th congressional district 1857-1859 | Succeeded by William S. Holman |
