= William Cumback =

American politician (1829–1905)

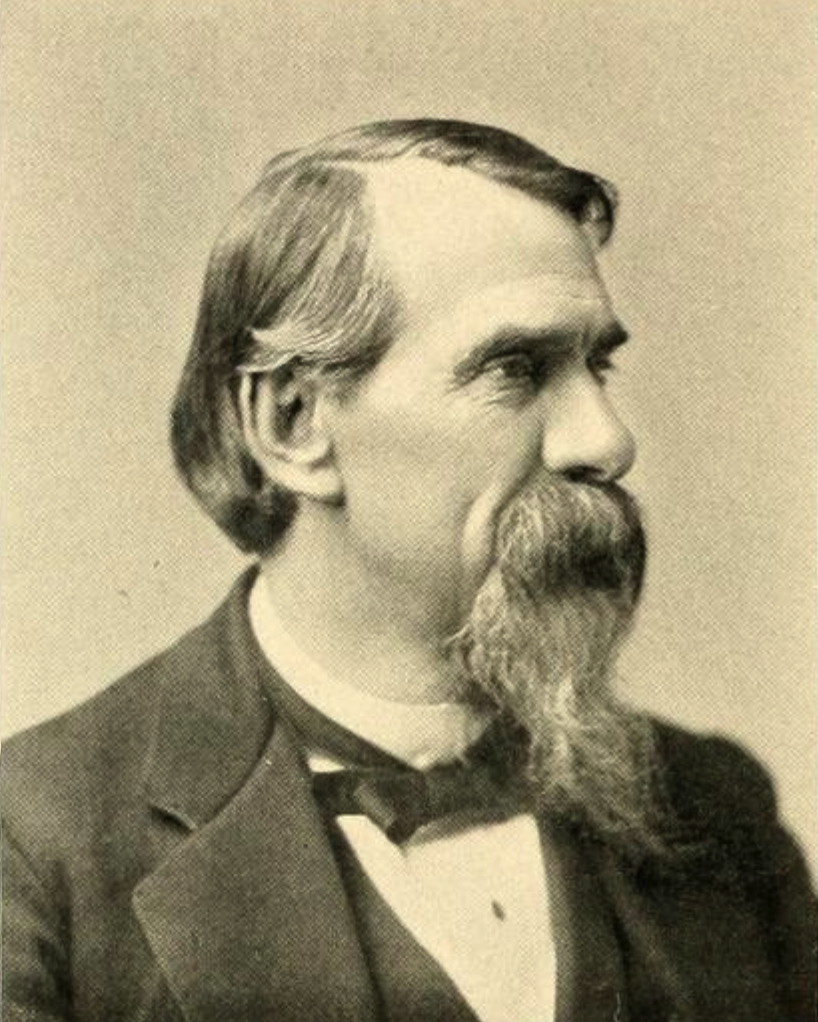

16th Lieutenant Governor of Indiana
- In office January 23, 1867 – January 13, 1873; Acting: January 23, 1867 – January 11, 1869
- Governor: Conrad Baker
- Preceded by: Conrad Baker
- Succeeded by: Leonidas Sexton

Member of the Indiana Senate from Decatur County
- In office January 10, 1867 – January 7, 1869
- Preceded by: D. R. VanBuskirk
- Succeeded by: W. J. Robinson

Member of the U.S. House of Representatives from Indiana's 4th district
- In office March 4, 1855 – March 3, 1857
- Preceded by: James H. Lane
- Succeeded by: James B. Foley

Personal details
- Born: March 24, 1829 Mount Carmel, Indiana, U.S.
- Died: July 31, 1905 (aged 76) Greensburg, Indiana, U.S.
- Party: Republican (after 1860); People's (1854–1860); Whig (before 1854)
- Spouses: Martha Hurlburt (m. 1851) Laura Wachstatter (m. 1901)
- Education: Miami University; Cincinnati Law School
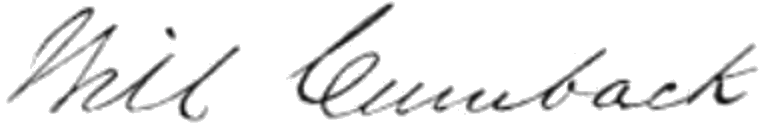
- Signature

Military service
- Allegiance: United States
- Branch/service: Union Army
- Years of service: 1861–1865
- Battles/wars: American Civil War

William Cumback (March 24, 1829 – July 31, 1905) was an American lawyer and Civil War veteran who served one term as a U.S. representative from Indiana from 1855 to 1857.

== Biography ==
Born near Mount Carmel, Indiana, Cumback attended the common schools and was graduated from Miami University, Oxford, Ohio. He taught school two years. He studied law at the Cincinnati Law School. He was admitted to the bar and commenced practice in Greensburg, Indiana, in 1853.

=== Congress ===
Cumback was elected as an Indiana People's Party candidate to the Thirty-fourth Congress (March 4, 1855 – March 3, 1857). He was an unsuccessful candidate for reelection in 1856, and thereafter resumed practicing law.

=== Civil War ===
He was appointed a paymaster in the Army and served throughout the Civil War. He served as member of the State senate in 1866. The 16th Lieutenant Governor of Indiana in 1868.

=== Later career and death ===
He was an unsuccessful candidate for election to the United States Senate in 1869.

President U.S. Grant nominated Cumback as the U.S. Minister to Portugal in 1870 but he declined the appointment. He served as a United States revenue collector from 1871 to 1883. He also served as a trustee of DePauw University in Greencastle, Indiana.

He was an unsuccessful candidate for nomination for governor in 1896.

He died in Greensburg, Indiana, July 31, 1905. He was interred in South Park Cemetery.

=== Legacy ===
William Cumback is the namesake of the community of Cumback, Indiana.

== Notes and references ==
- United States Congress. "William Cumback (id: C000980)". Biographical Directory of the United States Congress.

Political offices
Preceded by Conrad Baker	Lieutenant Governor of Indiana; 1869 – 1873	Succeeded by Leonidas Sexton
U.S. House of Representatives
Preceded by James H. Lane	Member of the U.S. House of Representatives from Indiana's 4th congressional district 1855-1857	Succeeded by James B. Foley
