= Glendale Ridge Archaeological Site =

- Glendale Ridge Archaeological Site (12 Da 86)
- U.S. National Register of Historic Places
- Location within Indiana Location within the United States
- Coordinates: 38°30′57″N 87°02′53″W
- Area: 1 acre (0.40 ha)
- NRHP reference No.: 85001165
- Added to NRHP: May 30, 1985

The Glendale Ridge Archaeological Site (12 Da 86) is an archaeological site located near Hudsonville, Indiana, United States. The site was listed on the National Register of Historic Places on May 30, 1985; however its listing mistakenly refers to the site as the Glendale River Archaeological Site.

== See also ==
- List of archaeological sites on the National Register of Historic Places in Indiana
