= Cornettsville, Indiana =

Cornettsville
- Unincorporated community
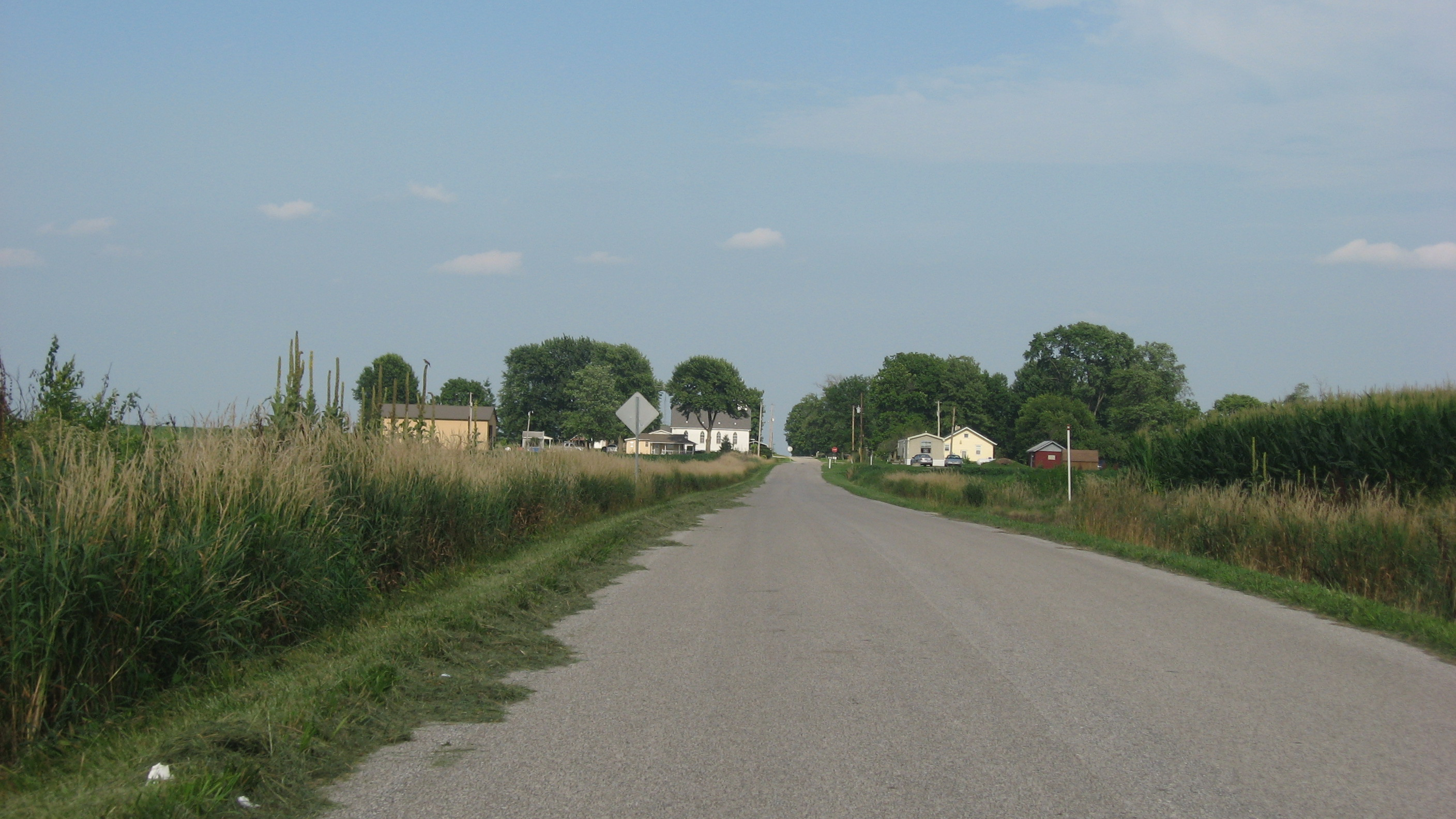
- Approaching Cornettsville from the west

- Location within Indiana Location within the United States
- Coordinates: 38°45′24″N 87°06′36″W
- Country: United States
- State: Indiana
- County: Daviess
- Township: Bogard
- Elevation: 495 ft (151 m)
- ZIP code: 47568
- FIPS code: 18-15148
- GNIS feature ID: 432986

Cornettsville is an unincorporated community in Bogard Township, Daviess County, Indiana, United States.

== History ==
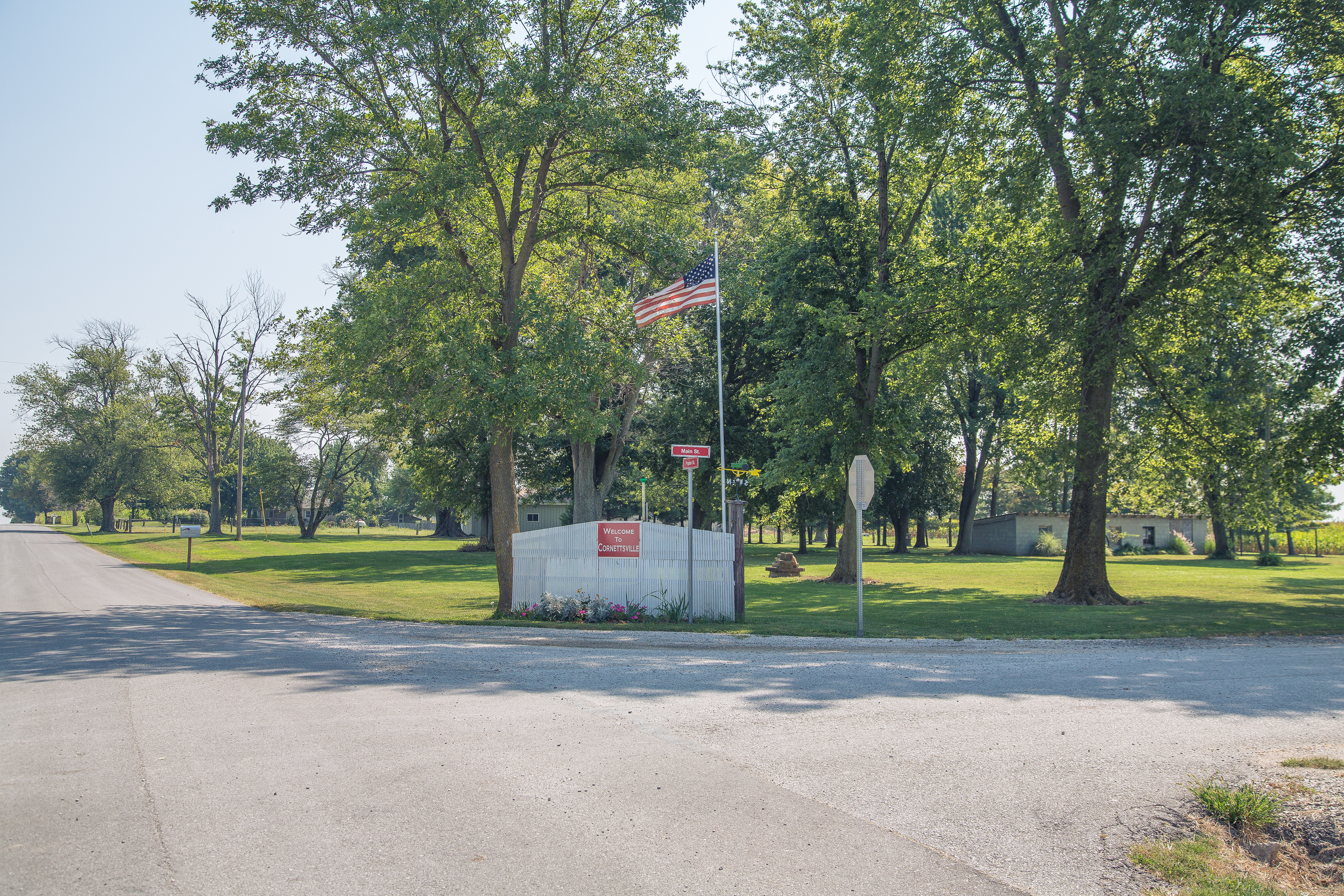
Photo from Small Town Indiana photo survey.

Cornettsville was laid out in 1875. It was named for one of its founders, Samuel Cornett. A post office was established at Cornettsville in 1878, and remained in operation until it was discontinued in 1902.

The town's name was to be decided by which family was the largest in number at that time. The Cornett family and Myers families were the largest. The Cornetts won by one person.
