= Reeve Township, Daviess County, Indiana =

Reeve Township
- Township
- Location of Reeve Township in Daviess County
- Coordinates: 38°33′47″N 86°58′32″W
- Country: United States
- State: Indiana
- County: Daviess

Government
  - Type: Indiana township

Area
  - Total: 44.95 sq mi (116.4 km^{2})
  - Land: 43.88 sq mi (113.6 km^{2})
  - Water: 1.06 sq mi (2.7 km^{2})
- Elevation: 512 ft (156 m)

Population (2020)
  - Total: 624
  - Density: 14.2/sq mi (5.49/km^{2})
- FIPS code: 18-63702
- GNIS feature ID: 453785

Reeve Township is one of ten townships in Daviess County, Indiana. As of the 2020 census, its population was 624 (down from 631 at 2010) and it contained 246 housing units.

Historical population
Census	Pop.	Note	%±
1890	1,674		—
1900	1,784		6.6%
1910	1,576		−11.7%
1920	1,232		−21.8%
1930	1,019		−17.3%
1940	1,155		13.3%
1950	1,024		−11.3%
1960	804		−21.5%
1970	641		−20.3%
1980	723		12.8%
1990	632		−12.6%
2000	696		10.1%
2010	631		−9.3%
2020	624		−1.1%
Source: US Decennial Census

== History ==
Reeve Township was organized on May 12, 1817, at the first meeting of the Daviess County Commissioners. It was named for its earliest resident, South Carolina native Joshua Reeve, who had settled in the township in 1808. As the first settler in the area, Reeve lived in an isolated cabin in the forest; in order to obtain needed supplies, he was forced to travel to Vincennes. Desiring to simplify his travels, Reeve blazed a trail through the woods from his home to Vincennes; in later years, the route became a road, and by the early twentieth century it had become one of the county's leading highways.

== Geography ==
According to the 2010 census, the township has a total area of 44.95 square miles (116.4 km^{2}), of which 43.88 square miles (113.6 km^{2}) (or 97.62%) is land and 1.06 square miles (2.7 km^{2}) (or 2.36%) is water. Big Piney Pond and Little Piney Pond are in this township.

=== Cities and towns ===
- Alfordsville

=== Unincorporated communities ===
- Corning
- Pennyville

=== Adjacent townships ===
- Barr Township (north)
- Perry Township, Martin County (northeast)
- Rutherford Township, Martin County (east)
- Harbison Township, Dubois County (southeast)
- Boone Township, Dubois County (south)
- Harrison Township (west)

=== Cemeteries ===
The township contains three cemeteries: the Alfordsville Christian Cemetery just north of town, Old Union Cemetery on the land originally owned by James Allen and his wife, Mary Hizer Allen, southwest of town, and the Helpenstine Cemetery (also known as the McCord Cemetery) east of town on the County Line Road.
