= Sandy Hook, Indiana =

Unincorporated community in Indiana, U.S.

Coordinates: 38°34′06″N 87°13′04″W

Sandy Hook was an unincorporated community in Veale Township, Daviess County, Indiana, United States.

== History ==
In the mid-1800s Sandy Hook had a general store, a number of homes, a saw mill, and a tavern. The New York Central Railroad also had a station there (Sandy Hook Station).

When Sandy Hook contained a post office it was spelled Sandyhook. It opened in 1899, and closed the next year, in 1900.
