= Epsom, Indiana =

Epsom
- Unincorporated community
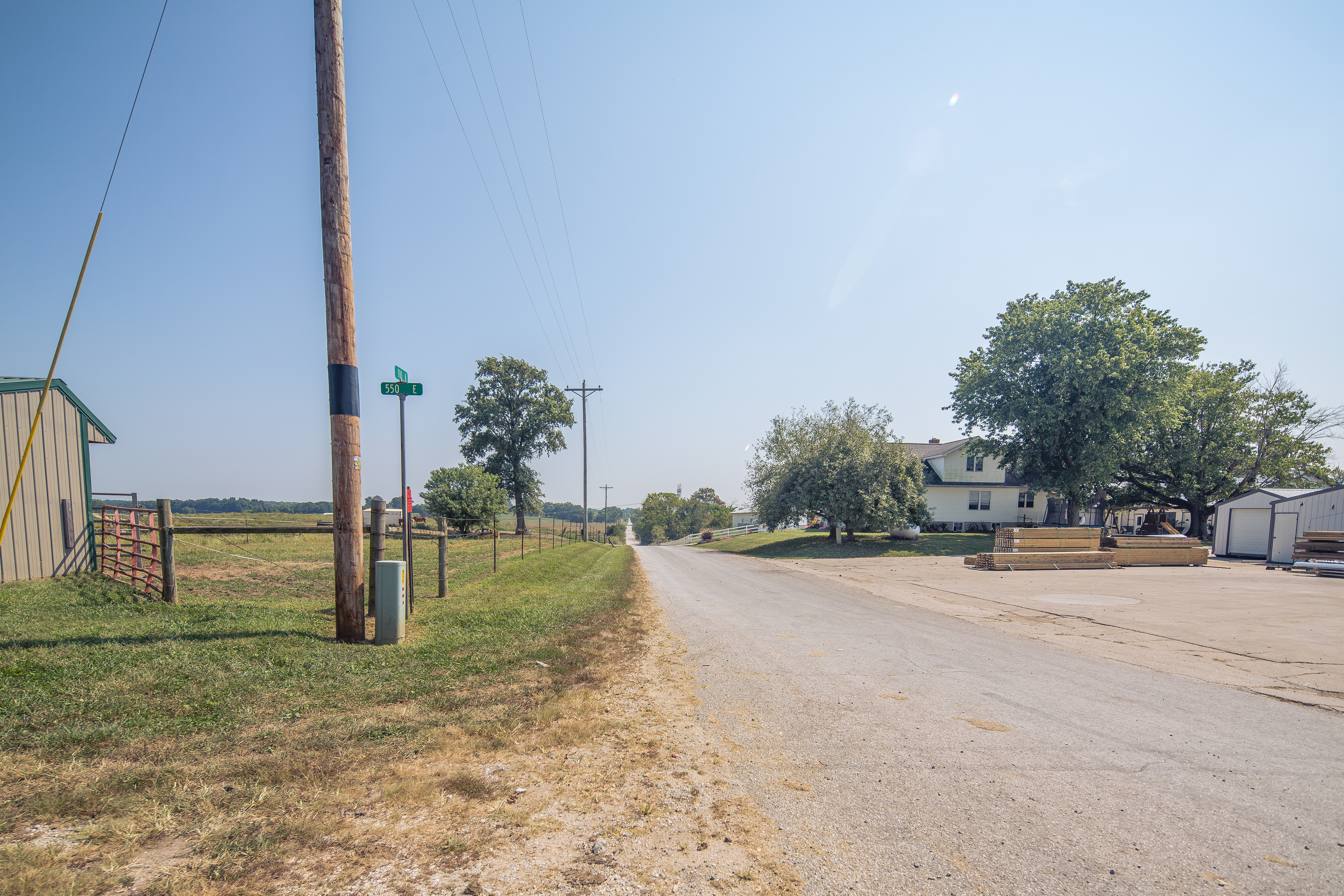

- Location within Indiana Location within the United States
- Coordinates: 38°47′07″N 87°03′47″W
- Country: United States
- State: Indiana
- County: Daviess
- Township: Bogard
- Elevation: 509 ft (155 m)
- Time zone: UTC-5 (Eastern (EST))
  - Summer (DST): UTC-4 (EDT)
- ZIP code: 47568
- Area code: 812
- GNIS feature ID: 434222

Epsom is an unincorporated community in Bogard Township, Daviess County, in the U.S. state of Indiana.

== History ==
The first settlement at Epsom was made about 1815. The community took its name from a nearby well containing water which tasted of epsom salts.

A post office was established at Epsom in 1856, and remained in operation until it was discontinued in 1905.
