= Elnora, Indiana =

- Town
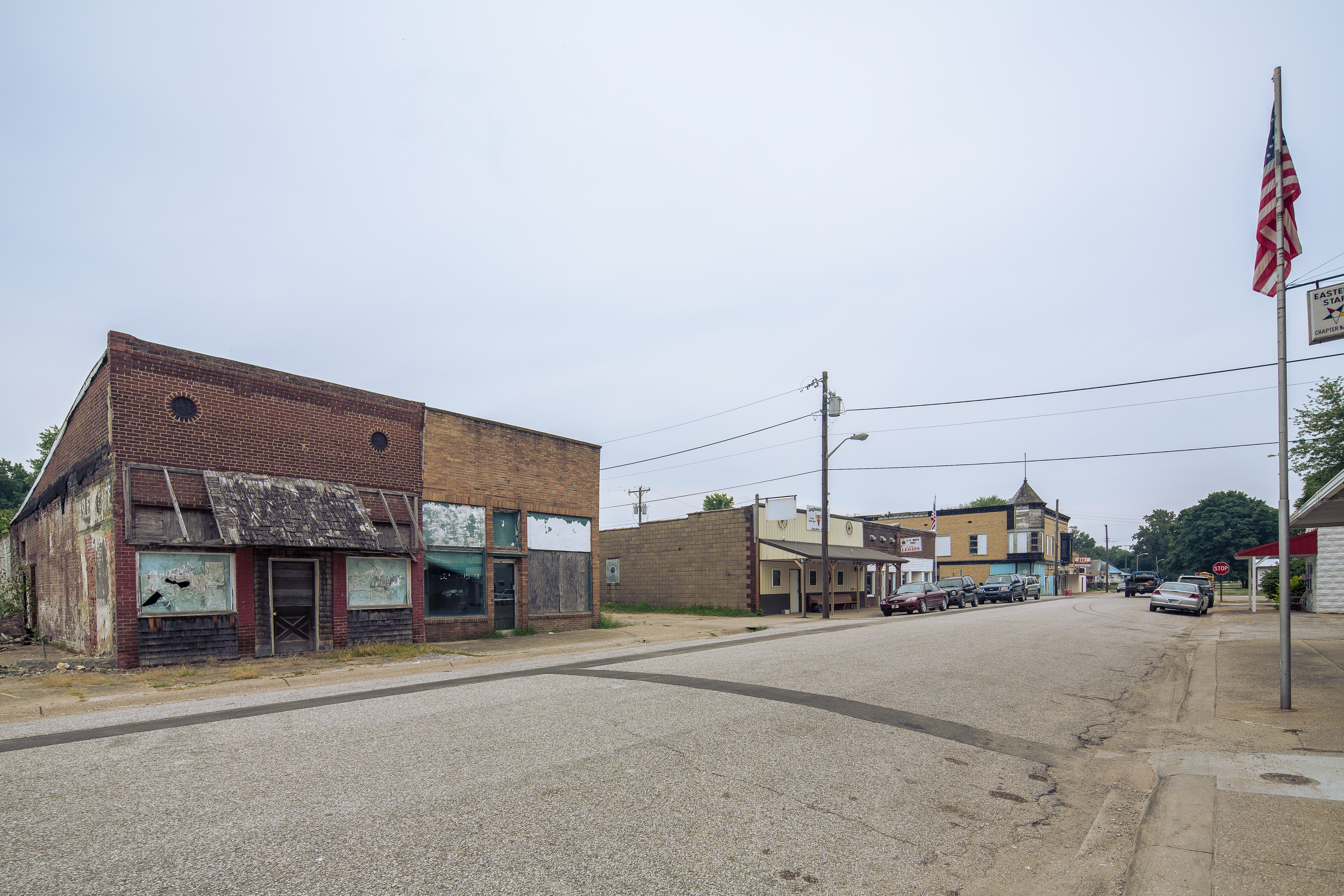

- Location of Elnora in Daviess County, Indiana.
- Coordinates: 38°52′34″N 87°05′05″W
- Country: United States
- State: Indiana
- County: Daviess
- Township: Elmore

Area
  - Total: 0.98 sq mi (2.53 km^{2})
  - Land: 0.98 sq mi (2.53 km^{2})
  - Water: 0 sq mi (0.00 km^{2})
- Elevation: 479 ft (146 m)

Population (2020)
  - Total: 631
  - Density: 646.8/sq mi (249.74/km^{2})
- Time zone: UTC-5 (EST)
  - Summer (DST): UTC-5 (EST)
- ZIP code: 47529
- Area code: 812
- FIPS code: 18-20998
- GNIS feature ID: 2396927

Elnora is a town in Elmore Township, Daviess County, Indiana, United States. As of the 2020 census, Elnora had a population of 631.

== History ==
Elnora was platted in 1885 when the railroad was extended to that point. It was named for Elnora Griffith, wife of an early merchant.

== Geography ==
According to the 2010 census, Elnora has a total area of 0.95 square miles (2.46 km^{2}), all land.

=== Climate ===
Climate data for Elnora, Indiana, 1991–2020 normals, extremes 2009–present
Month	Jan	Feb	Mar	Apr	May	Jun	Jul	Aug	Sep	Oct	Nov	Dec	Year
Record high °F (°C)	67 (19)	77 (25)	84 (29)	86 (30)	95 (35)	105 (41)	105 (41)	99 (37)	98 (37)	93 (34)	82 (28)	70 (21)	105 (41)
Mean daily maximum °F (°C)	39.6 (4.2)	45.0 (7.2)	57.0 (13.9)	68.7 (20.4)	77.9 (25.5)	85.0 (29.4)	87.6 (30.9)	86.6 (30.3)	82.0 (27.8)	70.5 (21.4)	54.9 (12.7)	43.7 (6.5)	66.5 (19.2)
Daily mean °F (°C)	31.3 (−0.4)	35.6 (2.0)	45.8 (7.7)	56.7 (13.7)	66.6 (19.2)	74.0 (23.3)	76.7 (24.8)	75.2 (24.0)	69.2 (20.7)	58.0 (14.4)	45.1 (7.3)	35.7 (2.1)	55.8 (13.2)
Mean daily minimum °F (°C)	23.0 (−5.0)	26.2 (−3.2)	34.6 (1.4)	44.7 (7.1)	55.4 (13.0)	63.1 (17.3)	65.7 (18.7)	63.7 (17.6)	56.3 (13.5)	45.5 (7.5)	35.4 (1.9)	27.8 (−2.3)	45.1 (7.3)
Record low °F (°C)	−10 (−23)	−14 (−26)	−1 (−18)	23 (−5)	31 (−1)	46 (8)	49 (9)	42 (6)	35 (2)	25 (−4)	5 (−15)	−8 (−22)	−14 (−26)
Average precipitation inches (mm)	3.41 (87)	2.80 (71)	3.85 (98)	5.49 (139)	5.65 (144)	5.63 (143)	4.14 (105)	3.42 (87)	3.83 (97)	3.62 (92)	3.90 (99)	3.83 (97)	49.57 (1,259)
Average snowfall inches (cm)	5.3 (13)	5.4 (14)	2.3 (5.8)	0.0 (0.0)	0.0 (0.0)	0.0 (0.0)	0.0 (0.0)	0.0 (0.0)	0.0 (0.0)	0.0 (0.0)	0.6 (1.5)	4.6 (12)	18.2 (46.3)
Average precipitation days (≥ 0.01 in)	9.0	10.0	11.1	11.9	13.2	11.1	9.8	7.5	7.5	10.5	9.8	10.8	122.2
Average snowy days (≥ 0.1 in)	3.4	3.2	1.3	0.0	0.0	0.0	0.0	0.0	0.0	0.0	0.2	1.9	10.0
Source 1: NOAA
Source 2: National Weather Service

== Education ==
=== Post-secondary education ===
- Elnora Bible Institute (EBI), a ministry of Biblical Mennonite Alliance

=== Junior-senior high schools ===
- North Daviess Junior-Senior High School

== Demographics ==
Historical population
Census	Pop.	Note	%±
1900	908		—
1910	961		5.8%
1920	865		−10.0%
1930	856		−1.0%
1940	799		−6.7%
1950	849		6.3%
1960	824		−2.9%
1970	873		5.9%
1980	756		−13.4%
1990	679		−10.2%
2000	721		6.2%
2010	640		−11.2%
2020	631		−1.4%
U.S. Decennial Census

=== 2010 census ===
As of the census of 2010, there were 640 people, 249 households, and 164 families living in the town. The population density was 673.7 inhabitants per square mile (260.1/km^{2}). There were 308 housing units at an average density of 324.2 per square mile (125.2/km^{2}). The racial makeup of the town was 96.9% White, 0.5% African American, 0.3% Native American, 0.6% Asian, 0.3% from other races, and 1.4% from two or more races. Hispanic or Latino of any race were 1.7% of the population.

There were 249 households, of which 32.1% had children under the age of 18 living with them, 43.8% were married couples living together, 16.1% had a female householder with no husband present, 6.0% had a male householder with no wife present, and 34.1% were non-families. 29.3% of all households were made up of individuals, and 16.9% had someone living alone who was 65 years of age or older. The average household size was 2.57 and the average family size was 3.18.

The median age in the town was 39.4 years. 26.9% of residents were under the age of 18; 8.3% were between the ages of 18 and 24; 20.1% were from 25 to 44; 28.2% were from 45 to 64; and 16.4% were 65 years of age or older. The gender makeup of the town was 46.6% male and 53.4% female.

=== 2000 census ===
As of the census of 2000, there were 721 people, 294 households, and 201 families living in the town. The population density was 761.7 inhabitants per square mile (294.1/km^{2}). There were 330 housing units at an average density of 348.6 per square mile (134.6/km^{2}). The racial makeup of the town was 98.47% White, 0.28% Native American, 0.97% from other races, and 0.28% from two or more races. Hispanic or Latino of any race were 0.97% of the population.

There were 294 households, out of which 30.6% had children under the age of 18 living with them, 49.7% were married couples living together, 11.6% had a female householder with no husband present, and 31.6% were non-families. 28.6% of all households were made up of individuals, and 21.1% had someone living alone who was 65 years of age or older. The average household size was 2.45 and the average family size was 2.96.

In the town, the population was spread out, with 25.1% under the age of 18, 7.1% from 18 to 24, 25.7% from 25 to 44, 22.2% from 45 to 64, and 20.0% who were 65 years of age or older. The median age was 40 years. For every 100 females, there were 97.0 males. For every 100 females age 18 and over, there were 92.2 males.

The median income for a household in the town was $27,321, and the median income for a family was $34,750. Males had a median income of $29,028 versus $16,875 for females. The per capita income for the town was $14,337. About 14.4% of families and 17.6% of the population were below the poverty line, including 21.4% of those under age 18 and 14.1% of those age 65 or over.

== Transportation ==
=== Highways ===
- I-69
- SR 57
- SR 58

== Notable people ==
- Bill Yeoman, American football player and coach in the United States.
