= Hudsonville, Indiana =

Hudsonville
- Unincorporated community
- Location within Indiana Location within the United States
- Coordinates: 38°32′20″N 87°04′22″W
- Country: United States
- State: Indiana
- County: Daviess
- Township: Harrison
- Elevation: 495 ft (151 m)
- ZIP code: 47558
- FIPS code: 18-35122
- GNIS feature ID: 436577

Hudsonville is an unincorporated community in Harrison Township, Daviess County, Indiana.

== History ==
Hudsonville was laid out in 1856. It was named in honor of a local family. A post office was established at Hudsonville in 1858, and remained in operation until it was discontinued in 1904.
