= Alfordsville, Indiana =

- Town
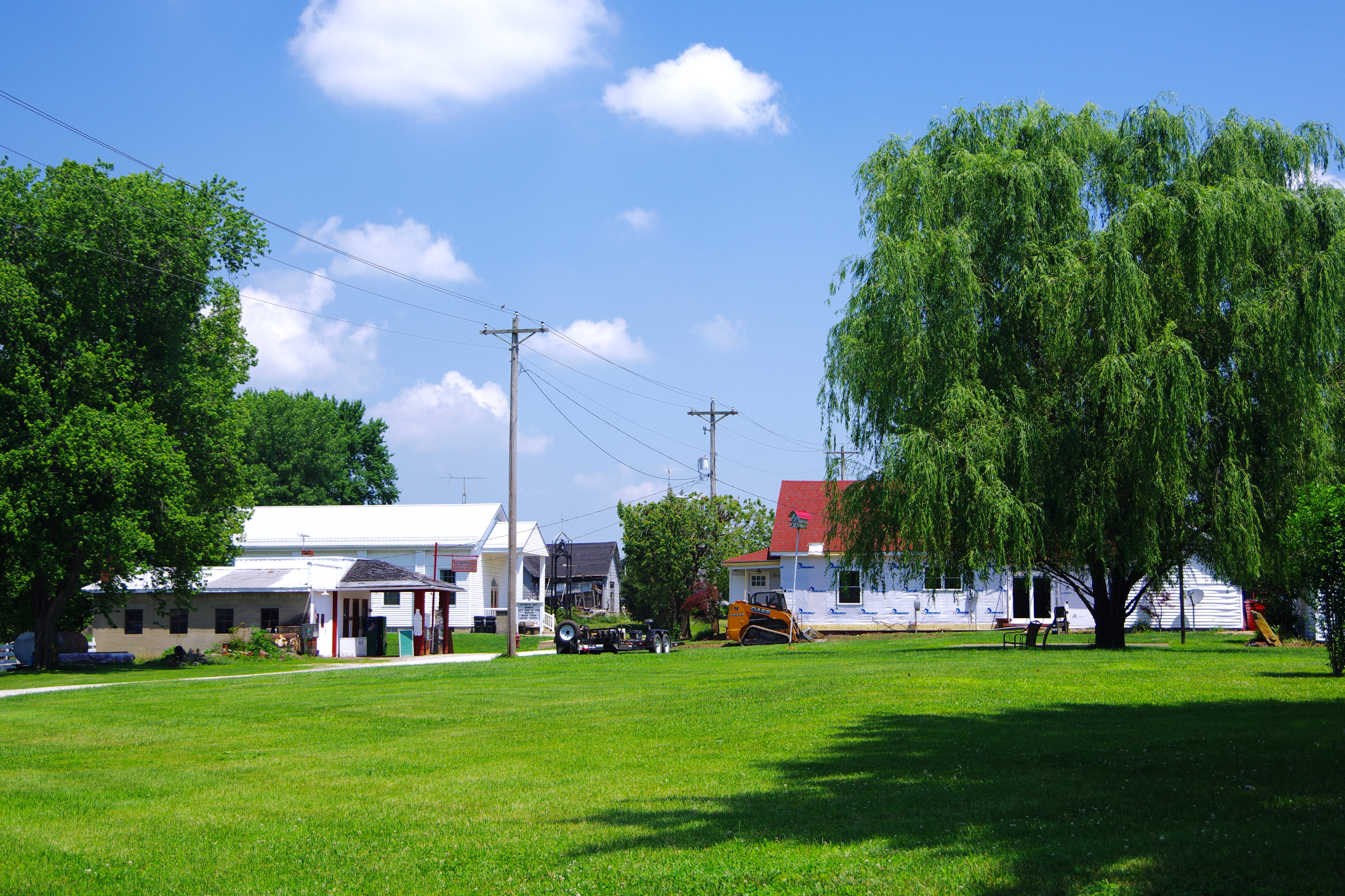
- Alfordsville

- Location of Alfordsville in Daviess County, Indiana
- Coordinates: 38°33′38″N 86°56′54″W
- Country: United States
- State: Indiana
- County: Daviess
- Township: Reeve
- Established: 1845

Area
  - Total: 0.066 sq mi (0.17 km^{2})
  - Land: 0.066 sq mi (0.17 km^{2})
  - Water: 0 sq mi (0.00 km^{2})
- Elevation: 512 ft (156 m)

Population (2020)
  - Total: 65
  - Density: 990.1/sq mi (382.29/km^{2})
- Time zone: UTC-5 (EST)
  - Summer (DST): UTC-5 (EST)
- ZIP code: 47553
- Area code: 812 and 930
- FIPS code: 18-00964
- GNIS ID: 2397424

Alfordsville is a town in Reeve Township, Daviess County, Indiana, United States. The population was 65 at the 2020 census.

== History ==
Alfordsville was laid out in 1845. It was named for James Alford, a pioneer settler.

A post office was established at Alfordsville in 1856, and it was discontinued in 1968.

== Geography ==
Alfordsville is situated in a hilly area in southeastern Daviess County, northwest of Jasper. County Road 650 connects the town with U.S. Route 231 to the east. The Glendale Fish and Wildlife Area, which includes Dogwood Lake, lies to the west of Alfordsville.

According to the 2010 census, Alfordsville has a total area of 0.07 square miles (0.18 km^{2}), all land.

== Demographics ==
Historical population
Census	Pop.	Note	%±
1880	119		—
1890	112		−5.9%
1900	103		−8.0%
1910	94		−8.7%
1920	82		−12.8%
1930	90		9.8%
1940	106		17.8%
1950	101		−4.7%
1960	121		19.8%
1970	105		−13.2%
1980	132		25.7%
1990	74		−43.9%
2000	112		51.4%
2010	101		−9.8%
2020	65		−35.6%
U.S. Decennial Census

=== 2010 census ===
As of the 2010 census, there were 101 people, 37 households, and 29 families residing in the town. The population density was 1,442.9 inhabitants per square mile (557.1/km^{2}). There were 42 housing units at an average density of 600.0 per square mile (231.7/km^{2}). The racial makeup of the town was 99.0% White and 1.0% from two or more races.

There were 37 households, of which 27.0% had children under the age of 18 living with them, 70.3% were married couples living together, 5.4% had a female householder with no husband present, 2.7% had a male householder with no wife present, and 21.6% were non-families. 21.6% of all households were made up of individuals, and 8.1% had someone living alone who was 65 years of age or older. The average household size was 2.73 and the average family size was 3.17.

The median age in the town was 38.8 years. 24.8% of residents were under the age of 18; 8% were between the ages of 18 and 24; 23.7% were from 25 to 44; 29.6% were from 45 to 64; and 13.9% were 65 years of age or older. The gender makeup of the town was 52.5% male and 47.5% female.

=== 2000 census ===
As of the 2000 census, there were 112 people, 44 households, and 30 families residing in the town. The population density was 1,638.4 inhabitants per square mile (632.6/km^{2}). There were 46 housing units at an average density of 672.9 per square mile (259.8/km^{2}). The racial makeup of the town was 100.00% White.

There were 44 households, out of which 34.1% had children under the age of 18 living with them, 59.1% were married couples living together, 9.1% had a female householder with no husband present, and 31.8% were non-families. 31.8% of all households were made up of individuals, and 20.5% had someone living alone who was 65 years of age or older. The average household size was 2.55 and the average family size was 3.20.

In the town, the population was spread out, with 26.8% under the age of 18, 10.7% from 18 to 24, 21.4% from 25 to 44, 27.7% from 45 to 64, and 13.4% who were 65 years of age or older. The median age was 38 years. For every 100 females, there were 96.5 males. For every 100 females age 18 and over, there were 95.2 males.

The median income for a household in the town was $54,375, and the median income for a family was $55,000. Males had a median income of $37,500 versus $19,531 for females. The per capita income for the town was $21,111. There were 9.4% of families and 18.5% of the population living below the poverty line, including 25.6% of under eighteens and 50.0% of those over 64.
