= Plainville, Indiana =

- Town
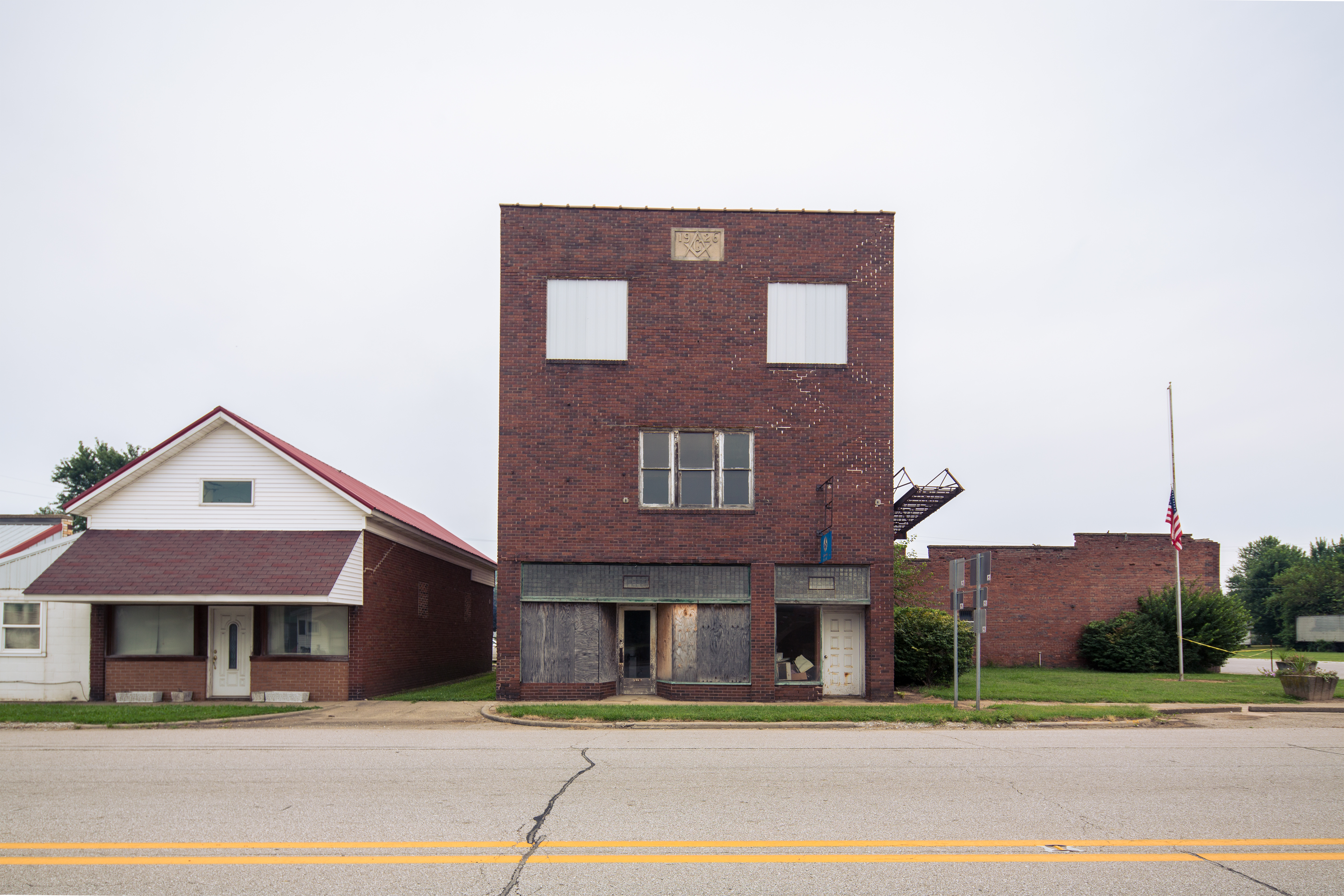

- Location of Plainville in Daviess County, Indiana.
- Coordinates: 38°48′17″N 87°09′05″W
- Country: United States
- State: Indiana
- County: Daviess
- Township: Steele

Area
  - Total: 0.34 sq mi (0.89 km^{2})
  - Land: 0.34 sq mi (0.89 km^{2})
  - Water: 0 sq mi (0.00 km^{2})
- Elevation: 472 ft (144 m)

Population (2020)
  - Total: 499
  - Density: 1,445.7/sq mi (558.19/km^{2})
- Time zone: UTC-6 (Central (CST))
  - Summer (DST): UTC-5 (CDT)
- ZIP code: 47568
- Area code: 812
- FIPS code: 18-60264
- GNIS feature ID: 2396860

Plainville is a town in Steele Township, Daviess County, Indiana, United States. As of the 2020 census, Plainville had a population of 499. The former high school mascot was the Plainville Midgets.

== History ==
Plainville was laid out in 1855. It was likely named from the flatness of the land.

== Geography ==
According to the 2010 census, Plainville has a total area of 0.35 square miles (0.91 km^{2}), all land.

== Demographics ==
Historical population
Census	Pop.	Note	%±
1880	91		—
1890	85		−6.6%
1900	79		−7.1%
1910	84		6.3%
1920	95		13.1%
1930	603		534.7%
1940	619		2.7%
1950	568		−8.2%
1960	545		−4.0%
1970	538		−1.3%
1980	556		3.3%
1990	444		−20.1%
2000	513		15.5%
2010	476		−7.2%
2020	499		4.8%
U.S. Decennial Census

=== 2010 census ===
As of the census of 2010, there were 476 people, 194 households, and 132 families residing in the town. The population density was 1,360.0 inhabitants per square mile (525.1/km^{2}). There were 219 housing units at an average density of 625.7 per square mile (241.6/km^{2}). The racial makeup of the town was 97.7% White, 0.4% African American, 1.1% Asian, and 0.8% from two or more races. Hispanic or Latino of any race were 0.4% of the population.

There were 194 households, of which 34.5% had children under the age of 18 living with them, 49.5% were married couples living together, 12.9% had a female householder with no husband present, 5.7% had a male householder with no wife present, and 32.0% were non-families. 29.4% of all households were made up of individuals, and 10.8% had someone living alone who was 65 years of age or older. The average household size was 2.41 and the average family size was 2.91.

The median age in the town was 39.4 years. 27.3% of residents were under the age of 18; 4.9% were between the ages of 18 and 24; 24% were from 25 to 44; 25.9% were from 45 to 64; and 18.1% were 65 years of age or older. The gender makeup of the town was 50.2% male and 49.8% female.

=== 2000 census ===
As of the census of 2000, there were 513 people, 210 households, and 145 families residing in the town. The population density was 1,555.3 inhabitants per square mile (600.5/km^{2}). There were 231 housing units at an average density of 700.3 per square mile (270.4/km^{2}). The racial makeup of the town was 98.25% White, 0.78% Native American, 0.19% Asian, 0.39% from other races, and 0.39% from two or more races. Hispanic or Latino of any race were 2.34% of the population.

There were 210 households, out of which 32.4% had children under the age of 18 living with them, 58.1% were married couples living together, 8.6% had a female householder with no husband present, and 30.5% were non-families. 28.1% of all households were made up of individuals, and 18.1% had someone living alone who was 65 years of age or older. The average household size was 2.40 and the average family size was 2.92.

In the town, the population was spread out, with 25.3% under the age of 18, 5.7% from 18 to 24, 30.4% from 25 to 44, 18.3% from 45 to 64, and 20.3% who were 65 years of age or older. The median age was 38 years. For every 100 females, there were 94.3 males. For every 100 females age 18 and over, there were 87.7 males.

The median income for a household in the town was $37,969, and the median income for a family was $45,455. Males had a median income of $30,865 versus $18,750 for females. The per capita income for the town was $16,335. About 8.3% of families and 9.8% of the population were below the poverty line, including 12.4% of those under age 18 and 13.3% of those age 65 or over.
