= Daviess County, Indiana =

County in Indiana, United States

- County
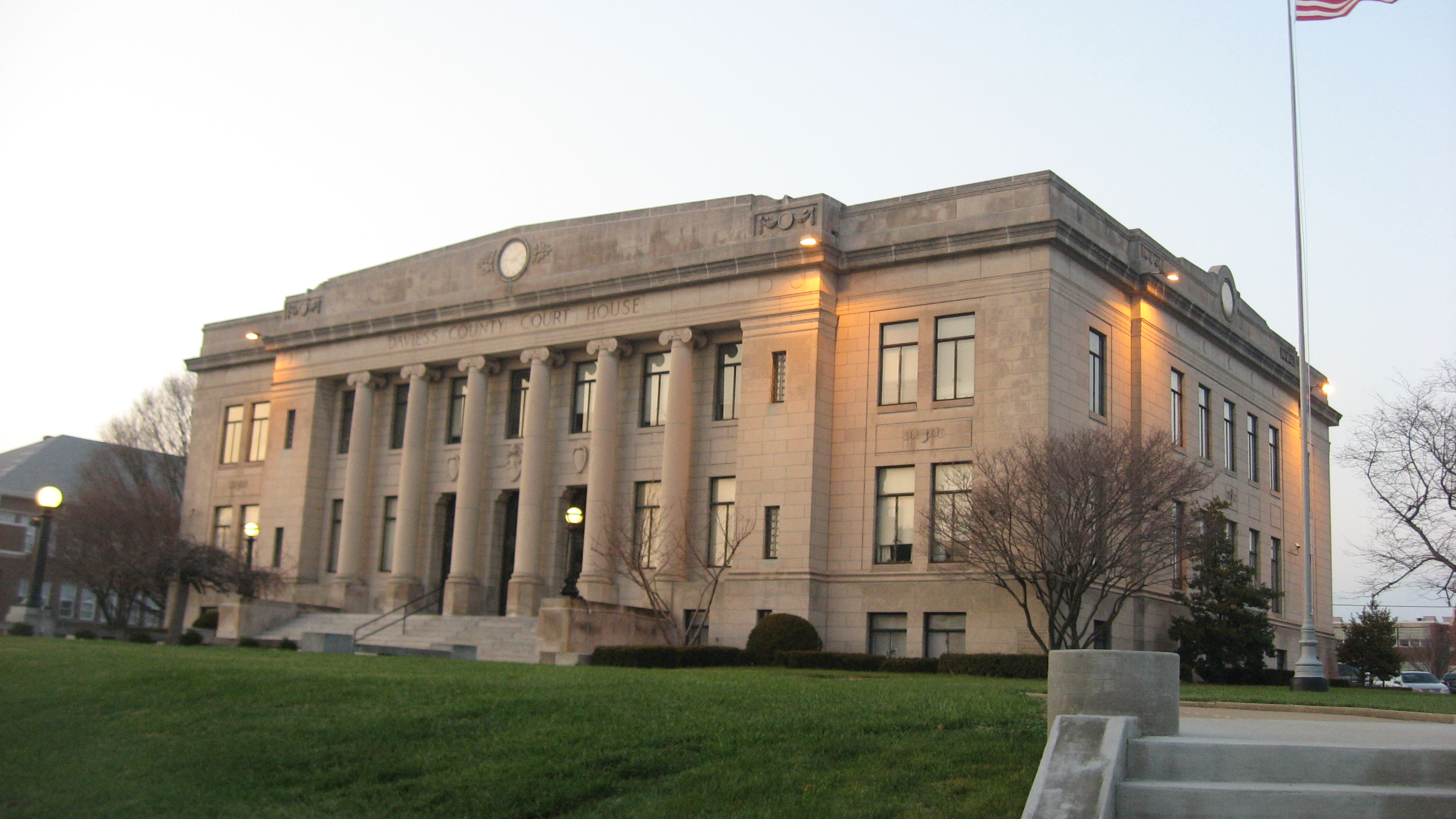
- Daviess County Courthouse

- Flag Seal

- Location within the U.S. state of Indiana
- Coordinates: 38°42′N 87°05′W
- Country: United States
- State: Indiana
- Founded: February 2, 1818
- Named for: Joseph Hamilton Daveiss
- Seat: Washington
- Largest town: Washington

Area
  - Total: 436.87 sq mi (1,131.5 km^{2})
  - Land: 429.49 sq mi (1,112.4 km^{2})
  - Water: 7.39 sq mi (19.1 km^{2}) 1.69%

Population (2020)
  - Total: 33,381
  - Estimate (2025): 34,209 ▲
  - Density: 79.7/sq mi (30.8/km^{2})
- Time zone: UTC−5 (Eastern)
  - Summer (DST): UTC−4 (EDT)
- Congressional district: 8th
- Website: www.daviess.org
- Indiana county number 14: One of two Daviess Counties in the Illinois-Indiana-Kentucky Tri-State Area; 29th oldest county in Indiana

Daviess County /ˈdeɪviːz/ is a county in the U.S. state of Indiana. As of the 2020 United States census, the population was 33,381. The county seat is Washington.

About 15% of the county's population is Amish of Swiss origin, as of 2017.

== History ==
After the American Revolutionary War was settled, the fledgling nation created the Northwest Territory, tentatively divided into two counties. The area that would become the state of Indiana in 1816 was included in the original Knox County. As the area became more settled, Knox was partitioned into smaller counties, the last of which was the present-day Daviess, authorized on February 2, 1818. The boundaries of Daviess were reduced on December 21, 1818, by the formation of Owen County, and on January 17, 1820, by the formation of Martin County. It has retained its present boundary since 1820.

Daviess County was named for Major Joseph Hamilton Daveiss, U.S. district attorney for Kentucky, killed at the Battle of Tippecanoe in 1811. Daviess County shares its namesake with another nearby Daviess County in Kentucky. Both counties are in the Illinois-Indiana-Kentucky Tri-State Area.

The earliest settlements were along the White River, which allowed crops and timber to be transported to distant markets. The northeast part of the county was heavily forested, and timber industry flourished in the first half of the nineteenth century.

== Geography ==
The terrain of Daviess County is hilly, with its area completely devoted to agriculture or urban development. Its highest elevation (740 ft; 230 m ASL) is a rise one mile (1.6 km) north-northeast of Farlen. The county is drained by the White River flowing to the southwest, whose two main forks (East White and West White) come together at the county's southwest corner. The county's west boundary is defined by the West White River's course and its southern boundary is defined by the East White River's course; their confluence defines the county's corner point.

According to the 2010 census, Daviess County has a total area of 436.87 square miles (1,131.5 km^{2}), of which 429.49 square miles (1,112.4 km^{2}), or 98.31%, is land and 7.39 square miles (19.1 km^{2}), or 1.69%, is water.

=== Adjacent counties ===
- Greene County - north
- Martin County - east
- Dubois County - southeast
- Pike County - southwest
- Knox County - west

=== Transit ===
- Washington Transit System

=== Major highways ===
- I-69
- US 50
- US 150
- US 231
- SR 57
- SR 58
- SR 257
- SR 358
- SR 558
- SR 645

== Climate and weather ==
Washington, Indiana

Climate chart (precipitation, max. and min. temperature)
J	F	M	A	M	J	J	A	S	O	N	D
2.8 39 23	2.7 45 27	4.2 56 36	4.2 67 45	5.5 77 55	4.2 85 64	4.9 88 68	3.8 86 66	2.9 80 58	3.1 69 47	4.4 55 38	3.4 43 28
- █ Average max. and min. temperatures in °F
- █ Precipitation totals in inches
- Source: The Weather Channel
Metric conversion
J	F	M	A	M	J	J	A	S	O	N	D
72 4 −5	68 7 −3	105 13 2	107 19 7	140 25 13	106 29 18	125 31 20	98 30 19	74 27 14	79 21 8	111 13 3	86 6 −2
- █ Average max. and min. temperatures in °C
- █ Precipitation totals in mm

In recent years, average temperatures in Washington have ranged from a low of 23 °F (−5 °C) in January to a high of 88 °F (31 °C) in July, although a record low of −19 °F (−28 °C) was recorded in December 1989 and a record high of 113 °F (45 °C) was recorded in July 1930. Average monthly precipitation ranged from 2.69 inches (68 mm) in February to 5.52 inches (140 mm) in May.

== Demographics ==
Historical population
Census	Pop.	Note	%±
1820	3,432		—
1830	4,543		32.4%
1840	6,720		47.9%
1850	10,352		54.0%
1860	13,323		28.7%
1870	16,747		25.7%
1880	21,552		28.7%
1890	26,227		21.7%
1900	29,914		14.1%
1910	27,747		−7.2%
1920	26,856		−3.2%
1930	25,832		−3.8%
1940	26,163		1.3%
1950	26,762		2.3%
1960	26,636		−0.5%
1970	26,602		−0.1%
1980	27,836		4.6%
1990	27,533		−1.1%
2000	29,820		8.3%
2010	31,648		6.1%
2020	33,381		5.5%
2025 (est.)	34,209	▲	2.5%
US Decennial Census:

=== Racial and ethnic composition ===
Daviess County, Indiana – Racial and ethnic composition Note: the US Census treats Hispanic/Latino as an ethnic category. This table excludes Latinos from the racial categories and assigns them to a separate category. Hispanics/Latinos may be of any race.
Race / Ethnicity (NH = Non-Hispanic)	Pop 1980	Pop 1990	Pop 2000	Pop 2010	Pop 2020	% 1980	% 1990	% 2000	% 2010	% 2020
White alone (NH)	27,574	27,302	28,815	29,696	29,708	99.06%	99.16%	96.63%	93.83%	89.00%
Black or African American alone (NH)	123	98	123	165	619	0.44%	0.36%	0.41%	0.52%	1.85%
Native American or Alaska Native alone (NH)	14	26	61	62	38	0.05%	0.09%	0.20%	0.20%	0.11%
Asian alone (NH)	19	20	71	161	132	0.07%	0.07%	0.24%	0.51%	0.40%
Native Hawaiian or Pacific Islander alone (NH)	x	x	2	6	8	x	x	0.01%	0.02%	0.02%
Other race alone (NH)	21	1	2	15	76	0.08%	0.00%	0.01%	0.05%	0.23%
Mixed race or Multiracial (NH)	x	x	126	229	697	x	x	0.42%	0.72%	2.09%
Hispanic or Latino (any race)	85	86	620	1,314	2,103	0.31%	0.31%	2.08%	4.15%	6.30%
Total	27,836	27,533	29,820	31,648	33,381	100.00%	100.00%	100.00%	100.00%	100.00%

=== 2020 census ===
As of the 2020 census, the county had a population of 33,381. The median age was 35.2 years. 29.0% of residents were under the age of 18 and 16.2% of residents were 65 years of age or older. For every 100 females there were 101.6 males, and for every 100 females age 18 and over there were 99.8 males age 18 and over.

The racial makeup of the county was 90.9% White, 1.9% Black or African American, 0.2% American Indian and Alaska Native, 0.4% Asian, <0.1% Native Hawaiian and Pacific Islander, 2.6% from some other race, and 4.0% from two or more races. Hispanic or Latino residents of any race comprised 6.3% of the population.

38.7% of residents lived in urban areas, while 61.3% lived in rural areas.

There were 11,737 households in the county, of which 35.6% had children under the age of 18 living in them. Of all households, 55.4% were married-couple households, 17.3% were households with a male householder and no spouse or partner present, and 21.8% were households with a female householder and no spouse or partner present. About 25.3% of all households were made up of individuals and 12.3% had someone living alone who was 65 years of age or older.

There were 12,738 housing units, of which 7.9% were vacant. Among occupied housing units, 72.6% were owner-occupied and 27.4% were renter-occupied. The homeowner vacancy rate was 1.1% and the rental vacancy rate was 7.5%.

=== 2010 census ===
As of the 2010 United States census, there were 31,648 people, 11,329 households, and 8,116 families in the county. The population density was 73.7 inhabitants per square mile (28.5/km^{2}). There were 12,471 housing units at an average density of 29.0 per square mile (11.2/km^{2}). The racial makeup of the county was 95.0% white, 0.5% black or African American, 0.5% Asian, 0.2% American Indian, 2.6% from other races, and 1.1% from two or more races. Those of Hispanic or Latino origin made up 4.2% of the population. In terms of ancestry, 31.4% were German, 13.1% were Irish, 10.8% were American, and 10.6% were English.

Of the 11,329 households, 36.8% had children under the age of 18 living with them, 57.1% were married couples living together, 10.0% had a female householder with no husband present, 28.4% were non-families, and 24.6% of all households were made up of individuals. The average household size was 2.74 and the average family size was 3.29. The median age was 35.4 years.

The median income for a household in the county was $47,697 and the median income for a family was $53,769. Males had a median income of $36,405 versus $29,652 for females. The per capita income for the county was $20,254. About 7.6% of families and 12.3% of the population were below the poverty line, including 16.7% of those under age 18 and 7.6% of those age 65 or over.

=== Amish community ===
The Amish (Swiss Amish) community in Daviess County, established in 1868, had a total population of 4,855 people (in 29 congregations) in 2017 or 14.6% of the county's population, stretching along the eastern side of the county from Alfordsville, to Cannelburg and Montgomery to Odon.

== Communities ==
=== City ===
- Washington

=== Towns ===
- Alfordsville
- Cannelburg
- Elnora
- Montgomery
- Odon
- Plainville

=== Census-designated place ===
- Raglesville

=== Other unincorporated places ===
- Black Oak
- Cornettsville
- Corning
- Epsom
- Farlen
- Glendale
- Graham
- Hudsonville
- Maysville
- Pennyville
- South Washington

=== Townships ===
- Barr
- Bogard
- Elmore
- Harrison
- Madison
- Reeve
- Steele
- Van Buren
- Veale
- Washington

== Government ==
The county government is a constitutional body, and is granted specific powers by the Constitution of Indiana, and by the Indiana Code. The county council is the legislative branch of the county government and controls spending and revenue collection in the county. Representatives are elected from county districts. The council members serve four-year terms. They are responsible for setting salaries, the annual budget, and special spending. The council also has limited authority to impose local taxes, in the form of an income and property tax that is subject to state level approval, excise taxes, and service taxes.

A board of commissioners constitutes the county's executive body. Commissioners are elected county-wide, in staggered four-year terms. One commissioner serves as president. The board executes the council's legislative acts, collects revenue, and manages the county's government functions.

The county maintains a small claims court that can handle some civil cases. The judge on the court is elected to a term of four years and must be a member of the Indiana Bar Association. The judge is assisted by a constable who is also elected to a four-year term. In some cases, court decisions can be appealed to the state level circuit court.

The county has other elected offices, including sheriff, coroner, auditor, treasurer, recorder, surveyor, and circuit court clerk. Each of these elected officers serves a term of four years and oversees a different part of county government. Members elected to county government positions are required to declare party affiliations and to be residents of the county.

Each township has a trustee who administers rural fire protection and ambulance service, provides poor relief, manages cemetery care, and performs farm assessment, among other duties. The trustee is assisted in these duties by a three-member township board. The trustees and board members are elected to four-year terms.

Daviess County is part of Indiana's 8th congressional district; Indiana Senate districts 39 and 48; and Indiana House of Representatives districts 45, 63 and 64.

=== Political culture ===
United States presidential election results for Daviess County, Indiana
Year	Republican		Democratic		Third party(ies)	
Year	No.	%	No.	%	No.	%
1888	2,691	49.60%	2,689	49.57%	45	0.83%
1892	2,610	42.99%	2,498	41.15%	963	15.86%
1896	3,120	45.00%	3,785	54.59%	29	0.42%
1900	3,298	46.93%	3,424	48.73%	305	4.34%
1904	3,682	52.97%	2,802	40.31%	467	6.72%
1908	3,424	48.38%	3,253	45.97%	400	5.65%
1912	2,005	31.62%	2,759	43.51%	1,577	24.87%
1916	3,191	47.56%	3,143	46.84%	376	5.60%
1920	6,748	53.42%	5,587	44.23%	298	2.36%
1924	6,427	51.42%	5,558	44.46%	515	4.12%
1928	7,116	56.73%	5,324	42.45%	103	0.82%
1932	5,838	45.29%	6,772	52.54%	279	2.16%
1936	6,459	47.95%	6,848	50.84%	163	1.21%
1940	7,615	54.10%	6,401	45.48%	59	0.42%
1944	7,458	57.14%	5,523	42.32%	71	0.54%
1948	7,030	53.89%	5,867	44.98%	147	1.13%
1952	8,328	60.89%	5,247	38.37%	101	0.74%
1956	8,608	62.80%	5,057	36.89%	42	0.31%
1960	8,285	60.20%	5,433	39.48%	45	0.33%
1964	6,319	49.00%	6,528	50.62%	48	0.37%
1968	7,036	56.77%	4,071	32.85%	1,286	10.38%
1972	8,490	70.33%	3,538	29.31%	43	0.36%
1976	6,829	57.69%	4,952	41.83%	57	0.48%
1980	7,022	60.89%	4,057	35.18%	453	3.93%
1984	7,721	68.26%	3,545	31.34%	45	0.40%
1988	6,768	65.75%	3,483	33.84%	43	0.42%
1992	5,591	53.15%	3,201	30.43%	1,728	16.43%
1996	5,531	56.35%	3,230	32.91%	1,054	10.74%
2000	6,872	70.40%	2,697	27.63%	192	1.97%
2004	7,936	74.87%	2,573	24.28%	90	0.85%
2008	7,098	67.05%	3,370	31.83%	118	1.11%
2012	7,638	74.42%	2,437	23.74%	189	1.84%
2016	8,545	78.98%	1,800	16.64%	474	4.38%
2020	9,576	79.99%	2,169	18.12%	226	1.89%
2024	9,322	81.33%	1,963	17.13%	177	1.54%

Daviess County is a Republican stronghold in presidential elections and is consistently one of the most Republican counties in Indiana, giving John McCain 67% of the vote in 2008 and Mitt Romney nearly 75% of the vote in 2012. Donald Trump won nearly 80% of the vote in 2020.

== See also ==
- National Register of Historic Places listings in Daviess County, Indiana
