= Odon, Indiana =

- Town
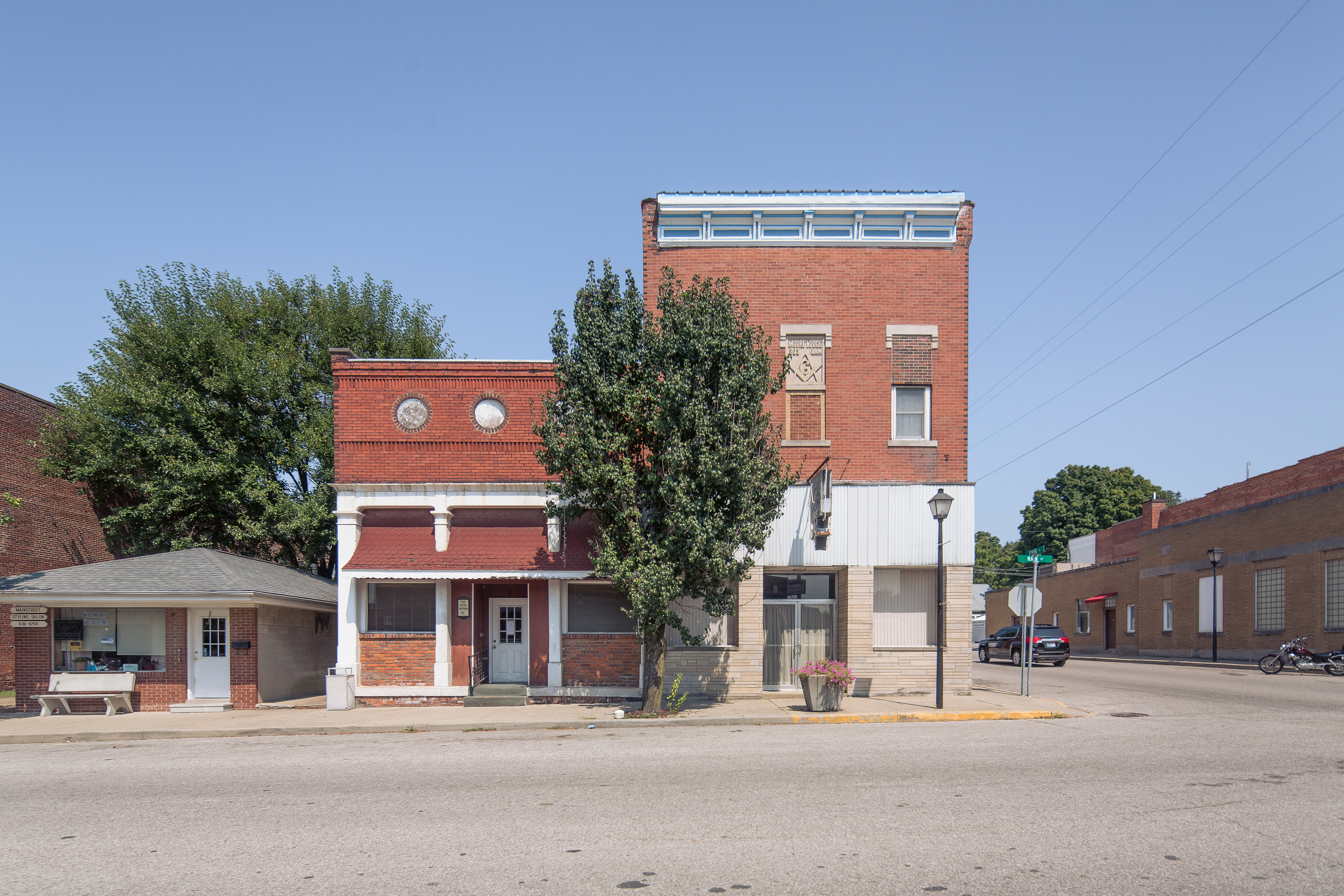

- Location of Odon in Daviess County, Indiana.
- Coordinates: 38°50′32″N 86°59′22″W
- Country: United States
- State: Indiana
- County: Daviess
- Township: Madison
- Platted: 1846
- Incorporated: 1885
- Founded by: John Hastings

Area
  - Total: 0.94 sq mi (2.43 km^{2})
  - Land: 0.93 sq mi (2.41 km^{2})
  - Water: 0.0077 sq mi (0.02 km^{2})
- Elevation: 541 ft (165 m)

Population (2020)
  - Total: 1,397
  - Density: 1,504.4/sq mi (580.84/km^{2})
- Time zone: UTC-5 (EST)
  - Summer (DST): UTC-5 (EST)
- ZIP code: 47562
- Area code: 812
- FIPS code: 18-56052
- GNIS feature ID: 2396828
- Website: townofodon.com

Odon (/ˈoʊdən/ OH-dən) is a town in Madison Township, Daviess County, Indiana, United States. The population was 1,397 at the 2020 census.

== History ==
Odon was originally called Clarksburg, and under the latter name was laid out in 1846 by John Hastings. In 1880 the name was changed to Odon. Odon was incorporated in 1885.

== Geography ==
According to the 2020 census, Odon has a total area of 0.938 square miles (2.43 km^{2}), of which 0.929 square miles (2.41 km^{2}) (or 99.04%) is land and 0.009 square miles (0.02 km^{2}) (or 0.96%) is water.

== Demographics ==
Historical population
Census	Pop.	Note	%±
1890	764		—
1900	923		20.8%
1910	1,064		15.3%
1920	985		−7.4%
1930	981		−0.4%
1940	958		−2.3%
1950	1,177		22.9%
1960	1,192		1.3%
1970	1,433		20.2%
1980	1,463		2.1%
1990	1,475		0.8%
2000	1,376		−6.7%
2010	1,354		−1.6%
2020	1,397		3.2%
U.S. Decennial Census

=== 2020 census ===
As of the 2020 census, Odon had a population of 1,397. The median age was 44.2 years. 21.2% of residents were under the age of 18 and 25.4% of residents were 65 years of age or older. For every 100 females there were 88.3 males, and for every 100 females age 18 and over there were 85.0 males age 18 and over.

0.0% of residents lived in urban areas, while 100.0% lived in rural areas.

There were 609 households in Odon, of which 25.9% had children under the age of 18 living in them. Of all households, 42.9% were married-couple households, 19.4% were households with a male householder and no spouse or partner present, and 32.3% were households with a female householder and no spouse or partner present. About 38.6% of all households were made up of individuals and 21.5% had someone living alone who was 65 years of age or older.

There were 666 housing units, of which 8.6% were vacant. The homeowner vacancy rate was 0.0% and the rental vacancy rate was 10.1%.

Racial composition as of the 2020 census
Race	Number	Percent
White	1,316	94.2%
Black or African American	5	0.4%
American Indian and Alaska Native	9	0.6%
Asian	9	0.6%
Native Hawaiian and Other Pacific Islander	0	0.0%
Some other race	9	0.6%
Two or more races	49	3.5%
Hispanic or Latino (of any race)	27	1.9%

=== 2010 census ===
As of the census of 2010, there were 1,354 people, 603 households, and 347 families living in the town. The population density was 1,425.3 inhabitants per square mile (550.3/km^{2}). There were 686 housing units at an average density of 722.1 per square mile (278.8/km^{2}). The racial makeup of the town was 98.3% White, 0.6% Native American, 0.3% Asian, and 0.8% from two or more races. Hispanic or Latino of any race were 0.3% of the population.

There were 603 households, of which 27.7% had children under the age of 18 living with them, 41.3% were married couples living together, 13.3% had a female householder with no husband present, 3.0% had a male householder with no wife present, and 42.5% were non-families. 39.8% of all households were made up of individuals, and 23.1% had someone living alone who was 65 years of age or older. The average household size was 2.18 and the average family size was 2.89.

The median age in the town was 45.1 years. 23.8% of residents were under the age of 18; 5.5% were between the ages of 18 and 24; 20.4% were from 25 to 44; 26.2% were from 45 to 64; and 24% were 65 years of age or older. The gender makeup of the town was 45.6% male and 54.4% female.

=== 2000 census ===
As of the census of 2000, there were 1,376 people, 601 households, and 378 families living in the town. The population density was 1,458.4 inhabitants per square mile (563.1/km^{2}). There were 652 housing units at an average density of 691.0 per square mile (266.8/km^{2}). The racial makeup of the town was 98.62% White, 0.15% African American, 0.44% Native American, 0.36% Asian, 0.15% from other races, and 0.29% from two or more races. Hispanic or Latino of any race were 0.87% of the population.

There were 601 households, out of which 25.5% had children under the age of 18 living with them, 50.9% were married couples living together, 9.3% had a female householder with no husband present, and 37.1% were non-families. 35.3% of all households were made up of individuals, and 19.3% had someone living alone who was 65 years of age or older. The average household size was 2.21 and the average family size was 2.87.

In the town, the population was spread out, with 21.9% under the age of 18, 6.8% from 18 to 24, 24.3% from 25 to 44, 23.3% from 45 to 64, and 23.7% who were 65 years of age or older. The median age was 43 years. For every 100 females, there were 89.5 males. For every 100 females age 18 and over, there were 80.4 males.

The median income for a household in the town was $34,667, and the median income for a family was $42,813. Males had a median income of $31,438 versus $20,833 for females. The per capita income for the town was $20,020. About 8.7% of families and 11.1% of the population were below the poverty line, including 18.1% of those under age 18 and 9.0% of those age 65 or over.

== Education ==
Odon is served by the North Daviess Junior-Senior High School.

The town has a free lending library, the Odon Winkelpleck Public Library.

== Notable people ==
- Joe Dawson (racing driver) - winner of second Indianapolis 500
- Frank Douglas Garrett (born 1944) - university dean, speaker, author and basketball player
- Herb Henderson - football player, coach, and official.
- John Poindexter - National Security Advisor in 1985 and director of DARPA for much of 2003.
