= Bishop Simon Bruté College Seminary =

Seminary in Indianapolis, Indiana, US

Coordinates: 39.8006°N 86.2046°W

- Former name: Bishop Simon Bruté House of Formation
- Type: Catholic seminary (all men)
- Established: September 8, 2004
- Affiliations: Catholic Church; Marian University
- Academic staff: 4 priests in residence, 1 available every 2 weeks.
- Administrative staff: 2 (1 Office Manager & 1 Psychologist)
- Location: Indianapolis, Indiana, Indiana, United States
- Website: www.archindy.org/bsb

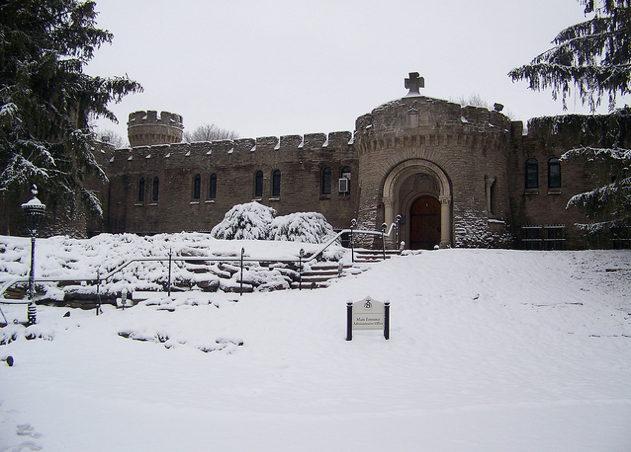

Location
- Country: United States

Current leadership
- Pope: Leo XIV
- Metropolitan Archbishop: Charles C. Thompson

Map
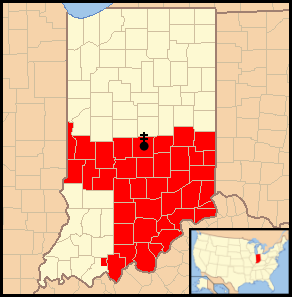

Website
- https://www.facebook.com/bruteseminary

Bishop Simon Bruté College Seminary is a Catholic college seminary located in Indianapolis, Indiana, within the Archdiocese of Indianapolis. The seminary takes its name from Bishop Simon Bruté, first bishop of the Diocese of Vinncennes, who came to Vincennes, Indiana, from Mount St. Mary's Seminary in Emmitsburg, Maryland, in 1834. Bishop Simon Bruté Seminary has provided college-level seminary formation since 2004. Seminarians from eight dioceses across the Midwestern United States reside at the seminary and take classes at Marian University.

The founder and former rector of the seminary from 2004 to 2016 was the Very Reverend Robert J. Robeson, PhD, a priest of the Archdiocese of Indianapolis. Reverend Joseph B. Moriarty was named Vice Rector in 2013 and Rector in 2016. In addition to his duties at the Seminary, Fr. Moriarty also assists with Spiritual Direction at St. Meinrad Seminary & School of Theology, as well as weekend ministry at Sts. Francis & Clare on the south side of Indianapolis. He also serves as chaplain to Marian University. The Reverend Thomas C. Widner, S.J., was appointed as first resident spiritual director in 2010. Fr. Widner died on August 13, 2018. Reverend Jonathon Fassero, O.S.B. is also a spiritual director who resides at St. Meinrad Archabbey in St. Meinrad, Indiana.

The seminary's motto, In hoc signo vinces was chosen because it was the episcopal motto of Bishop Simon Bruté. The Latin translates to: "In this sign, you will conquer."

== History ==
The seminary was established by Archbishop Daniel M. Buechlein, O.S.B. in August 2004 to prepare college seminarians for major seminary. Originally the seminary occupied part of the first floor of St. Francis Hall on the campus of Marian University, then Marian College. The seminary moved to its current location in 2008.

The first Vice Rector was Paul Etienne who was appointed bishop of the Diocese of Cheyenne, Wyoming on October 19, 2009.

The second Vice Rector was Reverend Patrick J. Beidelman, STL. He served in this position from 2009 to 2013 in addition to his duties as Director of Liturgy for the Archdiocese of Indianapolis. In 2013 he was appointed by the Most Reverend Joseph Tobin C.S.s.R. (Archbishop of Indianapolis) as the Director for the Secretariat for Spiritual Life & Worship.

The third Vice Rector was Reverend Joseph B. Moriarty.

The fourth Vice Rector was Father Justin Duvall, former Archabbot of St. Meinrad Archabbey.

Fifth Vice Rector of BSBS was Father Andrew Syberg, being named Rector in 2024 by Archbishop Charles Thompson, as former Rector Fr. Moriarty retires.

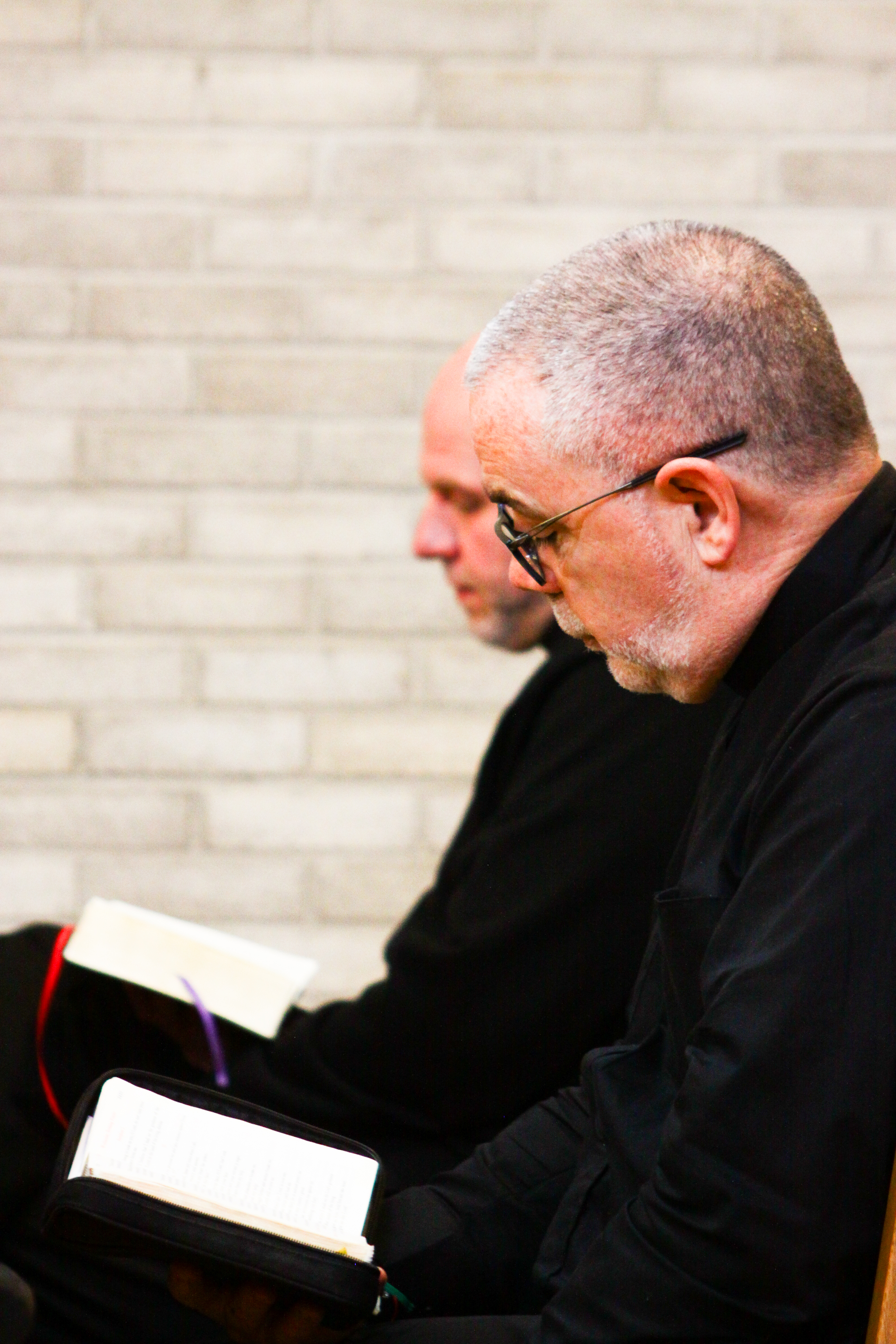

The Sixth and current (as of mid-2024) Vice Rector of the seminary is Father Peter Marshall, while continuing to serve as Pastor at St. Jude Parish, Indy.

The first alumnus of Bishop Bruté was ordained to the priesthood in the summer of 2012.

The seminary logo features the initials of Bishop Simon Bruté, "BSB". The diagonal cross located over the "S" is a reminder for priests and seminarians to embrace their daily "crosses" or sufferings, as disciples of Christ; it is also the sign (signo) of salvation referred to in the seminary motto. The "M" located within the crown above "BSB" stands for Mary, Queen of Heaven and Earth. The seminary was opened on the feast of The Nativity of the Blessed Virgin Mary, when it was placed under her patronage and protection.

== Campus ==
Located northwest of downtown Indianapolis, Indiana, the seminary occupies 18.5 acres (7.5 ha).

Upon moving to the new location, the seminary had a capacity of 38 seminarians with plans to expand in order to house as many as 60 by the fall of 2014. As of the start of the fall of 2013 the seminary has added on 10 new dorm rooms, and 2 priest apartments, this addition has expanded the occupancy to 60 men. As part of the Expansion project of 2012–13, the seminary added on a dining hall/ assembly room. The hall has been named the Archbishop Daniel Buechlein Dining Hall, after the Archbishop-Emeritus of Indianapolis. In the Fall of 2012, a renovation of the chapel was finished. The chapel had gone through many renovations in its history, this renovation bringing quite a difference! The chapel has hard wood ceilings and floors, which provide a suitable acoustic setting for the voices of the men praying or singing in common. The chapel renovations included the installation of an electric organ, expanded seating from around 30 to 72, an expanded sanctuary area, as well as a reredos. The reredos was custom designed for the seminary, to match the altar, which belonged to the late Bishop Chatard of Indianapolis. The building is distinctive for its combination of Medieval and Romanesque architecture.

The building was built in 1932 for the Carmelite Sisters of Indianapolis, the building itself was acquired by the Archdiocese of Indianapolis in 2008. The community of Carmelite Sisters was dwindling and they moved out and sold the building to the Archdiocese of Indianapolis. They joined another community in Oldenburg, Indiana.

The building has a unique history, starting with its founding by Mother Theresa Seelbach. Commonly called the "Castle on the Hill," the building is known for being exactly that, a castle. Complete with turrets, arched windows and doors, as well as a "stony/rocky" exterior, the building is unusual to the area. Started as a house of prayer and residence for the community of the Carmelites of the Resurrection, now as a seminary the building has continued its long tradition of prayer. According to Archbishop Buechlein, Bruté is first a House of Prayer, and all of the prayer and life of the seminary flows from the Mass and other liturgies.

== Mission statement ==
The Bishop Simon Bruté College Seminary will work, in collaboration with Marian University, "to protect and develop the seeds of a priestly vocation, so that the students may more easily recognize it and be in a better position to respond to it" (Pastores dabo vobis, 63).

The formation Program will provide the human, cultural, and spiritual formation, along with the academic formation grounded in the study of philosophy and theology, which will serve as a solid foundation for the major seminary (Pastores dabo vobis, 64). As such, the program will inspire seminarians to:

- Cultivate a life of prayer centered upon the Eucharist.
- Live and proclaim the Gospel of Jesus Christ through their words and actions.
- Honor Mary, the mother and model of the Church, and to live a life of virtue, love, and obedience based upon her example and guidance.
- Develop an understanding of the teachings of the Catholic Church and a commitment to live according to these teachings.
- Foster a deep respect for the human dignity of all people along with the human skills and sensitivity necessary for effective pastoral ministry.

== Represented dioceses ==
- Archdiocese of Indianapolis
- Archdiocese of Cincinnati
- Archdiocese of Louisville
- Diocese of Gary
- Diocese of Evansville
- Diocese of Owensboro
- Diocese of Springfield
- Diocese of Knoxville
- Diocese of Fort Wayne-South Bend
