= Harrison Township, Spencer County, Indiana =

Township in Spencer County, Indiana, United States

Harrison Township
- Township
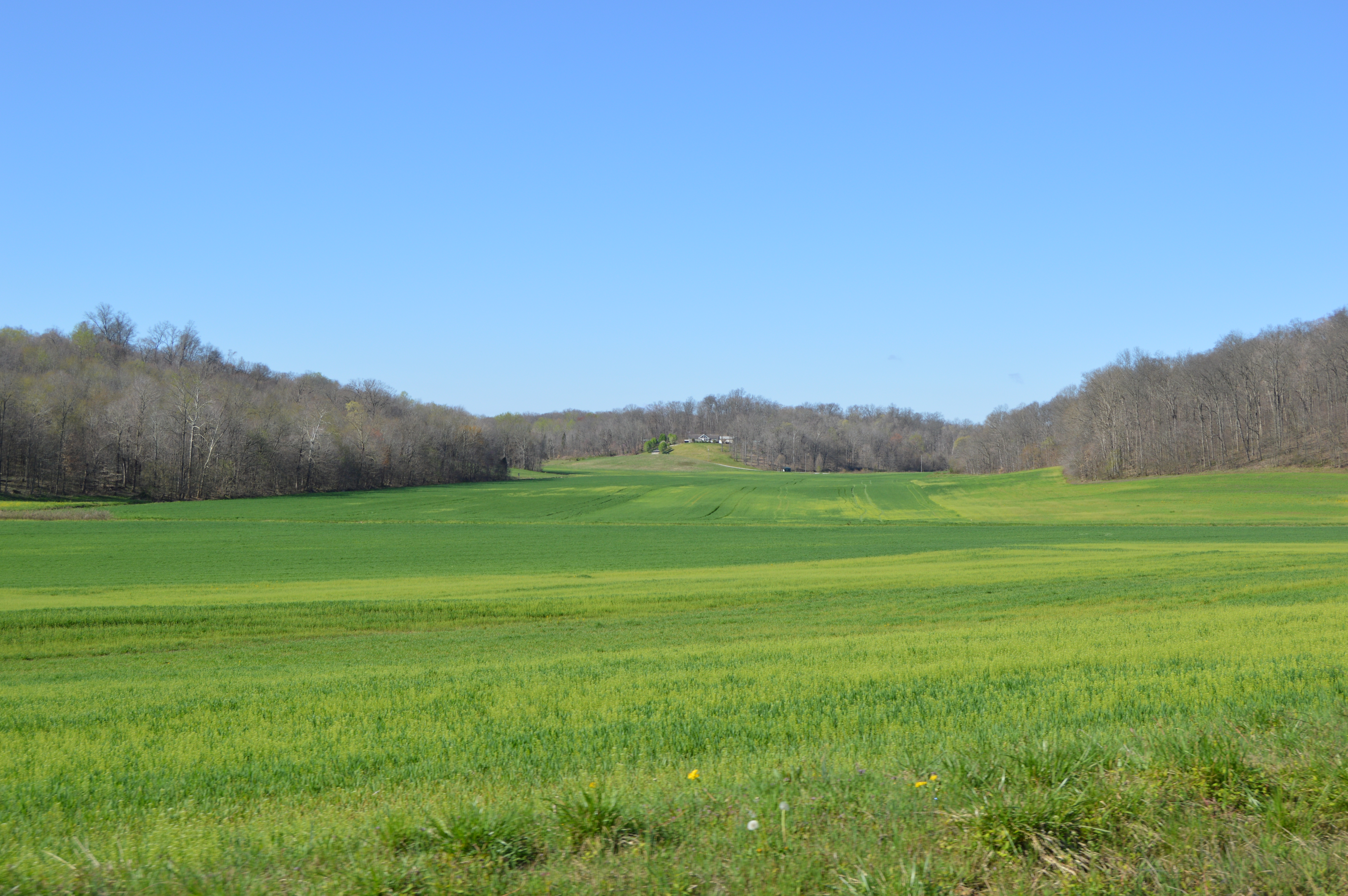
- Fields east of Fulda

- Coordinates: 38°08′05″N 86°50′27″W
- Country: United States
- State: Indiana
- County: Spencer

Government
  - Type: Indiana township

Area
  - Total: 55.18 sq mi (142.9 km^{2})
  - Land: 54.87 sq mi (142.1 km^{2})
  - Water: 0.3 sq mi (0.78 km^{2})
- Elevation: 520 ft (160 m)

Population (2020)
  - Total: 1,936
  - Density: 35.28/sq mi (13.62/km^{2})
- FIPS code: 18-31990
- GNIS feature ID: 453396

Harrison Township is one of nine townships in Spencer County, Indiana. As of the 2020 census, its population was 1,936 and it contained 744 housing units. Because of the presence of the St. Meinrad Archabbey, the Roman Catholic parishes in this township are under the jurisdiction of the Archdiocese of Indianapolis and not the Diocese of Evansville with the rest of Spencer County.

Historical population
Census	Pop.	Note	%±
1890	2,167		—
1900	2,021		−6.7%
1910	1,975		−2.3%
1920	1,760		−10.9%
1930	1,719		−2.3%
1940	1,836		6.8%
1950	2,054		11.9%
1960	2,191		6.7%
1970	2,199		0.4%
1980	2,234		1.6%
1990	2,286		2.3%
2000	2,036		−10.9%
2010	2,000		−1.8%
2020	1,936		−3.2%
Source: US Decennial Census

== History ==
Harrison Township was organized in January 1841, and named for William Henry Harrison (1773–1841) the ninth President of the United States (1841).

The Huffman Mill Covered Bridge and St. Boniface Catholic Church are listed on the National Register of Historic Places.

== Geography ==
According to the 2010 census, the township has a total area of 55.18 square miles (142.9 km^{2}), of which 54.87 square miles (142.1 km^{2}) (or 99.44%) is land and 0.3 square miles (0.78 km^{2}) (or 0.54%) is water.

=== Unincorporated towns ===
- Fulda
- Huffman
- St. Meinrad
