= George Biskup =

American prelate

His Excellency, The Most Reverend George Joseph Biskup DD
- Archbishop of Indianapolis; Titular Bishop of Hemeria
- Church: Roman Catholic Church
- See: Indianapolis
- In office: January 3, 1970 – March 20, 1979
- Predecessor: Paul Clarence Schulte
- Successor: Edward O'Meara
- Previous posts: Bishop of Des Moines (1965 to 1967); Auxiliary Bishop of Dubuque (1957 to 1965)

Orders
- Ordination: March 19, 1937 by Francesco Marchetti Selvaggiani
- Consecration: April 24, 1957 by Amleto Giovanni Cicognani

Personal details
- Born: August 23, 1911 Cedar Rapids, Iowa, US
- Died: October 17, 1979 (aged 68) Indianapolis, Indiana, US
- Education: Loras College; Pontifical Gregorian University; University of Iowa
- Motto: Cordis Eius (His heart)

George Joseph Biskup (August 23, 1911 – October 17, 1979) was an American prelate of the Roman Catholic Church. He served as archbishop of the Archdiocese of Indianapolis in Indiana from 1970 to 1979.

Biskup previously served as bishop of the Diocese of Des Moines in Iowa from 1965 to 1967 and as an auxiliary bishop of the Archdiocese of Dubuque in Iowa from 1957 to 1965.

== Biography ==
=== Early life ===
George Biskup was born on August 23, 1911, in Cedar Rapids, Iowa, to Frank and Julia (née Kuda) Biskup. He had an older brother, Leonard, and a younger sister, Helen. His father died when he was young and his mother had to go to work to support her young family. Biskup was educated at St. Wenceslaus School through high school. He studied at Loras College in Dubuque, Iowa, obtaining a Bachelor of Arts degree in 1933. He then furthered his studies at the Pontifical Gregorian University in Rome.

=== Priesthood ===
Biskup was ordained to the priesthood in Rome by Cardinal Francesco Marchetti Selvaggiani for the Archdiocese of Dubuque on March 19, 1937. Upon his return to Iowa, Biskup served as a curate at St. Raphael's Cathedral Parish in Dubuque until 1939. Biskup took up graduate studies in the fine arts at the University of Iowa in Iowa City, Iowa while serving as the administrator of Holy Trinity Parish in Walford, Iowa. Biskup became a faculty member in 1939 of Loras College, where he founded the art department and served as artist in residence.

In 1948, Biskup was then called to Rome to work as an official of the Congregation for the Oriental Churches. During his years in Rome, the Vatican named him as monsignor. Again returning to Iowa, he was named pastor of St. Joseph's Parish in Key West, Iowa, and chancellor of the archdiocese in 1951. Biskup was appointed vicar general in 1952, and served as a chaplain at the Presentation Sisters Convent (1952–1958).

=== Auxiliary Bishop of Dubuque ===
On March 9, 1957, Biskup was appointed titular bishop of Hemeria and auxiliary bishop of Dubuque by Pope Pius XII. He received his episcopal consecration on April 24, 1957, from Archbishop Amleto Cicognani at St. Raphael's Cathedral. Archbishop Leo Binz and Bishop Loras Lane served as co-consecrators. In addition to his episcopal duties, Biskup served as pastor of the Church of the Nativity Parish in Dubuque from 1958 to 1965. Biskup attended all four sessions of the Second Vatican Council (Vatican II; 1962–1965) in Rome. He was named the administrator of the archdiocese sede vacante after the Vatican moved Archbishop Binz to the Archdiocese of St. Paul.

=== Bishop of Des Moines ===
Biskup was named by Pope Paul VI as the fifth bishop of Des Moines on February 3, 1965. He was installed on March 19, 1965, in St. Ambrose Cathedral in Des Moines, Iowa.. In 1966 he purchased 55 acres (220,000 m^{2}) from the Des Moines Golf and Country Club in West Des Moines to construct Dowling Catholic High School. He also started to implement the changes in the church as a result of Vatican II.

=== Coadjutor Archbishop and Archbishop of Indianapolis ===
Biskup was appointed by Paul VI as coadjutor archbishop of Indianapolis and titular archbishop of Tamalluma on July 20, 1967. He was formally received into the archdiocese at Saints Peter and Paul Cathedral in Indianapolis, Indiana, on October 10, 1967, and also served as pastor of Holy Cross Parish in that city.

Following the resignation of Archbishop Paul Schulte, Biskup automatically succeeded him as the third archbishop of Indianapolis on January 3, 1970. He supported the concept of Total Catholic Education and established lay boards of education to govern parochial schools. It was also during Biskup's tenure that the archdiocese became nationally known for its holistic approach to Catholic education under the superintendent of Catholic schools, Reverend Gerald Andrew Gettelfinger.

=== Retirement and death ===
On March 20, 1979, Pope John Paul II accepted Biskup's resignation as archbishop of Indianapolis. George Biskup died at St. Vincent Hospital in Indianapolis on October 17, 1979, at age 68. He is buried at Calvary Chapel Mausoleum in Indianapolis.

Catholic Church titles
Preceded by Edward Celestin Daly, O.P.	Bishop of Des Moines; 1965–1967	Succeeded by Maurice John Dingman
Preceded by Paul Clarence Schulte	Archbishop of Indianapolis; 1970–1979	Succeeded by Edward O'Meara
