= WSOM =

Radio station in Franklin, Indiana

Simulcast of WSPM, Cloverdale, Indiana
- Franklin, Indiana; United States
- Broadcast area: Johnson County
- Frequency: 89.5 MHz
- Branding: Catholic Radio Indy

Programming
- Format: Catholic radio

Ownership
- Owner: Inter Mirifica, Inc.

History
- First air date: October 15, 1960
- Former call signs: WFCI (1960–2022)

Technical information
- Licensing authority: FCC
- Facility ID: 22336
- Class: A
- ERP: 4 kW
- HAAT: 66 m (217 ft)
- Transmitter coordinates: 39°24′29″N 86°08′52″W

Links
- Public license information: Public file; LMS
- Website: catholicradioindy.org

WSOM (89.5 FM) is a radio station in Franklin, Indiana, United States. Owned by Inter Mirifica, Inc., the station is part of its regional Catholic Radio Indy network.

The station was built as WFCI by Franklin College in 1960. WFCI was originally a student-programmed station, which broadcast various music formats over the years as well as Franklin College sports events. After a license challenge in 2004, WFCI entered an agreement to rebroadcast public radio station WFYI-FM in Indianapolis. In 2022, Franklin College sold the station, which had become redundant in its coverage area and sports broadcasts.

== History ==
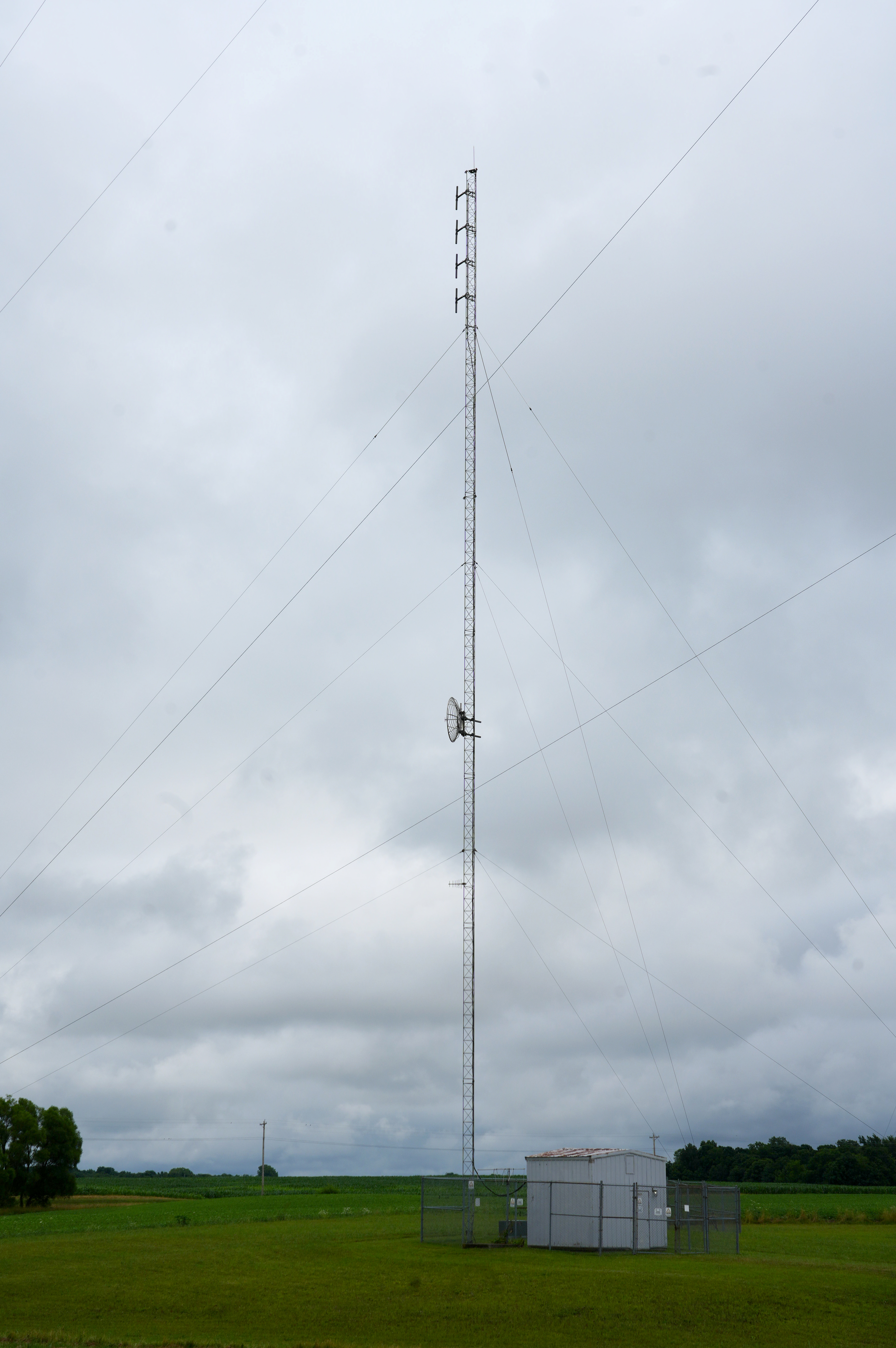
The WFCI transmitter tower at Trafalgar, Indiana

WFCI began broadcasting at 89.3 MHz on October 15, 1960. Broadcasting from a tower emblazoned with the call letters atop Yandell Cline Hall on the FC campus, the station's initial programming featured classical music, educational features, and local college and high school sports events.

Like many noncommercial educational stations of the time, WFCI initially broadcast with 10 watts. However, by the late 1970s, the station began exploring a power increase. In May 1976, the station applied to move to 89.5 MHz and increase its power to 4,000 watts. The move was prompted when a co-channel college radio station in Louisville, Kentucky, offered to donate its 3,000-watt transmitter to Franklin College as it pursued a power increase of its own. The proposed technical changes met with a detractor: WRTV, the channel 6 television station in Indianapolis. Channel 6, between 82 and 88 MHz, is adjacent to the noncommercial educational reserved band. WRTV warned that the WFCI power boost would impair reception of its signal in Franklin. The WRTV dispute dragged on, with the WFCI improvements in the balance, until the two parties settled in 1981; WRTV dropped its opposition and the station cut back its planned increase to 500 watts. After having been with the station since its beginning, founding director Raymond Cowan retired at the end of the 1984–85 school year.

It would not be until 1985, however, that the power increase finally occurred. After being silent all year, WFCI activated a new transmitter facility on the WTTV tower near Trafalgar and increased its power to 1,000 watts that October. By this time, the station was airing a contemporary hit radio format tailored to a student audience.

WFCI shifted toward a more typical alternative rock music format in the 1990s, putting it up against Indianapolis station WRZX (103.3 FM).

=== Partnership with WFYI ===
In the summer of 2004, several Indiana radio station licenses were challenged by Hoosier Public Radio of Greenfield, run by Marty Hensley. These school-operated stations, including WFCI, did not broadcast a full 24-hour day, and Hoosier tried to force them into sharing time with them on their frequencies by way of a little-used Federal Communications Commission (FCC) rule. This produced a problem for WFCI, because it was entirely run by student DJs. In the wake of the challenge, WFCI began broadcasting 24 hours a day with the aid of automation equipment.

In January 2005, Franklin College announced it would strike a partnership with Indianapolis public radio station WFYI-FM to begin simulcasting its programming; in exchange for air time, Franklin College journalism students would be offered partnerships and internships at WFYI-FM. The WFYI-FM partnership also provided a strong public radio signal to Johnson County for the first time. Talks between the two began in late 2004 when WFYI visited the college for an Indiana gubernatorial debate. WFYI-FM programming began airing on WFCI on January 31, 2005; the station's only opt-outs from WFYI-FM programming were student-produced broadcasts of college sporting events.

=== Sale to Catholic Radio Indy ===
In 2022, Franklin College announced it would sell WFCI to Inter Mirifica, the operating organization of WSPM–WSQM "Catholic Radio Indy". In opting to sell the station, the college cited the redundancy of its broadcasts to WFYI-FM, which now covered Johnson County, and the migration of Franklin College sports broadcasts to digital live streams as part of the institution's major in sports communication. The $400,000 sale was consummated on October 19, 2022, at which time the station switched to airing Catholic Radio Indy. Inter Mirifica was granted approval to change the call sign to WSOM effective November 8, 2022.
