= Gerald Andrew Gettelfinger =

American prelate

His Excellency, The Most Reverend Gerald Andrew Gettelfinger
- Bishop Emeritus of Evansville
- See: Diocese of Evansville
- Appointed: March 11, 1989
- Installed: April 11, 1989
- Retired: April 26, 2011
- Predecessor: Francis Raymond Shea
- Successor: Charles C. Thompson

Orders
- Ordination: May 7, 1961 by Paul Clarence Schulte
- Consecration: April 11, 1989 by Edward Thomas O'Meara, Thomas J. O'Brien, and Daniel M. Buechlein

Personal details
- Born: October 20, 1935 (age 90) Ramsey, Indiana, USA
- Education: Saint Meinrad Seminary and School of Theology; Butler University
- Motto: Dominus pars The Lord is a part (of me)

Styles of Gerald Andrew Gettelfinger
- Reference style: His Excellency; The Most Reverend
- Spoken style: Your Excellency
- Religious style: Bishop

Gerald Andrew Gettelfinger (born October 20, 1935) is an American prelate of the Roman Catholic Church who served as the bishop of the Diocese of Evansville in Indiana from 1989 to 2011.

== Biography ==
=== Early life ===
Gerald Gettelfinger was born in Ramsey, Indiana, on October 20, 1935. He was the fourth of eight children of Gerald and Mary Gettelfinger. He attended St. Meinrad High School in St. Meinrad, Indiana, graduating in 1953. Gettelfinger then entered Saint Meinrad School of Theology, where he graduated in 1957.

=== Priesthood ===
On May 7, 1961, Gettelfinger was ordained a priest for the Archdiocese of Indianapolis in St. Meinrad by Archbishop Paul Schulte. In 1969, Gettelfinger earned a Master of Education degree from Butler University in Indianapolis, Indiana. Gettelfinger served as chancellor of the archdiocese from 1980 to 1988 and vicar general from 1988 to 1989.

=== Bishop of Evansville ===
On March 11, 1989, Pope John Paul II appointed Gettelfinger as bishop of the Diocese of Evansville. He was consecrated on April 11, 1989, with Archbishop Edward O'Meara serving as the principal consecrator.

In 1998, Gettelfinger was named as bishop liaison to the National Catholic Committee on Scouting (NCCS). He was a chaplain at the 2001 National Scout Jamboree and trekked at the Philmont Scout Ranch, operated by the Boy Scouts of America in New Mexico, as part of the NCCS Saint George Trek. Gettelfinger received the Silver Buffalo Award in 2005.

At the May 2002 meeting of the US Conference of Catholic Bishops, Gettelfinger opposed a one-strike policy against sexual abusers in the clergy in the Charter for the Protection of Children and Young People. At the November 2002 USCCB meeting, he was one of seven bishops who voted against the new policies. He has admitted to allowing at least one convicted child molester serve as a priest in the diocese, as well as other known molesters.

=== Retirement ===
On April 27, 2011, Pope Benedict XVI accepted Gettelfinger's resignation as bishop of Evansville, replacing him with Bishop Charles C. Thompson. On June 10, 2021, a special mass was celebrated at St. Benedict Cathedral in Evansville to honor Gettelfinger.

== See also ==
- Catholic Church hierarchy
- Catholic Church in the United States
- Historical list of the Catholic bishops of the United States
- List of Catholic bishops of the United States
- Lists of patriarchs, archbishops, and bishops

Catholic Church titles
Preceded by Francis Raymond Shea	Bishop of Evansville; 1989–2011	Succeeded by Charles C. Thompson
