= Gettelfinger =

Gettelfinger is a surname. Notable people with the surname include:

- Gerald Andrew Gettelfinger (born 1935), American Roman Catholic bishop
- Ron Gettelfinger (born 1944), American trade union leader
- Sara Gettelfinger (born c. 1977), American actress, singer, and dancer
