= Ralph S. Pfau =

Father Ralph S. Pfau, also known as Father John Doe (10 November 1904 - 19 February 1967) was the author of Sobriety Without End, Sobriety and Beyond and the Golden Book series. He is believed to have been the first Roman Catholic priest to enter Alcoholics Anonymous (AA).

== Early life ==
Pfau was born on November 10, 1904, the youngest of five brothers. A sixth brother had died before he was born. His father, who was of French and German descent, died when Pfau was four. Pfau was raised by his mother, who came from an Indiana German family.

They were devout Catholics. Several family members had served the church: his uncle George was a priest. His uncle Al was the Bishop of Nashville, Tennessee. His older brother Jerome was a priest who had earned a doctorate from Rome, and taught at St. Mary-of-the-Woods College.

Ralph's mother referred to him as her son who was going to become a priest, which created pressure on him as he was growing up.

== Education ==
He was ordained at St. Meinrad Seminary, and received a Master of Arts in Education at Fordham University. He became a priest in the Archdiocese of Indianapolis,

== Career ==
On June 29, 1942, Pfau was appointed pastor of St. Ann's of Indianapolis by Bishop Ritter. Pfau remained in service at St. Ann's until June 14, 1943.

He was unsure he wanted to be a priest, and for many years, especially during his periods in sanitariums, and during the worst periods of his alcoholism, he continued to doubt the validity of his ordination. But he eventually came to believe that, though he had not chosen the priesthood, he was chosen for it.

== Alcoholism and recovery ==
He took his first drink about a year after his ordination. By 1943 he was sufficiently worried about his drinking to investigate A.A. He experienced nervous breakdowns and spent time in sanitariums. He was twice relieved of his parish.

Even after achieving sobriety, he continued to be plagued by depressions.

He learned about AA when calling on a parishioner who was thought to be dying but was just passed out from alcohol and drugs. Pfau noticed a copy of the book, Alcoholics Anonymous on the shelf. He borrowed and read it. He stopped drinking. Later he read pamphlets on AA left by a member in the church.

During this period of not drinking he stepped up the medication the doctor had prescribed, a combination of barbital and Dexedrine.

He eventually called the person whose name was on the brochures, Doherty Sheerin, who introduced Pfau to the program.

That was November 10, 1941, Pfau's 37th birthday.

For the next 25 years, despite severe problems with depressions, he never took another drink. For a short time he continued to take medications prescribed by his doctor and by Mayo Clinic. He threw them away after discussing the problem with a doctor familiar with alcoholism.

== Helping other alcoholics ==
With the approval of his Archbishop, he devoted himself to helping other alcoholics, particularly alcoholic priests. He traveled more than 50,000 miles a year to address meetings, conduct retreats and help individuals.

His retreats were attended by thousands of Catholics and by many more thousands who were not Catholics. His retreat talks were eventually published in a series of 14 Golden Books. They were so named because when he held the second annual retreat in June 1947, at the request of some of the people who had attended the first retreat his talks were printed in a fifty-six page booklet with a gold cover, and distributed as a souvenir, through the generosity of the owner of the archdiocesan newspaper in Indianapolis. People began requesting copies of "the golden book of your retreat."

In 1948 he founded the National Clergy Conference on Alcoholism, an organization devoted to the problems of priests, and directed it for many years. Its publications, especially "Alcoholism Source Book for Priests," and the annual "Blue Book," made a deep impact on the American Catholic Hierarchy.

== Role of religion in Alcoholics Anonymous ==
Pfau favored limiting religious references to the absolute minimum in order to avoid offending newcomers.

== Quote about Pfau ==
"the whole career of Father Pfau can only be understood in the light of the fact that he was a pioneer. He broke new ground. ... Like any pioneer he met opposition and had to have fortitude. Like any Christian innovator he had to have deep faith. It was faith and fortitude that sustained his zeal for the salvation of the countless souls he helped." - Fr. John C. Ford, S. J., in an Epilogue to an edition of Pfau's autobiography, published after his death.

== Bibliography ==
- Sobriety Without End Hazelden reprint 1997 ISBN 1-56838-327-4 ISBN 978-1568383279
- Sobriety and Beyond Hazelden reprint 1997 ISBN 1-56838-242-1 ISBN 978-1568382425
- The Golden Book series (total of 14 books):
  - The Golden Book of Passion Hazelden 1960 ISBN 1-56838-334-7 ISBN 978-1568383347
  - The Golden Book of Resentments Hazelden 1955 ISBN 1-56838-244-8 ISBN 978-1568382449
  - The Golden Book of Sponsorship Hazelden 1953 ISBN 1-56838-236-7 ISBN 978-1568382364
  - The Golden Book of the Spiritual Side Hazelton 1947 ISBN 1-56838-237-5 ISBN 978-1568382371
  - The Golden Book of Sanity Hazelden 1957 ISBN 1-56838-241-3 ISBN 978-1568382418
  - The Golden Book of Attitudes Hazelden 1949 ISBN 1-56838-243-X ISBN 9781568382432
  - The Golden Book of Living Hazelden 1964 ISBN 1-56838-332-0 ISBN 9781568383323
  - The Golden Book of Principles Hazelden 1954 ISBN 1-56838-333-9 ISBN 9781568383330
  - The Golden Book of Happiness Hazelden 1951 ISBN 1-56838-239-1 ISBN 9781568382395
  - The Golden Book of Sanctity Hazelden 1967 ISBN 1-56838-575-7 ISBN 9781568385754
  - The Golden Book of Excuses Hazelden 1952 ISBN 1-56838-335-5 ISBN 9781568383354
  - The Golden Book of Tolerance Hazelden 1948 ISBN 1-56838-371-1 ISBN 9781568383712
  - The Golden Book of Action Hazelden 1950 ISBN 1-56838-238-3 ISBN 9781568382388
  - The Golden Book of Decisions Hazelden 1957 ISBN 1-56838-240-5 ISBN 9781568382401
- Pfau also issued a set of thirty LP records followed by, several years later, a set of fifteen audio cassette tapes that covered thirty of his talks in which he spoke on various issues, including No. 11 “Father John Doe -- Alcoholic,” No. 22 “The Lord’s Prayer,” No. 2 “Alcoholism -- Sin or Disease,” and Nos. 23-26 “The Twelve Steps.”
- Prodigal Shepherd by Father Ralph Pfau and Al Hirshberg. Philadelphia: Lippincott, 1958. Father Pfau had planned that this new edition of his autobiography be published, as had his previous works, under his pen name "Fr. John Doe." But since he died prior to its publication it was decided to use his name.
