= Charles C. Thompson =

American prelate (born 1961)

His Excellency, The Most Reverend Charles Coleman Thompson
- Archbishop of Indianapolis
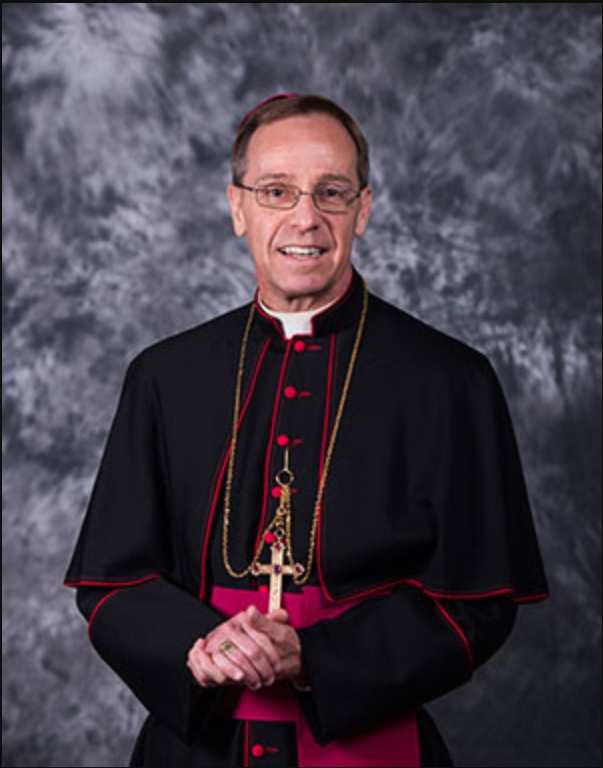
- See: Archdiocese of Indianapolis
- Appointed: June 13, 2017
- Installed: July 28, 2017
- Predecessor: Joseph W. Tobin
- Previous posts: Diocese of Evansville; 2011 - 2017

Orders
- Ordination: May 30, 1987 by Thomas C. Kelly
- Consecration: June 29, 2011 by Joseph Edward Kurtz, Daniel M. Buechlein, Thomas C. Kelly, and Gerald Andrew Gettelfinger

Personal details
- Born: April 11, 1961 (age 65) Louisville, Kentucky, USA
- Denomination: Catholic Church
- Education: Bellarmine University; Saint Meinrad School of Theology; St. Paul University
- Motto: Christ the cornerstone

Styles of Charles Coleman Thompson
- Reference style: His Excellency; The Most Reverend
- Spoken style: Your Excellency
- Religious style: Archbishop

Ordination history of Charles C. Thompson
History
Episcopal consecration
- Consecrated by: Joseph Edward Kurtz
- Date: June 29, 2011
Episcopal succession
Bishops consecrated by Charles C. Thompson as principal consecrator
- Robert John McClory: February 11, 2020

Charles Coleman Thompson (born April 11, 1961) is an American Catholic prelate who has served as Archbishop of Indianapolis since 2017. He previously served as Bishop of Evansville from 2011 to 2017.

== Career ==
=== Early life ===
Charles Thompson was born on April 11, 1961, in Louisville, Kentucky. He attended Bellarmine College in Louisville, graduating with a Bachelor of Accounting degree. Thompson earned a Master of Divinity degree at Saint Meinrad School of Theology in St. Meinrad, Indiana and a Licentiate of Canon Law at St. Paul University in Ottawa, Ontario.

=== Priesthood ===
On May 30, 1987, Thompson was ordained into the priesthood for the Archdiocese of Louisville by Archbishop Thomas Kelly. After his ordination, Thompson served until 1990 as associate pastor at St. Joseph Pro-Cathedral Parish and as chaplain at Bethlehem High School, both in Bardstown, Kentucky. In 1992, he resumed work part-time as an associate pastor at St. Francis of Assisi Parish in Louisville. In 1993, Thompson was named metropolitan vicar and director of tribunals for the diocese. He administered St. Peter Claver Parish in Louisville from 1994 to 1996 and also served as a chaplain for the Presentation Academy in Louisville from 1995 to 1997.

In 1996, Thompson was assigned as pastor at St. Augustine Parish in Lebanon, Kentucky. He was named defender of the bond and judge of the Diocesan Tribunal in 1998. Thompson was appointed pastor in 2002 of Holy Trinity Parish and chaplain of Sacred Heart Academy, both in Louisville. In addition to his pastoral work at Holy Trinity, Thompson was appointed vicar general in 2008.

=== Bishop of Evansville ===
Coat of Arms as Bishop of Evansville

Pope Benedict XVI appointed Thompson as the fifth bishop of the Diocese of Evansville on April 26, 2011. He was consecrated by Archbishop Joseph Kurtz on June 29, 2011, at Roberts Municipal Stadium in Evansville. The co-consecrators were Archbishop Daniel M. Buechlein, Archbishop Thomas C. Kelly, and Bishop Gerald Gettelfinger.

=== Archbishop of Indianapolis ===
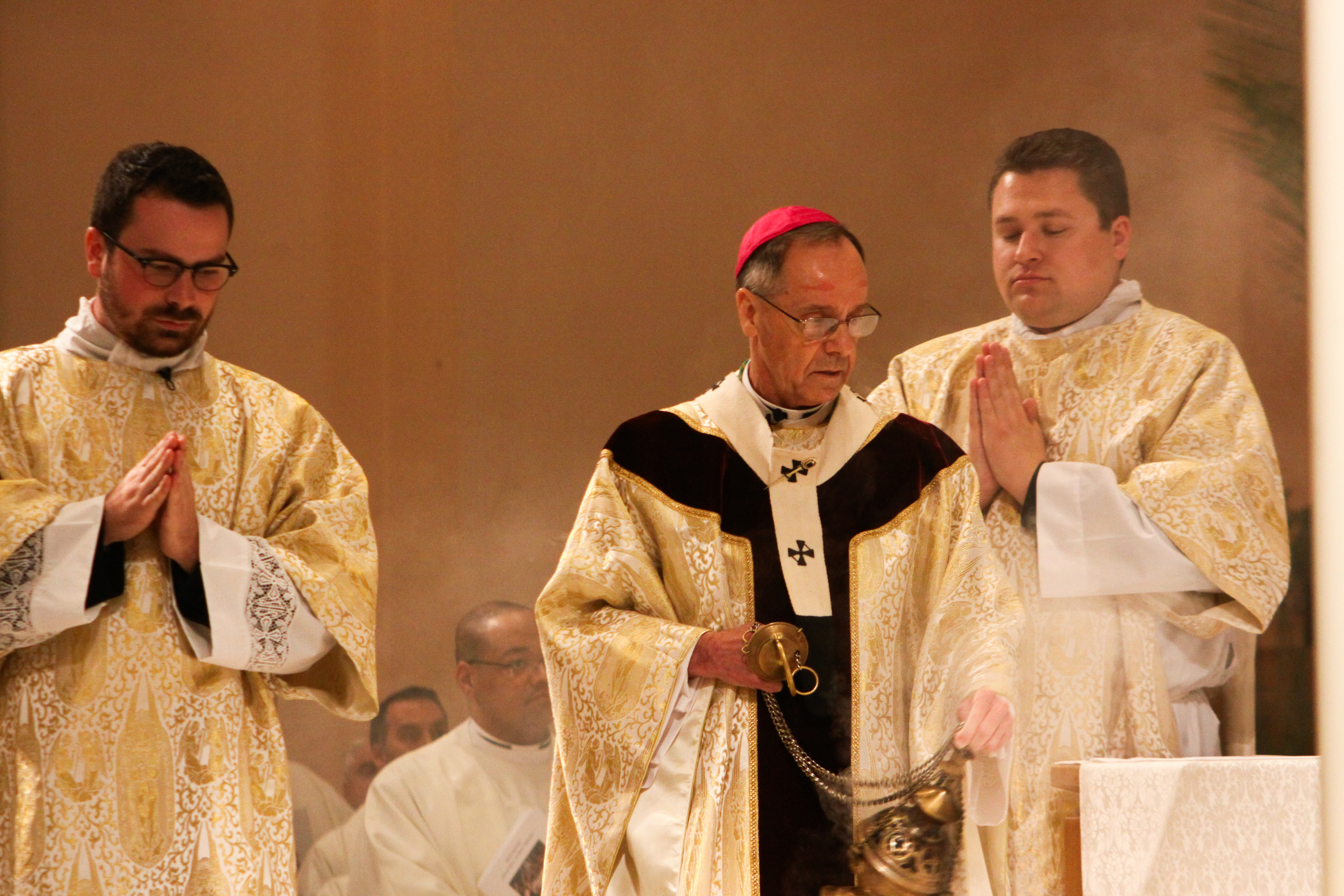

Pope Francis appointed Thompson as archbishop of Indianapolis on June 13, 2017. He was installed on July 28, 2017. Thompson was the youngest American archbishop at the time of his installation.

Soon after his installation, Thompson ordered three Catholic high schools in Indianapolis to terminate three employees who had entered into same-sex marriages.

Brebeuf Jesuit Preparatory School in early 2019 refused to fire Layton Payne-Elliot, a male teacher who married Joshua Payne-Elliot in 2017. After negotiating attempts with Brebeuf failed, Thompson suspended the Catholic status of the school in June 2019. Brebeuf appealed his decision to the Congregation for Catholic Education in Rome, which in April 2020 temporarily rescinded Thompson's order. The Vatican then assigned Cardinal Joseph Tobin to mediate the dispute. The Indiana Supreme Court in August 2022 upheld the right of the archdiocese to fire Joshua Payne-Elliot.

Roncalli High School fired two guidance counselors, Shelly Fitzgerald and Lynn Starkey, both of whom had married other women. Fitzgerald and Starkey sued the archdiocese and Thompson in separate cases, alleging discrimination and retaliation. In August 2021, the US Southern District of Indiana dismissed the Starkey lawsuit.

Cathedral High School fired Joshua Payne-Elliot, a teacher who married Layton Payne-Elliot in 2017. In a statement, Cathedral said that defying the archbishop could have meant losing its non-profit tax status. Joshua Payne-Elliot sued the archdiocese, but the case was dismissed in Marion County Superior Court in May 2021.

== See also ==
- Catholic Church hierarchy
- Catholic Church in the United States
- Historical list of the Catholic bishops of the United States
- List of Catholic bishops of the United States
- Lists of patriarchs, archbishops, and bishops

Catholic Church titles
Preceded by Joseph W. Tobin	Archbishop of Indianapolis; 2017–present	Incumbent
Preceded by Gerald Andrew Gettelfinger	Bishop of Evansville; 2011–2017	Succeeded by Joseph M. Siegel
