= Fulda, Indiana =

- Unincorporated community
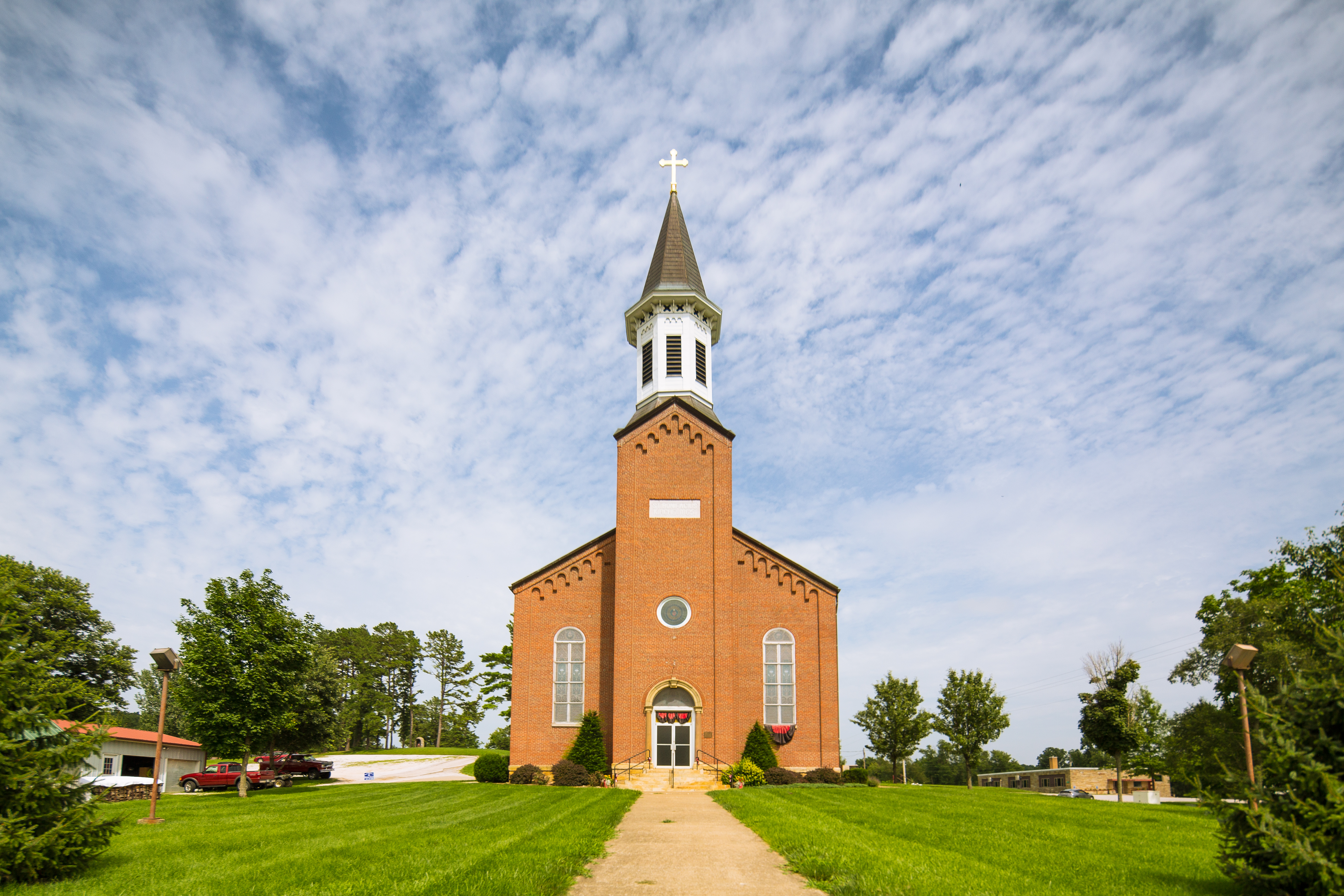
- St. Boniface Catholic Church; Fulda, Indiana

- Location within Indiana Location within the United States
- Coordinates: 38°06′41″N 86°50′10″W
- Country: United States
- State: Indiana
- County: Spencer
- Township: Harrison
- Elevation: 486 ft (148 m)
- Time zone: UTC-6 (Central (CST))
  - Summer (DST): UTC-5 (CDT)
- ZIP code: 47531
- Area codes: 812, 930
- FIPS code: 18-26116
- GNIS feature ID: 434887

Fulda is an unincorporated community in Harrison Township, Spencer County, in the U.S. state of Indiana. The Spencer County Memorial Forest features a World War II veterans memorial.

== History ==
Fulda was laid out in the 1840s. The community was originally built up chiefly by Germans, who named it after Fulda, in Germany. A post office was established at Fulda in 1850, and remained in operation until it was discontinued in 1995.

The elementary school closed at the end of the 1972–73 school year; the following school year, all of the students were then bused to St. Meinrad to attend school.

St. Boniface Catholic Church was listed on the National Register of Historic Places in 1980.

== Geography ==
Fulda is located at 38°06′41″N 86°50′10″W.
