= Saint Meinrad Seminary and School of Theology =

Catholic seminary in Indiana, US

- Type: Seminary and school of theology
- Established: 1857
- Affiliations: Catholic Church (St. Meinrad Archabbey)
- Rector: Denis Robinson
- Students: 191 (119 full-time, 72 part-time) (2023)
- Location: Saint Meinrad, Indiana, United States; 38.166008°N 86.810636°W
- Campus: 250 acres (1.0 km^{2}); Rural
- Website: www.saintmeinrad.edu

The Saint Meinrad Seminary and School of Theology is a Catholic seminary and school of theology in Saint Meinrad, Indiana, United States. It is affiliated with the Saint Meinrad Archabbey. The institution was named after Meinrad of Einsiedeln, a ninth-century hermit living in what is today Switzerland.

== History ==
In 1857, several Benedictine monks travelled from Einsiedeln Abbey in Einsiedeln, Switzerland, to southern Indiana to establish Saint Meinrad Seminary. At its beginning, Saint Meinrad was a high school program. By 1861, the monks had added courses in philosophy, business, theology and classical literature. A fire in 1887 destroyed the seminary buildings.

When Saint Meinrad reopened after the 1887 fire, it focused only on preparing seminarians for priesthood. It had two divisions:

- A minor seminary with four years of high school and the first two years of college
- A major seminary with two years of college courses in philosophy and theology

In 1959, Saint Meinrad reorganized into three divisions:

- A traditional four year high school, which closed in 1968.
- A four-year college, which closed in 1998.
- A theologate, or graduate school of theology

In 1996, the seminary was censured by the American Association of University Professors for the firing of a tenured theology professor, Mercy Sr. Carmel McEnroy, allegedly without due process.

In February 2019, after an internal investigation, Saint Meinrad added two priests to the Diocese of Evansville list of clergy with credible accusations of sexual abuse. The first was Warren Heitz who was accused of misconduct dating from the 1970s to 1999. Removed from public ministry in 2002, he spent ten years living in a supervised residence for offenders at Saint Meinrad. In addition, Robert Woerdeman had faced one accusation of misconduct. He was defrocked as a priest in 1975.

== Academics ==
Saint Meinrad offers the following advanced degrees:

- Master of Divinity
- Master of Theological Studies
- Master of Arts in Catholic Philosophical Studies
- Master of Arts (Theology)
- Master of Arts (Pastoral Theology)

Saint Meinrad offers programs in:

- Priesthood formation
- Theological formation for permanent deacon candidates
- Lay degrees in theology
- Continuing adult education
- Youth leadership

History at a glance
Saint Meinrad Abbey's school	Established	1857
Type	secondary school
Saint Meinrad College	Opened	1861
Type	liberal arts college
Closed	1887 due to fire
Transferred to	Jasper Academy
Saint Meinrad Seminary	Opened	1887
Type	major seminary, minor seminary
Saint Meinrad High School, Seminary, and College	Reorganized	1959
Type	major seminary, minor seminary, liberal arts college, secondary school
Saint Meinrad College	Closed	1998

Saint Meinrad is accredited by the Association of Theological Schools. It has also been accredited by the Higher Learning Commission or its predecessor, the North Central Association of Colleges and Schools, continuously since 1979.

== Alumni ==
=== Ordinaries ===
- Ralph S. Pfau, author

=== Deceased alumni cardinals ===
- Joseph Cardinal Ritter, O'1917; Archdiocese of St. Louis

=== Living alumni bishops ===
- Paul J. Bradley, DD, O'1971; Diocese of Kalamazoo
- J. Douglas Deshotel, DD, O`1978; Diocese of Dallas - Auxiliary
- Gerald A. Gettelfinger, DD, O'1961; Diocese of Evansville (retired)
- James Vann Johnston, DD, T'1990; Diocese of Kansas City-St. Joseph
- Peter A. Libasci, DD, O'1977; Diocese of Manchester
- William F. Medley, DD, O'1982; Diocese of Owensboro
- Patrick Pinder, DD, O'1979; Archdiocese of Nassau
- David L. Ricken, DD, O'1980; Diocese of Green Bay
- James Peter Sartain, DD, O'1978; Archdiocese of Seattle
- Joseph M. Siegel, STL, O'1988; Diocese of Evansville
- David P. Talley T`1989; Diocese of Memphis
- Anthony B. Taylor, DD, O'1980; Diocese of Little Rock
- Charles C. Thompson, DD, T'1987; Archdiocese of Indianapolis

=== Deceased alumni bishops ===
- Herman J. Alerding, O'1868; Diocese of Fort Wayne
- John G. Bennett, O'1914; Diocese of Lafayette-in-Indiana
- Daniel M. Buechlein, Archdiocese of Indianapolis
- William D. Borders, DD, O'1940; Archdiocese of Baltimore
- Joseph Chartrand, O'1892; Diocese of Indianapolis
- Francis R. Cotton, O'1920 Diocese of Owensboro
- Joseph R. Crowley, O'1953; Diocese of Fort Wayne-South Bend (Auxiliary Emeritus)
- Robert W. Donnelly, DD, O'1957; Diocese of Toledo - Auxiliary
- Laurence J. FitzSimon, O'1921; Diocese of Amarillo
- James R. Hoffman, O'1958; Diocese of Toledo
- Thomas F. Lillis, O'1885; Diocese Kansas City, MO
- Denis O'Donaghue, O'1874; Diocese of Louisville (Emeritus)
- Theodore Revermann, O'1901; Diocese of Superior
- Thomas J. O'Brien, DD, O'1961; Diocese of Phoenix
- Carl F. Mengeling, STD, O'1957; Diocese of Lansing

=== Others ===
- James Peter Allen, 1968 graduate - Egyptologist and Professor at Brown University
- Ron Broglio, Professor at Arizona State University.
- Cyprian Davis, OSB, Black Catholic historian and the first African-American to join the St Meinrad monks.
- Joseph A. Favazza, 11th president of Saint Anselm College.
- Luke Timothy Johnson, Ph.D., author and professor at the Candler School of Emory University.
- Thomas Scecina, US Army chaplain killed during the sinking of the Japanese prison ship Arisan Maru in 1944.
