= Ron Broglio =

American academic

Interviews with Broglio
- Animal revolution with Ron Broglio (Knowing Animals)
- Animal Revolution (New Books Network)

Ron Broglio (born 1966) is an American academic who is a Professor in the Department of English at Arizona State University. His research addresses animal studies, environmental humanities, art history, museum studies, British literature, and romanticism.

== Career ==
Broglio read for a Bachelor of Arts in English and philosophy at the St. Meinrad College (a now-closed division of Saint Meinrad Seminary and School of Theology) graduating in 1988. He then undertook postgraduate work in world religions at Loyola University New Orleans (1989–91) and in British literature at Boston College (Master of Arts, graduating 1993). He undertook a PhD in romanticism and literary theory at the University of Florida, graduating in 1999. His thesis was entitled Romantic Transformation: Visions of Difference in Blake and Wordsworth, and his committee included Donald Ault, John Leavey, John Murchek, and Gayle Zachmann. While undertaking postgraduate study, Broglio taught at both Boston College and the University of Florida.

After completing his postgraduate studies, held an adjunct position at the University of Alabama (1999-2000) and then a postdoctoral research position at the Georgia Institute of Technology (2000–02). He took up an Assistant Professorship at Georgia Tech in 2002, where he remained until 2009 (including two years at Blekinge Institute of Technology). His first book, Technologies of the Picturesque, was published in 2008. From 2009-10, Broglio took up an Associate Professorship at Georgia Gwinnett College before moving to Arizona State University in 2010 as an assistant professor.

Broglio's second book, Surface Encounters, was published in 2011. In 2012, Broglio was promoted to associate professor. He published his third book, Beasts of Burden: Biopolitics, Labor, and Animal Life in British Romanticism in 2017, and was promoted to Full Professor in 2018. His fourth book, Animal Revolution, was published in 2022. It featured illustrations by Marina Zurkow and an afterword by Eugene Thacker.

== Select bibliography ==
Broglio has published over 20 articles in peer-reviewed journals, and more than ten chapters in scholarly collections. He has served as an associate editor for the journal Romantic Circles, and book review editor of Configurations. He has also guest-edited special issues of Angelaki, Art and Research, Romantic Circles Praxis, and Configurations.

- Broglio, Ron (2008). Technologies of the Picturesque. Bucknell University Press.
- Broglio, Ron (2011). Surface Encounters: Thinking With Animals and Art. University of Minnesota Press.
- Broglio, Ron, and Frederick Young, eds. (2015). Being Human: Between Animals and Technology. Routledge.
- Broglio, Ron (2017). Beasts of Burden: Biopolitics, Labor, and Animal Life in British Romanticism. State University of New York Press.
- Turner, Lynn, Undine Sellbach, and Ron Broglio, eds. (2018). The Edinburgh Companion to Animal Studies. Edinburgh University Press.
- Broglio, Ron (2022). Animal Revolution. University of Minnesota Press.
