= Huffman, Indiana =

- Unincorporated community
- Location within Indiana Location within the United States
- Coordinates: 38°06′07″N 86°46′37″W
- Country: United States
- State: Indiana
- County: Spencer
- Township: Harrison
- Elevation: 430 ft (130 m)
- Time zone: UTC-6 (Central (CST))
  - Summer (DST): UTC-5 (CDT)
- ZIP code: 47635
- Area codes: 812, 930
- GNIS feature ID: 436582

Huffman is an unincorporated community in Harrison Township, Spencer County, in the U.S. state of Indiana.

== History ==
An old variant name of the community was Huffmans Mills. The town's proprietor, John R. Huffman operated a gristmill and sawmill and kept a store. A post office was established at Huffman in 1882, and remained in operation until it was discontinued in 1935.

== Geography ==
Huffman is located at 38°06′07″N 86°46′37″W.
