= Daniel M. Buechlein =

Roman Catholic archbishop in the United States

His Excellency, The Most Reverend Daniel Mark Buechlein OSB
- Archbishop of Indianapolis
- Church: Roman Catholic Church
- See: Indianapolis
- Appointed: July 14, 1992
- Installed: September 9, 1992
- Term ended: September 21, 2011
- Predecessor: Edward O'Meara
- Successor: Joseph William Tobin, C.Ss.R.
- Previous post: Bishop of Memphis (1987–1992)

Orders
- Ordination: May 3, 1964
- Consecration: March 2, 1987 by Thomas Cajetan Kelly, OP, James Stafford, and Edward O'Meara

Personal details
- Born: April 20, 1938 Jasper, Indiana, U.S.
- Died: January 25, 2018 (aged 79) Saint Meinrad, Indiana, U.S.
- Motto: Seek the Face of the Lord

Styles of Daniel Mark Buechlein
- Reference style: His Excellency; The Most Reverend
- Spoken style: Your Excellency
- Religious style: Archbishop

Daniel Mark Buechlein, OSB (April 20, 1938 – January 25, 2018) was a Benedictine monk and an American prelate of the Roman Catholic Church. He served as the third bishop of the Diocese of Memphis in Tennessee from 1987 until he was appointed the fifth archbishop of the Archdiocese of Indianapolis in Indiana from July 14, 1992. Pope Benedict XVI accepted his early resignation because of health problems on September 21, 2011. He died in 2018.

== Biography ==
=== Early life ===
Daniel Buechlein was born on April 20, 1938, in Jasper, Indiana, to Carl and Rose (née Blessinger) Buechlein, and made his solemn profession as a Benedictine monk on August 15, 1963.

Buechlein was ordained to the priesthood on May 3, 1964, at St. Meinrad Archabbey in Indiana. After his ordination, he spent two years studying in Rome. Returning to Indiana, he became a teacher at the Saint Meinrad School of Theology. In August 1971, he was named president-rector of the Saint Meinrad School of Theology. Buechlein was appointed president-rector of Saint Meinrad College in 1982.

=== Bishop of Memphis ===
On January 20, 1987, Pope John Paul II appointed Buechlein as the third bishop of Memphis. He received his episcopal consecration on March 2, 1987, from Archbishop Thomas Kelly, with Archbishops James Stafford and Edward O'Meara serving as co-consecrators.

=== Archbishop of Indianapolis ===
Pope John Paul II appointed Buechlein as the fifth archbishop of Indianapolis on July 14, 1992; he was installed by Archbishop Agostino Cacciavillan on September 9, 1992. In 1995, Buechlein was appointed co-moderator of the Disciples of Christ-Roman Catholic International Dialogue and as a consultor to the Congregation for the Clergy in the Roman Curia in 2003. Buechlein wrote a weekly column entitled Seeking the Face of the Lord for the official archdiocesan newspaper.

In 2001, Buechlein spoke out against the upcoming execution of Timothy J. McVeigh, a domestic terrorist who murdered 168 people in the 1995 bombing of the Alfred P. Murrah Federal Building in Oklahoma City. Buechlein said that capital punishment only served to feed the cycle of violence.

In the US Conference of Catholic Bishops (USCCB), Buechlein served as chair of the Ad Hoc Committee to Oversee the Use of the Catechism. He worked closely with the publishers of Catholic textbooks to incorporate correct teaching of the Catholic catechism. In 2004, Buechlein established the Bishop Simon Bruté College Seminary on the campus of Marian University in Indianapolis. Buechlein Dining Hall is named after him.

On January 18, 2008, Buechlein was diagnosed with Hodgkin's lymphoma, having experienced heavy fatigue and a swelling under his right arm and then undergoing medical tests on the previous January 13. He had expected that although his ministry would be slightly curtailed that the archdiocese will continue to operate as usual. On June 20, 2008, Buechlein announced that his cancer was in remission and his regular routine would resume in August. In 2009, he had a shoulder replacement and in 2010, he had surgery to remove a benign tumor from his stomach. In March 2011, Buechlein suffered a small stroke and was admitted to St. Vincent Hospital in Indianapolis.

=== Retirement and legacy ===
On September 21, 2011, Pope Benedict XVI accepted Buechlein's resignation as archbishop of Indianapolis for health reasons. Buechlein announced his plan to retire to St. Meinrad Archabbey. In October 2012, Pope Benedict XVI named Archbishop Joseph Tobin as his successor; he was installed on December 3, 2012.

Daniel M. Buechlein died on January 25, 2018, at the St. Meinrad Archabbey infirmary at age 79.

Catholic Church titles
Preceded by Edward O'Meara	Archbishop of Indianapolis; 1992–2011	Succeeded by Joseph William Tobin
Preceded by James Stafford	Bishop of Memphis; 1987–1992	Succeeded by J. Terry Steib, SVD
