= Edward O'Meara =

Roman Catholic archbishop in the US

The Most Reverend Edward O'Meara
- Archbishop of Indianapolis
- Church: Roman Catholic
- Archdiocese: Indianapolis
- Appointed: November 27, 1979
- Predecessor: George Biskup
- Successor: Daniel M. Buechlein

Orders
- Ordination: December 21, 1941 by Joseph Ritter
- Consecration: February 13, 1971 by Pope Paul VI

Personal details
- Born: August 3, 1921 St. Louis, Missouri
- Died: January 10, 1992 (aged 70) Indianapolis, Indiana

Styles of Edward O'Meara
- Reference style: The Most Reverend
- Spoken style: Your Excellency
- Religious style: Bishop
- Posthumous style: none

Edward Thomas O'Meara (August 3, 1921 – January 10, 1992) was an American prelate of the Roman Catholic Church. He served as archbishop of the Archdiocese of Indianapolis in Indiana from 1980 until 1992. He previously served as an auxiliary bishop of the Archdiocese of St. Louis in Missouri from 1972 to 1980.

== Biography ==
The son of Irish immigrants, Edward O'Meara was born on August 3, 1921, in St. Louis, Missouri. He attended Kenrick Seminary in St. Louis before being ordained a priest for the Archdiocese of St. Louis by Archbishop Joseph Ritter on December 21, 1946. He then furthered his studies in Rome, where he earned a Doctor of Theology degree from the Pontifical University of St. Thomas Acquinas in 1952. He became national director of the Society for the Propagation of the Faith on December 28, 1966.

On January 28, 1972, O'Meara was appointed as an auxiliary bishop of the Archdiocese of St. Louis and titular bishop of Thisiduo by Pope Paul VI. He received his episcopal consecration on February 13, 1971, from Paul VI himself in St. Peter's Basilica, with Cardinals Bernard Alfrink and William Conway serving as co-consecrators.

On November 27, 1979, O'Meara was appointed the fourth archbishop of the Archdiocese of Indianapolis by Pope John Paul II, succeeding Archbishop George Biskup. He was installed on January 10, 1980.

O'Meara served as chair of Catholic Relief Services from 1987 to 1991, when he was diagnosed with pulmonary fibrosis.

O'Meara died in Indianapolis at age 70 on January 10, 1992, at his residence in Indianapolis. He is buried in Calvary Chapel Mausoleum in Indianapolis. The Archbishop Edward T. O'Meara Catholic Center in Indianapolis was named after O'Meara.

Catholic Church titles
Preceded by George Biskup	Archbishop of Indianapolis; 1980–1992	Succeeded by Daniel M. Buechlein
Preceded by –	Auxiliary Bishop of St. Louis; 1972–1980	Succeeded by –
