= St. Boniface Catholic Church (Fulda, Indiana) =

Historic church in Indiana, United States

- St. Boniface Church
- U.S. National Register of Historic Places
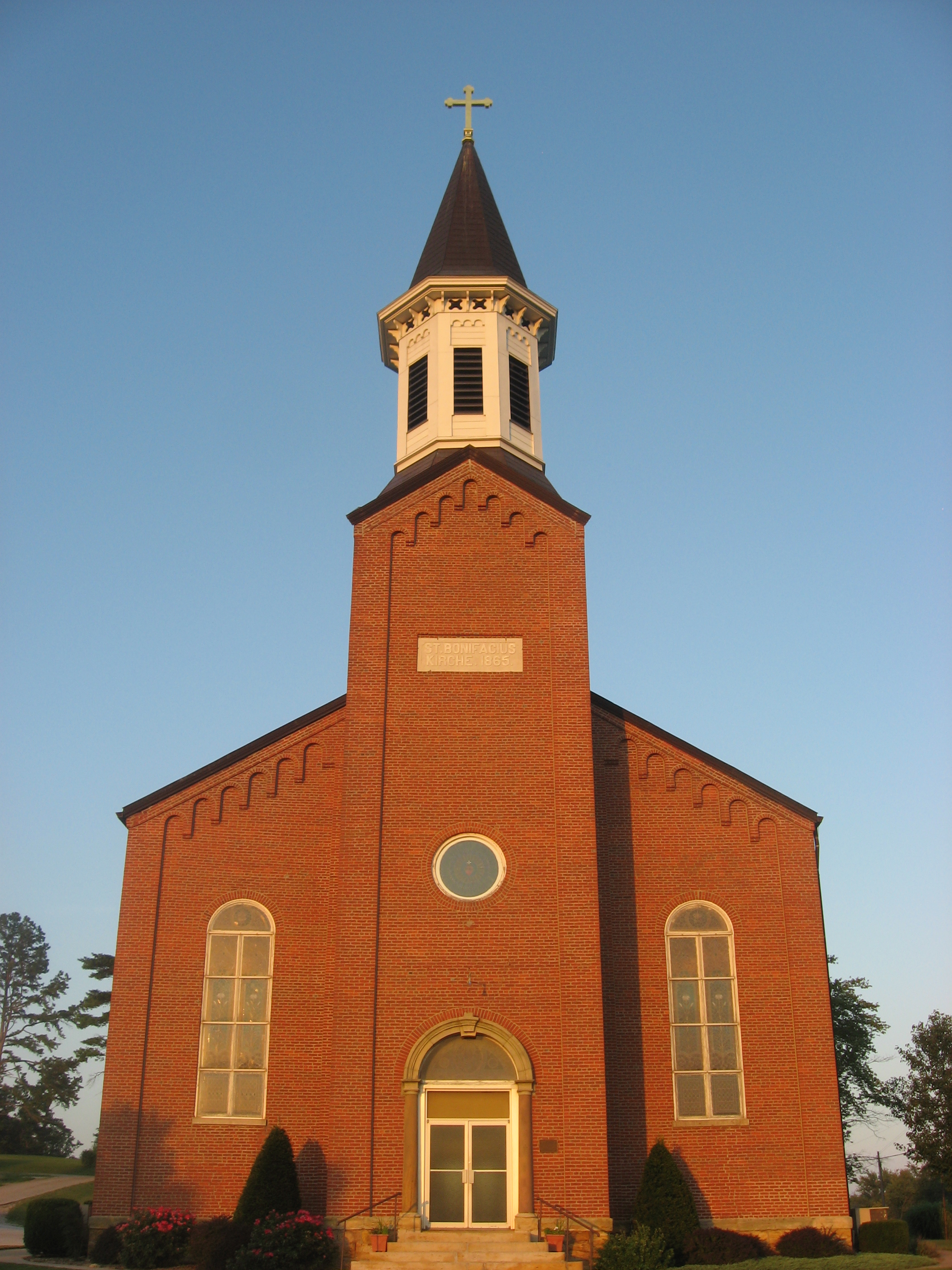
- St. Boniface Catholic Church, July 2011

- Location within Indiana Location within the United States
- Location: IN 545 at Fulda, Indiana
- Coordinates: 38°6′41″N 86°50′8″W
- Area: less than one acre
- Built: 1865
- Built by: Reidinger
- Architectural style: Romanesque, Romanesque Revival
- NRHP reference No.: 80000065
- Added to NRHP: October 23, 1980

St. Boniface Catholic Church is a historic Roman Catholic church at Fulda, Indiana. Built from 1861 to 1865, it is a one-story, Romanesque Revival style brick church with a semi-circular apse, on a sandstone block foundation, and measures 55 x 139 feet (18 x 42 meters). It has a 150 foot tall entrance tower with spire.

The church was listed on the National Register of Historic Places in 1980.
