= Thomas C. Kelly =

American prelate

His Excellency, The Most Reverend Thomas C. Kelly OP
- Archbishop of Louisville
- See: Louisville
- Appointed: December 28, 1981
- Installed: February 18, 1982
- Predecessor: Thomas Joseph McDonough
- Successor: Joseph Edward Kurtz
- Previous post: Auxiliary Bishop of Washington (1977 – 1981)

Orders
- Ordination: June 5, 1958
- Consecration: August 15, 1977 by Joseph Bernardin

Personal details
- Born: July 14, 1931 Rochester, New York, US
- Died: December 14, 2011 (aged 80) Louisville, Kentucky, US

Styles of Thomas Kelly
- Reference style: The Most Reverend
- Spoken style: Your Excellency
- Religious style: Archbishop
- Posthumous style: none

Thomas Cajetan Kelly OP (July 14, 1931 – December 14, 2011) was an American prelate of the Roman Catholic Church. A member of the Dominican Order, Kelley served as archbishop of the Archdiocese of Louisville in Kentucky from 1982 until his retirement in 2007. He previously served as an auxiliary bishop of the Archdiocese of Washington from 1977 to 1981.

== Biography ==
=== Early life ===
Thomas Kelly was born on July 14, 1931, in Rochester, New York, the son of Thomas E. Kelly and Katherine Fisher. When Kelly was a child, the family moved to New York City. He attended Joan of Arc School in Jackson Heights in Queens and then Regis High School in Manhattan. Kelly studied for two years at Providence College in Providence, Rhode Island. He then attended St. Rose Priory in Springfield, Kentucky, and St. Joseph Priory in Somerset, Ohio. Kelly then entered the Dominican House of Studies in Washington, D.C. He was admitted to the Dominican Order on August 25, 1951.

=== Priesthood ===
Kelly was ordained to the priesthood for the Dominicans at St. Dominic Church in Washington, D.C., on June 5, 1958. He earned a Licentiate of Sacred Theology from the Dominican House of Studies in Washington, D.C., in 1959 and a Doctor of Canon Law degree from the Pontifical University of St. Thomas Aquinas in Rome in 1962. He would later study at the University of Vienna in Austria and at Cambridge University in the United Kingdom.

In 1962, Kelly was appointed as secretary of the Dominican Province of St. Joseph, headquartered in New York City. During his time in New York, he also worked for the tribunal of the Archdiocese of New York and the Legion of Decency. In 1965, Kelly was appointed the secretary and archivist for the Apostolic Nunciature to the United States in Washington, D.C. After serving at the nunciature for seven years, he was appointed associate general secretary of the U.S. Conference of Catholic Bishops (USCCB) in 1972. He was elected to a five-year term as general secretary of the USCCB in March 1977.

=== Auxiliary Bishop of Washington ===
In July 1977, Pope Paul VI named Kelly an auxiliary bishop of Washington and titular bishop of Tusuro. He was consecrated on August 15, 1977, by Archbishop Joseph Bernardin at the Basilica of the National Shrine of the Immaculate Conception in Washington.

=== Archbishop of Louisville ===
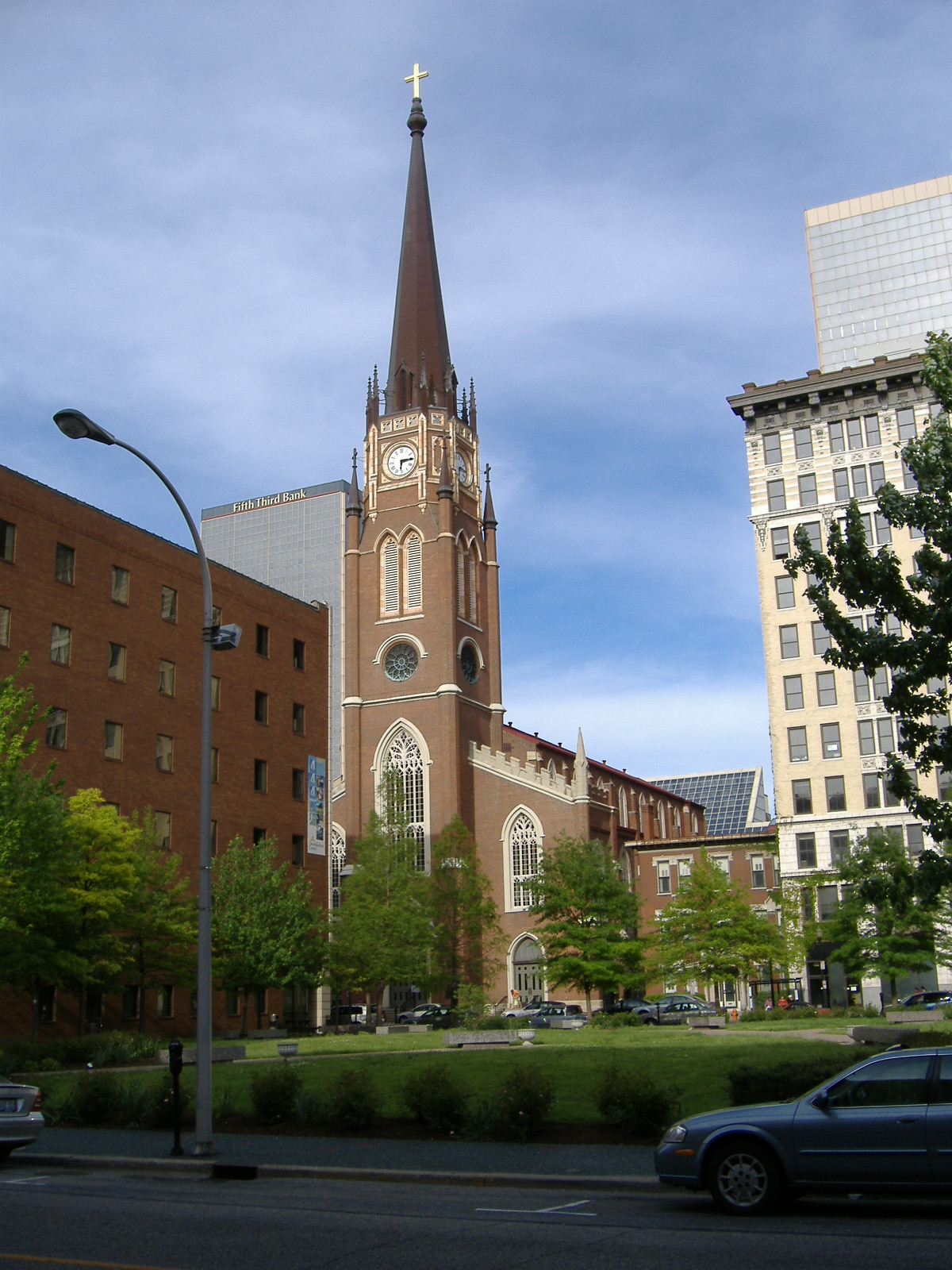
Cathedral of the Assumption, Louisville, Kentucky (2007)

On December 21, 1981, Pope John Paul II appointed Kelly as archbishop of Louisville. He was installed in Louisville, Kentucky, on February 18, 1982.

Kelly led the restoration of the Cathedral of the Assumption in Louisville, pushed for interfaith dialogue, and worked for increased lay person leadership in the archdiocese. He started a Campaign for Excellence program that reversed the enrollment decline at Catholic schools in the archdiocese. Kelly admitted to developing an opioid addiction while recovering from surgery for lung cancer, only recognizing the problem after being confronted by his doctors.

In the wake of the uncovering of widespread sexual abuse in the Archdiocese of Louisville in 2002, it was revealed that Kelly played a part in reassigning priests he knew or suspected had abused children and reaching confidential settlements with victims. Kelly resisted calls for him to resign.

=== Retirement and death ===
Pope Benedict XVI accepted Kelly's resignation as archbishop of Louisville on June 7, 2007. Kelly died at the age of 80 on December 14, 2011, at Holy Trinity Parish, his home since retirement, in Louisville, Kentucky.

=== Honors ===
Kelly received the following honorary doctoral degrees:

- Human Letters, Spalding University, Louisville
- Humane Letters, Albertus Magnus College, New Haven, Connecticut
- Human Sciences, Caldwell College, Caldwell, New Jersey
- Laws, Assumption College, Worcester, Massachusetts
- Sacred Theology, Dominican School of Philosophy and Theology, Berkeley, California
- Sacred Theology, Providence College
- Theology, Aquinas Institute of Theology, St. Louis, Missouri

Catholic Church titles
Preceded by Thomas Joseph McDonough	Archbishop of Louisville; 1981–2007	Succeeded by Joseph Edward Kurtz
