= WSPM =

- Cloverdale, Indiana; United States
- Frequency: 89.1 MHz
- Branding: Catholic Radio Indy

Programming
- Format: Catholic
- Affiliations: EWTN Radio

Ownership
- Owner: Inter Mirifica, Inc.
- Sister stations: WSQM

Technical information
- Licensing authority: FCC
- Facility ID: 93486
- Class: B
- ERP: 22,500 watts
- HAAT: 129 metres (423 ft)
- Transmitter coordinates: 39°41′19″N 86°42′3″W
- Translator: (98.3 MHz) W252CY (Anderson) (rebroadcasts WSQM)

Links
- Public license information: Public file; LMS
- Webcast: Listen Live
- Website: Official Website

WSPM (89.1 FM) is a radio station licensed to serve the community of Cloverdale, Indiana. The station is owned by Inter Mirifica, Inc., and airs a Catholic radio format.

The station was assigned the WSPM call letters by the Federal Communications Commission on September 27, 2002.
