= Archdiocese of Indianapolis =

Latin Catholic jurisdiction in the US

Coordinates: 39.7853°N 86.1570°W

Archdiocese of Indianapolis Archidioecesis Indianapolitana
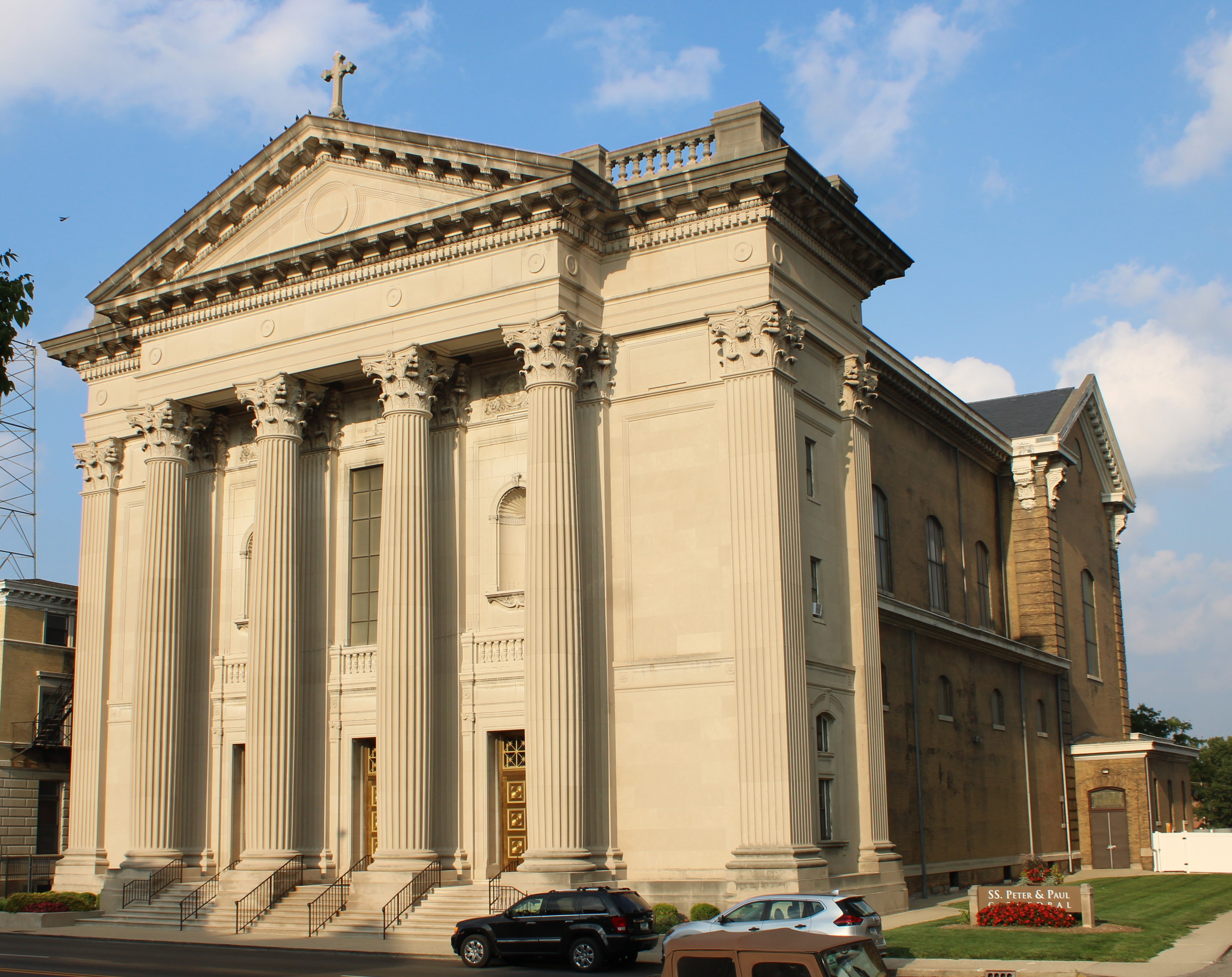
- Saints Peter and Paul Cathedral

- Coat of arms

Location
- Country: United States
- Territory: Central Indiana
- Ecclesiastical province: Indianapolis

Statistics
- Area: 13,815 sq mi (35,780 km^{2})
- Population: Total; Catholics: (as of 2010); 2,573,000; 244,000 (9.5%)
- Parishes: 133

Information
- Denomination: Catholic Church
- Sui iuris church: Latin Church
- Rite: Roman Rite
- Established: May 6, 1834 (192 years ago)
- Cathedral: Saints Peter and Paul Cathedral, Indianapolis
- Patron saint: Francis Xavier; Théodore Guérin

Current leadership
- Pope: Leo XIV
- Archbishop: Charles Thompson
- Vicar General: Rev. Msgr. William F. Stumpf, PhD
- Judicial Vicar: Very Rev. Joseph L. Newton, JCL, VJ

Map
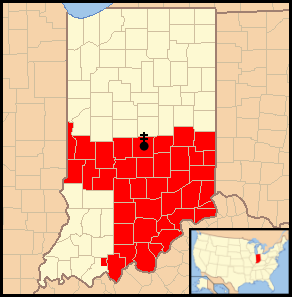

Website
- archindy.org

The Archdiocese of Indianapolis (Latin: Archidioecesis Indianapolitana) is a diocese of the Catholic Church in Indiana in the United States. Erected as the Diocese of Vincennes in 1834, it was renamed the Diocese of Indianapolis in 1898. It was elevated to a metropolitan archdiocese in 1944. Charles Thompson is the archbishop.

== Bishops ==
=== Bishops of Vincennes ===
1. Simon Bruté de Rémur (1834–1839)
2. Célestine Guynemer de la Hailandière (1839–1847)
3. John Stephen Bazin (1847–1848)
4. Jacques-Maurice De Saint Palais (1848–1877)

=== Bishops of Indianapolis ===
1. Francis Silas Chatard (1878–1918)
2. Joseph Chartrand (1918–1933; coadjutor bishop 1910–1918)
3. Joseph Ritter (1934–1944), elevated to archbishop

(John T. McNicholas was appointed in 1925; did not take effect.)

=== Archbishops of Indianapolis ===
1. Joseph Ritter (1944–1946), appointed Archbishop of Saint Louis (cardinal in 1961)
2. Paul C. Schulte (1946–1970)
3. George Biskup (1970–1979; coadjutor archbishop 1967–1970)
4. Edward T. O'Meara (1979–1992)
5. Daniel M. Buechlein (1992–2011)
6. Cardinal Joseph William Tobin (2012–2017), appointed Archbishop of Newark while he was Cardinal-designate
7. Charles C. Thompson (2017–present)

=== Auxiliary bishops ===
- Denis O'Donaghue (1900–1910), appointed Bishop of Louisville
- Joseph Ritter (1933–1934), appointed Bishop and later Archbishop of Indianapolis (see above); future cardinal
- Christopher J. Coyne (2011–2015), appointed Bishop of Burlington

=== Other diocesan priests who became bishops ===
- Herman Joseph Alerding, appointed Bishop of Fort Wayne in 1900
- Emmanuel Boleslaus Ledvina, appointed Bishop of Corpus Christi in 1921
- Alphonse John Smith, appointed Bishop of Nashville in 1923
- Gerald Andrew Gettelfinger, appointed Bishop of Evansville in 1989
- Paul Etienne, appointed Bishop of Cheyenne in 2009, Archbishop of Anchorage in 2016, Coadjutor Archbishop of Seattle in 2019 and subsequently succeeded to latter see

== History ==
Before the Archdiocese of Indianapolis was erected in 1944, the episcopal see passed through several other ecclesiastical jurisdictions:

- Diocese of Quebec from 1700 to 1789
- Diocese of Baltimore from 1789 to 1808
- Diocese of Bardstown from 1808 to 1834
- Diocese of Vincennes from 1834 to 1898
- Diocese of Indianapolis from 1898 to 1944

=== Early mission (1675–1834) ===
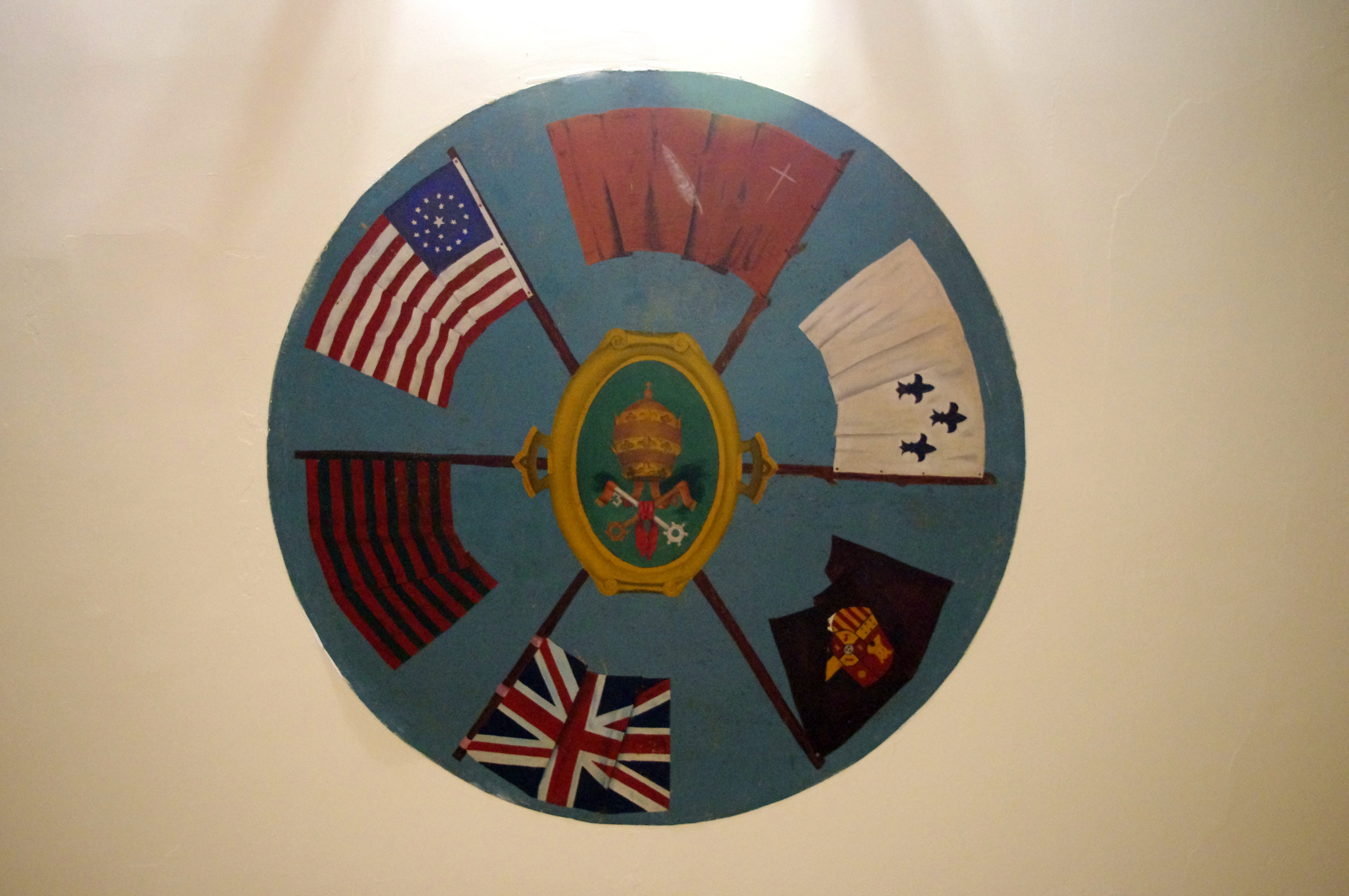
Fresco in the St. Francis Xavier Basilica undercroft shows the flags (clockwise from top) of the Miami Nation of Indiana, French, Spanish, British, George Rogers Clark Flag and United States

The origins of the Catholic mission churches in the area that is now Indiana date to the late seventeenth century, when the Catholic parishes in the area were under the authority of the Diocese of Quebec. French Jesuit missionaries first arrived in the region of present-day Vincennes, around 1675. The first Catholic church at Vincennes was established around 1732 as Saint Francis Xavier. Sebastian Louis Meurin, the first resident priest, arrived in May 1748. The parish's earliest records date from April 21, 1749.

Following Meurin's departure from Vincennes in 1753, several itinerant priests visited the Catholic parish, including Pierre Gibault, who served as resident priest at Saint Francis Xavier from 1785 to 1789. In these early years, the Catholic communities in the area experienced hardships during the American Revolution, conflicts with Native Americans, and suffered from epidemics that swept through the frontier. They also lacked financial resources and sufficient priests.

In 1832, Joseph Rosati, the first bishop of the Diocese of Saint Louis, petitioned the Vatican to name Simon Bruté de Rémur as the first bishop of a new diocese in the State of Indiana.

=== Diocese of Vincennes (1834–1898) ===
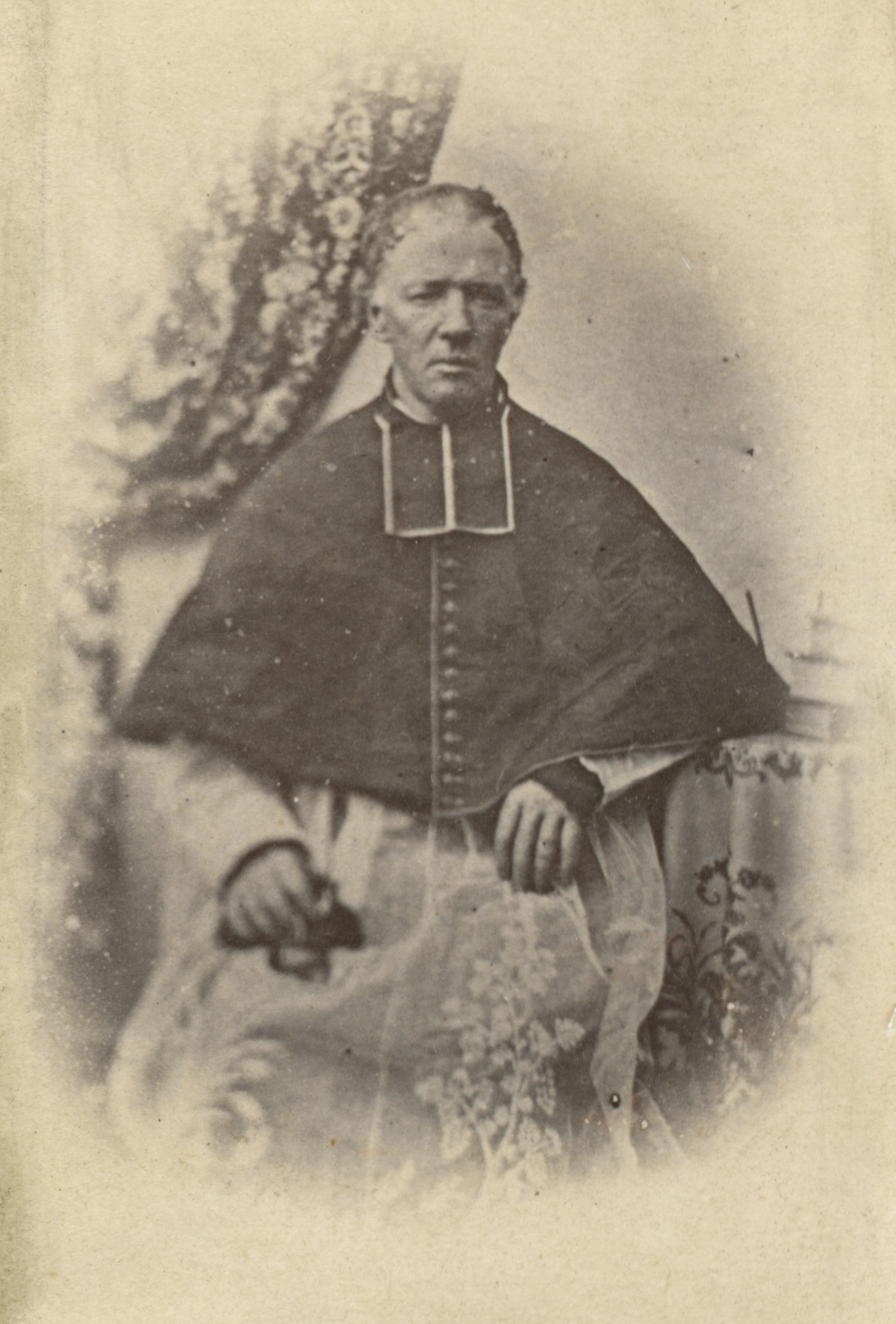
Bishop Bazin (pre-1848)

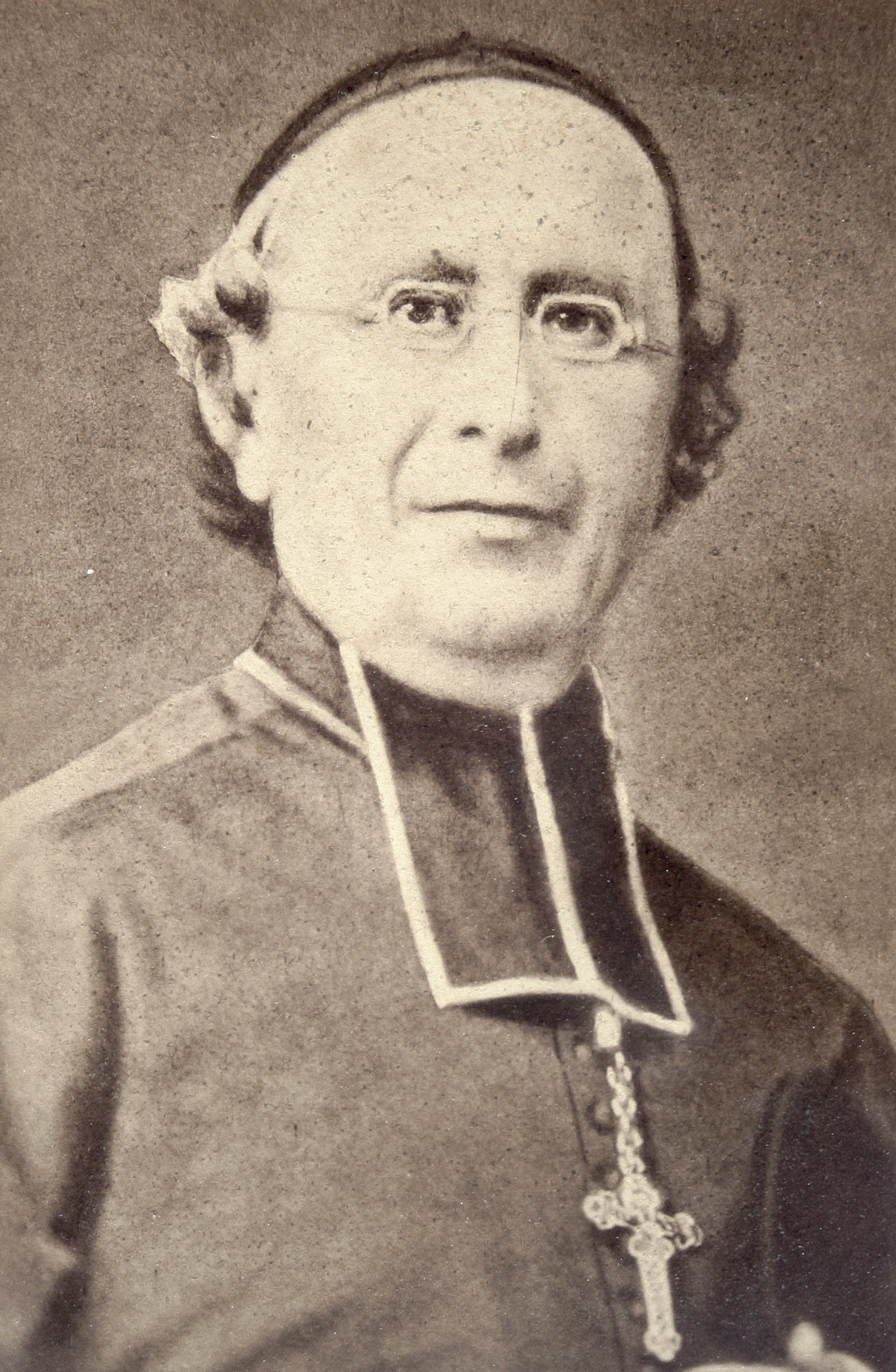
Bishop de la Hailandiere (pre-1882)

=== 1834 to 1847 ===
On May 6, 1834, Pope Gregory XVI issued a papal bull to erect the Diocese of Vincennes, the first episcopal see in Indiana. Bruté was consecrated as the first bishop of Vincennes on October 28, 1834, in St Louis. At the time of his installation, the new diocese, which covered all of Indiana and the eastern third of Illinois, had only three priests.

Bruté made it a point to visit each Catholic family in the new diocese, regardless of the distance from his rectory at Vincennes. In 1837, he founded a college at Vincennes, and connected it to a local theological seminary established under the Eudists. Bruté became ill while attending a provincial council in Baltimore. The illness weakened Bruté's immune system, but he continued his duties until his death at Vincennes on June 26, 1839.

Célestine Guynemer de la Hailandière, Bruté's vicar general, was consecrated as bishop of Vincennes on August 18, 1839. De la Hailandière completed Saint Francis Xavier Cathedral, which he consecrated on August 8, 1841. He also constructed a library at Vincennes to house Bruté's collection of over 5,000 books and religious documents. Under de la Hailandière, the Sisters of Providence moved into the diocese and the Brothers of the Holy Cross established schools for boys. Edward Sorin, founder of the University of Notre Dame, and Théodore Guérin, founder of Sisters of Providence of Saint Mary-of-the-Woods, also joined de la Hailandière in Indiana. Indiana's population during this period grew slowly and the institutions de la Hailandière helped to establish experienced many problems. In 1843, the Vatican erected the Diocese of Chicago, removing the Illinois counties from the Diocese of Vincennes. De la Hailandiè resigned in 1847.

=== 1847 to 1860 ===
John Bazin, de la Hailandière's successor, was appointed bishop of Vincennes on September 3, 1847. Bazin's consecration took place at Saint Francis Xavier Cathedral on October 24, 1847, making him the first bishop to be ordained in Indiana. Bazin appointed Jacques-Maurice De Saint Palais, his vicar general, as the diocesan administrator. Bazin died at Vincennes on April 23, 1848, having served the diocese for six months.

Bazin's successor, de St. Palais, was consecrated as bishop of Vincennes on January 14, 1849, at Vincennes. During his tenure as bishop, de St. Palais had to contend with unresolved monetary issues from Hailandière's episcopacy, a cholera epidemic, and expanding the educational and ministerial opportunities within the diocese. In 1849, Guerin established an orphanage in Vincennes and in 1853 monks from Einsiedeln, Switzerland, founded Saint Meinrad abbey and seminary in southern Indiana; however, plans to open a school for African Americans were never carried out. In 1857, the Vatican erected the Diocese of Fort Wayne, taking its territory from the Diocese of Vincennes.

=== 1860 to 1898 ===
During the American Civil War, de St. Palais had to contend with the call for soldiers, and several priests from the diocese served as military chaplains. In 1864, one priest from the diocese, Ernest Audran, was drafted into the Union Army. De St. Palais did not address the topic of the 1863 Emancipation Proclamation, which freed all enslaved people in the country, because he feared that doing so would venture too far into politics.

Although de St. Palais recognized that Indianapolis had become a major city (the eighth largest in the United States by 1870), he deferred the decision to move the seat of the diocese to his successor, Silas Chatard. At the time of the De St. Palais' death in 1877, the diocese had grown to include 151 churches, 117 priests, and 90,000 parishioners.

Chatard, Indiana's first American-born bishop, was consecrated as bishop of Vincennes in Rome, Italy, on May 12, 1878. Chatard obtained permission from Pope Leo XIII to move the bishop's residence and diocesan chancery to Indianapolis in 1878, but the episcopal see remained at Vincennes. Anticipating the eventual relocation of the episcopal see to Indianapolis, Chatard established Saints Peter and Paul Parish as a new parish on the city's near north side, where he planned to construct a new cathedral. Chatard's tenure as bishop was also marked by his poor health.

=== Diocese of Indianapolis (1898–1944) ===
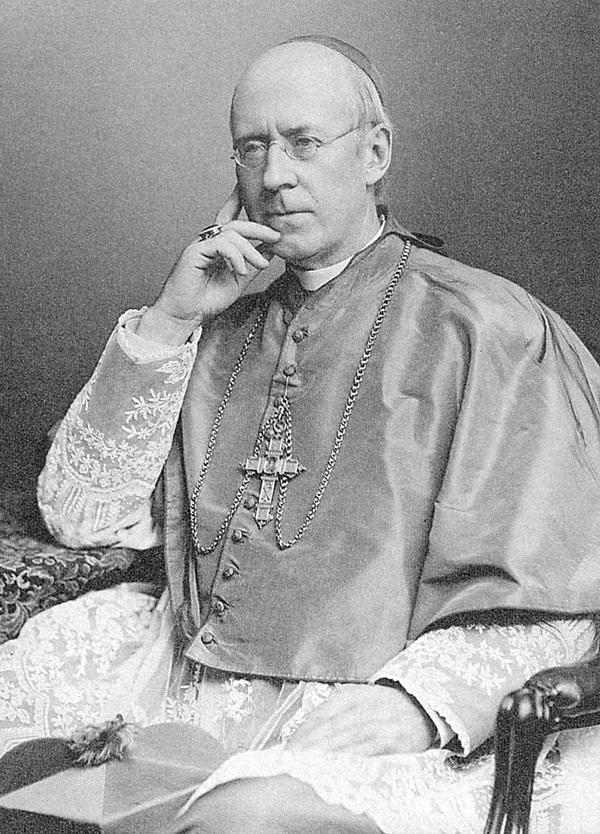
Bishop Chatard (pre-1918)

On March 28, 1898, Pope Leo XIII transferred the episcopal see from Vincennes to Indianapolis; the Diocese of Vincennes was renamed as the Diocese of Indianapolis. Chatard became the first bishop of Indianapolis. Saint John the Evangelist Church in Indianapolis served as the pro-cathedral of the diocese until Saints Peter and Paul Cathedral was completed in 1907. Chatard was paralyzed by a stroke in 1900. On July 27, 1910, Pope Pius named Joseph Chartrand as coadjutor bishop of Indianapolis to assist Chatard. Chatard died on September 7, 1918, at Indianapolis and Chartrand automatically succeeded him as bishop.

Chartrand opened more than 25 elementary and secondary schools in his first 14 years as bishop. Chartrand dealt with threats from the Ku Klux Klan by publishing a list of Klan members in the Indianapolis Times newspaper. During the Great Depression, he exempted the entire diocese from fasting, with the exception of Fridays during Lent. When Chartrand died in 1933, the diocese had 126 parochial schools and 19 secondary schools.

=== 1944 to 1980 ===
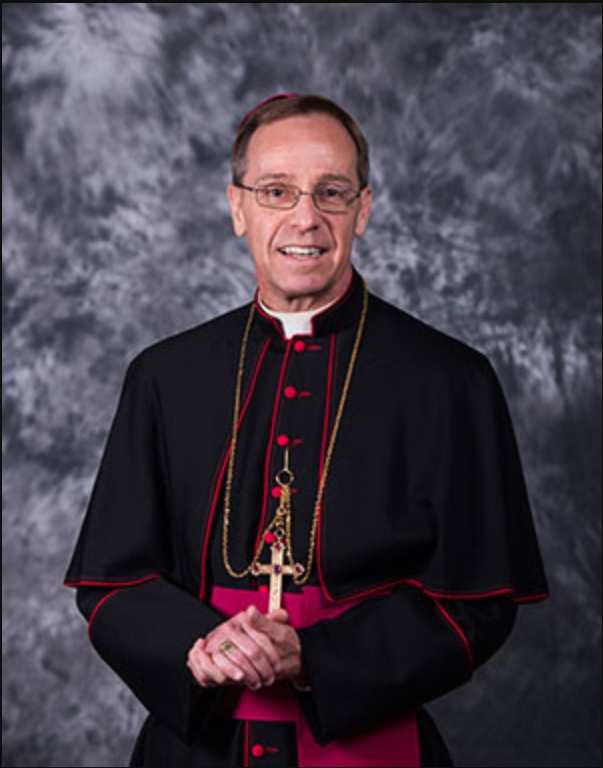
Archbishop Thompson (2021)

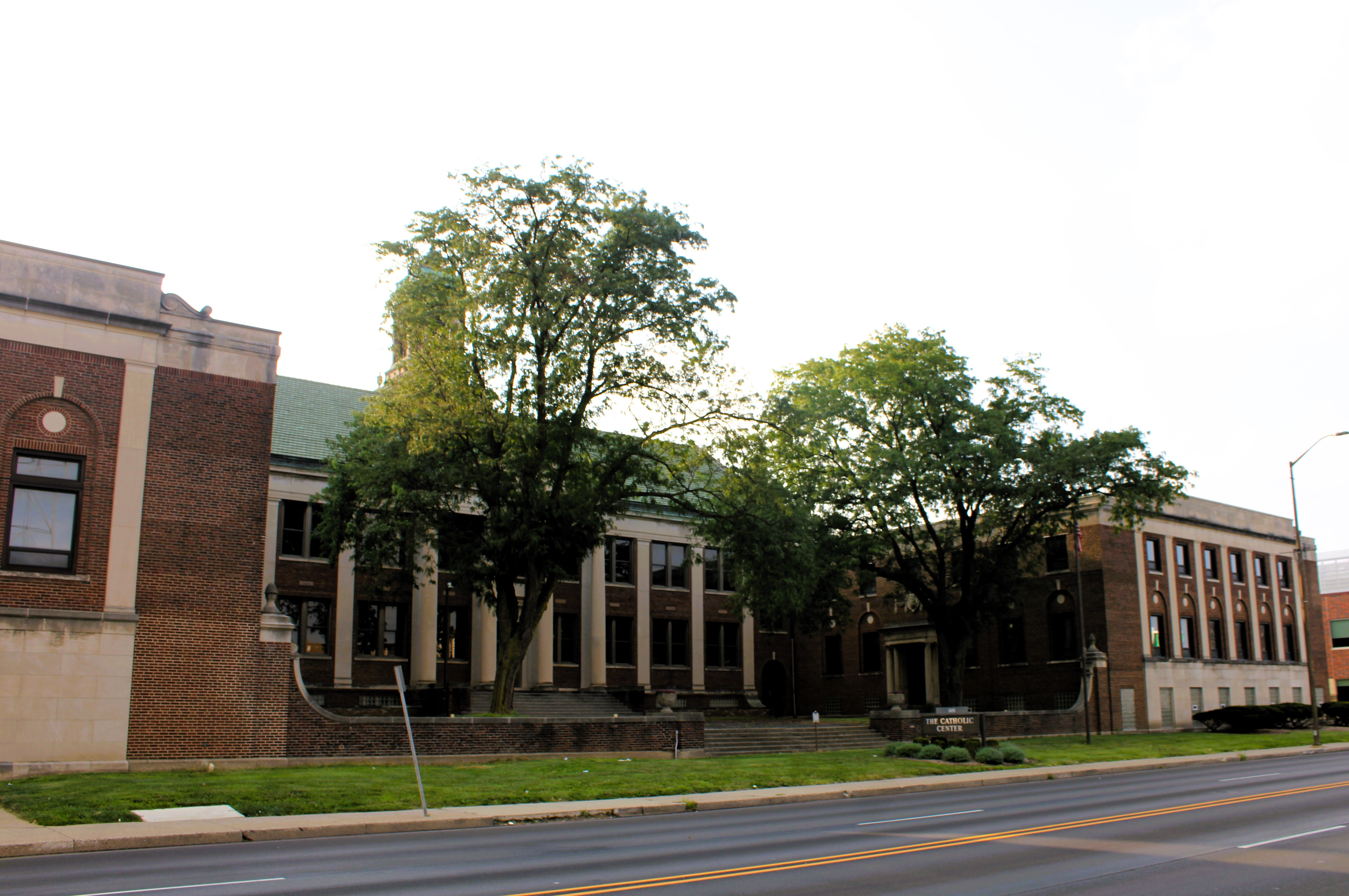
Archbishop Edward T. O'Meara Catholic Center

Joseph Ritter, who had served as auxiliary bishop and vicar general for the Diocese of Indianapolis, succeeded Chartrand as bishop in March 1934. In 1937, Ritter ordered the racial integration of three girls' schools in the diocese, opening enrollment for all female students. In 1942, he integrated the Catholic high school in Evansville.

In October 1944, Pope Pius XII elevated the Diocese of Indianapolis to the Archdiocese of Indianapolis. Ritter was the first archbishop. At the same time, the pope founded the Dioceses of Evansville and Lafayette, taking their territories from the new archdiocese. In 1946, Ritter left Indianapolis to become archbishop of Saint Louis.

Archbishop Paul Schulte led the archdiocese from 1946 until 1970. He supervised construction of three high schools in the Indianapolis area and 17 churches in the archdiocese. On December 17, 1956, the Vatican erected the Diocese of Gary from the territory of the archdiocese. Schulte resigned as archbishop in 1970. Auxiliary Bishop George Biskup from the Archdiocese of Dubuque became archbishop of Indianapolis in 1970. He established the first priests' senate in order to expedite decisions and encourage communications between the archbishop and his priests.

=== 1980 to 2000 ===
Auxiliary Bishop Edward T. O'Meara of Saint Louis, installed as archbishop of Indianapolis in 1980, reorganized the archdiocesan offices and consolidated them into one location at the Catholic Center. O'Meara opposed abortion rights for women and supported the needs of the poor. The archdiocese celebrated its 150th anniversary in 1984.

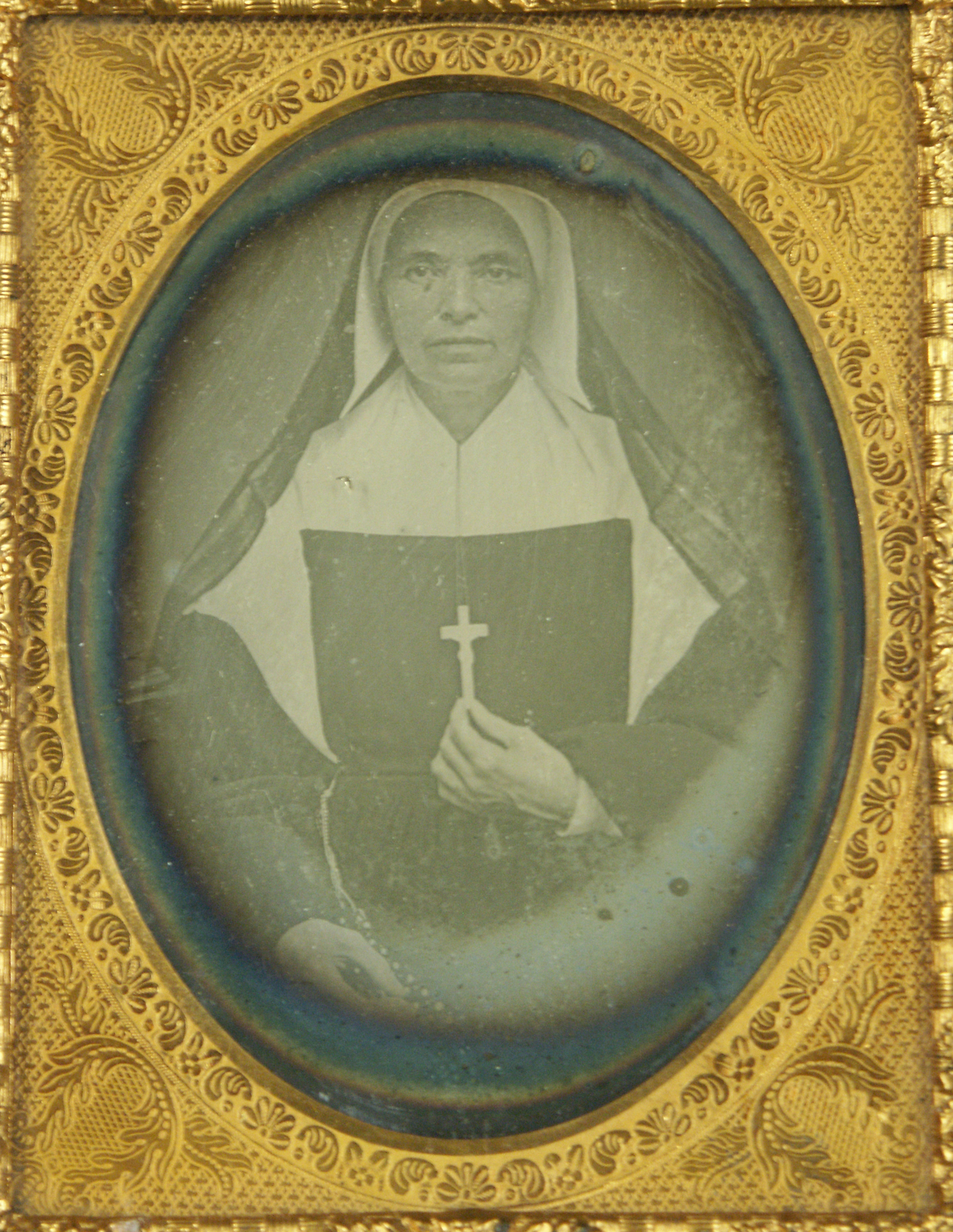
Superior General Théodora Guérin

O'Meara's successor, Bishop Daniel M. Buechlein from the Diocese of Memphis, became archbishop of Indianapolis in 1992. Because of his support for Catholic education, the media designated Buechlein as the "education bishop."

=== 2000 to present ===
Pope Benedict XVI appointed Christopher J. Coyne as auxiliary bishop in Indianapolis to assist Buechlein in March 2011. On September 21, 2011, the Vatican granted Buechlein an early retirement at age 73 due to ill health. Coyne served as apostolic administrator until October 2012, when Bishop Joseph Tobin, secretary of the Congregation for Institutes of Consecrated Life and Societies of Apostolic Life in Rome, was appointed archbishop. In May 2016, Tobin was named to oversee the Sodalitium Christianae Vitae in Lima, Peru.

Bishop Charles C. Thompson of Evansville Diocese was installed as archbishop of Indianapolis on July 28, 2017.

A Catholic high school teacher in a same-sex marriage was fired and afterward sued the archdiocese in July 2019 for discrimination and interfering with his teaching contract. The two parties reached a settlement in which the school was to help the teacher with future employment opportunities. Meanwhile, the archdiocese said in July 2019 that Brebeuf Jesuit Preparatory School in Indianapolis was no longer recognized as a Catholic institution due to its refusal to fire a teacher in a same-sex marriage. As of 2023, Thompson is the current archbishop of Indianapolis.

=== Sex abuse ===
In October 2018, the archdiocese published a list of 24 priests with credible accusations of sexual abuse of minors. The archdiocese added four more names to the list in 2022.

David Marcotte pleaded guilty in March 2022 to felony dissemination of matter harmful to minors. In 2016, Marcotte was using social media to send pornographic materials to minors and to recruit them to engage in sexual conversations. The archdiocese suspended him from ministry in February 2019 after receiving a report about his activities. Marcotte was sentenced to one year of home detention and 18 months of probation. Lloyds of London sued the archdiocese in 2020, claiming that the archdiocese did not disclose the Marcotte allegations to Lloyds in June 2019 when it applied for excess sexual misconduct liability insurance.

== Patronage ==
The patron saints of the Archdiocese of Indianapolis are Francis Xavier and Theodora Guerin.

- Xavier was the patron saint of the first cathedral of the diocese, and therefore also of the diocese.
- Guerin was the first saint canonized from the archdiocese and was recognized as patroness of the archdiocese in 2006.

== Education ==
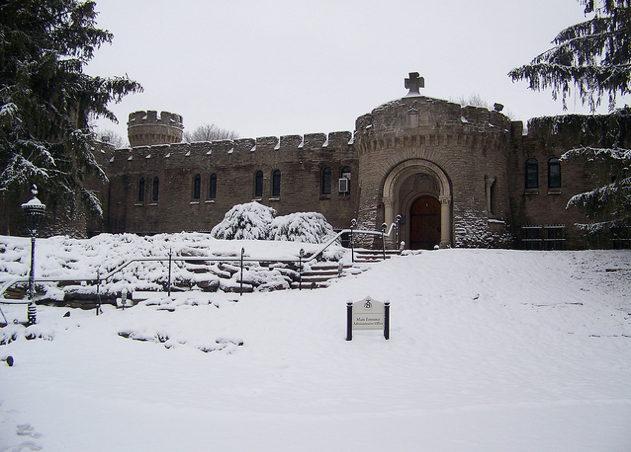
Bishop Simon Bruté College Seminary, Indianapolis, Indiana (2011)

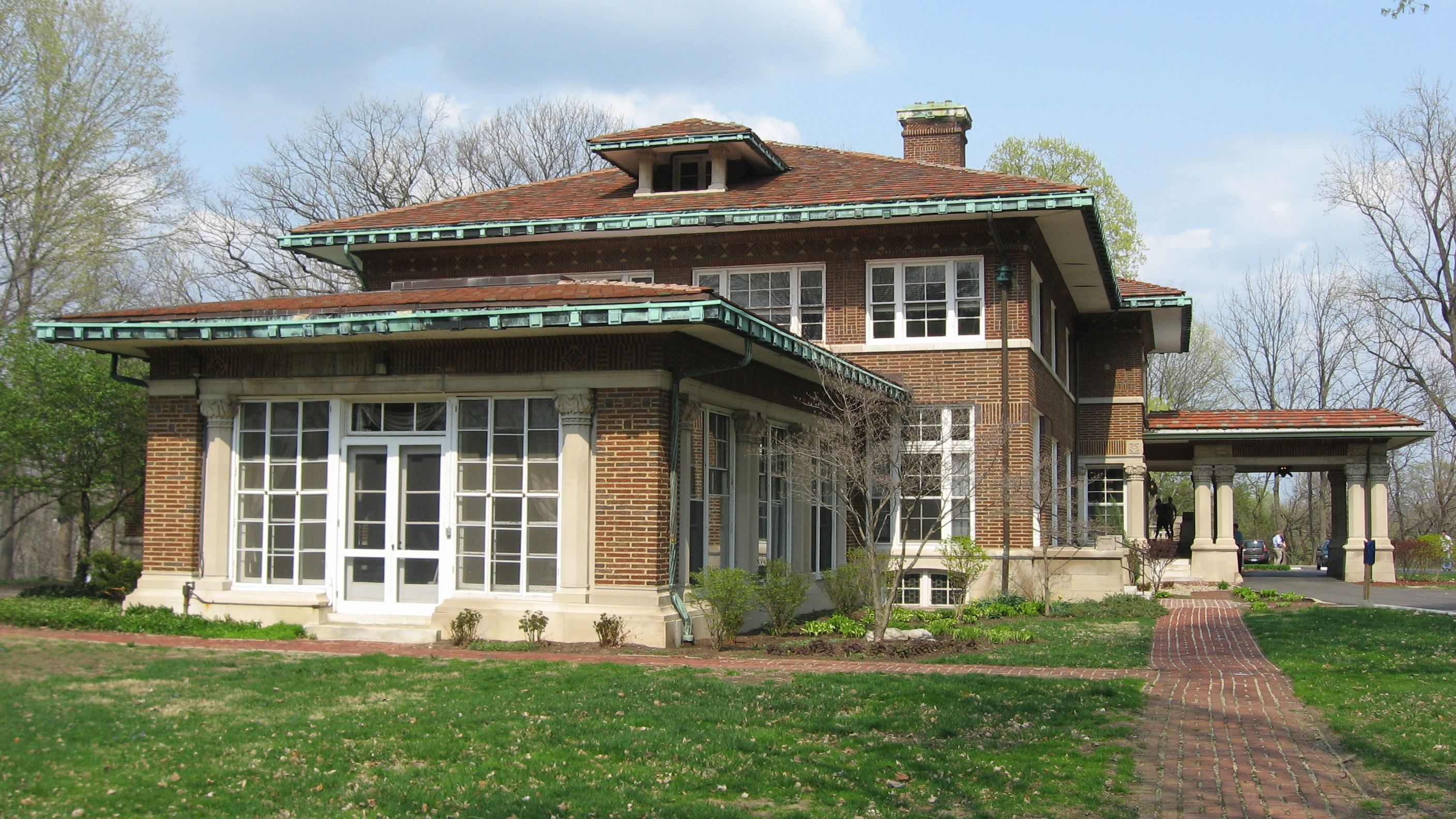
Marian University, Indianapolis, Indiana (2011)

The Archdiocese of Indianapolis has two colleges, two seminaries, seven high schools, and 60 elementary schools. As of 2008, the system had approximately 24,000 students. The archdiocese established the Cristo Rey Project with the Sisters of Providence to assist low income students in 2006.

=== High schools ===
==== Operated by archdiocese ====
- Bishop Chatard High School – Indianapolis
- Father Michael Shawe Memorial High School – Madison
- Father Thomas Scecina Memorial High School – Indianapolis
- Cardinal Ritter High School – Indianapolis
- Our Lady of Providence Junior-Senior High School – Clarksville
- Roncalli High School – Indianapolis
- Seton Catholic High School – Richmond

==== Operated by religious institutes ====
- Brebeuf Jesuit Preparatory School – Indianapolis
- Cathedral High School – Indianapolis
- Oldenburg Academy of the Immaculate Conception – Oldenburg
- Providence Cristo Rey High School – Indianapolis

=== Colleges ===
- Bishop Simon Bruté College Seminary – Indianapolis
- Marian University – Indianapolis
- Saint Mary-of-the-Woods College – Saint-Mary-of-the-Woods
- Saint Meinrad Seminary – St. Meinrad

=== Archabbey ===
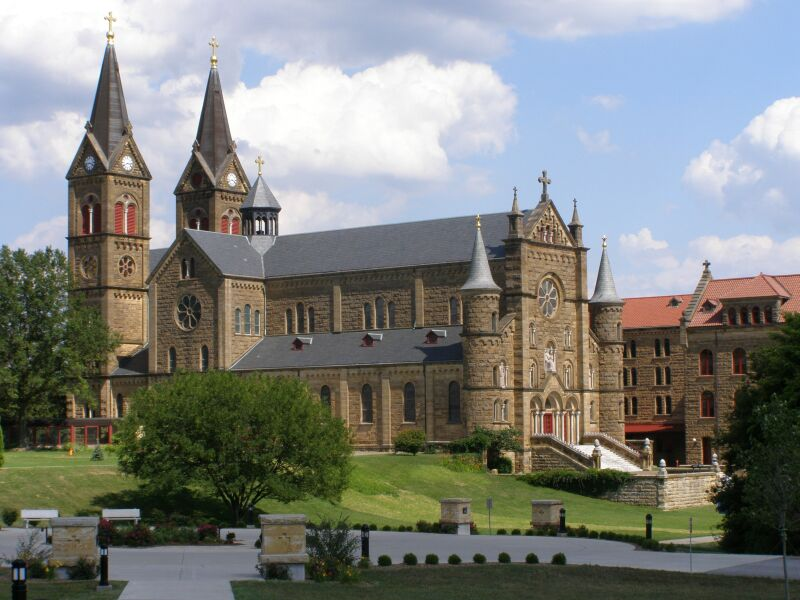
St. Meinrad Archabbey, St. Meinrad, Indiana (2008)

St. Meinrad Archabbey, a Benedictine monastery in St. Meinrad, serves the archdiocese as a seminary and lay graduate school of theology. It was founded in 1854 by monks from the Einsiedeln Abbey in Switzerland to meet the needs of a growing German-speaking Catholic population in Indiana.

== Radio ==
- WSPM 89.1 FM Catholic Radio Indy – licensed to Cloverdale with studios in Indianapolis and a repeater:
- WSQM 90.9 FM – Noblesville

Both stations offer an audio stream from its website. www.catholicradioindy.org. Other stations outside the archdiocese offer online streaming from the websites of:

- WRDF 106.3 FM Redeemer Radio – Fort Wayne
- WNOP 740 AM Sacred Heart Radio – licensed to Newport, Kentucky, and based in Cincinnati.
- WVSG 820 AM St. Gabriel Radio – Columbus, Ohio
- Radio Maria USA – based at KJMJ Alexandria, Louisiana

== Suffragan sees ==
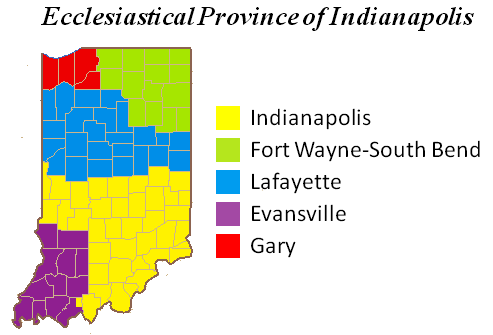
Ecclesiastical Province of Indianapolis

- Diocese of Evansville
- Diocese of Fort Wayne-South Bend
- Diocese of Gary
- Diocese of Lafayette in Indiana
