= Saint Meinrad, Indiana =

- Census-designated place
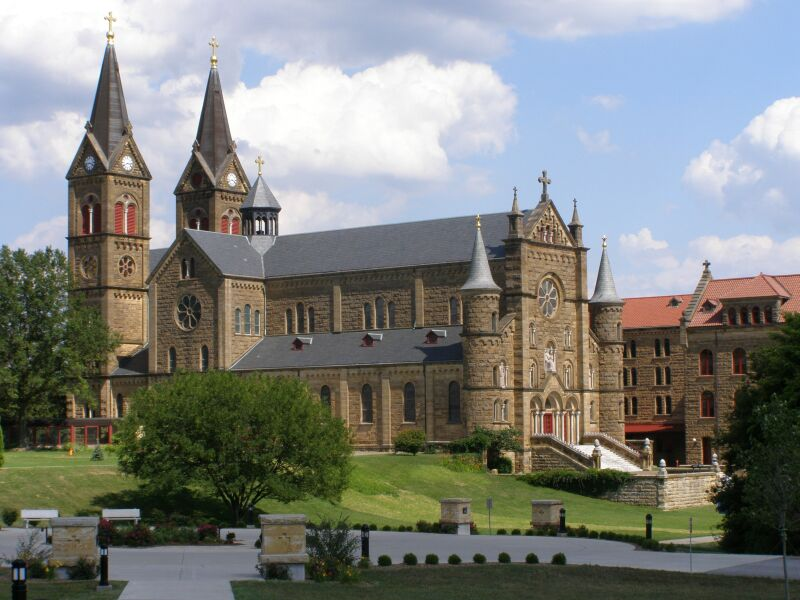
- St Meinrad Archabbey

- Location of St. Meinrad in Spencer County, Indiana
- Coordinates: 38°10′09″N 86°49′33″W
- Country: United States
- State: Indiana
- County: Spencer
- Township: Harrison

Area
  - Total: 1.70 sq mi (4.41 km^{2})
  - Land: 1.68 sq mi (4.36 km^{2})
  - Water: 0.023 sq mi (0.06 km^{2})
- Elevation: 551 ft (168 m)

Population (2020)
  - Total: 664
  - Density: 394.7/sq mi (152.39/km^{2})
- Time zone: UTC-6 (Central (CST))
  - Summer (DST): UTC-5 (CDT)
- ZIP code: 47577
- Area codes: 812, 930
- FIPS code: 18-67176
- GNIS feature ID: 2629884

Saint Meinrad is a census-designated place (CDP) in Harrison Township, Spencer County, Indiana, United States. Located along the Anderson River, it is home to the St. Meinrad Archabbey. Interstate 64 runs near the CDP, and it is situated about 55 miles east of Evansville. Because of the archabbey, St. Meinrad, along with Harrison Township, is assigned to the Archdiocese of Indianapolis. The rest of Spencer County is within the borders of the much closer Diocese of Evansville.

== History ==
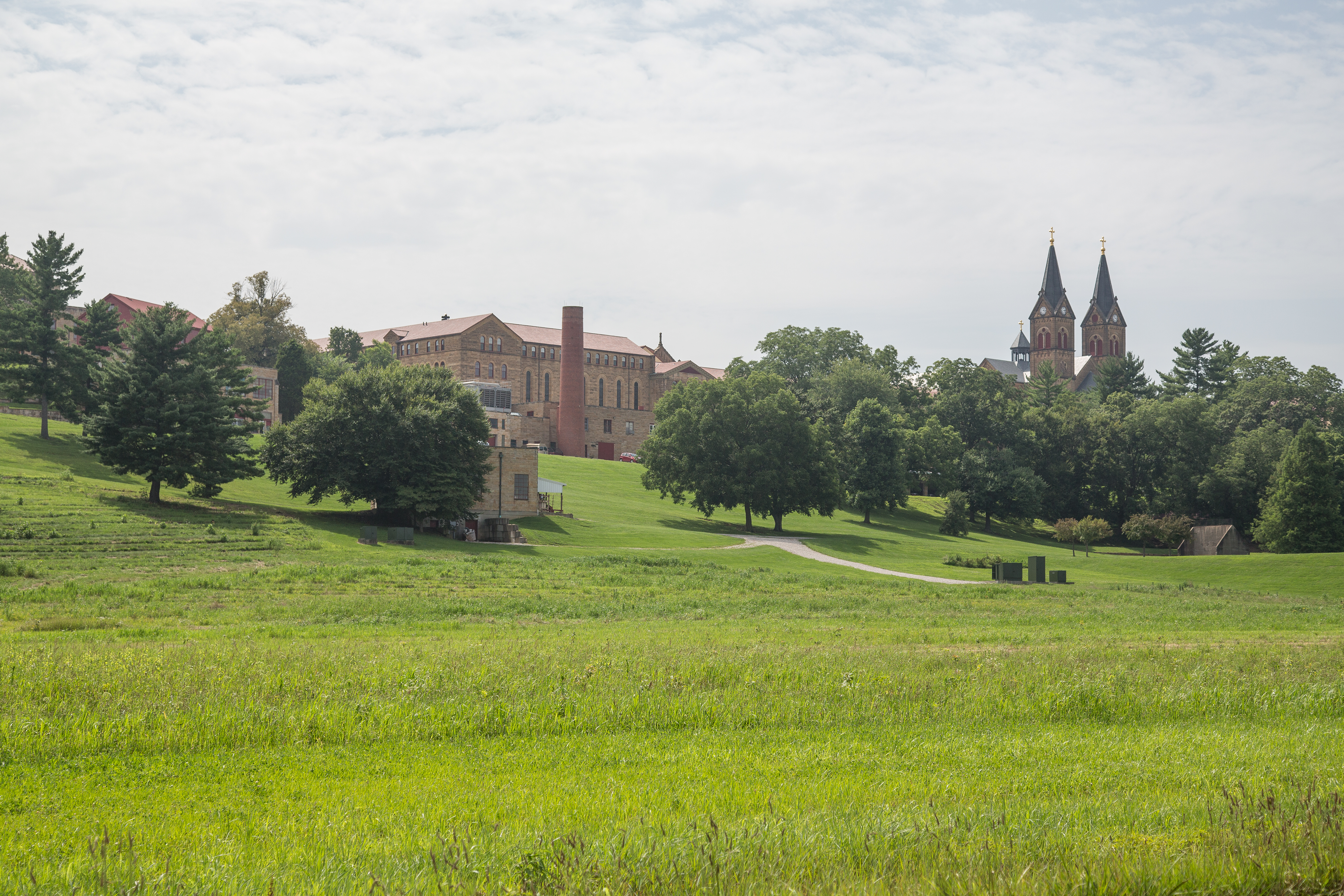
Saint Meinrad

Saint Meinrad was laid out in 1861, and named after the local St. Meinrad Archabbey. A post office has been in operation at Saint Meinrad since 1862.

== Geography ==
=== Climate ===
Climate data for Saint Meinrad, Indiana (1991–2020)
Month	Jan	Feb	Mar	Apr	May	Jun	Jul	Aug	Sep	Oct	Nov	Dec	Year
Mean daily maximum °F (°C)	43.0 (6.1)	48.2 (9.0)	58.2 (14.6)	69.1 (20.6)	77.0 (25.0)	84.3 (29.1)	86.6 (30.3)	86.6 (30.3)	81.6 (27.6)	70.8 (21.6)	57.7 (14.3)	46.8 (8.2)	67.5 (19.7)
Daily mean °F (°C)	34.3 (1.3)	38.5 (3.6)	47.4 (8.6)	57.5 (14.2)	66.1 (18.9)	73.8 (23.2)	76.6 (24.8)	75.9 (24.4)	70.0 (21.1)	58.9 (14.9)	47.3 (8.5)	38.2 (3.4)	57.0 (13.9)
Mean daily minimum °F (°C)	25.7 (−3.5)	28.7 (−1.8)	36.5 (2.5)	46.0 (7.8)	55.2 (12.9)	63.4 (17.4)	66.7 (19.3)	65.1 (18.4)	58.3 (14.6)	47.1 (8.4)	36.9 (2.7)	29.6 (−1.3)	46.6 (8.1)
Average precipitation inches (mm)	3.53 (90)	3.50 (89)	4.75 (121)	4.84 (123)	5.39 (137)	4.82 (122)	4.48 (114)	2.87 (73)	3.56 (90)	3.64 (92)	4.21 (107)	4.04 (103)	49.63 (1,261)
Average snowfall inches (cm)	3.0 (7.6)	2.4 (6.1)	1.3 (3.3)	0.0 (0.0)	0.0 (0.0)	0.0 (0.0)	0.0 (0.0)	0.0 (0.0)	0.0 (0.0)	0.0 (0.0)	0.0 (0.0)	1.6 (4.1)	8.3 (21.1)
Source: NOAA

== Demographics ==
Historical population
Census	Pop.	Note	%±
2020	664		—
U.S. Decennial Census

== Notable person ==
- Howard Schnellenberger, former head college and football coach, Baltimore Colts and the University of Miami, where he coached the 1982 Miami Hurricanes to the first of its five national championships.
