= List of churches in the Diocese of Evansville =

This is a list of churches in the Diocese of Evansville. The diocese covers southwestern Indiana in the United States. It includes the cities of Evansville and Vincennes. The cathedral church of the archdiocese is St. Benedict's Cathedral in Evansville.

== South Deanery ==
The parishes in the deanery are located in Evansville and other nearby communities..

Name	Image	Location	Description/Notes
All Saints		704 N First Ave, Evansville	Formed in 2015 with merger of St. Anthony of Padua and St. Joseph Parishes
			St. Anthony of Padua, Evansville – founded in 1888
			St. Joseph, Evansville – founded in 1905
Annunciation of the Lord		3010 E Chandler Ave, Evansville	Formed in 2014 with merger of Christ the King and Holy Spirit Parishes
			Christ the King – founded in 1942
			Holy Spirit, Evansville – founded in 1952
Good Shepherd		2301 N Stockwell Rd, Evansville	Founded in 1955, merged with St. Theresa Parish in 2016
			St. Theresa Parish – founded in 1947
Holy Redeemer		918 W Mill Rd, Evansville	Founded in 1952
Holy Rosary		1301 S Green River Rd, Evansville	Founded in 1950, merged in 2016 with Nativity Parish
			Nativity, Evansville – founded in 1962
Resurrection		5301 New Harmony Rd, Evansville	Founded in 1954
St. Benedict Cathedral		1328 Lincoln Ave, Evansville	Founded in 1912, dedicated as cathedral in 1999
St. Boniface		418 N Wabash Ave, Evansville	Founded in 1881, merged with Sacred Heart and St. Agnes in 2014
			St. Agnes, Evansville – founded in 1892
			Sacred Heart, Evansville – founded in 1885
St. Clement		422 E Sycamore St, Boonville	Founded in 1880, merged with St. Rupert Parish in 2014
			St. Rupert, Red Bush – founded in 1865
St. John the Baptist		625 Frame Rd, Newburgh	Founded in 1866
St. John the Evangelist		5301 Daylight Drive Evansville	Founded in 1868
St. Joseph		6202 W St. Joseph Rd, Evansville	Founded in 1841
Sts. Mary and John		613 Cherry St, Evansville	Founded in 2015 with the merger of St. Mary, St. John and Trinity Parishes
			St. Mary, Evansville – founded in 1867
			St. John, Evansville – Founded in 1941
			Holy Trinity, Evansville – Founded in 1848

== North Deanery ==
The parishes in this deanery are located in Greene, Knox, Sullivan, Daviess and Martin Counties.

Name	Image	Location	Description/Notes
Holy Name		700 Lincoln Dr,Bloomfield	Founded in 1959
Our Lady of Hope		315 NE Third St, Washington	Founded in 2015 with the merger of St. Simon and St. Mary Parishes
			St. Simon, Washington – founded in 1837
			St. Mary, Sullivan – Founded in 1874
St. Francis Xavier		205 Church St, Vincennes	Founded in 2016 with the merger of Sacred Heart, St. John the Baptist, St. Thomas the Apostle, St. Vincent de Paul and the Basilica of St. Francis Xavier
			Basilica of St. Francis Xavier, Vincennes – founded in 1791
			Sacred Heart, Vincennes – founded in 1908
			St. John the Baptist, Vincennes – founded in 1847
			St. Thomas the Apostle, Vincennes – founded in 1843
			St Vincent de Paul, Vincennes – founded in 1847
St. Joan of Arc		327 W McKinley St. Jasonville	Founded in 1908
St. John		408 Church Street Loogootee	Founded in 1859, merged in 2014 with St. Joseph, St. Mary and St. Martin Parishes
			St. Joseph, Bramble – founded in 1853
			St. Mary, Shoals – founded in 1869
			St. Martin, Winfield – founded in 1875
St. Mary		105 E Jackson Street, Sullivan	Founded in 1867
St. Peter		489 E Street NE, Linton	Founded in 1901
St. Peter		305 N Second St, Montgomery	Founded in 1818, merged in 2014 with All Saints Parish
			All Saints, Cannelburg – founded in 1891
St. Philip Neri		605 W Fourth St, Bicknell	Founded in 1908

== East Deanery ==
The parishes in this deanery are located in Dubois and Spencer Counties.

Name	Image	Location	Description/Notes
Christ the King		341 E 10th St, Ferdinand	Founded in 2017 with the merger of St. Ferdinand and St. Henry Parishes
			St. Ferdinand, Ferdinand – founded in 1853
			St. Henry, St. Henry – founded in 1862
Divine Mercy		4444 Ohio St, St. Anthony	Founded in 2016 with the merger of St. Anthony and Sacred Heart Parishes
			St. Anthony, St. Anthony – founded in 1864
			Sacred Heart – founded in 1876
Holy Family		950 E Church Ave, Jasper	Founded in 1948
Precious Blood		1385 W Sixth St, Jasper	Founded in 1954
St. Bernard		547 Elm St, Rockport	Founded in 1850
St. Francis of Assisi		8 E Maple St, Dale	Founded in 2015 with the merge of St. Joseph, St. Nicholas and Mary, Help of Christians Parishes
			St. Joseph, Dale – founded in 1909
			Mary, Help of Christians, Dale – founded in 1857
			St. Nicholas, Santa Claus – founded in 1991
St. Isidore the Farmer		6864 E State Rd, Celestine	Founded in 2016 with the merger of St. Celestine and St. Raphael Parishes
			St. Celestine Parish, Celestine – founded in 1843
			St. Raphael Parish, Dubois – founded in 1899
St. Joseph		1029 Kundek St, Jasper	Founded in 1837
St. Martin I		58 S Church St, Chrisney	Founded in 1866, merged with St. John Chrysostom Parish in 2014
			St. John Chrysostom, New Boston – founded in 1862
St. Mary's		317 N Washington St, Huntingburg	Founded in 1861
St. Mary of the Annunciation		2831 N 500 W, Jasper	Founded in 1891

== West Deanery ==
The parishes in this deanery are located in Gibson, Pike and Posey Counties, along with the western part of Vanderburgh County.

Name	Image	Location	Description/Notes
Blessed Sacrament		11092 E. Lincoln Heights Rd, Oakland City	Founded in 1948
Corpus Christi		5528 Hogue Rd, Evansville	Founded in 1955
Holy Cross		305 E. Walnut St, Fort Branch	Founded in 1947
St. Bernard		5342 E. State Rd 168, Fort Branch	Founded in 1877
St. Francis Xavier		10 N. St. Francis Ave, Poseyville	Founded in 1866, merged in 2014 with Holy Angels Parish
			Holy Angels, New Harmony – founded in 1898
St. James		12300 S 50 W, Haubstadt	Founded in 1947
St. Joseph		410 S. Race St, Princeton	Founded in 1867
St. Joseph		6202 W St. Joseph Rd, Evansville	Founded in 1841
St. Matthew		421 Mulberry St, Mount Vernon	Founded in 1857
St. Philip		3500 St. Philip Rd South, Mount Vernon	Founded in 1847
St. Wendel		10542 W Boonville-New Harmony Rd, Evansville	Founded in 1842
Sts. Peter and Paul		211 N. Vine St, Haubstadt	Founded in 1877
Sts. Peter and Paul		711 Walnut St, Petersburg	Founded in 1847

== See also ==
Diocese of Evansville
