= Black Oak, Indiana =

Black Oak is the name of the following places in the U.S. state of Indiana:

- Black Oak, Daviess County, Indiana
- Black Oak, Lake County, Indiana
