= Henry Joseph Grimmelsmann =

His Excellency, The Most Reverend Henry Joseph Grimmelsman
- Bishop of Evansville; Titular Bishop of Tabla
- See: Diocese of Evansville
- In office: 1944-1965
- Successor: Paul Francis Leibold
- Previous post: Rector of the Pontifical College Josephinum (1932 to 1944)

Orders
- Ordination: August 15, 1915 by Henry K. Moeller
- Consecration: December 21, 1945 by Amleto Giovanni Cicognani

Personal details
- Born: December 22, 1890 Cincinnati, Ohio, US
- Died: June 26, 1972 (aged 81) Evansville, Indiana, US
- Buried: St. Joseph Cemetery
- Denomination: Roman Catholic
- Parents: G.H. and Frances Grimmelsman
- Education: St. Gregory Preparatory Seminary; St. Joseph's College; University of Innsbruck; Catholic University of America

Henry Joseph Grimmelsmann (December 22, 1890 – June 26, 1972) was an American prelate of the Roman Catholic Church. He served as the first bishop of the new Diocese of Evansville in Indiana from 1944 to 1965.

== Biography ==
=== Early life ===
Henry Grimmelsmann was born on December 22, 1890, in Cincinnati, Ohio, to G.H. and Frances Grimmelsmann. Raised in the Price Hill neighborhood of Cincinnati, he was one of ten children; three of his sisters became nuns and another brother also became a priest. As a child he attended Holy Family School, where one of his classmates was future Bishop Urban Vehr.

Grimmelsmann studied at St. Gregory Preparatory Seminary in Cincinnati (1904–1907) and at St. Joseph's College in Rensselaer, Indiana (1907–1909). He then entered the University of Innsbruck in Austria-Hungary, but was forced to return to Cincinnati following the outbreak of World War I.

==== Priesthood ====
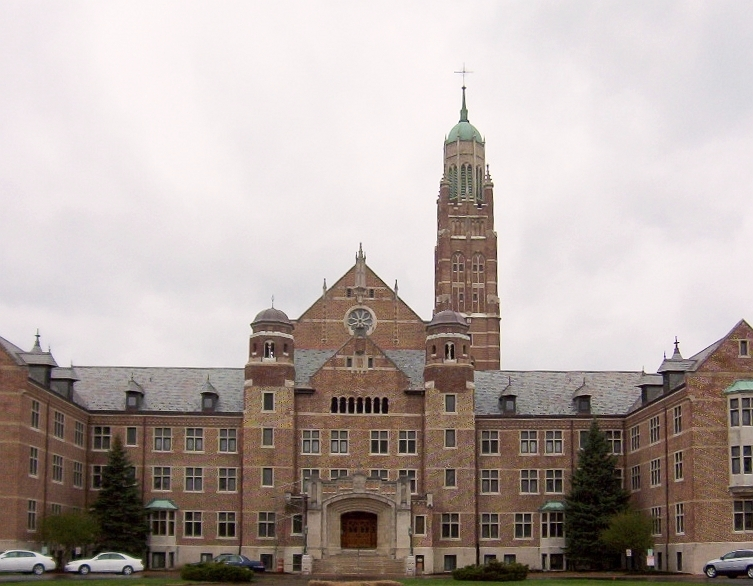
Pontifical College Josephinum, Worthington, Ohio (2013)

Grimmelsmann was ordained to the priesthood for the Archdiocese of Cincinnati by Archbishop Henry K. Moeller in Cincinnati on August 15, 1915. After his ordination, Grimmelsmann went to Washington D.C. to study at the Catholic University of America. He later returned to the University of Innsbruck, where he earned a Doctor of Sacred Scripture degree. Back in Cincinnati, the archdiocese assigned Grimmelsmann served as a curate at St. Lawrence Parish in that city In 1920, Grimmelsmann was named vice-rector and professor of sacred scripture and Hebrew at Mount St. Mary's Seminary in Cincinnati Pope Pius XI named him rector of the Pontifical College Josephinum at Worthington, Ohio, in 1932.

==== Bishop of Evansville ====
On November 11, 1944, Grimmelsmann was appointed the first bishop of the newly erected Diocese of Evansville by Pope Pius XII. He received his episcopal consecration at the Josephinum on December 21, 1944, from Archbishop Amleto Cicognani, with Bishops Urban Vehr and George Rehring serving as co-consecrators. Between 1962 and 1965, Grimmelsmann attended all four sessions of the Second Vatican Council in Rome.

=== Retirement and death ===
Pope Paul VI accepted Grimmelsmann's resignation as bishop of Evansville on October 18, 1965, and named time titular bishop of Tabla. Henry Grimmelsmann died in Evansville on June 26, 1972, at age 81, and was buried at St. Joseph Cemetery in Evansville.

== See also ==
Catholic Church titles
Preceded by none	Bishop of Evansville; 1944—1965	Succeeded by Paul Francis Leibold
