= RCDE =

RCDE could stand for:

- Reial Club Deportiu Espanyol de Barcelona, a sports club in Barcelona, Spain
- Roman Catholic Diocese of Erie, a catholic diocese in western Pennsylvania
- Roman Catholic Diocese of Evansville, a catholic diocese in Southwestern Indiana
