= Marty Amsler =

American football player (1942–2024)

No. 79, 81, 87, 89
- Position: Defensive end

Personal information
- Born: October 26, 1942; Evansville, Indiana, U.S.
- Died: January 4, 2024 (aged 81); Evansville, Indiana, U.S.
- Listed height: 6 ft 5 in (1.96 m)
- Listed weight: 255 lb (116 kg)

Career information
- High school: Benjamin Bosse (Evansville)
- College: Indiana (1960); Evansville (1962-1964)
- NFL draft: 1965: 18th round, 243rd overall pick

Career history
- Dallas Cowboys (1965)*; Denver Broncos (1966)*; Wheeling Ironmen (1966); Chicago Bears (1967–1969); Cincinnati Bengals (1970); Green Bay Packers (1970); Denver Broncos (1971)*
- * Offseason or practice squad member only

Awards and highlights
- NFL All-Rookie Team (1967); All-ICC (1964)

Career NFL statistics
- Fumble recoveries: 2
- Interceptions: 1
- Sacks: 3
- Stats at Pro Football Reference

Charles Martin Amsler (October 26, 1942 – January 4, 2024) was an American professional football player who was a defensive end in the National Football League (NFL) for the Chicago Bears, Cincinnati Bengals, and Green Bay Packers. He played college football for the Evansville Purple Aces.

== Early life ==
Amsler went to Benjamin Bosse High School in Evansville, Indiana, and graduated in 1960. He graduated from University of Evansville in 1967.

In 1964, he was named to the All-Conference team of the Indiana Collegiate Conference at defensive end.

Amsler was inducted into the University of Evansville Hall of Fame and the Indiana Football Hall of Fame in 1979 and 2001 respectively.

== Professional career ==
=== Dallas Cowboys ===
Amsler was selected in the 18th round (243rd overall) of the 1965 NFL draft by the Dallas Cowboys. He became the first graduate from the University of Evansville to be drafted into the NFL. He was waived before the season started and returned to Evansville, to serve as an assistant coach for the offensive and defensive linemen.

=== Denver Broncos (first stint) ===
Amsler signed with the Denver Broncos as a free agent in 1966, but was cut before the season started.

=== Wheeling Ironmen ===
In 1966, he played defensive end for the Wheeling Ironmen of the Continental Football League.

=== Chicago Bears ===
Amsler signed as a free agent with the Chicago Bears in 1967 and played in fourteen games that season, registering one interception and one fumble recovered. He missed the 1968 season with a torn Achilles tendon. The next year, he played in eleven games and recorded one fumble recovery. He was released on September 14, 1970.

=== Cincinnati Bengals ===
Amsler was claimed off waivers by the Cincinnati Bengals on September 15, 1970, and played three games before being cut.

=== Green Bay Packers ===
The Green Bay Packers signed Amsler to their taxi squad on October 18, 1970, before activating him in week six and playing him the rest of the season (9 games). He also played on special teams.

=== Denver Broncos (second stint) ===
Amsler signed with the Denver Broncos as a free agent in 1971, but was released on September 2. Throughout his entire NFL career he played in 37 games and started in 20.

== Personal life ==
Amsler was a member of the NFL Players Association Former Players Board of Directors. He lived in Evansville, Indiana and Mount Prospect, Illinois. While living in Mount Prospect, he was named to the board of directors for the satellite branch of the Franklin Boulevard Community Hospital proposed for just south of Wheeling. He had a son named C. Martin Amsler III.

Amsler died in Evansville, Indiana, on January 4, 2024, at the age of 81.
