= Cannelburg, Indiana =

- Town
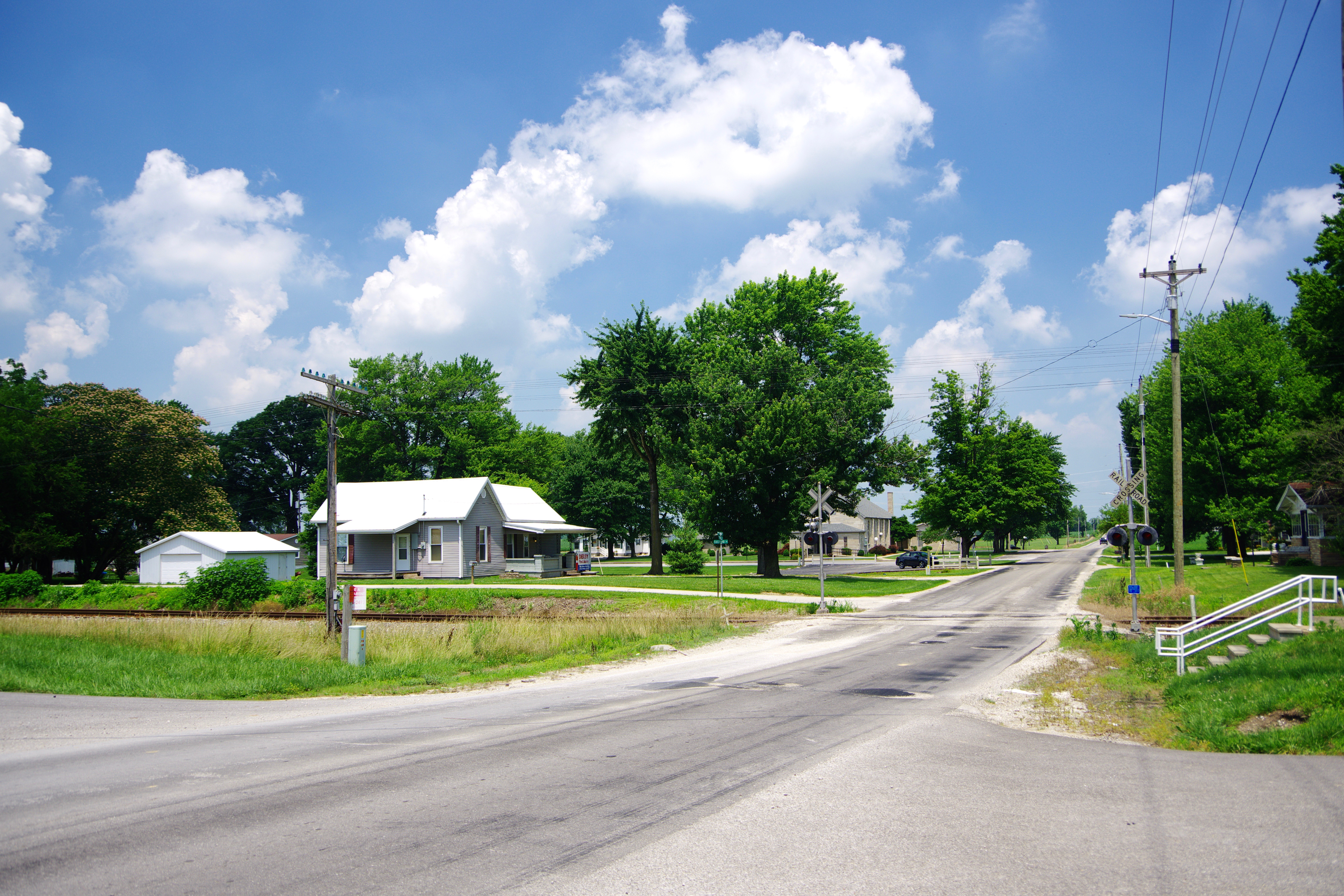
- Main Street

- Location of Cannelburg in Daviess County, Indiana.
- Coordinates: 38°40′07″N 87°00′05″W
- Country: United States
- State: Indiana
- County: Daviess
- Township: Barr

Area
  - Total: 0.21 sq mi (0.54 km^{2})
  - Land: 0.21 sq mi (0.54 km^{2})
  - Water: 0 sq mi (0.00 km^{2})
- Elevation: 561 ft (171 m)

Population (2020)
  - Total: 176
  - Density: 850.0/sq mi (328.19/km^{2})
- Time zone: UTC-5 (EST)
  - Summer (DST): UTC-5 (EST)
- ZIP code: 47519
- Area code: 812
- FIPS code: 18-10090
- GNIS feature ID: 2396626

Cannelburg is a town in Barr Township, Daviess County, Indiana, United States. The population was 176 at the 2020 census.

== History ==
Cannelburg was platted in 1872, and named for the cannel coal mined in the area.

== Geography ==
Cannelburg is concentrated along Main Street, which runs northward perpendicular to U.S. Route 50/U.S. Route 150. Loogootee lies to the east, and Montgomery lies to the west.

According to the 2010 census, Cannelburg has a total area of 0.19 square miles (0.49 km^{2}), all land.

== Demographics ==
Historical population
Census	Pop.	Note	%±
1880	159		—
1890	276		73.6%
1900	280		1.4%
1910	300		7.1%
1920	224		−25.3%
1930	132		−41.1%
1940	145		9.8%
1950	128		−11.7%
1960	124		−3.1%
1970	149		20.2%
1980	152		2.0%
1990	97		−36.2%
2000	140		44.3%
2010	135		−3.6%
2020	176		30.4%
U.S. Decennial Census

=== 2010 census ===
As of the census of 2010, there were 135 people, 57 households, and 41 families residing in the town. The population density was 710.5 inhabitants per square mile (274.3/km^{2}). There were 58 housing units at an average density of 305.3 per square mile (117.9/km^{2}). The racial makeup of the town was 99.3% White and 0.7% from two or more races. Hispanic or Latino of any race were 0.7% of the population.

There were 57 households, of which 29.8% had children under the age of 18 living with them, 59.6% were married couples living together, 7.0% had a female householder with no husband present, 5.3% had a male householder with no wife present, and 28.1% were non-families. 26.3% of all households were made up of individuals, and 14% had someone living alone who was 65 years of age or older. The average household size was 2.37 and the average family size was 2.85.

The median age in the town was 44.2 years. 21.5% of residents were under the age of 18; 10.4% were between the ages of 18 and 24; 20% were from 25 to 44; 28.1% were from 45 to 64; and 20% were 65 years of age or older. The gender makeup of the town was 53.3% male and 46.7% female.

=== 2000 census ===
As of the census of 2000, there were 140 people, 51 households, and 42 families residing in the town. The population density was 747.3 inhabitants per square mile (288.5/km^{2}). There were 54 housing units at an average density of 288.3 per square mile (111.3/km^{2}). The racial makeup of the town was 100.00% White.

There were 51 households, out of which 43.1% had children under the age of 18 living with them, 64.7% were married couples living together, 11.8% had a female householder with no husband present, and 17.6% were non-families. 17.6% of all households were made up of individuals, and 5.9% had someone living alone who was 65 years of age or older. The average household size was 2.75 and the average family size was 3.07.

In the town, the population was spread out, with 33.6% under the age of 18, 7.1% from 18 to 24, 29.3% from 25 to 44, 19.3% from 45 to 64, and 10.7% who were 65 years of age or older. The median age was 32 years. For every 100 females, there were 94.4 males. For every 100 females age 18 and over, there were 102.2 males.

The median income for a household in the town was $37,917, and the median income for a family was $37,917. Males had a median income of $32,083 versus $16,458 for females. The per capita income for the town was $12,674. There were 20.9% of families and 14.9% of the population living below the poverty line, including 11.8% of under eighteens and none of those over 64.
