= Paul Francis Leibold =

American clergyman

His Excellency, The Most Reverend Paul Francis Leibold
- Archbishop of Cincinnati; Titular Bishop of Trebenna
- See: Archdiocese of Cincinnati
- In office: October 2, 1969; June 1, 1972
- Predecessor: Karl Joseph Alter
- Successor: Joseph L. Bernardin
- Previous posts: Auxiliary Bishop of Cincinnati; 1958 - 1966; Bishop of Evansville; 1966 - 1969

Orders
- Ordination: May 18, 1940 by John T. McNicholas
- Consecration: June 17, 1958 by Karl Joseph Alter

Personal details
- Born: December 22, 1914 Dayton, Ohio, USA
- Died: June 1, 1972 (aged 57) Cincinnati, Ohio, USA
- Denomination: Roman Catholic
- Education: Saint Gregory Seminary; Mount St. Mary's Seminary
- Motto: Caritas in humilitate (Love in humility)
- Coat of arms

Paul Francis Leibold (December 22, 1914 – June 1, 1972) was an American Catholic prelate who served as Archbishop of Cincinnati from 1969 until his death in 1972. He previously served as Bishop of Evansville from 1966 to 1969 and as an Auxiliary Bishop of Cincinnati from 1958 to 1966.

== Biography ==
=== Early life ===
Paul Leibold was born on December 22, 1914, in Dayton, Ohio, to Frank and Philomena (née Kirchner) Leibold. He attended Holy Trinity primary school and Chaminade High School, both in Dayton. Leibold then spent two years of college at the University of Dayton. After deciding to enter the priesthood, he entered Saint Gregory Seminary, then finished his preparation at Mount St. Mary's Seminary in Cincinnati, Ohio.

=== Priesthood ===
Leibold was ordained a priest for the Archdiocese of Cincinnati on May 18, 1940, by Archbishop John T. McNicholas in Cincinnati. He served as pastor of St. Louis Parish in Cincinnati, and assistant chancellor and chancellor for the archdiocese.

In the late 1950s, Leibold became the spiritual advisor for Mildred Ephrem Neuzil, a nun from Our Lady of the Nativity Convent in New Riegel, Ohio. Between 1956 and 1959, Neuzil reported that Mary, mother of Jesus, had appeared to her on several occasions and proclaimed herself as the "Lady of America". According to Neuzil, the apparitions gave her a message calling for Americans to return to purity. Leibold gave his approval for private devotion to Our Lady and allowed the striking of a medal to honor her.

=== Auxiliary Bishop of Cincinnati ===
On April 10, 1958, Leibold was appointed as titular bishop of Trebenna and as auxiliary bishop of Cincinnati by Pope John XXIII. Leibold was consecrated at the Cathedral of St. Peter in Chains in Cincinnati on June 17, 1958, by Archbishop Karl Joseph Alter.

=== Bishop of Evansville ===
On April 4, 1966, Leibold was appointed by Pope Paul VI as bishop of Evansville. He was installed on June 15, 1966.

=== Archbishop of Cincinnati ===
Paul VI appointed Leibold as the sixth archbishop of Cincinnati on July 23, 1969. He was installed on October 2, 1969. One historian has characterized Leibold as "both a warm-hearted, approachable pastor and a hard-worker." Leibold strengthened the Priests' Senate, the Pastoral Council, and the parish councils of the archdiocese. He also launched the archdiocese's sixth synod, Synod '71.

As archbishop, Leibold allowed the publication of two pamphlets about the Neuzil apparitions. He also commissioned a wooden plaque with an image of Our Lady of America for display at the New Riegel convent. In September 1971, Leibold criticized composer Leonard Bernstein's theatrical work Mass, terming it as offensive.

=== Death and legacy ===
Paul Leibold died at Good Samaritan Hospital in Cincinnati on June 1, 1972, after suffering a stroke that day. He is buried at Gate of Heaven Cemetery in Cincinnati, Ohio. The Bishop Leibold School in Miamisburg, Ohio, and the Archbishop Leibold Home for the Aged in Cincinnati are named for him.

In 2020, the US Conference of Catholic Bishops commissioned a panel of five bishops to investigate the Neuzil apparitions. The panel concluded that her apparitions were not supernatural in nature and that public devotion to them was inappropriate.

Catholic Church titles
Preceded by Henry Joseph Grimmelsman	Bishop of Evansville; 1944–1965	Succeeded by Francis Raymond Shea
Preceded by Karl Joseph Alter	Archbishop of Cincinnati; 1969–1972	Succeeded by Joseph L. Bernardin
