= Rivet Middle & High School =

Jean Francois Rivet High School
- Rivet High School; Vincennes Rivet High School

Location
- 210 Barnett Street; Vincennes, Indiana 47591; United States; 38°40′41″N 87°32′4″W

Information
- Type: Private, Coeducational
- Religious affiliation: Roman Catholic
- Principal: Janice L. Vantlin-Jones
- Grades: 6–12
  - Grade 6: 21
  - Grade 7: 25
  - Grade 8: 15
  - Grade 9: 31
  - Grade 10: 22
  - Grade 11: 21
  - Grade 12: 20
- Average class size: 20
- Hours in school day: 8-3:15
- Campus size: 1
- Colors: Purple; Gold
- Athletics: IHSAA: 1A (All Sports)
- Athletics conference: Blue Chip Conference
- Team name: Patriots
- Tuition: $2,280 (Parish) $2,845 (Non-Parish)
- Gym Capacity: 1,200
- Athletic Director: Luke Keller
- Website: rivetchs.org

Jean Francois Rivet High School, Vincennes Rivet High School, or simply Rivet Middle & High School (within Vincennes) is a private, Roman Catholic high school in Vincennes, Indiana, United States. It is part of the Roman Catholic Diocese of Evansville.

== Background ==
In 1924, the Gibault High School was built for Catholic males. It closed in 1935 but was reopened in 1947 as Central Catholic High School. Central Catholic became co-educational during the 1970–71 school year when it was joined with the all-female St. Rose Academy. The name was changed to Rivet High School, in honor of Jesuit priest Jean Francois Rivet who in 1795 had been paid by President Washington to run a school in Vincennes, the first public school established in the Indiana Territory.

== Notable alumni ==
- Bruce Bouillet

== See also ==
- List of high schools in Indiana
