= St. Benedict Cathedral (Evansville, Indiana) =

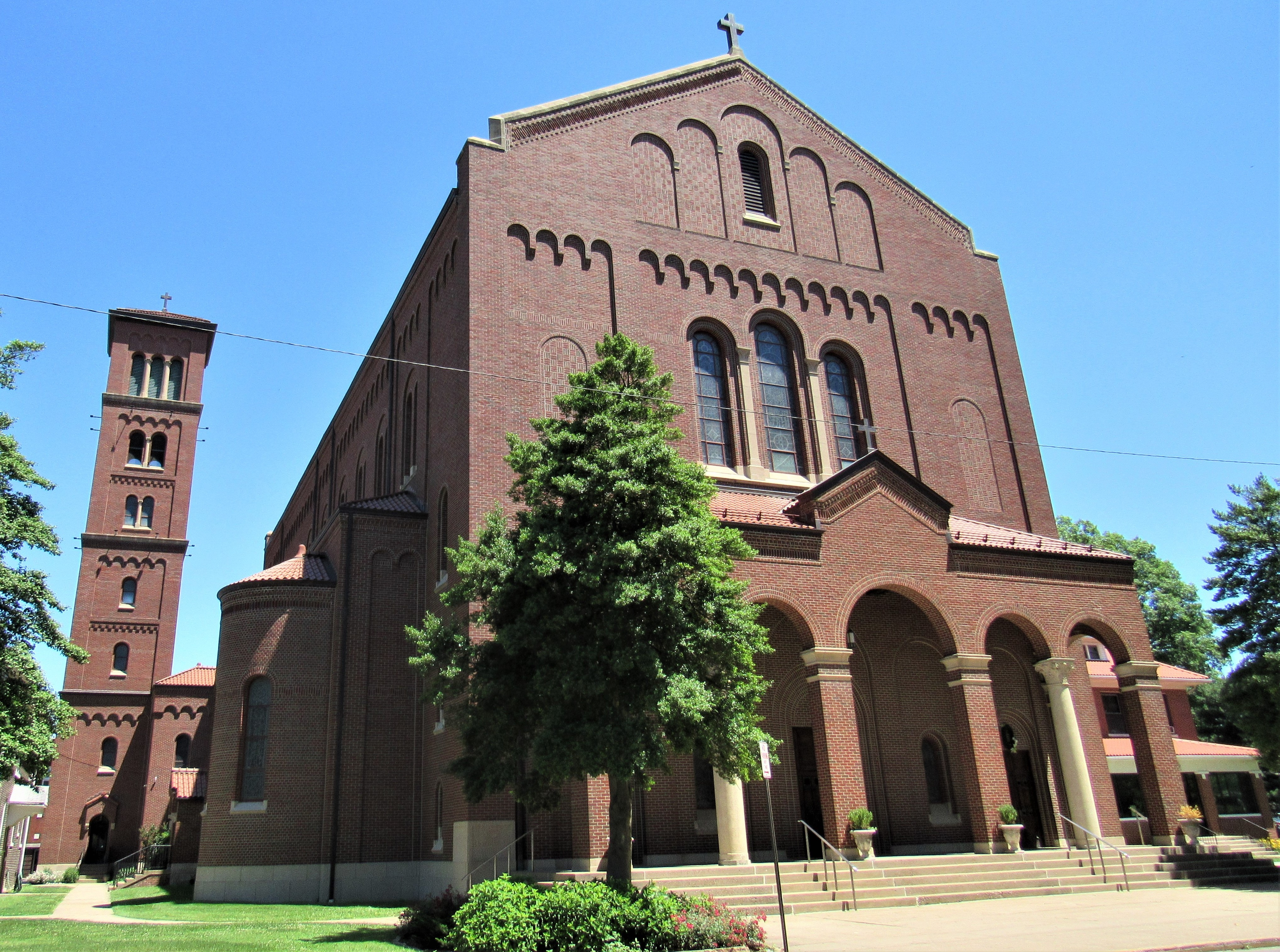
- St. Benedict Cathedral
- Location: 1320 Lincoln Ave. Evansville, Indiana
- Country: United States
- Denomination: Catholic Church
- Website: www.saintbenedictcathedral.org

History
- Status: Cathedral/Parish
- Founded: 1912 (parish)
- Dedication: Benedict of Nursia
- Dedicated: March 18, 1928

Architecture
- Functional status: Active
- Architect: Edward J. Thole (Cathedral)
- Style: Lombard-Basilica
- Completed: 1928
- Construction cost: $230,000

Specifications
- Capacity: 1,000
- Materials: Brick

Administration
- Diocese: Evansville

Clergy
- Bishop: Most Rev. Joseph M. Siegel
- Rector: Fr Alex Zenthoefer
- St. Benedict's Catholic Church, Rectory, and School
- U.S. Historic district – Contributing property
- Location within Indiana Location within the United States
- Coordinates: 37°58′12″N 87°32′26.16″W
- Architect: Frank J. Schlotter (school); August Gehlhausen (rectory)
- Part of: Lincolnshire Historic District (ID89001426)
- Added to NRHP: October 2, 1989

St. Benedict Cathedral is a Catholic cathedral in Evansville, Indiana. It is the seat of the Diocese of Evansville. The cathedral, rectory and original school building are contributing properties in the Lincolnshire Historic District on the National Register of Historic Places.

== History ==
=== St. Benedict Parish ===
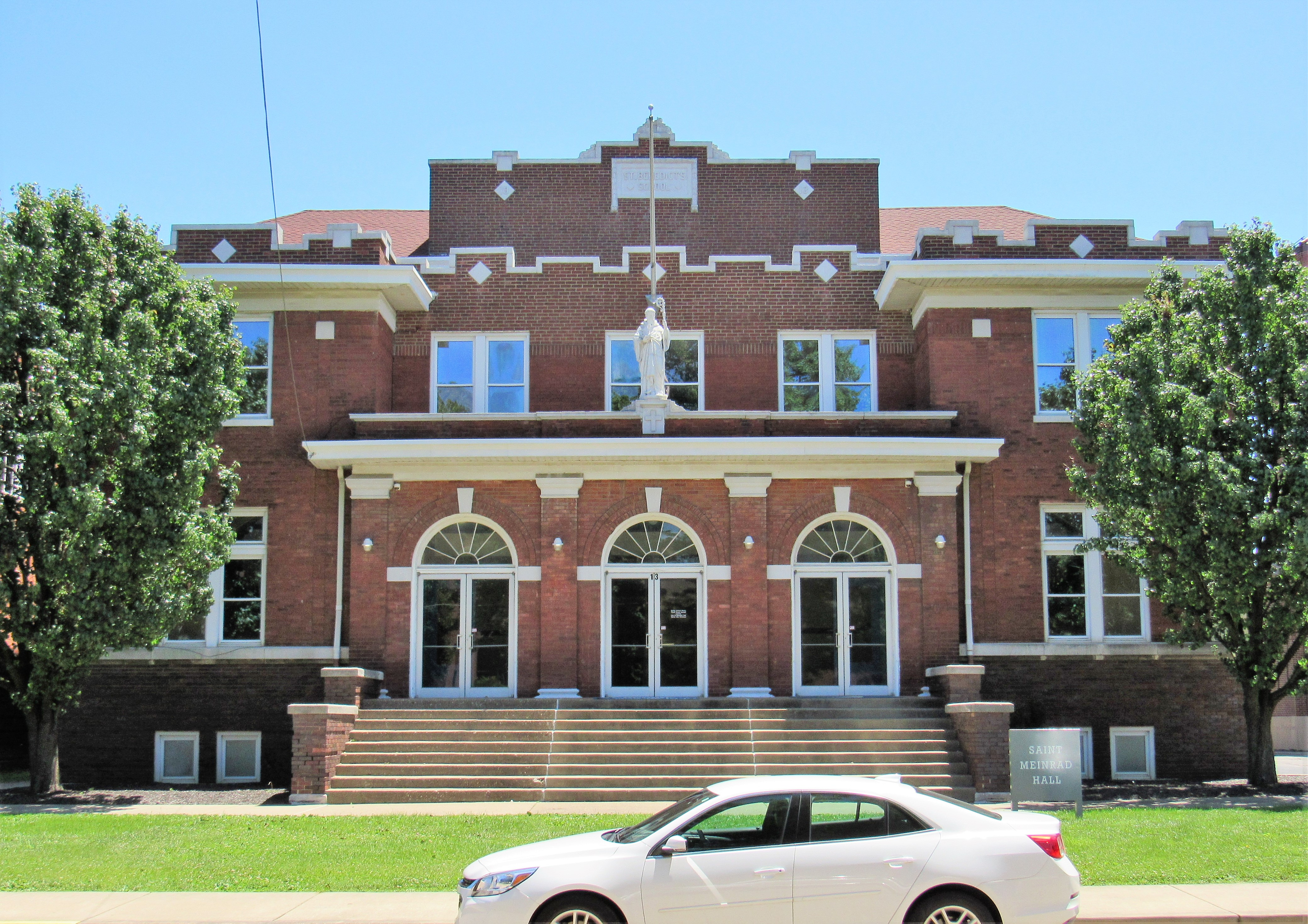
Original parish building

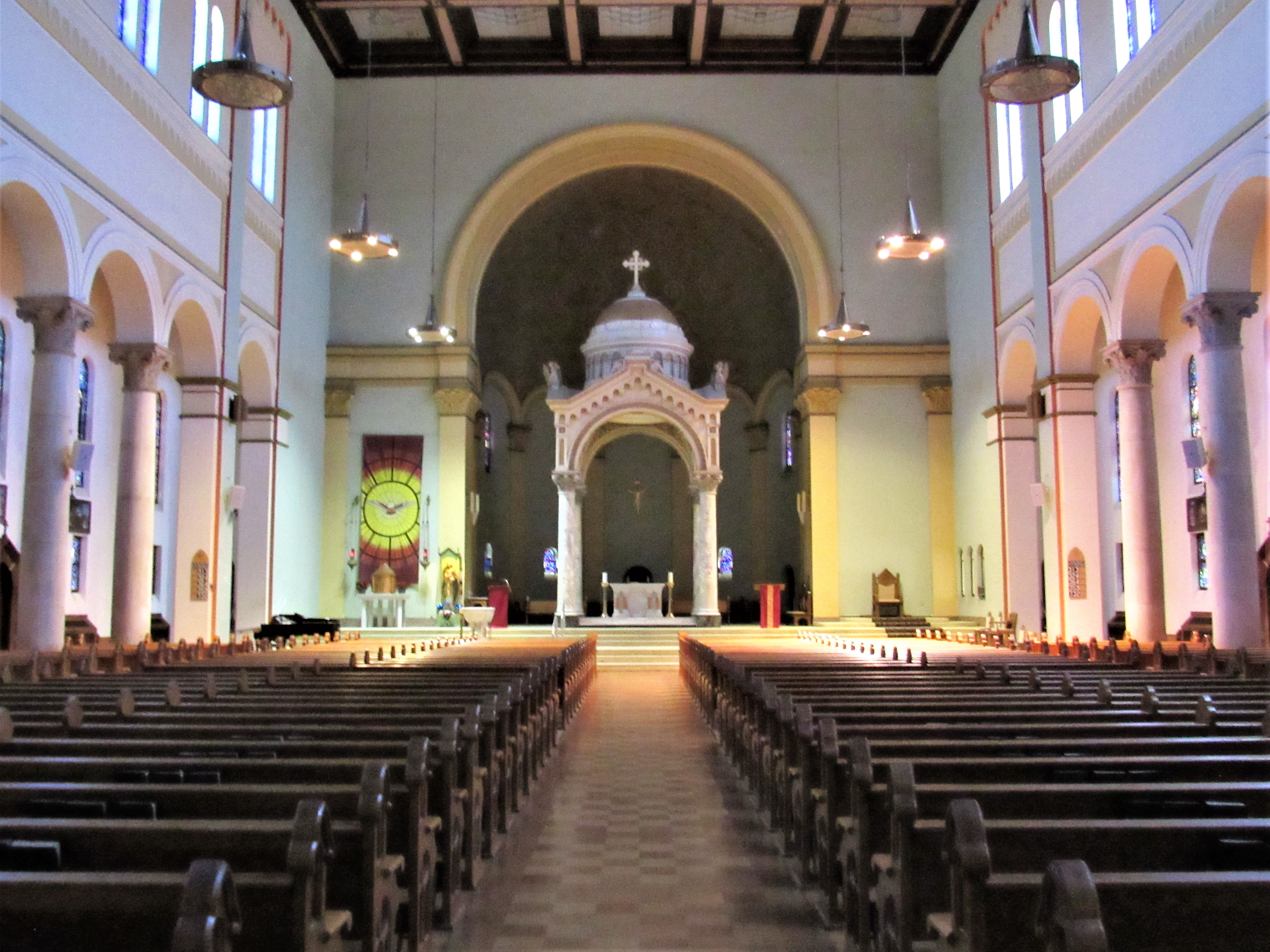
Cathedral interior

St. Benedict Parish was established in 1912 to take care of the Catholics who lived east of the downtown area. The pastoral care for the parish was given to Benedictine Monks from St. Meinrad Abbey. A two-story brick building was constructed to serve as a combination church and school. It was designed by local architect Frank J. Schlotter in the Neoclassical style. It was built by local contractor, and parishioner, Michael J. Hoffman. An assembly hall was located in the basement, classrooms were located on the first floor, and the church sanctuary was on the second floor. After the present church building was completed in 1928, the second floor was converted into classroom space. A Modern movement addition was completed in 1953.

A two-story, brick, American Foursquare convent was built for the teaching sisters in 1913. A rectory for the resident clergy was completed in 1921 for $25,000. The two-story brick structure was designed by August Gehlhausen in the Colonial Revival style. It features a two-story, full length, front porch.

The present church building was completed in 1928 in the Lombard-Basilica style. It was designed by local architect Edward J. Thole of the architectural firm of Thole & Legeman. Parishioner Michael Hoffman again served as the contractor. The church features ceilings that are 65 feet (20 m) high, a baldachin over the altar and a seating capacity of over 1,000 people. Zettler Art Glass Company of Munich, Germany produced the stained glass windows. The altars are composed of Italian marble. The campanile rises 130 feet (40 m). The church was dedicated on March 18, 1928, by Abbot Athanasius Schmidt, OSB.

The interior of the church was renovated after the liturgical reforms of the Second Vatican Council. The baldachin was moved forward about 25 feet (8 m) and the former high altar was dismantled and a new altar was created. Two of Evansville's bishops were ordained and installed in St. Benedict's before it became a cathedral; Francis R. Shea in 1970 and Gerald A. Gettelfinger on April 11, 1989.

=== St. Benedict Cathedral ===
On October 21, 1944, Pope Pius XII established the Diocese of Evansville. Assumption Church, Evansville's oldest Catholic parish, was chosen as the first cathedral. The property was sold to the city of Evansville who demolished it in 1965 for the new civic center. Holy Trinity, Evansville's second-oldest parish, served as the Proto-cathedral from 1965 to April 11, 1999, when St. Benedict's was consecrated as the third cathedral for the Evansville Diocese.

== Pastors/Rectors ==
The following priests have served as pastor of St. Benedict Parish. Since 1999 they have also served as cathedral rector:

- Rev. Martin Hoppenjans, OSB (1912–1936)
- Rev. Lambert Enslinger, OSB (1936–1939)
- Rev. Thomas Schaefers, OSB (1939–1942)
- Rev. Gilbert Hess, OSB (1942–1943)
- Rev. Gabriel Verkamp, OSB (1943–1963)
- Rev. Father Alban Berling, OSB (1963–1973)
- Revs. Lambert Reilly, OSB and Lawrence Ward, OSB (co-pastors, 1973–1974)
- Rev. Cyril Vrablic, OSB (1974–1977)
- Rev. Camillus Elsperman, OSB (1977–1991)
- Very Rev. Gregory Chamberlin, OSB (1991–2013)
- Bishop Godfrey Mullen, OSB (2013–2022)
- Very Rev. Alex Zenthoefer (2022–present)

== See also ==
- List of Catholic cathedrals in the United States
- List of cathedrals in the United States
- St. Francis Xavier Cathedral and Library in Vincennes, Indiana. It was the cathedral for the Diocese of Vincennes, which is now a parish in the Diocese of Evansville.
