= Benjamin Bosse High School =

Location
- 1300 Washington Avenue; Evansville, Indiana 47714; United States; 37°57′48″N 87°32′24″W

Information
- Type: Public high school
- Established: 1924
- School district: Evansville Vanderburgh School Corporation
- Principal: Aaron Huff
- Teaching staff: 61.09 (FTE)
- Grades: 9-12
- Enrollment: 826 (2023-2024)
- Student to teacher ratio: 13.52
- Color
- Athletics conference: Southern Indiana Athletic Conference
- Nickname: Bulldogs
- Website: Evansville Bosse High School

Benjamin Bosse High School, referred to as Evansville Bosse High School by the IHSAA, is a public high school of the Evansville Vanderburgh School Corporation in Evansville, Indiana, United States. Bosse is the third smallest high school by enrollment of Vanderburgh County's nine high schools. The school is a contributing property to the Lincolnshire Historic District on the National Register of Historic Places.

== History ==
The school was initially financed by Benjamin Bosse, who was the mayor of Evansville from 1914 to 1922. Construction began on the school in 1922 and opened for its first pupils in 1924, serving what was then the east side of Evansville.

Bosse's boys basketball team won the state championship in 1944 the first area team to do so. The school won again in 1945 and 1962. Bosse's band marched in the Orange Bowl in Miami, Florida on New Year's Eve in 1970-1971 and also played in the opening ceremony of the Olympic Games in Munich, Germany.

== Sports ==
Also see: Sports in Evansville

=== State titles ===
- Boys Basketball (1943–44), (1944–45), (1961–62)

== Notable alumni ==
- Marty Amsler, former National Football League defensive end
- Bruce Blackburn (Class of 1956), graphic designer who made the official logos for the National Aeronautics and Space Administration and the United States Bicentennial star.
- Pete Fox, Major League Baseball player from 1933 to 1945.
- Roy Halston Frowick, fashion designer
- Arad McCutchan, Hall of Fame basketball coach, University of Evansville
- Michael Michele, actress, best known for ER
- Talitha Washington, mathematician and STEM education activist at Howard University
- Roger H. Zion, U.S. congressman for Indiana (1967–1975)

== See also ==
- List of high schools in Indiana
