= Mater Dei High School (Evansville, Indiana) =

Location
- 1300 Harmony Way; Evansville, Indiana 47720-6148; United States; 37°59′19″N 87°36′56″W

Information
- Type: Private, Coeducational
- Motto: Enter to learn, Go forth to serve
- Religious affiliation: Roman Catholic
- Established: 1949
- Oversight: Diocese of Evansville
- Principal: Darren Knight
- Chaplain: Alex Zenthoefer
- Grades: 9–12
- Enrollment: 502 (2013-2014)
- Color
- Athletics conference: Southern Indiana Athletic Conference
- Nickname: Wildcats
- Rival: FJ Reitz High School
- Accreditation: North Central Association of Colleges and Schools
- Newspaper: Wildcat Hi-Lights
- Yearbook: Hi-Lights
- Gym Capacity: 2,016
- Website: www.materdeiwildcats.com

Mater Dei High School or Evansville Mater Dei High School is a private Catholic high school on the west side of Evansville, Indiana, constructed in 1949. It is one of two Catholic high schools that serve the students of Vanderburgh, Posey, Gibson, and Warrick counties as part of the Roman Catholic Diocese of Evansville.

== History ==
Timothy Dickel started teaching at the school in 2004. He was the principal from 2007 until 2010, and then president from 2010, until he announced a resignation in 2019.

== Sports ==
=== State titles ===
- Baseball (1998–99), (2026)
- Boys Basketball (2003–04)
- Girls Basketball (2011–12), (2012–13)
- Football (2000), (2022)
- Wrestling (1986), (1995), (1996), (1997), (1998), (1999), (2000), (2001), (2002), (2003), (2006), (2007), (2021)
- Softball (2016)
- Girls Soccer (2017), (2018), (2019)
- Marching Band (2022)

== Notable alumni ==
- Suzanne Crouch, politician, current Lieutenant Governor of Indiana, and former Indiana State Auditor and Indiana State Representative
- Jerad Eickhoff, Major League Baseball pitcher
- Rob Maurer, Major League Baseball First baseman

== See also ==
- List of high schools in Indiana
