= Lincolnshire Historic District =

Historic district in Indiana, United States

- U.S. National Register of Historic Places
- U.S. Historic district
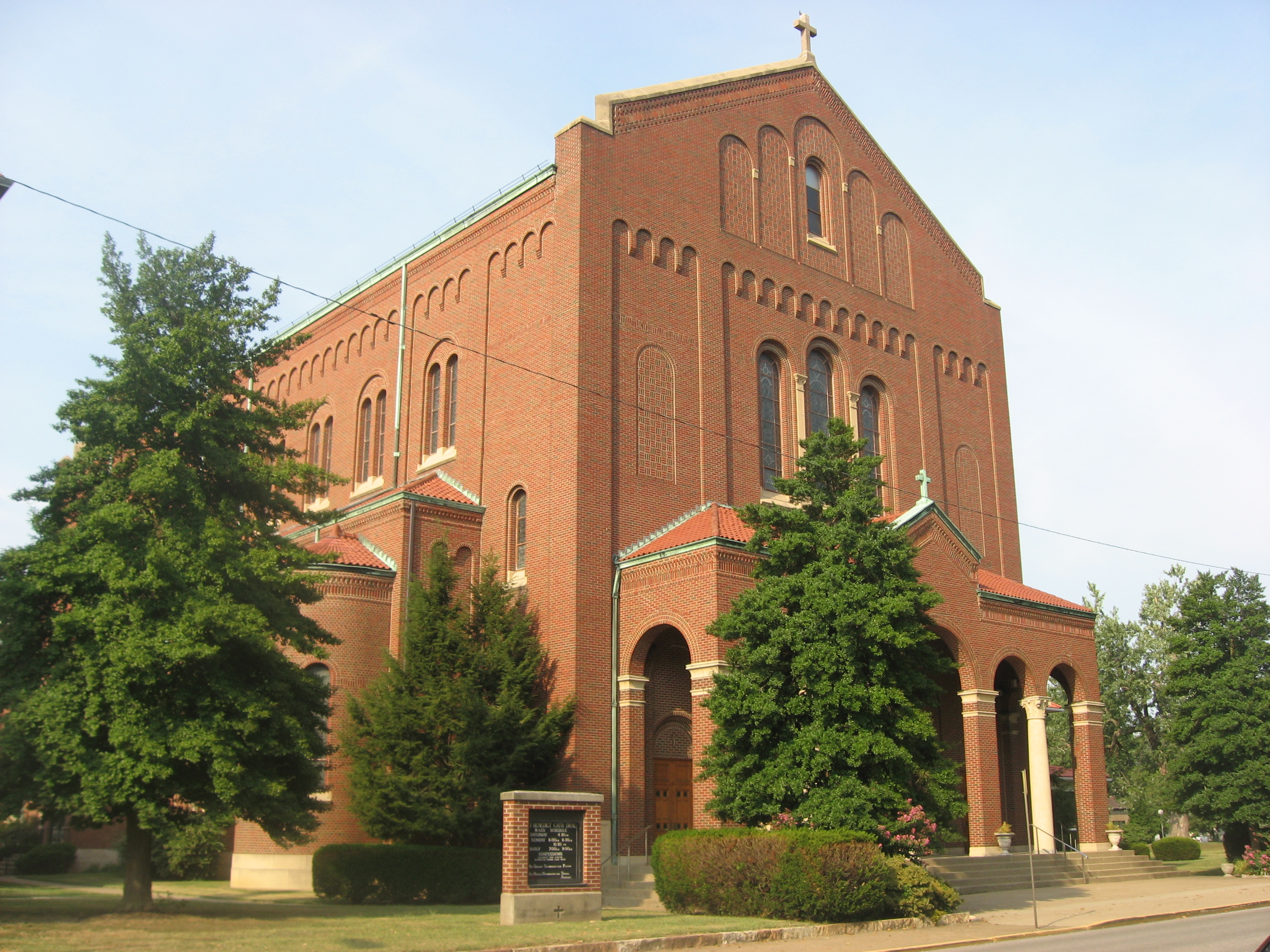
- St. Benedict's Cathedral

- Location within Indiana Location within the United States
- Location: North sides of Lincoln Ave from Harlan Ave to Benninghof Ave, Evansville, Indiana
- Coordinates: 37°57′13″N 87°33′52″W
- Area: 55 acres (22 ha)
- Built: 1923
- Architect: Anderson, John Richard; Veatch, Henry Babcock
- Architectural style: Colonial Revival, Tudor Revival
- NRHP reference No.: 89001426
- Added to NRHP: October 2, 1989

Lincolnshire Historic District is a national historic district located at Evansville, Indiana. The district developed after 1923, and encompasses 95 contributing buildings in a predominantly residential section of Evansville. The district's homes have a mixture of Tudor Revival and Old and new World revival designs, including Colonial Revival. St. Benedict Cathedral and Bosse High School are two landmark buildings from the 1920s and 1930s.

It was listed on the National Register of Historic Places in 1989.

== Gallery ==
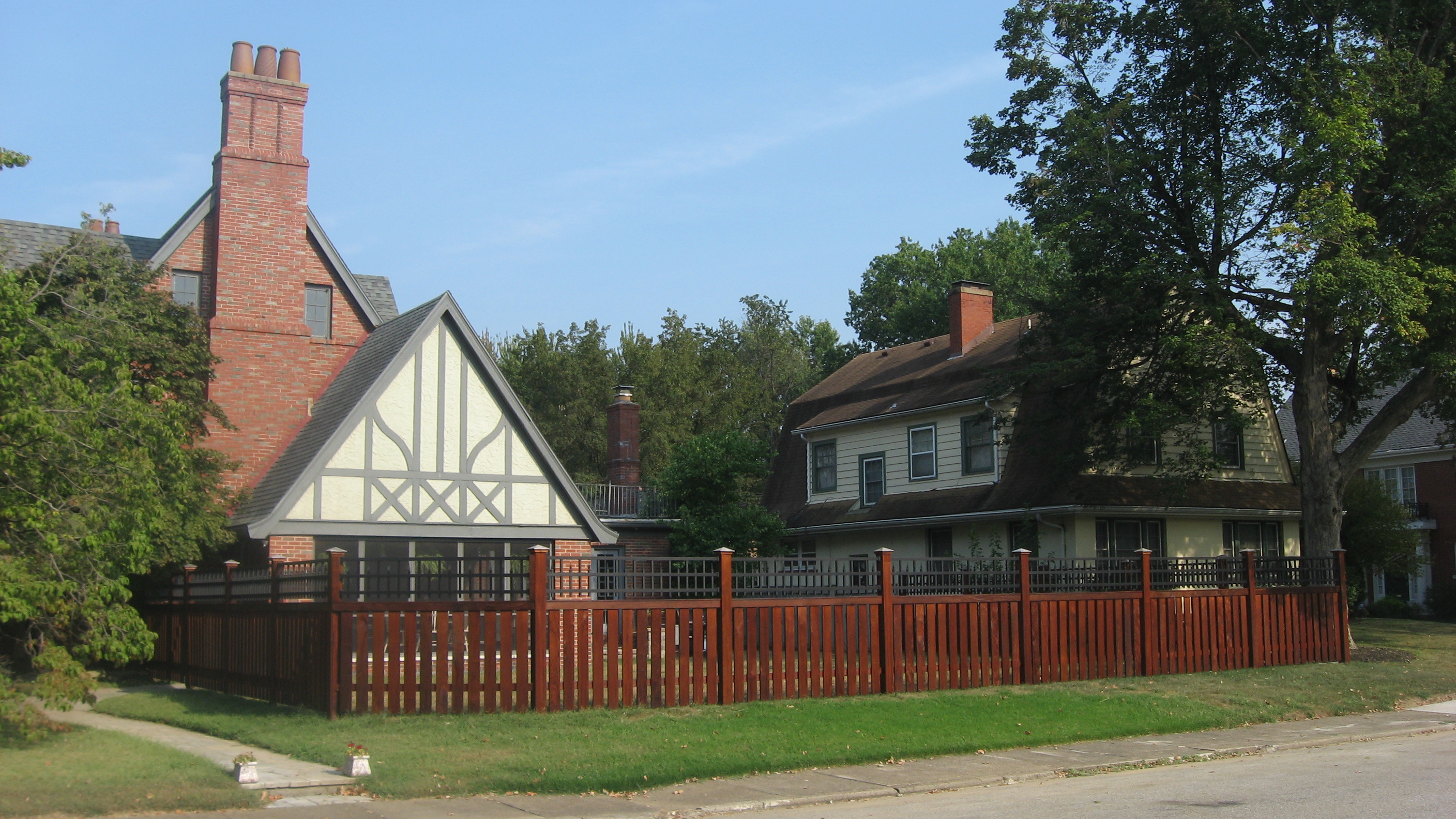
The Pearl B. Combs House (built 1931, Tudor Revival style)
