= Diocese of Evansville =

Latin Catholic jurisdiction in the US

Coordinates: 37°58′38″N 87°33′02″W

Diocese of Evansville Dioecesis Evansvicensis
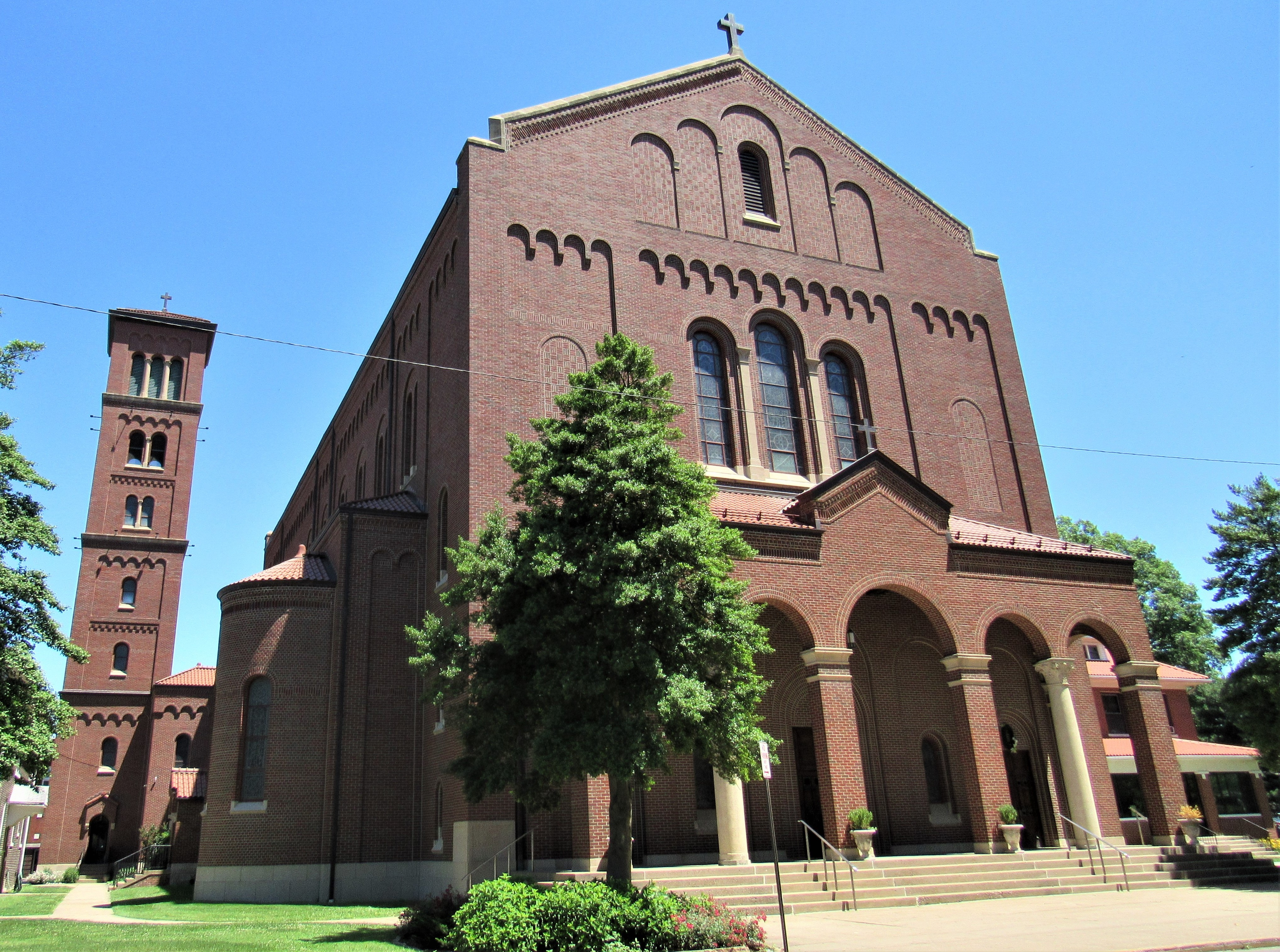
- St. Benedict Cathedral

- Coat of arms

Location
- Country: United States
- Territory: Southwestern Indiana & Lower Wabash Valley
- Ecclesiastical province: Indianapolis

Statistics
- Area: 12,684 km^{2} (4,897 sq mi)
- Population: Total; Catholics: (as of 2010); 507,553; 83,343 (16.4%)
- Parishes: 53

Information
- Denomination: Catholic
- Sui iuris church: Latin Church
- Rite: Roman Rite
- Established: December 21, 1944 (81 years ago)
- Cathedral: St. Benedict Cathedral, Evansville, Indiana
- Patron saint: Mary, Mother of God
- Secular priests: 64

Current leadership
- Pope: Leo XIV
- Bishop: Joseph M. Siegel
- Metropolitan Archbishop: Charles C. Thompson
- Bishops emeritus: Gerald Gettelfinger

Map
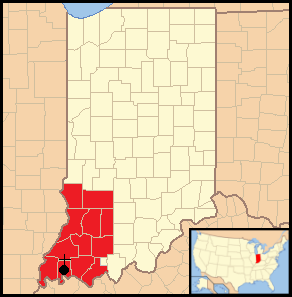
- Map of the Diocese of Evansville

Website
- evdio.org

The Diocese of Evansville (Latin: Dioecesis Evansvicensis) is a diocese of the Catholic Church in Southwestern Indiana in the United States. The mother church of the diocese is St. Benedict Cathedral in Evansville. The diocese was formed in 1944 from what was then the Diocese of Indianapolis. It is part of the Ecclesiastical Province of Indianapolis. The bishop is Joseph M. Siegel.

== Statistics and extent ==
The Diocese of Evansville includes all or part of 12 counties in Southwestern Indiana. While surrounded by the Diocese of Evansville, the territory of St. Meinrad Archabbey is an enclave of the Archdiocese of Indianapolis.

== History ==
=== 1675 to 1900 ===
During the 17th century, present-day Indiana was part of the French colony of New France. The Diocese of Quebec, which had jurisdiction over the colony, sent French missionaries to the region. The first French Jesuit missionaries came to the Vincennes area around 1675.

After the British took control of New France in 1763, the Archdiocese of Quebec retained jurisdiction in the Indiana area. In 1776, the new United States claimed sovereignty over the area of Indiana. In 1787, Indiana became part of the Northwest Territory of the United States.

With the creation of the Diocese of Bardstown in Kentucky in 1810, supervision of the Indiana Territory shifted there. In 1827, the bishop of the Diocese of St. Louis assumed jurisdiction in the new state of Indiana. In 1834, Pope Gregory XVI erected the Diocese of Vincennes, which included both Indiana and Illinois. Pope Pius IX created the Diocese of Fort Wayne in 1857. The Evansville area would remain part of the Diocese of Vincennes, succeeded by the Diocese of Indianapolis, for the next 87 years.

The Daughters of Charity in 1872 founded St. Mary's Hospital in Evansville; it is today St. Mary's Medical Center. In 1882, the Little Sisters of the Poor opened St John's Home for the Aged in Evansville.

=== 1900 to 1950 ===
In 1914, the Sisters of St. Benedict opened the St. Benedict Normal College to train teachers in Ferdinand.

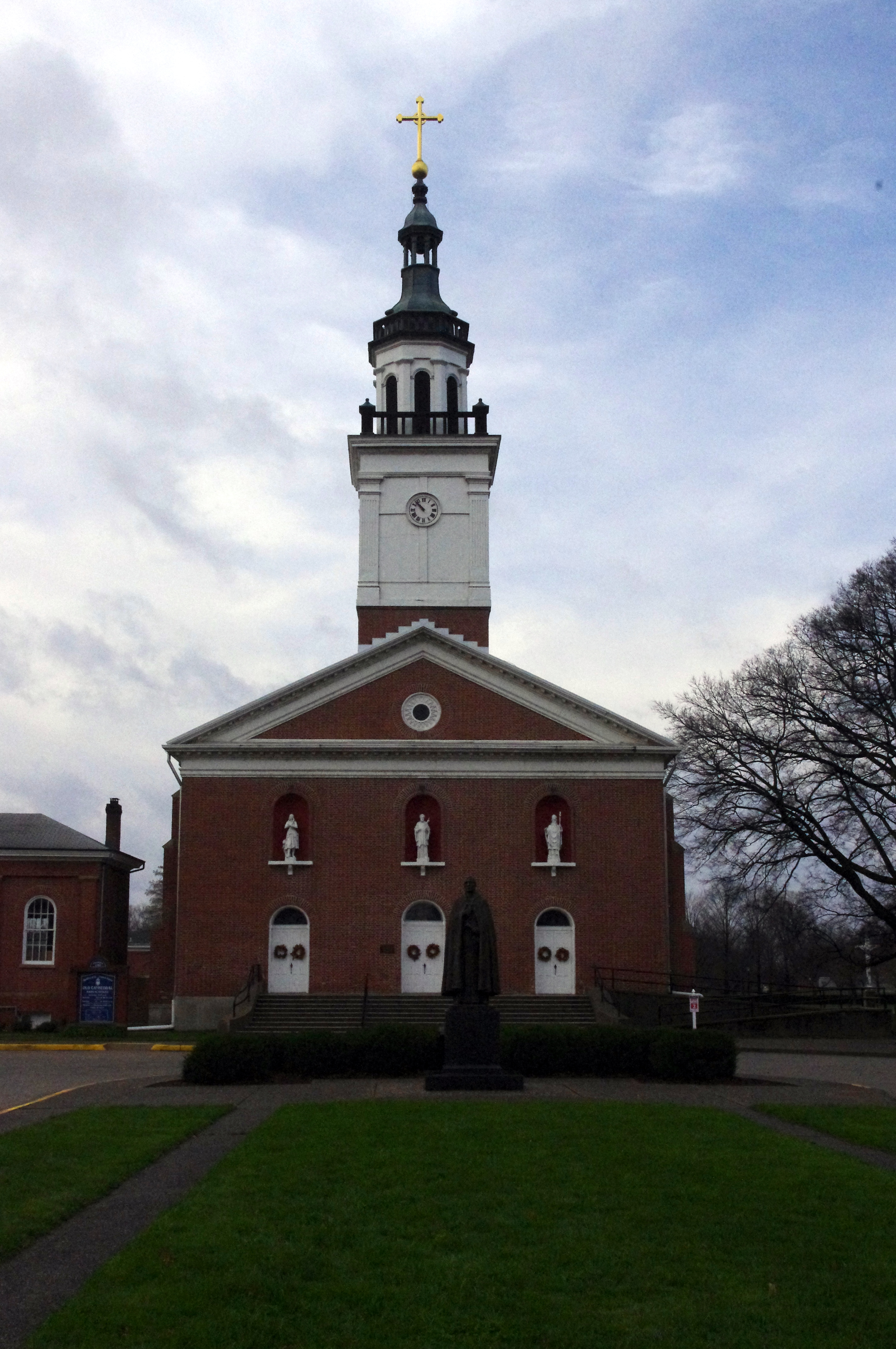
Basilica of St. Francis Xavier (Old Cathedral), Vincennes, Indiana (2011)

Pope Pius XII erected the Diocese of Evansville from the Diocese of Indianapolis on October 21, 1944. The pope named Henry Grimmelsman, rector of the Pontifical College Josephinum in Worthington, Ohio, as its first bishop. Grimmelsman named Assumption Church in Evansville as his cathedral.

At the time of its founding, the diocese included five deaneries, 63 parishes and missions; it had a population of 49,737 Catholics, and 75 diocesan priests. The diocese purchased the John Augustus Reitz Home in Evansville from the Daughters of Isabella for use as the chancery and bishop's residence. In 1948, Grimmelsman conducted the first synod for the diocese.

The diocese grew rapidly after World War II; 12 new parishes were founded between 1944 and 1962 in the Evansville suburbs of Jasper, Fort Branch and Bloomfield. The diocese also elevated mission churches in New Harmony and Oakland City to parishes.Central Catholic High School in Vincennes started classes in 1947. The diocese opened Mater Dei High School in Evansville in 1949.

=== 1950 to 1960 ===
In 1950, the Sisters of the Little Company of Mary opened Memorial Hospital in Jasper. This is today Deaconess Memorial Medical Center. The Daughters of Charity constructed a new hospital facility in Evansville in 1956 for St. Mary's. Rex Mundi High School opened in Evansville in 1958. The diocese constructed the following facilities:

- Magister Noster Latin School, a high school seminary in Evansville
- St. Ferdinand High School in Ferdinand and St. John's High School (1951) in Loogootee

=== 1960 to 1990 ===
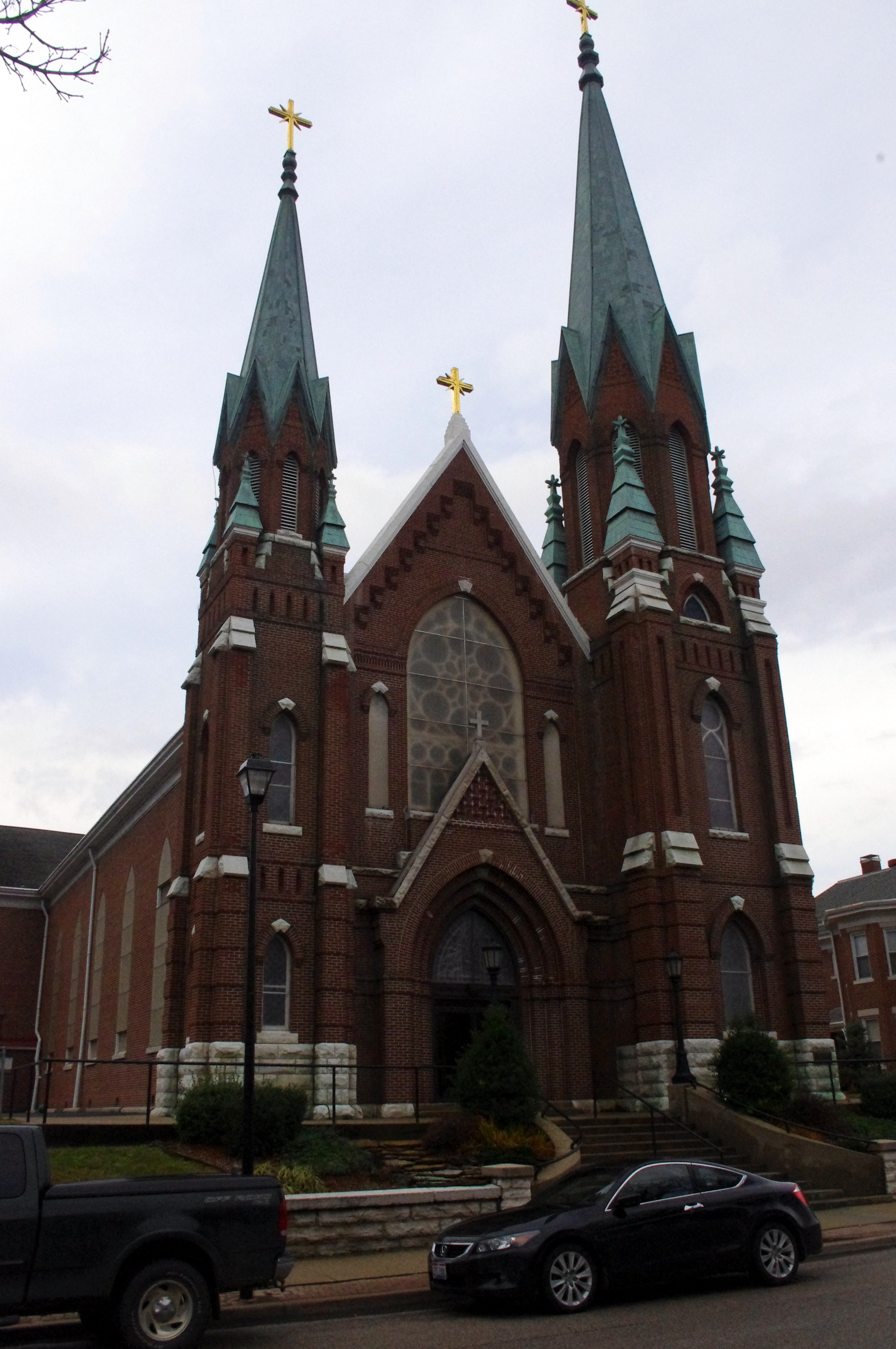
St. John the Baptist Church, Vincennes, Indiana (2011)

The population of downtown Evansville declined in the 1960s, forcing the diocese to close Assumption Cathedral in 1965. Holy Trinity Church, the home of the chancery since 1957, was named the pro-cathedral, for the diocese.

After Grimmelsman retired in 1965, Pope Paul VI appointed Auxiliary Bishop Paul Leibold of the Archdiocese of Cincinnati as the second bishop of Evansville. Three years later in 1969, Paul VI named Leibold as archbishop of Cincinnati. The pope appointed Francis Shea of the Diocese of Nashville as Leibold's replacement in Evansville. Shea constructed a new mission church in Santa Claus, Indiana, in 1967. St. John's High School in Loogootee was destroyed by fire in 1969. The diocese then sold the property to the local school system. The diocese also sold St. Ferdinand High School in the late 1960s.

The diocese also expanded facilities at the St. John Home in Evansville and the Providence Home in Jasper. The Sisters of St. Benedict closed St. Benedict College in 1970. In 1971, the diocese combined Central Catholic High School and St. Rose Academy in Vincennes into the new Jean Francois Rivet High School. Rex Mundi High School was closed in 1972 and Magister Noster Latin School in 1974. The diocese converted Magister Noster into the diocesan chancery.

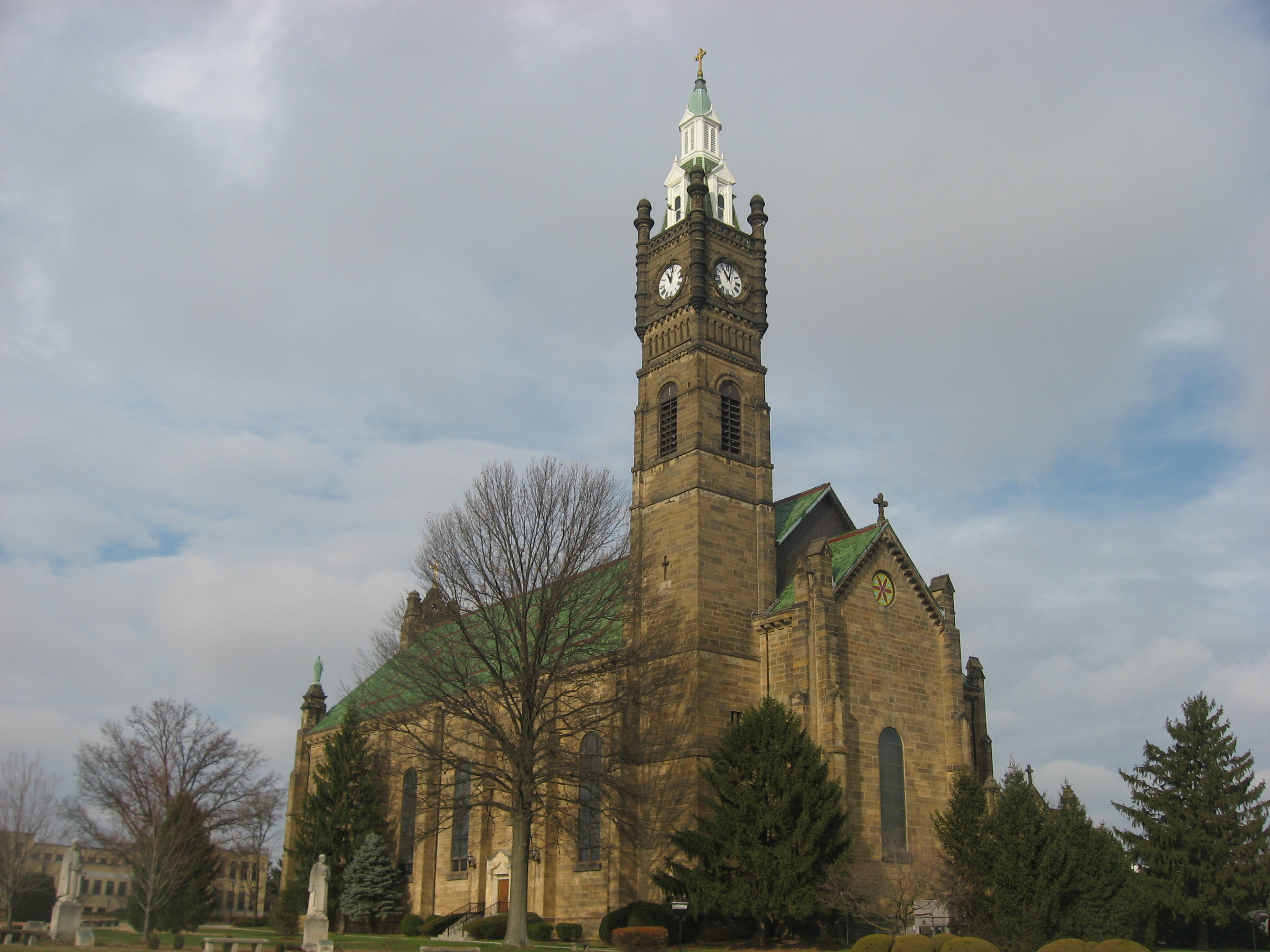
St. Joseph Church, Jasper, Indiana (2011)

When Shea retired in 1989, Pope John Paul II named Gerald Gettelfinger of the Archdiocese of Indianapolis as the next bishop of Evansville.

=== 1990 to 2000 ===
Several parishes built new churches in the 1990s, and the Santa Claus mission became a parish. As the number of priests began to decline and the Catholic population shifted to suburban areas, the diocese in 1997 closed St. Patrick Parish in Corning, St. Mary Parish in Barr Township and St. Michael Parish in Montgomery. The St. Patrick and St. Mary Churches were redesignated as chapels while St. Michael was razed. In 1999, Gettelfinger dedicated St. Benedict Church, the largest in Evansville, as the new cathedral for the diocese.

=== 2000 to 2010 ===
Recognizing the influx of Hispanic Catholics into the diocese, Gettelfinger opened a Hispanic ministry in 2000. Although the number of priests continued to decrease, the diocese began to ordain several large classes of permanent deacons. In 2008, the diocese merged St. Mary and St. Simon Parishes in Washington into Our Lady of Hope Parish, then demolished the St. Mary church.

The diocese began a formal planning process in 2009 to allocate resources for the future. Pope John Paul II High School opened in Jasper in 2009, but closed in 2012 due to low enrollment.

=== 2010 to present ===
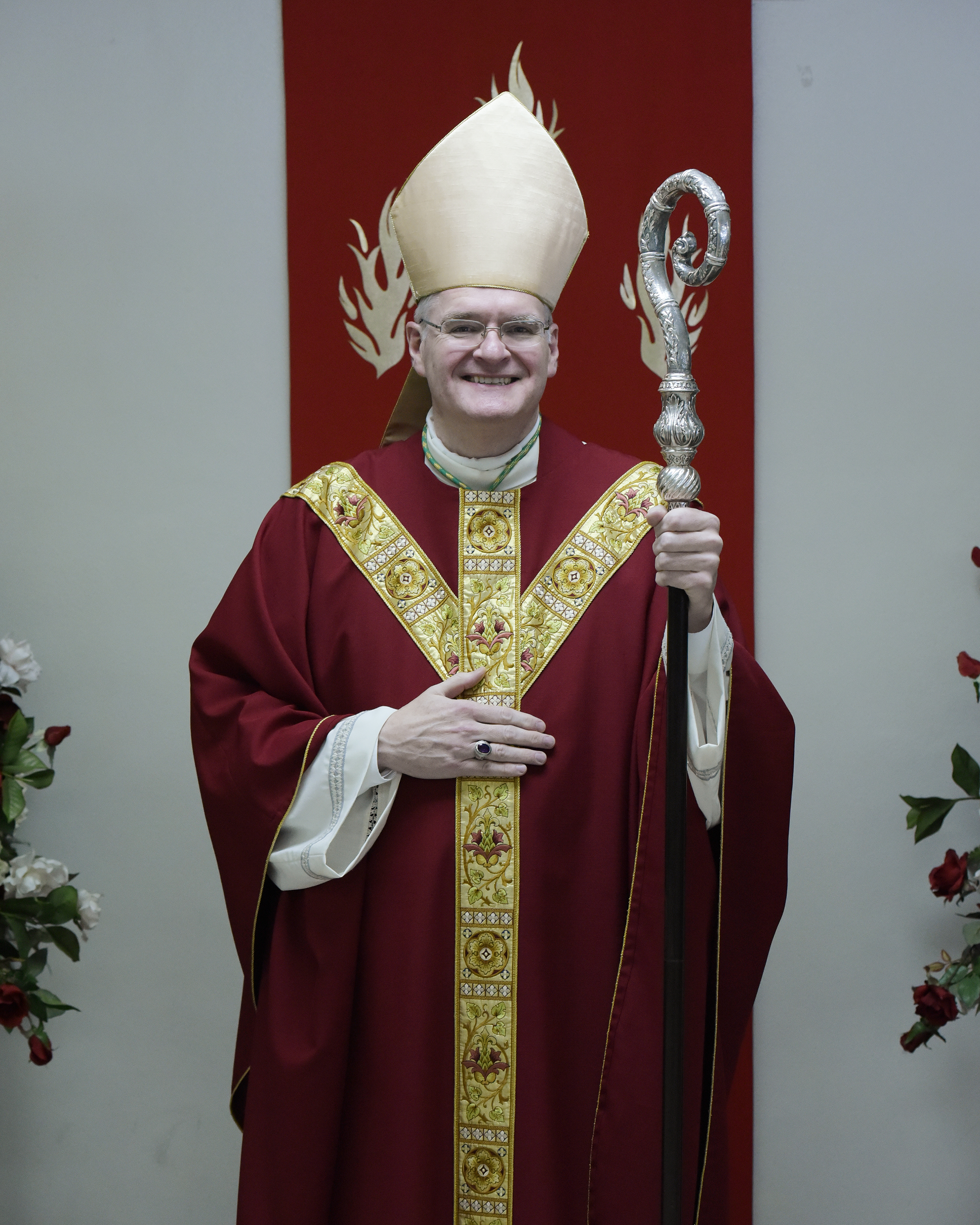
Bishop Siegel (2007)

In 2011, Pope Benedict XVI named Charles C. Thompson of the Archdiocese of Louisville as the fifth bishop of the diocese, replacing Gettelfinger. Emily Herx, a teacher with the diocesan schools, sued the diocese in 2011, stating that it had discriminated against her because she was a woman. The diocese terminated Herx when it learned that she was undergoing in vitro fertilization to become pregnant. A jury awarded Herx $2 million in 2014.

In 2014, Thompson merged 19 parishes into eight parishes. The diocese also prohibited priests from celebrating more that three masses per Sunday, including the Saturday evening vigil. For some churches in the newly merged parishes, it meant no Sunday masses at all. The diocese in 2015 merged seven more parishes into three parishes.

Pope Francis appointed Thompson as archbishop of Indianapolis in 2017 and replaced him in Evansville with Auxiliary Bishop Joseph M. Siegel from the Diocese of Joliet. In 2018, the diocese began renovations of St. Benedict Cathedral. As of 2026, Siegel is the bishop of Evansville.

=== Sex abuse ===
In February 2019, Bishop Siegel released a list of ten clerics in the diocese who faced credible accusations of sexual assault against minors.

Fredy Mendez-Morales had sex with a developmentally disabled young woman at a youth camp run by the diocese in 2007. The priest pleaded guilty, was sentenced to ten years in prison, and was deported after his release. The girl's mother, Silvia Gameros, sued the diocese in 2009, stating that it was negligent in supervising the girl at camp. Gameros and the diocese reached a settlement in 2013.

== Bishops of Evansville ==
1. Henry Joseph Grimmelsmann (1944–1965)
2. Paul Francis Leibold (1966–1969), appointed Archbishop of Cincinnati
3. Francis Raymond Shea (1969–1989)
4. Gerald Andrew Gettelfinger (1989–2011)
5. Charles Coleman Thompson (2011–2017), appointed Archbishop of Indianapolis
6. Joseph M. Siegel (2017–present)

== Education ==
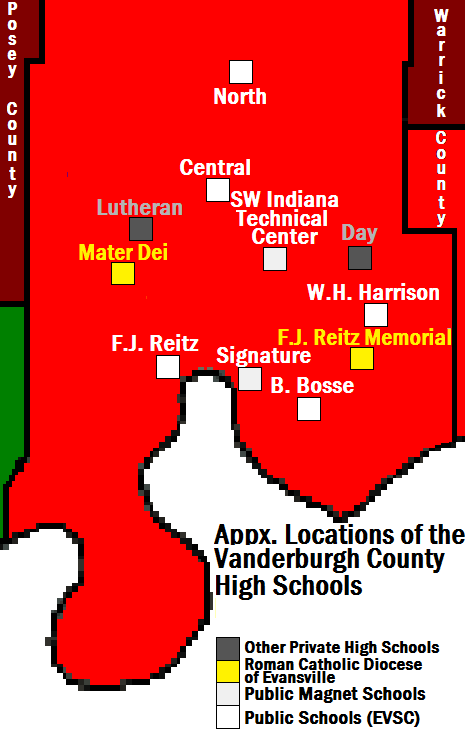
Vanderburgh High School & Charter School Locations RCDE schools are in

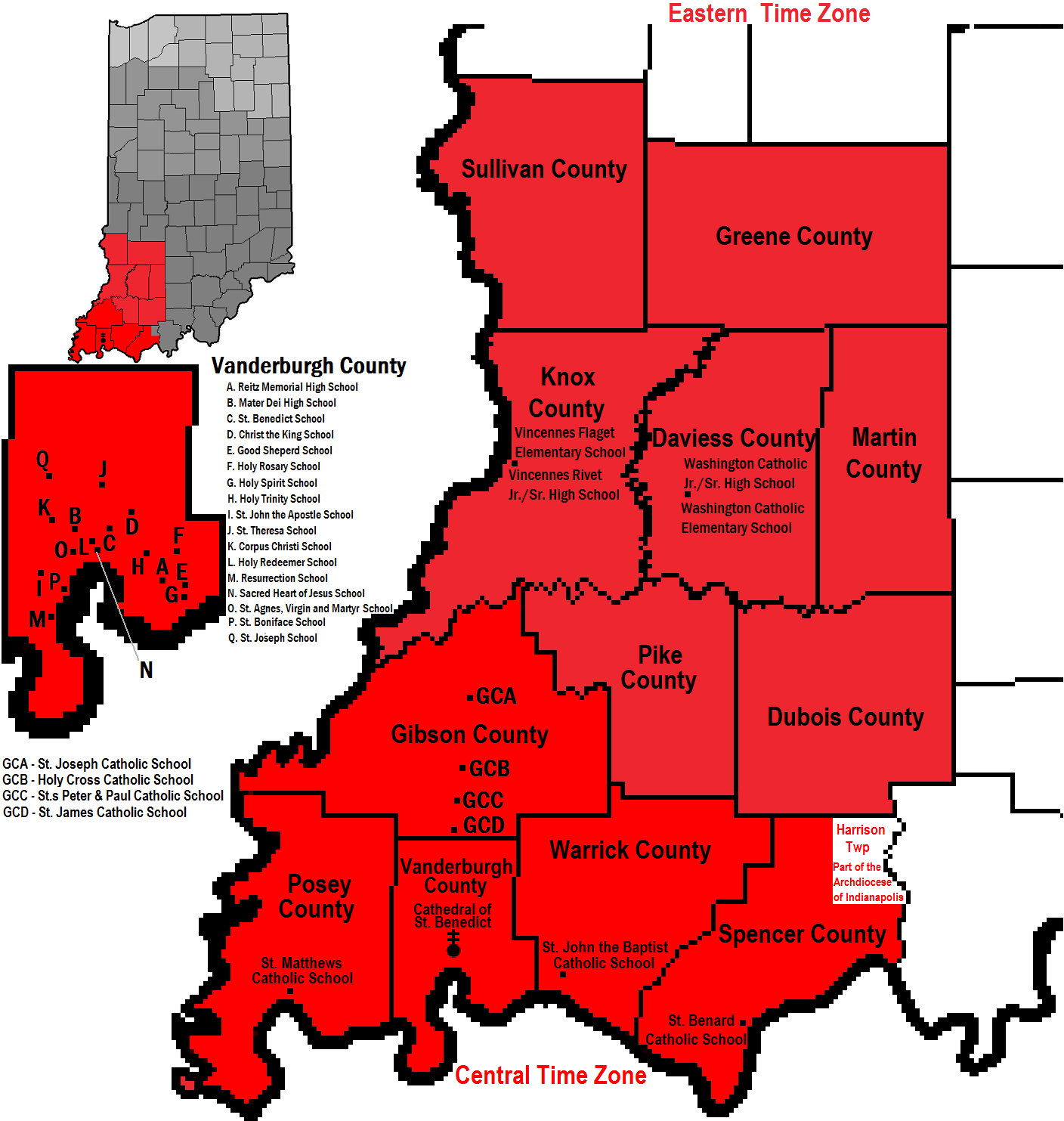
Map of schools in the Diocese of Evansville

As of 2026, the Diocese of Evansvile had four high schools and 22 elementary schools.

=== High schools ===
- Mater Dei High School – Evansville
- Reitz Memorial High School – Evansville
- Rivet Middle and High School – Vincennes
- Washington Catholic Middle/High School – Washington

== Diocesan coat of arms ==
Coat of arms of Diocese of Evansville
Notes The coat of arms for the Diocese of Evansville was designed and adopted when the diocese was erected Adopted 1944 Escutcheon The diocesan arms consists of two blue rivers at the base of a white castle wall with a white crescent moon. Symbolism The wall represents the city of Evansville. The two rivers are the Wabash and Ohio Rivers, which border the diocese. The crescent moon represents Mary, mother of Jesus, the patroness of the diocese.

== Sources and external links ==
- Roman Catholic Diocese of Evansville Official Site
- GCatholic, with Google map - data for most sections
