= Barr Township, Daviess County, Indiana =

Barr Township
- Township
- Location of Barr Township in Daviess County
- Coordinates: 38°40′10″N 87°00′36″W
- Country: United States
- State: Indiana
- County: Daviess

Government
  - Type: Indiana township

Area
  - Total: 73.19 sq mi (189.6 km^{2})
  - Land: 72.05 sq mi (186.6 km^{2})
  - Water: 1.14 sq mi (3.0 km^{2})
- Elevation: 489 ft (149 m)

Population (2020)
  - Total: 5,431
  - Density: 75.38/sq mi (29.10/km^{2})
- FIPS code: 18-03484
- GNIS feature ID: 453096

Barr Township is one of ten townships in Daviess County, Indiana. As of the 2020 census, its population was 5,431 (up from 4,811 at 2010) and it contained 1,649 housing units.

Historical population
Census	Pop.	Note	%±
1890	3,551		—
1900	3,686		3.8%
1910	3,335		−9.5%
1920	3,094		−7.2%
1930	2,668		−13.8%
1940	2,848		6.7%
1950	2,746		−3.6%
1960	2,966		8.0%
1970	3,059		3.1%
1980	3,205		4.8%
1990	3,396		6.0%
2000	4,193		23.5%
2010	4,811		14.7%
2020	5,431		12.9%
Source: US Decennial Census

== History ==
Barr Township was organized on 4 August 1819 from part of Washington Township; its namesake was pioneer settler Hugh Barr. Besides agriculture, which has flourished in its rich soils, the township has depended economically upon coal mining, as some of Indiana's highest quality coal mines are found in Barr Township.

== Geography ==
According to the 2010 census, the township has a total area of 73.19 square miles (189.6 km^{2}), of which 72.05 square miles (186.6 km^{2}) (or 98.44%) is land and 1.14 square miles (3.0 km^{2}) (or 1.56%) is water.

=== Cities and towns ===
- Cannelburg
- Montgomery

=== Unincorporated towns ===
- Black Oak

=== Adjacent townships ===
- Van Buren Township (north)
- Perry Township, Martin County (northeast)
- Rutherford Township, Martin County (southeast)
- Reeve Township (south)
- Harrison Township (southwest)
- Washington Township (west)
- Bogard Township (northwest)

=== Major highways ===
- US 50
- US 150

=== Cemeteries ===
The township cemeteries: Saint Peters, Wagler, and St. Mary's (Barr Township)located on St. Mary's Rd.
