= St. Lawrence Church (Cincinnati) =

Church in Ohio, United States

Coordinates: 39°06′41″N 84°34′22″W

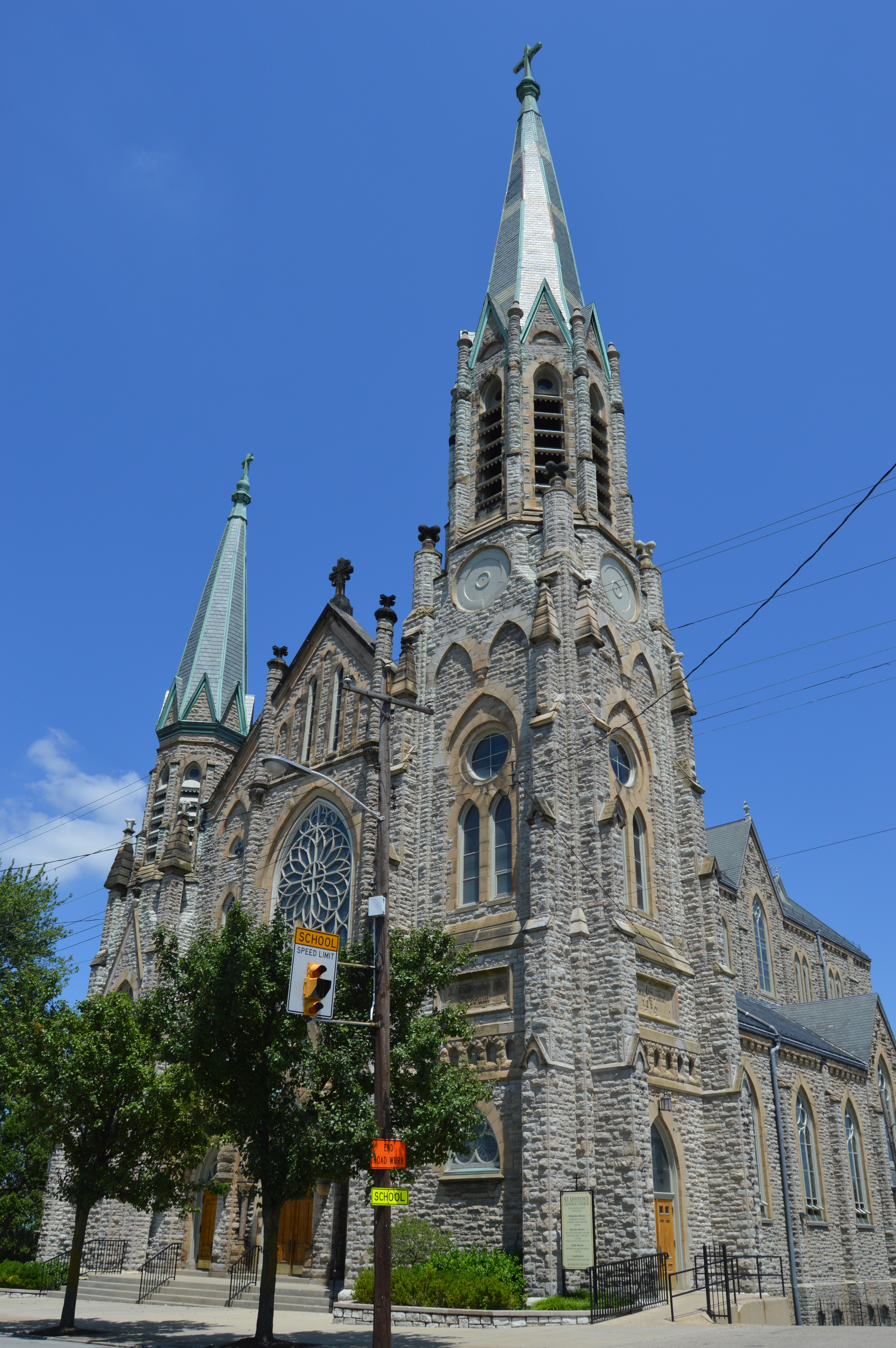
Front and southeastern side

St. Lawrence Church is a Roman Catholic church located at 3680 Warsaw Avenue in Cincinnati, Ohio. It was the first Catholic church in the Cincinnati neighborhood of Price Hill. The church was built on one of the highest hilltops in Cincinnati. The mother parish was St. Michael's in Lower Price Hill.

St Lawrence Church was organized at Mt. St. Mary's Seminary in 1868 under the direction of Rev. J. M. Bonner. A tract of land was purchased and a building erected which was dedicated June 12, 1870. In 1886, work was begun on the present Gothic structure, and the cornerstone was laid October 16, 1886. The basement was dedicated May 22, 1887. The superstructure was completed and the new church dedicated September 30, 1894 by Archbishop William Henry Elder. The new church is 72 × 165 feet and cost $106,000. In 1896, the congregation numbered 475 families.

The church is still operating today along with the elementary school attached. The current pastor is Fr. Zachary Cecil and current school principal is Mrs. Jennifer Long. The school has over 30 faculty members serving preschool through eighth grade.

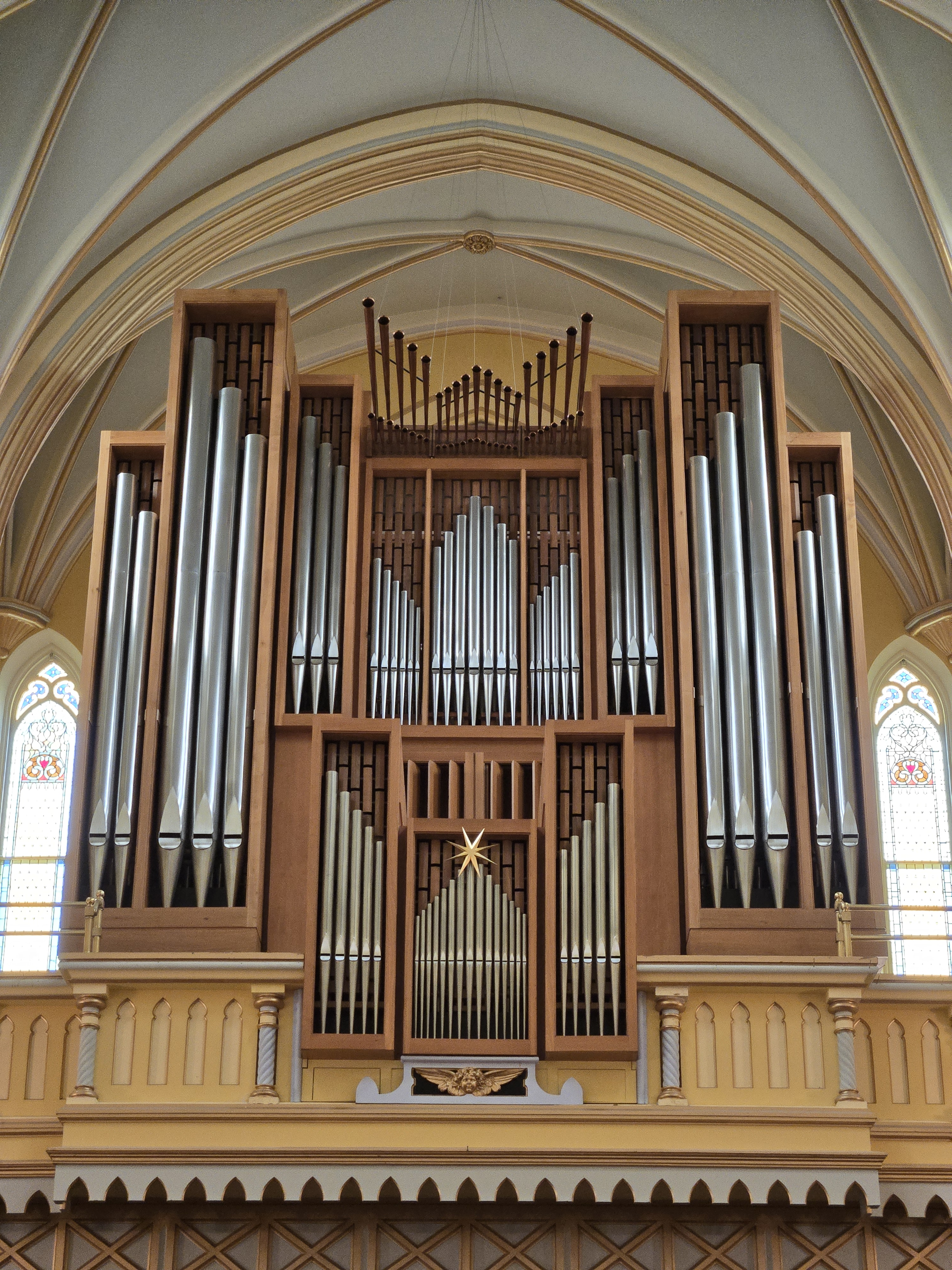
The Beckerath organ installed in 2025

In 2025, the church completed the installation of a new pipe organ by Rudolf von Beckerath Orgelbau, replacing the original historic 1901 instrument from E. and G. G. Hook & Hastings that had fallen into severe disrepair. The Beckerath organ was originally featured in the main organ recital hall at the University of Houston before being sold to St. Lawrence in 2023. Beckerath Orgelbau completed the moving and installation of the instrument in the gallery of the church, where it now servers as the largest pipe organ in the Archdiocese of Cincinnati, featuring nearly 3,500 pipes, and is used at both weekday and weekend Masses.
