= Black Oak, Daviess County, Indiana =

Black Oak
- Unincorporated community
- Location within Indiana Location within the United States
- Coordinates: 38°39′45″N 87°04′52″W
- Country: United States
- State: Indiana
- County: Daviess
- Township: Barr
- Elevation: 518 ft (158 m)
- ZIP code: 47558
- FIPS code: 18-05600
- GNIS feature ID: 431138

Black Oak is a small unincorporated community in Barr Township, Daviess County, Indiana.

It was named for the presence of black oak trees.
