= Francis Raymond Shea =

American prelate

His Excellency, The Most Reverend Francis Raymond Shea
- Bishop of Evansville
- Church: Roman Catholic
- See: Diocese of Evansville
- In office: February 3, 1970; March 11, 1989
- Predecessor: Paul Francis Leibold
- Successor: Gerald Andrew Gettelfinger

Orders
- Ordination: March 19, 1939 by Ralph Leo Hayes
- Consecration: February 3, 1970 by Luigi Raimondi

Personal details
- Born: December 4, 1913 Knoxville, Tennessee, USA
- Died: August 18, 1994 (aged 80)
- Denomination: Roman Catholic
- Motto: Benedicamus Domino (Let us bless the Lord)

Francis Raymond Shea was an American prelate of the Roman Catholic Church. He served as the third bishop of the Diocese of Evansville in Indiana from 1969 to 1989.

== Biography ==
=== Early life ===
Francis Shea was born in Knoxville, Tennessee on December 4, 1913. He was ordained a priest in Rome for the Diocese of Nashville on March 19, 1939, in Rome by Bishop Ralph Hayes. Shea served several assignments around Tennessee over the next three decades. The Vatican elevated Shea to the rank of monsignor in 1967.

=== Bishop of Evansville ===
On December 1, 1969, Shea was appointed bishop of Evansville by Pope Paul VI. Shea was consecrated at St. Benedict Church in Evansville, Indiana, by Cardinal Luigi Raimondi on February 3, 1970.Pope John Paul II accepted Shea's resignation as bishop of Evansville on March 11, 1989. Francis Shea died on August 18, 1994.

Catholic Church titles
Preceded by Paul Francis Leibold	Bishop of Evansville; 1969 – 1989	Succeeded by Gerald Andrew Gettelfinger
