= Montgomery, Indiana =

- Town
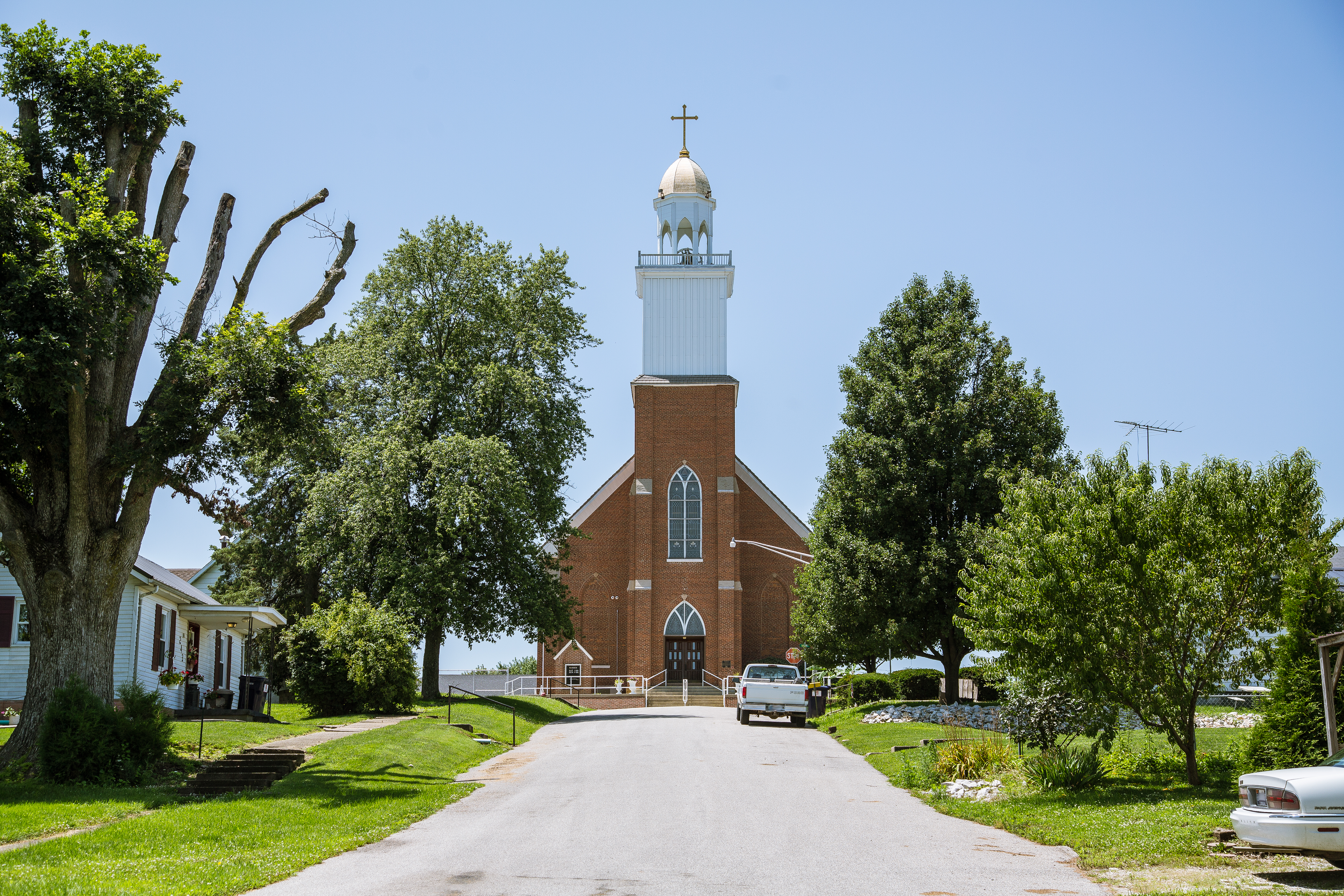

- Logo

- Location of Montgomery in Daviess County, Indiana.
- Coordinates: 38°39′56″N 87°02′58″W
- Country: United States
- State: Indiana
- County: Daviess
- Township: Barr
- Named after: Montgomery, Wales

Area
  - Total: 1.66 sq mi (4.31 km^{2})
  - Land: 1.62 sq mi (4.19 km^{2})
  - Water: 0.046 sq mi (0.12 km^{2})
- Elevation: 525 ft (160 m)

Population (2020)
  - Total: 792
  - Density: 490/sq mi (189.2/km^{2})
- Time zone: UTC-5 (Eastern(EST))
  - Summer (DST): UTC-4 (EDT)
- ZIP code: 47558
- Area code: 812
- FIPS code: 18-50688
- GNIS feature ID: 2396777
- Website: montgomeryindiana.net

Montgomery is a town in Barr Township, Daviess County, Indiana, United States. The population was 792 at the 2020 census.

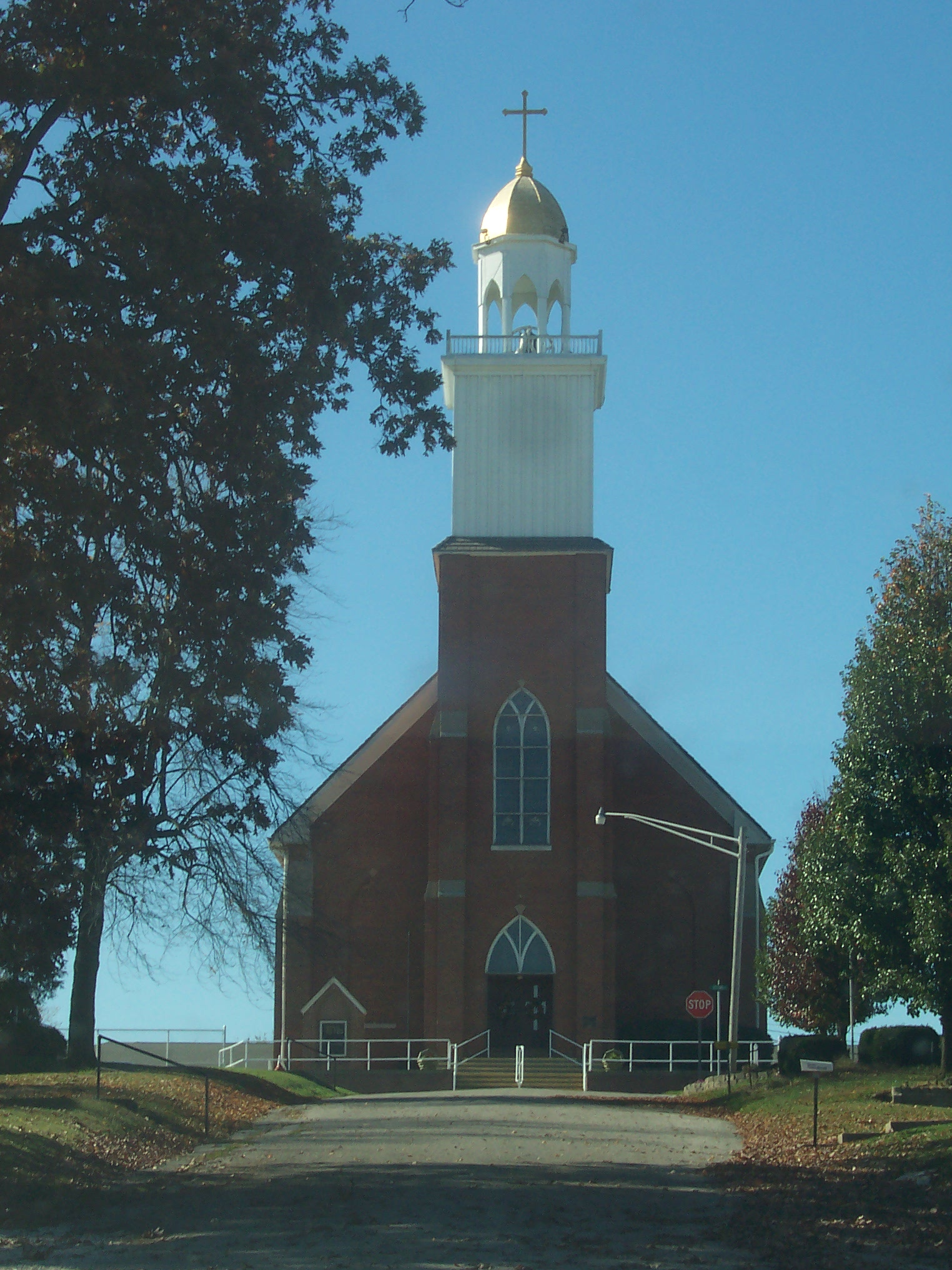
Catholic Church of Montgomery

== History ==
Montgomery was laid out in 1865 by Valentine B. Montgomery. Montgomery was a station and shipping point on the Ohio and Mississippi Railway.

St Peter's church is the second oldest Catholic parishes in Indiana. The first church was a log-cabin built in 1818, followed by frame church in 1823. In 1841, bishop Célestine Guynemer de la Hailandière gave the parish and the land to French priest and missionary Edward Sorin, CSC who came with seven Brothers of the Congregation of Holy Cross. At the time the property consisted in 160-acre tract of land, the frame church with two additional small rooms, and two log cabins. One cabin was used as a school conducted by Charles Rother who took the name Brother Joseph. In the early months of 1842, Sorin started to conceive the idea of founding a college, although one was already present in Vincennes (the College of St. Gabriel, which failed soon after). Sorin thought of founding the college there in St Peters, but he met the opposition of the bishop who lamented that this was not in the original plans and it conflicted with the existence of St. Gabriel's college. However, the bishops also stated that he was not against a founding of a college elsewhere, provided that this effort would not prevent him his Brothers from accomplishing their education duties. Near the end of October the bishop offered Sorin certain lands at the furthermost limits of the diocese in South Bend. Sorin left St. Peters and proceeded to found the University of Notre Dame.

== Geography ==
According to the 2010 census, Montgomery has a total area of 0.24 square miles (0.62 km^{2}), all land.

== Demographics ==
Historical population
| Census | Pop. | Note | %± |
|---|---|---|---|
| 1870 | 135 | | — |
| 1880 | 155 | | 14.8% |
| 1890 | 415 | | 167.7% |
| 1900 | 616 | | 48.4% |
| 1910 | 511 | | −17.0% |
| 1920 | 576 | | 12.7% |
| 1930 | 445 | | −22.7% |
| 1940 | 510 | | 14.6% |
| 1950 | 538 | | 5.5% |
| 1960 | 446 | | −17.1% |
| 1970 | 411 | | −7.8% |
| 1980 | 390 | | −5.1% |
| 1990 | 351 | | −10.0% |
| 2000 | 368 | | 4.8% |
| 2010 | 343 | | −6.8% |
| 2020 | 792 | | 130.9% |
U.S. Decennial Census

=== 2010 census ===
As of the census of 2010, there were 343 people, 137 households, and 95 families living in the town. The population density was 1,429.2 inhabitants per square mile (551.8/km^{2}). There were 157 housing units at an average density of 654.2 per square mile (252.6/km^{2}). The racial makeup of the town was 99.4% White and 0.6% from two or more races. Hispanic or Latino of any race were 0.6% of the population.

There were 137 households, of which 34.3% had children under the age of 18 living with them, 55.5% were married couples living together, 8.0% had a female householder with no husband present, 5.8% had a male householder with no wife present, and 30.7% were non-families. 27.0% of all households were made up of individuals, and 14.6% had someone living alone who was 65 years of age or older. The average household size was 2.50 and the average family size was 3.06.

The median age in the town was 36.6 years. 25.4% of residents were under the age of 18; 7.8% were between the ages of 18 and 24; 26.3% were from 25 to 44; 29.3% were from 45 to 64; and 11.1% were 65 years of age or older. The gender makeup of the town was 50.4% male and 49.6% female.

=== 2000 census ===
As of the census of 2000, there were 368 people, 140 households, and 100 families living in the town. The population density was 1,527.7 inhabitants per square mile (589.8/km^{2}). There were 153 housing units at an average density of 635.1 per square mile (245.2/km^{2}). The racial makeup of the town was 99.18% White, 0.27% African American, 0.27% Native American, and 0.27% from two or more races. Hispanic or Latino of any race were 0.82% of the population.

There were 140 households, out of which 35.0% had children under the age of 18 living with them, 57.9% were married couples living together, 10.7% had a female householder with no husband present, and 27.9% were non-families. 23.6% of all households were made up of individuals, and 10.7% had someone living alone who was 65 years of age or older. The average household size was 2.61 and the average family size was 3.11.

In the town, the population was spread out, with 25.8% under the age of 18, 10.1% from 18 to 24, 31.8% from 25 to 44, 19.6% from 45 to 64, and 12.8% who were 65 years of age or older. The median age was 34 years. For every 100 females, there were 101.1 males. For every 100 females age 18 and over, there were 96.4 males.

The median income for a household in the town was $36,944, and the median income for a family was $44,205. Males had a median income of $29,107 versus $17,206 for females. The per capita income for the town was $15,156. About 5.8% of families and 10.8% of the population were below the poverty line, including 13.6% of those under age 18 and 14.9% of those age 65 or over.

== Gasthof Village ==
The town has a sizable Amish population. Local Catholics run the Gasthof Amish Village. The village features various shops offering furniture, blankets, and other handmade goods created by the Amish.

== Notable people ==
- Harry Endicott Indy car driver
- Bill Endicott Indy car driver
