= National Register of Historic Places listings in Daviess County, Indiana =

Location of Daviess County in Indiana

This is a list of the National Register of Historic Places listings in Daviess County, Indiana.

This is intended to be a complete list of the properties and districts on the National Register of Historic Places in Daviess County, Indiana, United States. Latitude and longitude coordinates are provided for many National Register properties and districts; these locations may be seen together in a map.

There are 14 properties and districts listed on the National Register in the county.

Properties and districts located in incorporated areas display the name of the municipality, while properties and districts in unincorporated areas display the name of their civil township. Properties and districts split between multiple jurisdictions display the names of all jurisdictions.

This National Park Service list is complete through NPS recent listings posted February 27, 2026.

== Current listings ==
Beulah A. M. E. Church & Dunbar School, 807 & 809 W. Walnut Street., Washington, SG100012760, LISTED, 3/2/2026

	Name on the Register	Image	Date listed	Location	City or town	Description
1	Beulah A. M. E. Church & Dunbar School		March 2, 2026 (#100012760)	807 & 809 W. Walnut Street; 38°39′31″N 87°11′10″W	Washington	
2	Magnus J. Carnahan House	Magnus J. Carnahan House	August 29, 1991 (#91001167)	511 E. Main St. 38°39′23″N 87°10′11″W	Washington	
3	County Bridge No. 45	County Bridge No. 45	September 20, 2006 (#06000856)	Carries County Road 150N over the White River, northeast of Wheatland; 38°40′47″N 87°16′20″W	Washington Township	Extends into Knox County
4	Daviess County Courthouse	Daviess County Courthouse	September 17, 2008 (#08000916)	200 E. Walnut St. 38°39′32″N 87°10′22″W	Washington	
5	Thomas Faith House	Thomas Faith House	March 28, 1994 (#94000227)	1208 Bedford Rd. 38°39′38″N 87°09′40″W	Washington	
6	Glendale Ridge Archaeological Site (12 Da 86)	Glendale Ridge Archaeological Site (12 Da 86)	May 30, 1985 (#85001165)	Address Restricted	Harrison Township	
7	Robert C. Graham House	Robert C. Graham House	March 16, 1983 (#83000120)	101 W. Maple St. 38°39′43″N 87°10′42″W	Washington	
8	Jefferson Elementary School	Jefferson Elementary School	June 20, 1997 (#97000597)	381 W 150 S 38°38′03″N 87°10′22″W	Washington Township	
9	McCall Family Farmstead	McCall Family Farmstead	September 18, 2013 (#13000721)	4914 E800N, southeast of Plainville; 38°46′22″N 87°04′32″W	Bogard Township	
10	Old Union Church and Cemetery	Old Union Church and Cemetery	June 17, 2005 (#05000605)	1125E, approximately 3/8 miles south of its junction with 700S, south of Alfordsville; 38°32′56″N 86°57′22″W	Reeve Township	
11	Prairie Creek Site	Prairie Creek Site	May 12, 1975 (#75000013)	Southeastern bank of Prairie Creek, 1.5 kilometres (0.93 mi) below the western edge of the Thousand Acre Woods and north of Washington; 38°43′04″N 87°09′55″W	Washington Township	
12	Dr. John A. Scudder House	Dr. John A. Scudder House	September 14, 1995 (#95001104)	612 E. Main St. 38°39′26″N 87°10′05″W	Washington	
13	Washington Commercial Historic District	Washington Commercial Historic District	November 28, 1990 (#90001780)	Roughly bounded by 4th, Hefron, and Meridian Sts. and the CSX railroad line 38°39′27″N 87°10′22″W	Washington	
14	Dr. Nelson Wilson House	Dr. Nelson Wilson House	June 26, 2008 (#08000566)	103 E. National Highway; 38°39′09″N 87°10′29″W	Washington	

== See also ==
- List of National Historic Landmarks in Indiana
- National Register of Historic Places listings in Indiana
- Listings in neighboring counties: Dubois, Greene, Knox, Martin, Pike
- List of Indiana state historical markers in Daviess County
