= List of Indiana state historical markers in Daviess County =

Location of Daviess County in Indiana

This is a list of the Indiana state historical markers in Daviess County.

This is intended to be a complete list of the official state historical markers placed in Daviess County, Indiana, United States by the Indiana Historical Bureau. The locations of the historical markers and their latitude and longitude coordinates are included below when available, along with their names, years of placement, and topics as recorded by the Historical Bureau. There are 10 historical markers located in Daviess County.

== Historical markers ==
Marker title	Image	Year placed	Location	Topics
Vincennes Donation Lands		1966	Intersection of the U.S. Route 50 bypass and State Road 57, in a grassy median between a restaurant and a motel at 7 Cumberland Drive in Washington; 38°37′52″N 87°10′37.3″W	Early Settlement and Exploration, Immigration and Ethnic Groups
Mimi's House		1989	101 W. Maple and NW 1st Streets in Washington; 38°39′43″N 87°10′42″W	Business, Industry, and Labor, Buildings and Architecture
Robert C. Graham		1989	Maysville Road exit, north of the U.S. Routes 50/150 bypass, on the east side of Maysville Road/County Road 300W, 2 miles west of Washington; 38°38′38″N 87°13′19″W	Business, Industry, and Labor, Agriculture
Odon, Formerly Clarksburg		1991	Northern side of State Road 58 near John Street on the eastern edge of Odon; 38°50′41″N 86°59′0″W	Historic District, Neighborhoods, and Towns
Baltimore and Ohio Southwestern Railroad Depot		1992	1 Train Depot and Meridian Streets in Washington; 38°39′20″N 87°10′31″W	Transportation, Buildings and Architecture
Burial Site of Captain Eli McCarty		1993	United Methodist Ebenezer Cemetery, on the eastern side of State Road 257 at its junction with County Road 725S, 6 miles south of Washington; 38°33′2″N 87°6′33″W	Military
Indiana's Early Bird Pilot		1997	Daviess County Airport, along Sugarland Road northeast of Washington; 38°41′44″N 87°7′51″W	Transportation, Politics
Fort Flora		1999	Southwestern corner of the junction of E. Main and NE. 2nd Streets in Washington; 38°39′24.5″N 87°10′24.5″W	Military, Early Settlement and Exploration
Homer E. Capehart / GOP Cornfield Conference		1999	Junction of County Roads 600N and 150W on the southwestern side of the railroad tracks, 1.5 miles west of State Road 57 and about 6 miles northwest of Washington; 38°44′45″N 87°11′43.4″W	Politics, Special Events
Wabash and Erie Canal		2007	Junction of State Roads 58 and 57 in Elnora; 38°52′30″N 87°5′26″W	Business, Industry, and Labor, Transportation

== See also ==
- List of Indiana state historical markers
- National Register of Historic Places listings in Daviess County, Indiana
