= South Washington, Indiana =

South Washington
- Unincorporated community
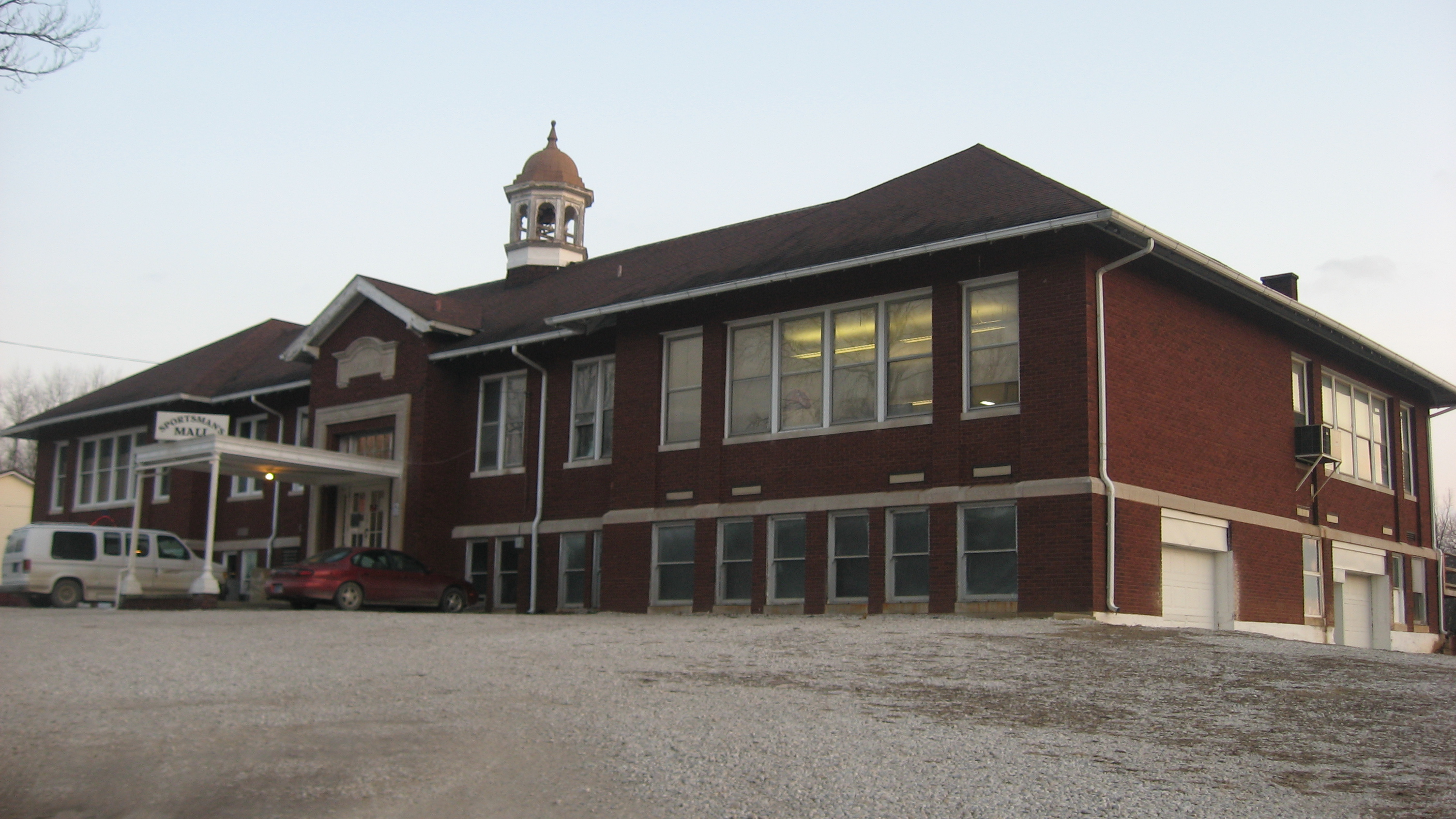
- The historic Jefferson Elementary in South Washington

- Location within Indiana Location within the United States
- Coordinates: 38°38′05″N 87°10′43″W
- Country: United States
- State: Indiana
- County: Daviess
- Township: Washington
- Elevation: 482 ft (147 m)
- ZIP code: 47501
- FIPS code: 18-71576
- GNIS feature ID: 443867

South Washington is an unincorporated community in Washington Township, Daviess County, Indiana.

== History ==
South Washington was laid out in 1874 as a mining town. It is south of Washington, hence the name. It was also known as "Lick Skillet" by its French population who were miners.
