= John Gaddis =

John Gaddis may refer to:

- John Gaddi, one of the leaders of the Maccabeans in the First Book of Maccabees
- John Lewis Gaddis, American historian
- John W. Gaddis, architect of Vincennes, Indiana
