= Washington Township, Daviess County, Indiana =

Washington Township
- Township
- Location of Washington Township in Daviess County
- Coordinates: 38°40′10″N 87°10′33″W
- Country: United States
- State: Indiana
- County: Daviess

Government
  - Type: Indiana township

Area
  - Total: 73.77 sq mi (191.1 km^{2})
  - Land: 73.08 sq mi (189.3 km^{2})
  - Water: 0.69 sq mi (1.8 km^{2})
- Elevation: 509 ft (155 m)

Population (2020)
  - Total: 16,054
  - Density: 219.7/sq mi (84.82/km^{2})
- FIPS code: 18-80522
- GNIS feature ID: 453990

Washington Township is one of ten townships in Daviess County, Indiana. As of the 2020 census, its population was 16,054 (up from 15,534 at 2010) and it contained 6,811 housing units.

Historical population
Census	Pop.	Note	%±
1890	9,712		—
1900	11,994		23.5%
1910	11,404		−4.9%
1920	12,334		8.2%
1930	13,103		6.2%
1940	13,275		1.3%
1950	14,284		7.6%
1960	14,497		1.5%
1970	14,723		1.6%
1980	15,208		3.3%
1990	14,716		−3.2%
2000	15,110		2.7%
2010	15,534		2.8%
2020	16,054		3.3%
Source: US Decennial Census

== History ==
Washington Township was organized on 12 May 1817 at the first meeting of the Daviess County Commissioners. Among its earliest settlements was the community of Liverpool, which later became subsumed into the county seat of Washington, which is located in Washington Township.

County Bridge No. 45, Jefferson Elementary School, and Prairie Creek Site are listed on the National Register of Historic Places.

== Geography ==
According to the 2010 census, the township has a total area of 73.77 square miles (191.1 km^{2}), of which 73.08 square miles (189.3 km^{2}) (or 99.06%) is land and 0.69 square miles (1.8 km^{2}) (or 0.94%) is water. Blue Hole Pond, Snyder Pond and Swan Pond are in this township.

=== Cities and towns ===
- Washington

=== Unincorporated towns ===
- Graham
- Lettsville
- Maysville
- South Washington

=== Adjacent townships ===
- Steele Township (north)
- Vigo Township, Knox County (north)
- Bogard Township (northeast)
- Barr Township (east)
- Harrison Township (southeast)
- Veale Township (south)
- Harrison Township, Knox County (southwest)
- Steen Township, Knox County (west)

=== Major highways ===
- I-69
- US 50
- US 150
- SR 57
- SR 257

=== Cemeteries ===
The township contains five cemeteries: Colbert, Hawkins, New Veale Creek, Oak Grove and Saint Johns.
