= Maysville, Indiana =

Maysville
- Unincorporated town
- Location within Indiana Location within the United States
- Coordinates: 38°38′52″N 87°13′42″W
- Country: United States
- State: Indiana
- County: Daviess
- Township: Washington
- Elevation: 440 ft (130 m)
- ZIP code: 47501
- FIPS code: 18-47844
- GNIS feature ID: 438767

Maysville was an unincorporated town in Washington Township, Daviess County, Indiana. It was laid out in 1834 on the Wabash and Erie Canal, but disappeared when the canal ceased operations.
