= Olney Carnegie Library =

- U.S. National Register of Historic Places
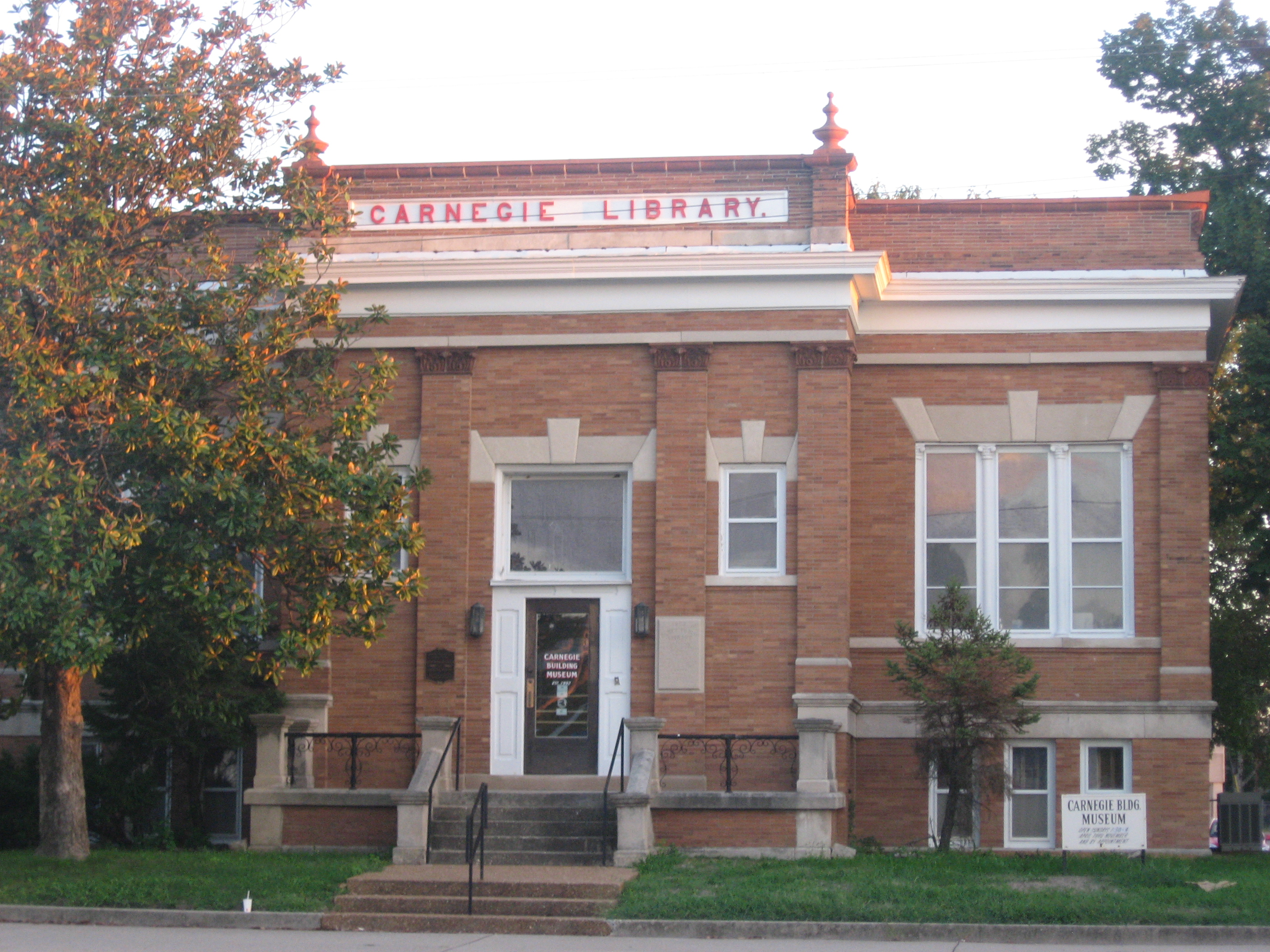

- Location within Illinois Location within the United States
- Location: 401 E. Main St., Olney, Illinois
- Coordinates: 38°43′52″N 88°4′53″W
- Area: less than one acre
- Built: 1904
- Built by: Robards, B.L.
- Architect: John W. Gaddis
- Architectural style: Classical Revival
- MPS: Illinois Carnegie Libraries MPS
- NRHP reference No.: 02000037
- Added to NRHP: February 14, 2002

The Olney Carnegie Library is a Carnegie library located at 401 E. Main St. in Olney, Illinois. Olney's library association was founded in 1882, but the city did not have its own library building until the Carnegie Library was constructed in 1904. The library was designed in the Classical Revival style by John W. Gaddis; it is the only Classical Revival building in Olney. Its design features brick pilasters with Corinthian capitals, two terra cotta finials atop the roof, and leaded-glass windows with keystone-patterned stone lintels. The library served as Olney's main library until 1990 and is now the Carnegie Museum.

The building was added to the National Register of Historic Places on February 14, 2002.
