= Pineville Courthouse Square Historic District =

Historic district in Kentucky, United States

- U.S. National Register of Historic Places
- U.S. Historic district
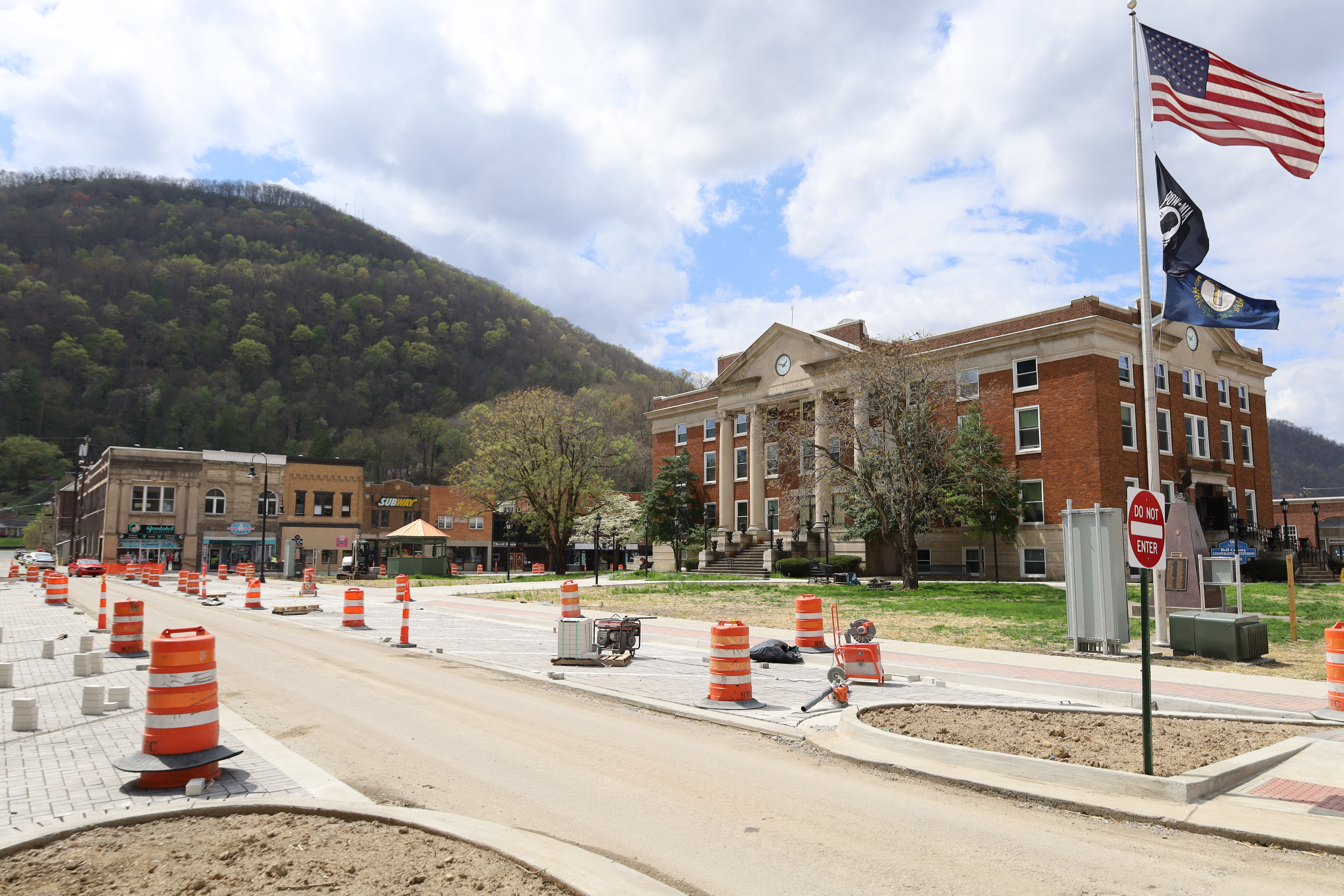
- The Bell County Courthouse square and adjacent buildings in 2025

- Location within Kentucky Location within the United States
- Location: Along Kentucky, Pine, Virginia, and Walnut Sts., Pineville, Kentucky
- Coordinates: 36°45′41″N 83°41′44″W
- Area: 7 acres (2.8 ha)
- Architect: Gaddis, John W.
- Architectural style: Late 19th And 20th Century Revivals, Classical Revival, Romanesque
- NRHP reference No.: 90001019
- Added to NRHP: July 19, 1990

The Pineville Courthouse Square Historic District is a 7-acre (2.8 ha) historic district in Pineville, Kentucky that is listed on the U.S. National Register of Historic Places. It includes the Bell County Courthouse and related government buildings and the central business core of the town.

The original courthouse square was laid out in 1888. The original courthouse (no longer extant) of Bell County, Kentucky was built in 1894. The current courthouse, with a pedimented Ionic portico, was designed by architect John W. Gaddis of Vincennes, Indiana in 1919. The courthouse was renovated extensively in 1978.

The district includes what was the only 4-story building in Pineville as of 1988, the 1921-built Pineville Furniture Store building. Next door to that is a George Mesker-designed commercial building with "corbelled cream-colored brickwork."

It includes an "impressive" Masonic Temple building built in 1921 that has a three-story brick facade "ornamented with what resembles a proscenium arch of stone supported by a pair of engaged Egyptian pilasters." A brick parapet "is raised in the center to form a shallow pediment above an inscription identifying the building, and a central stone panel contains an emblem of the winged sun disk."

It was listed on the NRHP in 1990.

The district includes 35 properties, including 26 contributing and four non-contributing buildings.
