= Washington Commercial Historic District (Washington, Indiana) =

Historic district in Indiana, United States

- U.S. National Register of Historic Places
- U.S. Historic district
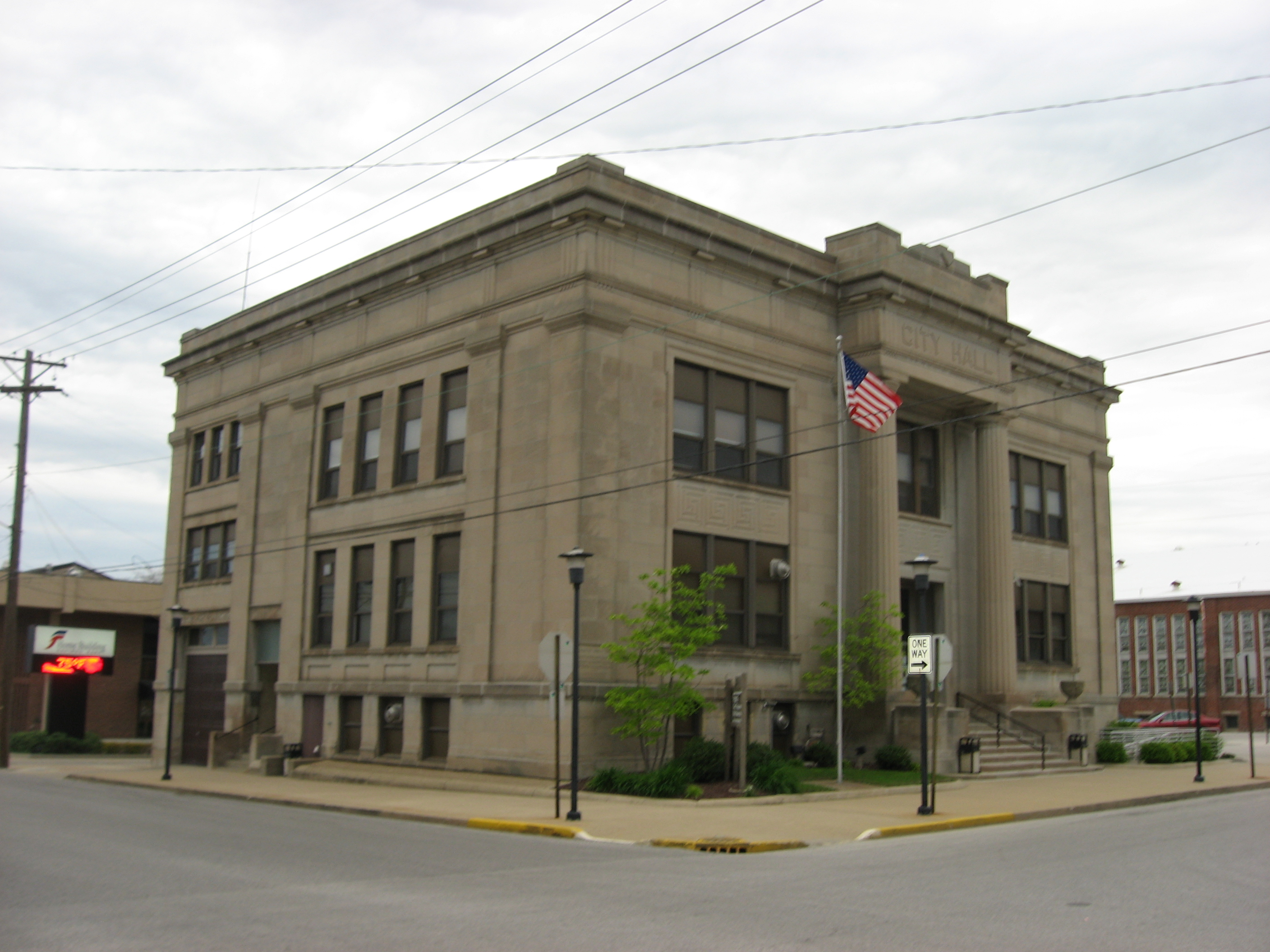
- City Hall, April 2011

- Location within Indiana Location within the United States
- Location: Roughly bounded by Fourth, Hefron and Meridian Sts. and the Chessie System RR, Washington, Indiana
- Coordinates: 38°39′27″N 87°10′22″W
- Area: 22 acres (8.9 ha)
- Architect: Multiple
- Architectural style: Classical Revival, Italianate, Federal
- NRHP reference No.: 90001780
- Added to NRHP: November 28, 1990

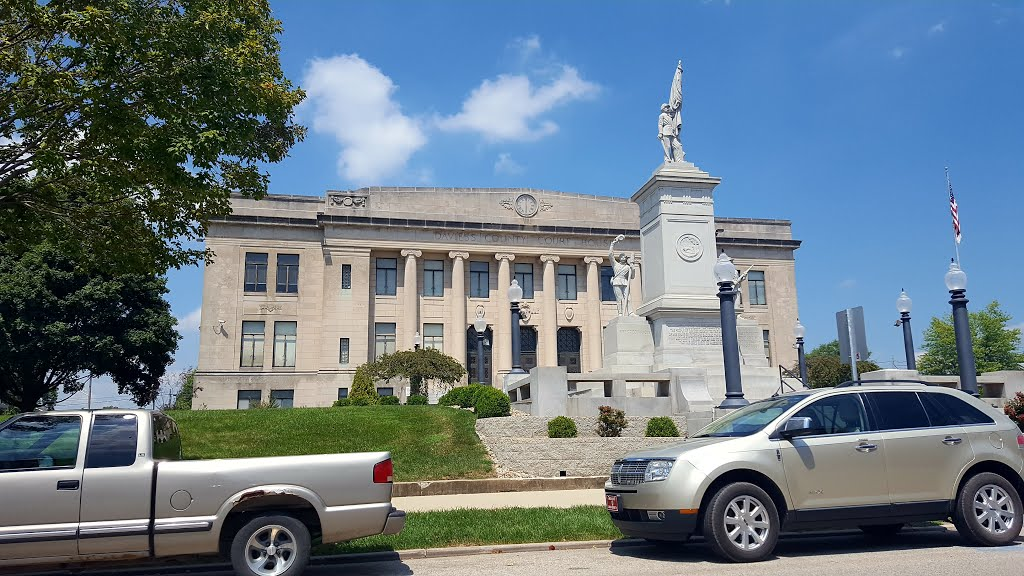
Daviess County Courthouse - 2016

Washington Commercial Historic District is a national historic district located at Washington, Indiana. The district encompasses 88 contributing buildings and 1 contributing object in the central business district of Washington. The district was developed roughly between 1815 and 1940, and includes notable examples of Italianate, Federal, and Classical Revival style architecture. Located in the district is the separately listed Daviess County Courthouse. Other notable buildings include the City Hall (1916), Temple Court (1894), Peoples National Bank (1928), Masonic Building (1868, 1888), Indiana Theater (c. 1925), American Steam Laundry Building (c. 1930), Baltimore and Ohio Passenger Depot (1906), Westminster Presbyterian Church (1911), and U.S. Post Office (1916).

It was added to the National Register of Historic Places in 1990.
