= Washington Transit System =

Provider of mass transportation in Daviess County, Indiana

- Headquarters: 2200 Memorial Avenue
- Locale: Washington, Indiana
- Service area: Daviess County, Indiana
- Service type: Bus service, paratransit
- Routes: 1
- Stops: 23
- Fleet: 1 bus
- Annual ridership: 18,426 (2019)
- Website: Washington Transit System

Washington Transit System (WTS) is the primary provider of mass transportation in Washington, Indiana, with one bus route serving the region. As of 2019, the system provided 18,426 rides over 2,450 annual vehicle revenue hours with 1 bus.

== History ==
Public transit in Washington began with streetcars in 1896, with the Washington Street Railway Co. Streetcar service was replaced with buses in 1935. In 2019, bus stop signage was added through a grant from the Glick Foundation and Purdue Extension.

== Service ==
Washington Transit System operates one weekday deviated fixed-route in a loop around the city. Hours of operation for the system are Monday through Friday from 7:00 A.M. to 4:00 P.M. There is no service on Saturdays and Sundays. The service is fare-free.

== Fixed route ridership ==
The ridership statistics shown here are of fixed route services only and do not include demand response services.

== See also ==
- List of bus transit systems in the United States
- Bloomington Transit
