= John W. Gaddis =

American architect

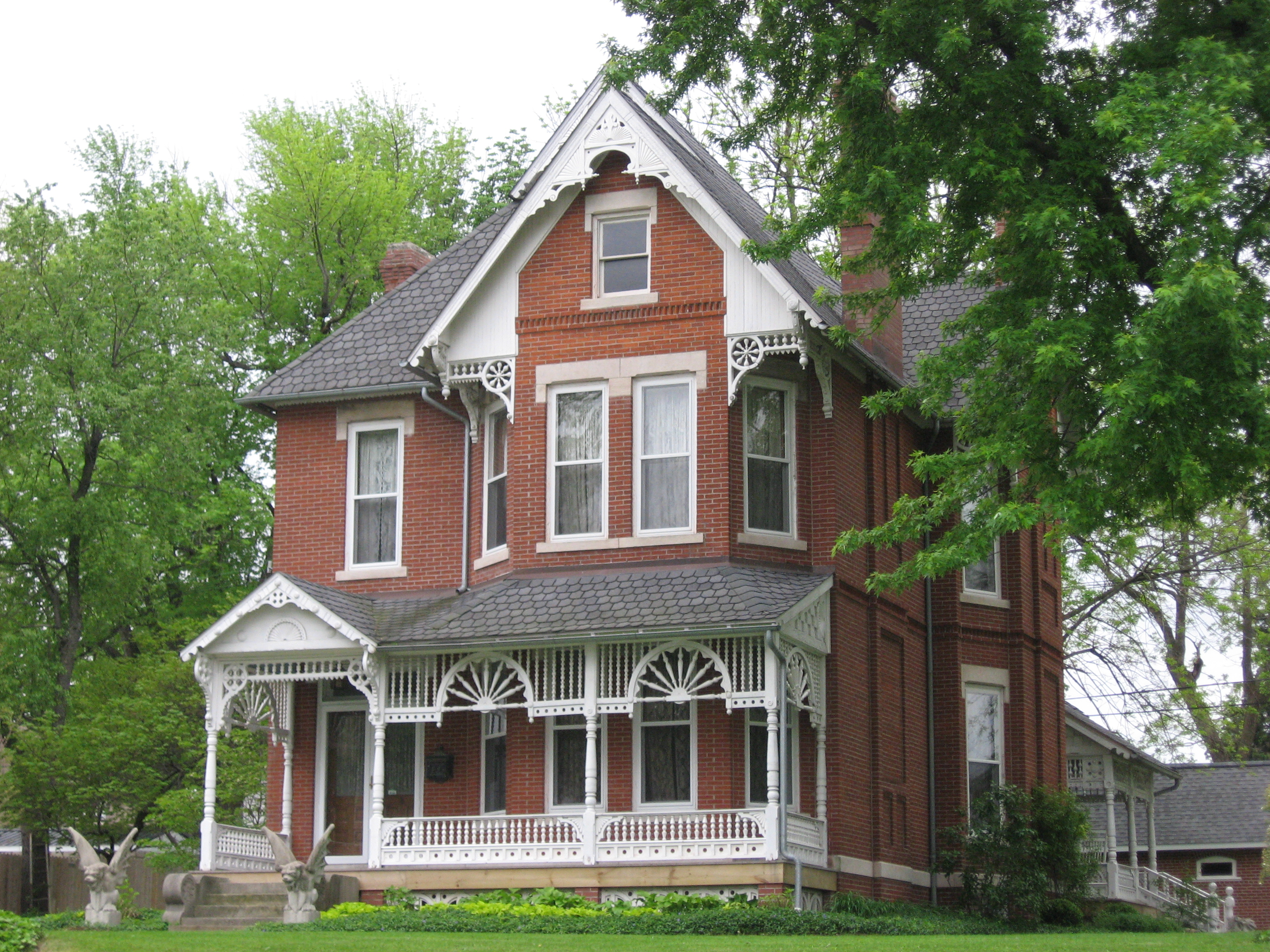
Dr. Nelson Wilson House

John W. Gaddis (December 2, 1858 - September 5, 1931) was a noted architect of Vincennes, Indiana. He designed numerous buildings that are preserved and listed on the National Register of Historic Places (NRHP).

His works include:

- Shriver House, 117 E. 3rd. St., Flora, Illinois, 1893. NRHP-listed in 1983, NRHP reference number 83000306
- Dr. Nelson Wilson House, 103 E National Highway, Washington, Indiana, 1896. NRHP-listed in 2008, NRHP reference number 08000566.
- Vermillion County Jail, 220 E. Market St., Newport, Indiana, 1896. NRHP-listed in 1999, NRHP reference number 99000305
- Natchez Institute, Natchez, Mississippi, 1901
- Columbus Public Library, corner of Fifth and Mechanics streets, Columbus, Indiana, 1903. Demolished in 1969.
- Flora Public Library, Flora, Illinois, 1904. Demolished in 1990.
- Olney Carnegie Library, 401 E. Main St., Olney, Illinois, 1904 NRHP-listed in 2002, NRHP reference number 02000037
- Perry County Courthouse, Perryville, Missouri, 1906. NRHP-listed in 2016, NRHP reference number 16000286
- Saline County Courthouse (demolished), Harrisburg, Illinois, 1906
- Case Library, Baker University, Eighth and Grove, Baldwin City, Kansas, 1906. NRHP-listed in 1986, NRHP reference number 86001232
- Richland County Courthouse, Olney, Illinois, 1914
- Clay County Courthouse, Bounded by US 40, Harrison, Jackson, and Alabama streets, Brazil, Indiana, 1914. NRHP-listed in 1999, NRHP reference number 99001109
- Adult High School (Clarksville, Tennessee), originally called Clarksville High School, Greenwood Ave., Clarksville, Tennessee, 1917. NRHP-listed in 1983, NRHP reference number 83004281
- Vincennes Masonic Temple, 501 Broadway St., Vincennes, Indiana, 1917.
- Shadowwood, also known as the Wharf Estate, 6451 E. Wheatland Rd., Vincennes, Indiana, 1917. NRHP-listed in 2001, NRHP reference number 01000618
- Pineville Courthouse in the Pineville Courthouse Square Historic District, Along Kentucky, Pine, Virginia, and Walnut streets, Pineville, Kentucky, 1919. NRHP-listed in 1990, NRHP reference number 90001019

He died in 1931.
