= Shriver House =

Historic house in Illinois, United States

- U.S. National Register of Historic Places
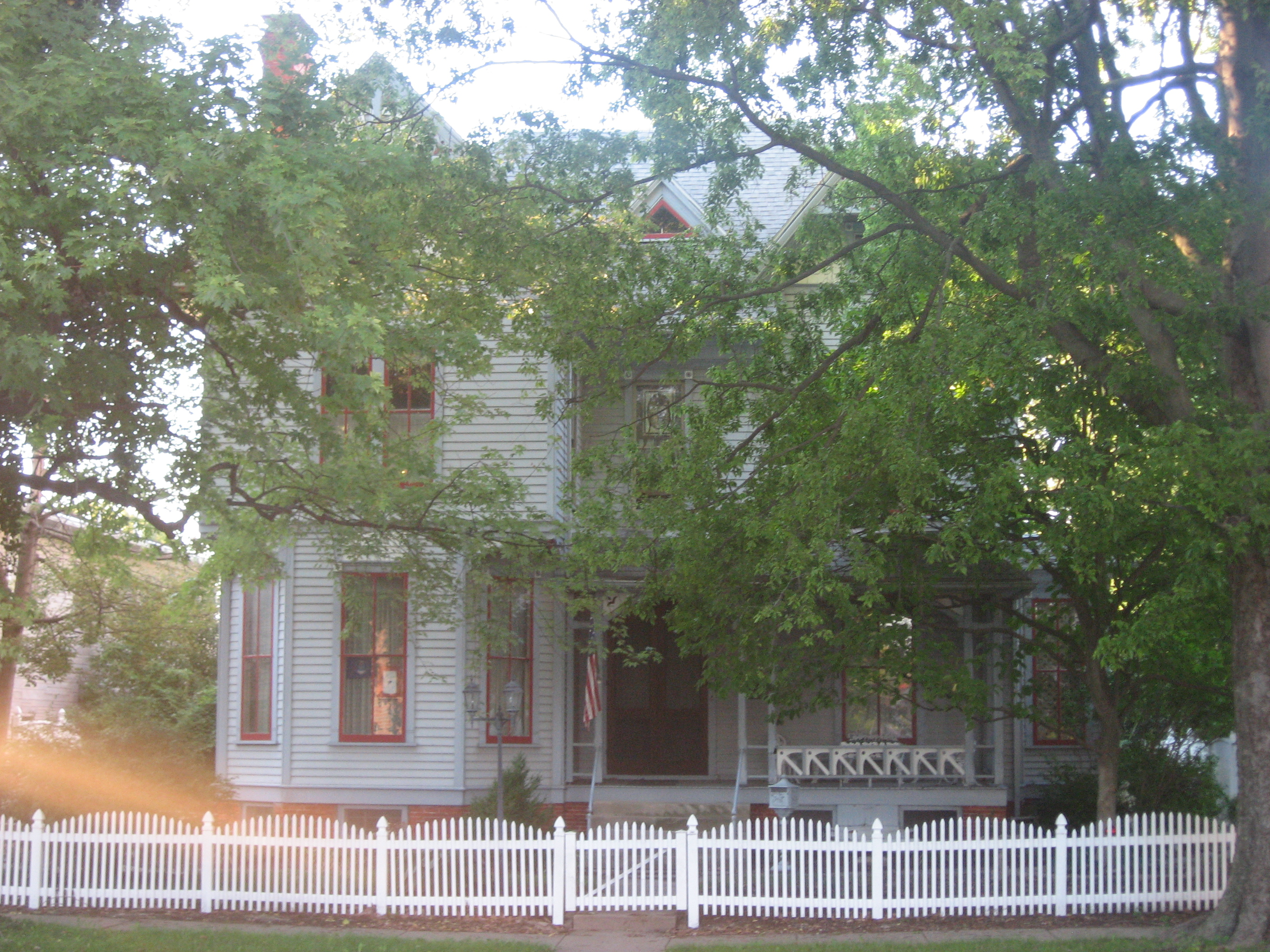

- Location within Illinois Location within the United States
- Location: 117 E. 3rd. St., Flora, Illinois
- Coordinates: 38°40′15″N 88°29′10″W
- Area: less than one acre
- Built: 1893
- Architect: Gaddis, J. W.
- Architectural style: Queen Anne
- NRHP reference No.: 83000306
- Added to NRHP: May 9, 1983

The Shriver House is a historic house located at 117 E. 3rd St. in Flora, Illinois. Built in 1893, the Queen Anne house was designed by architect John W. Gaddis. The house's exterior design features multiple gables on the front facade, original windows with hinged wooden shutters, and a carved wooden front door with etched glass panels. The interior of the house includes a carved wooden staircase with spindle turned posts and three fireplaces with decoratively tiled hearths and carved wooden mantels. The house was used for student housing at Orchard City College, a defunct institution which was the only college to ever operate in Flora.

The house was added to the National Register of Historic Places on May 9, 1983.
