= Dr. John A. Scudder House =

Historic house in Indiana, United States

- U.S. National Register of Historic Places
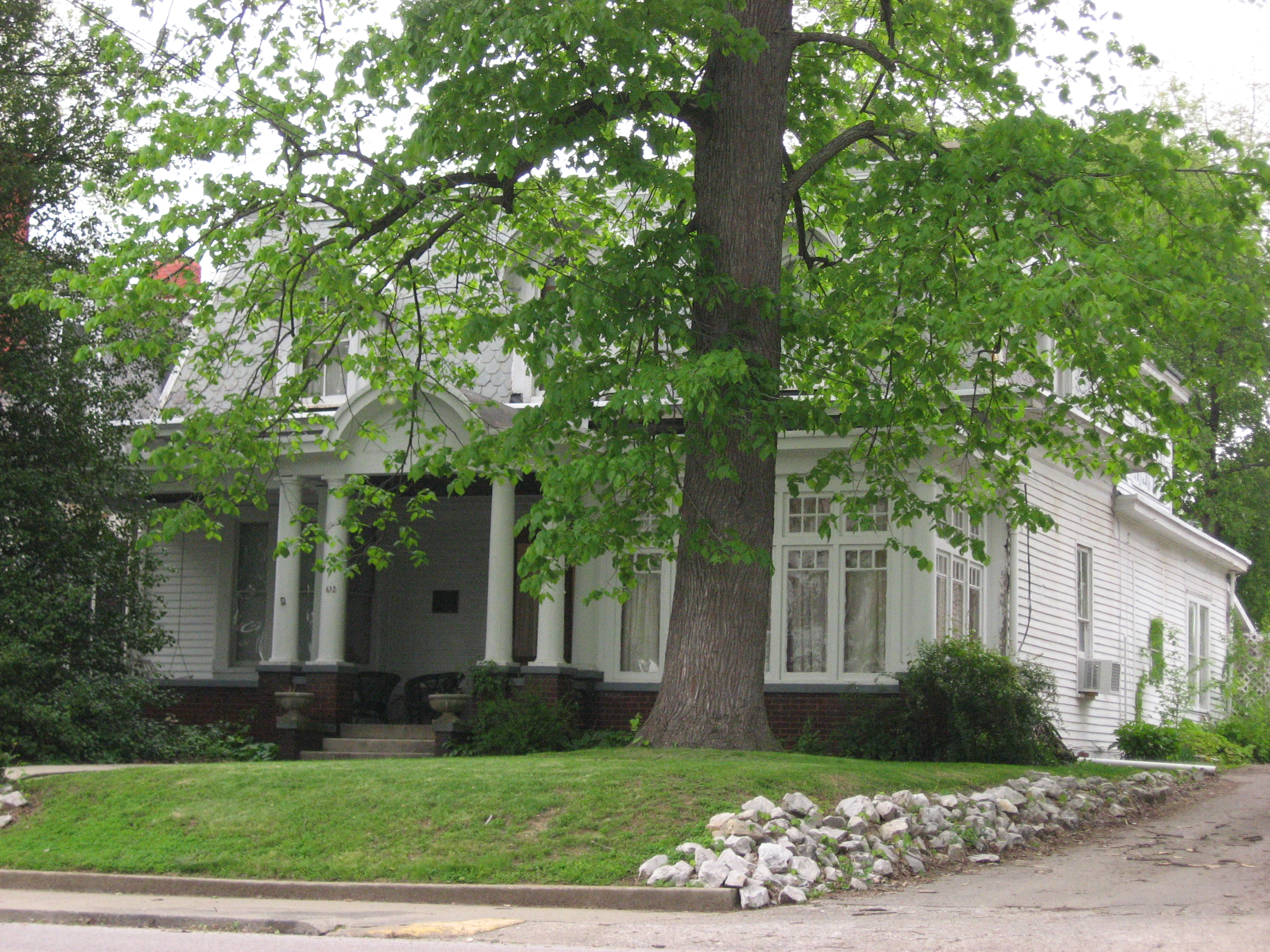
- Dr. John A. Scudder House, April 2011

- Location within Indiana Location within the United States
- Location: 612 E. Main St., Washington, Indiana
- Coordinates: 38°39′26″N 87°10′5″W
- Area: less than one acre
- Built: c. 1861, c. 1922
- Architectural style: Second Empire
- NRHP reference No.: 95001104
- Added to NRHP: September 14, 1995

The Dr. John A. Scudder House is a historic home located at Washington, Indiana. It was built in about 1861, and is a one-story, Second Empire style frame dwelling with a slate mansard roof. It is sheathed in weatherboard and rests on a brick foundation. It was remodelled in about 1922 to add a sunroom and porch. It was added to the National Register of Historic Places in 1995.
