= Magnus J. Carnahan House =

Historic house in Indiana, United States

- U.S. National Register of Historic Places
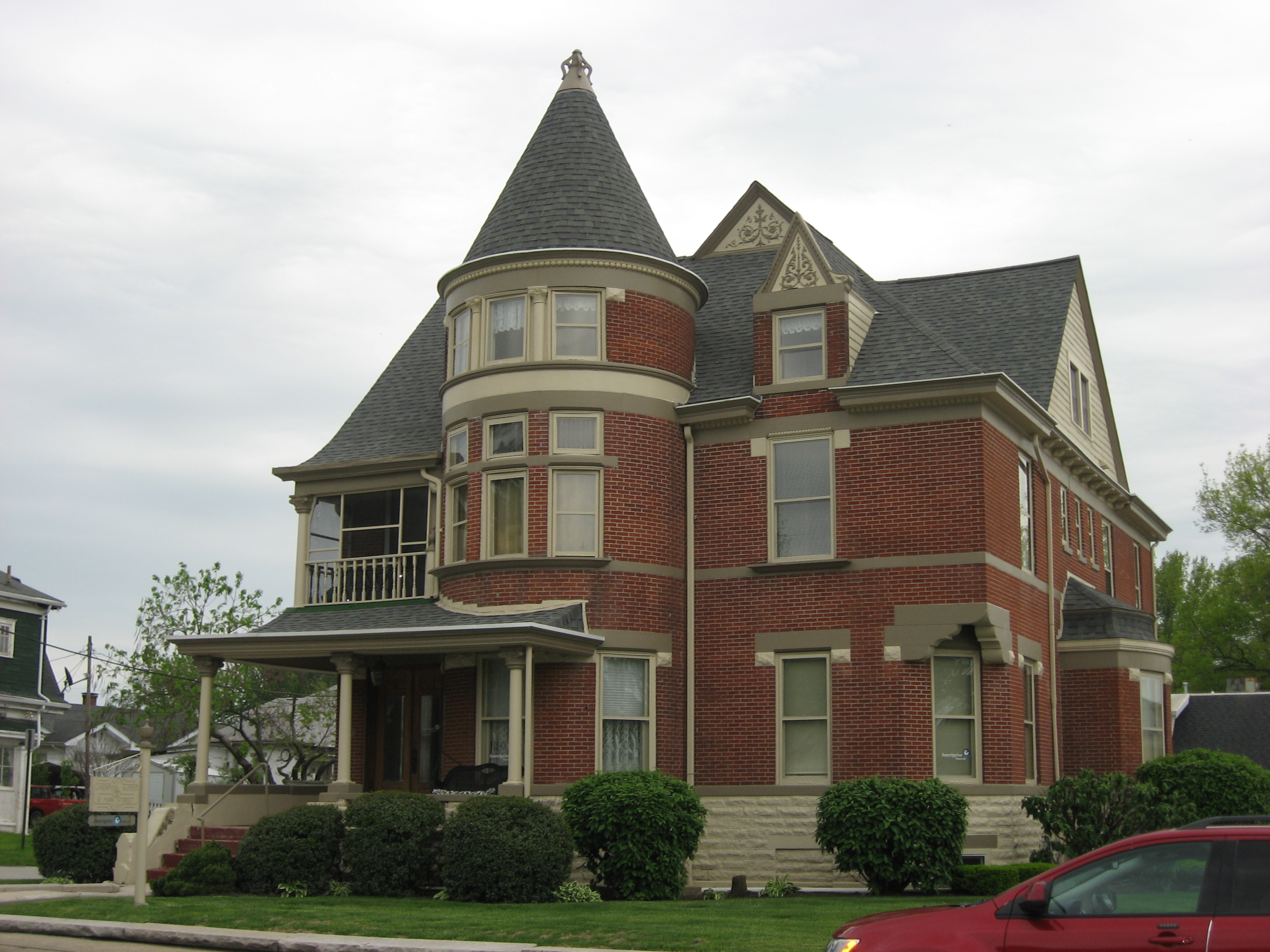
- Magnus J. Carnahan House, April 2011

- Location within Indiana Location within the United States
- Location: 511 E. Main St., Washington, Indiana
- Coordinates: 38°39′23″N 87°10′11″W
- Area: less than one acre
- Built: 1896-1902
- Architectural style: Queen Anne
- NRHP reference No.: 91001167
- Added to NRHP: August 29, 1991

Magnus J. Carnahan House is a historic home located at Washington, Indiana. It was built between 1896 and 1902, and is a 2 1/2-story, Queen Anne style brick dwelling on a raised basement. It features a round corner tower with a conical roof, one-story porch and balcony, and complex hipped and gable roof. Also on the property is a contributing carriage house.

It was added to the National Register of Historic Places in 1991.
