= Lettsville, Indiana =

Unincorporated community in Indiana, U.S.

Coordinates: 38°43′07″N 87°10′28″W

Lettsville is an unincorporated community in Daviess County, Indiana, in the United States.

== History ==
A post office was established at Lettsville in 1869, and remained in operation until it was discontinued in 1887. The founder of Lettsville was Warden C. Lett.
