= County Bridge No. 45 =

- County Bridge #45
- U.S. National Register of Historic Places
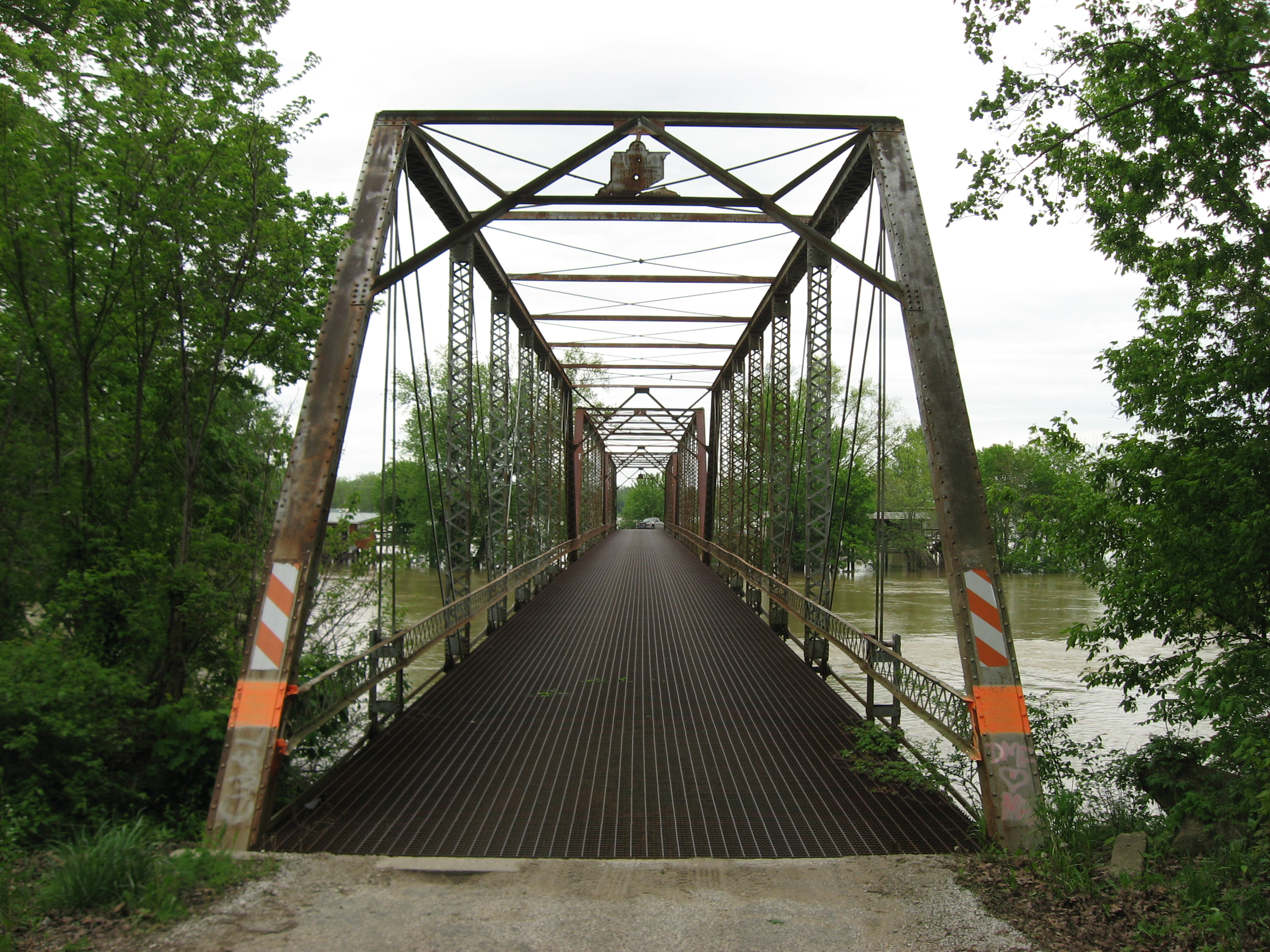
- County Bridge No. 45, April 2011

- Location within Indiana Location within the United States
- Location: Carries County Road 150N over the White River, northeast of Wheatland, Washington Township, Daviess County, Indiana
- Coordinates: 38°40′47″N 87°16′20″W
- Area: less than one acre
- Built: 1903
- Built by: Indiana Bridge Co.
- Architectural style: Pratt Through Truss
- NRHP reference No.: 06000856
- Added to NRHP: September 20, 2006

County Bridge No. 45 is a historic Pratt Through Truss bridge located in Washington Township, Daviess County, Indiana. It was built by the Indiana Bridge Company and erected in 1903. It carries County Road 150N over the White River and into Knox County, Indiana. The bridge consists of three 140 foot long spans on concrete abutments, with an overall length of 422 feet.

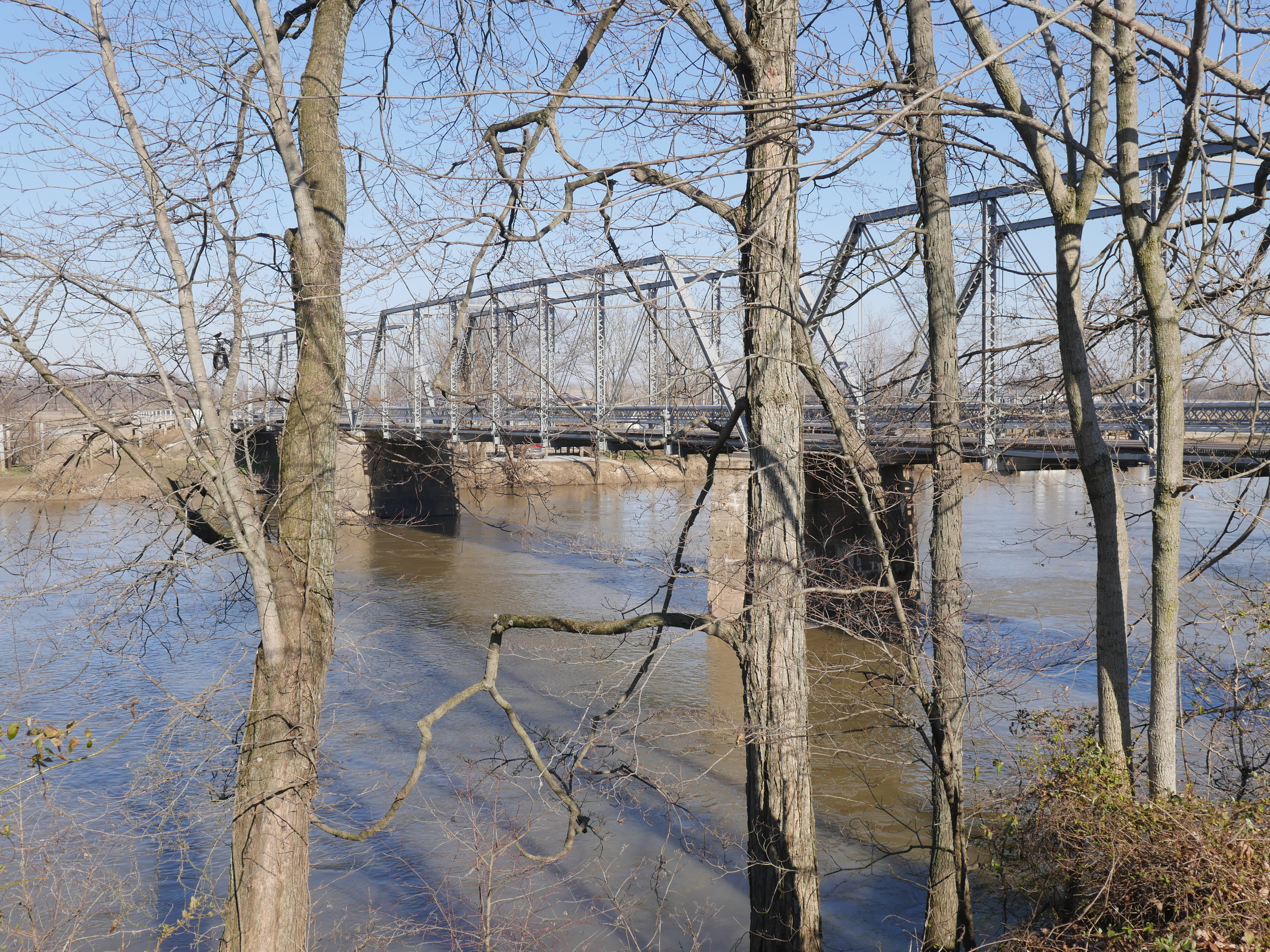
Photo taken of the side of Max G. Ramsey Memorial Bridge in February 2020.

It was added to the National Register of Historic Places in 2006.
