= Thomas Faith House =

Historic house in Indiana, United States

- U.S. National Register of Historic Places
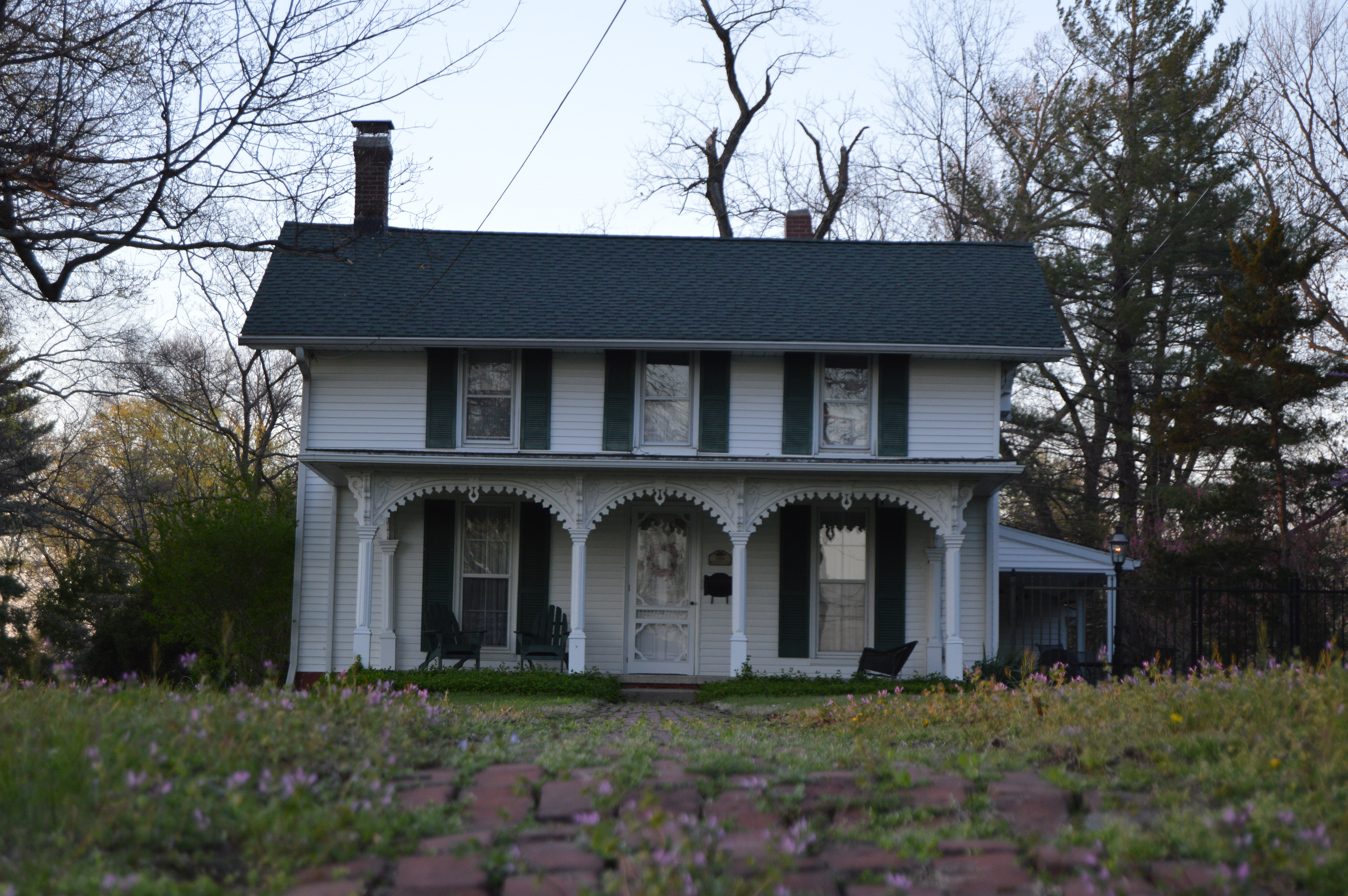
- Front of the house

- Location within Indiana Location within the United States
- Location: 1208 Bedford Rd., Washington, Indiana
- Coordinates: 38°39′38″N 87°9′40″W
- Area: 1.2 acres (0.49 ha)
- Built: 1821
- Built by: Thomas Faith
- Architectural style: I-house
- NRHP reference No.: 94000227
- Added to NRHP: March 28, 1994

Thomas Faith House is a historic home located at Washington, Indiana. It was built in 1821, and is a 1 1/2-story, log, I-house. It has a 1 1/2-story, timber frame rear addition dating to the 19th century and attached two-car garage. It features a one-story front porch with an arched frieze and elaborate scrollwork.

It was added to the National Register of Historic Places in 1994.
