= Jefferson Elementary School (Washington, Indiana) =

- U.S. National Register of Historic Places
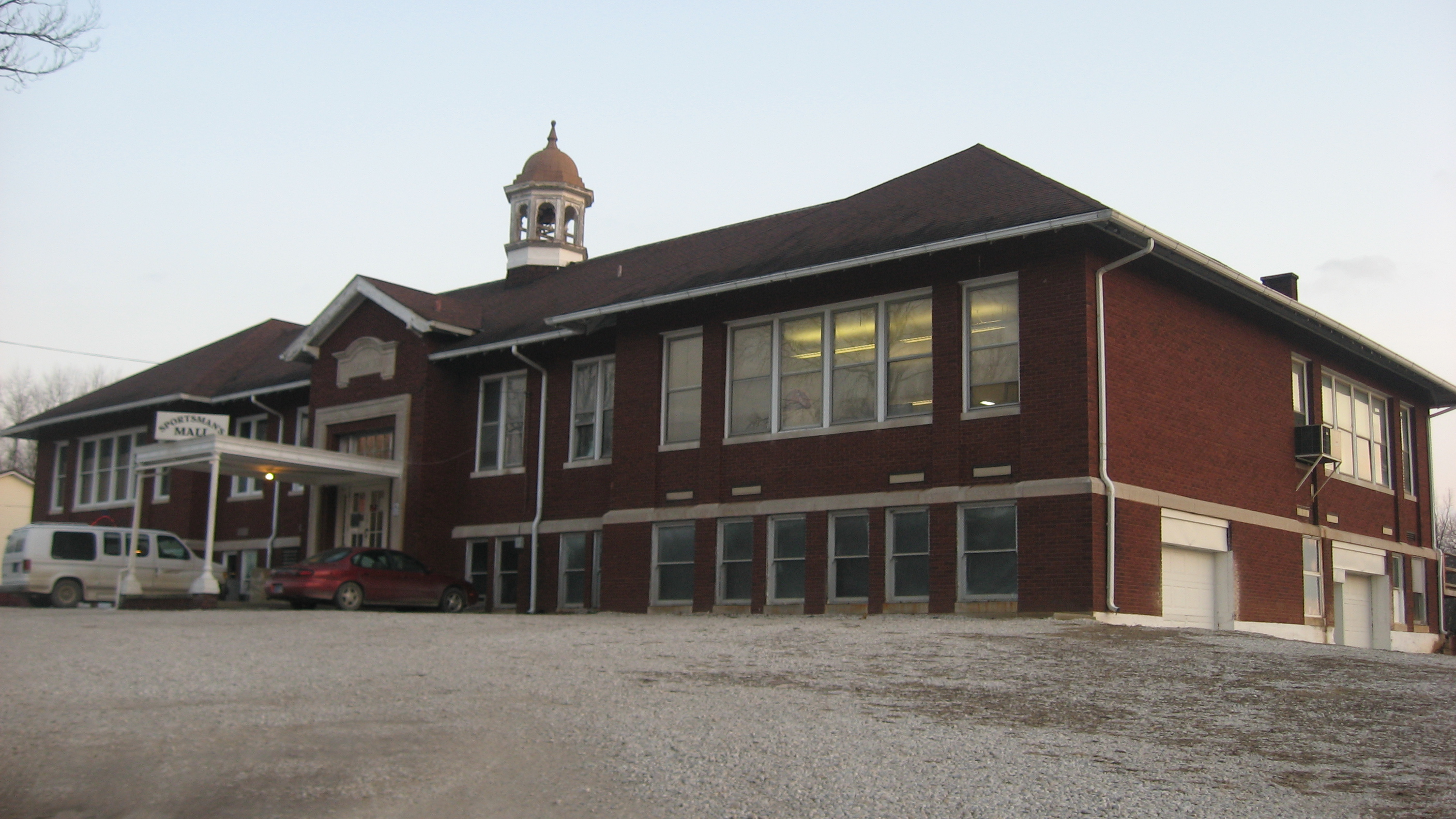
- Jefferson Elementary School, December 2011

- Location within Indiana Location within the United States
- Location: 381 W 150 S, Washington, Indiana
- Coordinates: 38°38′3″N 87°10′22″W
- Area: 2.8 acres (1.1 ha)
- Built: 1924
- Architect: Sutton & Routt; Baird, O.B.
- Architectural style: Colonial Revival, Bungalow/craftsman
- NRHP reference No.: 97000597
- Added to NRHP: June 20, 1997

Jefferson Elementary School is a historic elementary school building located in South Washington, Indiana. It was built in 1924, and is a one-story, I-shaped, red brick building on a high raised basement with Colonial Revival and Bungalow / American Craftsman style design elements. The building has limestone detailing and a hipped roof topped by a cupola. It has a two-story gymnasium wing. The school closed in 1976.

It was added to the National Register of Historic Places in 1997.
