= Dr. Nelson Wilson House =

Historic house in Indiana, United States

- U.S. National Register of Historic Places
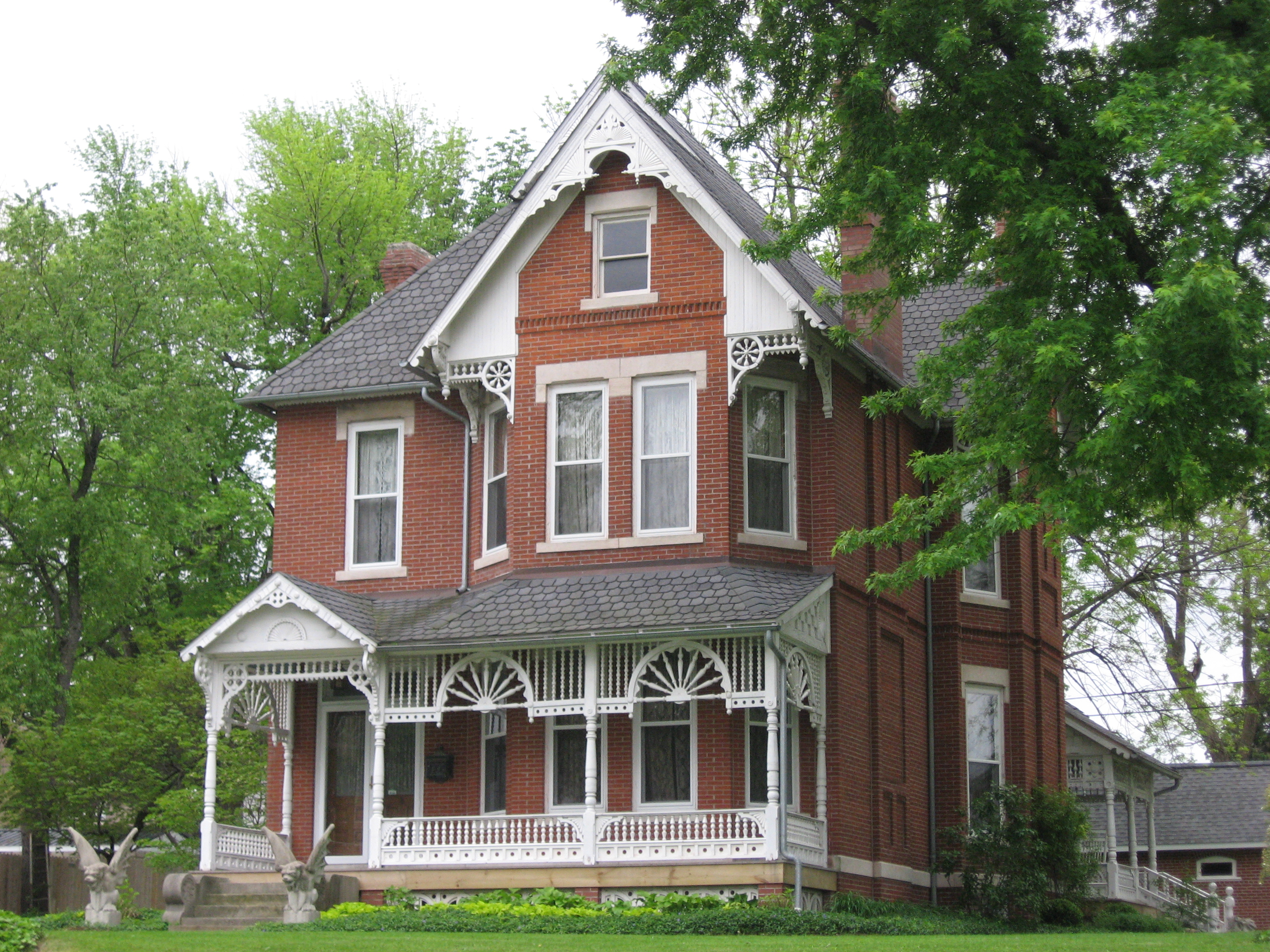
- Front and western side of the house

- Location within Indiana Location within the United States
- Location: 103 E. National Highway, Washington, Indiana
- Coordinates: 38°39′9.39″N 87°10′28.64″W
- Area: less than one acre
- Built: 1896
- Architect: John W. Gaddis
- Architectural style: Queen Anne
- NRHP reference No.: 08000566
- Added to NRHP: June 27, 2008

The Dr. Nelson Wilson House is a place on the National Register of Historic Places in Washington, Indiana. It was placed on the Register on June 26, 2008, due to its unique architecture (a mix of Queen Anne and Eastlake), and for being the work of prominent local architect John W. Gaddis. The Daviess County Interim Report gave the house its highest rating: "Outstanding".

Nelson H. Wilson, born in Jefferson County, Indiana on November 12, 1844, married Matilda M. Campbell in 1889. From 1890 to 1895 he practiced dentistry is Washington, Indiana. In 1893 they had the house built. In 1895, Nelson Wilson died. Sometime between Wilson's death and 1900 the house went to William Beck, whose family would own the house until 2001. Matilda Wilson died on August 11, 1914.

The Dr. Nelson Wilson House is a two-story Queen Anne-style house, with a brick foundation, brick and limestone walls, and asphalt roof, built in 1893 by a John W. Gaddis, an architect from nearby Vincennes, Indiana who would later become known for building courthouses, such as those for Clay County, Huntington County, and Putnam County. Gaddis included elements of the Eastlake style in the house as well, as demonstrated by its "stickwork"; it is highly unusual, however, that the stickwork was not done with wood, as typical in Eastlake, but instead with brick.

Of particular note are the pattern on the side porches, which is Masonic Cross pattern. This Masonic Cross pattern could be seen as a Maltese Cross motif, save that both Nelson Wilson and John Gaddis were active Freemasons, and the thought of deviating from the Eastlake style to the Masonic Cross style in constructing the side porches is easily explained in one of the two deciding on the style.
