= Robert C. Graham House =

Historic house in Indiana, United States

- U.S. National Register of Historic Places
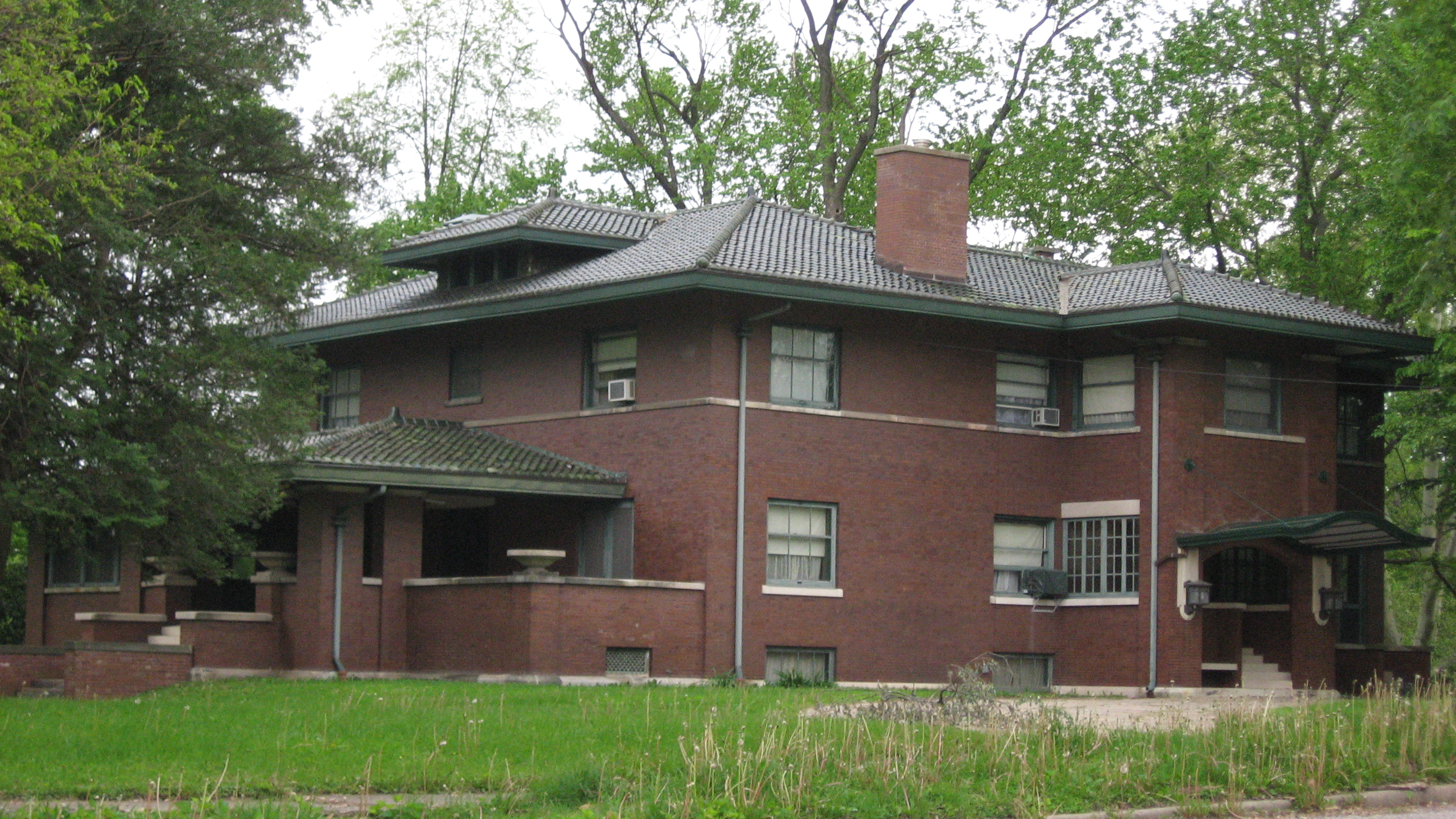
- Robert C. Graham House, April 2011

- Location within Indiana Location within the United States
- Location: 101 W. Maple St., Washington, Indiana
- Coordinates: 38°39′43″N 87°10′42″W
- Area: 5 acres (2.0 ha)
- Built: 1912
- Architect: Keith & Company
- Architectural style: Prairie School
- NRHP reference No.: 83000120
- Added to NRHP: March 16, 1983

Robert C. Graham House, also known as Mimi's House and the Kelly-Graham House, is a historic home located at Washington, Indiana. It was built in 1912, and is a large two-story, Prairie School style glazed red brick dwelling. It has a low pitched hipped roof with wide overhanging eaves and covered with green Spanish tile. Its porches feature mosaic tile floors. From 1918 to 1967, it was the home of automobile manufacturer Robert C. Graham (1885–1967).

It was added to the National Register of Historic Places in 1983.

In 1989, a historical marker was erected 101 W. Maple & NW 1st Streets, Washington.
