= Daviess County Courthouse (Indiana) =

- U.S. National Register of Historic Places
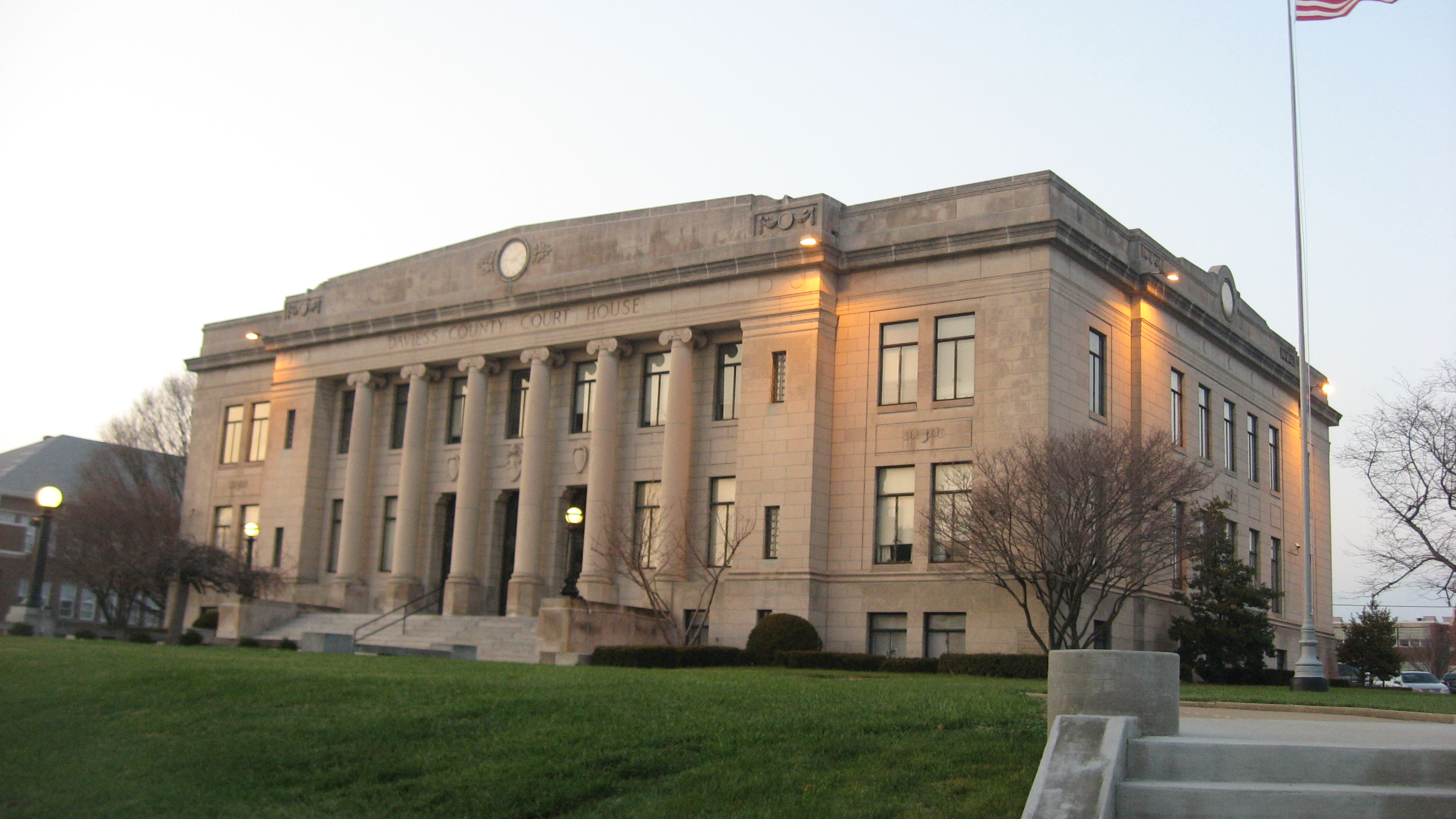
- Daviess County Courthouse, December 2011

- Location within Indiana Location within the United States
- Location: 200 E. Walnut St., Washington, Indiana
- Coordinates: 38°39′32″N 87°10′22″W
- Area: less than one acre
- Built: 1927-1928
- Architect: Sutton, Byron; Routt, Lester W.
- Architectural style: Classical Revival
- NRHP reference No.: 08000916
- Added to NRHP: September 17, 2008

Daviess County Courthouse is a historically significant courthouse situated at Washington, Indiana. Constructed in 1927–1928, it exemplifies the Classical Revival style. This two-story rectangular structure is constructed primarily of brick and adorned with Bedford limestone. Measuring approximately 80 feet by 124 feet, it features a flat roof and slightly protruding colonnaded pavilions. One of these pavilions boasts six freestanding Ionic order columns. Unfortunately, the original second floor courtroom was damaged by fire in 1985.

Also on the property are the contributing Union Soldier monument on the southwest corner of the lawn (1900) and flagpole (1929).

It was added to the National Register of Historic Places in 2008.
