= Washington, Indiana =

City in Daviess County, Indiana

- City
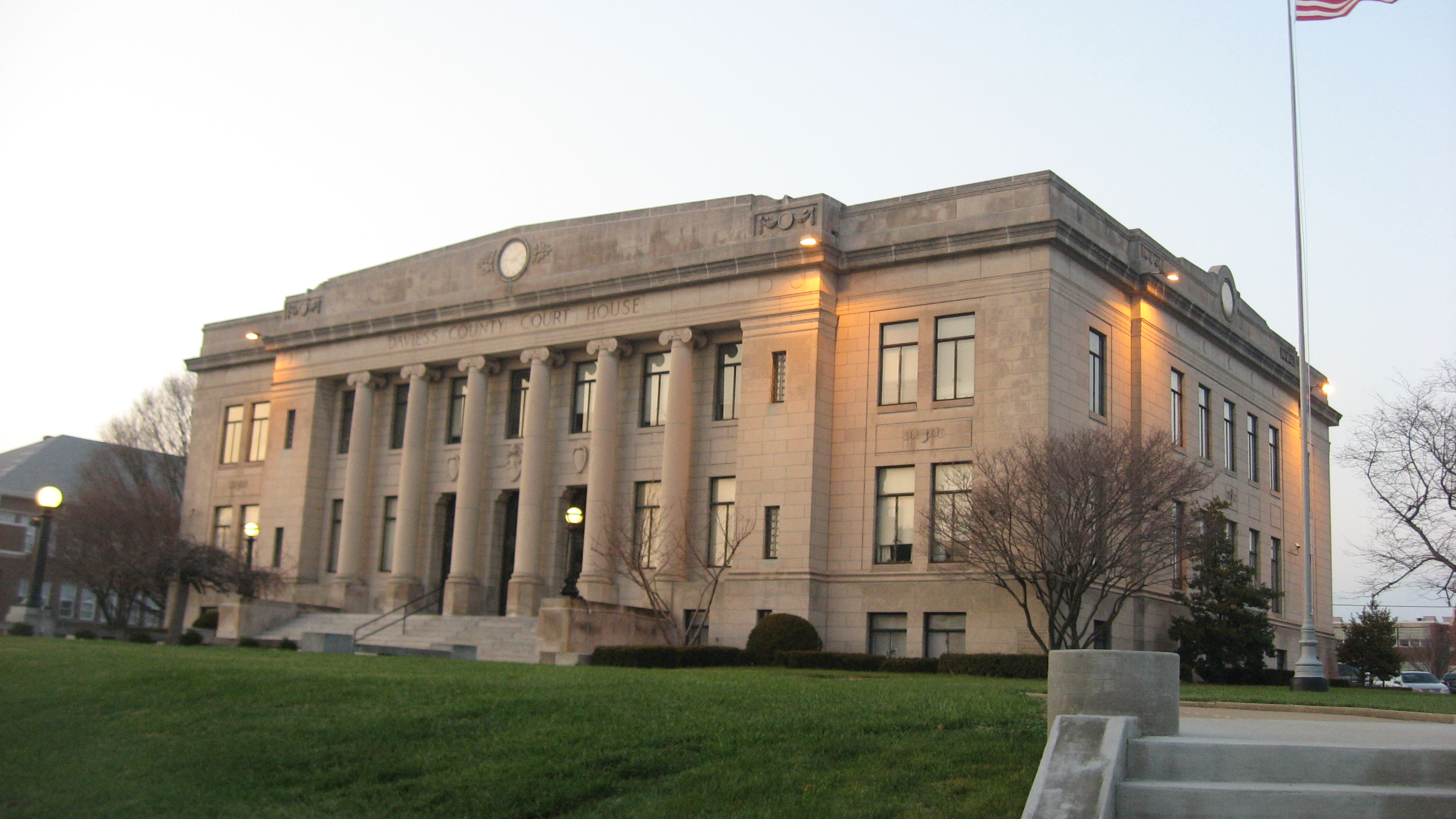
- Daviess County courthouse in Washington

- Seal
- Motto: "A City of Pride and Progress"
- Location of Washington in Daviess County, Indiana.
- Coordinates: 38°39′31″N 87°09′33″W
- Country: United States
- State: Indiana
- County: Daviess
- Township: Washington
- Established: 1817

Government
  - Mayor: Dave Rhoads (D)

Area
  - Total: 6.67 sq mi (17.27 km^{2})
  - Land: 6.63 sq mi (17.17 km^{2})
  - Water: 0.042 sq mi (0.11 km^{2}) 0.84%
- Elevation: 532 ft (162 m)

Population (2020)
  - Total: 12,017
  - Density: 1,890.1/sq mi (729.79/km^{2})
- Time zone: UTC-5 (EST)
  - Summer (DST): UTC-4 (EDT)
- ZIP code: 47501
- Area codes: 812, 930
- FIPS code: 18-80504
- GNIS feature ID: 2397205
- Website: www.washingtonin.us

Washington is a city in Daviess County, Indiana, United States. The population was 12,017 at the time of the 2020 census. The city is the county seat of Daviess County. It is also the principal city of the Washington, Indiana Micropolitan Statistical Area, which comprises all of Daviess County and had an estimated 2017 population of 31,648.

== History ==
Washington was platted in 1815. It was named from Washington Township.

The railroad was built through Washington in 1857. By 1889, it was a major depot and repair yard for the Ohio and Mississippi Railroad. The Baltimore and Ohio Railroad took over the line in 1893. During this time, the railroad employed over 1,000 workers.

On November 17, 2013, an EF2 tornado tore through the western edge of the city destroying 20 homes and severely damaging 20 others.

The Magnus J. Carnahan House, Daviess County Courthouse, Thomas Faith House, Robert C. Graham House, Dr. John A. Scudder House, Washington Commercial Historic District, and Dr. Nelson Wilson House are listed on the National Register of Historic Places.

== Geography ==
According to the 2010 census, Washington has a total area of 4.767 square miles (12.35 km^{2}), of which 4.73 square miles (12.25 km^{2}) (or 99.22%) is land and 0.037 square miles (0.10 km^{2}) (or 0.78%) is water.

=== Climate ===
Washington has a humid subtropical climate (Köppen classification Cfa), with four distinct seasons. Winters are cool to chilly with moderate snowfall, while summers are warm and humid.

Climate data for Washington (1 mile W), Indiana (1991-2020 normals, extremes 1896–present)
Month	Jan	Feb	Mar	Apr	May	Jun	Jul	Aug	Sep	Oct	Nov	Dec	Year
Record high °F (°C)	76 (24)	77 (25)	89 (32)	93 (34)	100 (38)	107 (42)	113 (45)	108 (42)	106 (41)	96 (36)	84 (29)	75 (24)	113 (45)
Mean daily maximum °F (°C)	40.4 (4.7)	45.6 (7.6)	56.5 (13.6)	68.5 (20.3)	77.4 (25.2)	85.0 (29.4)	87.4 (30.8)	86.3 (30.2)	81.1 (27.3)	69.9 (21.1)	55.6 (13.1)	44.7 (7.1)	66.5 (19.2)
Daily mean °F (°C)	32.1 (0.1)	36.6 (2.6)	46.2 (7.9)	56.9 (13.8)	66.7 (19.3)	74.4 (23.6)	77.1 (25.1)	75.7 (24.3)	69.3 (20.7)	58.4 (14.7)	46.0 (7.8)	36.5 (2.5)	56.3 (13.5)
Mean daily minimum °F (°C)	23.9 (−4.5)	27.5 (−2.5)	35.8 (2.1)	45.4 (7.4)	56.0 (13.3)	63.9 (17.7)	66.8 (19.3)	65.1 (18.4)	57.6 (14.2)	46.9 (8.3)	36.4 (2.4)	28.4 (−2.0)	46.1 (7.8)
Record low °F (°C)	−18 (−28)	−19 (−28)	−4 (−20)	19 (−7)	28 (−2)	38 (3)	47 (8)	42 (6)	29 (−2)	18 (−8)	−2 (−19)	−19 (−28)	−19 (−28)
Average rainfall inches (mm)	3.59 (91)	2.88 (73)	4.02 (102)	4.83 (123)	5.51 (140)	5.15 (131)	4.14 (105)	3.17 (81)	3.50 (89)	3.60 (91)	3.91 (99)	3.68 (93)	47.98 (1,218)
Average snowfall inches (cm)	2.9 (7.4)	2.0 (5.1)	1.0 (2.5)	0 (0)	0 (0)	0 (0)	0 (0)	0 (0)	0 (0)	0.1 (0.25)	0.1 (0.25)	3.1 (7.9)	9.2 (23.4)
Source: NOAA

== Demographics ==
Historical population
Census	Pop.	Note	%±
1850	675		—
1870	2,901		—
1880	4,323		49.0%
1890	6,064		40.3%
1900	8,551		41.0%
1910	7,854		−8.2%
1920	8,743		11.3%
1930	9,070		3.7%
1940	9,312		2.7%
1950	10,987		18.0%
1960	10,846		−1.3%
1970	11,358		4.7%
1980	11,325		−0.3%
1990	10,838		−4.3%
2000	11,380		5.0%
2010	11,509		1.1%
2020	12,017		4.4%
U.S. Decennial Census

=== 2020 census ===
As of the 2020 census, Washington had a population of 12,017. The median age was 36.8 years. 25.5% of residents were under the age of 18 and 17.4% of residents were 65 years of age or older. For every 100 females there were 96.6 males, and for every 100 females age 18 and over there were 94.7 males age 18 and over.

99.4% of residents lived in urban areas, while 0.6% lived in rural areas.

There were 4,694 households in Washington, of which 31.4% had children under the age of 18 living in them. Of all households, 39.1% were married-couple households, 21.3% were households with a male householder and no spouse or partner present, and 31.7% were households with a female householder and no spouse or partner present. About 33.0% of all households were made up of individuals and 15.3% had someone living alone who was 65 years of age or older.

There were 5,175 housing units, of which 9.3% were vacant. The homeowner vacancy rate was 1.8% and the rental vacancy rate was 7.6%.

Racial composition as of the 2020 census
Race	Number	Percent
White	9,644	80.3%
Black or African American	570	4.7%
American Indian and Alaska Native	44	0.4%
Asian	83	0.7%
Native Hawaiian and Other Pacific Islander	4	0.0%
Some other race	690	5.7%
Two or more races	982	8.2%
Hispanic or Latino (of any race)	1,770	14.7%

=== 2010 census ===
As of the census of 2010, there were 11,509 people, 4,558 households, and 2,849 families living in the city. The population density was 2,433.2 inhabitants per square mile (939.5/km^{2}). There were 5,067 housing units at an average density of 1,071.2 per square mile (413.6/km^{2}). The racial makeup of the city was 89.2% White, 1.1% African American, 0.3% Native American, 1.1% Asian, 0.1% Pacific Islander, 6.4% from other races, and 1.9% from two or more races. Hispanic or Latino of any race were 9.6% of the population.

There were 4,558 households, of which 33.4% had children under the age of 18 living with them, 41.8% were married couples living together, 15.2% had a female householder with no husband present, 5.5% had a male householder with no wife present, and 37.5% were non-families. 31.8% of all households were made up of individuals, and 14.9% had someone living alone who was 65 years of age or older. The average household size was 2.43 and the average family size was 3.04.

The median age in the city was 37.3 years. 25.5% of residents were under the age of 18; 9.4% were between the ages of 18 and 24; 24% were from 25 to 44; 25.2% were from 45 to 64; and 15.9% were 65 years of age or older. The gender makeup of the city was 48.2% male and 51.8% female.

=== 2000 census ===
As of the census of 2000, there were 11,380 people, 4,658 households, and 2,897 families living in the city. The population density was 2,404.0 inhabitants per square mile (928.2/km^{2}). There were 5,077 housing units at an average density of 1,072.5 per square mile (414.1/km^{2}). The racial makeup of the city was 95.30% White, 0.91% African American, 0.30% Native American, 0.39% Asian, 0.05% Pacific Islander, 2.20% from other races, and 0.85% from two or more races. Hispanic or Latino of any race were 4.15% of the population.

There were 4,658 households, out of which 30.6% had children under the age of 18 living with them, 45.9% were married couples living together, 12.5% had a female householder with no husband present, and 37.8% were non-families. 33.2% of all households were made up of individuals, and 16.1% had someone living alone who was 65 years of age or older. The average household size was 2.36 and the average family size was 2.99.

In the city, the population was spread out, with 25.5% under the age of 18, 8.3% from 18 to 24, 26.1% from 25 to 44, 21.7% from 45 to 64, and 18.3% who were 65 years of age or older. The median age was 38 years. For every 100 females, there were 89.7 males. For every 100 females age 18 and over, there were 84.7 males.

The median income for a household in the city was $29,055, and the median income for a family was $37,713. Males had a median income of $30,570 versus $19,306 for females. The per capita income for the city was $16,721. About 9.8% of families and 14.3% of the population were below the poverty line, including 19.3% of those under age 18 and 10.4% of those age 65 or over.

== Transportation ==
=== Transit ===
Washington Transit System operates bus service in the city on weekdays.

=== Highways ===
- I-69 - Interstate 69 bypasses the city to the east.
- US 50 / US 150 - US 50 and US 150 Bypass the city to the south.
- SR 57 - SR 57 runs through downtown and runs north to Plainville, and south to Petersburg
- SR 257 - SR 257 begins southeast of the city at the US 50/150 Bypass, and runs south to Otwell

== Education ==
The town has a free lending library, the Washington Carnegie Public Library.

Washington Community Schools include:

- Washington High School
- Washington Junior High School
- Helen Griffith Elementary
- Lena Dunn Elementary
- North Elementary School
- Veale Elementary School

== Arts and culture ==
Washington still retains a number of architecturally historical buildings. The Helphenstine House, built in 1847, displays Greek Revival architecture styles. The Robert C. Graham House was owned by an Indiana car manufacturer and was built in 1912. It is an example of Frank Lloyd Wright's Prairie School of Architecture and is listed on the National Register of Historic Places. It has marble fireplaces, crystal-glass French windows, a billiards room and parquet floors. On Main Street of Washington is the Daviess County Historical Society Museum, a collection of history related to Daviess County and Indiana. The museum features a funeral practices exhibit, a military history room, an art gallery, a Civil War display with an 1855 slave collar and a Civil War era regimental flag, a school room, and an archives room for genealogists as well as a gift shop.

The Washington Browns was a minor league baseball team in Washington that played in the Class C Central League in 1897 and were immediately preceded by the Washington Giants, who were members of the Independent level 1896 Kentucky-Indiana League.

== Notable people ==
- Eric Bassler, member of the Indiana Senate
- Charles "Bud" Dant, musician
- David "Big Dave" DeJernett, basketball player
- Don C. Faith, Jr., United States Army officer
- Esther G. Frame (1840–1920), Quaker minister and evangelist
- Chuck Harmon, baseball player
- Anthony R. Jones, United States Army lieutenant general
- Leo Klier, basketball player
- Patrick Summers, conductor
- Ruth Sherman Tolman, clinical psychologist with the Office of Strategic Services
- Charles Thorn, string theorist
- Cody Zeller, basketball player
- Luke Zeller, basketball player
- Tyler Zeller, basketball player
